= Marigold Spring Victory Series 2025 =

2025 Dream Star Fighting Marigold event

- Promotional poster for the event series featuring various wrestlers
- Promotion: Dream Star Fighting Marigold
- Date: March 30, 2025
- City: Tokyo, Japan
- Venue: Korakuen Hall
- Attendance: 911

Event chronology
← Previous; New Year's Golden Garden	Next → Shine Forever

Marigold Spring Victory Series 2025 was a multiple-night professional wrestling event promoted by Dream Star Fighting Marigold. The pay-per-view night of the event took take place on March 30, 2025, in Tokyo, Japan at the Korakuen Hall. The events air globally on CyberFight's video-on-demand service Wrestle Universe.

== Production ==
=== Background ===
The show featured professional wrestling matches that result from scripted storylines, where wrestlers portrayed villains, heroes, or less distinguishable characters in the scripted events that built tension and culminated in a wrestling match or series of matches.

=== Event ===
The event started with the tag team confrontation between Ryoko Skimura and Nagisa Tachibana, and Hummingbird and Riara, solded with the victory of the latters. Next up, Rea Seto and Minami Yuuki picked up a victory over Victoria Yuzuki and Kizuna Tanaka in tag team competition. After the bout concluded, Seto stepped up to challenge Yuzuki for the latter's Marigold Super Fly Championship. In the third bout, Chiaki and Misa Matsui outmatched Natsumi Showzuki and Chika Goto in tag team competition. Next up, Mirai, Miku Aono and Chanyota defeated Nagisa Nozaki, Megaton and Gigaton in six-woman tag team competition. The fifth bout of the event saw Mai Sakurai defeat Erina Yamanaka to secure the third consecutive defense of the Marigold United National Championship in that respective reign. In the semi main event, Nanae Takahashi and Seri Yamaoka defeated Takumi Iroha and Senka Akatsuki to secure the second consecutive defense of the Marigold Twin Star Championship in that respective reign.

In the main event, Utami Hayashishita defeated Bozilla to secure the second consecutive defense of the Marigold World Championship in that respective reign. After the bout concluded, Mirai stepped up as Hayashishita's next challenger.

== Results ==
No.	Results	Stipulations	Times
1	Hummingbird and Riara defeated Ryoko Sakimura and Nagisa Tachibana	Tag team match	5:39
2	Rea Seto and Minami Yuuki defeated Selene Flora (Victoria Yuzuki and Kizuna Tanaka)	Tag team match	9:31
3	Darkness Revolution (Chiaki and Misa Matsui) defeated Natsumi Showzuki and Chika Goto	Tag team match	10:24
4	Mirai, Miku Aono and Chanyota defeated Darkness Revolution (Nagisa Nozaki and Megaton) and Gigaton	Six-woman tag team match	13:37
5	Mai Sakurai (c) defeated Erina Yamanaka	Singles match for the Marigold United National Championship	11:55
6	Nanae Takahashi and Seri Yamaoka (c) defeated Takumi Iroha and Senka Akatsuki	Tag team match for the Marigold Twin Star Championship	25:37
7	Utami Hayashishita (c) defeated Bozilla	Singles match for the Marigold World Championship	19:06
(c) / – the champion(s) heading into the match
