= Marigold Shine Forever 2026 =

2026 Dream Star Fighting Marigold event

- Promotional poster for the event
- Promotion: Dream Star Fighting Marigold
- Date: May 23, 2026
- City: Tokyo, Japan
- Venue: Ota City General Gymnasium
- Attendance: 1,230

Event chronology
| ← Previous; New Year's Golden Garden 2026 | Next → Summer Destiny 2026 |

Shine Forever chronology
| ← Previous; 2025 | Next → — |

Marigold Shine Forever 2026 was a professional wrestling event promoted by Dream Star Fighting Marigold. It took place on May 23, 2026, in Tokyo, Japan at the Ota City General Gymnasium. The event aired globally on CyberFight's video-on-demand service Wrestle Universe.

== Production ==
=== Background ===
The show featured professional wrestling matches that result from scripted storylines, where wrestlers portrayed villains, heroes, or less distinguishable characters in the scripted events that built tension and culminated in a wrestling match or series of matches.

=== Event ===
The event started with the singles confrontation between Lady AI and Hummingbird, solded with the victory of the latter. Next up, Komomo Minami and Nagisa Tachibana wrestled Shinno and Yuuka Yamazaki into a time-limit draw as a result of a tag team bout. In the third match, Chi Chi picked up a victory over Rea Seto in singles competition. The fourth bout saw Nagisa Nozaki, Nightshade, Nyla Rose and Johnnie Robbie outmatch Natsumi Showzuki, Nao Ishikawa, Shoko Koshino and Angel Hayze in eight-woman tag team competition. Next up, Dump Matsumoto picked up a victory over Megaton in singles competition. The sixth bout saw Seri Yamaoka defeat Senka Akatsuki in another singles competition match. In the semi main event, Kouki Amarei and Chika Goto defeated Chiaki and Misa Matsui to win the Marigold Twin Star Championship, ending the latter team's reign at 209 days and six defenses.

In the main event, Miku Aono, Mai Sakurai and Mirai picked up a victory over Utami Hayashishita, Takumi Iroha and Maddy Morgan in six-woman tag team competition. This was Hayashishita's last match as a member of the Dream Star Fighting Marigold promotion.

== Results ==
| No. | Results | Stipulations | Times |
|---|---|---|---|
| 1 | Hummingbird defeated Lady AI by pinfall | Singles match | 6:27 |
| 2 | Komomo Minami and Nagisa Tachibana vs. Shinno and Yuuka Yamazaki ended in a time-limit draw | Tag team match | 10:00 |
| 3 | Chi Chi defeated Rea Seto by pinfall | Singles match | 10:28 |
| 4 | Nagisa Nozaki, Nightshade, Nyla Rose and Johnnie Robbie defeated Natsumi Showzuki, Nao Ishikawa, Shoko Koshino and Angel Hayze by pinfall | Eight-woman tag team match | 10:35 |
| 5 | Dump Matsumoto defeated Megaton by pinfall | Singles match | 5:01 |
| 6 | Seri Yamaoka defeated Senka Akatsuki by pinfall | Singles match | 13:07 |
| 7 | tWin toWer (Kouki Amarei and Chika Goto) defeated Darkness Revolution (Chiaki and Misa Matsui) (c) by pinfall | Tag team match for the Marigold Twin Star Championship | 16:10 |
| 8 | Miku Aono, Mai Sakurai and Mirai defeated Utami Hayashishita, Takumi Iroha and Maddy Morgan by pinfall | Six-woman tag team match | 25:18 |
(c) / – the champion(s) heading into the match
