= Marigold New Year's Golden Garden 2025 =

2025 Dream Star Fighting Marigold event

Marigold New Year's Golden Garden 2025 (Night 1)
- Promotional poster for the event featuring various wrestlers
- Promotion: Dream Star Fighting Marigold
- Date: January 13, 2025
- City: Nagoya, Japan
- Venue: Nagoya Chunichi Hall
- Attendance: 307

Event chronology
| ← Previous; First Dream | Next → Marigold Spring Victory Series |

New Year's Golden Garden chronology
| ← Previous; First | Next → 2026 |

Marigold New Year's Golden Garden 2025 was a multiple-night professional wrestling event promoted by Dream Star Fighting Marigold. The pay-per-view nights of the event took place on January 13, 2025, at the Nagoya Chunichi Hall and on January 19 and February 20, 2025, at the Korakuen Hall. The events aired globally on CyberFight's video-on-demand service Wrestle Universe.

== Production ==
=== Background ===
The show featured professional wrestling matches that result from scripted storylines, where wrestlers portrayed villains, heroes, or less distinguishable characters in the scripted events that built tension and culminated in a wrestling match or series of matches.

== Night 1 ==
=== Event ===
The first pay-per-view night of the event was taped on January 13, 2025 and was broadcast four days later on January 17. It started with the three-way confrontation between Ryoko Sakimura, Natsumi Showzuki and Misa Matsui solded with the victory of the latter. Next up, Bozilla and Megaton picked up a win over Nao Ishikawa and Yuuki Minami in tag team competition. The third bout saw Nagisa Nozaki and Chiaki defeating Mai Sakurai and Rea Seto in tag team competition. In the fourth match, Mirai, Victoria Yuzuki and Seri Yamaoka defeated Miku Aono, Chika Goto and Naho Yamada in six-woman tag team competition.

In the main event, Utami Hayashishita defeated Tank to secure the first successful defense of the Marigold World Championship in that respective reign. After the bout concluded, Megaton challenged Hayashishita at a singles non-title bout on the second night of the event from January 19, 2025.

=== Results ===
| No. | Results | Stipulations | Times |
|---|---|---|---|
| 1 | Misa Matsui defeated Natsumi Showzuki and Ryoko Sakimura | Three-way match | 8:04 |
| 2 | Bozilla and Megaton defeated Nao Ishikawa and Yuuki Minami | Tag team match | 6:53 |
| 3 | Dark Wolf Army (Nagisa Nozaki and Chiaki) defeated Mai Sakurai and Rea Seto | Tag team match | 13:47 |
| 4 | Mirai, Victoria Yuzuki and Seri Yamaoka defeated Miku Aono, Chika Goto and Naho Yamada | Six-woman tag team match | 18:21 |
| 5 | Utami Hayashishita (c) defeated Tank | Singles match for the Marigold World Championship | 10:27 |
(c) / – the champion(s) heading into the match

== Night 2 ==
Marigold New Year's Golden Garden 2025 (Night 2)
- Promotion: Dream Star Fighting Marigold
- Date: January 19, 2025
- City: Tokyo, Japan
- Venue: Korakuen Hall
- Attendance: 785

=== Event ===
The event started with the singles confrontation between Ryoko Sakimura and Chiaki solded with the victory of the latter. Next up, Chika Goto picked up a victory over Yuuki Minami in another singles bout. The third match saw Nao Ishikawa and Rea Seto defeat Naho Yamada and Riara in tag team competition. Next up, Mirai and Misa Matsui outmatched Miku Aono and Natsumi Showzuki in tag team competition. The fifth bout saw Utami Hayashishita defeat Megaton in singles action. Next up, Victoria Yuzuki defeated Yuki Mashiro to secure the first successful defense of the Marigold Super Fly Championship in that respective reign. After the bout concluded, Misa Matsui stepped in as the next challenger. In the semi main event, Mai Sakurai defeated Nagisa Nozaki to secure the first defense of the Marigold United National Championship in that respective reign.

In the main event, Nanae Takahashi and Seri Yamaoka defeated Bozilla and Tank to win the Marigold Twin Star Championship, ending the latter team's reign at 16 days and no defenses.

=== Results ===
| No. | Results | Stipulations | Times |
|---|---|---|---|
| 1 | Chiaki defeated Ryoko Sakimura | Singles match | 9:06 |
| 2 | Chika Goto defeated Yuuki Minami | Singles match | 7:25 |
| 3 | Nao Ishikawa and Rea Seto defeated Naho Yamada and Riara | Tag team match | 7:05 |
| 4 | Mirai and Misa Matsui defeated Miku Aono and Natsumi Showzuki | Tag team match | 12:46 |
| 5 | Utami Hayashishita defeated Megaton | Singles match | 5:30 |
| 6 | Victoria Yuzuki (c) defeated Yuki Mashiro | Singles match for the Marigold Super Fly Championship | 8:00 |
| 7 | Mai Sakurai (c) defeated Nagisa Nozaki | Singles match for the Marigold United National Championship | 16:02 |
| 8 | Nanae Takahashi and Seri Yamaoka defeated Bozilla and Tank (c) | Tag team match for the Marigold Twin Star Championship | 19:32 |
(c) / – the champion(s) heading into the match

== Night 3 ==
Marigold New Year's Golden Garden 2025 (Night 3)
- Promotion: Dream Star Fighting Marigold
- Date: February 20, 2025
- City: Tokyo, Japan
- Venue: Korakuen Hall
- Attendance: 778

=== Event ===
The event started with the tag team confrontation between Minami Yuuki and Ryoko Sakimura, and Rea Seto and Riara, solded with the victory of the latter team. Next up, Nao Ishikawa picked up a victory over Megaton in singles competition. The third bout saw Chiaki, Misa Matsui and Nagisa Nozaki defeat Chika Goto, Miku Aono and Natsumi Showzuki in six-woman tag team competition. Next up, Bozilla defeated Mirai to become the number one contender for the Marigold World Championship. She would come up short against Utami Hayashishita at Marigold Spring Victory Series 2025. In the semi main event, Mai Sakurai defeated Chanyota to secure the second consecutive defense of the Marigold United National Championship in that respective reign.

In the main event, Nanae Takahashi and Seri Yamaoka defeated Utami Hayashishita and Victoria Yuzuki to secure the first defense of the Marigold Twin Star Championship in that respective reign.

=== Results ===
| No. | Results | Stipulations | Times |
|---|---|---|---|
| 1 | Rea Seto and Riara defeated Minami Yuuki and Ryoko Sakimura | Tag team match | 9:23 |
| 2 | Nao Ishikawa defeated Megaton | Singles match | 6:56 |
| 3 | Darkness Revolution (Chiaki, Misa Matsui and Nagisa Nozaki) defeated Chika Goto, Miku Aono and Natsumi Showzuki | Six-woman tag team match | 11:43 |
| 4 | Bozilla defeated Mirai | Singles match to determine the #1 contender to the Marigold World Championship | 18:27 |
| 5 | Mai Sakurai (c) defeated Chanyota | Singles match for the Marigold United National Championship | 14:40 |
| 6 | Nanae Takahashi and Seri Yamaoka (c) defeated Utami Hayashishita and Victoria Yuzuki | Tag team match for the Marigold Twin Star Championship | 24:33 |
(c) / – the champion(s) heading into the match
