= Senka Akatsuki =

Japanese wrestler (born 2006)

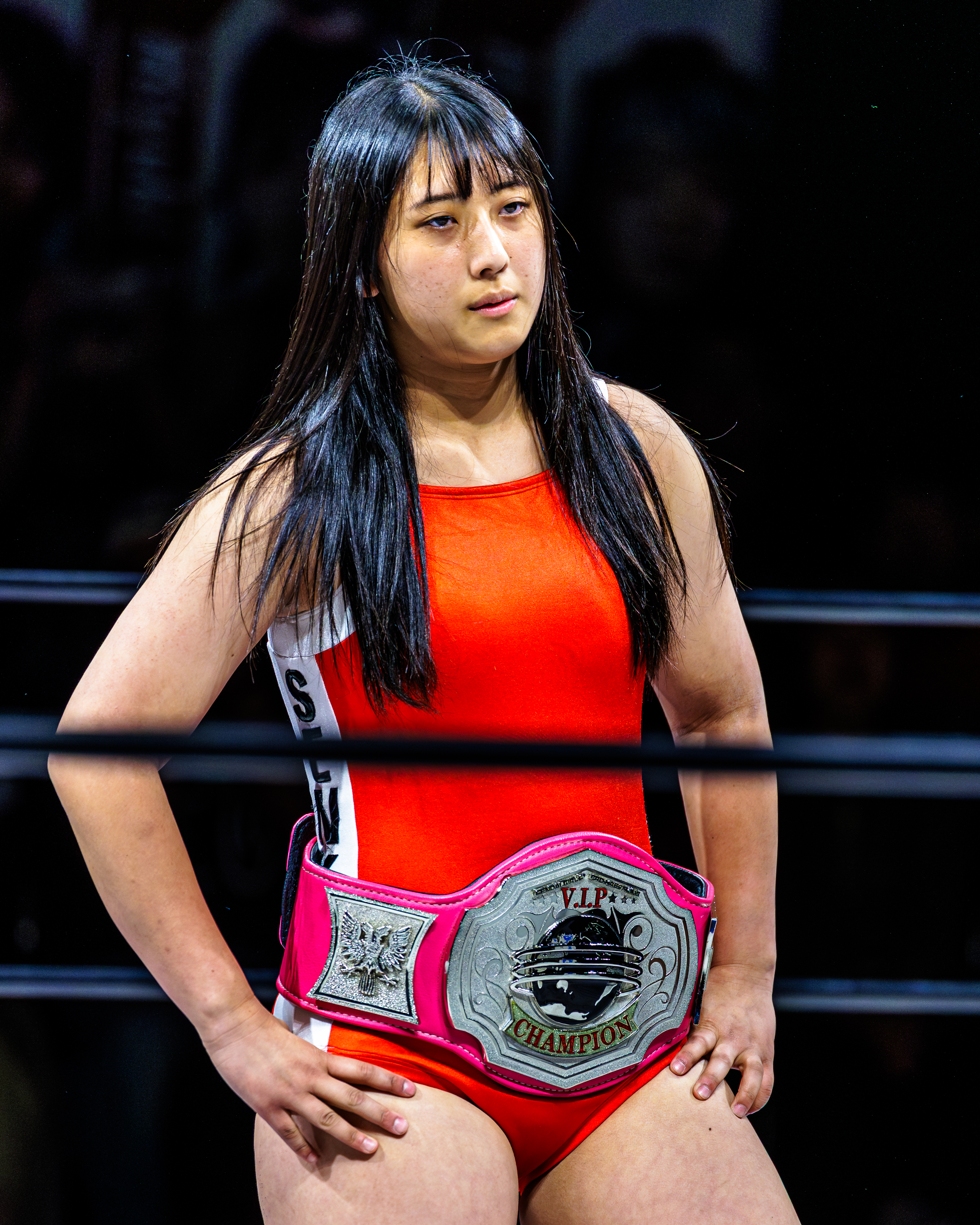
- Akatsuki in May 2026

Personal information
- Born: 30 March 2006 (age 20) Kaga, Japan

Professional wrestling career
- Ring name: Senka Akatsuki
- Billed height: 166 cm (5 ft 5 in)
- Billed weight: 68 kg (150 lb)
- Trained by: Chigusa Nagayo; Takumi Iroha; Mio Momono
- Debut: 2024

Senka Akatsuki (暁千華, Akatsuki Senka) is a Japanese professional wrestler signed to Marvelous That's Women Pro Wrestling. She is also known for working with various promotions of the Japanese independent scene such as Sendai Girls' Pro Wrestling.

== Professional wrestling career ==
=== Marvelous That's Women Pro Wrestling (2024–present) ===
Akatsuki made her professional wrestling debut in Marvelous That's Women Pro Wrestling at a house show promoted on October 27, 2024, where she fell short to Sareee. During her time with the promotion, she chased for various accomplishments. On June 27, 2025, she teamed up with Sora Ayame to unsuccessfully challenge Takumi Iroha and Sareee for the AAAW Tag Team Championship. At her First Anniversary Show from October 19, 2025, Akatsuki unsuccessfully challenged Iroha for the AAAW Single Championship.

=== Japanese independent circuit (2024–present) ===
Akatsuki competes in the Japanese independent scene as a developmental talent sent by Marvelous. She often competes in the "Monday Magic" series of events promoted by Pro Wrestling Noah. She made her debut at NOAH Monday Magic Xtreme Season #1 on October 6, 2025, where she teamed up with Mio Momono and Takumi Iroha, wrestling Mayu Iwatani, Seri Yamaoka and Utami Hayashishita into a time-limit draw.

In Sendai Girls' Pro Wrestling, Akatsuki won the 2025 edition of the Jaja Uma Tournament by defeating Miku Kanae in the first rounds, Yuna in the semifinals, and Spike Nishimura in the finals. She then went into winning the Sendai Girls Junior Championship at a house show from January 23, 2026, by defeating Yuna.

=== Dream Star Fighting Marigold (2025–present) ===
Akatsuki made her debut in Dream Star Fighting Marigold at Marigold Spring Victory Series 2025 on March 30, where she teamed up with Takumi Iroha to unsuccessfully challenge Nanae Takahashi and Seri Yamaoka for the Marigold Twin Star Championship. At Marigold Shine Forever 2025 on May 24, Akatsuki competed twice. First, in an elimination ten-woman tag team match in which she teamed up with Riko Kawahata, Maria, Sora Ayame and Ai Houzan in a losing effort against Rea Seto, Hummingbird, Komomo Minami, Nao Ishikawa and Natsumi Showzuki, and secondly taking part in a spinoff of Nanae Takahashi's retirement match in which she alongside Seri Yamaoka, Kouki Amarei, Yumiko Hotta and Momoe Nakanishi fought Takahashi in a gauntlet bout. Akatsuki won a qualifier match to enter the 2025 Marigold Dream Star GP by defeating Nagisa Tachibana, Komomo Minami, and Hummingbird, but pulled out of the competition due to sustaining an injury. At Marigold Burning Desire 2025 on July 16, Akatsuki teamed up with Sora Ayame to unsuccessfully challenge Victoria Yuzuki and Seri Yamaoka in tag team competition.

== Championships and accomplishments ==
- Sendai Girls' Pro Wrestling
  - Sendai Girls Junior Championship (1 time)
