= Marigold Shine Forever 2025 =

2025 Dream Star Fighting Marigold event

- Promotional poster for the event
- Promotion: Dream Star Fighting Marigold
- Date: May 24, 2025
- City: Tokyo, Japan
- Venue: Yoyogi National Gymnasium
- Attendance: 2,450

Event chronology
← Previous; Spring Victory Series 2025	Next → Burning Desire 2025

Shine Forever chronology
← Previous; First	Next → 2026

Marigold Shine Forever 2025 was a professional wrestling event promoted by Dream Star Fighting Marigold. It took place on May 24, 2025, in Tokyo, Japan at the Yoyogi National Gymnasium. The event aired globally on CyberFight's video-on-demand service Wrestle Universe.

== Production ==
=== Background ===
The show featured professional wrestling matches that result from scripted storylines, where wrestlers portrayed villains, heroes, or less distinguishable characters in the scripted events that built tension and culminated in a wrestling match or series of matches.

=== Event ===
The first match of event portrayed the in-ring debut of Michiko Omukai's daughter Shinno who squared off against Mai Sakurai, solding with the victory of the latter via submission.

Next up, Chiaki, Nagisa Nozaki, Misa Matsui and Megaton picked up a victory over Chanyota, Erina Yamanaka, Nagisa Tachibana and Ryoko Sakimura. In the third bout, Kouki Amarei and Kizuna Tanaka defeated Chika Goto and Minami Yuuki in tag team competition. The fourth bout saw Team Marigold (Rea Seto, Hummingbird, Komomo Minami, Nao Ishikawa and Natsumi Showzuki) outmatching team Marvelous (Riko Kawahata, Maria, Senka Akatsuki, Sora Ayame and Ai Houzan) in ten-woman tag team competition.

Next up, Takumi Iroha defeated Seri Yamaoka in singles competition. In the sixth bout, Mayu Iwatani defeated Victoria Yuzuki to win the Marigold Super Fly Championship, ending Yuzuki's reign at 141 days and three defenses. In the semi main event, Utami Hayashishita defeated Mirai to secure the third consecutive defense of the Marigold World Championship in that respective reign. After the bout concluded, Takumi Iroha stepped up as Hayashishita's next challenger.

In the main event, Miku Aono defeated Nanae Takahashi in the bout which was billed as Takahashi's retirement match. After the bout concluded, Takahashi wrestled a gauntlet match against Senka Akatsuki, Seri Yamaoka, Kouki Amarei, Yumiko Hotta and former "Nanamomo" tag team partner Momoe Nakanishi, bout which ended in a draw after Takahashi went up to one minute against each of them.

== Results ==
No.	Results	Stipulations	Times
1	Mai Sakurai defeated Shinno by submission	Singles match This was Shinno's in-ring debut match.	12:23
2	Darkness Revolution (Chiaki, Nagisa Nozaki, Misa Matsui and Megaton) defeated Chanyota, Erina Yamanaka, Nagisa Tachibana and Ryoko Sakimura by pinfall	Eight-woman tag team match	9:27
3	Kouki Amarei and Kizuna Tanaka defeated Chika Goto and Minami Yuuki by pinfall	Tag team match	8:58
4	Marigold (Rea Seto, Hummingbird, Komomo Minami, Nao Ishikawa and Natsumi Showzuki) defeated Marvelous (Riko Kawahata, Maria, Senka Akatsuki, Sora Ayame and Ai Houzan) by pinfall	Elimination Ten-woman tag team match	19:26
5	Takumi Iroha defeated Seri Yamaoka by pinfall	Singles match	12:14
6	Mayu Iwatani defeated Victoria Yuzuki (c) by pinfall	Singles match for the Marigold Super Fly Championship	9:58
7	Utami Hayashishita (c) defeated Mirai by pinfall	Singles match for the Marigold World Championship	16:12
8	Miku Aono defeated Nanae Takahashi by pinfall	Singles match This was Takahashi's official retirement match.	22:04
9	Senka Akatsuki, Seri Yamaoka, Kouki Amarei, Yumiko Hotta and Momoe Nakanishi vs. Nanae Takahashi ended in a time-limit draw	Gauntlet match This was a spinoff of Takahashi's retirement match.	5:00
(c) / – the champion(s) heading into the match
