= Marigold First Dream 2025 =

2025 Dream Star Fighting Marigold event

- Promotional poster for the event
- Promotion: Dream Star Fighting Marigold
- Date: January 3, 2025
- City: Tokyo, Japan
- Venue: Ota City General Gymnasium
- Attendance: 1,830

Event chronology
← Previous; Winter Wonderful Fight 2024	Next → New Year's Golden Garden

First Dream chronology
← Previous; First	Next → 2026

Marigold First Dream 2025 was a professional wrestling event promoted by Dream Star Fighting Marigold. It took place on January 3, 2025, in Tokyo, Japan at the Ota City General Gymnasium. The event aired globally on CyberFight's video-on-demand service Wrestle Universe.

== Production ==
=== Background ===
The show featured professional wrestling matches that result from scripted storylines, where wrestlers portrayed villains, heroes, or less distinguishable characters in the scripted events that built tension and culminated in a wrestling match or series of matches.

=== Event ===
The event started with Yuki Mashiro last eliminating Minami Yuuki to win the New Year's Dream Rumble match. After the bout concluded, Mashiro laid a challenge for the Marigold Super Fly Championship. Next up, Mirai defeated Seri Yamaoka in the latter's in-ring debut match. The third bout saw Victoria Yuzuki defeating Natsumi Showzuki to win the Marigold Super Fly Championship, ending the latter's reign at 174 days and three defenses. Next up, Bozilla and Tank defeated Dark Wolf Army (Nagisa Nozaki and Chiaki) to win the Marigold Twin Star Championship, ending the latter team's reign at 21 days and one successful defense. The fifth bout saw Nanae Takahashi and Nao Ishikawa picking up a victory over Meiko Satomura and Yuna in tag team competition. In the sixth bout, Kouki Amarei defeated Chika Goto to secure the first successful defense of the GHC Women's Championship in that respective reign. In the semi main event, Mai Sakurai defeated Miku Aono to win the Marigold United National Championship, ending the latter's reign at 174 days and three defenses.

In the main event, 2024 Dream Star Grand Prix winner Utami Hayashishita defeated Sareee to win the Marigold World Championship, ending the latter's reign at 174 days and two defenses. After the bout concluded, Tank laid a challenge to Hayashishita's title on further notice.

== Results ==
No.	Results	Stipulations	Times
1	Yuki Mashiro won by last eliminating Minami Yuuki (Note: Other participants were Misa Matsui, Hummingbird, Rea Seto, Minami Yuuki, Naho Yamada, Ryoko Sakimura, Nagisa Tachibana, Hamuko Hoshi, Riara, Momoka Hanazono, Nightshade and Flying Penguin.)	New Year's Dream Rumble match	20:25
2	Mirai defeated Seri Yamaoka (Note: This was Yamaoka's in-ring debut match. The match originally ended in a time limit draw but was allowed to continue.)	Singles match	7:14
3	Victoria Yuzuki defeated Natsumi Showzuki (c)	Singles match for the Marigold Super Fly Championship	13:14
4	Bozilla and Tank defeated Dark Wolf Army (Nagisa Nozaki and Chiaki) (c)	Tag team match for the Marigold Twin Star Championship	7:10
5	The Passion Sisters (Nanae Takahashi and Nao Ishikawa) defeated Meiko Satomura and Yuna	Tag team match	16:46
6	Kouki Amarei (c) defeated Chika Goto	Singles match for the GHC Women's Championship	8:21
7	Mai Sakurai defeated Miku Aono (c)	Singles match for the Marigold United National Championship	25:17
8	Utami Hayashishita defeated Sareee (c)	Singles match for the Marigold World Championship	22:23
(c) / – the champion(s) heading into the match
