= Riara =

Japanese professional wrestler

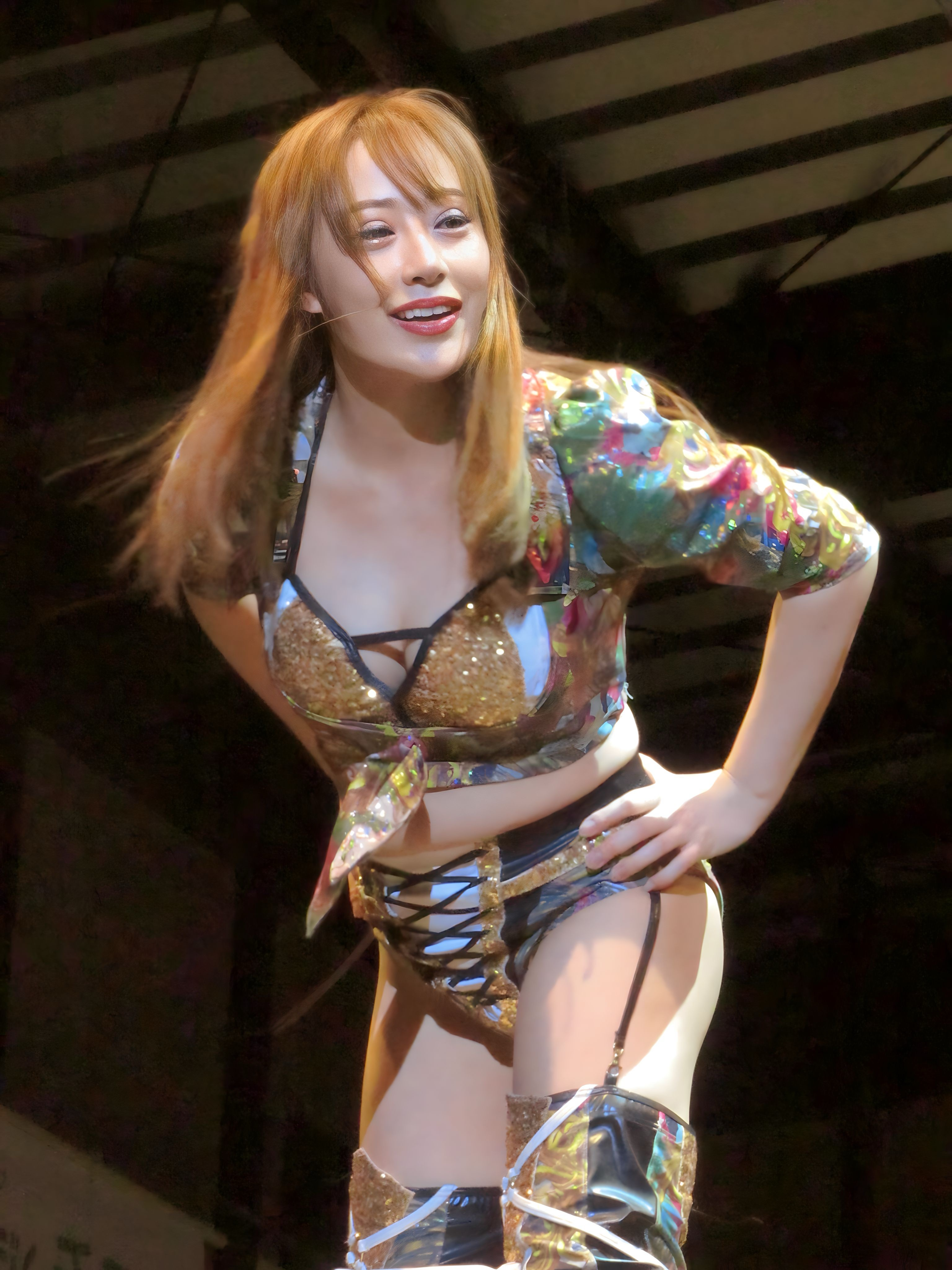
- Riara in January 2024

Personal information
- Born: 23 March 1989 (age 37) Kurihara, Japan

Professional wrestling career
- Ring name: Riara
- Billed height: 155 cm (5 ft 1 in)
- Billed weight: 49 kg (108 lb)
- Debut: 2023

Riara (リアラ, Riara) is a Japanese professional wrestler currently working as a freelancer and is best known for her tenures with various promotions from the Japanese independent scene such as Dream Star Fighting Marigold, Ganbare Pro-Wrestling and Pro Wrestling Wave.

== Professional wrestling career ==
=== Japanese independent scene (2023–present) ===
Riara made her professional wrestling debut in Ganbare Pro-Wrestling at Ganbare Pro GanJo Restart '23 on April 1, 2023, where she wrestled Moeka Haruhi into a time-limit draw.

At Wrestle Princess IV, an event promoted by Tokyo Joshi Pro-Wrestling on October 9, 2023, Riara teamed up with Harukaze and Yoshiko Hasegawa in a losing effort against Arisu Endo, Himawari and Kaya Toribami.

=== Pro Wrestling Wave (2024) ===
Riara competed in two of Pro Wrestling Wave's signature events. In the Catch the Wave tournament, she made her first appearance at the 2024 edition of the competition where she Block B of the "Young Block" branch, scoring one point after going against Ranna Yagami, ChiChi and Mizuki Kato, failing to qualify to the finals. As for the Dual Shock Wave, she made her first appearance at the 2024 edition where she teamed up with Natsu Sumire and drew against Itsuki Aoki and Kakeru Sekiguchi in the first rounds, fell short to SPiCEAP (Maika Ozaki and Tae Honma) in the second ones, then fell short again to Aoki and Sekiguchi in the semifinals.

=== Dream Star Fighting Marigold (2025–present) ===
Riara made her debut in Dream Star Fighting Marigold at Marigold First Dream 2025 on January 3, where she competed in a New Year's Dream Rumble match won by Yuki Mashiro and also involving various other notable opponents such as Misa Matsui, Hamuko Hoshi, Momoka Hanazono, Nightshade and others. On the second night of the Marigold New Year's Golden Garden 2025 from January 19, Riara teamed up with Naho Yamada in a losing effort against Nao Ishikawa and Rea Seto. On the third night from February 20, she teamed up with Seto to defeat Minami Yuuki and Ryoko Sakimura. At Marigold Spring Victory Series 2025 on March 30, Riara teamed up with Hummingbird to defeat Ryoko Sakimura and Nagisa Tachibana.

== Championships and accomplishments ==
- DDT Pro-Wrestling
  - Ironman Heavymetalweight Championship (1 time)
