= Tank (female wrestler) =

Dutch professional wrestler

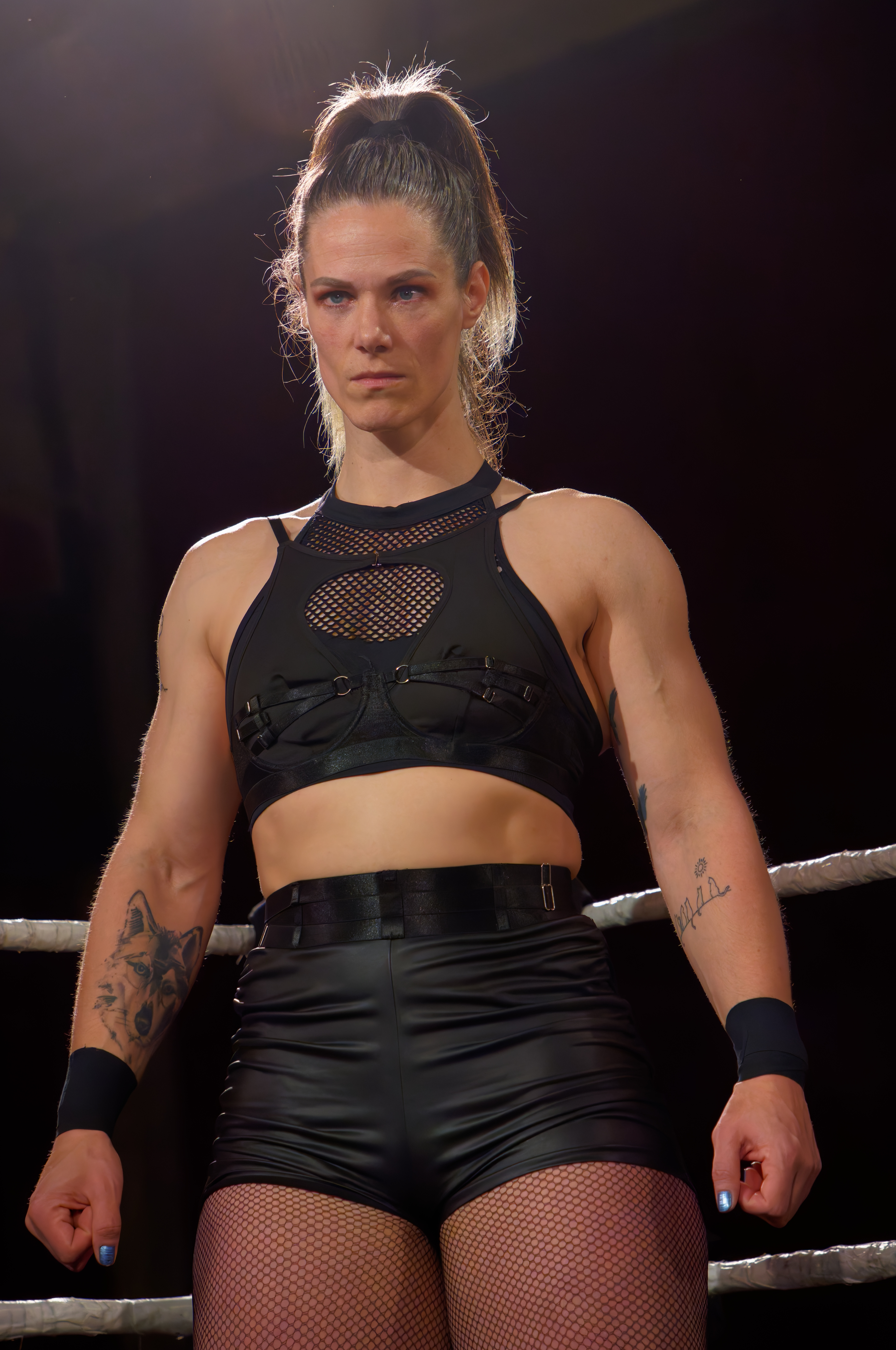
- Tank in October 2024

Personal information
- Born: Netherlands
- Spouse: KāFa

Professional wrestling career
- Ring name: Kris Tank
- Billed height: 180 cm (5 ft 11 in)
- Billed weight: 92 kg (203 lb)
- Trained by: Tom Baron Chong; Michael Dante; Tengkwa
- Debut: 2023

Tank is the ring name of a Dutch professional wrestler and bodybuilder. She most recently competed in Dream Star Fighting Marigold where she is a former Marigold Twin Star Champion. She is primarily known for her tenure with Westside Xtreme Wrestling (wXw) and Pro Wrestling Holland (PWH).

== Professional wrestling career ==
=== European independent scene ===
==== Pro Wrestling Holland (2023–present) ====
Tank made her professional wrestling debut on 19 February 2023, in Pro Wrestling Holland, a promotion from the Dutch independent scene. During her tenure with it, she has won the PWH Women's Championship on two separate occasions.

==== Westside Xtreme Wrestling (2023–present) ====
Tank made her debut in Westside Xtreme Wrestling at the wXw @ Blacklist Festival from 7 October 2023, where she teamed up with Kris Bishop to defeat Anil Marik and Norman Harras. At wXw Shortcut To The Top 2024, she competed in the traditional battle royal for the number one condentership at the wXw Unified World Wrestling Championship won by Peter Tihanyi and also involving other notable opponents, both male and female such as Anita Vaughan, Axel Tischer, Michael Oku, Oskar Leube and Aigle Blanc. At the 2024 edition of the wXw Femmes Fatales event, Tank fell short to Ava Everett in a non-tournament singles bout.

=== Dream Star Fighting Marigold (2025) ===
Dream Star Fighting Marigold announced Tank as Bozilla's mysterious tag team partner for Marigold First Dream 2025 on 3 January, event in which the two defeated Dark Wolf Army (Nagisa Nozaki and Chiaki) to win the Marigold Twin Star Championship, making her the promotion's first-ever wrestler to win a title at their debut. Following that, she allinged herself with Bozilla and Megaton in a proto-faction which was one of the first type of stable-like entities in Marigold. On the first night of the Marigold New Year's Golden Garden 2025 from 13 January, she unsuccessfully challenged Utami Hayashishita for the Marigold World Championship. On the second night on 19 January, she and Bozilla lost the Marigold Twin titles to Nanae Takahashi and Seri Yamaoka.

== Personal life ==
Besides professional wrestling, Tank is also a former fitness champion. During an interview released in January 2025, she cited her husband KāFa who is a fellow professional wrestler as her inspiration to start her in-ring career. She also stated that her gimmick is based on Imperator Furiosa of the Mad Max franchise and that her ring attire was a tribute to Chyna.

== Championships and accomplishments ==
- Dream Star Fighting Marigold
  - Marigold Twin Star Championship (1 time) – with Bozilla
- Pro Wrestling Holland
  - PWH Women's Championship (2 times)
