= Nightshade (wrestler) =

English professional wrestler

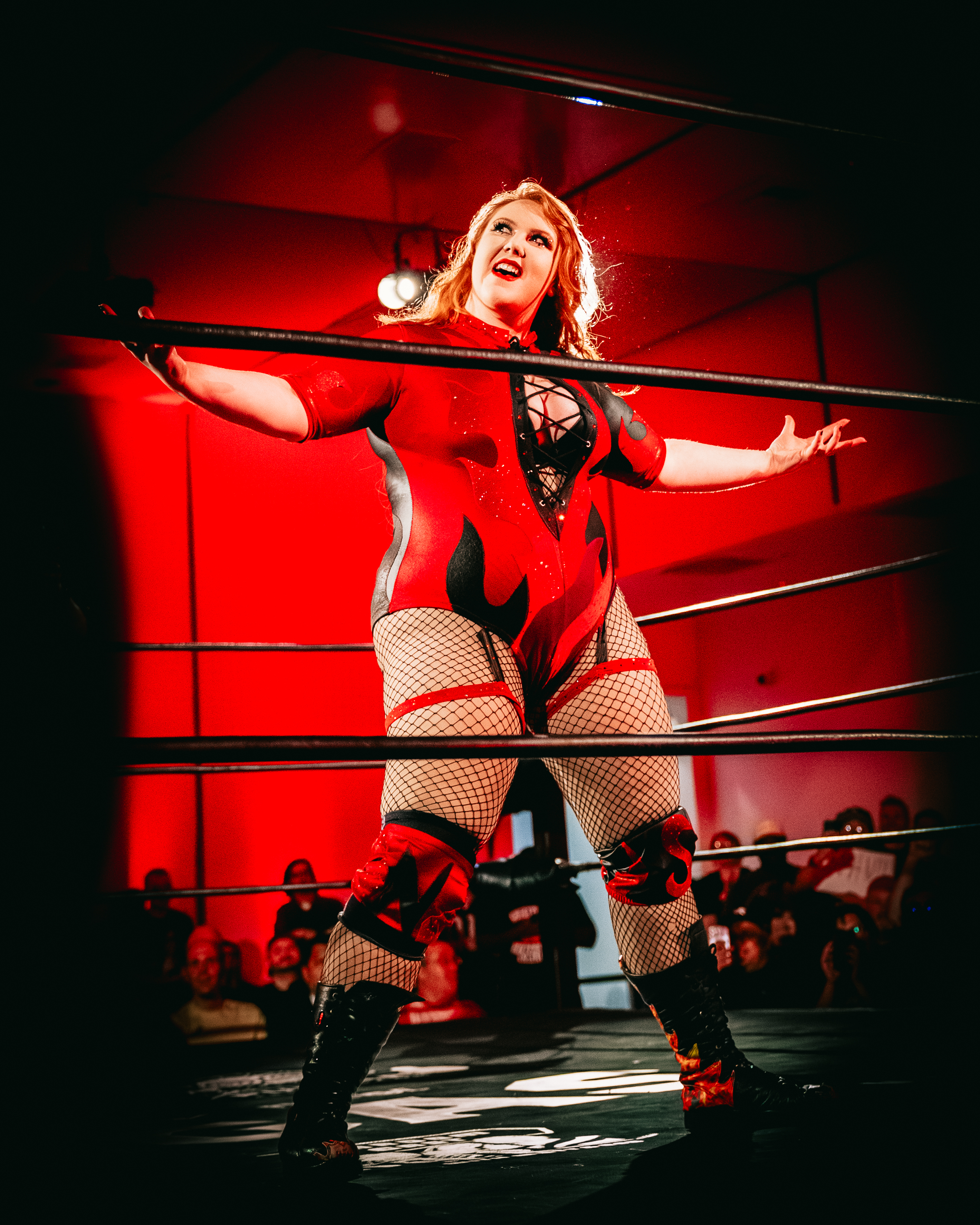
- Nightshade in April 2025

Personal information
- Born: 31 July 1996 (age 30) Buckingham, England

Professional wrestling career
- Ring name: Nightshade
- Billed height: 167 cm (5 ft 6 in)
- Billed weight: 77 kg (170 lb)
- Debut: 2014

Lucy Gibbs better known by her ring name Nightshade is an English professional wrestler best known for her tenure with Pro-Wrestling: EVE where she is a former EVE Tag Team Champion and an EVE Champion. She is also known for working in various promotions of the British independent scene.

== Professional wrestling career ==
=== British independent circuit (2014–present) ===
Gibbs made her professional wrestling debut in National Wrestling Alliance New Breed Wrestling, at a house show from May 3, 2014, where she was billed as the defending TAW Women's Champion as she outmatched Nadia Sapphire. Gibbs is known for her tenures with various British promotions such as Pro Championship Wrestling (PCW UK), Revolution Championship Wrestling (RCW), United Kingdom Professional Wrestling (UKPW) and many others.

=== Pro-Wrestling: EVE (2018–present) ===
Gibbs is best known for her tenure with Pro-Wrestling: EVE. She made her debut at EVE Shevivor Series on December 8, 2018, where she teamed up with Baynz, Charli Evans, Jamie Hayter as part of "Team Hayter" to defeat "Team Wolf" (Kanji, Kris Wolf, Roxxy and Sadie Gibbs).

During her tenure with the promotion, she chased for various championships. At EVE 119: Beers, Brawls And Bad-Ass Bitches on March 7, 2024, Gibbs teamed up with "Operation SAS" tag team partner Skye Smitson to defeat The Royal Aces (Charlie Morgan and Jetta) for the Pro-Wrestling: EVE Tag Team Championship. At EVE 134: Punkin' Instigators on May 2, 2025, she defeated Nina Samuels to win the Pro-Wrestling: EVE Championship.

Gibbs competed in the Wrestle Queendom series of events. At the 2021 edition from on August 27, she took part into a rumble match disputed for the Pro-Wrestling: EVE Championship won by Jetta and also involving the likes of Rhia O'Reilly, Alex Windsor, Rhia O'Reilly, Zoe Lucas, Lana Austin and others. At the same event, Gibbs also competed in a gauntlet match for the Pro-Wrestling: EVE International Championship won by reigning and retaining champion Kasey which also involved Debbie Keitel, Emersyn Jayne, Hyan and Maddison Miles.

=== Japanese independent circuit (2019–present) ===
Gibbs debuted in the Japanese independent scene by sporadically competing for Tokyo Joshi Pro-Wrestling. She made her debut at TJPW Fall Tour '19 Best Regards! on November 16, 2019, where she unsuccessfully challenged Maki Ito for the International Princess Championship. At Wrestle Princess III on October 9, 2022, Gibbs teamed up with "The Uprising" tag team partner Rhia O'Reilly to unsuccessfully challenge Reiwa AA Cannon (Saki Akai and Yuki Arai) for the Princess Tag Team Championship.

After a two-year absence from the Japanese scene, Gibbs returned in late 2024. At Monday Magic Vol. 3, an event promoted by Pro Wrestling Noah on November 11, 2024, Gibbs competed in a 10-woman battle royal for the inaugural GHC Women's Championship, bout won by Kouki Amarei and also involving Bozilla, Chigusa Nagayo, Great Sakuya, Miku Aono, Miyuki Takase, Sadie Gibbs, Takumi Iroha, Utami Hayashishita and Yuu. At Marigold First Dream 2025, an event promoted by Dream Star Fighting Marigold on January 3, Gibbs competed in a New Year's Dream Rumble match won by Yuki Mashiro and also involving various other notable opponents such as Misa Matsui, Hamuko Hoshi, Momoka Hanazono, Riara and others. At Marvelous Happy New Year's Marvelous, an event promoted by Marvelous That's Women Pro Wrestling on January 4, 2025, she unsuccessfully challenged Takumi Iroha for the AAAW Single Championship.

== Championships and accomplishments ==
- Dynamic Over-The-Top Action Wrestling
  - DOA UK Women's Championship (1 time)
- Immortal Wrestling
  - IW Women's Championship (1 time, current)
- Marvelous That's Women Pro Wrestling
  - AAAW Tag Team Championship (1 time, current) – with Nyla Rose
- National Wrestling Alliance New Breed Wrestling
  - TAW Women's Championship (1 time)
- New Wrestling Evolution
  - NWE Women's Championship (1 time, current)
- Pro Championship Wrestling
  - PCW Women's Championship (1 time)
- Pro Wrestling East
  - PWE Women's Championship (1 time, current)
- Pro Wrestling Illustrated
  - Ranked No. 81 of the top 250 female wrestlers in the PWI Women's 250 in 2025
- Pro-Wrestling: EVE
  - Pro-Wrestling: EVE Championship (1 time)
  - Pro-Wrestling: EVE Tag Team Championship (1 time) – with Skye Smitson
- Revolution Championship Wrestling
  - RCW Women's Championship (1 time)
  - RCW World Cup (2022)
- Wulfrun Pro Wrestling
  - WPW Women's Championship (1 time)
