= Marigold Twin Star Championship =

Professional wrestling women's tag team championship

- Current title design (2024–present)

Details
- Promotion: Dream Star Fighting Marigold
- Date established: May 15, 2024
- Current champions: tWin toWer (Kouki Amarei and Chika Goto)
- Date won: May 23, 2026
Statistics
- First champions: Mirai and Mai Sakurai
- Most reigns: As a team (all titleholders) As an individual (2 reigns): Chiaki
- Longest reign: Darkness Revolution (Misa Matsui and Chiaki) (209 days)
- Shortest reign: Bozilla and Tank (16 days)
- Oldest champion: Nanae Takahashi (46 years and 27 days)
- Youngest champion: Seri Yamaoka (18 years, 2 months and 6 days)
- Heaviest champion: Bozilla (205 lbs)
- Lightest champion: Misa Matsui (112 lb)

The Marigold Twin Star Championship (Japanese: マリーゴールド・ツインスター王座, Hepburn: Marīgōrudo Tsuinsutā Ōza) is a women's professional wrestling tag team championship created and promoted by the Dream Star Fighting Marigold promotion.

== Title history ==
On April 15, 2024, Dream Star Fighting Marigold was established. On May 15, Marigold confirmed that the Marigold Twin Star Championship, named after the Twin Star of Arsion Championship, would be one of the titles contested for in the promotion's tag team division. On July 30, Mirai and Mai Sakurai became the inaugural champions by defeating Miku Aono and Natsumi Showzuki in the finals of an eight-team tournament.

=== Inaugural tournament (2024) ===
On July 15, 2024, Marigold confirmed the participants of the inaugural tournament for the Twin Star Championship alongside the first artwork of the belt main plates.

First round (July 20, 21)
Miku Aono and Natsumi Showzuki	Pin
Selene Flora (Victoria Yuzuki and Kizuna Tanaka)	12:56
The Passion Sisters (Nanae Takahashi and Nao Ishikawa)	N/A
tWin toWer (Kouki Amarei and Chika Goto)	Default
MiraiSaku (Mirai and Mai Sakurai)	Pin
Zayda Steel and Myla Grace	14:58
Rea Seto and Komomo Minami	9:11
Dark Wolf Army (Nagisa Nozaki and Chiaki)	Pin

Semifinals (July 30)
Miku Aono and Natsumi Showzuki	Pin
tWin toWer	12:53
MiraiSaku	Sub
Dark Wolf Army	11:18

Final (July 30)
Miku Aono and Natsumi Showzuki	20:52
MiraiSaku	Pin

== Reigns ==
As of October 24, 2026, there have been a total of seven reigns shared between seven different teams consisting of thirteen different champions, The current champions are tWin toWer (Kouki Amarei and Chika Goto) who are in their first reign as a team as well as individually. They won the title by defeating Darkness Revolution (Misa Matsui and Chiaki) at Marigold Shine Forever 2026 on May 23.

Key
No.	Overall reign number
Reign	Reign number for the specific team—reign numbers for the individuals are in parentheses, if different
Days	Number of days held
Defenses	Number of successful defenses
+	Current reign is changing daily

No.	Champion	Championship change			Reign statistics			Notes	Ref.
No.	Champion	Date	Event	Location	Reign	Days	Defenses	Notes	Ref.
1	MiraiSaku (Mirai and Mai Sakurai)	July 30, 2024	Summer Gold Shine; Night 5	Tokyo, Japan	1	136	4	Defeated Miku Aono and Natsumi Showzuki in the finals of an eight-team tournament to become the inaugural champions.	
2	Dark Wolf Army (Nagisa Nozaki and Chiaki)	December 13, 2024	Winter Wonderful Fight 2024; Night 2	Tokyo, Japan	1	21	1		
3	Bozilla and Tank	January 3, 2025	First Dream 2025	Tokyo, Japan	1	16	0		
4	Passion Parent&Child (Nanae Takahashi and Seri Yamaoka)	January 19, 2025	New Year's Golden Garden 2025; Night 2	Tokyo, Japan	1	111	3		
5	Magenta (Riko Kawahata and Maria)	May 10, 2025	Rising Spirit; Night 9	Osaka, Japan	1	169	1		
6	Darkness Revolution (Misa Matsui and Chiaki)	October 26, 2025	Grand Destiny 2025	Tokyo, Japan	1 (1, 2)	209	6		
7	tWin toWer (Kouki Amarei and Chika Goto)	May 23, 2026	Shine Forever 2026	Tokyo, Japan	1	154+	5		

== Combined reigns ==
As of October 24, 2026.

=== By team ===
†	Indicates the current champions

Rank	Wrestler	No. of reigns	Combined defenses	Combined days
1	Darkness Revolution (Misa Matsui and Chiaki)	1	6	209
2	Magenta (Riko Kawahata and Maria)	1	1	169
3	tWin toWer † (Kouki Amarei and Chika Goto)	1	5	154+
4	MiraiSaku (Mirai and Mai Sakurai)	1	4	136
5	Passion Parent&Child (Nanae Takahashi and Seri Yamaoka)	1	3	111
6	Dark Wolf Army (Nagisa Nozaki and Chiaki)	1	1	21
7	Bozilla and Tank	1	0	16

=== By wrestler ===
Rank	Wrestler	No. of reigns	Combined defenses	Combined days
1	Chiaki	2	7	230
2	Misa Matsui	1	6	209
3	Riko Kawahata	1	1	169
3	Maria	1	1	169
5	Kouki Amarei †	1	5	154+
5	Chika Goto †	1	5	154+
7	Mirai	1	4	136
7	Mai Sakurai	1	4	136
9	Nanae Takahashi	1	3	111
9	Seri Yamaoka	1	3	111
11	Nagisa Nozaki	1	1	21
12	Bozilla	1	0	16
12	Tank	1	0	16

== See also ==
- Women's World Tag Team Championship (disambiguation)
- Goddess of Stardom Championship
