= Mayu Iwatani =

Japanese professional wrestler (born 1993)

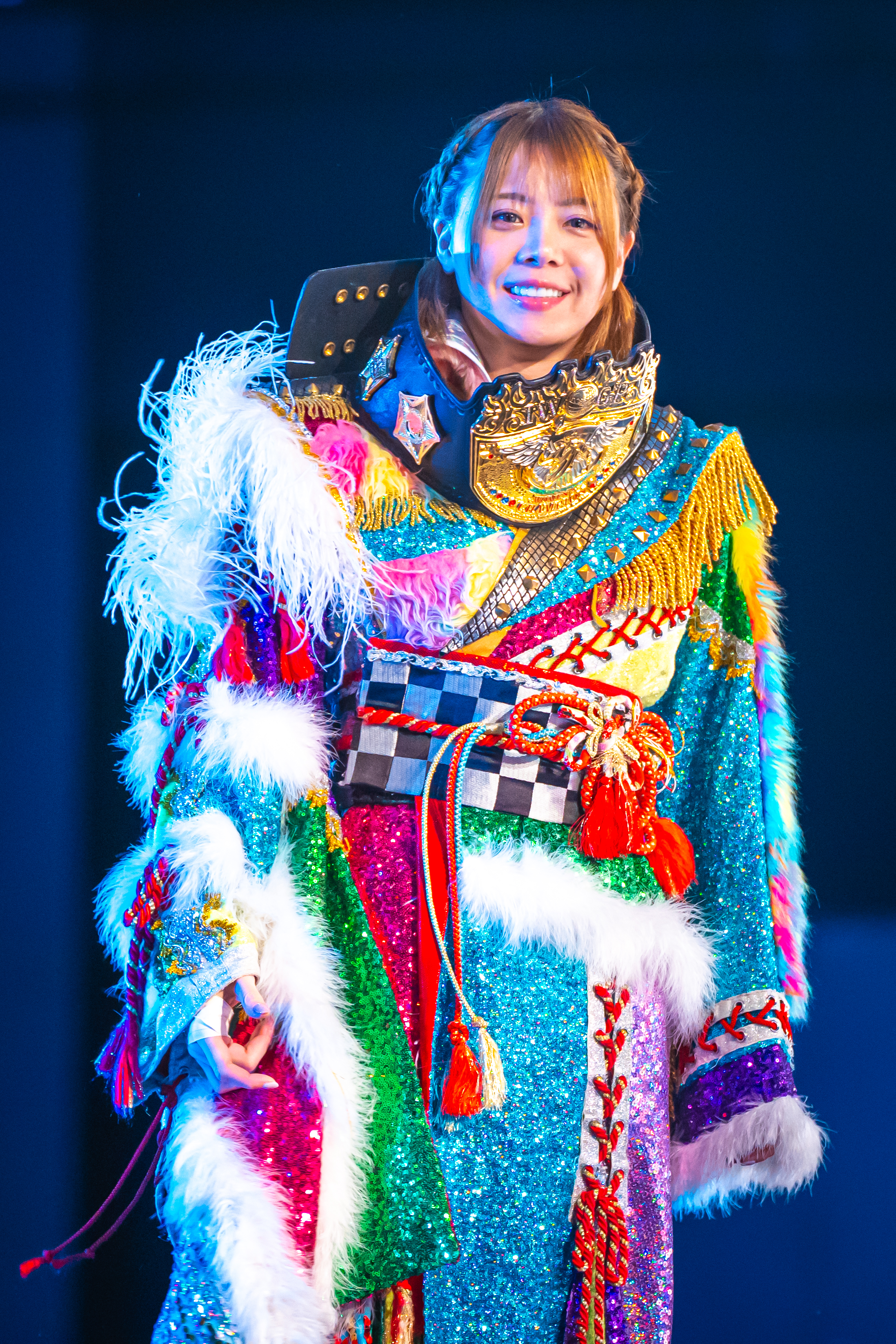
- Iwatani as the IWGP Women's Champion in 2025

Personal information
- Born: February 19, 1993 (age 33) Mine, Yamaguchi, Japan

Professional wrestling career
- Ring name(s): Mayu Iwatani; Mayuchica; Mayuchika; Mayucica; Yurei
- Billed height: 5 ft 5 in (1.65 m)
- Billed weight: 116 lb (53 kg)
- Trained by: Fuka; Nanae Takahashi
- Debut: January 23, 2011

Mayu Iwatani (岩谷 麻由, Iwatani Mayu; ring name: 岩谷 麻優) (born February 19, 1993) is a Japanese professional wrestler, currently signed to Dream Star Fighting Marigold, where she is the current Marigold Super Fly Champion in her first reign. She is also concurrently the Marigold World Champion and the Marigold United National Champion, both in her first reign. She is best known for her tenure with World Wonder Ring Stardom, where she was the leader of Stars. She also wrestled for New Japan Pro Wrestling, where she is a former IWGP Women's Champion, which was the longest reign in the title's history.

Since making her debut in January 2011, she became a two-time World of Stardom Champion, two-time Wonder of Stardom Champion, one-time High Speed Champion, one-time SWA World Champion, two-time Goddesses of Stardom Champion, and a five-time Artist of Stardom Champion, while also having won the Cinderella Tournament back to back in 2015 and 2016, and the 2018 5Star Grand Prix. She also made appearances for Stardom's American partner Ring of Honor, where she is a former one-time Women of Honor World Champion.

Dave Meltzer of the Wrestling Observer Newsletter has called Iwatani and fellow Japanese workers Io Shirai and Kairi Hojo "three of the best wrestlers in the world". She was also recognized as the "ace" of Stardom.

== Early life ==
Iwatani grew up in the countryside of Mine, Yamaguchi with her family, which includes two older brothers. In primary school, she practiced judo and high jump, but in high school, she began isolating herself from society, spending three years mostly indoors. After quitting high school, she fell in love with professional wrestling after seeing a Dragon Gate event. She contacted Fuka, the general manager of the World Wonder Ring Stardom promotion, who were looking for new wrestlers, and eventually moved to Tokyo in 2010 to pursue a career in professional wrestling.

== Professional wrestling career ==
=== World Wonder Ring Stardom (2011–2025) ===
==== Early years (2011–2017) ====
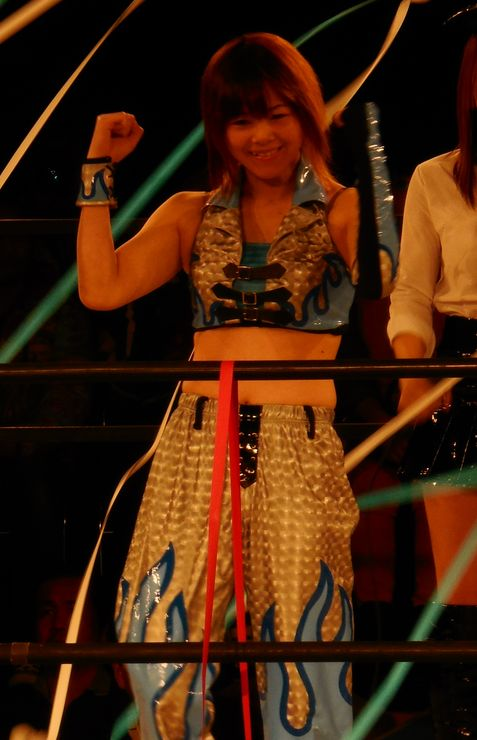
Iwatani in March 2013

Iwatani was part of World Wonder Ring Stardom's first class of trainees. She made her professional wrestling debut at Stardom's inaugural event on January 23, 2011, facing fellow debutante Arisa Hoshiki. Afterwards, Iwatani and Hoshiki formed a tag team named AMA, which became one of Stardom's most popular acts. Despite her popularity, Iwatani was the last of the class one trainees to obtain a win in a professional wrestling ring. In June, she was defeated by Eri Susa, the other winless Stardom trainee, and subsequently became known as Stardom's weakest wrestler. Iwatani was winless for the first eleven months of her career, before finally defeating Susa in a rematch on December 25. Afterwards, Iwatani and Hoshiki became part of Io Shirai's Planet stable, along with Natsumi Showzuki.

Following Hoshiki's retirement from professional wrestling in June 2012, Iwatani began teaming with Io Shirai under the team name Thunder Rock. Iwatani also became part of a stable named Tawashis with Hiroyo Matsumoto and Miho Wakizawa. The three went on to win the Artist of Stardom Championship on December 29, 2013, by defeating Alpha Female, Female Predator Amazon and Kyoko Kimura. On July 27, 2014, Iwatani won her first singles title, when she defeated her teammate Miho Wakizawa for the vacant Wonder of Stardom Championship. After a record-setting eight-month reign, Tawashis lost the Artist of Stardom Championship to Hatsuhinode Kamen, Kaori Yoneyama & Tsubasa Kuragaki on August 10, 2014. In October and November, Thunder Rock participated in the 2014 Goddesses of Stardom Tag League. They reached the finals, where they were defeated by Kairi Hojo and Nanae Takahashi.

On January 18, 2015, Iwatani lost the Wonder of Stardom Championship to Act Yasukawa. On April 23, 2015, Iwatani won the first annual Cinderella Tournament, defeating Koguma in the finals. As a result, Iwatani was granted a shot at Stardom's top title, the World of Stardom Championship, but was defeated by the defending champion, Kairi Hojo, on May 17. On May 6, Iwatani & Io Shirai, Thunder Rock, defeated Chelsea & Kairi Hojo to win the vacant Goddesses of Stardom Championship. On October 11, Iwatani defeated Rosa Negra to also win the High Speed Championship. During their tag team title reign, Thunder Rock also won the 2015 Goddesses of Stardom Tag League. On February 28, 2016, Iwatani became a triple champion, when she, Shirai & Kairi Hojo, billed together as "Threedom" (a combination of the words "Three" and "Stardom"), defeated Evie, Hiroyo Matsumoto & Kellie Skater for the Artist of Stardom Championship. In April, Iwatani, along with Hojo & Shirai, traveled to the United States to take part in events held by Lucha Underground and Vendetta Pro Wrestling. On April 29, Iwatani won her second Cinderella Tournament in a row, defeating Hiroyo Matsumoto in the finals. As a result, Iwatani received another shot at the World of Stardom Championship, but was defeated by Io Shirai on May 15. After setting records for both the longest reign and most successful title defenses, Iwatani & Shirai lost the Goddesses of Stardom Championship to Kagetsu & Kyoko Kimura in their 11th title defense on June 16. On October 2, Threedom lost the Artist of Stardom Championship to Hana Kimura, Kagetsu & Kyoko Kimura in their third defense.

On November 11, 2016, both Thunder Rock and Threedom were dissolved, when Shirai turned on Iwatani, after the two had lost to Hojo & Yoko Bito in the finals of the 2016 Goddesses of Stardom Tag League. This led to Iwatani unsuccessfully challenging Shirai for the World of Stardom Championship at Stardom's year-end show on December 22. The following day, the match was named Stardom's 2016 Match of the Year. Reportedly, Iwatani was originally scheduled to win the match and the World of Stardom Championship, but the result was changed after she told Stardom that she wanted to retire from professional wrestling in 2017. After nine successful title defenses, Iwatani lost the High Speed Championship to Kris Wolf in a three-way match, also involving Kagetsu, on February 23, 2017. On April 30, Iwatani made it to the finals of her third Cinderella Tournament in a row, but was this time defeated by Toni Storm. With Storm going after the World of Stardom Championship, Iwatani chose to challenge for the Wonder of Stardom Championship. On May 14, Iwatani defeated Kairi Hojo to win the Wonder of Stardom Championship for the second time. Shortly afterwards, it was reported that Iwatani was no longer considering retirement and was being positioned as Stardom's top star in the wake of Io Shirai and Kairi Hojo's departures from the promotion.

On June 21, 2017, Iwatani defeated Shirai to win the World of Stardom Championship for the first time in her fifth challenge, becoming the first wrestler to simultaneously hold the World and Wonder of Stardom Championships. Afterwards, Iwatani started defending both the World and Wonder of Stardom Championships in separate title matches. On September 23, Iwatani lost the Wonder of Stardom Championship to Yoko Bito in her third defense. The following day, Iwatani lost the World of Stardom Championship to Storm, again in her third defense. The title change was unplanned as the match had to be stopped after only two minutes due to Iwatani legitimately dislocating her elbow, forcing referee Daichi Murayama to award the title to Storm. Iwatani returned to the ring on December 10 to take part in Yoko Bito's final match in Shin-Kiba 1st Ring.

==== Stars leadership (2018–2021) ====
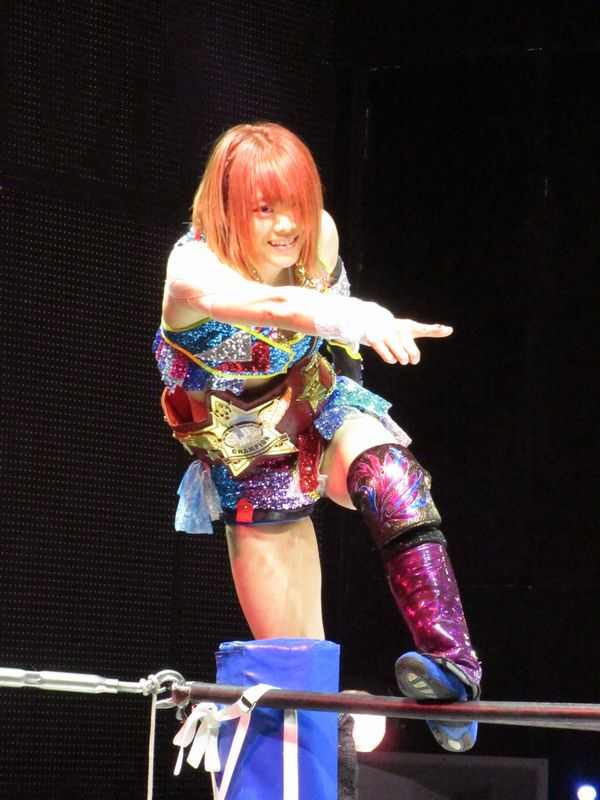
Iwatani in December 2019

Since her return, Iwatani became the leader of a new unit named "Stars" (initially Stardom's Army). On February 18, 2018, Iwatani & Tam Nakano challenged Oedo Tai (Hana Kimura & Kagetsu) for the Goddesses of Stardom Championship but were unsuccessful. On April 1, Iwatani tried to capture again the World of Stardom Championship from Toni Storm after Iwatani was injured in their last match, but was unsuccessful. On June 3, Iwatani, along with Saki Kashima, defeated Hana Kimura & Kagetsu to win the Goddesses of Stardom Championship. On September 24, Iwatani won the 2018 5 Star Grand Prix after defeating Utami Hayashishita in the finals. On September 30, at the afternoon show of 5★Star Grand Champion Carnival, Iwatani won the Artist of Stardom Championship with Kashima & Nakano after defeating J.A.N. (Jungle Kyona, Kaori Yoneyama & Natsuko Tora), however, Iwatani & Kashima lost the Goddesses of Stardom Championship to Kyona & Tora during the evening show. On December 15, Iwatani tore her MCL in an Artist of Stardom Championship defense against Queen's Quest (Konami, Momo Watanabe and Utami Hayashishita). She wrestled in one more match on December 16 before taking a one month break to recover.

In April 2019, Iwatani took another month long break to recover from her knee injury. On May 16, 2019, Stars (Iwatani, Tam Nakano & Saki Kashima) lost the Artist of Stardom Championship to Tokyo Cyber Squad (Hana Kimura, Jungle Kyona & Konami). Stars won the title for the second time on June 23, after defeating Tokyo Cyber Squad. Stars held the title until July 20, when they lost the championship to Andras Miyagi, Kagetsu & Sumire Natsu. On November 4, 2019, Iwatani defeated Bea Priestley to win the World of Stardom Championship for the second time.

At Stardom Cinderella Tournament 2020, Iwatani wrestled Hana Kimura into a time-limit draw during the first-round matches from March 24. At Stardom Yokohama Cinderella 2020 on October 3, 2020, she successfully defended the World of Stardom Championship against Syuri. On November 15, 2020, Iwatani lost the World Championship to Utami Hayashishita, ending her reign at 377 days. At Stardom Osaka Dream Cinderella 2020 on December 20, Iwatani teamed up with Stars stablemates Starlight Kid & Gokigen Death and unsuccessfully challenged the then sub-unit of Stars, Cosmic Angels (Mina Shirakawa, Tam Nakano & Unagi Sayaka) for the Artist of Stardom Championship. After they retained the title, Sayaka, Nakano & Shirakawa announced that they would split up from Stars to act as an independent unit.

Iwatani had competed in the 2021 Cinderella Tournament, making it into the quarterfinals from May 14 where she fell short to Himeka. Iwatani teamed up with Koguma at Yokohama Dream Cinderella 2021 in Summer on July 4, 2021, where they unsuccessfully challenged Syuri & Giulia for the Goddesses of Stardom Championship. At Stardom 5 Star Grand Prix 2021, Iwatani fought in the "Red Stars" block and scored a total of eleven points. At Stardom 10th Anniversary Grand Final Osaka Dream Cinderella on October 9, 2021, she unsuccessfully challenged Tam Nakano for the Wonder of Stardom Championship as the match went into a time-limit draw. At the 2021 Goddesses of Stardom Tag League, Iwatani teamed up with Rin Kadokura as "Blue MaRine" and fought in the "Blue Goddess" block where they scored a total of seven points. At Osaka Super Wars from December 18, Iwatani teamed up with Hazuki & Koguma and took part in a ¥10 Million Unit Tournament which was also contested for the Artist of Stardom Championship by first defeating Cosmic Angels (Tam Nakano, Mina Shirakawa & Unagi Sayaka) in the semi-finals, and eventually falling short to the champions MaiHimePoi (Maika, Natsupoi & Himeka) in the finals on the same night as a result of a Six-Woman Tag Team ladder match.

==== IWGP Women's Champion and departure (2022–2025) ====
At Stardom Nagoya Supreme Fight on January 29, 2022, Iwatani went into a time-limit draw against Giulia in a World of Stardom Championship #1 Contender's Match. On the first night of the Stardom World Climax 2022 from March 26, Iwatani teamed up with Kairi to defeat Tam Nakano & Unagi Sayaka. On the second night from March 27, she unsuccessfully challenged Syuri for the World of Stardom Championship. At the Stardom Cinderella Tournament 2022, she made it to the second round matches from April 10 where she fell short to Saki Kashima. At Stardom Golden Week Fight Tour on May 5, 2022, Iwatani defeated Thekla to win the SWA World Championship. She officially became the second woman to win all the eligible titles in Stardom after Io Shirai, thus becoming the second ever "grand slam champion". At Stardom Flashing Champions on May 28, 2022, she successfully defended the SWA title against Fukigen Death. At Stardom Fight in the Top on June 26, 2022, Iwatani teamed up with Hazuki & Koguma and defeated Queen's Quest's Utami Hayashishita, Saya Kamitani & AZM in one of Stardom's first steel cage matches. At the Stardom 5 Star Grand Prix 2022, Iwatani fought in the "Blue Stars" block where she scored a total of fifteen points.

On August 27, 2022, Iwatani became a participant in a tournament to become the inaugural IWGP Women's Champion. In the first round of the tournament, she defeated Odeo Tai's Momo Watanabe on October 22. At Hiroshima Goddess Festival on November 3, 2022, she defeated Alpha Female to retain the SWA World Championship. On November 3, Iwatani vacated the SWA World Championship in order to focus on the IWGP Women's Championship, as she was announced as a participant to crown its inaugural champion. Iwatani reached to the finals which took part on November 20 at Historic X-Over, where she lost to Kairi. On April 8, 2023, after the IWGP Women's Champion Mercedes Moné retained the title against AZM and Hazuki in a three-way match, Iwatani challenged Moné for the title at Stardom All Star Grand Queendom, which Moné accepted, and slapped Iwatani across the face before leaving the ring. Iwatani defeated Moné at Stardom All Star Grand Queendom to become the new IWGP Women's Champion. On August 13, during Stardom x Stardom: Osaka Summer Team, Iwatani had her first successful title defense against Utami Hayashishita.

On January 4, 2024, at Ittenyon Stardom Gate, Iwatani defeated Syuri to retain the IWGP Women's Championship in the main event. She would also successfully defend the title against Mina Shirakawa, Sareee, Tsukasa Fujimoto, Toni Storm and Momo Watanabe throughout 2024. During the 5 Star Grand Prix 2024, Iwatani would win her block, advancing to the quarterfinals where she defeated Natsupoi, but would lose to Maika in the semifinals. On April 27, 2025, at All Star Grand Queendom 2025, Iwatani lost the IWGP Women's Championship to Syuri, ending her reign at 735 days. On the following day, Iwatani announced her departure from Stardom.

=== Ring of Honor (2017–2019) ===
On December 15, Iwatani made her debut for American promotion Ring of Honor (ROH), when she was announced as part of a tournament to crown the inaugural Women of Honor Champion. At Bound By Honor, Iwatani challenged champion Kelly Klein to a title match, in which she defeated Klein for the title. Iwatani successfully defended the title twice before losing the title back to Klein at the G1 Supercard on April 6, 2019.

=== New Japan Pro-Wrestling (2020–2025) ===
On January 4, 2020, Iwatani along with Arisa Hoshiki, Giulia and Hana Kimura made their debut in New Japan Pro-Wrestling at Wrestle Kingdom 14 in Tokyo Dome in a special Stardom tag team exhibition match. Iwatani continued to work in these kinds of matches, making her next appearance at Wrestle Kingdom 15 on January 5, 2021, where she teamed up with Tam Nakano and fell short to Donna Del Mondo's Syuri and Giulia. At Wrestle Kingdom 16 on January 5, 2022, she teamed up with Starlight Kid and fell short to Tam Nakano and Saya Kamitani. On October 28, 2022, at Rumble on 44th Street, Iwatani successfully defended the SWA World Championship against KiLynn King, being the first to defend a Stardom title in NJPW. On January 4, 2025, at Wrestle Kingdom 19, Iwatani successfully defended the IWGP Women's Championship against AZM.

=== Dream Star Fighting Marigold (2025–present) ===
On May 1, 2025, it was announced that Iwatani has signed with Dream Star Fighting Marigold at a press conference. On May 4 at Rising Spirit, Iwatani made her debut for the promotion, defeating Nanae Takahashi. On May 24, Iwatani defeated Victoria Yuzuki to win the Marigold Super Fly Championship at Shine Forever.

On October 26, 2025, Iwatani faced her former Stardom rival and partner IYO SKY (formerly Io Shirai) in the main event of Grand Destiny, in a losing effort.

=== Pro Wrestling Noah (2025–2026) ===
On May 26, 2025, Iwatani made her Pro Wrestling Noah debut as she teamed up with the GHC Women's Champion Kouki Amarei to defeat Great Sakuya and Sadie Gibbs.

On January 3, 2026, Iwatani defeated Takumi Iroha to win the GHC Women's Championship at First Dream. This made Iwatani the first woman to win both of the IWGP and GHC Women's Championships. On January 24, Iwatani would make her first successful defense against Utami Hayashishita.

On 18 May 2026 Iwatani Vacated the GHC Women’s Championship due to injury

== Other media ==
In August 2020, Iwatani released her own memoir. On June 6, 2022, it was announced that a movie based on Iwatani's memoir, would be produced under the name Runaway Wrestler.

== Championships and accomplishments ==
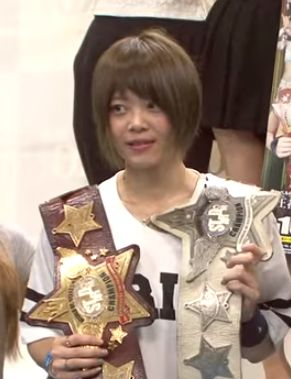
Iwatani is a former two-time Wonder of Stardom Champion (right) and two-time World of Stardom Champion (left)

- Dream Star Fighting Marigold
  - Marigold World Championship (1 time, current)
  - Marigold United National Championship (1 time, current)
  - Marigold Super Fly Championship (1 time, current)
  - Dream★Star GP Award (1 time)
    - Dream League Best Match Award (2025) vs. Victoria Yuzuki on September 14
  - Marigold Year-End Award (1 time)
    - Best Match Award (2025) vs. IYO SKY on October 26
- New Japan Pro-Wrestling
  - IWGP Women's Championship (1 time)
- Pro Wrestling Illustrated
  - Ranked No. 9 of the top 50 female singles wrestlers in the PWI Female 50 in 2018
  - Ranked No. 10 of the top 100 female wrestlers in the PWI Women's 100 in 2020
  - Ranked No. 27 of the top 150 female singles wrestlers in the PWI Women's 150 in 2022
- Pro Wrestling Noah
  - GHC Women's Championship (1 time)
- Ring of Honor
  - Women of Honor World Championship (1 time)
- Tokyo Sports
  - Joshi Puroresu Grand Prize (2019)
  - Topic Award (2024) shared with Bull Nakano and Dump Matsumoto
- World Wonder Ring Stardom
  - Artist of Stardom Championship (5 times) – with Hiroyo Matsumoto and Miho Wakizawa (1), Io Shirai and Takumi Iroha (1), Io Shirai and Kairi Hojo (1), and Saki Kashima and Tam Nakano (2)
  - Goddesses of Stardom Championship (2 times) – with Io Shirai (1) and Saki Kashima (1)
  - High Speed Championship (1 time)
  - Wonder of Stardom Championship (2 times)
  - World of Stardom Championship (2 times)
  - SWA World Championship (1 time)
  - Second Grand Slam Champion
  - Cinderella Tournament (2015, 2016)
  - Goddesses of Stardom Championship Tournament (2015) – with Io Shirai
  - Goddesses of Stardom Tag League (2015) – with Io Shirai
  - Moneyball Tournament (2022) – with Hazuki and Koguma
  - Wonder of Stardom Championship Tournament (2014)
  - 5★Star GP (2018)
  - 5★Star GP Award (5 times)
    - 5★Star GP Best Match Award (2015) vs. Io Shirai on August 23
    - 5★Star GP Best Match Award (2017) vs. Kagetsu on September 18
    - 5★Star GP Fighting Spirit Award (2016)
    - 5★Star GP Outstanding Performance Award (2014)
    - 5★Star GP Red Stars Best Match Award (2021) vs. Giulia on August 1
  - Stardom Year-End Award (12 times)
    - Best Match Award (2016) vs. Io Shirai on December 22
    - Best Match Award (2018) with Io Shirai vs. Kagetsu and Hazuki on June 17
    - Best Match Award (2020) vs. Utami Hayashishita on November 15
    - Best Tag Team Award (2015) with Io Shirai
    - Best Technique Award (2014, 2015)
    - Best Unit Award (2022) as part of Stars, shared with Hanan, Hazuki, Koguma, Momo Kohgo and Saya Iida
    - Fighting Spirit Award (2017)
    - MVP Award (2019)
    - Outstanding Performance Award (2023)
    - Special Merit Award (2021)
    - Best Match Award (2024) vs. Momo Watanabe
