= Chunichi Building =

Building in Sakae, Nagoya, Japan

Coordinates: 35°10′06″N 136°54′35″E

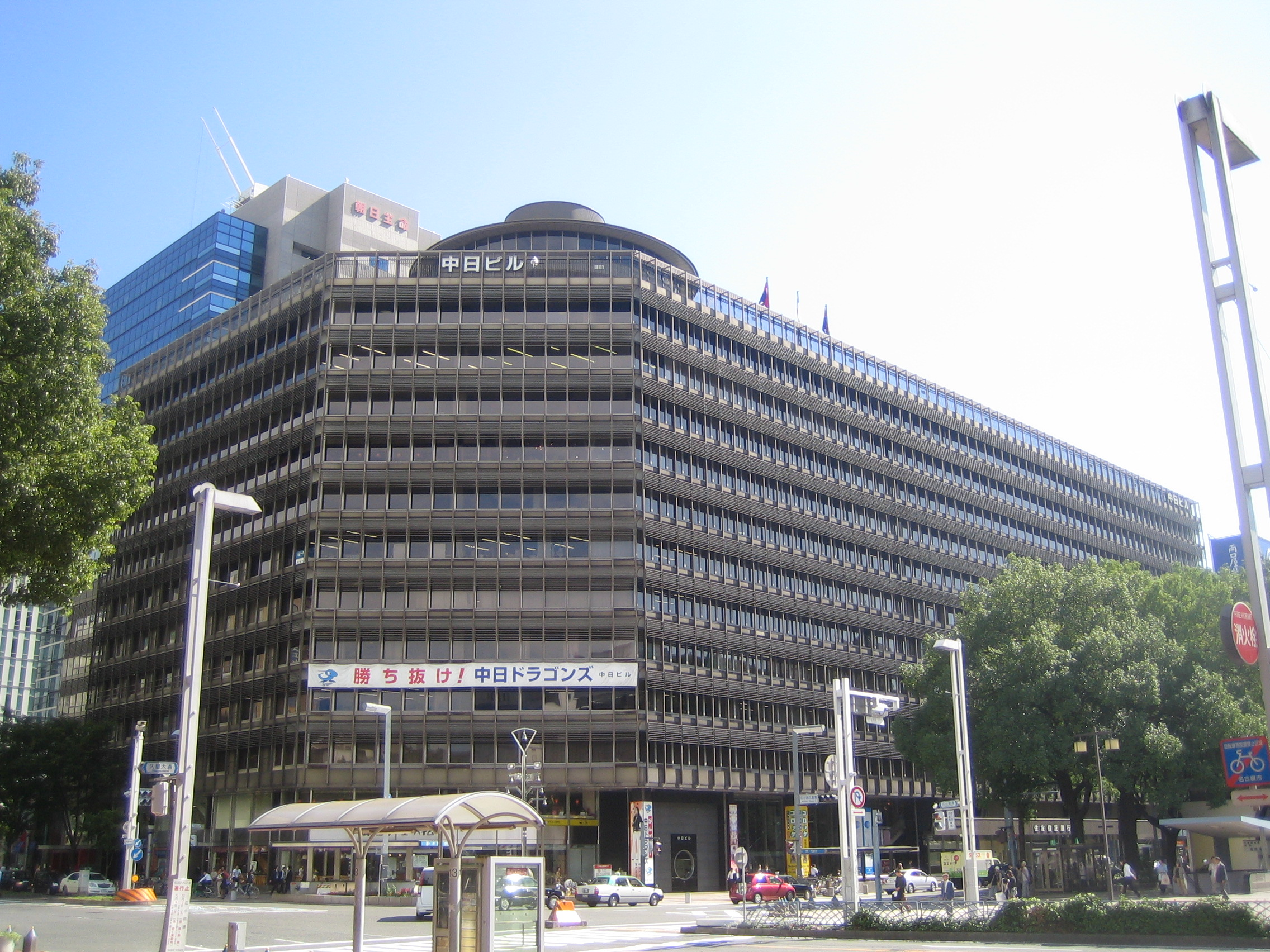
Chunichi Building in Nagoya

The Chunichi Building is located in Sakae, Nagoya, in central Japan. It is located facing Hisaya Ōdori Park. Officially it is called the Chūbu Nippon Building, but is commonly known as the Chunichi Building.

The building was the home of the former Chunichi Theatre.
