= Marigold Super Fly Championship =

Professional wrestling women's championship

- Current title design (2024–present)

Details
- Promotion: Dream Star Fighting Marigold
- Date established: May 15, 2024
- Current champion: Mayu Iwatani
- Date won: May 24, 2025
Statistics
- First champion: Natsumi Showzuki
- Longest reign: Mayu Iwatani (518+ days)
- Shortest reign: Victoria Yuzuki (141 days)
- Oldest champion: Natsumi Showzuki (35 years, 4 months and 18 days)
- Youngest champion: Victoria Yuzuki (19 years, 11 months and 2 days)
- Heaviest champion: Victoria Yuzuki (123 lbs)
- Lightest champion: Mayu Iwatani (110 lbs)

The Marigold Super Fly Championship (Japanese: マリーゴールド・スーパーフライ級王座, Hepburn: Marīgōrudo Sūpāfurai-kyū Ōza), also known as the Marigold Super Flyweight Championship, is a women's professional wrestling championship created and promoted by the Dream Star Fighting Marigold promotion. As the name of the title suggests, it is meant for fast and high-flying wrestlers, weighing 55kg or less.

== History ==
On April 15, 2024, Dream Star Fighting Marigold was established. On May 15, Marigold confirmed that the Marigold Super Flyweight Championship would be one of their titles. The belt design was first unveiled in June. On June 15, a four-way tournament was launched to determine the inaugural champion. On July 13, at Summer Destiny, Natsumi Showzuki became the inaugural champion by defeating Misa Matsui in the finals.

=== Inaugural tournament (2024) ===
Semifinals
Misa Matsui | 6:46
Myla Grace | Pin
Natsumi Showzuki | 10:19
Zayda Steel | Pin

Finals
Misa Matsui | 14:51
Natsumi Showzuki | Pin

== Reigns ==
As of October 24, 2026, there have been a total of three reigns shared between three different wrestlers. Natsumi Showzuki was the inaugural champion. The current champion is Mayu Iwatani, who is in her first reign. She won the title by defeating Victoria Yuzuki at Shine Forever on May 24, 2025, in Tokyo, Japan.

Key
| No. | Overall reign number |
| Reign | Reign number for the specific champion |
| Days | Number of days held |
| Defenses | Number of successful defenses |
| + | Current reign is changing daily |

| No. | Champion | Championship change | | | Reign statistics | | | Notes | Ref. |
| No. | Champion | Date | Event | Location | Reign | Days | Defenses | Notes | Ref. |
|---|---|---|---|---|---|---|---|---|---|
| 1 | Natsumi Showzuki | July 13, 2024 | Summer Destiny | Tokyo, Japan | 1 | 174 | 4 | Defeated Misa Matsui in the finals of a four-woman single-elimination tournament to become the inaugural champion. | |
| 2 | Victoria Yuzuki | January 3, 2025 | First Dream | Tokyo, Japan | 1 | 141 | 3 | | |
| 3 | Mayu Iwatani | May 24, 2025 | Shine Forever | Tokyo, Japan | 1 | 518+ | 8 | | |

== See also ==
- High Speed Championship
