= Maria (Japanese wrestler) =

Japanese professional wrestler

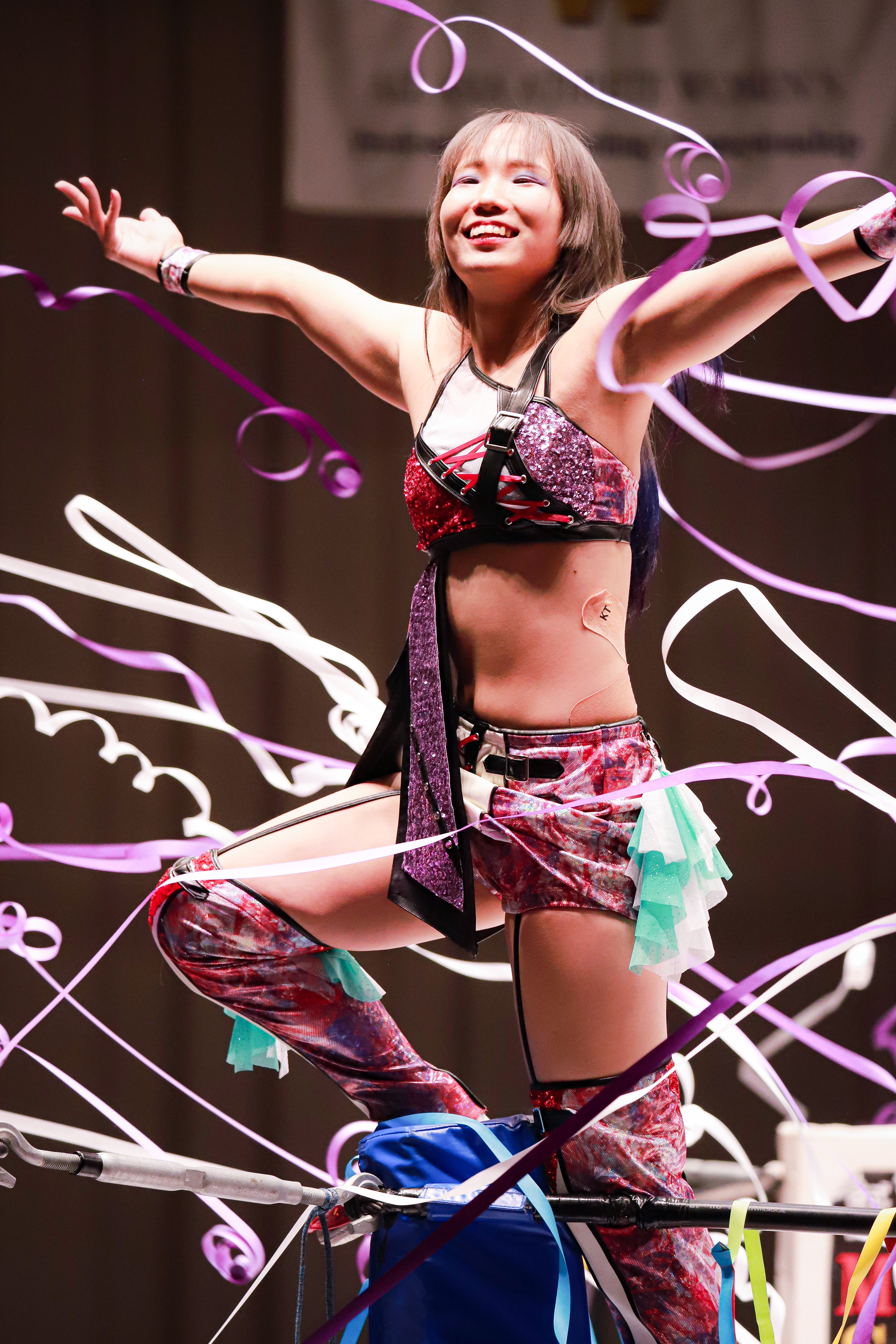
- Maria in July 2023

Personal information
- Born: March 1, 2000 (age 26) Adachi, Tokyo, Japan

Professional wrestling career
- Ring name: Maria
- Billed height: 163 cm (5 ft 4 in)
- Billed weight: 58 kg (128 lb)
- Trained by: Chigusa Nagayo
- Debut: 2018

Maria Takeda (竹田真里亜, Takeda Maria) mononymously known as Maria is a Japanese professional wrestler currently working for Marvelous That's Women Pro Wrestling. She is also known for her tenure with Pro Wrestling Wave. She also represents one-half of the Marvelous tag team Magenta with Riko Kawahata.

== Professional wrestling career ==
=== Marvelous That's Women Wrestling (2018–present) ===
Takeda made her professional wrestling debut on December 24, 2018, at Marvelous Are You Ready? where she fell short to Tsukasa Fujimoto.

=== Independent circuit (2019–present) ===
Beginning as a freelancer, Takeda is known for competing in multiple promotions of the Japanese independent scene. At Seadlinnng Shin-Kiba 21st NIGHT on December 6, 2019, she teamed up with fellow La Fersa de Egoistas stable member Mima Shimoda to defeat Takumi Iroha and Yoshiko. At New Ice Ribbon #1013 ~ RibbonMania 2019, an event promoted by Ice Ribbon on December 30, 2019, Kohgo competed in Tequila Saya's retirement 44-person gauntlet match which ended in a time-limit draw and also involved notable opponents such as Ken Ohka, Munenori Sawa, Manami Toyota, Ram Kaicho, Rina Shingaki, Matsuya Uno and many others. At Sendai Girls Road To GAEAism, an event promoted by Sendai Girls' Pro Wrestling on January 10, 2021, she competed in a 14-woman gauntlet tag team match in which she teamed up with Hibiki, Masha Slamovich, Mei Hoshizuki, Mikoto Shindo, Mio Momono and Rin Kadokura as "Team Mervelous" to defeat Team Sendai (Chihiro Hashimoto, Dash Chisako, Kanon, Manami, Mika Iwata, Natsuho Kaneko and Yurika Oka).

=== Pro Wrestling Wave (2019–2021) ===
Takeda also competed in Pro Wrestling Wave. She wrestled in one of the promotion's signature events, the 2019 edition of the Catch the Wave tournament, where she placed herself in the "Young Block", scoring a total of two points after going against Hiro'e, Haruka Umesaki and Ibuki Hoshi. At Kariya WAVE on December 5, 2021, Takeda fell short to Itsuki Aoki in a number one contender's tournament finals for the Wave Single Championship.

=== World Wonder Ring Stardom (2021–2022) ===
Due to World Wonder Ring Stardom's close relationships with Marvelous, Takeda had the chance to work in several events promoted by Stardom. She made her first appearance at Stardom 10th Anniversary Grand Final Osaka Dream Cinderella on October 9, 2021, where she teamed up with Rin Kadokura to defeat Cosmic Angels (Mina Shirakawa and Mai Sakurai). At Osaka Super Wars, the last event of the Stardom Super Wars trilogy which took place on December 18, 2021, she teamed up with Takumi Iroha and Rin Kadokura as "Team Marvelous" and fell short to MaiHimePoi (Maika, Himeka and Natsupoi) in a Six-woman tag team match for the Artist of Stardom Championship which was disputed as part of a ¥10 Million Unit Tournament semi-final match. At Stardom New Blood 1 on March 11, 2022, she teamed up with Ai Houzan to defeat Cosmic Angels (Unagi Sayaka and Waka Tsukiyama). On the second night of the Stardom World Climax 2022 from March 27, Maria competed in a 18-women Cinderella Rumble match won by Mei Suruga and also featuring various wrestlers who competed at New Blood 1 such as Haruka Umesaki, Nanami, Tomoka Inaba, Yuna Mizumori and others.

== Championships and accomplishments ==
- Dream Star Fighting Marigold
  - Marigold Twin Star Championship (1 time) – with Riko Kawahata
- Marvelous That's Women Pro Wrestling
  - AAAW Tag Team Championship (2 times) – with Riko Kawahata
- Pro Wrestling Wave
  - Catch the Wave Award
    - Fighting Spirit Award (2019) shared with Hamuko Hoshi and Haruka Umesaki
