= Chika Goto =

Japanese professional wrestler

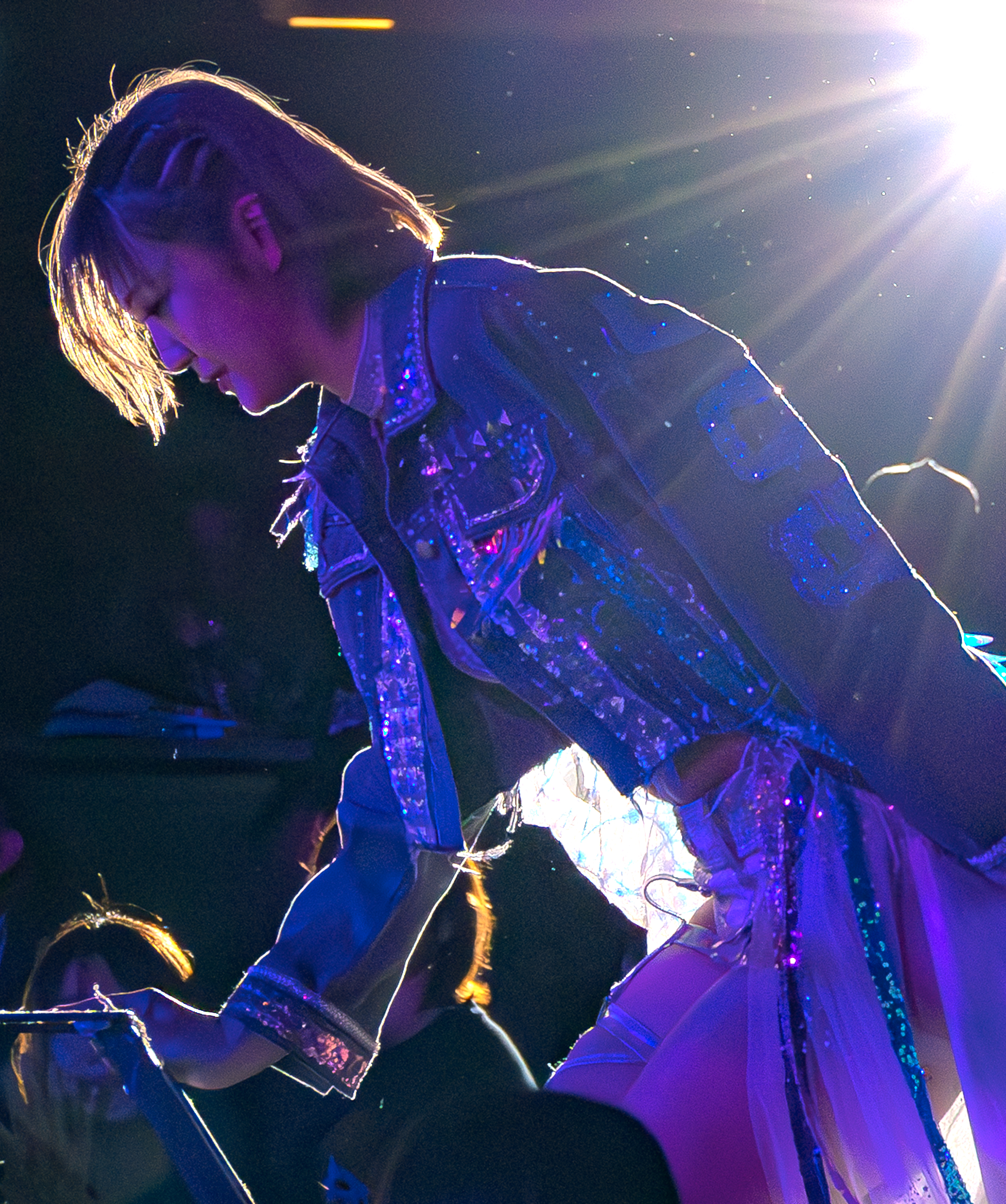
- Goto in April 2025

Personal information
- Born: 26 October 1994 (age 31) Tokyo, Japan

Professional wrestling career
- Ring name: Chika Goto
- Billed height: 173 cm (5 ft 8 in)
- Billed weight: 83 kg (183 lb)
- Debut: 2022

Chika Goto (後藤智香, Goto Chika) is a Japanese professional wrestler and gravure idol currently performing in the Japanese promotion Dream Star Fighting Marigold where she is one-half of the current Marigold Twin Star Champions in her first reign. She is previously known for her short tenure with Actwres girl'Z.

== Biography ==
Goto's family owns an Izakaya restaurant called "Umaissho Goto" located in Nishi-Oku, Arakawa, Tokyo.

After graduating from high school, Goto worked as a caregiver and wedding planner until the age of 22. She then she entered the world of theater and gravure, which she had been interested in for a long time. The turning point came in 2021, when she entered the 2022 "Miss Flash" bikini competition. She placed third in the first rounds and advanced to the semi-final stage. Goto succeeded in qualifying to the finals where she made it to the last fifteen contestants, stage of the competition in which Mai Sakurai was also competing. Although she was not selected as one of the three finalists, Goto was looking to take a step up when she was invited by her co-stars on stage and Keiji Sakaguchi, the company's representative to join Actwres girl'Z.

== Professional wrestling career ==
=== Actwres girl'Z (2022–2024) ===
Goto made her professional wrestling debut in Actwres girl'Z on August 12, 2022, at AWG ACTwrestling In Korakuen Hall where she teamed up with Nagisa Shiotsuki, Naho Yamada and Nene Arahata to defeat Allen, Asako Mia, Marino Saihara and Wild Bunny. She roughly competed in the promotion for one year and a half, wrestling her last match at AWG ACTwrestling Step 39 on April 14, 2024, where she unsuccessfully challenged Natsumi Sumikawa for the AWG Single Championship.

=== Dream Star Fighting Marigold (2024–present) ===
In April 2024, Goto was announced as part of the newly created promotion of Dream Star Fighting Marigold. At the inaugural event, the Marigold Fields Forever from May 20, she teamed up with Kouki Amarei to defeat Misa Matsui and Natsumi Showzuki. At Summer Destiny on July 13, she teamed up again with Amarei, with whom she was already wrestling under the tag name of "tWin toWer" to go into a time-limit draw against Kizuna Tanaka and Victoria Yuzuki. Goto and Amarei competed in the inaugural tournament for the Marigold Twin Star Championship in which they defeated Nanae Takahashi and Nao Ishikawa in the first rounds, then fell short to Miku Aono and Natsumi Showzuki in the second ones.

At Summer Gold Shine on August 19, Goto teamed up with Takahashi in a losing effort against Arisa Nakajima and Sareee. She competed in the "Dream League" Block of the Dream★Star GP where she wrestled against NØRI, Utami Hayashishita, Natsumi Showzuki, Mirai, Kouki Amarei, Nagisa Nozaki and Victoria Yuzuki.

== Championships and accomplishments ==
- Dream Star Fighting Marigold
  - Marigold Twin Star Championship (1 time, current) – with Kouki Amarei
  - Dream★Star GP Award (1 time)
    - Fighting Spirit Award (2025)
