= Riko Kawahata =

Japanese professional wrestler

Riko Kawahata 川畑梨瑚
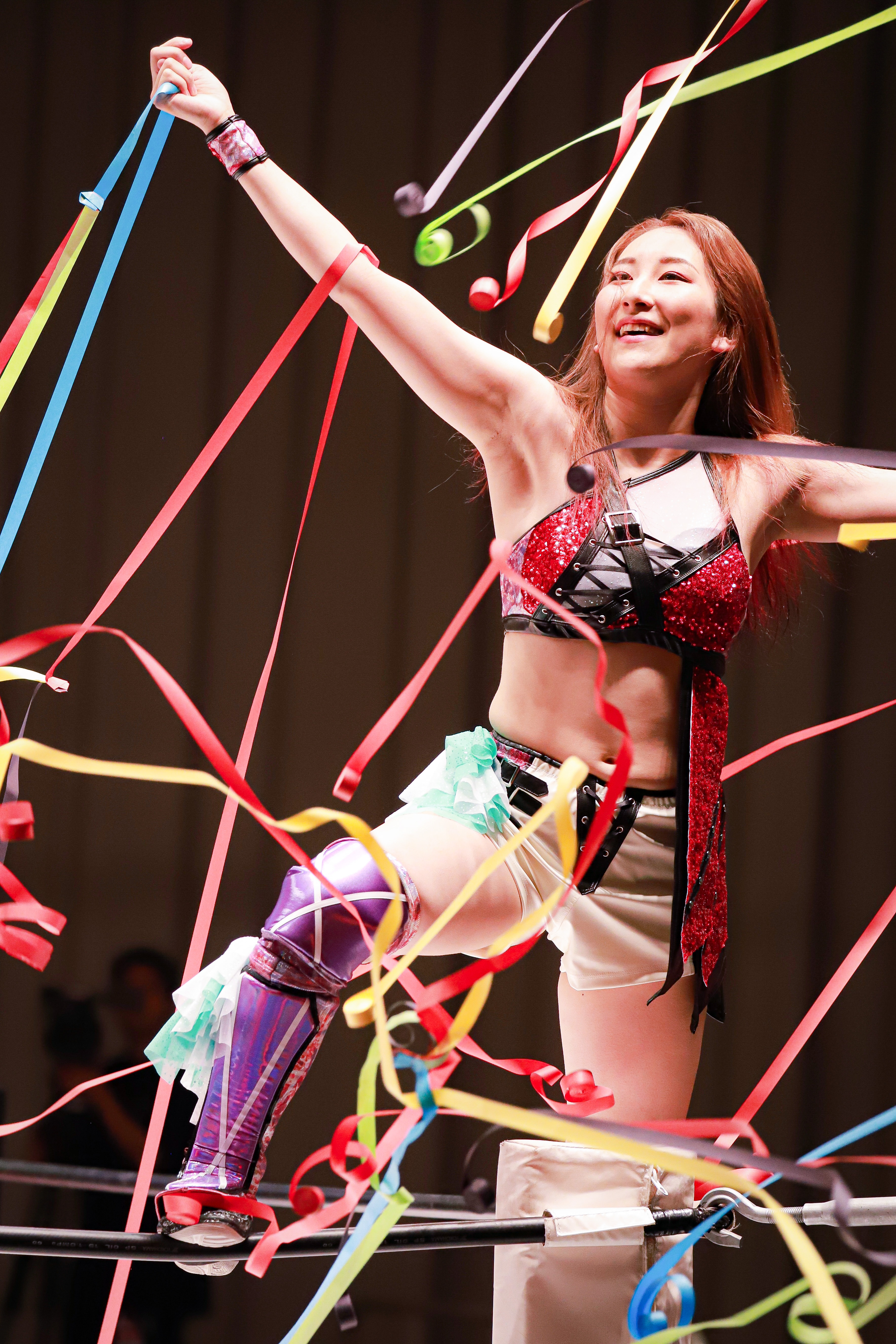
- Kawahata in August 2023

Personal information
- Born: July 28, 1999 (age 27) Tokyo, Japan

Professional wrestling career
- Ring names: Riko Kawahata; Great Sakuya
- Billed height: 160 cm (5 ft 3 in)
- Billed weight: 55 kg (121 lb)
- Trained by: Yumiko Hotta
- Debut: 2018

Riko Kawahata (川畑梨瑚, Kawahata Riko) is a Japanese professional wrestler currently competing in Marvelous That's Women Pro Wrestling. She and her tag team partner Maria are the current and two-time AAAW Tag Team Champions and former Twin Star Champions of Dream Star Fighting Marigold. She is also known for her tenure with Pro Wrestling Noah where she competes under the gimmick of Great Sakuya (愚零闘咲夜, Gureito Sakuya), as well as for various other stints with promotions from the Japanese independent scene such as Seadlinnng and Pro Wrestling Wave.

== Professional wrestling career ==
=== Actwres girl'Z (2018–2020) ===
Kawahata made her professional wrestling debut in Actwres girl'Z at AgZ Actwres girl'Z In Korakuen on November 15, 2018, where she fell short to Miku Aono in singles competition. In AWG, she was a member of T-Hearts. She participated in a number one contendership tournament for the AWG Single Championship in which she defeated Ayumi Hayashi in the semifinals and Misa Matsui in the finals from AWG Actwres girl'Z In Korakuen Hall on November 6, 2019, but never got to challenge for the championship. Kawahata often competed in AWG Color's, a branch of events promoted by AWG. At one of these events from January 19, 2020, she teamed up with Mii and unsuccessfully challenged Tropikawild (Saki and Yuna Mizumori) for the Asia Dream Tag Team Championship.

=== Marvelous That's Women Pro Wrestling (2020–present) ===
Kawahata made her first appearance in Marvelous at a house show from January 26, 2020, where she wrestled Mei Hoshizuki into a time-limit draw. At a house show from December 10, 2023, she teamed up with "Magenta" tag team partner Maria to defeat Chikayo Nagashima and Takumi Iroha for the AAAW Tag Team Championship.

=== Pro Wrestling Wave (2020–2023) ===
Another promotion with which Kawahata has shared a brief tenure was Pro Wrestling Wave. She made her first appearance at WAVE NAMI 1 on February 1, 2020, where she went into a time-limit draw against Maria. She competed in one of the promotion's signature events, the Catch the Wave tournament in which she made her first appearance at the 2022 edition where she has fought in the "Future Block", scoring a total of four points after going against Suzu Suzuki, Haruka Umesaki, Kohaku and Chie Ozora. One year later at the 2023 edition, Kawahata placed herself in the Block B where she scored a total of two points after competing against Saki, Risa Sera, Miyuki Takase and Kakeru Sekiguchi.

Kawahata competed for a couple of accomplishments put at stake by Wave. At WAVE Survival Dance ~ Regina Challenge on October 24, 2022, Kawahata wrestled in a number one contendership battle royal for the Wave Single Championship won by Yuki Miyazaki and also involving various other notable opponents such as Akane Fujita, Sae, Miyako Matsumoto, Tsubasa Kuragaki, Sakura Hirota, Momo Tani and many others. At WAVE PHASE 2 Reboot 3rd ~ NAMI 1 on February 1, 2023, Kawahata teamed up with Kakeru Sekiguchi to unsuccessfully challenge galaxyPunch! (Hikari Shimizu and Saki) for the Wave Tag Team Championship.

Kawahata competed at DDT Pro-Wrestling's Never Mind 2022 event where she teamed up with Saori Anou in a losing effort against Reiwa Ban AA Cannon (Saki Akai and Yuki Arai).

=== Seadlinnng (2021–2023) ===
Another promotion with which Kawahata has shared a compact tenure was Seadlinnng. She made her first appearance at SEAdLINNNG New Leaf 2021 on February 26, where she teamed up with Arisa Nakajima and Nanae Takahashi to defear Las Fresa de Egoistas (Asuka and Makoto) and Tsukushi Haruka. At SEAdLINNNG Grow Together! 2021 on March 17, Kawahata teamed up with Honori Hana as "Citrus Wind" and won the one-night Get A Dream Tournament by defeating Chikayo Nagashima and Tsukushi Haruka in the finals. This win granted Kawahata and Hana the number one contendership for the Beyond the Sea Tag Team Championship which they unsuccessfully challenged for at SEAdLINNNG Special NIGHT! on April 26, 2021, by falling short to reigning champions and Citrus Wind stablemates Arisa nakajima and Nanae Takahashi. At SEAdLINNNG Vibrant February on February 16, 2023, she unsuccessfully challenged Nakajima for the Beyond the Sea Single Championship.

=== Pro Wrestling Noah (2023–present) ===
Kawahata made her debut appearance in Pro Wrestling Noah at NOAH Monday Magic #1 on October 9, 2023, where she teamed up with Yuu in a losing effort against Mio Momono and Takumi Iroha. In late November 2023, Kawahata appeared under the gimmick of "Great Sakuya", the kayfabe daughter of The Great Muta. She wrestled her first match under this gimmick at Noah The New Year 2024 on January 1, where she teamed up with Nagisa Nozaki in a losing effort against Luminous (Haruka Umesaki and Miyuki Takase).

== Championships and accomplishments ==
- Actwres girl'Z
  - AWG Title #1 Contendership Tournament (2019)
- Dream Star Fighting Marigold
  - Marigold Twin Star Championship (1 time) – with Maria
- Marvelous That's Women Pro Wrestling
  - AAAW Tag Team Championship (2 times) – with Maria
- Pro Wrestling Illustrated
  - Ranked No. 239 of the top 250 female wrestlers in the PWI Women's 250 in 2024
- Seadlinnng
  - Get A Dream Tournament (2021) – with Honori Hana
