= Natsumi Showzuki =

Japanese professional wrestler

Natsumi Sumikawa
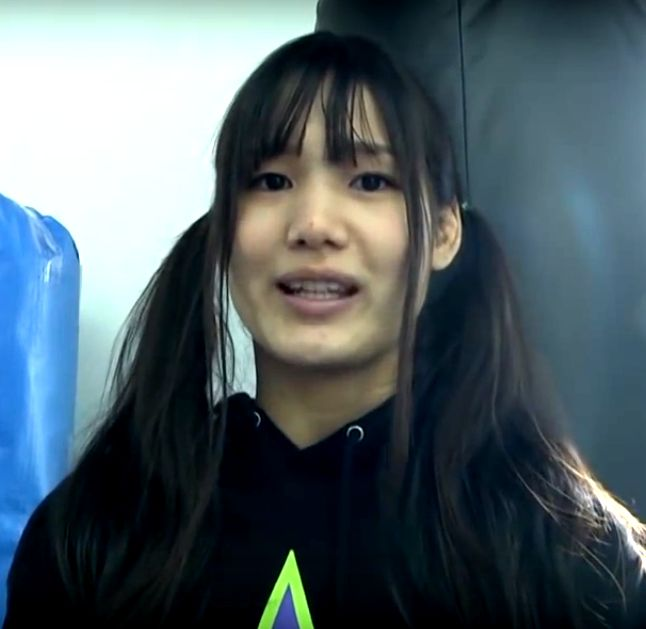
- Sumikawa in March 2018

Personal information
- Born: February 25, 1989 (age 37) Amagasaki, Japan
- Family: Hiroki Tokoda (cousin)

Professional wrestling career
- Ring names: Natsumi Showzuki; Natsumi Sumikawa
- Billed height: 158 cm (5 ft 2 in)
- Billed weight: 50 kg (110 lb)
- Trained by: Fuka
- Debut: 2012

Natsumi Tokoda (床田夏美, Tokoda Natsumi) better known by her ring name Natsumi Showzuki (翔月なつみ, Shōzuki Natsumi), and previously known as Natsumi Sumikawa (澄川菜摘, Sumikawa Natsumi), is a Japanese professional wrestler signed to Dream Star Fighting Marigold, where she was is a former Marigold Super Fly Champion.

Sumikawa is also known for her tenure with World Wonder Ring Stardom where she is a former Goddesses of Stardom Champion and Actwres girl'Z where she is a former AWG Single Champion.

== Professional wrestling career ==
=== World Wonder Ring Stardom (2012–2013) ===
Tokoda is best known for her two-year tenure with World Wonder Ring Stardom. She made her professional wrestling debut in the promotion under the ring name of "Natsumi Showzuki" on the second night of the Stardom Season 5 New Year Stars 2012 from January 22, where she fell short to Io Shirai in singles competition.

During her short stint with the promotion, she competed in a couple of its signature events. As for the Stardom Rookie of the Year tournament, she made her only appearance at the 2012 edition where she fell short to Act Yasukawa in the first rounds. In the Goddesses of Stardom Tag League, Showzuki made her only appearance at the 2012 edition where she teamed up with Kairi Hojo as "Ho-Show Tennyo" and topped the A Block of the competition with a toal of four points after going against the teams of Miho Wakizawa and Nanae Takahashi, Christina Von Eerie and Kyoko Kimura, and Act Yasukawa and Saki Kashima. They fell short to Natsuki Taiyo and Yoshiko in the finals. At Stardom Ryogoku Cinderella Champions Fiesta on April 29, 2013, Tokoda and Hojo defeated Kimura Monster-gun (Hailey Hatred and Kyoko Kimura) to win the Goddesses of Stardom Championship, titles which they dropped 34 days later due to Sumikawa getting sidelined with a cervical spine injury.

Tokoda teamed up with Mayu Iwatani and Io Shirai and competed in the inaugural tournament of the Artist of Stardom Championship, where they fell short to Team Shimmer (Kellie Skater, Portia Perez and Tomoka Nakagawa) in the semifinals.

Tokoda retired from in-ring competition on July 31, 2013, due to complications from her cervical spine injury.

=== Actwres girl'Z (2021–2024) ===
After an eight-year hiatus from professional wrestling, Tokoda made her in-ring return at AWG Act 55 on November 6, 2021, where she defeated Naru in singles competition. At AWG ACTwrestling in Korakuen Hall on March 24, 2024, Sumikawa won the AWG Single Championship after defeating Mari.

=== All Japan Pro Wrestling (2024) ===
Tokoda started competing for All Japan Pro Wrestling as developmental talent sent by Actwres girl'Z. She made her debut on the first night of the AJPW New Year Giant Series 2024 from January 2, where she teamed up with Misa Matsui and defeated Miku Aono and Yui Tenshoku. On the first night of the AJPW Excite Series 2024 from February 20, she teamed up with Miku Aono to defeat Kouki and Naru in tag team competition.

=== Dream Star Fighting Marigold (2024–present) ===
In April 2024, Tokoda was announced as part of the newly created promotion of Dream Star Fighting Marigold and participated in their inaugural event, the Marigold Fields Forever from May 20, 2024, where she teamed up with Misa Matsui in a losing effort against Chika Goto and Amarei Kouki. On July 13, at Summer Destiny, Showzuki defeated Misa Matsui in the finals of a four-woman single-elimination tournament to become the inaugural Marigold Super Fly Champion. On January 3, 2025, at First Dream, Showzuki dropped the title to Victoria Yuzuki, ending her reign at 174 days.

== Championships and accomplishments ==
- Actwres girl'Z
  - AWG Single Championship (1 time)
- Dream Star Fighting Marigold
  - Marigold Super Fly Championship (1 time, inaugural)
  - Marigold 3D Trios Championship (1 time, inaugural) – with Mai Sakurai and Erina Yamanaka
- Pro Wrestling Illustrated
  - Ranked No. 57 of the top 250 female wrestlers in the PWI Women's 250 in 2024
- World Wonder Ring Stardom
  - Goddesses of Stardom Championship (1 time) – with Kairi Hojo
