= Seri Yamaoka =

Japanese professional wrestler

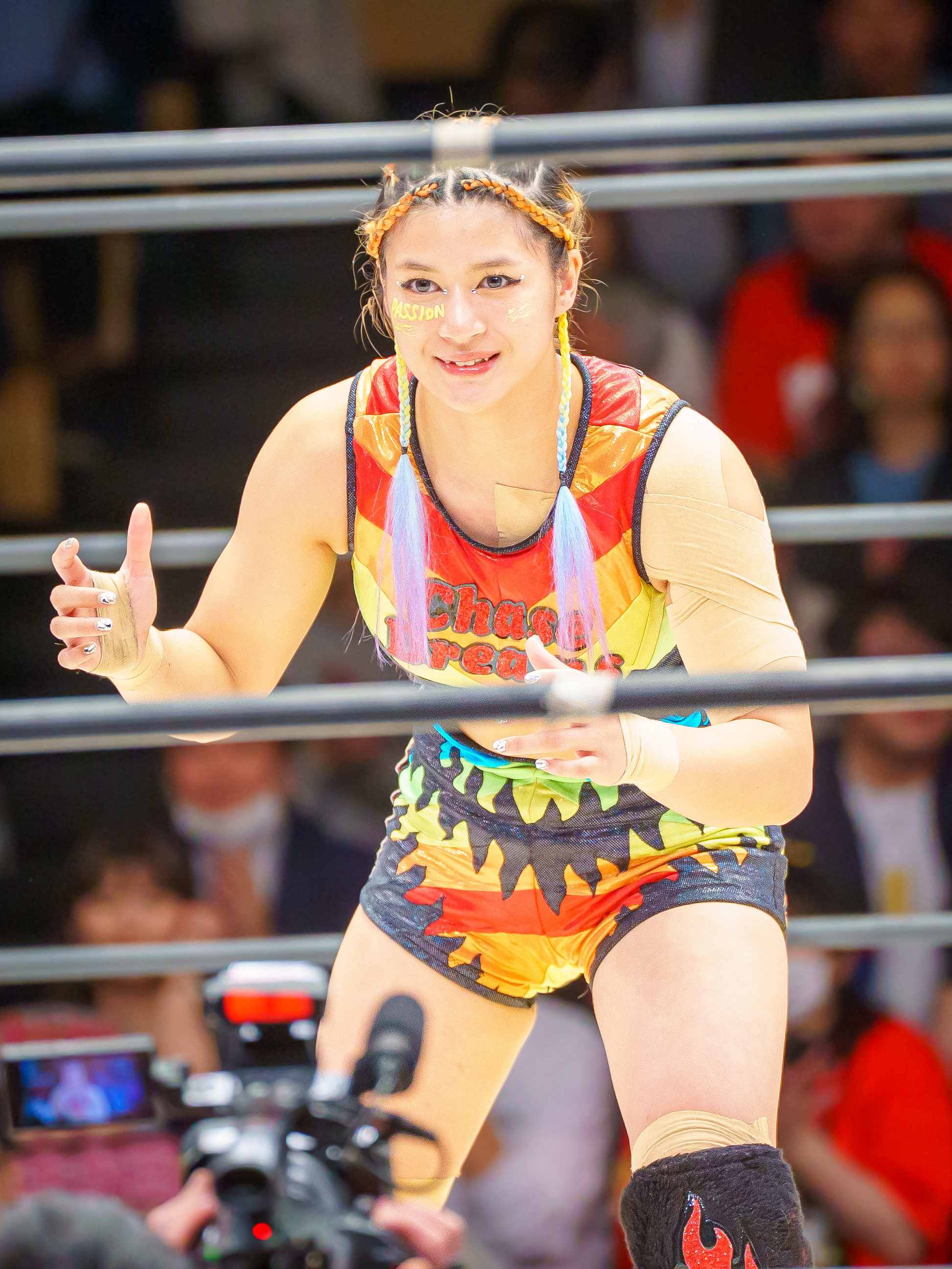
- Yamaoka in August 2025

Personal information
- Born: November 13, 2006 (age 19) Fukuoka Prefecture, Japan

Professional wrestling career
- Ring name: Seri Yamaoka
- Billed height: 162 cm (5 ft 4 in)
- Billed weight: 54 kg (119 lb)
- Trained by: Fuka Kakimoto; Nanae Takahashi; Mirai Maiumi
- Debut: 2025

Seri Yamada (山田セリ, Yamada Seri) better known by her ring name Seri Yamaoka (山岡聖怜, Yamaoka Seri) (born November 13, 2006) is a Japanese professional wrestler and former amateur wrestler currently signed to the Japanese promotion Dream Star Fighting Marigold where she is a former Marigold Twin Star Champion alongside Nanae Takahashi.

== Professional wrestling career ==
=== Dream Star Fighting Marigold (2024–present) ===
On August 17, 2024, it was announced that Yamaoka joined Dream Star Fighting Marigold as a trainee and that she would make her in-ring debut on January 3, 2025. On December 10, it was decided that Mirai would serve as opponent in Yamaoka's debut match.

Yamaoka made her unofficial debut while taking part in Giulia's last match before her departure from Marigold, a gauntlet match which took place at Summer Gold Shine on August 25, 2024, where Yamaoka alongside Shinno Omukai and Ryoko Sakimura faced Giulia for one minute into a time-limit draw.

Yamaoka made her official in-ring debut at Marigold First Dream on January 3, 2025, where she faced Mirai initially into a time-limit draw, then fell short to the latter after the match briefly restarted. After the match, Yamaoka announced that she would team up with Nanae Takahashi to challenge Bozilla and Tank for the Marigold Twin Star Championship on the first night of the New Year's Golden Garden on January 19, 2025. In the event, Takahashi and Yamaoka defeated Bozilla and Tank to win the title.

On February 20, 2025, Takahashi and Yamaoka defeated Utami Hayashishita and Victoria Yuzuki to secure the first defense of the Marigold Twin Star Championship.

== Championships and accomplishments ==
- British Empire Wrestling
  - British Empire Women's World Championship (1 time)
- Dream Star Fighting Marigold
  - Marigold Twin Star Championship (1 time) – with Nanae Takahashi
  - Twin Star Cup (2025) - with Shinno
  - Rookie of the Year (2025)
  - Marigold Year-End Award (1 time)
    - SHINE Award (2025)
- Pro Wrestling Illustrated
  - Ranked No. 156 of the top 250 female wrestlers in the PWI Women's 250 in 2025
- Wrestling Observer Newsletter
  - Rookie of the Year (2025)
