= Nanae Takahashi =

Japanese professional wrestler (born 1978)

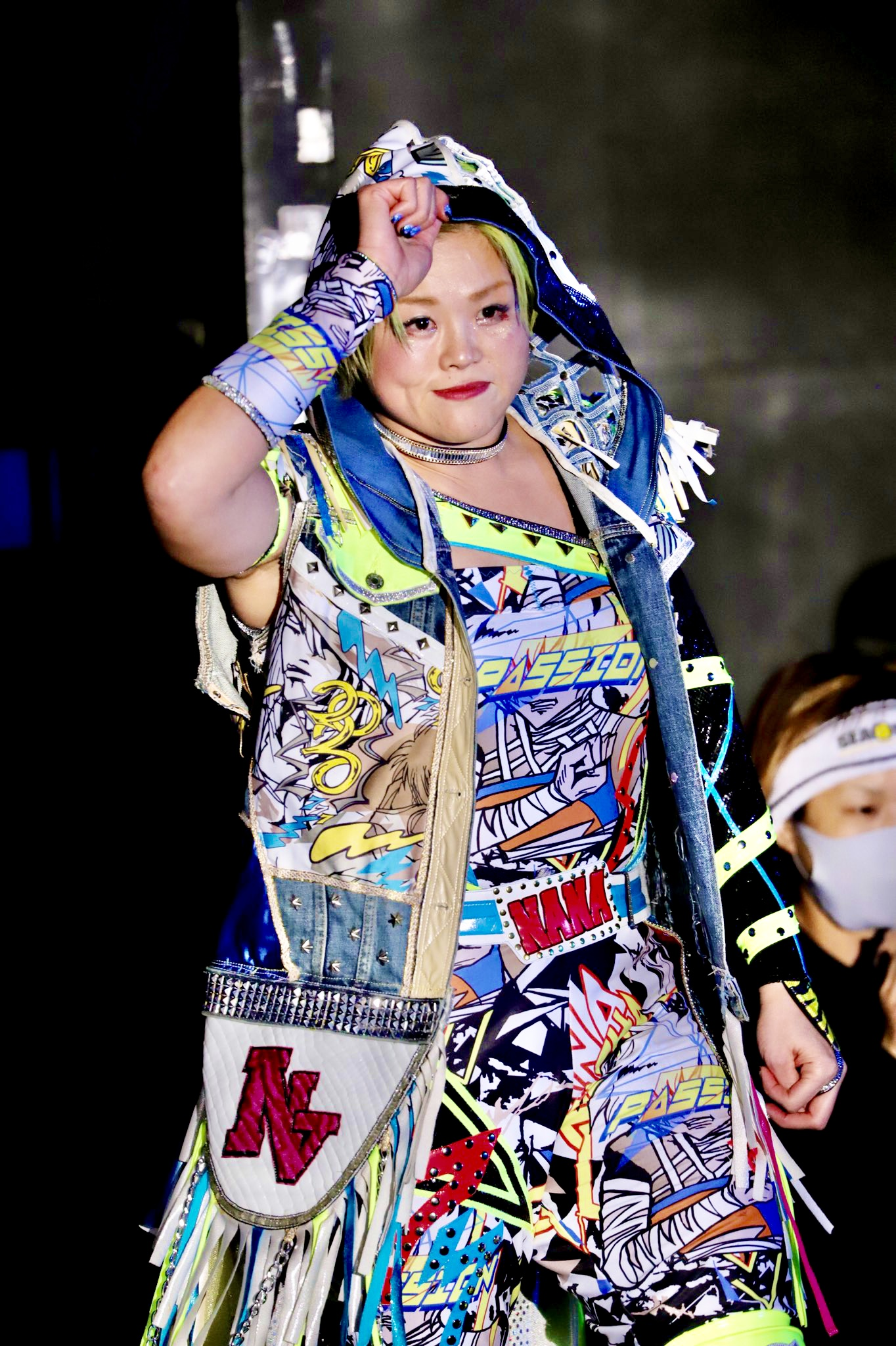
- Takahashi in December 2020.

Personal information
- Born: Nanae Takahashi; December 23, 1978 (age 47) Kawaguchi, Saitama

Professional wrestling career
- Ring name(s): Nanae Takahashi; Passion Seven
- Billed height: 1.68 m (5 ft 6 in)
- Billed weight: 65 kg (143 lb)
- Trained by: All Japan Women's Pro-Wrestling (AJW); Animal Hamaguchi
- Debut: July 14, 1996
- Retired: May 24, 2025

Nanae Takahashi (高橋 奈苗, Takahashi Nanae; ring name: 高橋奈七永) (born December 23, 1978) is a retired Japanese professional wrestler, founder of Seadlinnng and co-founder of World Wonder Ring Stardom. She was signed to Dream Star Fighting Marigold, where she held her final match at Marigold Shine Forever. She has wrestled for prominent Japanese promotions All Japan Women's Pro-Wrestling and Pro Wrestling Sun, and is a two-time women's world champion in major professional wrestling promotions.

== Professional wrestling career ==
=== Freelancing (1996-2025) ===
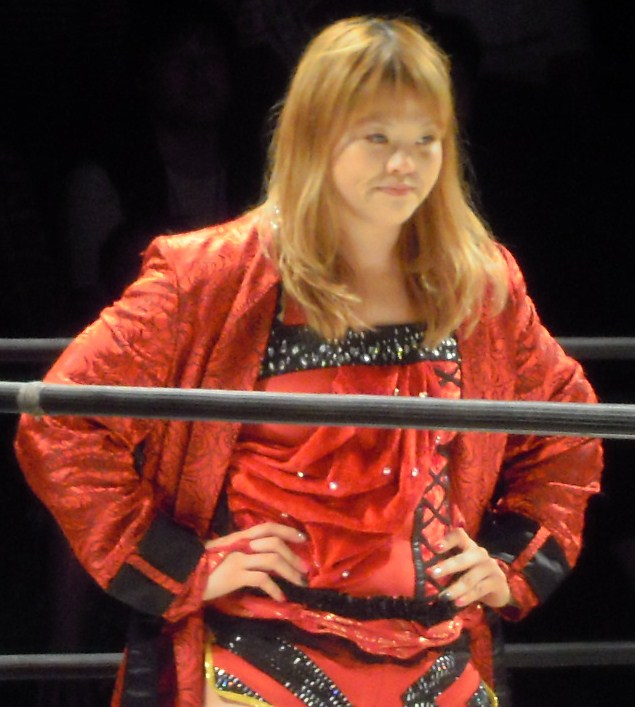
Takahashi in May 2011.

Nanae Takahashi graduated from All Japan Women's Pro-Wrestling's (AJW) training class of 1996, and rose to prominence at a time when AJW was beginning its decline. Early on, she achieved the most fame as part of the tag team Nanamomo with classmate Momoe Nakanishi. Together, Nanamomo won four tag team championships, the AJW Tag Team Championship twice (on November 23, 1997 and August 23, 1998) and the WWWA World Tag Team Championship twice (on July 16, 2000, and July 6, 2002). Concurrently, Takahashi was making a name for herself as a singles competitor, winning the AJW Championship on March 1, 2000, and the junior division competition at that year's Japan Grand Prix. Having established herself as a major competitor, Takahashi won the 2002 Japan Grand Prix, and won her first WWWA World Single Championship on December 12, 2004. During AJW's final years she won the WWWA World Tag Team Championship three more times (each time with a different partner), and the WWWA World Single Championship once more. She was the last WWWA champion, handing over the belt to promoter Takashi Matsunaga immediately after winning it on March 26, 2006.

At an independent show held on July 14, 2006 to celebrate her tenth anniversary in professional wrestling, Takahashi announced her intention to start her own promotion. Her stable, the Dream Catchers, held their final show on the following September 3.

On October 1, 2006, Takahashi defeated Africa 55 for the resurrected AWA World Women's Championship at the debut of her new promotion, Pro Wrestling Sun. The promotion was a sister promotion to Pro Wrestling Zero1-Max, and at the time an affiliate of the revived American Wrestling Association. On January 14, 2007, Takahashi lost her world championship to Amazing Kong, but regained it again on May 13 of the same year, in Los Angeles, California. She became recognized as the first AWA Japan Women's Champion on June 19, 2007, after the AWA World Women's title was retired out of respect for four-time former champion Sherri Martel, who had died on June 15.

After Sun closed on March 3, 2008, Takahashi formed a unit called "Passion Red" with Natsuki☆Taiyo and Kana. They were active mainly with NEO Japan Ladies' Pro Wrestling.

On October 4, 2008, Takahashi beat Kyoko Inoue to win NWA Women's Pacific/NEO Single Championship. On October 10, 2009, she won NEO Tag Team Championship with Kana.

From January 25, 2009 to December 29, 2010, Takahashi was also active with Ice Ribbon and held International Ribbon Tag Team Championship three times (with Minori Makiba, Kazumi Shimouma and Emi Sakura) and Triangle Ribbon Championship once.

On April 18, 2010, Takahashi beat Kayoko Haruyama to win JWP Openweight Championship. She became the second champion from outside since Manami Toyota in 2006.

On December 15, 2010, Takahashi won Women's Award of Tokyo Sports.

On June 12, 2015, Takahashi announced she was going to start promoting her own professional wrestling events with her new production company, "Seadlinnng". On July 17, Takahashi returned to the United States, making her debut for Ring of Honor (ROH) in Las Vegas, Nevada by defeating ODB. Seadlinnng held its first show on August 26, 2015.

On January 7, 2018, Takahashi was legitimately injured in a Hardcore Tag Team Match, while teaming up with Yoshiko against Rina Yamashita & Ryo Mizunami at WAVE Happy New Year 2018. While attempting a move from the top of a ladder, the ladder tilted and fell, causing her to fall and land on her head, legitimately knocking her unconscious. The referee ended the match, and she was taken out on a stretcher.

=== World Wonder Ring Stardom (2010–2024) ===
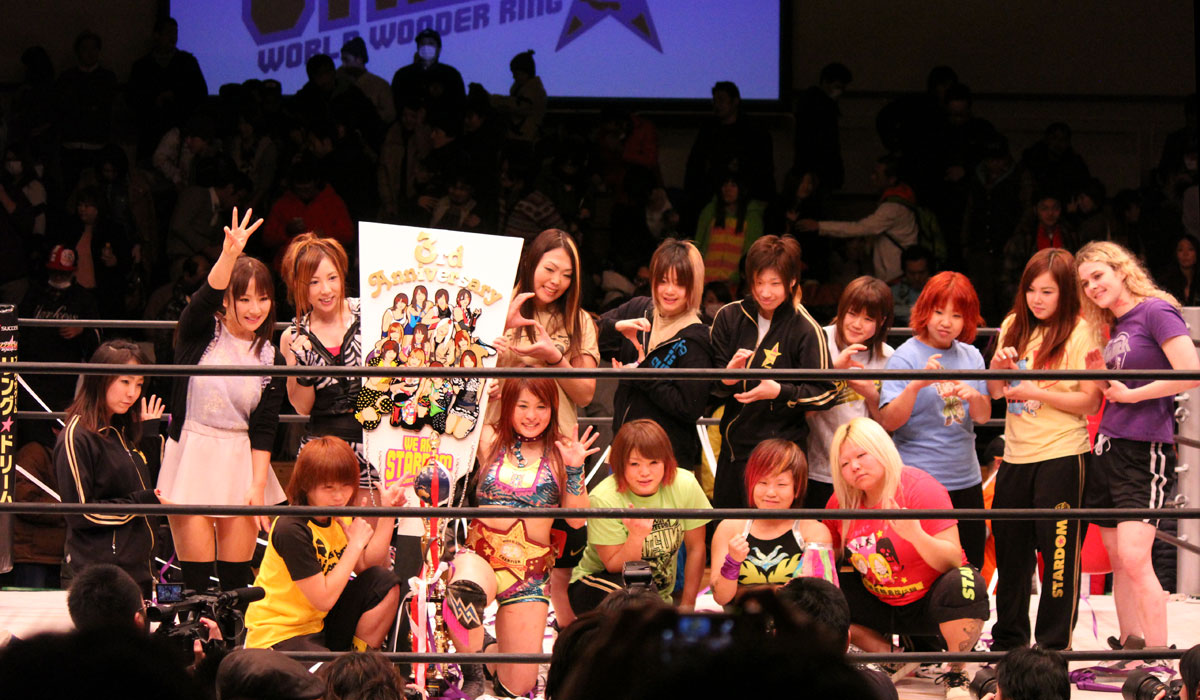
Takahashi (the third from the left on the bottom row) alongside various wrestlers from the 2014 incarnation of Stardom's roster.

On September 7, 2010, Takahashi announced with Fuka and Rossy Ogawa that they founded a new promotion called World Wonder Ring Stardom. They had their first card on January 23, 2011. On July 24, 2011, Takahashi became the inaugural World of Stardom Champion by defeating Yoko Bito in the finals of a four-woman tournament. On March 17, 2013, Takahashi lost the World of Stardom Championship to Alpha Female. On May 12, 2015, Takahashi, in an interview with Tokyo Sports, announced she was leaving Stardom and continuing her career as a freelancer.

Takahashi returned to Stardom on December 26, 2020 at Year-End Climax 2020. On March 3, 2021, Takahashi defeated Momo Watanabe at Stardom All Star Dream Cinderella.

Takahashi made another return to the company at Mid Summer Champions in Tokyo, the first event of the Stardom Mid Summer Champions series which took place on July 9, 2022, after Saya Kamitani retained the Wonder of Stardom Championship against Starlight Kid. Takahashi then announced she was the self-proclaimed tag partner of Kairi and she challenged both Kamitani and Lady C to a match. On the first night of the Stardom 5 Star Grand Prix 2022 from July 30, she and Kairi defeated Queen's Quest's Saya Kamitani and Lady C. Takahashi concluded a short-term feud with Syuri at Stardom x Stardom: Nagoya Midsummer Encounter on August 21, 2022, where she unsuccessfully challenged the God's Eye stable leader for the World of Stardom Championship, title which she primordially held. At Stardom in Showcase vol.2, a non-canon event produced on September 25, 2022, Rossy Ogawa was a victim of various "grim reaper masked silhouettes" who kept attacking him. For the event, he established Utami Hayashishita, Lady C and Syuri as his bodyguards. On the other corner, Yuu who was the first silhouette and unmasked at the previous Showcase event has also established two tag partners presented under the same masks. They were revealed to be Takahashi and Yuna Manase on the event's night as they succeeded in defeating Rossy's Bodyguard Army. Minutes later, a video of Alpha Female was played, showing her criticizing the current situation in Stardom as she was announcing her return to the company on October 23, 2022 for the IWGP Women's Championship tournament. Together with Takahashi, Manase and Yuu, Alpha Female officially formed the "Neo Stardom Army" unit and declared the destruction over Stardom's roster. At the 2022 Goddesses of Stardom Tag League, Takahashi teamed up with Yuu as "7Upp" and won the whole tournament by winning the "Blue Goddess Block" with a total of eleven points scored after competing against the teams of FWC (Hazuki and Koguma), MaiHime (Maika and Himeka), The New Eras (Mirai and Ami Sourei), BMI2000 (Natsuko Tora and Ruaka), 02 line (AZM and Miyu Amasaki), Kawild Venus (Mina Shirakawa/Waka Tsukiyama and Saki), and wing★gori (Hanan and Saya Iida). Yuu and Takahashi defeated Utami Hayashishita and Saya Kamitani in the finals.

=== Dream Star Fighting Marigold (2024–2025) ===
On April 15, 2024, Rossy Ogawa held a press conference to announce his new promotion Dream Star Fighting Marigold, with Takahashi being one of the initial roster members. On May 20, 2024, Takahashi, along with Victoria Yuzuki, participated in Marigold's very first match at Marigold Fields Forever, with Takahashi defeating Yuzuki. On December 13, 2024, after unsuccessfully challenging Sareee for the Marigold World Championship at Winter Wonderful Fight, Takahashi announced that she would be retiring from professional wrestling in May 2025.

On January 19, 2025, Takahashi and Seri Yamaoka defeated Bozilla and Tank to win the Twin Star Championship, the last championship of Takahashi's career and the first of Yamaoka's. On May 4, 2025, Takahashi wrestled Mayu Iwatani in Iwatani's first match in Marigold. On May 10, Takahashi and Yamaoka lost the Twin Star Championship to Maria and Riko Kawahata. On May 24, Takahashi lost her retirement match to Miku Aono at Shine Forever. After the match, Takahashi would wrestle a short Gauntlet match against Senka Akatsuki, Seri Yamaoka, Kouki Amarei, Yumiko Hotta and her former tag team partner Momoe Nakanishi.

== Championships and accomplishments ==
- All Japan Women's Pro-Wrestling

- AJW Championship (1 time)
- AJW Tag Team Championship (2 times) – with Momoe Nakanishi
- WWWA World Single Championship (2 times)
- WWWA World Tag Team Championship (5 times) – with Momoe Nakanishi (2), Tomoko Watanabe (1), Etsuko Mita (1), and Ayako Hamada (1)
- 21st Century League (2000)
- Japan Grand Prix (2002)
- Tag League the Best (1998) – with Momoe Nakanishi
- Tag League the Best (2003) – with Ayako Hamada

- AWA Superstars of Wrestling

- AWA World Women's Championship (3 times)

- Dream Star Fighting Marigold

- Marigold Twin Star Championship (1 time) – with Seri Yamaoka
- Dream★Star GP Award (1 time)
  - Star League Best Match Award (2024) vs. Sareee on September 23
- Marigold Year-End Award (1 time)
  - Best Match Award (2024) vs. Sareee on December 13

- Ice Ribbon

- International Ribbon Tag Team Championship (3 times) – with Minori Makiba (1), Kazumi Shimouma (1) and Emi Sakura (1)
- Triangle Ribbon Championship (1 time)
- Sakurasaku Tag Tournament '09 (2009) – with Minori Makiba

- JWP Joshi Puroresu
  - JWP Openweight Championship (1 time)
  - Discover New Heroine Tag Tournament Best Match Award (2007) with Natsuki☆Taiyo vs. Arisa Nakajima and Azumi Hyuga on April 15
  - JWP Year End-Award (1 time)
    - Best Bout Award (2007) with Natsuki☆Taiyo vs. Kayoko Haruyama and Tsubasa Kuragaki on December 9
- JDStar

- BSJ Queen of the Ring (1 time)

- NEO Japan Ladies Pro-Wrestling

- NEO Single Championship (1 time)
- NEO Tag Team Championship (1 time) – with Kana
- NWA Women's Pacific Championship (1 time)
- Mid Summer Tag Tournament VIII (2009) – with Emi Sakura

- Nikkan Sports

- Joshi Puroresu Best Bout Award (2010) vs. Fuka on March 28
- Joshi Puroresu MVP Award (2010)

- Pro Wrestling Illustrated
  - Ranked No. 105 of the top 150 female wrestlers in the PWI Women's 150 in 2022
- Pro Wrestling Zero1-Max

- AWA Japan Women's Championship (1 time)
- Blast Queen Championship (1 time)

- Seadlinnng
  - Beyond the Sea Single Championship (1 time)
  - Beyond the Sea Tag Team Championship (1 time) - with Arisa Nakajima
- Tokyo Sports

- Joshi Puroresu Grand Prize (2010)

- World Wonder Ring Stardom
  - Goddesses of Stardom Championship (3 times) – with Miho Wakizawa (1), Kairi Hojo (1) and Yuu (1)
  - World of Stardom Championship (1 time)
  - Goddesses of Stardom Championship Tournament (2013) – with Miho Wakizawa
  - Goddesses of Stardom Tag League – with Kairi Hojo (2014) and Yuu (2022)
  - Unit Opposition Tournament (2012) – with Miho Wakizawa and Yuuri Haruka
  - 5★Star GP (2013)
  - 5★Star GP Award (3 times)
    - 5★Star GP Best Bout Award (2013) vs. Natsuki☆Taiyo on September 23
    - 5★Star GP Best Match Award (2012) vs. Yuzuki Aikawa on September 17
    - 5★Star GP Best Match Award (2014) vs. Kairi Hojo on August 24
  - Stardom Year-End Award (6 times)
    - Best Bout Award (2011) vs. Natsuki☆Taiyo on November 12
    - Best Bout Award (2012) vs. Yuzuki Aikawa on September 17 and December 24
    - Best Match Award (2014) with Kairi Hojo vs. Risa Sera and Takumi Iroha on December 23
    - Best Tag Team Award (2013) with Miho Wakizawa
    - Best Tag Team Award (2014) with Kairi Hojo
    - MVP Award (2012)

== Luchas de Apuestas record ==
Winner (wager)	Loser (wager)	Location	Event	Date	Notes
Arisa Nakajima (hair and championship)	Nanae Takahashi (hair)	Kawasaki, Kanagawa, Japan	Dynamic Show Case! ~ Kawasaki Monogatari	November 2, 2019	

== Lethwei record ==
Lethwei record
1 fights, 0 wins, 0 loss, 1 draw
Date	Result	Opponent	Event	Location	Method	Round	Time
2017-06-16	Draw	(Japan) Vero Nika	Lethwei in Japan 4: Frontier	Tokyo, Japan	Draw	3	3:00
Legend: Win Loss Draw/No contest Notes
