= Nao Ishikawa =

Japanese professional wrestler

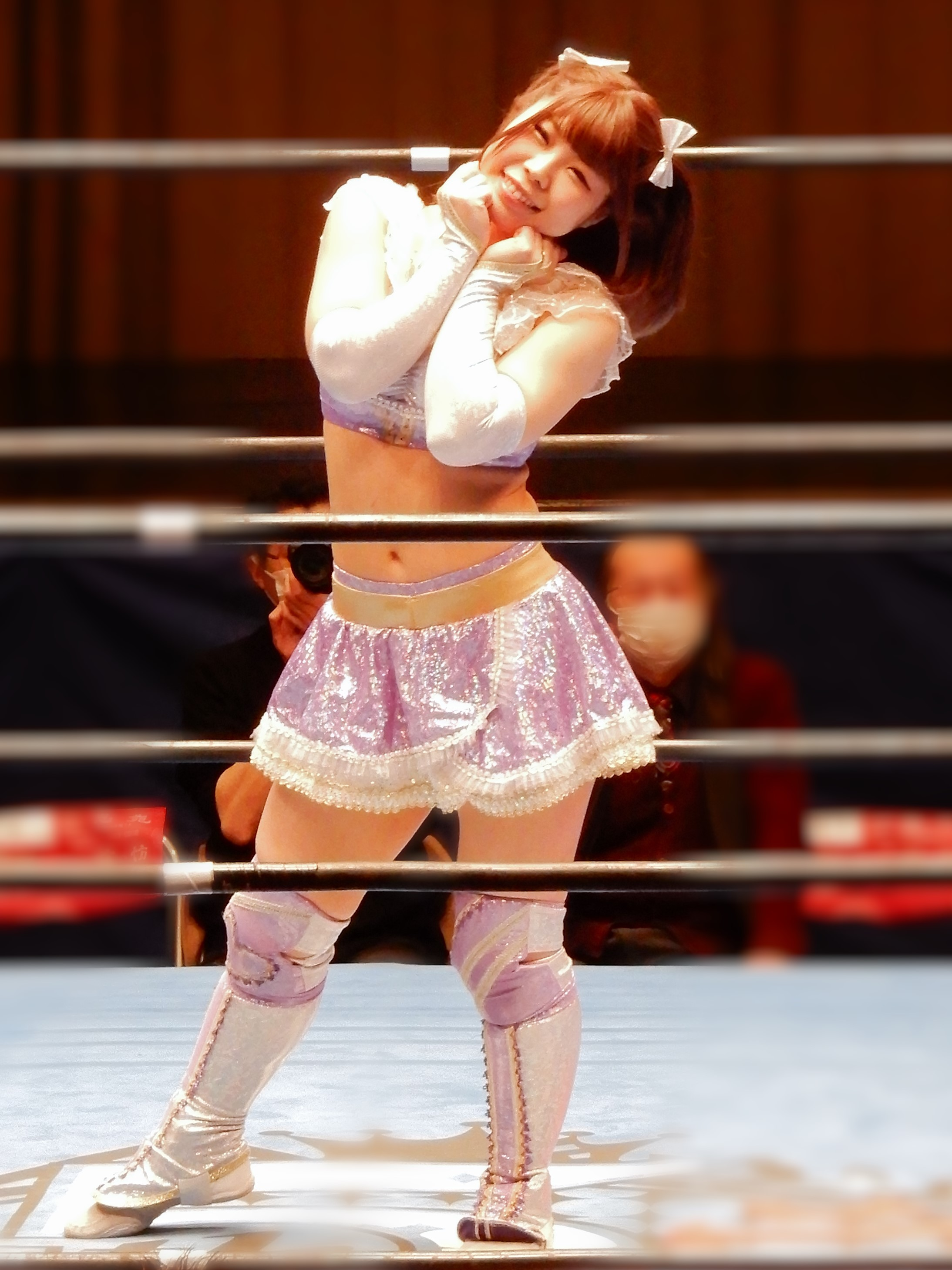
- Ishikawa in February 2022

Personal information
- Born: 27 May 1994 (age 32) Hakusan, Japan

Professional wrestling career
- Ring name: Nao Ishikawa
- Billed height: 158 cm (5 ft 2 in)
- Billed weight: 56 kg (123 lb)
- Trained by: Mio Shirai; Tsukushi
- Debut: 2019

Nao Ishikawa (石川奈青, Ishikawa Nao) is a Japanese professional wrestler, currently signed to Dream Star Fighting Marigold. She is previously known for her tenure with Ice Ribbon.

== Professional wrestling career ==
=== Ice Ribbon (2020–2023) ===
Ishikawa made her professional wrestling debut in Ice Ribbon. She underwent a debut twelve-exhibition match series which either ended up in time-limit draws or in losses. She wrestled the first two bouts of this kind at Ice Ribbon New Ice Ribbon #976 ~ Ueno Ribbon #1 on August 14, 2019, where she went into a draw against Suzu Suzuki and Matsuya Uno in separate bouts. She soon moved to bigger matches as she competed at the 2019 RibbonMania on December 31, where she wrestled in a 44-person gauntlet match in which the retiring Tequila Saya went into a draw with her, Risa Sera, Hiragi Kurumi, Manami Toyota, Ken Ohka, Tae Honma, Tsukasa Fujimoto, Itsuki Aoki, Banny Oikawa, Rina Shingaki, Momo Kohgo and many others.

Ishikawa competed for several championships promoted by Ice Ribbon. She is also known for competing in the promotion's "P's Party" branch of events. At Ice Ribbon P's Party #75 on May 19, 2021, she fell short to Satsuki Totoro in a number one contender's match for the IW19 Championship. At Ice Ribbon New Ice Ribbon #1142 ~ Ice In Wonderland 2021 on August 28, Ishikawa teamed up with Miku Aono and unsuccessfully challenged Azure Revolution (Maya Yukihi and Risa Sera) for the International Ribbon Tag Team Championship. At Ice Ribbon New Ice Ribbon #1187 on March 20, 2022, Ishikawa unsuccessfully challenged reigning champion Yuki Mashiro and Riko Kaiju in a three-way match for the Triangle Ribbon Championship. Ishikawa competed in the first rounds of a tournament held for the vacant ICE Cross Infinity Championship where she fell short to Satsuki Totoro in the firsty rounds from Ice Ribbon New Ice Ribbon #1203 ~ Yokohama Ribbon 2022 on May 28.

Ishikawa wrestled her last match in the promotion at Ice Ribbon New Ice Ribbon #1268 where she went into a draw in a gauntlet match against the big majority of the time's roster which involved Chie Ozora, Ibuki Hoshi, Kyuri, Misa Kagura, Sumika Yanagawa and many others.

=== World Wonder Ring Stardom (2023) ===
Ishikawa competed in a match promoted by World Wonder Ring Stardom. The bout occurred at Stardom New Blood 8 on May 12, 2023, where she cosplayed Tam Nakano as she wrestled against her very self, coming up unsuccessful.

=== Dream Star Fighting Marigold (2024–present) ===
In April 2024, Ishikawa was announced as part of the newly created promotion of Dream Star Fighting Marigold. At their inaugural event, the Marigold Fields Forever from May 20, 2024, she fell short to Miku Aono in singles competition. At Marigold Summer Destiny on July 13, 2024, Ishikawa teamed up with Nanae Takahashi and Mai Sakurai in defeat against Shinobu Kandori, Takako Inoue, and NORI. On November 4, 2024, Ishikawa won a first singles match in Marigold for the first time when she defeated Naho Yamada.
