= Marigold New Year's Golden Garden 2026 =

2026 Dream Star Fighting Marigold event

- Promotional poster for the event featuring Mayu Iwatani
- Promotion: Dream Star Fighting Marigold
- Date: January 24, 2026
- City: Tokyo, Japan
- Venue: Korakuen Hall
- Attendance: 1,195
- Tagline: Mayu Iwatani 15th Anniversary ~ICON Forever~

Event chronology
| ← Previous; First Dream | Next → Shine Forever |

New Year's Golden Garden chronology
| ← Previous; 2025 | Next → — |

Marigold New Year's Golden Garden 2026 was a multiple-night professional wrestling event promoted by Dream Star Fighting Marigold. The pay-per-view night of the event took place on January 24, 2026, in Tokyo, Japan, at the Korakuen Hall. The event aired globally on CyberFight's video-on-demand service Wrestle Universe. It portrayed Mayu Iwatani's 15 Anniversary since her professional wrestling debut.

== Production ==
=== Background ===
The show featured professional wrestling matches that result from scripted storylines, where wrestlers portrayed villains, heroes, or less distinguishable characters in the scripted events that built tension and culminated in a wrestling match or series of matches.

=== Event ===
The event started with a three-way bout won by Shoko Koshino which also involved Hummingbird and Yuuka Yamazaki. Next up, Nagisa Nozaki and Rea Seto picked up a victory over Chika Goto and Nao Ishikawa in tag team competition. The third bout saw Komomo Minami and Marigold United National Champion Victoria Yuzuki wrestling into a time-limit draw as a result of a non-title bout. Next up, Erina Yamanaka, Mai Sakurai and Natsumi Showzuki picked up a victory over Kouki Amarei, Megaton and Miku Aono in the first rounds of the inaugural Marigold 3D Trios Championship tournament. The semi main event saw Chiaki and Misa Matsui defeat 2025 Twin Star Cup winners Seri Yamaoka and Shinno to secure the fourth consecutive defense of the Marigold Twin Star Championship in that respective reign.

In the main event, Mayu Iwatani defeated Utami Hayashishita to secure the first successful defense of the GHC Women's Championship in that respective reign.

== Results ==
| No. | Results | Stipulations | Times |
|---|---|---|---|
| 1 | Shoko Koshino defeated Hummingbird and Yuuka Yamazaki by pinfall | Three-way match | 8:23 |
| 2 | Darkness Revolution (Nagisa Nozaki and Rea Seto) defeated Chika Goto and Nao Ishikawa by pinfall | Tag team match | 11:11 |
| 3 | Komomo Minami vs. Victoria Yuzuki ended in a time-limit draw | Singles match | 15:00 |
| 4 | Erina Yamanaka, Mai Sakurai and Natsumi Showzuki defeated Kouki Amarei, Megaton and Miku Aono by pinfall | Marigold 3D Trios Championship tournament first round match | 16:38 |
| 5 | Darkness Revolution (Chiaki and Misa Matsui) (c) defeated Seri Yamaoka and Shinno by pinfall | Tag team match for the Marigold Twin Star Championship | 13:35 |
| 6 | Mayu Iwatani (c) defeated Utami Hayashishita by pinfall | Singles match for the GHC Women's Championship | 14:45 |
(c) / – the champion(s) heading into the match
