= Marigold Dream Star Grand Prix 2026 =

2026 Dream Star Fighting Marigold wrestling tournament

- Promotional poster of the event finals
- Promotion: Dream Star Fighting Marigold
- Date: August 28 – September 20, 2026
- City: Tokyo, Japan; Osaka, Japan; Fukushima, Japan; Shizuoka, Japan; Kariya, Japan
- Venue: Korakuen Hall; Shinjuku Face; Osaka 176 Box; Sunpearl Arakawa; Will Fukushima Act Oroshimachi; Shimizu Marine Building

Event chronology
← Previous; Summer Destiny 2026	Next → Grand Destiny 2026

Dream Star Grand Prix chronology
← Previous; 2025	Next → —

Marigold Dream Star Grand Prix
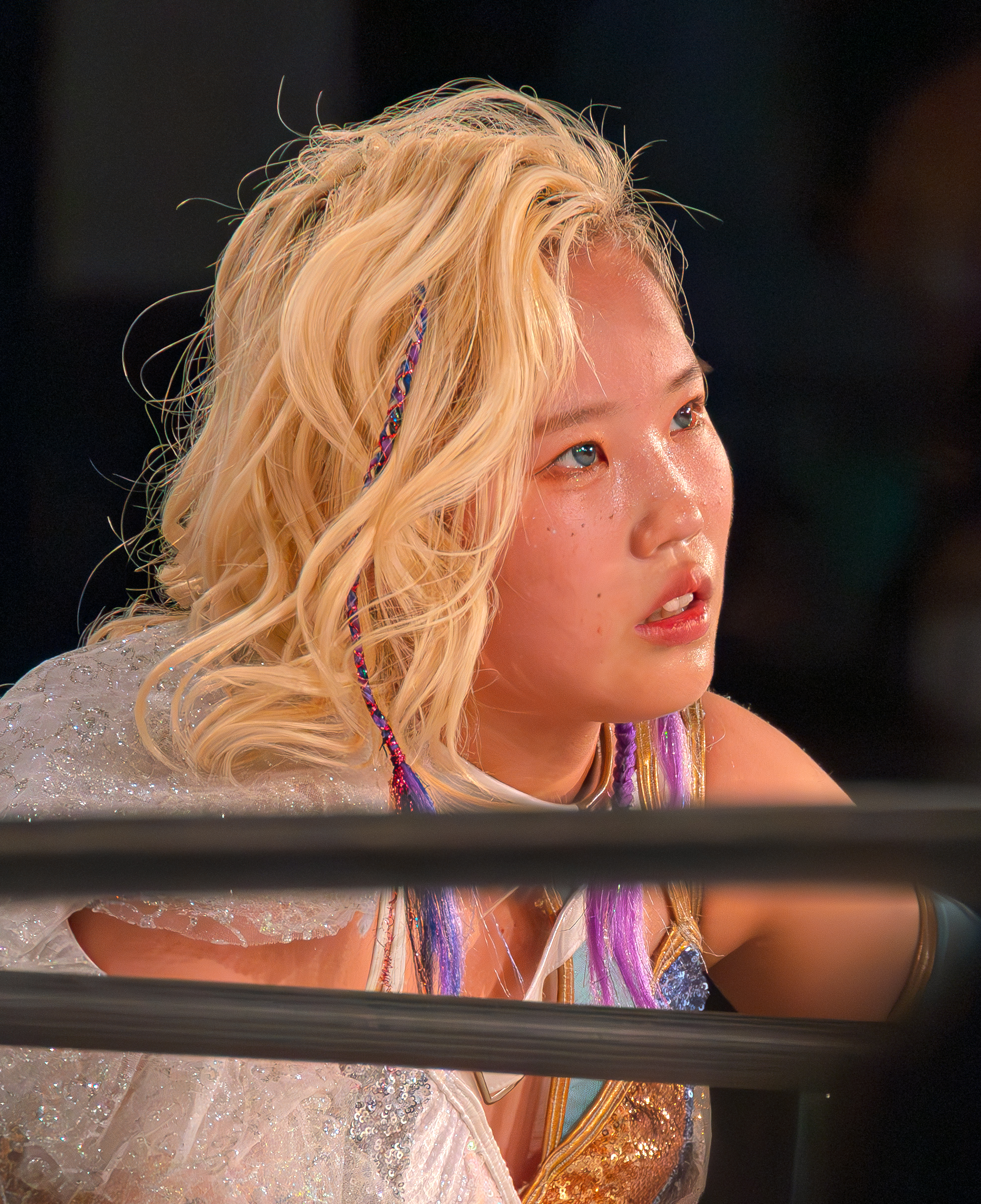
- Victoria Yuzuki, winner of the 2026 Dream Star Grand Prix.

Tournament information
- Sport: Professional wrestling
- Location: Japan
- Dates: August 28, 2026–September 20, 2026
- Tournament format: Two-block round-robin
- Participants: 24

Final positions
- Champions: Victoria Yuzuki
- Runner-up: Rea Seto

Marigold Dream Star Grand Prix 2026 (マリーゴールドドリームスターグランプリ2026, Marīgōrudo dorīmu sutā guranpuri 2026), stylized as DREAM✴︎STAR GP 2026, was a professional wrestling tournament promoted by the Japanese promotion Dream Star Fighting Marigold. It took place between August 28 and September 20, 2026.

== Tournament history ==
The Dream Star Grand Prix is a professional wrestling tournament held by Marigold. Similar to Bushiroad-owned counterpart tournaments New Japan Pro-Wrestling's G1 Climax and Stardom 5 Star Grand Prix, it is held as a round-robin tournament with wrestlers split into two pools. The winner of each pool competed in the final to decide the winner. As is the case with Bushiroad tournaments, a win is two points and a draw is one point for each wrestler.

=== Storylines ===
The event featured professional wrestling matches that resulted from scripted storylines, where wrestlers portrayed villains, heroes, or less distinguishable characters in the scripted events that built tension and culminated in a wrestling match or series of matches.

== Participants ==
*Noted underneath are the champions who held their titles at the time of the tournament. The titleholders or even the number of contestants can change over time.

Wrestler	Notes
Aleah James	Freelancer
Chi Chi	Freelancer
Chiaki	Marigold 3D Trios Champion
Chika Goto	Marigold Twin Star Champion
Diana Strong	Freelancer
Erina Yamanaka	
Hummingbird	
Komomo Minami	
Kouki Amarei	Marigold Twin Star Champion
Mai Sakurai	
Mayu Iwatani	Marigold Super Fly Champion
Megaton	Independent World Junior Heavyweight Champion
Miku Aono	Marigold World Champion
Mila Smidt	Freelancer
Misa Matsui	Marigold 3D Trios Champion
Nagisa Nozaki	
Nagisa Tachibana	
Nao Ishikawa	
Natsumi Showzuki	
Rea Seto	Marigold 3D Trios Champion
Shinno	
Syoko Koshino	
Victoria Yuzuki	Marigold United National Champion; Winner
Yuuka Yamazaki	

== Standings ==
=== Overview ===
Current standings
Block A		Block B		Block C		Block D	
Miku Aono	7	Mayu Iwatani	8	Victoria Yuzuki	8	Kouki Amarei	10
Yuuka Yamazaki	6	Chiaki	6	Diana Strong	6	Rea Seto	6
Misa Matsui	5	Mila Smidt	6	Mai Sakurai	6	Chika Goto	4
Natsumi Showzuki	4	Nagisa Nozaki	4	Syoko Koshino	4	Shinno	4
Aleah James	4	Komomo Minami	4	Hummingbird	4	Nagisa Tachibana	4
Erina Yamanaka	4	Nao Ishikawa	2	Chi Chi	2	Megaton	2

Block A	Aono	Showzuki	Matsui	Yamanaka	Yamazaki	James
Aono	—N/a	Aono (11:48)	Draw (15:00)	Aono (10:40)	Yamazaki (12:03)	Aono (06:07)
Showzuki	Aono (11:48)	—N/a	Matsui (09:27)	Showzuki (07:58)	Showzuki (08:24)	James (07:35)
Matsui	Draw (15:00)	Matsui (09:27)	—N/a	Matsui (09:42)	Yamazaki (09:29)	James (07:35)
Yamanaka	Aono (10:40)	Showzuki (07:58)	Matsui (09:42)	—N/a	Yamanaka (10:01)	Yamanaka (05:47)
Yamazaki	Yamazaki (12:03)	Showzuki (08:24)	Yamazaki (09:29)	Yamanaka (10:01)	—N/a	Yamazaki (06:20)
James	Aono (06:07)	James (07:35)	James (07:35)	Yamanaka (05:47)	Yamazaki (06:20)	—N/a

Block B	Iwatani	Nozaki	Chiaki	Ishikawa	Minami	Smidt
Iwatani	—N/a	Iwatani (7:35)	Chiaki (11:42)	Iwatani; Default	Iwatani (11:35)	Iwatani (10:05)
Nozaki	Iwatani (7:35)	—N/a	Nozaki (10:46)	Ishikawa (05:52)	Nozaki (07:56)	Smidt; Default
Chiaki	Chiaki (11:42)	Nozaki (10:46)	—N/a	Chiaki; Default	Minami (08:37)	Chiaki (07:11)
Ishikawa	Iwatani; Default	Ishikawa (05:52)	Chiaki; Default	—N/a	Minami; Default	Smidt (05:29)
Minami	Iwatani (11:35)	Nozaki (07:56)	Minami (08:37)	Minami; Default	—N/a	Smidt (08:45)
Smidt	Iwatani (10:05)	Smidt; Default	Chiaki (07:11)	Smidt (05:29)	Smidt (08:45)	—N/a

Block C	Yuzuki	Sakurai	Koshino	Hummingbird	Chi Chi	Strong
Yuzuki	—N/a	Yuzuki (11:10)	Yuzuki (10:10)	Yuzuki (09:23)	Yuzuki; Default	Strong (13:37)
Sakurai	Yuzuki (11:10)	—N/a	Sakurai (07:58)	Sakurai (07:36)	Sakurai (11:47)	Strong (10:18)
Koshino	Yuzuki (10:10)	Sakurai (07:58)	—N/a	Hummingbird (07:59)	Koshino; Default	Koshino (07:30)
Hummingbird	Yuzuki (09:23)	Sakurai (07:36)	Hummingbird (07:59)	—N/a	Chi Chi (08:28)	Hummingbird (08:24)
Chi Chi	Yuzuki; Default	Sakurai (11:47)	Koshino; Default	Chi Chi (08:28)	—N/a	Strong (09:24)
Strong	Strong (13:37)	Strong (10:18)	Koshino (07:30)	Hummingbird (08:24)	Strong (09:24)	—N/a

Block D	Amarei	Goto	Shinno	Megaton	Seto	Tachibana
Amarei	—N/a	Amarei (11:23)	Amarei (09:34)	Amarei (04:58)	Amarei (09:26)	Amarei (04:44)
Goto	Amarei (11:23)	—N/a	Goto (09:25)	Megaton (07:18)	Goto (09:59)	Tachibana (06:18)
Shinno	Amarei (09:34)	Goto (09:25)	—N/a	Shinno (05:13)	Seto (09:38)	Shinno (10:29)
Megaton	Amarei (04:58)	Megaton (07:18)	Shinno (05:13)	—N/a	Seto (04:58)	Tachibana (05:45)
Seto	Amarei (09:26)	Goto (09:59)	Seto (09:38)	Seto (04:58)	—N/a	Seto (10:18)
Tachibana	Amarei (04:44)	Tachibana (06:18)	Shinno (10:29)	Tachibana (05:45)	Seto (10:18)	—N/a

Quarterfinals
B1	Mayu Iwatani	2:10
D2	Rea Seto	Pin
C2	Diana Strong	5:23
A1	Miku Aono	Pin
D1	Kouki Amarei	Pin
B2	Chiaki	8:12
A2	Yuuka Yamazaki	8:13
C1	Victoria Yuzuki	Pin

Semifinals
D2	Rea Seto	Pin
A1	Miku Aono	11:56
D1	Kouki Amarei	10:03
C1	Victoria Yuzuki	Pin

Finals
D2	Rea Seto	21:24
C1	Victoria Yuzuki	Pin
