= Marigold Summer Destiny 2026 =

2026 Dream Star Fighting Marigold event

- Promotional poster for the event
- Promotion: Dream Star Fighting Marigold
- Date: August 9, 2026
- City: Tokyo, Japan
- Venue: Ota City General Gymnasium
- Attendance: 1,310

Event chronology
| ← Previous; Shine Forever | Next → Dream Star Grand Prix 2026 |

Summer Destiny chronology
| ← Previous; 2024 | Next → — |

Marigold Summer Destiny 2026 was a professional wrestling event promoted by Dream Star Fighting Marigold. It took place on August 9, 2026, in Tokyo, Japan at the Ota City General Gymnasium. The event aired globally on CyberFight's video-on-demand service Wrestle Universe.

== Production ==
=== Background ===
The show featured professional wrestling matches that result from scripted storylines, where wrestlers portrayed villains, heroes, or less distinguishable characters in the scripted events that built tension and culminated in a wrestling match or series of matches.

=== Event ===
The event started with the singles confrontation between Hummingbird and Komomo Minami, solded with the victory of the latter. Next up, Aleah James and Shoko Koshino picked up a victory over Nao Ishikawa and The Lady AI in tag team competition. The third bout saw Unagi Sayaka outmatch Megaton in singles competition. Next up, Chiaki, Misa Matsui and Rea Seto defeated Erina Yamanaka, Mai Sakurai and Natsumi Showzuki to win the Marigold 3D Trios Championship, ending the latter team's reign at 167 days and two defenses. In the fifth bout, Chika Goto and Kouki Amarei defeated Shinno and Yuuka Yamazaki to secure the third consecutive defense of the Marigold Twin Star Championship in that respective reign. In the semi main event, Sareee and Takumi Iroha picked up a victory over Mayu Iwatani and Victoria Yuzuki in tag team competition.

In the main event, Miku Aono defeated Nagisa Nozaki to secure the sixth consecutive defense of the Marigold World Championship in that respective reign.

== Results ==
| No. | Results | Stipulations | Times |
|---|---|---|---|
| 1 | Komomo Minami defeated Hummingbird by pinfall | Singles match | 6:07 |
| 2 | Shoko Koshino and Aleah James defeated Nao Ishikawa and The Lady AI by pinfall | Tag team match | 12:17 |
| 3 | Unagi Sayaka defeated Megaton by pinfall | Singles match | 7:39 |
| 4 | Darkness Revolution (Chiaki, Misa Matsui and Rea Seto) defeated La Vie en Rose (Mai Sakurai, Erina Yamanaka, and Natsumi Showzuki) (c) by pinfall | Six-woman tag team match for the Marigold 3D Trios Championship | 15:05 |
| 5 | tWin toWer (Kouki Amarei and Chika Goto) (c) defeated Shinno and Yuuka Yamazaki by pinfall | Tag team match for the Marigold Twin Star Championship | 13:27 |
| 6 | Spark Rush (Sareee and Takumi Iroha) defeated Mayu Iwatani and Victoria Yuzuki by pinfall | Tag team match | 19:13 |
| 7 | Miku Aono (c) defeated Nagisa Nozaki by pinfall | Singles match for the Marigold World Championship | 18:41 |
(c) / – the champion(s) heading into the match
