= Marigold First Dream 2026 =

2026 Dream Star Fighting Marigold event

- Promotional poster for the event
- Promotion: Dream Star Fighting Marigold
- Date: January 3, 2026
- City: Tokyo, Japan
- Venue: Ota City General Gymnasium
- Attendance: 1,812

Event chronology
← Previous; Grand Destiny	Next → New Years Golden Garden

First Dream chronology
← Previous; 2025	Next → —

Marigold First Dream 2026 was a professional wrestling event promoted by Dream Star Fighting Marigold. It took place on January 3, 2026, in Tokyo, Japan at the Ota City General Gymnasium. The event aired globally on CyberFight's video-on-demand service Wrestle Universe.

== Production ==
=== Background ===
The show featured professional wrestling matches that result from scripted storylines, where wrestlers portrayed villains, heroes, or less distinguishable characters in the scripted events that built tension and culminated in a wrestling match or series of matches.

=== Event ===
The event started with the six-woman tag team confrontation between the teams of Kizuna Tanaka, Komomo Minami and Yuuka Yamazaki, and Seri Yamaoka, Shinno and CoCo, solded with the victory of the latters. Next up, Kouki Amarei, Natsumi Showzuki and Hummingbird picked up a victory over Nao Ishikawa, Nagisa Tachibana and Momoka Hanazono in another six-woman tag team bout. In the third bout, Kuroshio Tokyo Japan was revealed as Megaton's mystery opponent, as they fought in a three-stage challenge with all bouts won by Kuroshio. The fourth match saw Utami Hayashishita defeat Chika Goto in singles competition. Next up, Misa Matsui and Chiaki defeated Nagisa Nozaki and Rea Seto to secure the third consecutive defense of the Marigold Twin Star Championship in that respective reign. In the sixth bout, Victoria Yuzuki defeated Shoko Koshino to secure the third consecutive defense of the Marigold United National Championship in that respective reign. In the semi main event, Mayu Iwatani defeated Takumi Iroha to win the GHC Women's Championship, ending the latter's reign at 215 days and four defenses.

In the main event, Miku Aono defeated Mai Sakurai to secure the first successful defense of the Marigold World Championship in that respective reign.

== Results ==
No.	Results	Stipulations	Times
1	Seri Yamaoka, Shinno, and CoCo defeated Kizuna Tanaka, Komomo Minami, and Yuuka Yamazaki by pinfall	Six-woman tag team match	13:12
2	Natsumi Showzuki, Kouki Amarei, and Hummingbird defeated Momoka Hanazono, Nagisa Tachibana, and Nao Ishikawa by pinfall	Six-woman tag team match	9:59
3	Kuroshio Tokyo Japan defeated Megaton by pinfall	Singles match	3:36
4	Utami Hayashishita defeated Chika Goto by pinfall	Singles match	12:03
5	Darkness Revolution (Misa Matsui and Chiaki) (c) defeated Darkness Revolution (Rea Seto and Nagisa Nozaki) by pinfall	Tag team match for the Marigold Twin Star Championship	17:02
6	Victoria Yuzuki (c) defeated Shoko Koshino by pinfall	Singles match for the Marigold United National Championship	16:11
7	Mayu Iwatani defeated Takumi Iroha (c) by pinfall	Singles match for the GHC Women's Championship	25:09
8	Miku Aono (c) defeated Mai Sakurai by pinfall	Singles match for the Marigold World Championship	26:01
(c) / – the champion(s) heading into the match
