= Marigold Fields Forever =

2024 Dream Star Fighting Marigold event

- Promotional poster for the event featuring various wrestlers
- Promotion: Dream Star Fighting Marigold
- Date: May 20, 2024
- City: Tokyo, Japan
- Venue: Korakuen Hall
- Attendance: 1,535

Pay-per-view chronology
| ← Previous; First | Next → Summer Destiny |

Marigold Fields Forever was the inaugural professional wrestling event promoted by Dream Star Fighting Marigold. It took place on May 20, 2024, in Tokyo, Japan at the Korakuen Hall. The event aired globally on CyberFight's video-on-demand service Wrestle Universe.

== Production ==
=== Background ===
Upon the announcement of the creation of the promotion, Marigold has stated their intent is to run their first event (titled "Marigold Fields Forever") on May 20, 2024, at Korakuen Hall in Tokyo. The official match card of the event was announced on May 5, 2024, after a press conference.

The show featured six professional wrestling matches that result from scripted storylines, where wrestlers portrayed villains, heroes, or less distinguishable characters in the scripted events that built tension and culminated in a wrestling match or series of matches.

=== Event ===
The event started with an official presentation of the main roster, along with an introduction of Komomo Minami, Nagisa Tachibana, Ryoko Sakimura and Yuuki Minami, the four initial trainees of the promotion. President Rossy Ogawa briefly presented the Marigold World Championship and the Marigold United National Championship title designs.

The show started with the singles confrontation between Victoria Yuzuki and Nanae Takahashi solded with the victory of the latter. Next up, Miku Aono defeated Nao Ishikawa in singles competition. The third bout saw Mirai picking up a victory over Chiaki. Next up, Mai Sakurai and Zayda Steel wrestled Seadlinnng's Nagisa Nozaki and Myla Grace into a time-limit draw. In the semi main event, Amarei Kouki and Chika Goto defeated Natsumi Showzuki and Misa Matsui in tag team competition.

In the main event, Sareee and Bozilla defeated Giulia and Utami Hayashishita. After the bout concluded, the four wrestlers swapped the World and United National Championships as they teased further confrontations for the upcoming titles.

== Results ==
| No. | Results | Stipulations | Times |
|---|---|---|---|
| 1 | Nanae Takahashi defeated Victoria Yuzuki by pinfall | Singles match | 14:15 |
| 2 | Miku Aono defeated Nao Ishikawa by pinfall | Singles match | 8:55 |
| 3 | Mirai defeated Chiaki by pinfall | Singles match | 11:30 |
| 4 | Mai Sakurai and Zayda Steel vs. Nagisa Nozaki and Myla Grace ended in a time limit draw | Tag team match | 15:00 |
| 5 | Kouki Amarei and Chika Goto defeated Natsumi Showzuki and Misa Matsui by pinfall | Tag team match | 12:30 |
| 6 | Sareee and Bozilla defeated Giulia and Utami Hayashishita by pinfall | Tag team match | 28:06 |
