= Erina Yamanaka =

Japanese wrestler (born 1989)

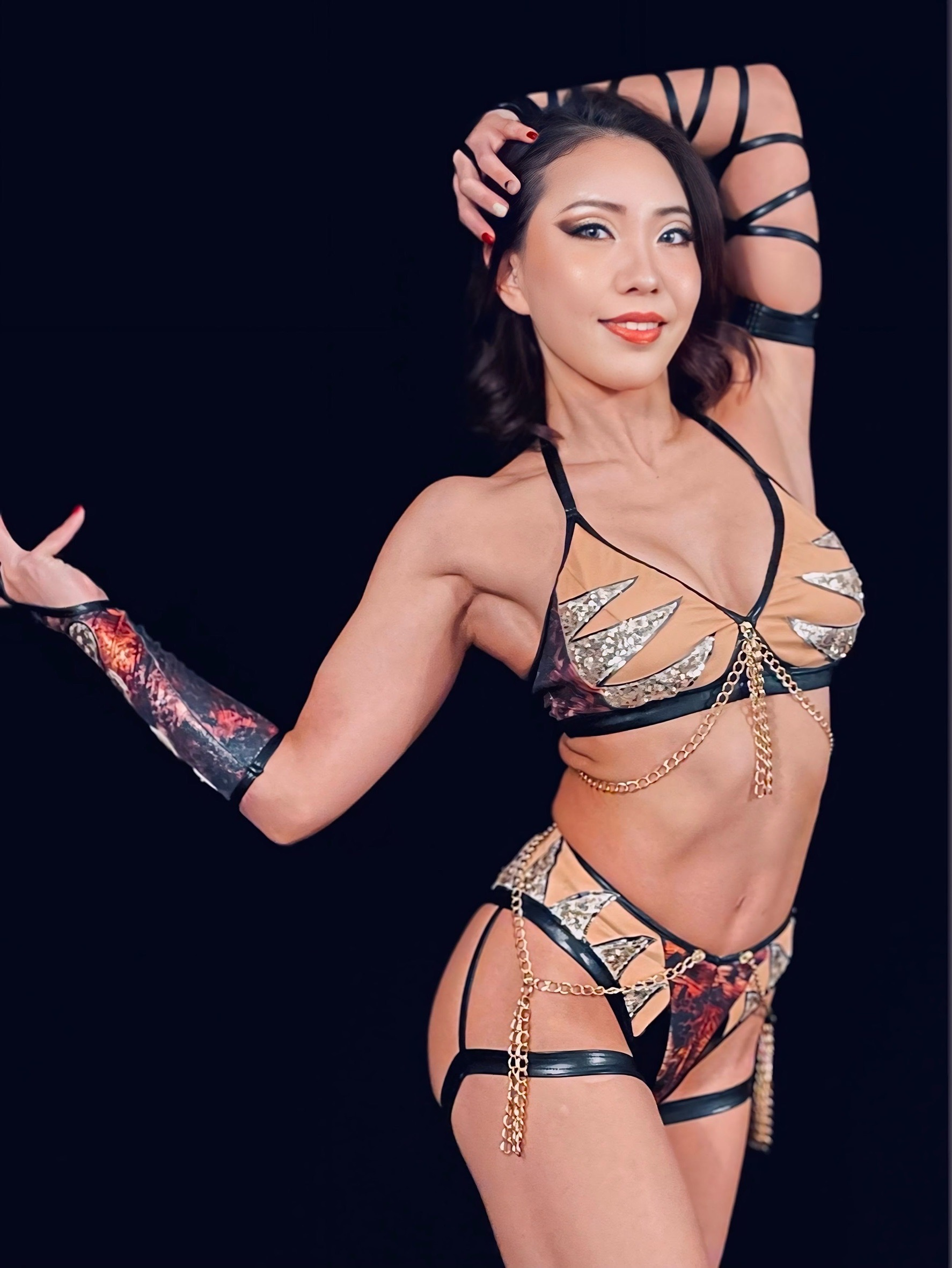
- Yamanaka in October 2025

Personal information
- Born: 24 May 1986 (age 40) Toyonaka, Japan

Professional wrestling career
- Ring name: Erina Yamanaka
- Billed height: 170 cm (5 ft 7 in)
- Billed weight: 52 kg (115 lb)
- Debut: 2019

Erina Yamanaka (山中絵里奈, Yamanaka Erina) is a Japanese professional wrestler, fitness model and yoga instructor. She is currently signed to Dream Star Fighting Marigold, where she is a member of La Vie en Rose, and was one third of the inaugural Marigold 3D Trios Champions. Yamanaka also previously competed in Best Body Japan Pro-Wrestling.

== Background ==
Yamanaka has a background as a yoga instructor and has transitioned to professional wrestling, leveraging her flexibility and excellent body control. Known as "Erina-sama," her dual-personality in the ring, combining beauty and strength, she also works as a fitness model and instructor at Bikram Yoga Kanamecho. She is also actively involved in physical expression and promotion, and is gaining attention for spreading the appeal of women's professional wrestling.

In 2023, she won the Miss Professional Sports category at the Best Body Japan East Japan competition, where she was recognized for her healthy beauty and performance. She was also featured in the competition's photo gallery. She is a member of DPG (Duncan Pro Wrestling Corps).

== Professional wrestling career ==
=== Best Body Japan Pro-Wrestling (2019–2026) ===
Yamanaka made her professional wrestling debut on August 9, 2019, at BBJ Muscle Ring 9 First Anniversary, where she fell short to Mina Shirakawa in singles competition. On November 3, 2025, at the Best Body Japan Pro Wrestling Yasuhiro Higuchi Support Tournament held at the Sportiva Arena in Nagoya, Yamanaka faced Chanyota in a singles match, which ended in a 15-minute time limit draw.

On February 13, 2026, Yamanaka announced her departure from Best Body Japan.

=== Dream Star Fighting Marigold (2025–present) ===
On February 20, 2025, Yamanaka announced that she would be competing in Dream Star Fighting Marigold going forward. On March 30, Yamanaka would unsuccessfully challenge Mai Sakurai for the Marigold United National Championship. At Shine Forever on May 24, she teamed up with Chanyota, Nagisa Tachibana and Ryoko Sakimura in a losing effort against Darkness Revolution (CHIAKI, Nagisa Nozaki, Misa Matsui and Megaton). On July 29, Yamanaka unsuccessfully challenged Mayu Iwatani for the Super Fly Championship. At Marigold Grand Destiny on October 26, Yamanaka teamed up with Chanyota and competed in a Gauntlet tag team match won by Syoko Koshino and Gigaton.

Yamanaka would later form the trio La Vie en Rose with Mai Sakurai and Natsumi Showzuki. They competed in the inaugural tournament for the Marigold 3D Trios Championship. They defeated Kouki Amarei, Megaton and Miku Aono in the first round, Seri Yamaoka, Syoko Koshino and Yuuka Yamazaki in the second, and Darkness Revolution in the finals to become the inaugural champions.

On April 11, 2026, Yamanaka suffered a fractured orbital socket on a moonsault from Mayu Iwatani. Iwatani would also simultaneously fracture her big toe delivering the moonsault. Yamanaka would make a brief appearance in Utami Hayashishita's farewell gauntlet match on May 16, before making her official return on June 20. On July 30, Yamanaka announced she was signing with Marigold full time. On August 9, at Summer Destiny, La Vie en Rose lost the 3D Trios Championship to Darkness Revolution.

== Championships and accomplishments ==
- Best Body Japan Pro-Wrestling
  - BBW Women's Championship (2 times)
  - BBW Super Bodyweight Championship (1 time)
  - BBW Joshi Tag Team Championship (1 times) – with Yoshiko Hasegawa
- Dream Star Fighting Marigold
  - Marigold 3D Trios Championship (1 time, inaugural) – with Mai Sakurai and Natsumi Showzuki
