= Marigold 3D Trios Championship =

Professional wrestling trios championship

- Current title design (2026–present)

Details
- Promotion: Dream Star Fighting Marigold
- Date established: January 20, 2026
- Current champions: Darkness Revolution (Chiaki, Misa Matsui, and Rea Seto)
- Date won: August 9, 2026
Statistics
- First champions: Le Vie en Rose (Mai Sakurai, Natsumi Showzuki, and Erina Yamanaka)
- Oldest champion: Erina Yamanaka (39 years, 8 months and 30 days)
- Youngest champion: Rea Seto (25 years, 7 months and 3 days)
- Heaviest champion: Chiaki (132 lbs)
- Lightest champion: Natsumi Showzuki (110 lbs)

The Marigold 3D Trios Championship (Japanese: マリーゴールド3Dトリオス王座, Hepburn: Marīgōrudo 3D Toriosu Ōza; "3D" shortened from "Dream, Diamond, Destiny") is a professional wrestling six-woman tag team championship owned by the Dream Star Fighting Marigold promotion.

== Title history ==
During a house show from January 20, 2026, Dream Star Fighting Marigold announced the creation of the Marigold 3D Trios Championship, which was set to be one of the titles contested for in the promotion's tag team division. The inaugural champions are scheduled to be decided on February 23, 2026.

=== Inaugural tournament (2026) ===
Marigold confirmed the participants of the eight-team inaugural tournament for the titles alongside the first artwork of the belt main plates on January 20, 2026. The inaugural tournament was scheduled to take place beginning on January 24, 2026, at New Year's Golden Garden and concluding on February 23, 2026.

First round (January 24, 30 & February 7)
La Vie en Rose (Mai Sakurai, Natsumi Showzuki, and Erina Yamanaka)	Pin
Kouki Amarei, Megaton and Miku Aono	16:38
Hummingbird, Nagisa Tachibana and Nao Ishikawa	11:30
Seri Yamaoka, Shoko Koshino and Yuuka Yamazaki	Pin
Chanyota, Chika Goto and Utami Hayashishita	13:44
Darkness Revolution (Nagisa Nozaki, Misa Matsui and Rea Seto)	Pin
Mayu Iwatani, Victoria Yuzuki and Komomo Minami	Pin
Sofia Sivan, Dream Girl Ellie and Alivia Rose	10:59

Semifinals (February 13, 15)
La Vie en Rose (Mai Sakurai, Natsumi Showzuki, and Erina Yamanaka)	Pin
Seri Yamaoka, Shoko Koshino and Yuuka Yamazaki	16:03
Darkness Revolution (Nagisa Nozaki, Misa Matsui and Rea Seto)	Pin
Mayu Iwatani, Victoria Yuzuki and Komomo Minami	11:58

Final (February 23)
La Vie en Rose (Mai Sakurai, Natsumi Showzuki, and Erina Yamanaka)	Pin
Darkness Revolution (Nagisa Nozaki, Misa Matsui, and Rea Seto)	13:12

== Reigns ==
As of October 24, 2026, there have been a total of two reigns shared between two teams consisting of six different wrestlers. The current champions are Darkness Revolution (Chiaki, Misa Matsui, and Rea Seto), who are in their first reign as a team as well as individually. They won the titles by defeating La Vie en Rose (Mai Sakurai, Natsumi Showzuki, and Erina Yamanaka) at Summer Destiny in Tokyo, Japan, on August 9, 2026.

Key
No.	Overall reign number
Reign	Reign number for the specific team—reign numbers for the individuals are in parentheses, if different
Days	Number of days held
Defenses	Number of successful defenses
+	Current reign is changing daily

No.	Champion	Championship change			Reign statistics			Notes	Ref.
No.	Champion	Date	Event	Location	Reign	Days	Defenses	Notes	Ref.
1	La Vie en Rose (Mai Sakurai, Natsumi Showzuki, and Erina Yamanaka)	February 23, 2026	New Years Golden Garden (Night 12)	Tokyo, Japan	1	167	2	Defeated Darkness Revolution (Nagisa Nozaki, Misa Matsui and Rea Seto) in the finals of an eight-team tournament to determine the inaugural champions.	
2	Darkness Revolution (Chiaki, Misa Matsui, and Rea Seto)	August 9, 2026	Summer Destiny	Tokyo, Japan	1	76+	1		

== Combined reigns ==
As of October 24, 2026.

=== By team ===
†	Indicates the current champions

Rank	Wrestler	No. of reigns	Combined defenses	Combined days
1	La Vie en Rose (Mai Sakurai, Natsumi Showzuki, and Erina Yamanaka)	1	2	167
2	Darkness Revolution † (Chiaki, Misa Matsui, and Rea Seto)	1	1	76+

=== By wrestler ===
Rank	Wrestler	No. of reigns	Combined defenses	Combined days
1	Mai Sakurai	1	2	167
1	Natsumi Showzuki	1	2	167
1	Erina Yamanaka	1	2	167
2	Chiaki †	1	1	76+
2	Misa Matsui †	1	1	76+
2	Rea Seto †	1	1	76+
