= Darkness Revolution =

Professional wrestling stable

- Official logo (2025–present)

Stable
- Members: Nagisa Nozaki; CHIAKI; Misa Matsui; Rea Seto
- Name(s): Darkness Revolution; Dark Wolf Army
- Former members: See below
- Debut: July 21, 2024
- Years active: 2024–present

Darkness Revolution (ダークネス レボリューション, Dākunesu Reboryūshon) is a professional wrestling stable mainly performing in the Japanese professional wrestling promotion Dream Star Fighting Marigold. The stable currently consists of Nagisa Nozaki, CHIAKI, Misa Matsui and Rea Seto. It is the first-ever unit formed in Marigold.

== History ==
=== Dark Wolf Army (2024–2025) ===
On July 21, 2024, Nagisa Nozaki and CHIAKI entered a tournament to crown the inaugural Marigold Twin Star Champions under the tag name of "Dark Wolf Army". They defeated Rea Seto and Komomo Minami in the first round, then fell short to MiraiSaku (MIRAI and Mai Sakurai) in the second round. On December 13, 2024, Nozaki & CHIAKI defeated MIRAI & Sakurai for the Marigold Twin Star Championship. Nozaki and CHIAKI lost the titles three weeks later at First Dream on January 3, 2025, to Bozilla and Tank.

=== Darkness Revolution (2025–present) ===
On February 7, 2025, Misa Matsui lost a Super Fly Championship match to champion Victoria Yuzuki. After the match, Matsui was recruited to Dark Wolf Army by Nozaki and CHIAKI. Matsui officially joined the group during a press conference on February 13, turning heel in the process. On February 16, Bozilla and Megaton joined and the unit changed their name to Darkness Revolution, the first faction in Marigold history. Bozilla would leave the group, and Marigold itself, on April 12. On June 14, Megaton was kicked out of the group after her and Nozaki lost to Mayu Iwatani and Victoria Yuzuki.

On July 12, Rea Seto would join the group after turning heel and attacking Victoria Yuzuki with a chair. On October 25, Matsui and CHIAKI defeated Maria and Riko Kawahata for the Twin Star Championship at Grand Destiny, giving Matsui her first career championship and making CHIAKI the first two-time champion in Marigold history. On January 3, 2026, Matsui and CHIAKI successfully defended the championships against Nozaki and Seto at First Dream.

== Members ==
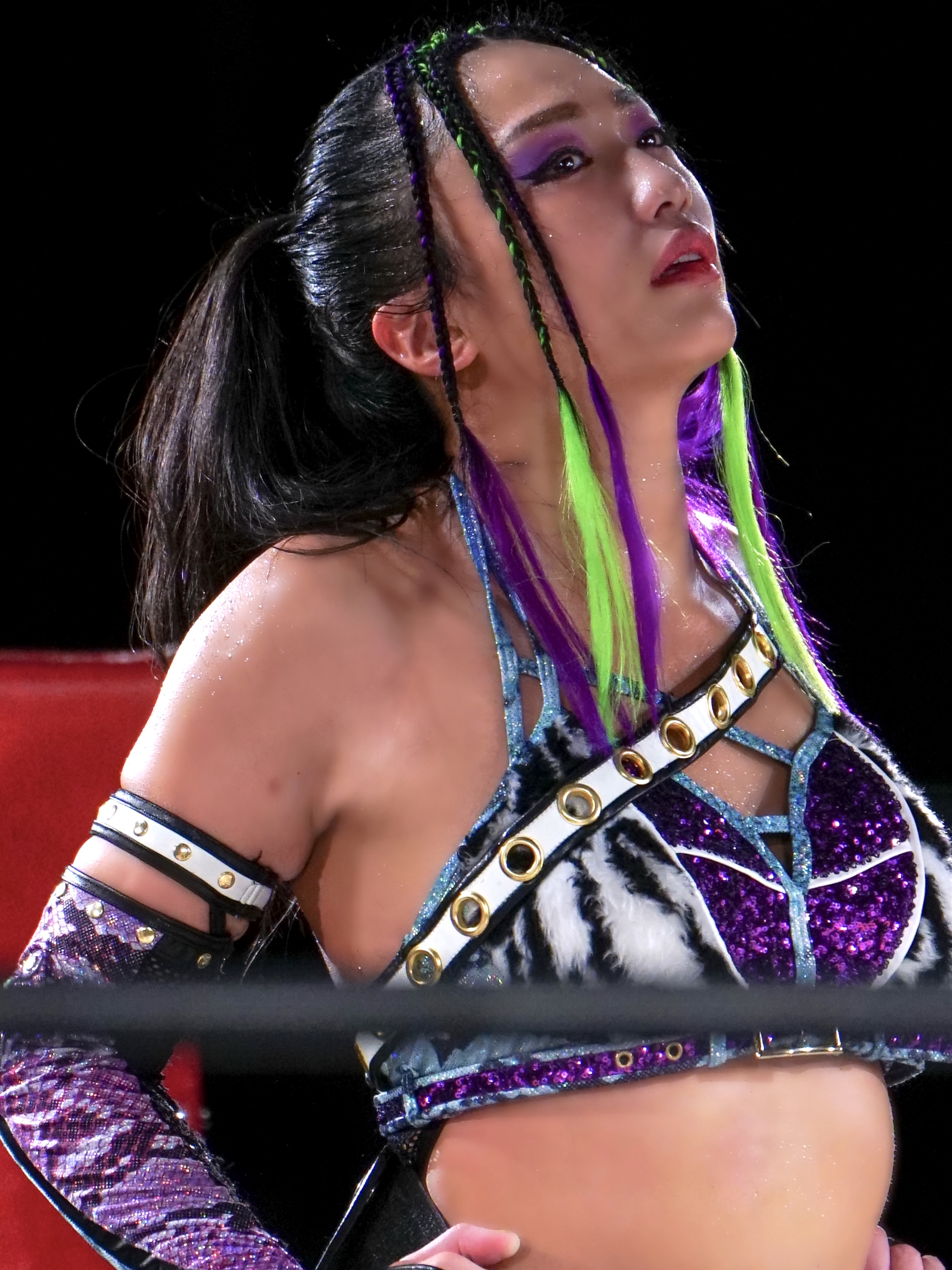
Nagisa Nozaki

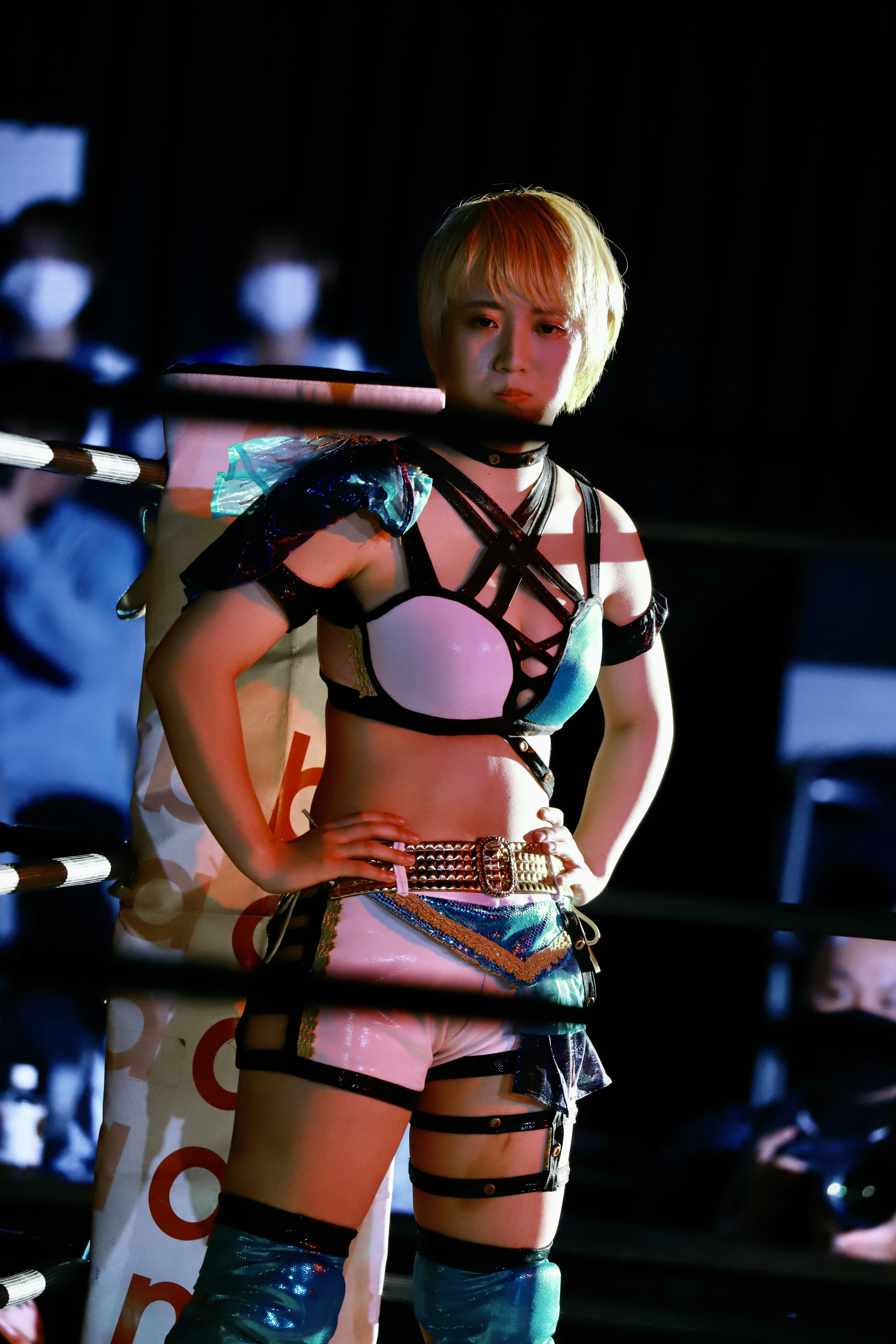
Misa Matsui

*	Founding member
I	Leader

=== Current ===
Member		Joined
Nagisa Nozaki	*	July 21, 2024
CHIAKI	*	July 21, 2024
Misa Matsui		February 13, 2025
Rea Seto		July 12, 2025

=== Former ===
Member	Joined	Left
Bozilla	February 16, 2025	April 12, 2025 (Note: This was the last time Bozilla performed in Dream Star Fighting Marigold before transferring to World Wonder Ring Stardom.)
Megaton	February 16, 2025	June 14, 2025

== Sub-groups ==
Affiliate	Members	Tenure	Type
Dark Wolf Army	Nagisa Nozaki; CHIAKI	2024–present	Tag Team
Misa Matsui & CHIAKI	Misa Matsui; CHIAKI	2025–present	Tag Team

== Championships and accomplishments ==
- Dream Star Fighting Marigold
  - Marigold Twin Star Championship (2 times) – Nozaki and Chiaki (1) and Matsui and Chiaki (1)
  - Marigold 3D Trios Championship (1 time, current) – Chiaki, Matsui and Seto
  - Dream★Star GP Awards (1 time)
    - Technique Award (2025) – Matsui
  - Year-End Awards (1 time)
    - Best Tag Team Award (2025) – Matsui and Chiaki
