= Marigold Grand Destiny 2025 =

2025 Dream Star Fighting Marigold event

- Promotional poster for the event featuring various participants
- Promotion: Dream Star Fighting Marigold
- Date: October 26, 2025
- City: Tokyo, Japan
- Venue: Ryōgoku Kokugikan
- Attendance: 3,450

Event chronology
← Previous; Dream Star Grand Prix 2025	Next → First Dream 2026

Grand Destiny chronology
← Previous; First	Next → 2026

Marigold Grand Destiny 2025 was a professional wrestling event promoted by Dream Star Fighting Marigold. It took place on October 26, 2025, in Tokyo, Japan at the Ryōgoku Kokugikan. The event aired globally on CyberFight's video-on-demand service Wrestle Universe.

== Production ==
=== Background ===
The show featured professional wrestling matches that result from scripted storylines, where wrestlers portrayed villains, heroes, or less distinguishable characters in the scripted events that built tension and culminated in a wrestling match or series of matches.

=== Event ===
The event started with the singles confrontation between Shinno who was accompanied by her mother Michiko Omukai and Kizuna Tanaka who was accompanied by her mother Yumi Fukawa. The bout solded with the victory of Tanaka.

Next up, Shoko Koshino and Gigaton won a gauntlet tag team match by last eliminating Nagisa Nozaki and Rea Seto. The third bout saw Minoru Suzuki defeat Megaton in singles competition. Suzuki was revealed as the mystery competitor. Next up, Sareee defeated Chika Goto as the other mystery competitor revealed on the night of the event. The fifth bout saw Misa Matsui and Chiaki defeat Riko Kawahata and Maria to win the Marigold Twin Star Championship, ending the latter team's reign at 169 days and one defense. In the sixth match, Chihiro Hashimoto defeated Seri Yamaoka in singles competition. Next up, Victoria Yuzuki defeated Mai Sakurai to win the Marigold United National Championship, ending the latter's reign at 296 days and six defenses. In the main event, Miku Aono defeated Utami Hayashishita to win the Marigold World Championship, ending the latter's reign at 296 days and four defenses.

In the main event, WWE's Iyo Sky defeated Marigold Super Fly Champion Mayu Iwatani in a non-title bout.

== Results ==
No.	Results	Stipulations	Times
1	Kizuna Tanaka (with Yumi Fukawa) defeated Shinno (with Michiko Omukai) by pinfall	Singles match	6:00
2	Shoko Koshino and Gigaton defeated Nao Ishikawa and Hummingbird, Chanyota and Erina Yamanaka, Minami Yuuki and Nagisa Tachibana, Komomo Minami and Yuuka Yamazaki, and Darkness Revolution (Nagisa Nozaki and Rea Seto) by pinfall	Gauntlet tag team match	25:18
3	Minoru Suzuki defeated Megaton by stoppage	Singles match	6:27
4	Sareee defeated Chika Goto by pinfall	Singles match	11:40
5	Darkness Revolution (Misa Matsui and Chiaki) defeated Magenta (Riko Kawahata and Maria) (c) by pinfall	Tag team match for the Marigold Twin Star Championship	10:37
6	Chihiro Hashimoto defeated Seri Yamaoka by pinfall	Singles match	11:34
7	Victoria Yuzuki defeated Mai Sakurai (c) by pinfall	Singles match for the Marigold United National Championship	20:36
8	Miku Aono defeated Utami Hayashishita (c) by pinfall	Singles match for the Marigold World Championship	26:25
9	Iyo Sky defeated Mayu Iwatani by pinfall	Singles match	26:28
(c) / – the champion(s) heading into the match
