= Marigold Dream Star Grand Prix =

- Promotions: Dream Star Fighting Marigold
- First event: 2024
- Signature matches: Time-limited singles matches

Marigold Dream Star Grand Prix (Japanese: マリーゴールドドリームスターグランプリ, Hepburn: Marī gōrudo dorīmu sutā guranpuri), often stylized as Dream★Star GP (stylized in all caps) is an annual single-elimination tournament promoted by the Japanese professional wrestling promotion Dream Star Fighting Marigold.

== Tournament history ==
The Marigold Dream Star Grand Prix is a professional wrestling tournament held by Dream Star Fighting Marigold. It was first announced on July 13, 2024, during the Summer Destiny event. The participants of the tournament are divided by two separated block, Dream and Star Leagues. The tournament is held by various dates, which during the wrestles scores two points for winning, one point for a draw, and zero for losing, in a 15-minute time limit matches.

The inaugural tournament took place between August 31 and September 28, 2024, and was won by Utami Hayashishita.

== List of winners ==
Year	Tournament				Aftermath			
Year	Winner	Runner-up	Times won	No. of entrants	Challenged for	Match	Result	Ref
2024	Utami Hayashishita	Mai Sakurai	1	16	Marigold World Championship	vs. Sareee at First Dream 2025	Won	
2025	Miku Aono	Victoria Yuzuki	1	16	Marigold World Championship	vs. Utami Hayashishita at Grand Destiny 2025	Won	
2026	Victoria Yuzuki	Rea Seto	1	24	Marigold World Championship			

=== Record ===
Championship	Successful challenges	Attempts	Success rate
Marigold World Championship	3	2	1.000

== Dream★Star GP Awards ==
At the end of every tournament, the participants receives awards in different categories based on their performance during the tournament.

=== Dream League Best Match Award ===
Year	Date	Match	Location
2024	Kouki Amarei vs. MIRAI	September 20	Sendai, Miyagi, Japan
2025	Mayu Iwatani vs. Victoria Yuzuki	September 14	Tokyo, Japan

=== Star League Best Match Award ===
Year	Date	Match	Location
2024	Nanae Takahashi vs. Sareee	September 23	Tokyo, Japan
2025	Mai Sakurai vs. MIRAI	August 30	Tokyo, Japan

=== Fighting Spirit Award ===
Year	Wrestler
2024	Miku Aono
2025	Chika Goto

=== Outstanding Performance Award ===
Year	Wrestler
2024	Bozilla
2025	Kouki Amarei

=== Technique Award ===
Year	Wrestler
2024	Victoria Yuzuki
2025	Misa Matsui
