= GHC Women's Championship =

Professional wrestling championship

- Current championship design

Details
- Promotion: CyberFight
- Brand: Pro Wrestling Noah
- Date established: October 28, 2024
- Current champion: Mirai
- Date won: June 15, 2026
Statistics
- First champion: Kouki Amarei
- Longest reign: Takumi Iroha (215 days)
- Shortest reign: Mayu Iwatani (135 days)
- Oldest champion: Mayu Iwatani (32 years, 10 months and 15 days)
- Youngest champion: Mirai (26 years, 6 months and 12 days)
- Heaviest champion: Takumi Iroha (143 lb (65 kg))
- Lightest champion: Mayu Iwatani (110 lb (50 kg))

The Global Honored Crown (GHC) Women's Championship (Japanese: GHC女子王座, Hepburn: GHC Joshi Ōza) is a women's professional wrestling world championship created and promoted by the Japanese promotion Pro Wrestling Noah. Mirai is the current champion, in her first reign. She won the title by defeating Great Sakuya at Noah Wrestle Magic on June 15, 2026 in Tokyo, Japan.

== Title history ==
The championship was announced on October 28, 2024, and is currently contested exclusively among female wrestlers from the Japanese independent circuit, subsequently from outside of Noah and primarily of Dream Star Fighting Marigold, Marvelous That's Women Pro Wrestling or some many other pro wrestling promotions, since Noah lack of a proper women's division. The inaugural champion was determined at Pro Wrestling NOAH: Monday Magic Vol. 3 on November 11, 2024, in a 10-woman battle royal that was won by Kouki Amarei.

== Reigns ==
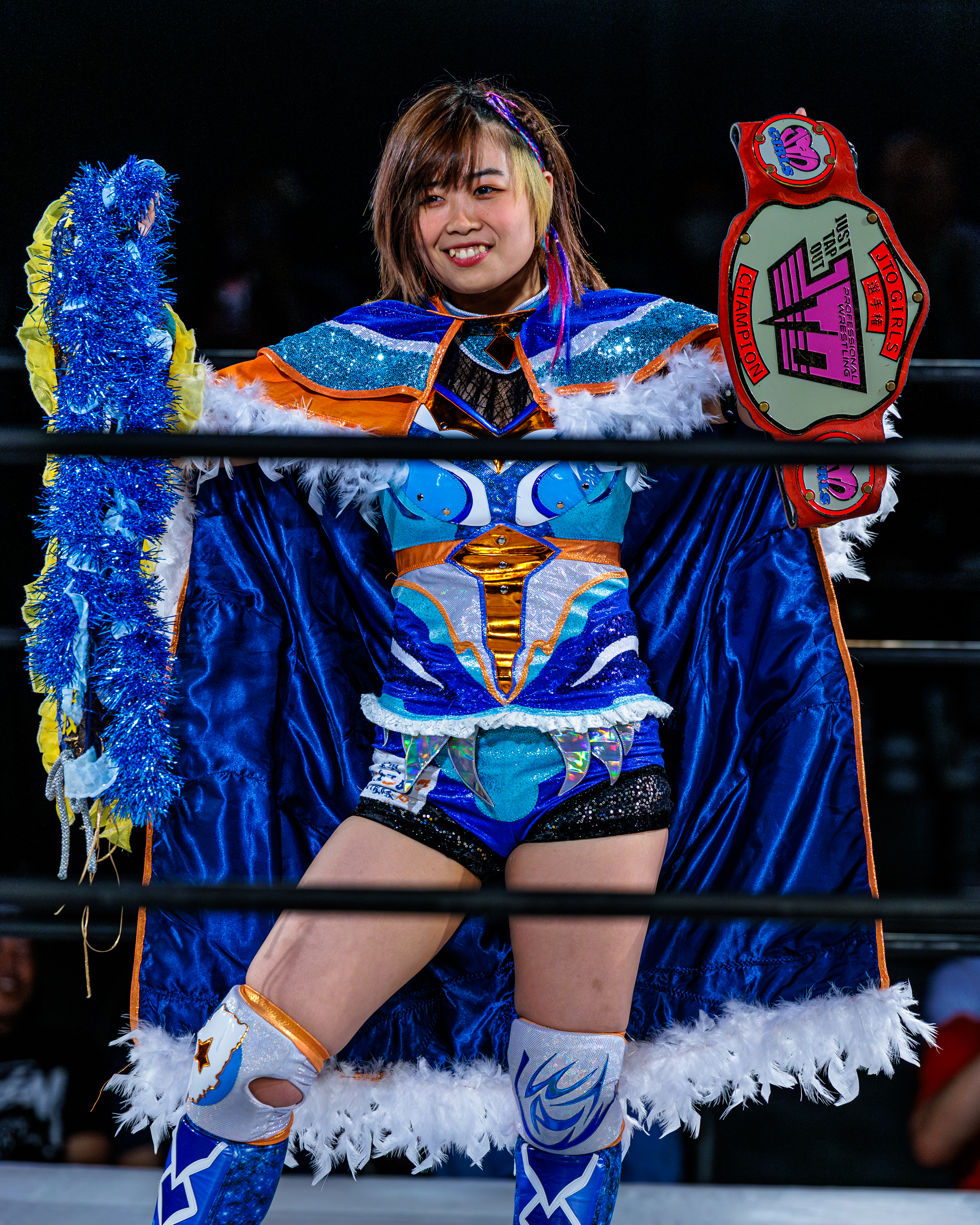
Current champion, Mirai.

As of November 3, 2026, there have been four reigns between four different champions. Kouki Amarei was the inaugural champion. Takumi Iroha has the longest reign at 215 days, while Mayu Iwatani's reign is the shortest at 135 days. Iroha had the most successful title defenses at four. Iwatani was the oldest champion when she won it at 32 years old, while Mirai is currently the youngest at 26 years old. The current champion is Mirai, who is in her first reign.

Key
No.	Overall reign number
Reign	Reign number for the specific champion
Days	Number of days held
Defenses	Number of successful defenses
<1	Reign lasted less than a day
+	Current reign is changing daily

No.	Champion	Championship change			Reign statistics			Notes	Ref.
No.	Champion	Date	Event	Location	Reign	Days	Defenses	Notes	Ref.
Dream Star Fighting Marigold and Pro Wrestling Noah
1	Kouki Amarei	November 11, 2024	Noah Monday Magic Vol. 3	Tokyo, Japan	1	203	1	Won a 10-woman battle royal also involving Bozilla, Chigusa Nagayo, Great Sakuya, Miku Aono, Miyuki Takase, Nightshade, Sadie Gibbs, Takumi Iroha, Utami Hayashishita and Yuu to become the inaugural champion.	
2	Takumi Iroha	June 2, 2025	Noah Monday Magic Prime Time Season Ep. 2	Tokyo, Japan	1	215	4		
3	Mayu Iwatani	January 3, 2026	Marigold First Dream	Tokyo, Japan	1	135	3		
—	Vacated	May 18, 2026	Noah Monday Magic Inside Out Ep. 1	Tokyo, Japan	—	—	—	Iwatani relinquished the title after due to suffering a broken toe injury.	
4	Mirai	June 15, 2026	Noah Wrestle Magic	Tokyo, Japan	1	141+	1	Defeated Great Sakuya to win the vacant championship.	

== Combined reigns ==
As of November 3, 2026.

†	Indicates the current champion

Rank	Wrestler	No. of reigns	Combined defenses	Combined days
1	Takumi Iroha	1	4	215
2	Kouki Amarei	1	1	203
3	Mirai †	1	1	141+
4	Mayu Iwatani	1	3	135

== See also ==
- IWGP Women's Championship
- Marigold World Championship
