= Dream Star Fighting Marigold =

Women's professional wrestling promotion

Marigold Co., Ltd.
- Trade name: Dream Star Fighting Marigold
- Native name: マリーゴールド
- Romanized name: Marīgōrudo
- Industry: Professional wrestling
- Genre: Women's professional wrestling (Joshi puroresu)
- Founded: April 15, 2024; 2 years ago
- Founder: Rossy Ogawa
- Headquarters: Kōtō, Tokyo, Japan
- Products: Live events; Merchandise; Music; Pay-per-view; Publishing; Video on demand
- Services: Licensing
- Owner: Rossy Ogawa
- Website: dsf-marigold.com

Dream Star Fighting Marigold (stylized as Dream Star★Fighting Marigold), referred to simply as Marigold (マリーゴールド, Marīgōrudo) in shorthand, is a Japanese joshi puroresu or women's professional wrestling promotion founded in April 2024.

== History ==
=== Formation ===
Marigold was founded by former All Japan Women's Pro-Wrestling co-producer and World Wonder Ring Stardom (Stardom) co-founder and promoter Rossy Ogawa, after Ogawa was fired from Stardom in February 2024. Ogawa was dismissed from Stardom after being accused by the promotion's management of "poaching talent" for what would be Marigold, he later denied this claim.

Upon the announcement of the creation of the promotion, several active members of the Stardom and Actwres girl'Z (AWG) rosters defected to Marigold. Amongst them were Stardom roster members Giulia, Utami Hayashishita, Mirai, Nanae Takahashi, Mai Sakurai, Victoria Yuzuki, and freelancer Nao Ishikawa, as well as AWG roster members Natsumi Sumikawa, Miku Aono, Misa Matsui, Chiaki, Chika Goto, and Kouki. Ogawa named his new promotion after Aimyon's song titled "Marigold", as it contains the message that "Marigolds are often associated with the powerful strength of the sun, and represent the power, strength, and light that resides within people". It was also reported that Marigold would have a working relationship with WWE.

=== 2024–present ===
Marigold hosted their inaugural event, titled "Marigold Fields Forever", on May 20, 2024, at Korakuen Hall in Tokyo. The show, and subsequent shows, were announced as streaming on Wrestle Universe. On July 13, at Summer Destiny, Marigold crowned three inaugural champions: Miku Aono won the United National Championship and Natsumi Showzuki won the Super Fly Championship, both determined in a four-woman single-elimination tournament. At the main event of the show, Sareee became the inaugural World Champion by defeating Giulia. The event also saw WWE's Iyo Sky defeating Utami Hayashishita.

== Championships ==
As of November 17, 2026

On May 15, 2024, the promotion announced the creation of four titles, the World, United National, Twin Star and Super Fly Championships alongside the design of the first two of them which, similar to World Wonder Ring Stardom's World and Wonder championships, were bound to continue the "Showa" era tradition carried on from All Japan Women's Pro-Wrestling with a red strap for the main title and a white strap for the secondary one. Additional to the main singles and tag team championships, the Super Fly Championship was introduced as a cruiserweight-type of title made for wrestlers under 121 lbs (55 kg).

=== Main ===
Championship	Current champion(s)	Reign	Date won	Days held	Location	Notes	Ref
Marigold World Championship	Mayu Iwatani	1	October 24, 2026	24+	Tokyo, Japan	Defeated Miku Aono (World) and Victoria Yuzuki (United National) in a winner takes all match at Grand Destiny.	
Marigold United National Championship	Mayu Iwatani	1	October 24, 2026	24+	Tokyo, Japan	Defeated Miku Aono (World) and Victoria Yuzuki (United National) in a winner takes all match at Grand Destiny.	
Marigold Twin Star Championship	tWin toWer (Kouki Amarei and Chika Goto)	1	May 23, 2026	178+	Tokyo, Japan	Defeated Darkness Revolution (Misa Matsui and Chiaki) at Shine Forever.	
Marigold Super Fly Championship	Mayu Iwatani	1	May 24, 2025	542+	Tokyo, Japan	Defeated Victoria Yuzuki at Shine Forever.	
Marigold 3D Trios Championship	Darkness Revolution (Chiaki, Misa Matsui and Rea Seto)	1	August 9, 2026	100+	Tokyo, Japan	Defeated La Vie en Rose (Mai Sakurai, Natsumi Showzuki, and Erina Yamanaka) at Summer Destiny.	

=== Shared ===
Championship	Current champion(s)	Reign	Date won	Days held	Successful defenses	Location	Notes	Ref.
GHC Women's Championship	Mirai	1	June 15, 2026	155+	1	Tokyo, Japan	Defeated Great Sakuya to win the vacant championship	

=== Annual tournaments ===
Tournament	Latest winner(s)	Date won	Notes
Marigold Dream Star Grand Prix	Victoria Yuzuki	September 20, 2026	Round-robin tournament with a head-to-head single final match.
Marigold Twin Star Cup	Seri Yamaoka and Shinno	December 27, 2025	Round-robin tournament with a head-to-head tag final match.
Marigold Rookie of Year	Seri Yamaoka	December 31, 2025	Single-elimination tournament for a group of inexperienced wrestlers.

== Major events ==
=== 2024 ===
Event	Date	Location	Venue	Main event	Notes
Fields Forever	May 20, 2024	Tokyo, Japan	Korakuen Hall	Giulia and Utami Hayashishita vs. Sareee and Bozilla	
Summer Destiny	July 13, 2024	Tokyo, Japan	Ryogoku Kokugikan	Giulia vs. Sareee for the inaugural Marigold World Championship	
Summer Gold Shine	August 19, 2024	Tokyo, Japan	Korakuen Hall	Giulia vs. Mai Sakurai	
Dream Star Grand Prix	August 31 – September 28, 2024	Various	Various	Utami Hayashishita vs. Mai Sakurai in the Dream Star Grand Prix final	
Fantastic Adventure	October 7, 2024	Tokyo, Japan	Korakuen Hall	MiraiSaku (Mirai and Mai Sakurai) (c) vs. tWin toWer (Kouki Amarei and Chika Goto) for the Marigold Twin Star Championship	
Fantastic Adventure	October 24, 2024	Tokyo, Japan	Korakuen Hall	Sareee (c) vs. Bozilla for the Marigold World Championship	
Winter Wonderful Fight	November 14, 2024	Tokyo, Japan	Korakuen Hall	Sareee vs. Nao Ishikawa	
Winter Wonderful Fight	December 13, 2024	Tokyo, Japan	Korakuen Hall	Sareee (c) vs. Nanae Takahashi for the Marigold World Championship	

=== 2025 ===
Event	Date	Location	Venue	Main event	Notes
First Dream	January 3, 2025	Tokyo, Japan	Ota City General Gymnasium	Sareee (c) vs Utami Hayashishita for the Marigold World Championship	
New Year's Golden Garden	January 13, 2025	Nagoya, Japan	Nagoya Chunichi Hall	Utami Hayashishita (c) vs. Tank for the Marigold World Championship	
New Year's Golden Garden	January 19, 2025	Tokyo, Japan	Korakuen Hall	Bozilla and Tank (c) vs. Nanae Takahashi and Seri Yamaoka for the Marigold Twin Star Championship	
New Year's Golden Garden	February 20, 2025	Tokyo, Japan	Korakuen Hall	Nanae Takahashi and Seri Yamaoka (c) vs. Utami Hayashishita and Victoria Yuzuki for the Marigold Twin Star Championship	
Spring Victory Series	March 30, 2025	Tokyo, Japan	Korakuen Hall	Utami Hayashishita (c) vs. Bozilla for the Marigold World Championship	
Shine Forever	May 24, 2025	Tokyo, Japan	Yoyogi National Gymnasium	Nanae Takahashi vs. Miku Aono	
Burning Desire	July 16, 2025	Tokyo, Japan	Korakuen Hall	Utami Hayashishita (World) vs. Takumi Iroha (GHC) in a Winner takes all match for the Marigold World Championship and GHC Women's Championship	
Dream Star Grand Prix	August 2 – September 14, 2025	Various	Various	Miku Aono vs. Victoria Yuzuki in the Dream Star Grand Prix final	
Grand Destiny	October 26, 2025	Tokyo, Japan	Ryogoku Kokugikan	Mayu Iwatani vs. Iyo Sky	

=== 2026 ===
Event	Date	Location	Venue	Main event	Notes
First Dream	January 3, 2026	Tokyo, Japan	Ota City General Gymnasium	Miku Aono (c) vs Mai Sakurai for the Marigold World Championship	
New Year's Golden Garden	January 24, 2026	Tokyo, Japan	Korakuen Hall	Mayu Iwatani (c) vs. Utami Hayashishita for the GHC Women's Championship	
Shine Forever	May 23, 2026	Tokyo, Japan	Ota City General Gymnasium	Miku Aono, Mai Sakurai and Mirai vs. Utami Hayashishita, Takumi Iroha and Maddy Morgan	
Summer Destiny	August 9, 2026	Tokyo, Japan	Ota City General Gymnasium	Miku Aono (c) vs. Nagisa Nozaki for the Marigold World Championship	
Dream Star Grand Prix	August 28 – September 20, 2026	Various	Various	Victoria Yuzuki vs. Rea Seto in the Dream Star Grand Prix final	
Grand Destiny	October 24, 2026	Tokyo, Japan	Ryogoku Kokugikan	Miku Aono (World) vs. Victoria Yuzuki (United National) vs. Mayu Iwatani (Super Fly) in a winner takes all match for the Marigold World Championship, Marigold United National Championship, and Marigold Super Fly Championship	

=== Upcoming ===
Event	Date	Location	Venue	Main event	Notes
First Dream	January 3, 2027	Tokyo, Japan	Ota City General Gymnasium	Mayu Iwatani (c) vs Miku Aono for the Marigold World Championship	
Shine Forever	May 22, 2027	Tokyo, Japan	Ota City General Gymnasium		
Summer Destiny	August 21, 2027	Tokyo, Japan	Ota City General Gymnasium		

== See also ==
- ARSION
