= Marigold United National Championship =

Professional wrestling women's championship

- Current title design (2024–present)

Details
- Promotion: Dream Star Fighting Marigold
- Date established: May 15, 2024
- Current champion: Mayu Iwatani
- Date won: October 24, 2026
Statistics
- First champion: Miku Aono
- Longest reign: Victoria Yuzuki (363 days)
- Shortest reign: Miku Aono (174 days)
- Oldest champion: Mai Sakurai (34 years, 3 months and 20 days)
- Youngest champion: Victoria Yuzuki (20 years, 8 months and 25 days)
- Heaviest champion: Victoria Yuzuki (123 lbs)
- Lightest champion: Mayu Iwatani (116 lbs)

The Marigold United National Championship (Japanese: マリーゴールド・ユナイテッド・ナショナル王座, Hepburn: Marīgōrudo Yunaiteddo Nashonaru Ōza) is a women's professional wrestling championship owned by the Dream Star Fighting Marigold promotion. The title, which in Marigold's championship hierarchy is situated as the secondary title behind the Marigold World Championship, was introduced on May 15, 2024.

== History ==
On April 15, 2024, Dream Star Fighting Marigold was established. On May 15, Marigold revealed the Marigold United National Championship belt. The title, which is also referred to simply as the "White Belt", is an homage to the NWA United National title first worn in Japan by Antonio Inoki, which was later held by the likes of Seiji Sakaguchi, Jumbo Tsuruta and Genichiro Tenryu. On June 16, a four-way tournament was launched to determine the inaugural champion. On July 13, at Summer Destiny, Miku Aono became the inaugural champion by defeating Bozilla in the finals.

=== Inaugural tournament (2024) ===
Semifinals
Bozilla	7:32
Nagisa Nozaki	Pin
Miku Aono	Pin
Mirai	24:14

Finals
Bozilla	10:13
Miku Aono	Pin

== Reigns ==
As of November 17, 2026, there have been a total of four reigns shared between four different wrestlers. The current champion is Mayu Iwatani who is in her first reign. She won the title by defeating Victoria Yuzuki and Miku Aono in a winner takes all match at Grand Destiny on October 24, 2026, in Tokyo, Japan.

Key
No.	Overall reign number
Reign	Reign number for the specific champion
Days	Number of days held
Defenses	Number of successful defenses
+	Current reign is changing daily

No.	Champion	Championship change			Reign statistics			Notes	Ref.
No.	Champion	Date	Event	Location	Reign	Days	Defenses	Notes	Ref.
1	Miku Aono	July 13, 2024	Summer Destiny	Tokyo, Japan	1	174	3	Defeated Bozilla in the finals of a four-woman single-elimination tournament to become the inaugural champion.	
2	Mai Sakurai	January 3, 2025	First Dream	Tokyo, Japan	1	296	6		
3	Victoria Yuzuki	October 26, 2025	Grand Destiny	Tokyo, Japan	1	363	5		
4	Mayu Iwatani	October 24, 2026	Grand Destiny	Tokyo, Japan	1	24+	0	This was a triple threat winner takes all match in which Aono’s Marigold World Championship and Iwatani’s Marigold Super Fly Championship was also on the line.	

== See also ==
- All Pacific Championship
- Wonder of Stardom Championship
