= Misa Matsui =

Japanese professional wrestler

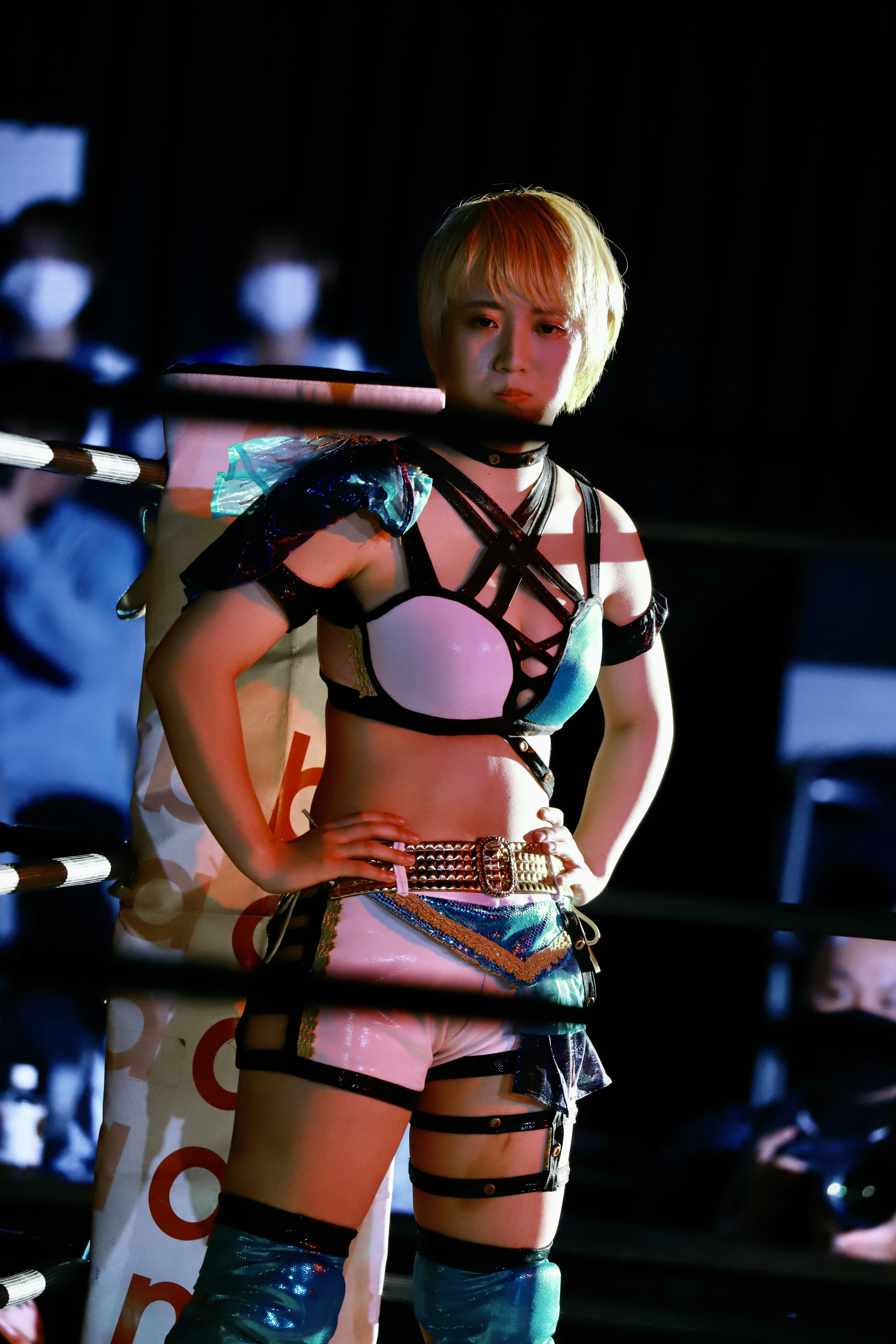
- Matsui in September 2020

Personal information
- Born: 17 May 2000 (age 26) Kawasaki, Japan

Professional wrestling career
- Ring name: Misa Matsui
- Billed height: 157 cm (5 ft 2 in)
- Billed weight: 51 kg (112 lb)
- Debut: 2018

Misa Matsui (松井珠紗, Matsui Misa) is a Japanese professional wrestler, currently signed to Dream Star Fighting Marigold where she is a part of Darkness Revolution and former Marigold Twin Star Champion. She is previously known for her tenure with the Japanese promotion Actwres girl'Z (AWG) and several brief others from the Japanese independent scene such as Pro Wrestling Wave, Seadlinnng and Oz Academy.

== Professional wrestling career ==
=== Actwres girl'Z (2018–2024) ===
Matsui made her professional wrestling debut in Actwres girl'Z, at AgZ Actwres girl'Z In Korakuen, a house show promoted on 15 November 2018, where she fell short to Yumiko Hotta, Yuko Sakurai and Ayumi Hayashi in a four-way match. During her six-year tenure with the promotion, she chased for various titles. At AWG Act In Osaka on 13 December 2020, Matsui teamed up with Michiko Miyagi in a losing effort against Hikari Shimizu and Saki in the second rounds of the inaugural AWG Tag Team Championship tournament after previously defeating Sakuran Bonita and Waka Tsukiyama in the first rounds on 24 November 2020. At AWG ACTwrestling Step 33 on 25 February 2024, Matsui unsuccessfully challenged Mari for the AWG Single Championship.

Besides title matches, Matsui also competed in various other regular kinds of bouts. At AWG Act 45 on 8 January 2020, she wrestled in a battle royal won by Rina Amikura and also involving other notable opponents of the roster such as Himeka Arita, Momo Kohgo, Tae Honma, Miyuki Takase and others. During her time in AWG, Matsui was part of the "Teppen" stable for roughly one year. At AWG ACTwrestling Step 28 New Year Special, she competed in a captain's fall tag team match in which she teamed up with stablemates Asahi, Cat Mask Calico and Naho Yamada as the captain in a losing effort against Update Plus (Kanamic, Mii, Nagisa Shiotsuki and Sakura Mizushima).

==== Japanese independent circuit (2018–present) ====
Matsui often made sporadic appearances for several promotions from the Japanese independent scene as developmental talent sent by AWG. At WAVE Thanksgiving WAVE 2019, an event promoted by Pro Wrestling Wave on 29 December 2019, Matsui defeated Ayumi Hayashi and Hibiki in three-way competition. At SEAdLINNNG Delivered To You!, an event promoted by Seadlinnng on 13 June 2020, she competed in a battle royal won by Yoshiko and also involving Hiroyo Matsumoto, Itsuki Aoki, Honori Hana, Kaho Kobayashi, Makoto, Miyuki Takase, Ryo Mizunami and Yuu. At OZ Academy Sanctuary, an event promoted by Oz Academy on 28 March 2021, Matsui unsuccessfully challenged Kaori Yoneyama for the Pure-J Openweight Championship.

On the first night of the AJPW New Year Giant Series 2024 from 2 January, Matsui teamed up with Natsumi Sumikawa to defeat Miku Aono and The Great Asako.

=== Dream Star Fighting Marigold (2024–present) ===
On 15 April 2024, Matsui was announced as part of the newly created promotion of Dream Star Fighting Marigold. At the inaugural event, Marigold Fields Forever on 20 May 2024, she teamed up with Natsumi Showzuki and lost to Kouki Amarei and Chika Goto. At Marigold Summer Destiny on 13 July 2024, she was defeated by Showzuki in the finals of a tournament to crown the inaugural Marigold Super Fly Champion.

On 7 February 2025, Matsui lost a Super Fly Championship match to champion Victoria Yuzuki. After the match, Matsui was recruited to Dark Wolf Army by Nagisa Nozaki and CHIAKI. Matsui officially joined the group during a press conference on 13 February, turning heel in the process. On 16 February, Bozilla and Megaton would join and the unit changed their name to Darkness Revolution, the first faction in Marigold history.

On 25 October 2025, Matsui and CHIAKI defeated Maria and Riko Kawahata for the Twin Star Championship at Grand Destiny, giving Matsui her first career championship.

== Championships and accomplishments ==
- Pro Wrestling Illustrated
  - Ranked No. 141 of the top 250 female wrestlers in the PWI Women's 250 in 2025
- Dream Star Fighting Marigold
  - Marigold Twin Star Championship (1 time) – with CHIAKI (1)
  - Marigold 3D Trios Championship (1 time, current) – with Chiaki and Rea Seto
  - Dream★Star GP Award (1 time)
    - Technique Award (2025)
  - Marigold Year-End Award (1 time)
    - Best Tag Team Award (2025) – with CHIAKI
