= Mai Sakurai =

Japanese professional wrestler

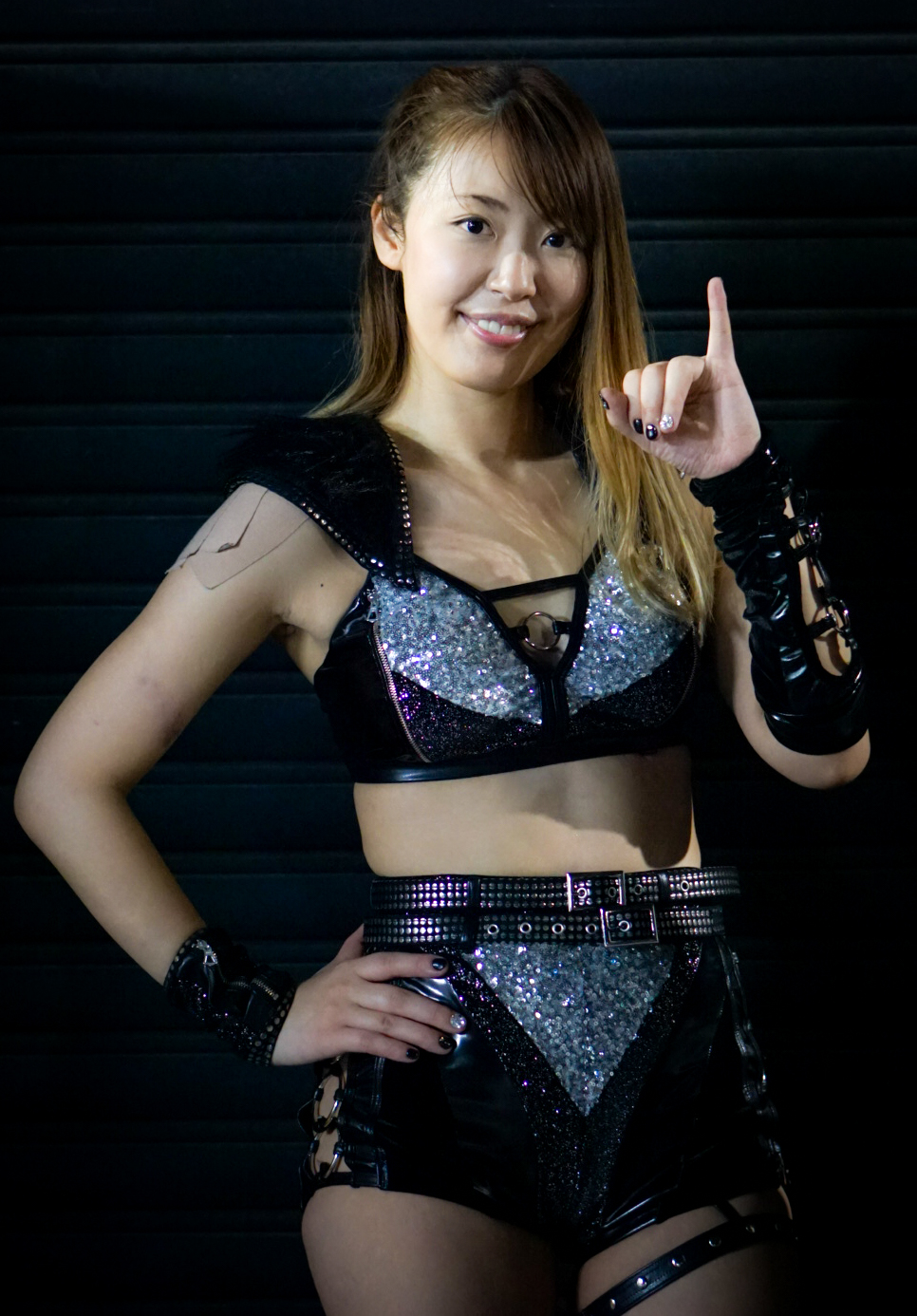
- Sakurai in April 2021

Personal information
- Born: September 14, 1990 (age 36) Chiba, Japan

Professional wrestling career
- Ring name: Mai Sakurai
- Billed height: 164 cm (5 ft 5 in)
- Billed weight: 55 kg (121 lb)
- Trained by: Giulia
- Debut: February 11, 2020

Mai Sakurai (桜井 まい, Sakurai Mai; born September 14, 1990) is a Japanese professional wrestler. She is best known for her tenures with World Wonder Ring Stardom and Dream Star Fighting Marigold.

== Professional wrestling career ==
=== Actwres girl'Z (2020–2021) ===
Sakurai made her professional wrestling debut at an Actwres girl'Z show on February 11, 2020, where she lost to Miku Aono.

=== World Wonder Ring Stardom (2021–2024) ===
==== Cosmic Angels (2021-2022) ====
Sakurai made her debut in World Wonder Ring Stardom on August 13, 2021, when she unsuccessfully challenged Unagi Sayaka for the Future of Stardom Championship. After the match, Sakurai was presented as the newest member of Cosmic Angels and was announced to undergo a newcomer challenge against ten opponents. At Osaka Dream Cinderella on October 9, Sakurai teamed up with Mina Shirakawa in a losing effort against Rin Kadokura and Maria. Due to Unagi Sayaka and Mina Shirakawa feeling underappreciated by the leader Tam Nakano and doubting Sakurai and Waka Tsukiyama, tensions were raised within Cosmic Angels throughout November, which led to inner-stable clashes. At Kawasaki Super Wars on November 3, Sakurai defeated Waka Tsukiyama in a match in which had Sakurai would have to leave Cosmic Angels if she lost. At Tokyo Super Wars on November 27, Sakurai unsuccessfully challenged Ruaka and Waka Tsukiyama in a three-way match for the Future of Stardom Championship. Sakurai competed in the 2021 Goddesses of Stardom Tag League, where she teamed up with Unagi Sayaka and scored a total of four points. At Dream Queendom on December 29, Sakurai teamed up with Mina Shirakawa and Unagi Sayaka to unsuccessfully challenge MaiHimePoi in a six-woman tag team match for the Artist of Stardom Championship.

==== Donna Del Mondo (2022-2024) ====
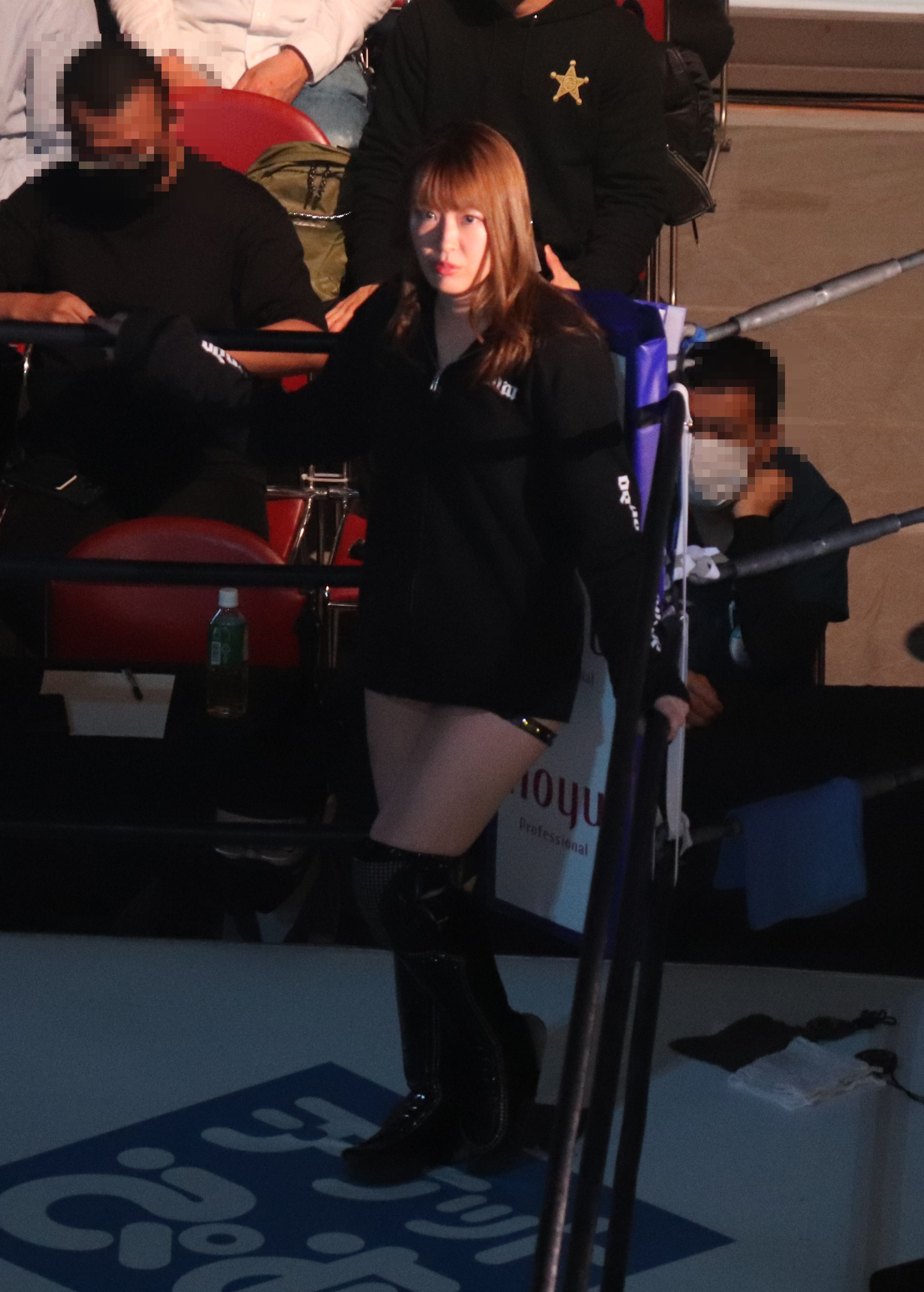
Sakurai on the second night of the Stardom World Climax 2022 on March 27

After teaming up with her Cosmic Angels stablemates, Tam Nakano and Unagi Sayaka, in a losing effort against Donna Del Mondo (Giulia, Thekla and Mirai) on February 12, 2022, Sakurai decided to leave Cosmic Angels and join Donna Del Mondo, stating that she wanted to wrestle instead of just dancing. On May 27, 2023, at Flashing Champions 2023, Sakurai, Giulia and Thekla, together known as the Baribari Bombers, defeated REStart to win the Artist of Stardom Championship. At New Years Stars 2024 on January 3, 2024, Baribari Bombers participated in the 2024 Triangle Derby. After reaching the finals and deciding to defend the Artist of Stardom Championship, they lost the match and titles to Abarenbo GE.

=== Dream Star Fighting Marigold (2024–2026) ===
On April 15, 2024, former Stardom executive producer Rossy Ogawa, held a press conference to announce his new promotion Dream Star Fighting Marigold, with Sakurai being one of the initial roster members. On May 20, during Marigold's first event Fields Forever, Sakurai teamed with Zayda Steel to face Nagisa Nozaki and Myla Grace in a match that ended in a time limit draw. On July 30, Sakurai and MIRAI defeated Miku Aono and Natsumi Showzuki to become the inaugural Marigold Twin Star Champions. On September 28, Sakurai won the Star League of the inaugural Dream★Star GP, before losing in the finals to Utami Hayashishita. On December 13, at Winter Wonderful Fight, Sakurai and MIRAI lost the Twin Star Championship to Dark Wolf Army (Nagisa Nozaki and Chiaki), ending their reign at 174 days.

On January 3, 2025, at First Dream, Sakurai defeated Miku Aono to win the Marigold United National Championship. Sakurai would hold the championship for 296 days, and defend it successfully six times. On October 26, 2025, Sakurai lost the United National Championship to Victoria Yuzuki at Grand Destiny. On January 3, 2026, at First Dream, Sakurai faced Miku Aono for the Marigold World Championship, in a losing effort. On October 3, Sakurai announced that she would be departing Marigold and taking an extended hiatus from professional wrestling to heal lingering physical injuries—including issues with her knees and neck from a cervical sprain—as well as stress-related health struggles; she wrestled her final match alongside her fellow La Vie en Rose stablemates Natsumi Showzuki and Erina Yamanaka in a winning effort against Chanyota, Diana Strong and Mila Smidt.

== Championships and accomplishments ==
- Dream Star Fighting Marigold
  - Marigold United National Championship (1 time)
  - Marigold 3D Trios Championship (1 time, inaugural) – with Natsumi Showzuki and Erina Yamanaka
  - Marigold Twin Star Championship (1 time, inaugural) – with MIRAI
  - Marigold Twin Star Championship Tournament (2024) – with MIRAI
  - Marigold Year-End Award (2 times)
    - Best Tag Team Award (2024) – with MIRAI
    - Technique Award (2025)
  - Dream★Star GP Award (1 time)
    - Star League Best Match Award (2025) vs. MIRAI on August 30
- Pro Wrestling Illustrated
  - Ranked No. 101 of the top 250 female wrestlers in the PWI Women's 250 in 2025
- World Wonder Ring Stardom
  - Artist of Stardom Championship (1 time) – with Giulia and Thekla
