= Chiaki (wrestler) =

Japanese professional wrestler

Personal information
- Born: 8 November 1994 (age 31) Tokyo, Japan

Professional wrestling career
- Ring name: Muscle Chiaki Chiaki
- Billed height: 160 cm (5 ft 3 in)
- Billed weight: 60 kg (132 lb)
- Debut: 2021

Chiaki Kanahama (金濱 千明, Kanahama Chiaki), better known mononymously by her ring name Chiaki (CHIAKI (プロレスラー), Chiaki), is a Japanese professional wrestler currently performing in the Japanese promotion Dream Star Fighting Marigold where she is a member of Darkness Revolution and former two-time Marigold Twin Star Champion. She is previously known for her short tenure with Actwres girl'Z.

== Professional wrestling career ==
=== Actwres girl'Z (2021–2024) ===
Kanahama made her professional wrestling debut at AWG Color's on November 20, 2021, where she teamed up with Miku Aono in a losing effort against Mari and Natsuki. At AWG ACTwrestling Step 19 on May 28, 2023, she unsuccessfully challenged Aono for the AWG Single Championship. She wrestled her last match in the promotion on April 14, 2024, at AWG ACTwrestling Step 39 where she teamed up with "Beastz Rebellion" stablemate Act in a three-way tag team match won by Teppen (Misa Matsui and Naho Yamada) and also involving Update Plus (Asako Mia and Mii).

=== Dream Star Fighting Marigold (2024–present) ===
In April 2024, CHIAKI was announced as part of the newly created promotion of Dream Star Fighting Marigold. On May 20, 2024, at Marigold's inaugural event Fields Forever, she lost to MIRAI. On July 13, at Marigold Summer Destiny, CHIAKI and Nagisa Nozaki defeated Myla Grace and Zayda Steel. CHIAKI and Nozaki, under the team name Dark Wolf Army, competed in the inaugural tournament for the Marigold Twin Star Championship. Dark Wolf Army defeated Rea Seto and Komomo Minami in the first round, then lost to MiraiSaku (MIRAI and Mai Sakurai) in the second round.

On December 13, 2024, Dark Wolf Army defeated MiraiSaku to win the Twin Star Championship. On December 26, Dark Wolf Army made their first successful defense against Bozilla and Myla Grace. On January 3, 2025, at First Dream, Dark Wolf Army lost the titles to Bozilla and Tank. On February 7, 2025, CHIAKi and Nozaki would atteampt to recruit Misa Matsui to Dark Wolf Army. Matsui would officially join the group during a press conference on February 13. On February 16, Bozilla and Megaton would join and the unit changed their name to Darkness Revolution, the first faction in Marigold history.

On October 25, 2025, at Grand Destiny, CHIAKI and Matsui defeated Maria and Riko Kawahata for the Twin Star Championship, making CHIAKI the first two-time champion in Marigold history.

== Championships and accomplishments ==
- Dream Star Fighting Marigold
  - Marigold Twin Star Championship (2 times) – with Nagisa Nozaki (1) and Misa Matsui (1)
  - Marigold 3D Trios Championship (1 time, current) – with Misa Matsui and Rea Seto
  - Marigold Year-End Award (1 time)
    - Best Tag Team Award (2025) – with Misa Matsui
