= Komomo Minami =

Japanese professional wrestler

Personal information
- Born: 10 March 2003 (age 23) Fukuoka, Japan

Professional wrestling career
- Ring name: Komomo Minami
- Billed height: 153 cm (5 ft 0 in)
- Billed weight: 50 kg (110 lb)
- Trained by: Mirai Maiumi; Mayu Iwatani; Miku Aono
- Debut: 2024

Komomo Minami (南小桃, Minami Komomo) is a Japanese professional wrestler currently performing in the Japanese promotion Dream Star Fighting Marigold.

== Professional wrestling career ==
=== World Wonder Ring Stardom ===
Minami was originally supposed to debut with Stardom on March 25, 2023 against Hazuki, but left the company before making her debut.

=== Dream Star Fighting Marigold ===
Minami was introduced as one of trainees under Dream Star Fighting Marigold, on May 1, 2024.

Minami made her professional wrestling debut at a Dream Star Fighting Marigold show on June 11, where she lost to Mirai.

On October 14, Minami took first win on her own, defeating Minami Yuuki.
