= Shinno (wrestler) =

Japanese professional wrestler

Personal information
- Born: December 5, 2008 (age 17) Yamaguchi Prefecture, Japan
- Family: Michiko Omukai (mother)

Professional wrestling career
- Ring name: Shinno
- Billed height: 163 cm (5 ft 4 in)
- Billed weight: 48 kg (106 lb)
- Debut: 2025

Shinno (心希) (born December 5, 2008) is a Japanese professional wrestler. She is currently signed to Dream Star Fighting Marigold.

== Professional wrestling career ==
=== Dream Star Fighting Marigold (2024–present) ===
On July 13, 2024, it was announced that Shinno joined Dream Star Fighting Marigold as a trainee.

On May 4, 2025, Shinno appealed directly to Mai Sakurai and it was decided that Sakurai would serve as opponent in Shinno's debut match.

Shinno made her official in-ring debut at Marigold Shine Forever 2025 on May 24, 2025, where she was defeated by Sakurai.

== Championships and accomplishments ==
- Dream Star Fighting Marigold
  - Twin Star Cup (2025) - with Seri Yamaoka
