= Marigold World Championship =

Professional wrestling women's championship

- Current title design (2024–present)

Details
- Promotion: Dream Star Fighting Marigold
- Date established: May 15, 2024
- Current champion: Mayu Iwatani
- Date won: October 24, 2026
Statistics
- First champion: Sareee
- Longest reign: Miku Aono (363 days)
- Shortest reign: Sareee (174 days)
- Oldest champion: Miku Aono (35 years, 2 months and 5 days)
- Youngest champion: Utami Hayashishita (26 years, 3 months and 20 days)
- Heaviest champion: Utami Hayashishita (143 lbs)
- Lightest champion: Mayu Iwatani (116 lbs)

The Marigold World Championship (Japanese: マリーゴールド・ワールド王座, Hepburn: Marīgōrudo Wārudo Ōza) is a women's professional wrestling world championship owned by the Dream Star Fighting Marigold promotion. The title, which is situated at the top of Marigold's championship hierarchy, was introduced on May 15, 2024.

== History ==
On April 15, 2024, Dream Star Fighting Marigold was established. On May 15, Marigold revealed the Marigold World Championship belt. The title will also be referred to simply as the "Red Belt", a name famously used by All Japan Women's Pro-Wrestling (AJW) to refer to its WWWA World Single Championship (of which Marigold's Nanae Takahashi had been the last titleholder back in 2006). On July 13, at the main event of Summer Destiny, Sareee defeated Giulia to become the inaugural champion.

== Reigns ==
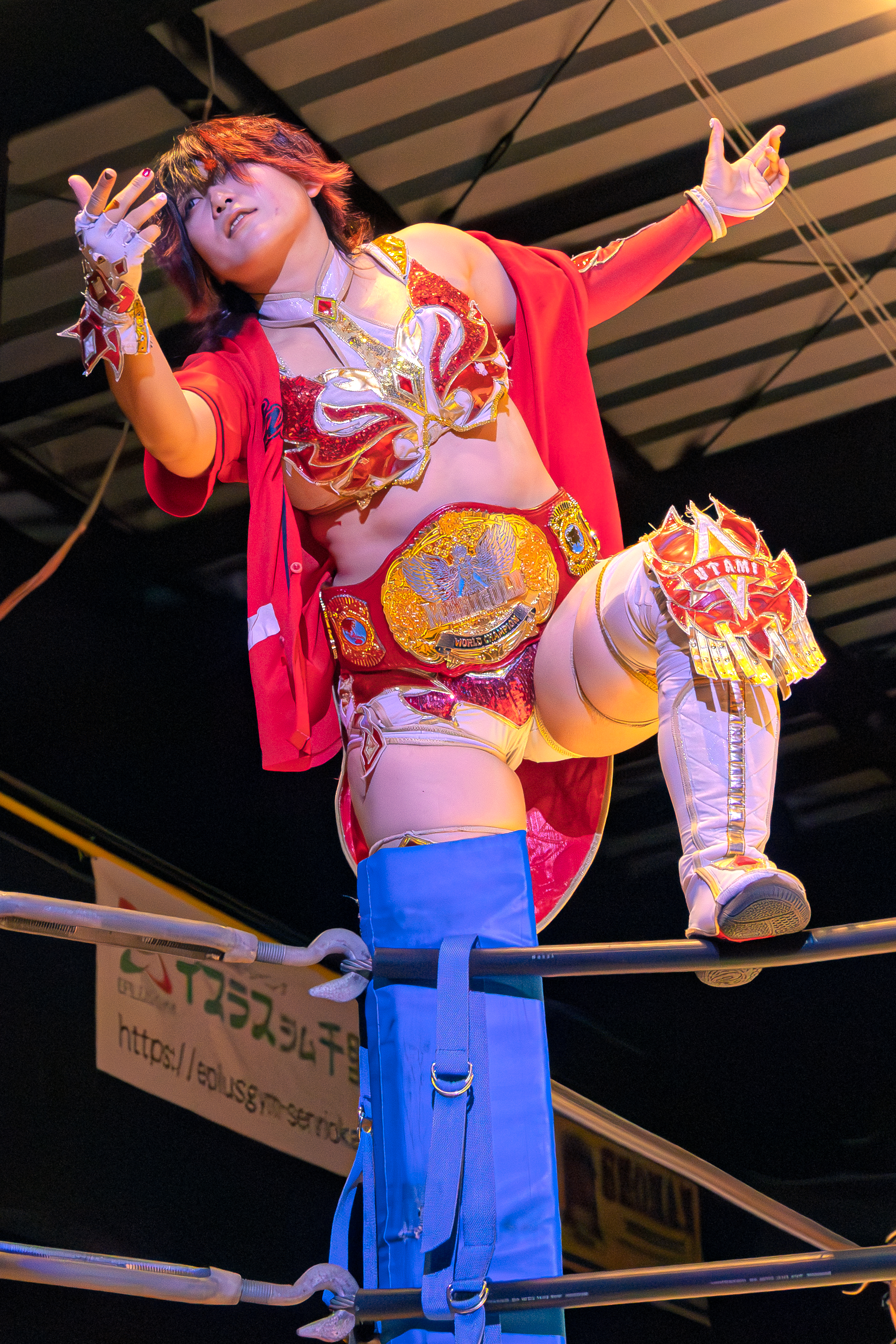
Utami Hayashishita shown here with the current design of the title.

As of November 17, 2026, there have been a total of four reigns shared between four different titleholders. The current champion is Mayu Iwatani who is in her first reign. She won the title by defeating Miku Aono and Victoria Yuzuki in a winner takes all match at Grand Destiny on October 24, 2026, in Tokyo, Japan.

Key
No.	Overall reign number
Reign	Reign number for the specific champion
Days	Number of days held
Defenses	Number of successful defenses
+	Current reign is changing daily

No.	Champion	Championship change			Reign statistics			Notes	Ref.
No.	Champion	Date	Event	Location	Reign	Days	Defenses	Notes	Ref.
1	Sareee	July 13, 2024	Summer Destiny	Tokyo, Japan	1	174	2	Defeated Giulia to become the inaugural champion.	
2	Utami Hayashishita	January 3, 2025	First Dream	Tokyo, Japan	1	296	4		
3	Miku Aono	October 26, 2025	Grand Destiny	Tokyo, Japan	1	363	6		
4	Mayu Iwatani	October 24, 2026	Grand Destiny	Tokyo, Japan	1	24+	0	This was a triple threat winner takes all match in which Yuzuki’s Marigold United National Championship and Iwatani’s Marigold Super Fly Championship was also on the line.	

== See also ==
- World Women's Championship (disambiguation)
- World of Stardom Championship
