= Victoria Yuzuki =

Japanese professional wrestler (born 2005)

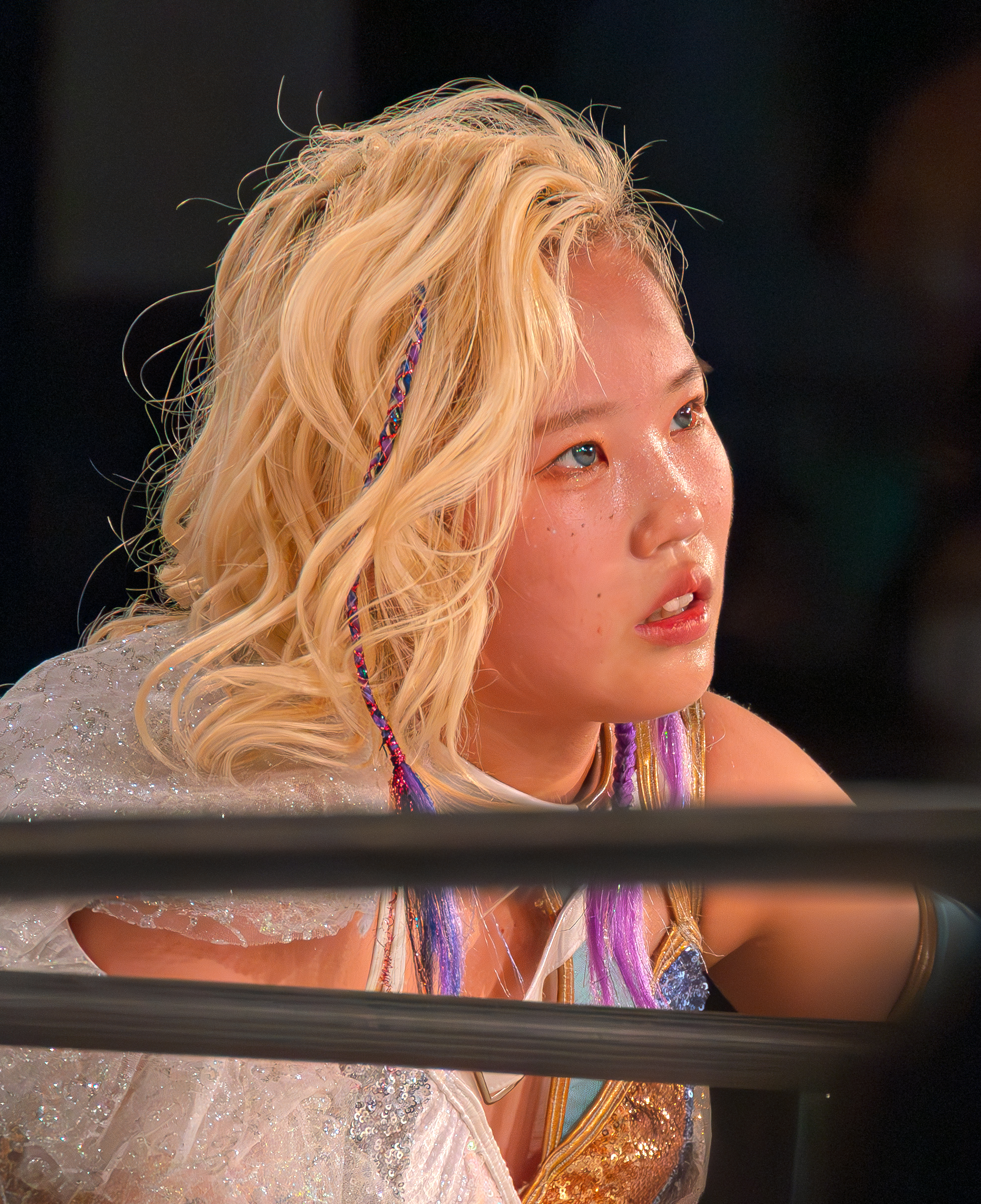
- Yuzuki in April 2025

Personal information
- Born: February 1, 2005 (age 21) Nagoya, Aichi Prefecture, Japan

Professional wrestling career
- Ring name: Victoria Yuzuki Yuzuki
- Billed height: 160 cm (5 ft 3 in)
- Billed weight: 56 kg (123 lb)
- Trained by: Milano Collection A. T. Mayu Iwatani
- Debut: 2023

Yuzuki Kokawa (born February 1, 2005) is a Japanese professional wrestler. She is signed to Dream Star Fighting Marigold under the ring name Victoria Yuzuki (ビクトリア弓月, Victoria Yuzuki) and is a former Marigold United National Champion. She is also known for her brief tenure with World Wonder Ring Stardom, where she is a former Stardom Rookie of the Year winner and a former member of Stars.

== Professional wrestling career ==
=== World Wonder Ring Stardom (2023–2024) ===
Yuzuki made her professional wrestling debut in World Wonder Ring Stardom at Stardom New Blood West 1 on November 17, 2023, where she fell short to Momo Watanabe in singles competition. At Stardom Nagoya Big Winter on December 2, 2023, she teamed up with Mina Shirakawa in a losing effort against Miyu Amasaki and Hanako. At Stardom New Blood 12 on December 25, 2023, Yuzuki teamed up with Hanako in a losing effort against Haruka Umesaki and Miyu Amasaki. At Stardom Dream Queendom 2023 on December 29, she teamed up with Amasaki and Azusa Inaba to defeat Hanako, Kurara Sayaka and Ranna Yagami.

At Stardom New Year Stars 2024 on January 3, Yuzuki won the reactivated Stardom Rookie of the Year tournament by defeating Ranna Yagami in the first rounds and Hanako in the second rounds. One night later at Ittenyon Stardom Gate on January 4, 2024, she teamed up with Hanako and Yagami to defeat Queen's Quest (Lady C and Hina) and Sayaka Kurara. At a house show from January 14, 2024, Yuzuki joined Stars after leader Mayu Iwatani accepted her request. At Stardom Supreme Fight 2024 on February 4, she unsuccessfully challenged Rina for the Future of Stardom Championship. On March 9, Yuzuki lost to Starlight Kid in the first round of the Cinderella Tournament. On March 31, Yuzuki would leave Stardom, alongside Giulia, Utami Hayashishita, MIRAI and Mai Sakurai.

=== Dream Star Fighting Marigold (2024–present) ===
On April 15, 2024, Yuzuki, now going by Victoria Yuzuki, was announced as part of the newly created promotion of Dream Star Fighting Marigold and was scheduled to participate in their inaugural event Marigold Fields Forever. She, along with Nanae Takahashi, participated in the very first match in Marigold's history, with Yuzuki losing.

On January 3, 2025, at First Dream, Yuzuki defeated Natsumi Showzuki to win the Marigold Super Fly Championship, making it the first title in Yuzuki's career. On May 24, 2025, Yuzuki lost the Super Fly Championship to her mentor Mayu Iwatani at Shine Forever. Yuzuki would go on to enter the second annual Dream Star Grand Prix, where she would win the Dream League before losing to Miku Aono in the finals. On October 26, 2025, Yuzuki defeated Mai Sakurai to win the United National Championship at Grand Destiny.

== Championships and accomplishments ==
- Dream Star Fighting Marigold
  - Marigold United National Championship (1 time)
  - Marigold Super Fly Championship (1 time)
  - Dream★Star GP (2026)
  - Dream★Star GP Award (2 times)
    - Technique Award (2024)
    - Dream League Best Match Award (2025) vs. Mayu Iwatani on September 14
  - Marigold Year-End Award (1 time)
    - Outstanding Performance Award (2025)
- Pro Wrestling Illustrated
  - Ranked No. 85 of the top 250 female wrestlers in the PWI Women's 250 in 2025
- World Wonder Ring Stardom
  - Stardom Rookie of the Year (2023)
