= Miku Aono =

Japanese professional wrestler

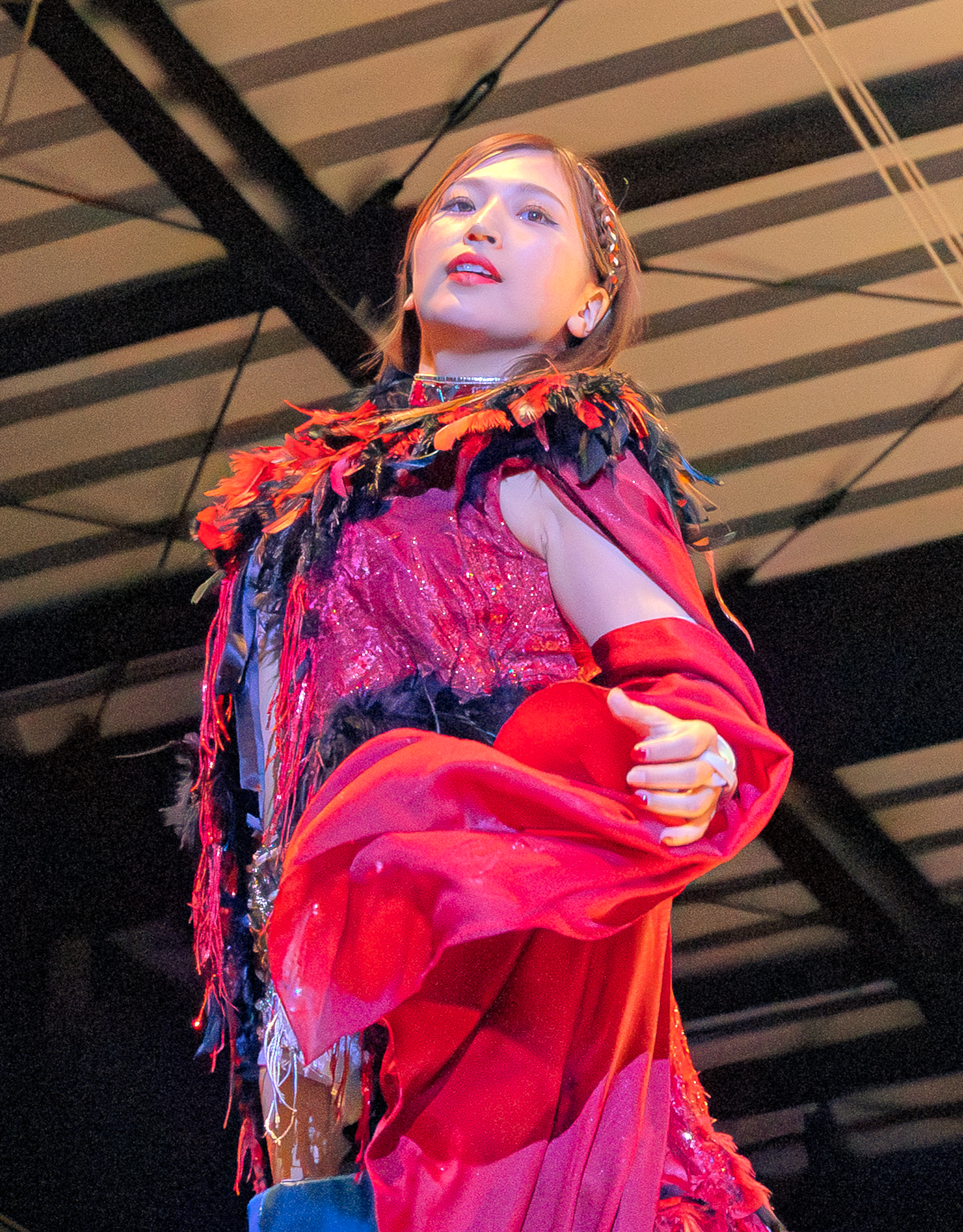
- Aono in September 2025

Personal information
- Born: August 21, 1990 (age 36) Kawagoe, Saitama Prefecture, Japan

Professional wrestling career
- Ring name(s): Mirai Aono; Miku Aono
- Billed height: 157 cm (5 ft 2 in)
- Billed weight: 54 kg (119 lb)
- Trained by: Nanae Takahashi
- Debut: 2017

Miku Aono (青野 未来, Aono Miku; born August 21, 1990) is a Japanese professional wrestler, actress and gravure idol. She is currently signed to Dream Star Fighting Marigold, where she is a former Marigold World Champion. She is also known for her time in Actwres girl'Z, where she is a former one-time AWG Single Champion.

== Professional wrestling career ==
=== Independent circuit (2017–present) ===
During her career, Aono often made freelance work by competing in various promotions from the Japanese independent scene. At 2AW Grand Slam In 2AW Square, an event promoted by Active Advance Pro Wrestling on March 28, 2021, she teamed up with Tae Honma and unsuccessfully challenged 3A (Ayame Sasamura and Rina Shingaki) for the World Woman Pro-Wrestling Diana Tag Team Championship. At DDT Ganbare Pro Home Alone, an event promoted by Ganbare Pro-Wrestling on December 25, 2021, Aono teamed up with Yuna Manase and Yuuri in a losing effort against harukaze, Misa Matsui and Moeka Haruhi. At Oz Academy I See The Light on December 30, 2021, she teamed up with Kakeru Sekiguchi and Misa Matsui in a losing effort against Ozaki-gun (Mayumi Ozaki, Saori Anou and Yumi Ohka).

=== Actwres girl'Z (2017–2024) ===
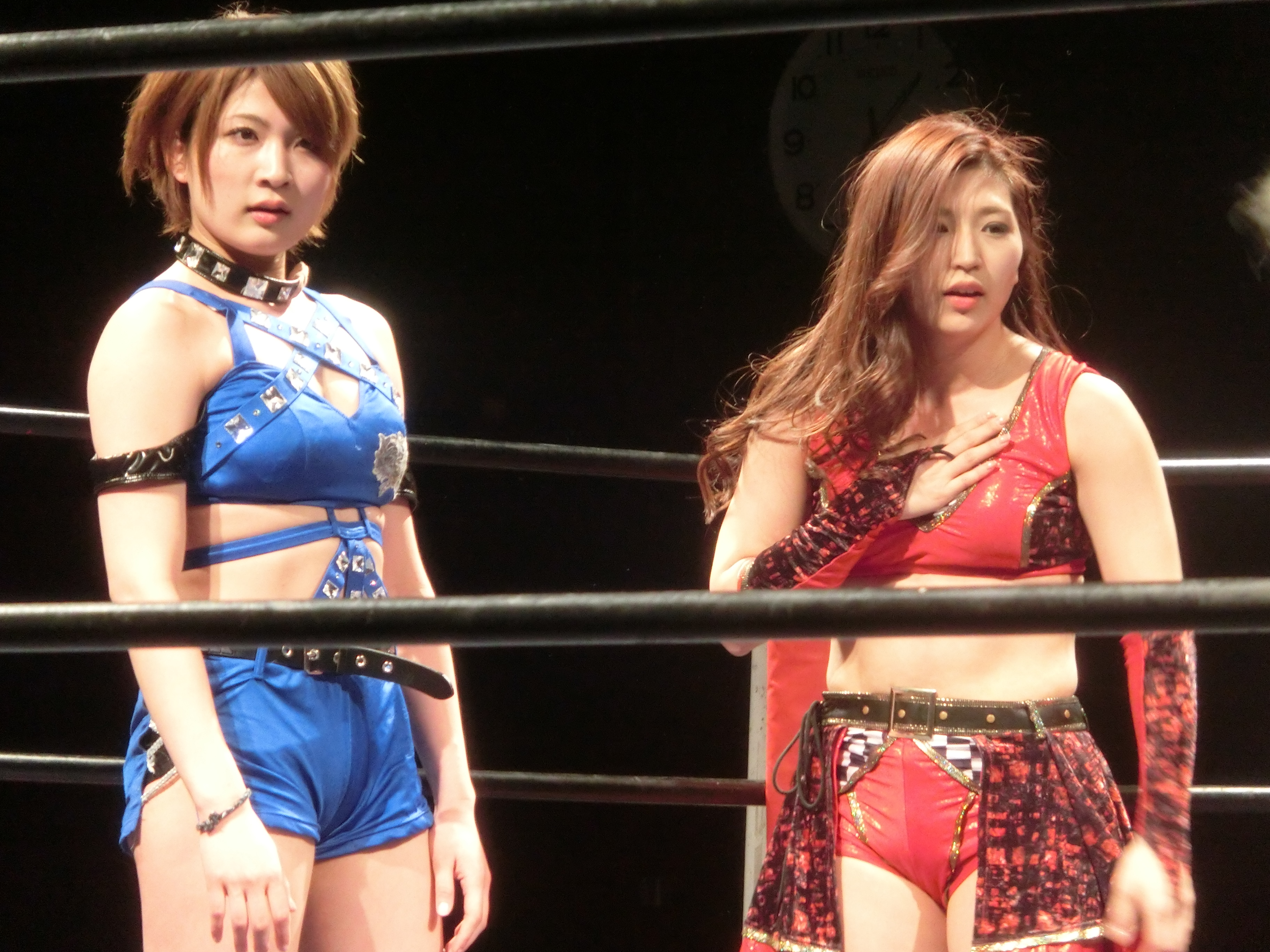
Aono alongside Saori Anou in February 2018

Aono is probably best known for her tenure with Actwres girl'Z, promotion in which she made her professional wrestling debut on June 25, 2017, at AgZ Act 21 where she fell short to Natsumi Maki in singles competition. During her time in the promotion, she has won two separate titles. First of them is the AWG Tag Team Championship which she won alongside Kakeru Sekiguchi at AWG Act In Korakuen Hall on August 13, 2021. The other one is the AWG Single Championship, the top title of the company which she won at AWG ACTwrestling in Korakuen Hall on March 12, 2023, by defeating Kouki in the finals of a tournament to win the reactivated title which was previously vacated due to Actwres girl'Z undergoing a rebranding process.

Being a homegrown talent of the promotion, Aono frequently took part in notable events such as the Korakuen Hall event from December 13, 2021, where she teamed up with Kakeru Sekiguchi and Maika Ozaki in a losing effort against Saki, Hikari Shimizu and Yuna Mizumori as a result of a six-woman tag team match. On December 29, 2023, Aono lost the AWG Single Championship to Mari, ending her reign at 292 days.

=== Ice Ribbon (2019–2022) ===
Another promotion in which Aono is known for competing in is Ice Ribbon. One of her first bouts in the promotion took place at RibbonMania 2019 on December 31, which was Tequila Saya's retirement match, a gauntlet match in which the latter put herself against 44 opponents. Some of the most notable were Aono herself alongside Hiroe Nagahama, Ken Ohka, Manami Toyota, Ram Kaicho, Tsukasa Fujimoto, Tsukushi, Hiragi Kurumi, Syuri, Matsuya Uno and many others. She took part into the 2nd Kizuna Tournament of August 29, 2020, event in which she teamed up with Mochi Miyagi and fell short to Akane Fujita and Asahi in the first rounds.

She eventually started chasing for various titles promoted by the company. At Ice Ribbon New Ice Ribbon #1142 on August 28, 2021, she teamed up with Nao Ishikawa to unsuccessfully challenge Azure Revolution (Maya Yukihi and Risa Sera) for the International Ribbon Tag Team Championship. At Ice Ribbon New Ice Ribbon #1152 on October 17, 2021, she unsuccessfully challenged Rina Shingaki and Satsuki Totoro in a three-way match for the Triangle Ribbon Championship.

=== Dream Star Fighting Marigold (2024–present) ===
Aono joined Dream Star Fighting Marigold with its establishment, and was victorious during Marigold's first show on May 20, 2024, as she defeated Nao Ishikawa. On June 16, Aono entered a four-woman single-elimination tournament to determine the inaugural Marigold United National Champion. Aono and MIRAI would fight to a time limit draw three different times in the first round of the tournament. On July 13, at Summer Destiny, Aono defeated MIRAI, and then Bozilla in the finals, to be crowned the first champion. On August 19, at Summer Gold Shine, Aono had her first successful title defense against Kouki Amarei. On January 3, 2025, Aono lost the United National Championship to Mai Sakurai at First Dream.

On May 24, 2025, Aono defeated Nanae Takahashi in Takahashi's retirement match at Shine Forever. On September 14, 2025, Aono defeated Victoria Yuzuki to win the second annual Dream★Star GP, granting her a Marigold World Championship match at Grand Destiny. At Grand Destiny on October 26, 2025, Aono defeated inaugural Dream★Star GP winner Utami Hayashishita for the Marigold World Championship, becoming the first wrestler in Marigold history to hold both the World and United National Championships.

== Championships and accomplishments ==
- Actwres girl'Z
  - AWG Single Championship (1 time)
  - AWG Tag Team Championship (1 time) – with Kakeru Sekiguchi
  - AWG Single Championship Tournament (2023)
- Dream Star Fighting Marigold
  - Marigold World Championship (1 time)
  - Marigold United National Championship (1 time, inaugural)
  - Dream★Star GP (2025)
  - Dream★Star GP Award (1 time)
    - Fighting Spirit Award (2024)
  - Marigold Year-End Award (2 times)
    - Technique Award (2024)
    - MVP Award (2025)
- Pro Wrestling Illustrated
  - Ranked No. 56 of the top 250 female wrestlers in the PWI Women's 250 in 2024

Achievements
Preceded by Utami Hayashishita	Dream Star Grand Prix winner 2025	Succeeded by Incumbent
