= Mirai Maiumi =

Japanese professional wrestler

Mirai
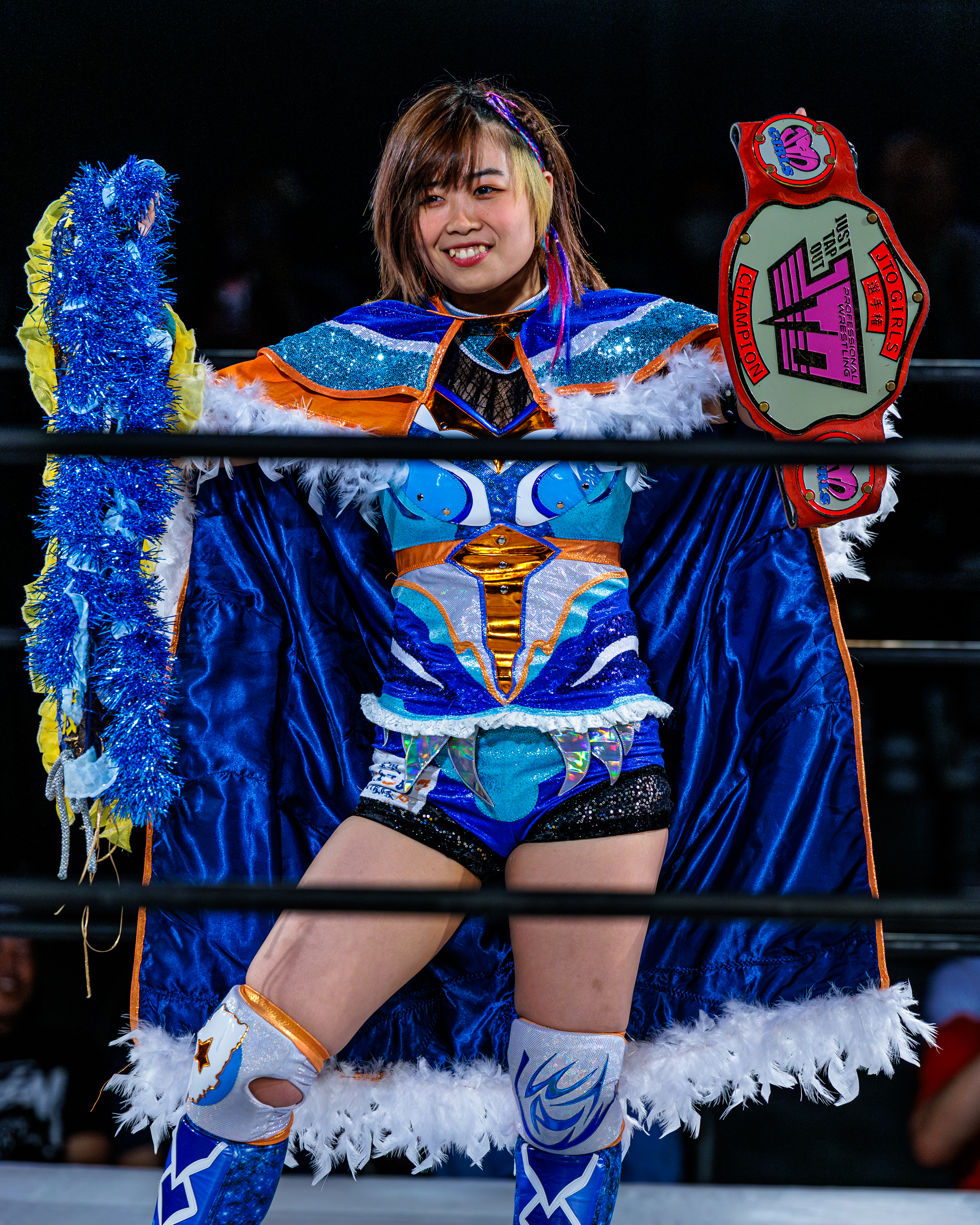
- Mirai in May 2026

Personal information
- Born: Mirai Ito; December 3, 1999 (age 26) Miyako, Iwate Prefecture, Japan

Professional wrestling career
- Ring names: Mirai; Mirai Maiumi
- Billed height: 163 cm (5 ft 4 in)
- Billed weight: 60 kg (132 lb)
- Trained by: Taka Michinoku
- Debut: 2019

Mirai Ito (伊藤充礼, Ito Mirai; born December 3, 1999) better known by her ring name Mirai Maiumi (舞海魅星, Maiumi Mirai), or simply Mirai (often stylized in capital letters as MIRAI), is a Japanese professional wrestler. She is signed to Michinoku Pro Wrestling. She is best known for her time in Dream Star Fighting Marigold, where she is a former Marigold Twin Star Champion, and World Wonder Ring Stardom, where she was a member of God's Eye.

Mirai joined Stardom in November 2021 and is a former one-time Goddesses of Stardom Champion (with Ami Sourei) and one-time Wonder of Stardom Champion. Mirai won the Cinderella Tournament back to back in 2022 and 2023, which made her the second to do so in the history of the tournament. She would then go on and join Dream Star Fighting Marigold, where she would become the inaugural Marigold Twin Star Champions with Mai Sakurai until leaving the company in October 2025.

== Professional wrestling career ==
=== DDT Pro-Wrestling (2019–2021) ===
Due to Tokyo Joshi Pro-Wrestling (TJPW) being the sister promotion of DDT Pro-Wrestling, Maiumi often competed in various of the latter's signature events. One of them is the DDT Ultimate Party branch of events, making her only appearance at Ultimate Party 2019 on November 3 where she teamed up with Raku, Pom Harajuku and Haruna Neko in a losing effort against Hikari Noa, Yumi, Mahiro Kiryu and Suzume. At Kawasaki Strong 2021 on February 14, she teamed up with Mao and Keigo Nakamura in a losing effort against Super Delfin and NEO Itoh Respect Army (Chris Brookes and Maki Itoh) as a result of a Six-person Tornado tag team match. At CyberFight Festival 2021, an event produced by DDT and TJPW in partnership with Pro Wrestling Noah on June 6, Maiumi teamed up with her "BeeStar" tag team partner Suzume, Haruna Neko, Arisu Endo and Moka Miyamoto to defeat Nao Kakuta, Raku, Pom Harajuku, Mahiro Kiryu and Kaya Toribami in a Ten-woman tag team match.

=== Tokyo Joshi Pro-Wrestling (2019–2021; 2026–present) ===
Maiumi made her professional wrestling debut at TJPW at Yes! Wonderland (Opportunity Is There), an event promoted on May 3, 2019, where she teamed up with Yumi in a losing effort against Bakuretsu Sisters (Nodoka Tenma and Yuki Aino). At TJPW 10 Vs. 10 - Red And White Winning Match on April 3, 2020, Maiumi teamed up with Haruna Neko, Hikari Noa, Mina Shirakawa, Miu Watanabe, Miyu Yamashita, Mizuki, Rika Tatsumi, Yuki Aino and Yuki Kamifuku as Team White to defeat Team Red (Hyper Misao, Mahiro Kiryu, Maki Itoh, Nodoka Tenma, Pom Harajuku, Raku, Sena Shiori, Shoko Nakajima, Suzume and Yuna Manase) in a twenty-woman tag team match. At TJPW Positive Chain on February 12, 2021, Maiumi unsuccessfully challenged Yuki Kamifuku for the International Princess Championship. At TJPW Yes! Wonderland 2021 on May 4, Maiumi teamed up with Suzume to unsuccessfully challenge NEO Biishiki-gun (Mei Saint-Michel and Sakisama) for the Princess Tag Team Championship.

=== World Wonder Ring Stardom (2021–2024) ===
==== Donna Del Mondo (2021–2022) ====
Maiumi and Thekla from Ice Ribbon kept attacking various wrestlers from World Wonder Ring Stardom under masks from the beginning of the first event of the Stardom Super Wars trilogy which took place from November 3 to December 18, 2021. Giulia would announce on December 25, 2021, that both of the masked superstars would join her Donna Del Mondo unit at the beginning of 2022.

On January 3, 2022, at the Stardom Award event in Shinjuku, Thekla and Mirai were officially presented as the mysterious silhouettes as they teamed up with her to defeat Cosmic Angels' sub-unit of Tam Nakano, Unagi Sayaka and Mai Sakurai. At Stardom Nagoya Supreme Fight on January 29, 2022, Mirai unsuccessfully challenged stablemate Syuri for the World of Stardom Championship.

==== God's Eye (2022–2024) ====
On the first night of the Stardom Cinderella Tournament 2022 from April 3, Mirai defeated Mina Shirakawa in a first-round match. Due to Utami Hayashishita and Tam Nakano going into a draw and eliminating themselves from the tournament, Mirai would receive a walkover victory straight to the quarter-finals. At the end of the night, Syuri defeated Ami Sohrei in a first round match. After her victory, she named her newly created stable "God's Eye". Mirai eventually stepped up to align with Syuri and Sohrei after peacefully resigning from Donna Del Mondo.

On April 23, 2023, at All Star Grand Queendom, Mirai teamed with fellow God's Eye stablemate Ami Sohrei (under the name The New Eras), and defeated 7Upp (Nanae Takahashi and Yuu) to win the Goddesses of Stardom Championship. On June 25, at Stardom Sunshine 2023, New Eras lost their title to Rose Gold (Mina Shirakawa and Mariah May), ending their reign at 63 days. On July 2, at Mid Summer Champions 2023, Mirai defeated Tam Nakano to win the Wonder of Stardom Championship. At Dream Queendom 2023, Mirai lost the Wonder of Stardom Championship to Saori Anou.

At New Years Stars 2024 on January 3, 2024, Mirai, Ami Sohrei and Syuri, together known as Abarenbo GE, participated in the 2024 Triangle Derby. They defeated Baribari Bombers in the finals to win the tournament and the Artist of Stardom Championship.

=== Dream Star Fighting Marigold (2024–2025) ===
On April 15, 2024, former Stardom executive producer Rossy Ogawa, held a press conference to announce his new promotion Dream Star Fighting Marigold, with Mirai being one of the initial roster members. On July 30, Mirai and Mai Sakurai became the inaugural Marigold Twin Star Champions.

== Championships and accomplishments ==
- Dream Star Fighting Marigold
  - Marigold Twin Star Championship (1 time, inaugural) – with Mai Sakurai
  - Marigold Twin Star Championship Tournament (2024) – with Mai Sakurai
  - Dream★Star GP Award (2 times)
    - Dream League Best Match Award (2024) vs. Kouki Amarei on September 20
    - Star League Best Match Award (2025) vs. Mai Sakurai on August 30
  - Marigold Year-End Award (1 time)
    - Best Tag Team Award (2024) – with Mai Sakurai
- Professional Wrestling Just Tap Out
  - JTO Girls Championship (1 time)
  - JTO Girls Tag Team Championship (1 time, current) – with Tomoka Inaba
- Pro Wrestling Noah
  - GHC Women's Championship (1 time, current)
- Pro Wrestling Illustrated
  - Ranked No. 78 of the top 150 female wrestlers in the PWI Women's 150 in 2022
- Tokyo Joshi Pro-Wrestling
  - International Princess Championship (1 time)
- World Wonder Ring Stardom
  - Wonder of Stardom Championship (1 time)
  - Goddesses of Stardom Championship (1 time) – with Ami Sohrei
  - Artist of Stardom Championship (1 time) – with Syuri and Ami Sohrei
  - Triangle Derby (2024) – with Syuri and Ami Sohrei
  - Cinderella Tournament (2022, 2023)
  - Stardom Rambo (2022)
  - 5★Star GP Award (2 times)
    - 5★Star GP Blue Stars Best Match Award (2023) vs. Maika on September 30
    - 5★Star GP Technique Award (2022)
  - Stardom Year-End Award (1 time)
    - Best Technique Award (2023)
