= Nagisa Nozaki =

Japanese professional wrestler (born 1990)

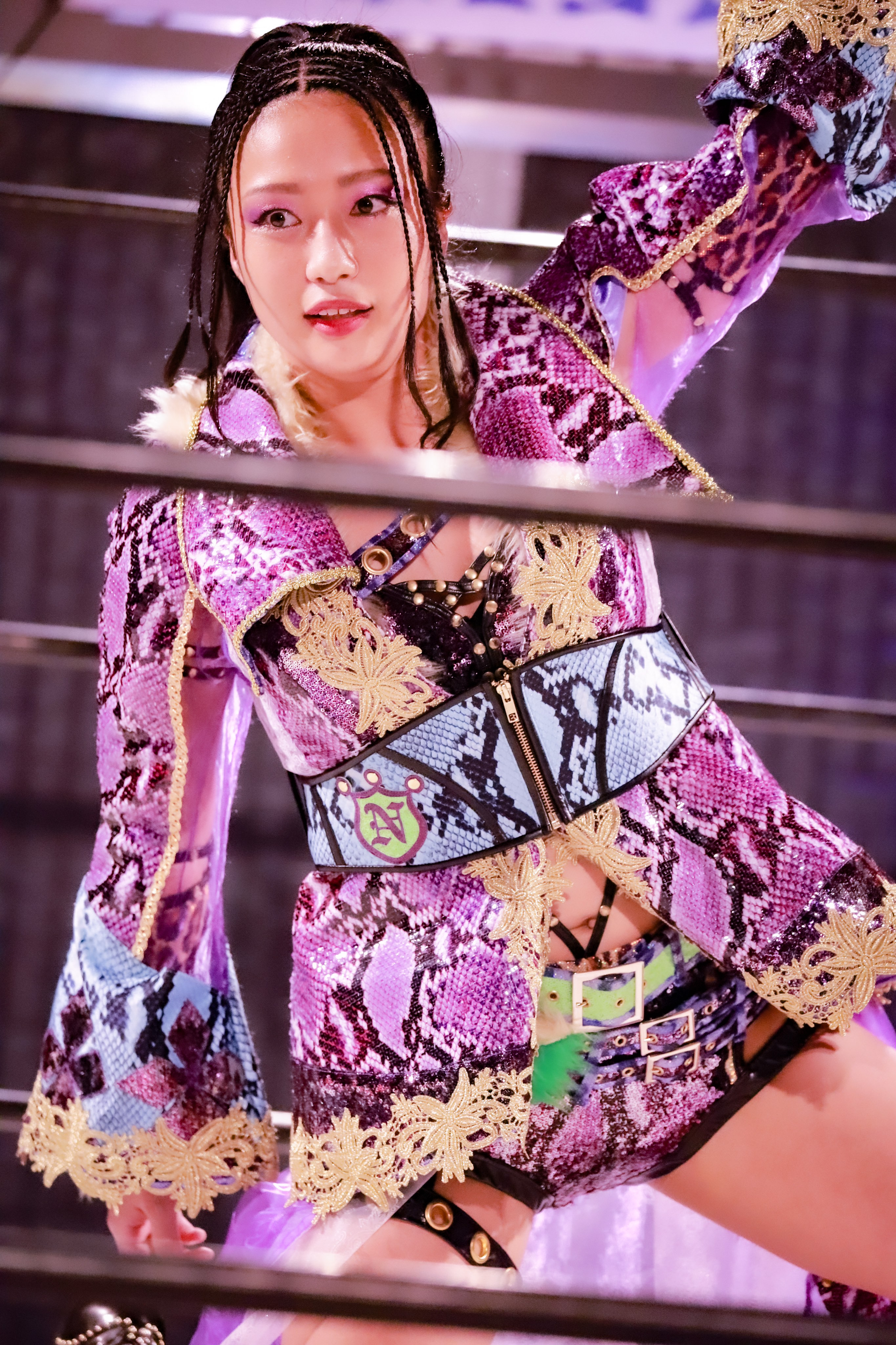
- Nozaki in June 2021

Personal information
- Born: Nagisa Nozaki; November 22, 1990 (age 35) Minamisaku District, Nagano

Professional wrestling career
- Ring name(s): Etsuko Nozaki; Nagisa Nozaki
- Billed height: 1.67 m (5 ft 5 1/2 in)
- Billed weight: 58 kg (128 lb)
- Trained by: Etsuko Mita
- Debut: November 3, 2006

Nagisa Nozaki (野崎 渚, Nozaki Nagisa; born November 22, 1990) is a Japanese professional wrestler. She started her career in the NEO Japan Ladies Pro-Wrestling promotion in November 2006. After the promotion folded in December 2010, she worked for independent promotions such as Pro Wrestling Wave and World Woman Pro-Wrestling Diana. Throughout her career, Nozaki has suffered several injuries, which eventually led to her taking a thirteen-month break from professional wrestling to undergo a shoulder surgery. She finally returned in August 2012, working for Wrestling New Classic (WNC). After another injury, Nozaki went inactive in January 2013, eventually returning with Pro Wrestling Wave in 2017.

== Professional wrestling career ==
=== NEO Japan Ladies Pro Wrestling (2006–2010) ===
Trained by Etsuko Mita at the NEO Japan Ladies Pro Wrestling dojo, Nozaki made her professional wrestling debut for the promotion on November 3, 2006, teaming with Kyoko Inoue in a tag team match, where they were defeated by Dynamite Kansai and Takako Inoue, with Inoue pinning Nozaki for the win. Nozaki started her career with a losing streak typical for rookies in puroresu, suffering defeats against the likes of Yuki Miyazaki, Haruka Matsuo, Toshie Uematsu, Etsuko Mita, and Arisa Nakajima. In early 2007, Nozaki formed the Seishun Midori ("Youth Green") tag team with Ice Ribbon representative Aoi Kizuki. On April 4, NEO and Ice Ribbon co-promoted an event, which featured a tournament to determine the inaugural International Ribbon Tag Team Champions. Seishun Midori entered the tournament, but was eliminated in the first round by the NEO Machineguns (Tanny Mouse and Yuki Miyazaki), who would go on to win the entire tournament. On May 5, Nozaki won her first professional wrestling match, though she did not score the deciding pinfall, when she teamed with Kizuki in a tag team match, where they defeated Emi Sakura and Hikari Minami. Nozaki finally scored her first direct pinfall win on July 22, when she defeated Ice Ribbon representative Makoto in a singles match. Nozaki continued teaming with Kizuki into 2008, before being sidelined with an anterior cruciate ligament injury following March 2.

Nozaki finally returned on April 19, 2009, when she was defeated by Aya Yuki in a singles match. Afterwards, Nozaki began teaming with Yuki, and was scheduled to team with her in the Mid Summer Tag Tournament VIII, but on June 27, she fractured her orbital floor, during a six-woman tag team match, where she, Yuki and Yoshiko Tamura were defeated by Revolucion Amandla (Atsuko Emoto, Kyoko Kimura and Tomoka Nakagawa). Nozaki returned on September 20, but injured her shoulder during a match, where she and Yuki were defeated by Hiroyo Matsumoto and Kyoko Inoue. Nozaki wrestled a comedic battle royal on October 24 as "Etsuko Nozaki", but was unable to wrestle any regular matches due to her injury; most notably, she was forced to pull out of her trainer Etsuko Mita's retirement match and give her spot over to Makoto. Nozaki underwent surgery on her shoulder on November 26, 2009.

During Nozaki's hiatus from in-ring action, NEO Japan Ladies Pro-Wrestling announced on May 5, 2010, that the promotion would be folding at the end of the year. Nozaki returned on August 1, 2010, losing to Smash representative Syuri in a singles match. Six days later, Nozaki was defeated in her second match since her return by Nanae Takahashi. The match was ended prematurely, when Takahashi dislocated Nozaki's right shoulder. Nozaki, however, did not miss any NEO events as a result of her latest injury. With NEO having announced its folding, Nozaki began looking for a new home promotion and, on September 24, made her debut for Smash, losing to Kana in a singles match at Smash.8. In her second Smash match on October 30 at Smash.9, Nozaki teamed with Syuri in a tag team match, where they defeated Tomoka Nakagawa and Toshie Uematsu. Nozaki also teamed with Syuri back in NEO; the two were defeated by Toshie Uematsu and Yuu Yamagata on November 21. The following day, Nozaki teamed with Akira, Kaoru and Scotty 2 Hotty in an eight-person tag team match at Smash.10, where they defeated Nunzio, Taka Michinoku, Tomoka Nakagawa and Toshie Uematsu. On December 11 at Smash.11, Nozaki, in her final Smash appearance, and Syuri were defeated in a tag team match by the JWP Joshi Puroresu team of Command Bolshoi and Kaori Yoneyama. On December 26, Nozaki picked up a rare win, defeating rookie Mika Iida at NEO's third to last ever event. NEO held its final event on December 31, 2010, during which she teamed with Hiroyo Matsumoto and Mima Shimoda in a six-woman tag team match, where they were defeated by the Ice Ribbon trio of Emi Sakura, Hikaru Shida and Tsukasa Fujimoto. Later that same event, in the final match ever promoted by NEO, Nozaki, Mika Iida and Aya Yuki wrestled Tanny Mouse, Yoshiko Tamura and Yuki Miyazaki to a ten-minute time limit draw.

=== Freelancing (2011) ===
On February 3, 2011, Nozaki wrestled her first match since the folding of NEO, teaming with Aya Yuki at a T-1 event, where they wrestled Futami President and Great Sasuke to a no contest. On April 17, Nozaki made her debut for former NEO worker Kyoko Inoue's new World Woman Pro-Wrestling Diana promotion, losing to Nanae Takahashi in a singles match. After suffering another loss to Yumi Ohka on April 24, Nozaki picked up her first Diana win five days later, defeating Sareee. On May 1, Nozaki was defeated in a singles match by Gami. The following day, Nozaki made her debut for Gami's Pro Wrestling Wave promotion, entering the 2011 Catch the Wave tournament and defeating Yumi Ohka in her opening round-robin match. On May 4, Nozaki was booked for a Diana event, but ended up no-showing the event. Six days later, Diana publicly fired Nozaki for a "serious breach of contract". Nozaki quickly apologized for her actions and revealed that she was considering retiring from professional wrestling as a result of her firing. On May 17, Nozaki continued her Catch the Wave tournament with a win over Mio Shirai, however, she would lose her two remaining matches against Misaki Ohata on June 15, and against Ayumi Kurihara on July 6, and, as a result, finished third in her block and failed to advance from her block. Nozaki wrestled her final Wave match on July 24, when she, Bambi and Yumi Ohka, all representing the villainous Black Dahlia stable, defeated Ayumi Kurihara, Ryo Mizunami and Sakura Hirota in a six-woman tag team match. Afterwards, Nozaki announced that she was taking an indefinite break from professional wrestling to heal her shoulder. Nozaki underwent surgery on her shoulder on February 2, 2012.

=== Wrestling New Classic (2012–2013) ===
On August 2, 2012, Nozaki made a surprise debut for Wrestling New Classic (WNC), the follow-up promotion to Smash, attacking Makoto with a shinai and aligning herself with Hajime Ohara. The appearance marked Nozaki's first professional wrestling appearance in thirteen months. Dubbing herself "Nozabitch", Nozaki began working in WNC as a villain for the first time in her career, adopting the shinai as her signature weapon. The following day, Nozaki managed Ohara at another WNC event, where he was victorious over El Hijo del Pantera in a singles match. Nozaki made her in-ring debut for WNC on August 30 in Korakuen Hall, defeating Makoto via referee stoppage with the sleeper hold. The two had two rematches the following day days; Nozaki was also victorious in both of them with the sleeper hold. During the weekend, Nozaki and Ohara were also joined by rookie Jiro Kuroshio. On September 17, Nozaki earned yet another sleeper hold win over Makoto in a tag team match, where she teamed with Kuroshio and Makoto with Yusuke Kodama. On October 19, Nozaki, Ohara and Kuroshio named their stable "Kabushiki gaisha DQN" On November 27, Nozaki returned to Pro Wrestling Wave, teaming with Hikaru Shida in a five-way tag team match, which was used to determine the number one contenders to the Wave Tag Team Championship and won by Makoto and Moeka Haruhi. The following day, after receiving a first round bye, Nozaki entered the WNC Women's Championship tournament in the semifinal stage, defeating Kana with help from Jiro Kuroshio. Following the upset win, Nozaki began using Kana's nickname, "World Famous". Prior to the final match, Nozaki began making appearances wearing crutches, claiming that she had broken her leg, having fallen over drunk. During the tournament final on December 27, Nozaki revealed that her supposed injury had been a bluff as she started the match off by attacking her opponent, Syuri, from behind. Despite this, Nozaki was eventually defeated, suffering her first direct loss in WNC. Nozaki suffered her second loss in a row at WNC's first event of 2013 on January 4, when she was defeated by Makoto. On January 25, Nozaki was, for the second time in her career, sidelined with an orbital floor fracture, suffered during a six-person tag team match, where she, Hajime Ohara and Jiro Kuroshio defeated Lin Byron, Yo-Hey and Zeus. While Nozaki was recovering from her injury, Hajime Ohara legitimately quit WNC, effectively ending DQN K.K.

=== Pro Wrestling Wave (2017–present) ===
After over four years of inactivity, it was announced on June 4, 2017, that Nozaki would be returning to the ring with Pro Wrestling Wave on August 12. In her return match, Nozaki teamed with Aoi Kizuki with the two losing to Mika Iida and Yuki Miyazaki. On September 14, it was announced that Nozaki had officially signed with Zabun, the parent company of Wave. In November, Nozaki defeated Miyuki Takase, Rina Yamashita and Mio Momono to win the Next Tournament, earning a shot at Wave's top title, the Wave Single Championship. She went on to unsuccessfully challenge Misaki Ohata for the title on November 26. On December 29, 2019, Nozaki defeated Takumi Iroha to win the Wave Single Championship for the first time. On December 27, 2020, Nozaki lost the title to Sakura Hirota, ending her reign at 364 days.

== Championships and accomplishments ==
- Dream Star Fighting Marigold
  - Marigold Twin Star Championship (1 time) – with Chiaki
- Pro Wrestling Wave
  - Regina Di Wave Championship (2 times)
  - Wave Tag Team Championship (1 time) – with Yuki Miyazaki
  - Next Tournament (2017)
  - Catch the Wave Award (1 time)
    - Best Bout Award (2019) vs. Himeka Arita on July 1
- Seadlinnng
  - Beyond the Sea Tag Team Championship (1 time) – with Makoto
- World Woman Pro-Wrestling Diana
  - WWWD World Championship (1 time)
