= Sukeban (professional wrestling) =

American independent professional wrestling promotion

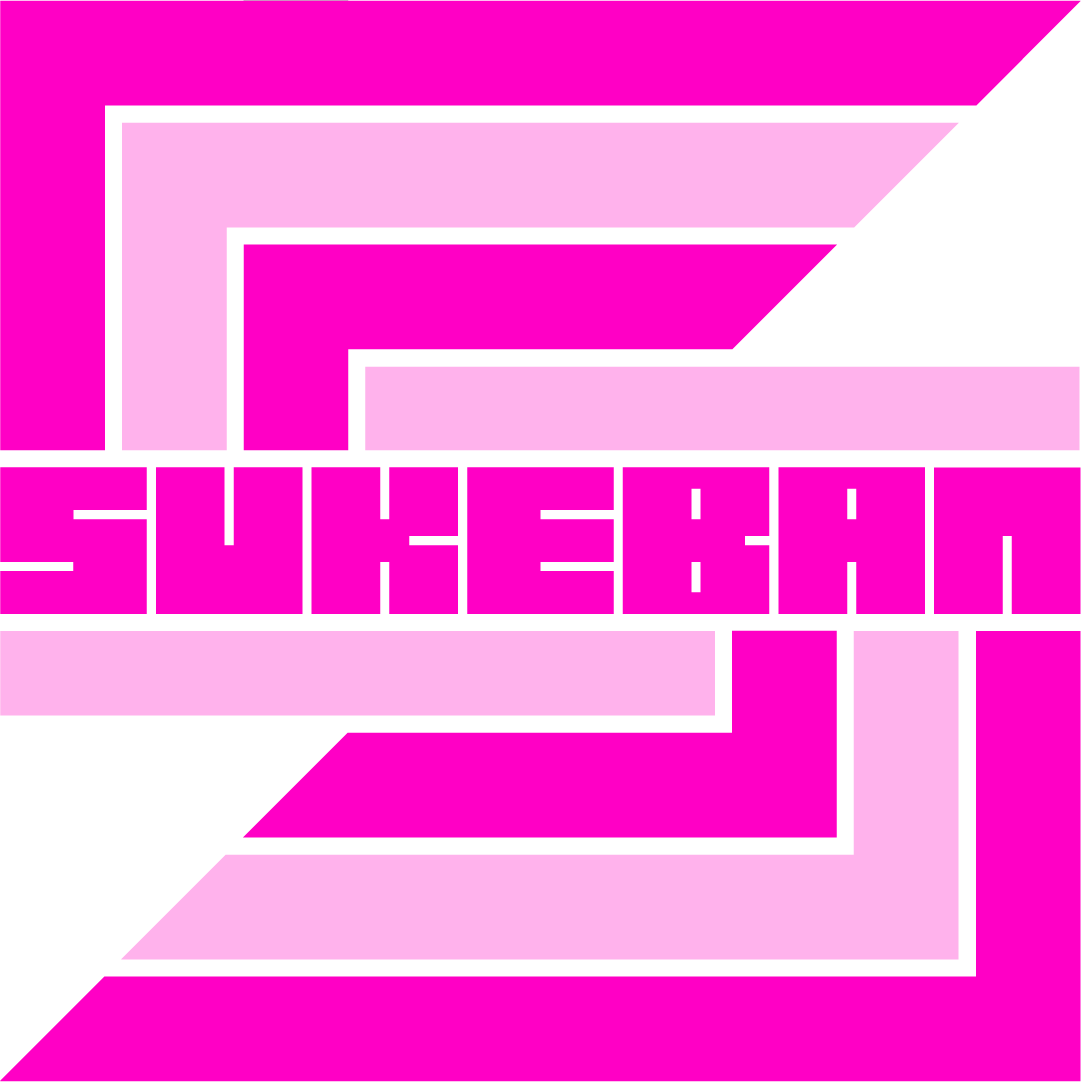
- Founded: September 1, 2023; 2 years ago
- Style: Women's professional wrestling (Joshi puroresu)
- Headquarters: New York City, New York, U.S. Tokyo, Japan
- Owner: Dream Slam Productions
- Website: sukeban.com

Sukeban is an American independent women's professional wrestling promotion and multimedia entertainment brand founded in 2023. The promotion's name is an ode to the girl gangs present in Japan in the 1960s and 70s, referred to in Japanese culture as "Sukeban". The promotion is heavily influenced by real-life Sukeban groups and divides its roster of wrestlers into different units or gangs.

It operates between Tokyo and New York, presents international live wrestling events, and produces media and fashion collaborations. The promotion blends professional wrestling with Japanese subculture aesthetics including fashion, anime, music and performance art.

== History ==
Sukeban was founded in 2023 and debuted in New York City on September 21, 2023. The promotion’s name references the Japanese sukeban subculture of female delinquent gangs popular in the 1960s and 1970s. Japan has historically been a major center of women’s professional wrestling, known as joshi puroresu.

During the event, Bull Nakano, who was revealed to be the Sukeban commissioner, unveiled the Sukeban World Championship. After its debut, the promotion staged events tied to major cultural festivals including Art Basel Miami and Anime Expo.

Sukeban presents wrestling as a multimedia project combining athletic competition, serialized storytelling, fashion design and collaborations. In 2025, the company partnered with NTT Docomo Studio & Live to develop global entertainment content.

== Championships ==
Championship	Current champion(s)	Reign	Date won	Days held	Location	Notes
Sukeban World Championship	Ichigo Sayaka	1	December 3, 2025	261+	Miami, Florida, USA	Defeated Atomic Banshee at Sukeban Miami.

=== Sukeban World Championship ===
Sukeban World Championship

Details
- Promotion: Sukeban
- Date established: September 22, 2023
- Current champion: Ichigo Sayaka
- Date won: December 3, 2025
Statistics
- First champion: Commander Nakajima
- Longest reign: Sareee Bomb (400 days)
- Shortest reign: Atomic Banshee (19 days)
- Oldest champion: Ichigo Sayaka (39 years, 92 days)
- Youngest champion: Atomic Banshee (age is unknown) (Note: During her wrestling career, Atomic Banshee has kept her age private. While her exact age is unknown, she is the youngest champion as she started wrestling at age of seven or eight in 2005.)

The Sukeban World Championship is a women's professional wrestling world championship created and promoted by the Sukeban promotion. The title, which is situated at the top of Sukeban's championship hierarchy, was introduced on September 22, 2023, and the inaugural champion was crowned on December 6, 2023 when Commander Nakajima defeated Ichigo Sayaka to become the inaugural champion.

Later champions included Sareee Bomb and Atomic Banshee. Ichigo Sayaka regained the championship in Miami in December 2025.

Key
No.	Overall reign number
Reign	Reign number for the specific champion
Days	Number of days held
Defenses	Number of successful defenses
+	Current reign is changing daily

No.	Champion	Championship change			Reign statistics			Notes	Ref.
No.	Champion	Date	Event	Location	Reign	Days	Defenses	Notes	Ref.
1	Commander Nakajima	December 6, 2023	Sukeban Miami	Miami, Florida, USA	1	309	1	Defeated Ichigo Sayaka to become the inaugural champion.	
2	Sareee Bomb	October 10, 2024	Sukeban London	London, England	1	400	1		
3	Atomic Banshee	November 14, 2025	Sukeban Tokyo	Tokyo, Japan	1	19	0		
4	Ichigo Sayaka	December 3, 2025	Sukeban Miami 2025	Miami, Florida, USA	1	261+	2		

== Personnel ==
=== Wrestlers ===
==== Harajuku Stars ====
Ring Name	Real Name	Notes
Ichigo Sayaka	Sayaka Unagi	Sukeban World Champion
Maya Mamushi	Maya Yukihi	
Saki Bimi	Saki Watanabe	
Babyface	Anna Fujiki	

==== Dangerous Liaisons ====
Ring Name	Real Name
Countess Rea Seto	Unknown
Lady Antoinette	Risa Okuda
Queen of Hearts	Miyuki Takase
Victoria Yuzuki	Unknown

==== The Vandals ====
Ring Name	Real Name
Atomic Banshee	Unknown
Bingo	Hiroyo Matsumoto
Otaku-chan	Kaori Yoneyama
Midnight Player	Unknown

==== Cherry Bomb Girls ====
Ring Name	Real Name
Crush Yuu	Unknown
Supersonic	Natsumi Mizushima
Nagisa	Nagisa Tachibana

==== Tokyo Toys ====
Ring Name	Real Name
Smack in the Box	Misa Matsui
Delirious Dolly	Azusa Inaba
Krackin’ Kouki	Kouki Amarei
Seri Bear	Seri Yamaoka

=== Other personnel ===
Ring name	Real name	Notes
Bull Nakano	Keiko Aoki	Commissioner

== Alumni ==
Ring name	Real name	Notes
Commander Nakajima	Arisa Nakajima	Retired; has wrestled in Sukeban on a part-time basis since retiring
Riko Kaiju	Riko Shirai	Retired
Sareee Bomb	Sari Fujimura	Departed on Sukeban in 2026
Countess Saori	Saori Anou	Last Appearance in 2024
Venomous Veny	None	Departed on Sukeban in November 14 2025

== Creative collaborations ==
Fashion designer Olympia Le-Tan serves as creative director and designs costumes for the promotion. The brand collaborated with artists and creatives across fashion and music including Pat McGrath and Isamaya Ffrench. The championship belt was designed by the Australian designer Marc Newson, who worked in collaboration with the Japanese illustrator Ayako Ishiguro. Special hats for the wrestlers were created by British milliner Stephen Jones.

== See also ==
- Joshi puroresu
- Professional wrestling in the United States
