= Marigold Dream Star Grand Prix 2025 =

2025 Dream Star Fighting Marigold wrestling tournament

- Promotional poster of the event finals
- Promotion: Dream Star Fighting Marigold
- Date: August 2 – September 14, 2025
- City: Osaka, Japan; Hiroshima, Japan; Miyako, Japan; Sendai, Miyagi, Japan; Ichikawa, Japan; Tokyo, Japan; Toyama, Japan; Arakawa, Japan; Tsu, Mie, Japan
- Venue: Edion Arena Osaka; Hiroshima Prefectural Gymnasium; Miyako Sea Arena; Sendai PIT; Ichikawa City Cultural Hall; Shibuya Ward Sports Center; Sunpearl Arakawa; Korakuen Hall; Shinjuku Face; Bolfert Toyama 2F Multipurpose Hall; Mie Prefectural Cultural Cente

Event chronology
← Previous; Burning Desire 2025	Next → Grand Destiny 2025

Dream Star Grand Prix chronology
← Previous; 2024	Next → —

Marigold Dream Star Grand Prix
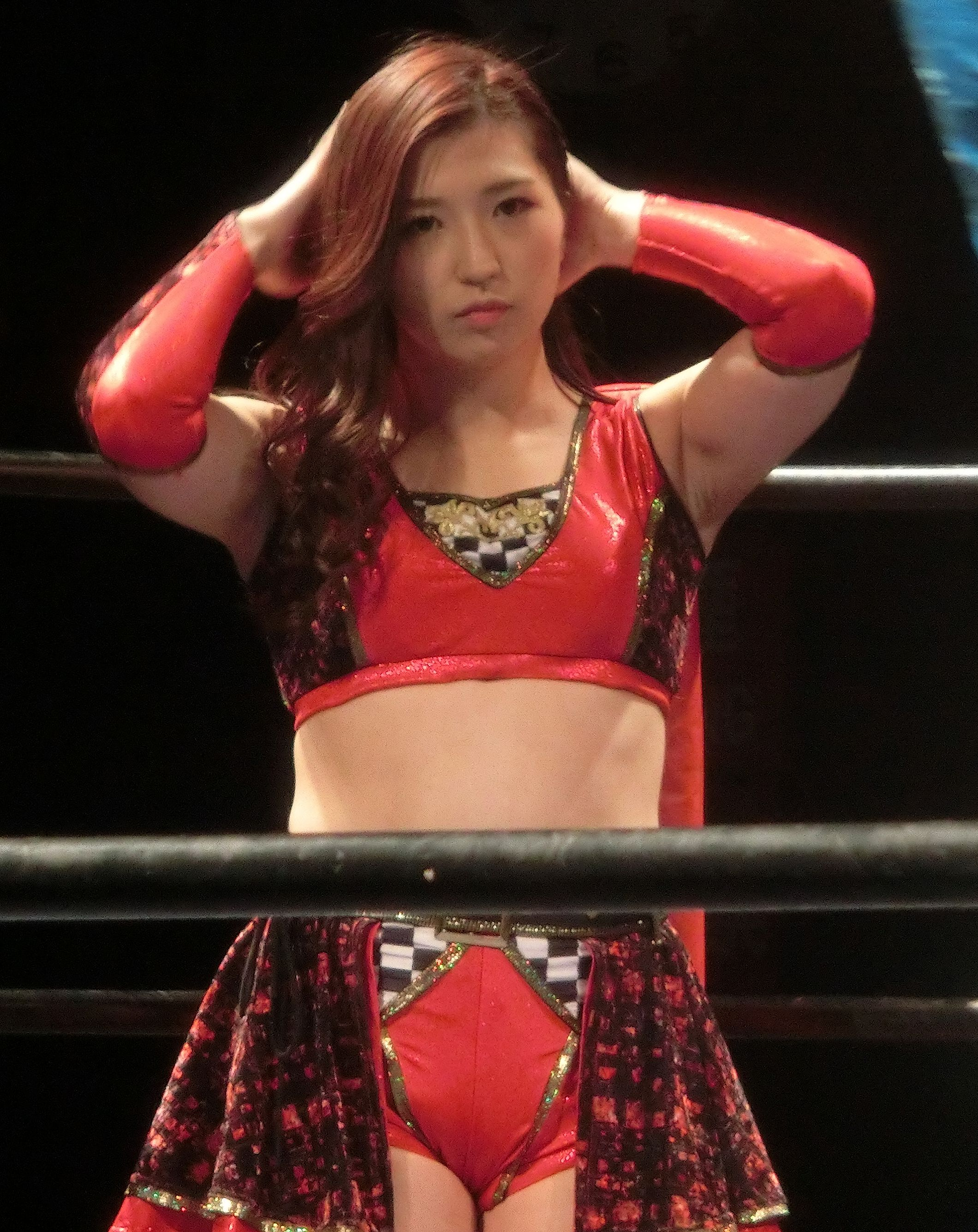
- Miku Aono, winner of the 2025 Dream Star Grand Prix.

Tournament information
- Sport: Professional wrestling
- Location: Japan
- Dates: August 2, 2025–September 14, 2025
- Tournament format: Two-block round-robin
- Participants: 16

Final positions
- Champions: Miku Aono
- Runner-up: Victoria Yuzuki

Tournament statistics
- Bouts fought: 57

Marigold Dream Star Grand Prix 2025 (マリーゴールドドリームスターグランプリ2025, Marīgōrudo dorīmu sutā guranpuri 2025), stylized as DREAM✴︎STAR GP 2025, was a professional wrestling tournament promoted by the Japanese promotion Dream Star Fighting Marigold. It took place between August 2 and September 14, 2025.

== Tournament history ==
The Dream Star Grand Prix is a professional wrestling tournament held by Marigold. Similar to Bushiroad-owned counterpart tournaments New Japan Pro-Wrestling's G1 Climax and Stardom 5 Star Grand Prix, it is held as a round-robin tournament with wrestlers split into two pools. The winner of each pool competed in the final to decide the winner. As is the case with Bushiroad tournaments, a win is two points and a draw is one point for each wrestler.

=== Storylines ===
The event featured professional wrestling matches that resulted from scripted storylines, where wrestlers portrayed villains, heroes, or less distinguishable characters in the scripted events that built tension and culminated in a wrestling match or series of matches.

== Qualifiers ==
The format of the tournament saw 16 wrestlers divided in two blocks. Marigold initially announced fifteen contestants with several extras (both domestic and from other organizations) having to undergo a qualifying gauntlet match. However, on June 18, Marigold announced that Natsumi Showzuki would undergo shoulder surgery that would keep her out of action for the remainder of 2025, with another qualifying gauntlet match being made to determine her replacement.

=== Qualifying matches ===
June 28
No.	Results	Stipulations	Times
1	Rea Seto defeated Minami Yuuki, Nao Ishikawa, and Yuuka Yamazaki	Dream Star Grand Prix Qualifying gauntlet match	8:51
2	Senka Akatsuki defeated Nagisa Tachibana, Komomo Minami, and Hummingbird	Dream Star Grand Prix Qualifying gauntlet match	9:43

== Participants ==
*Noted underneath are the champions who held their titles at the time of the tournament. The titleholders or even the number of contestants can change over time.

Wrestler	Notes
Chanyota	Freelancer
Chiaki	
Chika Goto	
Kizuna Tanaka	
Kouki Amarei	
Mai Sakurai	Marigold United National Champion
Mayu Iwatani	Marigold Super Fly Champion
Miku Aono	Winner
Mirai	
Misa Matsui	
Nagisa Nozaki	Freelancer
Seri Yamaoka	
Utami Hayashishita	Marigold World Champion
Victoria Yuzuki	
Maria (Note: Replaced Senka Akatsuki in the competition after the latter pulled out due to pneumonia.)	Marvelous; Marigold Twin Star Champion
Rea Seto	Qualifying match winner
Senka Akatsuki	Marvelous; Qualifying match winner

== Standings ==
=== Overview ===
Final standings
Dream League		Star League	
Victoria Yuzuki	10	Miku Aono	10
Utami Hayashishita	9	Mai Sakurai	9
Mayu Iwatani	9	Mirai	8
Kouki Amarei	8	Misa Matsui	8
Seri Yamaoka	8	Nagisa Nozaki	7
Maria	6	Chika Goto	7
Rea Seto	3	Chanyota	5
Chiaki	3	Kizuna Tanaka	2

Dream League	Hayashishita	Iwatani	Yuzuki	Amarei	Yamaoka	Chiaki	Seto	Maria
Hayashishita	—N/a	Draw (15:00)	Yuzuki (11:13)	Amarei (9:51)	Hayashishita (11:03)	Hayashishita (7:27)	Hayashishita (6:16)	Hayashishita (8:58)
Iwatani	Draw (15:00)	—N/a	Draw (15:00)	Iwatani (10:58)	Yamaoka (10:50)	Draw (8:46)	Iwatani (7:28)	Iwatani (8:23)
Yuzuki	Yuzuki (11:13)	Draw (15:00)	—N/a	Amarei (12:23)	Yuzuki (14:06)	Yuzuki (8:34)	Draw (15:00)	Yuzuki (8:34)
Amarei	Amarei (9:51)	Iwatani (10:58)	Amarei (12:23)	—N/a	Amarei (13:30)	Chiaki (9:00)	Amarei (5:18)	Maria (9:39)
Yamaoka	Hayashishita (11:03)	Yamaoka (10:50)	Yuzuki (14:06)	Amarei (13:30)	—N/a	Yamaoka (8:42)	Yamaoka; Default	Yamaoka (9:30)
Chiaki	Hayashishita (7:27)	Draw (8:46)	Yuzuki (8:34)	Chiaki (9:00)	Yamaoka (8:42)	—N/a	Seto (8:24)	Maria (4:46)
Seto	Hayashishita (6:16)	Iwatani (7:28)	Draw (15:00)	Amarei (5:18)	Yamaoka; Default	Seto (8:24)	—N/a	Maria (8:59)
Maria	Hayashishita (8:58)	Iwatani (8:23)	Yuzuki (8:34)	Maria (9:39)	Yamaoka (9:30)	Maria (4:46)	Maria (8:59)	—N/a

Star League	Sakurai	Aono	Mirai	Goto	Tanaka	Matsui	Nozaki	Chanyota
Sakurai	—N/a	Draw (15:00)	Sakurai (13:06)	Sakurai (8:38)	Sakurai (7:56)	Matsui (11:10)	Sakurai (7:02)	Chanyota (13:00)
Aono	Draw (15:00)	—N/a	Draw (15:00)	Aono (11:55)	Aono (7:19)	Matsui (12:41)	Aono (11:19)	Aono (8:56)
Mirai	Sakurai (13:06)	Draw (15:00)	—N/a	Mirai (9:21)	Mirai (8:45)	Mirai (12:28)	Nozaki (11:11)	Draw (5:11)
Goto	Sakurai (8:38)	Aono (11:55)	Mirai (9:21)	—N/a	Goto (7:12)	Goto (9:16)	Draw (6:59)	Goto (9:46)
Tanaka	Sakurai (7:56)	Aono (7:19)	Mirai (8:45)	Goto (7:12)	—N/a	Tanaka (8:02)	Nozaki (5:00)	Chanyota (6:05)
Matsui	Matsui (11:10)	Matsui (12:41)	Mirai (12:28)	Goto (9:16)	Tanaka (8:02)	—N/a	Matsui (5:51)	Matsui (9:27)
Nozaki	Sakurai (7:02)	Aono (11:19)	Nozaki (11:11)	Draw (6:59)	Nozaki (5:00)	Matsui (5:51)	—N/a	Nozaki (9:44)
Chanyota	Chanyota (13:00)	Aono (8:56)	Draw (5:11)	Goto (9:46)	Chanyota (6:05)	Matsui (9:27)	Nozaki (9:44)	—N/a

Final
Dream	Victoria Yuzuki	Pin
Star	Miku Aono	14:48

== Results ==
=== Day 1 (Morning) ===
This event took place in the morning of August 2, 2025.

No.	Results	Stipulations	Times
1	Komomo Minami, Minami Yuuki, Shinno, and Yuuka Yamazaki defeated Nagisa Tachibana, Nao Ishikawa, Megaton, and Hummingbird by pinfall	Eight-woman tag team match	7:06
2	Seri Yamaoka defeated Chiaki by pinfall	Dream League match in the 2025 Dream Star Grand Prix	8:42
3	Nagisa Nozaki defeated Kizuna Tanaka by pinfall	Star League match in the 2025 Dream Star Grand Prix	5:00
4	Kouki Amarei defeated Rea Seto by pinfall	Dream League match in the 2025 Dream Star Grand Prix	5:18
5	Mirai defeated Chika Goto by pinfall	Star League match in the 2025 Dream Star Grand Prix	9:21
6	Misa Matsui defeated Miku Aono by pinfall	Star League match in the 2025 Dream Star Grand Prix	12:41
7	Mayu Iwatani defeated Maria by pinfall	Dream League match in the 2025 Dream Star Grand Prix	8:23
8	Chanyota defeated Mai Sakurai by pinfall	Star League match in the 2025 Dream Star Grand Prix	13:00
9	Victoria Yuzuki defeated Utami Hayashishita by pinfall	Dream League match in the 2025 Dream Star Grand Prix	11:13

=== Day 1 (Afternoon) ===
This event took place in the afternoon of August 2, 2025

No.	Results	Stipulations	Times
1	Komomo Minami and Nagisa Tachibana defeated Shinno and Yuuka Yamazaki by pinfall	Tag team match	7:22
2	Minami Yuuki and Hummingbird defeated Megaton and Gigaton by pinfall	Tag team match	6:05
3	Chanyota defeated Kizuna Tanaka by submission	Star League match in the 2025 Dream Star Grand Prix	6:54
4	Victoria Yuzuki defeated Chiaki by pinfall	Dream League match in the 2025 Dream Star Grand Prix	8:34
5	Maria defeated Kouki Amarei by submission	Dream League match in the 2025 Dream Star Grand Prix	9:39
6	Chika Goto defeated Misa Matsui by pinfall	Star League match in the 2025 Dream Star Grand Prix	9:16
7	Utami Hayashishita defeated Rea Seto by pinfall	Dream League match in the 2025 Dream Star Grand Prix	8:16
8	Mai Sakurai defeated Nagisa Nozaki by submission	Star League match in the 2025 Dream Star Grand Prix	7:02
9	Miku Aono vs. Mirai ended in a time limit draw	Star League match in the 2025 Dream Star Grand Prix	15:00
10	Seri Yamaoka defeated Mayu Iwatani by pinfall	Dream League match in the 2025 Dream Star Grand Prix	10:50

=== Day 2 ===
This event took place on August 3, 2025

No.	Results	Stipulations	Times
1	Hummingbird defeated Nagisa Tachibana and Nao Ishikawa by pinfall	Three-way match	6:00
2	Darkness Revolution (Nagisa Nozaki and Rea Seto) defeated Kouki Amarei and Megaton by submission	Tag team match	9:07
3	Misa Matsui defeated Chanyota by pinfall	Star League match in the 2025 Dream Star Grand Prix	9:27
4	Mirai and Selene Flora (Victoria Yuzuki and Kizuna Tanaka) defeated Mai Sakurai, Chika Goto, and Minami Yuuki by pinfall	Six-woman tag team match	12:08
5	Utami Hayashishita defeated Chiaki by pinfall	Dream League match in the 2025 Dream Star Grand Prix	7:27
6	Mayu Iwatani, Seri Yamaoka, and Shinno defeated Komomo Minami, Miku Aono, and Yuka Yamazaki by pinfall	Six-woman tag team match	17:18

=== Day 3 ===
This event took place on August 9, 2025.

No.	Results	Stipulations	Times
1	Hummingbird defeated Nagisa Tachibana by pinfall	Singles match	6:37
2	Shinno defeated Nao Ishikawa and Megaton by submission	Three-way match	9:08
3	Chiaki defeated Kouki Amarei by pinfall	Dream League match in the 2025 Dream Star Grand Prix	9:00
4	Utami Hayashishita, Komomo Minami, and Minami Yuuki defeated Kizuna Tanaka, Miku Aono, and Yuka Yamazaki by pinfall	Six-woman tag team match	9:22
5	Mai Sakurai defeated Chika Goto by submission	Star League match in the 2025 Dream Star Grand Prix	8:38
6	Seri Yamaoka, Victoria Yuzuki, and Mirai defeated Darkness Revolution (Nagisa Nozaki, Misa Matsui, and Rea Seto) by submission	Six-woman tag team match	14:43

=== Day 4 ===
This event took place on August 10, 2025.

No.	Results	Stipulations	Times
1	Nao Ishikawa and Hummingbird defeated Nagisa Tachibana and Yuka Yamazaki by pinfall	Tag team match	10:07
2	Mirai defeated Chiaki and Megaton by submission	Three-way match	5:40
3	Nagisa Nozaki defeated Chanyota by submission	Star League match in the 2025 Dream Star Grand Prix	9:44
4	Utami Hayashishita, Komomo Minami, Kizuna Tanaka, and Shinno defeated Kouki Amarei, Minami Yuuki, Miku Aono, and Chika Goto by pinfall	Eight-woman tag team match	16:59
5	Misa Matsui defeated Mai Sakurai by pinfall	Star League match in the 2025 Dream Star Grand Prix	11:10
6	Mayu Iwatani defeated Rea Seto by pinfall	Dream League match in the 2025 Dream Star Grand Prix	7:28
7	Victoria Yuzuki defeated Seri Yamaoka by pinfall	Dream League match in the 2025 Dream Star Grand Prix	14:06

=== Day 5 ===
This event took place on August 16, 2025.

No.	Results	Stipulations	Times
1	Komomo Minami defeated Nagisa Tachibana and Yuka Yamazaki by submission	Three-way match	9:24
2	Darkness Revolution (Misa Matsui, Chiki, and Rea Seto) defeated Chika Goto, Kizuna Tanaka, and Minami Yuuki by pinfall	Six-woman tag team match	10:50
3	Mayu Iwatani, Victoria Yuzuki, and Shinno defeated Nao Ishikawa, Hummingbird, and Megaton by submission	Six-woman tag team match	12:12
4	Nagisa Nozaki defeated Mirai by countout	Star League match in the 2025 Dream Star Grand Prix	11:11
5	Utami Hayashishita defeated Seri Yamaoka by pinfall	Dream League match in the 2025 Dream Star Grand Prix	11:03
6	Mai Sakurai and Maya Yukihi defeated Miku Aono and Kouki Amarei by pinfall	Tag team match	15:14

=== Day 6 ===
This event took place on August 17, 2025.

No.	Results	Stipulations	Times
1	Nao Ishikawa and Hummingbird defeated Nagisa Tachibana and Yuka Yamazaki by pinfall	Tag team match	8:23
2	Maria defeated Rea Seto by Submission	Dream League match in the 2025 Dream Star Grand Prix	8:59
3	Darkness Revolution (Misa Matsui and Chiaki) defeated Miku Aono and Megaton by submission	Tag team match	8:05
4	Kouki Amarei and Mirai defeated Minami Yuuki and Chika Goto by pinfall	Tag team match	11:55
5	Mai Sakurai defeated Kizuna Tanaka by submission	Star League match in the 2025 Dream Star Grand Prix	7:56
6	Mayu Iwatani, Seri Yamaoka, and Shinno defeated Utami Hayashishita, Victoria Yuzuki, and Komomo Minami by pinfall	Six-woman tag team match	13:48

=== Day 7 ===
This event took place on August 22, 2025.

No.	Results	Stipulations	Times
1	Nagisa Tachibana defeated Nao Ishikawa by pinfall	Singles match	8:23
2	Darkness Revolution (Chiaki, Misa Matsui, and Rea Seto) defeated Miku Aono, Hummingbird, and Megaton by Submission	Six-woman tag team match	11:42
3	Mai Sakurai, Seri Yamaoka, and Minami Yuuki defeated Mirai, Komomo Minami, and Yuka Yamazaki by pinfall	Six-woman tag team match	10:15
4	Kouki Amarei defeated Victoria Yuzuki by pinfall	Dream League match in the 2025 Dream Star Grand Prix	12:23
5	Utami Hayashishita defeated Maria by pinfall	Dream League match in the 2025 Dream Star Grand Prix	8:58
6	Mayu Iwatani defeated Chika Goto by pinfall	Singles match	17:02

=== Day 8 ===
This event took place on August 30, 2025.

No.	Results	Stipulations	Times
1	Komomo Minami, Minami Yuuki, and Nagisa Tachibana defeated Nao Ishikawa, Hummingbird, and Yuuka Yamazaki by pinfall	Six-woman tag team match	6:44
2	Rea Seto defeated Chiaki by pinfall	Dream League match in the 2025 Dream Star Grand Prix	8:24
3	Kizuna Tanaka defeated Misa Matsui by pinfall	Star League match in the 2025 Dream Star Grand Prix	8:02
4	Chika Goto vs. Nagisa Nozaki ended in a double countout	Star League match in the 2025 Dream Star Grand Prix	6:59
5	Victoria Yuzuki defeated Maria by pinfall	Dream League match in the 2025 Dream Star Grand Prix	8:34
6	Kouki Amarei defeated Seri Yamaoka by pinfall	Dream League match in the 2025 Dream Star Grand Prix	13:30
7	Miku Aono defeated Chanyota by pinfall	Star League match in the 2025 Dream Star Grand Prix	8:56
8	Mai Sakurai defeated Mirai by referee's decision	Star League match in the 2025 Dream Star Grand Prix	13:06
9	Utami Hayashishita vs. Mayu Iwatani ended in a time limit draw	Dream League match in the 2025 Dream Star Grand Prix	15:00

=== Day 9 ===
This event took place on September 2, 2025.

No.	Results	Stipulations	Times
1	Komomo Minami defeated Nagisa Tachibana by pinfall	Singles match	5:15
2	Mai Sakurai and Hummingbird defeated Nao Ishikawa and Yuuka Yamazaki by submission	Tag team match	8:08
3	Darkness Revolution (Nagisa Nozaki, Misa Matsui, and Chiaki) defeated Utami Hayashishita, Minami Yuuki, and Mirai by pinfall	Six-woman tag team match	11:20
4	Chika Goto defeated Chanyota by pinfall	Star League match in the 2025 Dream Star Grand Prix	9:46
5	Seri Yamaoka defeated Maria by pinfall	Dream League match in the 2025 Dream Star Grand Prix	9:30
6	Miku Aono defeated Kizuna Tanaka by pinfall	Star League match in the 2025 Dream Star Grand Prix	7:19
7	Victoria Yuzuki vs. Rea Seto ended in a time limit draw	Dream League match in the 2025 Dream Star Grand Prix	15:00
8	Mayu Iwatani defeated Kouki Amarei by pinfall	Dream League match in the 2025 Dream Star Grand Prix	10:58

=== Day 10 ===
This event took place on September 6, 2025.

No.	Results	Stipulations	Times
1	Komomo Minami defeated Minami Yuuki, Rea Seto and Hummingbird by pinfall	Four-way match	7:00
2	Selene Flora (Victoria Yuzuki and Kizuna Tanaka) defeated Seri Yamaoka and Yuuka Yamazaki by pinfall	Tag team match	14:03
3	Mirai defeated Misa Matsui by pinfall	Star League match in the 2025 Dream Star Grand Prix	12:28
4	Miku Aono defeated Nagisa Nozaki by pinfall	Star League match in the 2025 Dream Star Grand Prix	11:19
5	Chiaki vs. Mayu Iwatani ended in a double countout	Dream League match in the 2025 Dream Star Grand Prix	8:46
6	Utami Hayashishita, Kouki Amarei and Nao Ishikawa defeated Mai Sakurai, Chika Goto and Nagisa Tachibana by pinfall	Six-woman tag team match	17:07

=== Day 11 ===
This event took place on September 7, 2025.

No.	Results	Stipulations	Times
1	Minami Yuuki defeated Komomo Minami by pinfall	Singles match	8:39
2	Chiaki defeated Nao Ishikawa by pinfall	Singles match	6:48
3	Mirai defeated Kizuna Tanaka by pinfall	Star League match in the 2025 Dream Star Grand Prix	8:45
4	Miku Aono defeated Chika Goto by submission	Star League match in the 2025 Dream Star Grand Prix	11:55
5	Mayu Iwatani, Victoria Yuzuki, and Seri Yamaoka defeated Mai Sakurai, Hummingbird and Nagisa Tachibana by pinfall	Six-woman tag team match	12:27
6	Utami Hayashishita, Kouki Amarei and Yuuka Yumazaki defeated Darkness Revolution (Misa Matsui, Nagisa Nozaki and Rea Seto) by pinfall	Six-woman tag team match	16:34

=== Day 12 ===
This finals night took place on September 14, 2025.

No.	Results	Stipulations	Times
1	Seri Yamaoka, Hummingbird, Komomo Minami and Yuuka Yamazaki defeated Nao Ishikawa, Minami Yuuki, Nagisa Tachibana and Megaton by pinfall	Eight-woman tag team match	9:02
2	Chika Goto defeated Kizuna Tanaka by pinfall	Star League match in the 2025 Dream Star Grand Prix	7:12
3	Mirai vs. Chanyota ended in a double countout	Star League match in the 2025 Dream Star Grand Prix	5:11
4	Misa Matsui defeated Nagisa Nozaki by pinfall	Star League match in the 2025 Dream Star Grand Prix	5:51
5	Miku Aono vs. Mai Sakurai ended in a time limit draw	Star League match in the 2025 Dream Star Grand Prix	15:00
6	Maria defeated Chiaki by pinfall	Dream League match in the 2025 Dream Star Grand Prix	4:46
7	Mayu Iwatani vs. Victoria Yuzuki ended in a time limit draw	Dream League match in the 2025 Dream Star Grand Prix	15:00
8	Kouki Amarei defeated Utami Hayashishita by countout	Dream League match in the 2025 Dream Star Grand Prix	9:51
9	Miku Aono defeated Victoria Yuzuki by pinfall	Dream Star Grand Prix tournament final	14:48
