= AWG Single Championship =

Japanese women's professional wrestling championship

AWG Singles Championship
- Previous design of the title (2018–2021)

Details
- Promotion: Actwres girl'Z
- Date established: November 15, 2018
- Current champion: Vacant
- Date won: August 29, 2026

Other name
- AgZ Championship (2018)
Statistics
- First champion: Saori Anou
- Most reigns: Rico Fukunaga (2 reigns)
- Longest reign: Miyuki Takase (515 days)
- Shortest reign: Rico Fukunaga (15 days)
- Oldest champion: Mari (38 years, 286 days)
- Youngest champion: Reika Saiki (27 years, 87 days)

The AWG Singles Championship (Japanese: AWGシングル王座, Hepburn: AWG Shinguru Ōza), first established as the AgZ Championship, is a women's professional wrestling championship, situated at the top championship hierarchy of the japanese professional wrestling promotion Actwres girl'Z. In November 2021, Actwres girl'Z announced the dissolution of their Color's and Beginning brands, in favor of a more entertainment-based product. On February 13, 2022, the company ran their first ACTwrestling show under their new format. Therefore, between December 2021 and March 2023, the title was deactivated. After the title's reactivation, there have been 11 reigns shared between 10 different champions, and two vacancies.

Like most professional wrestling championships, the title is won as a result of a scripted match. The championship is currently vacant.

== Title history ==
On November 15, 2018, Saori Anou became the inaugural AgZ Champion after defeating Saki in the finals of a sixteen-woman single-elimination tournament. During Anou's reign the title was re-named to the AWG Single Championship. On September 19, 2019, Reika Saiki, who won the title back in August 14, vacated the title after breaking her jaw, in order to recover from the injury. On November 6, Miyuki Takase defeated Himeka Arita to win the vacant championship. On December 30, 2021, the title was deactivated over Actwres girl'Z closure due to further rebranding.

On March 12, 2023, Miku Aono defeated Kouki in the tournament finals to win the reactivated title.

=== Inaugural tournament (2018) ===
Round 1 September 25, 2018
Himeka Arita	Pin
Hikari Shimizu	8:40
Miku Aono	10:36
Saki	Pin
Mari	Pin
Ina Hazuki	6:25
Miyuki Takase	Pin
Sakuran Bonita	6:43
Kakeru Sekiguchi	Pin
Nao Kakuta	14:30
Tae Honma	Pin
Sayuri Amemiya	4:31
Natsumi Maki	Pin
Momo Tani	4:43
Saori Anou	Pin
Mii	5:06

Quarterfinals; October 9, 2018
Himeka Arita	Pin
Saki	13:46
Mari	14:19
Miyuki Takase	Pin
Kakeru Sekiguchi	Pin
Tae Honma	12:02
Natsumi Maki	8:41
Saori Anou	Pin

Semifinals; October 28 and November 6, 2018
Saki	Pin
Miyuki Takase	13:49
Kakeru Sekiguchi	15:39
Saori Anou	Pin

Final; November 15, 2018
Saki	20:00
Saori Anou	Pin

== Reigns ==
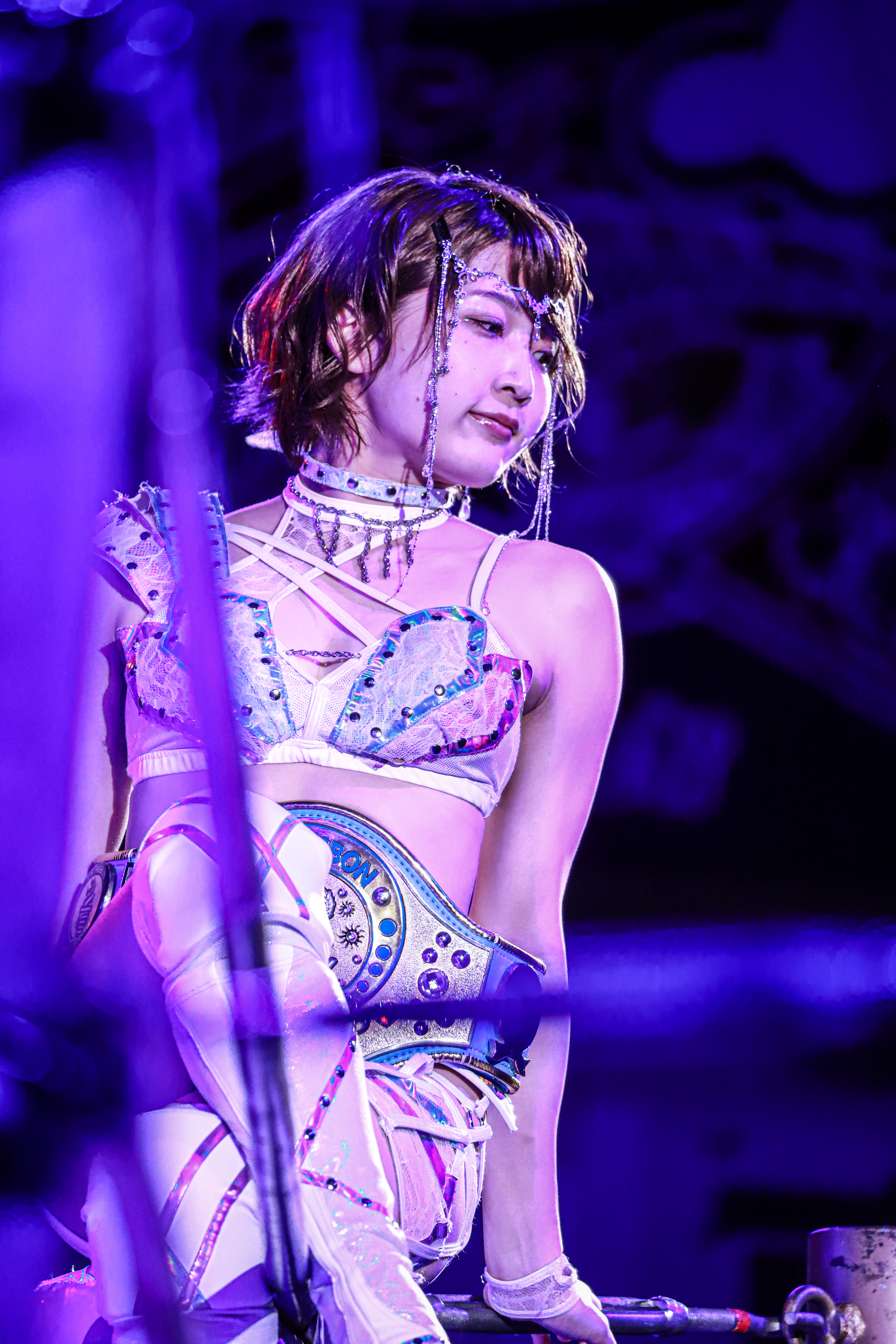
The inaugural AWG Singles Championship Saori Anou

As of October 20, 2026, there have been 11 reigns shared between 10 champions and two vacancies. Saori Anou was the inaugural champion. Miyuki Takase's reign is the longest at 515 days, while Rico Fukunaga's reign is the shortest at 15 days. Mari is the oldest champion at 38 years old, while Saiki is the youngest at 27 years old.

Currently, the title is vacant after Rico Fukunage officially retired on August 29, 2026.

=== Names ===
Name	Years
AgZ Championship	November 15, 2018
AWG Singles Championship	2018 – present

Key
No.	Overall reign number
Reign	Reign number for the specific champion
Days	Number of days held
Defenses	Number of successful defenses
+	Current reign is changing daily

No.	Champion	Championship change			Reign statistics			Notes	Ref.
No.	Champion	Date	Event	Location	Reign	Days	Defenses	Notes	Ref.
1	Saori Anou	November 15, 2018	AgZ Actwres girl'Z in Korakuen	Tokyo, Japan	1	272	4	Defeated Saki in the finals of a sixteen-woman single-elimination tournament to become the inaugural champion. During Anou's reign, the title was re-named to AWG Single Championship.	
2	Reika Saiki	August 14, 2019	Beginning Pro	Tokyo, Japan	1	35	0		
—	Vacated	September 18, 2019	—	—	—	—	—	Reika Saiki vacated the championship after a broken jaw, as she needed to recover from the injury.	
3	Miyuki Takase	November 6, 2019	AgZ Korakuen Hall	Tokyo, Japan	1	515	5	Defeated Himeka Arita to win the vacant championship.	
4	Saki	April 4, 2021	AWG Act in Korakuen Hall	Tokyo, Japan	1	270	3		
—	Deactivated	December 30, 2021	—	—	—	—	—	The championship was deactivated over Actwres girl'Z closure due to further rebranding.	
5	Miku Aono	March 12, 2023	AWG ACTwrestling in Korakuen Hall	Tokyo, Japan	1	292	6	Defeated Kouki in the finals of a tournament to win the reactivated championship.	
6	Mari	December 29, 2023	AWG ACTwrestling in Korakuen Hall	Tokyo, Japan	1	86	1		
7	Natsumi Sumikawa	March 24, 2024	AWG ACTwrestling in Korakuen Hall	Tokyo, Japan	1	22	1		
—	Vacated	April 15, 2024	—	—	—	—	—	Natsumi Sumikawa vacated the championship after she left the promotion.	
8	ACT	August 14, 2024	AWG ACTwrestling in Korakuen Hall	Tokyo, Japan	1	61	0	Defeated Natsuki to win the vacant championship.	
9	Natsuki	October 14, 2024	AWG ACTwrestling in Korakuen Hall	Tokyo, Japan	1	153	4		
10	Marino Saihara	March 16, 2025	AWG ACTwrestling in Korakuen Hall	Tokyo, Japan	1	279	5		
11	Rico Fukunaga	December 20, 2025	AWG ACTwrestling in Osaka	Osaka, Japan	1	131	4		
12	Nagisa Shiotsuki	April 30, 2026	AWG ACTwrestling in Korakuen Hall	Tokyo, Japan	1	106	0		
11	Rico Fukunaga	August 14, 2026	AWG ACTwrestling in Korakuen Hall	Tokyo, Japan	2	15	0		
—	Vacated	August 29, 2026	—	—	—	—	—	Rico Fukunaga vacated the championship after announcing her retirement.	

== Combined reigns ==
As of October 20, 2026.

†	Indicates the current champion

Rank	Wrestler	No. of reigns	Combined defenses	Combined days
1	Miyuki Takase	1	5	515
2	Miku Aono	1	6	292
3	Marino Saihara	1	5	279
4	Saori Anou	1	4	272
5	Saki	1	3	270
6	Natsuki	1	4	153
7	Rico Fukunaga	2	4	146
8	Nagisa Shiotsuki	1	0	106
9	Mari	1	1	86
10	ACT	1	0	61
11	Reika Saiki	1	0	35
12	Natsumi Sumikawa	1	1	22
