= Hikari Shimizu =

Japanese professional wrestler

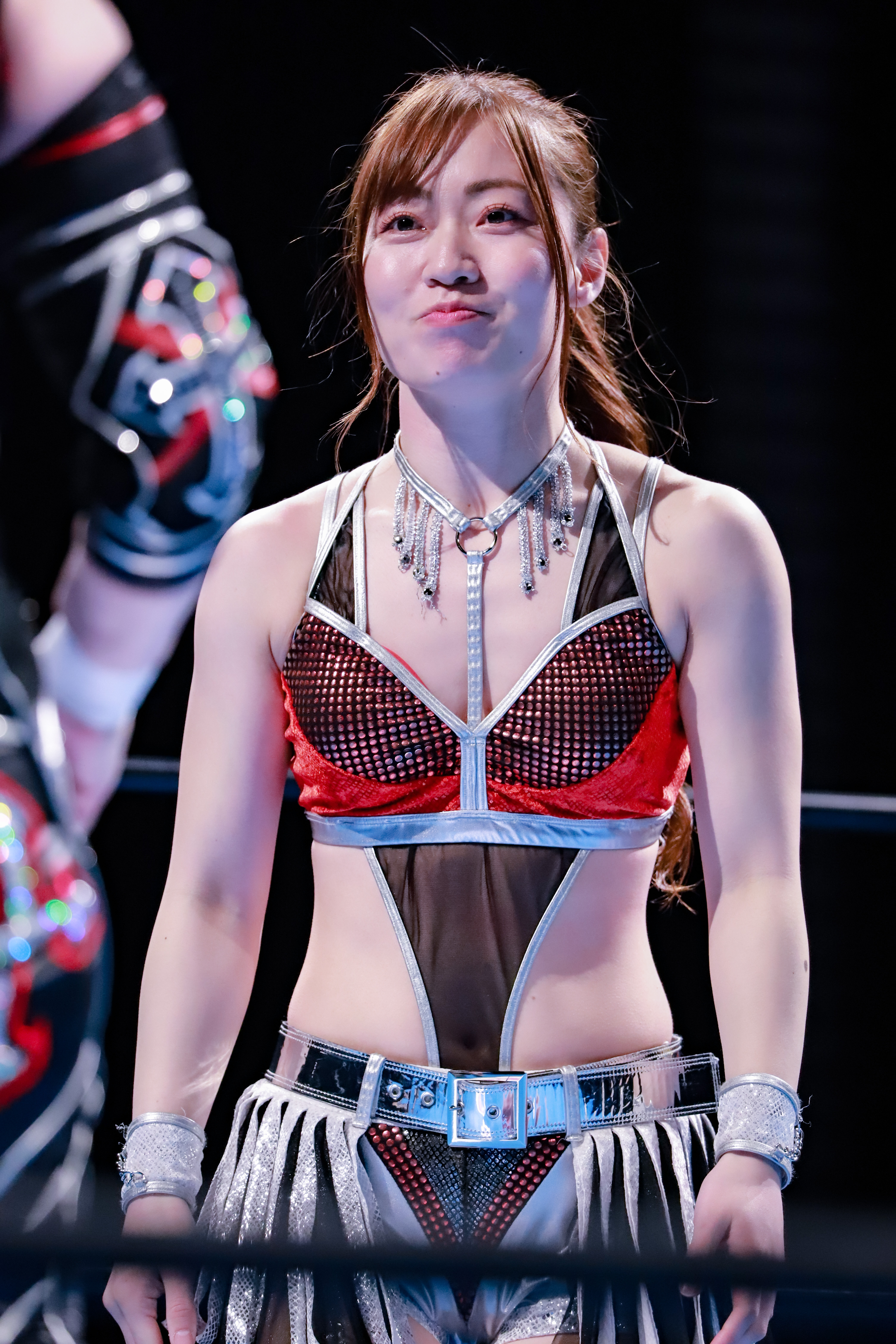
- Shimizu in July 2019

Personal information
- Born: April 22, 1993 (age 33) Uwajima, Japan

Professional wrestling career
- Ring name: Hikari Shimizu
- Billed height: 157 cm (5 ft 2 in)
- Billed weight: 51 kg (112 lb)
- Debut: 2017

Hikari Shimizu (清水ひかり, Shimizu Hikari; born April 22, 1993) is a Japanese professional wrestler currently working as a freelancer and is best known for her tenure with the Japanese promotions Actwres girl'Z and Pro Wrestling Wave.

== Professional wrestling career ==
=== Independent circuit (2017–present) ===
As a freelancer, Shimizu is known for competing in various promotions. At AJPW GROWIN' UP Vol.3, an event promoted by All Japan Pro Wrestling on June 7, 2017, she teamed up with Natsumi Maki in a losing effort to Saori Anou and Miyuki Takase. At DDT Ganbare Pro A Walk In The Park 2018, an event promoted by the GanPro branch of DDT Pro Wrestling on March 21, 2018, she faced Saki in a losing effort. At Odate Wrestling Festival, an event promoted by Pro Wrestling Freedoms on September 22, 2018, Shimizu teamed up with Nao Kakuta in a losing effort to Yuna Manase and Mari. At SEAdLINNNG Sparkling-d!, an event promoted by Seadlinnng on December 13, 2018, she faced Asuka and Chikayo Nagashima in a three-way match.

At Command Bolshoi Final Series Vol. 3 an event produced by Pure-J on February 17, 2019, she teamed up with Tae Honma and unsuccessfully challenged Wanted (Kazuki and Rydeen Hagane) for the Daily Sports Women's Tag Team Championship. At OZ Academy Come Back To Shima!, an event produced by Oz Academy on May 25, 2019, she competed in a 13-woman battle royal won by Itsuki Aoki and also involving Cherry, Himeka Arita, Mayumi Ozaki, Kaori Yoneyama, Rina Yamashita, Tsubasa Kuragaki and others. Later that night she unsuccessfully faced Yoshiko. On June 30, 2019, at W-1 Wrestle-1 Tour Outbreak , Shimizu unsuccessfully competed against Reika Saiki.

=== Actwres girl'Z (2017–present) ===
Shimizu made her professional wrestling debut at AgZ Act 16, an event promoted by Actwres girl'Z on March 5, 2017, where she fell short to Tam Nakano. At Ice Ribbon & Actwres girl'Z Joint Show, a cross-over event produced in partnership with Ice Ribbon on November 16, 2020, Shimizu competed in a gauntlet tag team match in which she teamed up with Ami Miura, Kakeru Sekiguchi, Mari and Saki as "Team AWG" in a losing effort to Team Ice Ribbon (Hiragi Kurumi, Ibuki Hoshi, Matsuya Uno, Totoro Satsuki and Tsukushi Haruka).

=== World Wonder Ring Stardom (2022–2023) ===
At Stardom New Blood 2 on May 13, 2022, after Shimizu's Color's unit stablemates Rina Amikura and Yuko Sakurai picked up a win over Stars members Saya Iida and Momo Kohgo, Tam Nakano rushed to the ring to confront the rest of the Color's members, They set a six-man tag team match for a show on June 5. At Stardom in Korakuen Hall on June 5, 2022, Shimizu teamed up with her Color's stablemates Saki and Yuko Sakurai to fall short to Cosmic Angels' Unagi Sayaka, Tam Nakano and Mina Shirakawa in a loser joins enemy unit. Subsequently, Shimizu, Saki and Sakurai joined Cosmic Angels and announced that they will compete as a sub-unit in the future.

== Championships and accomplishments ==
- Actwres girl'Z
  - Color’s Championship (2 times)
- DDT Pro-Wrestling
  - Ironman Heavymetalweight Championship (1 time)
- Ice Ribbon
  - International Ribbon Tag Team Championship (1 time) – with Saki
- Pro Wrestling Wave
  - Wave Tag Team Championship (2 times) – with Saki
  - Catch the Wave Award (1 time)
    - Best Bout Award (2022) vs. Hanako Nakamori on May 29
