= Marigold Burning Desire 2025 =

2025 Dream Star Fighting Marigold event

- Promotional poster for the event featuring Utami Hayashishita and Takumi Iroha
- Promotion: Dream Star Fighting Marigold
- Date: July 16, 2025
- City: Tokyo, Japan
- Venue: Korakuen Hall
- Attendance: 1,020

Event chronology
← Previous; Shine Forever 2025	Next → Dream Star Grand Prix 2025

Marigold Burning Desire 2025: Night 13 was a professional wrestling event promoted by Dream Star Fighting Marigold. It took place on July 16, 2025, in Tokyo, Japan at the Korakuen Hall. The event aired globally on CyberFight's video-on-demand service Wrestle Universe.

== Production ==
=== Background ===
The show featured professional wrestling matches that result from scripted storylines, where wrestlers portrayed villains, heroes, or less distinguishable characters in the scripted events that built tension and culminated in a wrestling match or series of matches.

=== Event ===
The event started with the eight-woman tag team confrontation between Chika Goto, Nao Ishikawa, Hummingbird and Yuuki Minami, and Miku Aono, Kouki Amarei, Kizuna Tanaka and Erina Yamanaka, bout solded with the victory of the latter team. Next up, Nagisa Nozaki, Chiaki, Misa Matsui and Rea Seto picked up a victory over Mirai, Chanyota, Megaton and Yuuka Yamazaki in another eight-woman tag team bout. The third match saw Victoria Yuzuki and Seri Yamaoka defeat Senka Akatsuki and Sora Ayame in tag team competition. In the fourth bout, Mio Momono and Ai Houzan defeated Mayu Iwatani and Komomo Minami. In the semi main event, Mai Sakurai defeated Riko Kawahata to secure the sixth consecutive defense of the Marigold United National Championship in that respective reign.

In the main event, Utami Hayashishita and Takumi Iroha wrestled into a double knockout, rendering both of them as retainers of their respective titles. As the bout was a winner takes all match disputed for both of the championships, Hayashishita secured the fourth consecutive defense of the Marigold World Championship in that respective reign, while Iroha secured the third for the GHC Women's Championship.

== Results ==
No.	Results	Stipulations	Times
1	Miku Aono, Kouki Amarei, Kizuna Tanaka and Erina Yamanaka defeated Chika Goto, Nao Ishikawa, Hummingbird and Yuuki Minami by pinfall	Eight-woman tag team match	10:47
2	Darkness Revolution (Nagisa Nozaki, Chiaki, Misa Matsui and Rea Seto) defeated Mirai, Chanyota, Megaton and Yuuka Yamazaki by submission	Eight-woman tag team match	9:11
3	Victoria Yuzuki and Seri Yamaoka defeated Senka Akatsuki and Sora Ayame by pinfall	Tag team match	10:34
4	Mio Momono and Ai Houzan defeated Mayu Iwatani and Komomo Minami by pinfall	Tag team match	10:14
5	Mai Sakurai (c) defeated Riko Kawahata by submission	Singles match for the Marigold United National Championship	10:25
6	Utami Hayashishita (World) vs. Takumi Iroha (GHC Women's) ended in a double knockout	Winner Takes All match for the Marigold World Championship and GHC Women's Championship	56:15
(c) / – the champion(s) heading into the match
