= Reika Saiki =

Japanese professional wrestler, bodybuilder, singer and former idol (born 1992)

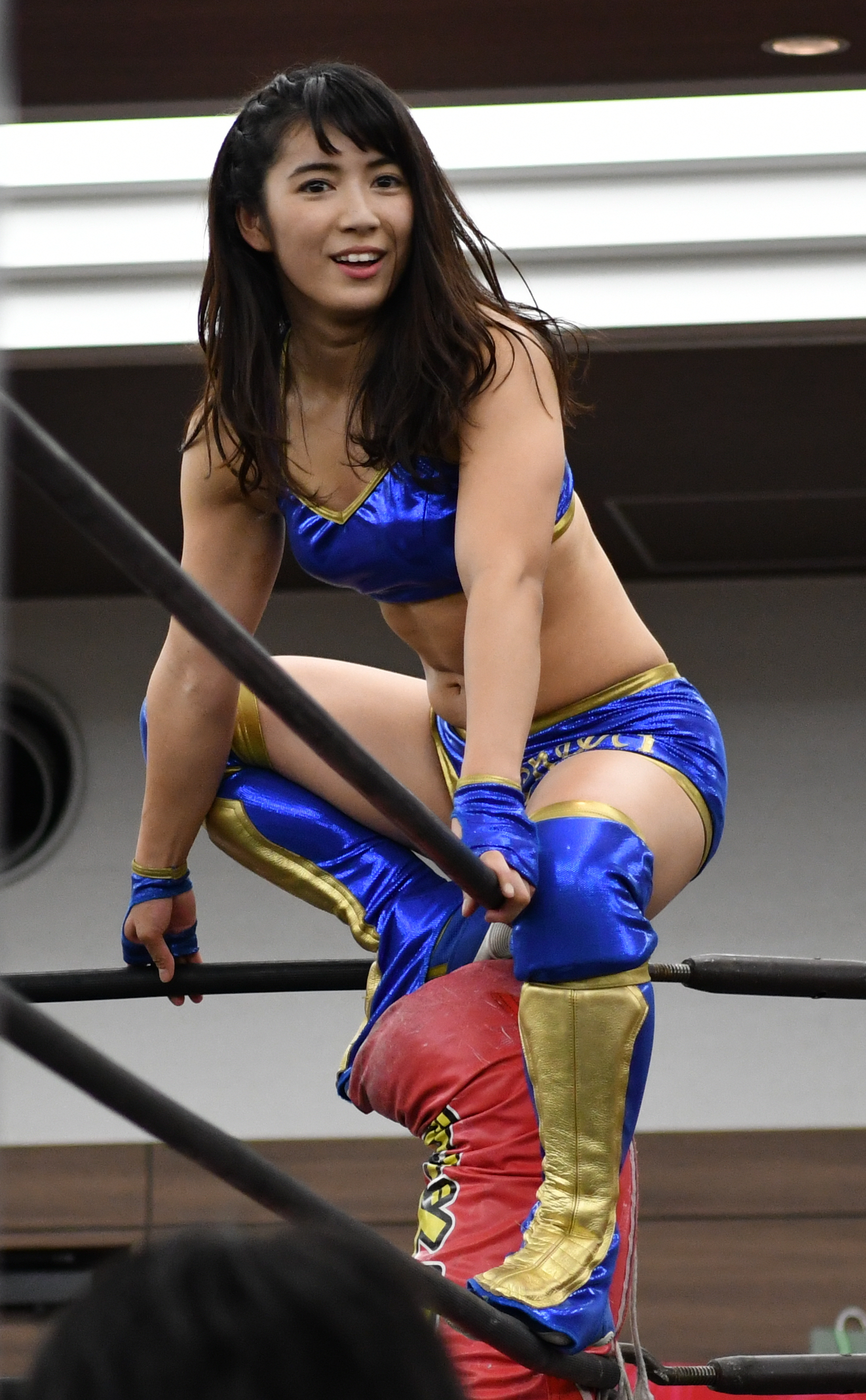
- Saiki in June 2016

Personal information
- Born: Reika Saiki (才木玲佳); May 19, 1992 (age 34) Saitama, Japan
- Education: Keio University
- Spouse: Unknown (m. 2024)
- Children: 1

Professional wrestling career
- Ring name: Reika Saiki
- Billed height: 150 cm (4 ft 11 in)
- Trained by: Akira Nogami; Kaz Hayashi
- Debut: March 30, 2016
- Retired: May 3, 2022

Reika Saiki (才木玲佳, Saiki Reika; born May 19, 1992) is a Japanese actress and former bodybuilder, singer, idol and professional wrestler.

Saiki was trained for a career in pro wrestling in the Wrestle-1 dojo under Akira Nogami and Kaz Hayashi, and made her debut in March 2016. In June of the same year, Saiki debuted in Tokyo Joshi Pro, eventually signing with the promotion later in the year. Outside of professional wrestling, she was also a member of Wrestle-1's cheerleading squad, Cheer♡1, and a member of idol duo Deadlift Lolita with fellow wrestler Ladybeard.

== Professional wrestling career ==
=== Wrestle-1 (2015–2019) ===
Saiki initially joined Wrestle-1 as a member of Cheer♡1, a dance group that performed during and before Wrestle-1 shows. Eventually she began training for a career in professional wrestling in late 2015, joining Wrestle-1's dojo where she trained under Kaz Hayashi and Akira Nogami. She made her debut for the company in March 2016, defeating Hana Kimura. After she began competing for Tokyo Joshi Pro-Wrestling, Saiki's appearances in W-1 became more sporadic, but she continued to make appearances for the promotion until August 2019.

=== Tokyo Joshi Pro-Wrestling (2016–2019) ===
In June 2016, she began competing for Tokyo Joshi Pro Wrestling, a sister company of DDT Pro Wrestling. At DDT's Peter Pan event on August 28, she took part in a battle royal for the Ironman Heavymetalweight Championship, but was unsuccessful. On October 9, she faced veteran Kyoko Kimura in a losing effort. On March 12, 2017, Saiki received her first opportunity at the Tokyo Princess Of Princess Championship, unsuccessfully challenging Yuu. In July 2017, she took part in the Tokyo Princess Cup, defeating Yuu for the first time in the second round. She eventually made it to the final, where she defeated Yuka Sakazaki to win the tournament. On August 26, Saiki defeated Sakazaki once again to win the Tokyo Princess of Princess Championship, the first championship of her career. She made her first successful defence on September 30, defeating Mizuki and once again successfully defended it on November 3 against Rika Tatsumi. She lost the championship to Miyu Yamashita in her third defense on January 4, 2018. On May 3, 2018, Saiki and Marika Kobashi, as "Muscle JK Strikers", defeated Neo Biishiki-gun (Saki-sama and Azusa Christie) to win the Princess Tag Team Championship for the first time. However, they were forced to relinquish the titles later due to Marika sustaining an injury that forced her out of competition for a while. Upon Kobashi's return to the ring, they were unsuccessful in their bid to win the titles back from Mizuki and Yuka Sakazaki on February 23, 2019. On August 14, she defeated Saori Anou to win Actwres girl'Z's AgZ Championship, becoming the second holder of the title. Her reign would be short-lived, however, as she would suffer a broken jaw competing for AWG on August 29, and would vacate the championship the following month.

=== Retirement ===
Following her injury, and in spite of a full recovery, Saiki became inactive and did not wrestle for over two years in the aftermath. On March 26, 2022, she formally announced her retirement from both pro wrestling and bodybuilding, citing her wish to pursue a career in acting. She retired from bodybuilding five days after the announcement, on March 31. Her retirement match took place on May 3 at Tokyo Joshi Pro-Wrestling's "Yes! Wonderland" event. The three-minute exhibition match against Arisu Endo ended in a time-limit draw.

== Other media ==
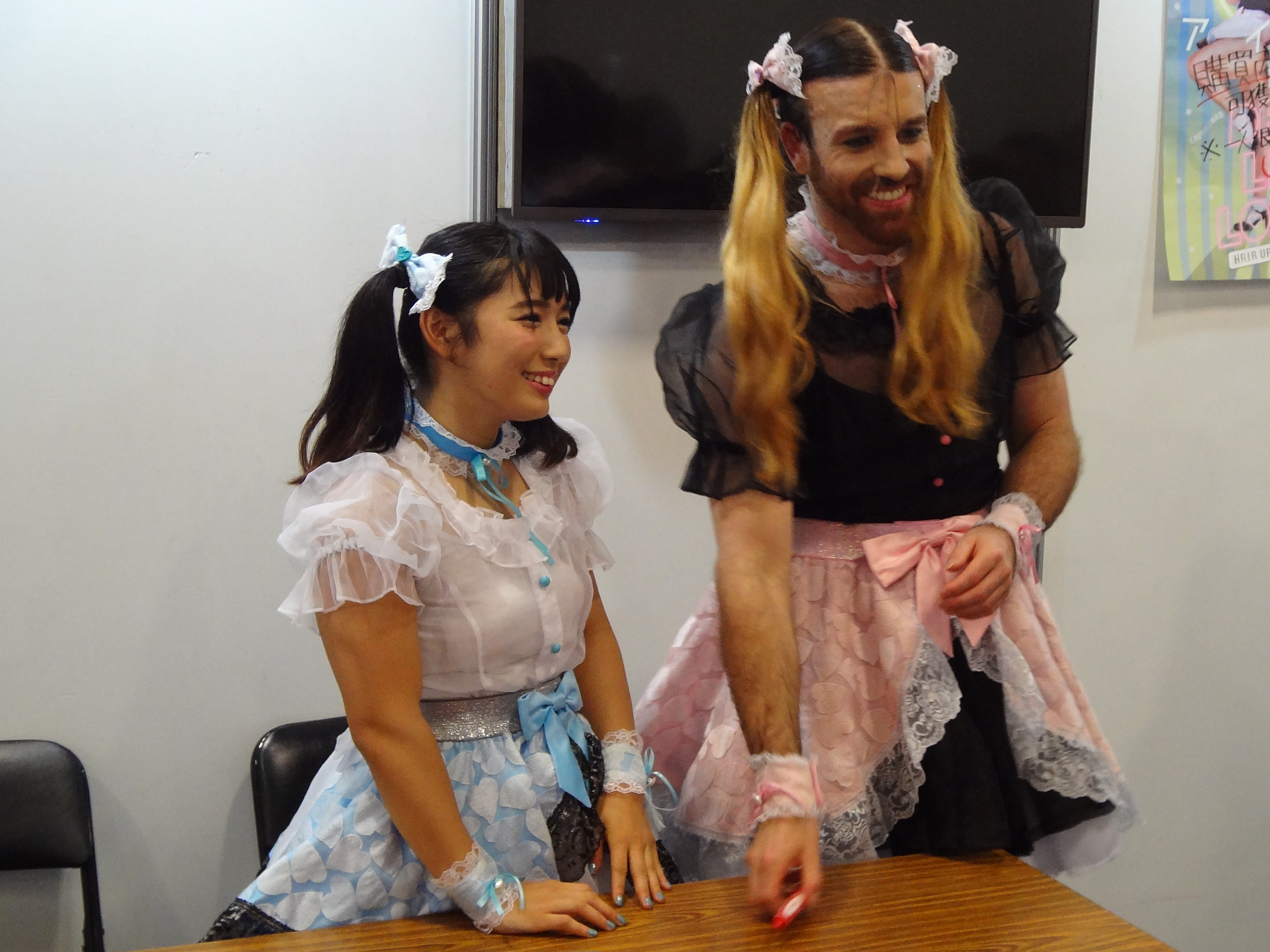
Saiki (left) along with Ladybeard in August 2017

Outside of professional wrestling, Saiki was a member of the kawaii metal group Deadlift Lolita with fellow wrestler Ladybeard.

On November 21, 2022, her autobiography, Muscle Graduation – Be True to Yourself, was released.

== Personal life ==
On November 2, 2024, Saiki announced her marriage to a ordinary man. On December 15, 2025, Saiki announced on her Instagram that she is expecting the couple's first child. She gave birth on April 21, 2026. The gender of the baby was not disclosed.

=== Health ===
On April 28, 2025, Saiki revealed that she had been diagnosed with uterine fibroids and was hospitalized and had undergone surgery to remove them.

== Championships and accomplishments ==
- Actwres girl'Z
  - AWG Single Championship (1 time)
- Tokyo Joshi Pro Wrestling
  - Tokyo Princess of Princess Championship (1 time)
  - Tokyo Princess Tag Team Championship (1 time) – with Marika Kobashi
  - Tokyo Princess Cup (2017)

== Bibliography ==
Title	Release date	Publisher	Notes	ISBN
Muscle Graduation – Be True to Yourself (筋肉卒業―自分の心に正直になろう―, Kin'niku sotsugyō ― jibun no kokoro ni shōjiki ni narou ―)	November 21, 2022	Baseball Magazine-sha	Autobiography	ISBN 978-4583115481
