= Act Yasukawa =

Japanese professional wrestler

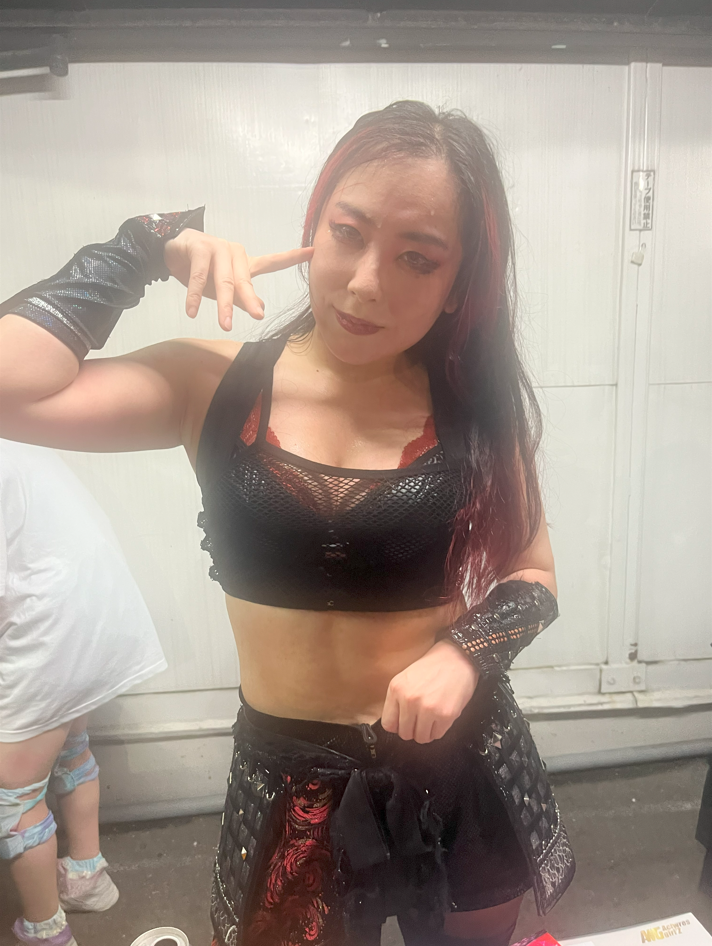
- Yasukawa in July 2024

Personal information
- Born: Yuka Yasukawa; November 13, 1986 (age 39) Misawa, Aomori, Japan

Professional wrestling career
- Ring name(s): Act; Act Ranger; Act Yasukawa; Wild Bunny
- Billed height: 1.64 m (5 ft 4 1/2 in)
- Billed weight: 60 kg (132 lb)
- Trained by: Fuka Kakimoto
- Debut: February 5, 2012

Yuka Yasukawa (安川結花, Yasukawa Yuka; born November 13, 1986), better known by the ring name Act Yasukawa (安川惡斗, Yasukawa Akuto), and currently performing under the mononym Act (惡斗, Akuto), is a Japanese professional wrestler. She currently wrestles for Actwres girl'Z.

Making her pro wrestling debut in 2012, she wrestled exclusively for the joshi puroresu promotion Stardom. Yasukawa's career ultimately ended in December 2015, 10 months after she participated in a match against Yoshiko for the World of Stardom Championship, wherein she was legitimately assaulted and injured by her opponent, suffering fractured cheek, nasal and orbital bones. The incident received mainstream attention in Japan and became known as the Seisan Matchi (凄惨マッチ; "Ghastly Match") in the aftermath.

Yasukawa was known for temporarily incorporating the blindness in her right eye, an effect of Graves' Disease, into her persona by wearing an eyepatch. She was also known for commonly carrying a bottle of rum to the ring to spit at people as part of her performance.

She returned to professional wrestling as a performer May 2021, working regularly for Actwres girl'Z sub-brand Action RING Girls as Hisen, before wrestling in Actwres girl'Z as Wild Bunny. On October 3, 2022, Wild Bunny would "go on hiatus" when Yasukawa would return under the name ACT after Wild Bunny's mask was attempted to be ripped off by Naru, awakening ACT once again.

== Professional wrestling career ==
=== World Wonder Ring Stardom (2012–2016) ===
Yasukawa in March 2013

Yasukawa made her pro wrestling debut On February 5, 2012, in a winning effort against Yuri Haruka at the Shin-Kiba 1st Ring in Tokyo, Japan.

In the first month of 2013, Yasukawa captured her first pro wrestling championship alongside tag team partners Natsuki☆Taiyo and Saki Kashima. The trio won a tournament to decide the inaugural Artist of Stardom Champions. However, the team was forced to vacate their title three months later as a result of Act Yasukawa injuring her cervical spine.

On November 4, 2013, Yasukawa defeated Dark Angel to win the Wonder of Stardom Championship in the puroresu-honored venue, Korakuen Hall. Yasukawa retained the championship until June 2014, when she was forced to vacate the title due to thyroid deterioration related to Graves' Disease. During this time, Yasukawa underwent cataract surgery. While in recovery, Yasukawa continued to be involved in Stardom shows by selling merchandise and being part of the ring crew.

Yasukawa returned to the ring on December 7, 2014, teaming up with Kellie Skater in a losing effort against Kairi Hojo and Koguma.

At the Stardom 4th Anniversary Show at Korakuen Hall, Yasukawa defeated Mayu Iwatani to win her second Wonder of Stardom Championship. She is the first of only three people thus far to hold the title twice.

On February 22, 2015, Yasukawa was scheduled to challenge Yoshiko for the World of Stardom Championship in the main event of a Korakuen Hall show. However, the match resulted in a no contest when Yoshiko began to shoot on Yasukawa, legitimately assaulting her to the point that the match had to be stopped. Following the match, Yasukawa, with a bloody and badly swollen face, was rushed to a Tokyo hospital, where she was diagnosed with fractured cheek, nasal and orbital bones, which would require surgery. The incident received mainstream attention in Japan and became known as Seisan Matchi (凄惨マッチ; "Ghastly Match").

On May 1, Yasukawa was forced to vacate the Wonder of Stardom Championship due to the facial fractures inflicted on her earlier in the year. Yasukawa eventually returned to the ring on September 23, 2015. At Mask Fiesta 2015 on October 25, Yasukawa, wrestling under the ring name Act Ranger, defeated Kairian 2.0. On December 1, Yasukawa announced she would retire from professional wrestling on December 23. In her retirement match, Yasukawa and Kyoko Kimura defeated Haruka Kato and Kairi Hojo. Afterwards, Yasukawa continued working for Stardom as the manager of the Oedo Tai stable.

=== Actwres girl’Z (2021–present) ===
On December 13, 2021, Yasukawa teamed with Saori Anou against Natsuki and Natsumi Sumikawa at a Actwres girl'Z event, bringing back the Act Yasukawa character in-ring for the first time since her retirement at Year End Climax 2015. At Actwres, Yasukawa at times performed under a masked persona named Wild Bunny, first making an appearance on February 13, 2022, before performing as Act. As Actwres entered its new era in 2022, Act formed a villainous unit named Beastz Rebellion, alongside Ayano Irie and Riko Fukunaga.

On August 14, 2023, Act challenged Miku Aono for the AWG Single Championship, her first time competing for a title in years; however, was unsuccessful. Exactly one year later, on August 14, 2024, Act defeated Natsuki to claim the vacant AWG Single Championship at Korakuen Hall. On October 14, Act failed in her first defense of the championship, losing a rematch with Natsuki.

== Personal life ==
Yasukawa was born in Misawa, but her family moved regularly due to her father's work in the Japan Self-Defense Forces.

As a child, Yasukawa dreamed of becoming a samurai. Her parents supported her passion by guiding her into Kendo. However, when Yasukawa reached middle school she was informed there were no samurai in modern Japan. During this time, Yasukawa suffered from a near-blindness in her right eye, mental illness, and bullying. At some point during her childhood, Yasukawa attempted suicide. In high school, Yasukawa found solace by joining the drama club:

I am a loner, but with acting, I could be anything that I wanted to be. I could be the action hero that I dreamed of. I couldn’t be a samurai in real life, but I could be one in film.

Yasukawa attended the Japan Institute of the Moving Image. After being cast in the 2011 stage production of Wrestler Girls, Yuzuki Aikawa approached Yasukawa and offered her a chance to audition as a wrestler for Stardom. She agreed, but after training for only three months, Yasukawa fell ill and was advised by her doctor not to wrestle. Instead, Yasukawa chose to take medication that can leave her infertile but strengthen her body enough that she would be cleared to join Stardom.

In her free time, she enjoys cooking and gardening.

Yasukawa's life was the subject of the 2015 Japanese documentary Gamushara.

== Championships and accomplishments ==
- Actwres girl'Z
  - AWG Singles Championship (1 time)
  - AWG Tag Team Championship (1 time) - with Mari
  - ACT GAME Tag Tournament - with Mari
- World Wonder Ring Stardom
  - Artist of Stardom Championship (1 time, inaugural) – with Natsuki☆Taiyo and Saki Kashima
  - Wonder of Stardom Championship (2 time)
  - Goddesses of Stardom Tag League (2013) – with Kyoko Kimura
  - 5★Star GP Award (1 time)
    - 5★Star GP Outstanding Performance Award (2012)
  - Stardom Year-End Award (3 times)
    - Best Technique Award (2012)
    - Fighting Spirit Award (2013, 2015)
