= Actwres girl'Z =

Japanese women's wrestling promotion

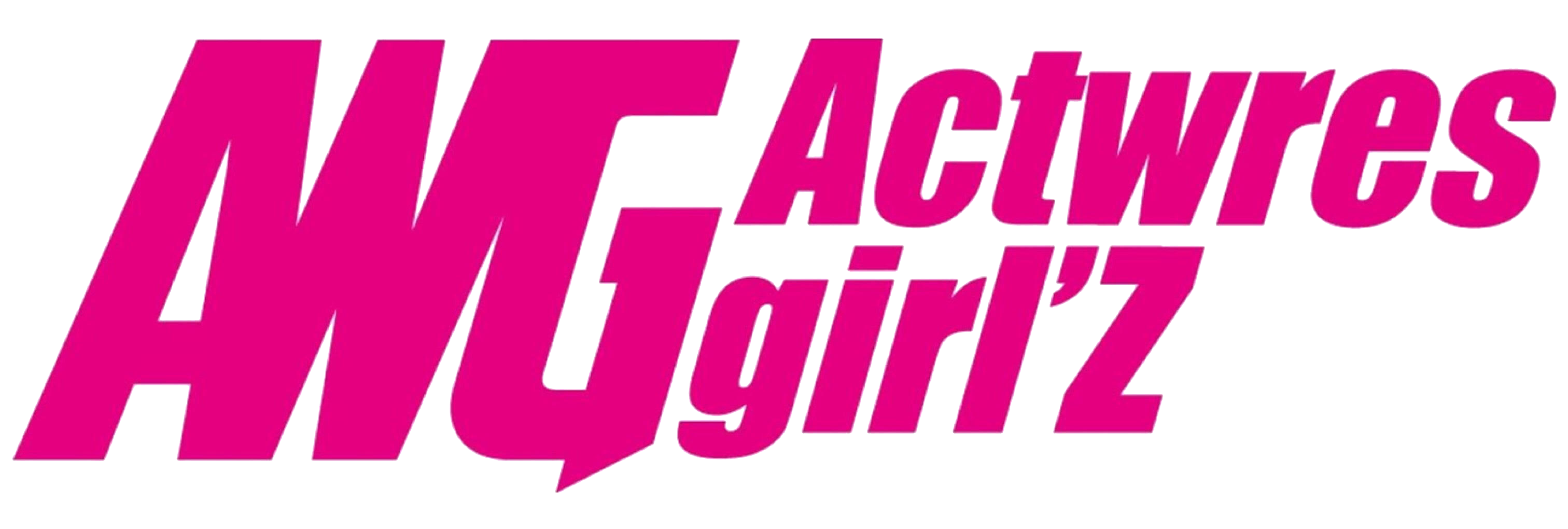
- Acronym: AWG
- Founded: 2015
- Style: Theatre Action
- Headquarters: Tokyo, Japan
- Owner: Super Project Co. Ltd
- Website: www.actwresgirlz.com

Actwres girl'Z is a Japanese independent sports entertainment organization and former professional wrestling promotion founded in 2015. The meaning of the "Actwres Girl'Z" name is a combination of the words "wrestler" and "actress".

== History ==
Actwres girl'Z was founded in 2015 under a similar concept to JDStar's "Athress" . The promotion's roster is currently made up mostly of Japanese idols and other members of the entertainment industry. The promotion's first show was held on May 31, 2015, at Shin-Kiba 1st Ring. On August 7, 2016, former All Japan Women's Pro-Wrestling star Yumiko Hotta was appointed as an advisor. In 2018, the promotion worked together with Hello Kitty and ran a show at the Japanese Hello Kitty themed amusement park, Sanrio Puroland. 2018 continued to be a landmark year for the promotion as they had their first ever show at Korakuen Hall. The promotion initially only ran a few events per year, but grew to having multiple events per month with a record of 32 events in 2018. The group while initially only running in Tokyo, Japan has since held events in Osaka, Nagoya and Saitama.

In 2019, the company officially split into two brands, Beginning and Color's. Beginning was a more traditional wrestling brand with more experienced wrestlers, while Color's featured more rookie wrestlers. This signified a shift and acted as a bit of a soft reboot for Actwres girl'Z.

As of May 2020, Actwres girl’Z have launched their own VOD service available on tablet, smartphone, or computer.

In 2020, Actwres girl'Z launched Action Ring Girl'Z, a "pro wrestling action fantasy". The project is more entertainment focused, and features factions of space pirates, samurai, and magical girls in search of three sacred treasures.

In November 2021, Actwres girl'Z announced the dissolution of their Color's and Beginning brands, in favor of a more entertainment-based product. On February 13, 2022, the company ran their first ACTwrestling show under their new format of no longer being pro wrestling but a theatrical performance based on pro wrestling.

On July 3, 2023, a business partnership with Best Body Japan Pro Wrestling was announced. This ceased in March 2024.

On December 15, 2023, a business partnership with All Japan Pro Wrestling was announced where "Actwres Time" would be held usually as the pre-show featuring a dance opening along with a showcase match performance.

In April 2024 a mass exodus happened as 6 major talents left the promotion along with the at the time advisor Fuka, due to this Actwres girl'z was almost shut down in the process however it was decided to continue on in a new direction. On June 14, 2024, a new chapter was written as a video aired explaining the new storyline "In April 2024, Actress World appears to have been destroyed by an alien extraction bomb. However, the people of Actress World are not dead. What remains of Actress World is changing into a world ruled by violence" Along with the narration, the players who had left were shown to have been abducted by UFOs and a new Heel group was formed in the "Actwres Killer'Z" led by MARU along with ACT, Mari, Yufa, Great Asako and more to display this violent style. A face group "Hero Army" was formed to fight them off led by Marino Saihara and featuring Naru, Sakura Mizushima, Kanamic and more.

In July 2024, Princess Tenko was named as an ambassador of Actwres girl'Z with her debut appearance set for August 14 at Korakuen Hall.

On October 1, 2024, Princess Tenko's white lion, King, was named as commissioner of Actwres girl'Z alternate singles title. This belt was announced as "KING of RING Entertainment Championship".

== Roster ==
=== Performers ===
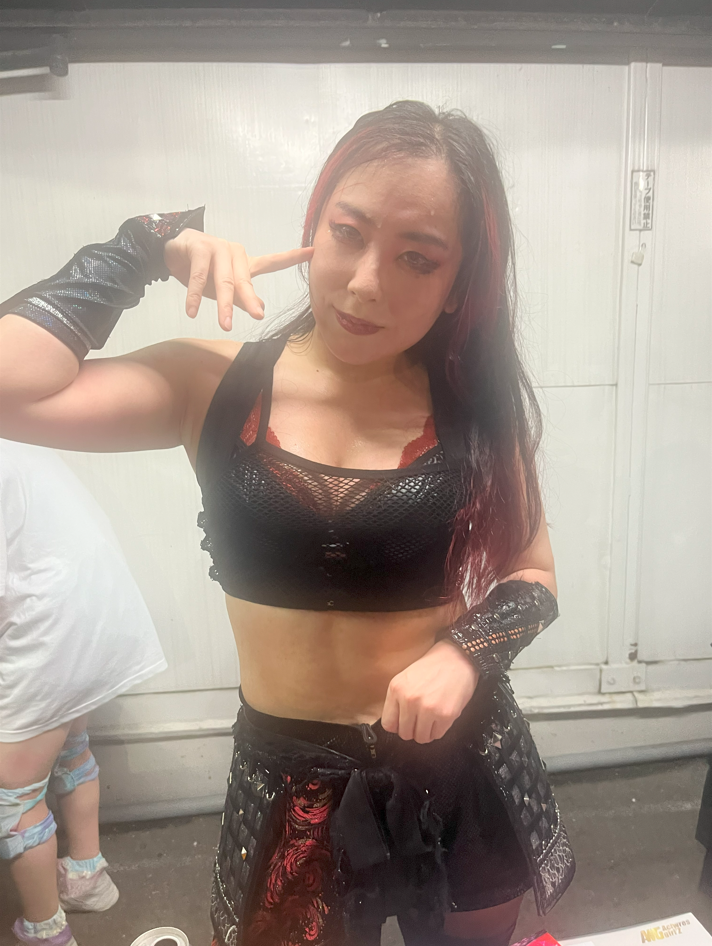
ACT

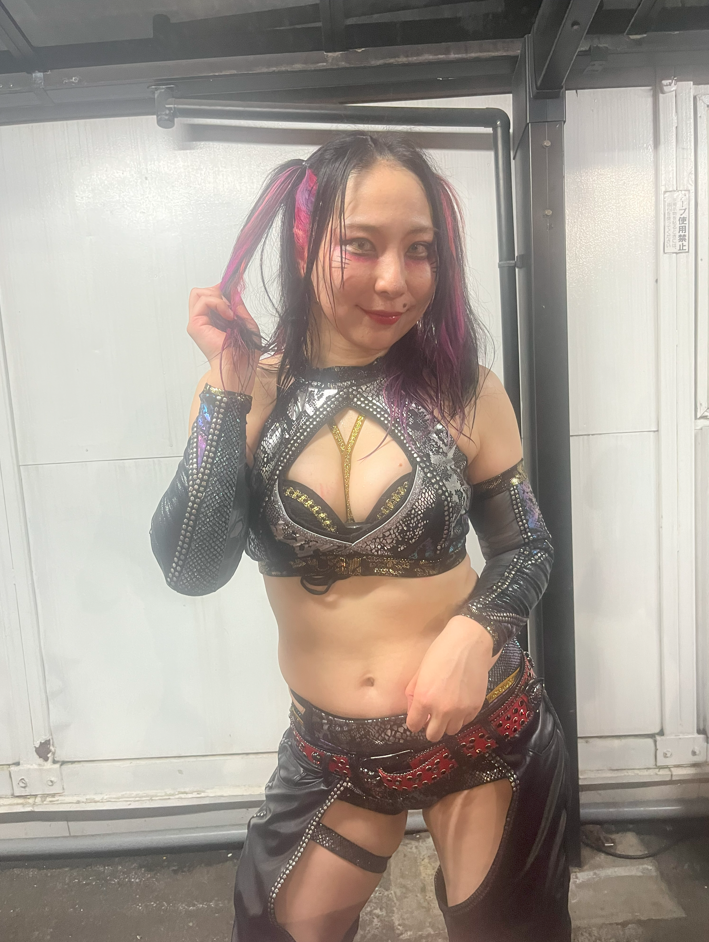
Mari

Ring name	Real name	Unit	Notes
ACT	Yuka Yasukawa	Actwres Killer'Z, BEASTZ Rebellion	Also performs as Wild Bunny, with beacon.lab entertainment, Inactive; unknown injury
Anri	Anri Yamada	Superhuman Asako Army	
Asako Mia	Unknown	Superhuman Asako Army (L)	2025 Pumpkin Queen, also performs as Great Asako as a member of Actwres Killer'Z
Ayano Irie	Unknown	Actwres Killer'Z, BEASTZ Rebellion	KING of Ring Entertainment Champion
Chii Aoba	Unknown	Superhuman Asako Army	with coelacanth factory
Erisa Nagai	Unknown	Superhuman Asako Army	
Gonbe	Unknown	Unaffiliated	Also performs as Lady Police Gonbe
Haruka Ishikawa	Unknown	Actwres Killer'Z	
Hinata Senya	Unknown	Actwres Killer'Z	with Lady Happiness
Kana Yafuku	Unknown	Genki Sentai Actwres 5	
Kyoka Iwai	Unknown	Actwres Killer'Z, Jadoshu	With Mizuiro Kakumei
Mari	Mari Sakamoto	Actwres Killer'Z	First AWG Triple Crown Champion, with AST Action
Marino Nishimura	Unknown	Genki Sentai Actwres 5	
Marino Saihara	Unknown	Genki Sentai Actwres 5 (L)	AWG Tag Champion
MARU	Miwa Maruyama	Actwres Killer'Z (L), Jadoshu (L)	with Mizuiro Kakumei
Mugi Kakuhen	Unknown	Unaffiliated	
Nagisa Shiotsuki	Unknown	Unaffiliated	
Nanami Togi	Unknown	Actwres Killer'Z	With Mizuiro Kakumei
Naru	Unknown	Unaffiliated	Also performs as Ninja Girl Uran
Nene Arahata	Unknown	Actwres Killer'Z, Beastz Rebellion	
Rico Fukunaga	Unknown	Genki Sentai Actwres 5	Also performs as Rico LEE
Rio	Unknown	Jadoshu	
Sakura Mizushima	Unknown	Genki Sentai Actwres 5	with coelacanth factory
Saya Matsuzaki	Unknown	Unaffiliated	
Toiro Hina	Unknown	Superhuman Asako Army	
Yukina Uehara	Unknown	Superhuman Asako Army	AWG Tag Champion
Yuri Yamane	Unknown	Unaffiliated	

=== Tag Teams ===
Tag Team Name	Tag Member 1	Tag Member 2	Notes
155	Marino Saihara	Naru	
Amaterasu	ACT	Mari	Officially formed on May 3, 2024
Chinamako	MARU	Great Asako	
HaraHara RED	Marino Saihara	Yukina Uehara	AWG Tag Team Champions
Heart Sakura Mochi	Sakura Mizushima	Naru	
Hundred Flowers Shower	Haruka Ishikawa	Kyoka Iwai	
MRC	Marino Saihara	Rico Fukunaga	
Osatsuma	Ayano Irie	Nene Arahata	Labeled under Beastz Rebellion
Polaris★	Anri	Erisa Nagai	
Risole	Yukina Uehara	Toiro Hina	
Twin Stars	Ayano Irie	Mii	
Vivace	Nanami Togi	Chii Aoba	

=== Action Ring Girl'Z ===
Role	Played By	Unit	Notes
Ado	Naru	Space Pirates Sheloll	
Anb	Ayaka Tsukishiro	Bijou	
Bell	Erisa Nagai	Satan The Works Co., Ltd	
Captain Carina	Mari	Space Pirates Sheloll	
Cocotte Heart	Sakura Mizushima	Star magical☆project	
Corne	Gonbe	Satan The Works Co., Ltd	
Dia	Yukina Uehara	Bijou	Previously played by Miku Aono
Émé	Nagisa Shiotsuki	Bijou	
Emilia	Miho Ishizuka	Satan The Works Co., Ltd	
Hakuju	KYANREN	Kaguya	
Hinata	Toiro Hina	Kaguya	Previously played by Naho Yamada
Hisen	ACT	Kaguya	
Merjelly	Nene Arahata	Space Pirates Sheloll	Accompanied by Pyxis, the parrot
Momo	Anri	Kaguya	Previously played by Marina Hamada
Pantsai	Asako Mia	Taofasyue (kakkokari)	
Rinrin	Ayano Irie	Taofasyue (kakkokari)	
Ryza	MARU	Satan The Works Co., Ltd	
Spil	Yui Tensho	Bijou	
Sylvia	Nanami Togi	Satan The Works Co., Ltd	
Thys	Rico Fukunaga	Bijou	
Tiger-chen	Haruka Ishikawa	Taofasyue (kakkokari)	
Tokiwa	Sakura Nishio	Kaguya	Previously played by Ami Miura & KIRA☆AN

=== Staff ===
Ring name	Real name	Notes
Atsushi Ishiguro	Unknown	Referee
Banny Oikawa	Unknown	Referee
Keiji Sakaguchi	Unknown	AWG Representative
Mizuka Arai	Unknown	Ring announcer, member of Actwres Killer'Z
Princess Tenko	Tenko Hikita II	AWG Special Observer
Yui Tensho	Yui Yoshino	Ring announcer, graduated from in-ring competition on December 29, 2025

== Alumni ==
Ring name	Real name	Notes
Allen	Unknown	Graduated March 29, 2024.
Ami Miura	Unknown	Joined Stardom as Ami Sohrei on March 29, 2022.
Arisa Hoshiki	Arisa Hoshiki	Briefly competed in AgZ, was the leader of now defunct faction Red Fragment.
Asahi	Unknown	Passed away on February 1, 2024.
Ayumi Hayashi	Unknown	Retired after the dissolution of the Color's brand.
Cherry	Unknown	Competed in AgZ Color's as Sakuran Bonita.
Hikari Shimizu	Unknown	Member of GPU COLOR'S.
Kakeru Sekiguchi	Unknown	Freelancing as of January 1, 2022.
KIRA☆AN	Unknown	Graduated August 14, 2024.
KYANREN	Kyan Ren	Also performed as Ren and Rensan
Mai Sakurai	Mai Sakurai	Debuted in Stardom on August 13, 2021.
Maika Ozaki	Unknown	Founding member of AgZ, currently a freelancer.
Mana Yamashita	Unknown	
Maya Fukuda	Maya Fukuda	Left AgZ on June 27, 2022. Now competes in Stardom under the name Kiyoka Kotatsu.
Michiko Miyagi	Tomoko Miyagi	Currently a member of GLEAT.
Mii	Unknown	Graduated October 31, 2025.
Miho Ishizuka	Unknown	
Miyuki Takase	Unknown	Freelancing as of January 1, 2022.
Momo Kohgo	Unknown	Debuted in Stardom on January 23, 2022.
Momo Tani	Unknown	Joined Pure-J on January 1, 2022.
Nao Kakuta	Nao Kakuta	Founding member of AgZ, joined Tokyo Joshi Pro Wrestling on November 14, 2020.
Natsuki	Unknown	Graduated May 2, 2026.
Natsumi Maki	Unknown	Founding member of AgZ, joined Tokyo Joshi Pro Wrestling on January 4, 2019.
Noa Igarashi	Unknown	Retired August 13, 2021.
Reika Saiki	Unknown	Participated as a member of Wrestle-1 and won the AgZ championship.
Riko Kawahata	Unknown	Currently a member of Marvelous.
Rina Amikura	Unknown	Member of GPU COLOR'S.
Saki	Saki Watanabe	Founder of GPU COLOR'S.
Tam Nakano	Yuria Tauchi	Joined Stardom in November 2017. Retired in 2025
Saori Anou	Unknown	Founding member of AgZ, currently a freelancer.
Tae Honma	Unknown	Founding member of AgZ, freelancing as of January 1, 2022.
Waka Tsukiyama	Unknown	Debuted in Stardom on September 4, 2021.
Yoshiko Hasegawa	Unknown	Left AgZ on December 31, 2021. Currently a member of TJPW. Set to retire in July
Yuko Sakurai	Unknown	Member of GPU COLOR'S.
Yuna Manase	Yuna Suzuki	Made her last appearance as a roster member at AgZ Act 14 on December 27, 2016.
Yumiko Hotta	Yumiko Hotta	Former advisor to AgZ, left the promotion in July 2020.
Cat Mask calico	Unknown	Joined Marigold as Hummingbird on October 24，2024.
Chiaki	Chiaki Kanahama	Joined Marigold on April 30，2024.
Chika Goto	Unknown	Joined Marigold on April 30，2024.
Kouki	Unknown	Joined Marigold as Kouki Amarei on April 30，2024.
Miku Aono	Unknown	Joined Marigold on April 30，2024.
Misa Matsui	Unknown	Joined Marigold on April 30，2024.
Natsumi Sumikawa	Natsumi Tokoda	Joined Marigold as Natsumi Showzuki on April 30，2024.
Yufa	Yuka Kobe	Retired March 16, 2025
Yumi Agawa	Unknown	Ring Announcer from 2020 to 2025, left on June 1, 2025

== Championships ==
As of November 2, 2026

=== Active ===
Championship	Current champion(s)	Reign	Date won	Days held	Location	Notes
AWG Singles Championship	Vacant		August 14, 2026	80+	Korakuen Hall	Rico Fukunaga defeated Nagisa Shiotsuki then immediately retired, vacating the championship.
KING of Ring Entertainment Championship	Ayano Irie	1	August 14, 2026	80+	Korakuen Hall	Defeated Sakura Mizushima
AWG Tag Team Championship	HaraHara RED (Marino Saihara and Yukina Uehara)	1	October 19, 2025	379+	176BOX	Defeated Sakura Mizushima and Rico Fukunaga, began as an interim reign until Amaterasu's six-month inactivity expired on April 13, 2026.

=== KING of Ring Entertainment Championship ===
KING of Ring Entertainment Championship

Details
- Promotion: Actwres girl'Z
- Date established: October 10, 2024
- Current champion: Ayano Irie
- Date won: August 14, 2026
Statistics
- First champion: Mari
- Most reigns: Sakura Mizushima (2)
- Longest reign: Nagisa Shiotsuki (202 days)
- Shortest reign: Sakura Mizushima (35 days)
- Oldest champion: MARU (44 years, 244 days)
- Youngest champion: Sakura Mizushima (28 years, 64 days)

The KING of Ring Entertainment Championship is a professional wrestling championship serving as a secondary title for Actwres girl'Z. It was named after Princess Tenko's white lion, King, who also serves as the official commissioner for Actwres girl'Z. There have been a total of six reigns shared between five different champions.

The current champion is Ayano Irie, who is in her first reign. She defeated Sakura Mizusima on August 14, 2026 in Tokyo, Japan.

Key
No.	Overall reign number
Reign	Reign number for the specific champion
Days	Number of days held
Defenses	Number of successful defenses
<1	Reign lasted less than a day
+	Current reign is changing daily

No.	Champion	Championship change			Reign statistics			Notes	Ref.
No.	Champion	Date	Event	Location	Reign	Days	Defenses	Notes	Ref.
1	Mari	October 14, 2024	AWG ACTwrestling in Korakuen Hall	Tokyo, Japan	1	153	5	Defeated Sakura Mizushima to become the inaugural champion.	
2	Sakura Mizushima	March 16, 2025	AWG ACTwrestling in Korakuen Hall	Tokyo, Japan	1	199	5		
3	MARU	October 1, 2025	AWG ACTwrestling in Tokyo Dome City	Tokyo, Japan	1	80	3		
4	Nagisa Shiotsuki	December 20, 2025	AWG ACTwrestling in Osaka	Osaka, Japan	1	202	4		
5	Sakura Mizushima	July 10, 2026	AWG ACTwrestling in Korakuen Hall	Tokyo, Japan	2	35	1		
6	Ayano Irie	August 14, 2026	AWG ACTwrestling in Korakuen Hall	Tokyo, Japan	1	80+	0		

==== Combined reigns ====
As of November 2, 2026.

†	Indicates the current champion

Rank	Wrestler	No. of reigns	Combined defenses	Combined days
1	Sakura Mizushima	2	6	234
2	Nagisa Shiotsuki	1	4	202
3	Mari	1	5	153
4	MARU	1	3	80
5	Ayano Irie †	1	0	80+

=== AWG Tag Team Championship ===
AWG Tag Team Championship

Details
- Promotion: Actwres girl'Z
- Date established: February 11, 2021
- Date retired: December 30, 2021
Statistics
- First champions: Maika Ozaki and Tae Honma
- Final champions: Kakeru Sekiguchi and Miku Aono
- Most reigns: All titleholders (1 reign)
- Longest reign: Maika Ozaki and Tae Honma (183 days)
- Oldest champion: Tae Honma (34 years, 297 days)
- Youngest champion: Kakeru Sekiguchi (26 years, 320 days)

The AWG Tag Team Championship (Japanese: AWGタッグ王座, Hepburn: AWG Taggu Ōza) is a tag team championship created and promoted by the Japanese promotion Actwres girl'Z. There have been a total of four reigns shared between four different teams, consisting of eight distinctive champions. It was originally retired in December 2021 due to Actwres girl'Z closure. Eventually, it was confirmed in 2025 that a tag team tournament called "ACT GAME" would take place, with the winners becoming the new AWG Tag Team Champions. In the finals of the tournament, Amaterasu (ACT and Mari) would defeat MRC (Marino Saihara and Rico Fukunaga) on August 13, 2025, to win the reactivated championships.

The current champions are Marino Saihara and Yukina Uehara, who are in their first reign. They originally defeated Sakura Mizushima and Rico Fukunaga to become the Interim champions after ACT went on hiatus. On April 13, 2016, they would be recognized as the official champions after Amaterasu's six-month reign expired due to inactivity.

Key
No.	Overall reign number
Reign	Reign number for the specific team—reign numbers for the individuals are in parentheses, if different
Days	Number of days held
Defenses	Number of successful defenses
<1	Reign lasted less than a day
+	Current reign is changing daily

No.	Champion	Championship change			Reign statistics			Notes	Ref.
No.	Champion	Date	Event	Location	Reign	Days	Defenses	Notes	Ref.
1	SPiCEAP (Maika Ozaki and Tae Honma)	February 11, 2021	AWG Act 51	Tokyo, Japan	1	183	1	Defeated Kakeru Sekiguchi and Miku Aono in the finals of an 14-teams tournament to become the inaugural champions.	
2	Kakeru Sekiguchi and Miku Aono	August 13, 2021	AWG Act in Korakuen Hall	Tokyo, Japan	1	139	3		
—	Deactivated	December 30, 2021	—	—	—	—	—	Title was deactivated over Actwres girl'Z closure.	
3	Amaterasu (ACT and Mari)	August 13, 2025	AWG ACTwrestling in Korakuen Hall	Tokyo, Japan	1	243	1	Defeated MRC (Marino Saihara & Rico Fukunaga) in the finals of the ACT GAME Tag Tournament to win the reactivated championships.	
4	HaraHara RED (Marino Saihara and Yukina Uehara)	October 19, 2025	AWG ACTwrestling in Korakuen Hall	Tokyo, Japan	1	379+	2	Lineal champion ACT went on hiatus due to injury. Defeated Sakura Mizushima & Rico Fukunaga to win the interim championships. Once Amaterasu's 6-month reign expired due to inactivity, they were recognized as the official champions on April 13, 2026.	

== Combined reigns ==
As of November 2, 2026.

†	Indicates the current champion

=== By team ===
Rank	Team	No. of reigns	Combined defenses	Combined days
1	Amaterasu (ACT and Mari)	1	1	243
2	SPiCEAP (Maika Ozaki and Tae Honma)	1	1	183
3	HaraHara RED (Marino Saihara & Yukina Uehara) †	1	2	379+
4	Kakeru Sekiguchi and Miku Aono	1	3	139

=== By wrestler ===
Rank	Wrestler	No. of reigns	Combined defenses	Combined days
1	ACT	1	1	243
1	Mari	1	1	243
2	Maika Ozaki	1	1	183
2	Tae Honma	1	1	183
3	Marino Saihara †	1	2	379+
3	Yukina Uehara †	1	2	379+
4	Kakeru Sekiguchi	1	3	139
4	Miku Aono	1	3	139

=== Defunct ===
Championship	Fin champion(s)	Date won	Location	Notes
CMLL-Reina International Junior Championship	Kaho Kobayashi	September 15, 2017	Tokyo, Japan	Defeated La Jarochita at Gran Fiesta 2017 Numero 3 to win the vacant title.
Color’s Championship	Saki	December 31, 2021	Tokyo, Japan	Defeated Mii at AWG Color’s to win the title.

=== Annual Events ===
Tournament	Latest winner	Previous winner	Date won	Notes
Pumpkin Rumble	Asako Mia	Nene Arahata	October 31, 2025	Halloween Costume rumble with pinfall, submission, and over the top rope eliminations. The winner receives a tiara and is given the title of "Pumpkin Queen."

== Girl's Pro-Wrestling Unit Color's ==
=== Color's Championship ===
Color's Championship

Details
- Promotion: Actwres girl'Z (January 9, 2021 - December 31, 2021); Girl's Pro-Wrestling Unit Color's (January 1, 2022 - present)
- Date established: January 9, 2021
- Current champion: Saki
- Date won: March 16, 2025
Statistics
- First champion: Mii
- Most reigns: Saki (3 reigns)
- Longest reign: Saki (596+ days)
- Shortest reign: Kakeru Sekiguchi (<1 day)
- Oldest champion: Saki (37 years, 32 days)
- Youngest champion: Mii (age is unknown) (Note: Mii had already graduated High School by the time of her debut in 2018, making her the youngest champion)
- Heaviest champion: Rina Amikura (150 lbs)
- Lightest champion: Mii (99 lbs)

The Color's Championship, formerly known as the AWG Color's Championship, was a midcard women's professional wrestling championship initially created and promoted by the Japanese promotion Actwres girl'Z. After the dissolution of the Color's brand in AWG, the championship began being sanctioned by the newly created Color's promotion which started its activity in early 2022. The title has never been considered deactivated. There have been a total of eleven reigns shared between six different champions and one vacancy. The current holder is Saki who is in her third reign.

Key
No.	Overall reign number
Reign	Reign number for the specific champion
Days	Number of days held
Defenses	Number of successful defenses
<1	Reign lasted less than a day
+	Current reign is changing daily

No.	Champion	Championship change			Reign statistics			Notes	Ref.
No.	Champion	Date	Event	Location	Reign	Days	Defenses	Notes	Ref.
Actwres girl'Z
1	Mii	January 9, 2021	AWG Color's	Yokohama, Japan	1	67	1	This was a two-count rules ten-woman elimination tag team match in which Mii teamed up with Ayano Irie, Mari, Misa Matsui and Waka Tsukiyama to defeat Saki, Rina Amikura, Hikari Shimizu, Ayumi Hayashi and Yuko Sakurai, scoring the final pin to become the inaugural champion.	
2	Saki	March 17, 2021	AWG Color's	Tokyo, Japan	1	424	6		
Girl's Pro-Wrestling Unit Color's
3	Kakeru Sekiguchi	May 15, 2022	COLOR'S FESTIVAL!!	Tokyo, Japan	1	<1	0		
4	Saki	May 15, 2022	COLOR'S FESTIVAL!!	Tokyo, Japan	2	287	2		
5	Rina Amikura	February 26, 2023	COLOR'S Yes, My Way Vol. 5	Tokyo, Japan	1	69	0	This was a four-way match also involving Hikari Shimizu and Yuko Sakurai.	
—	Vacated	May 6, 2023	—	—	—	—	—		
Color's/Pure-J/Wave
6	Momo Tani	May 6, 2023	COLOR'S Yes, My Way Vol. 6	Tokyo, Japan	1	85	1	Tani won a battle royal also involving Hikari Shimizu, Kakeru Sekiguchi, Kaori Yoneyama, Riko Kawahata, Saki, Tae Honma and Yuko Sakurai to win the vacant title.	
7	Rina Amikura	July 30, 2023	PURE-J GO! GO! Rainbow Mountain Vol. 7	Tokyo, Japan	2	562	3		
8	Hikari Shimizu	February 11, 2025	WAVE Itabashi Surprise	Tokyo, Japan	1	15	0		
9	Kakeru Sekiguchi	February 26, 2025	Gokigen Pro Wrestling Kaori Yoneyama's Birthday	Kanagawa, Japan	2	<1	0		
10	Hikari Shimizu	February 26, 2025	Gokigen Pro Wrestling Kaori Yoneyama's Birthday	Kanagawa, Japan	2	18	0	This was three-way match including Matsuzawa-san	
Girl's Pro-Wrestling Unit Color's
11	Saki	March 16, 2025	COLOR'S Yes, My Way Vol. 14 ~ Heechan Retires	Tokyo, Japan	3	596+	11		

=== Combined reigns ===
As of November 2, 2026

†	Indicates the current champion

Rank	Wrestler	No. of reigns	Combined defenses	Combined days
1	Saki †	3	19	1,307+
2	Rina Amikura	2	4	632
3	Momo Tani	1	1	85
4	Mii	1	1	67
5	Hikari Shimizu	2	0	33
6	Kakeru Sekiguchi	2	0	<1
