= List of Dream Star Fighting Marigold personnel =

Dream Star Fighting Marigold is a Japanese professional wrestling promotion founded in 2024. Stardom personnel consists of professional wrestlers, commentators, ring announcers, and various other positions. Executive officers are also listed alongside partnerships with Pro Wrestling Noah and WWE.

== Personnel ==
There is one central unit in Marigold:

- Darkness Revolution

=== Wrestlers ===
Ring name	Real name	Notes
Chiaki	Chiaki Kanahama	Marigold 3D Trios Champion
Chika Goto	Chika Goto	Marigold Twin Star Champion
Erina Yamanaka	Unknown	
Hummingbird	Yasuka Nakayama	
Kizuna Tanaka	Kizuna Tanaka	
Kouki Amarei	Unknown	Marigold Twin Star Champion
Komomo Minami	Komomo Minami	
Mai Sakurai	Mai Sakurai	
Mayu Iwatani	Mayu Iwatani	Marigold Super Fly Champion
Megaton	Moyoko Todoroki	
Miku Aono	Miku Aono	Marigold World Champion
Minami Yuuki	Unknown	
Misa Matsui	Misa Matsui	Marigold 3D Trios Champion
Nagisa Nozaki	Nagisa Nozaki	Freelancer
Nagisa Tachibana	Unknown	
Natsumi Showzuki	Natsumi Tokoda	
Nao Ishikawa	Unknown	
Rea Seto	Unknown	Marigold 3D Trios Champion
Seri Yamaoka	Seri Yamada	
Shinno	Shinno Omukai	
Shoko Koshino	Shoko Koshino	a.k.a. Flying Penguin
Victoria Yuzuki	Yuzuki Kokawa	Marigold United National Champion
Yuuka Yamazaki	Unknown	

=== Staff ===
Ring name	Real name	Notes
Rossy Ogawa	Hiroshi Ogawa	Founder; Owner
Fuka	Fuka Kakimoto	Assistant Producer
Hachiro Suzuki	Hachiro Suzuki	Director
Hikaru Ohira	Hikaru Ohira	Ring Announcer
Sonny Gutierrez	Sonny Gutierrez	Video production manager
Takahiro Masumura	Takahiro Masumura	Event manager

== Former alumni ==
Ring name	Real name	Notes
Giulia	Eimi Matsudo	Left on August 25, 2024, to join WWE.
Bozilla	Unknown	Freelancer Left on 2025, to join Stardom
Ryoko Sakimura	Unknown	Left on July 31, 2025, to join Naniwa Joshi Pro-Wrestling
Naho Yamada	Naho Yamada	Left on September 20, 2025, to become a freelancer
Mirai	Mirai Ito	Left on October 13, 2025, to join Michinoku Pro Wrestling

=== Notable guests ===
- Iyo Sky
- Myla Grace
- Shinobu Kandori
- Takako Inoue
- Zayda Steel
- Sareee

== See also ==
- List of professional wrestling rosters
