= Miyuki Takase =

Japanese professional wrestler

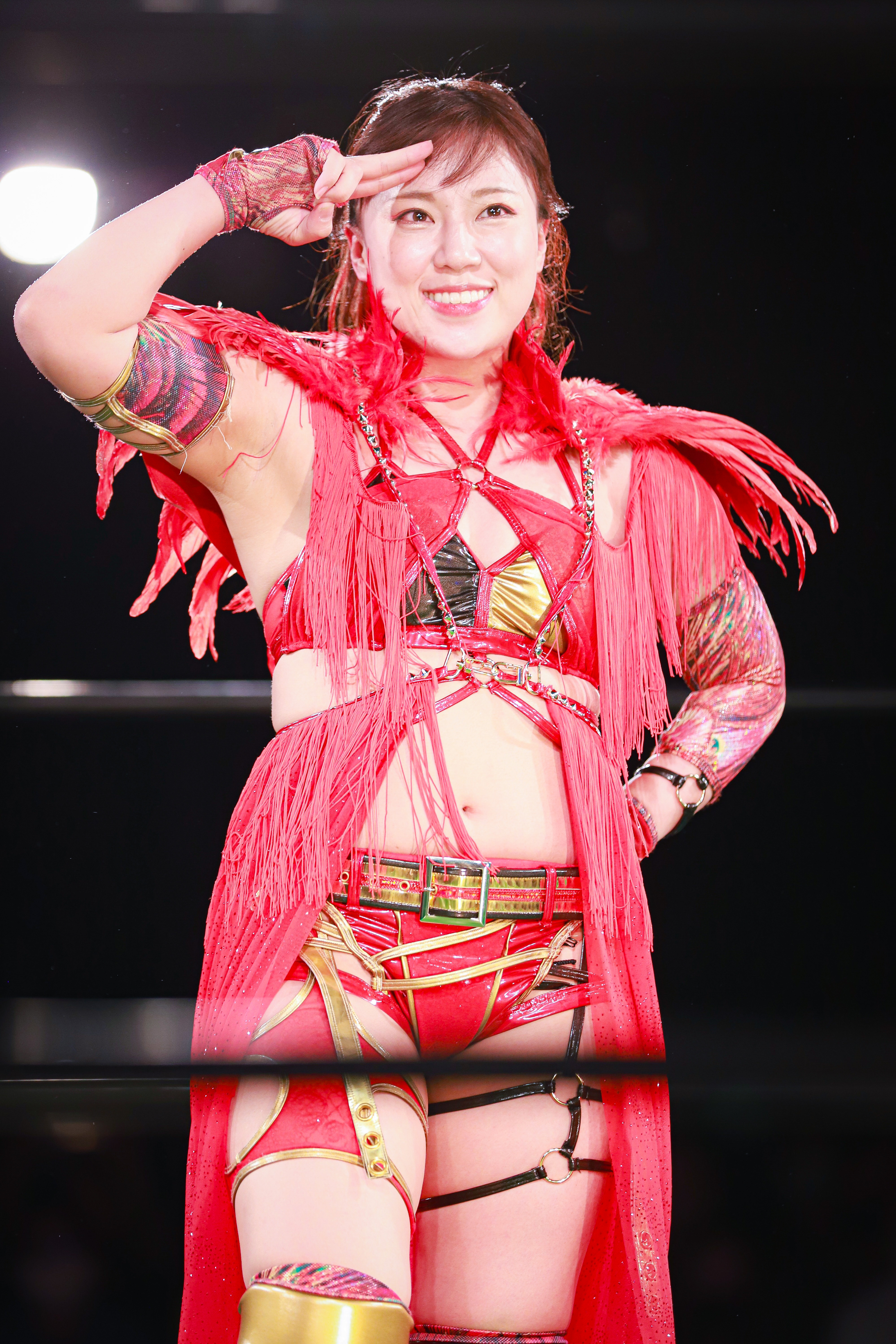
- Takase in April 2023

Personal information
- Born: September 8, 1994 Osaka, Japan

Professional wrestling career
- Ring name(s): HOPE; Miyuki Takase; Queen of Hearts
- Billed height: 158 cm (5 ft 2 in)
- Trained by: Misaki Ohata; Ryo Mizunami
- Debut: 2017

Miyuki Takase (高瀬みゆき, Takase Miyuki) is a Japanese professional wrestler. She is signed to Sendai Girls' Pro Wrestling, and is best known for her tenure with the Japanese promotions Actwres girl'Z, Pro Wrestling Wave and Pure-J.

== Professional wrestling career ==
=== Independent circuit (2017–present) ===
Takase made her professional wrestling debut at AgZ Act 14 ~ New Year Revival, an event promoted by Actwres girl'Z on January 15, 2017, where she fell short to Cherry. On November 6, 2019, she defeated Himeka Arita at Korakuen Hall to claim the vacant AWG Single Championship. Takase held the championship for a record 515 days before losing to Saki on 4 April 2021. On October 29, 2024, Takase made an appearance in the crowd for the Actwres girl'Z Step 50 Halloween event, where she was challenged by Kyoka Iwai to a match, however, Takase seemingly declined as she had not seen enough from Iwai to interest her. On November 10, 2024, Actwres girl'Z announced on social media that Miyuki Takase would face Kyoka Iwai on the 14th of that month for Step 51 at Shinkiba 1st Ring, in what would be her first performance in AWG for almost 3 years.

At JWP Fly High In The 25th Anniversary, an event promoted by JWP Joshi Puroresu on March 20, 2017, she fell short to Yako Fujigasaki. At Ice Ribbon New Ice Ribbon #1007 on November 17, 2019, she teamed up with maya Yukihi and defeated Akane Fujita and Himeka. At OZ Have A Great Year!, an event promoted by Oz Academy on December 13, 2020, she teamed up with Ami Miura in a losing effort against Mission K4 (Kaho Kobayashi and Kakeru Sekiguchi). At Seadlinnng 2021 Opening Match on January 11, Takase teamed up with Nanae Takahashi to defeat "Max Voltage" stablemates Itsuki Aoki and Ryo Mizunami in an intern-stable feud. At Hana Kimura Memorial Show, an event produced by Kyoko Kimura on May 23, 2021, to commemorate one year since the passing of her daughter Hana Kimura, Takase competed in a 28-person All-Star Battle Royal also involving notable opponents such as Hagane Shinnou, Yuko Miyamoto, Yuko Miyamoto, Fuminori Abe, Jun Kasai, Jinsei Shinzaki, Cima, Masato Tanaka and many others.

==== All Japan Pro Wrestling (2017) ====
Takase worked for a brief period of time in All Japan Pro Wrestling as female talent. She marked her first appearance at AJPW GROWIN' UP Vol.3 on June 7, 2017, where she teamed up with Saori Anou to defeat Hikari Shimizu and Natsumi Maki. At AJPW GROWIN' UP Vol.5 on August 3, 2017, she teamed up with Saki in a losing effort against Sumire Natsu and Saori Anou.

==== Pro Wrestling Wave (2017–present) ====
Takase is known for competing in the promotion's signature events such as the Catch the Wave tournament, making her first appearance at the 2017 edition where she placed herself in the Block A, scoring a total of one point after competing against Rina Yamashita, Nagisa Nozaki, Ryo Mizunami, Yumi Ohka and Asuka. At the 2021 edition she fought in the "Power Block" against Ryo Mizunami, Yuu and Yuki Miyazaki and scored two points. She scored her best result at the 2020 edition which she won after fighting in the "Potential Block" where she scored a total of two points after competing against Mio Momono, Sakura Hirota and Tomoka Inaba. She then defeated Kaori Yoneyama in the semi-finals and Rin Kadokura in the finals from July 1.

==== Pure-J (2017–present) ====
Takase is also known for working in Pure-J. At PURE-J Pure Slam Vol. 4 on September 29, 2019, she teamed up with Leon to unsuccessfully challenge Makoto and Moeka Haruhi for the Daily Sports Women's Tag Team Championship.

== Championships and accomplishments ==
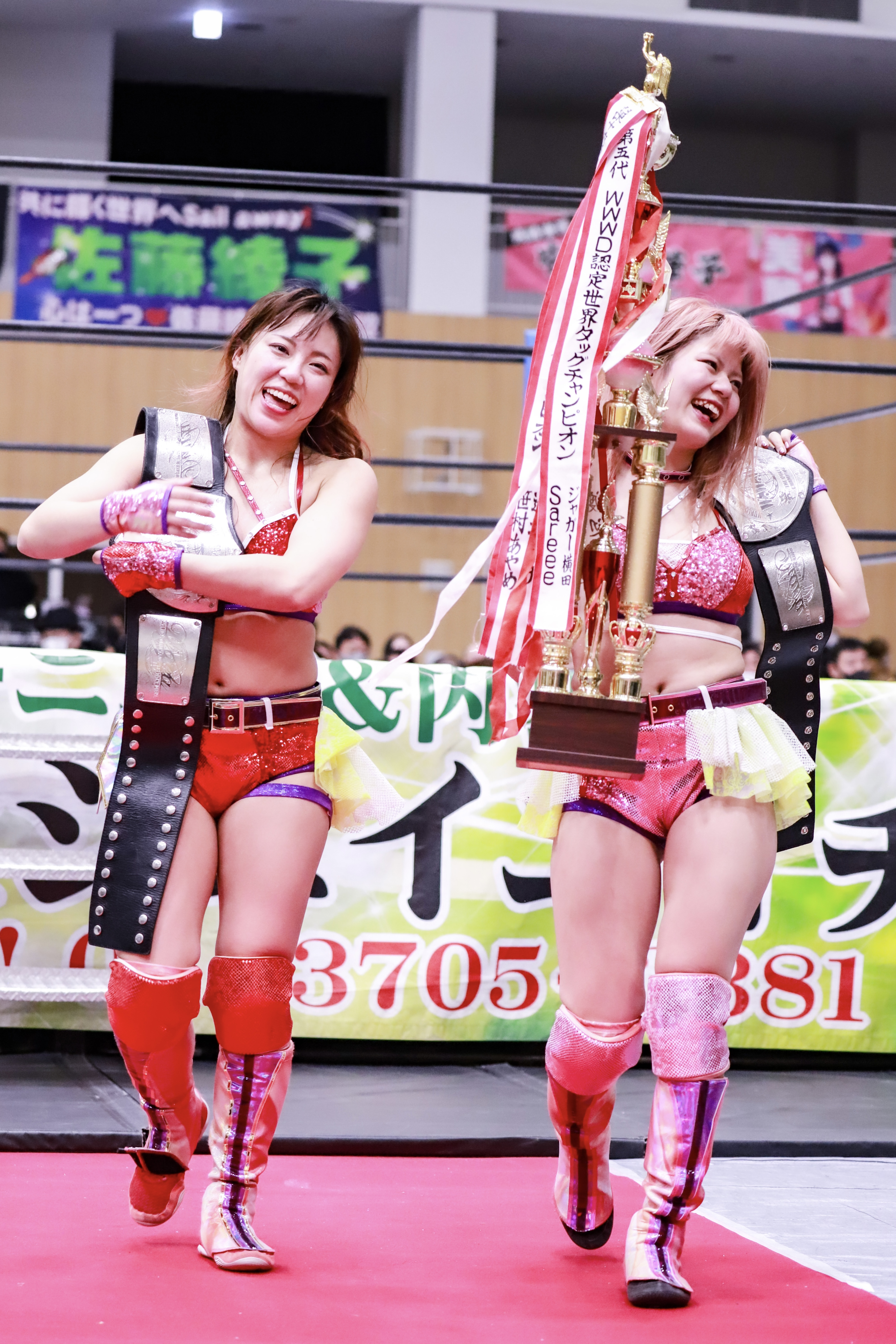
Takase is a former three-time World Woman Pro-Wrestling Diana Tag Team Champion

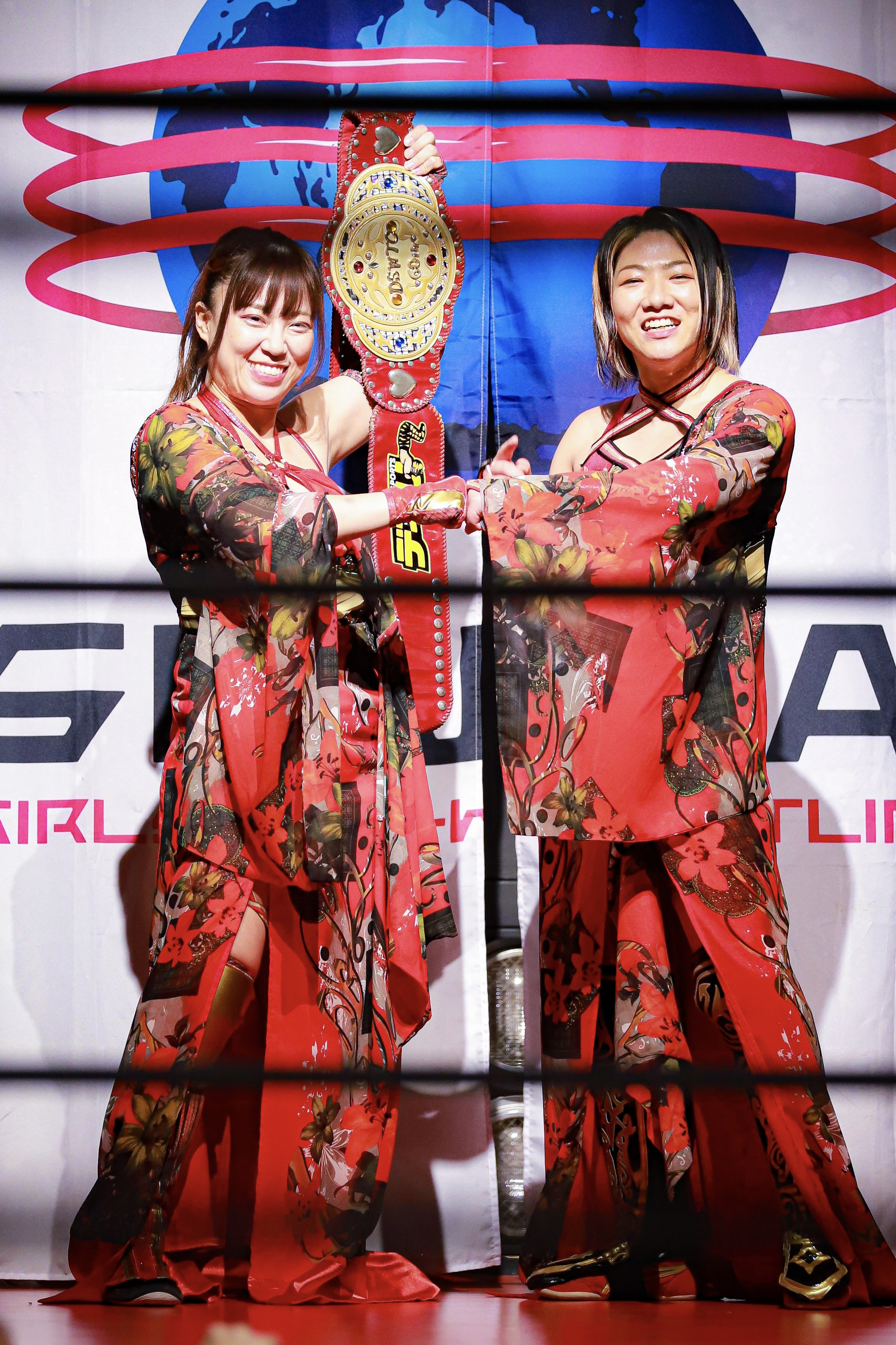
... and a one-time Daily Sports Women's Tag Team Champion

- Actwres girl'Z
  - AWG Single Championship (1 time)
  - AWG Single Championship Tournament (2019)
- Deadlock Pro-Wrestling
  - DPW Women's Worlds Championship (1 time)
- Pro Wrestling Illustrated
  - Ranked No. 120 of the top 250 female wrestlers in the PWI Women's 250 in 2025
- Pro Wrestling Wave
  - Wave Tag Team Championship (1 time) – with Haruka Umesaki
  - Catch the Wave (2021)
  - Catch the Wave Award (1 time)
    - Fighting Spirit Award (2018)
- Pure-J
  - Daily Sports Women's Tag Team Championship (2 times) – with Leon
- Seadlinnng
  - Beyond the Sea Tag Team Championship (1 time) – with Himeka Arita
- Sendai Girls' Pro Wrestling
  - Sendai Girls Tag Team Championship (1 time) – with Mika Iwata
- World Woman Pro-Wrestling Diana
  - World Woman Pro-Wrestling Diana Tag Team Championship (3 times) – with Haruka Umesaki
