= Nagisa Tachibana =

Japanese professional wrestler (born 2000)

Personal information
- Born: July 8, 2000 (age 26)

Professional wrestling career
- Ring name(s): Nagisa Tachibana; Nagisa
- Billed height: 161 cm (5 ft 3 in)
- Billed weight: 50 kg (110 lb)
- Debut: December 26, 2024

Nagisa Tachibana (橘 渚, Tachibana Nagisa, born July 8, 2000) is a Japanese professional wrestler signed to Dream Star Fighting Marigold and Sukeban.

== Professional wrestling career ==
=== Dream Star Fighting Marigold (2024–present) ===
Tachibana began training with Dream Star Fighting Marigold in April 2024. On November 9, 2024, she passed Marigold's pro test.

She made her professional wrestling debut on December 26, 2024, losing to Kizuna Tanaka at Korakuen Hall. On August 22, 2025, she scored her first singles victory, defeating Nao Ishikawa at Sunpearl Arakawa.

=== Sukeban (2026-present) ===
On March 31, 2026, Sukeban announced that Sareee Bomb replaced by "Nagisa" is a new Cherry Bomb Girl and her appearance in World Championship Fight in May 2026.
