= Saori Anou =

Japanese professional wrestler (born 1991)

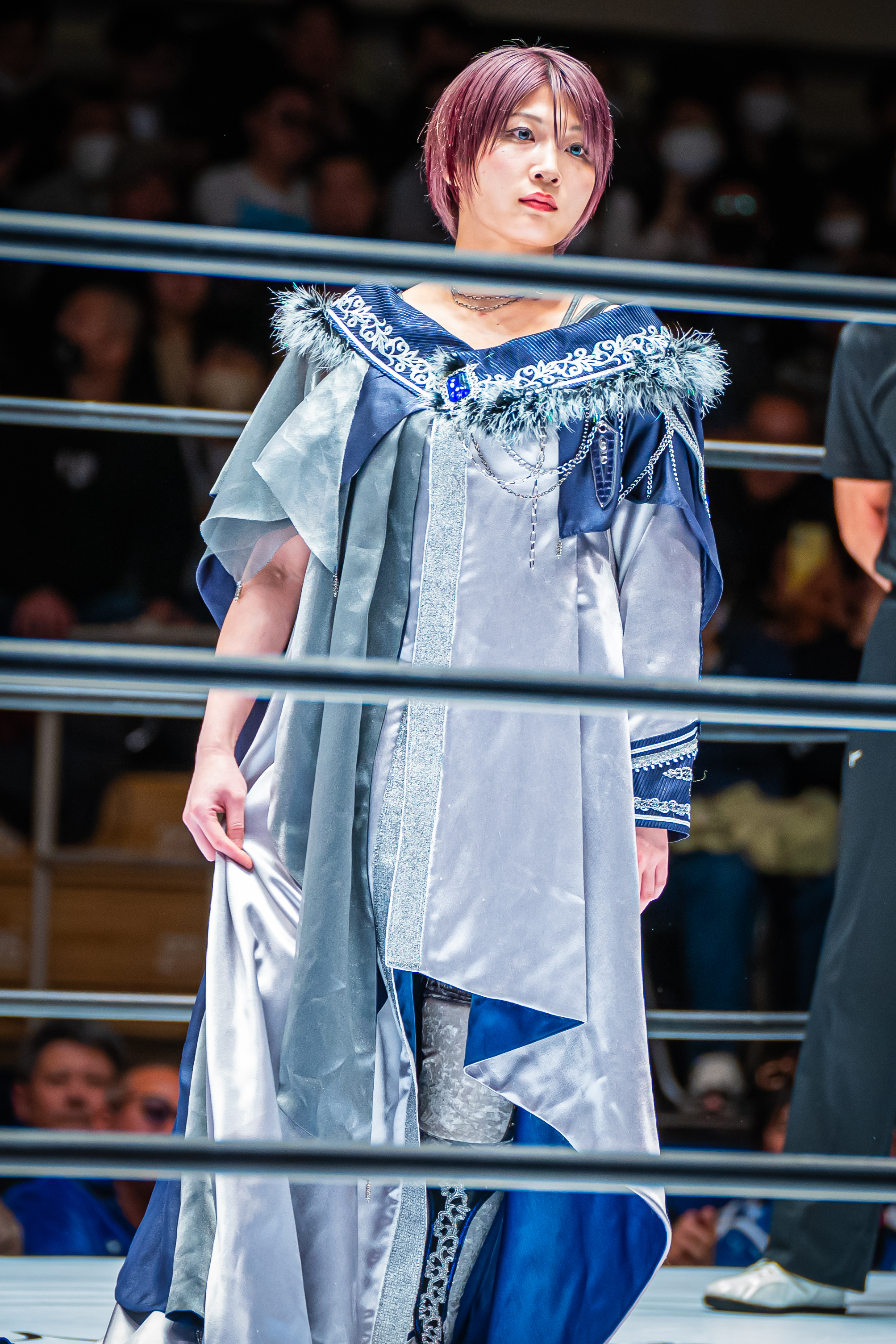
- Anou in January 2025

Personal information
- Born: February 1, 1991 (age 35) Ōtsu, Shiga, Japan

Professional wrestling career
- Ring name(s): Black Poteko; Countess Saori; Saori Anou
- Billed height: 160 cm (5 ft 3 in)
- Billed weight: 56 kg (123 lb)
- Trained by: Yuna Manase
- Debut: 2015

Saori Anou (安納サオリ, Anō Saori; born February 1, 1991) is a Japanese professional wrestler signed to World Wonder Ring Stardom, where she is a member of Cosmic Angels and a former two-time Wonder of Stardom Champion.

Anou is best known for her tenure with the Japanese promotion Actwres girl'Z and her freelance appearances in promotions such as Oz Academy and Ice Ribbon. She is the former ICE Cross Infinity Champion in Ice Ribbon, the inaugural AWG Single Champion in Actwres girl'Z, and former two-time Wonder of Stardom Champion in World Wonder Ring Stardom.

== Professional wrestling career ==
=== Actwres girl'Z (2015–2019) ===
Saori Anou debuted as a professional wrestler at the inaugural Actwres girl'Z show, AgZ Prologue on May 31, 2015. Until her departure from the company in December 2019, Anou was one of AgZ's biggest and most important stars for the promotion. On November 15, 2018, Anou defeated Saki in the finals of the AgZ Title Tournament and became the promotion's first champion. Anou would go on to lose the title to Reika Saiki on August 19, 2019. Anou would make two appearances in AgZ in 2021, including Act Yasukawa's return match.

=== Independent circuit (2015–present) ===
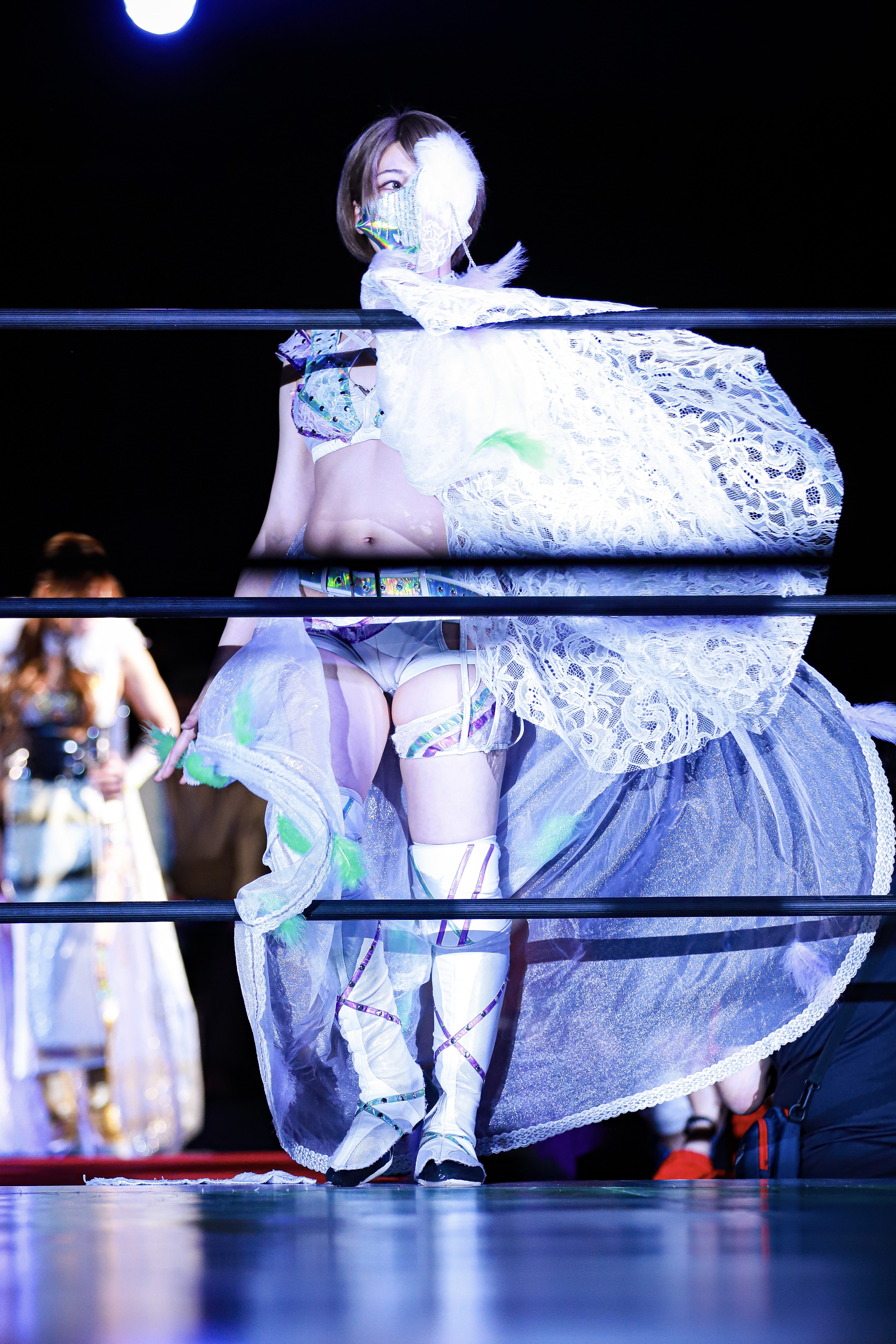
Anou at a Nomad's event in April 2023

As a freelancer, Anou is known for competing in various promotions. At a house show hosted by Pure-J on October 9, 2017, she teamed up with Natsumi Maki and unsuccessfully challenged Command Bolshoi and Leon for the Daily Sports Tag Team Championship. At W-1 WRESTLE-1 Tour 2018 Autumn Bout, an event promoted by Wrestle-1 on November 1, 2018, Anou teamed up with Natsumi Maki in a losing effort to Hana Kimura and Asuka. At Seadlinnng Shin-Kiba 11th NIGHT' on April 12, 2019, Anou teamed up with Miyuki Takase and Himeka Arita in a losing effort to Hiroyo Matsumoto, Makoto and Yoshiko. At Zero1 Super Fireworks, an event promoted by Pro Wrestling Zero1 on February 24, 2020, she teamed up with Mayumi Ozaki against Aja Kong and Hiroyo Matsumoto who was the Blast Queen Champion in a Super Plasma Blast Deathmatch which was also for the title but failed to capture it.

=== World Wonder Ring Stardom ===
==== (2015–2017) ====
Anou stepped into World Wonder Ring Stardom for a brief period of time. She is known for competing in various events such as the Goddesses of Stardom Tag League, making her first appearance at the 2016 edition where she teamed up with Hiromi Mimura, placing themselves in the Block A and scoring one point after facing the teams of Twisted Sisters (Holidead and Thunder Rosa), Chelsea Green and Santana Garrett, and Kairi Hojo and Yoko Bito. At Stardom Year-End Climax 2016 on December 22, she teamed up with Kaori Yoneyama in a losing effort to Natsuko Tora and Jungle Kyona and Oedo Tai (Hana Kimura and Kris Wolf) as a result of a three-way tag team match.

==== Cosmic Angels (2023–present) ====
Anou returned to Stardom in April 2023, agreeing to tag with Kairi and Natsupoi to take on Prominence at Stardom All Star Grand Queendom for the Artist of Stardom Championship. At the Stardom Cinderella Tournament 2023 before that, Anou joined Cosmic Angels after Mina Shirakawa and Waka Tsukiyama left the group. On April 23, 2023, at All Star Grand Queendom, Anou alongside Kairi and Natsupoi defeated Prominence (Hiragi Kurumi, Risa Sera and Suzu Suzuki) to win the Artist of Stardom Championship. On May 27, at Flashing Champions, REStart lost their title to the Baribari Bombers (Giulia, Mai Sakurai and Thekla), ending their reign at 34 days. At Stardom x Stardom: Osaka Summer Team on August 13, Anou and Natsupoi won the Goddesses of Stardom Championship by defeating Rose Gold. At Dream Queendom 2023, Anou won the Wonder of Stardom Championship by defeating Mirai.

=== DDT Pro Wrestling (2017–2018, 2020–present) ===
Anou has made sporadic appearances for DDT Pro Wrestling during the years. Her first match took place at DDT YAROZ Part 4 on February 14, 2017, where she defeated Tam Nakano. At DDT Live! Maji Manji #11 on July 10, 2018, she competed in an 7-person survival battle royal for the Ironman Heavymetalweight Championship also involving Konosuke Takeshita, Kudo, Toru Owashi, Masahiro Takanashi, Nobuhiro Shimatani and Saki Akai.

She also competed in signature events of the promotion such as DDT Peter Pan. On the first night of Wrestle Peter Pan 2020 on June 6, she teamed up with Hiroshi Yamato to defeat Haruka Kato and Keisuke Ishii.

=== Ice Ribbon (2017–present) ===
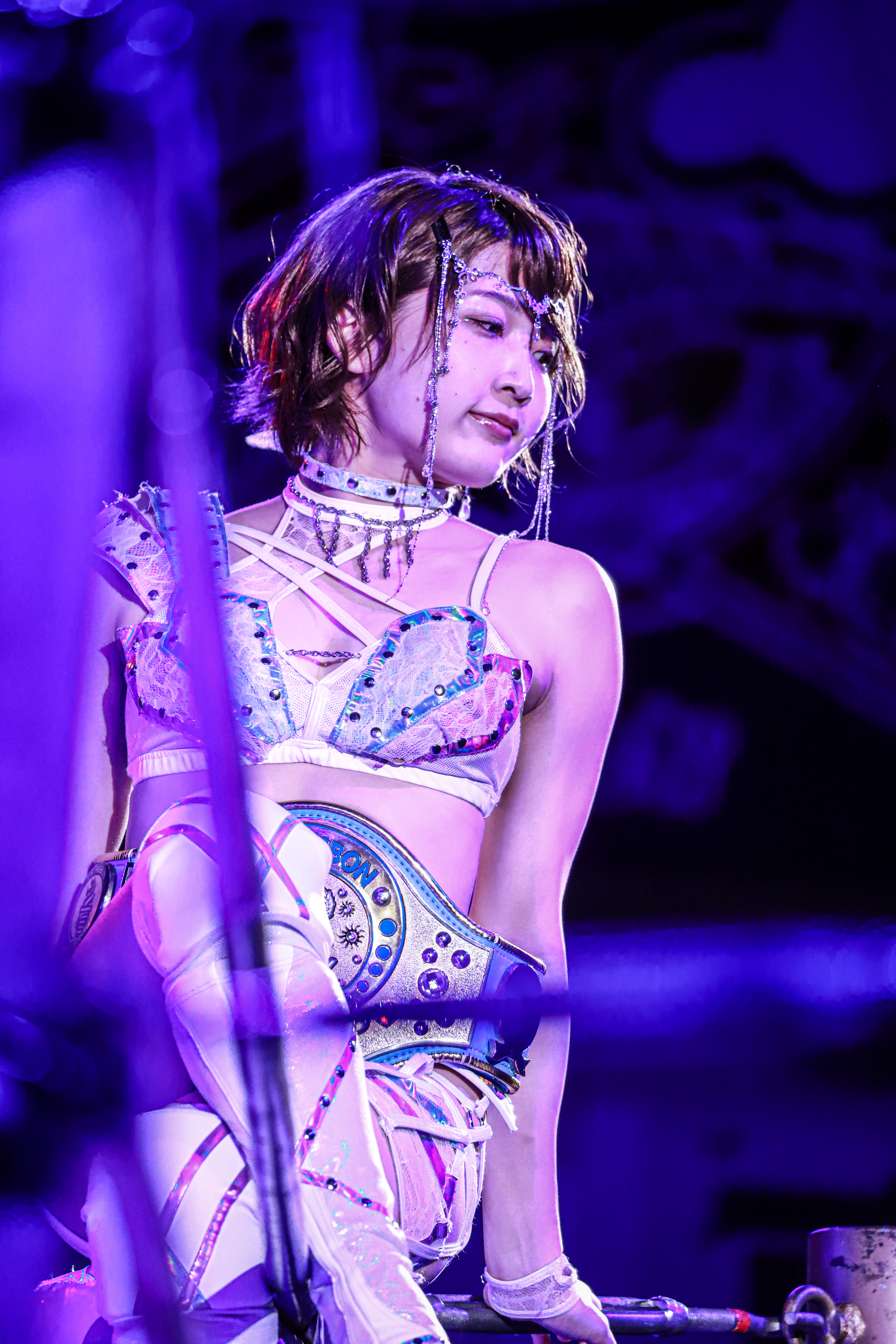
Anou as the ICE Cross Infinity Champion.

Anou also made appearances for Ice Ribbon. At New Ice Ribbon #974 on August 3, 2019, she teamed up with Maika Ozaki and unsuccessfully challenged Giulia and Tequila Saya for the International Ribbon Tag Team Championship. At New Ice Ribbon #1090 on December 31, 2020, Anou unsuccessfully challenged Suzu Suzuki for the ICE Cross Infinity Championship. On June 26, 2022, Anou defeated Yuki Mashiro to win the vacant ICE Cross Infinity Championship. At New Ice Ribbon #1267 on March 19, 2023, Anou dropped the title to Satsuki Totoro, ending her reign at 266 days.

=== Oz Academy (2017–present) ===
Anou is known for competing in Oz Academy. She made her first appearance in the promotion at OZ Academy Plum Hanasaku 2017 on August 20 where she teamed up with Command Bolshoi and Aoi Kizuki in a losing effort to Kaori Yoneyama, Rina Yamashita and Sakura Hirota as a result of a six-woman tag team match. When competing in the promotion, she is part of the Ozaki-gun stable. At OZ Academy You Might Think on October 7, 2018, she teamed up with stablemates Mayumi Ozaki and Yumi Ohka in a losing effort to Borderless (Rina Yamashita and Yoshiko) and Hikaru Shida. At Something is Happening Tonight on August 25, 2019, Anou teamed up with Maya Yukihi and defeated Beast Friend (Hiroyo Matsumoto and Kaori Yoneyama) to win the Oz Academy Tag Team Championship. At OZ Academy Plum Hanasaku 2020 ~ OZ No Kuni Buntai Final on August 28, 2020, she unsuccessfully challenged Mayumi Ozaki for the Oz Academy Openweight Championship.

== Championships and accomplishments ==
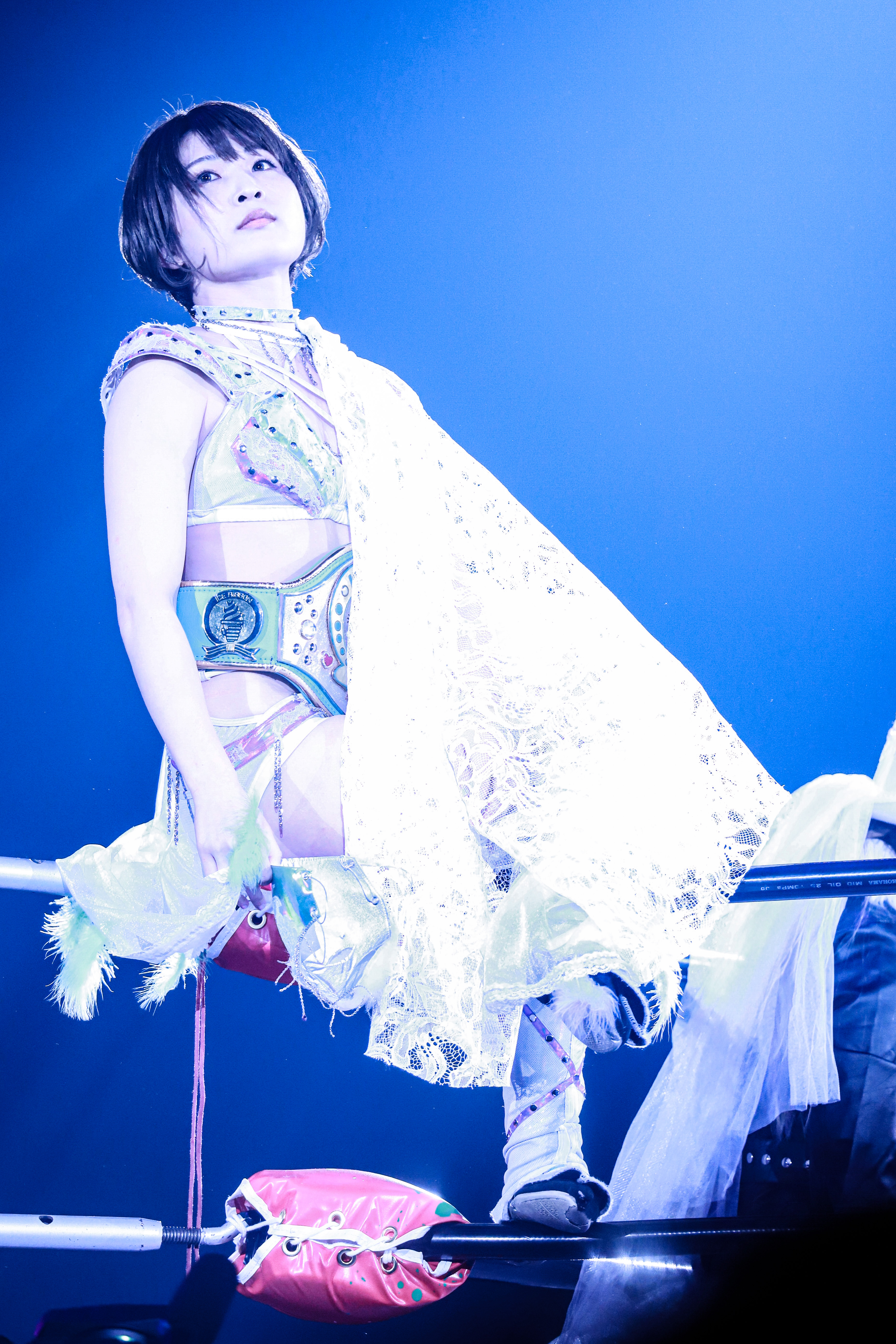
Anou is a former one-time ICE Cross Infinity Champion

- Actwres girl'Z
  - AgZ Championship / AWG Single Championship (1 time (inaugural)) (Note: Anou's first reign was when the championship was called the AgZ Championship. During her reign, the title was re-named to the AWG Single Championship.)
  - AgZ Championship Tournament (2018)
- Ice Ribbon
  - ICE Cross Infinity Championship (1 time)
- DDT Pro-Wrestling
  - Ironman Heavymetalweight Championship (1 time)
- Oz Academy
  - Oz Academy Openweight Championship (1 time)
  - Oz Academy Tag Team Championship (2 time, current) – with Maya Yukihi (1) and Unagi Sayaka (1)
  - Best Wizard Award (4 times)
    - Best Bout Award (2020) vs. Mayumi Ozaki on August 28
    - Best Bout Award (2021) vs. Maya Yukihi, Mayumi Ozaki and Yumi Ohka on August 18
    - Best Bout Award (2023) with Kakeru and Mayumi Ozaki vs. Chigusa Nagayo, Mio Momono and Tomoko Watanabe on October 22
    - Impact Grand Award (2018) Anou joining Ozaki-gun
- Pro Wrestling Illustrated
  - Ranked No. 27 of the top 250 female wrestlers in the PWI Women's 250 in 2024
- Pure-J
  - Princess of Pro-Wrestling Championship (1 time)
- Sendai Girls' Pro Wrestling
  - Sendai Girls World Championship (1 time)
- World Wonder Ring Stardom
  - Wonder of Stardom Championship (2 times)
  - Artist of Stardom Championship (2 times) – with Kairi and Natsupoi (1) and Tam Nakano and Natsupoi (1)
  - Goddesses of Stardom Championship (1 time) – with Natsupoi
  - Stardom Year-End Award (3 times)
    - Best Tag Team Award (2023) – with Natsupoi
    - Best Unit Award (2024) as part of Cosmic Angels
    - Outstanding Performance Award (2024)
  - 5★Star GP Awards
    - Blue Stars Best Match Award (2024) vs. Starlight Kid on August 15 in Blue Stars A
    - Blue Stars Best Match Award (2025) vs. Bozilla on August 6 in Blue Stars A
