= Marigold Summer Gold Shine 2024 =

2024 Dream Star Fighting Marigold event

- Promotional poster for the event featuring Giulia
- Promotion: Dream Star Fighting Marigold
- Date: August 19, 2024
- City: Tokyo, Japan
- Venue: Korakuen Hall
- Attendance: 1,450
- Tagline(s): Giulia last match Arrivederci

Pay-per-view chronology
← Previous; Summer Destiny	Next → Dream Star Grand Prix 2024

Marigold Summer Gold Shine 2024 was a professional wrestling event promoted by Dream Star Fighting Marigold. It took place on August 19, 2024, in Tokyo, Japan at the Korakuen Hall. The event aired globally on CyberFight's video-on-demand service Wrestle Universe.

The event featured what was billed as Giulia's last match in Japan before her imminent debut in WWE's NXT brand. However, without any official confirmations, it is still widely believed that Giulia might still work in Japan in the future, giving the inter-promotional partnership with WWE that saw Iyo Sky return to Japan at Marigold Summer Destiny on July 13, 2024.

== Production ==
=== Background ===
The show featured professional wrestling matches that result from scripted storylines, where wrestlers portrayed villains, heroes, or less distinguishable characters in the scripted events that built tension and culminated in a wrestling match or series of matches.

=== Event ===
The event started with the singles confrontation between Komomo Minami and Minami Yuuki, solded with the victory of the latter. Next up, Misa Matsui picked up a victory over Nao Ishikawa and Marigold Super Fly Champion Natsumi Showzuki in three-way competition. In the third bout of the event, Bozilla, Chiaki, Myla Grace and Zayda Steel wrestled into a time-limit draw against the team of Kizuna Tanaka, Mirai, Utami Hayashishita and Victoria Yuzuki. The fourth bout saw Arisa Nakajima and Marigold World Champion Sareee defeating Chika Goto and Nanae Takahashi in tag team action. In the semi main event, Miku Aono defeated Kouki Amarei to secure the first defense of the Marigold United National Championship in that respective reign. Aono became the first wrestler to defend a title since the debut of Marigold.

In the main event, Giulia defeated long time tag team partner and one half of the Marigold Twin Star Champions Mai Sakurai in singles competition to mark her last match in Japan before heading to WWE.

== Results ==
No.	Results	Stipulations	Times
1	Minami Yuuki defeated Komomo Minami by pinfall	Singles match	9:02
2	Misa Matsui defeated Nao Ishikawa and Natsumi Showzuki by pinfall	Three-way match	8:07
3	Bozilla, Chiaki, Myla Grace and Zayda Steel vs. Kizuna Tanaka, Mirai, Utami Hayashishita and Victoria Yuzuki ended in a time-limit draw	Eight-woman tag team elimination match	20:00
4	Sareee and Arisa Nakajima defeated Chika Goto and Nanae Takahashi by submission	Tag team match	15:43
5	Miku Aono (c) defeated Kouki Amarei by pinfall	Singles match for the Marigold United National Championship	21:00
6	Giulia defeated Mai Sakurai by pinfall	Singles match	26:46
(c) / – the champion(s) heading into the match
