= Marigold Fantastic Adventure 2024 =

2024 Dream Star Fighting Marigold event

Marigold Fantastic Adventure 2024 (Night 2)
- Promotional poster for the event featuring Mai Sakurai and Mirai Maiumi
- Promotion: Dream Star Fighting Marigold
- Date: October 7 and 24, 2024
- City: Tokyo, Japan
- Venue: Korakuen Hall
- Attendance: Night 1 (623); Night 2 (866)

Pay-per-view chronology
← Previous; Dream Star Grand Prix 2024	Next → Winter Wonderful Fight 2024

Marigold Fantastic Adventure 2024 was a multiple-night professional wrestling event promoted by Dream Star Fighting Marigold. The pay-per-view events of the tour took place on October 7 and 24, 2024, in Tokyo, Japan at the Korakuen Hall. The event aired globally on CyberFight's video-on-demand service Wrestle Universe.

== Production ==
=== Background ===
The show featured professional wrestling matches that result from scripted storylines, where wrestlers portrayed villains, heroes, or less distinguishable characters in the scripted events that built tension and culminated in a wrestling match or series of matches.

== Night 1 ==
=== Event ===
The first pay-per-view night of the tour (Night 2 overall) took place on October 7, 2024. The show started with the tag team confrontation between Minami Yuuki and Myla Grace, and Rea Seto and Komomo Minami, solded with the victory of the latter team. In the second bout, Misa Matsui picked up a victory over Chiaki in singles competition. Next up, Utami Hayashishita and Kizuna Tanaka outmatched Nanae Takahashi and Nao Ishikawa in tag team action. The fourth bout saw Natsumi Showzuki wrestling Victoria Yuzuki into a time-limit draw in a match disputed for Showzuki's Marigold Super Fly Championship out of which she has secured the first defense of the title in that respective reign. After the bout concluded, Showzuki received a title challenge from the masked Hummingbird in a bout which was scheduled for October 24, 2024. In the semi main event, Bozilla and Nagisa Nozaki defeated Marigold World Champion Sareee and Marigold United National Champion Miku Aono in tag team competition. After the bout concluded, Nozaki challenged Aono for the United title and Bozilla laid a challenge for Sareee's title in two bouts scheduled for October 24, 2024.

In the main event, Mirai and Mai Sakurai defeated Kouki Amarei and Chika Goto to secure the second consecutive defense of the Marigold Twin Star Championship. After the bout concluded, they received a challenge from Victoria Yuzuki and Kizuna Tanaka.

=== Results ===
No.	Results	Stipulations	Times
1	Rea Seto and Komomo Minami defeated Minami Yuuki and Myla Grace by submission	Tag team match	10:42
2	Misa Matsui defeated Chiaki by pinfall	Singles match	7:23
3	Utami Hayashishita and Kizuna Tanaka defeated Nanae Takahashi and Nao Ishikawa by pinfall	Tag team match	14:10
4	Natsumi Showzuki (c) vs. Victoria Yuzuki ended in a time-limit draw	Singles match for the Marigold Super Fly Championship	15:00
5	Bozilla and Nagisa Nozaki defeated Sareee and Miku Aono by pinfall	Tag team match	16:02
6	MiraiSaku (Mirai and Mai Sakurai) (c) defeated tWin toWer (Kouki Amarei and Chika Goto)	Tag team match for the Marigold Twin Star Championship	17:38
(c) / – the champion(s) heading into the match

== Night 2 ==
The second pay-per-view night of the tour (Night 7 overall) took place on October 24, 2024. The event started with the tag confrontation between Komomo Minami and Minami Yuuki, and Chiaki and Myla Grace, solded with the latter team's victory. Next up, Misa Matsui defeated Naho Yamada in the latter's debut match. The third bout saw Utami Hayashishita and Kouki Amarei picking up a victory over Chika Goto and Rea Seto in tag team competition. The fourth bout saw Nanae Takahashi defeating Nao Ishikawa in one of Takahashi's signature "Passion injection" match bouts. In the fifth match, Natsumi Showzuki defeated Hummingbird to secure the second consecutive defense of the Marigold Super Fly Championship in that respective reign. After the bout concluded, Misa Matsui stepped up to challenge Showzuki for the title in a match which was set to take place on November 2, 2024. Next up, Mirai and Mai Sakurai defeated Victoria Yuzuki and Kizuna Tanaka to secure the third consecutive defense of the Marigold Twin Star Championship in that respective reign. After the bout concluded, Kouki Amarei and Utami Hayashishita stepped up as the next challengers. In the semi main event, Miku Aono defeated Nagisa Nozaki to secure the second consecutive defense of the Marigold United National Championship in that respective reign.

In the main event, Sareee defeated Bozilla to secure the first successful defense of the Marigold World Championship in that respective reign. After the bout concluded, Nanae Takahashi stepped up as the next challenger.

=== Results ===
No.	Results	Stipulations	Times
1	Chiaki and Myla Grace defeated Komomo Minami and Minami Yuuki	Tag team match	10:24
2	Misa Matsui defeated Naho Yamada	Singles match	11:29
3	Utami Hayashishita and Kouki Amarei defeated Chika Goto and Rea Seto	Tag team match	11:48
4	Nanae Takahashi defeated Nao Ishikawa	"Passion injection" match	11:50
5	Natsumi Showzuki (c) defeated Hummingbird	Singles match for the Marigold Super Fly Championship	9:33
6	MiraiSaku (Mirai and Mai Sakurai) (c) defeated Selene Flora (Victoria Yuzuki and Kizuna Tanaka)	Tag team match for the Marigold Twin Star Championship	15:25
7	Miku Aono (c) defeated Nagisa Nozaki	Singles match for the Marigold United National Championship	10:24
8	Sareee (c) defeated Bozilla	Singles match for the Marigold World Championship	18:47
(c) / – the champion(s) heading into the match
