= Marigold Grand Destiny 2026 =

2026 Dream Star Fighting Marigold event

- Promotional poster for the event featuring Mayu Iwatani, Miku Aono and Victoria Yuzuki
- Promotion: Dream Star Fighting Marigold
- Date: October 24, 2026
- City: Tokyo, Japan
- Venue: Ryōgoku Kokugikan
- Attendance: 2,100

Event chronology
← Previous; Dream Star Grand Prix 2026	Next → —

Grand Destiny chronology
← Previous; 2025	Next → —

Marigold Grand Destiny 2026 was a professional wrestling event promoted by Dream Star Fighting Marigold. It took place on October 24, 2026, in Tokyo, Japan at the Ryōgoku Kokugikan. The event aired globally on CyberFight's video-on-demand service Wrestle Universe.

== Production ==
=== Background ===
The show featured professional wrestling matches that result from scripted storylines, where wrestlers portrayed villains, heroes, or less distinguishable characters in the scripted events that built tension and culminated in a wrestling match or series of matches.

=== Event ===
The event started with the singles confrontation between Suzuka and The Lady AI, solded with the victory of the latter. The second bout saw Shinno picking up a victory over Kizuna Tanaka in singles competition. Next up, Komomo Minami and Nagisa Tachibana wrestled Seri Yamaoka and Yuuka Yamazaki into a time-limit draw. In the fourth match, Megaton drew against Yoshino Chitose in a mixed martial arts-rules match in the second rounds. Next up, Mai Sakurai, Natsumi Showzuki and Erina Yamanaka outmatched Chanyota, Diana Strong and Mila Smidt in six-woman tag team competition. Sakurai left the promotion as it was her last announced bout. The sixth bout saw Misa Matsui, Chiaki and Rea Seto defeat Flying Penguin, Hummingbird and Nanase to secure the first successful defense of the Marigold 3D Trios Championship in that respective reign. In the semi main event, Chika Goto and Kouki Amarei defeated Hikari Noa and Unagi Sayaka to secure the fifth consecutive defense of the Marigold Twin Star Championship in that respective reign.

In the main event, Mayu Iwatani defeated Miku Aono and Victoria Yuzuki in a "triple crown match" disputed for Iwatani's Marigold Super Fly Championship, for Aono's Marigold World Championship and for Yuzuki's Marigold United National Championship. Iwatani secured the eighth consecutive defense of the Super Fly title in that respective reign.

== Results ==
No.	Results	Stipulations	Times
1	The Lady AI defeated Suzuka by pinfall	Singles match	7:08
2	Shinno defeated Kizuna Tanaka by pinfall	Singles match	13:15
3	Komomo Minami and Nagisa Tachibana vs. Seri Yamaoka and Yuuka Yamazaki ended in a time-limit draw	Tag team match	15:00
4	Megaton vs. Yoshino Chitose ended in a time-limit draw (R2)	Mixed martial arts rules match	2:00
5	La Vie en Rose (Mai Sakurai, Natsumi Showzuki and Erina Yamanaka) defeated Chanyota, Diana Strong and Mila Smidt by pinfall	Six-woman tag team match	9:16
6	Darkness Revolution (Misa Matsui, Chiaki and Rea Seto) (c) defeated Flying Penguin, Hummingbird and Nanase by pinfall	Six-woman tag team match for the Marigold 3D Trios Championship	16:56
7	tWin toWer (Chika Goto and Kouki Amarei) (c) defeated Hikari Noa and Unagi Sayaka by pinfall	Tag team match for the Marigold Twin Star Championship	18:33
8	Mayu Iwatani (Super Fly) defeated Miku Aono (World) and Victoria Yuzuki (United) by pinfall	Three-way Winner Takes All match for the Marigold World, United National and Super Fly Championship	26:17
(c) / – the champion(s) heading into the match
