= Myla Grace =

Northern Irish professional wrestler (born 1993)

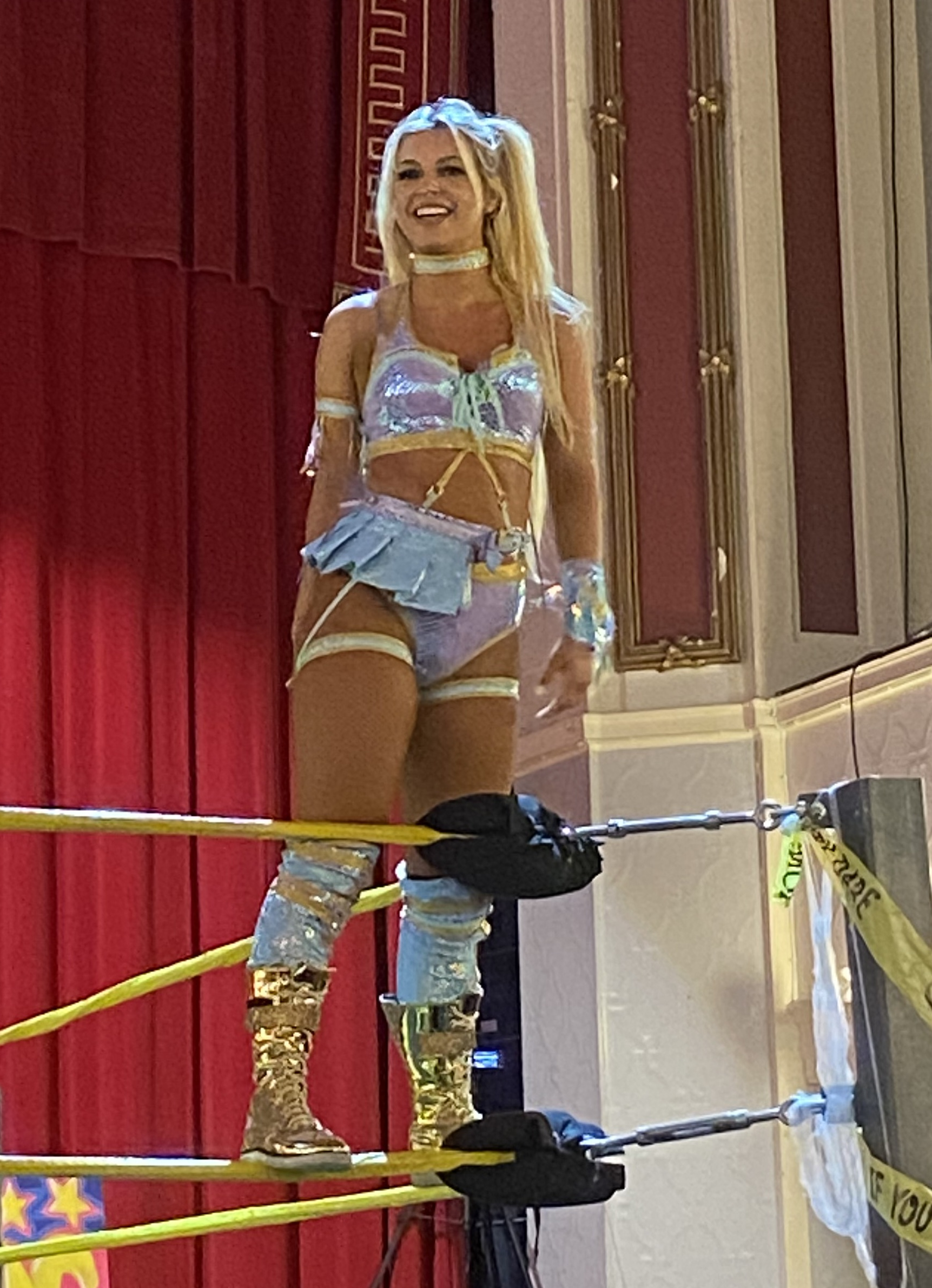
- Grace in October 2025

Personal information
- Born: 29 April 1993 (age 33) Belfast, Northern Ireland

Professional wrestling career
- Ring name: Myla G Myla Grace
- Billed height: 160 cm (5 ft 3 in)
- Billed weight: 52 kg (115 lb)
- Debut: 2018

Shannon Mateer better known by her ring name Myla Grace is an Irish professional wrestler. She is best known for her tenures with various promotions from the British and Irish independent scene such as Over The Top Wrestling, where she is the reigning OTT Women's Champion. She is also known for her time in Total Nonstop Action Wrestling (TNA).

== Professional wrestling career ==
=== British independent circuit (2018–present) ===
Mateer made her professional wrestling debut at PWU Live!!! Culture Night, a house show promoted by Pro Wrestling Ulster on September 19, 2018, where she teamed up with Rhia O'Reilly, Skye James and Lauren La Roux to defeat Dimitri Krakovic, Mitch Baxter and The Enterprise (Liam Royal and Luke Cullen).

=== WWE NXT (2021-2022) ===
Mateer competed in several matches promoted by the WWE NXT UK brand. She made her first appearance at the WWE NXT UK #168 on October 6, 2021, where she fell short to Amale in singles competition. She left WWE in June 2022.

=== Dream Star Fighting Marigold (2024) ===
Mateer briefly competed in Dream Star Fighting Marigold in 2024 as foreign talent. She made her debut at the promotion's very first pay-per-view, Marigold Fields Forever from May 20, 2024, where she teamed up with Nagisa Nozaki in a losing effort against Mai Sakurai and Zayda Steel. Two months later at Marigold Summer Destiny 2024, she teamed up with Steel in a losing effort against Dark Wolf Army (Nagisa Nozaki and Chiaki). At Marigold Summer Gold Shine 2024 on August 19, Mateer teamed up with Steel, Chiaki and Bozilla, and wrestled Kizuna Tanaka, Mirai, Utami Hayashishita and Victoria Yuzuki into a time-limit draw. She fell short to Yuzuki in a qualifier match for the 2024 edition of the Marigold Dream Star GP blocks. On the sixth night of the Marigold Winter Wonderful Fight 2024 series of evens, Grace unsuccessfully challenged Natsumi Showzuki for the Marigold Super Fly Championship. She wrestled her last match in the promotion on December 26, 2024, where she teamed up with Bozilla to unsuccessfully challenge Chiaki and Nagisa Nozaki for the Marigold Twin Star Championship.

=== Total Nonstop Action Wrestling (2025–2026) ===
Mateer made her Total Nonstop Action Wrestling debut in on the preshow of Against All Odds on June 6, 2025, where she teamed up with Xia Brookside and Harley Hudson in a losing effort against The Elegance Brand (Ash by Elegance, Heather by Elegance, and M by Elegance). At the 2026 No Surrender, she competed in a Knockouts battle royal for a future TNA Knockouts World Championship, bout won by Jody Threat. In June 2026, Grace was granted her release from the promotion.

== Championships and accomplishments ==
- Chris Jericho's Rock 'N' Wrestling Rager at Sea
  - Jericho Cruise Women's Oceanic Championship (1 time, current)
- Over The Top Wrestling
  - OTT Women's Championship (1 time, current)
- Pro Wrestling Illustrated
  - Ranked No. 197 of the top 250 female singles wrestlers in the PWI Women's 250 in 2024
- Slammasters Wrestling
  - SMW Women's Championship (1 time, current)
- Titanic Wrestling
  - Titanic Women's Championship (1 time)
- World Series Wrestling
  - WSW Women's Championship (2 times)
