= Marigold Winter Wonderful Fight 2024 =

2024 Dream Star Fighting Marigold event

Marigold Winter Wonderful Fight 2024 (Night 1)
- Promotional poster for the event featuring Miku Aono and Natsumi Showzuki
- Promotion: Dream Star Fighting Marigold
- Date: November 14, 2024
- City: Tokyo, Japan
- Venue: Korakuen Hall
- Attendance: 715

Event chronology
← Previous; Fantastic Adventure 2024	Next → First Dream 2025

Marigold Winter Wonderful Fight 2024 was a multiple-night professional wrestling event promoted by Dream Star Fighting Marigold. The pay-per-view events of the event took place on November 14 and December 13, 2024, in Tokyo, Japan at the Korakuen Hall. The events aired globally on CyberFight's video-on-demand service Wrestle Universe.

== Production ==
=== Background ===
The show featured professional wrestling matches that result from scripted storylines, where wrestlers portrayed villains, heroes, or less distinguishable characters in the scripted events that built tension and culminated in a wrestling match or series of matches.

== Night 1 ==
=== Event ===
The first night of the event took place on November 14, 2024. The show started with the singles confrontation between Naho Yamada and Hummingbird, solded with the victory of the latter. In the second bout, Yuuki Minami picked up a victory over Rea Seto in another singles battle. Next up, Bozilla and Myla Grace outmatched Misa Matsui and Komomo Minami in tag team competition. The fourth bout saw Nagisa Nozaki and Chiaki defeating Victoria Yuzuki and Kizuna Tanaka in tag team competition. In the fifth bout, Mirai and Mai Sakurai wrestled Utami Hayashishita and GHC Women's Champion Kouki Amarei in a time-limit draw, therefore retaining the Marigold Twin Star Championship for the fourth time in that respective reign. In the semi main event, Miku Aono defeated Marigold Super Fly Champion Natsumi Showzuki to retain the Marigold United National Championship for the third consecutive time in that respective reign. After the bout concluded, Mai Sakurai challenged Aono for the title in a bout which was scheduled to take place at Marigold First Dream on January 3, 2025.

In the main event, Marigold World Champion Sareee defeated Nao Ishikawa in a bout dubbed as a "Special Passion match". After the bout concluded, Nanae Takahashi stepped up to challenge Sareee for the World Championship in a bout which was scheduled for the second night of the event from December 13.

=== Results ===
No.	Results	Stipulations	Times
1	Hummingbird defeated Naho Yamada by pinfall	Singles match	8:16
2	Yuuki Minami defeated Rea Seto by submission	Singles match	5:12
3	Bozilla and Myla Grace defeated Misa Matsui and Komomo Minami by pinfall	Tag team match	9:22
4	Dark Wolf Army (Nagisa Nozaki and Chiaki) defeated Selene Flora (Victoria Yuzuki and Kizuna Tanaka) by pinfall	Tag team match	11:35
5	MiraiSaku (Mirai and Mai Sakurai) (c) vs. Utami Hayashishita and Kouki Amarei ended in a time-limit draw	Tag team match for the Marigold Twin Star Championship	30:00
6	Miku Aono (c) defeated Natsumi Showzuki by submission	Singles match for the Marigold United National Championship	13:12
7	Sareee defeated Nao Ishikawa by pinfall	Singles match	10:49
(c) / – the champion(s) heading into the match

== Night 2 ==
Marigold Winter Wonderful Fight 2024 (Night 2)
- Promotional poster for the event featuring Sareee and Nanae Takahashi
- Promotion: Dream Star Fighting Marigold
- Date: December 13, 2024
- City: Tokyo, Japan
- Venue: Shinjuku Face
- Attendance: 464

=== Event ===
The second night of the event took place on December 13, 2024.

In the opening confrontation, Rea Seto picked up a victory over Komomo Minami and Minami Yuuki in a three-way bout. Next up, Bozilla and Misa Matsui defeated Nao Ishikawa and Hummingbird in tag team competition. The third bout saw Utami Hayashishita, Kouki Amarei and Victoria Yuzuki defeating Miku Aono, Chika Goto and Naho Yamada in six-woman tag team competition. Next up, Natsumi Showzuki defeated Myla Grace to secure the third consecutive defense of the Marigold Super Fly Championship in that respective reign. After the bout concluded, Showzuki received a challenge from Victoria Yuzuki in a bout which was scheduled to take place at Marigold First Dream 2025 on January 3. In the semi main event, Nagisa Nozaki and Chiaki defeated Mirai and Mai Sakurai to win the Marigold Twin Star Championship, ending the latter team's reign at 136 days and four successful defenses. This also marked the first-ever title change in the promotion of Dream Star Fighting Marigold. After the bout concluded, Bozilla challenged Nozaki and Chiaki to a title match alongside a mystery partner in a bout which was scheduled to take place at Marigold First Dream 2025 on January 3.

In the main event, Sareee defeated Nanae Takahashi to secure the second consecutive defense of the Marigold World Championship in that respective reign.

=== Results ===
No.	Results	Stipulations	Times
1	Rea Seto defeated Komomo Minami and Minami Yuuki	Three-way match	5:16
2	Bozilla and Misa Matsui defeated Nao Ishikawa and Hummingbird	Tag team match	8:46
3	Utami Hayashishita, Kouki Amarei and Victoria Yuzuki defeated Miku Aono, Chika Goto and Naho Yamada	Six-woman tag team match	13:07
4	Natsumi Showzuki (c) defeated Myla Grace	Singles match for the Marigold Super Fly Championship	8:41
5	Dark Wolf Army (Nagisa Nozaki and Chiaki) defeated MiraiSaku (Mirai and Mai Sakurai) (c)	Tag team match for the Marigold Twin Star Championship	15:28
6	Sareee (c) defeated Nanae Takahashi by referee stoppage	Singles match for the Marigold World Championship	21:23
(c) / – the champion(s) heading into the match
