= Bozilla =

German professional wrestler

Personal information
- Born: 31 August 2003 (age 23) Hanover, Lower Saxony, Germany
- Family: Ulf Herman (father)

Professional wrestling career
- Ring name: Bozilla Bo Joy
- Billed height: 181 cm (5 ft 11 in)
- Billed weight: 93 kg (205 lb)
- Trained by: Can-Am Dojo; Josh Alexander; Scott D'Amore; Ulf Herman
- Debut: 2022

Bozilla (born 31 August 2003) is a German professional wrestler. She is signed to World Wonder Ring Stardom, where she is a member of Mi Vida Loca. Prior to Stardom, she was best known for her time with Dream Star Fighting Marigold. She previously performed with various promotions from the German and European independent scene promotions.

== Professional wrestling career ==
=== German independent circuit (2022–present) ===
Bozilla made her professional wrestling debut in the end of 2022 at an independent wrestling show in Germany, where she teamed up with her real life father Ulf Herman. She also competed in promotions such as Championship Of Wrestling (cOw), Independent Wrestling Innovation (IWI) and Power Of Wrestling (POW). She then later moved to Canada to train at the Can-Am Dojo with Scott D'Amore and Josh Alexander.

=== Dream Star Fighting Marigold (2024–2025) ===
In April 2024, Bozilla was announced as a foreign competitor of the newly created promotion of Dream Star Fighting Marigold. At the inaugural event, the Fields Forever from May 20, she teamed up with Sareee to defeat Giulia and Utami Hayashishita. At Summer Destiny on July 13, Bozilla fell short to Miku Aono in the finals for the inaugural Marigold United National Championship, in a tournament in which she also defeated Nagisa Nozaki in the first rounds. At Summer Gold Shine on August 19, she teamed up with Chiaki, Myla Grace and Zayda Steel to defeat Hayashishita, Mirai, Kizuna Tanaka and Victoria Yuzuki. In the 2024 Dream Star Grand Prix, Bozilla competed in the Star League of the tournament where she scored a total of ten points, failing to qualify for the finals. On the first night of the Fantastic Adventure event from October 7, she teamed up with Nagisa Nozaki to defeat Sareee and Miku Aono. The storyline conducted Bozilla to unsuccessfully challenge Sareee for the Marigold World Championship on the second night of the event from October 24 after the latter demanded Bozilla to eventually lay the challenge. On the first night of the Winter Wonderful Fight event from November 14, she teamed up with Myla Grace to defeat Misa Matsui and Komomo Minami in tag team competition.

At First Dream 2025 on January 3, Bozilla teamed up with Tank to defeat Dark Wolf Army (Nagisa Nozaki and Chiaki) for the Marigold Twin Star Championship.

Japanese independent circuit (2024–present) During her Japan excursion, Bozilla often competed in the Japanese independent scene as a joshi special talent sent by Dream Star Fighting Marigold. On the finals night of the 2024 edition of Pro Wrestling Noah's N-1 Victory, Bozilla teamed up with Kizuna Tanaka, Kouki Amarei and Miku Aono in a losing effort against Great Sakuya, Miyuki Takase, Sandra Moone and Takumi Iroha. At Monday Magic Autumn Vol. 3 on November 11, 2024, Bozilla competed in a battle royal to determine the inaugural GHC Women's Champion won by Kouki Amarei.

=== World Wonder Ring Stardom (2025–present) ===
At The Conversion on June 21, 2025, Bozilla made her official debut by helping Mi Vida Loca pick up the win against Neo Genesis. She had a Title Match with AZM for the Strong Women's Championship and lost. In the 5 Star Grand Prix 2025 she received an Award for “Blue Stars Best Match” with Saori Aonu.

=== All Elite Wrestling (AEW) (2025-present) ===
On August 24, Bozilla represented Stardom at Forbidden Door 2025 at the O2 Arena in London, England in a 4way Match against Mercedes Moné, Alex Windsorand Persephone. With that she was the first German Pro Wrestler to work for All Elite Wrestling.

== Championships and accomplishments ==
Pro Wrestling Cyprus

  - Cyprus First Ever Female Pro Wrestling Champ
- Athletik Club Wrestling
  - ACW Tag Team Championship (1 time) – with Ulf Herman
- Dream Star Fighting Marigold
  - Marigold Twin Star Championship (1 time) – with Tank
  - Dream★Star GP Award (1 time)
    - Outstanding Performance Award (2024)
  - Marigold Year-End Award (1 time)
    - Fighting Spirit Award (2024)
- Pro Wrestling Illustrated
  - Ranked No. 75 of the top 250 female wrestlers in the PWI Women's 250 in 2024
- Sirius Sports Entertainment
  - Sirius Women's Championship (1 time)
- World Wonder Ring Stardom
  - 5★Star GP Awards
    - Blue Stars Best Match Award (2025) vs. Saori Anou on August 6 in Blue Stars A
