= Marigold Dream Star Grand Prix 2024 =

2024 Dream Star Fighting Marigold wrestling tournament

- Promotional poster of the event
- Promotion: Dream Star Fighting Marigold
- Date: August 31 – September 28, 2024
- City: Osaka, Japan; Toyama, Japan; Tokyo, Japan; Sendai, Miyagi, Japan; Morioka, Iwate, Japan; Nagoya, Aichi, Japan
- Venue: Edion Arena Osaka; Bolfert Toyama 2F Multipurpose Hall; Shin-Kiba 1st Ring; Korakuen Hall; Sendai PIT; Morioka City Gymnasium; Nagoya Congress Center

Event chronology
← Previous; Gold Shine 2024	Next → Fantastic Adventure 2024

Dream Star Grand Prix chronology
← Previous; First	Next → 2025

Marigold Dream Star Grand Prix
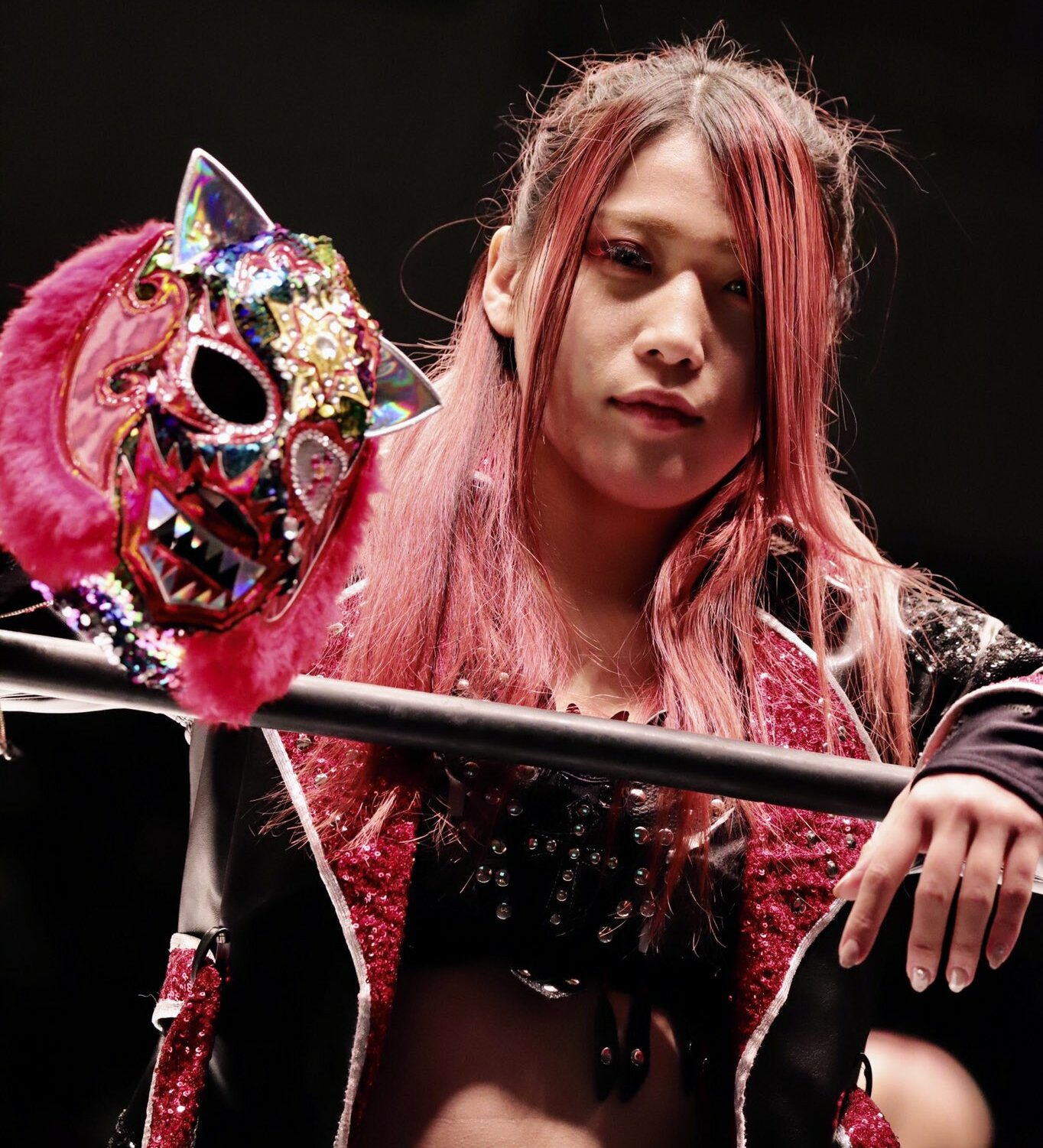
- Utami Hayashishita, winner of the 2024 Dream Star Grand Prix.

Tournament information
- Sport: Professional wrestling
- Location: Japan
- Dates: August 31, 2024–September 28, 2024
- Tournament format: Two-block round-robin
- Participants: 16

Final positions
- Champions: Utami Hayashishita
- Runner-up: Mai Sakurai

Tournament statistics
- Attendance: 4,050
- Bouts fought: 57

Marigold Dream Star Grand Prix 2024 (マリーゴールドドリームスターグランプリ2024, Marīgōrudo dorīmu sutā guranpuri 2024), stylized as DREAM✴︎STAR GP 2024, was a professional wrestling tournament promoted by the Japanese promotion Dream Star Fighting Marigold. It took place between August 31 and September 28, 2024.

== Tournament history ==
The Dream Star Grand Prix is a professional wrestling tournament held by Marigold. Similar to Bushiroad-owned counterpart tournaments New Japan Pro-Wrestling's G1 Climax and Stardom 5 Star Grand Prix, it is held as a round-robin tournament with wrestlers split into two pools. The winner of each pool will compete in the final to decide the winner. As is the case with Bushiroad tournaments, a win is two points and a draw is one point for each wrestler.

=== Storylines ===
The event featured professional wrestling matches that resulted from scripted storylines, where wrestlers portrayed villains, heroes, or less distinguishable characters in the scripted events that built tension and culminated in a wrestling match or series of matches.

== Qualifiers ==
The format of the tournament will saw 16 wrestlers divided in two blocks. Marigold initially announced twelve contestants with three extra having to undergo a series of qualifying matches and one person from another organization.

=== Qualifying matches ===
August 3
No.	Results	Stipulations	Times
1	Chika Goto defeated Nao Ishikawa by pinfall	Dream Star Grand Prix Qualifying match	9:37

August 10
No.	Results	Stipulations	Times
1	Kizuna Tanaka defeated Komomo Minami by pinfall	Dream Star Grand Prix Qualifying match	7:28
2	Victoria Yuzuki defeated Myla Grace by pinfall	Dream Star Grand Prix Qualifying match	7:10

== Participants ==
*Noted underneath are the champions who held their titles at the time of the tournament. The titleholders or even the number of contestants can change over time.

Wrestler	Notes
Bozilla	
Chiaki	
Kouki Amarei	
Mai Sakurai	Marigold Twin Star Champion
Miku Aono	Marigold United National Champion
Mirai	Marigold Twin Star Champion
Misa Matsui	
Nanae Takahashi	
Nagisa Nozaki	Freelancer
Natsumi Showzuki	Marigold Super Fly Champion
Sareee	Freelancer; Marigold World Champion
Utami Hayashishita	Winner
Chika Goto	Qualifying match winner
Victoria Yuzuki	Qualifying match winner
Kizuna Tanaka	Qualifying match winner
Nøri	Ladies Legend Pro-Wrestling

== Standings ==
=== Overview ===
Final standings
Dream League		Star League	
Utami Hayashishita	10	Mai Sakurai	11
Nøri	8	Sareee	10
Kouki Amarei	8	Nanae Takahashi	10
Mirai	8	Bozilla	10
Nagisa Nozaki	8	Miku Aono	9
Natsumi Showzuki	7	Kizuna Tanaka	2
Victoria Yuzuki	5	Chiaki	2
Chika Goto	2	Misa Matsui	2

Dream League	Goto	Amarei	Mirai	Nozaki	Showzuki	Nøri	Hayashishita	Yuzuki
Goto	—N/a	Goto (9:40)	Mirai (9:43)	Nozaki (8:06)	Showzuki (7:46)	Nøri (5:28)	Hayashishita (8:04)	Yuzuki (6:35)
Amarei	Goto (9:40)	—N/a	Amarei (12:03)	Amarei (9:00)	Amarei (11:20)	Nøri (9:53)	Hayashishita (9:03)	Amarei (10:33)
Mirai	Mirai (9:43)	Amarei (12:03)	—N/a	Draw (12:10)	Showzuki (8:04)	Draw (15:00)	Mirai (10:30)	Mirai (9:17)
Nozaki	Nozaki (8:06)	Amarei (9:00)	Draw (12:10)	—N/a	Showzuki (10:11)	Draw (15:00)	Nozaki (8:47)	Nozaki (9:21)
Showzuki	Showzuki	Amarei (11:20)	Showzuki (8:04)	Showzuki (10:11)	—N/a	Nøri (11:11)	Hayashishita (9:18)	Draw (15:00)
Nøri	Nøri (5:28)	Nøri (9:53)	Draw (15:00)	Draw (15:00)	Nøri (11:11)	—N/a	Hayashishita (10:03)	Yuzuki (5:58)
Hayashishita	Hayashishita (8:04)	Hayashishita (9:03)	Mirai (10:30)	Nozaki (8:47)	Hayashishita (9:18)	Hayashishita (10:03)	—N/a	Hayashishita (8:07)
Yuzuki	Yuzuki (6:35)	Amarei (10:33)	Mirai (9:17)	Nozaki (9:21)	Draw (15:00)	Yuzuki (5:58)	Hayashishita (8:07)	—N/a
Star League	Bozilla	Chiaki	Tanaka	Sakurai	Aono	Matsui	Takahashi	Sareee
Bozilla	—N/a	Bozilla (5:46)	Bozilla (5:10)	Sakurai (11:38)	Bozilla (8:58)	Bozilla (6:28)	Takahashi (8:48)	Bozilla (9:30)
Chiaki	Bozilla (5:46)	—N/a	Tanaka (7:13)	Sakurai (7:30)	Aono (6:31)	Chiaki (6:28)	Takahashi (6:25)	Sareee (6:57)
Tanaka	Bozilla (5:10)	Tanaka (7:13)	—N/a	Sakurai (8:06)	Aono (9:02)	Matsui (6:09)	Takahashi (9:56)	Sareee (9:48)
Sakurai	Sakurai (11:38)	Sakurai (7:30)	Sakurai (8:06)	—N/a	Draw (15:00)	Sakurai (6:22)	Sakurai (13:53)	Sareee (11:13)
Aono	Bozilla (8:58)	Aono (6:31)	Aono (9:02)	Draw (15:00)	—N/a	Aono (6:44)	Draw (15:00)	Draw (15:00)
Matsui	Bozilla (6:28)	Chiaki (6:28)	Matsui (6:09)	Sakurai (6:22)	Aono (6:44)	—N/a	Takahashi (11:03)	Sareee (9:16)
Takahashi	Takahashi (8:48)	Takahashi (6:25)	Takahashi (9:56)	Sakurai (13:53)	Draw (15:00)	Takahashi (11:03)	—N/a	Draw (15:00)
Sareee	Bozilla (9:30)	Sareee (6:57)	Sareee (9:48)	Sareee (11:13)	Draw (15:00)	Sareee (9:16)	Draw (15:00)	—N/a

Final
Dream	Utami Hayashishita	Pin
Star	Mai Sakurai	16:38

== Results ==
=== Day 1 (Afternoon) ===
This event took place in the afternoon of August 31, 2024.

No.	Results	Stipulations	Times
1	Myla Grace defeated Komomo Minami, Minami Yuuki and Chiaki by pinfall	Four-way match	6:00
2	Bozilla defeated Kizuna Tanaka by pinfall	Star League match in the 2024 Dream Star Grand Prix	5:10
3	Natsumi Showzuki vs. Victoria Yuzuki ended in a time-limit draw	Dream League match in the 2024 Dream Star Grand Prix	15:00
4	Nøri defeated Kouki Amarei by pinfall	Dream League Match in the 2024 Dream Star Grand Prix	9:53
5	Miku Aono defeated Misa Matsui by pinfall	Star League match in the 2024 Dream Star Grand Prix	6:44
6	Mirai defeated Chika Goto by submission	Dream League match in the 2024 Dream Star Grand Prix	9:43
7	Nagisa Nozaki defeated Utami Hayashishita by pinfall	Dream League match in the 2024 Dream Star Grand Prix	8:47
8	Mai Sakurai defeated Nanae Takahashi by referee stoppage	Star League match in the 2024 Dream Star Grand Prix	13:53

=== Day 1 (Evening) ===
This took place on the evening of August 31, 2024.

No.	Results	Stipulations	Times
1	Kizuna Tanaka defeated Myla Grace by pinfall	Singles match	3:41
2	Mai Sakurai and Victoria Yuzuki defeated Kouki Amarei and Minami Yuuki by pinfall	Tag team match	6:17
3	Bozilla defeated Misa Matsui by pinfall	Star League match in the 2024 Dream Star Grand Prix	6:28
4	Miku Aono defeated Chiaki by pinfall	Star League match in the 2024 Dream Star Grand Prix	6:31
5	Mirai vs. Nøri ended in a time-limit draw	Dream League match in the 2024 Dream Star Grand Prix	15:00
6	Utami Hayashishita defeated Chika Goto by pinfall	Dream League match in the 2024 Dream Star Grand Prix	8:04
7	Natsumi Showzuki defeated Nagisa Nozaki by pinfall	Dream League match in the 2024 Dream Star Grand Prix	10:11

=== Day 2 ===
Day 2 took place on September 8, 2024.

No.	Results	Stipulations	Times
1	Kizuna Tanaka and Mirai defeated Myla Grace and Chiaki by pinfall	Tag team match	8:07
2	Nøri defeated Chika Goto by pinfall	Dream League match in the 2024 Dream Star Grand Prix	5:28
3	Utami Hayashishita defeated Victoria Yuzuki by pinfall	Dream League match in the 2024 Dream Star Grand Prix	8:07
4	Kouki Amarei defeated Natsumi Showzuki by pinfall	Dream League match in the 2024 Dream Star Grand Prix	11:20
5	Nanae Takahashi defeated Misa Matsui by pinfall	Star League match in the 2024 Dream Star Grand Prix	11:03
6	Bozilla defeated Miku Aono by pinfall	Star League match in the 2024 Dream Star Grand Prix	8:58
7	Sareee defeated Mai Sakurai by pinfall	Star League match in the 2024 Dream Star Grand Prix	11:13

=== Day 3 ===
Day 3 took place on September 14, 2024.

No.	Results	Stipulations	Times
1	Myla Grace defeated Nao Ishikawa and Yuuki Minami by pinfall	Tag team match	6:37
2	Mirai, Misa Matsui and Utami Hayashishita defeated Chika Goto, Miku Aono and Natsumi Showzuki by pinfall	Six-woman tag team match	7:30
3	Sareee defeated Chiaki by pinfall	Star League match in the 2024 Dream Star Grand Prix	6:57
4	Kouki Amarei defeated Victoria Yuzuki by pinfall	Dream League match in the 2024 Dream Star Grand Prix	10:33
5	Nagisa Nozaki vs. Nøri ended in a time-limit draw	Dream League match in the 2024 Dream Star Grand Prix	15:00
6	Nanae Takahashi defeated Kizuna Tanaka by pinfall	Star League match in the 2024 Dream Star Grand Prix	9:56
7	Mai Sakurai defeated Bozilla by countout	Star League match in the 2024 Dream Star Grand Prix	11:38

=== Day 4 ===
Day 4 took place on September 16, 2024.

No.	Results	Stipulations	Times
1^{P}	Kouki Amarei defeated Myla Grace, Nao Ishikawa and Minami Yuuki by submission	Four-way match	5:44
2	Chiaki defeated Misa Matsui by pinfall	Star League match in the 2024 Dream Star Grand Prix	6:28
3	Victoria Yuzuki defeated Chika Goto by pinfall	Dream League match in the 2024 Dream Star Grand Prix	6:35
4	Mai Sakurai defeated Kizuna Tanaka by submission	Star League match in the 2024 Dream Star Grand Prix	8:06
5	Nøri defeated Natsumi Showzuki by pinfall	Dream League match in the 2024 Dream Star Grand Prix	11:11
6	Nanae Takahashi defeated Bozilla by pinfall	Star League match in the 2024 Dream Star Grand Prix	8:48
7	Miku Aono vs. Sareee ended in a time-limit draw	Star League match in the 2024 Dream Star Grand Prix	15:00
8	Mirai defeated Utami Hayashishita by pinfall	Dream League match in the 2024 Dream Star Grand Prix	10:30
P / – the match was broadcast on the pre-show

=== Day 5 ===
Day 5 took place on September 20, 2024.

No.	Results	Stipulations	Times
1	Bozilla and Myla Grace defeated Komomo Minami, Nao Ishikawa and Victoria Yuzuki by pinfall	Three-on-two handicap match	8:03
2	Nagisa Nozaki defeated Chika Goto by pinfall	Dream League match in the 2024 Dream Star Grand Prix	8:06
3	Miku Aono defeated Kizuna Tanaka by pinfall	Star League match in the 2024 Dream Star Grand Prix	9:02
4	Nanae Takahashi defeated Chiaki by pinfall	Star League match in the 2024 Dream Star Grand Prix	6:25
5	Sareee defeated Misa Matsui by pinfall	Star League match in the 2024 Dream Star Grand Prix	9:16
6	Utami Hayashishita defeated Natsumi Showzuki	Dream League match in the 2024 Dream Star Grand Prix	9:18
7	Kouki Amarei defeated Mirai by pinfall	Dream League match in the 2024 Dream Star Grand Prix	12:03

=== Day 6 ===
Day 6 took place on September 21, 2024.

No.	Results	Stipulations	Times
1	Chika Goto, Komomo Minami and Nao Ishikawa defeated Bozilla and Myla Grace by pinfall	Three-on-two handicap match	6:36
2	Miku Aono and Utami Hayashishita defeated Misa Matsui and Natsumi Showzuki by pinfall	Tag team match	8:11
3	Mai Sakurai defeated Chiaki by submission	Star League match in the 2024 Dream Star Grand Prix	7:30
4	Kouki Amarei defeated Nagisa Nozaki by pinfall	Dream League match in the 2024 Dream Star Grand Prix	9:00
5	Sareee defeated Kizuna Tanaka by pinfall	Star League match in the 2024 Dream Star Grand Prix	9:48
6	Mirai defeated Victoria Yuzuki by pinfall	Dream League match in the 2024 Dream Star Grand Prix	9:17

=== Day 7 ===
Day 7 took place on September 23, 2024.

No.	Results	Stipulations	Times
1	Myla Grace and Nao Ishikawa defeated Komomo Minami and Minami Yuuki by pinfall	Tag team match	4:30
2	Misa Matsui defeated Kizuna Tanaka by pinfall	Star League match in the 2024 Dream Star Grand Prix	6:09
3	Bozilla defeated Chiaki by pinfall	Star League match in the 2024 Dream Star Grand Prix	5:46
4	Nanae Takahashi vs. Sareee ended in a time-limit draw	Star League match in the 2024 Dream Star Grand Prix	15:00
5	Nagisa Nozaki defeated Victoria Yuzuki by pinfall	Dream League match in the 2024 Dream Star Grand Prix	9:21
6	Natsumi Showzuki defeated Mirai by pinfall	Dream League match in the 2024 Dream Star Grand Prix	8:04
7	Chika Goto defeated Kouki Amarei by pinfall	Dream League match in the 2024 Dream Star Grand Prix	9:40
8	Mai Sakurai vs. Miku Aono ended in a time-limit draw	Star League match in the 2024 Dream Star Grand Prix	15:00
9	Utami Hayashishita defeated Nøri by pinfall	Dream League match in the 2024 Dream Star Grand Prix	10:03

=== Day 8 ===
The eighth and final day took place on September 28, 2024.

No.	Results	Stipulations	Times
1^{P}	Myla Grace defeated Nao Ishikawa and Komomo Minami by pinfall	Three-way match	5:42
2	Natsumi Showzuki defeated Chika Goto by pinfall	Dream League match in the 2024 Dream Star Grand Prix	7:46
3	Victoria Yuzuki defeated NØRI by pinfall	Dream League match in the 2024 Dream Star Grand Prix	5:58
4	Mirai vs. Nagisa Nozaki ended in a double countout	Dream League match in the 2024 Dream Star Grand Prix	12:10
5	Utami Hayashishita defeated Kouki Amarei by pinfall	Dream League match in the 2024 Dream Star Grand Prix	9:03
6	Kizuna Tanaka defeated Chiaki by pinfall	Star League match in the 2024 Dream Star Grand Prix	7:13
7	Mai Sakurai defeated Misa Matsui by submission	Star League match in the 2024 Dream Star Grand Prix	6:22
8	Nanae Takahashi vs. Miku Aono ended in a time-limit draw	Star League match in the 2024 Dream Star Grand Prix	15:00
9	Bozilla defeated Sareee by pinfall	Star League match in the 2024 Dream Star Grand Prix	9:30
10	Utami Hayashishita defeated Mai Sakurai by pinfall	Dream Star Grand Prix tournament final	16:38
P / – the match was broadcast on the pre-show
