= Marigold Year-End Awards =

Professional wrestling award

- Country: Japan
- Presented by: Dream Star Fighting Marigold
- First award: December 31, 2024; 22 months ago

The Marigold Year-End Awards is a concept used by Dream Star Fighting Marigold where awards, similar to World Wonder Ring Stardom's Year-End Awards, are given to professional wrestlers at the end of the year who have performed in Marigold. The first award ceremony took place on December 31, 2024.

== Active awards ==
=== MVP Award ===
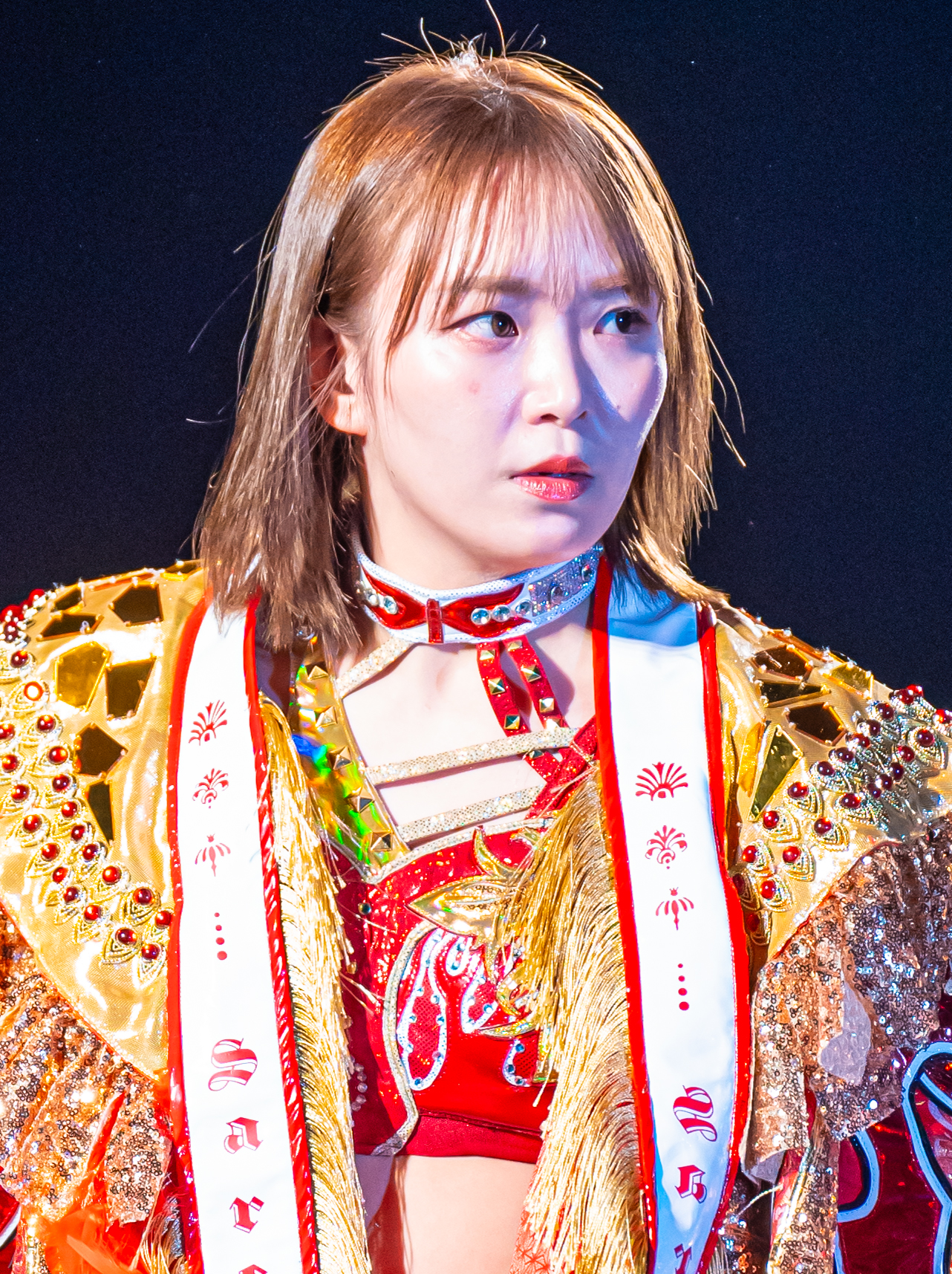
Sareee, the inaugural Marigold MVP

Year	Wrestler
2024	Sareee
2025	Miku Aono

=== Best Match Award ===
Year	Date	Match	Event	Location	Notes
2024	December 13, 2024	Nanae Takahashi vs. Sareee	Winter Wonderful Fight	Tokyo, Japan	For the Marigold World Championship
2025	October 26, 2025	Mayu Iwatani vs. IYO SKY	Grand Destiny	Tokyo, Japan	

=== Best Tag Team Award ===
Year	Team
2024	MiraiSaku (MIRAI and Mai Sakurai)
2025	Darkness Revolution (Misa Matsui and CHIAKI)

=== Fighting Spirit Award ===
Year	Wrestler
2024	Bozilla
2025	Utami Hayashishita

=== Outstanding Performance Award ===
Year	Wrestler
2024	Utami Hayashishita
2025	Victoria Yuzuki

=== SHINE Award ===
Year	Wrestler
2024	Kouki Amarei
2025	Seri Yamaoka

=== Technique Award ===
Year	Wrestler
2024	Miku Aono
2025	Mai Sakurai

== See also ==
- List of professional wrestling awards
- Stardom Year-End Awards
- Slammy Awards
