= Marigold Summer Destiny 2024 =

2024 Dream Star Fighting Marigold event

- Promotional poster for the event featuring various participants
- Promotion: Dream Star Fighting Marigold
- Date: July 13, 2024
- City: Tokyo, Japan
- Venue: Ryogoku Kokugikan
- Attendance: 3,058

Pay-per-view chronology
← Previous; Fields Forever	Next → Summer Gold Shine

Summer Destiny chronology
← Previous; First	Next → 2026

Marigold Summer Destiny 2024 was a professional wrestling event promoted by Dream Star Fighting Marigold. It took place on July 13, 2024, in Tokyo, Japan at the Ryogoku Kokugikan.

Nine matches were contested at the event, including two on the pre-show. The main event saw Sareee defeat Giulia to become the inaugural Marigold World Champion. In other prominent matches, WWE's Iyo Sky defeated Utami Hayashishita, and both Miku Aono and Natsumi Showzuki defeated Bozilla and Misa Matsui in tournament finals to become the inaugural Marigold United National Champion and Marigold Super Fly Champion respectively.

== Production ==
=== Background ===
The show featured professional wrestling matches that result from scripted storylines, where wrestlers portrayed villains, heroes, or less distinguishable characters in the scripted events that built tension and culminated in a wrestling match or series of matches.

=== Storylines ===
On May 20, 2024, during the main event of Fields Forever, Marigold's first show, Bozilla alongside Sareee defeated Giulia and Utami Hayashishita, where Giulia suffered a broken wrist. After their match, Sareee challenged Giulia to a singles match, which was scheduled to Summer Destiny. Giulia was later clear to wrestle Sareee at the event. On July 12, it was confirmed that the winner between the two would be the inaugural World Champion.

On June 11, after Utami Hayashishita defeated Nanae Takahashi, WWE's Iyo Sky made a surprise announcement by challenging Hayashishita at Summer Destiny.

On June 23, Misa Matsui and Natsumi Showzuki advanced in a four-way tournament to compete against each other at Summer Destiny to determine the inaugural Super Fly Champion.

On June 16, a four-way tournament was launched to determine the inaugural United National Champion. While Bozilla advanced to the finals, Miku Aono and Mirai kept wrestling to a time limit draw. Therefore, it was determined that Aono and Mirai would face each other at Summer Destiny, with the winner would face Bozilla at the tournament finals.

=== Event ===
The event started with two preshow bouts. In the first one, Rea Seto defeated Komomo Minami in singles competition, and in the second one, Kouki Amarei and Chika Goto vs. Victoria Yuzuki and Kizuna Tanaka wrestled into a ten-minute time-limit draw in tag team action.

Before the first match of the main card took place, Michiko Omukai presented her eldest daughter Shinno as the newest trainee of the promotion. The first main card match saw Nagisa Nozaki and Chiaki picking up a victory over Myla Grace and Zayda Steel in tag team competition. Next up, Natsumi Showzuki defeated Misa Matsui to become the inaugural Marigold Super Fly Champion. In the next bout, Ladies Legend Pro-Wrestling veterans Shinobu Kandori and Takako Inoue teamed up with ex-Ice Ribbon's NØRI to defeat Nanae Takahashi, Mai Sakurai and Nao Ishikawa. In the sixth match of the night, Miku Aono defeated Mirai in the first rounds of the inaugural Marigold United National Championship tournament after they previously faced each other for the same stake a couple of times. In the very next bout, Aono succeeded in defeating Bozilla to become the inaugural champion. In the semi main event, Iyo Sky defeated Utami Hayashishita.

In the main event, Sareee defeated Giulia to become the inaugural Marigold World Champion.

== Results ==
No.	Results	Stipulations	Times
1^{P}	Rea Seto defeated Komomo Minami by pinfall	Singles match	8:23
2^{P}	tWin toWer (Kouki Amarei and Chika Goto) vs. Selene Flora (Victoria Yuzuki and Kizuna Tanaka) ended in a time-limit draw	Tag team match	10:00
3	Dark Wolf Army (Nagisa Nozaki and Chiaki) defeated Myla Grace and Zayda Steel by pinfall	Tag team match	8:40
4	Natsumi Showzuki defeated Misa Matsui by pinfall	Tournament final match for the inaugural Marigold Super Fly Championship	14:51
5	Team LLPW-X (Shinobu Kandori, Takako Inoue and NØRI) defeated Team Marigold (Nanae Takahashi, Mai Sakurai and Nao Ishikawa) by pinfall	Six-woman tag team match	15:33
6	Miku Aono defeated Mirai by pinfall	Tournament first round for the inaugural Marigold United National Championship	24:14
7	Miku Aono defeated Bozilla by pinfall	Tournament final match for the inaugural Marigold United National Championship	10:13
8	Iyo Sky defeated Utami Hayashishita by pinfall	Singles match	23:01
9	Sareee defeated Giulia by referee stoppage	Singles match for the inaugural Marigold World Championship	25:48
P / – the match was broadcast on the pre-show
