= Sareee =

Japanese professional wrestler (born 1996)

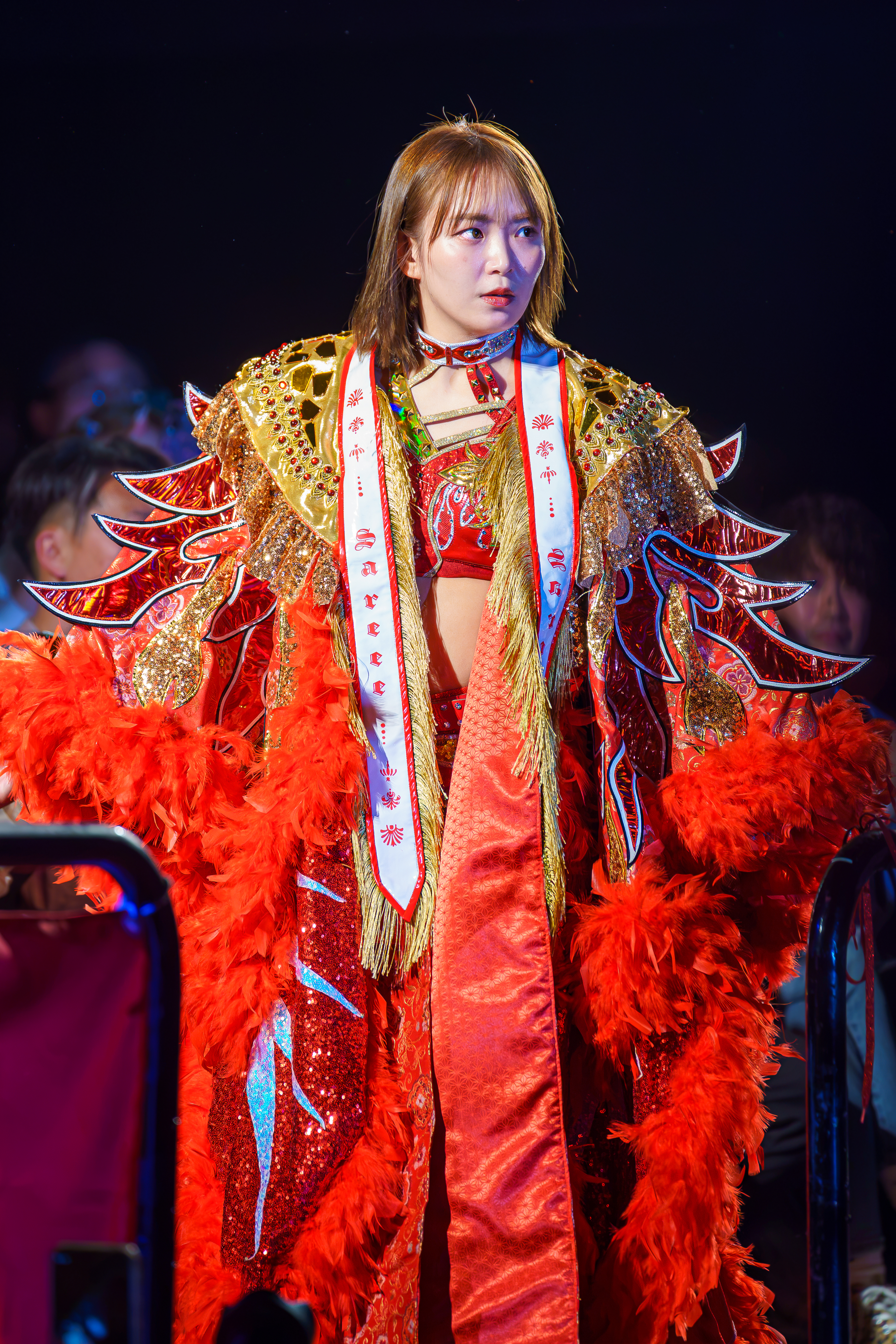
- Sareee in 2025

Personal information
- Born: Sari Fujimura (藤村 沙里, Fujimura Sari); March 31, 1996 (age 30) Itabashi-ku, Tokyo, Japan

Professional wrestling career
- Ring name(s): Sareee; Sareee Bomb; Sarray
- Billed height: 158 cm (5 ft 2 in)
- Billed weight: 60 kg
- Trained by: Kyoko Hamaguchi; Kaoru Ito; Kyoko Inoue
- Debut: April 17, 2011

Sari Fujimura (Japanese: 藤村 沙里, Hepburn: Fujimura Sari; born March 31, 1996) better known by the ring name Sareee, is a Japanese joshi professional wrestler. She is primarily performing in Japan as a freelancer. She is also the head producer and booker of Sareee-ISM, a promotion of self-produced shows.

Fujimura is known for her work in promotions such as Dream Star Fighting Marigold, JWP Joshi Puroresu, Pro Wrestling Wave, Seadlinnng, Sendai Girls' Pro Wrestling, World Woman Pro-Wrestling Diana, World Wonder Ring Stardom, and WWE. In Marigold, she was the inaugural Marigold World Champion. She is also a former Beyond the Sea Single Champion, Beyond the Sea Tag Team Champion, IWGP Women's Champion, JWP Junior Champion, Princess of Pro-Wrestling Champion, Sendai Girls World Champion, WWWD World Champion, and WWWD Tag Team Champion.

Fujimura made her debut in April 2011 at the age of 15. She worked for World Woman Pro-Wrestling Diana for six years, before transferring to Seadlinnng in February 2017. After leaving Seadlinnng in September, she returned to Diana, where she competed until January 2020. She then signed with WWE in 2020 and performed for the NXT brand under the ring name Sarray from 2021 to 2023. After her tenure in WWE, she returned to Japan working as a freelancer. In late 2023, she signed with American promotion Sukeban until March 31, 2026

== Professional wrestling career ==
=== World Woman Pro-Wrestling Diana (2011–2020) ===
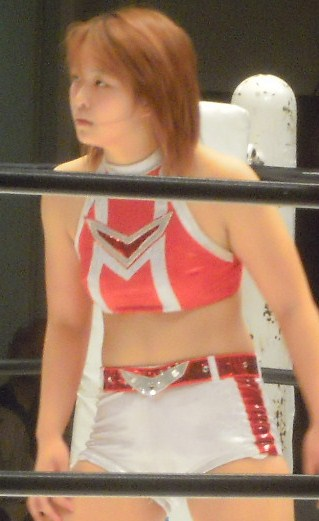
Sareee in 2011

Fujimura initially wanted to join NEO Japan Ladies Pro-Wrestling, but instead opted to train under Kyoko Inoue after she left the promotion in July 2010. While training under Inoue, she also took some extra training in Animal Hamaguchi's dojo under Kyoko Hamaguchi. On February 10, 2011, Inoue signed Sari to her new World Woman Pro-Wrestling Diana promotion as a trainee. She was given the ring name Sareee on March 3, which combined her birth name with the name of the band Greeeen, of which she was a fan. She was originally set to make her debut on Diana's debut show on March 21, 2011, however, due to the effects of the Great East Japan Earthquake and the Fukushima nuclear accident, Diana's first show in Fukushima was cancelled and her debut was postponed until April. She made her debut on April 14, 2011, losing to Meiko Satomura. On May 10, she was selected to face Joshi puroresu legend Aja Kong one on one at Kawasaki City Gymnasium. Despite losing, she kicked out of Kong's vertical drop brainbuster finisher, garnering a large reaction from the crowd. On September 4, she gained her first indirect victory, teaming with Kyoko Inoue to beat Kong and Andrea Mother at a Hikaru produced show. She finally achieved her first singles victory on April 20, 2012, beating Nana Kawasa. On January 28, 2013, she got her first title shot, teaming with Inoue in a loss to Kaoru Ito and Tomoko Watanbe for the vacant Diana Tag Team Championship.

On April 20, 2014, she won her first championship, beating Manami Katsu for the JWP Junior Championship and Princess of Pro-Wrestling Championship. She made one successful defense against Kaho Kobayashi, before dropping the belt to Rabbit Miu on August 17. On October 5, she competed in the biggest match of her career to that point, challenging Manami Toyota for the Diana World Championship. After a 20-minute match, Sareee was defeated. On December 23, she and Jaguar Yokota won the Diana Tag Team Championship, beating Kaoru and Mima Shimoda. Sareee and Yokota held the titles until February 2015, when Sareee announced she would be going on an indefinite hiatus due to poor health. She continued competing until April, when she and Yokota successfully defended the belts against Command Bolshoi and Eri, after which, she became inactive and the championships were vacated. After two months away, Sareee returned to the ring on June 28 at Jaguar Yokota's 38th Anniversary Show, teaming with Manami Toyota and Kaoru Ito in a loss to Yumiko Hotta, Mima Shimoda and Meiko Tanaka. On September 16, Sareee had a chance to win the Diana Tag Team Championship back with new partner Meiko Tanaka, but the two were unsuccessful and the vacant titles were won by Dash Chisako and Sendai Sachiko. Despite losing, Sareee and Tanaka became a regular team, and on December 25 defeated Kaho Kobayashi and Rina Yamashita to win Pro Wrestling Wave's Young Oh! Oh! Tag Team Tournament. Two days later at Diana's 40th dojo show, she won a one night tournament, beating Mima Shimoda in the final. On May 5, she main evented Diana's Korakuen Hall show, losing to Seadlinnng's Yoshiko in her 5th anniversary match. The following month, she entered Wave's Catch the Wave tournament, but was eliminated in the quarter final by Tsukasa Fujimoto.

Immediately after leaving Seadlinnng, Sareee announced she would return to Diana on September 18, 2017. Sareee returned to Diana on October 20, 2017, losing to Kaoru Ito. During the match, she sustained a clavicle injury, and was expected to miss over a year of competition due to the injury. After just 3 months, Sareee returned to the ring on January 28, 2018, teaming with Ito in a loss to Kyoko Inoue and Manami Katsu. Throughout early 2018, Sareee began her ascent to the main event of Diana, and challenged Kyoko Inoue for the Diana World Championship in the main event of the Diana 7th Anniversary Memorial Show on May 5, 2018.

Despite losing, Sareee immediately demanded a rematch, which Inoue granted and was set up for July. In the rematch on July 22 in Kawasaki, Sareee defeated Kyoko Inoue to win the Diana World Championship for the first time. In her first defence on December 20, Sareee lost the title to Aja Kong. On January 6, 2019, she challenged and lost to Chihiro Hashimoto for the Sendai Girls World Championship. On February 11, she lost to Aja Kong in their rematch. On May 12 in Korakuen Hall, she finally defeated Kong in their third match to become a two time Diana World Champion. Later in the month, she called out Hashimoto to put both of their championships up in a double title match. Hashimoto agreed, and the match took place on June 8, 2019, with Sareee winning and claiming both the Diana World Championship and Sendai Girls World Championship. Sareee made her first successful defense on July 7, beating Dash Chisako in Korakuen Hall. Sareee lost the Sendai Championship on October 13 to Hashimoto, ending her reign at 127 days. On January 4, 2020, Sareee lost her Diana Championship to Ayako Sato, ending her second reign at 237 days. Sareee announced she will leave Diana in February, as she was heading to the United States.

=== Seadlinnng (2017) ===
After six years with Diana, Sareee announced she would leave the promotion and transfer to Seadlinnng on February 1, 2017. Sareee debuted for Sead on March 16, 2017, losing to Yoshiko. After seven months she announced she would leave the promotion in September.

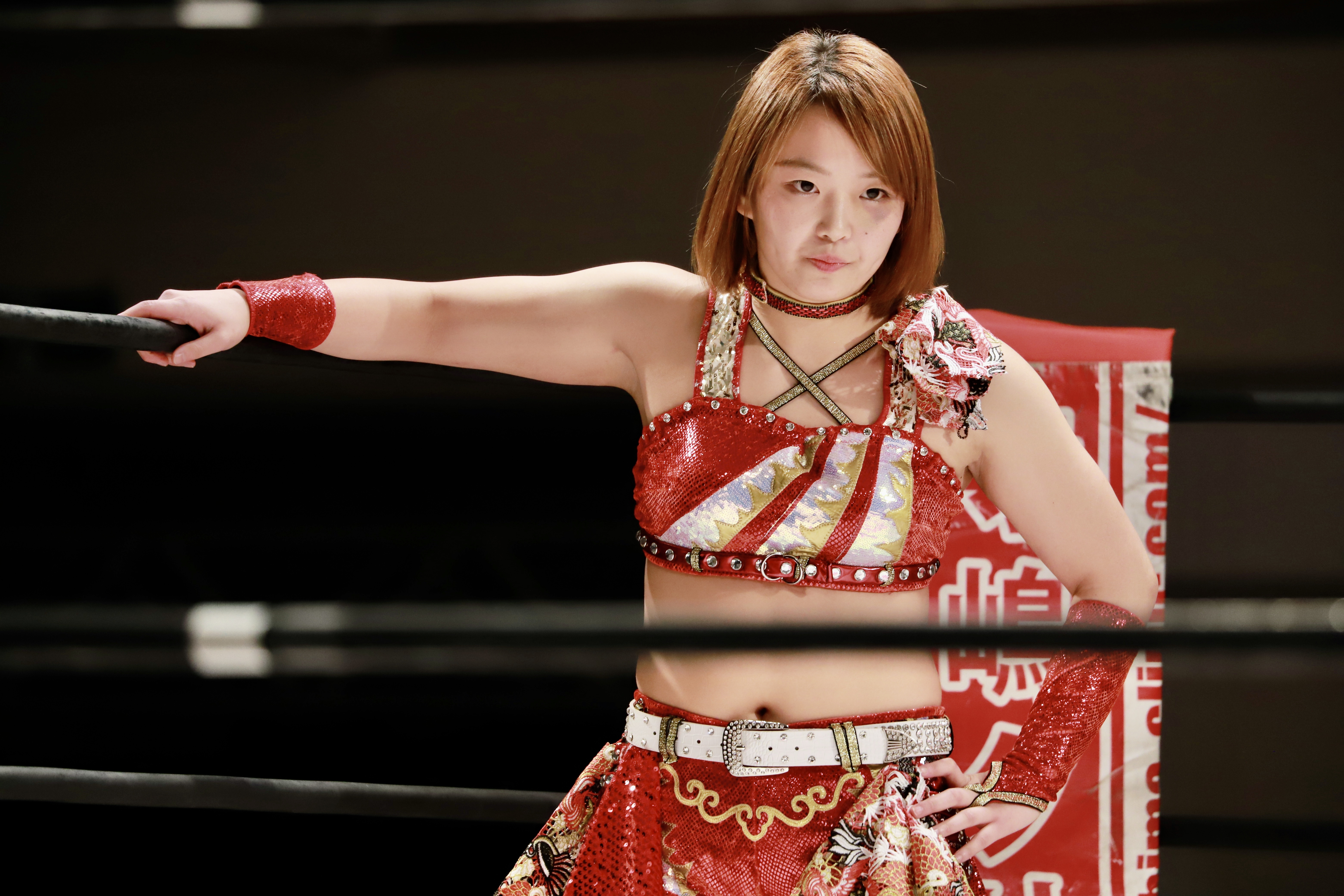
Sareee in 2020

=== WWE (2020–2023) ===
On February 22, 2020, during a Diana show, Sareee confirmed that she had signed with WWE. Her move to the United States was delayed by the COVID-19 pandemic, causing a change in her move schedule. Because of this, WWE allowed her to continue working dates in Japan until she could move to the United States. On August 30, Sareee made her return to the Japanese independent scene with Diana, wrestling Nagisa Nozaki to a ten-minute time limit draw. She briefly held Seadlinnng's Beyond the Sea Tag Team Championship with Yoshiko before losing them to Arisa Nakajima and Nanae Takahashi on January 22, 2021, which was Sarreee's final match on the indies. On the March 17, 2021, episode of NXT, she was given the new ring name Sarray. She made her debut on the April 20 episode of NXT, where she defeated Zoey Stark. On the August 10 episode of NXT, Sarray suffered her first loss against Dakota Kai. She made an appearance on the October 8 episode of 205 Live and defeated Amari Miller.

On the January 18, 2022, episode of NXT, a vignette aired of Sarray sporting pigtails and dressed in a schoolgirl uniform, explaining that 2021 didn't turn out as she hoped it would. She returned to Japan to physically and mentally heal herself, and came across a medallion she got from her grandma, reminding her of where she came from and that she would return to NXT with "new passion and energy". Sarray made her in-ring return on the February 1 episode of NXT, where upon making her entrance she appeared backstage wearing the clothing she wore in her return promotional vignette, then entered the ring area dressed in a new wrestling outfit and a different hair style thanks to her grandmother's medallion with transforming powers, defeating Kayla Inlay. On the February 25 episode of NXT Level Up, she lost in a match against Elektra Lopez. In March, Sarray started a feud with Tiffany Stratton after being attacked by her for rejecting her offer to replace her grandmother's necklace with one that she would give to her; this led them to a match on the March 15 episode of NXT, where Stratton prevented Sarray from transforming and defeated her. Two weeks later, a transformed Sarray distracted Stratton and caused her to lose in a match against Ivy Nile. On the April 19 episode of NXT, Sarray fought Stratton in another losing effort. On the May 10 episode of NXT, Sarray teamed with Andre Chase and defeated the team of Stratton and Grayson Waller in a mixed tag team match. On the June 23 episode of NXT UK, Sarray made her debut on the brand, defeating Nina Samuels. On the July 26 episode of NXT, Sarray returned to the United States and confronted NXT Women's Champion Mandy Rose, leading to a match the following week where she lost. It was Sarray's last match in the WWE.

On March 9, 2023, it was reported Sarray would leave WWE and would be returning to Japan in May. She confirmed her departure on March 13. According to a report, her departure was due to issues with the creative direction of her career. Years later, she later revealed that she did not like her gimmick in NXT.

=== Sareee-ISM (2023–present) ===
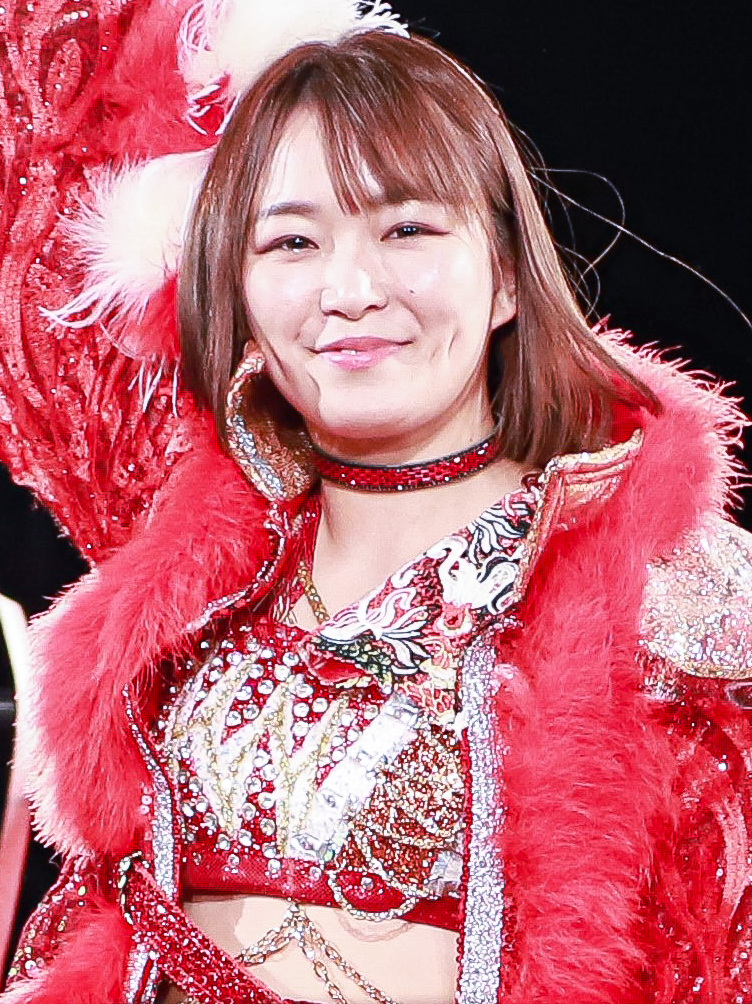
Sareee in 2023

Sareee's in-ring return match was at a freelance show named Sareee-ISM in May 2023, where she was defeated by Chihiro Hashimoto in the main event of the show. In January 2025 at Sareee-ISM Chapter VI, she lost to Meiko Satomura in the show's main event. This would be their final one-on-one match before Satomura's retirement in April.

=== Return to Seadlinnng (2023–2025) ===
In August 2023, Sareee won the Beyond the Sea Single Championship by defeating Arisa Nakajima at the Seadlinnng 8th Anniversary event. Sareee made her first title defense by defeating Ayame Sasamura at Final Battle 2023. On June 12, 2024, at Shinjuku Lighting Up!, Sareee made her second successful title defense of the Beyond the Sea Single Championship against Misa Kagura. On September 24, at Kawasaki Pro Wrestling Matsuri 2024, she defeated Unagi Sayaka to secure her third successful title defense. On December 27, at Final Battle 2024, Sareee defeated Nagisa Nozaki to make her fourth successful title defense. On January 17, 2025, at Shin-Kiba Series 2025 Vol. 1, Sareee dropped the title to Veny, ending her reign at a record-setting 511 days.

=== Sukeban (2023–2026) ===
On October 31, 2023, It was reported Sareee was in negotiations to return to performing in the United States. On November 6, Sukeban announced that Sareee signed a multi-year contract with the company. On December 6 at Sukeban Miami, she won her first match in the promotion, defeating Atomic Banshee, Babyface and Countess Saori in a four-way match. On May 30, 2024, at Sukeban Los Angeles, Sareee (now under the name Sareee Bomb), defeated Maya Mamushi. On October 10 at Sukeban London, Sareee Bomb defeated Commander Nakajima to win the Sukeban World Championship. On July 5, 2025 at Sukeban Los Angeles, Sareee defeated Maya Mamushi, and retained the title.. On 14 November 2025 at Sareee lost the title to Atomic Banshee, ending her reign at 400 days. In 2026, Sareee Bomb quietly left the Sukeban.

=== World Wonder Ring Stardom and New Japan Pro-Wrestling (2024–2025) ===
In March 2024, during night one of the Stardom Cinderella Tournament, Sareee teamed with Hashimoto to defeat Natsupoi and Saori Anou. Later that night, she challenged Mayu Iwatani for the IWGP Women's Championship at All Star Grand Queendom. At the event, Sareee failed to defeat Iwatani for the title. On June 21, 2025, at The Conversion, Sareee defeated Syuri to win the IWGP Women's Championship for the first time. On October 13 at New Japan Pro-Wrestling's King of Pro-Wrestling, Sareee lost the title to Syuri, ending her reign at 114 days.

=== Dream Star Fighting Marigold (2024–2026) ===
In May 2024, Sareee appeared at Dream Star Fighting Marigold's debut event, Marigold Fields Forever, where she participated in a tag-team main event alongside Bozilla against Giulia and Utami Hayashishita in a winning effort. Following the event, it was announced that Saree and Giulia will face each other in a singles match at Summer Destiny. However, it was then announced by Marigold that Giulia had suffered a hand fracture in her match, with her near-term matches cancelled, and putting her Summer Destiny match with Sareee in doubt. Giulia was later cleared, and at the event, Sareee defeated her to become the inaugural Marigold World Champion.

On September 28, during the last day of the inaugural Dream★Star GP, Sareee lost to Bozilla. Frustrated with her loss, Sareee was determined to compete against Bozilla for her World Championship. On October 24, during the Fantastic Adventure event, Sareee defeated Bozilla to retain her title. On December 13, during night two of the Winter Wonderful Fight event, she defeated Nanae Takahashi to secure her second successful title defense. On January 3, 2025, at First Dream, Sareee dropped the title to Utami Hayashishita, ending her reign at 174 days.

=== Ring of Honor / All Elite Wrestling (2025–2026) ===
Sareee made her Ring of Honor (ROH) debut during the October 2, 2025, episode of ROH on Honor Club, where she teamed with Alex Windsor to defeat Billie Starkz and Diamante. The following week, Sareee defeated Windsor to retain the IWGP Women's Championship. In 2026, Sareee was expected to make her debut for ROH's sister promotion All Elite Wrestling (AEW) in the Women's Owen Hart Cup, but was pulled from the tournament due to a neck injury and subsequently replaced by Maya World.

== Other media ==
Fujimura as Sarray is a playable character in video game WWE 2K22 ("The Whole Dam Pack" DLC).

== Championships and accomplishments ==
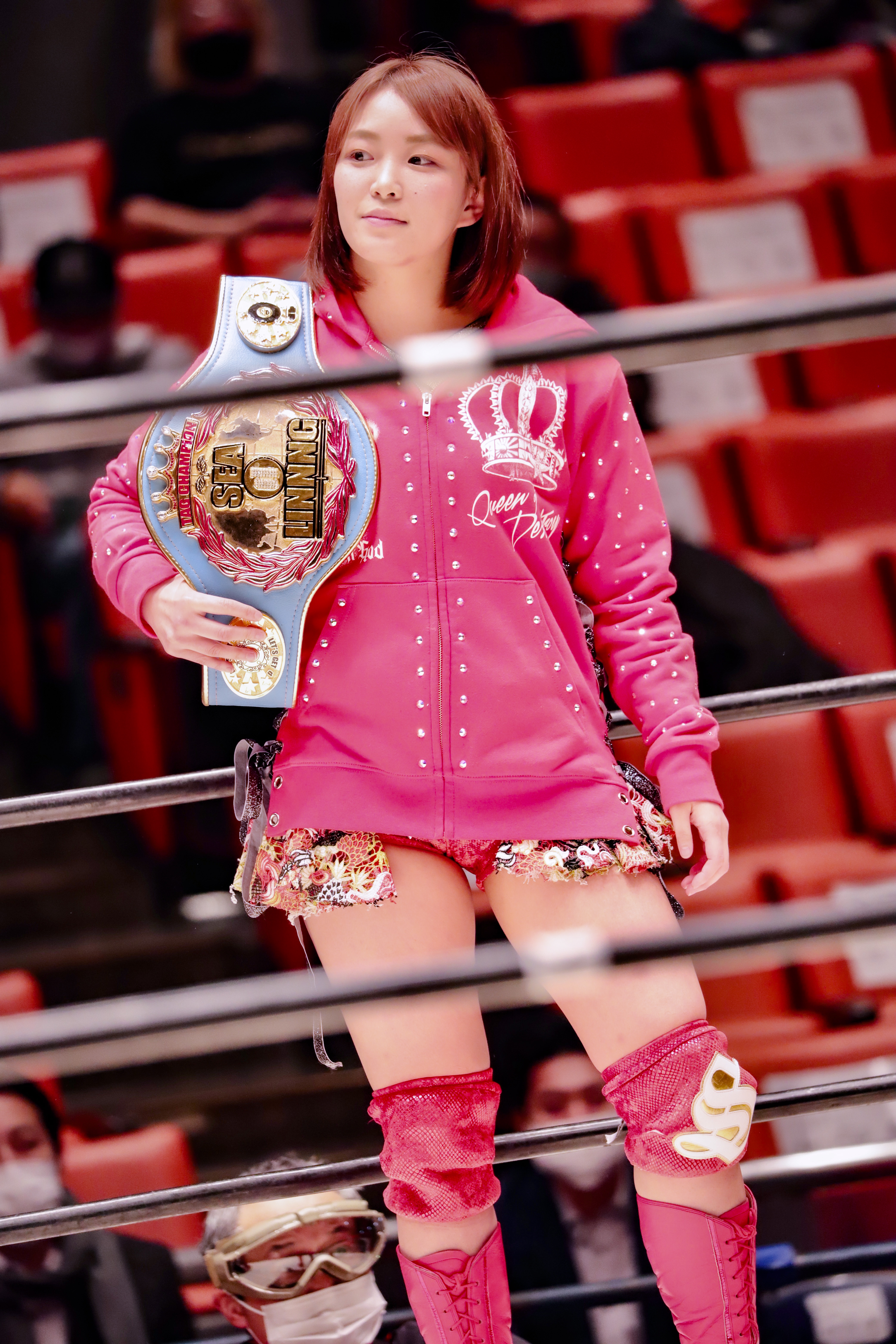
Sareee has held the Seadlinnng Beyond the Sea Tag Team Championship

- Dream Star Fighting Marigold
  - Marigold World Championship (1 time, inaugural)
  - Dream★Star GP Award (1 time)
    - Star League Best Match Award (2024) vs. Nanae Takahashi on September 23
  - Marigold Year-End Award (2 times)
    - Best Match Award (2024) vs. Nanae Takahashi on December 13
    - MVP Award (2024)
- JWP Joshi Puroresu
  - JWP Junior Championship (1 time)
  - Princess of Pro-Wrestling Championship (1 time)
- Marvelous That's Women Pro Wrestling
  - AAAW Tag Team Championship (1 time) – with Takumi Iroha
- New Japan Pro-Wrestling
  - IWGP Women's Championship (1 time)
- Pro Wrestling Illustrated
  - Ranked No. 6 of the top 250 female wrestlers in the PWI Women's 250 in 2024
- Pro Wrestling Wave
  - Young OH! OH! Tag Team Tournament (2015) – with Meiko Tanaka
  - Dual Shock Wave (2020) – with Hibiki
- Seadlinnng
  - Beyond the Sea Single Championship (1 time)
  - Beyond the Sea Tag Team Championship (1 time) – with Yoshiko
- Sendai Girls' Pro Wrestling
  - Sendai Girls World Championship (1 time)
- Sukeban
  - Sukeban World Championship (1 time)
- Tokyo Sports
  - Joshi Puroresu Grand Prize (2024)
  - Fighting Spririt Award (2025)
- World Woman Pro-Wrestling Diana
  - WWWD World Championship (2 times)
  - WWWD Tag Team Championship (1 time) – with Jaguar Yokota
  - One Night Tournament (2015)
- World Wonder Ring Stardom
  - 5★Star GP Award (1 times)
    - Blue Stars Best Match Award (2025) vs. Konami on July 27 in Blue Stars B
- Wrestling Observer Newsletter
  - Women's Wrestling MVP (2024)
