= Kouki Amarei =

Japanese professional wrestler

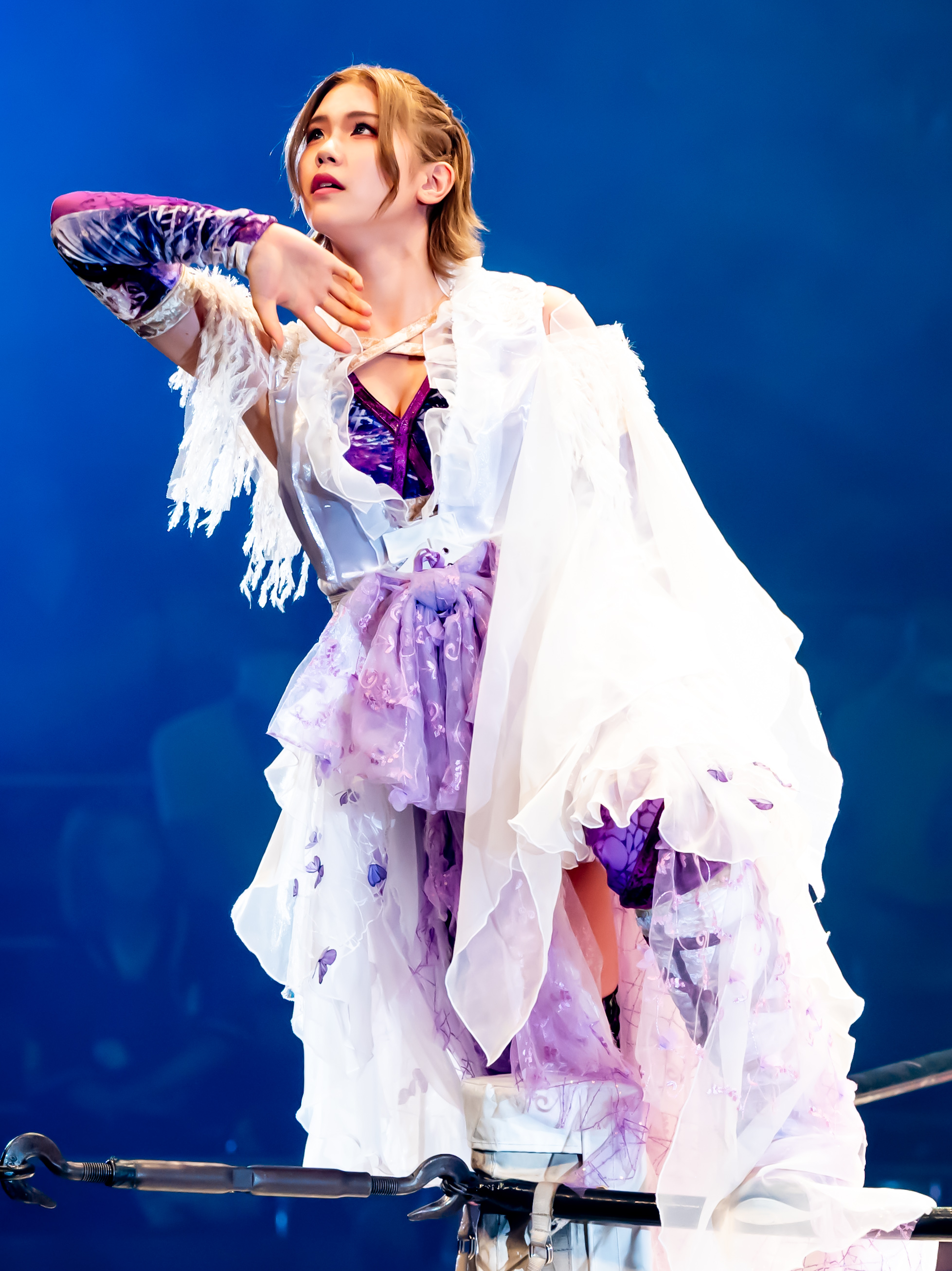
- Amarei in July 2024

Personal information
- Born: January 23, 1997 (age 29) Tokyo, Japan

Professional wrestling career
- Ring name: Kouki Kouki Amarei
- Billed height: 170 cm (5 ft 7 in)
- Billed weight: 63 kg (139 lb)
- Debut: 2022

Kouki Amarei (天麗皇希, Amarei Kōki; born January 23, 1997) is a Japanese professional wrestler currently performing in the Japanese promotion Dream Star Fighting Marigold where she is one-half of the current Marigold Twin Star Champions in her first reign. She is previously known for her short tenure with Actwres girl'Z.

== Early life ==
Amarei has studied classical ballet for 10 years during her childhood, aiming to become a ballerina since she was 5 years old. She gave up on ballet because there were few male partners she could find to match her height. In high school, she joined a music club. After graduation, she briefly attended a music college, but dropped out. After that, she went on to become a street dancer, a cross-dressing idol, and a stage actress, appearing in many productions. In 2021, Amarei was scouted by Actwres girl'Z. She was part of the artistic division of the company before transitioning to the professional wrestling part in early 2022.

== Professional wrestling career ==
=== Actwres girl'Z (2022–2024) ===
Amarei made her professional wrestling debut in Actwres girl'Z on February 13, 2022, at AWG ACTwrestling Hataage, where she teamed up with Wild Bunny in a losing effort against Mii and Sakura Mizushima in tag team competition. She took part in a tournament for the vacant AWG Single Championship in which she defeated Ayano Irie in the first rounds, Misa Matsui in the second ones, then fell short to Miku Aono in the finals from AWG ACTwrestling In Korakuen Hall on March 12, 2023. She wrestled her last match in the promotion on April 6, 2024, at AWG ACTwrestling In Osaka where she teamed up with her "The Royal" tag team partner Natsumi Sumikawa to defeat Miku Aono and Riko Fukunaga.

=== Dream Star Fighting Marigold (2024–present) ===
In April 2024, Amarei was announced as part of the newly created promotion of Dream Star Fighting Marigold. At the inaugural event, the Fields Forever from May 20, she teamed up with Chika Goto to defeat Misa Matsui and Natsumi Showzuki. At Marigold Summer Destiny on July 13, she teamed up again with Amarei, with whom she was already wrestling under the tag name of "tWin toWer" to go into a time-limit draw against Kizuna Tanaka and Victoria Yuzuki. Amarei and Goto competed in the inaugural tournament for the Marigold Twin Star Championship in which they defeated Nanae Takahashi and Nao Ishikawa in the first rounds, then fell short to Miku Aono and Natsumi Showzuki in the second ones.

At Summer Gold Shine on August 19, she unsuccessfully challenged Miku Aono for the Marigold United National Championship. The bout represented the first-ever title defense of any kind in Marigold since its creation. She competed in the "Dream League" Block of the Dream★Star GP where she wrestled against NØRI, Utami Hayashishita, Natsumi Showzuki, Mirai, Chika Goto, Nagisa Nozaki and Victoria Yuzuki.

=== Japanese independent circuit (2024–present) ===
Amarei often competed in the Japanese independent scene as a joshi special talent. In All Japan Pro Wrestling, she made her first appearance on the second night of the AJPW New Year Giant Series 2024 from January 3, where she teamed up with Chika Goto to defeat Miku Aono and Natsuki. On the finals night of the 2024 edition of Pro Wrestling Noah's N-1 Victory, Amarei teamed up with Kizuna Tanaka, Bozilla and Miku Aono in a losing effort against Great Sakuya, Miyuki Takase, Sandra Moone and Takumi Iroha.

== Personal life ==
Amarei identifies as genderless (Note: Japanese: ジェンダーレス, Hepburn: jendāresu), a non-binary identity.

== Championships and accomplishments ==
- Dream Star Fighting Marigold
  - Marigold Twin Star Championship (1 time, current) – with Chika Goto
  - Dream★Star GP Award (2 times)
    - Dream League Best Match Award (2024) vs. Mirai on September 20
    - Outstanding Performance Award (2025)
  - Marigold Year-End Award (1 time)
    - SHINE Award (2024)
- Pro Wrestling Illustrated
  - Ranked No. 136 of the top 250 female wrestlers in the PWI Women's 250 in 2025
- Pro Wrestling Noah
  - GHC Women's Championship (1 time, inaugural)
