= Utami Hayashishita =

Japanese professional wrestler

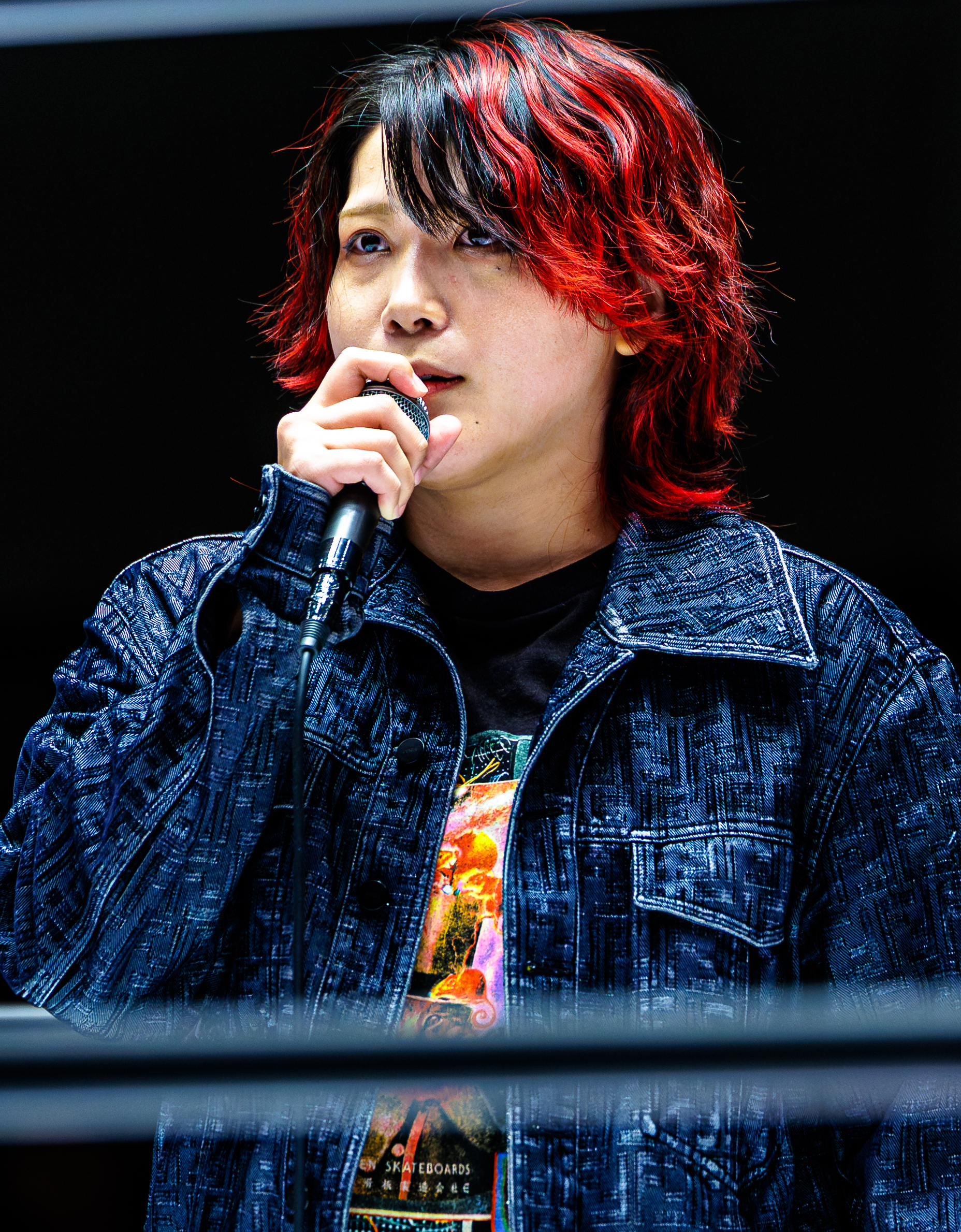
- Hayashishita in May 2026

Personal information
- Born: September 14, 1998 (age 28) Amami, Kagoshima, Japan

Professional wrestling career
- Ring name(s): Red Snake; Utami Hayashishita; Utami Nakano
- Billed height: 1.66 m (5 ft 5 1/2 in)
- Billed weight: 65 kg (143 lb)
- Billed from: Amami, Kagoshima, Japan
- Trained by: Kagetsu; World Wonder Ring Stardom
- Debut: August 12, 2018

Utami Hayashishita (林下詩美, Hayashishita Utami; born September 14, 1998) is a Japanese professional wrestler. She is signed to World Wonder Ring Stardom, where she is a member of Stars and a former World of Stardom Champion.

She began her professional wrestling career in August 2018 with World Wonder Ring Stardom, where she became the leader of the Queen's Quest stable, a former three-time Goddesses of Stardom Champion, as well as Artist of Stardom Champion, Future of Stardom Champion and SWA World Champion. She won the 2020 5Star Grand Prix, the 2018 Goddesses of Stardom Tag League and the 2019 Trios Tag Team Tournament. Hayashishita is also a former one-time Pro-Wrestling: EVE International Champion. She departed Stardom in March 2024 to sign with Dream Star Fighting Marigold that April, where she became a one-time Marigold World Champion. She departed Marigold in May 2026 and returned to Stardom that same month.

A winner of a WON Women’s Wrestling MVP award, a Stardom MVP Award, and Tokyo Sports Women's Wrestling Grand Prize in 2021, she is recognized as one of the most popular wrestlers on the modern joshi professional wrestling scene.

== Early life ==
From 2006 to 2013, Hayashishita was featured in a reality show that documented her 12-person family. Hayashishita reportedly first got interested in professional wrestling during her days in her third year of junior high school after watching Tajiri with her family when he was at WWE. After graduating high school, she would take auditions in the Stardom dojo while also paying school expenses for her sisters by working in a restaurant. Hayashishita practices judo and holds a black belt.

== Professional wrestling career ==
=== World Wonder Ring Stardom (2018–2024) ===
==== Early career and championship reigns (2018–2021) ====
After attending Yoshihiro Tajiri's homecoming show, Hayashishita began to train at World Wonder Ring Stardom in March 2018. On August 12, 2018, Hayashishita made her debut in a match against Jungle Kyona, which ended in a time-limit draw and marked the beginning of a rivalry with Kyona. On August 18, Hayashishita entered the 2018 5Star Grand Prix, in which she lost in the finals to Mayu Iwatani. On August 26, Hayashishita and Momo Watanabe teamed up for the first time to win a four-way tag team match, after which Hayashishita would continue to frequently fight alongside members of Queen's Quest. At Mask Fiesta 2018 on October 28, Hayashishita, under the ring name Red Snake, donned a mask and teamed up with Black Fuzzy Peach, Masked Wan-chan and Mini Iotica to defeat Fancy Maruyama, Natsuki Urabe, Reo Hazuki and Yukari Ishino. On November 4, Hayashishita won the 2018 Goddesses of Stardom Tag League with Momo Watanabe. At Best of Goddesses 2018 on November 23, Hayashishita won her first title when she and Momo Watanabe defeated J.A.N. (Jungle Kyona and Natsuko Tora) to win the Goddesses of Stardom Championship. Afterwards, Hayashishita officially joined Queen's Quest. On December 2, Hayashishita won a four-woman gauntlet match to become the 2018 Rookie of Stardom. At the 2018 Stardom Awards on December 24, Hayashishita won the Outstanding Performance award, and Hayashishita and Momo Watanabe won the Best Tag Team award. Hayashishita was also given the 2018 Newcomer Award by Tokyo Sports.

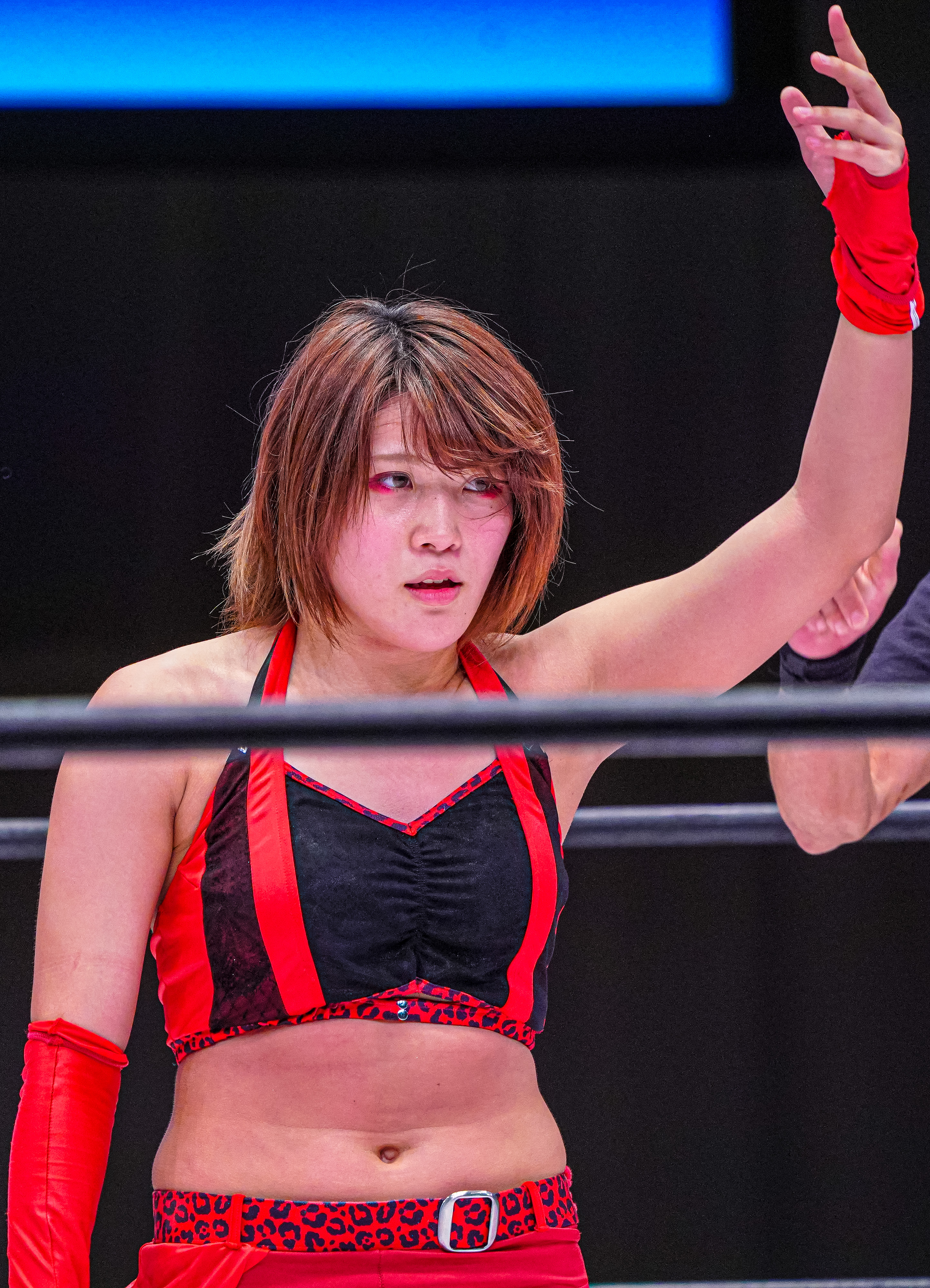
Hayahishita in July 2019

On January 3, 2019, Hayashishita won the Future of Stardom Championship by defeating Starlight Kid. On January 5, Hayashishita, along with fellow Queen's Quest members Bea Priestley and Viper, won the one-day Trios Tag Team Tournament. At Stardom's 8th Anniversary show on January 14, Hayashishita defeated Viper to win the Pro-Wrestling: EVE International Championship and the SWA Undisputed World Women's Championship, making her a quadruple champion. On April 5, Hayashishita participated in Stardom's first event in the United States in New York City, where she unsuccessfully challenged her tag team partner Momo Watanabe for the Wonder of Stardom Championship. Following this match, Hayashishita went on a two month hiatus due to a hand injury. On July 15, Hayashishita and Watanabe lost the Goddesses of Stardom Championship to Tokyo Cyber Squad (Konami and Jungle Kyona), ending their reign at 234 days with six successful title defenses. Hayashishita competed in the 2019 5Star Grand Prix, but exited the tournament early on September 7 after sustaining a finger injury. Hayashishita returned on November 15 where she teamed with Leo Onozaki in a loss to Oedo Tai (Hazuki and Natsuko Tora). On November 23, Hayashishita, Momo Watanabe and AZM won the Artist of Stardom Championship by defeating Oedo Tai (Andras Miyagi, Kagetsu and Natsu Sumire).

At Stardom's 9th Anniversary show on January 19, 2020, Hayashishita unsuccessfully challenged Arisa Hoshiki for the Wonder of Stardom Championship. On January 26, Hayashishita lost the SWA World Championship to Jamie Hayter. On February 8, Hayashishita, Momo Watanabe and AZM lost the Artist of Stardom Championship to Donna del Mondo (Giulia, Maika and Syuri). On February 16, Hayashishita successfully defended the Future of Stardom Championship against Saya Kamitani, then vacated the championship to focus on pursuing the Wonder of Stardom and World of Stardom championships. On March 3, Hayashishita and Momo Watanabe unsuccessfully challenged Oedo Tai (Jamie Hayter and Bea Priestley) for the Goddesses of Stardom Championship. At Cinderella Summer in Tokyo on July 26, Hayashishita and Saya Kamitani won the vacant Goddesses of Stardom Championship. On September 19, Hayashishita won the 2020 5Star Grand Prix after defeating Himeka in the finals. At Sendai Cinderella on November 15, Hayashishita won the World of Stardom Championship by defeating Mayu Iwatani. Hayashishita had her first successful title defense on December 20 at Osaka Dream Cinderella against fellow Queen's Quest member Momo Watanabe. On December 26, Hayashishita and Saya Kamitani lost the Goddesses of Stardom Championship to Konami and Bea Priestley, ending their reign at 153 days.

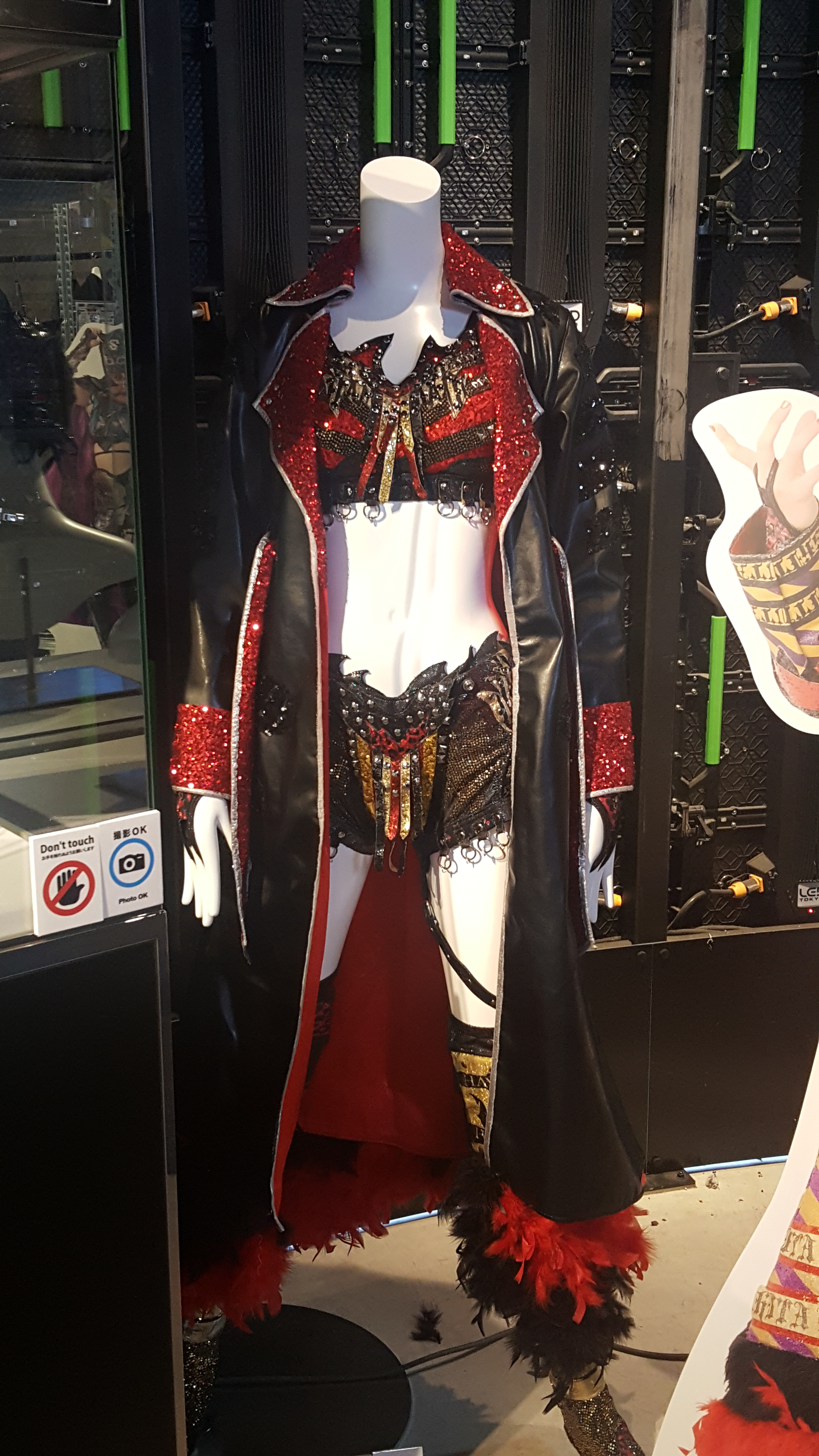
One of Hayashishita's ring gears on display at Stardom's pop-up store in Tokyo in November 2021

At All Star Dream Cinderella on March 3, 2021, she successfully defended the World of Stardom Championship against her Queen's Quest stablemate Saya Kamitani. A month later at Yokohama Dream Cinderella on April 4, Hayashishita successfully defended the World of Stardom Championship against Bea Priestley in the latter's final Stardom match. On the first night of the 2021 Cinderella Tournament on April 10, she defeated Mina Shirakawa in a first-round match. On the second night on May 14, she fell short to Syuri in a second-round match. On the third night on June 12, Hayashishita successfully defended the World of Stardom Championship against Syuri two times after both competitors requested the restart of the match after it went into a 30-minute time-limit draw. This was sanctioned as only one valid defense for Hayashishita. The first match between Hayashishita and Syuri received a 5.5 stars rating from Dave Meltzer, making it the highest-rated match in the history of women's professional wrestling up to that date. At Yokohama Dream Cinderella 2021 in Summer on July 4, Hayashishita successfully defended the World of Stardom Championship against Natsuko Tora via doctor stoppage after Tora suffered a legitimate knee injury during the match. Hayashishita competed in the 2021 5Star Grand Prix between July 31 and September 25. She was placed in the Blue Stars Block, where she failed to reach the finals after scoring a total of 10 points. At Stardom 10th Anniversary Grand Final Osaka Dream Cinderella on October 9, she successfully defended the World of Stardom Championship against Takumi Iroha who competed as a guest from Marvelous That's Women Pro Wrestling. At Kawasaki Super Wars on November 3, Hayashishita defended the World of Stardom Championship against a returning Hazuki. At Tokyo Super Wars on November 27, she defended the title again successfully against Maika. At Stardom Dream Queendom on December 29, Hayashishita lost the World of Stardom Championship to Syuri in a winner-takes-all match also for the SWA World Championship, ending her reign at 409 days.

==== Queen's Quest leadership (2022–2024) ====
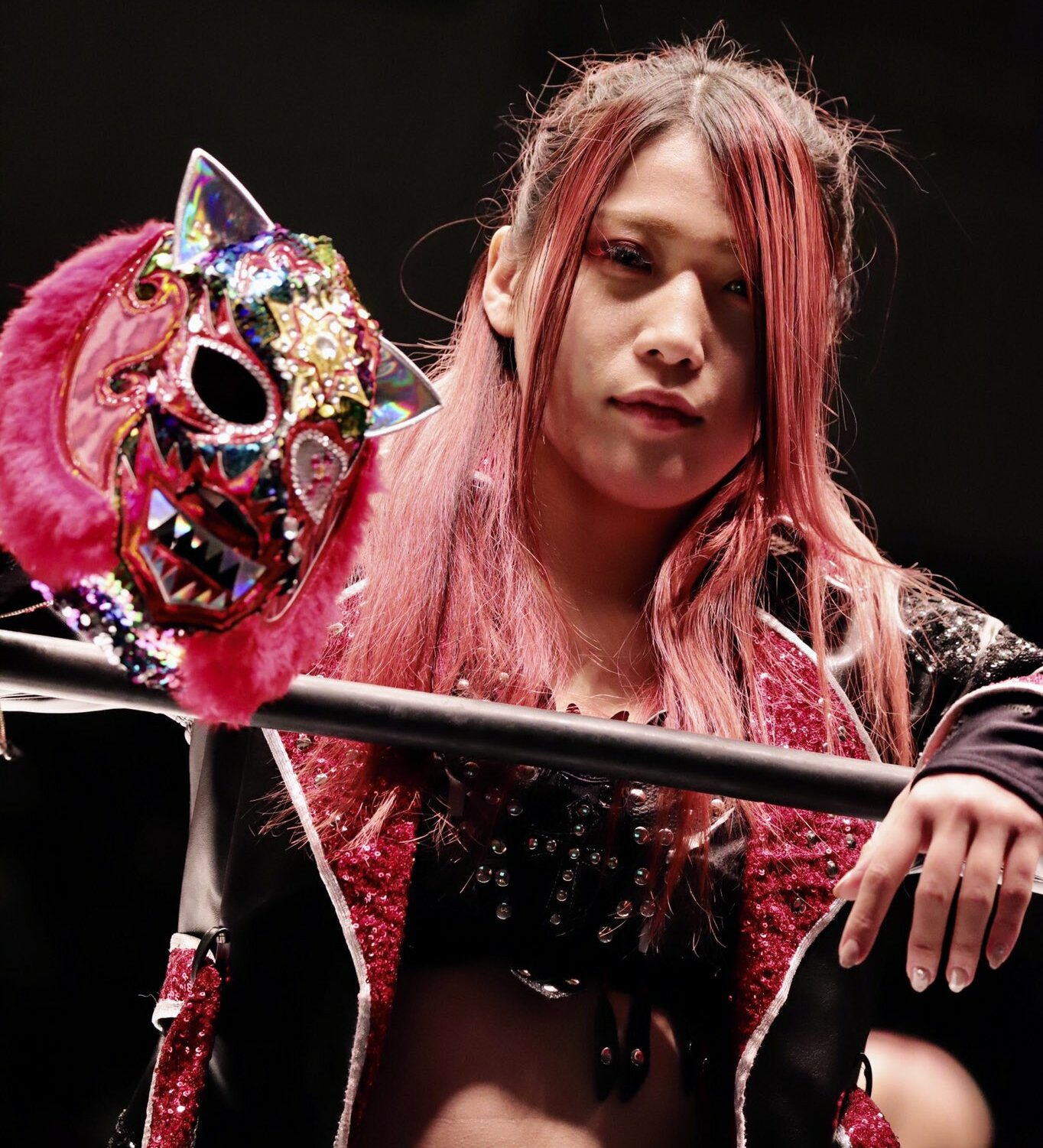
Hayashishita in November 2021.

At Osaka Super Wars on December 18, 2021, Hayashishita teamed up with Queen's Quest stablemates AZM, Saya Kamitani and the unit's captain Momo Watanabe to fight Oedo Tai (Starlight Kid, Saki Kashima, Konami and Ruaka) in an elimination tag team match. In this match, Watanabe betrayed Queen's Quest by attacking AZM with a steel chair to get herself disqualified. Watanabe joined Oedo Tai, leaving Queen's Quest without a leader.

At the 2021 Stardom Awards show on January 3, 2022, Hayashishita, AZM, and Saya Kamitani engaged in a brawl with Oedo Tai after their match against Fukigen Death, Saki Kashima and Ruaka. The three members of Queen's Quest were outnumbered, but they received help from Lady C, who rushed down to the ring to try to save them. After Oedo Tai retreated, Hayashishita offered Lady C a spot in Queen's Quest, to which the Lady C accepted. At Nagoya Supreme Fight on January 29, Hayashishita and AZM fell short to Momo Watanabe and Starlight Kid. At Cinderella Journey on February 23, she teamed up with Lady C in a losing effort against Starlight Kid and Ruaka. At New Blood 1 on March 11, Hayashishita defeated the debuting Miyu Amasaki. Despite the latter's loss, Hayashishita was so impressed by Amasaki's performance that Hayashishita offered her a spot in Queen's Quest, which Amasaki accepted. On the first night of the World Climax 2022 on March 26, Hayashishita unsuccessfully challenged Saya Kamitani for the Wonder of Stardom Championship. Hayashishita participated in the Cinderella Tournament 2022, in which she was eliminated in the first round on April 3 after wrestling Tam Nakano to a time-limit draw.

On May 15, 2022, a five-way match between Hayashishita, Lady C, AZM, Saya Kamitani and Hina took place to determine the new leader of Queen's Quest, to end a nearly six month period without an elected leader. Hayashishita won the match, therefore becoming the fourth leader of Queen's Quest. At Fight in the Top on June 26, Hayashishita, AZM and Saya Kamitani lost to Stars (Mayu Iwatani, Koguma and Hazuki) in one of Stardom's first ever steel cage matches. At Stardom in Showcase vol.2 on September 25, 2022, Hayashishita teamed up with Lady C and Syuri as the Rossy Ogawa Bodyguard Army in a losing effort against Grim Reaper Army (Yuu, Nanae Takahashi and Yuna Manase).

At Mid Summer Champions 2023 on July 2, 2023, Hayashishita announced that she would be taking a break from her Queen's Quest leadership duties to go on an excursion in the United States in order to reevaluate herself. Hayashishita returned on the first night of the 2023 5 Star Grand Prix on July 23. In September, Hayashishita suffered a cervical hernia, which caused her to withdraw from the 5Star Grand Prix and go on a hiatus. Hayashishita made her return on November 28 alongside her AphrOditE teammate, Saya Kamitani, who had also been out due to an injury. At Nagoya Big Winter on December 2, AphrOditE won the vacant Goddesses of Stardom Championship by defeating Divine Kingdom.

On March 21, 2024, Stardom announced that Hayashishita, Giulia, Mai Sakurai, MIRAI and Yuzuki would be leaving the promotion once their contracts expire on March 31, 2024. On March 30, AphroditE lost the Goddesses of Stardom Championship to Crazy Star.

=== Pro-Wrestling: EVE (2019) ===
At Stardom's 8th Anniversary show on January 14, 2019, Hayashishita defeated Viper to win the Pro-Wrestling: EVE International Championship. At EVE Wrestle Queendom 2 on June 30, Hayashishita lost the International Championship to Jamie Hayter in a three-way elimination match, which also involved Nina Samuels, ending her reign at 167 days.

=== New Japan Pro Wrestling (2021) ===
On January 5, 2021, at the second night of New Japan Pro-Wrestling (NJPW)'s Wrestle Kingdom 15, Hayashishita made her first NJPW appearance where she, alongside AZM and Saya Kamitani, defeated Himeka, Maika and Natsupoi in a dark match.

=== United States independent circuit (2023) ===
In July 2023, Hayashishita went on an excursion through the United States independent circuit. At GCW Clean Up Man on July 8, Hayashishita defeated Billie Starkz. On July 9, Hayashishita participated in a match for Jersey Championship Wrestling, in which she defeated Janai Kai. In the final match of her independent circuit excursion, Hayashishita defeated LuFisto at GCW Now and Forever on July 14. Hayashishita made her Ring of Honor (ROH) debut during the July 20, 2023, televised episode, where she defeated Trish Adora.

=== Dream Star Fighting Marigold (2024–2026) ===
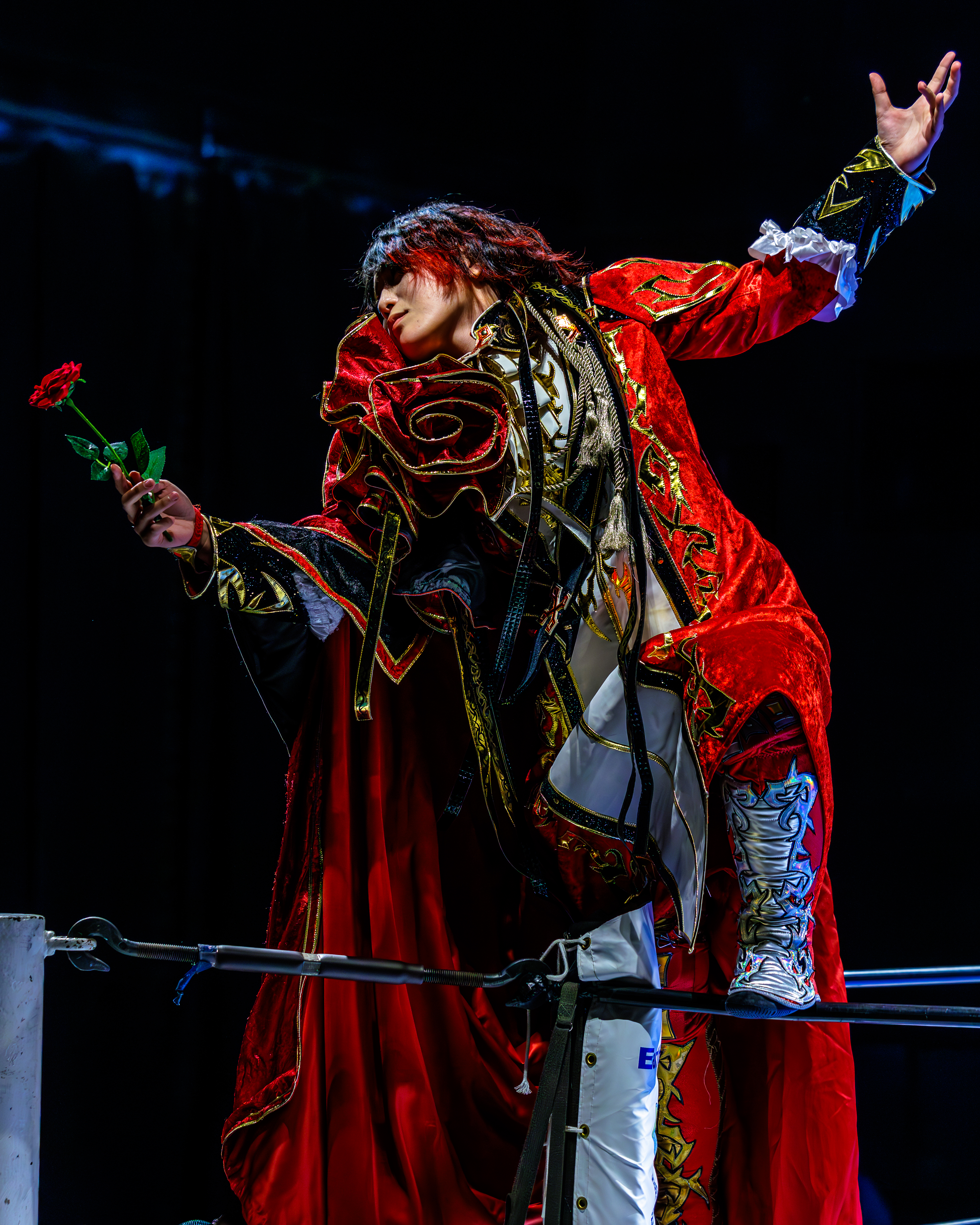
Hayashishita at an Ito Dojo event, Shin-Kiba 1st Ring, May 17th 2026

On April 15, 2024, former Stardom executive producer Rossy Ogawa held a press conference to announce his new promotion Dream Star Fighting Marigold, with Hayashishita being one of the initial roster members. On May 20, 2024, at Marigold's debut event Marigold Fields Forever, Hayashishita main evented the show in a tag-team match alongside Giulia, in a losing effort against Sareee and Bozilla. On July 13, at Summer Destiny, Hayashishita faced WWE's Iyo Sky in a match between former leaders of Stardom's Queen's Quest, in a losing effort.

On September 28, Hayashishita became the inaugural Dream★Star GP winner, after defeating Mai Sakurai in the finals. On January 3, 2025, at First Dream, Hayashishita defeated Sareee to win the Marigold World Championship. Hayashishita held the championship for 296 days, making successful defenses against Tank, Bozilla, MIRAI and GHC Women's Champion Takumi Iroha. On October 26, 2025, Hayashishita lost the Marigold World Championship to Dream★Star GP winner Miku Aono at Grand Destiny.

On April 25, 2026, Hayashishita unsuccessfully challenged Aono for the Marigold World Championship. After the match, Hayashishita announced that she would be leaving Marigold after Shine Forever on May 23. At Shine Forever, Hayashishita wrestled her final match for Marigold, teaming with Maddy Morgan and Takumi Iroha in a losing effort against Mai Sakurai, Miku Aono and MIRAI.

=== Return to World Wonder Ring Stardom (2026–present) ===
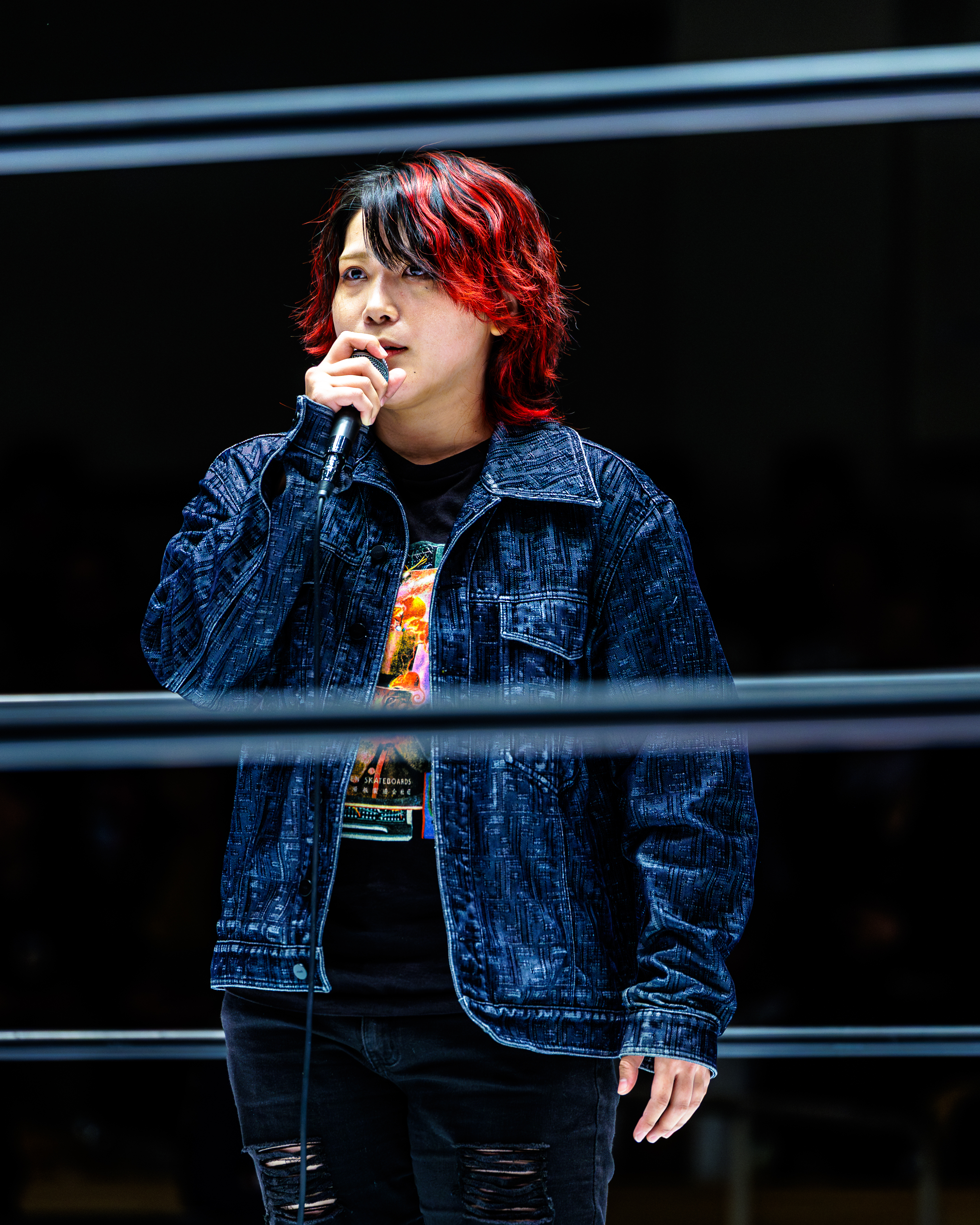
Hayashishita making her return to Stardom in May 2026

Hayashishita made her surprise return to World Wonder Ring Stardom on May 26, 2026, at Stardom Nighter in Korakuen, confronting her former tag team partner and Queen's Quest stablemate Saya Kamitani. After her return, Stardom president Taro Okada claimed that Hayashishita was not signed to the promotion but would join the active roster as a freelancer. On May 30, Hayashishita wrestled her first Stardom match in over two years, where she defeated Akira Kurogane. On June 20 at The Conversion, Hayashishita teamed with Neo Genesis members AZM, Miyu Amasaki, and Starlight Kid to defeat Kamitani and her H.A.T.E. stablemates Bea Priestley, Konami, and Momo Watanabe. Two days later, Hayashishita would officially re-sign with Stardom.

== Other media ==
=== Filmography ===
==== Television ====
- 2006–2013: Tsuukai! Big Daddy (痛快!ビッグダディ)

== Championships and accomplishments ==
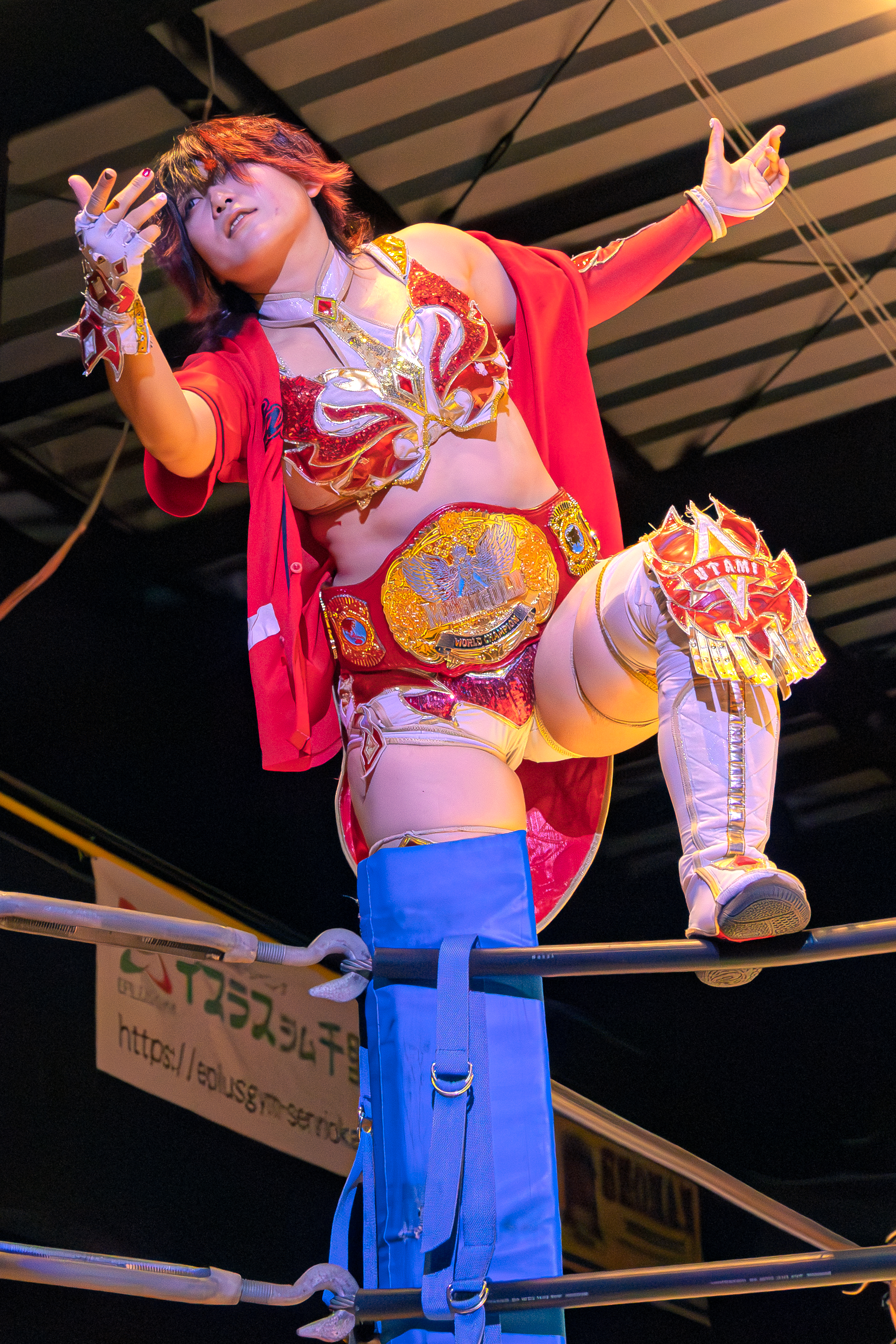
Hayashishita is a one-time Marigold World Champion

- Dream Star Fighting Marigold
  - Marigold World Championship (1 time)
  - Dream★Star GP (2024)
  - Marigold Year-End Award (2 times)
    - Outstanding Performance Award (2024)
    - Fighting Spirit Award (2025)
- ESPN
  - Ranked No. 15 of the 30 best Pro Wrestlers Under 30 in 2023
- Pro-Wrestling: EVE
  - Pro-Wrestling: EVE International Championship (1 time)
- Pro Wrestling Illustrated
  - Ranked No. 2 of the top 150 female wrestlers in the PWI Women's 150 in 2021
  - Ranked No. 20 of the top 50 tag teams in the PWI Tag Team 50 in 2020 with AZM, Momo Watanabe and Saya Kamitani as Queen's Quest
- Tokyo Sports
  - Newcomer Award (2018)
  - Women's Wrestling Grand Prize (2021)
- World Wonder Ring Stardom
  - Artist of Stardom Championship (1 time) – with AZM and Momo Watanabe
  - Future of Stardom Championship (1 time)
  - Goddesses of Stardom Championship (3 times) – with Momo Watanabe (1) and Saya Kamitani (2)
  - SWA World Championship (1 time)
  - World of Stardom Championship (1 time)
  - 5★Star GP (2020)
  - Goddesses of Stardom Tag League (2018) – with Momo Watanabe
  - Stardom Rookie of the Year (2018)
  - Trios Tag Team Tournament (2019) – with Bea Priestley and Viper
  - 5★Star GP Awards
    - Blue Stars Best Match Award (2020) vs. Syuri
  - Year-End Awards
    - Best Match Award (2020) vs. Mayu Iwatani on November 15
    - Best Tag Team Award
      - (2018) – with Momo Watanabe
      - (2020) – with Saya Kamitani
    - MVP Award (2021)
    - Outstanding Performance Award (2018)
    - Best Unit Award (2023) – as a part of Queen's Quest
- Wrestling Observer Newsletter Awards
  - Woman’s Wrestling MVP (2021)

Achievements
Preceded by Inaugural	Dream Star Grand Prix winner 2024	Succeeded by Miku Aono
Preceded by Hana Kimura	5Star Grand Prix winner 2020	Succeeded by Syuri
Preceded by Bea Priestley; Kelly Klein	Goddesses of Stardom Tag League winner 2018; With: Momo Watanabe	Succeeded by Arisa Hoshiki; Tam Nakano
