= Kizuna Tanaka =

Japanese professional wrestler

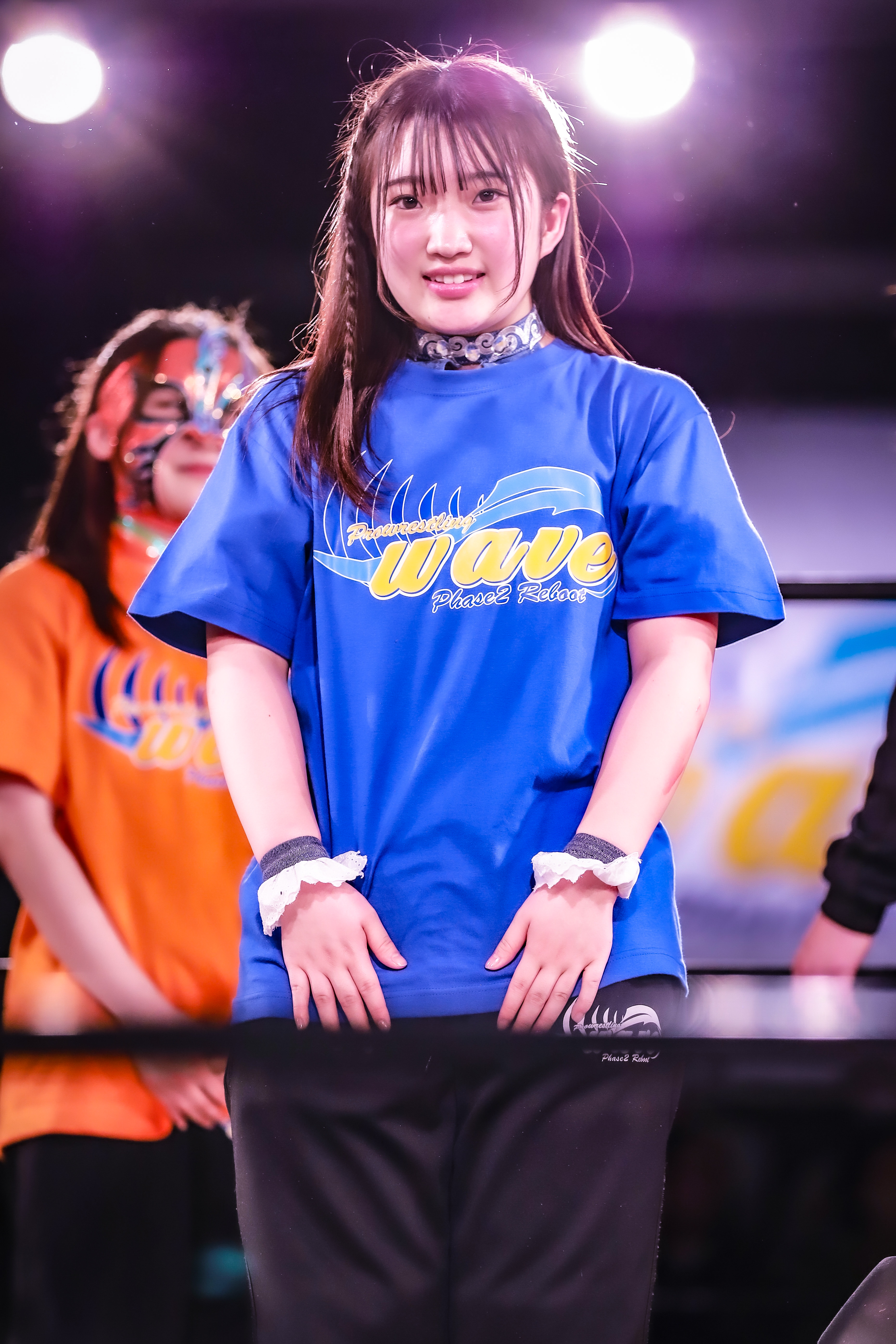
- Tanaka in April 2023

Personal information
- Born: December 3, 2004 (age 21) Zushi, Japan
- Family: Minoru Tanaka (father); Yumi Fukawa (mother)

Professional wrestling career
- Ring name: Kizuna Tanaka
- Billed height: 152 cm (5 ft 0 in)
- Billed weight: 50 kg (110 lb)
- Trained by: Kaoru Ito; Megumi Yabushita; Minoru Tanaka
- Debut: April 2, 2023

Kizuna Tanaka (田中希沙, Tanaka Kizuna) is a Japanese professional wrestler currently working for the Japanese professional wrestling promotion Dream Star Fighting Marigold.

== Professional wrestling career ==
=== Pro Wrestling Wave (2023–2024) ===
Tanaka made her professional wrestling debut in Pro Wrestling Wave at WAVE PHASE 2 Reboot 4th ~ NAMI 1 on April 2, 2023, where she fell short to Honoka in singles competition. She continued to regularly perform in the company and began competing in various signature events. As for the Catch the Wave, she made her debut at the 2023 edition where she placed herself in the "Young Block" in which she scored one point after going against Chie Ozora, Yura Suzuki, Himiko and Honoka. Although failing to qualify to the knock-out phases due to her point shortage, alongside Kohaku and Itsuki Aoki, Tanaka won a "second chance" battle royal to get resurrected in the tournament, bout which featured most of the group stage competitors from all blocks such as Ayame Sasamura, Cherry, Hiragi Kurumi, Miyuki Takase, Kaori Yoneyama and many others. Tanaka fell short to Saki in the first rounds of the winner tournament. As for the Dual Shock Wave, she made her first appearance at the 2023 edition where she teamed up with ChiChi and unsuccessfully challenged Risa Sera and Saki in the second rounds. Tanaka won her first title, the Wave Tag Team Championship by teaming up with Honoka and defeating Risa Sera and Saki at WAVE Carnival Wave ~ Christmas Deluxe on December 24, 2023.

=== Independent circuit (2023–2024) ===
Tanaka has competed for a multitude of promotions on the Japanese independent scene as a Wave talent. At PURE-J PURE-SLAM DUNK Vol. 2, an event promoted by Pure-J on September 23, 2023, Tanaka unsuccessfully faced Chie Ozora for the vacant Princess of Pro-Wrestling Championship.

=== World Wonder Ring Stardom (2023) ===
Tanaka began competing in the New Blood sub-brand created for rookies of World Wonder Ring Stardom. At New Blood 10, on August 18, 2023, she teamed up with Honoka and Hanako to defeat God's Eye (Ami Sourei, Nanami) and Miran. At New Blood 11 on September 28, 2023, Tanaka fell short to Hina and Hanako in a three-way match.

=== Dream Star Fighting Marigold (2024–present) ===
On July 12, 2024, it was confirmed that Tanaka has joined Dream Star Fighting Marigold. On July 13, at Summer Destiny, Tanaka had her first match at Marigold where she teamed with Victoria Yuzuki to challenge Chika Goto and Kouki Amarei in a match that ended with a time-limit draw. On July 21, Tanaka and Yuzuki entered a tournament to crown the inaugural Marigold Twin Star Champions, however, were eliminated at the first round by Miku Aono and Natsumi Showzuki.

== Personal life ==
Tanaka is the daughter of fellow professional wrestlers Minoru Tanaka and Yumi Fukawa. She also has a younger brother.

== Championships and accomplishments ==
- Pro Wrestling Wave
  - Wave Tag Team Championship (1 time) – with Honoka
