= Stardom Yokohama Cinderella 2020 =

2020 World Wonder Ring Stardom event

- Promotional poster featuring various Stardom wrestlers
- Promotion: World Wonder Ring Stardom
- Date: October 3, 2020
- City: Yokohama, Japan
- Venue: Yokohama Budokan
- Attendance: 1,007

Event chronology
← Previous; Cinderella Summer In Tokyo	Next → Sendai Cinderella 2020

Stardom Yokohama Cinderella 2020 (スターダム大阪ドリームシンデレラ2020, Sutādamu Ōsaka dorīmushinderera 2020) was a professional wrestling event promoted by World Wonder Ring Stardom. It took place on October 3, 2020, in Yokohama, Japan, at the Yokohama Budokan, with limited attendance due in part to the ongoing COVID-19 pandemic at the time.

== Storylines ==
The show featured eight professional wrestling matches that resulted from scripted storylines where wrestlers portrayed villains, heroes, or less distinguishable characters in the scripted events that built tension and culminated in a wrestling match or series of matches.

=== Event ===
The second match presented Mina Shirakawa as the first mystery debutant of the night, coming from Tokyo Joshi Pro Wrestling, who picked up a victory against Hanan. The fourth match had Death Yama-san facing the second mystery opponent of the show, who was later revealed to be a returning Natsumi Maki, who started competing as Natsupoi following her departure from TJPW. After her victory against Yama-san, she joined Giulia's unit of Donna Del Mondo. The sixth match featured Tokyo Cyber Squad's disbanding after Jungle Kyona and Konami fell short to Oedo Tai's Natsuko Tora and Saki Kashima. Kyona, Rina, Ruaka, and Death Yama-san received invitations to join the Stars stable led by Mayu Iwatani, which the latter accepted. Only Konami left for Oedo Tai. The disbanding of TCS (often shortened from Tokyo Cyber Sqyad) had been done to mourn the late ex-leader of the unit, Hana Kimura.

The main event of the show featured Mayu Iwatani battling Syuri for the World of Stardom Championship, a match which ended with Iwatani's victory, marking her fourth successful title defense in a row.

== Results ==
No.	Results	Stipulations	Times
1	AZM (c) defeated Starlight Kid	Singles match for the High Speed Championship	11:27
2	Mina Shirakawa defeated Hanan	Singles match	5:07
3	Riho and Saya Iida defeated Natsu Sumire and Yuna Manase	Tag team match	8:39
4	Natsupoi defeated Death Yama-san	Singles match	4:52
5	Bea Priestley defeated Momo Watanabe	Singles match for the vacant SWA World Championship	10:52
6	Oedo Tai (Natsuko Tora and Saki Kashima) defeated Tokyo Cyber Squad (Jungle Kyona and Konami)	Losing unit must disband match	13:07
7	AphrOditE (Saya Kamitani and Utami Hayashishita) (c) defeated MaiHime (Maika and Himeka)	Tag team match for the Goddesses of Stardom Championship	22:33
8	Giulia (c) defeated Tam Nakano	Singles match for the Wonder of Stardom Championship	17:25
9	Mayu Iwatani (c) defeated Syuri	Singles match for the World of Stardom Championship	28:58
(c) / – the champion(s) heading into the match
