= Stardom Sendai Cinderella 2020 =

2020 World Wonder Ring Stardom event

- Promotional poster featuring various superstars
- Promotion: World Wonder Ring Stardom
- Date: November 15, 2020
- City: Sendai, Japan
- Venue: Sendai Sun Plaza
- Attendance: 508

Event chronology
← Previous; Stardom Yokohama Cinderella 2020	Next → Osaka Dream Cinderella 2020

Stardom Sendai Cinderella 2020 (スターダム仙台シンデレラ2020, Sutādamu Sendai Shinderera 2020) was a professional wrestling event promoted by World Wonder Ring Stardom. It took place on November 15, 2020 in Sendai, Japan, at the Sendai Sun Plaza with a limited attendance due in part to the ongoing COVID-19 pandemic at the time.

Eight matches were contested at the event, including one on the pre-show, and five of Stardom's seven championships were on the line. The main event saw Utami Hayashishita defeat Mayu Iwatani to win the World of Stardom Championship. In other prominent matches, Giulia successfully retained the Wonder of Stardom Championship against Konami, and Syuri defeated Bea Priestley to win the SWA World Championship.

== Storylines ==
The show featured eight professional wrestling matches that resulted from scripted storylines, where wrestlers portrayed villains, heroes, or less distinguishable characters in the scripted events that built tension and culminated in a wrestling match or series of matches.

=== Event ===
The first match of the night saw Donna Del Mondo's Maika retaining the Future of Stardom Championship over Stars' Saya Iida, where she scored her second defense in a row. In the next match, Starlight Kid came out victorious from a five-way confrontation against Hina, Saya Kamitani and Stars stablemate Hanan. Next, the Stars sub-unit of Cosmic Angels picked up a win over Natsuko Tora, Rina and Saki Kashima. The fourth match saw AZM defending her High Speed Championship against Gokigen death, securing her second defense in a row. The fifth match had Queen's Quest leader Momo Watanabe picking up a victory over the 2020 5Star GP runner up Himeka. Next, Syuri defeated Bea Priestley to win the SWA World Championship. The semi main-event portraited Giulia defeating Konami to retain the Wonder of Stardom Championship for the third time in a row.

The main event showed the 2020 5Star Grand Prix Tournament winner Utami Hayashishita (who was also one half of the Goddesses of Stardom Champions at that time) cash in her opportunity and successfully capturing the World of Stardom Championship from Mayu Iwatani. After the match concluded, she received a challenge from her stablemate Momo Watanabe. Giulia and Syuri also shook hands for a winner takes all match for both Wonder and SWA World titles.

== Results ==
No.	Results	Stipulations	Times
1^{P}	Maika (c) defeated Saya Iida	Singles match for the Future of Stardom Championship	8:09
2	Starlight Kid defeated Hanan, Hina, Riho and Saya Kamitani	Five-way match	7:06
3	Cosmic Angels (Mina Shirakawa, Tam Nakano and Unagi Sayaka) defeated Oedo Tai (Natsuko Tora, Rina and Saki Kashima)	Six-woman tag team match	10:58
4	AZM (c) defeated Gokigen Death	Singles match for the High Speed Championship	3:20
5	Momo Watanabe defeated Himeka	Singles match	11:01
6	Syuri defeated Bea Priestley (c)	Singles match for the SWA World Championship	11:31
7	Giulia (c) defeated Konami	Singles match for the Wonder of Stardom Championship	20:43
8	Utami Hayashishita defeated Mayu Iwatani (c)	Singles match for the World of Stardom Championship	24:44
(c) / – the champion(s) heading into the match; P / – the match was broadcast on the pre-show
