= Stardom Dream Queendom 2024 =

2024 World Wonder Ring Stardom event

- Promotional poster of the event featuring Tam Nakano and Saya Kamitani
- Promotion: World Wonder Ring Stardom
- Date: December 29, 2024
- City: Tokyo, Japan
- Venue: Ryōgoku Kokugikan
- Attendance: 4,023

Event chronology
← Previous; New Blood 17	Next → New Year Dream

Dream Queendom chronology
← Previous; 2023	Next → 2025

Stardom Dream Queendom 2024 (スターダム ドリームクイーンダム 2024, Sutādamu dorīmukuīndamu 2024) was a professional wrestling event promoted by World Wonder Ring Stardom. It was the fourth annual Stardom Dream Queendom and took place on December 29, 2024, in Tokyo, Japan, at the Ryōgoku Kokugikan. It was the last pay-per-view organized by Stardom in 2024.

Ten matches were contested at the event, including three on the pre-show, and three of Stardom's ten championships were on the line. The main event saw Saya Kamitani defeat Tam Nakano to win the World of Stardom Championship. In another prominent match, Starlight Kid defeated Natsupoi to win the Wonder of Stardom Championship.

== Production ==
=== Background ===
Stardom Dream Queendom is an annual professional wrestling event promoted by the Japanese professional wrestling promotion World Wonder Ring Stardom. Since its inception in 2021, it has taken place on December 29, at Ryōgoku Kokugikan in Tokyo, Japan and marks last pay-per-view of the year hosted by the promotion. The inaugural Dream Queendom took place in 2021. The second event took place in 2022, thus establishing Stardom Dream Queendom as an annual event.

On July 3, 2024, Stardom's parent company New Japan Pro-Wrestling (NJPW) announced that the Dream Queendom 2024 would take place on December 29, 2024.

=== Storylines ===
The show featured several professional wrestling matches that result from scripted storylines, where wrestlers portray villains, heroes, or less distinguishable characters in the scripted events that build tension and culminate in a wrestling match or series of matches.

=== Event ===
The event started with three preshow matches broadcast live on Stardom's YouTube channel. In the first one, Yuna Mizumori and Aya Sakura picked up a victory over Chi Chi and Matoi Hamabe in tag team action. In the second bout, Ranna Yagami wrestled Sayaka Kurara into a time-limit draw, and in the third bout, 2024 Goddesses of Stardom Tag League winners Hanan and Saya Iida defeated Momo Watanabe and Thekla to win the Goddesses of Stardom Championship, ending the latter team's reign at 159 days and one defense.

In the first main card bout, Empress Nexus Venus' Mina Shirakawa, Hanako, Waka Tsukiyama and Rian defeated God's Eye (Saki Kashima, Lady C, Hina and Tomoka Inaba) and H.A.T.E. (Rina, Azusa Inaba, Ruaka and Fukigen Death) in three-way tag team competition. Next up, AZM, Mei Seira, Suzu Suzuki and Miyu Amasaki outmatched (Mayu Iwatani, Hazuki, Koguma and Momo Kohgo in eight-woman tag team competition. The sixth bout saw Saori Anou picking up a victory over Sendai Girls' Pro Wrestling's Mika Iwata in singles competition. In the seventh bout, Syuri defeated Konami via disqualification after the intervention of H.A.T.E. members on the behalf of Konami. Gleat's Kiyoka Kotatsu (formerly known as Maya Fukuda) made her debut by helping Syuri fight off the H.A.T.E. members as she declared that aims to improve her skills under the latter's guidance. In the eighth match, Natsuko Tora defeated Maika in a No Disqualification match which turned into a hardcore bout due to Tora bringing various deathmatch items to the ring. In the semi main event, Starlight Kid defeated Natsupoi to win the Wonder of Stardom Championship, ending the latter's reign at 155 days and two defenses.

In the main event, Saya Kamitani defeated Tam Nakano to win the World of Stardom Championship, ending the latter's reign at 120 days and two defenses.

== Results ==
No.	Results	Stipulations	Times
1^{P}	Cosmic Angels (Yuna Mizumori and Aya Sakura) defeated Chi Chi and Matoi Hamabe by pinfall	Tag team match	10:11
2^{P}	Ranna Yagami vs. Sayaka Kurara ended in a time-limit draw	Singles match	15:00
3^{P}	wing★gori (Hanan and Saya Iida) defeated H.A.T.E. Supreme (Momo Watanabe and Thekla) (c) by pinfall	Tag team match for the Goddesses of Stardom Championship	18:05
4	Empress Nexus Venus (Mina Shirakawa, Hanako, Waka Tsukiyama and Rian) defeated God's Eye (Saki Kashima, Lady C, Hina and Tomoka Inaba) and H.A.T.E. (Rina, Azusa Inaba, Ruaka and Fukigen Death) by pinfall	Three-way tag team match	7:04
5	Neo Genesis (AZM, Mei Seira, Suzu Suzuki and Miyu Amasaki) defeated Stars (Mayu Iwatani, Hazuki, Koguma and Momo Kohgo) by pinfall	Eight-woman tag team match	10:19
6	Saori Anou defeated Mika Iwata by pinfall	Singles match	15:30
7	Syuri defeated Konami by disqualification	Submission match	0:33
8	Natsuko Tora defeated Maika by pinfall	No Disqualification match	18:31
9	Starlight Kid defeated Natsupoi (c) by pinfall	Singles match for the Wonder of Stardom Championship	23:15
10	Saya Kamitani defeated Tam Nakano (c) by pinfall	Singles match for the World of Stardom Championship	21:29
(c) / – the champion(s) heading into the match; P / – the match was broadcast on the pre-show
