= Stardom Super Wars =

2021 World Wonder Ring Stardom event

- Promotional poster featuring various Stardom wrestlers for Kawasaki Super Wars
- Promotion: World Wonder Ring Stardom
- Date: November 3–December 18, 2021
- City: Kawasaki, Japan; Tokyo, Japan; Osaka, Japan
- Venue: Kawasaki City Todoroki Arena; Yoyogi National Gymnasium; Osaka Prefectural Gymnasium
- Attendance: Highest: Osaka Super Wars (1,222)

Event chronology
← Previous; 10th Anniversary Grand Final Osaka Dream Cinderella	Next → Dream Queendom

Stardom Super Wars (スターダムスーパーウォーズ, Sutādamusūpāu~ōzu) was a trilogy of professional wrestling events promoted by the Japanese professional wrestling promotion World Wonder Ring Stardom. They took place beginning with November 3, 2021 and culminated on December 18, 2021, with a limited attendance for each event due in part to the ongoing COVID-19 pandemic at the time.

== Storylines ==
The making of various of the first main card's matches relate to previous events from Stardom 10th Anniversary Grand Final Osaka Dream Cinderella pay-per-view which took place on October 9, 2021. Moments after winning the Future of Stardom Championship from Unagi Sayaka with help from Oedo Tai stablemate Rina who intervened in the match, Ruaka received a title challenge from Lady C. Syuri nominated AZM as the next challenger for the SWA World Championship, Unagi Sayaka challenged Tam Nakano for the Wonder of Stardom Championship and Hazuki announced she will form a tag team with Koguma in the 2021 edition of the Goddesses of Stardom Tag League.

After Hayashishita successfully defended her World of Stardom Championship against Takumi Iroha in the main event, Hazuki and Maika came to the ring to challenge her for a title match. Syuri also stepped up to remind the latter two that she is the rightful challenger for the red belt. It remained for Hazuki to challenge Hayashishita on November 3.

== Kawasaki Super Wars ==
Kawasaki Super Wars
- Promotion: World Wonder Ring Stardom
- Date: November 3, 2021
- City: Kawasaki, Japan
- Venue: Kawasaki City Todoroki Arena
- Attendance: 906

The Kawasaki Super Wars was the first part of the Stardom Super Wars Trilogy of events promoted by World Wonder Ring Stardom which took place on November 3, 2021. The preshow matches were broadcast on Stardom's YouTube channel.

=== Event ===
The show featured nine professional wrestling matches that resulted from scripted storylines, where wrestlers portrayed villains, heroes, or less distinguishable characters in the scripted events that built tension and culminated in a wrestling match or series of matches.

After Mai Sakurai clearly pinned Waka Tsukiyama to win the match, a mysterious masked silhouette walked down to the ring and attacked both. Following her first successful defense of the Future of Stardom Championship against Lady C, Ruaka received a title challenge from both Waka Tsukiyama and Mai Sakurai which she accepted. Konami was initially scheduled to face Saya Kamitani, Mina Shirakawa and Maika in a four-way match but was later pulled out of the bout due to not being yet cleared to compete after being hospitalized with food poisoning.

Koguma issued a challenge for Starlight Kid's High Speed Championship, Himeka stepped up for Donna Del Mondo stablemate Syuri's SWA World Championship and World of Stardom Championship challenge rights certificate, once again a Cosmic Angels member Mina Shirakawa challenged Tam Nakano for the Wonder of Stardom Championship and finally Utami Hayashishita received the request from Maika to a match for the "red belt".

=== Results ===
No.	Results	Stipulations	Times
1^{P}	Mai Sakurai defeated Waka Tsukiyama	Singles match Had Sakurai lost, she must have left the Cosmic Angels unit.	6:23
2^{P}	Ruaka (c) defeated Lady C	Singles match for the Future of Stardom Championship	4:42
3	I love HigashiSpo! (Saki Kashima and Fukigen Death) defeated Water & Oil (Hanan and Rina)	2021 Goddesses of Stardom Tag League group stage match	5:44
4	Mina Shirakawa defeated Saya Kamitani and Maika	Three-way match	7:38
5	Donna Del Mondo (Himeka and Natsupoi) vs. Stars (Mayu Iwatani and Koguma) ended in a time-limit draw	Tag team match	15:00
6	Starlight Kid (c) vs. Momo Watanabe ended in a double count-out	Singles match for the High Speed Championship	11:50
7	Syuri (c) defeated AZM by submission	Singles match for the SWA World Championship and World of Stardom Championship challenge rights certificate	13:22
8	Tam Nakano (c) defeated Unagi Sayaka	Singles match for the Wonder of Stardom Championship	21:31
9	Utami Hayashishita (c) defeated Hazuki	Singles match for the World of Stardom Championship	25:24
(c) / – the champion(s) heading into the match; P / – the match was broadcast on the pre-show

== Tokyo Super Wars ==
Tokyo Super Wars
- Promotional poster featuring various superstars
- Promotion: World Wonder Ring Stardom
- Date: November 27, 2021
- City: Tokyo, Japan
- Venue: Yoyogi National Gymnasium
- Attendance: 1,119

The Tokyo Super Wars was the second part of the Stardom Super Wars Trilogy of events promoted by World Wonder Ring Stardom which took place on November 27, 2021. The preshow match was broadcast on Stardom's YouTube channel. The main sponsor of the event was Schwarzkopf Professional. Giulia joined the commentary team only for the title matches.

=== Event ===
The show featured eight professional wrestling matches that resulted from scripted storylines, where wrestlers portrayed villains, heroes, or less distinguishable characters in the scripted events that built tension and culminated in a wrestling match or series of matches.

After Ruaka successfully defended her Future of Stardom Championship against Mai Sakurai and Waka Tsukiyama in the pre-show, the masked superstar which also made and appearance at Kawasaki Wars back on November 3, attacked again but Starlight Kid rushed down the ring to save Ruaka. Hanan later stepped up to challenge the latter to a match for the Future title at Dream Queendom on December 29 which Ruaka accepted. After Stars defeated Oedo Tai in the six-woman tag team match, Rina challenged Hazuki to a match in which the loser won't be allowed to wear black lipstick anymore. Rina said that is her rightful gimmick. After Starlight Kid retained the High Speed Championship against Koguma, AZM came down to challenge her for a title shot. Koguma said that even if she lost she wants to challenge again. Kid accepted the three-way match for Dream Queendom on December 29. Following Nakano's successful defense against Shirakawa, Saya Kamitani who just became the number one contender earlier that night came down to challenge Tam for the Wonder of Stardom Championship with the latter accepting in for December 29.

The main event saw Utami Hayashishita defeating Maika to successfully defend the World of Stardom Championship for the ninth time in a row. After the match. Syuri came down to shake hands with Hayashishita, therefore officializing their World of Stardom Championship match at Dream Queendom on December 29.

=== Results ===
No.	Results	Stipulations	Times
1^{P}	Ruaka (c) defeated Mai Sakurai and Waka Tsukiyama	Three-way match for the Future of Stardom Championship	4:50
2	MOMOAZ (AZM and Momo Watanabe) defeated Unagi Sayaka and Lady C	Tag team match	9:36
3	Stars (Mayu Iwatani, Hazuki and Hanan) defeated Oedo Tai (Saki Kashima, Fukigen Death and Rina)	Six-woman tag team match	8:48
4	Saya Kamitani defeated Natsupoi and Himeka	Three-way match to determine the #1 contender for the Wonder of Stardom Championship	7:52
5	Starlight Kid (c) defeated Koguma	Singles match for the High Speed Championship	8:33
6	Syuri (c) defeated Konami	UWF rules match for the SWA World Championship and World of Stardom Championship challenge rights certificate	13:06
7	Tam Nakano (c) defeated Mina Shirakawa	Singles match for the Wonder of Stardom Championship	17:12
8	Utami Hayashishita (c) defeated Maika	Singles match for the World of Stardom Championship	23:43
(c) / – the champion(s) heading into the match; P / – the match was broadcast on the pre-show

== Osaka Super Wars ==
Osaka Super Wars
- Promotional poster featuring various superstars belonging to Oedo Tai and Queen's Quest
- Promotion: World Wonder Ring Stardom
- Date: December 18, 2021
- City: Osaka, Japan
- Venue: Osaka Prefectural Gymnasium
- Attendance: 1,222

The Osaka Super Wars was the third and final part of the Stardom Super Wars Trilogy of events promoted by World Wonder Ring Stardom which took place on December 18 2021. The only preshow match was broadcast on Stardom's YouTube channel.

=== Storylines ===
The show featured five professional wrestling matches that resulted from scripted storylines, where wrestlers portrayed villains, heroes, or less distinguishable characters in the scripted events that built tension and culminated in a wrestling match or series of matches. The event will host a four-team tournament in which the winner unit will receive a prize of ten million yen.

The event was scheduled to see Queen's Quest taking on Oedo Tai in an elimination tag team match with Momo Watanabe and Starlight Kid as captains of their own teams with the match set to culminate a feud between Watanabe and Starlight Kid which began at Kawasaki Super Wars and was part of Oedo Tai's strategy to try to gain more recruits into their unit. The captain of the losing team would forced to join the enemy unit in the process.

=== Event ===
The preshow match saw Syuri defeating Lady C, Mai Sakurai and Waka Tsukiyama in a 3-on-1 handicap gauntlet match. After Syuri left the venue, two masked silhouettes rushed to the ring to attack Sakurai, Tsukiyama and C. The fourth match of the event was disputed between Queen's Quest and Oedo Tai in the elimination tag team match. While down to Kid versus Watanabe, the latter betrayed the stable and attacked AZM with a steel chair to get herself disqualified in a shocking manner to join the enemy team. The former Queen's Quest leader declared that she would be Oedo Tai's black peach (reference to her real Japanese name Momo (モモ) meaning peach). The main event saw MaiHimePoi defeat Mayu Iwatani, Hazuki and Koguma to win the 10 million yen prize and also to retain the Artist of Stardom Championship for the second time on the same night after picking up a victory against Marvelous' Takumi Iroha, Rin Kadokura and Maria earlier. They received a challenge from Cosmic Angels' Unagi Sayaka, Mina Shirakawa and Mai Sakurai for Stardom Dream Queendom on December 29 which the Donna Del Mondo subgroup accepted.

=== Results ===
No.	Results	Stipulations	Times
1^{P}	Syuri defeated Mai Sakurai, Waka Tsukiyama and Lady C	3-on-1 handicap gauntlet match	7:15
2	MaiHimePoi (Maika, Natsupoi and Himeka) (c) defeated Marvelous (Takumi Iroha, Rin Kadokura and Maria)	Six-woman tag team match for both the ¥10 Million Unit Tournament semi-final and Artist of Stardom Championship	15:25
3	Stars (Mayu Iwatani, Hazuki and Koguma) defeated Cosmic Angels (Tam Nakano, Mina Shirakawa and Unagi Sayaka)	Six-woman tag team match for the ¥10 Million Unit Tournament semi-final	13:49
4	Oedo Tai (Starlight Kid, Saki Kashima, Konami and Ruaka) defeated Queen's Quest (Momo Watanabe, AZM, Saya Kamitani and Utami Hayashishita)	Eight-woman elimination tag team match Momo Watanabe eliminated herself to join Oedo Tai. Had Kid lost she would have been forced to unmask.	19:06
5	MaiHimePoi (Maika, Natsupoi and Himeka) (c) defeated Stars (Mayu Iwatani, Hazuki and Koguma)	Six-woman tag team ladder match for the ¥10 Million Unit Tournament briefcase and Artist of Stardom Championship	18:42
(c) / – the champion(s) heading into the match; P / – the match was broadcast on the pre-show
