= Stardom Dream Queendom 2023 =

2023 World Wonder Ring Stardom event

- Promotional poster of the event featuring various wrestlers
- Promotion: World Wonder Ring Stardom
- Date: December 29, 2023
- City: Tokyo, Japan
- Venue: Ryōgoku Kokugikan
- Attendance: 3,063

Event chronology
← Previous; New Blood 12	Next → New Years Stars

Dream Queendom chronology
← Previous; 2022	Next → 2024

Stardom Dream Queendom 2023 (スターダム ドリームクイーンダム 2023, Sutādamu dorīmukuīndamu 2023) was a professional wrestling event promoted by World Wonder Ring Stardom. It was the third annual Stardom Dream Queendom and took place on December 29, 2023, in Tokyo, Japan, at the Ryōgoku Kokugikan. It was the last pay-per-view organized by Stardom in 2023.

Eight matches were contested at the event, including one on the pre-show, and four of Stardom's ten championships were on the line. The main event saw Maika defeat Suzu Suzuki to win the vacant World of Stardom Championship. In other prominent matches, Saori Anou defeated Mirai to win the Wonder of Stardom Championship, and Giulia defeated Megan Bayne to retain the Strong Women's Championship.

== Production ==
=== Background ===
The show featured professional wrestling matches that result from scripted storylines, where wrestlers portray villains, heroes, or less distinguishable characters in the scripted events that build tension and culminate in a wrestling match or series of matches.

=== Storylines ===
The event's press conference was broadcast live on Stardom's YouTube channel on December 12, 2023. Besides the matches scheduled for the pay-per-view, it was announced that Tam Nakano would relinquish the World of Stardom Championship due to lingering injuries. A tournament was announced to take place on November 28, 2023, whose winner would face Grand Prix rightful challenger Suzu Suzuki for the vacant title at Dream Queendom on December 29, 2023. Mina Shirakawa, Momo Watanabe, Ami Sourei and Maika were announced as the participants. Maika would go on to win the tournament.

=== Event ===
The event started with the preshow bout which was broadcast live on Stardom's YouTube channel. Miyu Amasaki, Azusa Inaba and Yuzuki defeated Hanako, Kurara Sayaka and Ranna Yagami in six-woman tag team action. After the bout concluded, Tam Nakano came down to the ring to express her apologies for her sudden injury at the time, because of which she had to vacate the World of Stardom Championship earlier that year and that she would make an imminent comeback soon.

In the first main event bout, Ami Sohrei and Saki Kashima defeated Hina and Lady C, two thirds of the Artist of Stardom Champions Mai Sakurai and Thekla, and Yuna Mizumori and Saki in four-way tag team action. Next up, IWGP Women's Champion Mayu Iwatani, New Blood Tag Team Champions Hanan and Saya Iida, and Hazuki picked up a win over the team of Starlight Kid, Ruaka, Future of Stardom Champion Rina and Fukigen Death in eight-woman tag team competition. Next up, Nanae Takahashi, Yuu and AZM picked up a victory over Syuri, Club Venus leader Mina Shirakawa and High Speed Champion Mei Seira in six-woman tag team action. In the fifth match, Utami Hayashishita and Saya Kamitani defeated Natsuko Tora and Momo Watanabe to secure the first defense of the Goddesses of Stardom Championship in that respective reign. Next up, Donna Del Mondo leader Giulia defeated Megan Bayne to secure the seventh consecutive defense of the Strong Women's Championship in that respective reign. After the bout concluded, Giulia received a title challenge via video message from Trish Adora as their bout was scheduled for Battle in the Valley event on January 13, 2024. In the semi main event, Saori Anou defeated Mirai to win the Wonder of Stardom Championship, ending the champion's reign at 180 days and three successful defenses.

In the main event, Maika defeated Suzu Suzuki to win the vacant World of Stardom Championship.

== Results ==
No.	Results	Stipulations	Times
1^{P}	Miyu Amasaki, Azusa Inaba and Yuzuki defeated Hanako, Sayaka Kurara and Ranna Yagami	Six-woman tag team match	7:01
2	God's Eye (Ami Sohrei and Saki Kashima) defeated Queen's Quest (Hina and Lady C), Baribari Bombers (Mai Sakurai and Thekla) and Tropikawild (Yuna Mizumori and Saki)	Four-way tag team match	7:25
3	Stars (Eye Contact (Mayu Iwatani and Hanan) and Classmates (Hazuki and Saya Iida)) defeated Oedo Tai (YoungOED (Starlight Kid, Ruaka and Rina) and Fukigen Death)	Eight-woman tag team match	10:55
4	7Upp (Nanae Takahashi and Yuu) and AZM defeated Syuri, Mina Shirakawa and Mei Seira	Six-woman tag team match	11:41
5	AphrOditE (Utami Hayashishita and Saya Kamitani) (c) defeated XL (Natsuko Tora and Momo Watanabe)	Tag team match for the Goddesses of Stardom Championship	16:22
6	Giulia (c) defeated Megan Bayne by referee stoppage	Singles match for the Strong Women's Championship	17:02
7	Saori Anou defeated Mirai (c)	Singles match for the Wonder of Stardom Championship	24:43
8	Maika defeated Suzu Suzuki	Singles match for the vacant World of Stardom Championship	20:39
(c) / – the champion(s) heading into the match; P / – the match was broadcast on the pre-show
