= Stardom New Blood 12 =

2023 World Wonder Ring Stardom event

New Blood 12
- Promotional artwork of the event
- Promotion: World Wonder Ring Stardom
- Date: December 25, 2023
- City: Tokyo, Japan
- Venue: Shinagawa Intercity Hall
- Attendance: 254

Event chronology
← Previous; Nagoya Big Winter	Next → Dream Queendom 2023

New Blood chronology
← Previous; New Blood West 1	Next → New Blood 13

Stardom New Blood 12 (スターダム ニュー ブラッド 12, Sutādamu nyū Buraddo 12) was a professional wrestling event promoted by World Wonder Ring Stardom. The event took place on December 25, 2023, in Tokyo, Japan, at the Shinagawa Intercity Hall.

Six matches were contested at the event. The main event saw wing★gori (Hanan and Saya Iida) successfully defend the New Blood Tag Team Championship against Reiwa Tokyo Towers (Ami Sohrei and Lady C).

== Production ==
=== Background ===
"New Blood" is a series of events that mainly focus on matches where rookie wrestlers, usually with three or fewer years of in-ring experience, evolve. Besides wrestlers from Stardom, various superstars from multiple promotions of the Japanese independent scene are invited to compete in bouts that are usually going under the stipulation of singles or tag team matches.

The show featured six professional wrestling matches that result from scripted storylines, where wrestlers portray villains, heroes, or less distinguishable characters in the scripted events that build tension and culminate in a wrestling match or series of matches. The event's press conference took place on December 12, 2023, and was broadcast live on Stardom's YouTube channel.

=== Event ===
The entire event was broadcast live on Stardom's YouTube channel. In the first bout, Queen's Quest's Saya Kamitani defeated a debuting Sayaka Kurara. In the second one, God's Eye leader Syuri defeated a debuting Rana Yagami. Next up, High Speed Champion Mei Seira defeated Hina in singles competition. In the fourth bout, one third of the Artist of Stardom Champions Mai Sakurai and P.P.P. Tokyo's Chanyota picked up a win over Rina and Ruaka in tag team competition. In the semi main event, Haruka Umesaki and Miyu Amasaki defeated Yuzuki and Hanako in tag team action.

In the main event, Hanan and Saya Iida defeated Ami Sohrei and Lady C to secure the first successful defense of the New Blood Tag Team Championship in that respective reign. After the bout concluded, Mai Sakurai and Chanyota stepped up as the next challengers for the titles. The reigning team accepted, as the bout remaining to be scheduled on further notice.

== Results ==
No.	Results	Stipulations	Times
1	Saya Kamitani defeated Sayaka Kurara by pinfall	Singles match	8:27
2	Syuri defeated Ranna Yagami by pinfall	Singles match	9:45
3	Mei Seira defeated Hina by pinfall	Singles match	7:55
4	Mai Sakurai and Chanyota defeated YoungOED (Rina and Ruaka) by pinfall	Tag team match	8:03
5	Haruka Umesaki and Miyu Amasaki defeated Yuzuki and Hanako by pinfall	Tag team match	10:23
6	wing★gori (Hanan and Saya Iida) (c) defeated Reiwa Tokyo Towers (Ami Sohrei and Lady C) by pinfall	Tag team match for the New Blood Tag Team Championship	13:03
(c) / – the champion(s) heading into the match
