= Stardom Dream Queendom 2022 =

2022 World Wonder Ring Stardom event

- Promotional poster featuring Syuri and Giulia
- Promotion: World Wonder Ring Stardom
- Date: December 29, 2022
- City: Tokyo, Japan
- Venue: Ryōgoku Kokugikan
- Attendance: 3,869

Event chronology
← Previous; New Blood 6	Next → Triangle Derby 2023

Dream Queendom chronology
← Previous; 2021	Next → 2023

Stardom Dream Queendom 2022 (スターダム ドリームクイーンダム 2022, Sutādamu dorīmukuīndamu 2022) was a professional wrestling event promoted by World Wonder Ring Stardom. It was the second annual Stardom Dream Queendom and took place on December 29, 2022, in Tokyo at the Ryōgoku Kokugikan with limited attendance due in part to the ongoing COVID-19 pandemic at the time. It was also the last major pay-per-view hosted by Stardom in 2022.

== Production ==
=== Background ===
The show featured ten professional wrestling matches that resulted from scripted storylines, where wrestlers portrayed villains, heroes, or less distinguishable characters in the scripted events that built tension and culminated in a wrestling match or series of matches. The event's press conference took place on December 6, 2022, and was broadcast live on Stardom's YouTube channel.

=== Event ===
The preshow match was broadcast live on Stardom's YouTube channel. AZM retained the High Speed Championship against Hikari Shimizu, securing the ninth defense in a row and equalling the previous consecutive defenses record established by Mayu Iwatani.

The first match of the main card saw an internal stable clash between the teams of Saya Iida, Hazuki and Koguma, and Mayu Iwatani, Momo Kohgo and Hanan which ended with the victory of the latter team with no further consequences in the process. In the third match, Mina Shirakawa returned from the broken jaw injury she sustained on November 3 at Stardom Gold Rush. While coming down the idle, she was accompanied by Xia Brookside and Mariah May. Shirakawa and Sayaka won the match, and after the bout concluded, Shirakawa turned on Sayaka, ending their "Pink Kabuki" tag team tenure. However, Shirakawa later explained that she would remain part of Cosmic Angels, and announced that together with Brookside and May she will form the brand new "Club Venus" faction as a sub-unit. They also announced themselves as the mystery trio of Stardom Triangle Derby 2023. The fourth match saw MaiHime (Maika and Himeka) earn a future shot to the Goddesses of Stardom Championship after defeating the teams of Mirai and Ami Sourei, and Ruaka and Natsuko Tora. The fifth match saw IWGP Women's Champion Kairi and Queen's Quest leader Utami Hayashishita clash into a fifteen minute time limit draw. Next, Prominence's freelancer team of Risa Sera, Suzu Suzuki and Hiragi Kurumi defeated Oedo Tai's Momo Watanabe, Starlight Kid and Saki Kashima to capture the Artist of Stardom Championship. Next, Neo Stardom Army's sub tag team of 7Upp (Nane Takahashi and Yuu) defeated Tam Nakano and Natsupoi to win the Goddesses of Stardom Championship by exerciting their right after winning the 2022 Goddesses of Stardom Tag League. In the semi main event, Saya Kamitani secured her twelfth consecutive defense of the Wonder of Stardom Championship against World Woman Pro-Wrestling Diana's Haruka Umesaki. Kamitani issued an open challenge which was responded by Mina Shirakawa and Future of Stardom Champion Ami Sourei.

In the main event, Giulia who became number one contender for the World of Stardom Championship after winning the Stardom 5 Star Grand Prix 2022 succeeded in dethroning the "red belt" holder Syuri, ending the latter's reign at 365 days.

== Results ==
No.	Results	Stipulations	Times
1^{D}	Super Strong Stardom Machine and Super Strong Stardom Giant Machine won by lastly eliminating Miyu Amasaki (Note: The other participants in the match were Yuna Mizumori, Saki, Tomoka Inaba, Ram Kaicho, Kaori Yoneyama, Hina, Kikutaro, Rina and Waka Tsukiyama.)	Stardom Rambo	20:53
2^{P}	AZM (c) defeated Hikari Shimizu	Singles match for the High Speed Championship	9:39
3	Stars (Mayu Iwatani, Momo Kohgo and Hanan) defeated Stars (Hazuki, Koguma and Saya Iida)	Six-woman tag team match	12:04
4	Cosmic Angels (Unagi Sayaka and Mina Shirakawa (with Club Venus (Xia Brookside and Mariah May)) defeated Donna Del Mondo (Mai Sakurai and Thekla)	Tag team match	10:13
5	MaiHime (Maika and Himeka) defeated The New Eras (Mirai and Ami Sourei) and BMI2000 (Natsuko Tora and Ruaka)	Three-way tag team match to determine the #1 contenders to the Goddesses of Stardom Championship	10:06
6	Utami Hayashishita vs. Kairi ended in a time-limit draw	Singles match Whoever lost had to wrestle in their debut costume, with no gown, and no special ring entrance (no appealing to the crowd as they regularly did in their entrance).	15:00
7	Prominence (Risa Sera, Suzu Suzuki and Hiragi Kurumi) defeated Oedo Tai (Starlight Kid, Momo Watanabe and Saki Kashima) (c)	Six-woman hardcore tag team match for the Artist of Stardom Championship	15:54
8	7Upp (Nanae Takahashi and Yuu) defeated meltear (Tam Nakano and Natsupoi) (c)	Tag team match for the Goddesses of Stardom Championship	15:57
9	Saya Kamitani (c) defeated Haruka Umesaki	Singles match for the Wonder of Stardom Championship	16:33
10	Giulia defeated Syuri (c)	Singles match for the World of Stardom Championship	29:51
(c) / – the champion(s) heading into the match; D / – this was a dark match; P / – the match was broadcast on the pre-show
