= Stardom Dream Queendom (2021) =

2021 World Wonder Ring Stardom event

- Promotional poster featuring Syuri, Utami Hayashishita, Tam Nakano and Saya Kamitani
- Promotion: World Wonder Ring Stardom
- Date: December 29, 2021
- City: Tokyo, Japan
- Venue: Ryōgoku Kokugikan
- Attendance: 3,039

Event chronology
← Previous; Osaka Super Wars	Next → Nagoya Supreme Fight

Dream Queendom chronology
← Previous; First	Next → 2022

Stardom Dream Queendom (スターダムドリームクイーンダム, Sutādamudorīmukuīndamu) was a professional wrestling event promoted by World Wonder Ring Stardom. It was the inaugural Stardom Dream Queendom and took place on December 29, 2021, with a limited attendance due in part to the ongoing COVID-19 pandemic at the time. The event marked the last pay-per-view of 2021 hosted by the promotion. The preshow matches were broadcast on Stardom's YouTube channel.

== Storylines ==
=== Background ===
The show featured eight professional wrestling matches that resulted from scripted storylines, where wrestlers portrayed villains, heroes, or less distinguishable characters in the scripted events that built tension and culminated in a wrestling match or series of matches. On December 4, 2021, Konami announced she will be taking a hiatus from professional wrestling to attend her personal well-being. Giulia immediately stepped up to challenge her for a match on December 29 which she accepted.

=== Event ===
The show started with the five-way match between Lady C, Saki Kashima, Rina, Waka Tsukiyama and Fukigen Death won by the latter. Next was Stars unit member Hanan who defeated Ruaka to win the Future of Stardom Championship at 17 years of age, becoming the eight wrestler to ever hold the title. The event also portraited the fight between MaiHimePoi (Maika, Natsupoi and Himeka) and Cosmic Angels' Unagi Sayaka, Mina Shirakawa and Mai Sakurai who challenged Dona Del Mondo's subgroup back at Osaka Super Wars. MaiHimePoi succeeded in defending for the fourth time in a row. Starlight Kid successfully defended her High Speed Championship in a three-way match against AZM and Koguma. The confrontation between Giulia and Konami who saw the half-Italian superstar picking up the win against Stardom's sleeper represented Konami's last match before taking a planned hiatus from professional wrestling to deal with lingering injuries. Both Konami and Giulia wore Tokyo Cyber Squad style attires to pay tribute to the late Hana Kimura and to Konami's former unit. Giulia had a flag that said “Never End” which was an alternate of Konami's catchphrase "The End".

== Results ==
No.	Results	Stipulations	Times
1^{P}	Fukigen Death defeated Lady C, Waka Tsukiyama, Saki Kashima, and Rina	Five-way match	6:30
2^{P}	Hanan defeated Ruaka (c)	Singles match for the Future of Stardom Championship	5:20
3	MaiHimePoi (Maika, Natsupoi and Himeka) (c) defeated Cosmic Angels (Mina Shirakawa, Unagi Sayaka and Mai Sakurai)	Six-woman tag team match for the Artist of Stardom Championship	13:23
4	Starlight Kid (c) defeated AZM and Koguma	Three-way match for the High Speed Championship	7:56
5	Giulia defeated Konami	Singles match	12:06
6	Mayu Iwatani and Takumi Iroha defeated Hazuki and Momo Watanabe	Tag team match	15:36
7	Saya Kamitani defeated Tam Nakano (c)	Singles match for the Wonder of Stardom Championship	21:59
8	Syuri (SWA World) defeated Utami Hayashishita (World of Stardom)	Winner Takes All match for the World of Stardom Championship and SWA World Championship (Note: This match had no time limit.)	36:33
(c) / – the champion(s) heading into the match; P / – the match was broadcast on the pre-show
