= Konami (wrestler) =

Japanese professional wrestler (born 1996)

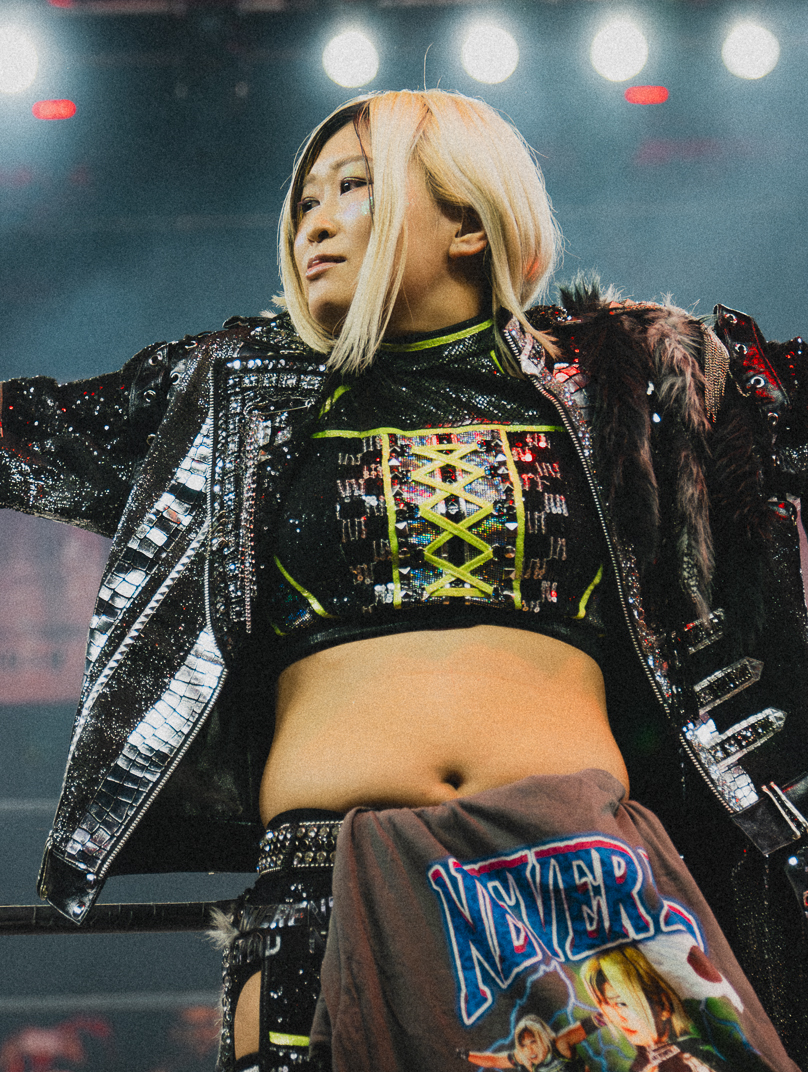
- Konami in April 2024

Personal information
- Born: Konami Takemoto (竹本 小波, Takemoto Konami); July 15, 1996 (age 30) Fukuyama, Hiroshima, Japan

Professional wrestling career
- Ring name(s): Konami; Masked Wan-chan
- Billed height: 156 cm (5 ft 1 in)
- Billed weight: 55 kg (121 lb)
- Trained by: Kana; Minoru Tanaka
- Debut: October 7, 2014

Konami Takemoto (竹本 小波, Takemoto Konami; born July 15, 1996), known mononymously as Konami, is a Japanese professional wrestler. She is signed to World Wonder Ring Stardom, where she is a member of the H.A.T.E. stable and a former Wonder of Stardom Champion.

Takemoto was trained by Kana and Minoru Tanaka, making her debut in February 2015. Konami spent her early career competing for independent promotions such as Pro Wrestling Wave, Reina and JWP, eventually signing to Reina. After leaving the promotion in July 2016, she went on a short hiatus before returning to pro wrestling in November and debuting for World Wonder Ring Stardom in December 2016, going on to become a regular in the promotion before signing full time in May 2018.

== Career ==
=== Early career (2015–2016) ===
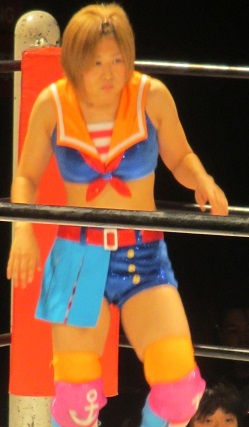
Konami in June 2015

Konami first developed an interest in pro wrestling through her brother, who was an avid fan himself and would regularly watch it on television. Eventually, she and her brother attended a local show where she met Kana, and expressed interest in becoming a wrestler. Kana told her to apply for training after she had at least graduated junior high school and gave her her contact details. While she attended high school, she trained under former MMA fighter Megumi Fujii at a local martial arts gym. After graduating from high school in 2014, she moved to Tokyo and began training under Kana and Minoru Tanaka. Konami debuted for Kanapromania in early 2015, initially competing as a member of Kana's agency. After Kana announced she would be leaving for WWE in late 2015, Konami was forced to leave the agency and soon after signed with Reina Joshi Puroresu. She also started competing for Pro Wrestling Wave and JWP, unsuccessfully challenging Rydeen Hagane for the JWP Junior Championship and the Princess of Pro-Wrestling Championship on July 17, 2016. In July, Konami announced her intention to resign from Reina, and on July 21, she co-promoted a final show with Reina, teaming with Yuko Miyamoto in a fluorescent light tubes deathmatch main event, losing to Jun Kasai and Kagetsu. After quitting Reina, Konami made appearances for World Woman Pro-Wrestling Diana and Wave, before announcing she would be taking an indefinite leave from pro wrestling after August 14 to treat and recover from internal diseases, but vowed to return. In her farewell match, she teamed with her trainer Minoru Tanaka in a loss to Cat Power and Onryo. While recovering from treatment, she announced she had signed with agency GPS, and would return at their produced show on November 5. In her return match, she lost to Kairi Hojo.

=== World Wonder Ring Stardom (2016–present) ===
==== Debut and initial feuds (2016–2017) ====
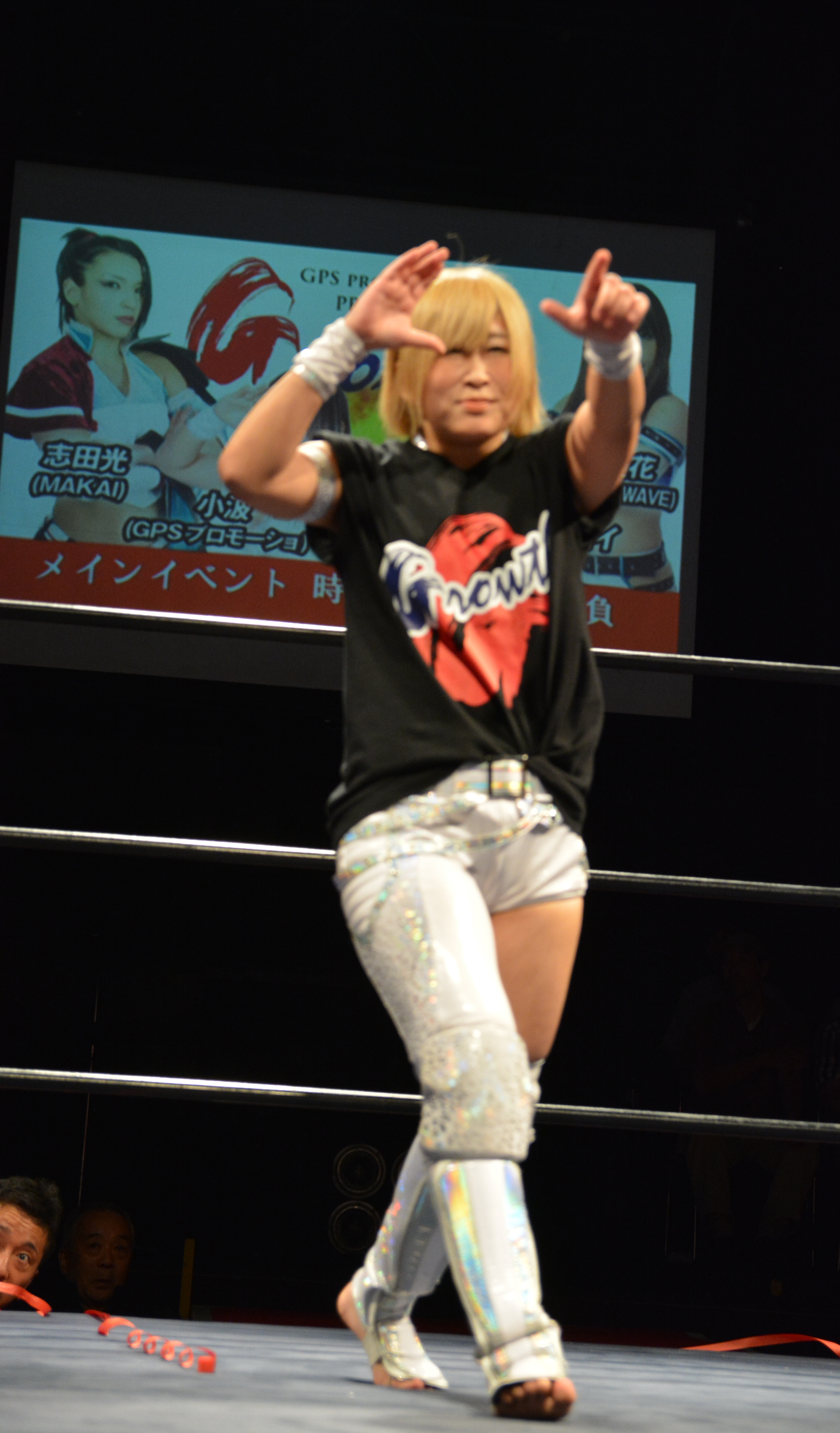
Konami in July 2017

Konami debuted for World Wonder Ring Stardom on December 22, 2016, defeating Hiromi Mimura, and confirmed she would be competing for the promotion regularly. She was pushed as a strong contender despite being a newcomer, wrestling in competitive matches against established wrestlers like Toni Storm, Io Shirai and Yoko Bito. She began a feud with Kairi Hojo, and unsuccessfully challenged for the Wonder of Stardom Championship on March 26, 2017. After losing to Hojo, the two formed an alliance, and teamed with Hiromi Mimura to win the Artist of Stardom Championship on May 6, 2017, giving Konami her first ever championship. They lost the titles less than a month later to Queen's Quest. Konami entered her first 5 Star Grand Prix in August but struggled greatly, losing all but one of her matches, defeating Mandy Leon on the final day. At Mask Fiesta 2017 on October 29, Konami, under the ring name Masked Wan-chan, donned a mask and teamed up with Aloha Bito and Shout Woman in a loss to Chupa Panda, Iotica and Mini Iotica.

==== Queen's Quest (2018–2019) ====
At the annual unit draft on April 15, 2018, Konami was picked by Io Shirai to be drafted into her Queen's Quest stable. On May 20, she officially announced that she had joined the Stardom roster full time. As a member of Queen's Quest, she received a shot at the Goddesses of Stardom Championship, teaming with Momo Watanabe in a loss to Mayu Iwatani and Saki Kashima. She entered the 5 Star Grand Prix once again and to greater success, finishing with 6 points but failing to make the final. On September 30, she unsuccessfully challenged Nicole Savoy for the Shimmer Championship. After 364 days in Queen's Quest, Konami was drafted to the Tokyo Cyber Squad on April 14, 2019.

==== Tokyo Cyber Squad (2019–2020) ====
At the 2019 Stardom Draft on April 14, 2019, Konami was drafted to the International Army stable, later known as Tokyo Cyber Squad. Konami took part in the 2019 Cinderella Tournament, making it to the final where she lost to Arisa Hoshiki. On May 16, Konami, Hana Kimura and Jungle Kyona defeated Iwatani, Tam Nakano and Kashima to win the Artist of Stardom Championship. Their reign lasted until June 23, losing them back to Iwatani, Nakano and Kashima. On July 15, Konami teamed with Kyona to defeat Utami Hayashishita and Watanabe to win the Goddesses of Stardom Championship.

==== Oedo Tai (2020–2021) ====
At the Stardom Cinderella Tournament 2020 on March 24, Konami made it to the second rounds where she fell short to Syuri. On September 28, 2020, Jungle Kyona challenged Natsuko Tora to a no disqualifications match where the loser would have to disband their group. Then, during that match at Stardom Yokohama Cinderella 2020 on October 3, Konami betrayed Kyona allowing Oedo Tai to pick up the win. She then subsequently joined them, effectively turning heel. On December 26, Konami alongside Bea Priestley defeated Hayashishita and Saya Kamitani to win the Goddesses of Stardom Championship.

Konami and Priestley dropped the Goddess titles on February 14, 2021, after losing to Donna Del Mondo (Himeka and Maika). At Stardom All Star Dream Cinderella on March 3, 2021, Konami unsuccessfully challenged Syuri for the SWA World Championship. At Stardom Cinderella Tournament 2021, Konami fell short to Maika in the first rounds of April 10. At the Stardom 5 Star Grand Prix 2021, Konami fought in the "Blue Stars" block where she scored a total of 10 points. At Tokyo Super Wars, the first event of the Stardom Super Wars trilogy which took place on November 27, 2021, Konami unsuccessfully challenged Syuri for both SWA World Championship and World of Stardom Championship challenge rights certificate. At Stardom Dream Queendom on December 29, 2021, Konami wrestled a match against Giulia, in which she fell short to the latter, announcing that she will take a hiatus from professional wrestling due to lingering injuries.

==== God's Eye (2022–2024) ====
Konami made a brief return, competing in three of the Stardom Golden Week Fight Tour events from May 1 to May 8, 2022, as the newest member of Syuri's God's Eye unit. On the May 5 show, she teamed up with Syuri, Ami Sourei and Mirai to defeat Donna Del Mondo (Giulia, Himeka, Natsupoi & Mai Sakurai). Konami made her return on November 3, 2022, at Hiroshima Goddess Festival where she teamed up with Ami Sourei and Mirai and went into a time-limit draw against Donna Del Mondo's Mai Sakurai, Giulia and Thekla.

==== H.A.T.E. (2024–present) ====
On July 23, 2024, Konami rejoined Oedo Tai. Five days later, on the second night of the Stardom Sapporo World Rendezvous, she was included in the newly-created unit of H.A.T.E.

== Championships and accomplishments ==
- Pro Wrestling Illustrated
  - Ranked No. 68 of the top 100 female wrestlers in the PWI Female 100 in 2019
  - Ranked No. 31 of the top 50 tag teams in the PWI Tag Team 50 in 2020 with Jungle Kyona
- World Wonder Ring Stardom
  - Artist of Stardom Championship (3 times) – with Hana Kimura and Jungle Kyona (1) and Hiromi Mimura and Kairi Hojo (1) and Rina and Fukigen Death (1)
  - Goddesses of Stardom Championship (3 times) – with Jungle Kyona (1), Bea Priestley (1) and Syuri (1)
  - Wonder of Stardom Championship (1 time)
  - 5★Star GP Award (4 times)
    - 5★Star GP Outstanding Performance Award (2018, 2020)
    - 5★Star GP Blue Stars Best Match Award (2025) vs. Sareee on July 27 in Blue Stars B
    - 5★Star GP Best Match Award (2026) vs. Rina on August 18
    - Stardom Year-End Award (2 times)
      - Best Tag Team Award (2019) – with Jungle Kyona
      - Best Technique Award (2020)
