= Stardom Dream Queendom =

- Promotions: World Wonder Ring Stardom
- First event: Stardom Dream Queendom (2021)

Stardom Dream Queendom (スターダムドリームクイーンダム, Sutādamudorīmukuīndamu) is an annual professional wrestling event promoted by World Wonder Ring Stardom. Since its inception in 2021, it has taken place on December 29, at Ryōgoku Kokugikan in Tokyo, Japan and it marks the last pay-per-view of the year hosted by the promotion.

== History ==
The inaugural Dream Queendom took place on December 29, 2021, at Ryōgoku Kokugikan in Tokyo, Japan, where the annual event has been held since its inception. The second event took place on December 29, 2022, thus establishing Stardom Dream Queendom as an annual event.

== Dates and venues ==
#	Event	Date	City	Attendance	Venue	Main Event	Ref
1	Stardom Dream Queendom	December 29, 2021	Tokyo, Japan	3,039	Ryōgoku Kokugikan	Utami Hayashishita (World of Stardom) vs. Syuri (SWA World) in a Winner Takes All match for the World of Stardom Championship and SWA World Championship	
2	Stardom Dream Queendom 2022	December 29, 2022	Tokyo, Japan	3,869	Ryōgoku Kokugikan	Syuri (c) vs. Giulia for the World of Stardom Championship	
3	Stardom Dream Queendom 2023	December 29, 2023	Tokyo, Japan	3,063	Ryōgoku Kokugikan	Maika vs. Suzu Suzuki for the vacant World of Stardom Championship	
4	Stardom Dream Queendom 2024	December 29, 2024	Tokyo, Japan	4,095	Ryōgoku Kokugikan	Tam Nakano (c) vs Saya Kamitani for the World of Stardom Championship	
5	Stardom Dream Queendom 2025	December 29, 2025	Tokyo, Japan	TBD	Ryōgoku Kokugikan	Saya Kamitani (c) vs. Saori Anou for the World of Stardom Championship	
