= Wonder of Stardom Championship =

Professional wrestling women's championship

- The current Wonder of Stardom Championship belt (2020–present)

Details
- Promotion: World Wonder Ring Stardom
- Date established: June 26, 2011
- Current champion: Hanan
- Date won: April 26, 2026
Statistics
- First champion: Yuzuki Aikawa
- Most reigns: 2 reigns: Act Yasukawa; Io Shirai; Mayu Iwatani; Tam Nakano; Saori Anou
- Longest reign: Yuzuki Aikawa (618 days)
- Shortest reign: Saori Anou (12 days)
- Oldest champion: Mina Shirakawa (35 years, 3 months and 28 days)
- Youngest champion: Momo Watanabe (18 years, 2 months and 1 day)
- Heaviest champion: Yoko Bito (62 kg (137 lb))
- Lightest champion: Starlight Kid (50 kg (110 lb))

The Wonder of Stardom Championship (ワンダー・オブ・スターダム王座, Wandā Obu Sutādamu Ōza) is a women's professional wrestling championship owned by the World Wonder Ring Stardom promotion. The title, which in Stardom's championship hierarchy is situated as the secondary title behind the World of Stardom Championship, was introduced on June 26, 2011, and the inaugural champion was crowned on July 24, 2011, when Yuzuki Aikawa defeated Yoshiko in a decision match. The reigning champion is Hanan in her first reign.

== Title history ==
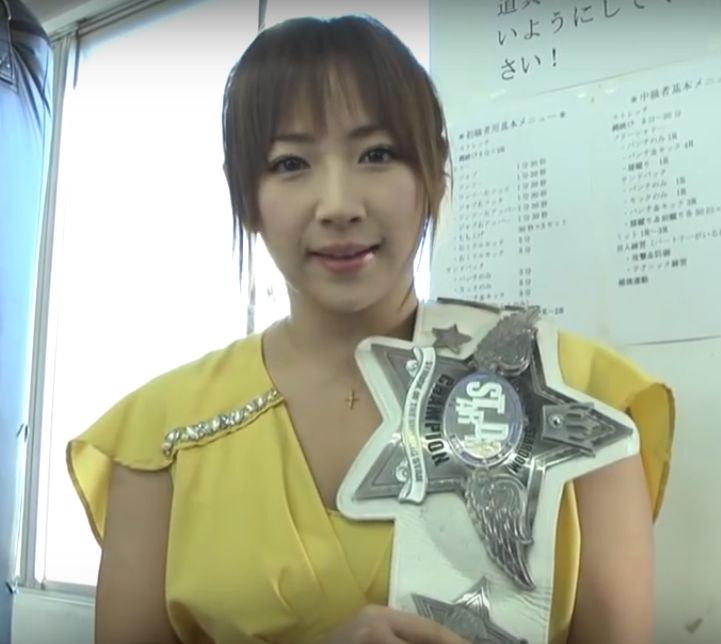
Yuzuki Aikawa with the former design of the title (2011–2018)

The title is often referred to simply as the "White Belt", a name famously used by All Japan Women's Pro-Wrestling (AJW) to refer to its All Pacific Championship. The title belt was crafted by American company Top Rope Belts based on designs sent by Stardom, with a conscious decision to imitate the AJW title belt in terms of its color, with Stardom president Rossy Ogawa referring to the promotion's heyday as the "Golden Age of Joshi Puroresu". The original title belt was awarded to undefeated inaugural champion Yuzuki Aikawa, when she retired from professional wrestling on April 29, 2013. It was replaced that same night by a second identical title belt.

Originally, only wrestlers officially signed to Stardom were eligible to challenge for the title, but this rule was abandoned in 2013, when Dark Angel and Yuhi were allowed to challenge for the title. Sarah Stock (wrestling under the name Dark Angel) became the first non-Japanese to win the title. When Santana Garrett won the title in November 2015, she started defending it in the United States, alongside the NWA World Women's Championship. Her six defenses on the American independent circuit were also recognized by Stardom.

=== July 2020 tournament ===
On May 20, 2020, the Wonder of Stardom Championship was vacated after Arisa Hoshiki retired. On July 12, a four-woman tournament was set-up to determine a new champion. On July 26, Giulia defeated Tam Nakano in the finals to become the new champion.

Semifinals (July 17)
Giulia
Konami
Natsuko Tora
Tam Nakano

Finals (July 26)
Giulia
Tam Nakano

== Reigns ==
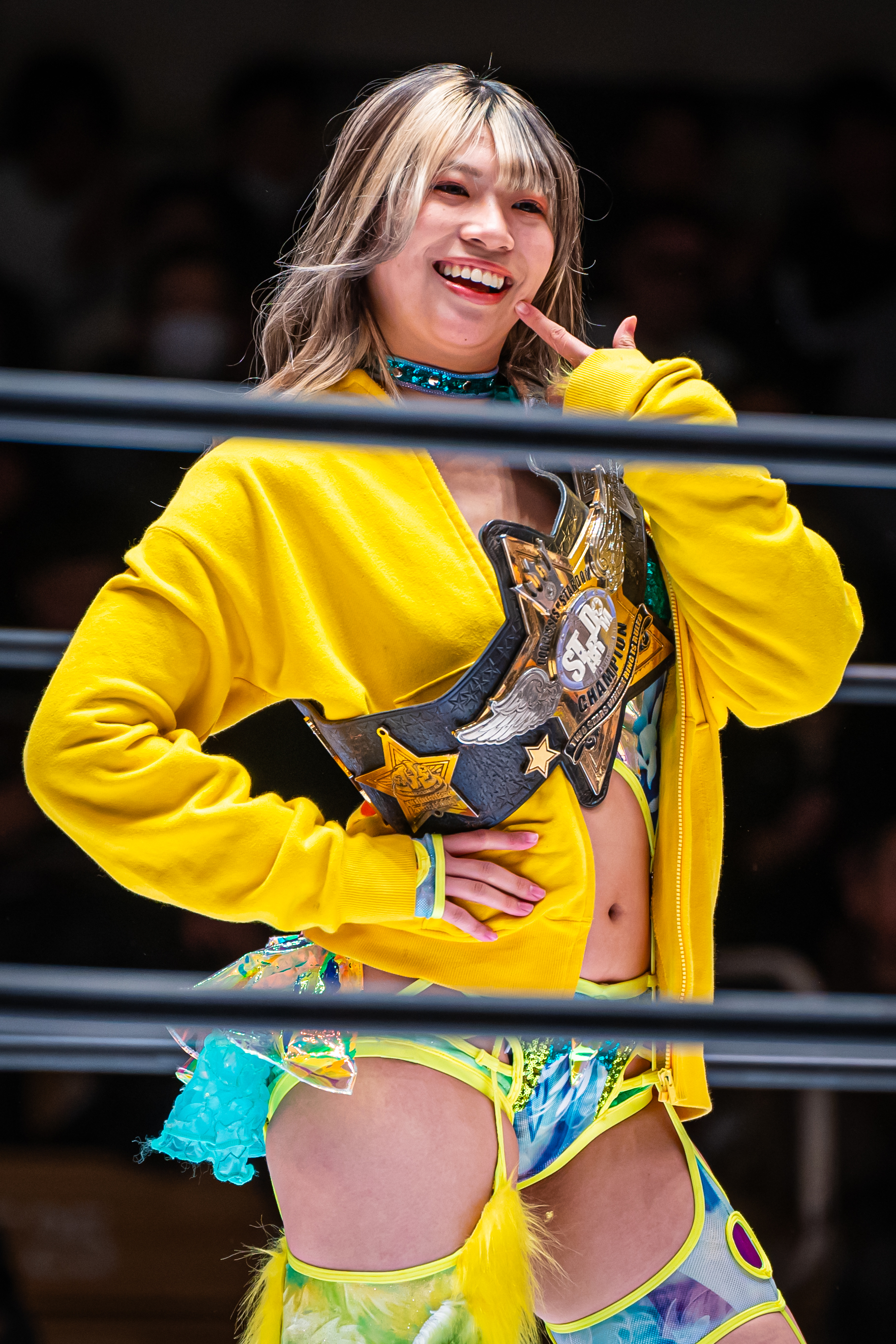
Current champion Hanan.

As of November 1, 2026, there have been a total of 26 reigns between 21 different champions and three vacancies. Yuzuki Aikawa was the inaugural champion as well as the longest reign at 618 days. Saori Anou's second reign is the shortest reign at 12 days. Act Yasukawa, Io Shirai, Tam Nakano, Mayu Iwatani and Saori Anou share the record of the most reigns with two each. Shirai had the most title defenses at 17 times. The current champion is Hanan who is in her first reign. She won the title by defeating Konami at All Star Grand Queendom on April 26, 2026.

Key
No.	Overall reign number
Reign	Reign number for the specific champion
Days	Number of days held
Defenses	Number of successful defenses
+	Current reign is changing daily

No.	Champion	Championship change			Reign statistics			Notes	Ref.
No.	Champion	Date	Event	Location	Reign	Days	Defenses	Notes	Ref.
World Wonder Ring Stardom (ST★RDOM)
1	Yuzuki Aikawa	July 24, 2011	Stardom × Stardom 2011	Tokyo, Japan	1	618	8	Defeated Yoshiko in a decision match to become the inaugural champion.	
—	Vacated	April 2, 2013	—	Tokyo, Japan	—	—	—	Yuzuki Aikawa vacated the championship due to retiring from professional wrestling on April 29, 2013.	
2	Dark Angel	April 29, 2013	Ryōgoku Cinderella	Tokyo, Japan	1	189	3	Defeated Act Yasukawa in a decision match to win the vacant championship.	
3	Act Yasukawa	November 4, 2013	Stardom 100th Commemorative Tournament	Tokyo, Japan	1	234	4		
—	Vacated	June 26, 2014	—	Tokyo, Japan	—	—	—	The championship was vacated after Act Yasukawa was sidelined with various health issues brought on by thyroid deterioration.	
4	Mayu Iwatani	July 27, 2014	Shining Stars 2014	Nagoya, Japan	1	175	2	Defeated Miho Wakizawa in the finals of a four-woman tournament to win the vacant championship.	
5	Act Yasukawa	January 18, 2015	Stardom 4th Anniversary	Tokyo, Japan	2	103	0		
—	Vacated	May 1, 2015	—	Tokyo, Japan	—	—	—	The championship was vacated after Act Yasukawa was sidelined with facial fractures.	
6	Io Shirai	May 17, 2015	Gold May 2015	Tokyo, Japan	1	190	7	Defeated Nikki Storm in a decision match to win the vacant championship.	
7	Santana Garrett	November 23, 2015	Goddesses of Stars 2015	Fukuoka, Japan	1	174	9	This was a title vs. title match, in which Garrett also defended the NWA World Women's Championship.	
8	Kairi Hojo	May 15, 2016	Gold May 2016	Tokyo, Japan	1	364	8		
9	Mayu Iwatani	May 14, 2017	Gold May 2017	Tokyo, Japan	2	132	2		
10	Yoko Bito	September 23, 2017	5☆Star GP 2017 × Champions	Osaka, Japan	1	57	2		
11	Io Shirai	November 19, 2017	Best of Goddesses 2017	Tokyo, Japan	2	185	10		
12	Momo Watanabe	May 23, 2018	Stardom Gold Star	Tokyo, Japan	1	358	13		
13	Arisa Hoshiki	May 16, 2019	Stardom Gold May 2019	Tokyo, Japan	1	370	10	This was Hoshiki's Cinderella Tournament granted wish.	
—	Vacated	May 20, 2020	—	—	—	—	—	Arisa Hoshiki vacated the championship as she announced her retirement from professional wrestling due to head and neck injuries.	
14	Giulia	July 26, 2020	Cinderella Summer in Tokyo	Tokyo, Japan	1	220	6	Defeated Tam Nakano to win the vacant championship. This was Giulia's Cinderella Tournament granted wish.	
15	Tam Nakano	March 3, 2021	All Star Dream Cinderella	Tokyo, Japan	1	301	6	This was a Hair vs Hair match.	
16	Saya Kamitani	December 29, 2021	Dream Queendom	Tokyo, Japan	1	480	15		
17	Mina Shirakawa	April 23, 2023	All Star Grand Queendom	Yokohama, Japan	1	34	1		
18	Tam Nakano	May 27, 2023	Flashing Champions	Tokyo, Japan	2	36	0	This was a Winner Takes All match in which Nakano's World of Stardom Championship was also on the line.	
19	Mirai	July 2, 2023	Mid Summer Champions 2023	Yokohama, Japan	1	180	3		
20	Saori Anou	December 29, 2023	Dream Queendom 2023	Tokyo, Japan	1	176	3		
21	Mika Iwata	June 22, 2024	Stardom The Conversion	Tokyo, Japan	1	23	0		
22	Saori Anou	July 15, 2024	Sendai Girls	Tokyo, Japan	2	12	0	This was a Sendai Girls' event. This was a winner takes all match in which Iwata's Sendai Girls World Championship was also on the line.	
23	Natsupoi	July 27, 2024	Sapporo World Rendezvous; Night 1	Sapporo, Japan	1	155	2		
24	Starlight Kid	December 29, 2024	Dream Queendom	Tokyo, Japan	1	309	6		
25	Konami	November 3, 2025	Crimson Nightmare	Tokyo, Japan	1	174	4		
26	Hanan	April 26, 2026	All Star Grand Queendom	Yokohama, Japan	1	189+	5		

== Combined reigns ==
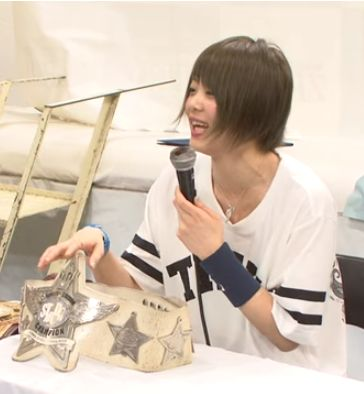
Record tying and former two-time champion, Mayu Iwatani

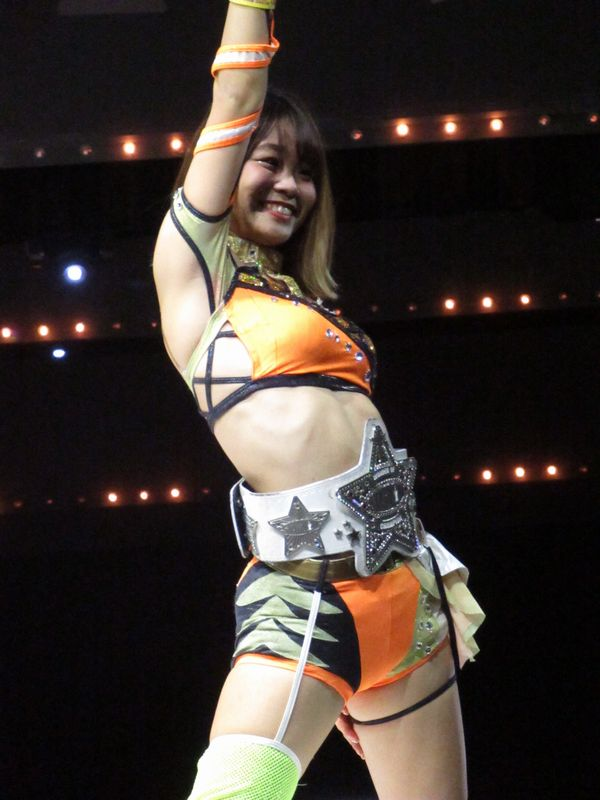
Arisa Hoshiki wearing the current design of the title.

As of November 1, 2026.

†	Indicates the current champion

Rank	Wrestler	No. of reigns	Combined defenses	Combined days
1	Yuzuki Aikawa	1	8	618
2	Saya Kamitani	1	15	480
3	Io Shirai	2	17	375
4	Arisa Hoshiki	1	10	370
5	Kairi Hojo	1	8	364
6	Momo Watanabe	1	13	358
7	Tam Nakano	2	6	337
7	Act Yasukawa	2	4	337
9	Starlight Kid	1	6	309
10	Mayu Iwatani	2	4	307
11	Giulia	1	6	220
12	Hanan †	1	5	189+
13	Dark Angel	1	3	189
14	Saori Anou	2	3	188
15	Mirai	1	3	180
16	Santana Garrett	1	9	174
16	Konami	1	4	174
18	Natsupoi	1	2	155
19	Yoko Bito	1	2	57
20	Mina Shirakawa	1	1	34
21	Mika Iwata	1	0	23

== See also ==
- World of Stardom Championship
- Goddesses of Stardom Championship
- IWGP Women's Championship
- All Pacific Championship
