= Saya Iida =

Japanese professional wrestler

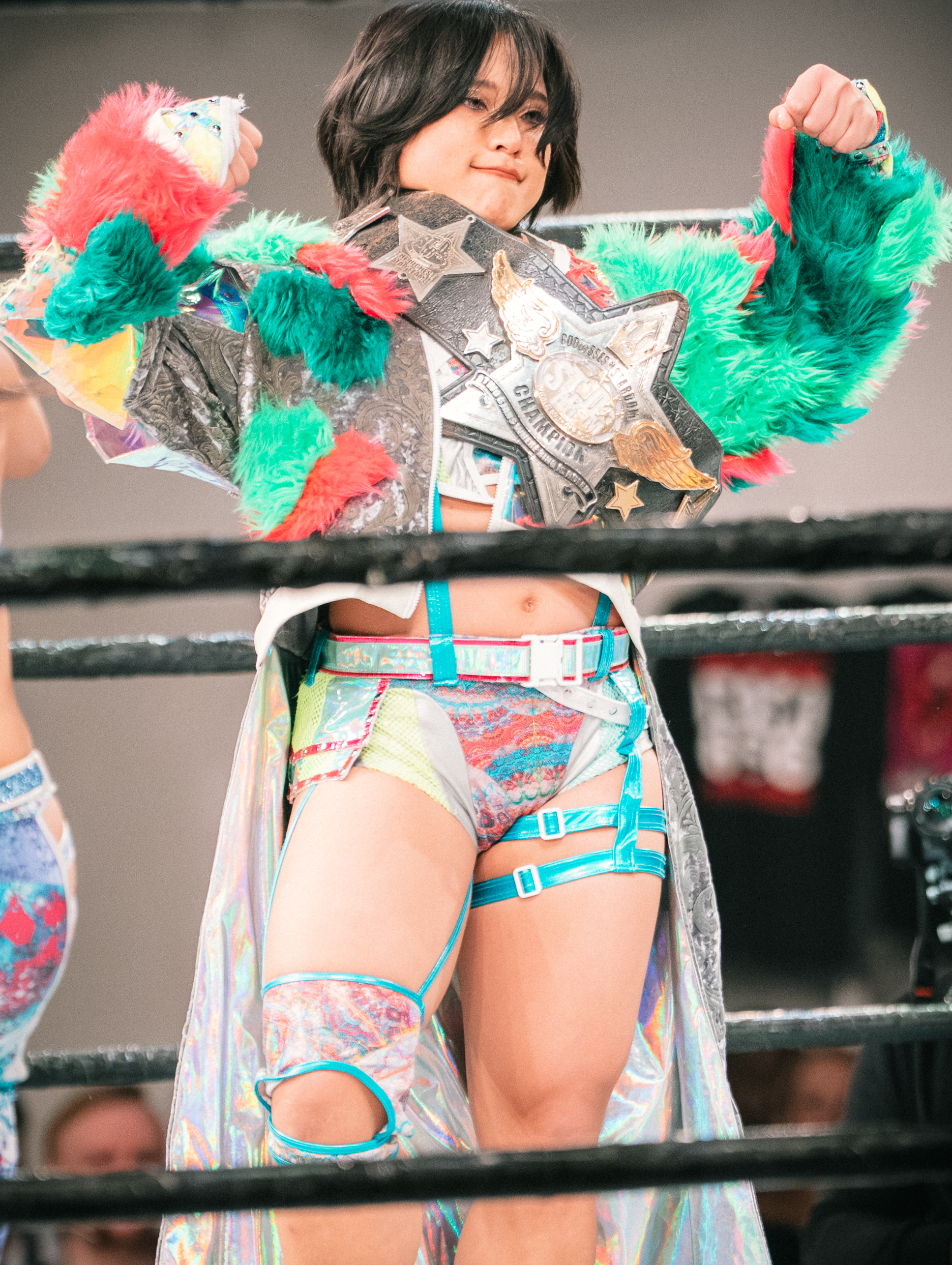
- Iida in April 2025 as one half of the Goddesses of Stardom Champions

Personal information
- Born: May 19, 1997 (age 29) Kashiwa, Chiba, Japan

Professional wrestling career
- Ring name(s): Saya Iida; Super Strong Stardom Machine
- Billed height: 145 cm (4 ft 9 in)
- Billed weight: 54 kg (119 lb)
- Billed from: Kashiwa, Chiba, Japan
- Trained by: Jungle Kyona; Kagetsu; Hazuki
- Debut: January 14, 2019

Saya Iida (飯田沙耶, Iida Saya; born May 19, 1997) is a Japanese professional wrestler. She is signed to World Wonder Ring Stardom, where she is a member of Stars. Iida is also a former one-time New Blood Tag Team Champion with Hanan and a former one-time Future of Stardom Champion.

== Professional wrestling career ==
=== World Wonder Ring Stardom (2019–present) ===
Iida made her debut at World Wonder Ring Stardom on January 14, 2019, at Stardom's 8th anniversary show where she faced Natsuko Tora in a losing effort. After the match, Iida joined "J.A.N." (Jungle Assault Nation), a unit consists of Jungle Kyona, Kaori Yoneyama, Ruaka, and Tora. On March 10, Iida received her first title match when she challenged Utami Hayashishita for the Future of Stardom Championship, but was unsuccessful. On April 14, during the annual draft, Kyona lost to a five-way against four other faction leaders where the loser of the match must disband their own unit, therefore, J.A.N. was forced to disband. Mayu Iwatani, the leader of "Stars", chose Iida to join her unit.

On February 24, 2020, Iida faced her trainer and former World of Stardom Champion Kagetsu in a losing effort during Kagetsu's retirement show, which took place outside of Stardom. On July 17, Iida faced Maika and Saya Kamitani in a three-way match for the vacant Future of Stardom Championship, which was won by Maika. On November 15, Iida challenged Maika for the Future of Stardom Championship, but was unsuccessful. After the match, Iida indicated she wanted one more match for the title, thus continuing her rivalry with Maika. On December 20, Iida defeated Maika to win the Future of Stardom Championship in a three-way, which also involved Kamitani.

On January 17, 2021, on Stardom's 10th anniversary show, Iida had her first successful title defense, when she defeated Unagi Sayaka to retain the Future of Stardom Championship. On May 10, The championship was vacated after Iida suffered a torn ACL and LCL injuries.

After a ten-month injury hiatus, Iida returned at Stardom New Blood 1 on March 11, 2022, where she teamed up with Hanan to defeat JTO's Tomoka Inaba and Aoi. At Stardom Cinderella Tournament 2022, Iida made it to the quarterfinals where she got defeated by Koguma. At New Blood 11 on September 29, 2023, Iida and Hanan, together as wing★gori, became the New Blood Tag Team Champions by defeating Bloody Fate.

== Championships and accomplishments ==
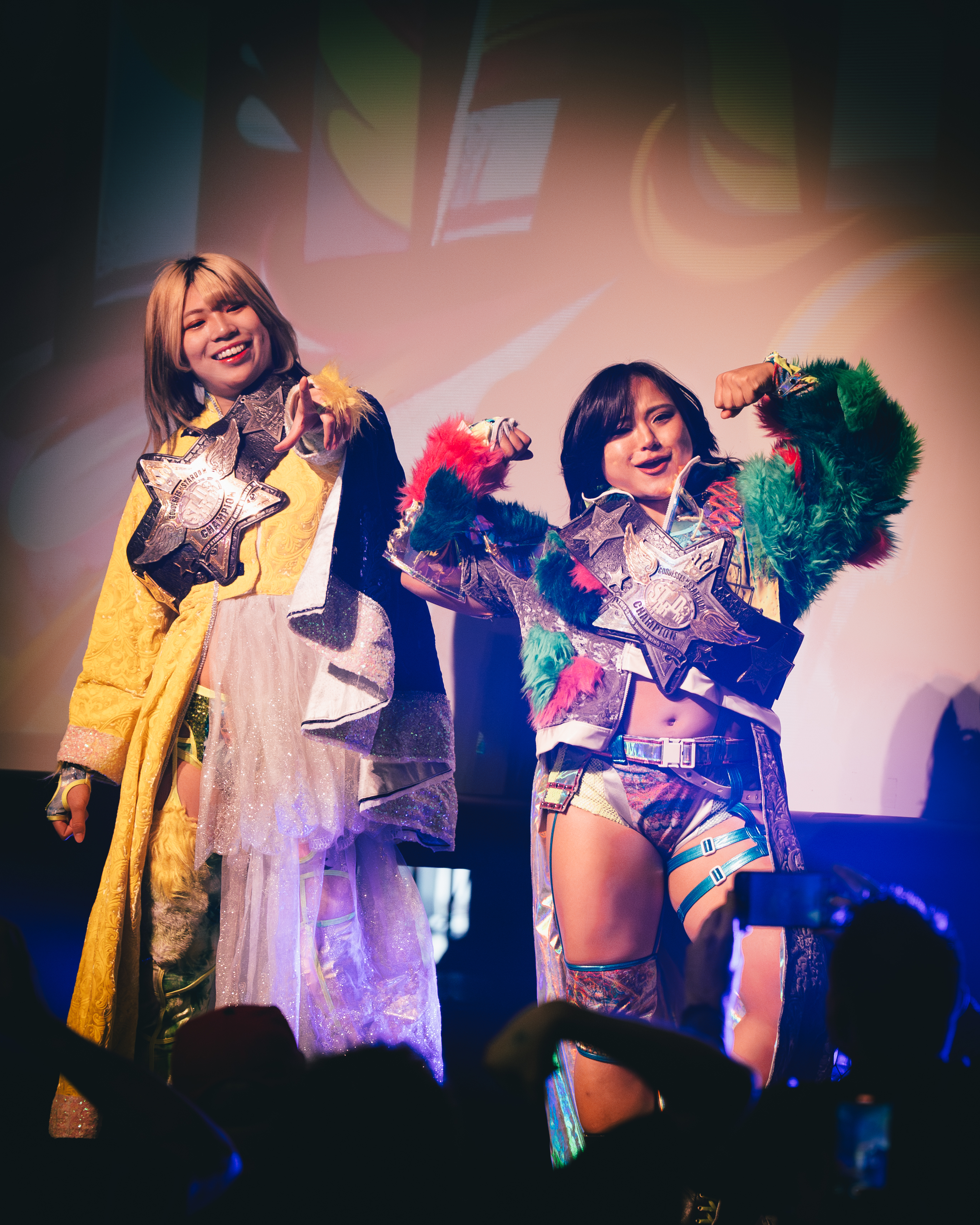
Iida with wing★gori tag team partner Hanan as the Goddesses of Stardom Champions.

- Pro Wrestling Illustrated
  - Ranked No. 211 of the top 250 female wrestlers in the PWI Women's 250 in 2024
- World Wonder Ring Stardom
  - Future of Stardom Championship (1 time)
  - New Blood Tag Team Championship (1 time) – with Hanan
  - Goddesses of Stardom Championship (1 time) – with Hanan
  - Goddesses of Stardom Tag League (2024) – with Hanan
  - Nagoya Rumble (2023)
  - Stardom Rambo (2022) shared with Super Strong Stardom Giant Machine
  - 5★Star GP Award (1 times)
    - 5★Star GP Fighting Spirit Award (2026)
  - Stardom Year-End Award (3 times)
    - Best Unit Award (2022) as part of Stars, shared with Hanan, Hazuki, Koguma, Mayu Iwatani and Momo Kohgo
    - Best Tag Team Award (2024) – with Hanan
    - Outstanding Performance Award (2025)
