= World of Stardom Championship =

Professional wrestling women's championship

- The current World of Stardom Championship belt (2020–present)

Details
- Promotion: World Wonder Ring Stardom
- Date established: June 26, 2011
- Current champion: Suzu Suzuki
- Date won: June 20, 2026
Statistics
- First champion: Nanae Takahashi
- Most reigns: 2 reigns: Io Shirai; Mayu Iwatani; Tam Nakano
- Longest reign: Nanae Takahashi (602 days)
- Shortest reign: Natsuko Tora (34 days)
- Oldest champion: Tam Nakano (36 years, 5 months and 9 days)
- Youngest champion: Yoshiko (21 years and 15 days)
- Heaviest champion: Alpha Female (95 kg (209 lb))
- Lightest champion: 52 kg (115 lb): Io Shirai; Kairi Hojo; Mayu Iwatani

The World of Stardom Championship (ワールド・オブ・スターダム王座, Wārudo Obu Sutādamu Ōza) is a women's professional wrestling world championship owned by the World Wonder Ring Stardom promotion. The title, which is situated at the top of Stardom's championship hierarchy, was introduced on June 26, 2011, and the inaugural champion was crowned on July 24, 2011, when Nanae Takahashi defeated Yoko Bito in the finals of a four-woman tournament. The reigning champion is Suzu Suzuki in her first reign.

== History ==
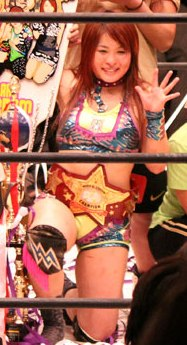
Io Shirai with the 2011–2020 design of the title.

=== Inaugural tournament (2011) ===
On July 24, 2011, Nanae Takahashi defeated Yoko Bito in the finals of a four-woman tournament to become the inaugural champion.

Semifinals
Mika Nagano	Pin
Yoko Bito	9:10
Mercedes Martinez
Nanae Takahashi	12:21

Finals
Yoko Bito
Nanae Takahashi	13:17

=== 2015 tournament ===
On February 22, 2015, during a title match between then-champion Yoshiko and Act Yasukawa, Yoshiko began shooting on Yasukawa, legitimately injuring her, with the match having to be ended prematurely. Yasukawa was diagnosed with fractured cheek, nasal and orbital bones, which would require surgery. Three days later, Yoshiko was stripped of the title. On March 29, Kairi Hojo defeated Io Shirai in the finals of a four-woman tournament to win the vacant championship.

Semifinals
Io Shirai	Pin
Takumi Iroha	17:43
Kairi Hojo	Pin
Kyoko Kimura	12:24

Finals
Io Shirai	18:46
Kairi Hojo	Pin

On September 24, 2017, during a match between defending champion Mayu Iwatani against Toni Storm, Iwatani legitimately dislocated her elbow, prompting the referee to stop the match and award the championship to Storm.

=== Origin and belt design ===
The title is often referred to simply as the "Red Belt", a name famously used by All Japan Women's Pro-Wrestling (AJW) to refer to its WWWA World Single Championship (of which Takahashi had been the last titleholder back in 2006). The title belt was crafted by American company Top Rope Belts, with a conscious decision to imitate the AJW title belt in terms of its color, with Stardom president Rossy Ogawa referring to the promotion's heyday as the "Golden Age of Joshi Puroresu". The title has also been defended in Mexico and France.

== Reigns ==
As of November 22, 2026, there have been 21 reigns between 18 champions and two vacancies. Nanae Takahashi was the inaugural champion, as well as the longest reign at 602 days. Natsuko Tora has the shortest reign at 34 days. Io Shirai, Mayu Iwatani and Tam Nakano have the most reigns at two. Tam Nakano is the oldest champion at 36 years old, while Yoshiko is the youngest at 21 years old.

Suzu Suzuki is the current champion in her first reign. She won the title by defeating Sayaka Kurara at Stardom The Conversion on June 20, 2026.

Key
No.	Overall reign number
Reign	Reign number for the specific champion
Days	Number of days held
Defenses	Number of successful defenses
+	Current reign is changing daily

No.	Champion	Championship change			Reign statistics			Notes	Ref.
No.	Champion	Date	Event	Location	Reign	Days	Defenses	Notes	Ref.
World Wonder Ring Stardom (ST★RDOM)
1	Nanae Takahashi	July 24, 2011	Stardom × Stardom 2011	Tokyo, Japan	1	602	7	Defeated Yoko Bito in the finals of a four-woman tournament to become the inaugural champion.	
2	Alpha Female	March 17, 2013	Stardom the Highest 2013	Tokyo, Japan	1	43	0		
3	Io Shirai	April 29, 2013	Ryōgoku Cinderella	Tokyo, Japan	1	468	10		
4	Yoshiko	August 10, 2014	Stardom × Stardom 2014	Tokyo, Japan	1	199	3 (Note: Following Yoshiko's suspension the result of her third successful title defense was retroactively changed to a no contest.)		
—	Vacated	February 25, 2015	—	Tokyo, Japan	—	—	—	Yoshiko was stripped of the championship and suspended indefinitely for legitimately beating and injuring Act Yasukawa in her fourth title defense on February 22.	
5	Kairi Hojo	March 29, 2015	Stardom the Highest 2015	Tokyo, Japan	1	119	3	Defeated Io Shirai in the finals of a four-woman tournament to win the vacant championship.	
6	Meiko Satomura	July 26, 2015	Stardom × Stardom 2015: Manatsu no Saiten	Tokyo, Japan	1	150	1		
7	Io Shirai	December 23, 2015	Stardom Yearend Climax 2015: Nenkan Saishū Kessen	Tokyo, Japan	2	546	14		
8	Mayu Iwatani	June 21, 2017	Galaxy Stars 2017	Tokyo, Japan	1	95	2		
9	Toni Storm	September 24, 2017	5☆Star GP 2017 × Champions in Nagoya	Nagoya, Japan	1	258	3	Won the title via referee stoppage after Mayu Iwatani legitimately dislocated her elbow during the match.	
10	Kagetsu	June 9, 2018	Stardom Shining Stars 2018	Yokohama, Japan	1	329	8		
11	Bea Priestley	May 4, 2019	Golden Week Stars 2019 Queen's Quest Produce	Tokyo, Japan	1	184	5		
12	Mayu Iwatani	November 4, 2019	Best Of Goddess 2019	Tokyo, Japan	2	377	5		
13	Utami Hayashishita	November 15, 2020	Sendai Cinderella	Sendai, Japan	1	409	9		
14	Syuri	December 29, 2021	Dream Queendom 2021	Tokyo, Japan	1	365	10	This was a Winner Takes All match in which Syuri's SWA World Championship was also on the line.	
15	Giulia	December 29, 2022	Dream Queendom 2022	Tokyo, Japan	1	115	2		
16	Tam Nakano	April 23, 2023	All Star Grand Queendom	Yokohama, Japan	1	211	3		
—	Vacated	November 20, 2023	—	Tokyo, Japan	—	—	—	The championship was vacated after Tam Nakano was sidelined with an injury.	
17	Maika	December 29, 2023	Dream Queendom 2023	Tokyo, Japan	1	212	6	Defeated Suzu Suzuki to win the vacant championship.	
18	Natsuko Tora	July 28, 2024	Sapporo World Rendezvous (Night 2)	Sapporo, Japan	1	34	0		
19	Tam Nakano	August 31, 2024	5Star Grand Prix (Night 12)	Tokyo, Japan	2	120	2		
20	Saya Kamitani	December 29, 2024	Dream Queendom 2024	Tokyo, Japan	1	483	9		
21	Sayaka Kurara	April 26, 2026	All Star Grand Queendom 2026	Yokohama, Japan	1	55	1	This was a Stable vs Title match. Had Kurara lost, her stable of Cosmic Angels would have had to disband.	
22	Suzu Suzuki	June 20, 2026	The Conversion	Tokyo, Japan	1	155+	3		

== Combined reigns ==
As of November 22, 2026.

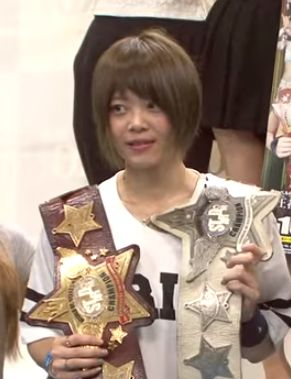
Record tying two-time champion Mayu Iwatani with the 2011–2020 design of the title (left), as well as the Wonder of Stardom Championship (right).

†	Indicates the current champion

Rank	Wrestler	No. of reigns	Combined defenses	Combined days
1	Io Shirai	2	24	1,014
2	Nanae Takahashi	1	7	602
3	Saya Kamitani	1	9	483
4	Mayu Iwatani	2	7	472
5	Utami Hayashishita	1	9	409
6	Syuri	1	10	365
7	Tam Nakano	2	5	331
8	Kagetsu	1	8	329
9	Toni Storm	1	3	258
10	Maika	1	6	212
11	Yoshiko	1	3	199
12	Bea Priestley	1	5	184
13	Suzu Suzuki †	1	3	155+
14	Meiko Satomura	1	1	150
15	Kairi Hojo	1	3	119
16	Giulia	1	2	115
17	Sayaka Kurara	1	1	55
18	Alpha Female	1	0	43
19	Natsuko Tora	1	0	34

== See also ==
- Wonder of Stardom Championship
- Goddesses of Stardom Championship
- IWGP Women's Championship
- World Women's Championship (disambiguation)
