= Goddesses of Stardom Championship =

Professional wrestling women's tag team championship

- The Goddesses of Stardom Championship belts

Details
- Promotion: World Wonder Ring Stardom
- Date established: August 2, 2011
- Current champions: 02line (AZM and Miyu Amasaki)
- Date won: April 26, 2026
Statistics
- First champions: BY Hou (Yoko Bito and Yuzuki Aikawa)
- Most reigns: As tag team (3 reigns): FWC (Hazuki and Koguma); As individual (3 reigns): Jungle Kyona; Kairi Hojo; Kyoko Kimura; Nanae Takahashi; Utami Hayashishita; Hazuki; Koguma; Konami; Momo Watanabe
- Longest reign: Thunder Rock (Io Shirai and Mayu Iwatani) (407 days)
- Shortest reign: God's Eye (Syuri and Konami) (24 days)
- Oldest champion: Nanae Takahashi (44 years and 6 days)
- Youngest champion: Yoshiko (19 years, 3 months and 30 days)
- Heaviest champion: Yuu (110 kg (240 lb))
- Lightest champion: Natsumi Showzuki and Yuzuki Aikawa (50 kg (110 lb))

The Goddesses of Stardom Championship (ゴッデス・オブ・スターダム王座, Goddesu Obu Sutādamu Ōza) is a women's professional wrestling tag team championship created and promoted by the World Wonder Ring Stardom promotion. After the title was established on August 2, 2011, BY Hou (Yoko Bito and Yuzuki Aikawa) were crowned as the inaugural champions on November 27, 2011, after winning the Goddesses of Stardom Tag League 2011 tournament. The reigning champions are 02line (AZM and Miyu Amasaki) in their first reign as a team.

== Title history ==
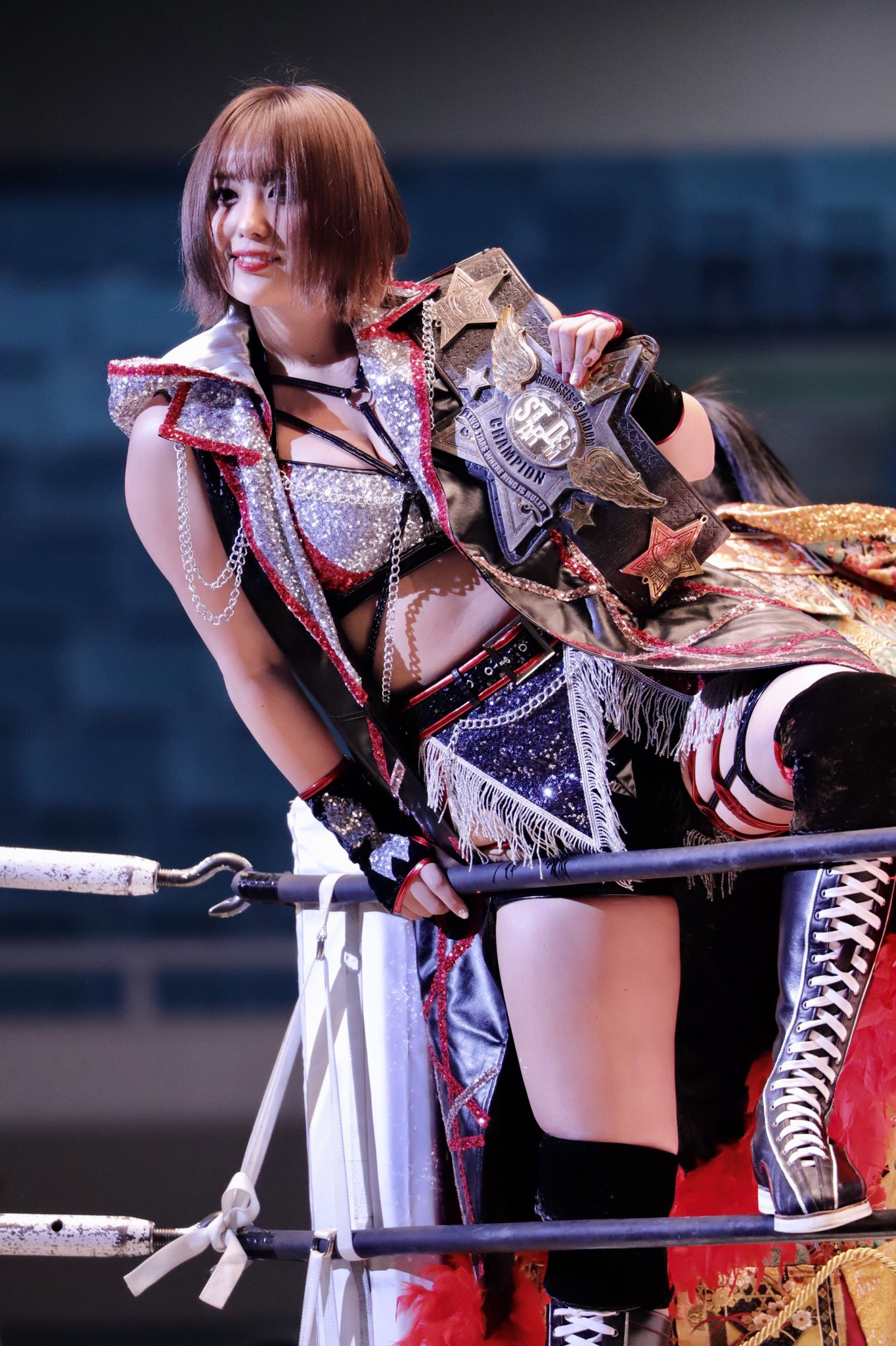
Himeka with one half of the Goddesses of Stardom Championship title belt in 2021

On August 2, 2011, Stardom held a press conference to announce the first ever Goddesses of Stardom Tag League, which would culminate in the crowning of the first Goddesses of Stardom Champions. The finals of the tournament took place on November 27, 2011, and saw BY Hou (Yoko Bito and Yuzuki Aikawa) defeat Kawasaki Katsushika Saikyou Densetsu (Natsuki☆Taiyo and Yoshiko) to become the inaugural champions. The title belt was crafted by American company Top Rope Belts.

Like most professional wrestling championships, the title is won as a result of a scripted match.

== Reigns ==
As of November 22, 2026, there have been a total of 37 reigns shared between 34 teams composed of 48 individual champions and five vacancies. The inaugural champions were BY Hou (Yoko Bito and Yuzuki Aikawa). The team of FWC (Hazuki and Koguma) hold the record with the most reigns at three, while individually, Jungle Kyona, Kairi Hojo, Kyoko Kimura, Nanae Takahashi, Utami Hayashishita, Konami and Momo Watanabe are tied with most individual reigns at three. As a team, BY Hou has the longest reign at 433 days, while God’s Eye (Syuri and Konami) has the shortest reign at 24 days. Nanae Takahashi is the oldest champion at 44 years old, while Yoshiko is the youngest at 19 years old.

02line (AZM and Miyu Amasaki) are the current champions in their first reign as a team and individually. They won the title by defeating BMI2000 (Natsuko Tora and Ruaka) at Stardom All Star Grand Queendom on April 26, 2026, in Yokohama, Japan.

Key
No.	Overall reign number
Reign	Reign number for the specific team—reign numbers for the individuals are in parentheses, if different
Days	Number of days held
Defenses	Number of successful defenses
+	Current reign is changing daily

No.	Champion	Championship change			Reign statistics			Notes	Ref.
No.	Champion	Date	Event	Location	Reign	Days	Defenses	Notes	Ref.
World Wonder Ring Stardom (ST★RDOM)
1	BY Hou (Yoko Bito and Yuzuki Aikawa)	November 27, 2011	Goddesses of Stardom Tag League 2011	Tokyo, Japan	1	310	2	Defeated Kawasaki Katsushika Saikyou Densetsu (Natsuki☆Taiyo and Yoshiko) in the finals of the 2011 Goddesses of Stardom Tag League to become the inaugural champions.	
—	Vacated	October 2, 2012	—	Tokyo, Japan	—	—	—	The championship was vacated after Yoko Bito had been sidelined with a cervical hernia two months earlier.	
2	Kawasaki Katsushika Saikyou Densetsu (Natsuki☆Taiyo and Yoshiko)	November 25, 2012	Goddesses of Stardom Tag League 2012	Tokyo, Japan	1	112	3	Defeated Ho-Show Tennyo (Kairi Hojo and Natsumi Showzuki) in the finals of the 2012 Goddesses of Stardom Tag League to win the vacant championship.	
3	Kimura Monster-gun (Hailey Hatred and Kyoko Kimura)	March 17, 2013	Stardom the Highest 2013	Tokyo, Japan	1	43	0		
4	Ho-Show Tennyo (Kairi Hojo and Natsumi Showzuki)	April 29, 2013	Ryōgoku Cinderella	Tokyo, Japan	1	34	0		
—	Vacated	June 2, 2013	Stardom Golden Age	Tokyo, Japan	—	—	—	The championship was vacated after Natsumi Showzuki was sidelined with a cervical spine injury.	
5	Nanamiho (Miho Wakizawa and Nanae Takahashi)	July 15, 2013	Chapter Two Beginning	Osaka, Japan	1	195	1	Defeated Kawasaki Katsushika Saikyou Densetsu (Natsuki☆Taiyo and Yoshiko) in the finals of a four-team tournament to win the vacant championship.	
6	Kimura Monster-gun (Alpha Female and Kyoko Kimura)	January 26, 2014	Stardom 3rd Year Anniversary	Tokyo, Japan	1 (1, 2)	196	3		
7	7Kairi (Kairi Hojo and Nanae Takahashi)	August 10, 2014	Stardom × Stardom 2014	Tokyo, Japan	1 (2, 2)	261	3		
—	Vacated	April 28, 2015	—	—	—	—	—	The championship was vacated after Nanae Takahashi was sidelined with an ankle injury.	
8	Thunder Rock (Io Shirai and Mayu Iwatani)	May 6, 2015	Golden Week Stars 2015	Tokyo, Japan	1	407	11	Defeated Candy Crush (Chelsea and Kairi Hojo) in the finals of a four-team tournament to win the vacant championship.	
9	Oedo Tai (Kagetsu and Kyoko Kimura)	June 16, 2016	Premium Stars 2016	Tokyo, Japan	1 (1, 3)	189	2		
10	BY Hou (Kairi Hojo and Yoko Bito)	December 22, 2016	Yearend Climax 2016	Tokyo, Japan	1 (3, 2)	73	1		
11	Team Jungle (Hiroyo Matsumoto and Jungle Kyona)	March 5, 2017	Champion Around the World in Nagoya	Tokyo, Japan	1	108	2	After winning the championship, Kyona and Matsumoto named their team as Team Jungle.	
12	Oedo Tai (Hana Kimura and Kagetsu)	June 21, 2017	Galaxy Stars 2017	Tokyo, Japan	1 (1, 2)	347	8		
13	Stars (Mayu Iwatani and Saki Kashima)	June 3, 2018	Stardom Queen's Fes In Sapporo	Sapporo, Japan	1 (2, 1)	119	3		
14	J.A.N. (Jungle Kyona and Natsuko Tora)	September 30, 2018	Stardom 5★Star Grand Prix 2018 - Grand Champion Carnival	Nagoya, Japan	1 (2, 1)	54	0		
15	Queen's Quest (Momo Watanabe and Utami Hayashishita)	November 23, 2018	Stardom Best of the Goddesses 2018	Tokyo, Japan	1	234	6		
16	Tokyo Cyber Squad (Jungle Kyona and Konami)	July 15, 2019	Stardom World Big Summer In Nagoya	Nagoya, Japan	1 (3, 1)	188	3		
17	Oedo Tai (Bea Priestley and Jamie Hayter)	January 19, 2020	Stardom 9th Anniversary	Tokyo, Japan	1	183	1		
—	Vacated	July 20, 2020	—	—	—	—	—	The championship was vacated after Bea Priestley and Jamie Hayter could not defend the championship due to the COVID-19 pandemic.	
18	AphroditE (Saya Kamitani and Utami Hayashishita)	July 26, 2020	Cinderella Summer in Tokyo	Tokyo, Japan	1 (1, 2)	153	2	Defeated Tokyo Cyber Squad (Jungle Kyona and Konami) to win the vacant championship. Named their tag team AphroditE in December 2020 via YouTube.	
19	Oedo Tai (Bea Priestley and Konami)	December 26, 2020	Year End Climax	Tokyo, Japan	1 (2, 2)	50	1		
20	MaiHime (Himeka and Maika)	February 14, 2021	Stardom Go To Budokan! Valentine Special - Day 2	Tokyo, Japan	1	49	2		
21	Donna Del Mondo/Alto Livello Kabaliwan (Giulia and Syuri)	April 4, 2021	Yokohama Dream Cinderella	Yokohama, Japan	1	280	4	Giulia and Syuri named their tag team Alto Livello Kabaliwan on May 1, 2021 via Twitter.	
22	Fukuoka Double Crazy (Hazuki and Koguma)	January 9, 2022	Stardom in Korakuen Hall	Tokyo, Japan	1	76	2		
23	Black Desire (Momo Watanabe and Starlight Kid)	March 26, 2022	World Climax 2022 (Night 1)	Tokyo, Japan	1 (2, 1)	40	1		
24	Fukuoka Double Crazy (Hazuki and Koguma)	May 5, 2022	Golden Week Fight Tour	Fukuoka, Japan	2	108	4		
25	meltear (Natsupoi and Tam Nakano)	August 21, 2022	Stardom x Stardom: Nagoya Midsummer Encounter	Nagoya, Japan	1	130	2	Nakano and Natsupoi began using their team name after Stardom announced the teams for the 2022 edition of the Goddesses of Stardom Tag League.	
26	7Upp (Nanae Takahashi and Yuu)	December 29, 2022	Dream Queendom 2	Tokyo, Japan	1 (3, 1)	115	2		
27	The New Eras (Ami Sourei and Mirai)	April 23, 2023	All Star Grand Queendom	Yokohama, Japan	1	63	2		
28	Rose Gold (Mariah May and Mina Shirakawa)	June 25, 2023	Stardom Sunshine 2023	Tokyo, Japan	1	49	1		
29	REStart (Natsupoi and Saori Anou)	August 13, 2023	Stardom x Stardom: Osaka Summer Team	Osaka, Japan	1 (2, 1)	99	1		
—	Vacated	November 20, 2023	—	Tokyo, Japan	—	—	—	The championship was vacated after Natsupoi was sidelined with a cervical hernia injury.	
30	AphroditE (Saya Kamitani and Utami Hayashishita)	December 2, 2023	Stardom Nagoya Big Winter	Nagoya, Japan	2 (2, 3)	119	1	Defeated Divine Kingdom (Maika and Megan Bayne) to win the vacant titles.	
31	Crazy Star (Suzu Suzuki and Mei Seira)	March 30, 2024	Stardom in Sendai	Sendai, Japan	1 (1, 1)	36	2		
32	Fukuoka Double Crazy (Hazuki and Koguma)	May 5, 2024	Stardom Fukuoka Golden Week Tour	Fukuoka, Japan	3	55	2		
33	God's Eye (Syuri and Konami)	June 29, 2024	Stardom in Korakuen Hall	Tokyo, Japan	1 (2, 3)	24	0		
34	Oedo Tai/H.A.T.E. Supreme (Momo Watanabe and Thekla)	July 23, 2024	Stardom Nighter in Korakuen II	Tokyo, Japan	1 (3, 1)	159	1	Oedo Tai would disband at Stardom Sapporo World Rendezvous on July 28, 2024. Watanabe and Thekla transferred to the newly created stable of H.A.T.E. and competed under its banner ever since.	
35	wing★gori (Hanan and Saya Iida)	December 29, 2024	Dream Queendom 2024	Tokyo, Japan	1 (1, 1)	207	5		
36	BMI2000 (Natsuko Tora and Ruaka)	July 24, 2025	Nighter in Korakuen	Tokyo, Japan	1 (2, 1)	276	5		
37	02line (AZM and Miyu Amasaki)	April 26, 2026	All Star Grand Queendom	Yokohama, Japan	1	210+	3		

== Combined reigns ==
As of November 22, 2026

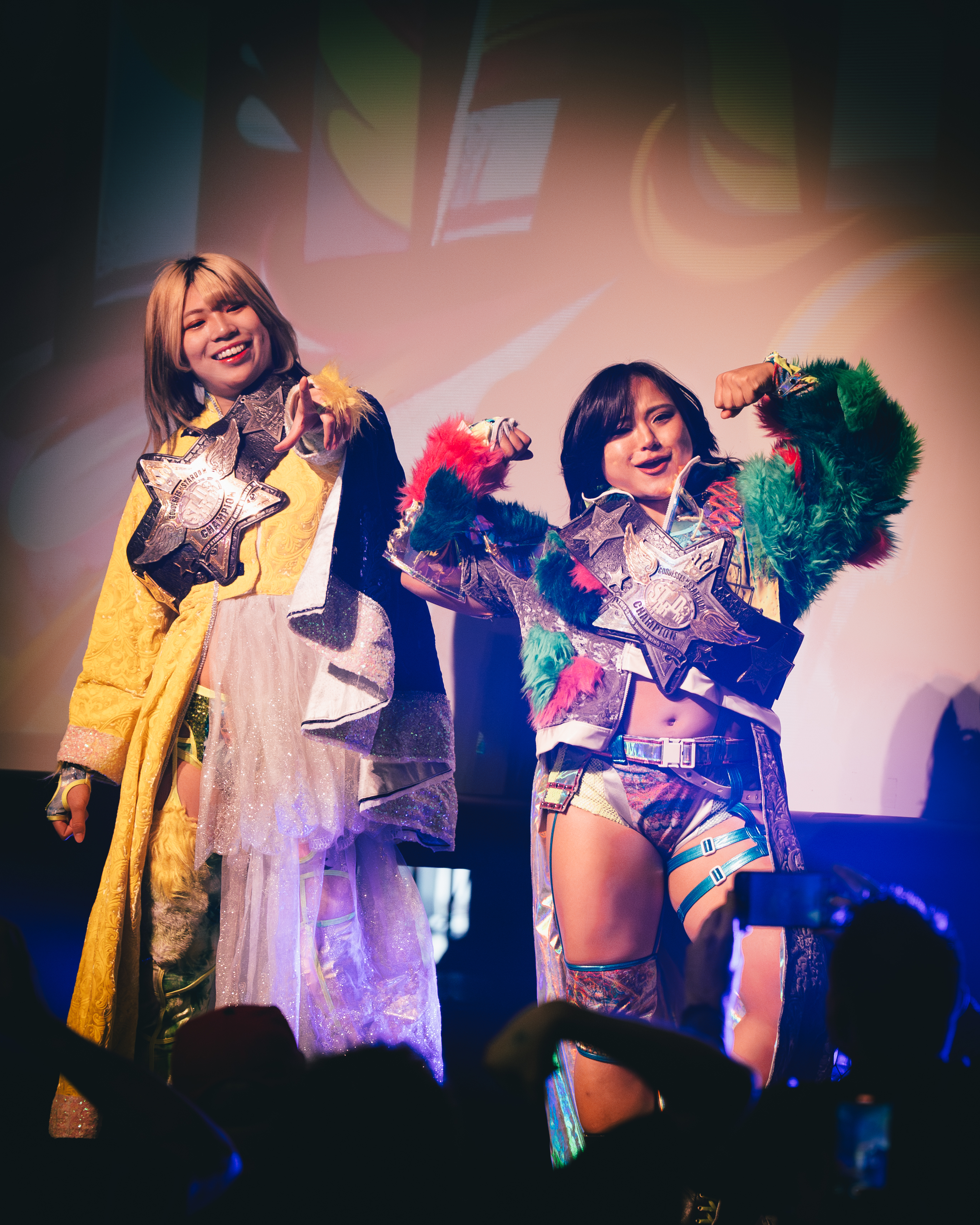
The former champions wing★gori (Hanan (left) and Saya Iida (right)).

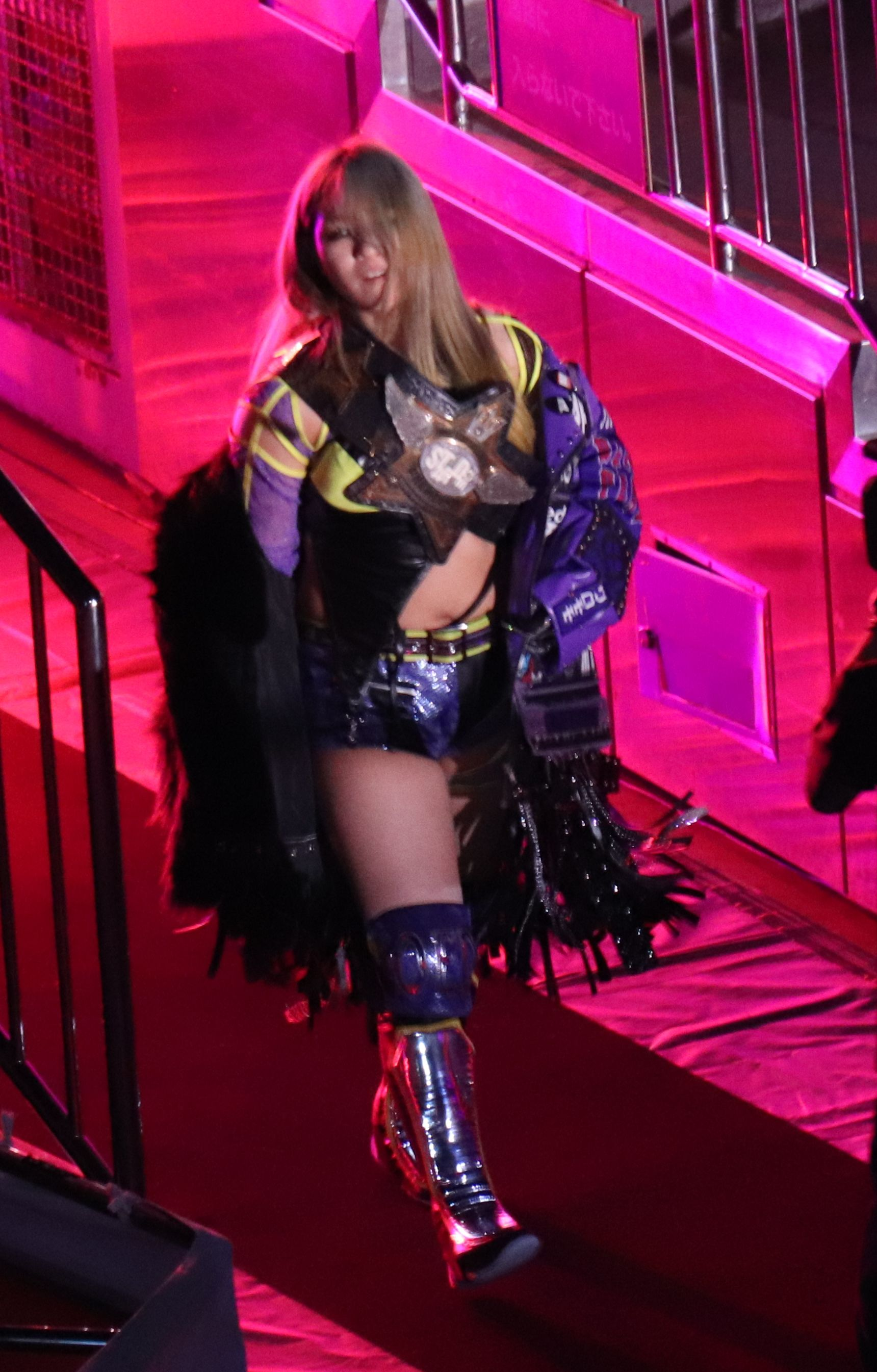
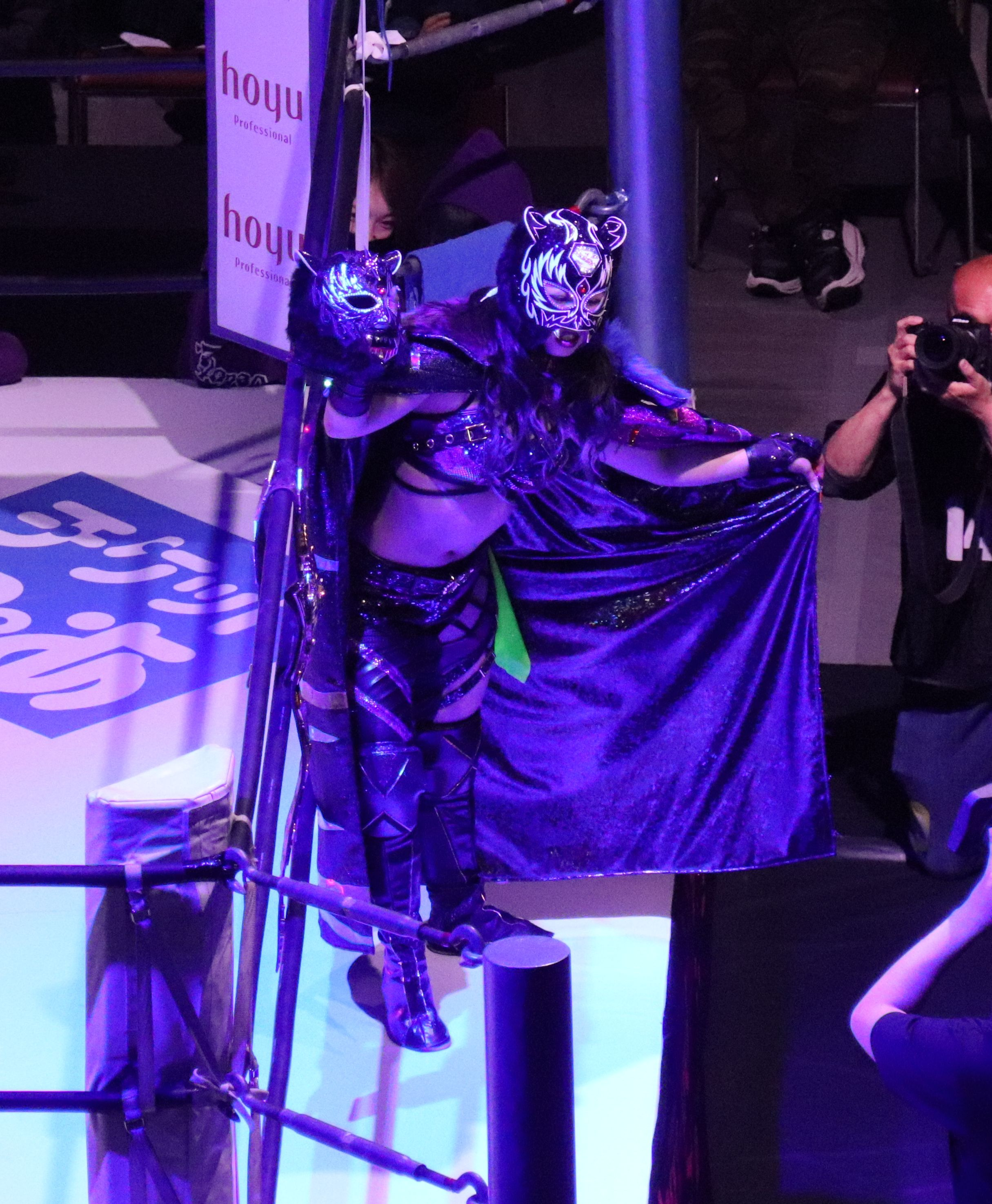
Former champions Black Desire (Momo Watanabe (left) and Starlight Kid (right)).
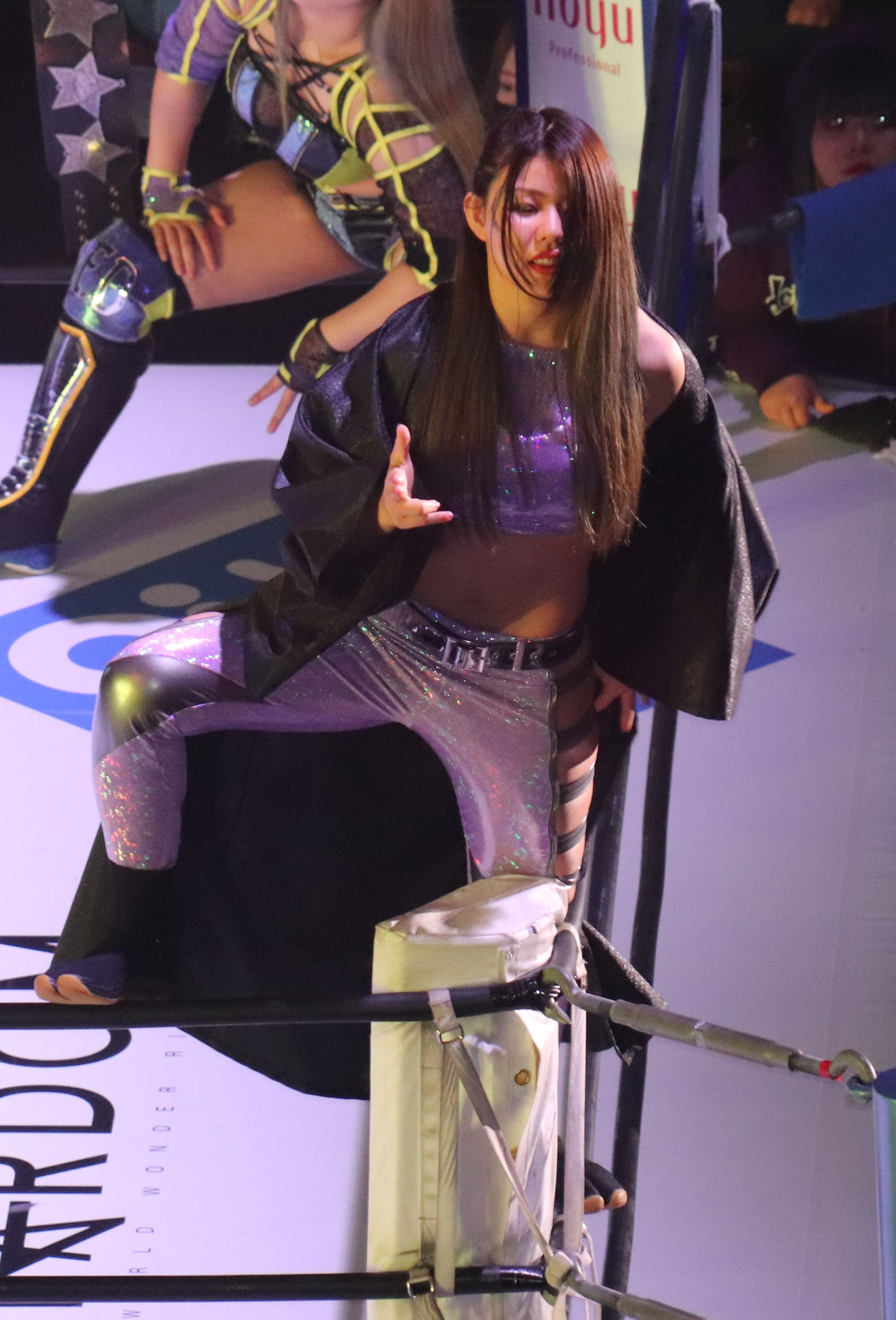
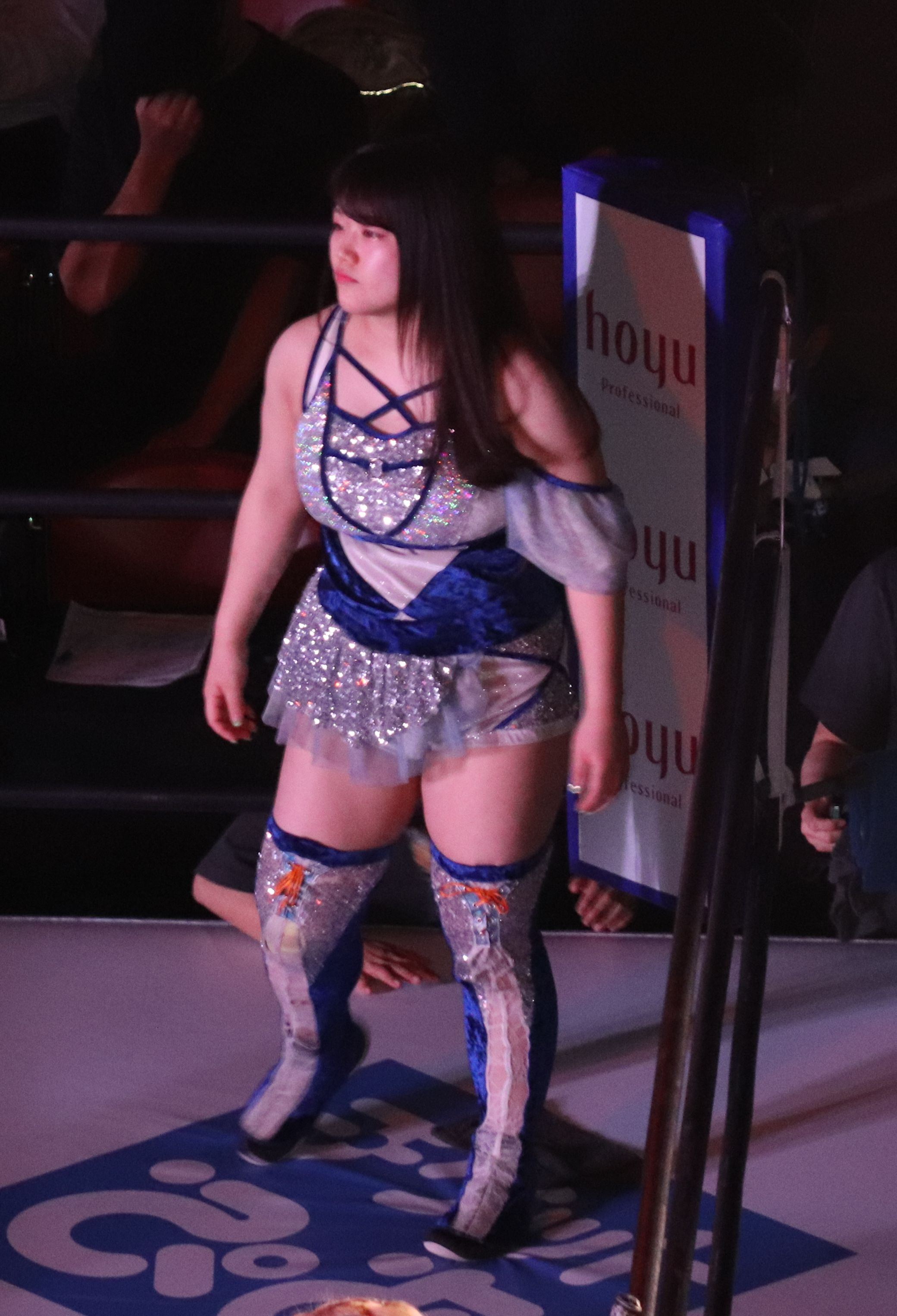
Record three-time champions as a team, FWC (Hazuki (left) and Koguma (right)).

†	Indicates the current champions

=== By team ===
Rank	Team	No. of reigns	Combined defenses	Combined days
1	Thunder Rock (Io Shirai and Mayu Iwatani)	1	11	407
2	Oedo Tai (Hana Kimura and Kagetsu)	1	8	347
3	BY Hou (Yoko Bito and Yuzuki Aikawa)	1	2	311
4	Donna Del Mondo/Alto Livello Kabaliwan (Giulia and Syuri)	1	4	280
5	BMI2000 (Natsuko Tora and Ruaka)	1	5	276
6	AphroditE (Saya Kamitani and Utami Hayashishita)	2	3	272
7	7Kairi (Kairi Hojo and Nanae Takahashi)	1	3	261
8	Fukuoka Double Crazy (Hazuki and Koguma)	3	8	239
9	Queen's Quest (Momo Watanabe and Utami Hayashishita)	1	6	234
10	02line † (AZM and Miyu Amasaki)	1	3	210+
11	wing★gori (Hanan and Saya Iida)	1	5	207
12	Kimura Monster-gun (Alpha Female and Kyoko Kimura)	1	3	196
13	Nanamiho (Miho Wakizawa and Nanae Takahashi)	1	1	195
14	Oedo Tai (Kagetsu and Kyoko Kimura)	1	2	189
15	Tokyo Cyber Squad (Jungle Kyona and Konami)	1	3	188
16	Oedo Tai (Bea Priestley and Jamie Hayter)	1	1	183
17	Oedo Tai/H.A.T.E. Supreme (Momo Watanabe and Thekla)	1	1	159
18	meltear (Natsupoi and Tam Nakano)	1	2	130
19	Stars (Mayu Iwatani and Saki Kashima)	1	3	119
20	7Upp (Nanae Takahashi and Yuu)	1	2	115
21	Kawasaki Katsushika Saikyou Densetsu (Natsuki☆Taiyo and Yoshiko)	1	3	112
22	Team Jungle (Hiroyo Matsumoto and Jungle Kyona)	1	2	108
23	REStart (Natsupoi and Saori Anou)	1	1	99
24	BY Hou (Kairi Hojo and Yoko Bito)	1	1	73
25	The New Eras (Ami Sourei and Mirai)	1	2	63
26	J.A.N. (Jungle Kyona and Natsuko Tora)	1	0	54
27	Oedo Tai (Bea Priestley and Konami)	1	1	50
28	MaiHime (Himeka and Maika)	1	2	49
28	Rose Gold (Mariah May and Mina Shirakawa)	1	1	49
30	Kimura Monster-gun (Hailey Hatred and Kyoko Kimura)	1	0	43
31	Black Desire (Momo Watanabe and Starlight Kid)	1	1	40
32	Crazy Star (Suzu Suzuki and Mei Seira)	1	2	36
33	Ho-Show Tennyo (Kairi Hojo and Natsumi Showzuki)	1	0	34
34	God's Eye (Syuri and Konami)	1	0	24

=== By wrestler ===
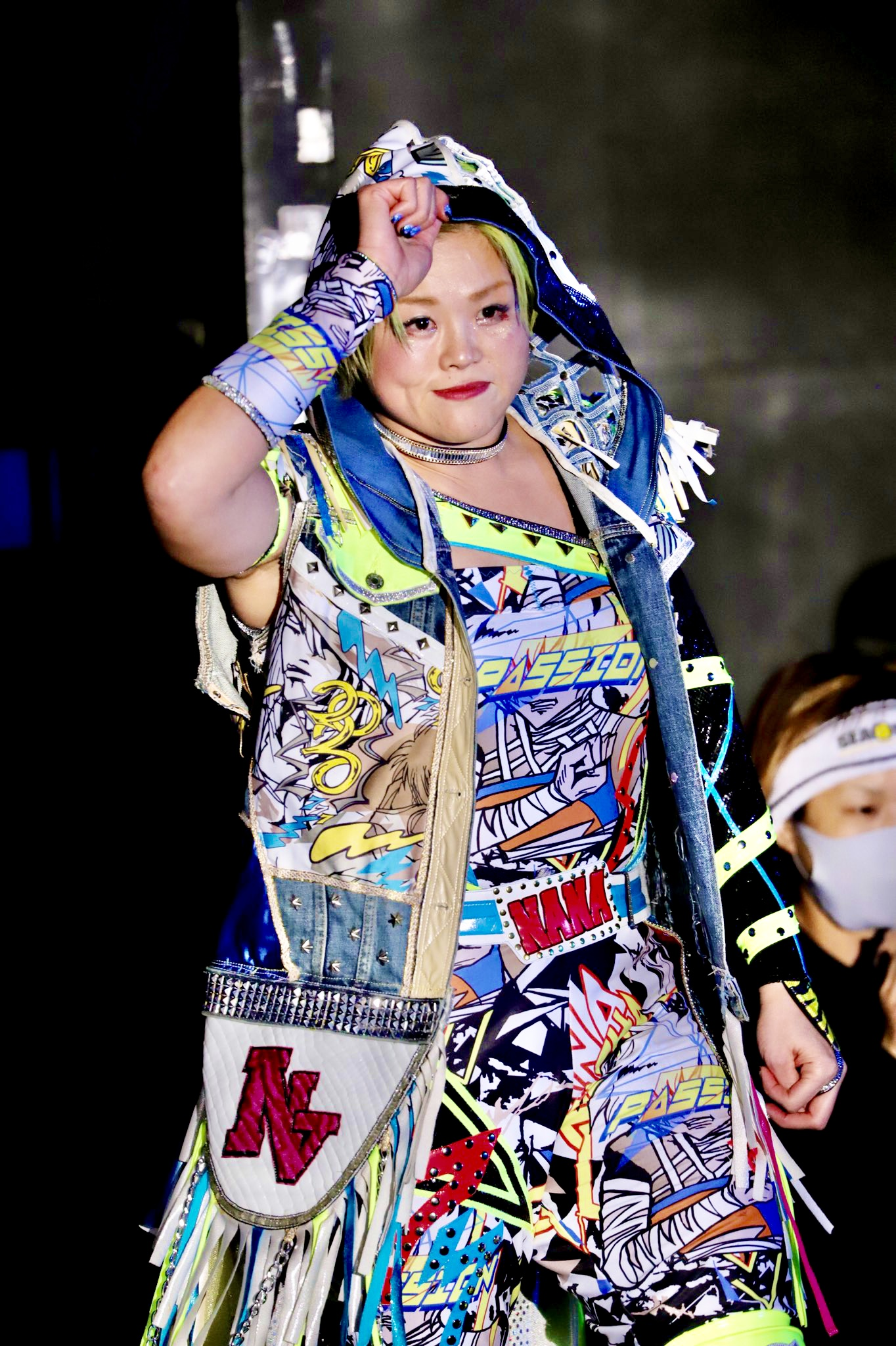
Nanae Takahashi holds the record for the longest combined days as champion at 571.

Rank	Wrestler	No. of reigns	Combined defenses	Combined days
1	Nanae Takahashi	3	5	571
2	Kagetsu	2	11	536
3	Mayu Iwatani	2	15	526
4	Utami Hayashishita	3	9	506
5	Momo Watanabe	3	8	433
6	Kyoko Kimura	3	5	428
7	Io Shirai	1	11	407
8	Yoko Bito	2	3	384
9	Kairi Hojo	3	4	368
10	Jungle Kyona	3	5	350
11	Hana Kimura	1	8	347
11	Yuzuki Aikawa	1	2	347
13	Natsuko Tora	2	5	330
14	Syuri	2	4	304
15	Giulia	1	4	280
16	Ruaka	1	5	276
17	Saya Kamitani	2	3	272
18	Konami	3	4	262
19	Hazuki	3	8	239
19	Koguma	3	8	239
21	Bea Priestley	2	2	233
22	Natsupoi	2	3	229
23	AZM †	1	3	210+
23	Miyu Amasaki †	1	3	210+
25	Hanan	1	5	207
25	Saya Iida	1	5	207
27	Alpha Female	1	3	196
28	Miho Wakizawa	1	1	195
29	Jamie Hayter	1	1	183
30	Thekla	1	1	159
31	Tam Nakano	1	2	130
32	Saki Kashima	1	3	119
33	Yuu	1	2	115
34	Natsuki☆Taiyo	1	3	112
34	Yoshiko	1	3	112
36	Hiroyo Matsumoto	1	2	108
37	Saori Anou	1	1	99
38	Mirai	1	2	63
38	Ami Sourei	1	2	63
40	Himeka	1	2	49
40	Maika	1	2	49
40	Mina Shirakawa	1	2	49
40	Mariah May	1	2	49
44	Hailey Hatred	1	0	43
45	Starlight Kid	1	1	40
46	Suzu Suzuki	1	2	36
46	Mei Seira	1	2	36
48	Natsumi Showzuki	1	0	34

== See also ==
- Princess Tag Team Championship
- International Ribbon Tag Team Championship
- NXT Women's Tag Team Championship
- WWE Women's Tag Team Championship
- Oz Academy Tag Team Championship
- Wave Tag Team Championship
- Women's World Tag Team Championship
