= Hanan (wrestler) =

Japanese professional wrestler

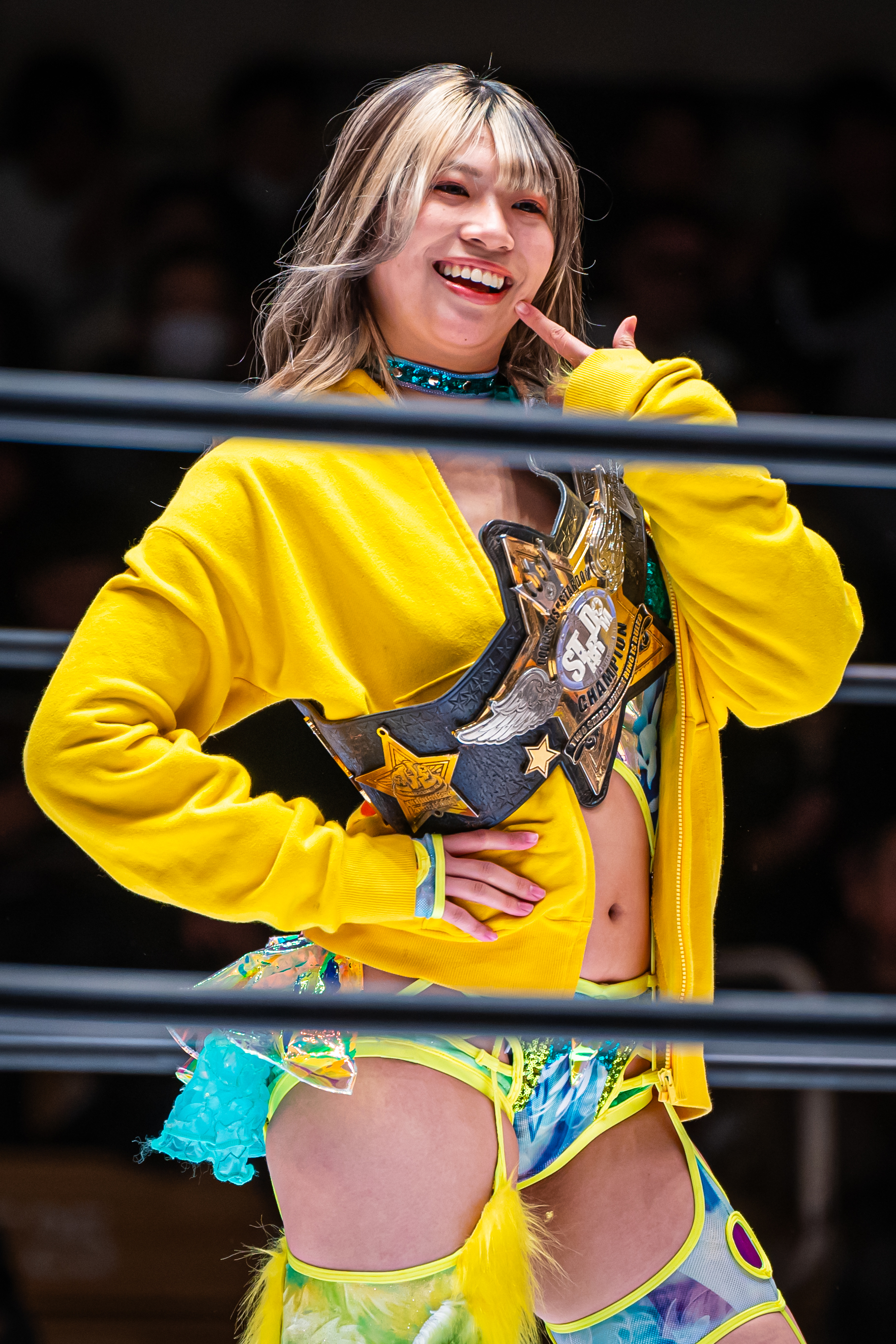
- Hanan as one half of the Goddesses of Stardom Champions in January 2025

Personal information
- Born: August 11, 2004 (age 21) Shimotsuke, Tochigi, Japan
- Relatives: Hina (sister); Rina (sister)

Professional wrestling career
- Ring name(s): Hanan; Nyanki
- Billed height: 168 cm (5 ft 6 in)
- Billed weight: 59 kg (130 lb)
- Trained by: Fuka; Mayu Iwatani
- Debut: April 9, 2017

Hanan (羽南; born August 11, 2004) is a Japanese professional wrestler. She is signed to World Wonder Ring Stardom, where she is the current Wonder of Stardom Champion in her first reign and the leader of the Stars stable.

== Professional wrestling career ==
=== World Wonder Ring Stardom (2017–present) ===
Hanan made her professional wrestling debut under the ring name Hanan at the age of 13, on April 9, 2017, where she fell short to Ruaka. At Mask Fiesta 2018 on October 28, 2018, Hanan, under the ring name Nyanki, teamed up with Pinya and Rinya in a loss to Cello de la Bellano, Shiki Melody and Starlight Kid.

At the 2021 Goddesses of Stardom Tag League, Hanan teamed up with Rina as Water and Oil and competed in the Red Goddess block, scoring a total of two points. At Dream Queendom on December 29, 2021, Hanan won the first title of her career, the Future of Stardom Championship, by defeating Ruaka.

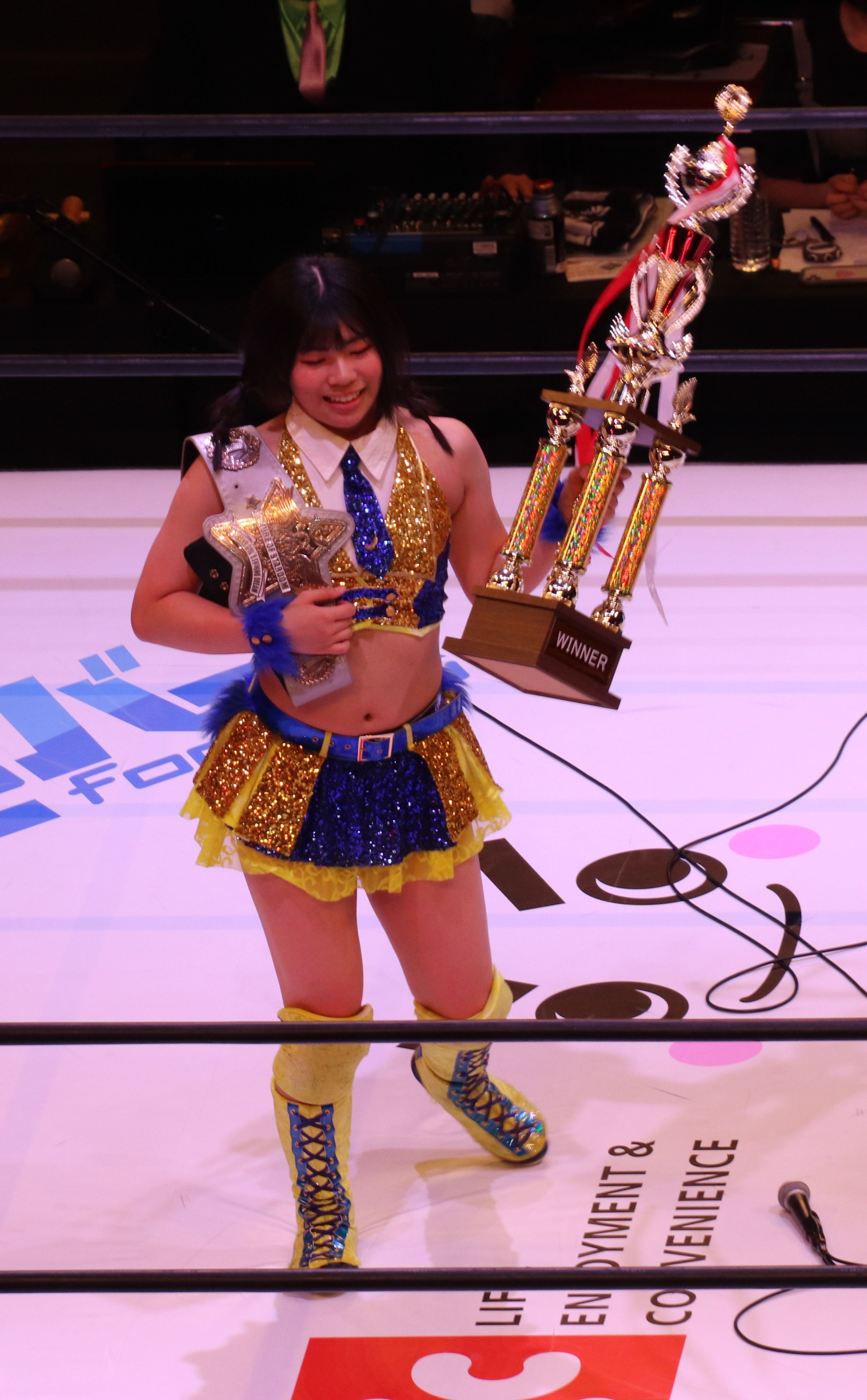
Hanan as the Future of Stardom Champion at Stardom World Climax 2022

At Nagoya Supreme Fight on January 29, 2022, Hanan successfully defended the Future of Stardom Championship for the first time against Lady C. Hanan scored the second successful defense of the title at Cinderella Journey on February 23 where she defeated fellow stablemate Momo Kohgo. Hanan defended the future title successfully two times on both of nights of the World Climax 2022, first against Rina on March 26, and second against Mai Sakurai on March 27. On October 19, at New Blood 5, Hanan lost the Future of Stardom Championship to Ami Sohrei, ending her reign at 294 days.

At New Blood 11 on September 29, 2023, Hanan and Saya Iida, together as wing★gori, became the New Blood Tag Team Champions by defeating Bloody Fate.

== Personal life ==
Hanan is the older sister of fellow wrestlers Rina and Hina, who both also compete in World Wonder Ring Stardom.

== Championships and accomplishments ==
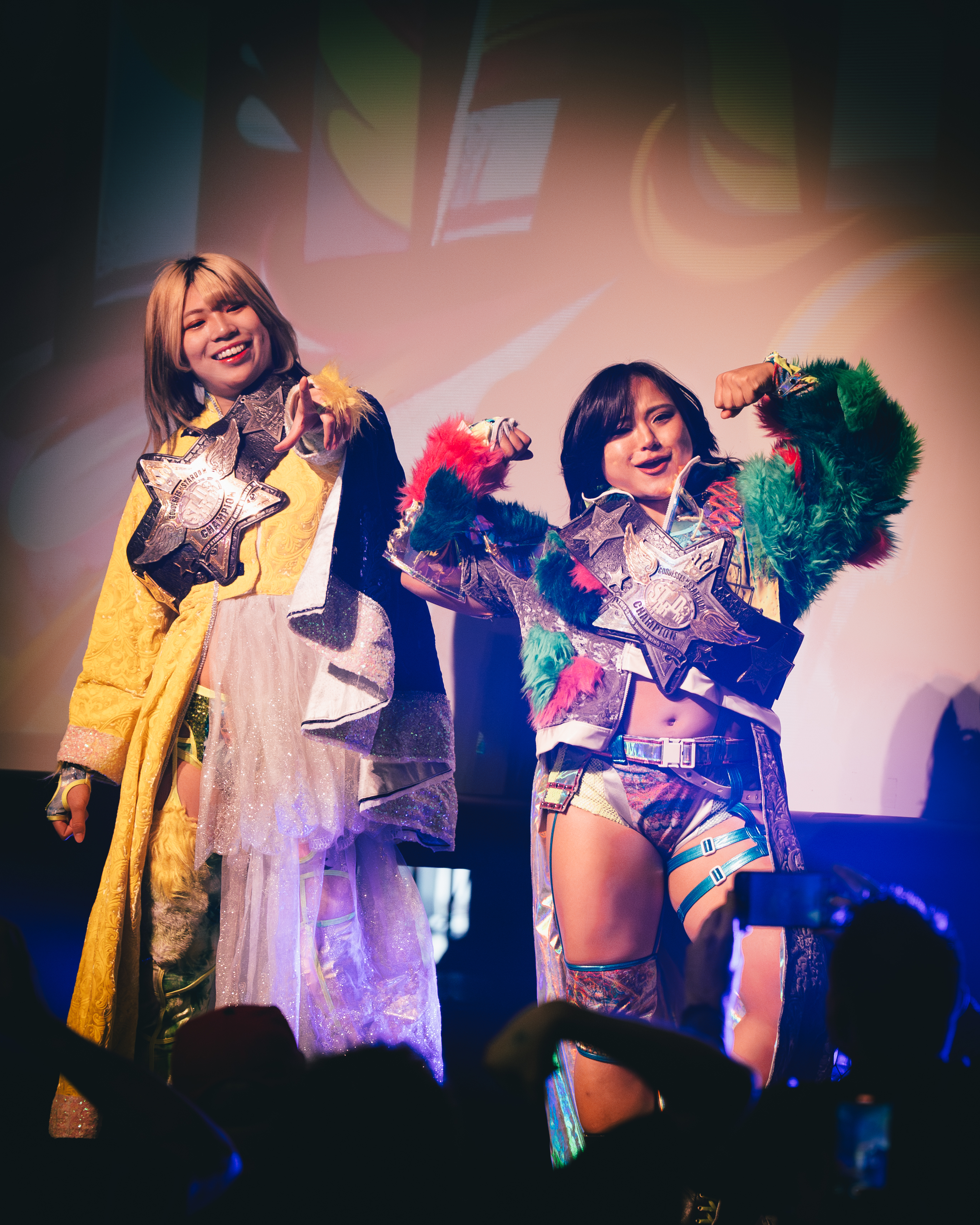
Hanan with wing★gori tag team partner Saya Iida as the Goddesses of Stardom Champions.

- Pro Wrestling Illustrated
  - Ranked No. 50 of the top 250 female wrestlers in the PWI Women's 250 in 2024
- World Wonder Ring Stardom
  - Wonder of Stardom Championship (1 time, current)
  - Future of Stardom Championship (1 time)
  - New Blood Tag Team Championship (1 time) – with Saya Iida
  - Goddesses of Stardom Championship (1 time) – with Saya Iida
  - Goddesses of Stardom Tag League (2024) – with Saya Iida
  - Stardom Cinderella Tournament (2024, 2026)
  - Stardom Year-End Awards (2 times)
    - Best Unit Award (2022) as part of Stars
    - Best Tag Team Award (2024) – with Saya Iida
  - 5★Star GP Award (1 time)
    - 5★Star GP Outstanding Performance Award (2024)
