= Stardom The Conversion =

2024 World Wonder Ring Stardom event

- Promotional poster of the event
- Promotion: World Wonder Ring Stardom
- Date: June 22, 2024
- City: Tokyo, Japan
- Venue: Yoyogi National Gymnasium
- Attendance: 1,654

Event chronology
← Previous; New Blood 13	Next → Sapporo World Rendezvous

The Conversion chronology
← Previous; First	Next → 2025

Stardom The Conversion (スターダム・ザ・コンバージョン, Sutādamu za konbājon) was a professional wrestling event promoted by World Wonder Ring Stardom. The event took place on June 22, 2024, in Tokyo at Yoyogi National Gymnasium.

Nine matches were contested at the event, including one on the pre-show, and three of Stardom's ten championships were on the line. The main event saw Maika defeat Xena to retain the World of Stardom Championship. In another prominent match, Sendai Girls' Pro Wrestling's Mika Iwata defeated Saori Anou to win the Wonder of Stardom Championship.

== Production ==
=== Background ===
The show featured professional wrestling matches that result from scripted storylines, where wrestlers portray villains, heroes, or less distinguishable characters in the scripted events that build tension and culminate in a wrestling match or series of matches.

=== Event ===
The event started with the preshow singles confrontation between Rian and Fukigen Death solded with the victory of the latter. In the second match, Hazuki and Koguma defeated stablemates and New Blood Tag Team Champions Hanan and Saya Iida to secure the second consecutive defense of the Goddess of Stardom Championship in that respective reign. After the bout concluded, Hazuki and Koguma nominated Syuri and Konami as their next challengers in a match which was set to occur one week after the event. The third bout saw Starlight Kid picking up a victory over Mei Seira in singles competition. All the three first matches were broadcast live on Stardom's YouTube channel.

The fourth match saw one third of the Artist of Stardom Champions Mina Shirakawa and Hanako outmatching Natsupoi and Yuna Mizumori in tag team competition. Next up, Saki Kashima, Ranna Yagami and Tomoka Inaba) defeated Tam Nakano, Sakura Aya and Kurara Sayaka in six-way tag team action. Next up, IWGP Women's Champion Mayu Iwatani and Momo Kohgo wrestled into a time-limit draw against Syuri and Ami Sohrei. In the seventh bout, Natsuko Tora, Thekla, Rina, Momo Watanabe and Ruaka defeated Saya Kamitani, AZM, Lady C, Hina and Miyu Amasaki in a Ten-woman elimination tag team match. Per the stipulation, since Kamitani was the last wrestler eliminated, AZM, Hina, Lady C, and Amasaki all had to leave Queen's Quest, assenting Kamitani to remain the sole member of the unit in the process, thus taking the leadership of the stable. After the bout concluded, the whole God's Eye unit and Crazy Star's Suzu Suzuki, Mei Seira and their newest member Starlight Kid tried to make a joining offer to the rest of the ex-Queen's Quest's members but the latters declined. In the semi main event, Sendai Girls' Pro Wrestling's Mika Iwata defeated Saori Anou to win the Wonder of Stardom Championship, ending the latter's reign at 176 days and three defenses. Iwata became the first wrestler not signed by Stardom to win one of the two main singles titles in the promotion since Santana Garrett back in 2015.

In the main event, Maika defeated Empress Nexus Venus stablemate Xena to secure the fifth defense of the World of Stardom Championship in that respective reign. After the bout concluded, Maika received a challenge from JTO's Tomoka Inaba.

== Results ==
No.	Results	Stipulations	Times
1^{P}	Fukigen Death defeated Rian by pinfall	Singles match	4:33
2	Fukuoka Double Crazy (Hazuki and Koguma) (c) defeated wing★gori (Hanan and Saya Iida) by pinfall	Tag team match for the Goddess of Stardom Championship	19:23
3	Starlight Kid defeated Mei Seira by pinfall	Singles match	13:23
4	Empress Nexus Venus (Mina Shirakawa and Hanako) defeated Cosmic Double Fairy (Natsupoi and Yuna Mizumori) by pinfall	Tag team match	11:17
5	God's Eye (Saki Kashima, Ranna Yagami and Tomoka Inaba) defeated Cosmic Angels (Tam Nakano, Aya Sakura and Sayaka Kurara) by pinfall	Six-woman tag team match	11:51
6	Stars (Mayu Iwatani and Momo Kohgo) vs. God's Eye (Syuri and Ami Sohrei) ended in a time-limit draw	Tag team match	15:00
7	Oedo Tai (Natsuko Tora, Thekla, Rina, Momo Watanabe and Ruaka) defeated Queen's Quest (Saya Kamitani, AZM, Lady C, Hina and Miyu Amasaki) by pinfall	Ten-woman elimination tag team match Per the stipulation, since Kamitani was the last wrestler eliminated, AZM, Hina, Lady C, and Amasaki all had to leave Queen's Quest.	27:29
8	Mika Iwata defeated Saori Anou (c) by pinfall	Singles match for the Wonder of Stardom Championship	21:08
9	Maika (c) defeated Xena by pinfall	Singles match for the World of Stardom Championship	22:27
(c) / – the champion(s) heading into the match; P / – the match was broadcast on the pre-show
