= Unagi Sayaka =

Japanese professional wrestler

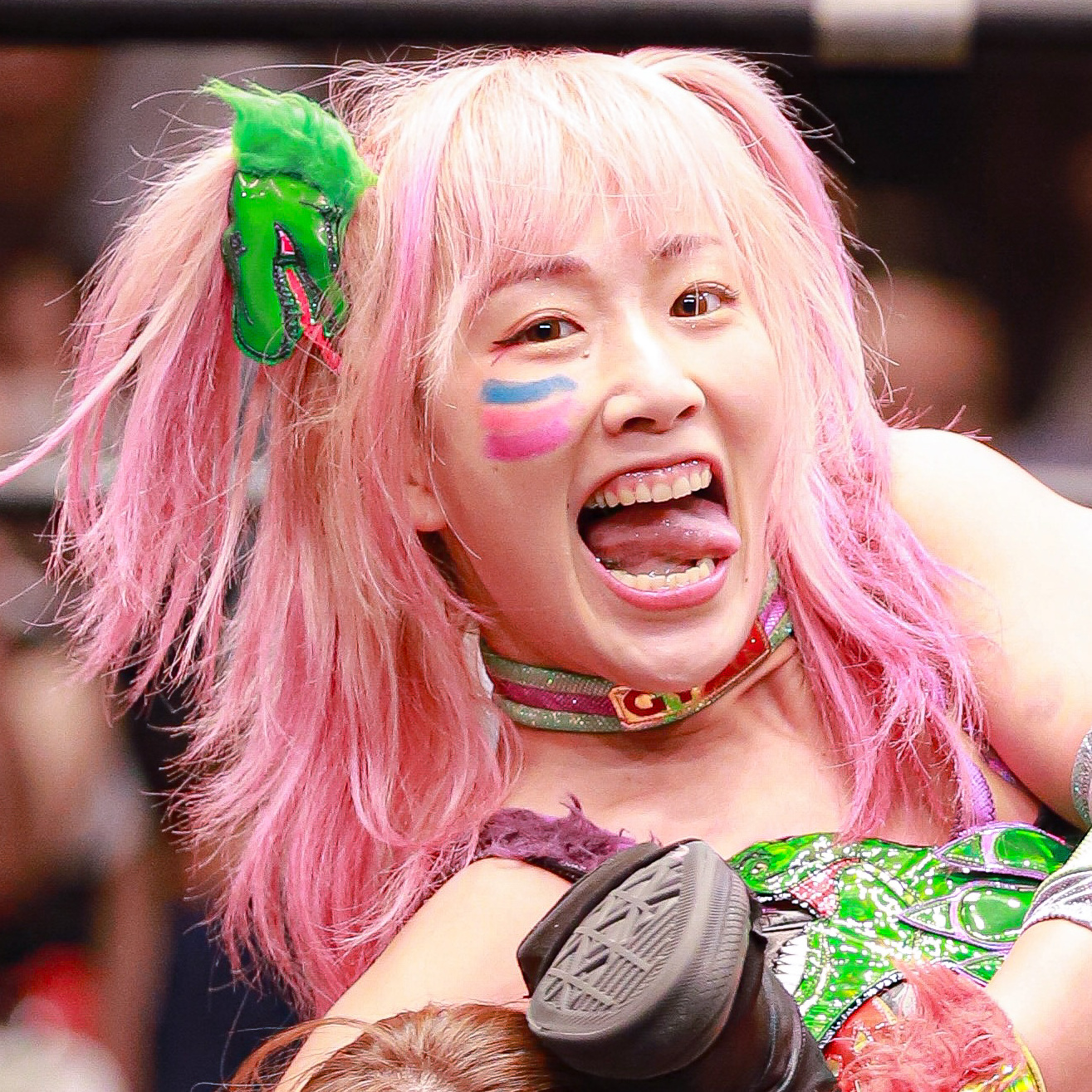
- Sayaka in 2023

Personal information
- Born: September 2, 1986 (age 39) Toyonaka, Osaka, Japan
- Website: https://unagisayaka.com

Professional wrestling career
- Ring names: Himawari Unagi; Ichigo Sayaka; Sayaka Unagi; Unagi Sayaka
- Billed height: 168 cm (5 ft 6 in)
- Billed weight: 54 kg (119 lb)
- Trained by: Tokyo Joshi Pro Wrestling
- Debut: 2019

Unagi Sayaka (ウナギ・サヤカ, Sayaka Unagi; born September 2, 1986) is a Japanese professional wrestler working as a freelancer.

She is best known for her time with World Wonder Ring Stardom, where she was a founding member of Cosmic Angels and is a former Artist of Stardom Champion and Future of Stardom Champion. In the Japanese independent scene, she worked for promotions such as Tokyo Joshi Pro-Wrestling (TJPW), All Japan Pro-Wrestling (AJPW), Gleat, Marvelous, Pro Wrestling Zero1 and Diana.

== Professional wrestling career ==
=== Tokyo Joshi Pro Wrestling (2019–2020) ===
Unagi made her professional wrestling debut under the name Himawari Unagi on January 4 at the TJPW Tokyo Joshi Pro '19 show by teaming up with Saki Akai to face the team of Yumi and Yuki Kamifuku. During her tenure with Tokyo Joshi Pro Wrestling she fought as a singles wrestler and competed against other well-known wrestlers such as Yuka Sakazaki at TJP Pinano Pipipipi Graduation Special on April 5, 2019, Maki Itoh at TJPW Tokyo Princess Cup on August 8, 2020, or Miyu Yamashita.

Unagi, like many TJPW wrestlers, has also wrestled for parent promotion DDT Pro-Wrestling, and has appeared at DDT Peter Pan, making her first appearance at Wrestle Peter Pan 2019 on July 15, where she teamed up with Natsumi Maki and Yuna Manase in a losing effort to Rika Tatsumi and The Bakuretsu Sisters (Nodoka Tenma and Yuki Aino).

=== World Wonder Ring Stardom (2020–2022) ===
==== Cosmic Angels (2020–2025) ====
Unagi debuted in World Wonder Ring Stardom on November 14, 2020, at the Korakuen New Landscape Event teaming up with Tam Nakano and Mina Shirakawa, as the newest member of Cosmic Angels, defeating Stars (Gokigen Death, Mayu Iwatani and Starlight Kid). She began her tenure with Stardom as a tag team wrestler, and worked against different stables such as Donna Del Mondo (Himeka, Maika and Natsupoi) and Queen's Quest (Momo Watanabe and Saya Kamitani). On December 16, at Road To Osaka Dream Cinderella, Cosmic Angels defeated Oedo Tai (Bea Priestley, Natsuko Tora and Saki Kashima), to win Unagi's first title of her career, the Artist of Stardom Championship. At Stardom Osaka Dream Cinderella 2020 on December 20, they scored their successful title defense against Stars (Gokigen Death, Mayu Iwatani and Starlight Kid).

At Stardom 10th Anniversary Show on January 17, 2021, Unagi unsuccessfully challenged Saya Iida for the Future of Stardom Championship. On March 3, 2021, at All Star Dream Cinderella, Unagi won a 24-person All-Star Rumble featuring wrestlers from the promotion's past, such as Chigusa Nagayo, Kyoko Inoue, Yoko Bito and Yuzuki Aikawa. At Stardom Yokohama Dream Cinderella 2021 on April 4, Unagi fell short to Saya Kamitani in a singles match. On the first night of the Stardom Cinderella Tournament 2021 from April 10, she defeated Natsuko Tora in a Cinderella Tournament First-round match. In the Stardom 5 Star Grand Prix 2021 she fought in the Block B and scored a total of nine points after competing against Syuri, Saya Kamitani, Takumi Iroha, Konami, Utami Hayashishita, Tam Nakano, Maika, AZM and Ruaka. At Stardom 10th Anniversary Grand Final Osaka Dream Cinderella on October 9, 2021, she dropped the Future of Stardom Championship to Ruaka. Unagi participated in the Stardom Super Wars trilogy of events, making her first appearance on November 3, 2021, at Kawasaki Super Wars where she unsuccessfully challenged stablemate Tam Nakano for the Wonder of Stardom Championship. At Tokyo Super Wars on November 27, she teamed up with Lady C in a losing effort against AZM and Momo Watanabe. At Osaka Super Wars, the last event of the trilogy which took place on December 18, Unagi teamed up with Mina Shirakawa and Tam Nakano in a losing effort against Mayu Iwatani, Hazuki and Koguma in a Six-woman tag team match as part of a ¥10 Million Unit tournament. At Stardom Dream Queendom on December 29, 2021, Unagi teamed up with Mai Sakurai and Mina Shirakawa to unsuccessfully challenge MaiHimePoi (Maika, Natsupoi and Himeka) for the Artist of Stardom Championship.

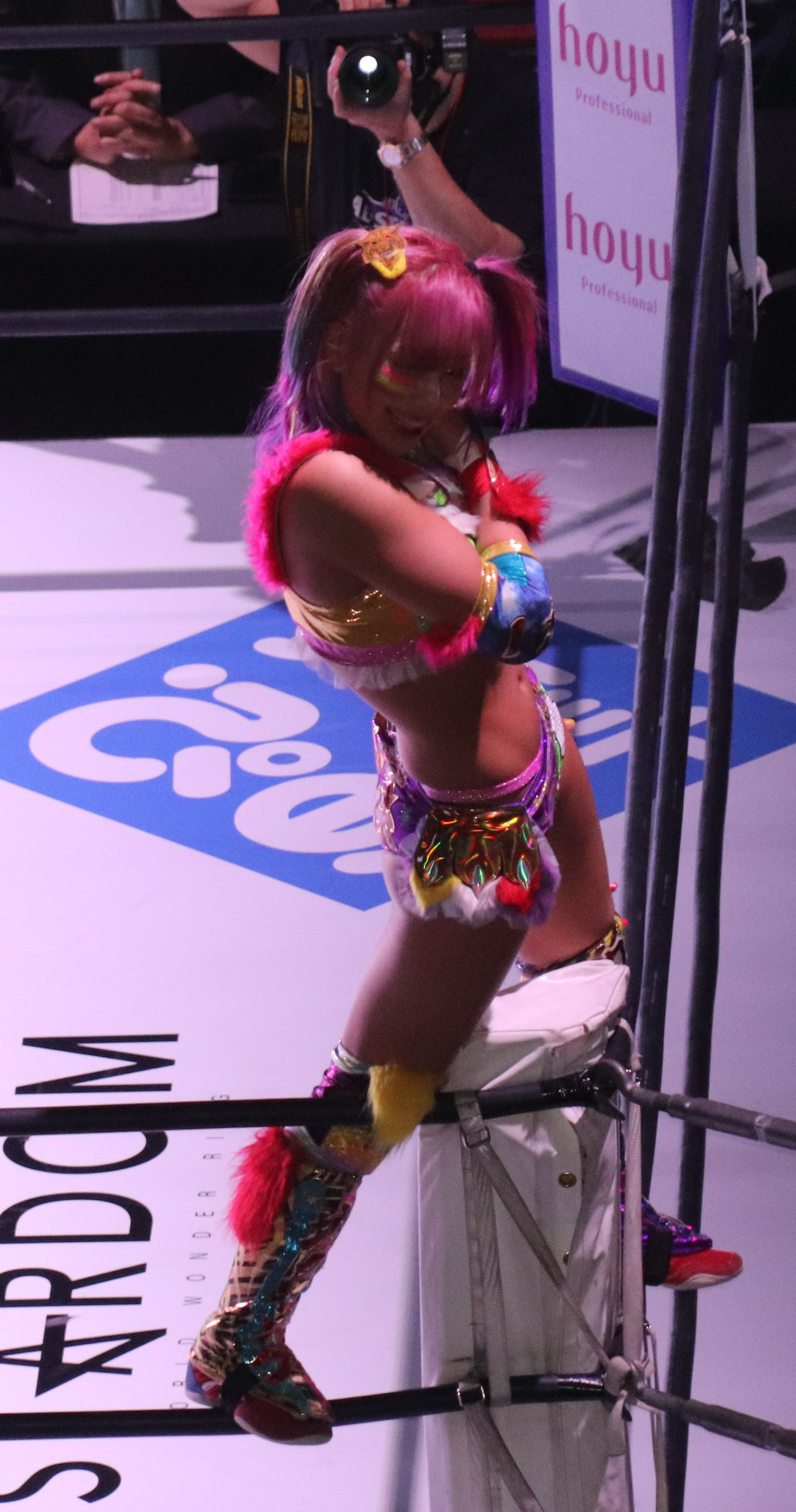
Unagi on the second night of the Stardom World Climax 2022 from March 27.

At Stardom Nagoya Supreme Fight on January 29, 2022, Unagi unsuccessfully challenged Saya Kamitani for the Wonder of Stardom Championship. At Stardom Cinderella Journey on February 23, 2020, Unagi teamed up with Mina Shirakawa to unsuccessfully challenge FWC (Hazuki and Koguma) for the Goddesses of Stardom Championship. At Stardom New Blood 1 on March 11, 2022, she teamed up with Waka Tsukiyama in a losing effort against Marvelous (Maria and Ai Houzan). On the first night of the Stardom World Climax 2022 from March 26, Unagi teamed up with Tam Nakano to unsuccessfully face Mayu Iwatani and a returning Kairi. On the second night from March 27, she participated in a 18-women Cinderella Rumble match won by Mei Suruga and also involving various wrestlers from other promotions such as Tomoka Inaba, Aoi, Haruka Umesaki, Nanami, Yuna Mizumori and others from Stardom. Unagi made it to the second rounds in the Stardom Cinderella Tournament 2022 where she was defeated by Natsupoi on April 10. At Stardom Golden Week Fight Tour on May 5, 2022, Unagi teamed up with Tam Nakano and Mina Shirakawa to defeat Queen's Quest's Utami Hayashishita, AZM & Lady C. At Stardom New Blood 2 on May 13, 2022, she teamed up with Mina Shirakawa and Haruka Umesaki to defeat YoungOED (Starlight Kid, Ruaka and Rina). At Stardom Flashing Champions on May 28, 2022, Unagi teamed up with Mina Shirakawa and Waka Tsukiyama, falling short to Prominence (Suzu Suzuki, Akane Fujita and Mochi Natsumi). At Stardom Fight in the Top on June 26, 2022, she fought in a three-way match won by Ruaka and also involving Lady C. At Stardom New Blood 3 on July 8, 2022, she teamed up with Mina Shirakawa, Yuko Sakurai and Rina Amikura in a losing effort against Oedo Tai (Starlight Kid, Ruaka & Rina) and Haruka Umesaki. At Mid Summer Champions in Tokyo, the first event of the Stardom Mid Summer Champions series which took place on July 9, 2022, she teamed up with Tam Nakano, Mina Shirakawa, Saki and Hikari Shimizu to defeat Donna Del Mondo (Giulia, Maika, Himeka, Natsupoi and Mai Sakurai). At Mid Summer Champions in Nagoya on July 24, she teamed up again with Shirakawa and Shimizu, this time in a three-way match won by Prominence (Risa Sera, Hiragi Kurumi and Suzu Suzuki), and also involving Queen's Quest (Lady C, Hina and Miyu Amasaki). At Stardom in Showcase vol.1 on July 23, 2022, Unagi competed in a comedic Cosmic rules three-way match in which she battled Saki and Mina Shirakawa into a no-contest. At Stardom in Showcase vol.2 on September 25, 2022, she competed in another match of its kind, this time by teaming up with Shirakawa against Saki and Hikari Shimizu, and Tam Nakano and Natsupoi. The match result was again a no contest. At Stardom x Stardom: Nagoya Midsummer Encounter on August 21, 2022, she teamed up with Saki an Shirakawa to unsuccessfully challenge Momo Watanabe, Starlight Kid and Saki Kashima for the Artist of Stardom Championship. At the Stardom 5 Star Grand Prix 2022, Unagi fought in the "Red Stars" block, scoring only four points after competing against Tam Nakao, Himeka, Maika, Risa Sera, AZM, Utami Hayashishita, Koguma, Syuri, Saki Kashima, Saki, Mai Sakura and Momo Kohgo. Sayaka Unagi announced on October 4, 2022, that she has become a temporal free agent. However, Unagi stated that she would remain a member of Cosmic Angels. It was reported that Unagi was however still signed to the company as she was only on an unpaid hiatus. She returned for a one night only show, the Stardom in Showcase vol.3 from November 26, 2022, where she teamed up with Tam Nakano and Natsupoi in a losing effort against Prominence (Hiragi Kurumi, Risa Sera and Suzu Suzuki) as a result of a Six-Woman Hardcore Tag Team Match.

=== Freelancing (2022–present) ===
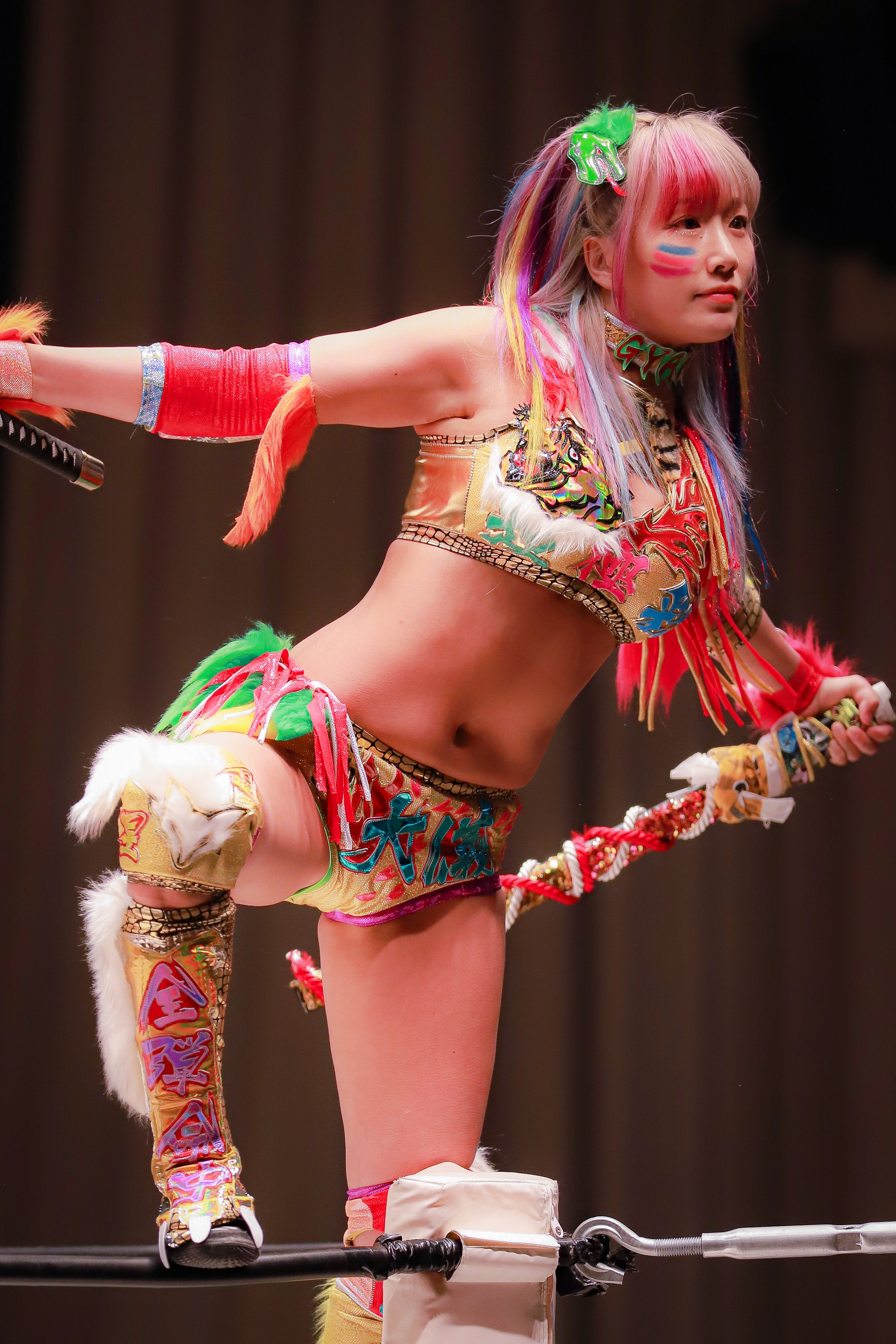
Sayaka in May 2023

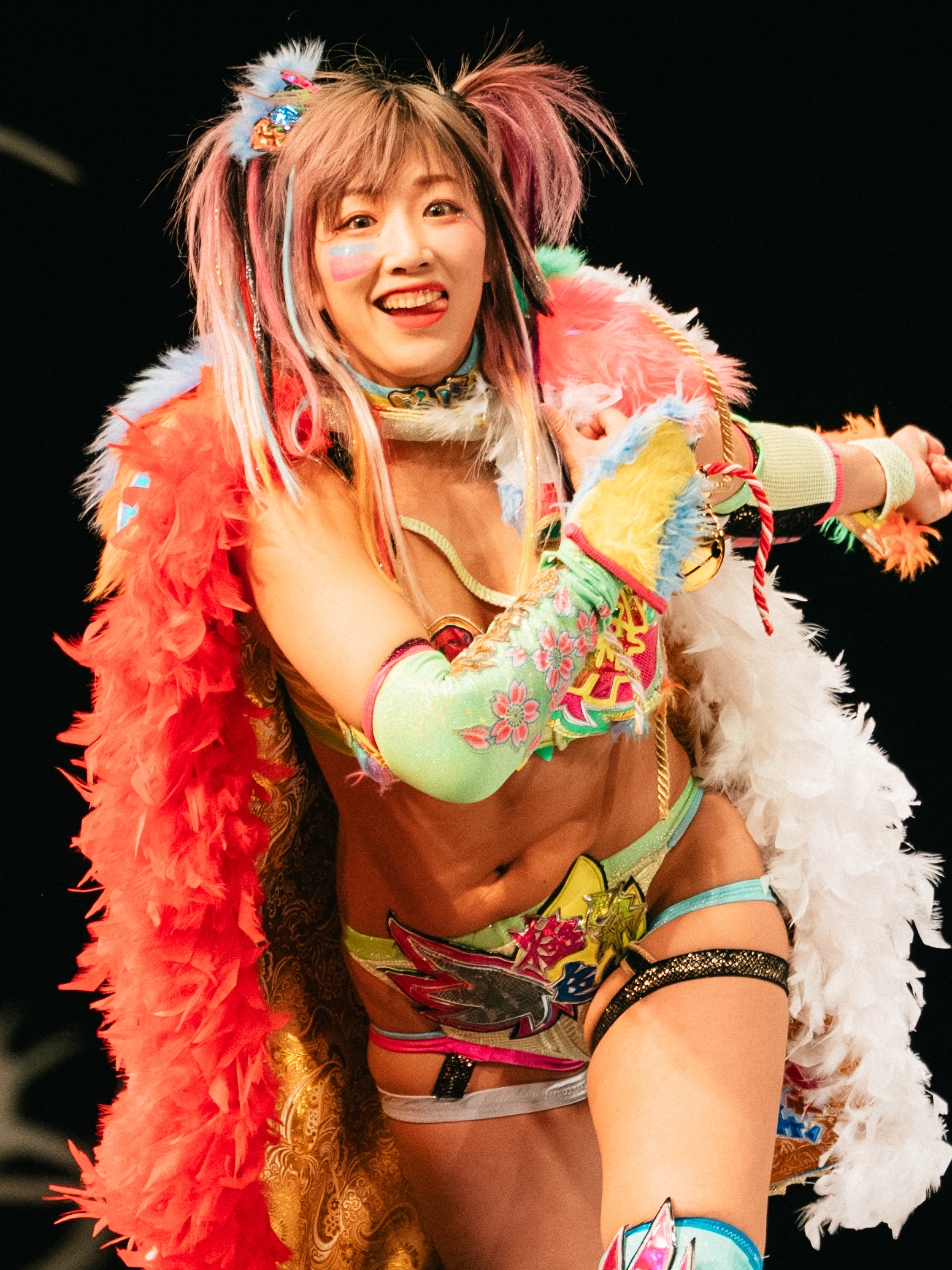
Sayaka in April 2025

After taking a break from Stardom to start a freelance period, Unagi began wandering the Japanese independent circuit. She made her debut in Professional Wrestling Just Tap Out on October 7, 2022, where she defeated Aoi. She was involved in a storyline with Tomoka Inaba as she challenged her for the Queen of JTO Championship. Unagi competed for Marvelous That's Women Pro Wrestling's vacant AAAW Single Championship in a tournament on December 4, 2022, also involving Tomoko Watanabe, Rin Kadokura, Mio Momono, Ai Houzan, Queen Aminata, Maria, Riko Kawahata, Chikayo Nagashima and Yuna Manase. She came out unsuccessfully in the process. She took part in the 2023 edition of Pro Wrestling Zero1's Fire Festival, becoming the first ever female competitor of the tournament and placing herself in the A block where she faced Takuya Sugawara, Junya Matsunaga, Mizuki Watase, Yuko Miyamoto and Masato Tanaka.

=== Sukeban (2023-present) ===
TBA

== Championships and accomplishments ==
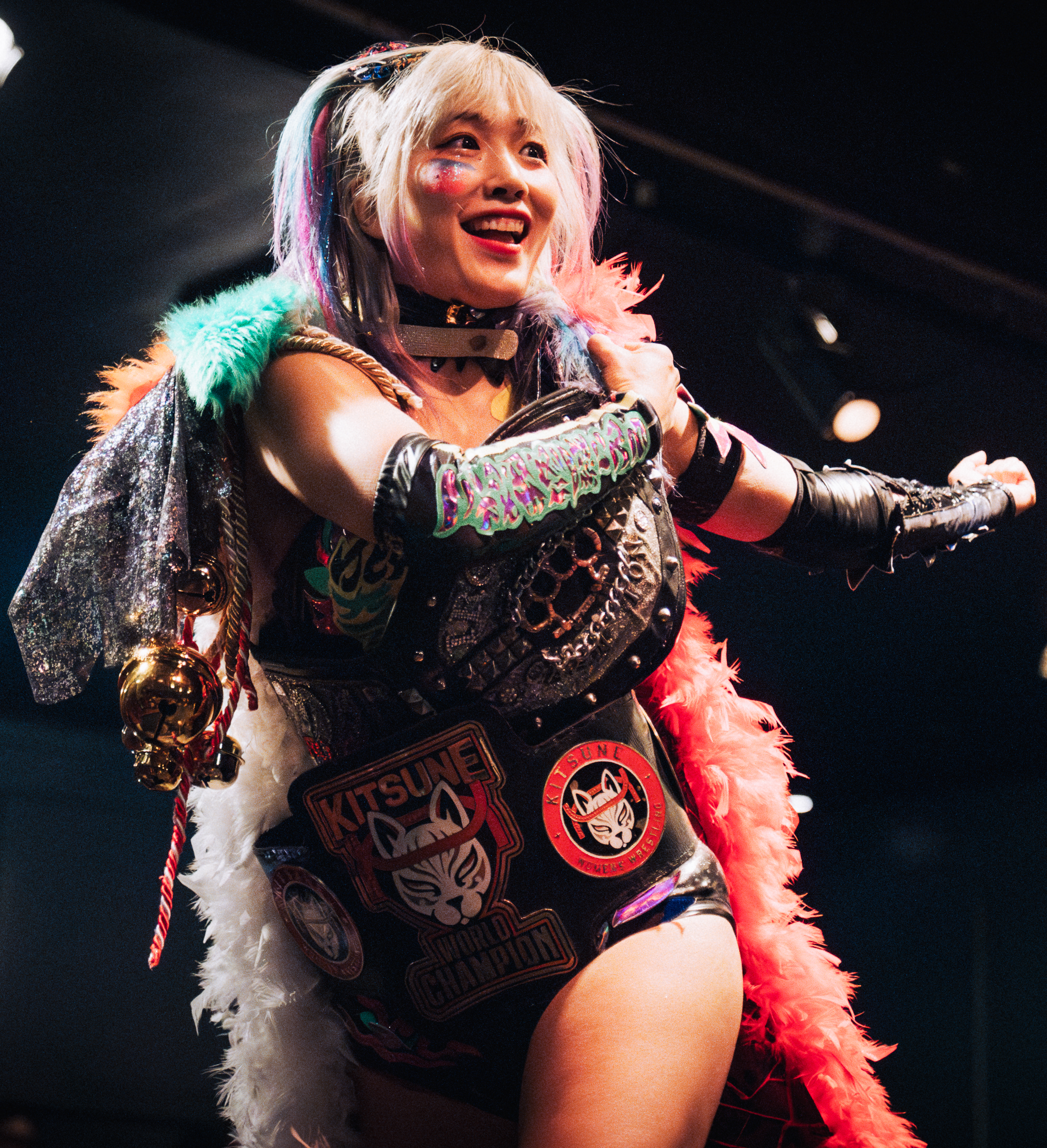
Sayaka as the both Ironman Heavymetalweight Champion and Kitsune World Champion in 2024

- Consejo Mundial de Lucha Libre
  - CMLL Japanese Women's Championship (1 time)
- DDT Pro-Wrestling
  - Ironman Heavymetalweight Championship (12 times)
- Kitsune Women's Wrestling
  - Kitsune World Championship (1 time, inaugural)
- Oz Academy
  - Oz Academy Tag Team Championship (1 time, current) – with Saori Anou
- Pro Wrestling Freedoms
  - Barefoot King Championship (1 time) – with Takashi Sasaki
- Professional Wrestling Just Tap Out
  - JTO Girls Championship (1 time)
- Pro Wrestling Illustrated
  - Ranked No. 71 of the top 250 female wrestlers in the PWI Women's 250 in 2024
- Seadlinnng
  - Beyond the Sea Tag Team Championship (1 time, current) – with Honori Hana
- Sukeban
  - Sukeban World Championship (1 time, current)
- World Woman Pro-Wrestling Diana
  - WWWD Tag Team Championship (1 time) – with Haruka Umesaki
- World Wonder Ring Stardom
  - Artist of Stardom Championship (1 time) – with Tam Nakano and Mina Shirakawa
  - Future of Stardom Championship (1 time)
  - All-Star Rumble (2021)
  - 5★Star GP Award (1 time)
    - 5★Star GP Fighting Spirit Award (2021)
  - Stardom Year-End Award (1 time)
    - Fighting Spirit Award (2021)
