= Stardom Nagoya Supreme Fight =

2022 World Wonder Ring Stardom event

- Promotional poster featuring various Stardom wrestlers
- Promotion: World Wonder Ring Stardom
- Date: January 29, 2022
- City: Nagoya, Japan
- Venue: Aichi Prefectural Gymnasium
- Attendance: 1,306

Event chronology
← Previous; Dream Queendom	Next → Cinderella Journey

Stardom Nagoya Supreme Fight (スターダム名古屋シュプリームファイト, Sutādamu Nagoya shupurīmufaito) was a professional wrestling event promoted by World Wonder Ring Stardom. It took place on January 29, 2022, with a limited attendance due in part to the ongoing COVID-19 pandemic at the time. It was the first pay-per-view of 2022 hosted by the promotion.

== Storylines ==
=== Background ===
The event's press conference where the matches were officially announced took place at the Tokyo Culture Culture venue and was broadcast on Stardom's YouTube channel. The show featured eight professional wrestling matches that resulted from scripted storylines, where wrestlers portrayed villains, heroes, or less distinguishable characters in the scripted events that built tension and culminated in a wrestling match or series of matches.

=== Event ===
The preshow five-way match was broadcast on Stardom's YouTube channel. Stardom announced on their twitter that Waka Tsukiyama, Mai Sakurai and Tam Nakano will miss the show due to bad health condition. After Hanan retained the Future of Stardom Championship over Lady C, her Stars stablemate Momo Kohgo stepped up as her next challenger. Hanan immediately accepted the challenge. Before the third match taking place, Prominence freelance stable wrestlers Risa Sera, Suzu Suzuki, Hiragi Kurumi, Akane Fujita and Mochi Miyagi appeared to the ring and called out Giulia whom they challenged at Stardom World Climax show in March and attacked her. The rest of the Donna Del Mondo stable made the save for Giulia in the process. Even so, the brawl continued backstage. Giulia and Mayu went to a thirty-minute draw. Stardom Executive Producer Rossy Ogawa said that they both receive World of Stardom title matches at Ryōgoku Kokugikan, Giulia on March 26 and Iwatani on March 27. In the main event Syuri successfully defended the World of Stardom Championship for the first time in her first reign against stablemate Mirai. After the match all the Donna Del Mondo members except an injured Natsupoi gathered in the ring to close the show.

== Results ==
No.	Results	Stipulations	Times
1^{P}	Momo Kohgo defeated Fukigen Death, Ruaka, Saki Kashima and Rina	Elimination five-way match	6:37
2	Hanan (c) defeated Lady C	Singles match for the Future of Stardom Championship	5:56
3	Oedo Tai (Momo Watanabe and Starlight Kid) defeated Queen's Quest (Utami Hayashishita and AZM)	Tag team match	9:43
4	Thekla defeated Mina Shirakawa	Singles match for the vacant SWA World Championship	8:57
5	FWC (Hazuki and Koguma) (c) defeated MaiHime (Maika and Himeka)	Tag team match for the Goddesses of Stardom Championship	13:27
6	Saya Kamitani (c) defeated Unagi Sayaka	Singles match for the Wonder of Stardom Championship	18:47
7	Mayu Iwatani vs. Giulia ended in a time-limit draw	Singles match to determine the #1 contender for the World of Stardom Championship	30:00
8	Syuri (c) defeated Mirai	Singles match for the World of Stardom Championship	26:47
(c) / – the champion(s) heading into the match; P / – the match was broadcast on the pre-show
