= Stardom New Blood 2 =

2022 World Wonder Ring Stardom event

New Blood 2
- Promotional poster of the event
- Promotion: World Wonder Ring Stardom
- Date: May 13, 2022
- City: Tokyo, Japan
- Venue: Tokyo New Pier Hall
- Attendance: 338

Event chronology
← Previous; Golden Week Fight Tour	Next → Flashing Champions

New Blood chronology
← Previous; New Blood 1	Next → New Blood 3

Stardom New Blood 2 (スターダムニューブラッド2, Sutādamunyūburaddo 2) was a professional wrestling event promoted by World Wonder Ring Stardom. The event took place on May 13, 2022, in Tokyo, Japan at the Tokyo New Pier Hall, with a limited attendance due in part to the ongoing COVID-19 pandemic at the time.

Six matches were contested at the event, including one on the pre-show. The main event saw Cosmic Angels (Mina Shirakawa and Unagi Sayaka) and Haruka Umesaki defeat YoungOED (Starlight Kid, Ruaka and Rina).

== Event ==
The "New Blood" is a series of events which mainly focus on matches where rookie wrestlers, usually with three or less years of in-ring experience, evolve. Besides wrestlers from Stardom, various superstars from multiple promotions of the Japanese independent scene are invited to compete in bouts that are usually going under the stipulation of singles or tag team matches.

=== Background ===
The show featured a total of six professional wrestling matches that resulted from scripted storylines, where wrestlers portrayed villains, heroes, or less distinguishable characters in the scripted events that built tension and culminated in a wrestling match or series of matches. The press conference for the event was held on April 20, 2022 and was broadcast on Stardom's YouTube channel. The entire event was broadcast on Stardom's YouTube channel.

=== Storylines ===
In the preshow, Gatoh Move Pro Wrestling's Yuna Mizumori picked up a victory against Queen's Quest's Lady C. The next match saw Stars member Hanan teaming up with Queen's Quest's Hina and going into a time-limit draw against JTO's Tomoka Inaba and Aoi. After the match, Aoi issued a challenge for Hanan's Future of Stardom Championship. After Rina Amikura & Yuko Sakurai picked up a victory over Saya Iida and Momo Kohgo, Tam Nakano rushed into the ring to confront Amikura, Sakurai and Saki who accompanied the latter ringside. On June 5, 2022, Cosmic Angels were set to collide with Color's, with the loser unit being forced to join the enemy unit. After Suzu Suzuki defeated Mai Sakurai, she aimed for an attack upon Donna Del Mondo's leader Giulia with whom she has been in a distant feud. Risa Sera and Hiragi Kurumi of Prominence joined Suzuki to attack Giulia. Shortly after that, Syuri rushed to the ring to confront Sera ahead of their World of Stardom Championship match from Stardom Flashing Champions on May 28, 2022. During Giulia and Suzuki's confrontation, Waka Tsukiyama stepped up to challenge Prominence to a six-woman tag team match on May 28. A short backstage segment portrayed Rossy Ogawa handing Miyu Amasaki a portrait of Kairi. It was revealed that Amasaki would team up with Utami Hayashishita against Tam Nakano and Kairi at Flashing Champions.

== Results ==
No.	Results	Stipulations	Times
1^{P}	Yuna Mizumori defeated Lady C	Singles match	7:27
2	Hanan and Hina vs. JTO (Tomoka Inaba and Aoi) ended in a time limit draw	Tag team match	15:00
3	God's Eye (Mirai and Ami Sourei) defeated Waka Tsukiyama and Momoka Hanazono	Tag team match	13:00
4	Color's (Rina Amikura and Yuko Sakurai) defeated Stars (Saya Iida and Momo Kohgo)	Tag team match	11:03
5	Suzu Suzuki defeated Mai Sakurai	Singles match	12:56
6	Cosmic Angels (Mina Shirakawa and Unagi Sayaka) and Haruka Umesaki defeated YoungOED (Starlight Kid, Ruaka and Rina)	Six-woman tag team match	14:36
P / – the match was broadcast on the pre-show
