= Stardom Cinderella Journey =

2022 World Wonder Ring Stardom event

- Promotional poster featuring various Stardom wrestlers
- Promotion: World Wonder Ring Stardom
- Date: February 23, 2022
- City: Nagaoka, Japan
- Venue: City Hall Plaza Aore Nagaoka
- Attendance: 706

Event chronology
← Previous; Nagoya Supreme Fight	Next → New Blood 1

Stardom Cinderella Journey (スターダムシンデレラジャーニー, Sutādamushindererajānī) was a professional wrestling event promoted by World Wonder Ring Stardom. It took place on February 23, 2022, with a limited attendance due in part to the ongoing COVID-19 pandemic at the time.

Eight matches were contested at the event, including two on the pre-show, and four of Stardom's seven championships were on the line. The main event saw Saya Kamitani defeat Natsupoi to retain the Wonder of Stardom Championship. Other top matches included AZM defeating Starlight Kid to win the High Speed Championship, and FWC (Hazuki and Koguma) successfully defended the Goddesses of Stardom Championship against Cosmic Angels (Mina Shirakawa and Unagi Sayaka).

== Storylines ==
=== Background ===
The event's press conference where the matches were officially announced took place on February 4 and was broadcast on Stardom's YouTube channel. The show featured eight professional wrestling matches that resulted from scripted storylines, where wrestlers portrayed villains, heroes, or less distinguishable characters in the scripted events that built tension and culminated in a wrestling match or series of matches.

=== Event ===
The first two pre-show matches were broadcast on Stardom's YouTube channel. In the first one, Mai Sakurai defeated Waka Tsukiyama and Rina in a three-way match to become the number one contender for the Future of Stardom Championship. In the second match, Hanan successfully defended the future title for the second time in her reign against Stars stablemate Momo Kohgo. It was announced that Hanan will defend the title next against Rina on March 26, the first night of the Stardom World Climax 2022. The six-man tag team match between Donna Del Mondo's separate teams of Giulia, Mirai & Thekla and Syuri, Maika & Himeka went down to a 20-minute time-limit draw. Giulia and Syuri had a brief staredown before their confrontation for the World of Stardom Championship on March 26. After Hazuki & Koguma successfully retained the Goddesses of Stardom Championship against Mina Shirakawa & Unagi Sayaka, Momo Watanabe stepped up to challenge them alongside a mystery partner which had to be furtherly revealed. The co-main event had AZM defeating Starlight Kid to win the High Speed Championship for the second time in her career. Kid was humble in defeat and sat in the ring. She did not speak but gestured for AZM to take her mask off too as a victory token. The latter refused to take her mask and instead offered her a fist bump out of respect.

The main event portraited Saya Kamitani successfully defending the Wonder of Stardom Championship against Natsupoi. She named Utami Hayashishita who was at ringside doing guest commentary and Tam Nakano as the next challengers at Stardom World Climax. Her Queen's Quest stablemate will receive her title shot on the first night of the event from March 26 while the Cosmic Angels' unit leader will have it on March 27, the second night.

== Results ==
No.	Results	Stipulations	Times
1^{P}	Mai Sakurai defeated Waka Tsukiyama and Rina by pinfall	Three-way match to determine the #1 contender to the Future of Stardom Championship	8:06
2^{P}	Hanan (c) defeated Momo Kohgo by pinfall	Singles match for the Future of Stardom Championship	5:20
3	Oedo Tai (Momo Watanabe and Ruaka) defeated Queen's Quest (Utami Hayashishita and Lady C) by pinfall	Tag team match	7:34
4	Mayu Iwatani and Tam Nakano defeated Oedo Tai (Fukigen Death and Saki Kashima) by pinfall	Tag team match	10:04
5	Donna Del Mondo (Syuri, Maika and Himeka) vs. Donna Del Mondo (Giulia, Thekla and Mirai) ended in a time-limit draw	Six-woman tag team match	20:00
6	FWC (Hazuki and Koguma) (c) defeated Cosmic Angels (Mina Shirakawa and Unagi Sayaka) by pinfall	Tag team match for the Goddesses of Stardom Championship	12:28
7	AZM defeated Starlight Kid (c) by submission	Singles match for the High Speed Championship	17:03
8	Saya Kamitani (c) defeated Natsupoi by pinfall	Singles match for the Wonder of Stardom Championship	21:55
(c) / – the champion(s) heading into the match; P / – the match was broadcast on the pre-show
