= Stardom Golden Week Fight Tour =

2022 World Wonder Ring Stardom event

- Promotional poster featuring various Stardom wrestlers
- Promotion: World Wonder Ring Stardom
- Date: May 5, 2022
- City: Fukuoka, Japan
- Venue: Fukuoka Convention Center
- Attendance: 1,156

Event chronology
← Previous; Stardom Cinderella Tournament 2022	Next → New Blood 2

Stardom Golden Week Fight Tour (スターダムゴールデンウィークファイトツアー, Sutādamugōruden'u~īkufaitotsuā) was a professional wrestling event promoted by World Wonder Ring Stardom. The event took place on May 5, 2022, in Fukuoka, Japan at the Fukuoka Convention Center, with a limited attendance due in part to the ongoing COVID-19 pandemic at the time.

Seven matches were contested at the event, including one on the pre-show, and three of Stardom's seven championships were on the line. The main event saw Saya Kamitani defeat Maika to retain the Wonder of Stardom Championship. In other prominent matches, FWC (Hazuki and Koguma) defeated Black Desire (Momo Watanabe and Starlight Kid) to win the Goddesses of Stardom Championship, and Mayu Iwatani defeated Thekla to win the SWA World Championship.

== Storylines ==
=== Background ===
After she successfully defended the World of Stardom Championship against Giulia at Stardom World Climax 2022 on March 26, Syuri announced her departure from Donna Del Mondo to create a new stable which was later named as God's Eye, with Mirai and Ami Sourei being the first two recruits that Syuri aligned herself with. The new unit's leader stated that God's Eye will number one more member on May 5, where they will face Donna Del Mondo in an elimination tag team match. On the first night of the 2022 Cinderella Tournament from April 3, Saya Kamitani and Maika went into a double disqualification after they eliminated themselves simultaneously over the top rope. The 2021's edition of the tournament finalists were set to collide on May 5 for Kamitani's "White belt" after Maika issued a challenge.

=== Event ===
The show featured total of seven professional wrestling matches that resulted from scripted storylines, where wrestlers portrayed villains, heroes, or less distinguishable characters in the scripted events that built tension and culminated in a wrestling match or series of matches. The event will be the pay-per-view and largest show of the "Stardom Golden Week Fight Tour" series of smaller events which will take place between May 1 and 8, 2022. The event's press conference was held on April 27, 2022, at the Tokyo Culture Culture venue and was broadcast on Stardom's YouTube channel.

Jushin Liger joined the commentary table for the night. On the third match of the night, Mayu Iwatani defeated Thekla to win the SWA World Championship and being one title away from winning all of Stardom's possible championships. Iwatani was also billed as the second "grand slam champion" of Stardom alongside Io Shirai. The fifth match saw God's Eye's Syuri, Mirai, Ami Sourei and a briefly returning Konami picking up a victory over Donna Del Mondo (Giulia, Himeka, Natsupoi and Mai Sakurai). The following bout saw Hazuki and Koguma recapturing the Goddesses of Stardom Championship from Momo Watanabe and Starlight Kid. They became the first team to ever win the titles on more than one occasion.

The main event portraited the confrontation between Saya Kamitani and Maika for the Wonder of Stardom Championship, match which solded with Kamitani retaining her title. After the victory, Cinderella Tournament winner Mirai stepped up to remind Kamitani of their title match from Stardom Flashing Champions which was set to occur on May 28, 2022.

== Results ==
No.	Results	Stipulations	Times
1^{P}	Hina defeated Waka Tsukiyama	Singles match	6:25
2	Stars (Hanan, Saya Iida and Momo Kohgo) defeated Oedo Tai (Saki Kashima, Ruaka and Rina)	Six-woman tag team match	8:43
3	Cosmic Angels (Tam Nakano, Mina Shirakawa and Unagi Sayaka) defeated Queen's Quest (Utami Hayashishita, AZM and Lady C)	Six-woman tag team match	10:03
4	Mayu Iwatani defeated Thekla (c)	Singles match for the SWA World Championship	17:26
5	God's Eye (Syuri, Mirai, Ami Sourei and Konami) defeated Donna Del Mondo (Giulia, Himeka, Natsupoi and Mai Sakurai)	Eight-woman elimination tag team match	26:32
6	FWC (Hazuki and Koguma) defeated Black Desire (Momo Watanabe and Starlight Kid) (c)	Tag team match for the Goddesses of Stardom Championship	22:19
7	Saya Kamitani (c) defeated Maika	Singles match for the Wonder of Stardom Championship	24:58
(c) / – the champion(s) heading into the match; P / – the match was broadcast on the pre-show
