= Stardom New Blood 1 =

2022 World Wonder Ring Stardom event

New Blood 1
- Promotional poster of the event
- Promotion: World Wonder Ring Stardom
- Date: March 11, 2022
- City: Tokyo, Japan
- Venue: Shinagawa Intercity Hall
- Attendance: 416

Event chronology
← Previous; Cinderella Journey	Next → World Climax 2022

New Blood chronology
← Previous; First	Next → New Blood 2

Stardom New Blood 1 (スターダムニューブラッド1, Sutādamunyūburaddo 1) was a professional wrestling event promoted by World Wonder Ring Stardom. The event took place on March 11, 2022, in Tokyo, Japan at the Shinagawa Intercity Hall, with a limited attendance due in part to the ongoing COVID-19 pandemic at the time.

Six matches were contested at the event. In the main event, Utami Hayashishita defeated Miyu Amasaki in the latter's in-ring debut, and accepted the former's request to join Queen's Quest.

== Event ==
The "New Blood" is a series of events which mainly focus on matches where rookie wrestlers, usually with three or less years of in-ring experience, evolve. Besides wrestlers from Stardom, various superstars from multiple promotions of the Japanese independent scene are invited to compete in bouts that are usually going under the stipulation of singles or tag team matches.

The show featured a total of six professional wrestling matches that resulted from scripted storylines, where wrestlers portrayed villains, heroes, or less distinguishable characters in the scripted events that built tension and culminated in a wrestling match or series of matches. The press conference for the event was held on March 1, 2022 and was broadcast on Stardom's YouTube channel.

=== Storylines ===
The event featured various competitors from other promotions (Gatoh Move Pro Wrestling, Professional Wrestling Just Tap Out, Marvelous That's Women Pro Wrestling and World Woman Pro-Wrestling Diana) which at the time of it, several of them were still in their rookie years of professional wrestling. The show also portraited the return of Saya Iida who was sidelined with injury for almost one year. Another special featuring of the event was the in-ring debut of Miyu Amasaki (real name Miyu Matsuda) who had her first-ever confrontation against Utami Hayashishita.

All the matches of the pay-per-view have been broadcast live on YouTube. The show began with the confrontation between Stars stable member Momo Kohgo and Sayaka from Gatoh Move Pro Wrestling which concluded with the victory of Kohgo as the preshow match. The following bout portrayed Ai Houzan & Maria from Marvelous picking a victory over Cosmic Angels' members Unagi Sayaka & Waka Tsukiyama. Their encounter ended with Maria having a grudge over Sayaka, leaving them to engage in a brief altercation. The third match saw Saya Kamitani & Lady C going into a 15-minute time-limit draw against Mirai & Mai Sakurai. The fourth match captioned a returning Saya Iida teaming up with Stars stablemate, the then-time Future of Stardom Champion Hanan defeating JTO's Aoi & Tomoka Inaba. The moment concluded with a brief staredown between Hanan and the then-time Sendai Girls Junior Champion Inaba who raised their belts following their staredown. The fifth match depicted Oedo Tai's Starlight Kid & Ruaka successfully battling Diana's Nanami and one half of the World Woman Pro-Wrestling Diana Tag Team Champions, Haruka Umesaki.

The main event portraited the showdown between Utami Hayashishita and the debuting Miyu Amasaki. Despite the latter's loss, Hayashishita was impressed by Amasaki's performance and invited her to join Queen's Quest, which Amasaki accepted.

== Results ==
No.	Results	Stipulations	Times
1	Momo Kohgo defeated Sayaka	Singles match	7:45
2	Marvelous (Maria and Ai Houzan) defeated Cosmic Angels (Unagi Sayaka and Waka Tsukiyama) by submission	Tag team match	9:49
3	Queen's Quest (Saya Kamitani and Lady C) vs. Donna Del Mondo (Mirai and Mai Sakurai) ended in a time limit draw	Tag team match	15:00
4	Stars (Hanan and Saya Iida) defeated JTO (Tomoka Inaba and Aoi)	Tag team match	12:11
5	Oedo Tai (Starlight Kid and Ruaka) defeated Diana (Haruka Umesaki and Nanami)	Tag team match	13:16
6	Utami Hayashishita defeated Miyu Amasaki	Singles match	11:52
