= Queen's Quest =

Professional wrestling stable

- Queen's Quest official logo

Stable
- Members: See below
- Debut: November 11, 2016
- Disbanded: July 28, 2024
- Years active: 2016–2024

Queen's Quest (クイーンズクエスト, Kuīnzukuesuto) was a professional wrestling stable which mainly performed in the Japanese professional wrestling promotion World Wonder Ring Stardom and the Japanese independent scene between 2016 and 2024.

== History ==
=== World Wonder Ring Stardom (2016–2024) ===
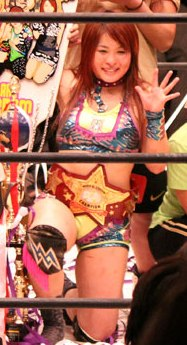
First leader of the unit Io Shirai, shown here with the World of Stardom Championship.

==== Formation ====
At the final of the 2016 Goddesses of Stardom Tag League which took place on November 11, Io Shirai and Mayu Iwatani lost the decisive match to Kairi Hojo and Yoko Bito, which led to Shirai's frustration towards Iwatani, attacking her with the help of a returning Reo Hazuki (who went by HZK thereafter). Following Shirai's loss back from November 11 HZK started a feud for the Wonder of Stardom Championship against Kairi Hojo which culminated on December 9, 2016, on the fifth night of the Goddesses Of Stars event. Momo Watanabe joined the duo of Shirai and HZK nine days later together with the trio assuming the name Queen's Quest on November 27.

==== Io Shirai's leadership (2016–2018) ====
On December 22, 2016, at Year-End Climax 2016, HZK and Momo Watanabe unsuccessfully challenged the guest team of Twisted Sisters (Holidead and Thunder Rosa) for the NWA Western States Tag Team Championship.

HZK, Io Shirai and Watanabe won their first titles, the Artist of Stardom Championship, on January 7, 2017 by defeating Oedo Tai (Kagetsu, Viper and Kyoko Kimura). Later in January, Watanabe suffered an ACL injury during training that forced her to go on a hiatus. Following a match involving HZK and Shirai on February 11, Azumi came into the ring and requested to join Queen's Quest, to which Shirai accepted. Thereafter, Azumi would go by the ring name AZM. On April 9, the Artist of Stardom Championship was vacated due to Watanabe being sidelined with her injury. After seven days, AZM, HZK and Shirai teamed up to win the vacant Artist of Stardom Championship by defeating Oedo Tai (Hana Kimura, Kagetsu and Rosa Negra) in the finals of a four-team tournament. AZM, HZK and Shirai lost the Artist of Stardom Championship to Hiromi Mimura, Kairi Hojo and Konami on May 6. AZM, HZK and Shirai won the Artist of Stardom Championship again on June 4 by defeating Hiromi Mimura, Kairi Hojo and Konami, which they then lost to Team Jungle (Hiroyo Matsumoto, Jungle Kyona and Kaori Yoneyama) on June 17. HZK, Shirai and Viper teamed up at Midsummer Champions from August 13, to defeat Team Jungle (Hiroyo Matsumoto, Jungle Kyona and Kaori Yoneyama) for the Artist of Stardom Championship. At the 2017 Goddesses of Stardom League, which took place between October 4 and November 5, HZK and Shirai represented the stable, placing themselves in the A Block and scoring a total of five points. On November 4, Watanabe returned from her hiatus.

At the 2018 Stardom Draft on April 15, 2018 Bea Priestley, Chardonnay and Konami were drafted to Queen's Quest while HZK left because she was drafted by Oedo Tai. Because HZK left Queen's Quest, the Artist of Stardom Championship held by HZK, Shirai and Viper was declared vacant. On May 23, Watanabe defeated Shirai for the Wonder of Stardom Championship, culminating a friendly feud. On June 17, it was announced that Shirai would leave Queen's Quest and subsequently World Wonder Ring Stardom to pursue a career in WWE.

==== Momo Watanabe's leadership (2018–2021) ====
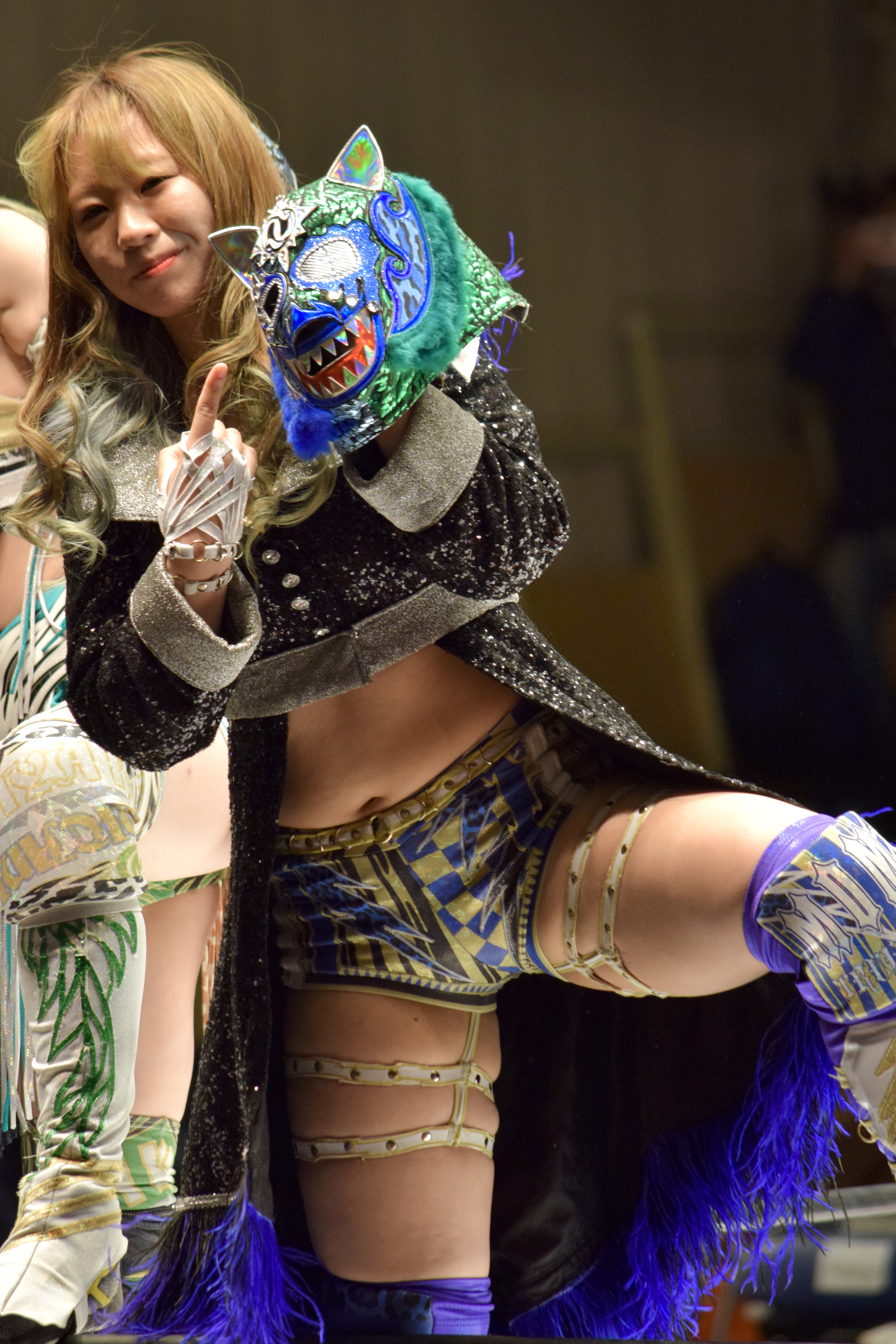
Second leader of the unit, Momo Watanabe.

After Io Shirai's departure from Stardom in June 2018, the leadership of Queen's Quest was passed to Momo Watanabe. On August 26, Watanabe and Utami Hayashishita teamed up for the first time to win a four-way tag team match. Hayashishita and Watanabe continued to team up to compete in the 2018 Goddesses of Stardom Tag League, as did the team of AZM and Konami and the team of Bea Priestley and Chardonnay. On November 4, Hayashishita and Watanabe won the tournament by defeating Chardonnay and Priestley in the finals. On November 23, Watanabe and Hayashishita won the Goddesses of Stardom Championship by defeating J.A.N. (Jungle Kyona and Natsuko Tora). Following the match, Hayashishita joined Queen's Quest.

On January 5, 2019, Hayashishita, Priestley and Viper won a one-day Trios Tag Team Tournament. On January 14, Hayashishita defeated Viper to win the Pro-Wrestling: EVE International Championship and the SWA Undisputed World Women's Championship. As a result of the 2019 Stardom Draft on April 14, Hina and Leo Onozaki joined Queen's Quest, while Konami left to join the International Army. On July 15, Hayashishita and Watanabe lost the Goddesses of Stardom Championship to Tokyo Cyber Squad (Jungle Kyona and Konami). On November 23, AZM, Hayashishita and Watanabe won the Artist of Stardom Championship by defeating Oedo Tai (Andras Miyagi, Kagetsu and Natsu Sumire).

On January 19, 2020, at Stardom's 9th Anniversary show, Priestley teamed up with Oedo Tai's Jamie Hayter to win the Goddesses of Stardom Championship by defeating Tokyo Cyber Squad (Jungle Kyona and Konami), marking the first time when two cross-faction members held titles together. Priestley later turned heel on the same night and left Queen's Quest for Oedo Tai. On February 8, AZM, Hayashishita and Watanabe lost the Artist of Stardom Championship to Donna Del Mondo (Giulia, Maika and Syuri). On February 16, Onozaki retired from professional wrestling. Later that night, Saya Kamitani joined Queen's Quest after unsuccessfully challenging Hayashishita for the Future of Stardom Championship. AZM, Hayashishita, Kamitani and Watanabe all competed in the 2020 Cinderella Tournament on March 24. Only Watanabe reached the quarter-finals, where she lost to Giulia. At Cinderella Summer In Tokyo on July 26, AZM won the High Speed Championship by defeating Riho and Starlight Kid, and Hayashishita and Kamitani won the vacant Goddesses of Stardom Championship by defeating Tokyo Cyber Squad (Jungle Kyona and Konami). On September 28, at the 5Star Special, AZM, Hayashishita and Watanabe lost to returning guest performers Rin Kadokura, Takumi Iroha and Mei Hoshizuki in a six-woman tag team match. At the 2020 Goddesses of Stardom Tag League, Hayashishita and Kamitani participated as AphrOditE, and AZM teamed up with Watanabe as MOMOAZ. MOMOAZ won the tournament by defeating Crazy Bloom in the finals on November 8. At Sendai Cinderella 2020 on November 15, 2020, Hayashishita won the World of Stardom Championship by defeating Mayu Iwatani. Hayashishita subsequently became the new top star and the main focus of the stable, while Watanabe remained the official leader. (Note: As reflected in her official profile on the Stardom website, their Roster page as well as being billed as and referencing herself as such after that point) Watanabe was acknowledged as the leader of Queen's Quest by Hayashishita after their title match on December 20. On December 26, AphrOditE lost the Goddesses of Stardom Championship to Oedo Tai (Bea Priestley and Konami).

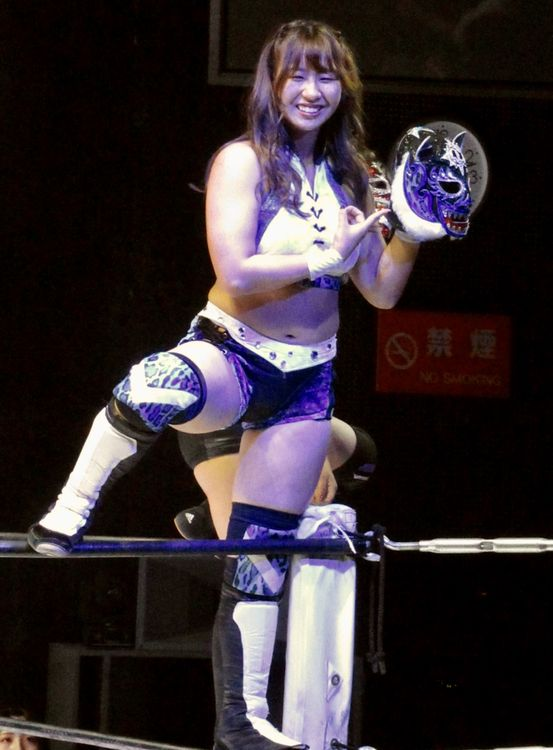
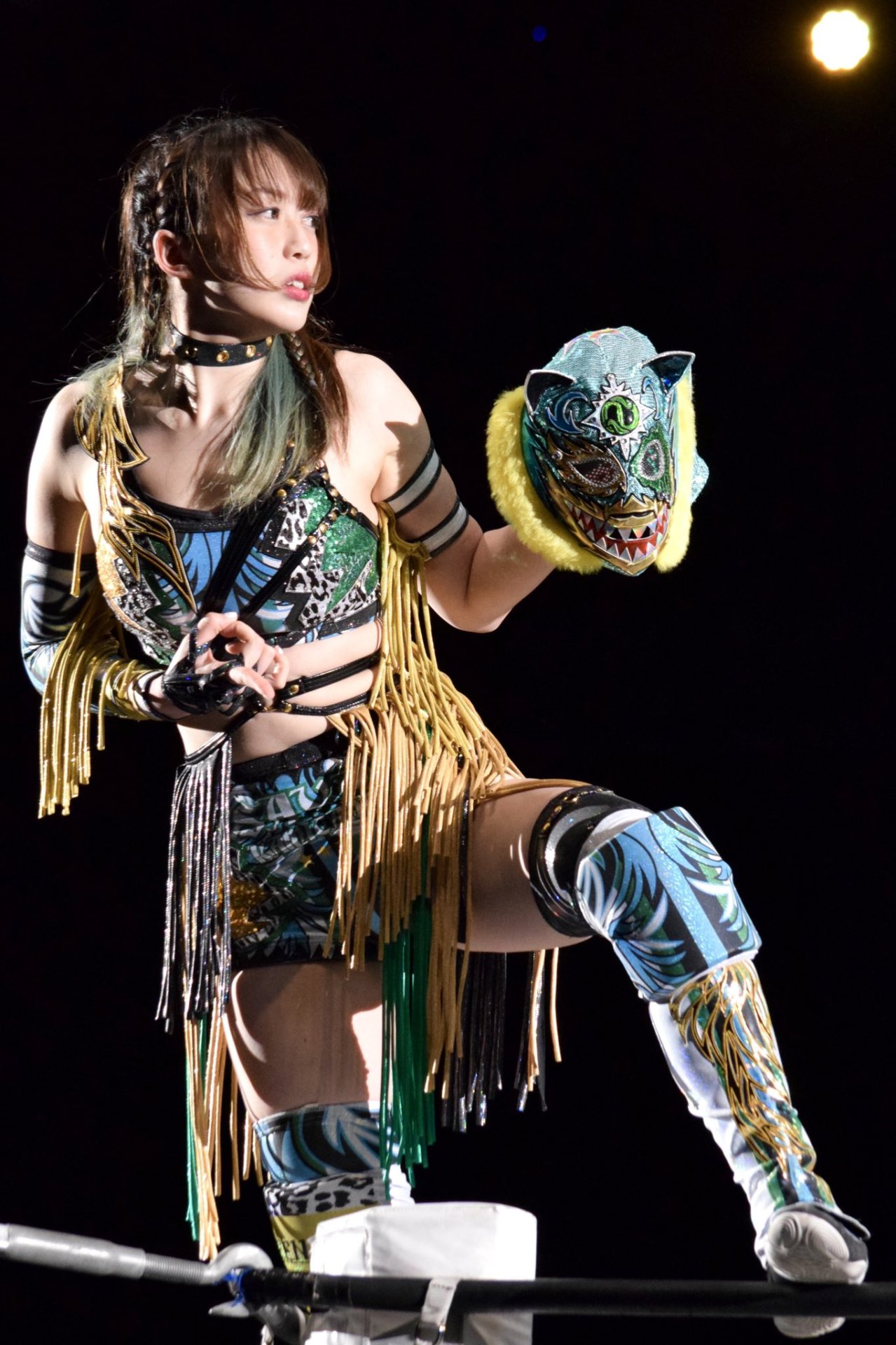
All of the stable's members were known for wearing mask design inspired from Tiger Mask's until early 2022. For example, Momo Watanabe (left) and Saya Kamitani (right) wearing custom made masks.

At All Star Dream Cinderella on March 3, 2021, AZM lost the High Speed Championship to Natsupoi, and Hayashishita defeated Kamitani in an inter-stable clash for the World of Stardom Championship. At Yokohama Dream Cinderella 2021 on April 4 Hayashishita successfully defended the World of Stardom Championship against former stable member Bea Priestley in what was Priestley's last match in Stardom. On the first night of the 2021 Cinderella Tournament which took place on April 10, AZM fell short to Rina and Momo Watanabe to Starlight Kid in a Cinderella Tournament First-round match, while Utami Hayashishita scored a victory over Mina Shirakawa and Saya Kamitani over Tam Nakano in the same tournament stages. On the second night from May 14, Saya Kamitani defeated Starlight Kid in a second-round match, while Utami Hayashishita fell short to Syuri. Saya Kamitani won the 2021 Cinderella Tournament by defeating Himeka in the semi-finals and Maika in the final match. She issued a challenge to Tam Nakano for the Wonder of Stardom Championship as her granted wish for winning the competition. At Yokohama Dream Cinderella 2021 in Summer on July 4, Utami Hayashishita successfully defended the World of Stardom Championship by doctor stoppage after Natsuko Tora sustained a knee injury during the match. For the 2021 5Star Grand Prix, Utami Hayashishita, Saya Kamitani, AZM and Momo Watanabe were listed as participants of the tournament. On the finals of the event from September 25, Momo Watanabe fell short to Syuri. At Stardom 10th Anniversary Grand Final Osaka Dream Cinderella from October 9, 2021, Momo Watanabe, AZM and Saya Kamitani unsuccessfully challenged MaiHimePoi for the Artist of Stardom Championship. At Kawasaki Super Wars on November 3, 2021, Momo Watanabe battled Starlight Kid in a time-limit draw for the High Speed Championship.

Momo Watanabe had been the victim of Starlight Kid's mind games as the latter's strategy to gain more recruits into Oedo Tai since Kawasaki Super Wars on November 3. Their feud degenerated into an eight-woman elimination tag team match in which both of them would be the captains of their respective teams. The losing captain would be forced to join the enemy unit and if Starlight Kid lost, she would have to unmask. The match took place on December 18, at Osaka Super Wars. With the match coming down to the wire and Queen's Quest holding a 2 to 1 advantage over Starlight Kid, Momo Watanabe betrayed her faction and hit her long-time tag team partner AZM over the head with a chair, handing the win to Oedo Tai and anointing herself the “Black Peach” of the group. Watanabe became the first leader of a Stardom faction to betray their own unit.

==== Post-Momo Watanabe era (2021–2022) ====
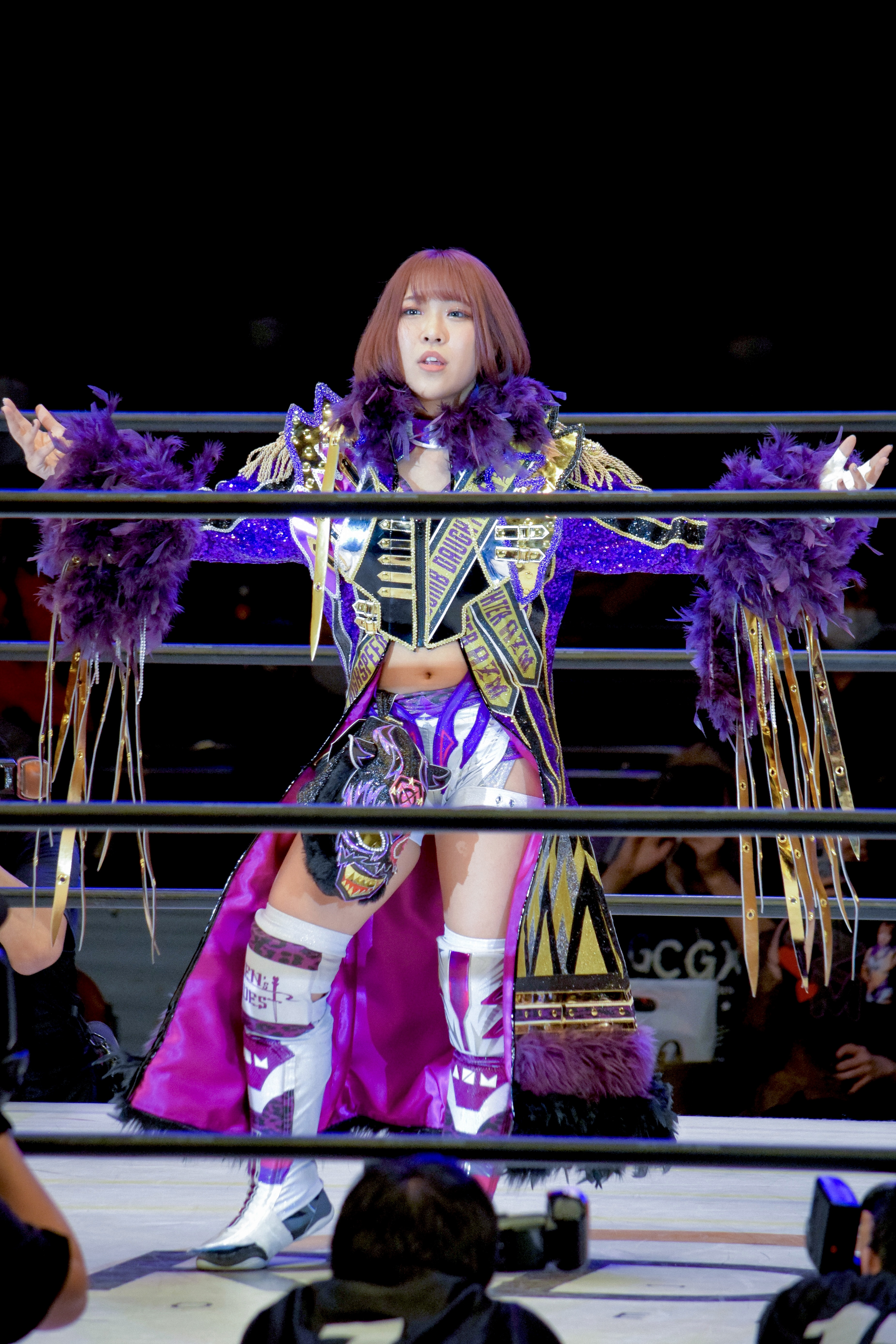
The third and assumed de facto leader during the Post Watanabe era, AZM.

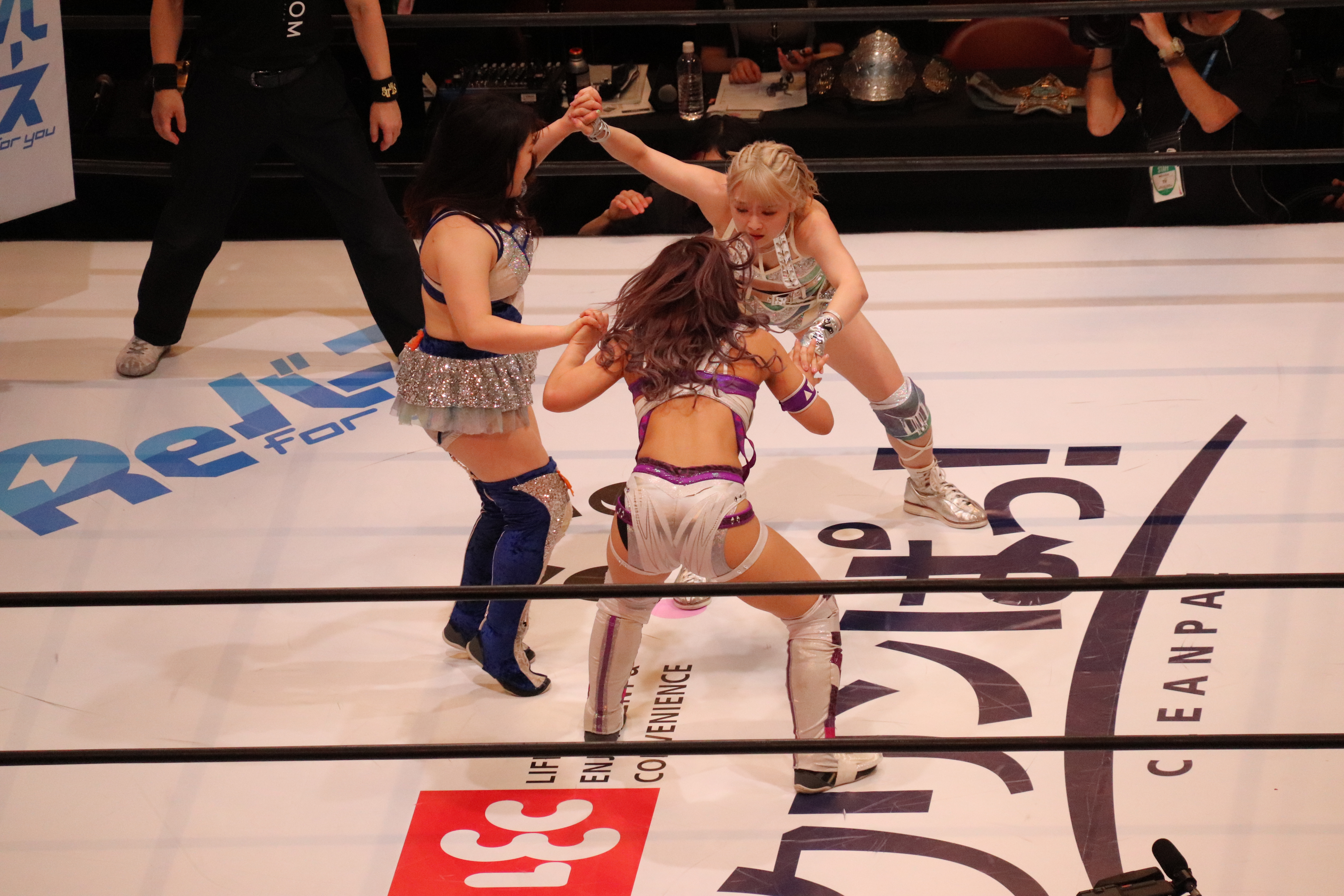
AZM (middle) facing Koguma (left) and Natsupoi (right) on the first night of the Stardom World Climax 2022 from March 26.

At Stardom Dream Queendom on December 29, 2021, AZM unsuccessfully challenged Starlight Kid and Koguma in a three-way match for the High Speed Championship, Saya Kamitani defeated Tam Nakano to win the Wonder of Stardom Championship and Utami Hayashishita dropped the World of Stardom Championship to Syuri with her reign coming to an end at 409 days.

At Stardom Award in Shinjuku on January 3, 2022, AZM, Kamitani and Hayashishita engaged in a brawl with Oedo Tai after their match against Fukigen Death, Saki Kashima and Ruaka. Obviously outnumbered, the three members of Queen's Quest received help from Lady C who rushed down the ring to try to save them. After Oedo Tai retreated, Hayashishita offered C a spot into the unit which the latter accepted so she was later announced to join the stable in the process. On January 9, 2022, at Stardom in Korakuen Hall, Saya Kamitani, Utami Hayashishta and Lady C unsuccessfully wrestled Oedo Tai's Rina, Momo Watanabe, Starlight Kid and Ruaka in a 4-on-3 handicap match. After their loss, the Queen's Quest members announced they will no longer wear their masks as they will move forward and away from the Momo Watanabe era. At Stardom Nagoya Supreme Fight on January 29, 2022, Utami Hayashishita and AZM battled Oedo Tai's Momo Watanabe and Starlight Kid in a losing effort as a result of a grudge tag team match. At Stardom Cinderella Journey on February 23, 2022, Utami Hayashishita teamed up with Lady C in a losing effort against Momo Watanabe and Ruaka, and AZM defeated Starlight Kid to win the High Speed Championship. In the main event of Stardom New Blood 1 on March 11, 2022, Utami Hayashishita defeated a debuting Miyu Amasaki. Despite the latter's loss, Hayashishita was impressed by Amasaki's performance and invited her to join Queen's Quest, which Amasaki accepted. On the first night of the Stardom World Climax 2022 from March 26, Saya Kamitani successfully defended the Wonder of Stardom Championship against Utami Hayashishita. At Stardom Cinderella Tournament 2022, all the members of the stable participated in the namesake competition, with AZM and Saya Kamitani scoring the best results by making it to the second rounds of the tournament. At Stardom Golden Week Fight Tour on May 5, 2022, Utami Hayashishita, AZM and Lady C fell short to Tam Nakano, Mina Shirakawa and Unagi Sayaka, and Saya Kamitani successfully defended the Wonder of Stardom Championship against Maika.

==== Utami Hayashishita's leadership (2022–2024) ====
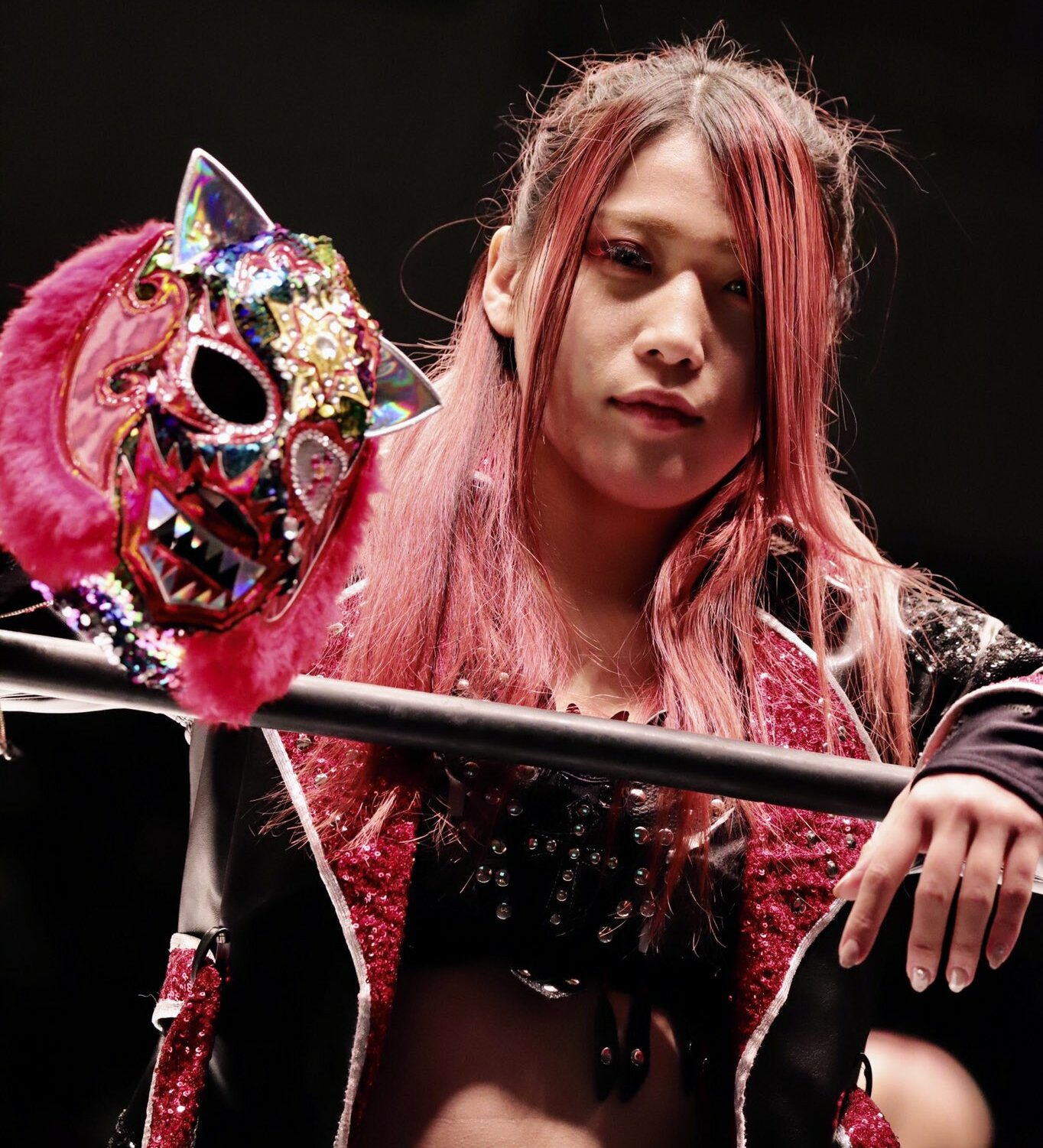
Fourth leader of the stable, Utami Hayashishita.

On May 15, 2022, a five-way match between AZM, Hina, Lady C, Saya Kamitani and Utami Hayashishita took place to elect a new leader of Queen's Quest. Hayashishita won the match, therefore becoming the fourth leader of the stable.

At Stardom Flashing Champions on May 28, 2022, Utami Hayashishita and Miyu Amasaki fell short to Tam Nakano and Kairi, while Saya Kamitani successfully defended the Wonder of Stardom Championship against Mirai. At Fight in the Top on June 26, AZM, Hayashishita and Kamitani took part in one of Stardom's first steel cage matches, in which they lost to Stars (Hazuki, Koguma and Mayu Iwatani). On the first night of the Stardom Mid Summer Champions event from July 9, 2022, Lady C defeated Hina and Yuko Sakurai in three-way competition, Utami Hayashishita and Miyu Amasaki fell short to Mirai and Ami Sohrei, AZM defeated Momo Kohgo to successfully defend the High Speed Championship, Saya Kamitani successfully defended the Wonder of Stardom Championship against Starlight Kid. On the second night from July 24, AZM defeated Rina to successfully defend the High Speed Championship, Saya Kamitani successfully defended the Wonder of Stardom Championship against Saki. At Stardom in Showcase vol.1 on July 23, 2022, AZM defeated Momo Watanabe, Tam Nakano and Koguma in a Four-way falls count anywhere match, while Saya Kamitani fell short to Yuu and Starlight Kid in a casket match. At Stardom x Stardom: Nagoya Midsummer Encounter on August 21, 2022, Miyu Amasaki unsuccessfully challenged Hanan for the Future of Stardom Championship, Hina fell short to Maika, AZM, Lady C and Utami Hayashishita defeated Mayu Iwatani, Momo Kohgo and Saya Iida), and Saya Kamitani successfully defended the Wonder of Stardom Championship against Himeka. At Stardom in Showcase vol.2 on September 25, Hayashishita and Lady C teamed up with Syuri as Rossy Ogawa's Bodyguard Army, falling short to Grim Reaper Army (Yuu, Nanae Takahashi & Yuna Manase). At Hiroshima Goddess Festival on November 3, 2022, AZM defeated Lady C and Miyu Amasaki competed in a five-way match, Utami Hayashishita defeated Natsuko Tora, and Saya Kamitani successfully defended the Wonder of Stardom Championship against Mina Shirakawa. At Stardom Gold Rush on November 19, 2022, AZM defeated Momoka Hanazono to successfully defend the High Speed Championship, Saya Kamitani successfully defended the Wonder of Stardom Championship after drawing against Kairi, while Utami Hayashishita unsuccessfully challenged Syuri for the World of Stardom Championship. At Stardom in Showcase vol.3 on November 26, Hayashishita and Hina teamed up with Mirai in a losing effort against Mayu Iwatani, Hanan and Maika in a judo rules match. At Stardom Dream Queendom 2022 on December 29, AZM defeated Hikari Shimizu to successfully defend the High Speed Championship, Utami Hayashishita wrestled Kairi into a time-limit draw, while Saya Kamitani successfully defended the Wonder of Stardom Championship after drawing against Haruka Umesaki.

In the Triangle Derby I, the unit was represented by Utami Hayashishita, Saya Kamitani and AZM who failed to qualify to the finals. At Supreme Fight 2023 on February 4, Kamitani successfully defended the Wonder of Stardom Championship against Momo Watanabe. At Stardom in Showcase vol.4 on February 26, 2023, AZM defeated Hanan, Momoka Hanazono and Sumire Natsu, and Utami Hayashishita, Saya Kamitani and Miyu Amasaki unsuccessfully competed in a Three-way elimination tag team match. In the 2023 edition of the Stardom Cinderella Tournament], the stable was represented by AZM, Hina, Lady C, Miyu Amasaki, Saya Kamitani and Utami Hayashishita. At Stardom All Star Grand Queendom on April 23, 2023, Miyu Amasaki and Utami Hayashishita defeated Hazuki and Fuwa-chan, and Saya Kamitani dropped the Wonder of Stardom Championship to Mina Shirakawa. At Stardom Fukuoka Goddess Legend on May 5, 2023, Utami Hayashishita and Saya Kamitani fell short to Giulia and Maika, while AZM successfully defended the High Speed Championship against Mei Seira. At Stardom Flashing Champions 2023 on May 27, Hina, Utami Hayashishita and Saya Kamitani defeated Starlight Kid, Ruaka and Rina, and AZM dropped the High Speed Championship to Saki Kashima.

At Sunshine 2023 on June 25, Queen's Quest defeated Oedo Tai in a six-on-six steel cage match in which the losing unit was forced to lose a member. At Mid Summer Champions 2023 on July 2, Hayashishita announced that she would be taking a break from her leadership duties to go on an excursion in the United States in order to reevaluate herself. Hayashishita returned on the first night of the 2023 5 Star Grand Prix on July 23. At the same event, Kamitani suffered a legitimate dislocated elbow during her first match of the tournament against Tam Nakano, which resulted in Kamitani withdrawing from the tournament and going on a hiatus from professional wrestling. At Stardom x Stardom: Osaka Summer Team on August 13, 2023, Utami Hayashishita unsuccessfully challenged Mayu Iwatani for the IWGP Women's Championship. At Stardom Midsummer Festival on August 19, 2023, Utami Hayashishita, AZM and Miyu Amasaki teamed up with Kyoko Inoue in a losing effort against Vulgar Alliance (Dump Matsumoto, Zap) and BMI2000 (Natsuko Tora and Ruaka). At Stardom 5Star Special in Hiroshima on September 3, 2023, Lady C, AZM and Miyu Amasaki fell short to Ami Sourei, Yuna Mizumori and Thekla, and Utami Hayashishita defeated Momo Watanabe. At Stardom Dream Tag Festival on September 10, 2023, several stable members competed in shuffled tag team bouts in which they paired up with members from other units. Utami Hayashishita teamed up with Maika in a losing effort against Giulia and Suzu Suzuki, and Hina teamed up with Rina in a losing effort against Mai Sakurai and Mirai.

In September, Hayashishita suffered a cervical hernia, which caused her to go on a hiatus. At Stardom Nagoya Golden Fight 2023 on October 9, AZM fell short to Saori Anou. At Stardom Gold Rush 2023 on November 18, AZM defeated Suzu Suzuki and Starlight Kid.

Hayashishita and Kamitani returned together on November 28, 2023. At Nagoya Big Winter on December 2, AphrOditE won the vacant Goddesses of Stardom Championship by defeating Divine Kingdom. At Stardom Dream Queendom 2023, Utami Hayashishita and Saya Kamitani defeated XL (Natsuko Tora and Momo Watanabe) to retain the Goddesses of Stardom Championship.

At Stardom New Year Stars 2024 on January 3, Utami Hayashishita, Saya Kamitani and AZM drew against Suzu Suzuki, Megan Bayne and Mei Seira in the second-ever edition of the Triangle Derby, result which prevented both teams from advancing further in the tournament. At Ittenyon Stardom Gate on January 4, 2024, Utami Hayashishita, AZM and Saya Kamitani defeated Mirai, Ami Sohrei and Saki Kashima in six-way competition. At Stardom Supreme Fight 2024 on February 4, Lady C and Miyu Amasaki fell short to Natsuko Tora and Momo Watanabe, while AZM and Utami Hayashishita teamed up with Nanae Takahashi and Mayu Iwatani to defeat Syuri, Mirai, Giulia and Suzu Suzuki. At the Stardom Cinderella Tournament 2024, AZM, Miyu Amasaki and Lady C competed in the traditional tournament with AZM scoring the best results by becoming a semifinalist. On March 31, 2024, at a house show from Yamagata, Utami Hayashishita has had her last match in Stardom in which she teamed up with the time's rest of Queen's Quest's members in a losing effort against Oedo Tai's Momo Watanabe, Natsuko Tora, Rina, Ruaka and Starlight Kid.

==== The stable's downfall and Saya Kamitani's sole leadership (2024) ====
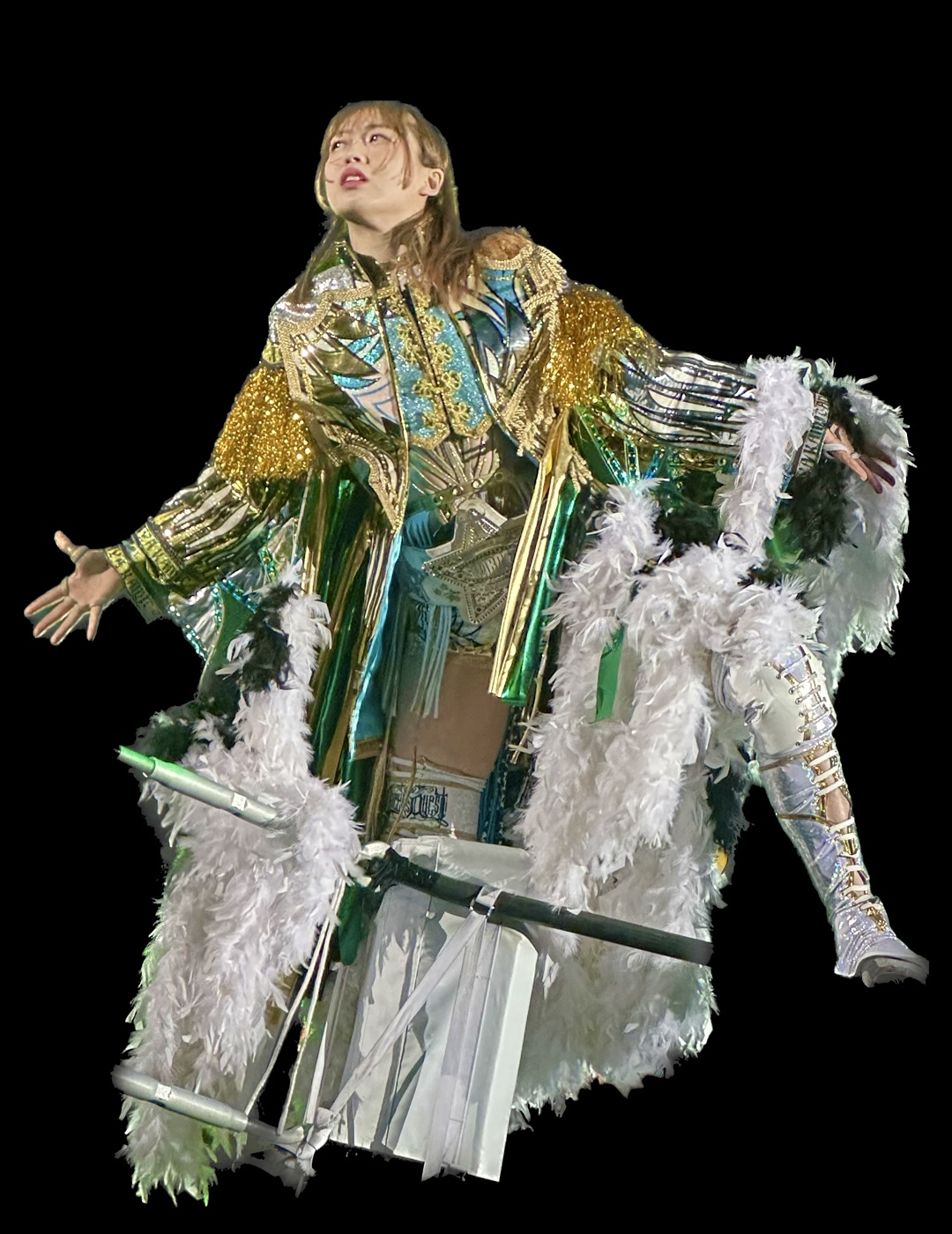
Fifth and final leader of the unit, Saya Kamitani.

After her departure from Stardom, Hayashishita left Queen's Quest leaderless after she was announced to head to Rossy Ogawa's newly created promotion of Dream Star Fighting Marigold. Saya Kamitani was later assumed to be the defacto leader of the unit while being the senior member. At Stardom American Dream 2024 on April 4, AZM and Saya Kamitani teamed up with Camron Branae in a losing effort against Starlight Kid, Momo Watanabe and Stephanie Vaquer. The bout led to AZM sharing a brief feud with Vaquer as they eventually collided at NJPW's Windy City Riot 2024 where AZM unsuccessfully challenged Vaquer for the Strong Women's Championship. At Stardom All Star Grand Queendom 2024 on April 27, Saya Kamitani defeated reigning champion Saki Kashima, Saya Iida and Fukigen Death to win the High Speed Championship. AZM and Miyu Amasaki unsuccessfully challenged for the Goddess of Stardom Championship in a four-way tag team match. At Stardom Flashing Champions 2024 on May 18, AZM, Miyu Amasaki and Lady C unsuccessfully competed in a number one contender gauntlet match for the Artist of Stardom Championship and Saya Kamitani successfully defended the High Speed Championship. At Stardom New Blood 13 on June 21, 2024, Hina and Miyu Amasaki fell short to Rina and Azusa Inaba.

At Stardom The Conversion on June 22, 2024, Saya Kamitani, AZM, Lady C, Hina and Miyu Amasaki fell short to Oedo Tai's Natsuko Tora, Thekla, Rina, Momo Watanabe and Ruaka in a Ten-woman elimination tag team match. Per the stipulation, since Kamitani was the last wrestler eliminated, AZM, Hina, Lady C, and Amasaki all had to leave Queen's Quest, assenting Kamitani to remain the sole member of the unit in the process, therefore taking the leadership of the stable. After dropping the High Speed Championship to Mei Seira on the second night of the Stardom Sapporo World Rendezvous event from July 28, 2024, Saya Kamitani attacked Maika during the latter's World of Stardom Championship match against Natsuko Tora. Kamitani then announced the dissolution of Queen's Quest as she aligned herself with the newly created unit of H.A.T.E. which took birth over the dissolution of Oedo Tai announced by Tora on the same night.

=== New Blood series (2022–2024) ===
Various of the unit's members often compete in the New Blood series of events. At Stardom New Blood 2 on May 13, 2022, Hina teamed up with Hanan and wrestled Tomoka Inaba and Aoi into a time-limit draw. At Stardom New Blood 3 on July 8, 2022, Miyu Amasaki fell short to Giulia in singles competition. At Stardom New Blood 4 on August 26, 2022, Miyu Amasaki fell short to Tam Nakano. At Stardom New Blood 5 on October 19, 2022, Hina and Lady C fell short to Suzu Suzuki and Ancham. At Stardom New Blood 6 on December 16, 2022, Miyu Amasaki defeated Miran, and Lady C fell short to Nanae Takahashi. At New Blood 7 on January 20, 2023, Hina and Lady C fell short to Mai Sakurai and Chanyota in the quarterfinals of the inaugural New Blood Tag Team Championship tournament. At Stardom New Blood Premium March 25, 2023, Miyu Amasaki fell short to Syuri. At Stardom New Blood 8 on May 12, 2023, Miyu Amasaki fell short to Momo Watanabe. At Stardom New Blood 9 on June 2, 2023, Miyu Amasaki fell short to AZM. At Stardom New Blood 10 on August 18, 2023, Miyu Amasaki fell short to Saori Anou. At Stardom New Blood 11 on September 28, 2023, AZM and Miyu Amasaki unsuccessfully challenged for the New Blood Tag Team Championship. At Stardom New Blood West 1 on November 17, 2023, Miyu Amasaki defeated ChiChi. At Stardom New Blood 12 on December 25, 2023, Miyu Amasaki teamed up with Haruka Umesaki and defeated Yuzuki and Hanako.

=== Japanese independent circuit (2017–2024) ===
Over time, various members of the stable worked beyond Stardom for other promotions. On September 4, 2017, at K-DOJO Taka Michinoku 25th Anniversary, an event promoted by Kaientai Dojo, HZK teamed up with Io Shirai to defeat Bambi and Erina. At Tokyo Gurentai Lucha Libre Fiesta, an event produced by Stardom in partnership with Tokyo Gurentai, AZM, Momo Watanabe and Utami Hayashishita represented Queen's Quest in a four-way tag team elimination match also involving STARS (Saki Kashima, Starlight Kid and Tam Nakano), Oedo Tai (Andras Miyagi, Hazuki and Kagetsu) and JAN (Jungle Kyona, Natsuko Tora and Saya Iida). At Assemble Vol. 2, an event produced by Women's Pro-Wrestling Assemble in partnership with Stardom on November 10, 2020, AZM teamed up with Saya Kamitani to defeat STARS (Starlight Kid and Saya Iida).

=== New Japan Pro Wrestling (2021–2024) ===
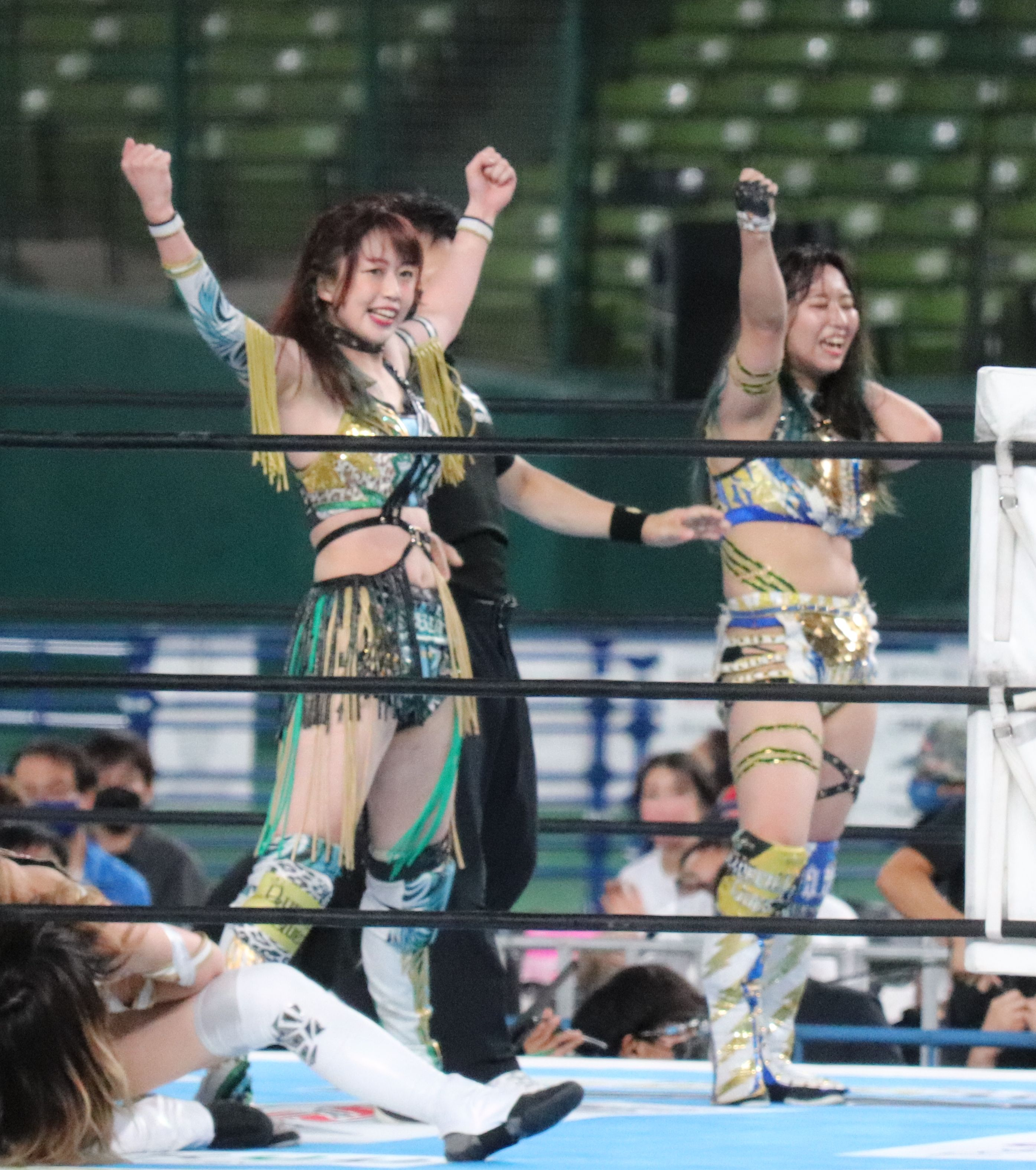
Momo Watanabe (right) and Saya Kamitani (left) after their victory at Wrestle Grand Slam in MetLife Dome

In time, various members of the stable competed in pay-per-views promoted by NJPW. On January 5, 2021, on the second night of Wrestle Kingdom 15, the biggest annual event promoted by New Japan Pro Wrestling, AZM, Saya Kamitani and Utami Hayashishita competed in an exhibition match against Donna Del Mondo's Himeka, Maika and Natsupoi, which they won. On the first night of the Wrestle Grand Slam in MetLife Dome from September 4, Momo Watanabe and Saya Kamitani teamed up to defeat with Lady C and Maika. Giulia and Syuri were also announced to compete on the second night against Watanabe and Kamitani. On the second night of Wrestle Kingdom 16 on January 5, 2022, Saya Kamitani teamed up with Tam Nakano to defeat Mayu Iwatani and Starlight Kid in a tag team match. At Historic X-Over on November 20, 2022, Hina and Miyu Amasaki competed in the Stardom Rambo, Saya Kamitani, AZM and Lady C defeated Thekla, Himeka and Mai Sakurai, and Utami Hayashishita teamed up with Hiroshi Tanahashi to defeat Maika and Hirooki Goto in a mixed tag team match.

== Members ==
Member		Joined	Left	Ref.
HZK	*	November 11, 2016	April 15, 2018	
Io Shirai	*I	November 11, 2016	June 17, 2018	
Momo Watanabe	*II	November 20, 2016	December 18, 2021	
Viper		July 30, 2017	June 30, 2019	
Chardonnay		April 15, 2018	June 30, 2019	
Bea Priestley		April 15, 2018	January 19, 2020	
Konami		April 15, 2018	April 14, 2019	
Utami Hayashishita	IV	November 23, 2018	April 12, 2024	
Leo Onozaki		April 14, 2019	February 16, 2020	
AZM	III (Note: AZM acted as the assumed defacto leader during the post Momo Watanabe era)	February 11, 2017	June 22, 2024	
Hina		April 14, 2019	June 22, 2024	
Lady C		January 3, 2022	June 22, 2024	
Miyu Amasaki		March 11, 2022	June 22, 2024	
Saya Kamitani	V (Note: On June 22, 2024 at Stardom The Conversion, all then-time members of the unit fell short to Oedo Tai in a ten-woman elimination tag team match. Per the special stipulation, Kamitani was the last wrestler eliminated, AZM, Hina, Lady C, and Amasaki all had to leave Queen's Quest, assenting Kamitani to remain the sole member of the unit in the process, thus taking the leadership of the stable.)	February 16, 2020	July 28, 2024	

=== Timeline ===
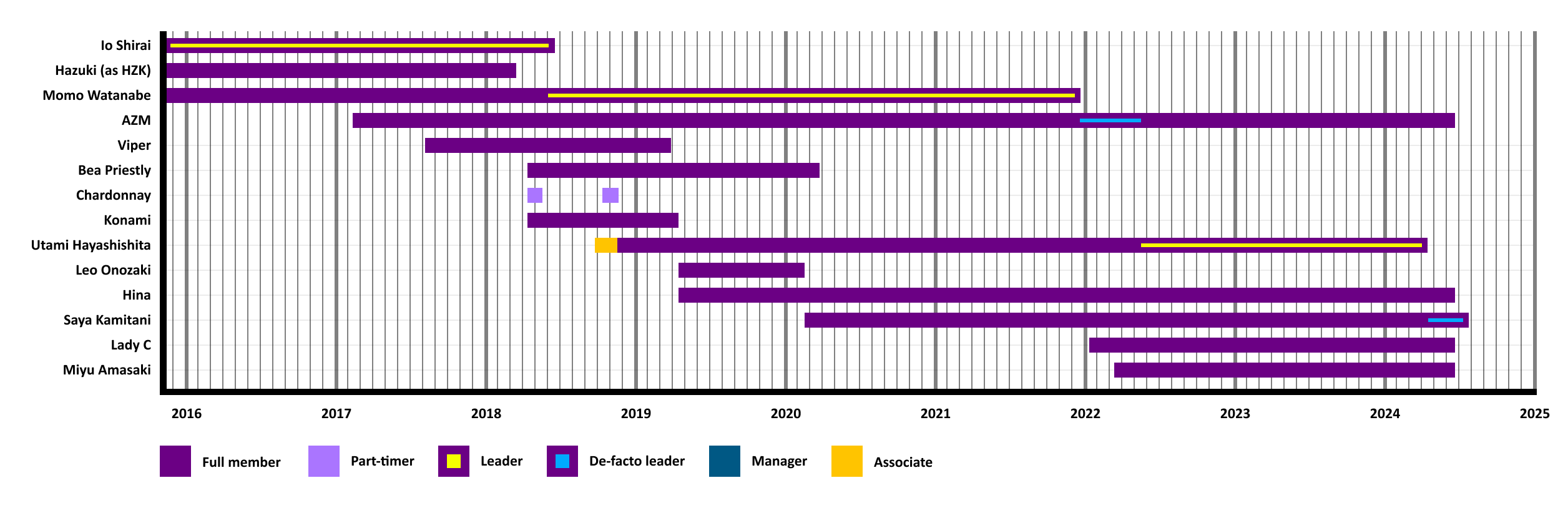

== Sub-groups ==
Affiliate	Members	Tenure	Type
MOMOAZ	Momo Watanabe; AZM	2017–2021	Tag team
Royal Peach Tea	Momo Watanabe; Utami Hayashishita	2018–2019 (Note: This team was active only when Watanabe and Hayashishita held the Goddesses of Stardom Championship.)	Tag team
Queen's Quest UK	Bea Priestley; Chardonnay; Viper	2018–2020 (Note: The trio of Priestley, Viper & Chardonnay while working in the UK built their own sub-unit of Queen's Quest known as Queen's Quest UK. The subunit quietly disbanded in 2020/21 with Priestley leaving Queen's Quest and all three eventually leaving for Stardom for other promotions.)	Sub-unit
AphroditE	Utami Hayashishita; Saya Kamitani	2020–2024	Tag team
02line	AZM; Miyu Amasaki	2022–2024	Tag team

== Championships and accomplishments ==
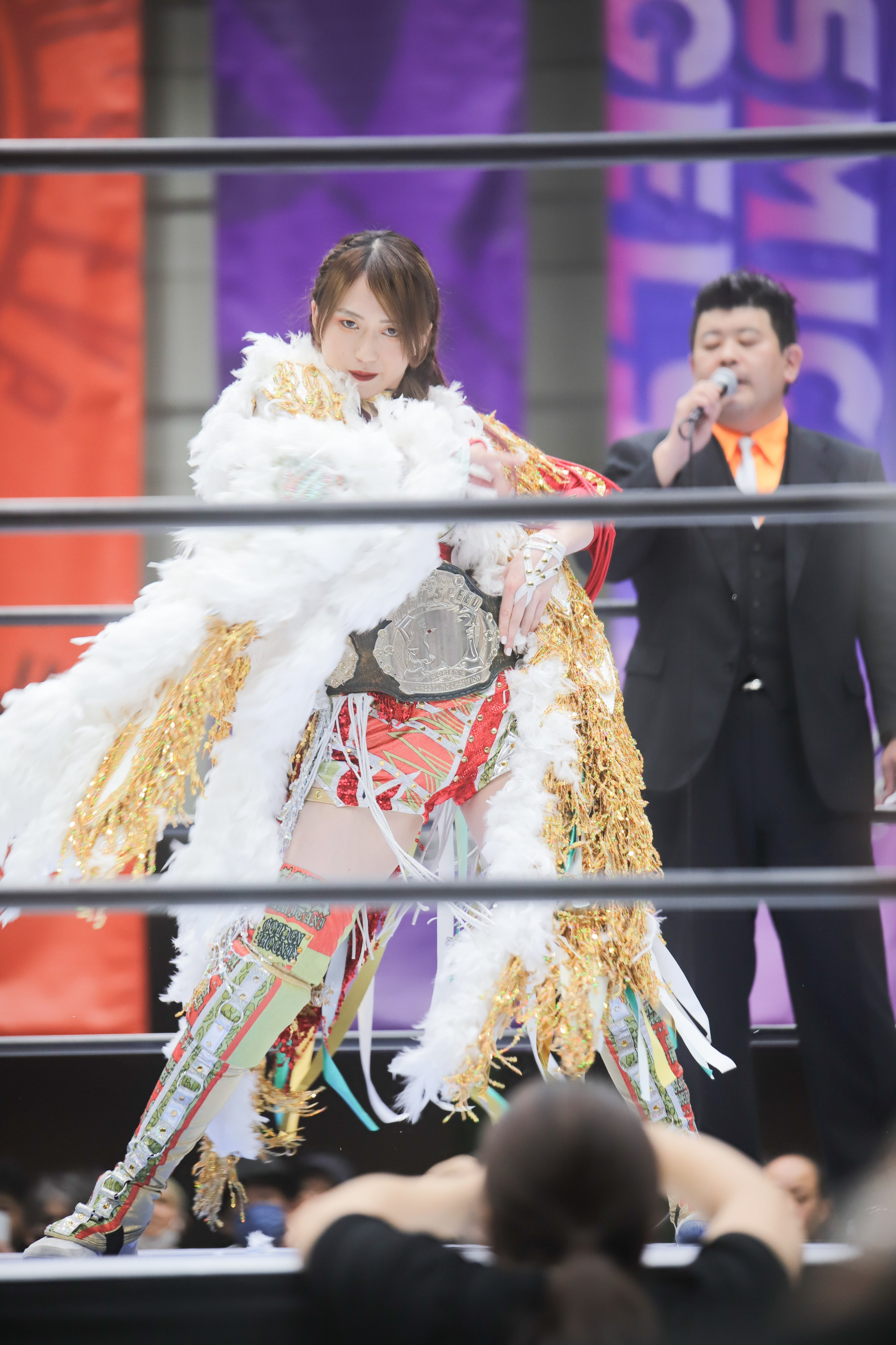
Saya Kamitani as the High Speed Champion in 2024.

- Pro-Wrestling: EVE
  - Pro-Wrestling: EVE International Championship (2 times) – Utami Hayashishita (1) and Viper (1)
- Pro Wrestling Illustrated
  - Singles wrestlers
    - Ranked AZM No. 16 in the PWI Women's 150 in 2022
    - Ranked Bea Priestley No. 20 in the PWI Women's 100 in 2019
    - Ranked Io Shirai No. 6 in the PWI Women's 50 in 2017
    - Ranked Momo Watanabe No. 32 in the PWI Women's 100 in 2020
    - Ranked Saya Kamitani No. 7 in the PWI Women's 150 in 2022
    - Ranked Utami Hayashishita No. 2 in the PWI Women's 150 in 2021
    - Ranked Viper No. 37 in the PWI Women's 100 in 2018
  - Tag team wrestlers
    - Ranked AZM, Momo Watanabe, Saya Kamitani and Utami Hayashishita No. 20 in the PWI Tag Team's 50 in 2020
- Tokyo Sports
  - Newcomer Award (2018) – Utami Hayashishita
  - Women's Wrestling Grand Prize
    - (2016, 2017) – Io Shirai
    - (2021) – Utami Hayashishita
- World Wonder Ring Stardom
  - Artist of Stardom Championship (5 times) – AZM, HZK and Io Shirai (2); AZM, Momo Watanabe and Utami Hayashishita (1); HZK, Io Shirai and Momo Watanabe (1); HZK, Io Shirai and Viper (1)
  - Future of Stardom Championship (1 time) – Utami Hayashishita
  - Goddesses of Stardom Championship (4 times) – Bea Priestley and Jamie Hayter (1), (Note: Hayter was not part of Queen's Quest by the time she won the titles with Priestley.) Momo Watanabe and Utami Hayashishita (1) and Saya Kamitani and Utami Hayashishita (2)
  - High Speed Championship (3 times) – AZM (2) and Saya Kamitani
  - SWA World Championship (2 times) – Utami Hayashishita (1) and Viper (1)
  - Wonder of Stardom Championship (3 times) – Io Shirai (1), Momo Watanabe (1) and Saya Kamitani (1)
  - World of Stardom Championship (3 times) – Bea Priestley (1), Io Shirai (1) and Utami Hayashishita (1)
  - Cinderella Tournament
    - (2018) – Momo Watanabe
    - (2021) – Saya Kamitani
  - Goddesses of Stardom Tag League
    - (2018) – Momo Watanabe and Utami Hayashishita
    - (2020) – MOMOAZ
  - Rookie of Stardom (2018) – Utami Hayashishita
  - 5★Star GP (2020) – Utami Hayashishita
  - 5★Star GP Awards
    - Best Match Award (2016) – Io Shirai vs. Mayu Iwatani on December 22
    - Blue Stars Best Match Award
      - (2020) – Syuri vs. Utami Hayashishita on September 19
      - (2022) – Saya Kamitani vs. Suzu Suzuki on September 11
    - Fighting Spirit Award (2022) – AZM
    - Outstanding Performance Award (2021) – AZM
  - Year-End Awards
    - Best Match Award
      - (2016) – Io Shirai vs. Mayu Iwatani
      - (2018) – Thunder Rock (Io Shirai and Mayu Iwatani) vs. Oedo Tai (Hazuki and Kagetsu)
      - (2020) – Mayu Iwatani vs. Utami Hayashishita
    - Best Tag Team Award
      - (2018) – Momo Watanabe and Utami Hayashishita
      - (2020) – AphrOditE
    - Best Technique Award
      - (2019, 2022) – AZM
      - (2021) – Saya Kamitani
    - MVP Award
      - (2016) – Io Shirai
      - (2018) – Momo Watanabe
      - (2021) – Utami Hayashishita
    - Outstanding Performance Award
      - (2018) – Utami Hayashishita
      - (2022) – Saya Kamitani
    - Best Unit Award
      - (2023)

== Luchas de Apuestas record ==
Winner (wager)	Loser (wager)	Location	Event	Date	Notes
Queen's Quest (AZM, Konami and Momo Watanabe) (mask) (Note: Even if partially going under masks, if AZM, Watanabe and Konami lost the match they must have given them up completely.)	Oedo Tai (HZK, Kagetsu and Natsu Sumire) (dance)	Yokohama, Japan	Stardom Glory Stars 2019 (Night 1)	April 13, 2019	
Oedo Tai (Starlight Kid, Konami, Ruaka and Saki Kashima) (mask) (Note: This was an eight-woman elimination tag team match in which Watanabe and Kid were their respective team's captains and if one of them lost they would be forced to join the enemy unit. Had Kid lost, she would have had to unmask.)	Queen's Quest (Momo Watanabe, Utami Hayashishita, Saya Kamitani and AZM) (leader)	Osaka, Japan	Osaka Super Wars	December 18, 2021	
