= Hazuki (wrestler) =

Japanese female professional wrestler

Hazuki 葉月
- Hazuki at Death Before Dishonor 2026

Personal information
- Born: Reo Hazuki; September 29, 1997 (age 28) Fukuoka, Japan

Professional wrestling career
- Ring names: Hazuki; HZK; Reo Hazuki; Shinba; Teotleco; World Tiger IV (II)
- Billed height: 155 cm (5 ft 1 in)
- Billed weight: 52 kg (115 lb)
- Trained by: Fuka Kakimoto
- Debut: July 6, 2014

Reo Hazuki (葉月レオ, Hazuki Reo; born September 29, 1997), better known by her ring name Hazuki, is a Japanese professional wrestler working for the World Wonder Ring Stardom promotion. She also appears for Stardom's partners Consejo Mundial de Lucha Libre and Spark Joshi Puroresu of America, where she is the current Spark Joshi World Champion in her first reign.

In Stardom, Hazuki is a former four-time Artist of Stardom Champion, three-time Goddesses of Stardom Champion and one-time High Speed Champion. Hazuki was also one of the winners of the 2021 Goddesses of Stardom Tag League.

== Professional wrestling career ==
=== World Wonder Ring Stardom (2014–2019) ===
==== Early career (2014–2016) ====
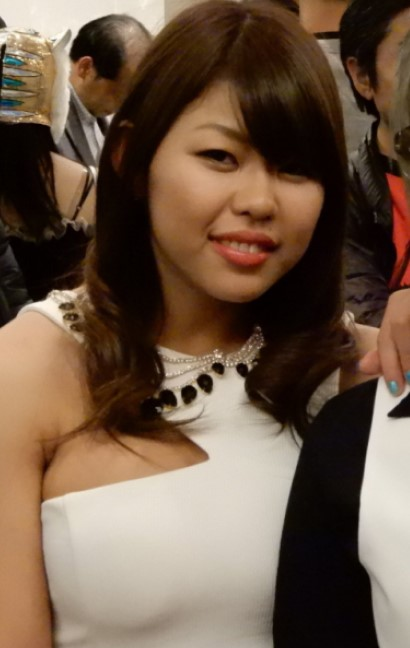
Hazuki in December 2018

Hazuki passed the test to become a wrestler for Stardom on July 5, 2014. On July 6, 2014, she debuted in a losing effort against Koguma. At Mask Fiesta 2014 on October 26, Hazuki, performing under the name Shinba, teamed up with Star Fire to defeat Mystique and Shadow. In December 2014, she won the Rookie of Stardom Tournament.

==== Queen's Quest (2016–2018) ====
On November 20, 2016, she changed her name to HZK and joined Queen's Quest after a 15-month hiatus.

Hazuki won the Artist of Stardom Championship at New Years Stars 2017 on January 7, 2017 with Io Shirai and Momo Watanabe by defeating Oedo Tai (Hana Kimura, Kagetsu and Kyoko Kimura). The Artist of Stardom Championship was vacated on April 9 due to Watanabe being sidelined with an injury, ending their reign after 92 days. Hazuki won the Artist of Stardom Championship again at Grows Up Stars 2017 on April 15, this time with AZM and Io Shirai, by defeating Oedo Tai (Hana Kimura, Kagetsu and La Rosa Negra). Hazuki, AZM and Shirai lost the Artist of Stardom Championship to Hiromi Mimura, Kairi Hojo and Konami at Golden Week Stars 2017 on May 6, ending their reign after 21 days. Hazuki won the Artist of Stardom Championship for a third time, again with AZM and Io Shirai, at Shining Stars 2017 on June 4 by defeating Hiromi Mimura, Kairi Hojo and Konami. Hazuki, AZM and Shirai lost the Artist of Stardom Championship to Team Jungle (Hiroyo Matsumoto, Jungle Kyona and Kaori Yoneyama) on June 17, ending their reign after 13 days.

==== Oedo Tai (2018–2019) ====
On April 15, 2018, at the 2018 Stardom Draft, she left Queen's Quest as she was drafted to Oedo Tai. On April 17, 2018, she changed her name from HZK to Hazuki. Hazuki competed in the 2018 5 Star Grand Prix. She scored a total of nine points, which was enough to tie with Mayu Iwatani for the lead of their block. However, Hazuki did not advance to the finals due to losing to Iwatani in their block match.

On December 24, 2018, she captured the High Speed Championship by defeating Mary Apache. She lost the title on July 20, 2019, to Death Yama-san in a three-way match that also involved AZM, ending her reign at 208 days.

At Stardom Cinderella Tournament 2019, Hazuki defeated Bea Priestley in the first rounds but fell short to Starlight Kid in the second rounds. On November 24, Hazuki announced her retirement from professional wrestling. Hazuki's final match took place on December 24, in which she lost to Natsuko Tora.

=== New Japan Pro-Wrestling (2019) ===
At New Japan Pro-Wrestling (NJPW) and Ring of Honor (ROH) promoted the G1 Supercard event, where she achieved her goal by having a match in the Madison Square Garden. She worked with Jenny Rose and Kagetsu to defeat Hana Kimura, Stella Grey and Sumie Sakai.

=== Return to World Wonder Ring Stardom (2021–present) ===
On August 29, 2021, Hazuki made her professional wrestling return by confronting Mayu Iwatani after Iwatani's match with Lady C, taking issue with how outsiders have taken over World Wonder Ring Stardom during Hazuki's absence. It was announced that Hazuki would be making her official in-ring return at Osaka Dream Cinderella on October 9, where she would face Koguma. At the event, Hazuki succeeded in defeating Koguma, and after the main event, Hazuki came out and challenged Utami Hayashishita for the World of Stardom Championship.

Hazuki also joined Mayu Iwatani's stable, Stars. At Kawasaki Super Wars on November 3, Hazuki unsuccessfully challenged Hayashishita for the World of Stardom Championship. At Osaka Super Wars on December 18, Hazuki teamed up with Mayu Iwatani and Koguma and took part in a ¥10 Million Unit tournament, which was also for the Artist of Stardom Championship. They reached the finals, where they lost to the Artist of Stardom champions, MaiHimePoi, in a six-woman tag team ladder match.

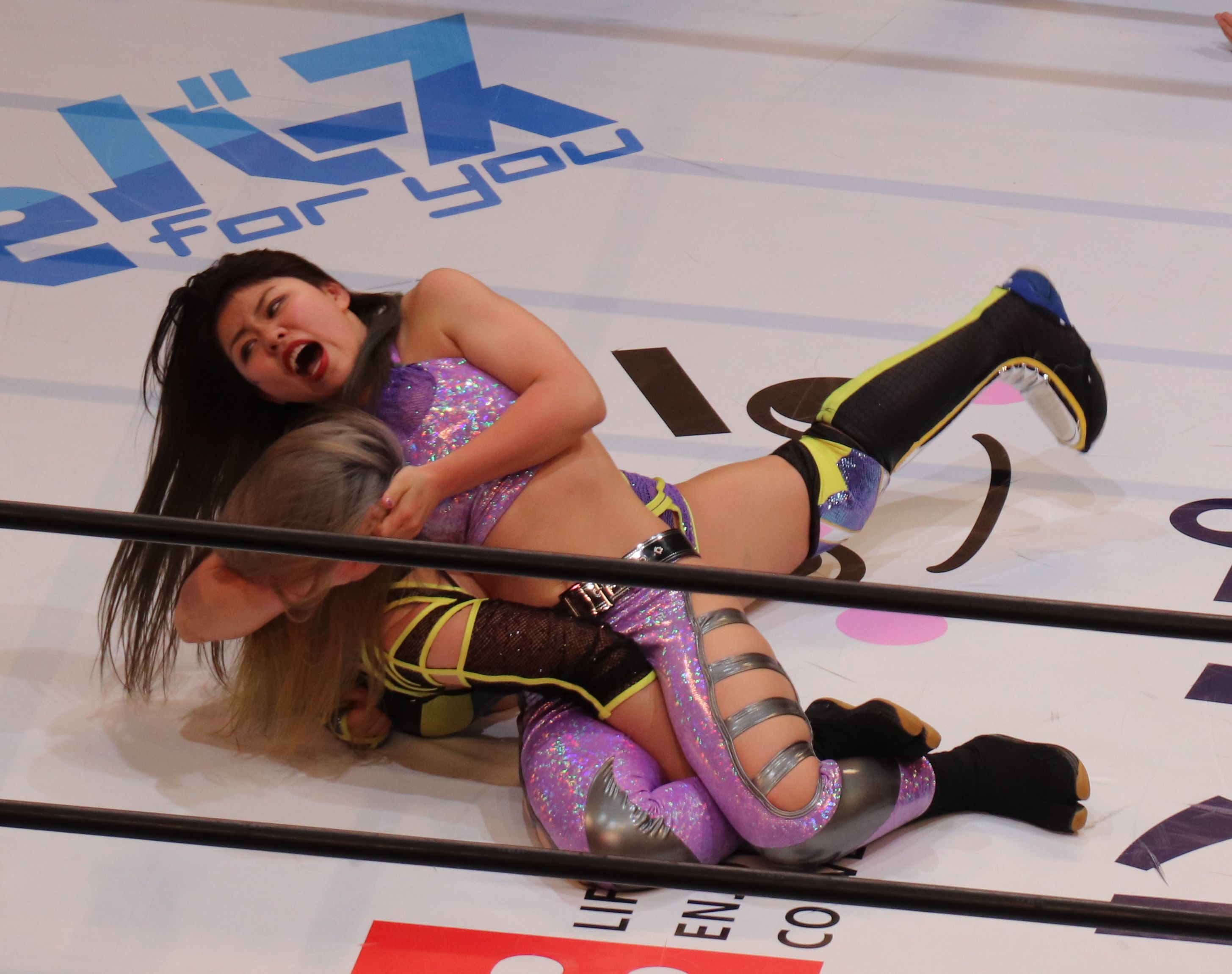
Hazuki facing Momo Watanabe on the second night of the Stardom World Climax 2022 on March 27.

On January 9, 2022, Hazuki and Koguma defeated Alto Livello Kabaliwan to win the Goddesses of Stardom Championship. At Nagoya Supreme Fight on January 29, Hazuki and Koguma scored their first successful defense against MaiHime. At Cinderella Journey on February 23, Hazuki and Koguma defended the titles again against Pink Kabuki. On the first night of the World Climax 2022 on March 26, Hazuki and Koguma lost the Goddesses of Stardom Championship to Black Desire. At the 2022 Cinderella Tournament, Hazuki made it to the semifinals where she lost to Koguma. At Golden Week Fight Tour on May 5, Hazuki and Koguma recaptured the Goddesses of Stardom Championship from Black Desire. At Flashing Champions, Hazuki and Koguma successfully defended the Goddesses of Stardom Championship against Mafia Bella. At Fight in the Top on June 26, Hazuki teamed up with Mayu Iwatani and Koguma to defeat Queen's Quest (Utami Hayashishita, AZM and Saya Kamitani) in one of Stardom's first steel cage matches. At Mid Summer Champions in Nagoya on July 24, Hazuki and Koguma defended the Goddesses of Stardom Championship against The New Eras. In the 2022 5 Star Grand Prix, Hazuki fought in the Blue Goddess block, where she scored a total of 14 points. At Stardom x Stardom: Nagoya Midsummer Encounter on August 21, Hazuki and Koguma lost the Goddesses of Stardom titles to meltear.

On March 4, 2023, at Triangle Derby I, Hazuki challenged Saya Kamitani for the Wonder of Stardom Championship, but was unsuccessful. On May 11, 2025, Hazuki and Koguma announced official departure from STARS, having to leave due to Iwatani’s departure from Stardom and pursuing new worldwide activities.

=== Return to NJPW (2022–present) ===
On November 20, 2022, Hazuki participated in the first NJPW and Stardom collaboration Historic X-Over, participating in a 15-woman Stardom Rambo match, which was won by Mairi. On April 8, 2023, at Sakura Genesis, Hazuki challenged the IWGP Women's Champion Mercedes Moné for the title in a three-way match that also involved AZM, but was unsuccessful.

=== All Elite Wrestling (2026–present) ===
On May 13, 2026, Hazuki was announced as a participant in All Elite Wrestling (AEW)'s Owen Hart Cup tournament. Hazuki would make her AEW debut on the May 30 episode of Collision, defeating Maya World. On the June 6 episode of Collision, after Hazuki defeated Persephone to advance to the semi-final, and was eliminated by Mercedes Moné in the semifinal on the June 17 episode of Dynamite.

== Personal life ==
Hazuki grew up as a WWE fan, naming the likes of CM Punk, John Cena, Kelly Kelly, Nikki Bella, and Randy Orton among of her favorite wrestlers.

== Championships and accomplishments ==
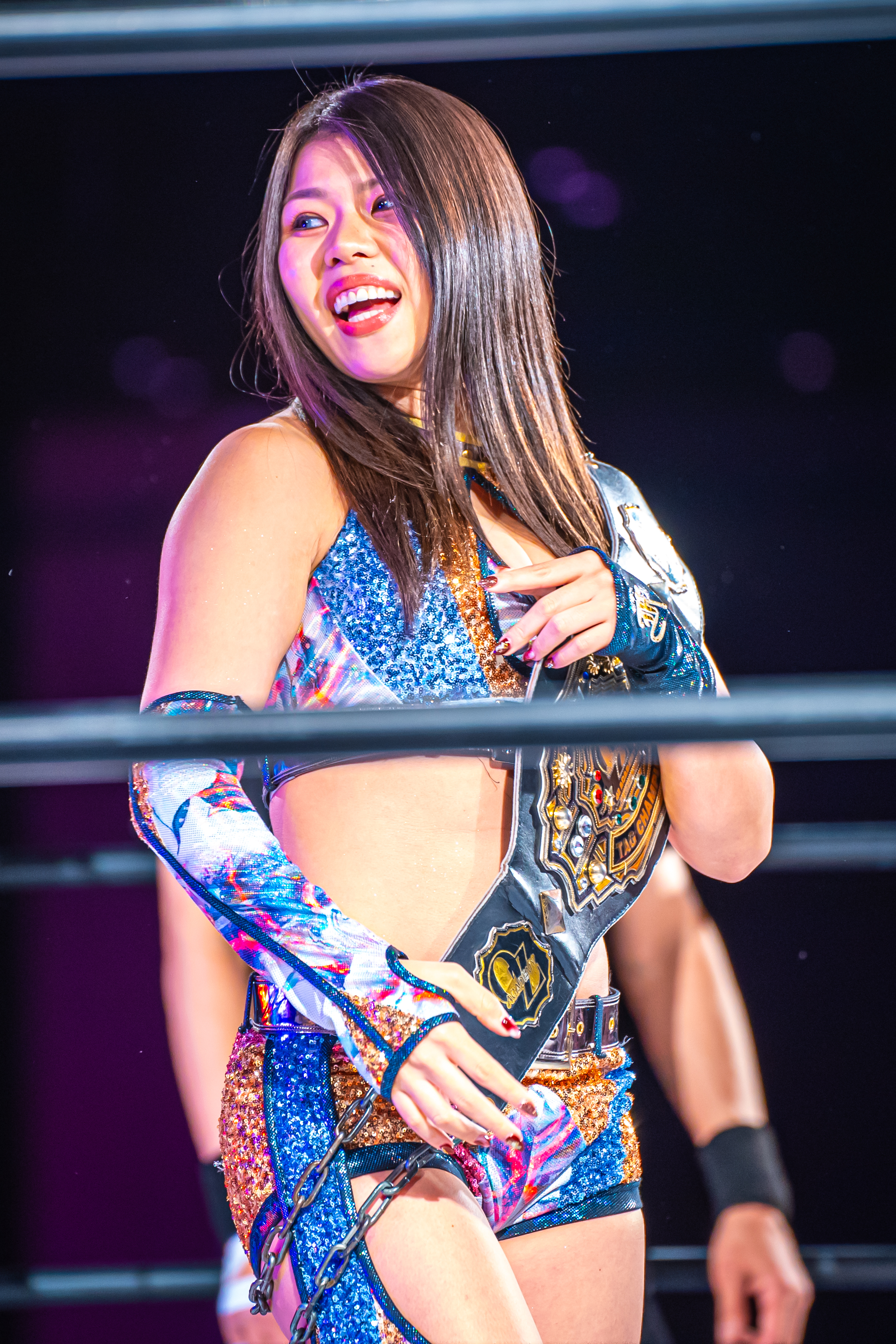
Hazuki is a former one-time Oz Academy Tag Team Champion.

- Oz Academy
  - Oz Academy Tag Team Championship (1 time) – with Koguma
- Consejo Mundial de Lucha Libre
  - CMLL Japanese Women's Championship (1 time)
- Pro Wrestling Illustrated
  - Ranked No. 5 in the PWI Tag Team 100 in 2022 – with Koguma
  - Ranked No. 83 of the top 250 female wrestlers in the PWI Women's 250 in 2025
- Pro Wrestling Wave
  - Catch the Wave Award (1 time)
    - Technique Award (2025)
- Spark Joshi Puroresu of America
  - Spark Joshi World Championship (1 time, current)
- World Wonder Ring Stardom
  - Artist of Stardom Championship (4 times) – with Io Shirai and AZM (2), Io Shirai and Momo Watanabe (1), Io Shirai and Viper (1)
  - Goddesses of Stardom Championship (3 times) – with Koguma
  - High Speed Championship (1 time)
  - Goddesses of Stardom Tag League (2021) – with Koguma
  - Moneyball Tournament (2022) – with Koguma and Mayu Iwatani
  - Stardom Rookie of the Year (2014)
  - 5★Star GP Awards
    - Red Stars Best Match Award (2023) vs. Suzu Suzuki on September 23
    - Technique Award (2018)
    - Red Stars Best Match Award (2024) vs. Maika on August 23 in Red Stars A
  - Stardom Year-End Awards
    - Best Match Award (2018) with Kagetsu vs. Io Shirai and Mayu Iwatani on June 17
    - Best Tag Team Award (2021) with Koguma
    - Best Unit Award (2022) as part of Stars
