= Lady C (wrestler) =

Japanese professional wrestler (born 1994)

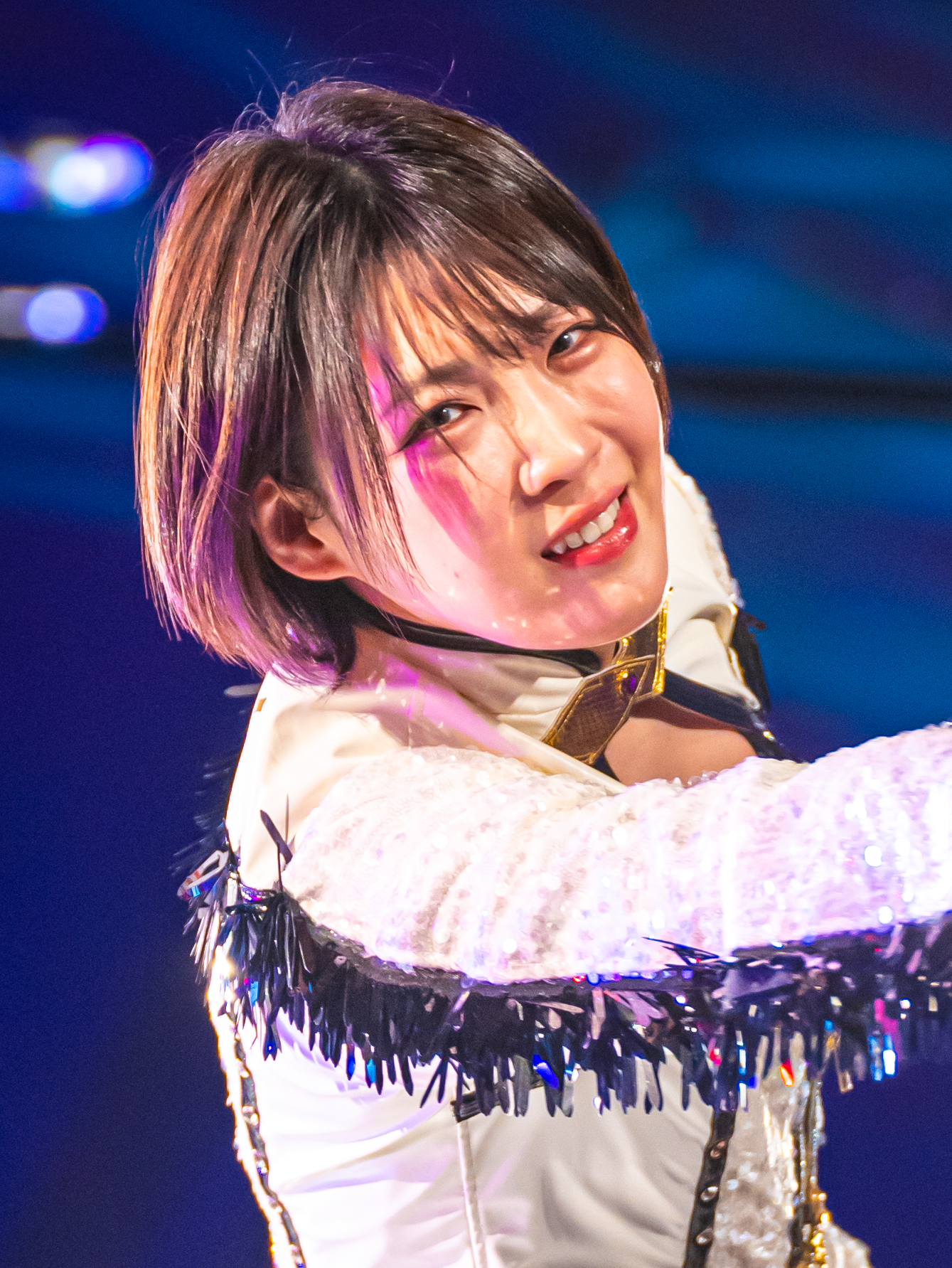
- Lady C in January 2025

Personal information
- Born: Chie Nagatani; November 17, 1994 (age 31) Ichikawa, Chiba, Japan

Professional wrestling career
- Ring names: Lady C; Super Strong Giant Machine
- Billed height: 177 cm (5 ft 10 in)
- Billed weight: 72 kg (159 lb)
- Trained by: World Wonder Ring Stardom; Tajiri
- Debut: November 14, 2020

Chie Nagatani (永谷千恵, Nagatani Chie; born November 17, 1994), better known by her ring name Lady C (レディ・Ｃ), is a Japanese professional wrestler, signed to World Wonder Ring Stardom. She is a member of God's Eye and a former Artist of Stardom Champion.

== Professional wrestling career ==
=== World Wonder Ring Stardom (2020–present) ===
==== Early career (2020-2021) ====
Lady C made her professional wrestling debut in World Wonder Ring Stardom on November 14, 2020, where she lost to Saya Iida.

At All Star Dream Cinderella on March 3, 2021, Lady C competed in a 24-women Stardom All Star Rumble featuring superstars from Stardom's past and present. Lady C took part in a Future of Stardom Championship tournament on May 15, where she lost to Unagi Sayaka in the first round. Lady C pulled the first win of her career on the fifteenth night of the 2021 5Star Grand Prix from September 20 where she defeated Waka Tsukiyama in one of Tsukiyama's rookie series of matches. At Stardom 10th Anniversary Grand Final Osaka Dream Cinderella on October 9, Lady C teamed up with Waka Tsukiyama in a losing effort against Oedo Tai (Saki Kashima and Rina). Lady C participated in the 2021 Goddesses of Stardom Tag League with Waka Tsukiyama as C Moon, in which they did not score any points. At Kawasaki Super Wars on November 3, Lady C unsuccessfully challenged Ruaka for the Future of Stardom Championship.

==== Queen's Quest (2022-2024) ====
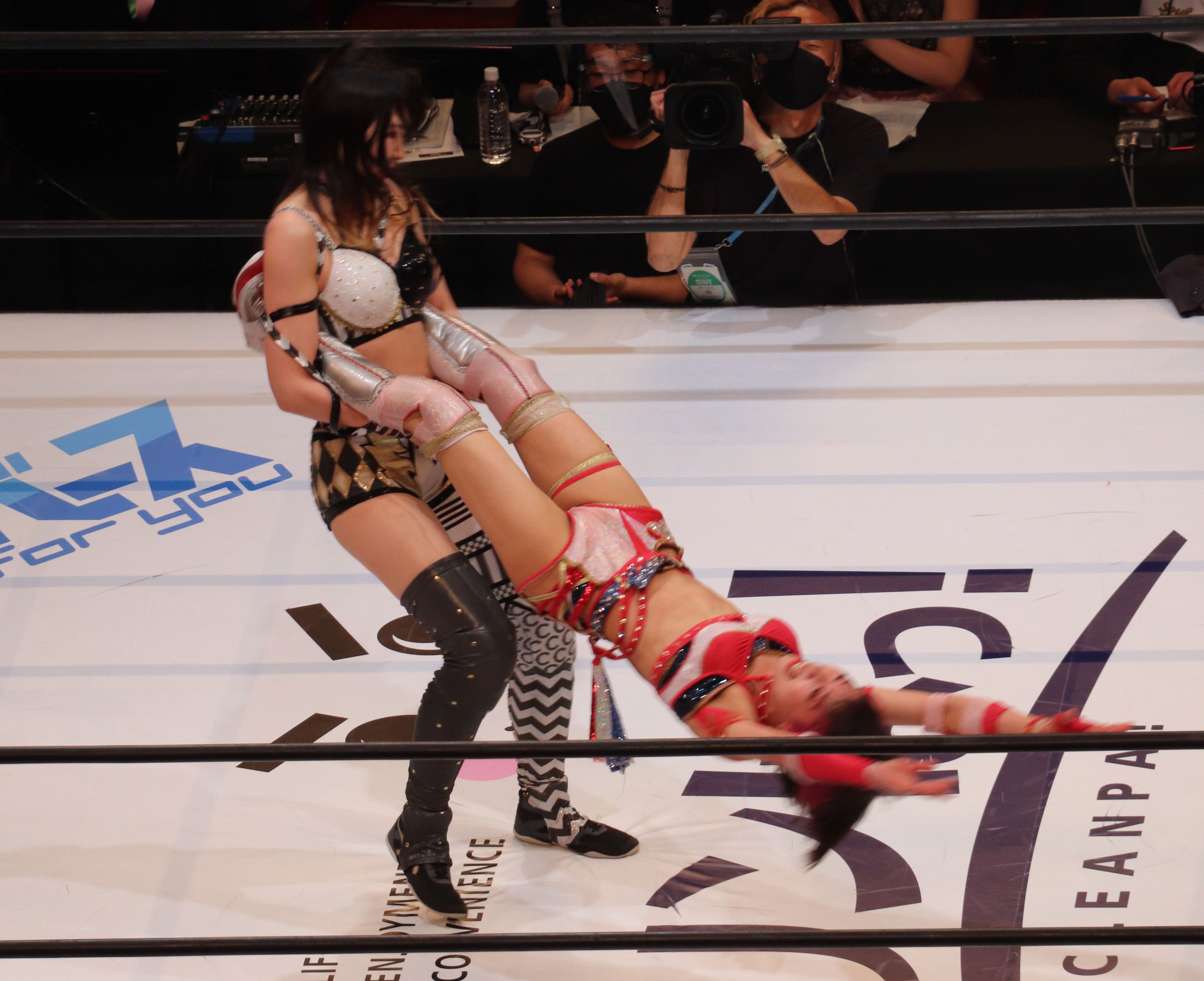
Nagatani performing her signature "swing" on Momo Kohgo on the first night of the Stardom World Climax 2022 from March 26.

At Stardom Award in Shinjuku on January 3, 2022, AZM, Saya Kamitani and Utami Hayashishita engaged in a brawl with Oedo Tai after their match against Fukigen Death, Saki Kashima and Ruaka. Obviously outnumbered, the three members of Queen's Quest received help from Lady C who rushed down the ring to try to save them. After Oedo Tai retreated, Hayashishita offered C a spot into the unit which the latter accepted so she was later announced to join the stable in the process. At Stardom Nagoya Supreme Fight on January 29, 2022, Nagatani unsuccessfully challenged Hanan for the Future of Stardom Championship. At Stardom Cinderella Journey on February 23, 2022, she teamed up with stablemate Utami Hayashishita in a losing effort against Oedo Tai's Momo Watanabe and Ruaka. At Stardom New Blood 1 on March 11, 2022, she teamed up with stablemate Saya Kamitani and went into a time-limit draw against Donna Del Mondo's Mirai and Maika. On the first night of the Stardom World Climax 2022 from March 26, Nagatani participated in a gauntlet match where she teamed up with her stablemates AZM and Miyu Amasaki. On the second night from March 27, she participated in a 18-women Cinderella Rumble match won by Mei Suruga and also involving certain wrestlers from out of Stardom such as Tomoka Inaba, Aoi, Haruka Umesaki, Nanami, Maria, Ai Houzan, and Yuna Mizumori. At the 2022 edition of the Stardom Cinderella Tournament, Nagatani fell short to Mai Sakurai in the first rounds from April 3. At Stardom Golden Week Fight Tour on May 5, 2022, she teamed up with Utami Hayashishita and AZM in a losing effort against Tam Nakano, Mina Shirakawa and Unagi Sayaka as a result of a six-woman tag team match. At Stardom New Blood 2 on May 13, 2022, Nagatani fell short to Yuna Mizumori in a singles match. At Stardom Flashing Champions on May 28, she teamed up with Saya Iida and Momo Kohgo to defeat Ami Sourei, Rina and Hina.

=== New Japan Pro Wrestling (2021–2022) ===
Lady C was part of the series of exhibition matches to promote female talent hosted by New Japan Pro Wrestling. On the first night of the Wrestle Grand Slam in MetLife Dome from September 4, 2021, where she teamed up with Maika in a losing effort to Queen's Quest (Momo Watanabe and Saya Kamitani). On November 20, 2022, Lady C participated in the first NJPW and Stardom collaboration Historic X-Over, where she alongside AZM and Saya Kamitani representing Queen's Quest, defeated Himeka, Mai Sakurai and Thekla, who represented Donna Del Mondo.

== Personal life ==
Prior to becoming a professional wrestler, Nagatani worked as a middle and high school economics teacher. One of her initial dreams was to become a fashion designer, so she enrolled in a university (the name unknown) and obtained a degree in vestimentar design and a teaching license.

== Championships and accomplishments ==
- World Wonder Ring Stardom
  - Artist of Stardom Championship (1 time) - with Ami Sohrei and Hina
  - Stardom Rambo (2022) shared with Super Strong Stardom Machine
  - Stardom Year-End Award (1 times)
    - Best Unit Award (2023) - as a part of Queen's Quest
