= Stardom Gold Rush =

2022 World Wonder Ring Stardom event

- Promotional poster of the event featuring various wrestlers
- Promotion: World Wonder Ring Stardom
- Date: November 19, 2022
- City: Osaka, Japan
- Venue: Edion Arena Osaka
- Attendance: 1,620

Event chronology
← Previous; Hiroshima Goddess Festival	Next → Historic X-Over

Gold Rush chronology
← Previous; First	Next → 2023

Stardom Gold Rush (スターダムゴールドラッシュ, Sutādamugōrudorasshu) was a professional wrestling event promoted by World Wonder Ring Stardom. The event took place on November 19, 2022, in Osaka at the Edion Arena Osaka with limited attendance due in part to the ongoing COVID-19 pandemic at the time.

== Production ==
=== Background ===
The show featured nine professional wrestling matches that resulted from scripted storylines, where wrestlers portrayed villains, heroes, or less distinguishable characters in the scripted events that built tension and culminated in a wrestling match or series of matches. The event's press conference was broadcast live on Stardom's YouTube channel on November 8, 2022.

=== Event ===
The two preshow matches were broadcast live on Stardom's YouTube channel. In the first one, Natsuko Tora & Ruaka picked up a victory over Lady C & Miyu Amasaki and Saya Iida & Momo Kohgo. In the second one, AZM successfully defended the High Speed Championship for the eighth consecutive time against Momoka Hanazono. The first main card match saw Giulia, Thekla & Mai Sakurai picking up a victory over Tam Nakano, Natsupoi & Waka Tsukiyama in the first rounds of a "Moneyball Tournament". The other first-round match presented Mayu Iwatani, Hazuki & Koguma also advancing over Mirai, Future of Stardom Champion Ami Sourei & Tomoka Inaba. In the fifth match, two-thirds of the Artist of Stardom Champions Momo Watanabe & Starlight Kid defeated other third of the artist champions Saki Kashima & Fukigen Death to secure two points in the 2022 edition of the Tag League. Maika & Himeka also scored additional two points in the tag league by defeating Nanae Takahashi & Yuu. The seventh match saw Saya Kamitani successfully defending the Wonder of Stardom Championship for the eleventh consecutive time after going into a time-limit draw against Kairi, concluding a rescheduled match which Kairi was initially meant to have at Stardom x Stardom: Nagoya Midsummer Encounter on August 21, 2022 but needed to pull out due to COVID issues. The semi-main event saw Syuri defending the World of Stardom Championship for the tenth time in a row against Utami Hayashishita. After the match, Giulia came down to the ring to remind Syuri about their match at Dream Queendom on December 29.

The main event portrayed the confrontation between Stars (Mayu Iwatani, Hazuki & Koguma) and Donna Del Mondo (Giulia, Thekla & Mai Sakurai) in a Tables, ladders & chairs match in which a plastic ball full of money was suspended over the ring. Hazuki & Iwatani succeeded in grabbing the money and winning the match.

== Matches ==
No.	Results	Stipulations	Times
1^{P}	Oedo Tai (Natsuko Tora and Ruaka) defeated Queen's Quest (Lady C and Miyu Amasaki) and Stars (Momo Kohgo and Saya Iida)	Three-way tag team match	4:31
2^{P}	AZM (c) defeated Momoka Hanazono	Singles match for the High Speed Championship	8:04
3	Donna Del Mondo (Giulia, Mai Sakurai and Thekla) defeated Cosmic Angels (Natsupoi, Tam Nakano and Waka Tsukiyama)	Moneyball tournament first round match	8:42
4	Stars (Hazuki, Koguma and Mayu Iwatani) defeated God's Eye (Ami Sourei, Mirai and Tomoka Inaba)	Moneyball tournament first round match	10:05
5	Black Desire (Momo Watanabe and Starlight Kid) defeated We Love Tokyo Sports (Fukigen Death and Saki Kashima)	Goddesses of Stardom Tag League group stage match	5:47
6	MaiHime (Himeka and Maika) defeated 7Upp (Nanae Takahashi and Yuu)	Goddesses of Stardom Tag League group stage match	14:05
7	Saya Kamitani (c) vs. Kairi ended in a time-limit draw	Singles match for the Wonder of Stardom Championship	30:00
8	Syuri (c) defeated Utami Hayashishita	Singles match for the World of Stardom Championship	28:14
9	Stars (Hazuki, Koguma and Mayu Iwatani) defeated Donna Del Mondo (Giulia, Mai Sakurai and Thekla)	Six-woman tag team Tables, Ladders, and Chairs match in the Moneyball tournament final	9:58
(c) / – the champion(s) heading into the match; P / – the match was broadcast on the pre-show
