= Hiroshima Goddess Festival =

2022 World Wonder Ring Stardom event

- Promotional poster featuring various wrestlers
- Promotion: World Wonder Ring Stardom
- Date: November 3, 2022
- City: Hiroshima, Japan
- Venue: Hiroshima Sun Plaza
- Attendance: 1,045

Event chronology
| ← Previous; New Blood 5 | Next → Gold Rush 2022 |

Hiroshima Goddess Festival (広島女神まつり, Hiroshima megami matsuri) was a professional wrestling event promoted by World Wonder Ring Stardom. The event took place on November 3, 2022, in Hiroshima at the Hiroshima Sun Plaza with limited attendance due in part to the ongoing COVID-19 pandemic at the time.

Nine matches were contested at the event, including two on the pre-show, and four of Stardom's seven championships were on the line. The main event saw Syuri defeat Maika to retain the World of Stardom Championship. In other prominent matches, Saya Kamitani successfully retained the Wonder of Stardom Championship against Mina Shirakawa, and Mayu Iwatani defeated Alpha Female to retain the SWA World Championship.

== Production ==
=== Background ===
The show featured nine professional wrestling matches that resulted from scripted storylines, where wrestlers portrayed villains, heroes, or less distinguishable characters in the scripted events that built tension and culminated in a wrestling match or series of matches. The event's press conference was held on October 3, 2022, and was broadcast live on Stardom's YouTube channel.

=== Event ===
The first preshow match was broadcast live on Stardom's YouTube channel. The High Speed Champion AZM defeated Queen's Quest stablemates Lady C and Miyu Amasaki, Waka Tsukiyama, and Saya Iida. In the second match, Hazuki & Koguma defeated Ruaka & one-third of the Artist of Stardom Champions Saki Kashima. The first main card match saw Himeka picking up a win over Yuna Mizumori. The fourth bout portrayed Utami Hayashishita defeating Natsuko Tora in a "revenge match" over the latter's injury she sustained on July 4, 2021 at Stardom Yokohama Dream Cinderella. The next match saw God's Eye's Ami Sourei, Mirai, and a returning Konami going into a time-limit draw against Donna Del Mondo's Giulia, Thekla & Mai Sakurai. In the sixth match, Mayu Iwatani defeated Alpha Female to retain the SWA World Championship for the third time in a row. After the match, Iwatani relinquished the title to concentrate on the IWGP Women's Championship match from Historic X-Over on November 20, 2022. Next, Tam Nakano & Natsupoi marked their second consecutive defense over the Goddesses of Stardom Championship against Momo Watanabe & Starlight Kid. In the eighth match, Saya Kamitani defeated Mina Shirakawa to retain the Wonder of Stardom Championship for the tenth time in a row. After the match, Saya nominated Kairi as her opponent for her next defense of the Wonder Championship at the Gold Rush 2022 pay-per-view on November 19, 2022.

The main event saw Syuri defeating Maika to retain the World of Stardom Championship in her ninth defense as champion. After the match, Utami Hayashishita came out and announced herself as Syuri's next challenger. And that match will happen at the Gold Rush pay-per-view on November 19, 2022.

== Results ==
| No. | Results | Stipulations | Times |
|---|---|---|---|
| 1^{P} | AZM defeated Lady C, Miyu Amasaki, Saya Iida, and Waka Tsukiyama | Five-way match | 5:43 |
| 2^{P} | FWC (Hazuki and Koguma) defeated Oedo Tai (Ruaka and Saki Kashima) | Tag team match | 6:49 |
| 3 | Himeka defeated Yuna Mizumori | Singles match | 7:41 |
| 4 | Utami Hayashishita defeated Natsuko Tora | Singles match | 12:50 |
| 5 | Donna Del Mondo (Giulia, Mai Sakurai and Thekla) vs. God's Eye (Ami Sourei, Konami and Mirai) ended in a time-limit draw | Six-woman tag team match | 15:00 |
| 6 | Mayu Iwatani (c) defeated Alpha Female | Singles match for the SWA World Championship | 11:07 |
| 7 | meltear (Natsupoi and Tam Nakano) (c) defeated Black Desire (Momo Watanabe and Starlight Kid) | Tag team match for the Goddesses of Stardom Championship | 15:22 |
| 8 | Saya Kamitani (c) defeated Mina Shirakawa | Singles match for the Wonder of Stardom Championship | 20:35 |
| 9 | Syuri (c) defeated Maika | Singles match for the World of Stardom Championship | 25:56 |
(c) / – the champion(s) heading into the match; P / – the match was broadcast on the pre-show
