= Stardom New Blood 4 =

2022 World Wonder Ring Stardom event

New Blood 4
- Promotion: World Wonder Ring Stardom
- Date: August 26, 2022
- City: Tokyo, Japan
- Venue: Shinagawa Intercity Hall
- Attendance: 400

Event chronology
← Previous; Stardom x Stardom: Nagoya Midsummer Encounter	Next → Stardom in Showcase vol.2

New Blood chronology
← Previous; New Blood 3	Next → New Blood 5

Stardom New Blood 4 (Japanese: スターダムニューブラッド3, Hepburn: Sutādamunyūburaddo 4) was a professional wrestling event promoted by World Wonder Ring Stardom. The event took place on August 26, 2022, in Tokyo, Japan at the Shinagawa Intercity Hall, with a limited attendance due in part to the ongoing COVID-19 pandemic at the time.

Seven matches were contested at the event. The main event saw Tam Nakano defeat Miyu Amasaki. In another prominent match, Hanan successfully retained the Future of Stardom Championship against Aoi.

== Production ==
=== Background ===
The "New Blood" is a series of events which mainly focus on matches where rookie wrestlers, usually with three or less years of in-ring experience, evolve. Besides wrestlers from Stardom, various superstars from multiple promotions of the Japanese independent scene are invited to compete in bouts that are usually going under the stipulation of singles or tag team matches.

The show featured seven professional wrestling matches that resulted from scripted storylines, where wrestlers portrayed villains, heroes, or less distinguishable characters in the scripted events that built tension and culminated in a wrestling match or series of matches. The event's press conference took place on August 3, 2022, and was broadcast live on Stardom's YouTube channel.

=== Event ===
The entire event was broadcast live on Stardom's YouTube channel. In the first match, JTO's Tomoka Inaba picked up a victory over Queen's Quest's Hina. In the second match, Oedo Tai's Ruaka defeated Lady C and Gatoh Move Pro Wrestling's Chie Koishikawa in a three-way match. The third match saw Ram Kaicho & Rina defeating Momoka Hanazono & Waka Tsukiyama. After the match, Kaicho challenged AZM for the High Speed Championship at the next New Blood event. Hanazono also stepped up to the challenge to make it a three-way match. The fourth match saw Mai Sakurai & Linda defeating Stars' Saya Iida & Momo Kohgo. The fifth match saw God's Eye's (Mirai & Ami Sourei) defeating Starlight Kid & Haruka Umesaki via disqualification when Umesaki assaulted Mirai with a steel chair in front of the referee. After the match, Oedo Tai attacked God's Eye until Tomoka Inaba came to the ring for the save. Syuri and Inaba then shook hands as Inaba became the newest member of God's Eye. The sixth match saw Hanan successfully defending the Future of Stardom Championship for the tenth time in a row against Aoi. After the match, Ami Sourei challenged Hanan for the Future of Stardom Championship at the next New Blood event.

The show concluded with Tam Nakano defeating Miyu Amasaki in a singles match as the result of the main event.

== Results ==
No.	Results	Stipulations	Times
1	Tomoka Inaba defeated Hina	Singles match	10:50
2	Ruaka defeated Chie Koishikawa and Lady C	Three-way match	7:02
3	Ram Kaicho and Rina (with Maika Ozaki and Maya Yukihi) defeated Momoka Hanazono and Waka Tsukiyama	Tag team match	10:36
4	Linda and Mai Sakurai defeated Stars (Momo Kohgo and Saya Iida)	Tag team match	6:37
5	God's Eye (Ami Sourei and Mirai) defeated Haruka Umesaki and Starlight Kid by disqualification	Tag team match	12:07
6	Hanan (c) defeated Aoi	Singles match for the Future of Stardom Championship	9:25
7	Tam Nakano defeated Miyu Amasaki	Singles match	14:00
(c) / – the champion(s) heading into the match
