= Stardom x Stardom: Nagoya Midsummer Encounter =

2022 World Wonder Ring Stardom event

- Promotional poster featuring Syuri, Nanae Takahashi, Saya Kamitani and Kairi
- Promotion: World Wonder Ring Stardom
- Date: August 21, 2022
- City: Nagoya, Japan
- Venue: Aichi Prefectural Gymnasium
- Attendance: 1,353

Event chronology
← Previous; Stardom 5 Star Grand Prix 2022	Next → New Blood 4

Stardom x Stardom chronology
← Previous; First	Next → Osaka Summer Team

Stardom x Stardom: Nagoya Midsummer Encounter (スターダム×スターダム 名古屋真夏の邂逅, Sutādamu × sutādamu Nagoya manatsu no kaigō) was a professional wrestling event promoted by World Wonder Ring Stardom. The event took place on August 21, 2022, in Nagoya, Japan at the Aichi Prefectural Gymnasium with a limited attendance due in part to the ongoing COVID-19 pandemic at the time.

Eight matches were contested at the event, including one on the pre-show, and five of Stardom's seven championships were on the line. The main event saw Syuri defeat Nanae Takahashi to retain the World of Stardom Championship. In other prominent matches, Saya Kamitani successfully retained the Wonder of Stardom Championship against Himeka (Kairi's replacement), and Cosmic Angels (Natsupoi and Tam Nakano) defeated FWC (Hazuki and Koguma) to win the Goddesses of Stardom Championship.

== Production ==
=== Background ===
The show featured eight professional wrestling matches that resulted from scripted storylines, where wrestlers portrayed villains, heroes, or less distinguishable characters in the scripted events that built tension and culminated in a wrestling match or series of matches. The event's press conference took place on August 3, 2022, and was broadcast live on Stardom's YouTube channel.

=== Event ===
New Japan Pro Wrestling's El Desperado and Taichi were presented as guest commentators for the night. The preshow match in which Hanan defended the Future of Stardom Championship for the ninth time in a row against Miyu Amasaki was broadcast live on Stardom's YouTube channel. The first match of the main card saw Maika picking up a victory over Hina. Maika was initially scheduled to team up with Himeka to face Giulia & Mai Sakurai in a tag match, but since Kairi was sidelined due to COVID issues, Himeka replaced the latter in the Wonder of Stardom Championship against Saya Kamitani, leaving Maika to be rescheduled into another match. The third match was also redesigned as Mirai & Ami Sourei faced Giulia & Mai Sakurai and Rina & Ruaka in a successful effort. The fourth match presented Utami Hayashishita, Lady C and the High Speed Champion AZM taking a victory over the SWA World Champion Mayu Iwatani, Momo Kohgo and Saya Iida. In the fifth match, Saki Kashima, Momo Watanabe & Momo Watanabe successfully defended the Artist of Stardom Championship for the third time in a row against Unagi Sayaka, Mina Shirakawa & Saki. The sixth match saw Tam Nakano & Natsupoi defeating Hazuki & Koguma to win the Goddesses of Stardom Championship. Mirai & Ami Sourei stepped up to challenge them for the titles at a show from September 11, 2022. Next, Saya Kamitani defeated Himeka to mark her ninth defense of the Wonder of Stardom Championship.

The main event saw Syuri successfully defending the World of Stardom Championship for the eighth time in a row against the inaugural "red belt" champion, Nanae Takahashi.

== Results ==
No.	Results	Stipulations	Times
1^{P}	Hanan (c) defeated Miyu Amasaki	Singles match for the Future of Stardom Championship	6:31
2	Maika defeated Hina	Singles match	5:40
3	God's Eye (Ami Sourei and Mirai) defeated Donna Del Mondo (Giulia and Mai Sakurai) and Oedo Tai (Rina and Ruaka)	Three-way tag team match	8:00
4	Queen's Quest (AZM, Lady C and Utami Hayashishita) defeated Stars (Mayu Iwatani, Momo Kohgo and Saya Iida)	Six-woman elimination tag team match	8:58
5	Oedo Tai (Momo Watanabe, Saki Kashima and Starlight Kid) (c) defeated Cosmic Angels (Mina Shirakawa, Saki and Unagi Sayaka)	Six-woman tag team match for the Artist of Stardom Championship	11:11
6	Cosmic Angels (Natsupoi and Tam Nakano) defeated FWC (Hazuki and Koguma) (c)	Tag team match for the Goddesses of Stardom Championship	15:53
7	Saya Kamitani (c) defeated Himeka (Note: Initially, Kamitani was scheduled to defend against Kairi but the latter pulled out due to being tested positive for COVID.)	Singles match for the Wonder of Stardom Championship	20:20
8	Syuri (c) defeated Nanae Takahashi	Singles match for the World of Stardom Championship	25:24
(c) / – the champion(s) heading into the match; P / – the match was broadcast on the pre-show
