= God's Eye (professional wrestling) =

Professional wrestling stable

- Official logo of the unit since 2022

Stable
- Leader: Syuri
- Members: Ami Sohrei; Tomoka Inaba; Nanami; Ranna Yagami; Hina; Lady C; Kiyoka Kotatsu
- Former members: See below
- Debut: March 26, 2022
- Years active: 2022–present

God's Eye (神の目, Kami no me) is a professional wrestling stable, currently performing in the Japanese professional wrestling promotion World Wonder Ring Stardom. The stable is led by Syuri and also consists of Ami Sohrei, Lady C, Hina, Tomoka Inaba, Ranna Yagami, Kiyoka Kotatsu and Nanami.

== History ==
=== Formation ===
After winning the World of Stardom Championship from Utami Hayashishita at Stardom Dream Queendom on December 29, 2021, Syuri felt underrated as being a normal member of Donna Del Mondo. After several months, she showed her dissatisfaction to the leader Giulia and even broke up their "AliKaba" tag team on March 21, 2022, at Stardom in Nagoya, announcing that she wants her own path so she would hire herself a bodyguard. On the first night of the Stardom World Climax from March 26, 2022, after successfully defending the World of Stardom Championship against Giulia, Syuri officially resigned from Donna Del Mondo and revealed her new unit's official name as "God's Eye" and also revealing Ami Sourei as being her bodyguard and implicitly the stable's first member besides her.

=== Syuri's leadership (2022–present) ===
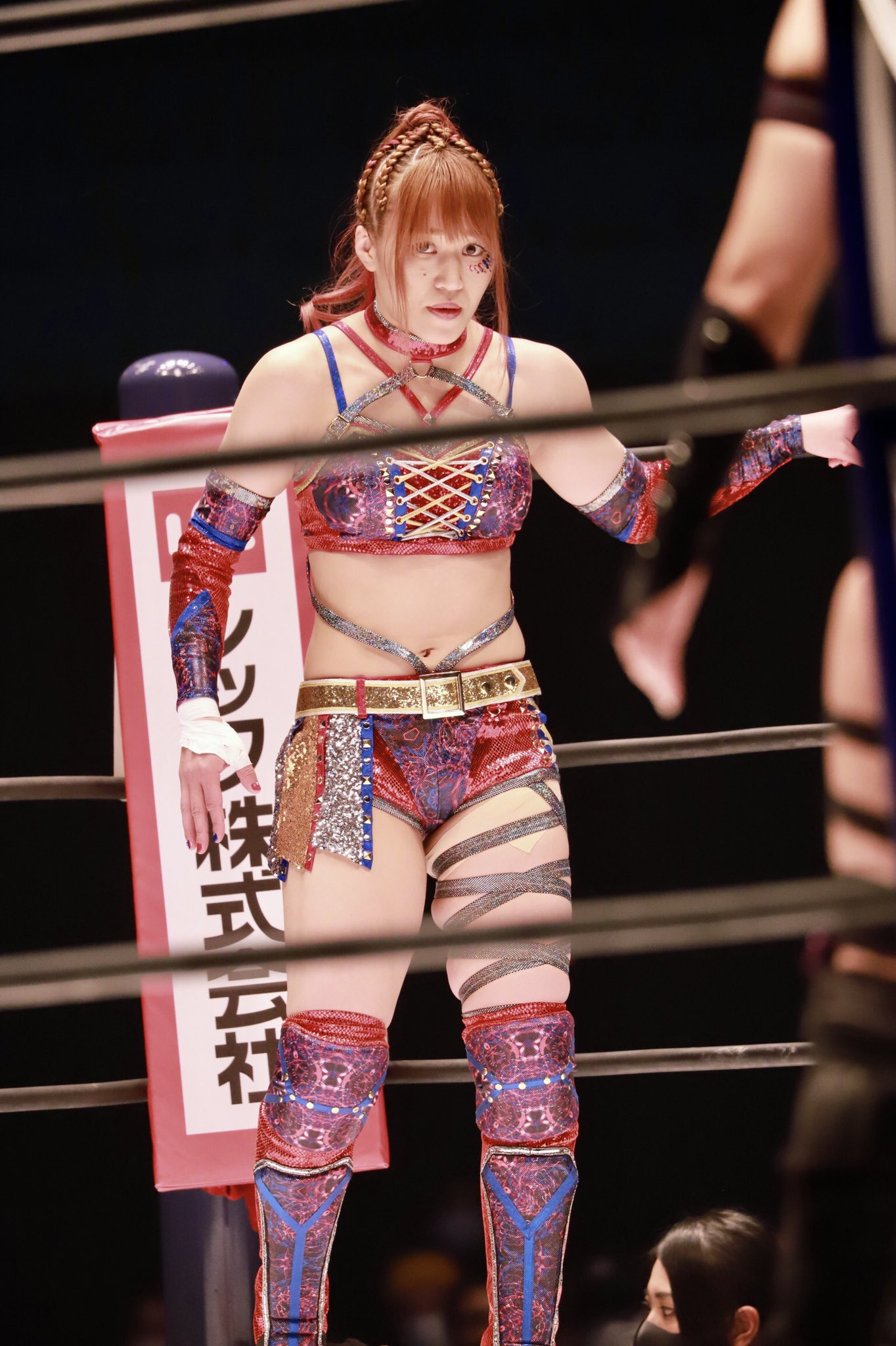
First and current leader of the stable, Syuri.

On the first night of the Stardom Cinderella Tournament 2022 from April 3, Syuri defeated Sourei in a first round tournament match, and after her victory, Mirai came out to announce her resignation from Donna Del Mondo and joining God's Eye. On the second night of the tournament from April 10, Ami Sourei and Mirai teamed up to defeat Oedo Tai's Saki Kashima and Ruaka. On the third night of the Tournament from April 17, Konami reached out via video message, announcing that they will be supporting God's Eye during the Stardom Golden Week Fight Tour. Ami Sourei and Mirai defeated freelancer Momoka Hanazono and Waka Tsukiyama at Stardom New Blood 2 on May 13, 2022. On the third night of the Cinderella Tournament from April 17, Mirai defeated Saki Kashima to advance into the semi-finals. On April 29, she succeeded in winning the 2022 edition of the tournament by defeating Koguma in the finals. On the first night of the Stardom Golden Week Tournament from May 1, 2022, Syuri, Mirai and Ami Sourei teamed up with a returning Konami to defeat Cosmic Angels (Tam Nakano, Unagi Sayaka, Mina Shirakawa and Waka Tsukiyama) in an eight-woman tag team match. Konami announced that her return is just brief and that she will act as an official member of God's Eye only until the May 7 show. At Stardom Golden Week Fight Tour on May 5, Syuri, Mirai, Ami Sourei and Konami defeated Donna Del Mondo's Giulia, Himeka, Natsupoi and Mai Sakurai. At Stardom Flashing Champions on May 28, 2022, Ami Sourei teamed up with Hina and Rina in a losing effort against Momo Kohgo, Saya Iida and Lady C, and Mirai unsuccessfully challenged Saya Kamitani for the Wonder of Stardom Championship. At Stardom Fight in the Top on June 26, 2022, Syuri, Ami Sourei and Mirai unsuccessfully challenged Oedo Tai's title holders Momo Watanabe, Starlight Kid and Saki Kashima, as well as the other group of challengers from Donna Del Mondo, Giulia, Maika and Mai Sakurai in a Three-way six-woman tag team match for the Artist of Stardom Championship. At Stardom New Blood 3 on July 8, 2022, Ami Sourei defeated Nanami, and Mirai went into a time-limit draw against Suzu Suzuki. At Mid Summer Champions in Tokyo, the first event of the Stardom Mid Summer Champions which took place on July 9, 2022, Mirai and Ami Sourei defeated Utami Hayashishita and Miyu Amasaki. At Stardom in Showcase vol.1 on July 23, 2022, Ami Sourei teamed up with Saya Iida unsuccessfully against Maika and Himeka, Mirai competed in a rumble match and made it into the last three, and Syuri defeated Prominence's Hiragi Kurumi in an "I quit" match. At Mid Summer Champions in Tokyo, the first event of the Stardom Mid Summer Champions which took place on July 9, 2022, Mirai and Ami Sourei defeated Utami Hayashishita & Miyu Amasaki. At Mid Summer Champions in Nagoya from July 24, 2022, Ami Sourei and Mirai unsuccessfully challenged Hazuki and Koguma for the Goddesses of Stardom Championship. At Stardom x Stardom: Nagoya Midsummer Encounter on August 21, 2022, Mirai and Ami Sourei defeated Giulia and Mai Sakurai, and Rina and Ruaka in a three-way match. At Stardom New Blood 4 on August 26, 2022, Mirai and Ami Sourei defeated Starlight Kid and Haruka Umesaki when the latter assaulted Mirai with a steel chair in front of the referee. After the match, Oedo Tai attacks God's Eye until Tomoka Inaba came to the ring for the save. Syuri and Inaba then shook hands as Inaba became the newest member of God's Eye. At Stardom in Showcase vol.2 on September 25, 2022, Syuri teamed up with Utami Hayashishita and Lady C as the Rossy Ogawa Bodyguard Army in a losing effort against Grim Reaper Army (Yuu, Nanae Takahashi & Yuna Manase). At Stardom New Blood 5 on October 19, 2022, Mirai, Tomoka Inaba and Nanami unsuccessfully faced Starlight Kid, Ruaka and Haruka Umesaki. Nanami, who was part of World Woman Pro-Wrestling Diana's roster was presented as the unit's new member. In the main event, Ami Sourei defeated Hanan to win the Future of Stardom Championship. At Hiroshima Goddess Festival on November 3, 2022, Konami returned and teamed up with Mirai and Ami Sourei, going into a time-limit draw against Giulia, Thekla and Mai Sakurai. In the main event, Syuri defended the World of Stardom Championship successfully against Maika. At Stardom Gold Rush on November 19, 2022, Ami Sourei, Mirai and Tomoka Inaba fell short to Giulia, Thekla and Mai Sakurai in a "Moneyball tournament". At Stardom in Showcase vol.3 on November 26, 2022, Mirai teamed up with Utami Hayashishita and Hina in a losing effort against Mayu Iwatani, Hanan and Maika as a result of a "judo rules match". At Stardom Dream Queendom 2 on December 29, 2022, Tomoka Inaba participated in a Stardom rambo, Ami Sourei and Mirai competed in a number one contendership for the Goddesses of Stardom Championship won by Maika and Himeka and also involving Ruaka and Natsuko Tora, and Syuri dropped the World of Stardom Championship to Giulia concluding their long term feud.

At Stardom New Blood 7 on January 20, 2023, Ami Sourei and Nanami defeated Momo Kohgo and Momoka Hanazono, and Tomoka Inaba and Mirai defeated Saya Iida and Hanan in the quarterfinals of the inaugural New Blood Tag Team Championship tournament. At Stardom Supreme Fight 2023 on February 4, 2023, Syuri, Konami and Ami Sourei defeated Utami Hayashishita, AZM and Lady C, and Mirai unsuccessfully fought Chihiro Hashimoto. At Sunshine 2023 on June 25, Oedo Tai was defeated by Queen's Quest in a six-on-six steel cage match in which the losing unit was forced to lose a member. Saki Kashima was the last member eliminated from Oedo Tai and was attacked by the other members of Oedo Tai and forced to withdraw from the unit. At Mid Summer Champions 2023 on July 2, Kashima successfully defended the High Speed Championship against Fukigen Death. After the match, Oedo Tai attacked Kashima again, but Syuri and Sourei rescued her and offered a spot in God's Eye, which Kashima accepted. On December 3, Scandinavian Hurricane joined the stable. At New Years Stars 2024 on January 3, 2024, Abarenbo GE participated in the 2024 Triangle Derby, in which they defeated Baribari Bombers in the finals to win the tournament and the Artist of Stardom Championship.

=== New Japan Pro Wrestling (2022-present) ===
Various members of the stable began participating in events promoted by New Japan Pro Wrestling. At Historic X-Over on November 20, 2022, Ami Sourei and Mirai participated in the Stardom Rambo which was won by the latter, and Syuri teamed up with Tom Lawlor in a losing effort against Giulia and Zack Sabre Jr. as a result of a mixed tag team match.

At Wrestle Kingdom 20 on January 4, 2026, Syuri defeated Saya Kamitani in a Winner Takes All match to win the Strong Women's Championship while also retaining the IWGP Women's Championship.

== Members ==
God's Eye
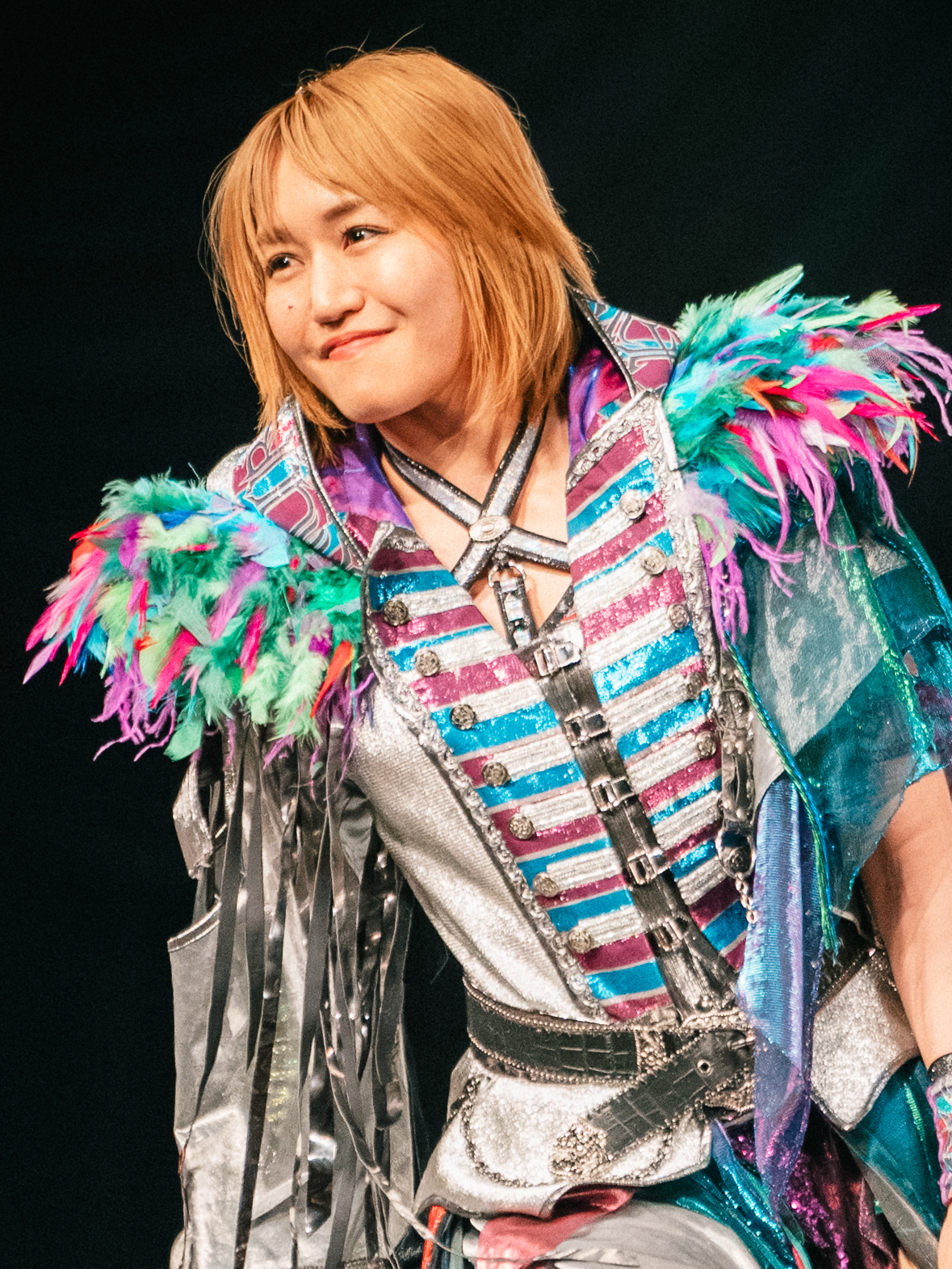
Syuri (I)

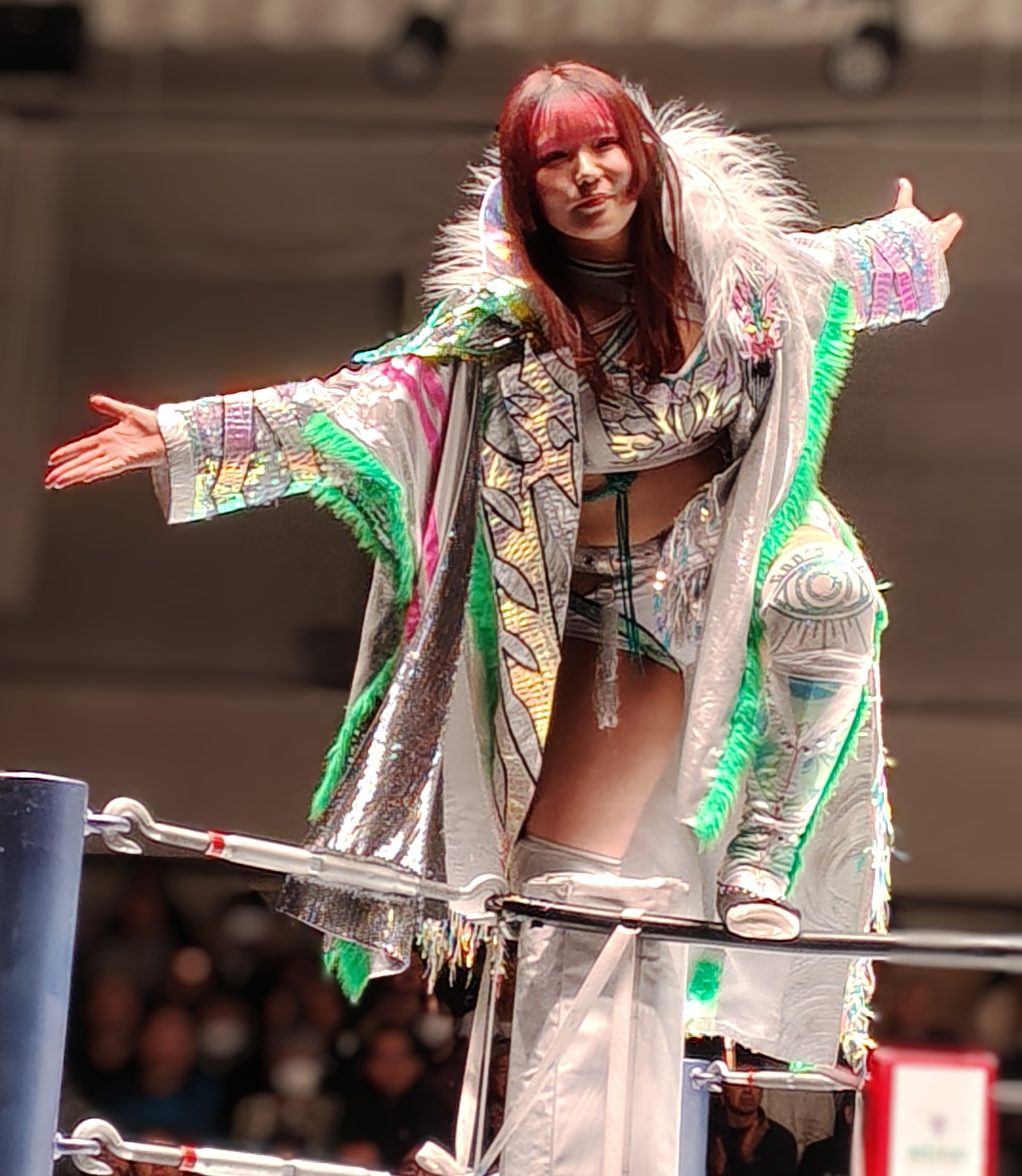
Ami Sohrei

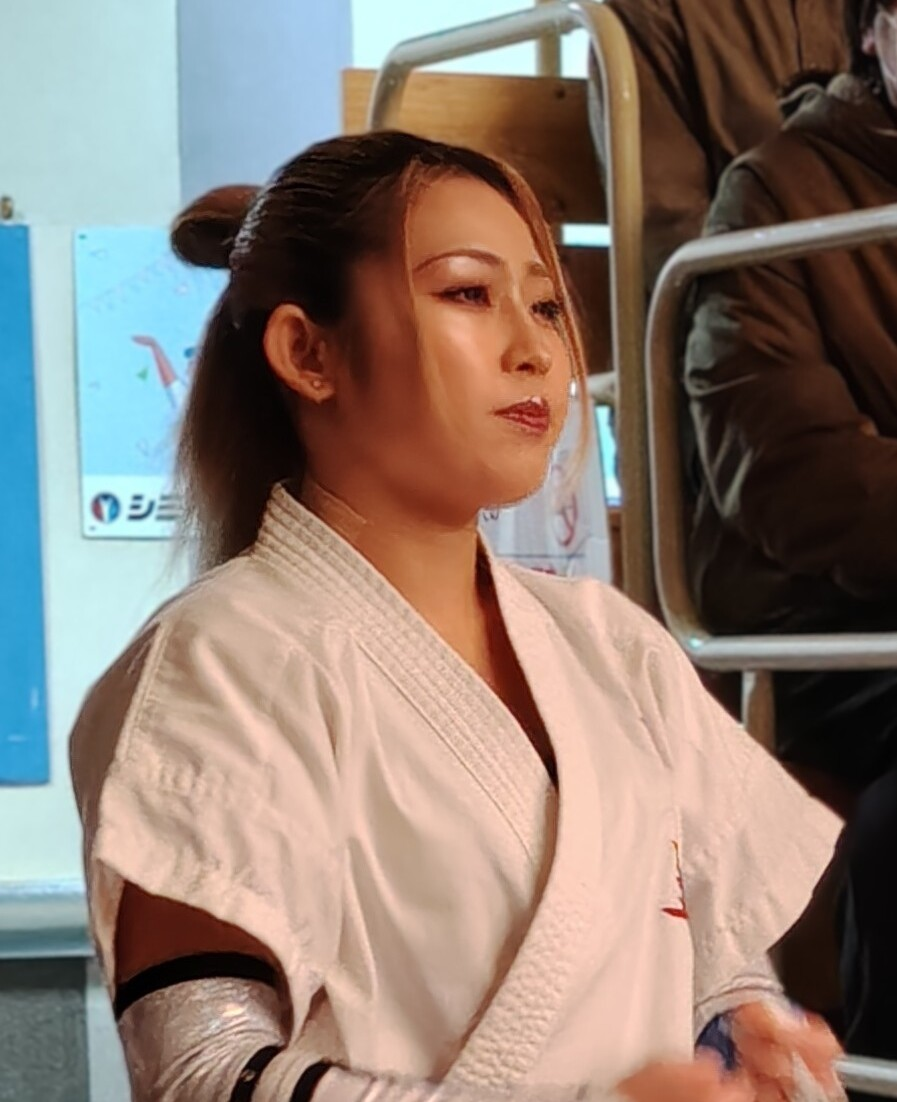
Tomoka Inaba

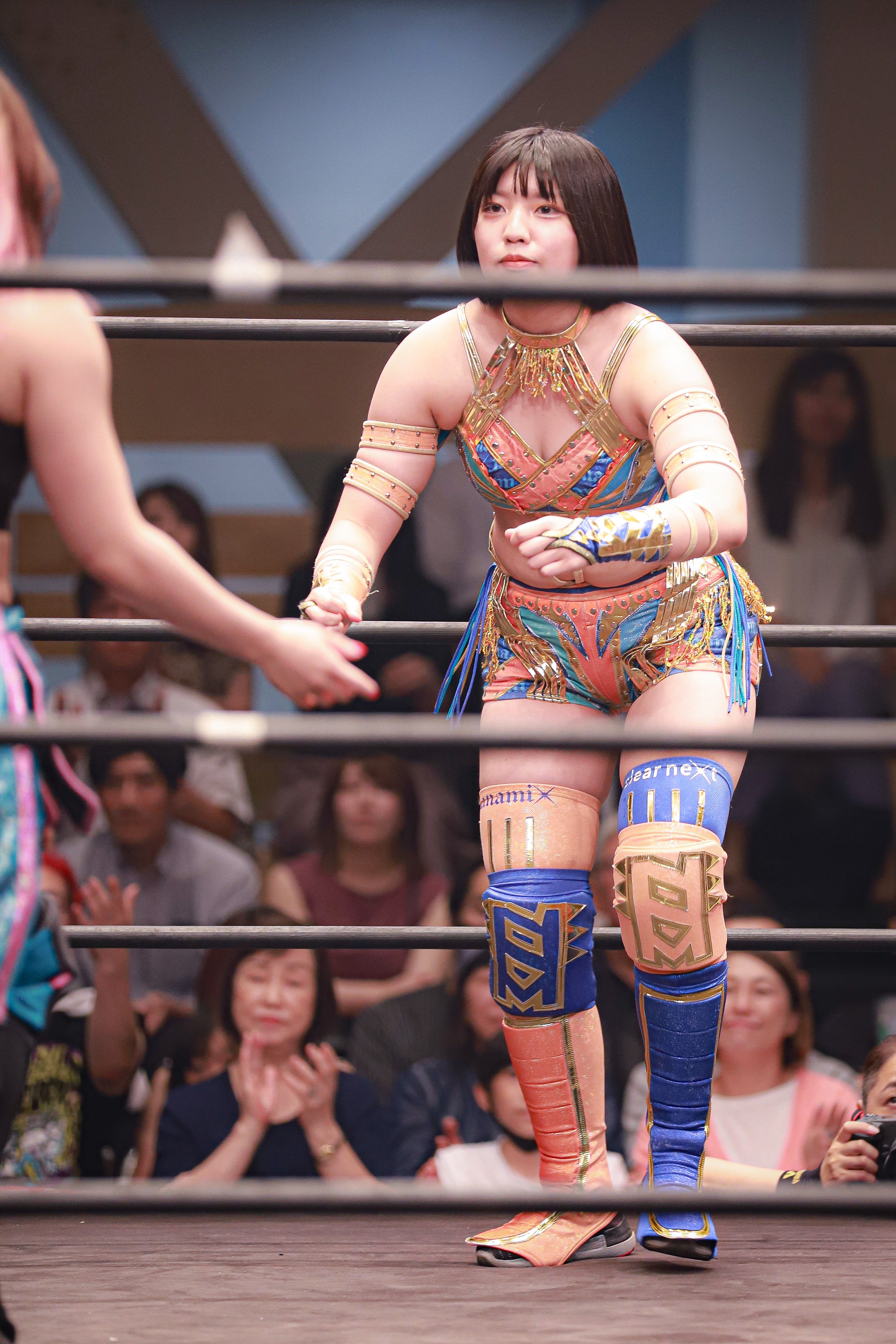
Nanami

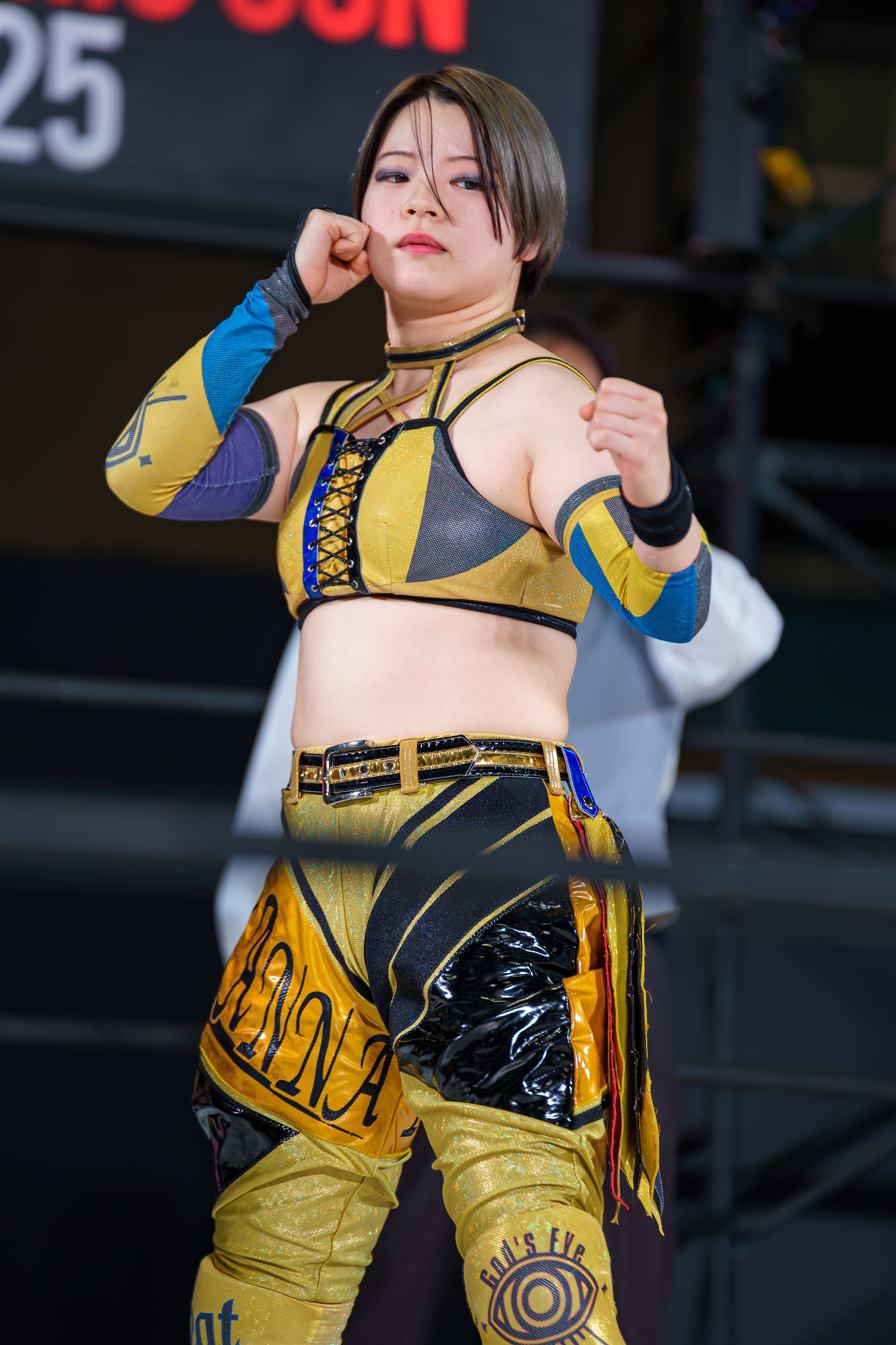
Ranna Yagami

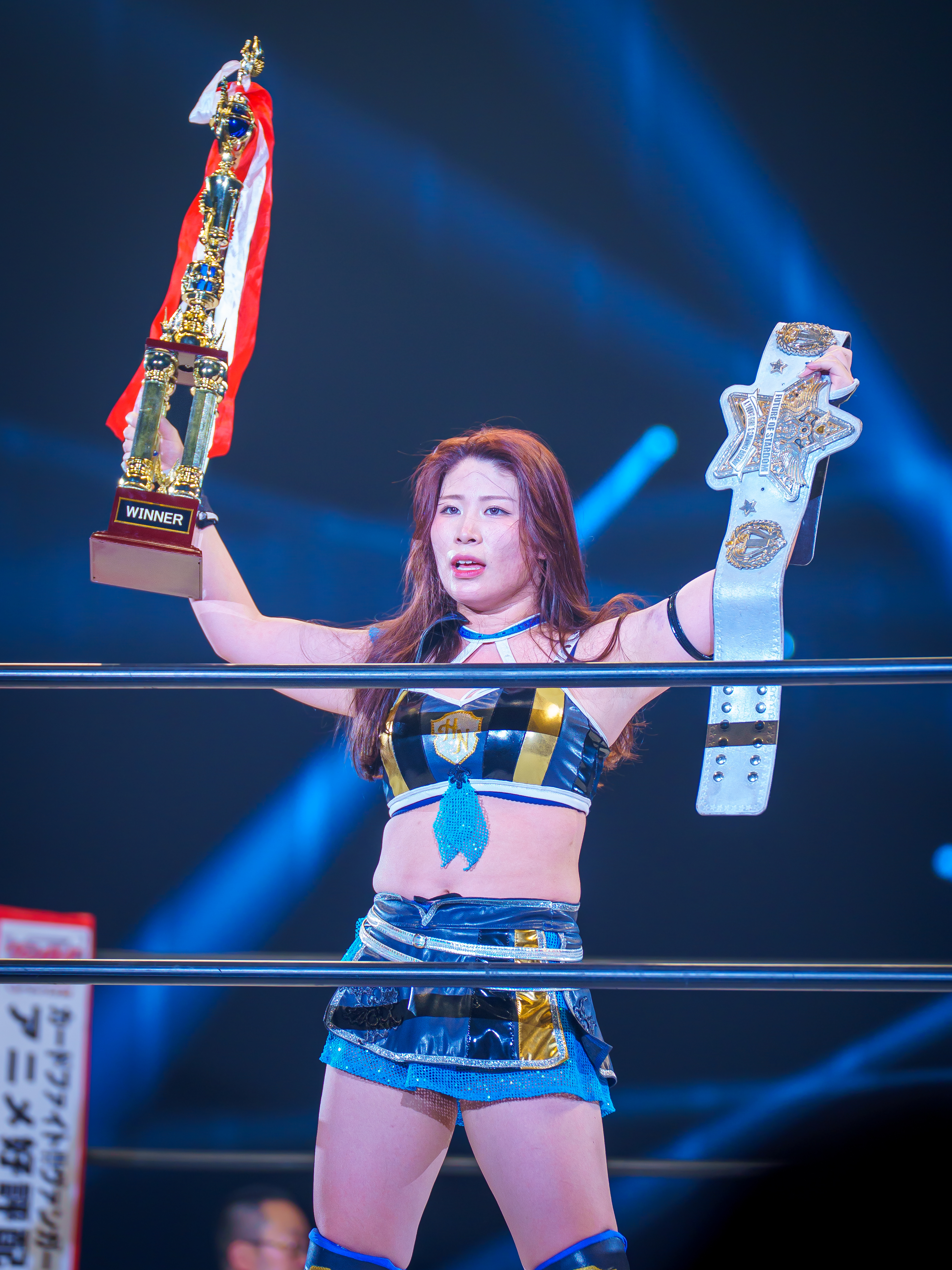
Hina

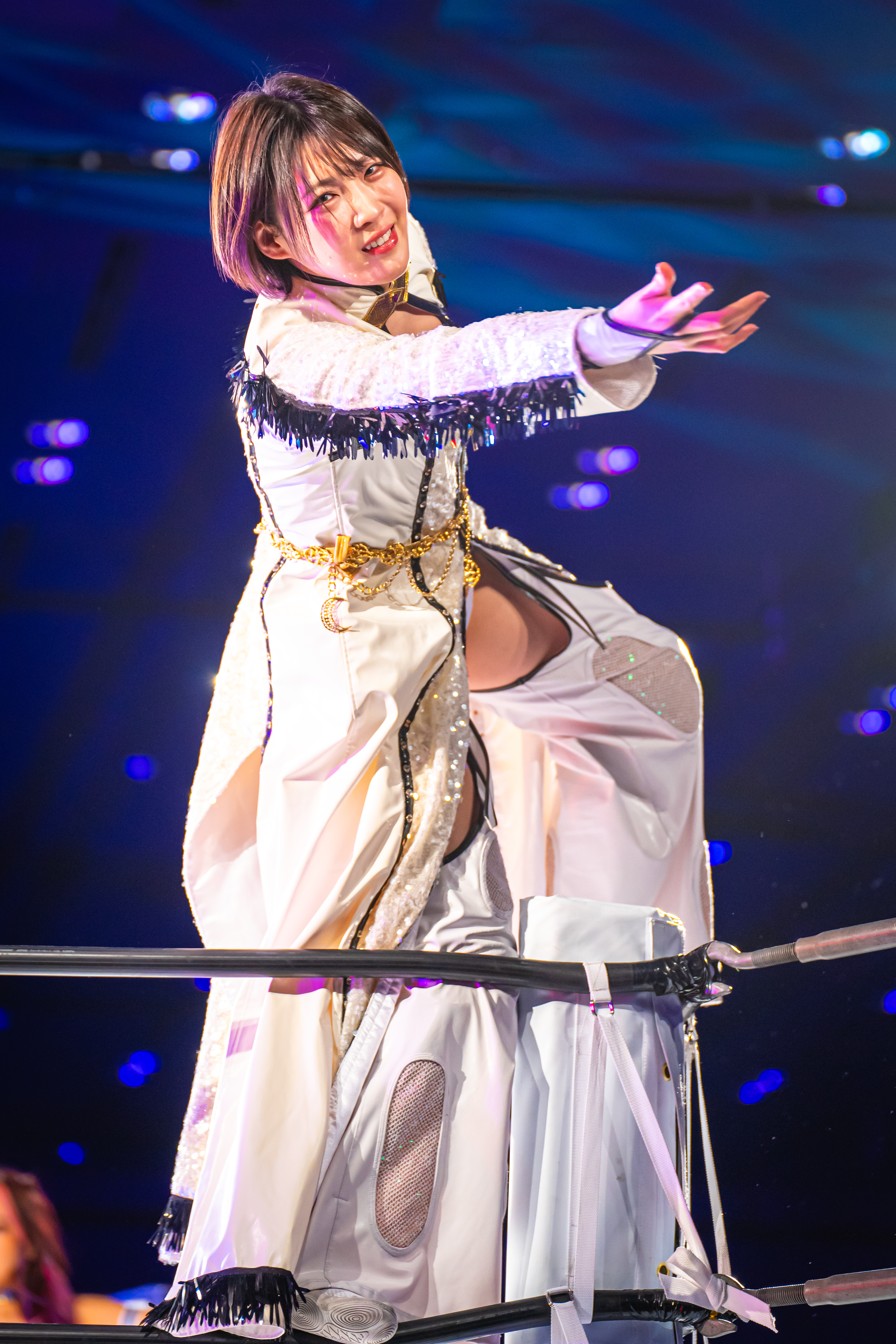
Lady C

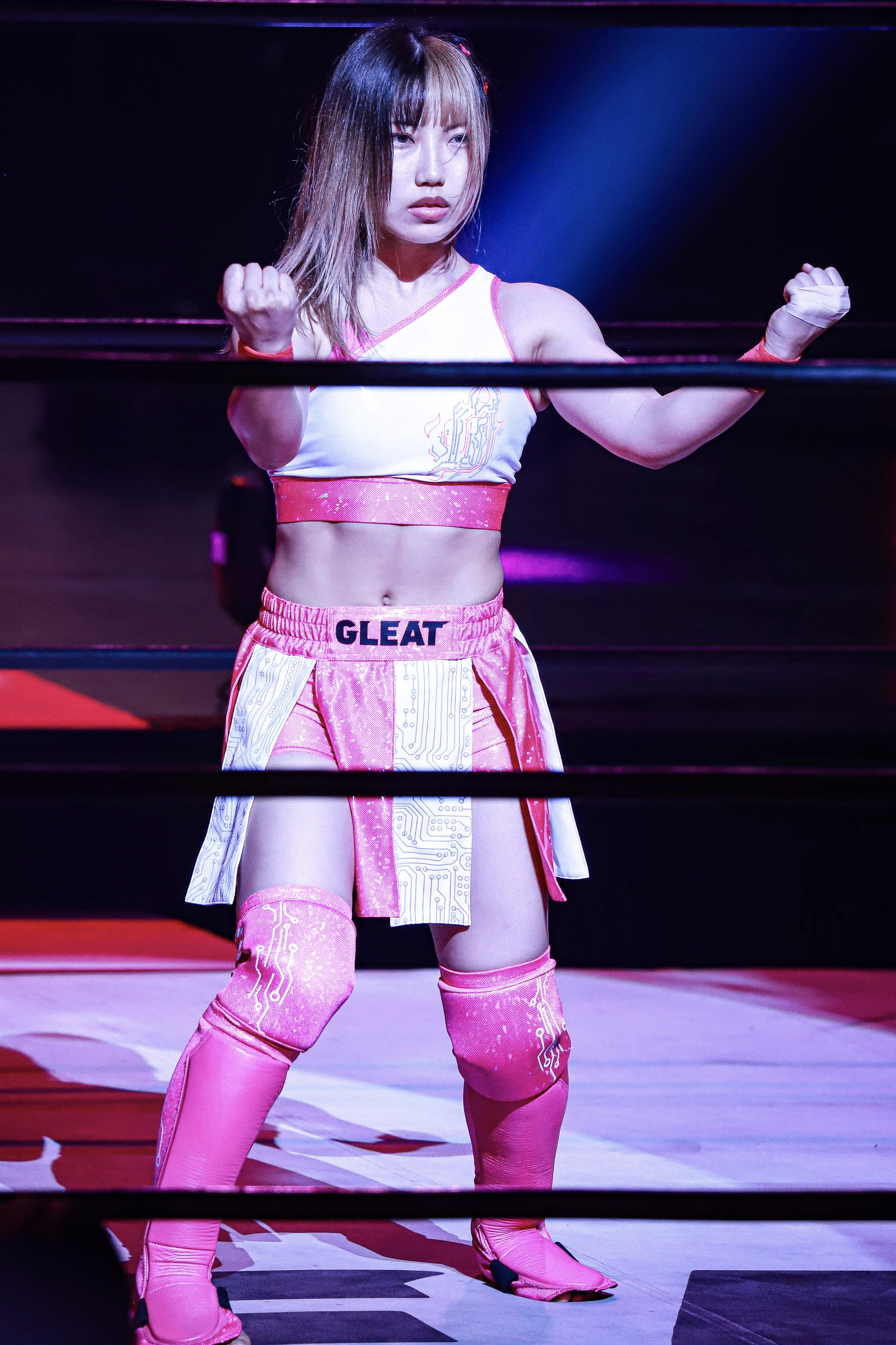
Kiyoka Kotatsu

=== Current ===
*	Founding member
I	Leader

Member		Joined
Syuri	*I	March 26, 2022
Ami Sohrei	*	March 26, 2022
Tomoka Inaba		August 26, 2022
Nanami		October 19, 2022
Ranna Yagami		January 20, 2024
Hina		August 4, 2024
Lady C		August 4, 2024
Kiyoka Kotatsu		December 29, 2024

=== Former ===
Member	Joined	Left
Mirai	April 3, 2022	March 31, 2024
Konami	May 1, 2022	July 23, 2024
Scandinavian Hurricane	December 3, 2023	December 17, 2023
Saki Kashima	July 2, 2023	April 26, 2026

== Sub-groups ==
=== Current ===
Affiliate	Members	Tenure	Type
Karate Brave	Syuri; Tomoka Inaba	2022–present	Tag team
Reiwa Tokyo Towers	Lady C Ami Sohrei	2023-Present	Tag Team
Team Classroom	Lady C Hina	2024-Present	Tag Team
The Karate Kids	Tomoka Inaba; Ranna Yagami	2024-present	Tag Team
Hinaba	Hina; Tomoka Inaba	2024-Present	Tag Team
Blue Flame	Hina; Ranna Yagami	2024-present	Tag team
Dream Trine	Hina; Ami Sohrei; Lady C	2026-present	Trio

=== Former ===
Affiliate	Members	Tenure	Type
The New Eras	Ami Sourei; Mirai	2022–2024	Tag team
Abarenbo GE	Syuri; Mirai; Ami Sourei	2023–2024	Trio
Anecon	Saki Kashima; Syuri	2023–2026	Tag team

== Championships and accomplishments ==
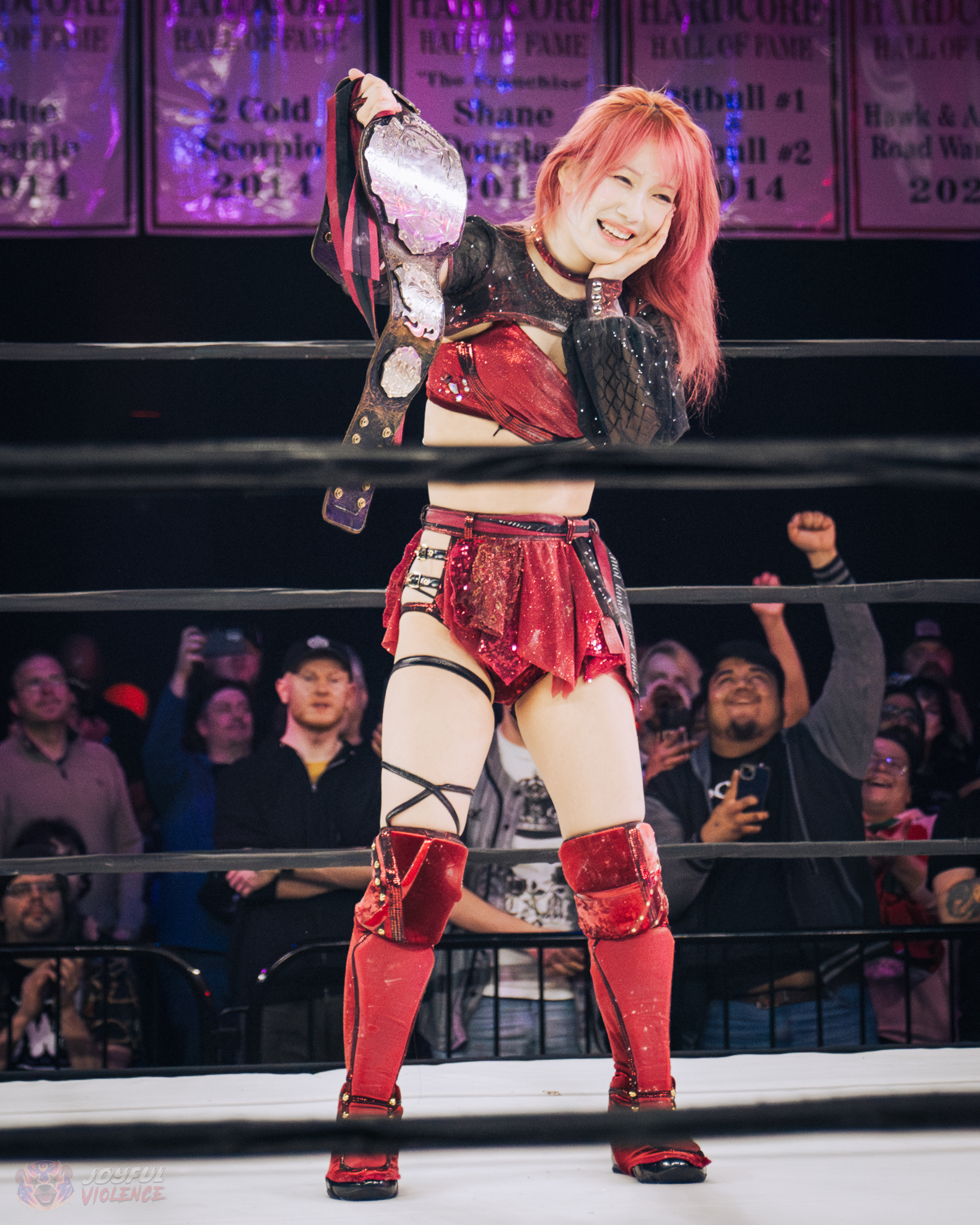
Saki Kashima as the High Speed Champion at Stardom American Dream 2024.

- Ice Ribbon
  - Triangle Ribbon Championship (2 times) – Nanami
- New Japan Pro Wrestling
  - IWGP Women's Championship (2 times, current) – Syuri
  - Strong Women's Championship (1 time) – Syuri
- Pro Wrestling Illustrated
  - Singles wrestlers
    - Ranked Syuri No. 1 of the top 150 female singles wrestlers in the PWI Women's 150 in 2022
    - Ranked Mirai No. 43 of the top 150 female singles wrestlers in the PWI Women's 150 in 2022
    - Ranked Kashima No. 73 of the top 250 female singles wrestlers in the PWI Women's 250 in 2023
    - Ranked Hina No. 93 of the top 250 female singles wrestlers in the PWI Women's 250 in 2025
    - Ranked Sourei No. 109 of the top 250 female singles wrestlers in the PWI Women's 250 in 2023
    - Ranked Inaba No. 129 of the top 250 female singles wrestlers in the PWI Women's 250 in 2025
  - Tag team wrestlers
    - Ranked Mirai and Sourei No. 15 of the top 100 tag teams in the PWI Tag Team 100 of 2023
- Professional Wrestling Just Tap Out
  - Queen of JTO Championship (3 times) – Inaba
  - JTO Girls Championship (1 times, current) - Inaba
  - JTO Girls Tag Team Championship (3 times, inaugural, current) – Inaba with Aoi (1); Rhythm (1); and Mirai (Note: Mirai wasn’t apart of the stable when she won the titles with Inaba) (1)
  - JTO Girls Tag Team Title Tournament (2024) – Inaba with Aoi
  - The Third Grand Slam Champion - Inaba
  - JTO Girls Tournament (2024) - Inaba
- World Wonder Ring Stardom
  - World of Stardom Championship (1 time) – Syuri
  - Wonder of Stardom Championship (1 time) – Mirai
  - Goddesses of Stardom Championship (2 times) – Mirai and Sourei (1) and Syuri and Konami (1)
  - Artist of Stardom Championship (2 times) – Syuri, Mirai and Sourei (1); Sourei, Hina, Lady C (1)
  - High Speed Championship (2 times) – Kashima
  - Future of Stardom Championship (3 times, current) – Sourei (1), Hina (1), Yagami (1, current)
  - Stardom Cinderella Tournament (2022, 2023) – Mirai
  - 5★Star GP Award (1 time)
    - 5★Star GP Technical Skill Award (2022) – Mirai
  - Stardom Year-End Award (3 times)
    - Best Match Award – Syuri vs. Giulia (2022)
    - MVP Award – Syuri (2022)
    - Best Technique Award – Mirai (2023)
- World Woman Pro-Wrestling Diana
  - World Woman Pro-Wrestling Diana Tag Team Championship (1 time) – Nanami with Rina Amikura
  - World Woman Pro-Wrestling Diana Crystal Championship (1 time, inaugural) – Nanami

== See also ==
- Neo Stardom Army
- Donna Del Mondo
- Queen's Quest
- Oedo Tai
- Stars
- Cosmic Angels
