= Stardom New Blood 3 =

2022 World Wonder Ring Stardom event

New Blood 3
- Promotional poster of the New Blood event series
- Promotion: World Wonder Ring Stardom
- Date: July 8, 2022
- City: Tokyo, Japan
- Venue: Shinagawa Intercity Hall
- Attendance: 419

Event chronology
| ← Previous; Fight in the Top | Next → Mid Summer Champions |

New Blood chronology
| ← Previous; New Blood 2 | Next → New Blood 4 |

Stardom New Blood 3 (スターダムニューブラッド3, Sutādamunyūburaddo 3) was a professional wrestling event promoted by World Wonder Ring Stardom. The event took place on July 8, 2022, in Tokyo, Japan at the Shinagawa Intercity Hall, with a limited attendance due in part to the ongoing COVID-19 pandemic at the time.

Seven matches were contested at the event. In the main event, Giulia defeated Miyu Amasaki.

== Background ==
The "New Blood" is a series of events which mainly focus on matches where rookie wrestlers, usually with three or less years of in-ring experience, evolve. Besides wrestlers from Stardom, various superstars from multiple promotions of the Japanese independent scene are invited to compete in bouts that are usually going under the stipulation of singles or tag team matches.

=== Storylines ===
The show featured seven professional wrestling matches that resulted from scripted storylines, where wrestlers portrayed villains, heroes, or less distinguishable characters in the scripted events that built tension and culminated in a wrestling match or series of matches. The event's press conference took place on June 14, 2022 and was broadcast live on Stardom's YouTube channel.

=== Event ===
The entire event was broadcast live on Stardom's YouTube channel. In the opening match, Donna Del Mondo's Mai Sakurai defeated Ganbare Pro-Wrestling's Yuuri. Next, God's Eye member Ami Sourei defeated World Woman Pro-Wrestling Diana's Nanami by way of submission. After Mirai and Suzu Suzuki's match ended in a draw, the latter kept on challenging Giulia as part of her still ongoing feud with her at the moment. Mai Sakurai appeared on behalf of Giulia, and then Risa Sera was summoned by Suzuki, a fact that hinted at a tag team match between the Donna Del Mondo and Prominence's unit members on further notice. After Ram Kaicho defeated Waka Tsukiyama in the fifth match, Rina of Oedo Tai came up to challenge Kaicho to a tag team match in the future. After Mirai's match against Suzu Suzuki, a backstage video was shown where World of Stardom Champion Syuri got attacked by Prominence's bodyguard Hiragi Kurumi. The show concluded with Giulia defeating rookie Miyu Amasaki in a singles match as the result of the main event.

== Results ==
| No. | Results | Stipulations | Times |
|---|---|---|---|
| 1 | Mai Sakurai defeated Yuuri (with Yuna Manase) | Singles match | 7:46 |
| 2 | Ami Sourei defeated Nanami by submission | Singles match | 8:03 |
| 3 | Stars (Hanan, Momo Kohgo and Saya Iida) defeated JTO (Tomoka Inaba, Aoi and Misa Kagura) | Six-woman tag team match | 10:36 |
| 4 | Mirai vs. Suzu Suzuki ended in a time limit draw | Singles match | 15:00 |
| 5 | Ram Kaicho (with Maika Ozaki) defeated Waka Tsukiyama | Singles match | 6:05 |
| 6 | Oedo Tai (Starlight Kid, Ruaka and Rina) and Haruka Umesaki defeated Cosmic Angels (Unagi Sayaka, Mina Shirakawa and Color's (Yuko Sakurai and Rina Amikura)) by submission | Eight-woman tag team match | 11:13 |
| 7 | Giulia defeated Miyu Amasaki | Singles match | 14:21 |
