= Stardom 5 Star Grand Prix 2022 =

2022 World Wonder Ring Stardom wrestling event

- Promotional poster

Tournament information
- Sport: Professional wrestling
- Location: Japan
- Dates: July 30, 2022–October 1, 2022
- Tournament format: Two-block round-robin
- Host: World Wonder Ring Stardom
- Participants: 26

Final positions
- Champions: Giulia
- Runner-up: Tam Nakano

Tournament statistics
- Matches played: 157

Stardom 5 Star Grand Prix 2022 (スターダム5スターグランプリ2022, Sutādamu 5 sutāguranpuri 2022), often stylized as 5★Star GP 2022 was the eleventh annual professional wrestling tournament under the Stardom 5Star Grand Prix Tournament branch promoted by the Japanese promotion World Wonder Ring Stardom. It took place between July 31 and October 1, 2022, with limited attendance due in part to the COVID-19 pandemic at the time.

== Tournament history ==
The Stardom 5 Star Grand Prix is a professional wrestling tournament held each summer by Stardom. Similar to Bushiroad-owned male counterpart New Japan Pro-Wrestling with the G1 Climax tournament, it is currently held as a round-robin tournament with wrestlers split into two pools. The winner of each pool will compete in the final to decide the winner. As is the case with G1 Climax, a win is two points and a draw is one point for each wrestler.

=== Storylines ===
The event featured professional wrestling matches that resulted from scripted storylines, where wrestlers portrayed villains, heroes, or less distinguishable characters in the scripted events that built tension and culminated in a wrestling match or series of matches. The event's official press conference took place on July 7, 2022, and was broadcast live on Stardom's YouTube channel.

The 20th day, which was also the day of the finals had Masaki Sumitani and Makoto Izubuchi joining the commentary table. Natsuko Tora returned from injury to challenge Utami Hayashishita to continue their feud which abruptly ended at Yokohama Dream Cinderella 2021 in Summer on July 4, an event where Tora sustained her injury. Giulia won the tournament by defeating Tam Nakano in the finals. The Donna Del Mondo leader challenged Syuri for the World of Stardom Championship at Stardom Dream Queendom on December 29, 2022.

== Participants ==
=== Qualifiers ===
Initially, twenty-two participants were announced for the final tournament, (except for the X) with three vacant slots. Therefore, a ten-woman qualification league divided into two blocks was announced to take place to fill the unoccupied spots. The best-ranked wrestlers from each block advanced into the final tournament. Due to Mai Sakurai and Saya Iida finishing the Block B point-tied, they both qualified for the final tournament. The qualification league took place between June 4 and 28.

Current standings
Qualifier Block A
| Ami Sourei* | 8 |
| Miyu Amasaki | 4 |
| Momo Kohgo | 4 |
| Rina | 4 |
| Waka Tsukiyama | 0 |

| Qualifier Block A | Kohgo | Amasaki | Tsukiyama | Sourei | Rina |
|---|---|---|---|---|---|
| Kohgo | —N/a | Amasaki (5:39) | Kohgo (6:52) | Sourei (6:10) | Kogho (7:05) |
| Amasaki | Amasaki (5:39) | —N/a | Amasaki (8:20) | Sourei (7:31) | Rina (7:16) |
| Tsukiyama | Kohgo (6:52) | Amasaki (8:20) | —N/a | Sourei (6:41) | Rina (5:31) |
| Sourei | Sourei (6:10) | Sourei (7:31) | Sourei (6:41) | —N/a | Sourei (6:59) |
| Rina | Kogho (7:05) | Rina (7:16) | Rina (5:31) | Sourei (6:59) | —N/a |

Current standings
Qualifier Block B
| Mai Sakurai* | 5 |
| Saya Iida* | 5 |
| Ruaka | 4 |
| Hina | 3 |
| Lady C | 3 |

| Qualifier Block B | Iida | Hina | Lady C | Ruaka | Sakurai |
|---|---|---|---|---|---|
| Iida | —N/a | Iida (6:17) | Lady C (7:42) | Draw (10:00) | Iida (6:12) |
| Hina | Iida (6:17) | —N/a | Hina (6:31) | Draw (10:00) | Sakurai (6:28) |
| Lady C | Lady C (7:42) | Hina (6:31) | —N/a | Ruaka (7:27) | Draw (10:00) |
| Ruaka | Draw (10:00) | Draw (10:00) | Ruaka (7:27) | —N/a | Sakurai (5:54) |
| Sakurai | Iida (6:12) | Sakurai (6:28) | Draw (10:00) | Sakurai (5:54) | —N/a |

=== Final tournament ===
Being the biggest tournament to date, the tournament will feature twenty-six wrestlers, equally divided into two distinct blocks of thirteen with the two winners of their respective blocks moving on to the finals. The finals of the greater tournament will take place on October 1, 2022. Thekla was originally scheduled to compete but suffered an injury and was pulled from the tournament on July 26, Thekla was replaced by Momo Kohgo.

*Noted underneath are the champions who held their titles at the time of the tournament. The titleholders or even the number of contestants can change over time.

| Wrestler | Unit | Notes |
|---|---|---|
| AZM | Queen's Quest | High Speed Champion |
| Giulia | Donna Del Mondo | Winner |
| Hanan | Stars | Future of Stardom Champion |
| Hazuki | Stars | Goddesses of Stardom Champion |
| Himeka | Donna Del Mondo | |
| Koguma | Stars | Goddesses of Stardom Champion |
| Maika | Donna Del Mondo | |
| Mayu Iwatani | Stars | SWA World Champion |
| Mina Shirakawa | Cosmic Angels | |
| Mirai | God's Eye | |
| Momo Kohgo | Stars | Replaced an injured Thekla on July 26 |
| Momo Watanabe | Oedo Tai | Artist of Stardom Champion |
| Natsupoi | Cosmic Angels | |
| Risa Sera | Prominence (Note: Prominence members were not part of the Stardom roster during the event.) | |
| Saki Kashima | Oedo Tai | Artist of Stardom Champion |
| Saya Kamitani | Queen's Quest | Wonder of Stardom Champion |
| Starlight Kid | Oedo Tai | Artist of Stardom Champion |
| Suzu Suzuki | Prominence | |
| Syuri | God's Eye | World of Stardom Champion |
| Tam Nakano | Cosmic Angels | |
| Thekla | Donna Del Mondo | Pulled out of the tournament on July 26 due to injury |
| Unagi Sayaka | Cosmic Angels | |
| Utami Hayashishita | Queen's Quest | |
| Ami Sourei | God's Eye | First place of Qualifier Block A |
| Mai Sakurai | Donna Del Mondo | Point-tied first place of Qualifier Block B |
| Saya Iida | Stars | Point-tied first place of Qualifier Block B |
| Saki | Cosmic Angels/Color's | Announced as the "X" on June 29, 2022. (Note: The bold X is the term used by Stardom as a reference for the annual Grand Prix Tournament mystery competitor.) |

== Results ==
=== Overview ===
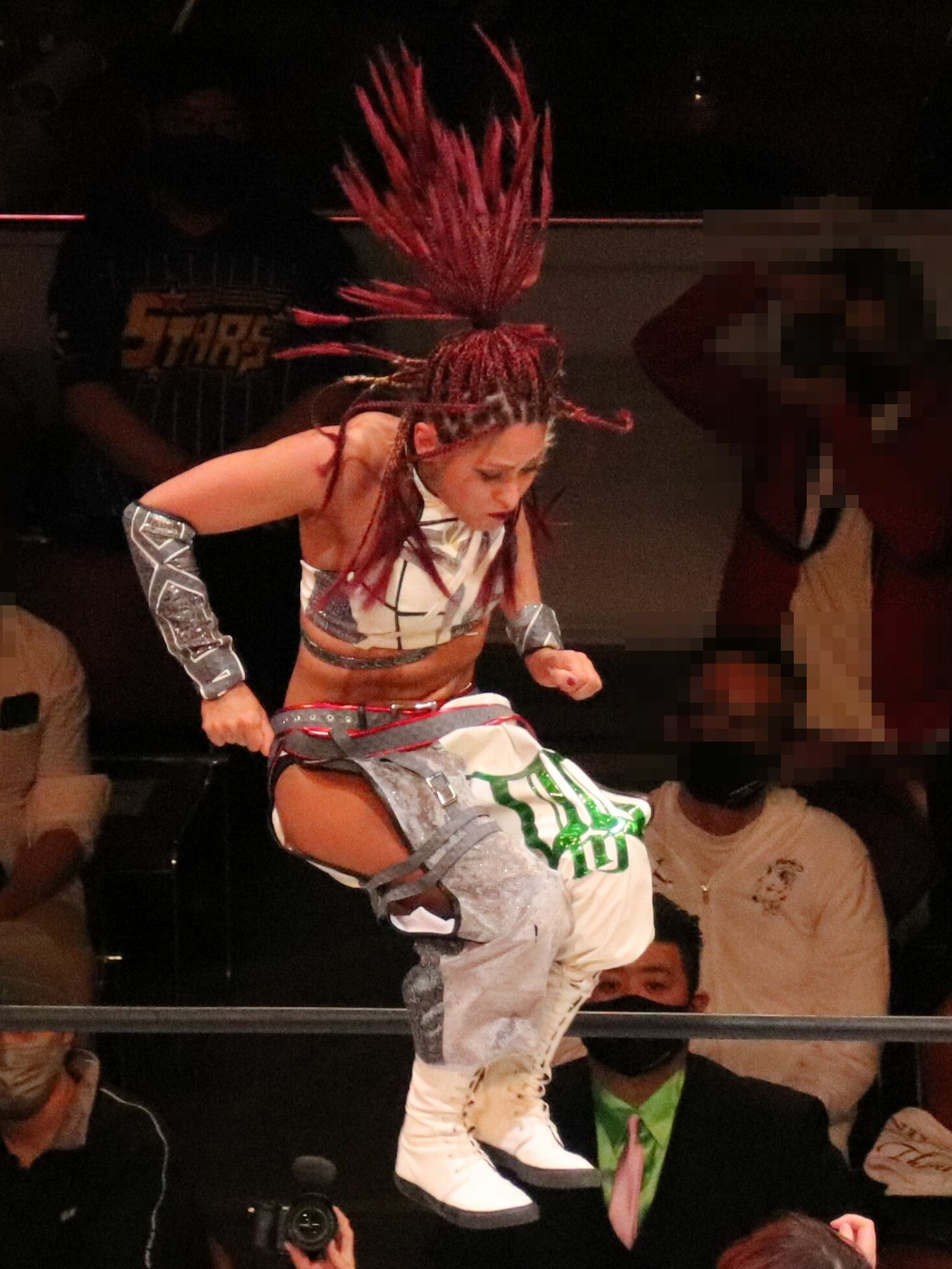
The winner of the 2022 5 Star Grand Prix, Giulia.

Stardom announced the official participants of the two blocks on June 29, 2022.

Final standings
| Red Stars | | Blue Stars | |
| Tam Nakano | 16 | Giulia | 16 |
| Himeka | 15 | Mirai | 15 |
| Maika | 15 | Mayu Iwatani | 15 |
| Risa Sera | 15 | Suzu Suzuki | 15 |
| AZM | 14 | Hazuki | 14 |
| Utami Hayashishita | 14 | Saya Kamitani | 14 |
| Koguma | 14 | Starlight Kid | 14 |
| Syuri | 14 | Natsupoi | 12 |
| Saki Kashima | 12 | Momo Watanabe | 12 |
| Saki | 10 | Ami Sourei | 11 |
| Mai Sakurai | 9 | Mina Shirakawa | 10 |
| Momo Kohgo | 4 | Saya Iida | 4 |
| Unagi Sayaka | 4 | Hanan | 4 |

| Red Stars | Syuri | Nakano | Hayashishita | AZM | Koguma | Maika | Himeka | Kohgo | Sayaka | Kashima | Sakurai | Sera | Saki |
|---|---|---|---|---|---|---|---|---|---|---|---|---|---|
| Syuri | —N/a | Syuri (14:53) | Hayashishita (14:56) | Syuri (9:31) | Koguma (8:20) | Maika (14:28) | Syuri (14:48) | Syuri (6:31) | Syuri (9:51) | Kashima (9:28) | Syuri (6:53) | Sera (12:11) | Syuri (11:52) |
| Nakano | Syuri (14:53) | —N/a | Hayashishita (9:03) | AZM (7:15) | Nakano (5:56) | Nakano (8:32) | Nakano (11:50) | Nakano (7:21) | Nakano (10:32) | Kashima (6:18) | Nakano (9:15) | Nakano (12:38) | Nakano (7:36) |
| Hayashishita | Hayashishita (14:56) | Hayashishita (9:03) | —N/a | AZM (6:55) | Koguma (6:01) | Maika (14:11) | Himeka (10:52) | Hayashishita (5:38) | Hayashishita (11:04) | Kashima (6:53) | Hayashishita (4:22) | Hayashishita (10:26) | Hayashishita (11:28) |
| AZM | Syuri (9:31) | AZM (7:15) | AZM (6:55) | —N/a | Koguma (4:51) | Maika (6:54) | AZM (8:17) | AZM (6:41) | AZM (6:53) | Kashima (0:44) | AZM (6:56) | Sera (5:45) | AZM (7:14) |
| Koguma | Koguma (8:20) | Nakano (5:56) | Koguma (6:01) | Koguma (4:51) | —N/a | Maika (8:44) | Himeka (7:54) | Koguma (6:27) | Koguma (6:15) | Koguma (7:16) | Koguma (6:37) | Sera (8:15) | Saki (5:59) |
| Maika | Maika (14:28) | Nakano (8:32) | Maika (14:11) | Maika (6:54) | Maika (8:44) | —N/a | Draw (9:57) | Kohgo (5:27) | Maika (6:50) | Kashima (10:18) | Maika (6:58) | Sera (8:19) | Maika (12:35) |
| Himeka | Syuri (14:48) | Nakano (11:50) | Himeka (10:52) | AZM (8:17) | Himeka (7:54) | Draw (9:57) | —N/a | Himeka (5:40) | Himeka (9:03) | Himeka (4:25) | Sakurai (8:13) | Himeka (7:06) | Himeka (6:13) |
| Kohgo | Syuri (6:31) | Nakano (7:21) | Hayashishita (5:38) | AZM (6:41) | Koguma (6:27) | Kohgo (5:27) | Himeka (5:40) | —N/a | Sayaka (5:24) | Kohgo (5:36) | Sakurai (8:14) | Sera (7:25) | Saki (6:23) |
| Sayaka | Syuri (9:51) | Nakano (10:32) | Hayashishita (11:04) | AZM (6:53) | Koguma (6:15) | Maika (6:50) | Himeka (9:03) | Sayaka (5:24) | —N/a | Sayaka (6:02) | Sakurai (5:29) | Sera (6:01) | Saki (9:07) |
| Kashima | Kashima (9:28) | Kashima (6:18) | Kashima (6:53) | Kashima (0:44) | Koguma (7:16) | Kashima (10:18) | Himeka (4:25) | Kohgo (5:36) | Sayaka (6:02) | —N/a | Sakurai (3:50) | Kashima (6:49) | Saki (6:35) |
| Sakurai | Syuri (6:53) | Nakano (9:15) | Hayashishita (4:22) | AZM (6:56) | Koguma (6:37) | Maika (6:50) | Sakurai (8:13) | Sakurai (8:14) | Sakurai (5:29) | Sakurai (3:50) | —N/a | Draw (7:01) | Saki (6:04) |
| Sera | Sera (12:11) | Nakano (12:38) | Hayashishita (10:26) | Sera (5:45) | Sera (8:15) | Sera (8:19) | Himeka (7:06) | Sera (7:25) | Sera (6:01) | Kashima (6:49) | Draw (7:01) | —N/a | Sera (8:13) |
| Saki | Syuri (11:52) | Nakano (7:36) | Hayashishita (11:28) | AZM (7:14) | Saki (5:59) | Maika (12:35) | Himeka (6:13) | Saki (6:23) | Saki (9:07) | Saki (6:35) | Saki (6:04) | Sera (8:13) | —N/a |
| Blue Stars | Iwatani | Giulia | Kamitani | Kid | Watanabe | Hazuki | Iida | Natsupoi | Shirakawa | Hanan | Mirai | Sourei | Suzuki |
| Iwatani | —N/a | Draw (15:00) | Kamitani (9:26) | Iwatani (13:09) | Watanabe (11:32) | Iwatani (10:20) | Iwatani (5:04) | Natsupoi (7:21) | Iwatani (4:56) | Iwatani (9:33) | Mirai (12:51) | Iwatani (8:10) | Iwatani (10:52) |
| Giulia | Draw (15:00) | —N/a | Giulia (14:49) | Giulia (11:32) | Watanabe (11:21) | Hazuki (11:54) | Giulia (7:58) | Giulia (10:56) | Giulia (8:46) | Giulia (8:58) | Mirai (12:10) | Giulia (12:20) | Draw (15:00) |
| Kamitani | Kamitani (9:26) | Giulia (14:49) | —N/a | Kid (9:45) | Kamitani (12:00) | Kamitani (12:47) | Kamitani (8:10) | Kamitani (9:02) | Shirakawa (13:08) | Kamitani (8:37) | Draw (15:00) | Draw (8:21) | Suzuki (11:40) |
| Kid | Iwatani (13:09) | Giulia (11:32) | Kid (9:45) | —N/a | Watanabe (10:53) | Hazuki (11:15) | Kid (7:19) | Kid (13:26) | Kid (9:27) | Kid (7:19) | Kid (10:24) | Kid (7:02) | Suzuki (14:11) |
| Watanabe | Watanabe (11:32) | Watanabe (11:21) | Kamitani (12:00) | Watanabe (10:53) | —N/a | Watanabe (10:34) | Iida (7:36) | Watanabe (10:05) | Shirakawa (10:42) | Watanabe (7:41) | Mirai (11:25) | Sourei (9:07) | Suzuki (13:27) |
| Hazuki | Iwatani (10:20) | Hazuki (11:54) | Kamitani (12:47) | Hazuki (11:15) | Watanabe (10:34) | —N/a | Iida (7:48) | Hazuki (10:55) | Hazuki (10:39) | Hazuki (6:46) | Hazuki (10:29) | Sourei (10:36) | Hazuki (9:52) |
| Iida | Iwatani (5:04) | Giulia (7:58) | Kamitani (8:10) | Kid (7:19) | Iida (7:36) | Iida (7:48) | —N/a | Natsupoi (8:49) | Shirakawa (4:50) | Hanan (6:29) | Mirai (6:57) | Sourei (5:56) | Suzuki (6:56) |
| Natsupoi | Natsupoi (7:21) | Giulia (10:56) | Kamitani (9:02) | Kid (13:26) | Watanabe (10:05) | Hazuki (10:55) | Natsupoi (8:49) | —N/a | Shirakawa (7:50) | Natsupoi (6:08) | Natsupoi (10:41) | Natsupoi (10:39) | Natsupoi (10:11) |
| Shirakawa | Iwatani (4:56) | Giulia (8:46) | Shirakawa (13:08) | Kid (9:27) | Shirakawa (10:42) | Hazuki (10:39) | Shirakawa (4:50) | Shirakawa (7:50) | —N/a | Hanan (6:40) | Mirai (10:35) | Shirakawa (10:42) | Suzuki (9:25) |
| Hanan | Iwatani (9:33) | Giulia (8:58) | Kamitani (8:37) | Kid (7:19) | Watanabe (7:41) | Hazuki (6:46) | Hanan (6:29) | Natsupoi (6:08) | Hanan (6:40) | —N/a | Mirai (7:51) | Sourei (6:17) | Suzuki (7:29) |
| Mirai | Mirai (12:51) | Mirai (12:10) | Draw (15:00) | Kid (10:24) | Mirai (11:25) | Hazuki (10:29) | Mirai (6:57) | Natsupoi (10:41) | Mirai (10:35) | Mirai (7:51) | —N/a | Sourei (10:28) | Mirai (13:49) |
| Sourei | Iwatani (8:10) | Giulia (12:20) | Draw (8:21) | Kid (7:02) | Sourei (9:07) | Sourei (10:36) | Sourei (5:56) | Natsupoi (10:39) | Shirakawa (10:42) | Sourei (6:17) | Sourei (10:28) | —N/a | Suzuki (10:31) |
| Suzuki | Iwatani (10:52) | Draw (15:00) | Suzuki (11:40) | Suzuki (14:11) | Suzuki (13:27) | Hazuki (9:52) | Suzuki (6:56) | Natsupoi (10:11) | Suzuki (9:25) | Suzuki (7:29) | Mirai (13:49) | Suzuki (10:31) | —N/a |

| Final; October 1 |
| Red | Tam Nakano | Pin |
| Blue | Giulia | 25:37 |

=== Night 1 ===
Night 1 (July 30)
| No. | Results | Stipulations | Times |
|---|---|---|---|
| 1^{P} | Cosmic Angels (Tam Nakano and Natsupoi) defeated Oedo Tai (Starlight Kid and Fukigen Death, Momo Watanabe and Saki Kashima, Ruaka and Rina), Stars (Koguma and Hanan), and Queen's Quest (Miyu Amasaki and Hina) | Gauntlet tag team match | 13:07 |
| 2 | Mai Sakurai defeated Momo Kohgo | 5 Star Grand Prix tournament match | 5:56 |
| 3 | Ami Sourei defeated Saya Iida | 5 Star Grand Prix tournament match | 8:14 |
| 4 | Saki defeated Unagi Sayaka | 5 Star Grand Prix tournament match | 9:07 |
| 5 | Risa Sera defeated Maika | 5 Star Grand Prix tournament match | 8:19 |
| 6 | Syuri defeated AZM | 5 Star Grand Prix tournament match | 9:31 |
| 7 | Kairi and Nanae Takahashi defeated Saya Kamitani and Lady C | Tag team match | 15:32 |
| 8 | Mirai defeated Mayu Iwatani | 5 Star Grand Prix tournament match | 12:51 |
| 9 | Himeka defeated Utami Hayashishita | 5 Star Grand Prix tournament match | 10:52 |
| 10 | Hazuki defeated Giulia | 5 Star Grand Prix tournament match | 11:54 |
P / – the match was broadcast on the pre-show

=== Night 2 ===
Night 2 (July 31)
| No. | Results | Stipulations | Times |
|---|---|---|---|
| 1^{P} | Donna Del Mondo (Maika and Mai Sakurai) defeated Oedo Tai (Ruaka and Rina), Queen's Quest (AZM and Miyu Amasaki, Hina and Lady C), and Stars (Hanan and Hazuki) | Gauntlet tag team match | 13:07 |
| 2 | Koguma defeated Momo Kohgo | 5 Star Grand Prix tournament match | 6:27 |
| 3 | Mina Shirakawa defeated Momo Watanabe | 5 Star Grand Prix tournament match | 10:42 |
| 4 | Risa Sera defeated Saki | 5 Star Grand Prix tournament match | 8:13 |
| 5 | Kairi and Natsupoi defeated Stars (Mayu Iwatani and Saya Iida) | Tag team match | 13:49 |
| 6 | Tam Nakano defeated Himeka | 5 Star Grand Prix tournament match | 11:50 |
| 7 | Mirai defeated Giulia | 5 Star Grand Prix tournament match | 12:10 |
| 8 | Starlight Kid defeated Saya Kamitani | 5 Star Grand Prix tournament match | 9:45 |
| 9 | Utami Hayashishita defeated Syuri | 5 Star Grand Prix tournament match | 14:56 |
P / – the match was broadcast on the pre-show

=== Night 3 ===
Night 3 (August 6)
| No. | Results | Stipulations | Times |
|---|---|---|---|
| 1 | Koguma defeated Saki Kashima | 5 Star Grand Prix tournament match | 7:16 |
| 2 | Mayu Iwatani defeated Hanan | 5 Star Grand Prix tournament match | 9:33 |
| 3 | Cosmic Angels (Mina Shirakawa and Unagi Sayaka) defeated Stars (Saya Iida and Momo Kohgo), Oedo Tai (Ruaka and Rina), Queen's Quest (Hina and Miyu Amasaki), and Donna Del Mondo (Maika and Mai Sakurai) | Gauntlet tag team match | 14:59 |
| 4 | God's Eye (Syuri and Ami Sourei) vs. Queen's Quest (Utami Hayashishita and AZM) ended in a draw | Tag team match | 15:00 |
| 5 | Natsupoi defeated Mirai | 5 Star Grand Prix tournament match | 10:41 |
| 6 | Hazuki defeated Starlight Kid | 5 Star Grand Prix tournament match | 11:15 |
| 7 | Saya Kamitani defeated Momo Watanabe | 5 Star Grand Prix tournament match | 12:00 |

=== Night 4 ===
Night 4 (August 7)
| No. | Results | Stipulations | Times |
|---|---|---|---|
| 1 | Mina Shirakawa defeated Saya Iida | 5 Star Grand Prix tournament match | 4:50 |
| 2 | Saya Kamitani defeated Hanan | 5 Star Grand Prix tournament match | 8:37 |
| 3 | AZM defeated Mai Sakurai | 5 Star Grand Prix tournament match | 6:56 |
| 4 | Utami Hayashishita defeated Unagi Sayaka | 5 Star Grand Prix tournament match | 11:04 |
| 5 | God's Eye (Syuri and Mirai) defeated Queen's Quest (Hina and Miyu Amasaki) | Tag team match | 10:29 |
| 6 | Himeka defeated Koguma | 5 Star Grand Prix tournament match | 7:54 |
| 7 | Natsupoi defeated Ami Sourei | 5 Star Grand Prix tournament match | 10:39 |
| 8 | Stars (Mayu Iwatani, Hazuki and Momo Kohgo) defeated Oedo Tai (Saki Kashima, Rina and Momo Watanabe) | Six-woman tag team match | 17:32 |

=== Night 5 ===
Night 5 (August 11)
| No. | Results | Stipulations | Times |
|---|---|---|---|
| 1 | Ami Sourei defeated Hanan | 5 Star Grand Prix tournament match | 6:17 |
| 2 | Himeka defeated Momo Kohgo | 5 Star Grand Prix tournament match | 5:40 |
| 3 | Mai Sakurai defeated Saki Kashima | 5 Star Grand Prix tournament match | 3:50 |
| 4 | Saki defeated Koguma | 5 Star Grand Prix tournament match | 5:59 |
| 5 | Mayu Iwatani defeated Saya Iida | 5 Star Grand Prix tournament match | 5:04 |
| 6 | Syuri defeated Unagi Sayaka | 5 Star Grand Prix tournament match | 9:51 |
| 7 | AZM defeated Tam Nakano | 5 Star Grand Prix tournament match | 7:15 |
| 8 | Momo Watanabe defeated Starlight Kid | 5 Star Grand Prix tournament match | 10:53 |
| 9 | Hazuki defeated Natsupoi | 5 Star Grand Prix tournament match | 10:55 |
| 10 | Utami Hayashishita defeated Risa Sera | 5 Star Grand Prix tournament match | 10:26 |
| 11 | Mirai defeated Suzu Suzuki | 5 Star Grand Prix tournament match | 13:49 |

=== Night 6 ===
Night 6 (August 13)
| No. | Results | Stipulations | Times |
|---|---|---|---|
| 1 | Donna Del Mondo (Giulia and Himeka) defeated Queen's Quest (Utami Hayashishita and Lady C), God’s Eye (Mirai and Ami Sourei), and Koguma and Unagi Sayaka | 4-way tag battle | 9:00 |
| 2 | AZM defeated Momo Kohgo | 5 Star Grand Prix tournament match | 6:41 |
| 3 | Momo Watanabe defeated Hanan | 5 Star Grand Prix tournament match | 7:45 |
| 4 | Syuri defeated Mai Sakurai | 5 Star Grand Prix tournament match | 6:53 |
| 5 | Hazuki defeated Mina Shirakawa | 5 Star Grand Prix tournament match | 10:39 |
| 6 | Saya Kamitani defeated Natsupoi | 5 Star Grand Prix tournament match | 9:02 |
| 7 | Saki Kashima defeated Maika | 5 Star Grand Prix tournament match | 10:18 |

=== Night 7 ===
Night 7 (August 14)
| No. | Results | Stipulations | Times |
|---|---|---|---|
| 1 | God's Eye (Syuri and Ami Sourei) defeated Queen's Quest (Saya Kamitani and Lady C) and Mina Shirakawa and Mai Sakurai | 3-way tag battle | 9:17 |
| 2 | Unagi Sayaka defeated Saki Kashima | 5 Star Grand Prix tournament match | 6:02 |
| 3 | Giulia defeated Hanan | 5 Star Grand Prix tournament match | 8:58 |
| 4 | Utami Hayashishita defeated Momo Kohgo | 5 Star Grand Prix tournament match | 5:34 |
| 5 | Maika defeated Koguma | 5 Star Grand Prix tournament match | 8:44 |
| 6 | AZM defeated Himeka | 5 Star Grand Prix tournament match | 9:02 |
| 7 | Hazuki defeated Mirai | 5 Star Grand Prix tournament match | 10:18 |
| 8 | Momo Watanabe defeated Natsupoi | 5 Star Grand Prix tournament match | 10:18 |

=== Night 8 ===
Night 8 (August 20)
| No. | Results | Stipulations | Times |
|---|---|---|---|
| 1 | Starlight Kid defeated Hanan | 5 Star Grand Prix tournament match | 7:19 |
| 2 | Koguma defeated Mai Sakurai | 5 Star Grand Prix tournament match | 6:37 |
| 3 | Risa Sera defeated Momo Kohgo | 5 Star Grand Prix tournament match | 7:25 |
| 4 | Ami Sourei defeated Momo Watanabe | 5 Star Grand Prix tournament match | 9:07 |
| 5 | Giulia defeated Saya Iida | 5 Star Grand Prix tournament match | 7:58 |
| 6 | Cosmic Angels (Tam Nakano, Mina Shirakawa, Unagi Sayaka and Natsupoi) defeated Queen's Quest (Utami Hayashishita, Saya Kamitani, AZM and Lady C) | 8-woman tag match | 9:03 |
| 7 | Hazuki defeated Suzu Suzuki | 5 Star Grand Prix tournament match | 9:52 |
| 8 | Saki Kashima defeated Syuri | 5 Star Grand Prix tournament match | 9:28 |
| 9 | Maika defeated Saki | 5 Star Grand Prix tournament match | 12:35 |

=== Night 9 ===
Night 9 (August 27)
| No. | Results | Stipulations | Times |
|---|---|---|---|
| 1 | Mai Sakurai defeated Unagi Sayaka | 5 Star Grand Prix tournament match | 5:29 |
| 2 | Hazuki defeated Hanan | 5 Star Grand Prix tournament match | 6:46 |
| 3 | Tam Nakano defeated Koguma | 5 Star Grand Prix tournament match | 5:56 |
| 4 | AZM defeated Saki | 5 Star Grand Prix tournament match | 7:14 |
| 5 | Mayu Iwatani defeated Mina Shirakawa | 5 Star Grand Prix tournament match | 4:56 |
| 6 | Natsupoi defeated Suzu Suzuki | 5 Star Grand Prix tournament match | 10:11 |
| 7 | Ami Sourei defeated Mirai | 5 Star Grand Prix tournament match | 10:28 |
| 8 | Himeka defeated Risa Sera | 5 Star Grand Prix tournament match | 7:06 |
| 9 | Maika defeated Utami Hayashishita | 5 Star Grand Prix tournament match | 14:11 |
| 10 | Giulia defeated Starlight Kid | 5 Star Grand Prix tournament match | 11:32 |

=== Night 10 ===
Night 10 (August 28)
| No. | Results | Stipulations | Times |
|---|---|---|---|
| 1 | Oedo Tai (Fukigen Death, Rina and Ruaka) defeated Queen's Quest (Hina and Lady C) | Three-on-two handicap match | 9:20 |
| 2 | Mirai defeated Hanan | 5 Star Grand Prix tournament match | 7:51 |
| 3 | Saya Iida defeated Momo Watanabe | 5 Star Grand Prix tournament match | 7:36 |
| 4 | Tam Nakano defeated Mai Sakurai | 5 Star Grand Prix tournament match | 9:15 |
| 5 | Himeka defeated Saki Kashima | 5 Star Grand Prix tournament match | 4:25 |
| 6 | Maika defeated AZM | 5 Star Grand Prix tournament match | 6:54 |
| 7 | Koguma defeated Syuri | 5 Star Grand Prix tournament match | 8:20 |
| 8 | Saya Kamitani defeated Hazuki | 5 Star Grand Prix tournament match | 12:47 |
| 9 | Giulia defeated Natsupoi | 5 Star Grand Prix tournament match | 10:56 |
| 10 | Mayu Iwatani defeated Ami Sourei | 5 Star Grand Prix tournament match | 8:10 |

=== Night 11 ===
Night 11 (September 3)
| No. | Results | Stipulations | Times |
|---|---|---|---|
| 1 | Momo Kohgo defeated Mirai, Natsupoi, and Waka Tsukiyama | 4-way battle | 8:37 |
| 2 | Stars (Hazuki and Saya Iida) defeated Oedo Tai (Momo Watanabe and Ruaka) | Tag team match | 7:57 |
| 3 | Mai Sakurai defeated Himeka | 5 Star Grand Prix tournament match | 8:13 |
| 4 | Starlight Kid defeated Ami Sourei | 5 Star Grand Prix tournament match | 7:02 |
| 5 | Saki Kashima defeated Tam Nakano | 5 Star Grand Prix tournament match | 6:18 |
| 6 | Giulia defeated Mina Shirakawa | 5 Star Grand Prix tournament match | 8:46 |
| 7 | Maika defeated Syuri | 5 Star Grand Prix tournament match | 14:28 |
| 8 | Saya Kamitani defeated Mayu Iwatani | 5 Star Grand Prix tournament match | 9:26 |

=== Night 12 ===
Night 12 (September 4)
| No. | Results | Stipulations | Times |
|---|---|---|---|
| 1 | Momo Kohgo defeated Saki Kashima | 5 Star Grand Prix tournament match | 5:36 |
| 2 | Saya Kamitani defeated Saya Iida | 5 Star Grand Prix tournament match | 8:10 |
| 3 | Donna Del Mondo (Giulia and Mai Sakurai) defeated Cosmic Angels (Mina Shirakawa and Waka Tsukiyama) and Oedo Tai (Starlight Kid and Ruaka) | 3-way battle | 7:59 |
| 4 | Ami Sourei defeated Hazuki | 5 Star Grand Prix tournament match | 10:36 |
| 5 | Mirai defeated Momo Watanabe | 5 Star Grand Prix tournament match | 11:25 |
| 6 | Tam Nakano defeated Maika | 5 Star Grand Prix tournament match | 8:33 |
| 7 | Natsupoi defeated Mayu Iwatani | 5 Star Grand Prix tournament match | 7:21 |
| 8 | Syuri defeated Himeka | 5 Star Grand Prix tournament match | 14:48 |

=== Night 13 ===
Night 13 (September 11)
| No. | Results | Stipulations | Times |
|---|---|---|---|
| 1 | Saya Iida defeated Momo Kohgo defeated Lady C, Maika, Mai Sakurai, and Ruaka | 6-woman Battle Royal | 7:16 |
| 2 | God's Eye (Syuri and Tomoka Inaba) defeated Cosmic Angels (Mina Shirakawa and Waka Tsukiyama) | Tag team match | 8:30 |
| 3 | Risa Sera defeated Unagi Sayaka | 5 Star Grand Prix tournament match | 6:01 |
| 4 | Himeka defeated Saki | 5 Star Grand Prix tournament match | 6:13 |
| 5 | Suzu Suzuki defeated Saya Kamitani | 5 Star Grand Prix tournament match | 11:40 |
| 6 | AZM defeated Utami Hayashishita | 5 Star Grand Prix tournament match | 6:55 |
| 7 | Mayu Iwatani vs. Giulia ended in a Time limit draw | 5 Star Grand Prix tournament match | 15:00 |
| 8 | Oedo Tai (Saki Kashima, Momo Watanabe and Starlight Kid) (c) defeated Stars (Hanan and FWC (Hazuki and Koguma)) | Six-woman tag team match for the Artist of Stardom Championship | 16:42 |
| 9 | Cosmic Angels (Tam Nakano and Natsupoi) (c) defeated God's Eye (Mirai and Ami Sourei) | Tag team match for the Goddesses of Stardom Championship | 20:54 |
(c) / – the champion(s) heading into the match

=== Night 14 ===
Night 14 (September 12)
| No. | Results | Stipulations | Times |
|---|---|---|---|
| 1 | Oedo Tai (Rina and Fukigen Death) defeated Queen's Quest (Hinan and Lady C) | Tag team match | 6:09 |
| 2 | Natsupoi defeated Hanan | 5 Star Grand Prix tournament match | 6:08 |
| 3 | Mina Shirakawa defeated Ami Sourei | 5 Star Grand Prix tournament match | 10:42 |
| 4 | Saki defeated Saki Kashima | 5 Star Grand Prix tournament match | 6:35 |
| 5 | Saya Iida defeated Hazuki | 5 Star Grand Prix tournament match | 7:48 |
| 6 | Utami Hayashishita defeated Mai Sakurai | 5 Star Grand Prix tournament match | 4:22 |
| 7 | Syuri defeated Momo Kohgo | 5 Star Grand Prix tournament match | 6:31 |
| 8 | Risa Sera defeated AZM | 5 Star Grand Prix tournament match | 5:45 |
| 9 | Tam Nakano defeated Unagi Sayaka | 5 Star Grand Prix tournament match | 10:32 |
| 10 | Mayu Iwatani defeated Suzu Suzuki | 5 Star Grand Prix tournament match | 10:52 |

=== Night 15 ===
Night 15 (September 17)
| No. | Results | Stipulations | Times |
|---|---|---|---|
| 1 | Stars (Momo Kohgo and Koguma) defeated Cosmic Angels (Waka Tsukiyama and Tam Nakano) and Ami Sourei and Lady C | 3-way Tag Battle | 7:26 |
| 2 | Suzu Suzuki defeated Saya Iida | 5 Star Grand Prix tournament match | 6:56 |
| 3 | Maika defeated Unagi Sayaka | 5 Star Grand Prix tournament match | 6:50 |
| 4 | Mai Sakurai vs. Risa Sera ended in a Double Count-Out | 5 Star Grand Prix tournament match | 7:01 |
| 5 | Mirai defeated Mina Shirakawa | 5 Star Grand Prix tournament match | 10:35 |
| 6 | Saki Kashima defeated Utami Hayashishita | 5 Star Grand Prix tournament match | 6:53 |
| 7 | Syuri defeated Saki | 5 Star Grand Prix tournament match | 11:52 |
| 8 | Starlight Kid defeated Natsupoi | 5 Star Grand Prix tournament match | 13:26 |

=== Night 16 ===
Night 16 (September 18)
| No. | Results | Stipulations | Times |
|---|---|---|---|
| 1 | Queen's Quest (Utami Hayashishita and Lady C) defeated Stars (Momo Kohgo and Saya Iida) | Tag team match | 6:52 |
| 2 | Koguma defeated Unagi Sayaka | 5 Star Grand Prix tournament match | 6:15 |
| 3 | Saki defeated Mai Sakurai | 5 Star Grand Prix tournament match | 6:04 |
| 4 | Starlight Kid defeated Mina Shirakawa | 5 Star Grand Prix tournament match | 9:27 |
| 5 | Giulia defeated Ami Sourei | 5 Star Grand Prix tournament match | 12:20 |
| 6 | Saya Kamitani vs. Mirai ended in a time-limit draw | 5 Star Grand Prix tournament match | 15:00 |
| 7 | Tam Nakano defeated Risa Sera | 5 Star Grand Prix tournament match | 12:38 |
| 8 | Suzu Suzuki defeated Momo Watanabe | 5 Star Grand Prix tournament match | 13:27 |

=== Night 17 ===
Night 17 (September 19)
| No. | Results | Stipulations | Times |
|---|---|---|---|
| 1 | God's Eye (Mirai and Ami Sourei) defeated Queen's Quest (Saya Kamitani and Lady C) and Oedo Tai (Starlight Kid and Momo Watanabe) | 3-way Tag Battle | 7:57 |
| 2 | Maika defeated Mai Sakurai | 5 Star Grand Prix tournament match | 6:58 |
| 3 | AZM defeated Unagi Sayaka | 5 Star Grand Prix tournament match | 6:53 |
| 4 | Suzu Suzuki defeated Mina Shirakawa | 5 Star Grand Prix tournament match | 9:25 |
| 5 | Tam Nakano defeated Momo Kohgo | 5 Star Grand Prix tournament match | 7:21 |
| 6 | Risa Sera defeated Koguma | 5 Star Grand Prix tournament match | 8:15 |
| 7 | Utami Hayashishita defeated Saki | 5 Star Grand Prix tournament match | 11:28 |

=== Night 18 ===
Night 18 (September 23)
| No. | Results | Stipulations | Times |
|---|---|---|---|
| 1 | Suzu Suzuki defeated Hanan | 5 Star Grand Prix tournament match | 7:29 |
| 2 | Natsupoi defeated Saya Iida | 5 Star Grand Prix tournament match | 8:49 |
| 3 | Saki defeated Momo Kohgo | 5 Star Grand Prix tournament match | 6:23 |
| 4 | Koguma defeated AZM | 5 Star Grand Prix tournament match | 4:51 |
| 5 | Saki Kashima defeated Risa Sera | 5 Star Grand Prix tournament match | 6:49 |
| 6 | Starlight Kid defeated Mirai | 5 Star Grand Prix tournament match | 10:24 |
| 7 | Mina Shirakawa defeated Saya Kamitani | 5 Star Grand Prix tournament match | 13:08 |
| 8 | Momo Watanabe defeated Giulia | 5 Star Grand Prix tournament match | 11:21 |
| 9 | Mayu Iwatani defeated Hazuki | 5 Star Grand Prix tournament match | 10:20 |
| 10 | Syuri defeated Tam Nakano | 5 Star Grand Prix tournament match | 14:53 |

=== Night 19 ===
Night 19 (September 24)
| No. | Results | Stipulations | Times |
|---|---|---|---|
| 1 | Queen's Quest (Lady C and Hina) defeated Oedo Tai (Rina and Ruaka) | Tag team match | 6:50 |
| 2 | Hanan defeated Mina Shirakawa | 5 Star Grand Prix tournament match | 6:40 |
| 3 | Momo Kohgo defeated Maika | 5 Star Grand Prix tournament match | 5:27 |
| 4 | Starlight Kid defeated Saya Iida | 5 Star Grand Prix tournament match | 7:19 |
| 5 | Suzu Suzuki defeated Ami Sourei | 5 Star Grand Prix tournament match | 10:31 |
| 6 | Himeka defeated Unagi Sayaka | 5 Star Grand Prix tournament match | 9:03 |
| 7 | Momo Watanabe defeated Mayu Iwatani | 5 Star Grand Prix tournament match | 11:32 |
| 8 | Utami Hayashishita defeated Tam Nakano | 5 Star Grand Prix tournament match | 9:03 |
| 9 | Giulia defeated Saya Kamitani | 5 Star Grand Prix tournament match | 14:49 |
| 10 | AZM (c) defeated Hazuki and Fukigen Death | Three-way match for the High Speed Championship | 7:44 |
(c) / – the champion(s) heading into the match

=== Stardom in Showcase vol. 2 ===
Stardom in Showcase vol.2 (September 25)
| No. | Results | Stipulations | Times |
|---|---|---|---|
| 1 | Hanan defeated Saya Iida | 5 Star Grand Prix tournament match | 6:29 |
| 2 | Suzu Suzuki defeated Starlight Kid | 5 Star Grand Prix tournament match | 14:11 |

=== Night 20 ===
Finals (October 1)
| No. | Results | Stipulations | Times |
|---|---|---|---|
| 1^{P} | Mirai defeated Saya Iida | 5 Star Grand Prix tournament match | 6:57 |
| 2 | Mina Shirakawa defeated Natsupoi | 5 Star Grand Prix tournament match | 7:50 |
| 3 | Momo Watanabe defeated Hazuki | 5 Star Grand Prix tournament match | 10:34 |
| 4 | Saya Kamitani vs. Ami Sourei ended in a Double Count-Out | 5 Star Grand Prix tournament match | 8:21 |
| 5 | Mayu Iwatani defeated Starlight Kid | 5 Star Grand Prix tournament match | 13:09 |
| 6 | Giulia vs. Suzu Suzuki ended in a time-limit draw | 5 Star Grand Prix tournament match | 15:00 |
| 7 | Unagi Sayaka defeated Momo Kohgo | 5 Star Grand Prix tournament match | 5:24 |
| 8 | Saki Kashima defeated AZM | 5 Star Grand Prix tournament match | 0:44 |
| 9 | Koguma defeated Utami Hayashishita | 5 Star Grand Prix tournament match | 6:01 |
| 10 | Tam Nakano defeated Saki | 5 Star Grand Prix tournament match | 7:36 |
| 11 | Maika vs. Himeka ended in a Double Knockout | 5 Star Grand Prix tournament match | 9:57 |
| 12 | Risa Sera defeated Syuri | 5 Star Grand Prix tournament match | 12:11 |
| 13 | Giulia defeated Tam Nakano | 5 Star Grand Prix tournament final match | 25:37 |
P / – the match was broadcast on the pre-show

== See also ==
- G1 Climax
- N-1 Victory
