= Stardom New Blood 5 =

2022 World Wonder Ring Stardom event

New Blood 5
- Promotion: World Wonder Ring Stardom
- Date: October 19, 2022
- City: Tokyo, Japan
- Venue: Shinjuku Sumitomo Hall
- Attendance: 418

Event chronology
← Previous; Stardom in Showcase vol.2	Next → Hiroshima Goddess Festival

New Blood chronology
← Previous; New Blood 4	Next → New Blood 6

Stardom New Blood 5 (スターダムニューブラッド5, Sutādamunyūburaddo 5) was a professional wrestling event promoted by World Wonder Ring Stardom. The event took place on October 19, 2022, in Tokyo, Japan at the Shinjuku Sumitomo Hall, with limited attendance due in part to the ongoing COVID-19 pandemic at the time.

Six matches were contested at the event. In the main event, Ami Sourei defeated Hanan to win the Future of Stardom Championship.

== Production ==
=== Background ===
The "New Blood" is a series of events that mainly focus on matches where rookie wrestlers, usually with three or less years of in-ring experience, evolve. Besides wrestlers from Stardom, various superstars from multiple promotions of the Japanese independent scene are invited to compete in bouts that are usually going under the stipulation of singles or tag team matches.

The show featured six professional wrestling matches that resulted from scripted storylines, where wrestlers portrayed villains, heroes, or less distinguishable characters in the scripted events that built tension and culminated in a wrestling match or series of matches. The event's press conference took place on August 3, 2022, and was broadcast live on Stardom's YouTube channel.

=== Event ===
The entire show was broadcast free on Stardom's YouTube Channel. The first match saw Stars' Momo Kohgo picking up a victory upon JTO's Rhythm. The second bout portrayed Prominence's Suzu Suzuki & Shinsyu Girls Pro Wrestling (SGP)'s Ancham defeating Lady C & Hina. Next, Rina, Wrestling of Darkness 666's Ram Kaicho & Linda successfully faced Mina Shirakawa, Waka Tsukiyama & Ganbare Pro-Wrestling's Yuna Mizumori. The fourth match saw Tomoka Inaba, Mirai & World Woman Pro-Wrestling Diana's Nanami defeated by Starlight Kid, Ruaka & Haruka Umesaki. Haruka joined Oedo Tai and changed her gimmick name to "Karma". She would only use this gimmick while strictly fighting in Stardom matches, whilst going under her real name in other promotions. After the match, Nanami was presented as God's Eye's newest member. The next bout saw Donna Del Mondo's Mai Sakurai picking up a victory over P.P.P. Tokyo's Chanyota.

The main event portrayed the bout between Ami Sourei and Hanan for the Future of Stardom Championship. God's Eye's rookie succeeded in defeating Stars' stable member, ending the latter's reign at 294 days and at a record of ten successful consecutive defenses.

== Results ==
No.	Results	Stipulations	Times
1	Momo Kohgo defeated rhythm	Singles match	9:55
2	Ancham and Suzu Suzuki defeated Queen's Quest (Hina and Lady C)	Tag team match	7:52
3	Linda, Ram Kaicho and Rina defeated Cosmic Angels (Mina Shirakawa and Waka Tsukiyama) and Yuna Mizumori	Six-woman tag team match	11:18
4	Karma and Oedo Tai (Ruaka and Starlight Kid) defeated God's Eye (Mirai and Tomoka Inaba) and Nanami	Six-woman tag team match	13:50
5	Mai Sakurai defeated Chanyota	Singles match	9:55
6	Ami Sourei defeated Hanan (c)	Singles match for the Future of Stardom Championship	12:03
(c) / – the champion(s) heading into the match
