= Momoka Hanazono =

Japanese professional wrestler

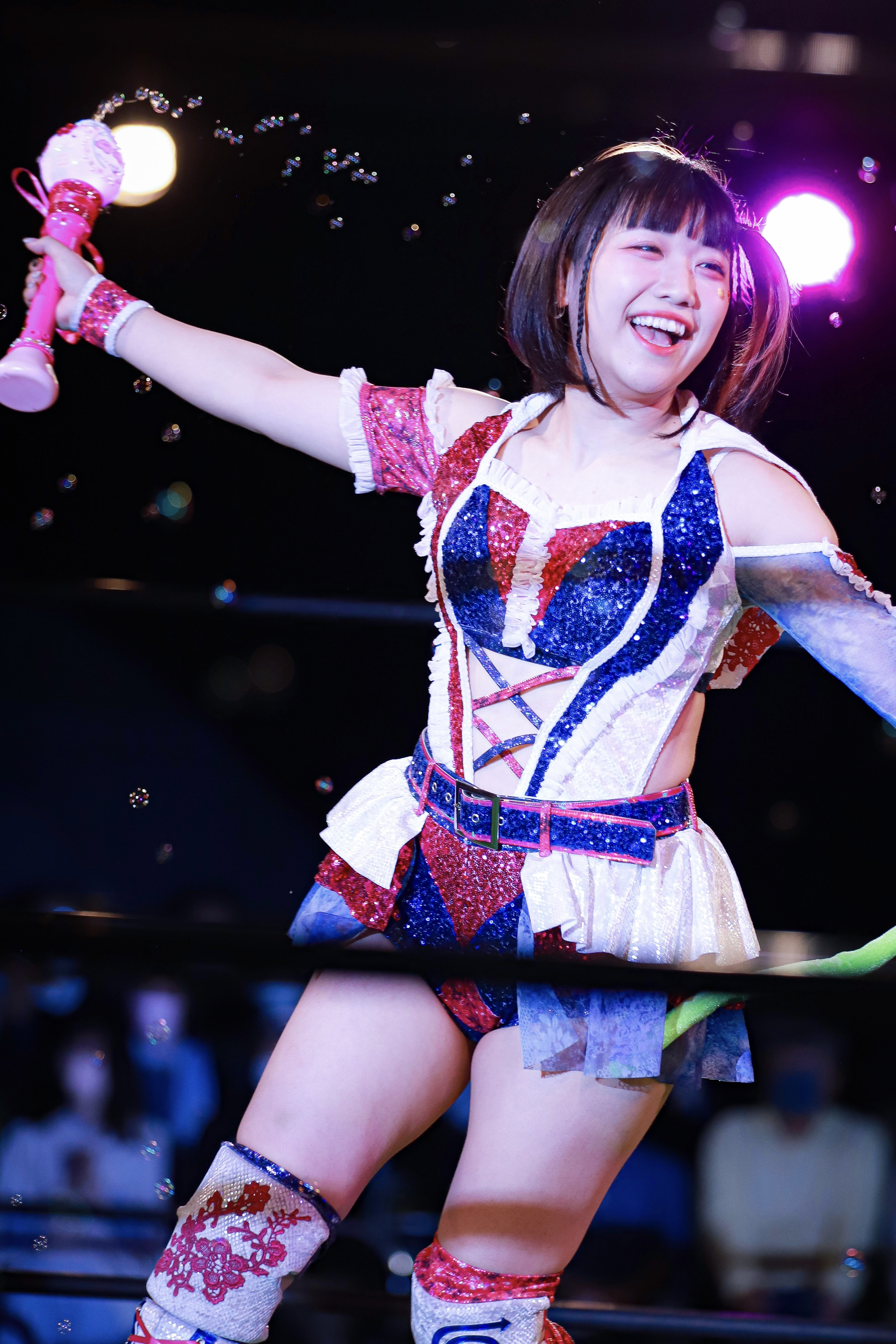
- Hanazono in April 2023

Personal information
- Born: November 17, 1999 (age 27) Osaka, Japan

Professional wrestling career
- Ring name: Momoka Hanazono
- Billed height: 148 cm (4 ft 10 in)
- Billed weight: 50 kg (110 lb)
- Debut: 2018

Momoka Hanazono (花園桃花, Hanazono Momoka) (born November 17, 1999) is a Japanese professional wrestler currently working as a freelancer and is best known for her time in the Japanese promotions Oz Academy and Colega Pro Wrestling.

== Professional wrestling career ==
=== Independent circuit (2018-present) ===
As a freelancer, Hanazono is known for her tenures with various promotions from the Japanese independent scene. She made her professional wrestling debut at a house show promoted by Reina Pro Wrestling on November 19, 2018, where she teamed up with Risa Sera in a losing effort against Giulia and Sae. On one of the nights of the 2022 edition of the D-Oh Grand Prix from November 13, 2021, Hanazono teamed up with Yuji Okabayashi and Yusuke Okada in a losing effort against The 37Kamiina (Konosuke Takeshita, Shunma Katsumata) and Saki Akai as a result of six-person mixed tag team match.

=== Oz Academy (2020-present) ===
Hanazono made her debut in Oz Academy on December 30, 2020, at OZ Academy The End Of The Year where she teamed up with Ozaki-gun (Maya Yukihi and Yumi Ohka) in a losing effort against Itsuki Aoki, Kaori Yoneyama and Tsubasa Kuragaki. She continued to make sporadic appearances and competing in the promotion's top events. At the promotion's 25th Anniversary Year show from January 10, 2021, where she teamed up with Akino in a losing effort against Beast Friend (Aja Kong and Hiroyo Matsumoto). At OZ Academy Battle Big Bonus In Okinawa, Hanazono won the first title of her career, the Oz Academy Pioneer title by defeating Kaori Yoneyama and Mask Do Hanahana in a three-way match.

=== World Wonder Ring Stardom (2022-present) ===
Hanazono made her first appearance in World Wonder Ring Stardom at Stardom New Blood 2 on May 13 where she teamed up with Waka Tsukiyama in a losing effort against God's Eye (Mirai and Ami Sourei). At Stardom New Blood 4 on August 26, 2022, Hanazono teamed up with Tsukiyama again, this time falling short against Ram Kaicho and Rina. At Stardom Gold Rush on November 3, 2022, she unsuccessfully challenged AZM for the High Speed Championship.

She is scheduled to team up with Momo Kohgo at New Blood 7 on January 20, 2023 and compete against God's Eye (Ami Sourei and Nanami) in the first rounds of the New Blood Tag Team Championship inaugural tournament. At Stardom Supreme Fight 2023 on February 4, she is scheduled to compete in a Call your shot match in which the winner gets to challenge for the title of their choice. She will compete against Mayu Iwatani, Momo Kohgo, Mina Shirakawa, Mariah May, Tam Nakano, Natsupoi, Waka Tsukiyama, Miyu Amasaki, Saki Kashima, Natsuko Tora, Thekla, Mai Sakurai and one more opponent to be announced.

Hanazono is also involved with the Osaka joshi wrestling promotion, 2point5 Joshi Pro Wrestling.

== Championships and accomplishments ==
- DDT Pro-Wrestling
  - Ironman Heavymetalweight Championship (1 time)
- Dream Star Fighting Marigold
  - Independent World Junior Heavyweight Championship (1 time, current)
- Oz Academy
  - Oz Academy Pioneer 3-Way Championship (1 time)
- Pro-Wrestling Shi-En
  - "I Love Shi-En" Championship (1 time)
- Pro Wrestling Wave
  - Wave Tag Team Championship (2 times, current) – with Kohaku
  - Catch the Wave Award (1 time)
    - Fighting Spirit Award (2024)
