= Historic X-Over =

2022 professional wrestling event

- Promotional poster featuring various NJPW and Stardom wrestlers.
- Promotion(s): New Japan Pro-Wrestling; World Wonder Ring Stardom
- Date: November 20, 2022
- City: Tokyo, Japan
- Venue: Ariake Arena
- Attendance: 7,102

Historic X-Over chronology
← Previous; First	Next → Historic X-Over 2

New Japan Pro-Wrestling event chronology
← Previous; Battle Autumn '22	Next → World Tag League & Super Jr. Tag League; Wrestle Kingdom 17

World Wonder Ring Stardom event chronology
← Previous; Gold Rush 2022	Next → Stardom in Showcase vol.3

Historic X-Over (pronounced: Historic Crossover) was a professional wrestling event co-promoted by New Japan Pro-Wrestling (NJPW) and World Wonder Ring Stardom (Stardom). It took place on November 20, 2022, at the Ariake Arena in Tokyo, Japan.

== Production ==
=== Background ===
On January 31, 2012, card game company Bushiroad fully acquired New Japan Pro-Wrestling (NJPW) from video game developer Yuke's. On October 17, 2019, Bushiroad announced in a press conference that they had also acquired World Wonder Ring Stardom (Stardom) from the company's President Rossy Ogawa, making Stardom the sister promotion of NJPW. Since Wrestle Kingdom 14, NJPW has featured Stardom matches at various NJPW events.

On June 6, 2022, during Bushiroad's 15th anniversary press conference, it was announced that NJPW and Stardom will hold its first shared event on November 20. NJPW President Takami Ohbari, revealed that the event would include at least two mixed tag team matches and that Stardom wrestlers would be featured on NJPW Strong events in the United States.

On July 29, NJPW and Stardom announced the creation of the IWGP Women's Championship, which would be defended at NJPW events in Japan and United States by Stardom wrestlers. The inaugural champion will be crowned at Historic X-Over.

=== Storylines ===
Historic X-Over featured eleven professional wrestling matches that result from scripted storylines, where wrestlers portray villains, heroes, or less distinguishable characters in the scripted events that build tension and culminate in a wrestling match or series of matches.

On August 27, 2022, representatives from fives stables would draw straws to determine which four stables out of the five would compete for in the IWGP Women's Championship tournament. The representatives were Giulia from Donna Del Mondo, Mayu Iwatani from Stars, Starlight Kid from Oedo Tai, and Utami Hayashishita from Queen's Quest with Syuri from God's Eye being eliminated due to drawing the shortest straw. With Iwatani, Hayashishita, Himeka from Donna Del Mondo and Momo Watanabe from Oedo Tai being chosen to compete on the Japanese side of the tournament, while Jazzy Gabert, Ava White, and Kairi (despite being Japanese) was announced to compete on the foreigner side with Kairi receiving a first round bye. On October 2 at Royal Quest II, Gabert defeated White to advanced to the semi-final while Iwatani defeated Watanabe and Hayashishita defeated Himeka on October 22 to advance. On October 23, Iwatani and Kairi would defeat Hayashishita and Gabert to advance to the finals at Historic X-Over.

On October 26, during a NJPW World Television Championship tournament match between Toru Yano and Great-O-Khan was the return of The Great Muta return to NJPW, where he cost Great-O-Khan's match by spraying green mist in his face. During backstage comments, Muta expressed his desire to tag with Yano and Kazuchika Okada at Historic X-Over to take on Great-O-Khan and the United Empire with the match being made official shortly after.

On November 5 at Battle Autumn, Will Ospreay successfully defended the IWGP United States Heavyweight Championship against Tetsuya Naito in the main event. After the match, Ospreay would lay down an open challenge for the title for Historic X-Over only to have the returning Shota Umino attack Ospreay and his fellow United Empire stable in the ring, accepting Ospreay's open challenge and setting up the title match.

== Results ==
No.	Results	Stipulations	Times
1^{P}	LA Dojo (Alex Coughlin, Clark Connors, Gabriel Kidd and Kevin Knight) defeated Kosei Fujita, Oskar Leube, Ryohei Oiwa and Yuto Nakashima by pinfall	Eight-man tag team match	9:39
2^{P}	Mirai won by last eliminating Super Strong Stardom Machine	15-woman Stardom Rambo	23:06
3	Chaos (Lio Rush, Tomohiro Ishii, Yoh and Yoshi-Hashi) defeated House of Torture (Dick Togo, Evil, Sho and Yujiro Takahashi) by pinfall	Eight-man tag team match	7:05
4	Queen's Quest (AZM, Lady C and Saya Kamitani) defeated Donna Del Mondo (Himeka, Mai Sakurai and Thekla) by pinfall	Six-woman tag team match	9:20
5	Giulia and Zack Sabre Jr. defeated Syuri and Tom Lawlor by pinfall	Mixed tag team match	10:29
6	meltear (Tam Nakano and Natsupoi) and Suzuki-gun (Taichi and Yoshinobu Kanemaru) defeated Black Desire (Momo Watanabe and Starlight Kid) and Suzuki-gun (El Desperado and Douki) by pinfall	Eight-Person mixed tag team match	12:01
7	Hiroshi Tanahashi and Utami Hayashishita defeated Hirooki Goto and Maika by pinfall	Mixed tag team match	9:36
8	United Empire (Aussie Open (Kyle Fletcher and Mark Davis), Catch 2/2 (Francesco Akira and TJP) and Gideon Grey) defeated Los Ingobernables de Japon (Bushi, Hiromu Takahashi, Sanada, Shingo Takagi and Tetsuya Naito) by pinfall	Ten-man tag team match	9:55
9	Chaos (Kazuchika Okada and Toru Yano) and The Great Muta defeated United Empire (Great-O-Khan, Jeff Cobb and Aaron Henare) by pinfall	Six-man tag team match	9:48
10	Will Ospreay (c) defeated Shota Umino by pinfall	Singles match for the IWGP United States Heavyweight Championship	23:30
11	Kairi defeated Mayu Iwatani by pinfall	Tournament Final for the inaugural IWGP Women's Championship	25:28
(c) / – the champion(s) heading into the match; P / – the match was broadcast on the pre-show

=== IWGP Women's Championship tournament ===
Round 1 Royal Quest II (October 2); IWGP Women's Championship Tournament First Round (October 22)
Mayu Iwatani	Pin
Momo Watanabe	12:32
Utami Hayashishita	Pin
Himeka	11:41
Jazzy Gabert	Pin
Ava White	10:34
Kairi	Bye
–

Semifinals; Goddesses of Stardom Tag League 2022; Night 1 (October 23)
Mayu Iwatani	Pin
Utami Hayashishita	14:51
Jazzy Gabert	12:24
Kairi	Pin

Finals; Historic X-Over (November 20)
Mayu Iwatani	25:28
Kairi	Pin

=== Stardom Rambo entrances and eliminations ===
Draw	Entrant	Order	Eliminated by	Elimination(s)
1	Mirai	–	Winner	3
2	Ami Sohrei	11	Saki Kashima	2
3	Saya Iida	1	Natsuko Tora	0
4	Natsuko Tora	6	Hazuki	1
5	Hanan	8	Saki Kashima	1
6	Hina	4	Ruaka	2
7	Rina	7	Hanan	0
8	Hazuki	10	Saki Kashima	1
9	Koguma	9	Saki Kashima	0
10	Momo Kohgo	2	Ami Sourei and Hina	0
11	Waka Tsukiyama	3	Ami Sourei and Hina	0
12	Saki Kashima	13	Mirai	5
13	Ruaka	5	Mirai	1
14	Miyu Amasaki	12	Saki Kashima	0
15	Super Strong Stardom Machine	14	Mirai	0

== See also ==
- 2022 in professional wrestling
- List of major NJPW events
- List of major World Wonder Ring Stardom events
