= Future of Stardom Championship =

Professional wrestling championship

- The Future of Stardom Championship belt

Details
- Promotion: World Wonder Ring Stardom
- Date established: February 18, 2018
- Current champion: Ranna Yagami
- Date won: March 15, 2026
Statistics
- First champion: Starlight Kid
- Most reigns: All titleholders (1)
- Longest reign: Rina (512 days)
- Shortest reign: Mina Shirakawa (13 days)
- Oldest champion: Unagi Sayaka (34 years, 10 months and 15 days)
- Youngest champion: Rina (16 years, 4 months and 14 days)
- Heaviest champion: Hanako (176 lb (80 kg))
- Lightest champion: Starlight Kid (99 lb (45 kg))

The Future of Stardom Championship (フューチャー・オブ・スターダム王座, Fu~yūchā Obu Sutādamu Ōza) is a women's professional wrestling championship owned by the World Wonder Ring Stardom promotion. The title was introduced on February 18, 2018, and the inaugural champion was crowned on March 28, when Starlight Kid defeated Shiki Shibusawa in the finals of a five-woman single-elimination tournament. Initially, in order for a wrestler to challenge for the title, they must have been under twenty years old or have less than two years of experience in professional wrestling. But on December 20, 2020, the experience level requirement for the title was changed from two years to less than three years of wrestling experience, however wrestlers under 20 may still challenge regardless of years' experience. In 2022, the championship became the property of Stardom's developmental sub-brand of New Blood alongside the New Blood Tag Team Championship.

Like most professional wrestling championships, the title is won as a result of a scripted match. There have been a total of fourteen reigns shared among fourteen different wrestlers and two vacancies. The current champion is Ranna Yagami who is in her first reign. She won the title by defeating Hanako at Stardom Cinderella Tournament: Night 5 in Yokohama, Japan on March 15, 2026.

== Title history ==
=== Vacant championship tournament (2021) ===
Due to Saya Iida relinquishing the title after suffering an injury, a seven-woman tournament to crown a new champion was announced to kick off on the second night of the Stardom Cinderella Tournament 2021 on May 14, 2021, and culminated on July 4 at Yokohama Dream Cinderella 2021 in Summer.

Round 1 (May 14, 15, June 8)
Mina Shirakawa	5:01
Ruaka	Pin
Rina	5:43
Hina	Pin
Unagi Sayaka	6:21
Lady C	Pin

Round 2 (June 8)
Mina Shirakawa	7:50
Hina	Pin
Unagi Sayaka	8:53
Hanan	Pin

Final (July 4)
Mina Shirakawa	Pin
Unagi Sayaka	16:58

== Reigns ==
As of October 27, 2026, there have been a total of fourteen reigns shared between fourteen different champions and two vacancies. Starlight Kid was the inaugural champion. Rina has the longest reign at 512 days, while Mina Shirakawa has the shortest at 13 days. Unagi Sayaka is the oldest champion at 34 years old, while Rina is the youngest at 16 years old.

The current champion is Ranna Yagami who is in her first reign. She won the title by defeating Hanako at Stardom Cinderella Tournament: Night 5 in Yokohama, Japan on March 15, 2026.

Key
No.	Overall reign number
Reign	Reign number for the specific champion
Days	Number of days held
Defenses	Number of successful defenses
+	Current reign is changing daily

No.	Champion	Championship change			Reign statistics			Notes	Ref.
No.	Champion	Date	Event	Location	Reign	Days	Defenses	Notes	Ref.
World Wonder Ring Stardom (ST★RDOM)
1	Starlight Kid	March 28, 2018	Stardom Dream Slam in Tokyo	Tokyo, Japan	1	281	5	Defeated Shiki Shibusawa in the finals of a five-woman single-elimination tournament to become the inaugural champion.	
2	Utami Hayashishita	January 3, 2019	Stardom Dream Slam in Tokyo	Tokyo, Japan	1	409	6		
—	Vacated	February 16, 2020	New Years Stars - Day 7	Tokyo, Japan	—	—	—	After Hayashishita secured her sixth successful title defense against Saya Kamitani, she vacated the championship in order to pursue the Wonder of Stardom and the World of Stardom titles.	
3	Maika	July 17, 2020	Explode in Summer	Tokyo, Japan	1	156	2	Defeated Saya Iida and Saya Kamitani in a three-way match to win the vacant championship.	
4	Saya Iida	December 20, 2020	Osaka Dream Cinderella	Osaka, Japan	1	141	3	This was a three-way match, also involving Saya Kamitani.	
—	Vacated	May 10, 2021	—	—	—	—	—	The championship was vacated due to Saya Iida not being able to defend due to injury. A tournament to crown a new champion began on the second night of the Stardom Cinderella Tournament 2021.	
5	Mina Shirakawa	July 4, 2021	Yokohama Dream Cinderella 2021 in Summer	Yokohama, Japan	1	13	0	Defeated Unagi Sayaka in the finals of a 7-woman tournament to win the vacant championship.	
6	Unagi Sayaka	July 17, 2021	Cinderella Summer Tour 2021 In Tokyo	Tokyo, Japan	1	84	3		
7	Ruaka	October 9, 2021	10th Anniversary Grand Final Osaka Dream Cinderella	Osaka, Japan	1	81	2		
8	Hanan	December 29, 2021	Dream Queendom	Tokyo, Japan	1	294	10	During this reign, the title became a part of Stardom's developmental roster New Blood.	
World Wonder Ring Stardom: New Blood
9	Ami Sohrei	October 19, 2022	New Blood 5	Tokyo, Japan	1	205	3		
10	Rina	May 12, 2023	New Blood 8	Tokyo, Japan	1	512	12		
11	Miyu Amasaki	October 5, 2024	Nagoya Golden Fight	Nagoya, Japan	1	142	3		
12	Hina	February 24, 2025	Path of Thunder	Utsunomiya, Japan	1	215	7		
13	Hanako	September 27, 2025	Stardom in Korakuen	Tokyo, Japan	1	169	4		
14	Ranna Yagami	March 15, 2026	Stardom Cinderella Tournament (Night 5)	Yokohama, Japan	1	226+	11		

== Combined reigns ==
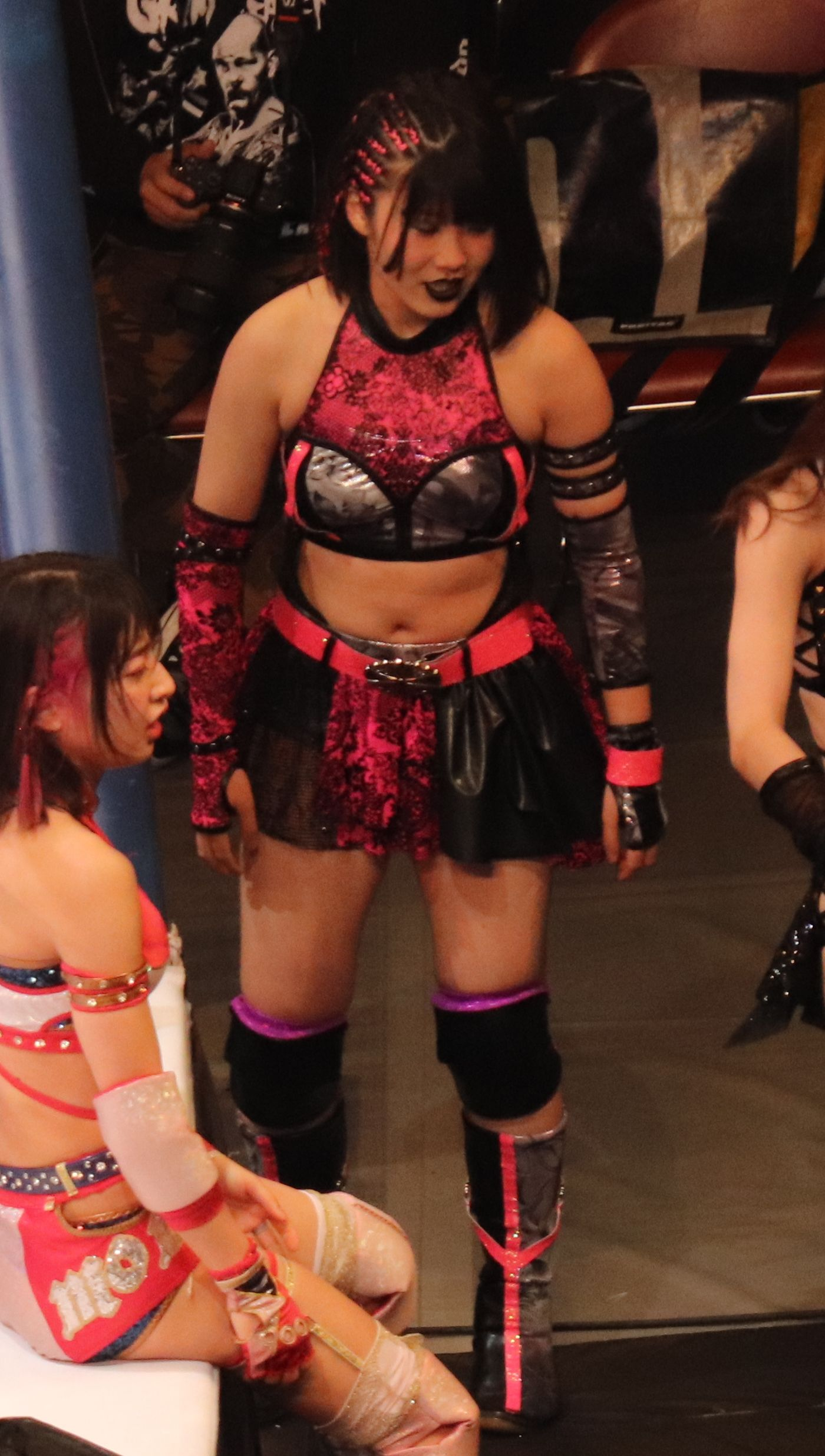
One-time, longest reigning champion, Rina.

As of October 27, 2026.

†	Indicates the current champion

Rank	Wrestler	No. of reigns	Combined defenses	Combined days
1	Rina	1	12	512
2	Utami Hayashishita	1	6	409
3	Hanan	1	10	294
4	Starlight Kid	1	5	281
5	Ranna Yagami †	1	11	226+
6	Hina	1	7	215
7	Ami Sohrei	1	3	205
8	Hanako	1	4	169
9	Maika	1	2	156
10	Miyu Amasaki	1	3	142
11	Saya Iida	1	3	141
12	Unagi Sayaka	1	3	84
13	Ruaka	1	2	81
14	Mina Shirakawa	1	0	13
