= Ruaka (wrestler) =

Japanese professional wrestler (born 2004)

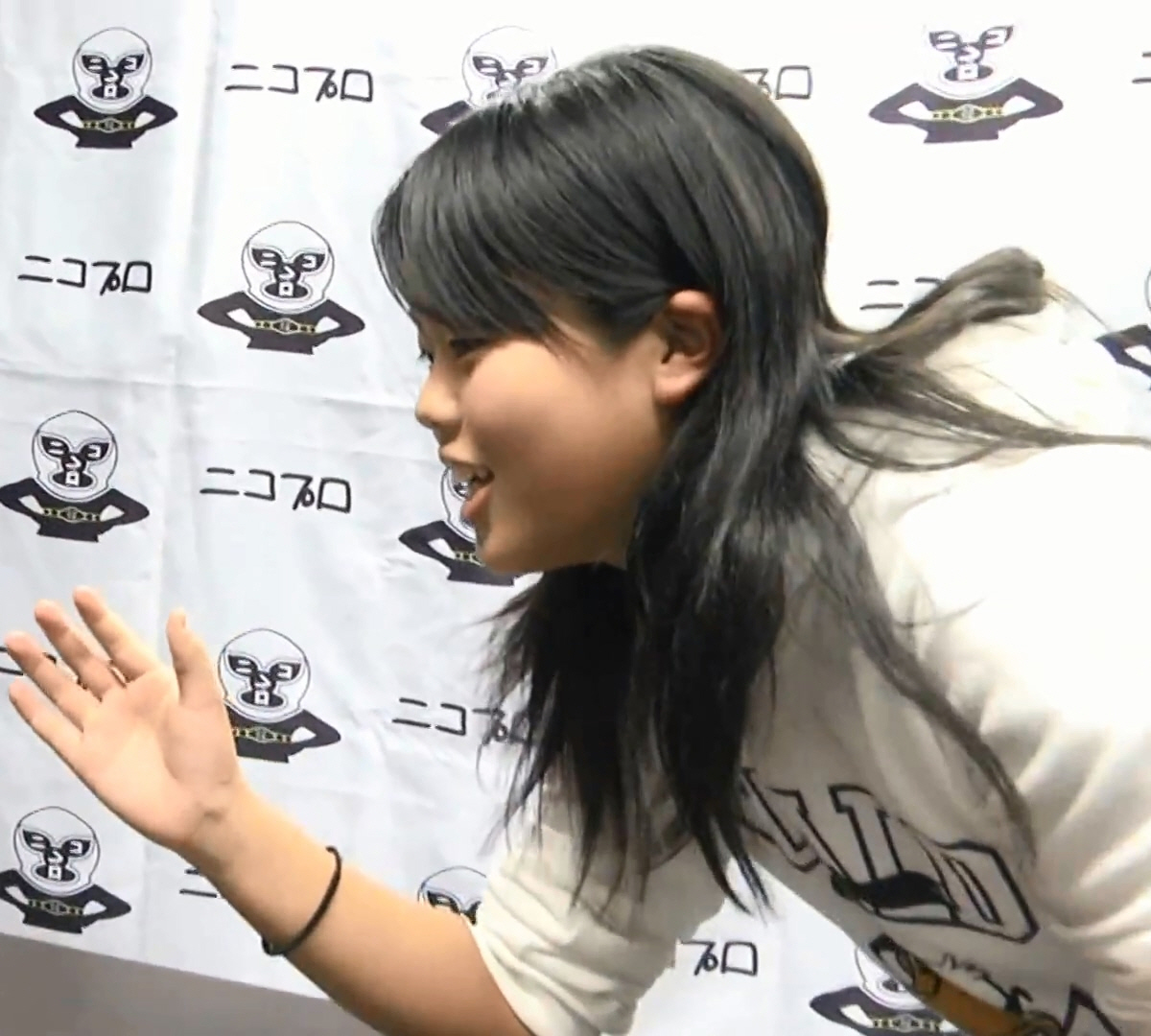
- Ruaka in December 2016

Personal information
- Born: 16 August 2004 (age 22) Tokyo, Japan

Professional wrestling career
- Ring name(s): Bear Dog; Ruaka
- Billed height: 164 cm (5 ft 5 in)
- Billed weight: 90 kg (198 lb)
- Trained by: Fuka
- Debut: 2016

Ruaka (琉悪夏, Ruaka; born 16 August 2004) is a Japanese professional wrestler. She works for World Wonder Ring Stardom, where she is a member of H.A.T.E. She is also a former Goddesses of Stardom Champion and Future of Stardom Champion.

== Professional wrestling career ==
=== World Wonder Ring Stardom (2016–present) ===
Ruaka made her professional wrestling debut under the ring name Ruaka at the early age of 12, at Goddesses Of Stars, an event promoted by World Wonder Ring Stardom on 20 November 2016 where she teamed up with Arisu Nanase in a losing effort to AZM and Natsuko Tora. At Mask Fiesta 2018 on 28 October 2018, Ruaka, under the ring name Bear Dog, teamed up with Black Jungle Fairy and Night Bear in a loss to Dame de Panko, La Gatita and Mayuchica.

At the 2019 Stardom Draft on 14 April 2019, J.A.N. was disbanded and Ruaka was drafted to the newly created International Army stable, later known as Tokyo Cyber Squad. At Yokohama Cinderella 2020 on 3 October 2020, Tokyo Cyber Squad was disbanded and Ruaka became unitless.

On the first night of the 2021 Cinderella Tournament from 10 April Ruaka fell short to Giulia in a first-round match, and on the second night from May 14 she fell short to Mina Shirakawa in a tournament for the vacant Future of Stardom Championship. In the Stardom 5 Star Grand Prix 2021, Ruaka fought in the "Blue Stars" Block obtaining a total of zero points. At Stardom 10th Anniversary Grand Final Osaka Dream Cinderella on October 9, Ruaka defeated Unagi Sayaka to win the Future of Stardom Championship.

=== Independent circuit (2017–present) ===
She competed for one time in Sendai Girls' Pro Wrestling in a dark exhibition match which took place at a house show from 6 April 2017 where she fell short to Manami.

== Championships and accomplishments ==
- World Wonder Ring Stardom
  - Future of Stardom Championship (1 time)
  - Goddesses of Stardom Championship (1 time) – with Natsuko Tora
  - Top Unit Trios Tournament (2021) – with Natsuko Tora and Saki Kashima
  - 5★Star GP Award (1 times)
    - 5★Star GP Technique Award (2026)
  - Stardom Year-End Award (1 time)
    - Best Unit Award (2021) as part of Oedo Tai, shared with Momo Watanabe, Natsuko Tora, Rina, Saki Kashima and Starlight Kid
