= Stardom in Showcase =

- Promotions: World Wonder Ring Stardom
- First event: Stardom in Showcase vol.1

The Stardom in Showcase (ショーケースのスターダム, Shōkēsu no sutādamu) was a series of professional wrestling events promoted by World Wonder Ring Stardom. The inaugural event took place on July 23, 2022. The series of pay-per-views mainly focused on a diversity of gimmick matches, only different from the singles match stipulation. Billed as respiro shows, the main tagline of these events was "Anything can happen".

== History ==
Vol.1, the inaugural Stardom in Showcase event, took place on July 23, 2022, in Nagoya at the Nagoya Congress Center. Two months later, Vol.2, the second event took place on September 25, 2022, in Tokyo at the Belle Salle Takadanobaba, establishing Stardom in Showcase as an annual event. Vol.3, the third event, took place on November 26, 2022, in Kawasaki at the Kawasaki City Todoroki Arena. Vol.4, the fourth event took place on February 26, 2023, in Kobe at the Kobe International Exhibition Hall.

== Dates and venues ==
#	Event	Date	City	Venue	Main Event	Notes	Ref
1	Stardom in Showcase vol.1	July 23, 2022	Nagoya, Aichi, Japan	Nagoya Congress Center	Yuu defeated Saya Kamitani and Starlight Kid	Three-way casket match	
2	Stardom in Showcase vol.2	September 25, 2022	Tokyo, Japan	Belle Salle Takadanobaba	Grim Reaper Army (Nanae Takahashi, Yuna Manase and Yuu) defeated Rossy Ogawa Bodyguard Army (Syuri and Queen's Quest (Lady C and Utami Hayashishita)) (with Rossy Ogawa)	Captain's Fall match	
3	Stardom in Showcase vol.3	November 26, 2022	Kawasaki, Kanagawa, Japan	Kawasaki City Todoroki Arena	Neo Stardom Army (Nanae Takahashi, Yuu and Reaper Mask) defeated Donna Del Mondo (Giulia, Thekla and Mai Sakurai)	Six-woman tag team exploding coffin match	
4	Stardom in Showcase vol.4	February 26, 2023	Kobe, Hyōgo, Japan	Kobe International Exhibition Hall	Stars (Mayu Iwatani, Hazuki and Koguma) defeated Queen's Quest (Utami Hayashishita, Saya Kamitani and Miyu Amasaki) and Oedo Tai (Natsuko Tora, Starlight Kid and Momo Watanabe)	Three-way elimination tag team match	
