= 7Upp =

Professional wrestling stable

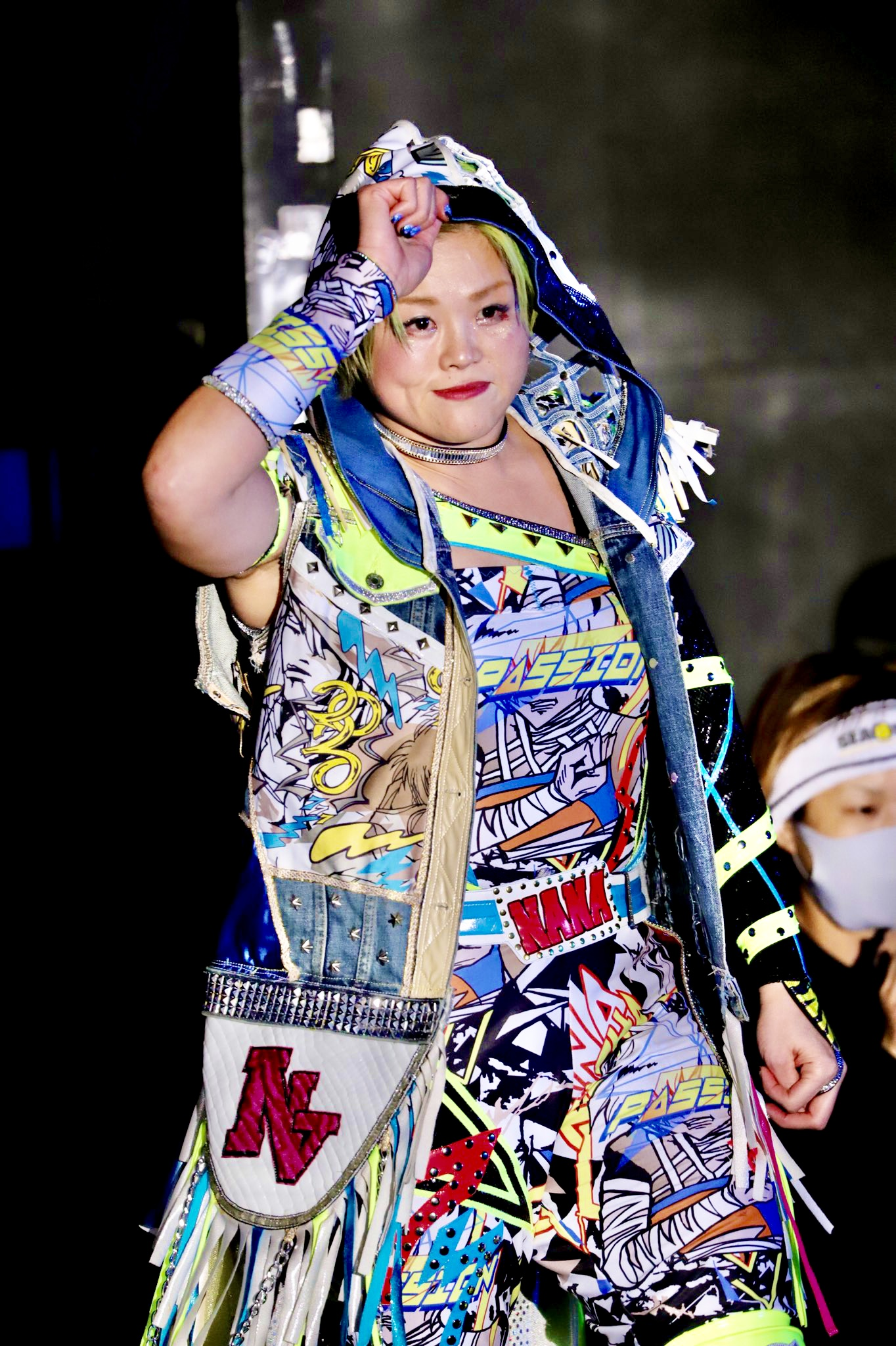
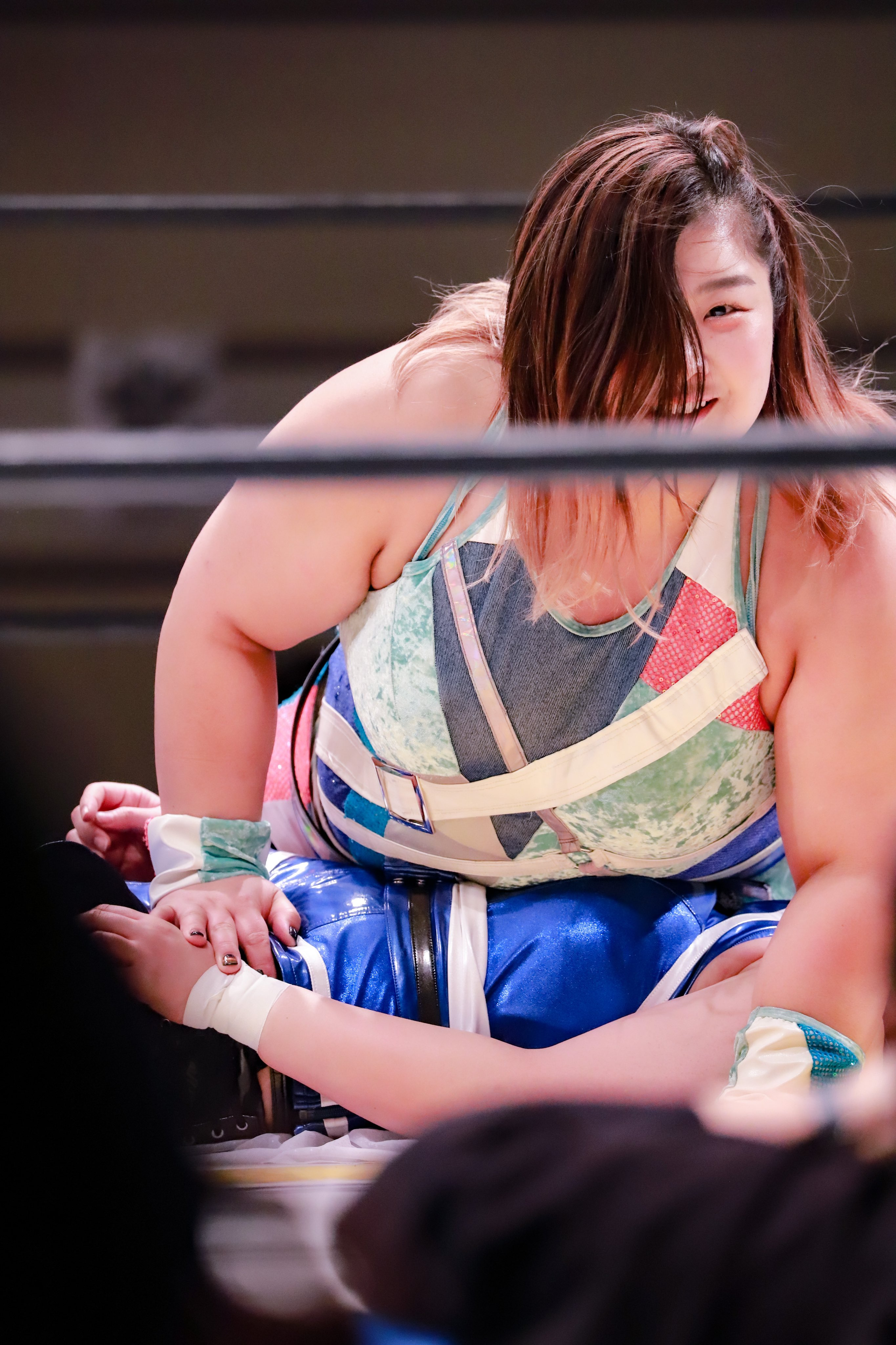
- Nanae Takahashi and Yuu

Tag team
- Members: Nanae Takahashi; Yuu
- Debut: September 25, 2022
- Disbanded: May 24, 2025
- Years active: 2022–2025

7Upp (7 アップ, 7 Appu), formerly known as Neo Stardom Army (ネオスターダム軍団, Neosutādamu gundan), was a Japanese professional wrestling tag team, consisting of Nanae Takahashi and Yuu, mainly performing in the Japanese professional wrestling promotion World Wonder Ring Stardom and also in the Japanese independent scene. The tag team originally activated as a stable led by Alpha Female which also consisted of Yuna Manase and Yuna Mizumori.

== History ==
=== Formation. Under Alpha Female's leadership (September 2022–May 2023) ===
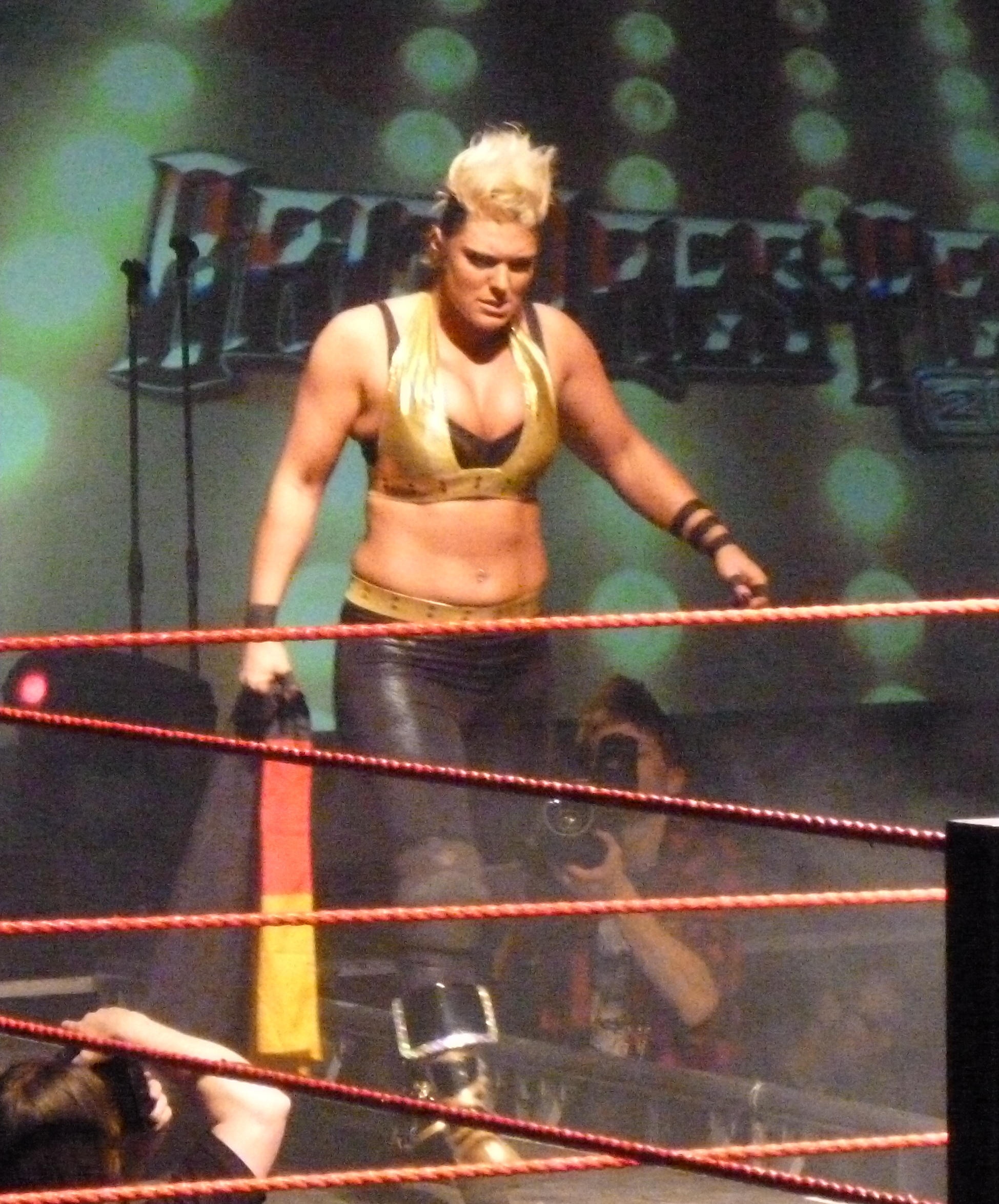
First leader of the stable period, Alpha Female.

At Stardom in Showcase vol.2, a non-canon event produced by World Wonder Ring Stardom on September 25, 2022, the chief executive producer Rossy Ogawa was a victim of various "grim reaper masked silhouettes" who kept attacking him for unknown reasons. At the event, he established Queen's Quest's leader Utami Hayashishita, Lady C and God's Eye's leader Syuri as his bodyguards. On the other corner, Yuu who was the first silhouette and unmasked at the previous Showcase event had also established two tag partners presented under the same masks. They were later revealed to be Nanae Takahashi and Yuna Manase on the event's night as they succeeded in defeating Rossy's Bodyguard Army. Minutes later, a video of Alpha Female was played, showing her criticizing the current situation in Stardom as she was announcing her return to the company on October 23, 2022, for the IWGP Women's Championship inaugural tournament. Together with Takahashi, Manase and Yuu, Alpha Female officially formed the "Neo Stardom Army" unit and declared the destruction over Stardom's roster.

Nanae Takahashi and Yuu fought in the 2022 edition of the Goddesses of Stardom Tag League, participating in the "Blue Goddess Block" under the tag name of 7Upp where they competed against the teams of BMI2000 (Natsuko Tora and Ruaka), FWC (Hazuki and Koguma), MaiHime (Maika and Himeka), The New Eras (Mirai and Ami Sourei), 02 line (AZM and Miyu Amasaki), Kawild Venus (Mina Shirakawa and Saki), and wing★gori (Hanan and Saya Iida). Alpha Female unsuccessfully challenged Mayu Iwatani for the SWA World Championship at Hiroshima Goddess Festival on November 3, 2022. Takahashi and Yuu unsuccessfully fought Maika and Himeka in one of their Goddess Tag League matches on November 19, 2022, at Stardom Gold Rush. At Stardom in Showcase vol.3 on November 26, 2022, Nanae Takahashi and Yuu will teamed up with a mystery partner announced as the newest member of the stable and defeated Donna Del Mondo's Giulia, Thekla and Mai Sakurai in a casket match. The mystery partner's identity was however never revealed after the bout. Takahashi and Yuu began the night by defeating Saya Iida and Hanan in one of their tag league matches. At Stardom Dream Queendom 2 on December 29, 2022, Nanae Takahashi and Yuu defeated meltear (Tam Nakano and Natsupoi) to win the Goddesses of Stardom Championship.

At Stardom New Blood 7 on January 20, 2023, Nanae Takahashi defeated Waka Tsukiyama. At Stardom Supreme Fight 2023 on February 4, Yuna Mizumori unsuccessfully competed in a Naniwa Roulette Single Elimination Tournament to determine the #1 contender to any Stardom championship won by Saki Kashima. On the same night, Nanae Takahashi and Yuu successfully defended the Goddesses of Stardom Championship against MaiHime (Maika and Himeka). At Stardom in Showcase vol.4 on February 26, 2023, Yuna Mizumori teamed up with Lady C and Saya Iida as a trio of masked superstars and defeated another trio of "masked momos" (Note: The reaper-masked characters symbolize unidentified wrestlers announced by Stardom to compete in various events, usually non-canon shows such as the "Showcase" branch, which were usually revealed on the day of the respective shows or kept secret for a longer period of time.) (with one of them later confirmed to be in fact Donna Del Mondo's Thekla). At Stardom New Blood Premium on March 25, 2023, Nanae Takahashi teamed up with Kairi in a losing effort against Cosmic Angels (Tam Nakano and Waka Tsukiyama) in a match in which Tsukiyama picked up her first victory in Stardom. In the 2023 edition of the Cinderella Tournament, Nanae Takahashi drew with Utami Hayasishita in the first rounds, and Yuna Mizumori fell short to Ami Sourei in the same phase. At Stardom All Star Grand Queendom on April 23, 2023, Yuna Mizumori competed in a Yokohama Rumble match won by Mai Sakurai and Nanae Takahashi and Yuu dropped the Goddesses of Stardom Championship to The New Eras (Ami Sourei and Mirai). At Stardom Fukuoka Goddess Legend on May 4, 2023, Yuna Mizumori competed in a Fukuoka Rumble match won by Suzu Suzuki. At Stardom New Blood 8 on May 12, 2023, Nanae Takahashi defeated Ruaka in one of her "passion injection" (Note: As the most experienced competitor of the roster, veteran Nanae Takahashi began organizing the so-called "Passion injection matches" in which she mainly faced newer wrestlers from the scene, or wrestlers who she considered to not take wrestling seriously.) series of bouts. At Stardom Flashing Champions 2023 on May 27, Takahashi teamed up with Yuna Mizumori and Hanako in a losing effort against Maika, Suzu Suzuki and Mei Seira. This was the last time the Neo Stardom Army has held a match under the stable's banner, hinting the slow fading of the unit due to the controversial long-time no showing of leader Alpha Female, member Yuna Manase and of the other mysterious masked reaper allies. At Stardom New Blood 9 on June 2, 2023, Takahashi defeated Mai Sakurai in the passion injection match series.

=== Reducing to 7Upp (May 2023–May 2025) ===
At Stardom Sunshine 2023 on June 25, Takahashi defeated Hanako in another passion injection bout. At Stardom Mid Summer Champions 2023 on July 8, Yuna Mizumori teamed up with Waka Tsukiyama to defeat Queen's Quest (Miyu Amasaki and Hina), and Nanae Takahashi defeated Starlight Kid in another passion injection bout. Mizumori silently defected the unit to join Cosmic Angels in the process. Since then, the stable officially reduced to the tag team of Nanae Takahashi and Yuu. At Stardom Midsummer Festival on August 19, 2023, Takahashi teamed up with her old "NanaMomo" tag team partner Momoe Nakanishi and Jaguar Yokota to defeat Black Desire (Momo Watanabe, Starlight Kid) and 7Upp teammate Yuu in six-woman tag team action.

The tag team of Yuu and Takahashi officially dissolved after Takahashi's retirement from professional wrestling which occurred at Marigold Shine Forever 2025 on May 24, where the latter fell short to Miku Aono.

=== Independent scene (2022–2025) ===
Due to every member of the stable being part freelancers, they use to compete in various of the Japanese independent scene and worldwide independent circuit promotions. At Wrestle Queendom 5, an event promoted by Pro-Wrestling: EVE on November 13, 2022, Yuu defeated Laura Di Matteo to win the Pro-Wrestling: EVE International Championship.

==== New Japan Pro Wrestling (2022) ====
Due to being a Stardom unit, the members often competed in New Japan Pro Wrestling related events. On the first night of the Royal Quest II event from October 1, 2022, Alpha Female teamed up with Kanji in a losing effort against Ava White and Alex Windsor. On the second night on October 2, she defeated Ava White in the first rounds of the inaugural IWGP Women's Championship tournament.

== Members ==
*	Founding member
I	Leader

Member		Joined	Left
Yuna Manase	*	September 25, 2022 (Note: This was the first and last time Manase competed in Stardom and under the stable banner.)	
Alpha Female	*I	September 25, 2022	November 3, 2022 (Note: This was the last time Alpha Female competed in Stardom and under the stable banner.)
Masked Reaper(s)		September 25, 2022	February 26, 2023 (Note: This was the last time any masked reapers allied with the stable were seen.)
Yuna Mizumori		January 3, 2023	July 2, 2023
Nanae Takahashi	*	September 25, 2022	May 24, 2025
Yuu	*	September 25, 2022	May 24, 2025

== Affiliations ==
Affiliate	Members	Tenure	Type
Team 200 kg (Note: Team 200kg is a tag team under which Yuu evolves in the independent scene alongside Hashimoto. The latter was only considered an associate of her and Takahashi.)	Yuu; Chihiro Hashimoto	2022–2025	Tag team

== Championships and accomplishments ==
- Dream Star Fighting Marigold
  - Marigold Twin Star Championship (1 time, current) – Takahashi with Seri Yamaoka
- Marvelous That's Women Pro Wrestling
  - AAAW Tag Team Championship (1 time) – Yuu with Chihiro Hashimoto
- Professional Wrestling Just Tap Out
  - JTO Women's Championship (1 time) – Yuu
- Pro Wrestling Illustrated
  - Ranked Takahashi No. 105 of the top 150 female singles wrestlers in the PWI Women's 150 in 2022
  - Ranked Takahashi and Yuu No. 10 of the top 100 tag teams in the PWI Tag Team 100 in 2023
- Pro-Wrestling: EVE
  - Pro-Wrestling: EVE International Championship (1 time) – Yuu
- Pure-J
  - Pure-J Openweight Championship (1 time) – Yuu
- Sendai Girls' Pro Wrestling
  - Sendai Girls Tag Team Championship (2 times) – Yuu with Chihiro Hashimoto
- World Wonder Ring Stardom
  - Goddesses of Stardom Championship (1 time) – Takahashi and Yuu
  - Goddesses of Stardom Tag League (2022) – Takahashi and Yuu
