= Stardom in Showcase vol.3 =

2022 World Wonder Ring Stardom event

Stardom in Showcase vol. 3
- Promotional poster of the event
- Promotion: World Wonder Ring Stardom
- Date: November 26, 2022
- City: Kawasaki, Japan
- Venue: Kawasaki City Todoroki Arena
- Attendance: 778

Event chronology
| ← Previous; Historic X-Over | Next → New Blood 6 |

Stardom in Showcase chronology
| ← Previous vol.2 | Next → vol.4 |

Stardom in Showcase vol.3 (ショーケースのスターダムvol.3, Shōkēsu no sutādamu vol. 3) was a professional wrestling event promoted by World Wonder Ring Stardom. It was the third Stardom in Showcase event and took place on November 26, 2022, in Kawasaki at the Kawasaki City Todoroki Arena with a limited attendance due in part to the ongoing COVID-19 pandemic at the time.

== Production ==
=== Background ===
The Stardom in Showcase is a series of pay-per-views which mainly focuses on a diversity of gimmick matches, only different from the singles match stipulation. Billed as respiro shows, the main tagline of these events is "Anything can happen".

The show featured seven professional wrestling matches that resulted from scripted storylines, where wrestlers portrayed villains, heroes, or less distinguishable characters in the scripted events that built tension and culminated in a wrestling match or series of matches.

=== Event ===
The preshow match in which 7Upp (Nanae Takahashi & Yuu) defeated wing★gori (Hanan & Saya Iida) in one of the Goddess of Stardom Tag League matches was broadcast live on Stardom's YouTube channel. The first main card event saw AZM, Koguma, Starlight Kid, and Ram Kaicho facing off in a soccer-themed four-way match resembling the events from the group stages of the 2022 FIFA World Cup. Each wrestler wore different jerseys of various football nations. Koguma won the match and kept all the other wrestlers' jerseys as a prize. The third match saw Lady C getting a win over the Wonder of Stardom Champion Saya Kamitani, Himeka, and Momo Kohgo in a shampoo scramble to win a haircut from the main sponsor of the event, hairdressing saloon "ZEST". The next bout presented a "judo rules" match in which Mayu Iwatani, Hanan & Maika picked up a victory over Utami Hayashishita, Hina & Mirai. The match alluded to the wrestler's real-life judo sports background. The fifth match presented Natsuko Tora & Saki Kashima vs. Hazuki and a returning Sumire Natsu in a No Holds Barred Tag Team Match. The match was ruled a No Contest when additional members of Oedo Tai and STARS wouldn't stop brawling in the ring. After the match, Sumire attacked Hazuki and declared that she will be going to furtherly invade Stardom as a freelancer. The sixth bout saw Risa Sera, Suzu Suzuki & Hiragi Kurumi defeating the Goddess of Stardom Champions Tam Nakano & Natsupoi, and a returning Unagi Sayaka in a Six-Woman Hardcore Tag Team Match. After the bout concluded, the Prominence members challenged Starlight Kid, Saki Kashima & Momo Watanabe for the Artist of Stardom Championship at Dream Queendom on December 29, 2022, which the champion team accepted.

The main event presented Nanae Takahashi, Yuu, and a masked reaper facing Donna Del Mondo's Giulia, Thekla & Mai Sakurai in an Exploding Coffin Six-Woman Tag Team Match. The Neo Stardom Army picked up the win after putting all the DDM members into the casket alongside Rossy Ogawa who was again a victim such as at the previous Showcase events. The masked reaper was announced to have joined the Neo Stardom Army but their identity was not revealed after the show.

== Results ==
| No. | Results | Stipulations | Times |
|---|---|---|---|
| 1^{P} | 7Upp (Nanae Takahashi and Yuu) defeated wing★gori (Hanan and Saya Iida) | Goddesses of Stardom Tag League group stage match | 8:13 |
| 2 | Koguma defeated AZM, Starlight Kid and Ram Kaicho | Falls Count Anywhere four-way match | 10:34 |
| 3 | Lady C defeated Saya Kamitani, Himeka and Momo Kohgo | Four-way match Lady C gets a hair makeover from sponsor hairdresser saloon. | 8:04 |
| 4 | Stars (Mayu Iwatani and Hanan) and Maika defeated Queen's Quest (Utami Hayashishita and Hina) and Mirai | Judo jacket rules match | 9:21 |
| 5 | Hazuki and Natsu Sumire vs. Oedo Tai (Natsuko Tora and Saki Kashima) ended in a no-contest | No Holds Barred Tag team match | 10:58 |
| 6 | Prominence (Risa Sera, Suzu Suzuki and Hiragi Kurumi) defeated Cosmic Angels (Tam Nakano, Natsupoi and Unagi Sayaka (Note: Sayaka was announced to make a one-day return to Stardom especially for the event.)) | Six-woman hardcore tag team match | 15:42 |
| 7 | Neo Stardom Army (Nanae Takahashi, Yuu and Reaper Mask) defeated Donna Del Mondo (Giulia, Thekla and Mai Sakurai) | Six-woman tag team exploding coffin match | 14:45 |
P / – the match was broadcast on the pre-show
