= Stardom in Showcase vol.4 =

2023 World Wonder Ring Stardom event

Stardom in Showcase vol. 4
- Promotional poster of the event
- Promotion: World Wonder Ring Stardom
- Date: February 26, 2023
- City: Kobe, Japan
- Venue: Kobe International Exhibition Hall
- Attendance: 702

Event chronology
← Previous; Supreme Fight 2023	Next → New Blood Premium

Stardom in Showcase chronology
← Previous vol.3	Next → —

Stardom in Showcase vol.4 (ショーケースのスターダムvol.4, Shōkēsu no sutādamu vol. 4) was a professional wrestling event promoted by World Wonder Ring Stardom. It was the fourth Stardom in Showcase and took place on February 26, 2023, in Kobe at the Kobe International Exhibition Hall.

== Production ==
=== Background ===
The Stardom in Showcase is a series of pay-per-views which mainly focuses on a diversity of gimmick matches, only different from the singles match stipulation. Billed as respiro shows, the main tagline of these events is "Anything can happen".

The show featured seven professional wrestling matches that resulted from scripted storylines, where wrestlers portrayed villains, heroes, or less distinguishable characters in the scripted events that built tension and culminated in a wrestling match or series of matches.

=== Event ===
The show started with the comedic "triathlon" competition between Saya Iida and P.P.P. Tokyo's Chanyota which included three different types of contests. An arm wrestling match, a usual singles match and a muscular posing contest. Chanyota won the posing and the arm wrestling match while Iida imposed herself in the usual singles wrestling match. The second bout saw a Falls count anywhere match following an event which took place a couple of weeks before the show in which then-time High Speed Champion AZM and Rossy Ogawa celebrated AZM's 20th birthday with a couple of drinks at the bar ran by Sumire Natsu (in Japan, the age of twenty represents the legal elderliness for alcohol consumption). At the bar, Sumire attacked Ogawa which degenerated in the traditional four-way match of the "Showcase" branch. AZM picked up the victory after pinning Hanan. Since joining Cosmic Angels in late 2021, Waka Tsukiyama would undergo a long-term losing streak. Obviously not happy about it, unit leader Tam Nakano demanded that Tsukiyama must focus on getting a win and breaking her loss record, otherwise she would be kicked out of the stable. The situation degenerated in a Captain's fall six-woman elimination tag team match in which Tsukiyama teamed up with Mina Shirakawa and Mariah May in order to attempt to get a win against the stablemates team of Tam Nakano, Natsupoi and Saki to keep herself as a member of the unit (Nakano gave her an ultimatum to get a win several weeks before the event). Tsukiyama's team lost, however, Nakano decided to keep her into the unit and further team up with her to face Nanae Takahashi at Stardom New Blood Premium on March 25 and challenged Takahashi to bring up her best partner. The fourth match saw the Super Stardom Machine Army, three masked characters portrayed by Saya Iida, Lady C and Yuna Mizumori defeating an unidentified team of three reaper masked "momos" (one of them was later proved to be Thekla). (Note: The reaper-masked characters symbolize unidentified wrestlers announced by Stardom to compete in various events, usually non-canon shows such as the "Showcase" branch, which were usually revealed on the day of the respective shows or kept secret for a longer period of time.) The fifth match saw Giulia, Maika and Himeka going into a no-contest against the time's Artist of Stardom Champions Suzu Suzuki, Risa Sera and Hiragi Kurumi as a result of a hardcore six-woman tag team match. The bout was one of Himeka's wishes before her retirement. In the semi main event, Syuri defeated Saki Kashima in an UWF rules match.

In the main event, Stars (Mayu Iwatani, Hazuki and Koguma) defeated Queen's Quest (Utami Hayashishita, Saya Kamitani and Miyu Amasaki) and Oedo Tai (Natsuko Tora, Starlight Kid and Momo Watanabe to receive local high-quality Kobe beef.

== Results ==
No.	Results	Stipulations	Times
1	Chanyota defeated Saya Iida score (2–1)	Arm wrestling, singles match and muscle posing	5:13
2	AZM defeated Hanan, Momoka Hanazono and Sumire Natsu	Falls count anywhere match	16:32
3	Cosmic Angels (meltear (Tam Nakano and Natsupoi) and Saki) defeated Waka Tsukiyama and Club Venus (Mina Shirakawa and Mariah May)	Captain's fall six-woman elimination tag team match	13:14
4	Super Strong Stardom Machine, Super Strong Stardom Giant Machine and Super Strong Stardom Big Machine defeated Reaper Mask Army (X, X and X)	Six-woman tag team match	11:56
5	Donna Del Mondo (Giulia, Maika and Himeka) vs. Prominence (Suzu Suzuki, Risa Sera and Hiragi Kurumi) ended in a no-contest	Hardcore six-woman tag team match (Note: Himeka announced her retirement from professional wrestling on February 10, 2023. She expressed her wish of facing Suzu Suzuki in a hardcore match as one of her last bouts before retiring.)	12:32
6	Syuri defeated Saki Kashima	UWF rules match	9:23
7	Stars (Mayu Iwatani, Hazuki and Koguma) defeated Queen's Quest (Utami Hayashishita, Saya Kamitani and Miyu Amasaki) and Oedo Tai (Natsuko Tora, Starlight Kid and Momo Watanabe)	Three-way elimination tag team match (Note: Winner team received local high-quality Kobe beef.)	13:56
