= Stardom Mid Summer Champions =

2022 World Wonder Ring Stardom event

- Promotional poster featuring various wrestlers for the July 9 event
- Promotion: World Wonder Ring Stardom
- Date: July 9, 2022
- City: Tokyo, Japan
- Venue: Tachikawa Stage Garden
- Attendance: 1,204

Event chronology
← Previous; New Blood 3	Next → Stardom in Showcase vol.1

Mid Summer Champions chronology
← Previous; First	Next → 2023

Stardom Mid Summer Champions (スターダム真夏のチャンピオン, Sutādamu manatsu no chanpion) was a two-night professional wrestling event promoted by World Wonder Ring Stardom. The events took place on July 9 and 24, 2022, in Tokyo, Japan at the Tachikawa Stage Garden, and in Nagoya, Japan at the Nagoya Congress Center with a limited attendance due in part to the ongoing COVID-19 pandemic at the time.

== Mid Summer Champions in Tokyo ==
Stardom Mid Summer Champions in Tokyo was the first event of the Mid Summer Champions series and took place on July 9, 2022. The event's press conference took place on June 14, 2022 and was broadcast live on Stardom's YouTube channel.

=== Background ===
The show featured eight professional wrestling matches that resulted from scripted storylines, where wrestlers portrayed villains, heroes, or less distinguishable characters in the scripted events that built tension and culminated in a wrestling match or series of matches.

=== Event ===
The two preshow matches were broadcast on Stardom's YouTube channel. In the first one, Lady C picked a victory over Hina and Yuko Sakurai, and in the second one, Hanan successfully defended the Future of Stardom Championship for the eighth time in a row against Waka Tsukiyama. The third match saw Ami Sourei & Mirai defeating Utami Hayashishita & Miyu Amasaki in a tag team match. The fifth match saw AZM successfully defending the High Speed Championship for the fifth time in a row against Momo Kohgo. In the sixth match, Tam Nakano, Unagi Sayaka, Mina Shirakawa, Saki & Hikari Shimizu challenged Giulia, Maika, Himeka, Natsupoi & Mai Sakurai in an elimination tag team match. Natsupoi betrayed Donna Del Mondo by attacking Giulia mid-match, attracting the latter's unit loss. She subsequently joined Cosmic Angels in the process. After Saya Kamitani marked her seventh successful title defense in a row of the Wonder of Stardom Championship over Starlight Kid, Nanae Takahashi returned as a self-proclaimed partner of Kairi. Lady C stepped up on the behalf of Kamitani, establishing a tag team match on further notice.

The main event saw Syuri defeating Momo Watanabe to secure the sixth defense in a row with the World of Stardom Championship. Tam Nakano stepped up to challenge Syuri on further notice, which the God's Eye leader accepted.

=== Results ===
No.	Results	Stipulations	Times
1^{D}	Lady C defeated Hina and Yuko Sakurai	Three-way match	5:31
2^{P}	Hanan (c) defeated Waka Tsukiyama	Singles match for the Future of Stardom Championship	8:23
3	God's Eye (Mirai and Ami Sourei) defeated Queen's Quest (Utami Hayashishita and Miyu Amasaki)	Tag team match	11:58
4	Oedo Tai (Saki Kashima, Ruaka, Rina and Fukigen Death) defeated Stars (Mayu Iwatani, Hazuki, Koguma and Saya Iida)	Eight-woman tag team match	8:42
5	AZM (c) defeated Momo Kohgo	Singles match for the High Speed Championship	10:39
6	Cosmic Angels (Tam Nakano, Unagi Sayaka, Mina Shirakawa, Saki and Hikari Shimizu) defeated Donna Del Mondo (Giulia, Maika, Himeka, Natsupoi and Mai Sakurai)	10-woman elimination tag team match	16:02
7	Saya Kamitani (c) defeated Starlight Kid	Singles match for the Wonder of Stardom Championship	23:35
8	Syuri (c) defeated Momo Watanabe by submission	Singles match for the World of Stardom Championship	20:16
(c) / – the champion(s) heading into the match; D / – this was a dark match; P / – the match was broadcast on the pre-show

== Mid Summer Champions in Nagoya ==
Stardom Mid Summer Champions in Nagoya
- Promotional poster featuring various wrestlers for the July 24 event
- Promotion: World Wonder Ring Stardom
- Date: July 24, 2022
- City: Nagoya, Japan
- Venue: Nagoya Congress Center
- Attendance: 1,064

Event chronology
← Previous; Stardom in Showcase vol.1	Next → 5 Star Grand Prix 2022

Mid Summer Champions chronology
← Previous; First	Next → 2023

Stardom Mid Summer Champions in Nagoya was the second event of the Mid Summer Champions series and took place on July 24, 2022. The event's press conference took place on July 11, 2022 and was broadcast live on Stardom's YouTube channel.

=== Background ===
The show featured eight professional wrestling matches that resulted from scripted storylines, where wrestlers portrayed villains, heroes, or less distinguishable characters in the scripted events that built tension and culminated in a wrestling match or series of matches.

=== Event ===
The first preshow match, in which Hanan and Saya Iida took on Mai Sakurai and Rina Amikura into a 10-minute time limit draw, was broadcast live on Stardom's YouTube channel. In the first main card match, the SWA World Champion Mayu Iwatani and Momo Kohgo picked up a victory over Ruaka and Fukigen Death. The next bout saw AZM defending the High Speed Championship sixth time in a row against Rina. The fourth match portraited the victory of Prominence's Risa Sera, Hiragi Kurumi & Suzu Suzuki in a captain's fall match over Cosmic Angels' Mina Shirakawa, Unagi Sayaka & Hikari Shimizu and Queen's Quest's Lady C, Hina & Miyu Amasaki. Next, Oedo Tai's sub-group of Momo Watanabe, Starlight Kid & Saki Kashima marked their second defense of the Artist of Stardom Championship against Donna Del Mondo's Giulia, Maika & Himeka. The sixth match saw Hazuki and Koguma successfully defending the Goddesses of Stardom Championship fourth time in a row against God's Eye's Ami Sourei and Mirai. In the semi main event, Saya Kamitani defended the Wonder of Stardom Championship successfully for the eighth time against Saki.

The main event portraited the victory of Syuri over Tam Nakano for the World of Stardom Championship, which marked Syuri's seventh defense of the red belt.

=== Results ===
No.	Results	Stipulations	Times
1^{P}	Stars (Hanan and Saya Iida) vs. Mai Sakurai and Rina Amikura ended in a time-limit draw	Tag team match	10:00
2	Stars (Mayu Iwatani and Momo Kohgo) defeated Oedo Tai (Fukigen Death and Ruaka)	Tag team match	4:48
3	AZM (c) defeated Rina	Singles match for the High Speed Championship	8:04
4	Prominence (Risa Sera, Hiragi Kurumi and Suzu Suzuki) defeated Cosmic Angels (Mina Shirakawa, Unagi Sayaka and Hikari Shimizu) and Queen's Quest (Lady C, Hina and Miyu Amasaki)	Three-way tag team match	11:42
5	Oedo Tai (Starlight Kid, Momo Watanabe and Saki Kashima) (c) defeated Donna Del Mondo (Giulia, Maika and Himeka)	Six-woman tag team match for the Artist of Stardom Championship	12:56
6	FWC (Hazuki and Koguma) (c) defeated God's Eye (Ami Sourei and Mirai)	Tag team match for the Goddesses of Stardom Championship	18:45
7	Saya Kamitani (c) defeated Saki	Singles match for the Wonder of Stardom Championship	13:22
8	Syuri (c) defeated Tam Nakano	Singles match for the World of Stardom Championship	22:18
(c) / – the champion(s) heading into the match; P / – the match was broadcast on the pre-show
