= Prominence (professional wrestling) =

Professional wrestling stable

- Stable era logo of the unit (2021–2024)

Tag team
- Members: See below
- Debut: December 1, 2021
- Disbanded: January 12, 2026
- Years active: 2021–2024 (stable); 2024–2026 (tag team); 2026 (stable)

Prominence (プロミネンス, Purominensu) was a villainous professional wrestling stable mainly performing in the Japanese independent scene. The unit was originally led by Risa Sera and also primarily consisted of Suzu Suzuki, Akane Fujita, Mochi Natsumi and Hiragi Kurumi. The stable was known for often producing independent wrestling namesake shows in the Japanese circuit between 2022 and 2024.

The unit reduced to the tag team of Calaminence, consisting of Risa Sera and Saki, from April 2024 until January 2026 when Sera retired from professional wrestling. Since then, Akane Fujita, Mochi Natsumi and Hiragi Kurumi seldomly compete under the stable's banner in various matches.

== History ==
=== Stable era. Formation and departure from Ice Ribbon. (2021) ===
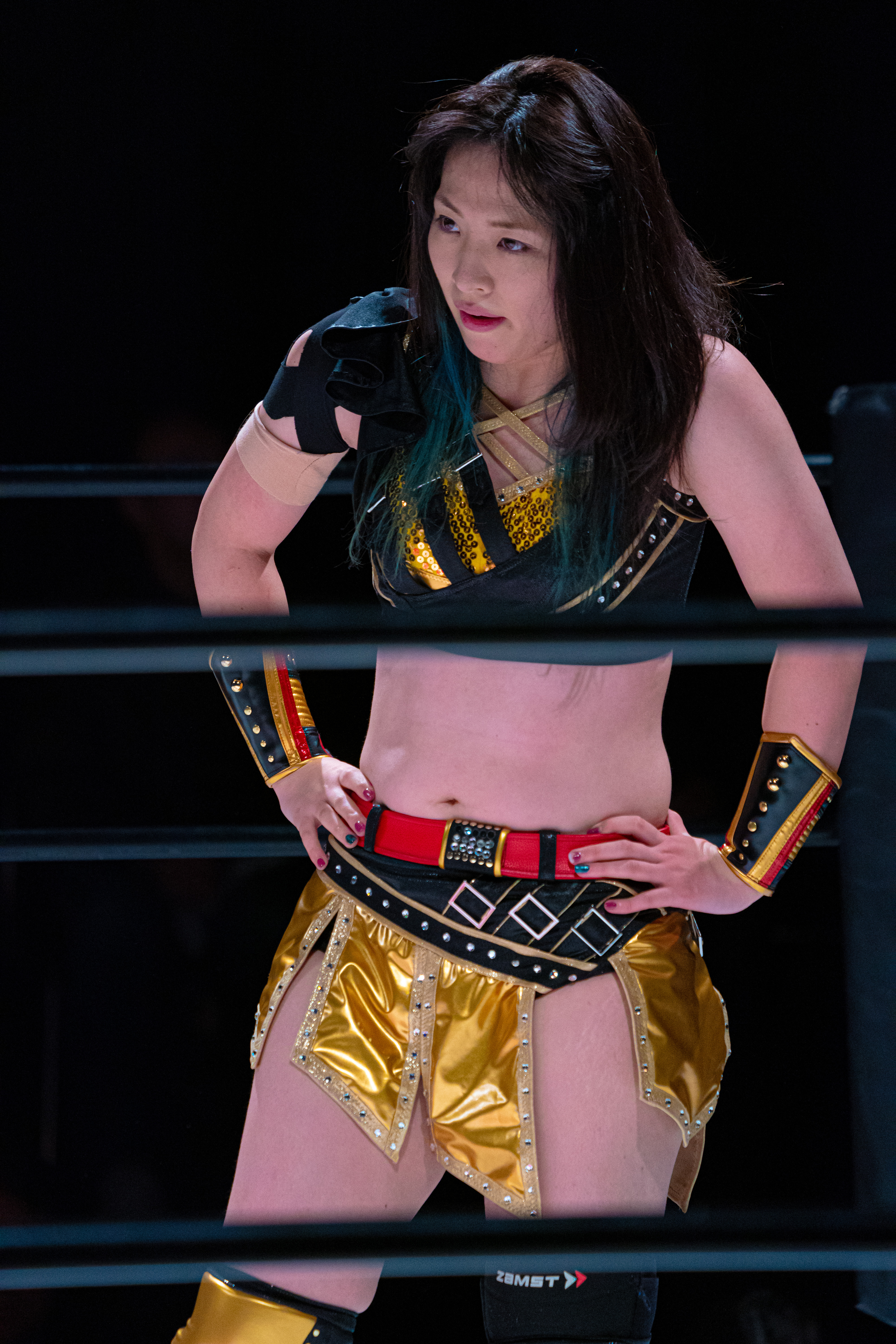
The first leader of the unit, Risa Sera.

On December 1, 2021, it was announced that the current five members of the stable would be leaving Ice Ribbon after they could not agree on the establishment of a new sub-brand with a focus on hardcore matches in contract talks with the officials of the promotion. In a press conference held at short notice by Ice Ribbon on the same day, the five announced not only their exodus but also the founding of their group, under whose banner they also want to organize shows with a focus on death and hardcore wrestling in the future. Despite her contract with Ice Ribbon expiring and after announcing her departure from the company, Akane Fujita defeated Rina Yamashita on December 31, 2021, in a falls count anywhere match at New Ice Ribbon #1168 ~ Ribbonmania 2021 to win the FantastICE Championship, title which she held until even after her departure. Risa Sera also held the International Ribbon Tag Team Championship alongside her long time tag partner of Azure Revolution, Maya Yukihi from August 9 until December 31, when they dropped the titles to Hamuko Hoshi and Ibuki Hoshi at Ribbonmania 2021.

=== Independent circuit (2022–2026) ===
The stable participated in their first independent show on January 4, 2022, at Gake No Fuchi vs. Prominence, where Fujita, Miyagi, Sera and Suzuki teamed up with DDT Pro Wrestling's Sanshiro Takagi to defeat Chris Brookes, Miyako Matsumoto, Mao and Shunma Katsumata. Suzu Suzuki competed in Pro Wrestling Wave's 2022 edition of the Catch the Wave tournament, fighting in the Future Block against Rina Kawahata, Kohaku, Haruka Umesaki and Chie Ozora. Suzuki eventually succeeded in defeating Miyuki Takase in the finals of the tournament, match which was also for the vacant Wave Single Championship.

==== World Wonder Ring Stardom (2022–2024) ====
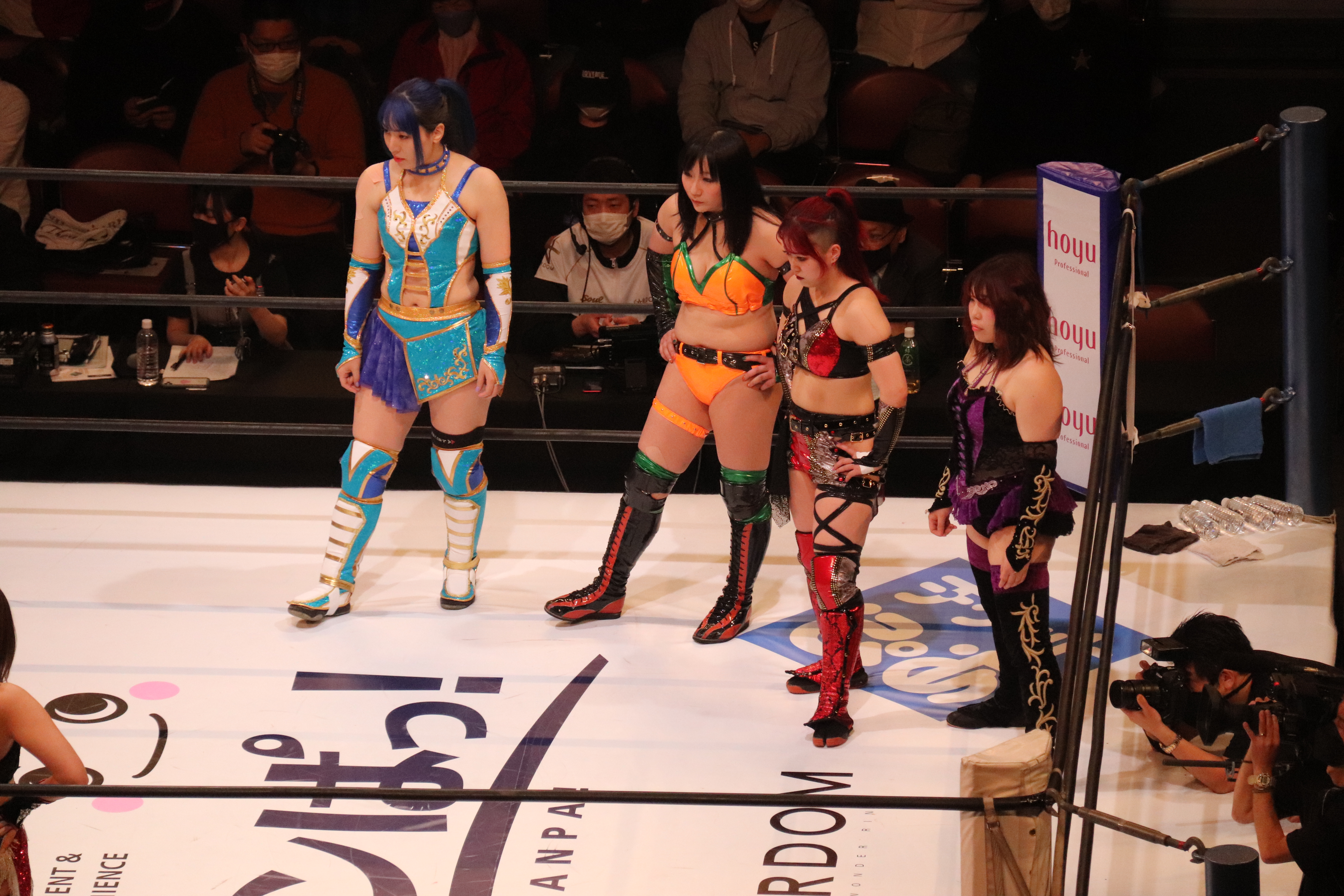
From left to right: Original incarnation members Sera, Fujita, Suzuki and Miyagi at Stardom World Climax 2022 on March 26.

The unit members debuted in World Wonder Ring Stardom on January 29, 2022, at Stardom Nagoya Supreme Fight where they began feuding with Donna Del Mondo's leader Giulia in a feud based on the real-life situation of Giulia's sudden and controversial departure from Ice Ribbon in late 2019. The feud eventually extended to other members of Donna Del Mondo, and on the first night of the Stardom World Climax 2022 on March 26, Sera and Suzuki picked up a victory over Maika and Thekla (Thekla also had history with all Prominence members due to her time in Ice Ribbon). On the second night of the event on March 27, Sera, Suzuki, Fujita & Mochi fell short to Giulia, Himeka, Maika and Thekla in an Eight-woman tag team match. At Stardom New Blood 2 on May 13, 2022, Suzu Suzuki defeated Mai Sakurai and after the match once again verbally sparred with Giulia and also accepted a challenge on behalf of Prominence from the Stardom unit, Cosmic Angels. At Stardom Flashing Champions on May 28, 2022, Suzu Suzuki, Akane Fujita and Mochi Natsumi defeated Unagi Sayaka, Mina Shirakawa and Waka Tsukiyama. In the main event of the pay-per-view, Risa Sera unsuccessfully challenged Syuri for the World of Stardom Championship, concluding a short-term feud between Prominence and God's Eye (the faction Syuri began after leaving DDM). In May, Sera and Suzuki were announced to compete in the Stardom 5 Star Grand Prix 2022 tournament beginning later in the year. At Stardom New Blood 3 on July 8, 2022, Suzu Suzuki went into a time-limit draw against Mirai. During the event, Suzuki and Sera showed that their feud with Donna Del Mondo was not over, as they challenged Giulia and Mai Sakurai for a tag team match on further notice. Hiragi Kurumi also attacked Syuri backstage, hinting that even the war against God's Eye was not over yet. At Stardom in Showcase vol.1 on July 23, 2022, Suzu Suzuki and Risa Sera defeated Giulia and Mai Sakurai in a hardcore tag team match and Hiragi Kurumi fell short to Syuri in an "I quit" match. At Mid Summer Champions in Tokyo, the second event of the Stardom Mid Summer Champions which took place on July 24, 2022, Risa Sera, Hiragi Kurumi and Suzu Suzuki defeated Cosmic Angels (Mina Shirakawa, Unagi Sayaka and Hikari Shimizu) and Queen's Quest (Lady C, Hina and Miyu Amasaki) in a three-way tag team match. At Stardom in Showcase vol.2 on September 25, 2022, Suzu Suzuki defeated Starlight Kid in one of her GP matches. Sera finished the 2022 5 Star Grand Prix with a total of 15 points, same as Suzuki. The latter scored a draw against Giulia on the finals day from October 1, concluding her feud with the Donna Del Mondo leader. At Stardom New Blood 5 on October 19, 2022, Suzu Suzuki teamed up with Ancham to defeat Queen's Quest's Lady C and Hina. At Stardom in Showcase vol.3 on November 26, 2022, Suzu Suzuki, Risa Sera and Hiragi Kurumi defeated Cosmic Angels' Tam Nakano, Natsupoi and Unagi Sayaka. At Stardom Dream Queendom 2 on December 29, 2022, Sera, Suzuki and Kurumi defeated Oedo Tai's Starlight Kid, Momo Watanabe and Saki Kashima to win the Artist of Stardom Championship.

At Stardom Supreme Fight 2023 on February 4, 2023, Suzu Suzuki unsuccessfully challenged Giulia for the World of Stardom Championship. At Stardom All Star Grand Queendom on April 23, 2023, Sera, Suzuki and Kurumi dropped the Artist of Stardom Championship to REstart (Kairi, Natsupoi and Saori Anou).

On April 24, 2023, Suzu Suzuki announced that she would be leaving Prominence, and afterwards appeared on Stardom's April 29 Nagoya show and announced that she will make Stardom her main battlefield. At Stardom 5Star Special in Hiroshima on September 3, 2023, Risa Sera unsuccessfully challenged Giulia for the Strong Women's Championship. At Stardom 5Star Special in Hiroshima on September 3, 2023, Risa Sera unsuccessfully challenged Giulia for the Strong Women's Championship in the main event. The stable's members made their last appearances in Stardom at the 2023 edition of the Goddesses of Stardom Tag League in which Risa Sera and Hiragi Kurumi competed in the Red Block by scoring a total of eight points, failing to qualify for the finals after they went against the teams of Crazy Star (Mei Seira and Suzu Suzuki), XL (Natsuko Tora and Momo Watanabe), Mafia Bella (Giulia and Thekla), Anecon (Syuri and Saki Kashima), Moonlight Venus (Mina Shirakawa and Waka Tsukiyama) and Maximum za Mini (Saya Iida and Hanako).

Sera and Kurumi have had a final sporadic appearance in Stardom as a tag team at a house show from April 21, 2024, where they unsuccessfully challenged Suzu Suzuki and Mei Seira for the Goddesses of Stardom Championship. Sera made her final single appearance at the Stardom 5 Star Grand Prix 2024 where she competed in the Blue Stars B Block, scoring a total of six points, failing to qualify for the quarterfinals.

==== Return to the independent scene. (2023–April 2024) ====
After their collaboration with World Wonder Ring Stardom ended, the stable's members continued to stroll the Japanese independent scene. At a house show promoted by Pure-J on November 23, 2023, Hiragi Kurumi and Mochi Natsumi defeated Ayaka (Ayako Sato and Hanako Nakamori) to win the Daily Sports Women's Tag Team Championship. Sera was announced as a roster member of the overseas joshi promotion of Sukeban, being set to compete under the ring name of "Lady Antoinette". She participated at the inaugural event of Sukeban World Premiere on September 21, 2023, where she teamed up with Commander Nakajima (Arisa Nakajima) as "Dangerous Liaisons" to defeat The Harajuku Stars (Babyface (Ancham) and Maya Mamushi (Maya Yukihi)). The main field of operation for the stable's members remained Pro Wrestling Wave. In early December 2023, Risa Sera formed the tag team of "Calaminence" alongside Saki with whom she has won the Wave Tag Team Championship on three different occasions, first at WAVE PHASE2 Reboot 4th ~ NAMI 1 where they defeated Team Hokakudo (Ikuto Hidaka and Itsuki Aoki) to win the titles.

The last independent show produced by the stable's members to date was the Prominence 23rd Battle ~ Prominence Hataage 2nd Anniversary which took place on April 23, 2024, in which Risa Sera fell short to Takashi Sasaki in a Fluorescent Lighttubes Death Match main event.

=== Downsizing to Calaminence (April 2024–January 2026) ===
Stable members kept to hosting independent shows and were rarely competing under the stable's banner in "unit-style" bouts. The stable entered a standby period which only saw Sera and Saki symbolically keeping half of the unit as "Calaminence" in their tag name. Sera was briefly part of the "Diamond Egoist" stable of Gleat. Alongside stablemate Michiko Miyagi, she unsuccessfully challenged Coelacanths (Cima and Kaz Hayashi) for the G-Infinity Championship at GLEAT House Show In Yokohama on May 4, 2024. Sera also won the Pure-J Openweight Championship on at PURE-J 7th Anniversary on August 11, 2024 by defeating Hanako Nakamori.

== Members ==
*	Founding member
I	Leader

Member		Tenure	Left
Risa Sera	*I (Note: Since she was the senior and most experienced member of the stable, Sera was assumed to be the defacto leader in the stable era of the unit. Sera has also been competing in the main event or co-main event of Prominence events and mainly the important matches at various events featuring her and other members of Prominence. On May 24, 2022 after her death match against Takashi Sasaki, Sera confirmed she is the leader of Prominence. Her role reduced to a tag team member since April 23, 2024.)	December 1, 2021	January 12, 2026
Akane Fujita	*	December 1, 2021	January 12, 2026
Mochi Miyagi	*	December 1, 2021	January 12, 2026
Hiragi Kurumi	*	December 1, 2021	January 12, 2026
Suzu Suzuki	*	December 1, 2021	April 24, 2023
Saki (Note: Saki turned as an official member of the unit since April 23, 2024, during the third reign of the Wave Tag Team Championship alongside Risa Sera.)		April 23, 2024	January 12, 2026

== Sub-groups ==
=== Affiliations and sub-teams ===
Affiliate	Members	Tenure	Type	Notes
Azure Revolution	Risa Sera; Maya Yukihi	2021	Tag team	(Note: Yukihi was not part of the stable when holding the Ice Ribbon tag titles with Sera.)
Unstoppable	Hiragi Kurumi; Mochi Natsumi	2022–present	Tag team	
Diamond Egoist	Risa Sera; Michiko Miyagi; Aoi; Janai Kai	2023	Stable	(Note: Risa briefly took part of the Gleat native stable during 2023.)
Calaminence	Risa Sera; Saki	2023–2026	Tag team	(Note: Sera and Saki competed as a tag team in the Japanese independent scene. Their team name directly derived from Prominence's stable name. Saki officially joined the unit on April 23, 2024 and left on January 12, 2026, with Sera's retirement.)

== Championships and accomplishments ==
*Noted underneath are the accomplishments of the unit's members being recognized since December 1, 2021.

- EXIT Pro Wrestling Underground
  - WUW World Underground Wrestling Women's Championship (1 time) – Akane Fujita
- Ice Ribbon
  - FantastICE Championship (1 time) – Fujita
  - International Ribbon Tag Team Championship (1 time) – Sera with Maya Yukihi
- Pro Wrestling Illustrated
  - Ranked Suzu Suzuki No. 41 of the top 150 female singles wrestlers in the PWI Women's 150 in 2022
  - Ranked Sera No. 59 of the top 150 female singles wrestlers in the PWI Women's 150 in 2022
- Pro Wrestling Wave
  - Wave Single Championship (1 time) – Suzuki
  - Wave Tag Team Championship (4 times) – Sera and Saki (3), Kurumi and Natsumi (1)
  - Catch the Wave (2022) – Suzuki
- Pure-J
  - Daily Sports Women's Tag Team Championship (1 time) – Kurumi and Natsumi
- World Wonder Ring Stardom
  - Artist of Stardom Championship (1 time) – Hiragi Kurumi, Sera and Suzuki
  - Triangle Derby (2023) – Kurumi, Sera and Suzuki
  - 5★Star GP Award
    - 5★Star GP Best Match Award (2022) – Saya Kamitani vs. Suzuki on September 11
