= Stardom in Showcase vol.2 =

2022 World Wonder Ring Stardom event

Stardom in Showcase vol. 2
- Promotional poster of the event series
- Promotion: World Wonder Ring Stardom
- Date: September 25, 2022
- City: Tokyo, Japan
- Venue: Belle Salle Takadanobaba
- Attendance: 759

Event chronology
← Previous; New Blood 4	Next → New Blood 5

Stardom in Showcase chronology
← Previous vol.1	Next → vol.3

Stardom in Showcase vol.2 (ショーケースのスターダムvol.1, Shōkēsu no sutādamu vol. 2) was a professional wrestling event promoted by World Wonder Ring Stardom. It was the second Stardom in Showcase and took place on September 25, 2022, in Tokyo at the Belle Salle Takadanobaba with a limited attendance due in part to the ongoing COVID-19 pandemic at the time.

Six matches were contested at the event, including one on the pre-show. The main event saw the Grim Reaper Army (Nanae Takahashi, Yuna Manase and Yuu) defeat the Rossy Ogawa Bodyguard Army (Syuri and Queen's Quest (Lady C and Utami Hayashishita)) in a Captain's Fall match.

== Production ==
=== Background ===
The Stardom in Showcase is a series of pay-per-views which mainly focuses on a diversity of gimmick matches, only different from the singles match stipulation. Billed as respiro shows, the main tagline of these events is "Anything can happen".

The show featured six professional wrestling matches that resulted from scripted storylines, where wrestlers portrayed villains, heroes, or less distinguishable characters in the scripted events that built tension and culminated in a wrestling match or series of matches.

=== Event ===
The first match presented Hanan defeating Saya Iida in one of the Stardom 5 Star Grand Prix 2022 league matches in which the Future of Stardom Champion picked up a win over her Stars stablemate to score her second win in the tournament. The match was in the preshow and was broadcast live on Stardom's YouTube channel. DJ Pretty Dragon was presented to be the night's music player and Saya Kamitani who main evented the previous Showcase event joined the commentary table. The second match of the night saw Prominence's Suzu Suzuki picking a victory over Starlight Kid in another 5 Star Grand Prix match, granting Suzuki another two points in the Blue Block. After the second match, Saya Iida won a posing contest between herself, Thekla, Momo Kohgo, Syuri, Mirai, Hazuki, Waka Tsukiyama, and Giulia. In the third match, Ram Kaicho defeated the High Speed Champion AZM, the SWA World Champion Mayu Iwatani, and Maika in a four-way falls count anywhere match. The bout was one of the comedic confrontations of the event, taking place mainly outside of the ring, on the venue's staircase, or inside an inflatable doll. Various items were used, such as a bicycle ridden by Maika on the aisle. The fourth bout was the second comedic match of the night, where the members of the Cosmic Angels stable had their usual cosmic rule confrontation. The match saw the wrestlers competing summarily dressed and using various items such as water guns. The match ended in disqualification by referee Daichi Murayama after Unagi Sayaka collected all of her opponents' bras. Unagi then tries to take referee Daichi Murayama’s shirt off. Everyone else declared the winners. The fifth match saw Donna Del Mondo's leader Giulia teaming up with the time's GCW Ultraviolent Champion Rina Yamashita in a hardcore tag team match where they defeated Momo Watanabe & Ruaka. Various items such as roof tiles, chairs, ladders, a guitar, and a table impaled by cut metal cans were used.

The main event saw Yuu & Nanae Takahashi alongside Yuna Manase who were the two reaper masks defeating Syuri, Utami Hayashishita & Lady C. Takahashi & Yuu confirmed their team for the 2022 edition of the Goddesses of Stardom Tag League. Minutes later, a video of Alpha Female is played, along with Nanae Takahashi and criticizing the current situation in Stardom. Together with Takahashi, Manase & Yuu, Alpha Female officially formed the "Neo Stardom Army" unit and declared the destruction over Stardom's roster.

== Results ==
No.	Results	Stipulations	Times
1^{P}	Hanan defeated Saya Iida	5 Star Grand Prix tournament match	6:29
2	Suzu Suzuki defeated Starlight Kid	5 Star Grand Prix tournament match	14:11
3	AZM, Mayu Iwatani and Ram Kaicho defeated Maika	Falls Count Anywhere four-way match	18:13
4	Color's (Hikari Shimizu and Saki) and meltear (Natsupoi and Tam Nakano) defeated Pink Kabuki (Mina Shirakawa and Unagi Sayaka) by disqualification	Cosmic Rule three-way match	13:49
5	Giulia and Rina Yamashita defeated Oedo Tai (Momo Watanabe and Ruaka)	Hardcore Rules tag team match	18:23
6	Grim Reaper Army (Nanae Takahashi, Yuna Manase and Yuu) (Note: Manase and Takahashi were the two reaper masked silhouettes.) defeated Rossy Ogawa Bodyguard Army (Syuri and Queen's Quest (Lady C and Utami Hayashishita)) (with Rossy Ogawa)	Captain's Fall match	22:34
P / – the match was broadcast on the pre-show
