= Stardom in Showcase vol.1 =

2022 World Wonder Ring Stardom event

Stardom in Showcase vol. 1
- Promotional poster
- Promotion: World Wonder Ring Stardom
- Date: July 23, 2022
- City: Nagoya, Japan
- Venue: Nagoya Congress Center
- Attendance: 845

Event chronology
← Previous; Mid Summer Champions in Tokyo	Next → Mid Summer Champions in Nagoya

Stardom in Showcase chronology
← Previous; First	Next → vol.2

Stardom in Showcase vol.1 (ショーケースのスターダムvol.1, Shōkēsu no sutādamu vol. 1) was a professional wrestling event promoted by World Wonder Ring Stardom. It was the inaugural Stardom in Showcase and took place on July 23, 2022, in Nagoya at the Nagoya Congress Center, with a limited attendance due in part to the ongoing COVID-19 pandemic at the time.

Seven matches were contested at the event, including one on the pre-show. The main event saw Sendai Girls' Pro Wrestling's Yuu (dressed as a reaper), make her Stardom debut by defeating Saya Kamitani and Starlight Kid in a three-way casket match.

== Production ==
=== Storylines ===
The Stardom in Showcase is a series of pay-per-views which mainly focuses on a diversity of gimmick matches, only different from the singles match stipulation. Billed as respiro shows, the main tagline of these events is "Anything can happen".

The show featured seven professional wrestling matches that resulted from scripted storylines, where wrestlers portrayed villains, heroes, or less distinguishable characters in the scripted events that built tension and culminated in a wrestling match or series of matches. The preshow matches were broadcast live on Stardom's YouTube channel.

=== Event ===
Dubbed as a non-canon event, the show started with the rumble match in which the two mystery competitors were represented by Stardom Super Strong Machine, impersonated by Saya Iida and Kaori Yoneyama who returned with her old Stars gimmick of Gokigen Death. She won the rumble by last eliminating Miyu Amasaki. In the second match, Maika & Himeka won after Maika threw Saya Iida over the top rope. The third match saw the Cosmic Angels members Unagi Sayaka, Mina Shirakawa, and Saki clash in a three-way "Cosmic rules" match. Referee Daichi Murayama declared the bout a no contest after Sayaka stripped Shirakawa off her swimwear. The next match saw the World of Stardom Champion and God's Eye leader Syuri defeating Hiragi Kurumi in an "I quit match", concluding an individual feud between the two, initiated by Kurumi weeks before the event. The next bout saw the High Speed Champion AZM, Tam Nakano, half of the Goddesses of Stardom Champions Koguma, and one-third of the Artist of Stardom Champions Momo Watanabe clashing into a four-way falls count anywhere match. The confrontation was more comedic, with different items such as an inflatable dummy, a slide, and various other things being used. At a point in the match, Koguma and Nakano even switched ring attires. AZM won the match after driving Koguma into the titantron.

The main event portraited the confrontation of the Wonder of Stardom Champion Saya Kamitani, Starlight Kid, and a "reaper masked" silhouette in a casket match. The mysterious character was revealed to be Yuu from Sendai Girls' Pro Wrestling. She won the match by putting both Kamitani and Kid inside the casket. After the show went off, Stardom posted on Twitter a video of Rossy Ogawa raising from the casket and asking the reaper figure whether they will come back to the promotion or not.

== Results ==
No.	Results	Stipulations	Times
1^{P}	Gokigen Death won by last eliminating Miyu Amasaki	Nagoya rumble match	23:35
2	Donna Del Mondo (Maika and Himeka) defeated Saya Iida and Ami Sourei	Tag team match	6:54
3	Unagi Sayaka vs. Saki vs. Mina Shirakawa ended in a no contest	Cosmic rules three-way match	9:46
4	Syuri defeated Hiragi Kurumi	"I Quit" match	11:21
5	AZM defeated Momo Watanabe, Tam Nakano and Koguma	Four-way falls count anywhere match	15:53
6	Prominence (Suzu Suzuki and Risa Sera) defeated Donna Del Mondo (Giulia and Mai Sakurai)	Hardcore tag team match	20:03
7	Yuu (Note: Yuu was revealed as the "reaper masked" figure who kept attacking Kamitani, Kid, and Stardom president Rossy Ogawa for weeks before the event.) defeated Saya Kamitani and Starlight Kid	Three-way casket match	13:07
P / – the match was broadcast on the pre-show

=== Rumble match entrances and eliminations ===
Draw	Entrant	Order elim.	Eliminated by	Elimination(s)
1	Mayu Iwatani	7	Mirai	1
2	Super Strong Stardom Machine	2	Hazuki, Hanan & Mayu Iwatani	1
3	Hazuki	4	Saki Kashima	1
4	Momo Kohgo	9	Mirai	0
5	Saki Kashima	8	Mirai	3
6	Rina	5	Saki Kashima	0
7	Hina	1	Super Strong Stardom Machine	0
8	Hanan	3	Ruaka	0
9	Ruaka	6	Saki Kashima	1
10	Lady C	11	Miyu Amasaki	1
11	Miyu Amasaki	12	Gokigen Death	1
12	Mirai	10	Lady C	3
13	Gokigen Death	—	Winner	1
