= Yuna Manase =

Japanese professional wrestler (born 1987)

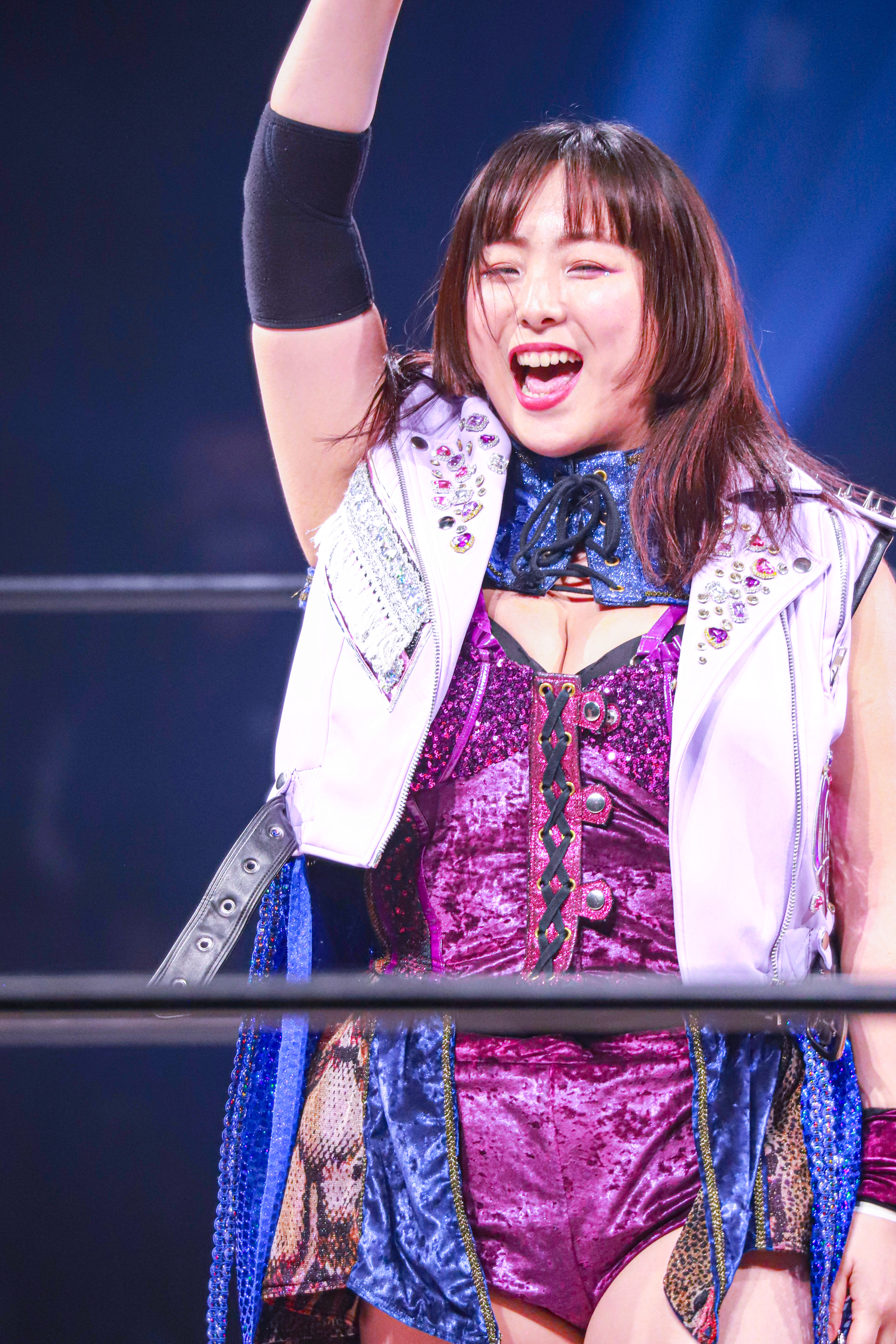
- Manase in January 2023

Personal information
- Born: November 11, 1987 (age 38) Chiba, Japan

Professional wrestling career
- Ring name: Yuna Manase
- Billed height: 170 cm (5 ft 7 in)
- Billed weight: 60 kg (132 lb)
- Trained by: Fuka
- Debut: 2014

Yuna Suzuki (鈴木友菜, Suzuki Yūna; born November 11, 1987), better known by her ring name Yuna Manase (まなせゆうな, Manase Yūna), is a Japanese professional wrestler, working as a freelancer and is best known for her tenure with the Japanese promotion Tokyo Joshi Pro Wrestling. She also works as a coach and trained various wrestlers such as Natsumi Maki, Tam Nakano and Saori Anou.

== Professional wrestling career ==
=== Independent circuit (2014–present) ===
Suzuki is known for briefly competing in various promotions. At CyberFight Festival 2021, an event promoted by CyberFight for its four brands, DDT Pro-Wrestling, Pro Wrestling Noah, Tokyo Joshi Pro Wrestling and Ganbare☆Pro-Wrestling on July 6, 2021, Suzuki participated in a 15-person rumble rules match also involving Antonio Honda, Muhammad Yone, Shuhei Taniguchi, Yoshiaki Yatsu and others.

==== DDT Pro Wrestling (2017–present) ====
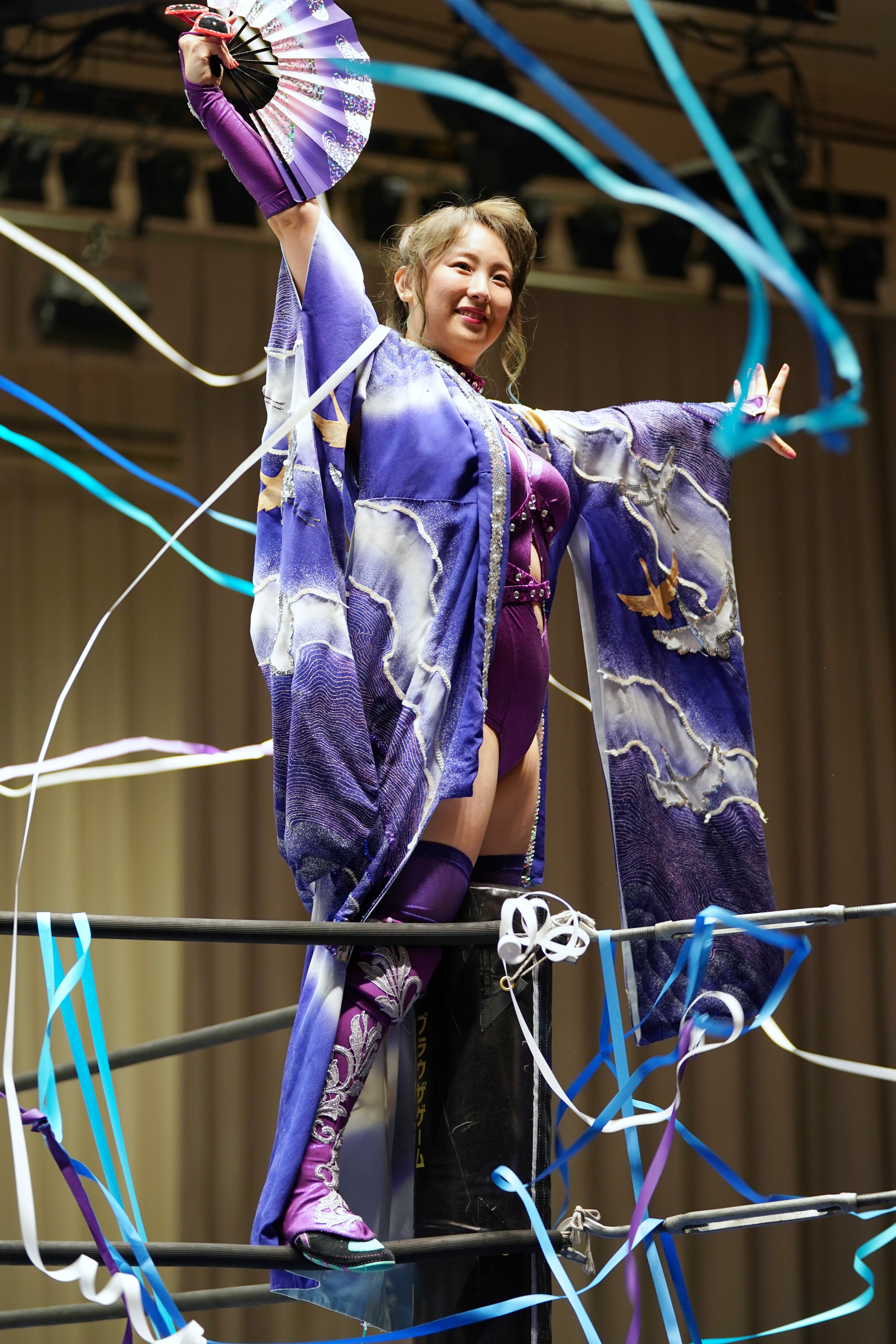
Manase in August 2017

Suzuki usually works for the Ganbare☆Pro-Wrestling branch of DDT, but made appearances in the signature events of the promotions such as the DDT Peter Pan.

At Ryōgoku Peter Pan 2017 on August 20, she participated in a Rumble rules match for the Ironman Heavymetalweight Championship also involving Cherry, Yuu, Shoko Nakajima, Yuka Sakazaki and others. She made another appearance at Wrestle Peter Pan 2019 from July 15 during the relationship between DDT and Tokyo Joshi Pro Wrestling, event where she teamed up with Natsumi Maki and Himawari Unagi in a losing effort to Rika Tatsumi and The Bakuretsu Sisters (Nodoka Tenma and Yuki Aino).

Another notable event where she competed is the DDT Ultimate Party. At Ultimate Party 2019 on November 3, she teamed up with Super Sasadango Machine, Jiro "Ikemen" Kuroshio, Hiroshi Yamato and Makoto Oishi falling short to Danshoku Dino, Asuka, Yuki Iino, Mizuki and Trans-Am★Hiroshi in a Ten-person tag team match for the KO-D 10-Man Tag Team Championship.

At DDT Ganbare Pro Battle Runner on January 17, 2021, she teamed up with Kuuga and Yumehito Imanari to unsuccessfully challenge The Halfee (Katsuzaki Shunosuke, Moehiko Harumisawa and Shu Sakurai) for the GWC 6-Man Tag Team Championship.

==== Tokyo Joshi Pro Wrestling (2017–2022) ====
Suzuki's most notable work of her career took place in Tokyo Joshi Pro Wrestling. After resigning from Actwres girl'Z, she made her debut in the promotion on March 12, 2017, at TJPW At This Time, Get Excited In Nerima! where she picked up a victory over Nodoka-Oneesan. At TJPW If You Get Lost You Just Go To Shin-Kiba! on February 18, 2018, she unsuccessfully challenged Miyu Yamashita for the Princess of Princess Championship. On November 4, 2018, at TJPW 5th Anniversary, Suzuki competed in a 12-woman gauntlet battel royal for the Ironman Heavymetalweight Championship and for the no.1 contendership for the Princess of Princess Championship won by Maki Itoh and also involving Miuzuki, Reika Saiki, Shoko Nakajima and others. Her most notable victory took place at TJPW KFC 2Days '19 ~Desert Moon~ on September 16, 2019, where she defeated her own student Natsumi Maki for the International Princess Championship.

==== (2014–2015) ====
Suzuki made her professional wrestling debut at World Wonder Ring Stardom's Season 15 New Year Stars 2014 event from January 12, where she fell short to Kairi Hojo. She continued making sporadic appearances, such as on the second night of the Stardom Grow Up Stars 2014 on March 30, where she competed in a 14-woman battle royal also involving Mayu Iwatani, Nanae Takahashi, Act Yasukawa, Alpha Female, Io Shirai, Natsuki Taiyo and others. Suzuki resigned from the promotion on March 8, 2015, to start working for other companies.

==== (2021–2022) ====
At Stardom's 10th Anniversary on March 3, 2021, Suzuki made a one-time return, participating in a 24-women Stardom All Star Rumble featuring wrestlers from the promotion's past such as Chigusa Nagayo, Kyoko Inoue, Mima Shimoda, Hiroyo Matsumoto, Emi Sakura, Yuzuki Aikawa, Yoko Bito and others. At Stardom in Showcase vol.2 on September 25, 2022, Manase worked into a non-canon storyline where she and Nanae Takahashi teamed up as two masked reapers with Yuu and defeated Syuri, and Queen's Quest's Utami Hayashishita and Lady C who were billed as Rossy Ogawa's "Bodyguard Army". After the pay-per-view came to an end, Alpha Female reached out via taped video in which she teased the formation of the Neo Stardom Army unit alongside Takahashi, Yuu and Manase.

== Championships and accomplishments ==
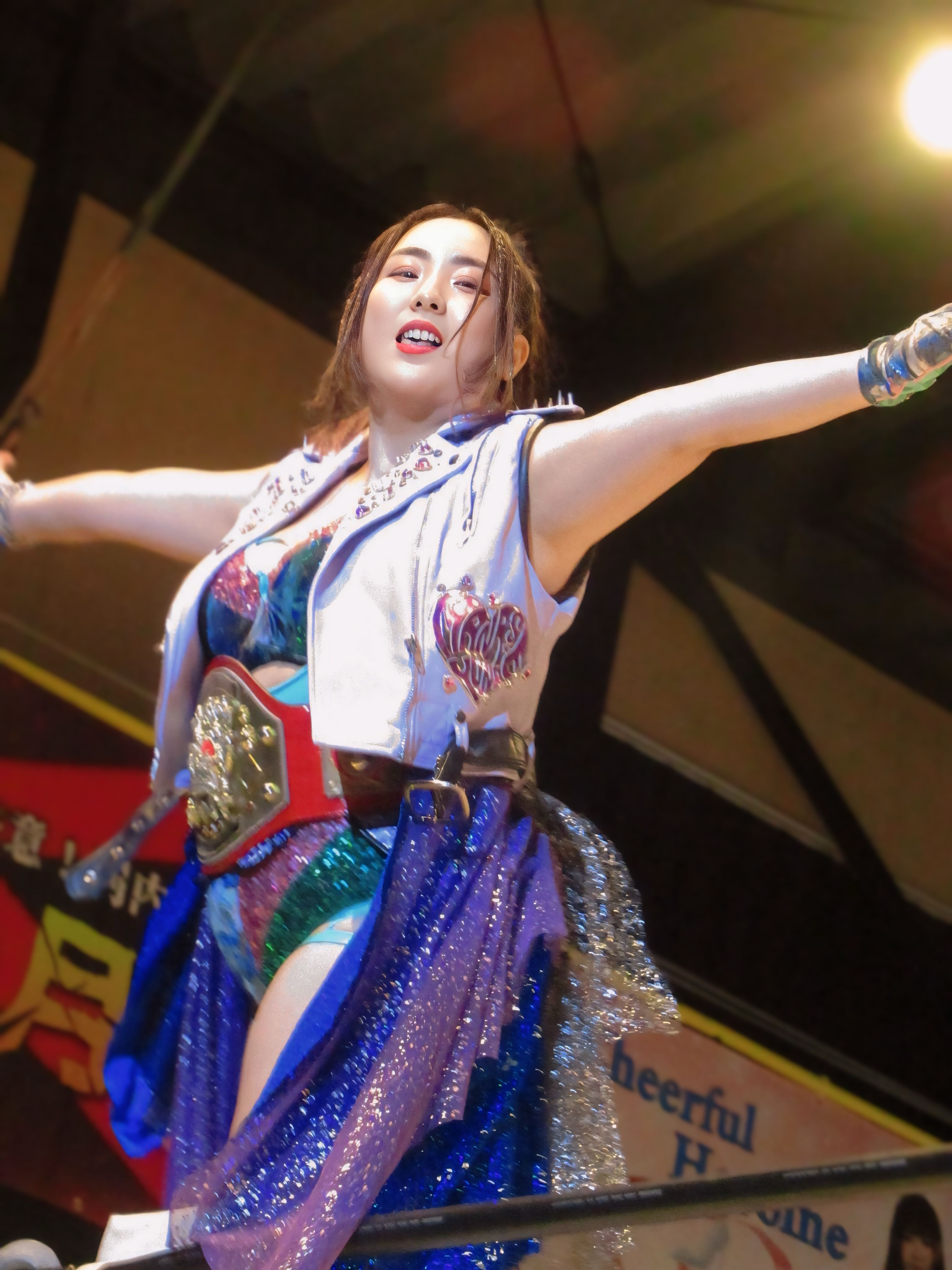
In Ice Ribbon, Manase is a two-time International Ribbon Tag Team Champion.

- DDT Pro-Wrestling
  - Ironman Heavymetalweight Championship (2 time)
- Ice Ribbon
  - International Ribbon Tag Team Championship (2 times) – with Totoro Satsuki
- Kitsune Women's Wrestling
  - Kitsune World Championship (1 time, final)
- Pro Wrestling Illustrated
  - Ranked No. 215 of the top 250 female wrestlers in the PWI Women's 250 in 2024
- Pure-J
  - Daily Sports Women's Tag Team Championship (1 time) – with Moeka Haruhi
- Tokyo Joshi Pro Wrestling
  - International Princess Championship (1 time)
