= FantastICE Championship =

Professional wrestling women's championship

Details
- Promotion: Ice Ribbon
- Date established: August 9, 2020
- Current champion: Tsukina Umino
- Date won: December 31, 2025
Statistics
- First champion: Risa Sera
- Longest reign: Akane Fujita (1,461 days)
- Shortest reign: Rina Yamashita (187 days)
- Oldest champion: Akane Fujita (34 years, 362 days)
- Youngest champion: Risa Sera (28 years, 264 days)
- Heaviest champion: Rina Yamashita (77 kg (170 lb))
- Lightest champion: Tsukina Umino (50 kg (110 lb))

The FantastICE Championship is a women's professional wrestling championship created and promoted by the Japanese promotion Ice Ribbon. The current champion is Tsukina Umino.

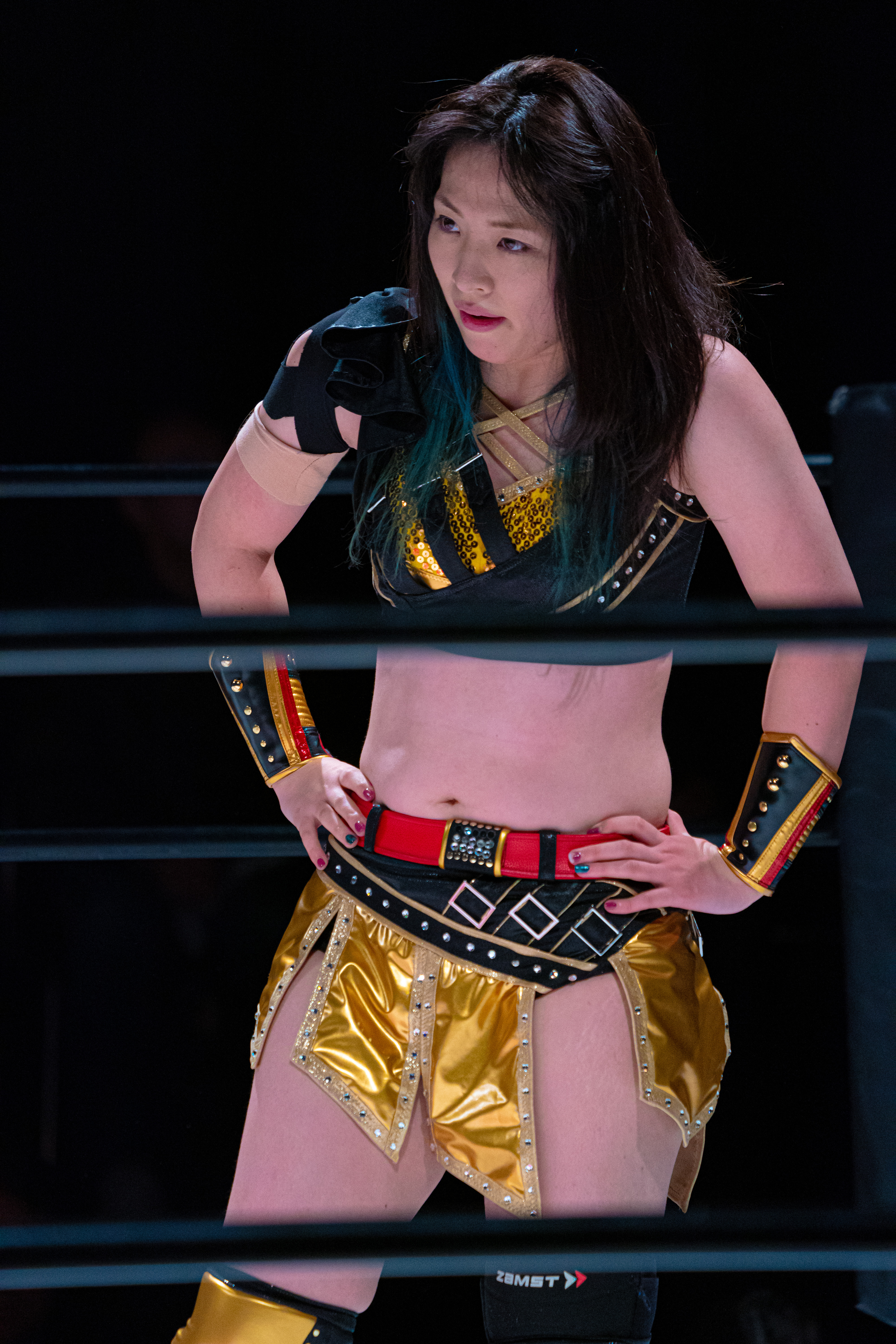
Inaugural champion Risa Sera

== Title history ==
As of 10 February 2026, there have been a total of four reigns shared between four different champions. Risa Sera was the inaugural champion. Sera's reign is also the longest at 322 days, while Rina Yamashita reign is the shortest at 187 days. Akane Fujita is the oldest champion when she won it at 35 years old while Sera is also the youngest champion at 28 years old.

The current champion is Tsukina Umino, who won the title by defeating Akane Fujita on the December 31, 2025 episode of New Ice Ribbon: Ribbonmania in Tokyo, Japan.

Key
No.	Overall reign number
Reign	Reign number for the specific champion
Days	Number of days held
Defenses	Number of successful defenses
+	Current reign is changing daily

No.	Champion	Championship change			Reign statistics			Notes	Ref.
No.	Champion	Date	Event	Location	Reign	Days	Defenses	Notes	Ref.
1	Risa Sera	August 9, 2020	Yokohama Bunka Gymnasium Final	Yokohama, Kanagawa	1	322	10	Sera defeated Rina Yamashita to become the inaugural champion.	
2	Rina Yamashita	June 27, 2021	New Ice Ribbon #1129 ~ After The Rain, Ribbon ~ Goodbye Our Matsuya Uno	Tokyo, Japan	1	187	2	This was a Fluorescent Light Tube Death Match.	
3	Akane Fujita	December 31, 2021	New Ice Ribbon: Ribbonmania	Tokyo, Japan	1	1,461	5	This was a falls count anywhere match.	
4	Tsukina Umino	December 31, 2025	New Ice Ribbon: Ribbonmania	Tokyo, Japan	1	326+	3		

== Combined reigns ==
As of 10 February 2026

†	Indicates the current champion

Rank	Wrestler	No. of reigns	Combined defenses	Combined days
1	Akane Fujita	1	5	1,461
2	Tsukina Umino †	1	3	326+
3	Risa Sera	1	10	322
4	Rina Yamashita	1	2	187
