= Risa Sera =

Japanese professional wrestler and actress

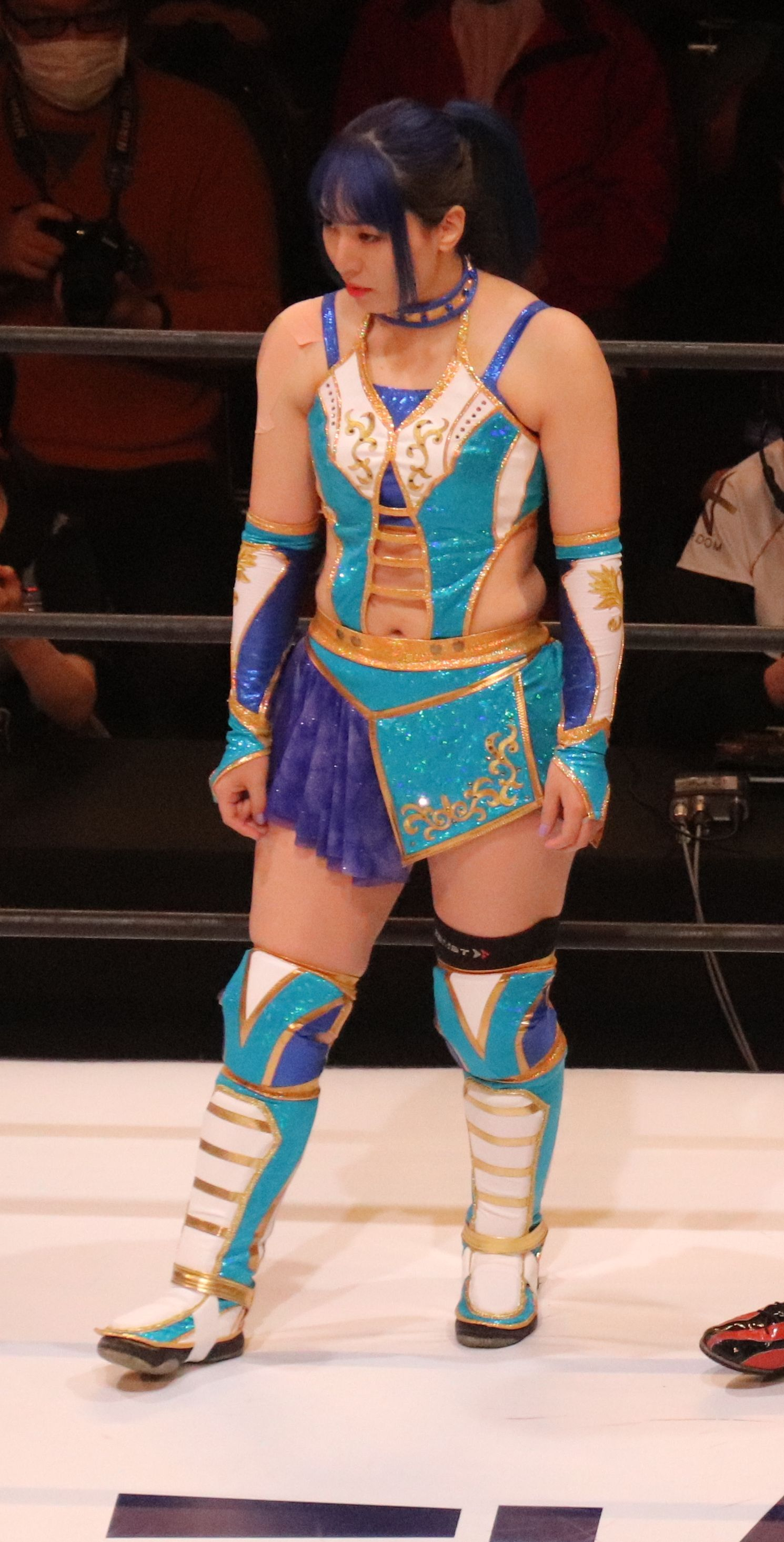
- Sera in March 2022

Personal information
- Born: Risa Okuda; November 19, 1991 (age 34) Sera, Hiroshima
- Spouse: Yoshihisa Uto (m. 2019; div. 2023)

Professional wrestling career
- Ring name(s): Kendo Risa Sera; Lady Antoinette; Risa Okuda; Risa Sera; Serakado
- Billed height: 1.67 m (5 ft 5 1/2 in)
- Billed weight: 60 kg (130 lb)
- Trained by: Tsukasa Fujimoto
- Debut: November 10, 2012
- Retired: January 12, 2026

Risa Okuda (奥田 理紗, Okuda Risa; born November 19, 1991), better known by her ring name Risa Sera (世羅 りさ, Sera Risa), is a Japanese retired professional wrestler and actress, best known for her tenures with various promotions from the Japanese independent scene such as Ice Ribbon where is a four-time International Ribbon Tag Team Champion and a two-time ICE×∞ Champion.

== Early life ==
Sera was born in Sera, Hiroshima. After graduating high school, she moved to Tokyo and studied voice acting at Amusement Media Academy (AMG). In 2012, Sera took part in the audition for "Taiyo kara Plancha" (太陽からプランチャ), a movie collaboration with Ice Ribbon, and she won the main role on the condition that she had to actually make her wrestling debut with other winners of the audition, which made Ice Ribbon's recruiting project likewise in "Muscle Venus." Until then, she used her real name Risa Okuda.

== Professional wrestling career ==
=== Ice Ribbon (2012–2026) ===
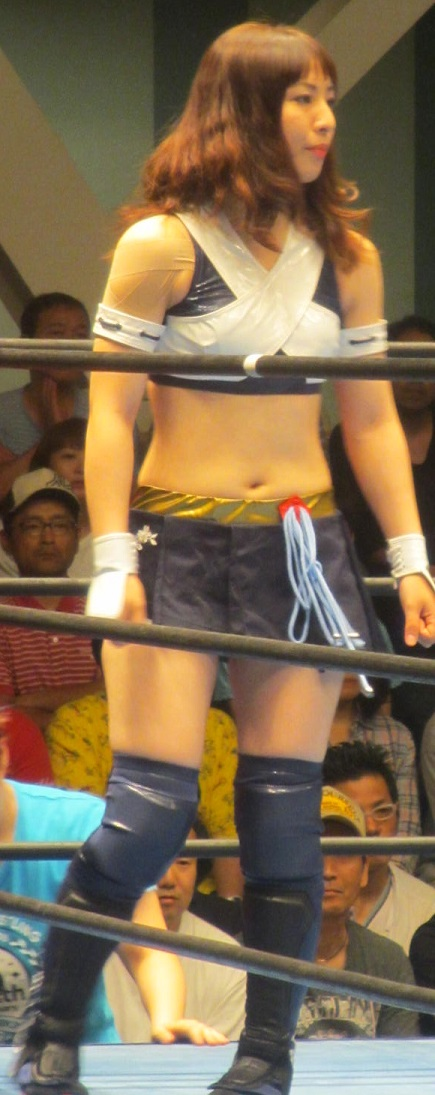
Sera in July 2016

Sera was trained by Tsukasa Fujimoto and made her debut on November 10, 2012, at the Ice Ribbon dojo under the ring name Risa Sera, defeated by Hamuko Hoshi. A half of her co-actors quit wrestling early, but she, 235 and Rutsuko Yamaguchi (retired in 2014 due to knee injury) remained to be on the roster.

On January 4, 2014, Sera teamed up with Maki Narumiya and named their tag team ".STAP". They defeated Tsukushi and Hiragi Kurumi at the Korakuen Hall event on March 30 to become the International Ribbon Tag Team Champions. Until the next year, they successfully retained the championship for nine times. The team was dissolved as Narumiya left Ice Ribbon by March 31, 2015. They were defeated in a hardcore tag match against Isami Kodaka and Yuko Miyamoto in their last match, then Sera challenged Narumiya to a hardcore tag match. They had the match on May 4 and Sera's team were defeated. Sera demanded an even harder rematch with light tubes, but this was declined by management of Ice Ribbon, because it would be deviating from the main concept of the promotion. Sera declared that she would boycott the next Korakuen Hall event on June 24, but eventually she held her own event there after Ice Ribbon's event for just one match called "Human Hair Death Match" (人毛デスマッチ) and made peace with Narumiya after being defeated again.

Since then, Sera held two "Death Match" events collaborating with Ice Ribbon. They were made of fun matches by Ice Ribbon's wrestlers and really hardcore matches including ladders, barbed wires and light tubes by Sera, so practically she made the promotion compromise on the matter.

On November 14, 2015, Sera formed a new tag team with Maya Yukihi, and named the team "Azure Revolution".

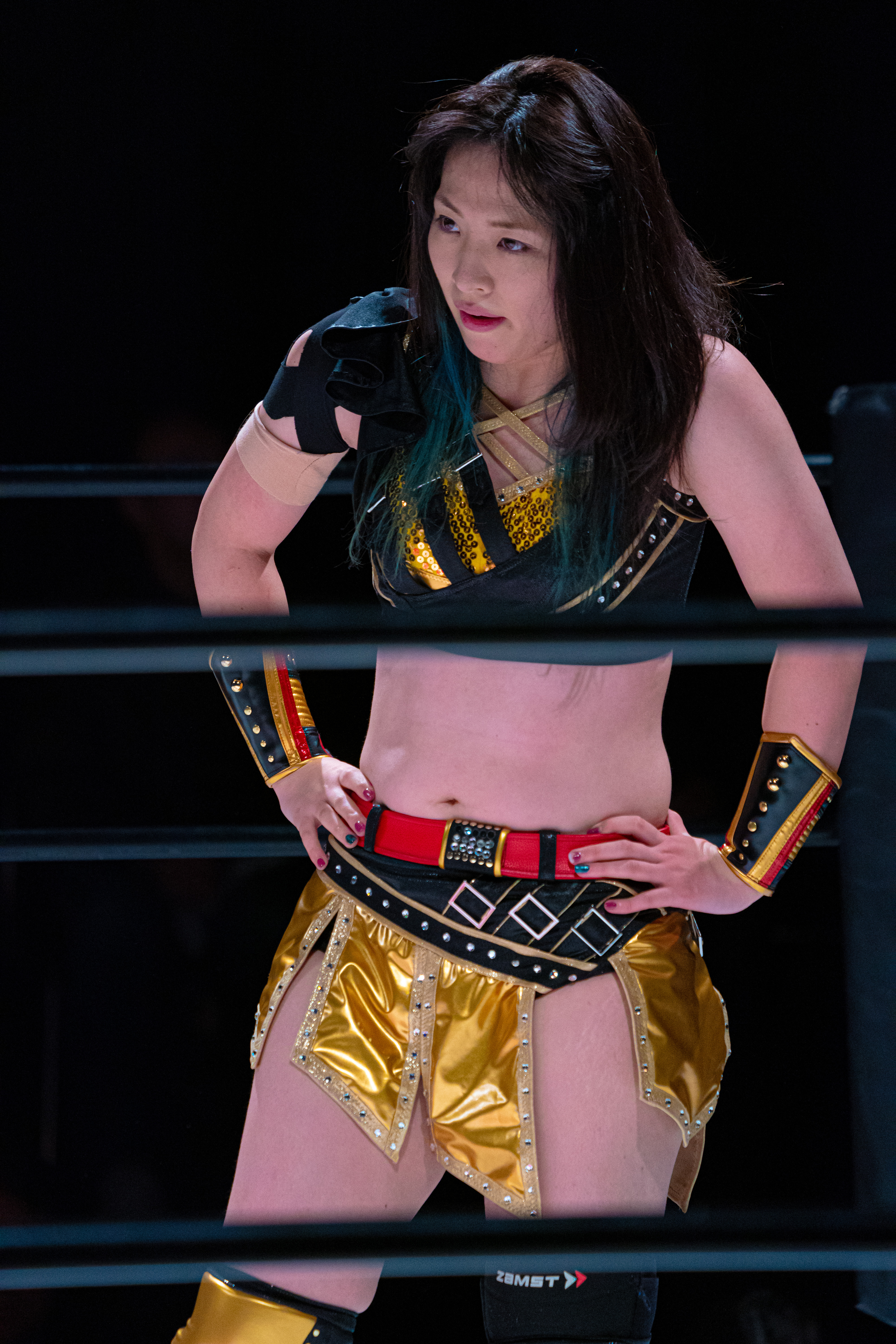
Okuda in January 2020

On March 21, Sera challenged Hamuko Hoshi for the ICE Cross Infinity Championship, and defeated Hoshi by a diving double knee drop to win her first title as a single player. On May 3, Sera headlined Ice Ribbon's 10th anniversary event at Yokohama Cultural Gymnasium to successfully defend the championship against Yuka. Sera was defeated by Tsukasa Fujimoto at korakuen Hall event on July 3 and lost the title, but the title went vacant by the result of the November 3 event, and on December 31, Sera won the tournament for the championship, defeating Fujimoto in the finals, and regained the title. Sera held the title for a full year, losing it to Hiiragi Kurumi in her eighth defense on December 31, 2017. On December 1, 2021, it was announced that Sera, along with Suzu Suzuki, Mochi Miyagi, Akane Fujita, and Kurumi Hiiragi were departing the company to start a freelance deathmatch unit called Prominence.

=== Prominence (2021–2026) ===
Prominence had their first appearance as a unit in Gake no Fuchi's show on January 4, 2022. Following that it was announced that Wrestle Universe would partner with Prominence to stream shows the unit produced.

=== World Wonder Ring Stardom (2022–2026) ===
Sera aligned herself with Suzu Suzuki, Hiragi Kurumi, Akane Fujita and Mochi Miyagi in the Prominence stable at the end of 2021 after their contract with Ice Ribbon expired, leaving them to wander as freelance wrestlers. Sera and the rest of the stable made their first appearance in World Wonder Ring Stardom's first pay-per-view of 2022, the Stardom Nagoya Supreme Fight from January 29 where they picked a fight with the Donna Del Mondo stable. On the first night of the Stardom World Climax 2022 from March 26, Sera teamed up with her Prominence stablemate Suzu Suzuki to defeat Donna Del Mondo's (Maika and Thekla). On the second night of the event from March 27, she teamed up with her stablemates Akane Fujita, Mochi Miyagi and Suzu Suzuki in a losing effort against Donna Del Mondo's team of Giulia, Himeka, Maika & Thekla. At Stardom Flashing Champions on May 28, 2022, Sera unsuccessfully challenged Syuri for the World of Stardom Championship. At Stardom in Showcase vol.1 on July 23, she teamed up with Suzu Suzuki to face Giulia and Mai Sakurai in a hardcore match, winning in a dominant fashion and continuing the Prominence/DDM feud. At Mid Summer Champions in Nagoya, the second event of the Stardom Mid Summer Champions series which took place on July 24, 2022, Sera teamed up with Suzuki and Hiragi Kurumi to defeat Cosmic Angels (Mina Shirakawa, Unagi Sayaka & Hikari Shimizu) and Queen's Quest (Lady C, Hina & Miyu Amasaki). She finished with 15 points in the "Blue Block" of the 2022 Grand Prix after competing against Tam Nakano, Himeka, Maika, AZM, Utami Hayashishita, Koguma, Syuri, Saki Kashima, Saki, Mai Sakurai, Momo Kohgo and Unagi Sayaka. At Stardom Dream Queendom 2 on December 29, 2022, Suzuki teamed up with Suzu Suzuki and Hiragi Kurumi and defeated Oedo Tai (Starlight Kid, Momo Watanabe and Saki Kashima) to win the Artist of Stardom Championship.

At the 2023 edition of the Triangle Derby, Sera will team up with Suzuki and Kurumi and compete in the "Triangle Blue" where they will face the teams of Rebel&Enemy (Ram Kaicho, Maika Ozaki and Maya Yukihi), Lollipop (Waka Tsukiyama, Yuko Sakurai and Rina Amikura), Classmates (Hazuki, Koguma and Saya Iida), MaiHime with C (Maika, Himeka and Lady C), Abarenbo GE (Syuri, Mirai and Ami Sourei), and Oedo Tai (Natsuko Tora, Momo Watanabe and Saki Kashima).

She retired on January 12, 2026.

== Acting career ==
=== Filmography ===
- 2013: Taiyo kara Plancha (太陽からプランチャ, Taiyo kara Purancha)

=== Theatrical Dramas ===
- 2012: Tonari no Obachan (隣のおばちゃん, Tonari no Obachan)
- 2012: Junkissa Setsuna (純喫茶せつな, Junkissa Setsuna)
- 2013: Circus Monogatari (サーカス物語, Saakasu Monogatari)
- 2013: tears
- 2013: Pochi no Shippo ni Maiochiru Yuki (ポチのしっぽに、舞い落ちる雪, Pochi no Shippo ni Maiochiru Yuki)
- 2014: Kearuura Kissaten (けあるぅら喫茶店, Kearuura Kissaten)
- 2015: Soratobu Jitensha (空飛ぶ自転車, Soratobu Jitensha)
- 2016: A.D.〜automatic dream〜

=== Television ===
- 2013: Sekai Ouja Tanjo Project Sekaioh! (世界王者誕生プロジェクト セカイオー!, Sekai Ouja Tanjo Purojekuto Sekaioo!)
- 2013: Zenigata Kintaro (銭形金太郎, Zenigata Kintaro)
- 2014: Hinomaru Challengers (日の丸チャレンジャーズ, Hinomaru Charenjaazu)

== Championships and accomplishments ==
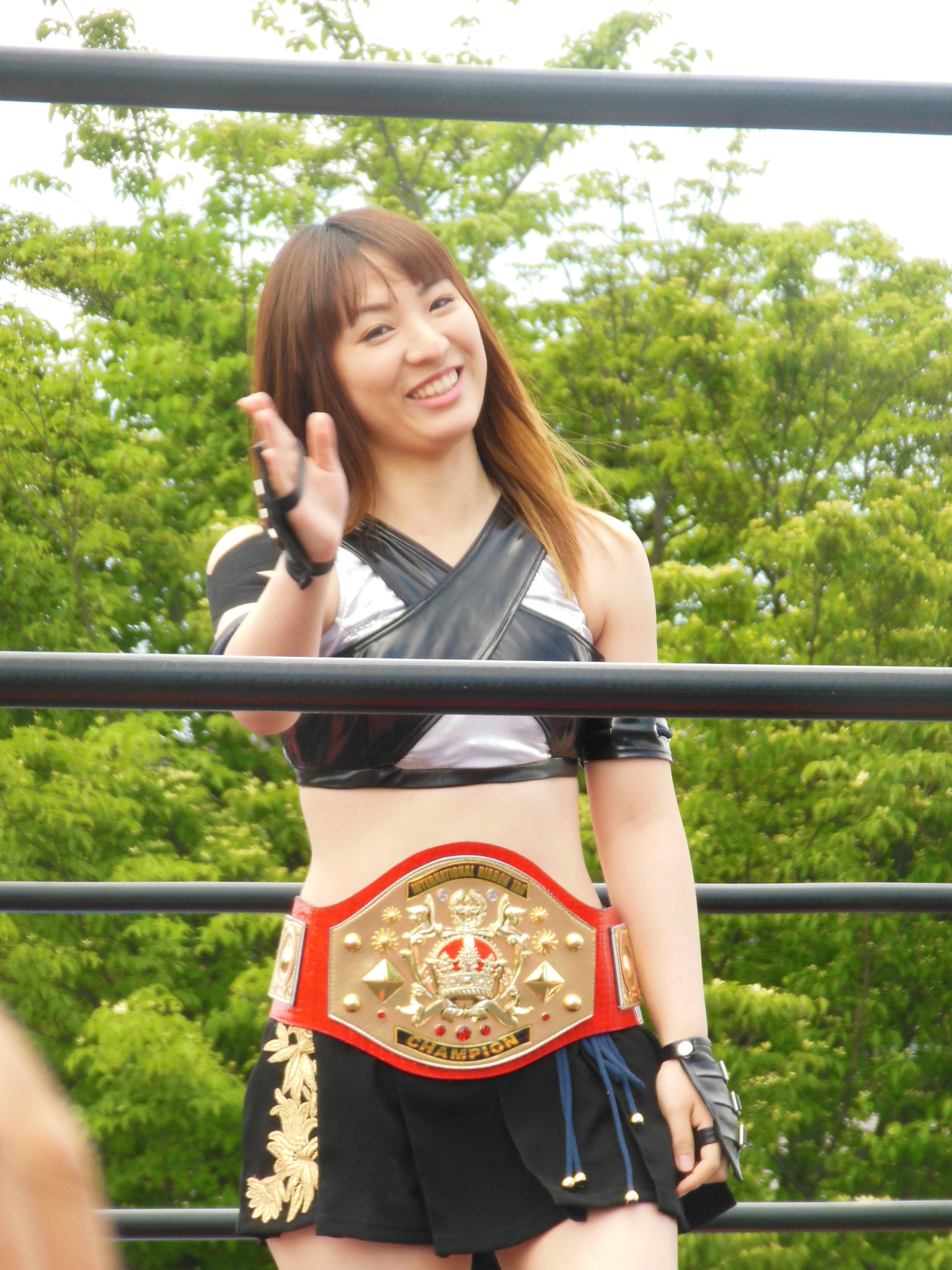
Sera in 2018 as one half of the International Ribbon Tag Team Champions

- Ice Ribbon
  - ICE×∞ Championship (2 times)
  - FantastICE Championship (1 time, inaugural)
  - International Ribbon Tag Team Championship (5 times) – with Maki Narumiya (1) and Maya Yukihi (4)
  - Ice Ribbon Tag Team Championship Tournament (2017) – with Maya Yukihi
  - Next Ribbon Tag Team Championship Challenger Determination Tournament (2014) – with Maki Narumiya
  - Ice Ribbon Year-End Award (3 times)
    - Best Bout Award (2019) vs. Maya Yukihi on September 14
    - Best Tag Team Award (2017) with Maya Yukihi
    - MVP Award (2017)
- Pro Wrestling Illustrated
  - Ranked No. 36 of the top 50 female singles wrestlers in the PWI Female 50 in 2017
- Pro Wrestling Wave
  - Wave Tag Team Championship (3 times) – with Saki
  - Dual Shock Wave (2023) – with Saki
  - Catch the Wave Award (3 times)
    - Best Bout Award (2025) vs. Mio Shirai on May 14, shared with Haruka Umesaki vs. Kaho Kobayashi on July 5
    - Best Performance Award (2023)
    - Special Award (2025) shared with Cherry and Sumire Natsu
- Pro Wrestling Zero1
  - Blast Queen Championship (1 time)
- Pure-J
  - Pure-J Openweight Championship (1 time)
- World Woman Pro-Wrestling Diana
  - World Woman Pro-Wrestling Diana World Championship (1 time)
- World Wonder Ring Stardom
  - Artist of Stardom Championship (1 time) – with Hiragi Kurumi and Suzu Suzuki
  - Triangle Derby I Tournament (2023) – with Hiragi Kurumi and Suzu Suzuki
  - Stardom Year-End Award (1 time)
    - Best Match Award (2014) with Takumi Iroha vs. Kairi Hojo and Nanae Takahashi on December 23
- Young Ribbon Wasshoi!
  - Young Ribbon Mixed Tag Team Championship (1 time) – with Yuko Miyamoto
