= Rossy Ogawa =

Japanese businessman (born 1957)

- ロッシー小川
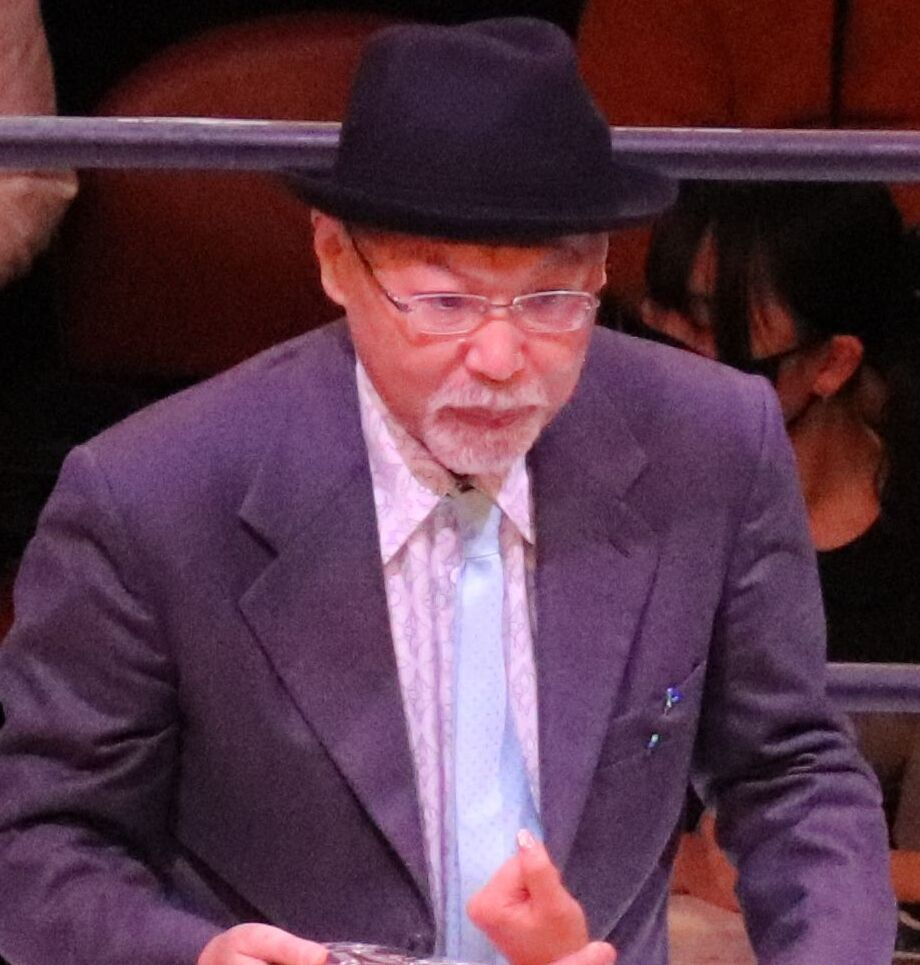
- Ogawa in March 2022
- Born: Hiroshi Ogawa; May 1, 1957 (age 69); Chiba, Japan

Hiroshi Ogawa (小川 宏, Ogawa Hiroshi; born May 1, 1957), better known as Rossy Ogawa (ロッシー小川, Rosshī Ogawa), is a Japanese businessman and professional wrestling promoter. He is the founder and the current head booker of Dream Star Fighting Marigold. He is one of the three founders and former executive producer of the Japanese professional wrestling promotion World Wonder Ring Stardom. Ogawa is often regarded as being instrumental in the modern popularization of women's pro wrestling in Japan.

== Professional wrestling promoter career ==
=== All Japan Women's Pro Wrestling (1978–1997) ===
Before becoming a joshi puroresu promoter, Ogawa started as a ringside photographer for All Japan Women's Pro Wrestling (AJW) in January 1978. After that, Ogawa acted as a spokesperson, the head of public relations and a talent manager for AJW, and eventually became involved with the creative division. He also compiled pieces of the company's history, such as the lineage of the title belts. One of the acts that Ogawa managed was the Crush Gals (Chigusa Nagayo and Lioness Asuka), two of the biggest stars of 1980s AJW. The trio would witness an explosion of Joshi popularity as they were broadcast on Channel 8 of Fuji Television. In 1997, Ogawa left All Japan Women's Pro-Wrestling, following conflicts with the Matsunaga family over the direction of the promotion.

=== Arsion (1997–2003) ===
Ogawa was the president of the Arsion promotion, being one of the major key figures alongside founder Aja Kong, manager Sakie Hasegawa and trainer Mariko Yoshida. In 2001, Aja Kong left Arsion following a disagreement with management over the promotion's direction and subsequently sued Ogawa for falsely advertising her for upcoming events. Kong's departure was followed by Ogawa signing Lioness Asuka as the promotion's new booker. Asuka proceeded to push herself, Etsuko Mita, Mima Shimoda and Gami into major storylines. In 2002, Ayako Hamada quit Arsion over internal politics within the promotion, feeling that she had been blamed for Arsion's recent problems and pushed down the card since Asuka took over the booking. Hamada joined Aja Kong at the Gaea Japan promotion. Arsion finally folded during the summer of 2003, after which Yumiko Hotta took over the promotion and renamed it AtoZ.

=== World Wonder Ring Stardom (2010–2024) ===
Ogawa founded the World Wonder Ring Stardom promotion in September 2010, alongside retired professional wrestler and mixed martial artist Fuka Kakimoto, and All Japan Women veteran professional wrestler Nanae Takahashi. Being Stardom's main booker, Ogawa established the promotion's concept of events in the format of "seasons," with one season lasting, on average, two months. Stardom held its first event, Birth of Nova, on January 23, 2011, in Tokyo's Shin-Kiba 1st Ring, the venue that would frequently host events for the promotion in the following years and was also the location of its earliest training dojo. In time, Ogawa worked to provide Stardom various collaborations with other companies. Many members of the company's roster would be featured in Fire Pro Wrestling World, a video game developed by Spike Chunsoft. This would be Stardom's first involvement with a video game and was released on August 22, 2019. On October 17, 2019, a press conference was held in which the purchase of Stardom by entertainment company, Bushiroad, was announced. Because Bushiroad is also the owner of New Japan Pro-Wrestling, they proceeded in making Stardom their sister promotion in the process, with Ogawa remaining Stardom's head producer. Ogawa handled the effect of the COVID-19 pandemic in Japan over Stardom initially by organizing events with no attendance starting with the one from March 8, 2020, at Korakuen Hall. The company would eventually continue hosting their events as time passed, but with limited attendances.

Ogawa was in a very close relationship with the promotion's roster, as he always used to accompany the wrestlers at press conferences, title match contract signings, or even before and after their bouts, handing the winners their respective championship belts or the trophies (awarded to the champion who retains a title). He always stood at ringside during major pay-per-views.

He even took part in several event storylines along with certain members of the roster. He marked notable appearances in the "Stardom in Showcase" series of events, starting with the first event of its kind from July 23, 2022. He was involved in a non-canon side story where he alongside Starlight Kid and Saya Kamitani was attacked by a masked wrestler who was later revealed to be Yuu, a competitor from out of Stardom against which Kid and Kamitani would fall short in a casket match. At Stardom in Showcase vol.2 on September 25, 2022, Ogawa was still attacked by masked wrestlers and he hired Queen's Quest's Utami Hayashishita, Lady C and God's Eye's Syuri as his personal "Bodyguard Army" to defend him against the masks. However, not even they could keep him safe as Yuu, Nanae Takahashi and Yuna Manase defeated his defense team.

On February 4, 2024, Ogawa's contract was terminated by Stardom's parent Bushiroad due to alleged talent poaching.

=== Dream Star Fighting Marigold (2024–present) ===
On April 15, 2024, Ogawa held a press conference to announce the establishment of the Dream Star Fighting Marigold promotion. The initial roster included former Stardom members Giulia, Utami Hayashishita, Mirai, Mai Sakurai, Yuzuki, Nanae Takahashi, and Ice Ribbon's Nao Ishikawa. The event was also attended by former Actwres girl'Z members Chiaki, Misa Matsui, Miku Aono, Fuka, Natsumi Sumikawa, Kouki and Chika Goto.
