= Himeka Arita =

Japanese professional wrestler

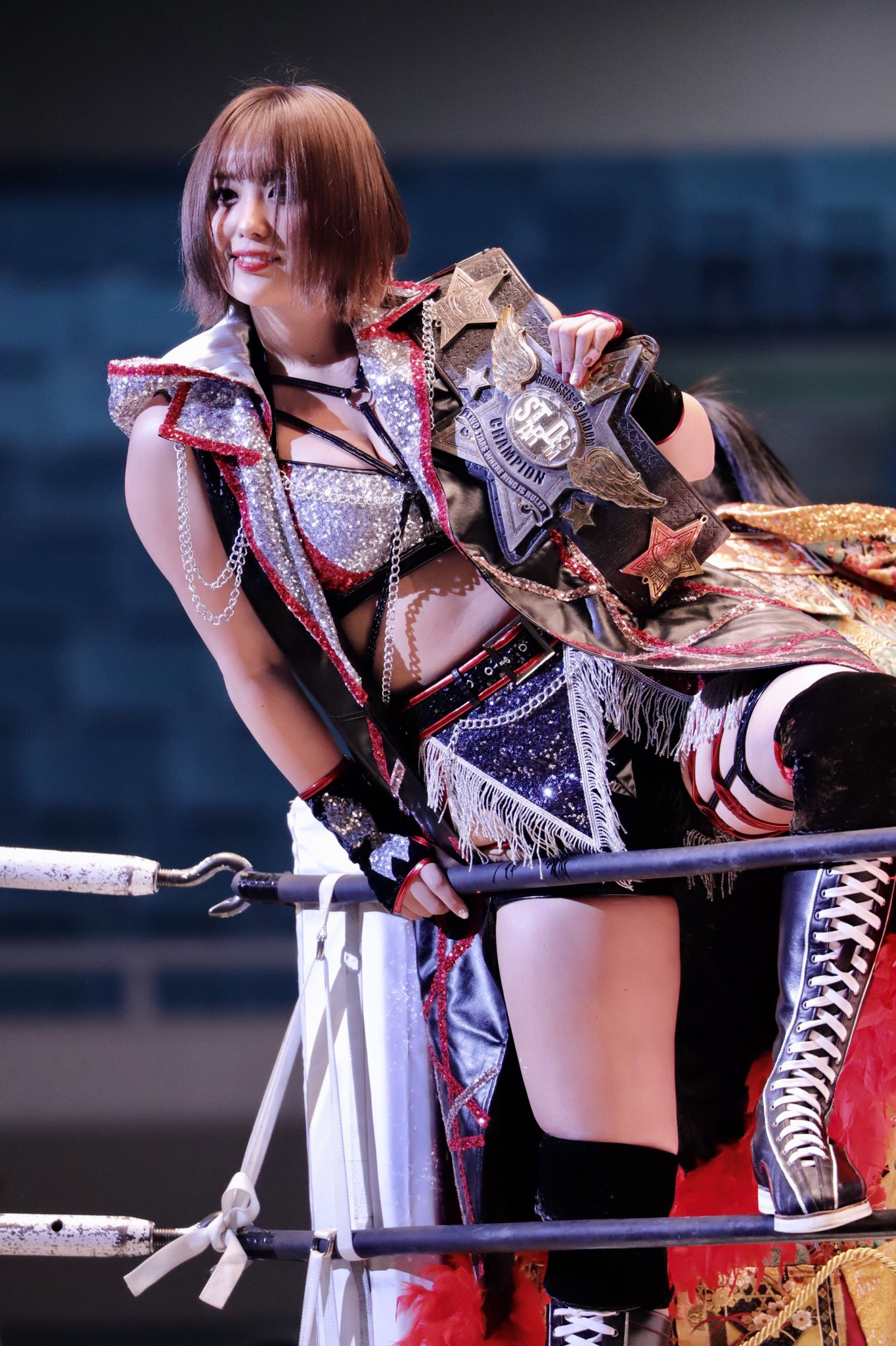
- Arita in March 2021

Personal information
- Born: Hana Arita; May 28, 1997 (age 29) Aomori, Japan

Professional wrestling career
- Ring name(s): Himeka; Himeka Arita
- Billed height: 5 ft 7.5 in (1.71 m)
- Billed weight: 68 kg (150 lb)
- Debut: 2017
- Retired: May 14, 2023

Hana Arita (有田ハナ, Arita Hana) better known by her ring name Himeka Arita (有田ひめか, Arita Himeka) or simply Himeka is a retired Japanese professional wrestler. She is best known for her time with the Japanese professional wrestling promotion World Wonder Ring Stardom where she is a former Goddesses of Stardom Champion and Artist of Stardom Champion. Arita is also known for her tenures with various promotions from the Japanese independent scene such as Pro Wrestling Wave and Seadlinnng.

== Professional wrestling career ==
=== Independent circuit (2017–2019) ===
Before signing with Stardom, Arita worked as a freelancer for various promotions. She made her professional wrestling debut in Actwres girl'Z, at AgZ Act 26, an event which took place on December 23, 2017 where she teamed up with Kakeru Sekiguchi and Miyuki Takase to face Nao Kakuta, Saori Anou and Tae Honma in a six-woman tag team match. She unsuccessfully challenged Takase for the vacant AgZ Championship at AgZ in Korakuen Hall on November 6, 2019. Arita once competed for All Japan Pro Wrestling, at AJPW GROWIN' UP Vol.10 on January 25, 2018 where she fell short to Natsumi Maki. At Ice Ribbon New Ice Ribbon #951 on March 31, 2019, Arita teamed up with Hiragi Kurumi in a losing effort to Akane Fujita and Risa Sera in a hardcore tag team match. At Oz Academy Come Back To Shima!, an event promoted on May 26, 2019, Arita competed in a battle royal also involving Mika Akino, Hiroyo Matsumoto, Sonoko Kato, Yoshiko and others.

=== Pro Wrestling Wave (2018–2020) ===
On April 22, 2018, Arita made her debut in Pro Wrestling Wave at WAVE Young Vol. 38 ~ Mika Iida Retirement Special in Shin-Kiba 1st Ring where she teamed up with Fairy Nihonbashi and Moeka Haruhi in a losing effort to Akane Fujita, Rina Yamashita and Rin Kadokura. She took part of the Catch the Wave tournament of 2019, placing herself in the "Visual Block" and scoring one point after competing against Nagisa Nozaki, Hikaru Shida and Yumi Ohka. One of the notable matches in which she wrestled was at the WAVE 12th Anniversary on August 12, 2019, where she teamed up with Miyuki Takase as The Beginning and unsuccessfully challenged Sakura Hirota and Yuki Miyazaki for the Wave Tag Team Championship.

=== World Wonder Ring Stardom (2020–2023) ===
Arita debuted in Stardom on June 21, 2020, at Stardom FC My Stardom ~ Stardom Is Again! as a mystery member for Giulia, Syuri and Maika, with whom she teamed up to defeat Stars (Mayu Iwatani, Tam Nakano, Starlight Kid and Saya Iida). She was revealed to be the newest recruit of the Donna Del Mondo stable led by Giulia. She took part in the 5Star Grand Prix 2020, scoring a total of eleven points. She fell short to Utami Hayashishita on the finals from September 19. At the 2020 edition of the Goddesses of Stardom Tag League, Arita teamed up with her fellow stablemate Syuri under the pseudonym "Grab The Top", placing themselves in the "Blue Goddess Block", and scoring a total of six points. At Stardom Yokohama Cinderella 2020 on October 3, Arita teamed up with Maika to unsuccessfully challenge AphrOditE (Saya Kamitani and Utami Hayashishita) for the Goddesses of Stardom Championship.

On the second night of the Stardom Go To Budokan! Valentine Special from February 14, 2021, Arita teamed up with Maika to defeat Oedo Tai's Bea Priestley and Konami for the Goddesses of Stardom Championship. At the 10th Anniversary of Stardom on March 3, 2021, Maika and Himeka defeated Natsuko Tora and Saki Kashima to retain the titles. One month later at Stardom Yokohama Dream Cinderella 2021 on April 4, they would lose the titles to fellow stablemates Giulia and Syuri. At the Stardom Cinderella Tournament 2021, Arita defeated Hanan in a first-round match on April 10 and Mayu Iwatani in the quarter-finals from May 14, but fell short to Saya Kamitani in the semi-finals which took place on June 12. At Stardom 5 Star Grand Prix 2021, Arita fought in the Red Stars block where she scored a total of ten points. At Stardom 10th Anniversary Grand Final Osaka Dream Cinderella on October 9, 2020, she retained the Artist of Stardom Championship alongside Maika and Natsupoi against Queen's Quest (Momo Watanabe, AZM and Saya Kamitani). At Tokyo Super Wars on November 27, she fell short to Saya Kamitani and Natsupoi in a three-way match to determine the number one contender for the Wonder of Stardom Championship. At Osaka Super Wars, the last event of the trilogy from December 18, Arita teamed up with Natsupoi and Maika and competed in a ¥10 Million Unit Tournament from which they emerged victorious with also retaining the Artist titles. At Stardom Dream Queendom on December 29, 2021, Arita, Maika and Natsupoi retained the Artist titles against Cosmic Angels (Mina Shirakawa, Unagi Sayaka and Mai Sakurai).

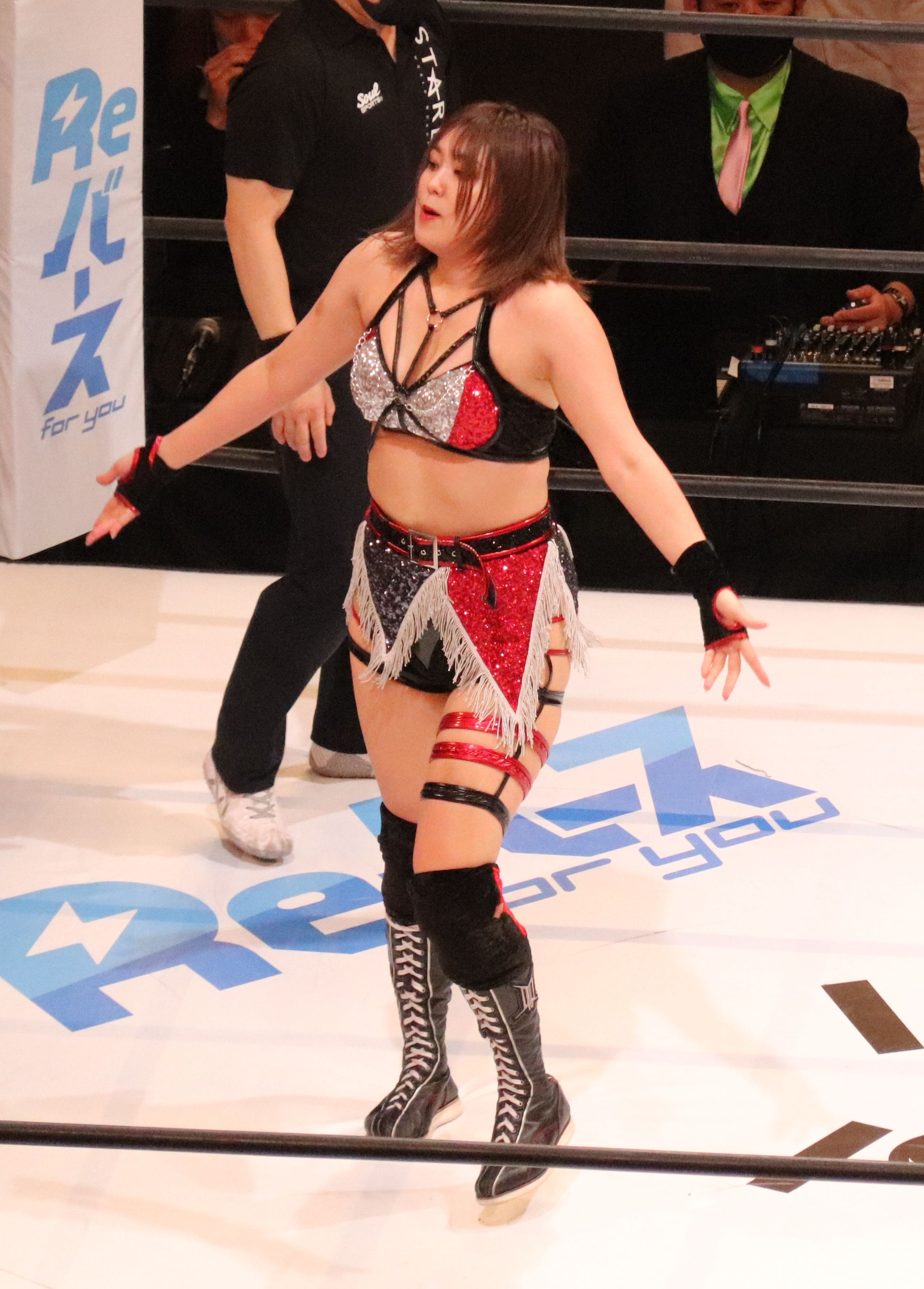
Arita on the second night of the Stardom World Climax 2022

At Stardom Nagoya Supreme Fight on January 29, 2022, Arita teamed up with Maika and unsuccessfully challenged FWC (Hazuki and Koguma) for the Goddesses of Stardom Championship. At the 2022 edition of the Cinderella Tournament, she defeated Ruaka in the first rounds and went into a time-limit draw against Syuri in the second rounds, which attracted an elimination for both. At Stardom Flashing Champions on May 28, 2022, Arita alongside Natsupoi and Maika dropped the Artist titles to Oedo Tai (Saki Kashima, Momo Watanabe and Starlight Kid). At Stardom Fight in the Top on June 26, 2022, Arits teamed up with Giulia and Mai Sakurai to attempt to get the Artist titles back to DDM, but failed to the retaining Oedo Tai team and God's Eye (Syuri, Ami Sourei and Mirai) in a three-way tag team match. At Mid Summer Champions in Nagoya on July 24, she teamed up with Giulia and Maika and again failed to capture the Artist titles from Starlight Kid, Momo Watanabe and Saki Kashima. In the 2022 edition of the Stardom Grand Prix, she fought in the "Red Stars" block from which she emerged runner up with a total of fifteen points, failing to qualify to the finals. At Stardom x Stardom: Nagoya Midsummer Encounter on August 21, 2022, she unsuccessfully challenged Saya Kamitani for the Wonder of Stardom Championship, replacing an unable to compete Kairi. At Stardom in Showcase vol.3 on November 26, 2022, she competed in a comedic traditional four-way match of the series won by Lady C and also involving Momo Kohgo and Saya Kamitani, in which the prize was a hair makeover from sponsor hairdresser saloon. At Stardom Dream Queendom 2 on December 29, 2022, she teamed up with Maika to defeat The New Eras (Mirai and Ami Sourei) and BMI2000 (Natsuko Tora and Ruaka) to become the number one contenders for the Goddesses of Stardom Championship.

In the Triangle Derby I, Arita teamed up with Maika and Lady C under the name of "MaiHime with C" and fought in the "Triangle Blue" block where they scored a total of four points, failing to qualify for the finals. At Stardom Supreme Fight 2023 on February 4, 2023, she alongside Maika unsuccessfully challenged 7Upp (Nanae Takahashi and Yuu) for the Goddesses of Stardom Championship.

==== Retirement road (February–May 2023) ====
On February 10, 2023, Arita announced her retirement from professional wrestling due to her wish of ending her career while still physically healthy, and completing her initial five-year professional career plan she established since her very debut. She underwent a series of events dubbed as "Himeka's Retirement Road", starting with Stardom in Showcase vol.4 on February 26, where she teamed up with Giulia and Maika to wrestle Prominence (Suzu Suzuki, Risa Sera and Hiragi Kurumi) into a time-limit draw. In the 2023 edition of the Cinderella Tournament, she fell short to Tam Nakano in the first rounds. On the finals night from April 15, 2023, she competed in her last tag match alongside Donna Del Mondo unit stablemates Giulia, Maika and Thekla to defeat Cosmic Angels (Tam Nakano, Natsupoi, Mina Shirakawa and Saki). Arita was scheduled to compete in what was dubbed as her "retirement match" at Stardom All Star Grand Queendom against her long time "MaiHime" tag team partner Maika. At the event, Arita lost to Maika.

On April 28, 2023, Arita competed at Bushiroad x Wave, a cross-over event produced by Stardom and Pro Wrestling Wave, the promotion in which she skyrocketed her popularity, where she defeated Sakura Hirota in a 30-minute iron woman match.

Arita wrestled her official retirement match on May 14, 2023, at Stardom Jumbo Princess Forever, an event specially created for her retirement ceremony. She competed in a 30-person gauntlet match in which she faced the big majority of the time's roster, going against each opponent up to one minute. The twenty-nine opponents were Ami Sourei, Aya Sakura, AZM, Giulia, Hanako, Hanan, Hazuki, Hina, Kakeru Sekiguchi, Koguma, Lady C, Maika, Mai Sakurai, Mayu Iwatani, Mina Shirakawa, Mirai, Miyu Amasaki, Miyuki Takase, Momo Watanabe, Natsuko Tora, Natsupoi, Rina, Ruaka, Saki Kashima, Saya Iida, Saya Kamitani, Starlight Kid, Syuri, Tam Nakano, Thekla, Utami Hayashishita and Waka Tsukiyama.

=== New Japan Pro Wrestling (2021) ===
Arita worked in an exhibition match for New Japan Pro Wrestling on January 5, 2021, in the second night of Wrestle Kingdom 15, where she teamed up with Natsupoi and Maika in a losing effort to Queen's Quest's (AZM, Saya Kamitani and Utami Hayashishita). At Historic X-Over on November 20, 2022, she teamed up with Mai Sakurai and Thekla, falling short to Queen's Quest (AZM, Lady C and Saya Kamitani).

== Championships and accomplishments ==
- World Wonder Ring Stardom
  - Artist of Stardom Championship (1 time) – with Maika and Natsupoi
  - Goddesses of Stardom Championship (1 time) – with Maika
  - 5★Star GP Award (1 time)
    - 5★Star GP Res Stars Best Match Award (2022) vs. Maika on October 1
  - Stardom Year-End Award (1 time)
    - Best Unit Award (2020) – Donna del Mondo, shared between Giulia, Maika, Natsupoi and Syuri
- Pro Wrestling Wave
  - Catch the Wave Award (1 time)
    - Best Bout Award (2019) vs. Nagisa Nozaki on July 1
- Seadlinnng
  - Beyond the Sea Tag Team Championship (1 time) – with Miyuki Takase
