= Stardom 5Star Grand Prix Tournament =

- Promotions: World Wonder Ring Stardom
- First event: 2012
- Signature matches: Time-limited singles matches

Stardom 5Star Grand Prix (Japanese: スターダム5スターグランプリ, Hepburn: Sutādamu Faibu Sutā Guranpuri) also stylized as the 5★Star Grand Prix or 5★Star GP is an annual round robin tournament promoted by the Japanese professional wrestling promotion World Wonder Ring Stardom. The event has been held since 2012 and aired domestically on Tokyo MX, Fighting TV Samurai and Nippon TV, and later as an internet pay-per-view on Stardom's streaming service Stardom World. It is considered to be the main annual competition promoted by Stardom, being preceded by the Stardom Cinderella Tournament which is the secondary competition.

== Tournament history ==
The Stardom 5 Star Grand Prix is a professional wrestling tournament held each summer by Stardom. Similar to Bushiroad-owned male counterpart New Japan Pro-Wrestling with the G1 Climax tournament, it is currently held as a round-robin tournament with wrestlers split into two pools. The winner of each pool will compete in the final to decide the winner.

As is the case with G1 Climax, a win is two points and a draw is one point for each wrestler.

There have been a total of ten editions that gave ten different champions. Seven of the title challenges were unsuccessful while only three were successful. Io Shirai successfully defended the World of Stardom Championship against three different tournament winners while Mayu Iwatani scored the only two defeats, dropping the same title.

In 2021, Stardom introduced the World of Stardom challenge rights certificate, in which the winner of 5 Star Grand Prix receives a contract for a future World of Stardom Championship match. Like NJPW's Tokyo Dome IWGP Heavyweight Championship challenge rights certificate, the contract is kept in a briefcase and can be defended until the title match.

== List of winners ==
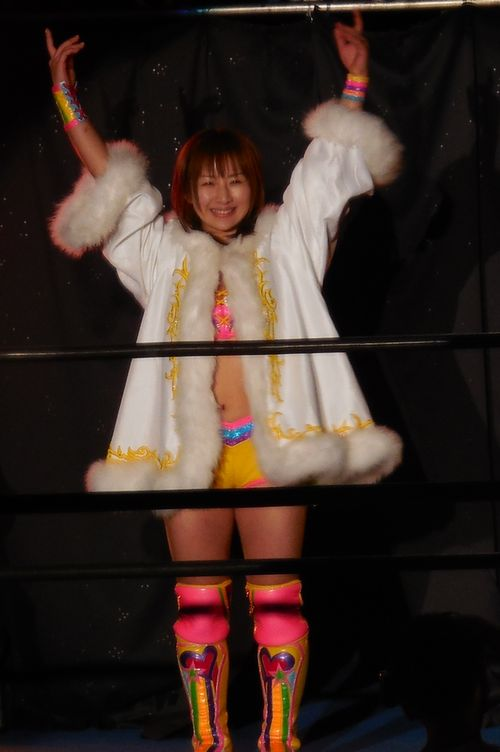
Winner of the first-ever edition of the tournament from 2012, Yuzuki Aikawa.

Year	Tournament				Aftermath			
Year	Winner	Runner-up	Times won	No. of entrants	Challenged for	Match	Result	Ref
2012	Yuzuki Aikawa	Kyoko Kimura	1	12	World of Stardom Championship	vs. Nanae Takahashi at Stardom Year-End Climax 2012	Lost	
2013	Nanae Takahashi	Alpha Female	1	12	World of Stardom Championship	vs. Io Shirai at Stardom Season 14 Goddesses In Stars 2013	Lost	
2014	Io Shirai	Yoshiko	1	12	Goddesses of Stardom Championship (Note: Until the 2014 edition of the tournament the winner could choose the title for which they would compete. Io Shirai chose the Goddesses of Stardom Championship since she and Heisei-gun stablemate Yoshiko shared a feud with Kairi Hojo & Nanae Takahashi's Showa-gun stable.)	with Yoshiko vs. Kairi Hojo & Nanae Takahashi at Stardom Queen Tradition 2014	Lost	
2015	Kairi Hojo	Hudson Envy	1	12	World of Stardom Championship	vs. Io Shirai at Stardom 5th Anniversary	Lost	
2016	Yoko Bito	Tessa Blanchard	1	14	World of Stardom Championship	vs. Io Shirai at Stardom October Showdown 2016	Lost	
2017	Toni Storm	Yoko Bito	1	16	World of Stardom Championship	vs. Mayu Iwatani at 5☆Star GP 2017 Champions in Nagoya	Won (Note: This title change was unplanned as Iwatani legitimately dislocated her elbow, prompting the referee to stop the match and award the championship to Storm.)	
2018	Mayu Iwatani	Utami Hayashishita	1	16	Wonder of Stardom Championship	vs. Momo Watanabe at Stardom True Fight 2018	Lost	
2019	Hana Kimura	Konami	1	18	World of Stardom Championship	vs. Bea Priestley at Stardom World Champion Wars 2019	Lost	
2020	Utami Hayashishita	Himeka	1	16	World of Stardom Championship	vs. Mayu Iwatani at Sendai Cinderella 2020	Won	
2021	Syuri	Momo Watanabe	1	20	World of Stardom Championship	vs. Utami Hayashishita at Stardom Dream Queendom 1	Won	
2022	Giulia	Tam Nakano	1	26	World of Stardom Championship	vs. Syuri at Stardom Dream Queendom 2	Won	
2023	Suzu Suzuki	Maika	1	20	World of Stardom Championship	vs. Maika at Stardom Dream Queendom 3	Lost	
2024	Maika	Saya Kamitani	1	28	World of Stardom Championship	vs. Tam Nakano at Stardom Namba Grand Fight	Lost	
2025	Momo Watanabe	AZM	1	32	World of Stardom Championship; Strong Women's Championship	vs. Saya Kamitani at Stardom Crimson Nightmare	Lost	
2026	Rina	Starlight Kid	1	32				

=== Record ===
Championship	Successful challenges	Attempts	Success rate
World of Stardom Championship	4	12	.333
Wonder of Stardom Championship	0	1	.000
Goddesses of Stardom Championship	0	1	.000
Strong Women's Championship	0	1	.000

== 2012 ==
2012
Tournament information
- Sport: Professional wrestling
- Location: Japan
- Dates: August 19, 2012–September 30, 2012
- Tournament format: Two-block round-robin
- Host: World Wonder Ring Stardom
- Participants: 12

Final positions
- Champions: Yuzuki Aikawa
- Runner-up: Kyoko Kimura

Tournament statistics
- Matches played: 31

The 2012 5Star Grand Prix took place from August 19 to September 30, 2012.

Final standings
A		B	
Yuzuki Aikawa	7	Kyoko Kimura	7
Nanae Takahashi	7	Natsuki Taiyo	7
Yoshiko	6	Miho Wakizawa	6
Io Shirai	5	Dark Angel	6
Yuhi	3	Saki Kashima	3
Act Yasukawa	2	Kairi Hojo	1

A	Aikawa	Shirai	Takahashi	Yasukawa	Yoshiko	Yuhi
Aikawa	—N/a	Aikawa (11:38)	Aikawa (12:59)	Yasukawa (8:39)	Draw (15:00)	Aikawa (8:01)
Shirai	Aikawa (11:38)	—N/a	Takahashi (14:56)	Shirai (7:36)	Shirai (9:49)	Draw (15:00)
Takahashi	Aikawa (12:59)	Takahashi (14:56)	—N/a	Takahashi (9:53)	Draw (15:00)	Takahashi (10:48)
Yasukawa	Yasukawa (8:39)	Shirai (7:36)	Takahashi (9:53)	—N/a	Yoshiko (9:30)	Yuhi (5:21)
Yoshiko	Draw (15:00)	Shirai (9:49)	Draw (15:00)	Yoshiko (9:30)	—N/a	Yoshiko (9:46)
Yuhi	Aikawa (8:01)	Draw (15:00)	Takahashi (10:48)	Yuhi (5:21)	Yoshiko (9:46)	—N/a
B	Angel	Hojo	Kashima	Kimura	Taiyo	Wakizawa
Angel	—N/a	Angel (6:08)	Angel (4:47)	Angel (11:34)	Taiyo (9:19)	Wakizawa (9:44)
Hojo	Angel (6:08)	—N/a	Kashima (4:21)	Draw (10:28)	Taiyo (7:45)	Wakizawa (5:35)
Kashima	Angel (4:47)	Kashima (4:21)	—N/a	Kimura (10:35)	Draw (15:00)	Wakizawa (10:40)
Kimura	Angel (11:34)	Draw (10:28)	Kimura (10:35)	—N/a	Kimura (10:50)	Kimura (9:15)
Taiyo	Taiyo (9:19)	Taiyo (7:45)	Draw (15:00)	Kimura (10:50)	—N/a	Taiyo (9:13)
Wakizawa	Wakizawa (9:44)	Wakizawa (5:35)	Wakizawa (10:40)	Kimura (9:15)	Taiyo (9:13)	—N/a

Final
A	Yuzuki Aikawa	Pin
B	Kyoko Kimura	16:34

== 2013 ==
2013
Tournament information
- Sport: Professional wrestling
- Location: Japan
- Dates: August 25, 2013–September 13, 2013
- Tournament format: Two-block round-robin
- Host: World Wonder Ring Stardom
- Participants: 12

Final positions
- Champions: Nanae Takahashi
- Runner-up: Alpha Female

Tournament statistics
- Matches played: 31

The 2013 5Star Grand Prix took place from August 25 to September 13, 2013.

Final standings
A		B	
Alpha Female	7	Nanae Takahashi	7
Io Shirai	7	Kyoko Kimura	6
Dark Angel	4	Natsuki Taiyo	5
Kairi Hojo	4	Yoshiko	5
Kaori Yoneyama	4	Yuhi	5
Takumi Iroha	4	Act Yasukawa	2

A	Angel	Female	Hojo	Iroha	Shirai	Yoneyama
Angel	—N/a	Female (6:53)	Angel (7:24)	Iroha (9:02)	Shirai (11:08)	Angel (10:13)
Female	Female (6:53)	—N/a	Female (8:31)	Draw (15:00)	Female (11:15)	Yoneyama
Hojo	Angel (7:24)	Female (8:31)	—N/a	Hojo (6:56)	Shirai (10:53)	Hojo (5:52)
Iroha	Iroha (9:02)	Draw (15:00)	Hojo (6:56)	—N/a	Draw (15:00)	Yoneyama (6:19)
Shirai	Shirai (11:08)	Female (11:15)	Shirai (10:53)	Draw (15:00)	—N/a	Shirai (10:16)
Yoneyama	Angel (10:13)	Yoneyama	Hojo (5:52)	Yoneyama (6:19)	Shirai (10:16)	—N/a
B	Kimura	Taiyo	Takahashi	Yasukawa	Yoshiko	Yuhi
Kimura	—N/a	Draw (10:18)	Kimura	Yasukawa (1:58)	Kimura (12:55)	Draw (15:00)
Taiyo	Draw (10:18)	—N/a	Takahashi (14:15)	Taiyo (13:31)	Taiyo (9:50)	Yuhi (10:34)
Takahashi	Kimura	Takahashi (14:15)	—N/a	Takahashi (13:44)	Draw (15:00)	Takahashi (14:07)
Yasukawa	Yasukawa (1:58)	Taiyo (13:31)	Takahashi (13:44)	—N/a	Yoshiko (9:02)	Yuhi (11:12)
Yoshiko	Kimura (12:55)	Taiyo (9:50)	Draw (15:00)	Yoshiko (9:02)	—N/a	Yoshiko (10:05)
Yuhi	Draw (15:00)	Yuhi (10:34)	Takahashi (14:07)	Yuhi (11:12)	Yoshiko (10:05)	—N/a

Final
A	Alpha Female	Pin
B	Nanae Takahashi	13:08

== 2014 ==
2014
Tournament information
- Sport: Professional wrestling
- Location: Japan
- Dates: August 24, 2014–September 23, 2014
- Tournament format: Two-block round-robin
- Host: World Wonder Ring Stardom
- Participants: 12

Final positions
- Champions: Io Shirai
- Runner-up: Yoshiko

Tournament statistics
- Matches played: 31

The 2014 5Star Grand Prix took place from August 24 to September 23, 2014.

Final standings
Blue		Red	
Yoshiko	7	Io Shirai	6
Mayu Iwatani	6	Nanae Takahashi	6
Kyoko Kimura	6	Kaori Yoneyama	5
Takumi Iroha	5	Cheerleader Melissa	5
Dash Chisako	4	Kairi Hojo	5
Koguma	2	Star Fire	3

Blue	Chisako	Iroha	Iwatani	Kimura	Koguma	Yoshiko
Chisako	—N/a	Iroha (6:51)	Chisako (9:22)	Kimura (9:24)	Chisako	Yoshiko (12:07)
Iroha	Iroha (6:51)	—N/a	Iroha (9:20)	Kimura (10:11)	Draw (15:00)	Yoshiko (12:36)
Iwatani	Chisako (9:22)	Iroha (9:20)	—N/a	Iwatani (11:28)	Iwatani (6:47)	Iwatani (11:20)
Kimura	Kimura (9:24)	Kimura (10:11)	Iwatani (11:28)	—N/a	Draw (7:57)	Draw (15:00)
Koguma	Chisako	Draw (15:00)	Iwatani (6:47)	Draw (7:57)	—N/a	Yoshiko (6:48)
Yoshiko	Yoshiko (12:07)	Yoshiko (12:36)	Iwatani (11:20)	Draw (15:00)	Yoshiko (6:48)	—N/a
Red	Fire	Hojo	Melissa	Shirai	Takahashi	Yoneyama
Fire	—N/a	Hojo (9:56)	Draw (15:00)	Shirai (8:21)	Takahashi (8:48)	Fire (6:26)
Hojo	Hojo (9:56)	—N/a	Melissa (9:45)	Shirai (12:28)	Hojo (13:33)	Draw (15:00)
Melissa	Draw (15:00)	Melissa (9:45)	—N/a	Melissa (14:19)	Takahashi (11:44)	Yoneyama (8:21)
Shirai	Shirai (8:21)	Shirai (12:28)	Melissa (14:19)	—N/a	Shirai (13:41)	Yoneyama (8:27)
Takahashi	Takahashi (8:48)	Hojo (13:33)	Takahashi (11:44)	Shirai (13:41)	—N/a	Takahashi (12:01)
Yoneyama	Fire (6:26)	Draw (15:00)	Yoneyama (8:21)	Yoneyama (8:27)	Takahashi (12:01)	—N/a

Final
Blue	Yoshiko	Pin
Red	Io Shirai	12:46

== 2015 ==
2015
Tournament information
- Sport: Professional wrestling
- Location: Japan
- Dates: August 23, 2015–September 23, 2015
- Tournament format: Two-block round-robin
- Host: World Wonder Ring Stardom
- Participants: 12

Final positions
- Champions: Kairi Hojo
- Runner-up: Hudson Envy

Tournament statistics
- Matches played: 31

The 2015 5Star Grand Prix took place from August 23 to September 23, 2015.

Final standings
Blue		Red	
Kairi Hojo	7	Hudson Envy	8
Kaoru	7	Io Shirai	7
Queen Maya	7	Kaori Yoneyama	5
Star Fire	5	La Rosa Negra	5
Chelsea	4	Mayu Iwatani	5
Haruka Kato	0	Kris Wolf	0

Blue	Chelsea	Fire	Hojo	Kaoru	Kato	Maya
Chelsea	—N/a	Fire (8:44)	Chelsea (14:37)	Kaoru (8:41)	Chelsea (5:10)	Maya (11:28)
Fire	Fire (8:44)	—N/a	Draw (15:00)	Kaoru (11:25)	Fire (6:51)	Maya (7:59)
Hojo	Chelsea (14:37)	Draw (15:00)	—N/a	Hojo (12:09)	Hojo (11:04)	Hojo (13:50)
Kaoru	Kaoru (8:41)	Kaoru (11:25)	Hojo (12:09)	—N/a	Kaoru (9:57)	Draw (15:00)
Kato	Chelsea (5:10)	Fire (6:51)	Hojo (11:04)	Kaoru (9:57)	—N/a	Maya (3:30)
Maya	Maya (11:28)	Maya (7:59)	Hojo (13:50)	Draw (15:00)	Maya (3:30)	—N/a
Red	Envy	Iwatani	Negra	Shirai	Wolf	Yoneyama
Envy	—N/a	Iwatani (4:54)	Envy (10:59)	Envy (14:48)	Envy w/o	Envy (7:55)
Iwatani	Iwatani (4:54)	—N/a	Negra (14:04)	Draw (15:00)	Iwatani w/o	Yoneyama (9:10)
Negra	Envy (10:59)	Negra (14:04)	—N/a	Shirai (11:12)	Negra (8:14)	Draw (15:00)
Shirai	Envy (14:48)	Draw (15:00)	Shirai (11:12)	—N/a	Shirai (9:13)	Shirai (11:01)
Wolf	Envy w/o	Iwatani w/o	Negra (8:14)	Shirai (9:13)	—N/a	Yoneyama w/o
Yoneyama	Envy (7:55)	Yoneyama (9:10)	Draw (15:00)	Shirai (11:01)	Yoneyama w/o	—N/a

Final
Blue	Kairi Hojo	Pin
Red	Hudson Envy	18:16

== 2016 ==
2016
Tournament information
- Sport: Professional wrestling
- Location: Japan
- Dates: August 21, 2016–September 22, 2016
- Tournament format: Two-block round-robin
- Host: World Wonder Ring Stardom
- Participants: 14

Final positions
- Champions: Yoko Bito
- Runner-up: Tessa Blanchard

Tournament statistics
- Matches played: 43

The 2016 5Star Grand Prix took place from August 21 to September 22, 2016. Kairi Hojo withdrew from the tournament on September 8 after suffering a concussion in her match against Io Shirai.

Final standings
Blue Stars		Red Stars	
Yoko Bito	9	Tessa Blanchard	10
Kay Lee Ray	9	Io Shirai	9
Mayu Iwatani	8	Momo Watanabe	8
Toni Storm	8	Kairi Hojo	6
Blue Nikita	6	Courtney Stewart	4
Natsumi Maki	2	Jungle Kyona	4
Hiromi Mimura	0	Kris Wolf	1

Blue Stars	Bito	Iwatani	Maki	Mimura	Nikita	Ray	Storm
Bito	—N/a	Draw (15:00)	Bito (4:47)	Bito (4:56)	Bito (8:51)	Bito (14:01)	Storm (10:51)
Iwatani	Draw (15:00)	—N/a	Iwatani (7:19)	Iwatani (8:28)	Iwatani (7:04)	Ray (11:21)	Draw (9:28)
Maki	Bito (4:47)	Iwatani (7:19)	—N/a	Maki (5:24)	Nikita (6:44)	Ray (6:21)	Storm (5:57)
Mimura	Bito (4:56)	Iwatani (8:28)	Maki (5:24)	—N/a	Nikita (5:44)	Ray (8:08)	Storm (6:20)
Nikita	Bito (8:51)	Iwatani (7:04)	Nikita (6:44)	Nikita (5:44)	—N/a	Ray (9:24)	Nikita (10:08)
Ray	Bito (14:01)	Ray (11:21)	Ray (6:21)	Ray (8:08)	Ray (9:24)	—N/a	Draw (15:00)
Storm	Storm (10:51)	Draw (9:28)	Storm (5:57)	Storm (6:20)	Nikita (10:08)	Draw (15:00)	—N/a
Red Stars	Blanchard	Hojo	Kyona	Shirai	Stewart	Watanabe	Wolf
Blanchard	—N/a	Blanchard w/o (Note: This match was won by forfeit, as Hojo withdrew from the tournament prior to the match.)	Blanchard (9:52)	Shirai (10:33)	Blanchard (5:21)	Blanchard (6:45)	Blanchard (6:36)
Hojo	Blanchard w/o	—N/a	Kyona w/o	Hojo (14:34)	Hojo (11:37)	Watanabe w/o	Hojo (10:42)
Kyona	Blanchard (9:52)	Kyona w/o	—N/a	Shirai (11:09)	Stewart (6:34)	Watanabe (12:10)	Kyona (7:33)
Shirai	Shirai (10:33)	Hojo (14:34)	Shirai (11:09)	—N/a	Shirai w/o	Shirai (9:51)	Draw (9:40)
Stewart	Blanchard (5:21)	Hojo (11:37)	Stewart (6:34)	Shirai w/o	—N/a	Watanabe (5:08)	Stewart (5:26)
Watanabe	Blanchard (6:45)	Watanabe w/o	Watanabe (12:10)	Shirai (9:51)	Watanabe (5:08)	—N/a	Watanabe (7:24)
Wolf	Blanchard (6:36)	Hojo (10:42)	Kyona (7:33)	Draw (9:40)	Stewart (5:26)	Watanabe (7:24)	—N/a

Final
Blue	Yoko Bito	Pin
Red	Tessa Blanchard	16:27

== 2017 ==
2017
Tournament information
- Sport: Professional wrestling
- Location: Japan
- Dates: August 19, 2017–September 8, 2017
- Tournament format: Two-block round-robin
- Host: World Wonder Ring Stardom
- Participants: 16

Final positions
- Champions: Toni Storm
- Runner-up: Yoko Bito

Tournament statistics
- Matches played: 57

The 2017 5Star Grand Prix took place from August 19 to September 8, 2017. Tam Nakano earned the final spot in the tournament by defeating Natsuko Tora in a qualifying match at Midsummer Champions 2017 on August 13, 2017.

Final standings
Blue Stars		Red Stars	
Toni Storm	11	Yoko Bito	10
Io Shirai	10	Viper	10
Kay Lee Ray	8	Kagetsu	10
Mandy Leon	8	Mayu Iwatani	10
HZK	7	Hana Kimura	8
Jungle Kyona	6	Hiromi Mimura	4
Tam Nakano	2	Xia Brookside	2
Konami	2	Kris Wolf	2

Blue Stars	HZK	Konami	Kyona	Leon	Nakano	Ray	Shirai	Storm
HZK	—N/a	HZK (4:16)	Kyona (8:45)	Leon (4:34)	HZK (7:14)	HZK (5:18)	Draw (15:00)	Storm (7:08)
Konami	HZK (4:16)	—N/a	Kyona (6:28)	Konami (5:00)	Nakano (6:02)	Ray (5:01)	Shirai (9:12)	Storm (7:16)
Kyona	Kyona (8:45)	Kyona (6:28)	—N/a	Kyona (9:48)	Kyona (9:15)	Ray (8:08)	Shirai (11:30)	Storm (6:56)
Leon	Leon (4:34)	Konami (5:00)	Kyona (9:48)	—N/a	Leon (7:40)	Ray (8:18)	Leon (10:52)	Leon (9:28)
Nakano	HZK (7:14)	Nakano (6:02)	Kyona (9:15)	Leon (7:40)	—N/a	Ray (5:42)	Shirai (9:54)	Storm (6:51)
Ray	HZK (5:18)	Ray (5:01)	Ray (8:08)	Ray (8:18)	Ray (5:42)	—N/a	Shirai (11:54)	Storm (8:21)
Shirai	Draw (15:00)	Shirai (9:12)	Shirai (11:30)	Leon (10:52)	Shirai (9:54)	Shirai (11:54)	—N/a	Draw (15:00)
Storm	Storm (7:08)	Storm (7:16)	Storm (6:56)	Leon (9:28)	Storm (6:51)	Storm (8:21)	Draw (15:00)	—N/a
Red Stars	Bito	Brookside	Iwatani	Kagetsu	Kimura	Mimura	Viper	Wolf
Bito	—N/a	Bito (3:47)	Iwatani (10:00)	Bito (7:54)	Kimura (8:43)	Bito (5:34)	Bito (6:56)	Bito (5:59)
Brookside	Bito (3:47)	—N/a	Iwatani (7:48)	Kagetsu (6:17)	Kimura (8:16)	Mimura (4:51)	Viper (5:52)	Brookside (4:58)
Iwatani	Iwatani (10:00)	Iwatani (7:48)	—N/a	Kagetsu (12:18)	Iwatani (9:10)	Iwatani (7:49)	Viper (8:39)	Iwatani (7:51)
Kagetsu	Bito (7:54)	Kagetsu (6:17)	Kagetsu (12:18)	—N/a	Kagetsu (11:48)	Kagetsu (7:26)	Viper (9:38)	Kagetsu (6:54)
Kimura	Kimura (8:43)	Kimura (8:16)	Iwatani (9:10)	Kagetsu (11:48)	—N/a	Kimura (9:31)	Viper (9:36)	Kimura (5:34)
Mimura	Bito (5:34)	Mimura (4:51)	Iwatani (7:49)	Kagetsu (7:26)	Kimura (9:31)	—N/a	Viper (5:56)	Mimura (6:40)
Viper	Bito (6:56)	Viper (5:52)	Viper (8:39)	Viper (9:38)	Viper (9:36)	Viper (5:56)	—N/a	Wolf (5:14)
Wolf	Bito (5:59)	Brookside (4:58)	Iwatani (7:51)	Kagetsu (6:54)	Kimura (5:34)	Mimura (6:40)	Wolf (5:14)	—N/a

Final
Blue	Toni Storm	Pin
Red	Yoko Bito	8:17

== 2018 ==
2018
Tournament information
- Sport: Professional wrestling
- Location: Japan
- Dates: August 18, 2018–September 24, 2018
- Tournament format: Two-block round-robin
- Host: World Wonder Ring Stardom
- Participants: 16

Final positions
- Champions: Mayu Iwatani
- Runner-up: Utami Hayashishita

Tournament statistics
- Matches played: 57

The 2018 5 Star Grand Prix took place from August 18 to September 24, 2018.

Final standings
Blue Stars		Red Stars	
Mayu Iwatani	9	Utami Hayashishita	10
Hazuki	9	Kagetsu	9
Momo Watanabe	8	Rachael Ellering	9
Nicole Savoy	8	Jungle Kyona	8
Kelly Klein	8	Konami	6
Jamie Hayter	6	Kimber Lee	6
Natsu Sumire	4	Natsuko Tora	4
Saki Kashima	4	Tam Nakano	4

Blue Stars	Iwatani	Watanabe	Kashima	Hazuki	Sumire	Klein	Savoy	Hayter
Iwatani	—N/a	Draw (15:00)	Kashima (9:55)	Iwatani (11:42)	Iwatani (13:31)	Klein (10:20)	Iwatani (7:53)	Iwatani (7:55)
Watanabe	Draw (15:00)	—N/a	Kashima (8:01)	Draw (15:00)	Sumire (7:40)	Watanabe (10:24)	Watanabe (7:53)	Watanabe (7:07)
Kashima	Kashima (9:55)	Kashima (8:01)	—N/a	Hazuki (6:54)	Sumire w/o	Klein (6:14)	Savoy (5:31)	Hayter (3:55)
Hazuki	Iwatani (11:42)	Draw (15:00)	Hazuki (6:54)	—N/a	Hazuki (5:23)	Hazuki (9:39)	Savoy (7:06)	Hazuki (7:48)
Sumire	Iwatani (13:31)	Sumire (7:40)	Sumire w/o	Hazuki (5:23)	—N/a	Klein (6:13)	Savoy (8:56)	Hayter (7:38)
Klein	Klein (10:20)	Watanabe (10:24)	Klein (6:14)	Hazuki (9:39)	Klein (6:13)	—N/a	Savoy (6:24)	Klein (6:57)
Savoy	Iwatani (7:53)	Watanabe (7:53)	Savoy (5:31)	Savoy (7:06)	Savoy (8:56)	Savoy (6:24)	—N/a	Hayter (5:20)
Hayter	Iwatani (7:55)	Watanabe (7:07)	Hayter (3:55)	Hazuki (7:48)	Hayter (7:38)	Klein (6:57)	Hayter (5:20)	—N/a
Red Stars	Kagetsu	Kyona	Nakano	Konami	Tora	Hayashishita	Ellering	Lee
Kagetsu	—N/a	Draw (15:00)	Nakano (6:41)	Konami (13:10)	Kagetsu (11:35)	Kagetsu (13:30)	Kagetsu (13:58)	Kagetsu (6:47)
Kyona	Draw (15:00)	—N/a	Kyona (10:48)	Kyona (10:29)	Tora (8:09)	Draw (15:00)	Ellering (10:05)	Kyona (7:40)
Nakano	Nakano (6:41)	Kyona (10:48)	—N/a	Nakano (6:30)	Tora (9:46)	Hayashishita (7:09)	Ellering (8:30)	Lee (6:50)
Konami	Konami (13:10)	Kyona (10:29)	Nakano (6:30)	—N/a	Konami (7:34)	Hayashishita (6:48)	Ellering (7:39)	Konami (6:13)
Tora	Kagetsu (11:35)	Tora (8:09)	Tora (9:46)	Konami (7:34)	—N/a	Hayashishita (7:33)	Ellering (5:39)	Lee (7:09)
Hayashishita	Kagetsu (13:30)	Draw (15:00)	Hayashishita (7:09)	Hayashishita (6:48)	Hayashishita (7:33)	—N/a	Draw (15:00)	Hayashishita (6:44)
Ellering	Kagetsu (13:58)	Ellering (10:05)	Ellering (8:30)	Ellering (7:39)	Ellering (5:39)	Draw (15:00)	—N/a	Lee (3:17)
Lee	Kagetsu (6:47)	Kyona (7:40)	Lee (6:50)	Konami (6:13)	Lee (7:09)	Hayashishita (6:44)	Lee (3:17)	—N/a

Final
Blue	Mayu Iwatani	Pin
Red	Utami Hayashishita	15:56

== 2019 ==
2019
Tournament information
- Sport: Professional wrestling
- Location: Japan
- Dates: August 17, 2019–September 22, 2019
- Tournament format: Two-block round-robin
- Host: World Wonder Ring Stardom
- Participants: 18

Final positions
- Champions: Hana Kimura
- Runner-up: Konami

Tournament statistics
- Matches played: 73

The 2019 5 Star Grand Prix took place from August 17 to September 22, 2019. Utami Hayashishita withdrew from the tournament on September 7 due to a finger injury. Jungle Kyona withdrew from the tournament on September 14 due to a dislocated shoulder.

Final standings
Blue Stars		Red Stars	
Konami	11	Hana Kimura	10
Bea Priestley	10	Tam Nakano	10
Jamie Hayter	10	Momo Watanabe	10
Arisa Hoshiki	9	AZM	8
Kagetsu	9	Hazuki	8
Andras Miyagi	7	Mayu Iwatani	8
Utami Hayashishita	6	Avary	8
Jungle Kyona	6	Saki Kashima	6
Natsuko Tora	4	Natsu Sumire	4

Blue Stars	Priestley	Hoshiki	Kagetsu	Kyona	Konami	Hayashishita	Miyagi	Tora	Hayter
Priestley	—N/a	Hoshiki (8:25)	Kagetsu (11:31)	Kyona (12:56)	Priestley (7:29)	Priestley w/o (Note: This match was won by forfeit, as Hayashishita withdrew from the tournament prior to the match.)	Priestley (5:47)	Priestley (8:16)	Priestley (10:07)
Hoshiki	Hoshiki (8:25)	—N/a	Draw (15:00)	Hoshiki w/o (Note: This match was won by forfeit, as Kyona withdrew from the tournament prior to the match.)	Konami (8:04)	Hayashishita (11:52)	Miyagi (9:44)	Hoshiki (10:14)	Hayter (7:14)
Kagetsu	Kagetsu (11:31)	Draw (15:00)	—N/a	Kyona (11:29)	Konami (12:16)	Kagetsu w/o	Miyagi (12:09)	Kagetsu (8:48)	Kagetsu (4:13)
Kyona	Kyona (12:56)	Hoshiki w/o	Kyona (11:29)	—N/a	Konami w/o	Hayashishita (9:27)	Miyagi (5:47)	Kyona (8:37)	Hayter (7:16)
Konami	Priestley (7:29)	Konami (8:04)	Konami (12:16)	Konami w/o	—N/a	Konami (9:08)	Draw (15:00)	Konami (5:38)	Hayter (7:45)
Hayashishita	Priestley w/o	Hayashishita (11:52)	Kagetsu w/o	Hayashishita (9:27)	Konami (9:08)	—N/a	Miyagi w/o	Tora w/o	Hayashishita (9:23)
Miyagi	Priestley (5:47)	Miyagi (9:44)	Miyagi (12:09)	Miyagi (5:47)	Draw (15:00)	Miyagi w/o	—N/a	Tora (7:18)	Hayter (5:45)
Tora	Priestley (8:16)	Hoshiki (10:14)	Kagetsu (8:48)	Kyona (8:37)	Konami (5:38)	Tora w/o	Tora (7:18)	—N/a	Hayter (7:58)
Hayter	Priestley (10:07)	Hayter (7:14)	Kagetsu (4:13)	Hayter (7:16)	Hayter (7:45)	Hayashishita (9:23)	Hayter (5:45)	Hayter (7:58)	—N/a
Red Stars	Iwatani	Kashima	Hazuki	Watanabe	Kimura	Nakano	Sumire	AZM	Avary
Iwatani	—N/a	Kashima (4:26)	Hazuki (8:40)	Watanabe (9:24)	Iwatani (11:59)	Iwatani (11:14)	Sumire (4:09)	Iwatani (5:04)	Iwatani (6:30)
Kashima	Kashima (4:26)	—N/a	Kashima (2:47)	Watanabe (3:33)	Kashima (0:08)	Nakano (4:31)	Sumire (8:48)	AZM (3:34)	Avary (4:14)
Hazuki	Hazuki (8:40)	Kashima (2:47)	—N/a	Hazuki (8:54)	Kimura (11:49)	Nakano (5:48)	Hazuki (4:10)	AZM (5:48)	Hazuki (5:43)
Watanabe	Watanabe (9:24)	Watanabe (3:33)	Hazuki (8:54)	—N/a	Kimura (10:54)	Nakano (8:55)	Watanabe (5:58)	Watanabe (10:27)	Watanabe (4:22)
Kimura	Iwatani (11:59)	Kashima (0:08)	Kimura (11:49)	Kimura (10:54)	—N/a	Kimura (6:41)	Kimura (7:31)	AZM (7:18)	Kimura (6:43)
Nakano	Iwatani (11:14)	Nakano (4:31)	Nakano (5:48)	Nakano (8:55)	Kimura (6:41)	—N/a	Nakano (7:05)	Nakano (5:10)	Avary (6:21)
Sumire	Sumire (4:09)	Sumire (8:48)	Hazuki (4:10)	Watanabe (5:58)	Kimura (7:31)	Nakano (7:05)	—N/a	AZM (5:39)	Avary (5:18)
AZM	Iwatani (5:04)	AZM (3:34)	AZM (5:48)	Watanabe (10:27)	AZM (7:18)	Nakano (5:10)	AZM (5:39)	—N/a	Avary (6:25)
Avary	Iwatani (6:30)	Avary (4:14)	Hazuki (5:43)	Watanabe (4:22)	Kimura (6:43)	Avary (6:21)	Avary (5:18)	Avary (6:25)	—N/a

Final
Blue	Konami	Sub
Red	Hana Kimura	14:18

== 2020 ==
2020
Tournament information
- Sport: Professional wrestling
- Location: Japan
- Dates: August 8, 2020–September 29, 2020
- Tournament format: Two-block round-robin
- Host: World Wonder Ring Stardom
- Participants: 16

Final positions
- Champions: Utami Hayashishita
- Runner-up: Himeka

Tournament statistics
- Matches played: 57

The 2020 5 Star Grand Prix took place from August 8 to September 29, 2020.

Final standings
Blue Stars		Red Stars	
Utami Hayashishita	10	Himeka	11
Syuri	9	Mayu Iwatani	10
Maika	8	Tam Nakano	8
Momo Watanabe	8	Konami	8
Jungle Kyona	7	Giulia	8
Natsuko Tora	6	Saya Kamitani	5
AZM	6	Death Yama-san	4
Saya Iida	2	Starlight Kid	2

Blue Stars	Watanabe	Hayashishita	Kyona	AZM	Tora	Iida	Syuri	Maika
Watanabe	—N/a	Draw (20:00)	Draw (4:53)	Watanabe (9:54)	Tora (9:09)	Watanabe (6:28)	Watanabe w/o	Maika (8:12)
Hayashishita	Draw (20:00)	—N/a	Hayashishita (14:38)	Hayashishita (12:02)	Hayashishita (10:18)	Hayashishita (5:54)	Draw (20:00)	Maika (13:55)
Kyona	Draw (4:53)	Hayashishita (14:38)	—N/a	Kyona (9:41)	Kyona (8:50)	Kyona (6:35)	Syuri (12:39)	Maika (10:02)
AZM	Watanabe (9:54)	Hayashishita (12:02)	Kyona (9:41)	—N/a	Tora (7:30)	AZM (8:03)	AZM (9:34)	AZM (6:52)
Tora	Tora (9:09)	Hayashishita (10:18)	Kyona (8:50)	Tora (7:30)	—N/a	Iida (4:56)	Syuri (7:46)	Tora (7:03)
Iida	Watanabe (6:28)	Hayashishita (5:54)	Kyona (6:35)	AZM (8:03)	Iida (4:56)	—N/a	Syuri (8:31)	Maika (7:19)
Syuri	Watanabe w/o	Draw (20:00)	Syuri (12:39)	AZM (9:34)	Syuri (7:46)	Syuri (8:31)	—N/a	Syuri (9:20)
Maika	Maika (8:12)	Maika (13:55)	Maika (10:02)	AZM (6:52)	Tora (7:03)	Maika (7:19)	Syuri (9:20)	—N/a
Red Stars	Iwatani	Giulia	Nakano	Konami	Kid	Kamitani	Death	Himeka
Iwatani	—N/a	Giulia (17:28)	Iwatani (9:21)	Konami (13:39)	Iwatani (13:33)	Iwatani (10:35)	Iwatani (4:13)	Iwatani (8:10)
Giulia	Giulia (17:28)	—N/a	Nakano (10:24)	Konami (11:26)	Giulia (9:27)	Giulia (11:25)	Giulia (4:59)	Himeka (15:14)
Nakano	Iwatani (9:21)	Nakano (10:24)	—N/a	Nakano (10:50)	Nakano (6:58)	Kamitani (11:06)	Nakano (4:12)	Himeka (16:17)
Konami	Konami (13:39)	Konami (11:26)	Nakano (10:50)	—N/a	Konami (6:31)	Konami (8:06)	Death (5:34)	Himeka (10:02)
Kid	Iwatani (13:33)	Giulia (9:27)	Nakano (6:58)	Konami (6:31)	—N/a	Kamitani (6:31)	Kid (3:01)	Himeka (8:32)
Kamitani	Iwatani (10:35)	Giulia (11:25)	Kamitani (11:06)	Konami (8:06)	Kamitani (6:31)	—N/a	Death (4:35)	Draw (20:00)
Death	Iwatani (4:13)	Giulia (4:59)	Nakano (4:12)	Death (5:34)	Kid (3:01)	Death (4:35)	—N/a	Himeka (4:31)
Himeka	Iwatani (8:10)	Himeka (15:14)	Himeka (16:17)	Himeka (10:02)	Himeka (8:32)	Draw (20:00)	Himeka (4:31)	—N/a

Final
Blue	Utami Hayashishita	Pin
Red	Himeka	10:19

== 2021 ==
2021
Tournament information
- Sport: Professional wrestling
- Location: Japan
- Dates: July 31, 2021–September 25, 2021
- Tournament format: Two-block round-robin
- Host: World Wonder Ring Stardom
- Participants: 20

Final positions
- Champions: Syuri
- Runner-up: Momo Watanabe

Tournament statistics
- Matches played: 91

The 2021 5 Star Grand Prix took place from July 31 to September 25, 2021.

Final standings
Red Stars		Blue Stars	
Momo Watanabe	12	Syuri	12
Mayu Iwatani	11	Saya Kamitani	11
Koguma	11	Takumi Iroha	11
Starlight Kid	11	Konami	10
Himeka	10	Utami Hayashishita	10
Fukigen Death	10	Tam Nakano	10
Natsupoi	9	Maika	9
Giulia	6	Unagi Sayaka	9
Mina Shirakawa	6	AZM	8
Saki Kashima	4	Ruaka	0

Red Stars	Giulia	Iwatani	Watanabe	Death	Kashima	Kid	Himeka	Natsupoi	Koguma	Shirakawa
Giulia	—N/a	Iwatani (18:30)	Watanabe w/o	Death w/o (Note: Giulia sustained a legit injury and withdrew. Himeka, Natsupoi, Momo Watanabe and Fukigen Death were awarded walkover wins against Giulia.)	Kashima (9:59)	Giulia (13:47)	Himeka w/o	Natsupoi w/o	Giulia (14:31)	Giulia (5:33)
Iwatani	Iwatani (18:30)	—N/a	Watanabe (17:37)	Death (3:57)	Kashima (7:47)	Iwatani (6:19)	Iwatani (15:39)	Iwatani (10:09)	Draw (10:01)	Iwatani (9:00)
Watanabe	Watanabe w/o	Watanabe (17:37)	—N/a	Watanabe (1:24)	Watanabe (5:34)	Kid (9:24)	Himeka (15:57)	Natsupoi (9:44)	Watanabe (9:14)	Watanabe (8:26)
Death	Death w/o	Death (3:57)	Watanabe (1:24)	—N/a	Death (1:52)	Kid (5:19)	Death (4:44)	Natsupoi (3:57)	Death (3:34)	Shirakawa (4:39)
Kashima	Kashima (9:59)	Kashima (7:47)	Watanabe (5:34)	Death (1:52)	—N/a	Kid (8:46)	Himeka (8:56)	Natsupoi (5:24)	Koguma (7:01)	Shirakawa (10:12)
Kid	Giulia (13:47)	Iwatani (6:19)	Kid (9:24)	Kid (5:19)	Kid (8:46)	—N/a	Kid (11:31)	Draw (9:43)	Koguma (12:00)	Kid (10:11)
Himeka	Himeka w/o	Iwatani (15:39)	Himeka (15:57)	Death (4:44)	Himeka (8:56)	Kid (11:31)	—N/a	Himeka (12:12)	Koguma (6:19)	Himeka (8:16)
Natsupoi	Natsupoi w/o	Iwatani (10:09)	Nastupoi (9:44)	Natsupoi (3:57)	Natsupoi (5:24)	Draw (9:43)	Himeka (12:12)	—N/a	Koguma (10:16)	Shirakawa (7:27)
Koguma	Giulia (14:31)	Draw (10:01)	Watanabe (9:14)	Death (3:34)	Koguma (7:01)	Koguma (12:00)	Koguma (6:19)	Koguma (10:16)	—N/a	Koguma (12:22)
Shirakawa	Giulia (5:33)	Iwatani (9:00)	Watanabe (8:26)	Shirakawa (4:39)	Shirakawa (10:12)	Kid (10:11)	Himeka (8:16)	Shirakawa (7:27)	Koguma (12:22)	—N/a
Blue Stars	Hayashishita	Syuri	Nakano	Kamitani	Maika	AZM	Konami	Ruaka	Sayaka	Iroha
Hayashishita	—N/a	Draw (20:00)	Nakano (13:55)	Hayashishita (14:19)	Maika (19:26)	Hayashishita (8:50)	Konami (11:26)	Hayashishita (8:16)	Hayashishita (11:35)	Draw (20:00)
Syuri	Draw (20:00)	—N/a	Syuri (12:11)	Syuri (14:37)	Syuri (16:38)	AZM (13:38)	Konami (13:14)	Syuri (6:04)	Syuri (11:17)	Draw (20:00)
Nakano	Nakano (13:55)	Syuri (12:11)	—N/a	Kamitani (13:18)	Nakano (7:37)	Nakano (12:20)	Nakano (10:45)	Nakano (7:41)	Sayaka (13:16)	Iroha (14:54)
Kamitani	Hayashishita (14:19)	Syuri (14:37)	Kamitani (13:18)	—N/a	Kamitani (11:11)	Kamitani (8:34)	Kamitani (11:04)	Kamitani (7:40)	Sayaka (11:53)	Draw (13:08)
Maika	Maika (19:26)	Syuri (16:38)	Nakano (7:37)	Kamitani (11:11)	—N/a	Maika (7:58)	Maika (6:11)	Maika (4:44)	Draw (20:00)	Iroha (13:45)
AZM	Hayashishita (8:50)	AZM (13:38)	Nakano (12:20)	Kamitani (8:34)	Maika (7:58)	—N/a	AZM (6:20)	AZM (3:39)	Sayaka (8:21)	AZM (8:55)
Konami	Konami (11:26)	Konami (13:14)	Nakano (10:45)	Kamitani (11:04)	Maika (6:11)	AZM (6:20)	—N/a	Konami (5:19)	Konami (11:33)	Konami (10:41)
Ruaka	Hayashishita (8:16)	Syuri (6:04)	Nakano (7:41)	Kamitani (7:40)	Maika (4:44)	AZM (7:40)	Konami (5:19)	—N/a	Sayaka (3:39)	Iroha (8:20)
Sayaka	Hayashishita (11:35)	Syuri (11:17)	Sayaka (13:16)	Sayaka (11:53)	Draw (20:00)	Sayaka (8:21)	Konami (11:33)	Sayaka (7:40)	—N/a	Iroha (13:34)
Iroha	Draw (20:00)	Draw (20:00)	Iroha (14:54)	Draw (13:08)	Iroha (13:45)	AZM (8:55)	Konami (10:41)	Iroha (8:20)	Iroha (13:34)	—N/a

Final; September 25
Red	Momo Watanabe	Pin
Blue	Syuri	18:36

== 2022 ==
2022
Tournament information
- Sport: Professional wrestling
- Location: Japan
- Dates: July 30, 2022–October 1, 2022
- Tournament format: Two-block round-robin
- Host: World Wonder Ring Stardom
- Participants: 26

Final positions
- Champions: Giulia
- Runner-up: Tam Nakano

Tournament statistics
- Matches played: 157

The 2022 5 Star Grand Prix took place from July 30 to October 1, 2022.

Final standings
Red Stars		Blue Stars	
Tam Nakano	16	Giulia	16
Himeka	15	Mirai	15
Maika	15	Mayu Iwatani	15
Risa Sera	15	Suzu Suzuki	15
AZM	14	Hazuki	14
Utami Hayashishita	14	Saya Kamitani	14
Koguma	14	Starlight Kid	14
Syuri	14	Natsupoi	12
Saki Kashima	12	Momo Watanabe	12
Saki	10	Ami Sourei	11
Mai Sakurai	9	Mina Shirakawa	10
Momo Kohgo	4	Saya Iida	4
Unagi Sayaka	4	Hanan	4

Red Stars	Syuri	Nakano	Hayashishita	AZM	Koguma	Maika	Himeka	Kohgo	Sayaka	Kashima	Sakurai	Sera	Saki
Syuri	—N/a	Syuri (14:53)	Hayashishita (14:56)	Syuri (9:31)	Koguma (8:20)	Maika (14:28)	Syuri (14:48)	Syuri (6:31)	Syuri (9:51)	Kashima (9:28)	Syuri (6:53)	Sera (12:11)	Syuri (11:52)
Nakano	Syuri (14:53)	—N/a	Hayashishita (9:03)	AZM (7:15)	Nakano (5:56)	Nakano (8:32)	Nakano (11:50)	Nakano (7:21)	Nakano (10:32)	Kashima (6:18)	Nakano (9:15)	Nakano (12:38)	Nakano (7:36)
Hayashishita	Hayashishita (14:56)	Hayashishita (9:03)	—N/a	AZM (6:55)	Koguma (6:01)	Maika (14:11)	Himeka (10:52)	Hayashishita (5:38)	Hayashishita (11:04)	Kashima (6:53)	Hayashishita (4:22)	Hayashishita (10:26)	Hayashishita (11:28)
AZM	Syuri (9:31)	AZM (7:15)	AZM (6:55)	—N/a	Koguma (4:51)	Maika (6:54)	AZM (8:17)	AZM (6:41)	AZM (6:53)	Kashima (0:44)	AZM (6:56)	Sera (5:45)	AZM (7:14)
Koguma	Koguma (8:20)	Nakano (5:56)	Koguma (6:01)	Koguma (4:51)	—N/a	Maika (8:44)	Himeka (7:54)	Koguma (6:27)	Koguma (6:15)	Koguma (7:16)	Koguma (6:37)	Sera (8:15)	Saki (5:59)
Maika	Maika (14:28)	Nakano (8:32)	Maika (14:11)	Maika (6:54)	Maika (8:44)	—N/a	Draw (9:57)	Kohgo (5:27)	Maika (6:50)	Kashima (10:18)	Maika (6:58)	Sera (8:19)	Maika (12:35)
Himeka	Syuri (14:48)	Nakano (11:50)	Himeka (10:52)	AZM (8:17)	Himeka (7:54)	Draw (9:57)	—N/a	Himeka (5:40)	Himeka (9:03)	Himeka (4:25)	Sakurai (8:13)	Himeka (7:06)	Himeka (6:13)
Kohgo	Syuri (6:31)	Nakano (7:21)	Hayashishita (5:38)	AZM (6:41)	Koguma (6:27)	Kohgo (5:27)	Himeka (5:40)	—N/a	Sayaka (5:24)	Kohgo (5:36)	Sakurai (8:14)	Sera (7:25)	Saki (6:23)
Sayaka	Syuri (9:51)	Nakano (10:32)	Hayashishita (11:04)	AZM (6:53)	Koguma (6:15)	Maika (6:50)	Himeka (9:03)	Sayaka (5:24)	—N/a	Sayaka (6:02)	Sakurai (5:29)	Sera (6:01)	Saki (9:07)
Kashima	Kashima (9:28)	Kashima (6:18)	Kashima (6:53)	Kashima (0:44)	Koguma (7:16)	Kashima (10:18)	Himeka (4:25)	Kohgo (5:36)	Sayaka (6:02)	—N/a	Sakurai (3:50)	Kashima (6:49)	Saki (6:35)
Sakurai	Syuri (6:53)	Nakano (9:15)	Hayashishita (4:22)	AZM (6:56)	Koguma (6:37)	Maika (6:50)	Sakurai (8:13)	Sakurai (8:14)	Sakurai (5:29)	Sakurai (3:50)	—N/a	Draw (7:01)	Saki (6:04)
Sera	Sera (12:11)	Nakano (12:38)	Hayashishita (10:26)	Sera (5:45)	Sera (8:15)	Sera (8:19)	Himeka (7:06)	Sera (7:25)	Sera (6:01)	Kashima (6:49)	Draw (7:01)	—N/a	Sera (8:13)
Saki	Syuri (11:52)	Nakano (7:36)	Hayashishita (11:28)	AZM (7:14)	Saki (5:59)	Maika (12:35)	Himeka (6:13)	Saki (6:23)	Saki (9:07)	Saki (6:35)	Saki (6:04)	Sera (8:13)	—N/a
Blue Stars	Iwatani	Giulia	Kamitani	Kid	Watanabe	Hazuki	Iida	Natsupoi	Shirakawa	Hanan	Mirai	Sourei	Suzuki
Iwatani	—N/a	Draw (15:00)	Kamitani (9:26)	Iwatani (13:09)	Watanabe (11:32)	Iwatani (10:20)	Iwatani (5:04)	Natsupoi (7:21)	Iwatani (4:56)	Iwatani (9:33)	Mirai (12:51)	Iwatani (8:10)	Iwatani (10:52)
Giulia	Draw (15:00)	—N/a	Giulia (14:49)	Giulia (11:32)	Watanabe (11:21)	Hazuki (11:54)	Giulia (7:58)	Giulia (10:56)	Giulia (8:46)	Giulia (8:58)	Mirai (12:10)	Giulia (12:20)	Draw (15:00)
Kamitani	Kamitani (9:26)	Giulia (14:49)	—N/a	Kid (9:45)	Kamitani (12:00)	Kamitani (12:47)	Kamitani (8:10)	Kamitani (9:02)	Shirakawa (13:08)	Kamitani (8:37)	Draw (15:00)	Draw (8:21)	Suzuki (11:40)
Kid	Iwatani (13:09)	Giulia (11:32)	Kid (9:45)	—N/a	Watanabe (10:53)	Hazuki (11:15)	Kid (7:19)	Kid (13:26)	Kid (9:27)	Kid (7:19)	Kid (10:24)	Kid (7:02)	Suzuki (14:11)
Watanabe	Watanabe (11:32)	Watanabe (11:21)	Kamitani (12:00)	Watanabe (10:53)	—N/a	Watanabe (10:34)	Iida (7:36)	Watanabe (10:05)	Shirakawa (10:42)	Watanabe (7:41)	Mirai (11:25)	Sourei (9:07)	Suzuki (13:27)
Hazuki	Iwatani (10:20)	Hazuki (11:54)	Kamitani (12:47)	Hazuki (11:15)	Watanabe (10:34)	—N/a	Iida (7:48)	Hazuki (10:55)	Hazuki (10:39)	Hazuki (6:46)	Hazuki (10:29)	Sourei (10:36)	Hazuki (9:52)
Iida	Iwatani (5:04)	Giulia (7:58)	Kamitani (8:10)	Kid (7:19)	Iida (7:36)	Iida (7:48)	—N/a	Natsupoi (8:49)	Shirakawa (4:50)	Hanan (6:29)	Mirai (6:57)	Sourei (5:56)	Suzuki (6:56)
Natsupoi	Natsupoi (7:21)	Giulia (10:56)	Kamitani (9:02)	Kid (13:26)	Watanabe (10:05)	Hazuki (10:55)	Natsupoi (8:49)	—N/a	Shirakawa (7:50)	Natsupoi (6:08)	Natsupoi (10:41)	Natsupoi (10:39)	Natsupoi (10:11)
Shirakawa	Iwatani (4:56)	Giulia (8:46)	Shirakawa (13:08)	Kid (9:27)	Shirakawa (10:42)	Hazuki (10:39)	Shirakawa (4:50)	Shirakawa (7:50)	—N/a	Hanan (6:40)	Mirai (10:35)	Shirakawa (10:42)	Suzuki (9:25)
Hanan	Iwatani (9:33)	Giulia (8:58)	Kamitani (8:37)	Kid (7:19)	Watanabe (7:41)	Hazuki (6:46)	Hanan (6:29)	Natsupoi (6:08)	Hanan (6:40)	—N/a	Mirai (7:51)	Sourei (6:17)	Suzuki (7:29)
Mirai	Mirai (12:51)	Mirai (12:10)	Draw (15:00)	Kid (10:24)	Mirai (11:25)	Hazuki (10:29)	Mirai (6:57)	Natsupoi (10:41)	Mirai (10:35)	Mirai (7:51)	—N/a	Sourei (10:28)	Mirai (13:49)
Sourei	Iwatani (8:10)	Giulia (12:20)	Draw (8:21)	Kid (7:02)	Sourei (9:07)	Sourei (10:36)	Sourei (5:56)	Natsupoi (10:39)	Shirakawa (10:42)	Sourei (6:17)	Sourei (10:28)	—N/a	Suzuki (10:31)
Suzuki	Iwatani (10:52)	Draw (15:00)	Suzuki (11:40)	Suzuki (14:11)	Suzuki (13:27)	Hazuki (9:52)	Suzuki (6:56)	Natsupoi (10:11)	Suzuki (9:25)	Suzuki (7:29)	Mirai (13:49)	Suzuki (10:31)	—N/a

Final; October 1
Red	Tam Nakano	Pin
Blue	Giulia	25:37

== 2023 ==
2023
Tournament information
- Sport: Professional wrestling
- Location: Japan
- Dates: July 23, 2023–September 30, 2023
- Tournament format: Two-block round-robin
- Host: World Wonder Ring Stardom
- Participants: 20

Final positions
- Champions: Suzu Suzuki
- Runner-up: Maika

Tournament statistics
- Matches played: 73

The 2023 5 Star Grand Prix took place from July 23 to September 30, 2023.

Final standings
Red Stars		Blue Stars	
Suzu Suzuki	12	Maika	12
Natsuko Tora	12	Giulia	11
Tam Nakano	11	Momo Watanabe	10
Syuri	11	Saori Anou	10
Mayu Iwatani	11	Mirai	10
Natsupoi	11	Mina Shirakawa	9
Hazuki	10	Utami Hayashishita (Note: Hayashishita sustained an injury somewhere between September 18 and 20, therefore had to withdraw from the rest of the competition.)	8
Ami Sourei	8	AZM	8
Starlight Kid	4	Mariah May	6
Saya Kamitani (Note: Kamitani sustained an elbow injury on the first night of the tournament from July 23, therefore had to withdraw from the rest of the competition.)	0	Hanan	6

Tournament overview
Red Stars	Sourei	Tora	Hazuki	Natsupoi	Kid	Suzuki	Syuri	Kamitani	Iwatani	Nakano
Sourei	—N/a	Tora (4:48)	Hazuki (14:02)	Sourei (10:04)	Sourei (11:56)	Suzuki (11:29)	Sourei (9:14)	Sourei w/o	Iwatani (10:32)	Nakano (10:02)
Tora	Tora (4:48)	—N/a	Hazuki (9:41)	Tora (12:24)	Kid (7:31)	Suzuki (8:11)	Tora (12:59)	Tora w/o	Tora (13:07)	Tora (11:16)
Hazuki	Hazuki (14:02)	Hazuki (9:41)	—N/a	Hazuki (12:29)	Hazuki (10:19)	Suzuki (11:35)	Syuri (11:39)	Hazuki w/o	Iwatani (13:20)	Nakano (12:35)
Natsupoi	Sourei (10:04)	Tora (12:24)	Hazuki (12:29)	—N/a	Natsupoi (7:23)	Natsupoi (9:06)	Draw (15:00)	Natsupoi w/o	Natsupoi (11:08)	Natsupoi (10:54)
Kid	Sourei (11:56)	Kid (7:31)	Hazuki (10:19)	Natsupoi (7:23)	—N/a	Suzuki (12:26)	Syuri (10:56)	Kid w/o	Iwatani w/o	Nakano (8:28)
Suzuki	Suzuki (11:29)	Suzuki (8:11)	Suzuki (11:35)	Natsupoi (9:06)	Suzuki (12:26)	—N/a	Syuri (11:20)	Suzuki w/o	Iwatani (12:51)	Suzuki (13:24)
Syuri	Sourei (9:14)	Tora (12:59)	Syuri (11:39)	Draw (15:00)	Syuri (10:56)	Syuri (11:20)	—N/a	Syuri w/o	Syuri (12:30)	Nakano (13:20)
Kamitani	Sourei w/o	Tora w/o	Hazuki w/o	Natsupoi w/o	Kid w/o	Suzuki w/o	Syuri w/o	—N/a	Iwatani w/o	Nakano (8:15)
Iwatani	Iwatani (10:32)	Tora (13:07)	Iwatani (13:20)	Natsupoi (11:08)	Iwatani w/o	Iwatani (12:51)	Syuri (12:30)	Iwatani w/o	—N/a	Draw (15:00)
Nakano	Nakano (10:02)	Tora (11:16)	Nakano (12:35)	Natsupoi (10:54)	Nakano (8:28)	Suzuki (13:24)	Nakano (13:20)	Nakano (8:15)	Draw (15:00)	—N/a
Blue Stars	Hayashishita	Hanan	May	Giulia	Shirakawa	AZM	Mirai	Watanabe	Anou	Maika
Hayashishita	—N/a	Hanan w/o	Hayashishita (9:41)	Giulia w/o	Hayashishita (12:48)	AZM (10:10)	Mirai w/o	Hayashishita (9:26)	Hayashishita (13:06)	Maika (13:50)
Hanan	Hanan w/o	—N/a	Hanan (8:47)	Giulia (7:59)	Shirakawa (10:15)	Hanan (11:02)	Mirai (9:04)	Watanabe (10:52)	Anou (7:09)	Maika (3:50)
May	Hayashishita (9:41)	Hanan (8:47)	—N/a	Giulia (12:04)	May (11:47)	May (6:51)	Mirai (12:53)	May (11:53)	Anou (9:22)	Maika (8:55)
Giulia	Giulia w/o	Giulia (7:59)	Giulia (12:04)	—N/a	Shirakawa (12:33)	AZM (0:55)	Mirai (12:17)	Giulia (10:28)	Draw (15:00)	Giulia (12:12)
Shirakawa	Hayashishita (12:48)	Shirakawa (10:15)	May (11:47)	Shirakawa (12:33)	—N/a	AZM (10:53)	Shirakawa (14:47)	Shirakawa (14:07)	Anou (11:07)	Draw (15:00)
AZM	AZM (10:10)	Hanan (11:02)	May (6:51)	AZM (0:55)	AZM (10:53)	—N/a	Mirai (7:55)	Watanabe (8:13)	AZM (8:18)	Maika (8:43)
Mirai	Mirai w/o	Mirai (9:04)	Mirai (12:53)	Mirai (12:17)	Shirakawa (14:47)	Mirai (7:55)	—N/a	Watanabe (9:56)	Anou (12:42)	Maika (11:00)
Watanabe	Hayashishita (9:26)	Watanabe (10:52)	May (11:53)	Giulia (10:28)	Shirakawa (14:07)	Watanabe (8:13)	Watanabe (9:56)	—N/a	Watanabe (9:20)	Watanabe (10:02)
Anou	Hayashishita (13:06)	Anou (7:09)	Anou (9:22)	Draw (15:00)	Anou (11:07)	AZM (8:18)	Anou (12:42)	Watanabe (9:20)	—N/a	Draw (15:00)
Maika	Maika (13:50)	Maika (3:50)	Maika (8:55)	Giulia (12:12)	Draw (15:00)	Maika (8:43)	Maika (11:00)	Watanabe (10:02)	Draw (15:00)	—N/a

Final; September 30
Red	Suzu Suzuki	Pin
Blue	Maika	14:03

== 2024 ==
2024
Tournament information
- Sport: Professional wrestling
- Location: Japan
- Dates: August 10, 2024–August 31, 2024
- Tournament format: Four-block round-robin
- Host: World Wonder Ring Stardom
- Participants: 28

Final positions
- Champions: Maika
- Runner-up: Saya Kamitani

Tournament statistics
- Matches played: 93

The 2024 5 Star Grand Prix took place from August 10 to August 31, 2024.

Final standings
Blue Stars A		Blue Stars B		Red Stars A		Red Stars B	
Syuri	8	Saya Kamitani	8	Maika	12	Mayu Iwatani	10
Starlight Kid	8	Suzu Suzuki	7	Natsupoi	9	AZM	8
Saori Anou	7	Hanan	7	Hazuki	7	Tomoka Inaba	8
Anna Jay	6	Risa Sera	6	Konami	6	Mei Seira	8
Koguma	6	Saki Kashima	6	Manami	5	Momo Watanabe	4
Xena	4	Ranna Yagami	4	Ruaka	3	Saya Iida	4
Miyu Amasaki	3	Thekla	4	Yuna Mizumori	0	Tam Nakano	0

Blue Stars A	Anou	Syuri	Kid	Xena	Koguma	Jay	Amasaki
Anou	—N/a	Anou (12:17)	Draw (15:00)	Anou (13:21)	Koguma (3:16)	Jay (5:31)	Anou (10:20)
Syuri	Anou (12:17)	—N/a	Syuri (11:08)	Syuri (12:00)	Koguma (10:33)	Syuri (5:35)	Syuri (7:07)
Kid	Draw (15:00)	Syuri (11:08)	—N/a	Kid (10:31)	Kid (13:35)	Kid (9:49)	Draw (15:00)
Xena	Anou (13:21)	Syuri (12:00)	Kid (10:31)	—N/a	Xena (9:04)	Xena (10:03)	Amasaki (2:15)
Koguma	Koguma (3:16)	Koguma (10:33)	Kid (13:35)	Xena (9:04)	—N/a	Jay (6:41)	Koguma (0:49)
Jay	Jay (5:31)	Syuri (5:35)	Kid (9:49)	Xena (10:03)	Jay (6:41)	—N/a	Jay (8:02)
Amasaki	Anou (10:20)	Syuri (7:07)	Draw (15:00)	Amasaki (2:15)	Koguma (0:49)	Jay (8:02)	—N/a

Blue Stars B	Suzuki	Kamitani	Hanan	Yagami	Kashima	Thekla	Sera
Suzuki	—N/a	Kamitani (10:38)	Draw (8:56)	Suzuki (5:06)	Suzuki (4:58)	Suzuki (11:09)	Sera (13:49)
Kamitani	Kamitani (10:38)	—N/a	Hanan (9:55)	Kamitani (8:13)	Kashima (6:45)	Kamitani (12:33)	Kamitani (10:48)
Hanan	Draw (8:56)	Hanan (9:55)	—N/a	Yagami (6:50)	Kashima (0:20)	Hanan (9:42)	Hanan (13:32)
Yagami	Suzuki (5:06)	Kamitani (8:13)	Yagami (6:50)	—N/a	Yagami (0:30)	Thekla (3:40)	Sera (8:46)
Kashima	Suzuki (4:58)	Kashima (6:45)	Kashima (0:20)	Yagami (0:30)	—N/a	Kashima (3:43)	Sera (9:50)
Thekla	Suzuki (11:09)	Kamitani (12:33)	Hanan (9:42)	Thekla (3:40)	Kashima (3:43)	—N/a	Thekla (7:44)
Sera	Sera (13:49)	Kamitani (10:48)	Hanan (13:32)	Sera (8:46)	Sera (9:50)	Thekla (7:44)	—N/a

Red Stars A	Maika	Hazuki	Ruaka	Konami	Manami	Natsupoi	Mizumori
Maika	—N/a	Maika (14:39)	Maika (7:42)	Maika (7:38)	Maika (8:57)	Maika (13:11)	Maika (9:06)
Hazuki	Maika (14:39)	—N/a	Hazuki (9:19)	Konami (9:36)	Hazuki (9:08)	Natsupoi (15:00)	Hazuki (10:21)
Ruaka	Maika (7:42)	Hazuki (9:19)	—N/a	Konami (6:26)	Draw (15:00)	Natsupoi (8:58)	Ruaka (7:43)
Konami	Maika (7:38)	Konami (9:36)	Konami (6:26)	—N/a	Manami (9:57)	Natsupoi (7:39)	Konami (6:33)
Manami	Maika (8:57)	Hazuki (9:08)	Draw (15:00)	Manami (9:57)	—N/a	Natsupoi (12:56)	Manami (5:06)
Natsupoi	Maika (13:11)	Draw (15:00)	Natsupoi (8:58)	Natsupoi (7:39)	Natsupoi (12:56)	—N/a	Natsupoi (11:33)
Mizumori	Maika (9:06)	Hazuki (10:21)	Ruaka (7:43)	Konami (6:33)	Manami (5:06)	Natsupoi (11:33)	—N/a

Red Stars B	Iwatani	Nakano	Watanabe	AZM	Seira	Iida	Inaba
Iwatani	—N/a	Iwatani (13:45)	Iwatani (12:55)	AZM (9:34)	Iwatani (10:37)	Iwatani (12:41)	Iwatani (4:23)
Nakano	Iwatani (13:45)	—N/a	Watanabe (13:21)	AZM (9:43)	Seira (12:19)	Iida (13:52)	Inaba (11:36)
Watanabe	Iwatani (12:55)	Watanabe (13:21)	—N/a	AZM (11:24)	Seira (10:36)	Watanabe (11:12)	Inaba (12:01)
AZM	AZM (9:34)	AZM (9:43)	AZM (11:24)	—N/a	Draw (15:00)	Iida (7:59)	Draw (12:47)
Seira	Iwatani (10:37)	Seira (12:19)	Seira (10:36)	Draw (15:00)	—N/a	Seira (7:26)	Draw (15:00)
Iida	Iwatani (12:41)	Iida (13:52)	Watanabe (11:12)	Iida (7:59)	Seira (7:26)	—N/a	Inaba (7:18)
Inaba	Iwatani (4:23)	Inaba (11:36)	Inaba (12:01)	Draw (12:47)	Draw (15:00)	Inaba (7:18)	—N/a

Quarterfinals (August 28, 2024)
Blue A1	Syuri	13:02
Blue B2	Hanan	Pin
Blue B1	Saya Kamitani	Pin
Blue A2	Starlight Kid	15:53
Red A1	Maika	Pin
Red B2	AZM	11:11
Red B1	Mayu Iwatani	Pin
Red A2	Natsupoi	11:28

Semifinals (August 31, 2024)
Hanan	10:22
Saya Kamitani	Pin
Maika	Pin
Mayu Iwatani	11:44

Final (August 31, 2024)
Saya Kamitani	27:23
Maika	Pin

== 2025 ==
2025
Tournament information
- Sport: Professional wrestling
- Location: Japan
- Dates: July 23, 2025–August 23, 2025
- Tournament format: Four-block round-robin
- Host: World Wonder Ring Stardom
- Participants: 32

Final positions
- Champions: Momo Watanabe
- Runner-up: AZM

Tournament statistics
- Matches played: 124

The 2025 5 Star Grand Prix took place from July 23 to August 23, 2025.

Current standings
Blue Stars A		Blue Stars B		Red Stars A		Red Stars B	
Saori Anou	11	Sareee	11	Saya Kamitani	12	Natsupoi	10
Ami Sohrei	10	Suzu Suzuki	10	Bea Priestley	10	AZM	9
Bozilla	10	Momo Watanabe	8	Hanan	9	Rina	9
Saya Iida	8	Hanako	7	Mei Seira	7	Tomoka Inaba	8
Ruaka	7	Ranna Yagami	6	Azusa Inaba	6	Starlight Kid	8
Miyu Amasaki	6	Hina	6	Lady C	4	Natsuko Tora	8
Aya Sakura	4	Konami	6	Yuna Mizumori	4	Sayaka Kurara	4
Yuria Hime	0	Momo Kohgo	2	Waka Tsukiyama	4	Rian	0

Blue Stars A	Iida	Amasaki	Anou	Sakura	Sohrei	Bozilla	Ruaka	Hime
Iida	—N/a	Iida (11:36)	Anou (10:50)	Iida (8:03)	Sohrei (12:00)	Bozilla (10:51)	Iida (5:05)	Iida (7:42)
Amasaki	Iida (11:36)	—N/a	Anou (10:03)	Sakura (3:59)	Amasaki (7:47)	Bozilla (5:34)	Amasaki (3:22)	Amasaki (2:42)
Anou	Anou (10:50)	Anou (10:03)	—N/a	Anou (10:04)	Sohrei (12:27)	Draw (15:00)	Anou (7:19)	Anou (6:41)
Sakura	Iida (8:03)	Sakura (3:59)	Anou (10:04)	—N/a	Sohrei (4:01)	Bozilla (10:15)	Ruaka (6:21)	Sakura (5:41)
Sohrei	Sohrei (12:00)	Amasaki (7:47)	Sohrei (12:27)	Sohrei (4:01)	—N/a	Sohrei (12:24)	Ruaka (10:10)	Sohrei (8:53)
Bozilla	Bozilla (10:51)	Bozilla (5:34)	Draw (15:00)	Bozilla (10:15)	Sohrei (12:24)	—N/a	Draw (8:42)	Bozilla (4:15)
Ruaka	Iida (5:05)	Amasaki (3:22)	Anou (7:19)	Ruaka (6:21)	Ruaka (10:10)	Draw (8:42)	—N/a	Ruaka (5:34)
Hime	Iida (7:42)	Amasaki (2:42)	Anou (6:41)	Sakura (5:41)	Sohrei (8:53)	Bozilla (4:15)	Ruaka (5:34)	—N/a

Blue Stars B	Sareee	Suzuki	Watanabe	Hina	Konami	Hanako	Kohgo	Yagami
Sareee	—N/a	Draw (15:00)	Sareee (12:29)	Sareee (13:03)	Konami (13:24)	Sareee (11:39)	Sareee (6:28)	Sareee (10:36)
Suzuki	Draw (15:00)	—N/a	Watanabe (13:12)	Suzuki (6:14)	Suzuki (10:00)	Draw (11:59)	Suzuki (6:51)	Suzuki (7:28)
Watanabe	Sareee (12:29)	Watanabe (13:12)	—N/a	Hina (9:17)	Watanabe (10:28)	Hanako (14:25)	Watanabe (2:51)	Watanabe (7:13)
Hina	Sareee (13:03)	Suzuki (6:14)	Hina (9:17)	—N/a	Hina (7:35)	Hina (7:53)	Kohgo (7:29)	Yagami (10:13)
Konami	Konami (13:24)	Suzuki (10:00)	Watanabe (10:28)	Hina (7:35)	—N/a	Konami (12:15)	Konami (7:42)	Yagami (7:09)
Hanako	Sareee (11:39)	Draw (11:59)	Hanako (14:25)	Hina (7:53)	Konami (12:15)	—N/a	Hanako (8:41)	Hanako (6:55)
Kohgo	Sareee (6:28)	Suzuki (6:51)	Watanabe (2:51)	Kohgo (7:29)	Konami (7:42)	Hanako (8:41)	—N/a	Yagami (6:44)
Yagami	Sareee (10:36)	Suzuki (7:28)	Watanabe (7:13)	Yagami (10:13)	Yagami (7:09)	Hanako (6:55)	Yagami (6:44)	—N/a

Red Stars A	Kamitani	Hanan	Seira	Mizumori	Lady C	Tsukiyama	Inaba	Priestley
Kamitani	—N/a	Kamitani (11:54)	Kamitani (11:48)	Kamitani (8:42)	Kamitani (7:25)	Kamitani (0:40)	Kamitani (8:01)	Priestley (13:05)
Hanan	Kamitani (11:54)	—N/a	Draw (15:00)	Hanan (6:44)	Hanan (8:35)	Hanan (1:12)	Inaba (5:37)	Hanan (12:20)
Seira	Kamitani (11:48)	Draw (15:00)	—N/a	Mizumori (9:28)	Seira (7:17)	Seira (0:28)	Inaba (9:38)	Seira (6:22)
Mizumori	Kamitani (8:42)	Hanan (6:44)	Mizumori (9:28)	—N/a	Lady C (6:56)	Mizumori (8:51)	Inaba (2:12)	Priestley (7:27)
Lady C	Kamitani (7:25)	Hanan (8:35)	Seira (7:17)	Lady C (6:56)	—N/a	Tsukiyama (6:39)	Lady C (8:24)	Priestley (8:36)
Tsukiyama	Kamitani (0:40)	Hanan (1:12)	Seira (0:28)	Mizumori (8:51)	Tsukiyama (6:39)	—N/a	Tsukiyama (0:48)	Priestley (4:53)
Inaba	Kamitani (8:01)	Inaba (5:37)	Inaba (9:38)	Inaba (2:12)	Lady C (8:24)	Tsukiyama (0:48)	—N/a	Priestley (10:26)
Priestley	Priestley (13:05)	Hanan (12:20)	Seira (6:22)	Priestley (7:27)	Priestley (8:36)	Priestley (4:53)	Priestley (10:26)	—N/a

Red Stars B	Kid	AZM	Natsupoi	Kurara	Inaba	Rian	Tora	Rina
Kid	—N/a	Draw (15:00)	Natsupoi (10:39)	Kid (11:21)	Inaba (14:13)	Kid (9:20)	Kid (13:48)	Draw (15:00)
AZM	Draw (15:00)	—N/a	AZM (2:35)	Kurara (9:06)	AZM (12:32)	AZM (10:41)	Tora (4:18)	AZM (11:50)
Natsupoi	Natsupoi (10:39)	AZM (2:35)	—N/a	Natsupoi (11:56)	Natsupoi (9:12)	Natsupoi (7:35)	Tora (10:05)	Natsupoi (12:02)
Kurara	Kid (11:21)	Kurara (9:06)	Natsupoi (11:56)	—N/a	Inaba (11:30)	Kurara (8:05)	Tora (9:46)	Rina (11:06)
Inaba	Inaba (14:13)	AZM (12:32)	Natsupoi (9:12)	Inaba (11:30)	—N/a	Inaba (7:43)	Inaba (12:46)	Rina (13:24)
Rian	Kid (9:20)	AZM (10:41)	Natsupoi (7:35)	Kurara (8:05)	Inaba (7:43)	—N/a	Tora (5:38)	Rina (6:35)
Tora	Kid (13:48)	Tora (4:18)	Tora (10:05)	Tora (9:46)	Inaba (12:46)	Tora (5:38)	—N/a	Rina (9:58)
Rina	Draw (15:00)	AZM (11:50)	Natsupoi (12:02)	Rina (11:06)	Rina (13:24)	Rina (6:35)	Rina (9:58)	—N/a

Playoffs (August 20, 2025)
Blue B2	Suzu Suzuki	Pin
Blue A3	Bozilla	11:35
Blue B3	Momo Watanabe	Pin
Blue A2	Ami Sohrei	11:40
Red B2	AZM	Sub
Red A3	Hanan	10:18
Red B3	Rina	Pin
Red A2	Bea Priestley	11:25

Quarterfinals (August 20, 2025)
Blue A1	Saori Anou	Pin
Blue B2	Suzu Suzuki	11:11
Blue B1	Sareee	15:13
Blue B3	Momo Watanabe	Pin
Red A1	Saya Kamitani	12:27
Red B2	AZM	Pin
Red B1	Natsupoi	13:23
Red B3	Rina	Sub

Semifinals (August 23, 2025)
Blue A1	Saori Anou	14:02
Blue B3	Momo Watanabe	Pin
Red B2	AZM	Pin
Red B3	Rina	15:33

Final (August 23, 2025)
Blue B3	Momo Watanabe	Pin
Red B2	AZM	21:11

== 2026 ==
2026
Tournament information
- Sport: Professional wrestling
- Location: Japan
- Dates: July 23, 2026–August 23, 2026
- Tournament format: Four-block round-robin
- Host: World Wonder Ring Stardom
- Participants: 32

Final positions
- Champions: Rina
- Runner-up: Starlight Kid

Tournament statistics
- Matches played: 124

The 2026 5 Star Grand Prix took place from July 23 to August 23, 2026.

Current standings
Blue Stars A		Blue Stars B		Red Stars A		Red Stars B	
Suzu Suzuki	13	Ami Sohrei	10	Maika	11	Konami	10
Hanako	9	Hanan	9	Rina	9	Saya Iida	9
Ruaka	8	Starlight Kid	9	AZM	9	Rina Yamashita	9
Julia Hart	8	Momo Watanabe	8	Itsuki Aoki	8	Maki Itoh	8
Miyu Amasaki	6	Saya Kamitani	8	Natsuko Tora	8	Utami Hayashishita	7
Hina	6	Yuna Mizumori	6	Tomoka Inaba	6	Mei Seira	7
Aya Sakura	4	Koguma	6	Sayaka Kurara	4	Azusa Inaba	4
Rian	2	Kikyo Furusawa	0	Akira Kurogane	1	Lady C	2

Blue Stars A	Sakura	Hanako	Rian	Hina	Amasaki	Ruaka	Hart	Suzuki
Sakura	—N/a	Sakura (13:36)	Rian (12:55)	Hina (11:27)	Amasaki (8:58)	Sakura (9:59)	Hart (8:02)	Suzuki (11:55)
Hanako	Sakura (13:36)	—N/a	Hanako (9:07)	Hanako (14:08)	Hanako (14:22)	Draw (15:00)	Hanako (8:30)	Suzuki (11:06)
Rian	Rian (12:55)	Hanako (9:07)	—N/a	Hina (9:49)	Amasaki (8:21)	Ruaka (5:34)	Hart (5:31)	Suzuki (4:21)
Hina	Hina (11:27)	Hanako (14:08)	Hina (9:49)	—N/a	Amasaki (12:23)	Hina (11:31)	Hart (8:04)	Suzuki (10:35)
Amasaki	Amasaki (8:58)	Hanako (14:22)	Amasaki (8:21)	Amasaki (12:23)	—N/a	Ruaka (4:06)	Hart (7:05)	Suzuki (7:05)
Ruaka	Sakura (9:59)	Draw (15:00)	Ruaka (5:34)	Hina (11:31)	Ruaka (4:06)	—N/a	Ruaka (7:35)	Draw (8:05)
Hart	Hart (8:02)	Hanako (8:30)	Hart (5:31)	Hart (8:04)	Hart (7:05)	Ruaka (7:35)	—N/a	Suzuki (5:06)
Suzuki	Suzuki (11:55)	Suzuki (11:06)	Suzuki (4:21)	Suzuki (10:35)	Suzuki (7:05)	Draw (8:05)	Suzuki (5:06)	—N/a

Blue Stars B	Kid	Hanan	Mizumori	Koguma	Sohrei	Kamitani	Watanabe	Furusawa
Kid	—N/a	Hanan (11:28)	Kid (10:55)	Kid (9:49)	Sohrei (11:36)	Draw (15:00)	Kid (10:11)	Kid (7:53)
Hanan	Hanan (11:28)	—N/a	Mizumori (5:55)	Hanan (8:34)	Sohrei (11:16)	Hanan (9:56)	Draw (15:00)	Hanan (7:34)
Mizumori	Kid (10:55)	Mizumori (5:55)	—N/a	Mizumori (7:50)	Sohrei (7:29)	Kamitani (9:29)	Watanabe (9:41)	Mizumori (7:59)
Koguma	Kid (9:49)	Hanan (8:34)	Mizumori (7:50)	—N/a	Koguma (7:08)	Kamitani (7:24)	Koguma (12:51)	Koguma (7:34)
Sohrei	Sohrei (11:36)	Sohrei (11:16)	Sohrei (7:29)	Koguma (7:08)	—N/a	Sohrei (14:02)	Watanabe (13:34)	Sohrei (7:56)
Kamitani	Draw (15:00)	Hanan (9:56)	Kamitani (9:29)	Kamitani (7:24)	Sohrei (14:02)	—N/a	Draw (15:00)	Kamitani (7:15)
Watanabe	Kid (10:11)	Draw (15:00)	Watanabe (9:41)	Koguma (12:51)	Watanabe (13:34)	Draw (15:00)	—N/a	Watanabe (7:44)
Furusawa	Kid (7:53)	Hanan (7:34)	Mizumori (7:59)	Koguma (7:34)	Sohrei (7:56)	Kamitani (7:15)	Watanabe (7:44)	—N/a

Red Stars A	Maika	Kurara	Rina	Inaba	Aoki	AZM	Tora	Kurogane
Maika	—N/a	Maika (6:01)	Draw (15:00)	Maika (8:03)	Maika (11:40)	Maika (13:03)	Tora (11:08)	Maika (7:00)
Kurara	Maika (6:01)	—N/a	Kurara (13:54)	Inaba (4:49)	Aoki (10:04)	AZM (3:02)	Tora (7:28)	Kurara (6:00)
Rina	Draw (15:00)	Kurara (13:54)	—N/a	Rina (5:10)	Rina (14:36)	Rina (14:07)	Tora (10:54)	Rina (9:21)
Inaba	Maika (8:03)	Inaba (4:49)	Rina (5:10)	—N/a	Aoki (9:52)	AZM (9:05)	Inaba (8:48)	Inaba (6:57)
Aoki	Maika (11:40)	Aoki (10:04)	Rina (14:36)	Aoki (9:52)	—N/a	AZM (13:38)	Aoki (6:42)	Aoki (11:02)
AZM	Maika (13:03)	AZM (3:02)	Rina (14:07)	AZM (9:05)	AZM (13:38)	—N/a	Draw (9:42)	AZM (7:39)
Tora	Tora (11:08)	Tora (7:28)	Tora (10:54)	Inaba (8:48)	Aoki (6:42)	Draw (9:42)	—N/a	Draw (8:41)
Kurogane	Maika (7:00)	Kurara (6:00)	Rina (9:21)	Inaba (6:57)	Aoki (11:02)	AZM (7:39)	Draw (8:41)	—N/a

Red Stars B	Konami	Iida	Lady C	Inaba	Seira	Yamashita	Itoh	Hayashishita
Konami	—N/a	Iida (13:03)	Konami (8:29)	Konami (8:40)	Konami (11:22)	Yamashita (10:26)	Konami (13:24)	Konami (12:41)
Iida	Iida (13:03)	—N/a	Iida (11:30)	Iida (7:56)	Seira (10:27)	Draw (15:00)	Iida (12:57)	Hayashishita (13:45)
Lady C	Konami (8:29)	Iida (11:30)	—N/a	Lady C (8:38)	Seira (4:29)	Yamashita (7:03)	Itoh (8:03)	Hayashishita (11:08)
Inaba	Konami (8:40)	Iida (7:56)	Lady C (8:38)	—N/a	Draw (15:00)	Yamashita (8:56)	Draw (15:00)	Inaba (9:13)
Seira	Konami (11:22)	Seira (10:27)	Seira (4:29)	Draw (15:00)	—N/a	Seira (8:41)	Itoh (10:23)	Hayashishita (11:15)
Yamashita	Yamashita (10:26)	Draw (15:00)	Yamashita (7:03)	Yamashita (8:56)	Seira (8:41)	—N/a	Draw (12:44)	Draw (15:00)
Itoh	Konami (13:24)	Iida (12:57)	Itoh (8:03)	Draw (15:00)	Itoh (10:23)	Draw (12:44)	—N/a	Itoh (13:05)
Hayashishita	Konami (12:41)	Hayashishita (13:45)	Hayashishita (11:08)	Inaba (9:13)	Hayashishita (11:15)	Draw (15:00)	Itoh (13:05)	—N/a

Playoffs (August 18, 2026)
Blue B2	Hanan	11:27
Blue A3	Ruaka	pin
Blue A2	Hanako	13:58
Blue B3	Starlight Kid	sub
Red B2	Saya Iida	pin
Red A3	AZM	10:22
Red A2	Rina	pin
Red B3	Rina Yamashita	11:22

Quarterfinals (August 18, 2026)
Blue A1	Suzu Suzuki	pin
Blue A3	Ruaka	10:13
Blue B1	Ami Sohrei	12:16
Blue B3	Starlight Kid	pin
Red A1	Maika	pin
Red B2	Saya Iida	12:49
Red B1	Konami	17:17
Red A2	Rina	pin

Semifinals (August 23, 2026)
Blue A1	Suzu Suzuki	16:56
Blue B3	Starlight Kid	sub
Red A1	Maika	16:51
Red A2	Rina	sub

Final (August 23, 2026)
Blue B3	Starlight Kid	27:03
Red A2	Rina	pin

== 5★Star GP Awards ==
At the end of every tournament, the participants receives awards in different categories based on their performance during the tournament. The awards are similar to those that are presented at the Stardom Year-End Awards.

=== Active awards ===
==== Blue Stars Best Match Award ====
Year	Date	Match	Location
2020	September 19	Syuri vs. Utami Hayashishita	Tokyo, Japan
2021	September 25	Syuri vs. Takumi Iroha	Tokyo, Japan
2022	September 11	Saya Kamitani vs. Suzu Suzuki	Yokohama, Kanagawa, Japan
2023	September 30	Maika vs. Mirai	Yokohama, Kanagawa, Japan
2024	August 15; August 20	Saori Anou vs. Starlight Kid (Blue Stars A); Suzu Suzuki vs. Thekla (Blue Stars B)	Tokyo, Japan; Osaka, Japan
2025	August 6 July 27	Saori Anou vs. Bozilla (Blue Stars A); Sareee vs. Konami (Blue Stars B)	Tokyo, Japan; Ōta, Japan
2026	August 2 August 3	Hina vs. Hanako (Blue Stars A); Saya Kamitani vs. Momo Watanabe (Blue Stars B)	Tochigi, Japan; Tokyo, Japan

==== Fighting Spirit Award ====
Year	Wrestler
2012	Yoshiko
2013	Kyoko Kimura
2014	Koguma
2015	Queen Maya
2016	Mayu Iwatani
2017	Tam Nakano
2018	Momo Watanabe
2019	Jamie Hayter
2020	Maika
2021	Unagi Sayaka
2022	AZM
2023	Natsuko Tora
2024	AZM (2)
2025	Rina
2026	Saya Iida

==== Outstanding Performance Award ====
Year	Wrestler
2012	Act Yasukawa
2013	Yuhi
2014	Mayu Iwatani
2016	Toni Storm
2017	Viper
2018	Konami
2019	Tam Nakano
2020	Konami (2)
2021	AZM
2022	Saki Kashima
2023	Natsupoi
2024	Hanan
2025	Suzu Suzuki
2026	Ami Sohrei

==== Red Stars Best Match Award ====
Year	Date	Match	Location
2020	September 13	Giulia vs. Tam Nakano	Tokyo, Japan
2021	August 1	Giulia vs. Mayu Iwatani	Yokohama, Kanagawa, Japan
2022	October 1	Himeka vs. Maika	Tokyo, Japan
2023	September 23	Hazuki vs. Suzu Suzuki	Sendai, Miyagi, Japan
2024	August 23; August 15	Maika vs. Hazuki (Red Stars A); Mayu Iwatani vs. Momo Watanabe (Red Stars B)	Sendai, Miyagi, Japan; Tokyo, Japan
2025	August 16; August 2	Saya Kamitani vs. Mei Seira (Red Stars A); Natsuko Tora vs. Rina (Red Stars B)	Naka-ku, Yokohama; Sendai, Miyagi
2026	July 20; July 18	AZM vs. Maika (Red Stars A); Mei Seira vs. Rina Yamashita (Red Stars B)	Osaka, Japan; Ōta, Japan

==== Technique/Skill Award ====
Year	Wrestler
2012	Natsuki☆Taiyo
2013	Io Shirai
2014	Cheerleader Melissa
2015	La Rosa Negra
2016	Kay Lee Ray
2017	Io Shirai (2)
2018	Hazuki
2019	AZM
2020	AZM
2021	Starlight Kid
2022	Mirai
2023	AZM (3)
2024	Starlight Kid (2)
2025	Rina
2026	Ruaka

==== Finalist Award ====
Year	Wrestler
2012	Kyoko Kimura
2013	Alpha Female
2014	Yoshiko
2015	Hudson Envy
2016	Tessa Blanchard
2017	Yoko Bito
2018	Utami Hayashishita
2019	Konami
2020	Himeka
2021	Momo Watanabe
2022	Tam Nakano
2023	Maika
2024	Saya Kamitani
2025	AZM
2026	Starlight Kid

==== Best Match Award ====
In 2013, the award was named the Best Bout Award (ベストバウト賞, Besutobauto-shō), but in 2012, and since 2014, the award is known as the Best Match Award. Since 2020, the award was separated into two different sub-categories; the Blue Stars block and the Red Stars block. In 2025, it came back as a “Best Tournament Finals Match Award”.

Year	Date	Match	Location
2012	September 17	Nanae Takahashi vs. Yuzuki Aikawa	Tokyo, Japan
2013	September 23	Nanae Takahashi vs. Natsuki☆Taiyo	Tokyo, Japan
2014	August 24	Nanae Takahashi vs. Kairi Hojo	Tokyo, Japan
2015	August 23	Io Shirai vs. Mayu Iwatani	Tokyo, Japan
2016	September 3	Io Shirai vs. Kairi Hojo	Yokohama, Kanagawa, Japan
2017	September 18	Kagetsu vs. Mayu Iwatani	Tokyo, Japan
2018	September 8	Jungle Kyona vs. Kagetsu	Tokyo, Japan
2019	September 8	Jungle Kyona vs. Kagetsu	Tokyo, Japan
2025	August 23	Rina vs. AZM	Ōta, Tokyo
2026	August 18	Rina vs. Konami	Bunkyo, Tokyo

== See also ==
- Goddesses of Stardom Tag League
- Triangle Derby I
- Catch the Wave
- G1 Climax
- Japan Grand Prix
