= Stardom Rookie of the Year =

- Promotions: World Wonder Ring Stardom
- First event: 2011
- Signature matches: Time-limited singles matches

Stardom Rookie of the Year (スターダム新人王, Sutādamu shinjin-ō) is a tournament promoted by the Japanese professional wrestling promotion World Wonder Ring Stardom in which rookies with less than one year of in-ring experience evolve. The event has been held annually between 2011 and 2019 with a four-year break until 2023 and a three-year break until 2026. During time, the competition took place under single-elimination tournament rules or was decided by singles or gauntlet matches.

== List of winners ==
Year	Tournament		
Year	Winner	Runner-up	Ref
2011	Yoshiko	Arisa Hoshiki	
2012	Yuhi	Act Yasukawa	
2013	Takumi Iroha	Koguma	
2014	Hazuki	Kris Wolf; Momo Watanabe	
2015	Jungle Kyona	Hiromi Mimura	
2016	Arisu Nanase	Natsuko Tora	
2017	Shiki Shibusawa	Hanan	
2018	Utami Hayashishita	Rina; Hina; Natsumi	
2019	Saya Kamitani	Saya Iida	
2023	Yuzuki	Hanako	
2026	Ema Maishima	Kikyo Furusawa	

== 2011 ==
The inaugural edition of 2011 took place as a one-day single-elimination tournament on December 11.

Quarterfinals
Mayu Iwatani	Draw (Note: Despite the match ending in a time-limit draw, Iwatani advanced in the tournament under unknown circumstances.)
Eri Susa	10:00
Saki Kashima	7:59
Yoko Bito	Pin

Semifinals
Mayu Iwatani	3:28
Yoshiko	Pin
Arisa Hoshiki	Pin
Yoko Bito	6:46

Finals
Yoshiko	Pin
Arisa Hoshiki	12:35

== 2012 ==
The 2012 edition of the tournament took place on December 9 during the same year edition of the Goddesses of Stardom Tag League.

Semifinals
Yuhi	Pin
Kairi Hojo	7:07
Natsumi Showzuki	7:48
Act Yasukawa	Pin

Finals
Yuhi	Pin
Act Yasukawa	11:12

== 2013 ==
The 2013 edition of the tournament took place under a singles bout on December 8.

No.	Results	Stipulations	Times
1	Takumi Iroha defeated Koguma	Rookie of Stardom decision match	13:40

== 2014 ==
The 2014 edition of the tournament took place under a three-way match on December 7.

No.	Results	Stipulations	Times
1	Reo Hazuki defeated Kris Wolf and Momo Watanabe	Rookie of Stardom decision match	17:41

== 2015 ==
The 2015 edition returned to the traditional single-elimination tournament rules and took place on December 6.

Semifinals
Jungle Kyona	Pin
Starlight Kid	5:09
Saori Anou	4:42
Hiromi Mimura	Pin

Finals
Jungle Kyona	Pin
Hiromi Mimura	7:36

== 2016 ==
The 2016 edition of the tournament took place on December 4.

Semifinals
Arisu Nanase	Pin
Ruaka	5:06
Azumi	5:06
Natsuko Tora	Pin

Finals
Arisu Nanase	Pin
Natsuko Tora	4:53

== 2017 ==
The 2017 edition of the tournament took place on December 10 place under a singles bout.

No.	Results	Stipulations	Times
1	Shiki Shibusawa defeated Hanan	Rookie of Stardom decision match	9:32

== 2018 ==
The 2018 edition of the tournament took place under gauntlet match rules on December 12.

No.	Results	Stipulations	Times
1	Utami Hayashishita defeated Rina, Hina and Natsumi	Rookie of Stardom decision match	9:55

== 2019 ==
The 2019 edition returned to the traditional single-elimination tournament rules and took place on December 8.

Semifinals
Saya Kamitani	Pin
Itsuki Hoshino	4:51
Leo Onozaki	6:21
Saya Iida	Pin

Finals
Saya Kamitani	Pin
Saya Iida	7:09

== 2023 ==
The 2023 edition took place on January 3, 2024, at Stardom New Year Stars 2024.

Round 1
Yuzuki	Pin
Ranna Yagami	6:52
Hanako	Pin
Sayaka Kurara	5:13

Finals
Yuzuki	Pin
Hanako	7:23

== 2026 ==
The 2026 edition took place on April 11, 2026 at Korakuen Hall.

Round 1 April 4, 5
Yuria Hime	Sub
Anne Kanaya	9:49
Akira Kurogane	Sub
Matoi Hamabe	12:12

Semifinals; April 8
Ema Maishima	Pin
Yuria Hime	13:05
Kikyo Furusawa	Sub
Akira Kurogane	13:51

Finals; April 11
Ema Maishima	Pin
Kikyo Furusawa	15:28
