= Yuhi (wrestler) =

Japanese retired professional wrestler (born 1995)

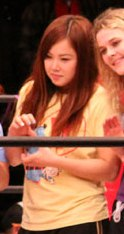
- Yuhi in April 2014

Personal information
- Born: July 30, 1995 (age 30) Asaka, Saitama

Professional wrestling career
- Ring name(s): Sunset☆JK; Yuhi
- Billed height: 1.56 m (5 ft 1 1/2 in)
- Billed weight: 53 kg (117 lb)
- Trained by: Ikuto Hidaka; Satoshi Kobayashi
- Debut: April 24, 2012
- Retired: March 31, 2014

Yuhi (夕陽, Yūhi; born July 30, 1995) is a Japanese retired professional wrestler. She was trained in not only professional wrestling, but also kickboxing, by Ikuto Hidaka and Satoshi Kobayashi at the Pro Wrestling Zero1 Norainu Dojo and made her debut on April 24, 2012, against Yuzuki Aikawa. She remained affiliated with Zero1 for her entire career, but, due to the low number of women's matches held by the promotion, spent most of her time working with the World Wonder Ring Stardom promotion, where she won the Rookie of Stardom tournament in December 2012 and her first professional wrestling title, the Artist of Stardom Championship, in June 2013. Yuhi retired from professional wrestling in March 2014, coinciding with her high school graduation.

== Professional wrestling career ==
With a six-year sports background in dancing and two years in acrobatics, Yuhi enrolled in the Bukuro Gym in 2009 to begin training kickboxing under Satoshi Kobayashi. While there, she met professional wrestler Ikuto Hidaka, who was impressed by her, but did not have his own dojo at the time. In February 2011, Kobayashi left Bukuro Gym to form the Norainu Dojo in collaboration with professional wrestling promotion Pro Wrestling Zero1. Yuhi followed Kobayashi to Norainu Dojo, where she continued her kickboxing training, but also began training professional wrestling mainly under Hidaka, but also guest trainers like Nanae Takahashi and Natsuki☆Taiyo, while also continuing her high school studies at Senior High School at Sakado, University of Tsukuba.

=== Pro Wrestling Zero1 (2012) ===
On January 21, 2012, Zero1 presented Yuhi to the public and announced she was almost ready to make her professional wrestling debut. It was announced that she would be performing under her real given name Yuhi, which is Japanese for "sunset"; by coincidence Hidaka had previously run a women's wrestling promotion named Pro Wrestling Sun. On April 14, Zero1 revealed that the promotion had recruited World Wonder Ring Stardom representative and Tokyo Sports' 2011 joshi wrestler of the year, Yuzuki Aikawa, to serve as Yuhi's debut opponent. Ten days later, Yuhi made her debut at a Pro Wrestling Zero1 event in Tokyo's Korakuen Hall, losing to Aikawa. On April 28, Yuhi was defeated by freelancer Hiroyo Matsumoto at a small outdoor event in her hometown of Asaka, Saitama.

=== World Wonder Ring Stardom (2012–2014) ===
On May 3, 2012, Yuhi made her first appearance outside of Zero1, when she made her debut for women's wrestling promotion World Wonder Ring Stardom, losing to Io Shirai in a singles match. Yuhi and Hiroyo Matsumoto had a rematch at a larger Zero1 event in Korakuen Hall on May 16, where Matsumoto once again was victorious. On May 20, Yuhi returned to Stardom, wrestling Arisa Hoshiki to a fifteen-minute time limit draw in a main event "draft match". After the match, all of Stardom's stables; Io Shirai's Planet, Nanae Takahashi's Nanae Gundan, Natsuki☆Taiyo's Kawasaki Katsushika Saikyou Densetsu Plus One, and Yuzuki Aikawa's Zenryoku Joshi, entered the ring in an attempt to convince Yuhi to join them. Eventually, Yuhi chose to join Zenryoku Joshi, which also included Kairi Hojo, Saki Kashima and Yoko Bito, and was two weeks later also joined by old associate Hiroyo Matsumoto. Due to the complete lack of other female wrestlers in Zero1, this effectively made Stardom Yuhi's new home promotion, though she was still billed as a Zero1 Norainu Dojo representative.

On June 10, 2012, Yuhi won her first match, when she and Kairi Hojo defeated Eri Susa and Yuuri Haruka, though she did not score the deciding pinfall. On July 8, Yuhi faced World of Stardom Champion Nanae Takahashi in a losing effort in a non-title match. She finally picked up her first direct win on July 22 by pinning Yuuri Haruka in a Stardom Rumble to earn a spot in the upcoming 2012 5Star Grand Prix. Yuhi entered the tournament on August 19, losing to Yoshiko in her first round-robin match. She then continued the tournament, defeating Act Yasukawa on August 26, losing to Nanae Takahashi on September 2, wrestling Io Shirai to a fifteen-minute time limit draw on September 17, and losing to eventual tournament winner Yuzuki Aikawa on September 30, as a result, failing to advance from her block. While the tournament was still ongoing, Yuhi took part in the independent Joshi 4 Hope IV event on October 7, defeating American wrestler Veda Scott in a singles match. On October 20, Yuhi returned to Zero1, facing Oz Academy representative Aja Kong in a losing effort. On October 27, Yuhi and Aikawa entered the 2012 Goddesses of Stardom Tag League, contested for the vacant Goddesses of Stardom Championship. In their first round-robin match, the team, billed as "Y Dash", defeated Eri Susa and Nozomi. On November 6, Yuhi returned to Zero1 taking part in an all Stardom tag team match, where she and Kairi Hojo defeated Mayu Iwatani and Natsumi Showzuki. Y Dash continued their Goddesses of Stardom Tag League on November 11 with a win over Thunder Rock (Io Shirai and Mayu Iwatani), but a loss to Kawasaki Katsushika Saikyou Densetsu (Natsuki☆Taiyo and Yoshiko) on November 25 meant that they narrowly failed to qualify for the finals of the tournament.

On December 9, Yuhi entered the second annual Rookie of Stardom tournament. After defeating Zenryoku Joshi stablemate Kairi Hojo in her first round match, she won the tournament by defeating Act Yasukawa in the finals. In a post-match victory speech, Yuhi made a challenge for the Goddesses of Stardom Championship on December 24, but as Yuzuki Aikawa was already booked for the event, she chose Hiroyo Matsumoto, whom she referred to as her "older sister" and Zero1 training partner, as her new partner. On December 24, Yuhi and Matsumoto were defeated in their title match by the defending champions, Natsuki☆Taiyo and Yoshiko. Yuhi wrestled her first match of 2013 back in Zero1 on January 1, losing to Sendai Girls' Pro Wrestling representative Meiko Satomura in a singles match. After Yuzuki Aikawa had announced her upcoming retirement from professional wrestling, she disbanded Zenryoku Joshi on January 14, 2013. In her final match as a representative of the stable, Yuhi was defeated by Hailey Hatred in a singles match. On January 25, Yuhi made her debut under a mask as "Sunset☆JK", losing to "Masked Hiroyon", the masked Hiroyo Matsumoto, at a Zero1 event. On March 31, Yuhi teamed with Mayu Iwatani in a tag team match, where they were defeated by Kawasaki Katsushika Saikyou Densetsu representatives Natsuki☆Taiyo and Yoshiko. After the match, Yuhi made a challenge for Taiyo's High Speed Championship, which was promptly accepted by the champion. On April 14, Yuhi earner a big win by pinning Yuzuki Aikawa at the end of a seventeen-woman gauntlet match. The following day, Yuhi wrestled her one-year anniversary match back in Zero1, where she was defeated by veteran wrestler Manami Toyota. On April 29 at Ryōgoku Cinderella, Yuhi unsuccessfully challenged Natsuki☆Taiyo for the High Speed Championship.

Yuhi was then set to go against Wonder of Stardom Champion Dark Angel in a special non-title singles match, however, after she managed to pin Dark Angel in a tag team match on May 26, the champion agreed to put her title on the line in their upcoming match. Yuhi received her title shot on June 2, but was defeated by Dark Angel. On June 23, Yuhi teamed with Kairi Hojo and Kaori Yoneyama to defeat the Kimura Monster-gun (Christina Von Eerie, Hailey Hatred and Kyoko Kimura) in a decision match to win the vacant Artist of Stardom Championship, her first professional wrestling title. The three made their first successful title defense on August 17 against Kawasaki Katsushika Saikyou Densetsu (Act Yasukawa, Natsuki☆Taiyo and Yoshiko). In August, Yuhi also began making appearances for Sendai Girls' Pro Wrestling, making her debut on August 30, when she, Hikaru Shida, Kagetsu and Sareee were defeated in an eight-woman tag team match by Aja Kong, Ayako Hamada, Dynamite Kansai and Manami Toyota. On September 6, Yuhi wrestled her first match against her trainer Ikuto Hidaka, which she lost via submission. From August 25 to September 23, Yuhi took part in 5★Star GP2013, where she finished with a record of two wins, one draw and two losses, failing to qualify for the finals. On October 14, Yuhi, Hojo and Yoneyama, now known collectively as "Chibis", made their second successful defense of the Artist of Stardom Championship against Hiroyo Matsumoto, Mayu Iwatani and Miho Wakizawa. On October 17, Yuhi took part in a big generational eight-on-eight elimination match promoted by Sendai Girls' Pro Wrestling, where she, Hikaru Shida, Kagetsu, Manami Katsu, Sareee, Syuri, Takumi Iroha and Yoshiko defeated Aja Kong, Command Bolshoi, Dump Matsumoto, Dynamite Kansai, Kyoko Inoue, Manami Toyota, Meiko Satomura and Takako Inoue. Yuhi eliminated Toyota, Takako Inoue and Kansai from the match, before being eliminated herself by Kong. On October 20, Yuhi and Yoneyama entered the 2013 Goddesses of Stardom Tag Tournament, but were eliminated in their first round match by Act Yasukawa and Kyoko Kimura. On November 4 at Stardom's 100th event, Chibis lost the Artist of Stardom Championship to the Kimura Monster-gun (Alpha Female, The Female Predator "Amazon" and Kyoko Kimura) in their third title defense. On December 8, Yuhi pinned Kaori Yoneyama in a "Best of High Speed" tag team main event and afterwards challenged her to a match for the High Speed Championship. Yuhi received her title shot on December 23, but was defeated by Yoneyama. On February 9, 2014, Chibis received a rematch for the Artist of Stardom Championship, but were defeated by the defending champions, Tawashis (Hiroyo Matsumoto, Mayu Iwatani and Miho Wakizawa).

On February 11, Yuhi announced at a Zero1 event that she would be retiring from professional wrestling, wanting to find a new career after her high school graduation. She then announced a retirement tour, which would see her make debuts for Ice Ribbon, JWP Joshi Puroresu, Osaka Joshi Pro Wrestling and Pro Wrestling Wave. Yuhi first made her debut for Pro Wrestling Wave on February 19, losing to Ayako Hamada in a main event singles match. As part of her road to retirement, Yuhi was also given some of the biggest singles matches of her career, losing to JWP Openweight Champion Arisa Nakajima at Zero1's March 9 event, and to Kana in a 41-minute match at a special one-match Norainu Dojo event on March 13. Three days later, Yuhi wrestled her final Stardom match, unsuccessfully challenging Act Yasukawa for the Wonder of Stardom Championship. On March 19, Yuhi wrestled her final Pro Wrestling Wave match, a six-woman tag team main event, where she, Rina Yamashita and Sawako Shimono were defeated by Wave Single Champion Yumi Ohka and Wave Tag Team Champions Ayako Hamada and Yuu Yamagata. The following day, Yuhi made her first and only appearance for JWP Joshi Puroresu, teaming with Rina Yamashita in a tag team match, where they were defeated by Manami Katsu and Sawako Shimono. On March 21, Yuhi also made her first and only appearance for Osaka Joshi Pro Wrestling, teaming with Manami Toyota and Mima Shimoda in a six-woman tag team match, where they defeated Hibiscus Mii, Hikaru Shida and Kyusei Ninja Ranmaru. On March 26, Yuhi made her debut for Ice Ribbon, teaming with Risa Sera in a tag team main event, where they were defeated by Tsukasa Fujimoto and Tsukushi. On March 30, Yuhi returned to her home promotion for her final Zero1 event, where she was defeated by Meiko Satomura. The following day, Norainu Dojo presented Yuhi's retirement show at Shin-Kiba 1st Ring, during which she wrestled three times; first as Sunset☆JK, teaming with Masked Hiroyon to defeat Mika Iida and Misaki Ohata in a tag team match and then losing to Natsuki☆Taiyo in what was advertised as her retirement match. However, afterwards Yuhi agreed to one final tag team match, where she and Taiyo were defeated by Yoshiko and Hiroyo Matsumoto, who pinned Yuhi to end her professional wrestling career.

== Championships and accomplishments ==
- World Wonder Ring Stardom
  - Artist of Stardom Championship (1 time) – with Kairi Hojo and Kaori Yoneyama
  - Stardom Rookie of the Year (2012)
  - 5★Star GP Award (1 time)
    - 5★Star GP Outstanding Performance Award (2013)
