= Yuzuki Aikawa =

Japanese gravure idol and wrestler (born 1983)

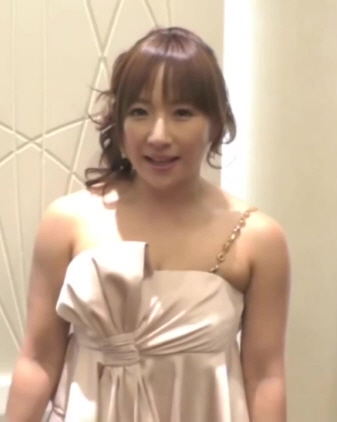
- Aikawa in April 2013
- Born: May 16, 1983 (age 43); Niihama, Ehime, Japan
- Other name: Yuzupon
- Occupation: Gravure idol
- Years active: 2003–present
- Modeling information
- Height: 157 cm (5 ft 2 in)
- Hair color: Brown
- Eye color: Brown
- Agency: Platinum Production
- Website: Yuzupon blog

Yuzuki Aikawa (愛川 ゆず季, Aikawa Yuzuki; born May 16, 1983) is a Japanese gravure idol and retired professional wrestler. Starting her modeling career in 2003, Aikawa went on to become one of Japan's top gravure idols, earning the nickname "The Gravure Queen of the Next Generation" by appearing in various men's magazines, advertising campaigns, films, television programs and video games.

In 2010, Aikawa transitioned into professional wrestling, joining the newly founded World Wonder Ring Stardom promotion, becoming its public face and the inaugural holder of the Wonder of Stardom and Goddesses of Stardom Championships. Aikawa's first year in professional wrestling ended with the Tokyo Sports magazine naming her the 2011 female wrestler of the year. A year later, having successfully defended the Wonder of Stardom Championship throughout the year, while also winning the inaugural 5Star Grand Prix, Aikawa became the first wrestler to win the award two times in a row. Aikawa also produced six of her own independent wrestling events under the banner of Yuzupon Matsuri, in the vein of her trainer Fuka Kakimoto's old Fuka Matsuri events. Aikawa retired from professional wrestling on April 29, 2013. She was never defeated for either of her championships, being stripped of the Goddesses of Stardom Championship in October 2012, after her partner Yoko Bito was injured, and relinquishing the Wonder of Stardom Championship a month prior to her final match.

== Modeling career ==
Aikawa began her modeling career in 2003, appearing mainly in men's magazines, eventually being dubbed the "gravure queen of the next generation". In 2005, Aikawa won the Nittelegenic competition to become an official model for Nippon Television. Aikawa also voiced the character of Yuzu in the 2005 video game Yakuza. The following year, Aikawa was chosen as the race queen for the Super GT series, while also forming the Ooparts duo with fellow gravure idol Hitomi Aizawa, with whom she went on to release the album Himitsu no Bomber. In 2008, Aikawa became part of an idol group named Bakunyu Sentai Pai Ranger, a parody version of Super Sentai, which released both a film and an album. In late 2009, Aikawa accepted a challenge made by Tokyo Broadcasting System television program Gakeppuchi to get 20,000,000 hits on her blog in three months or retire from the entertainment industry. Aikawa opened her new GREE blog on September 25 and reached her twenty millionth view just three weeks later on October 17. In 2011, Aikawa appeared in a commercial for PlayStation 3. She also appeared in Monobright's 2011 music video for their song Wonder World. During late 2011, Aikawa appeared as Itsuka Makihara in the Welcome to the El-Palacio television drama. During the first week of July 2013, Aikawa hosted WWE's Japanese tour for the J Sports channel. As part of the job, she was also featured on WWE.com. In April 2014, Aikawa began hosting the Stardom☆Cafe program for Fighting TV Samurai, alongside her younger sister Mizuki, who entered the tarento scene with her debut appearance.

== Works ==
Discography

Year	Title	Publisher
2006	Himitsu no Bomber (秘密のボンバー, Himitsu no Bonbā) (as part of Ooparts)	Girls' Record
2006	Very Merry X'mas 2006 (as part of 4You)	Girls' Record
2007	Yuzupon☆Revolution (ゆずポン☆れぼりゅーしょん, Yuzupon☆Reboryūshon)	Girls' Party
2009	Bakunyu Sentai Pai Ranger (爆乳戦隊パイレンジャー, Bakunyū Sentai Pai Renjā) (as part of Bakunyu Sentai Pai Ranger)	Ace Deuce

DVDs

Year	Title	Publisher
2004	Citron	Takeshobo
2004	Yamagishi Shin Dejitaru Shashin-shū 5: Aikawa Yuzuki (山岸伸デジタル写真集⑤愛川ゆず季)	SoftBank Publishing
2004	Binetsu (微熱)	Liverpool
2005	Hanayuzuki	Gakken
2005	Nittelegenic 2005: Aikawa Yuzuki (日テレジェニック2005 愛川ゆず季)	VAP
2005	Nittelegenic no Takarabako: Aikawa Yuzuki (日テレジェニックの宝箱 愛川ゆず季)	VAP
2006	Bishō (微笑)	Liverpool
2006	Yuzupon☆Love River (ゆずポン☆Love River)	Line Communications
2006	Yuzu Nyan? (ゆず・にゃん？)	Line Communications
2006	Yuzu Koi (ゆず恋)	Sony Music Distribution
2006	Yuzu Diary	For-side.com
2007	Aikawa Yuzuki 1st (愛川ゆず季1st)	For-side.com
2007	Yuzupon☆Revolution (ゆずポン☆れぼりゅーしょん)	Girls' Party
2007	Taiyō ga Ippai! (太陽がイッパイ！)	E-Net Frontier
2008	Double Bomb (with Hitomi Aizawa)	For-side.com
2009	Break	TMC
2010	Yuzu King (ゆずキング)	E-Net Frontier

Filmography

Year	Title
2005	School Days (スクールデイズ, Sukūrudeizu)
2005	Yūrei Yori Mo Kowai Hanashi (幽霊よりも怖い話)
2006	Higake Kinyū Jigokuden Komanezumi Jōjiro (こまねずみ常次郎)
2007	Bubble Fiction: Boom or Bust (バブルへGo！！タイムマシンはドラム式, Baburu e Go!! Taimu Mashin wa Doramu-shiki)
2008	Bakunyu Sentai Pai Ranger (爆乳戦隊パイレンジャー, Bakunyū Sentai Pai Renjā)

Photobooks

Year	Title	Publisher	ISBN
2004	Citron	Takeshobo	ISBN 978-4-8124-1751-5
2004	Miss Girl	Wani Magazine	ISBN 978-4-89829-784-1
2005	Yuzuki no Kareshi (ゆず季のカレシ（彼視）)	Ascom	ISBN 978-4-7762-0234-9
2005	Hanayuzuki (花ゆず季)	Gakken	ISBN 978-4-05-402776-3
2006	Yuzu cm: Koi ga Hajimaru Shikin Kyori (ゆずcm～恋が始まる至近距離)	Saibunkan	ISBN 978-4-7756-0126-6

Stage

Year	Title
2007	Kenkō Zenrakei Suieibu Umishō (ケンコー全裸系水泳部 ウミショー)

Television

Year	Title	Network
2011	Welcome to the El-Palacio (ここが噂のエル・パラシオ, Koko ga Uwasa no Eru Parashio)	TV Tokyo

Video games

Year	Title
2005	Yakuza (龍が如く, Ryū ga Gotoku)

== Professional wrestling career ==
Yuzuki Aikawa
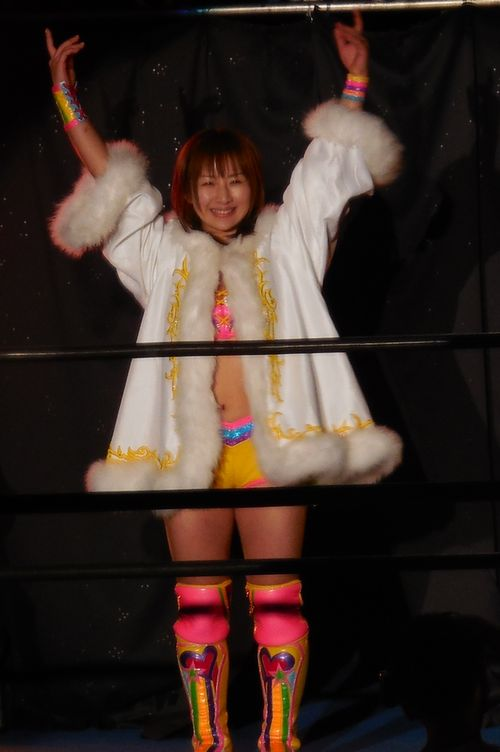
- Aikawa in March 2013

Personal information
- Born: Yuzuki Aikawa; May 16, 1983 (age 43) Niihama, Ehime

Professional wrestling career
- Ring name(s): Yuzuki Aikawa; Yuzupon Mask
- Billed height: 1.58 m (5 ft 2 in)
- Billed weight: 50 kg (110 lb)
- Trained by: Fuka; Nosawa Rongai
- Debut: October 31, 2010
- Retired: April 29, 2013

=== World Wonder Ring Stardom (2010–2013) ===
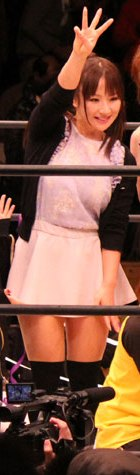
Aikawa in April 2014

On September 7, 2010, Aikawa, then known primarily as a gravure idol, announced that she was transitioning to professional wrestling, having begun training the previous May under retired professional wrestler, mixed martial artist and model Fuka Kakimoto. Aikawa, with a background in classical ballet and taekwondo, had first become interested in professional wrestling, after seeing All Japan Pro Wrestling's 2008 Champion Carnival tournament. On September 7, Aikawa appeared at the first press conference for Fuka's and Rossy Ogawa's new World Wonder Ring Stardom promotion, officially being announced as part of its roster. During the press conference, veteran wrestler Nanae Takahashi accepted Aikawa's request to become her opponent for her upcoming debut. After six months of training under Fuka and Nosawa Rongai, Aikawa made her much anticipated professional wrestling debut on October 31, 2010, in the main event of her self-produced Yuzupon Matsuri show, facing Nanae Takahashi. After a fourteen-minute beatdown, Takahashi pinned Aikawa for the win and afterwards declared that since her opponent, now with her left eye swollen shut and with a severely bruised face and chest, had withstood the punishment, she had "paid her dues" and was ready to become a true professional wrestler.

On January 23, 2011, Aikawa made her debut for Stardom at the promotion's first event, being pinned by Takahashi in a tag team match, where she and Natsuki☆Taiyo faced Takahashi and Iris. The second Yuzupon Matsuri event took place on February 6 and saw Aikawa defeat veteran Yumiko Hotta in the main event for the first win in her career. Six days later, Aikawa took her first win in Stardom, defeating Eri Susa. On April 24, Aikawa made her debut as the masked character Yuzupon Mask, a female version of Tiger Mask, wrestling nine-year-old Haruka to a three-minute time limit draw. On May 15, Aikawa wrestled Ayumi Kurihara to a twenty-minute time limit draw in the main event of the third Yuzupon Matsuri. On June 12, Aikawa formed the tag team BY Hou ("BY Cannon", a name inspired by Antonio Inoki's and Giant Baba's old BI Hou tag team) with Yoko Bito, with the two defeating Mayu Iwatani and Nanae Takahashi in their first match together. On June 26, Aikawa and Bito defeated Kawasaki Katsushika Saikyou Densetsu (Natsuki☆Taiyo and Yoshiko, shortened to Kawakatsu) to earn the title of Stardom's top tag team. On July 24, Aikawa defeated Yoshiko in a decision match to become the inaugural Wonder of Stardom Champion. Later that same day, Aikawa made an appearance for DDT Pro-Wrestling as a member of the TKG48 stable, wrestling in a fifteen-person Ironman Heavymetalweight Championship battle royal, from which she was eliminated by Emi Sakura. On August 14, BY Hou's win streak came to an end when they were defeated by Nanae Takahashi and the debuting Io Shirai, who pinned Aikawa for the win and then challenged her for the Wonder of Stardom Championship. The fourth Yuzupon Matsuri was held on August 21 and saw Aikawa defeat Dump Matsumoto twice, first via pinfall and then via countout. On September 25, Aikawa defended the Wonder of Stardom Championship for the first time, defeating Io Shirai. On October 7, Aikawa wrestled at Mil Máscaras' Japanese debut's 40th anniversary event, where she and Sanshiro Takagi defeated Mayu Iwatani and Passion Nakki (Stardom's Natsuki☆Taiyo under a mask). Later in October, Aikawa and Bito entered the Goddesses of Stardom Tag League tournament, which was used to determine the inaugural Goddesses of Stardom Champions. In their opening match, BY Hou avenged their earlier loss to Takahashi and Shirai, with Aikawa submitting Shirai for the win, taking advantage of the arm she had injured in their Wonder of Stardom Championship match. After defeating Arisa Hoshiki and Mayu Iwatani, and losing to Eri Susa and Yuu Yamagata, Aikawa and Bito lost their final round robin match to Natsuki☆Taiyo and Yoshiko on November 27. As a result, both BY Hou and Kawakatsu finished at four points and, immediately after their previous match, had another match to determine the winners of the tournament. In the match Bito pinned Yoshiko to make herself and Aikawa the inaugural Goddesses of Stardom Champions and Aikawa the promotion's first double champion. On November 3, Aikawa wrestled her first anniversary match at the fifth Yuzupon Matsuri, where she teamed with Smash wrestler Syuri in a losing effort against the team of Hiroyo Matsumoto and Nanae Takahashi. On December 11, Aikawa made an appearance for All Japan Pro Wrestling, the promotion which had first inspired her to become a professional wrestler, teaming with fellow cast members of the Welcome to the El-Palacio television series, Keiji Mutoh and Rina Takeda, in a six-person tag team match, where they defeated Kaz Hayashi, Nanae Takahashi and Natsuki☆Taiyo. Three days later, the Tokyo Sports magazine awarded Aikawa the 2011 Joshi Puroresu Grand Prize, naming her the joshi wrestler of the year, ahead of Kana, Meiko Satomura and Mayumi Ozaki. On December 23, Aikawa made her second successful defense of the Wonder of Stardom Championship, defeating Arisa Hoshiki. During the event, Aikawa was also named Stardom's MVP of 2011.

On January 8, 2012, Aikawa main evented Bull Nakano's retirement show, defeating Ice Ribbon promotion's ICE×60 and International Ribbon Tag Team Champion Hikaru Shida in a non-title Double Champion vs. Double Champion match. In February, Kairi Hojo and Saki Kashima joined Aikawa and Bito to form a stable named Zenryoku Joshi (Full Power Girls) Meanwhile, old rival Io Shirai formed the Planet stable with Arisa Hoshiki, Mayu Iwatani and Natsumi Showzuki, starting a rivalry between the two groups. The first match between Zenryoku Joshi and Planet took place on February 11, when Aikawa, Bito and Kashima defeated Shirai, Hoshiki and Iwatani, with Bito pinning Iwatani for the win. On February 26, Aikawa defended the Wonder of Stardom Championship for the third time, defeating Miho Wakizawa. On March 20, Aikawa and Bito made their first defense of the Goddesses of Stardom Championship, defeating Natsuki☆Taiyo and Yoshiko. On April 8, Aikawa promoted the sixth Yuzupon Matsuri in her hometown of Niihama, Ehime, teaming with Kairi Hojo to defeat Nanae Takahashi and Yuuri Haruka in the main event of the show. On April 24, Aikawa made her debut for Pro Wrestling Zero1, defeating the debuting Yuhi. On May 3, Aikawa was scheduled to defend the Wonder of Stardom Championship against her tag team partner Yoko Bito, but the match had to be postponed, after Aikawa suffered a hip injury. Aikawa returned to the ring at a Stardom event on May 20, during which Zero1's Yuhi joined the promotion full-time, affiliating herself with the Zenryoku Joshi stable. On May 27, Aikawa and Bito made their second successful defense of the Goddesses of Stardom Championship, defeating Miho Wakizawa and Nanae Takahashi. On June 3, Hiroyo Matsumoto left Nanae Gundan to become the sixth member of Zenryoku Joshi. Seven days later, Saki Kashima turned on the stable to join rival group Kawakatsu Plus One On June 24, Zenryoku Joshi was defeated by Kawakatsu Plus One in an eight-woman battle of the stables. On July 8, Aikawa defeated former stablemate Saki Kashima in a grudge match, contested under lumberjack rules. On August 5, Aikawa defeated tag team partner Yoko Bito to make her fourth successful defense of the Wonder of Stardom Championship. On August 18, Aikawa returned to DDT Pro-Wrestling to take part in the promotion's 15th anniversary event in Nippon Budokan. Aikawa wrestled in a thirteen-person battle royal for the Ironman Heavymetalweight Championship, from which she was the sixth person eliminated by Yoshiaki Fujiwara, who went on to win the entire match. Later that same event, Aikawa took part in a "Handicap Rumble match", acting as one of Sanshiro Takagi's equalizer's in his match with Minoru Suzuki. Suzuki eventually got rid of Aikawa with an open-hand slap, before pinning Takagi for the win. The following day, Aikawa entered the 2012 5Star Grand Prix, suffering only the second singles loss of her career in her opening match against Kawakatsu Plus One member Act Yasukawa. Aikawa, however, quickly bounced back from the loss, continuing her tournament by defeating Io Shirai on August 26 and World of Stardom Champion Nanae Takahashi on September 17. After a draw against Yoshiko and a win over Yuhi, Aikawa finished tied at the top of her round-robin block with Nanae Takahashi; however, her earlier win over Takahashi meant that she advanced to the finals of the tournament. On September 30, Aikawa defeated Kyoko Kimura in the finals to win the first ever 5★Star GP. On October 2, Aikawa and Bito were stripped of the Goddesses of Stardom Championship, after Bito had been sidelined with a cervical hernia following her August Wonder of Stardom Championship match against Aikawa. The injury eventually led to Bito retiring from professional wrestling altogether. On October 14, Aikawa avenged her loss against Act Yasukawa by defeating her in a rematch for the Wonder of Stardom Championship. On October 27, Aikawa entered the 2012 Goddesses of Stardom Tag League, teaming with Zenryoku Joshi stablemate Yuhi. In their opening round-robin match, the two defeated Eri Susa and Nozomi. On November 11, Aikawa and Yuhi, now billed collectively as "Y Dash", continued their tournament with a win over Thunder Rock (Io Shirai and Mayu Iwatani). On November 25, Aikawa and Yuhi were defeated in their final round-robin match by Natsuki☆Taiyo and Yoshiko and, as a result, failed to qualify for the finals of the tournament. On December 10, Aikawa became the first wrestler to win the Tokyo Sports Joshi Puroresu Grand Prize two times in a row, this time finishing ahead of Meiko Satomura, Mio Shirai and Kyusei Sakura Hirota in the voting process.

On December 18, Aikawa announced that she would retire from professional wrestling on April 29, 2013. She revealed that she had contemplated retirement throughout the year, feeling that professional wrestling had started to get too tough on her near thirty-year-old body, finally deciding to continue until Stardom's big event in Ryōgoku Kokugikan. On December 24, Aikawa received her shot at the World of Stardom Championship, which she had earned by winning the 5★Star GP, but was unable to dethrone the defending champion, Nanae Takahashi. Afterwards, Aikawa was confronted by her Zenryoku Joshi stablemate Kairi Hojo, who challenged her to a match for the Wonder of Stardom Championship. On January 11, Aikawa and Hojo signed contracts to make the title match official, after which Aikawa announced that it would also serve as the farewell match of the Zenryoku Joshi stable. On January 14, Aikawa defeated Hojo to make her sixth successful defense of the Wonder of Stardom Championship. On January 19, Aikawa wrestled what was billed as her final match in her home prefecture, when she, Hiroyo Matsumoto and Kairi Hojo defeated Eri Susa, Miho Wakizawa and Nanae Takahashi in Matsuyama, Ehime. On January 27, Aikawa made what was billed as her final return to DDT Pro-Wrestling, teaming with Sanshiro Takagi in a mixed tag team match, where they were defeated by Danshoku Dino and Yoshiko. However, afterwards she requested one final DDT match, a rematch with Dino and Yoshiko under "street wrestling" rules. On February 10, Aikawa made her seventh successful defense of the Wonder of Stardom Championship against Natsumi Showzuki. On March 17, Aikawa wrestled her final match at Tokyo's Korakuen Hall, losing to veteran wrestler Meiko Satomura. On March 27, Aikawa made her final wrestling appearance outside of Stardom, when she and Sanshiro Takagi defeated Danshoku Dino and Yoshiko, Jaiko Ishikawa and Kota Ibushi, and Michael Nakazawa and Miho Wakizawa in a 53-minute four-way DDT street wrestling match at the Hanayashiki amusement park. On March 31, Aikawa defeated Act Yasukawa to make her eighth and final successful defense of the Wonder of Stardom Championship. Two days later, Aikawa relinquished the title at a press conference, where the card was announced for the Ryōgoku Kokugikan event. On April 14, Aikawa took part in a special gauntlet match, where she faced every wrestler in Stardom as well as surprise entrant Syuri. Twelve of the matches ended in one-minute time limit draws, Aikawa won four of them and suffered her only loss in the final match against Yuhi. Later that same day, Aikawa took part in Stardom Mask Fiesta, which saw her make her final appearance as Yuzupon Mask, teaming with Iotica, the masked Io Shirai, and Mexican legend Mil Máscaras in a six-person tag team main event, where they defeated Black Tiger V, Mayucica and Passion Seven. On April 29, Aikawa wrestled her retirement match in the main event of Ryōgoku Cinderella, where she was defeated by Yoshiko.

==== Sporadic appearances (2014; 2021) ====
On April 26, 2014, Aikawa returned to Stardom during the 2014 Stardom Mask Fiesta. She refereed a match in her Yuzupon Mask character, helping Mini Iotica win a four-way match.

On March 3, 2021, Aikawa competed in the Stardom All Star Rumble at Stardom All Star Dream Cinderella. She was eliminated by eventual winner Unagi Sayaka.

== Personal life ==
Aikawa married her partner of two years on September 7, 2017.

== Championships and accomplishments ==
- Nikkan Sports
  - Joshi Puroresu MVP (2011, 2012)
  - Joshi Tag Team Award (2011) with Yoko Bito
  - Joshi Fighting Spirit Award (2011)
  - Joshi Newcomer Award (2010)
- Tokyo Sports
  - Joshi Puroresu Grand Prize (2011, 2012)
- World Wonder Ring Stardom
  - Goddesses of Stardom Championship (1 time) – with Yoko Bito
  - Wonder of Stardom Championship (1 time)
  - Goddesses of Stardom Tag League (2011) – with Yoko Bito
  - 5★Star GP (2012)
  - 5★Star GP Award (1 time)
    - 5★Star GP Best Match Award (2012) vs. Nanae Takahashi on September 17
  - Stardom Year-End Award (4 times)
    - Best Bout Award (2012) vs. Nanae Takahashi on September 17 and December 24
    - Best Match Award (2013) vs. Yoshiko on April 29
    - MVP Award (2011)
    - Outstanding Performance Award (2012)
