= Star Fire (wrestler) =

Mexican professional wrestler

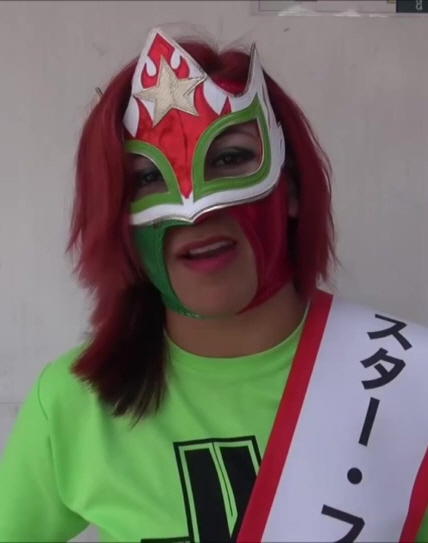
- Star Fire in 2014

Personal information
- Born: February 4, 1992 (age 34) Mexico City, Mexico

Professional wrestling career
- Ring name: Star Fire
- Billed height: 1.58 m (5 ft 2 in)
- Billed weight: 56 kg (123 lb)
- Trained by: Arturo Beristain; Skayde; Último Guerrero; Cynthia Moreno; Nanae Takahashi; Io Shirai
- Debut: April 27, 2006

Star Fire (born February 4, 1992) is a Mexican professional wrestler. Star Fire's real name is not a matter of public record, as is often the case with masked wrestlers in Mexico where their private lives are kept a secret from the professional wrestling fans.

She is primarily known for her work for World Wonder Ring Stardom in Japan, where she is a former High Speed Champion, as well as a former member of the Oedo Tai stable.

== Professional wrestling career ==
Star Fire started to fight with the Consejo Mundial de Lucha Libre and first appeared at Arena Mexico in 2007. She fought there for two years.

=== World Wonder Ring Stardom (2014–2015) ===
On May 18, 2014, Star Fire had her debut match for World Wonder Ring Stardom teaming with Diosa Atenea in a losing effort against Io Shirai and Kairi Hojo. She won her first title, the High Speed Championship, by defeating Koguma on May 17, 2015. On July 27, Fire made her first successful defense of the High Speed Championship against Kris Wolf. She lost the title to Rosa Negra in her second defense on September 23.

=== Independent circuit (2018) ===
Star Fire returned to the ring after two years out of the ring due an injury in Japan, teaming with Marcela defeated Lilith Dark and Metálica.

=== Lucha Libre AAA Worldwide (2018–2020) ===
On June 4, Star Fire made her debut at AAA in Verano de Escándalo teaming with Hijo de Vikingo, Arkangel Divino and Dinastía in a tag team match, where they defeated Arez, Belial, Ultimo Maldito and Lady Maravilla.

== Championships and accomplishments ==
- Women Wrestling Stars
  - WWS Championship (1 time)
  - WWS Next Star Tournament (2014)
- World Wonder Ring Stardom
  - High Speed Championship (1 time)
