= Kris Wolf =

American professional wrestler

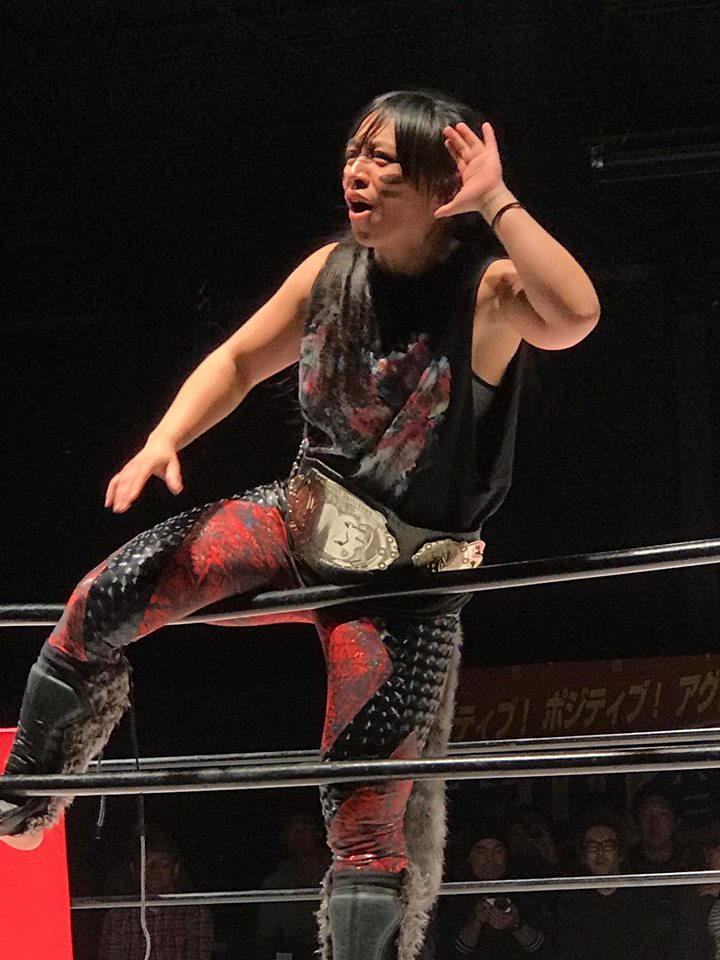
- Wolf in 2017, before her first title defense at Shin-Kiba 1st Ring

Personal information
- Born: Kris Hernandez; August 12, 1984 (age 42) Chicago, Illinois, U.S.

Professional wrestling career
- Ring name(s): Blood Rayne; Crazy Wolf; Gaki Ōkami; Kris Wolf; Shadow
- Billed height: 1.47 m (4 ft 10 in)
- Billed weight: 51 kg (112 lb)
- Trained by: Fuka Kakimoto; Nanae Takahashi; Io Shirai
- Debut: August 10, 2014
- Retired: April 26, 2019

Kris Hernandez (born August 12, 1984) is an American retired professional wrestler, best known by the ring name Kris Wolf. She wrestled for World Wonder Ring Stardom in Japan, where she is a former High Speed Champion, as well as a founding member of the Oedo Tai stable. She has also wrestled for Ring of Honor, Alternative Wrestling Show (AWS), Westside Xtreme Wrestling (wXw) and Pro Wrestling: EVE. On February 6, 2019, Hernandez announced on her YouTube channel that she would be performing her final tour with Stardom in the upcoming weeks, and retiring due to concussion issues throughout her career.

Originally working as a freelance photographer in San Francisco, California, Hernandez wanted to become a wrestler after living a year and a half in Japan and seeing a Stardom match on YouTube. She was trained by Fuka Kakimoto, Io Shirai and Nanae Takahashi, and debuted on August 10, 2014, in a three-way match with Reo Hazuki and Koguma.

== Professional wrestling career ==
=== World Wonder Ring Stardom (2014–2018) ===
On August 10, 2014, Wolf had her debut match for World Wonder Ring Stardom in a losing effort against Koguma and Reo Hazuki in a three-way match. At Mask Fiesta 2014 on October 26, Wolf, performing under the name Shadow, teamed up with Mystique in a loss to Shinba and Star Fire. At Mask Fiesta 2015 on October 25, 2015, Wolf, under the ring name Crazy Wolf, teamed up with Datura in a loss to Lucky Blanca and Santana Wonder. She won her first title, the High Speed Championship, by defeating Mayu Iwatani and Kagetsu in a three-way match on February 23, 2017. She lost the title to Shanna on July 16. On December 2, Wolf won the Alternative Wrestling Show (AWS) Women's World Championship, defeating Nicole Savoy.

Wolf left World Wonder Ring Stardom on March 25, 2018.

=== Independent circuit (2018–2019) ===
After leaving Stardom, Wolf competed regularly for independent promotions in the U.K., Ireland, mainland Europe and North America.

On February 6, 2019, she announced her retirement from wrestling due to severe concussion issues throughout her career, and announced she would do a final tour in the upcoming future. She had her final match on April 26, 2019.

== Other media ==
Hernandez has a YouTube account, where she uploads infrequently. She also streams infrequently on Twitch.

Hernandez appeared in the documentary series "The Wrestlers", which was originally broadcast on Viceland in 2019.

== Personal life ==
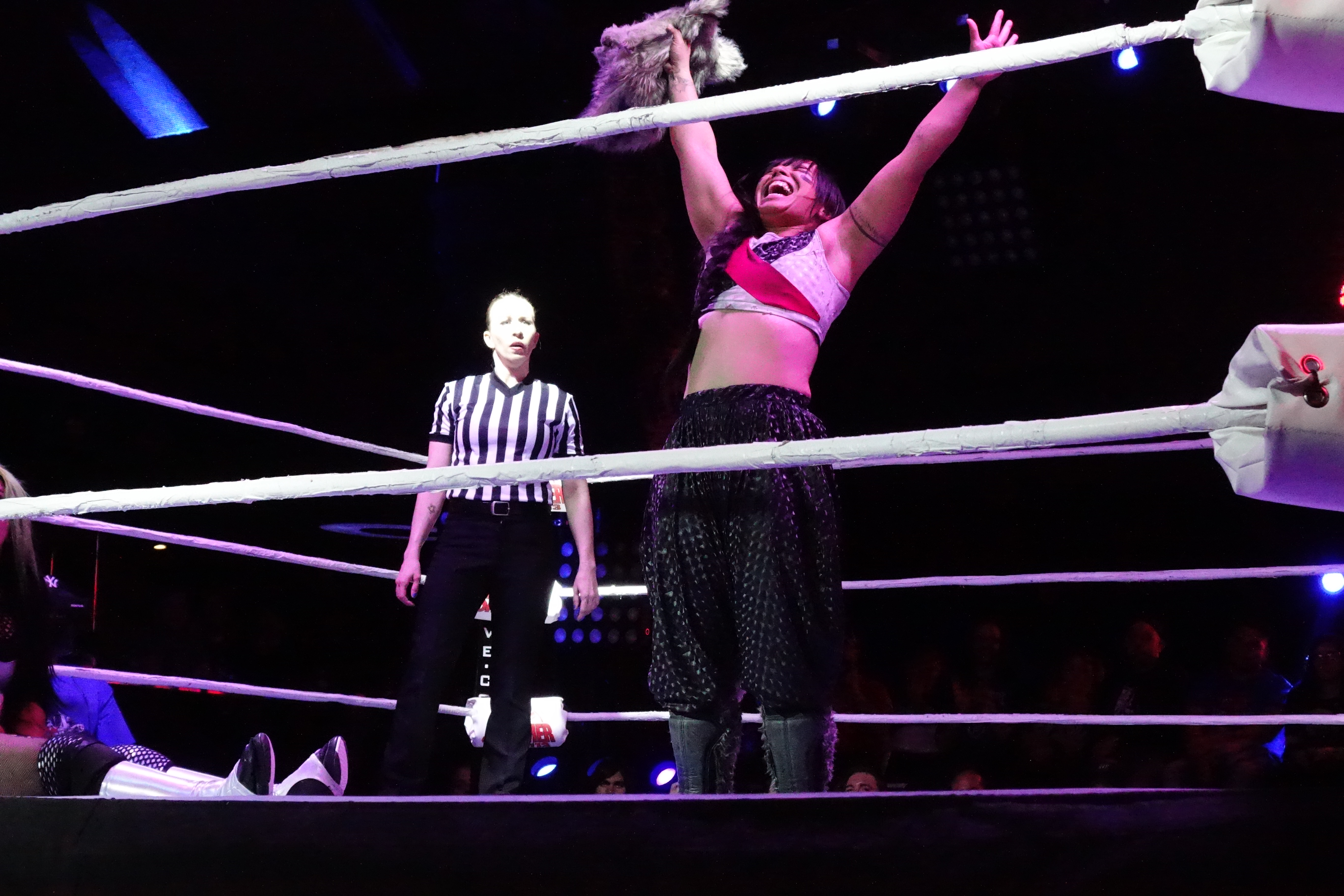
Kris Wolf during a Shimmer event

Hernandez is originally from Chicago, Illinois, and is of Filipino descent. She spent most of her childhood and teenage years in New Jersey, where she and her sister were raised by her mother. After moving out at the age of 18, she eventually settled in San Francisco, California. She relocated to Tokyo, Japan, where she lived for six years, after the breakup of a long-term relationship; she originally visited Japan just as a retreat and fell in love with the country after spending twenty days cycling through the Japanese countryside. She worked as an English teacher in Tokyo for a year and a half, until somebody suggested that she should consider doing joshi puroresu after she was having second thoughts about her career; this led her to finding a Stardom match on YouTube and signing up to train at the promotion.

On August 1, 2018, Hernandez announced that she had created a Patreon account. She uploads new content to her Patreon account on a regular basis.

In January 2019, Hernandez, in-character as Kris Wolf, announced her marriage to her partner.

Hernandez currently lives with her partner in Oslo, Norway.

== Championships and accomplishments ==
- Alternative Wrestling Show
  - AWS Women's World Championship (1 time)
- Pro Wrestling Illustrated
  - Ranked No. 28 of the top 100 female wrestlers in the PWI Female 100 in 2018
- World Wonder Ring Stardom
  - High Speed Championship (1 time)
