= Yoko Bito =

Japanese retired professional wrestler (born 1986)

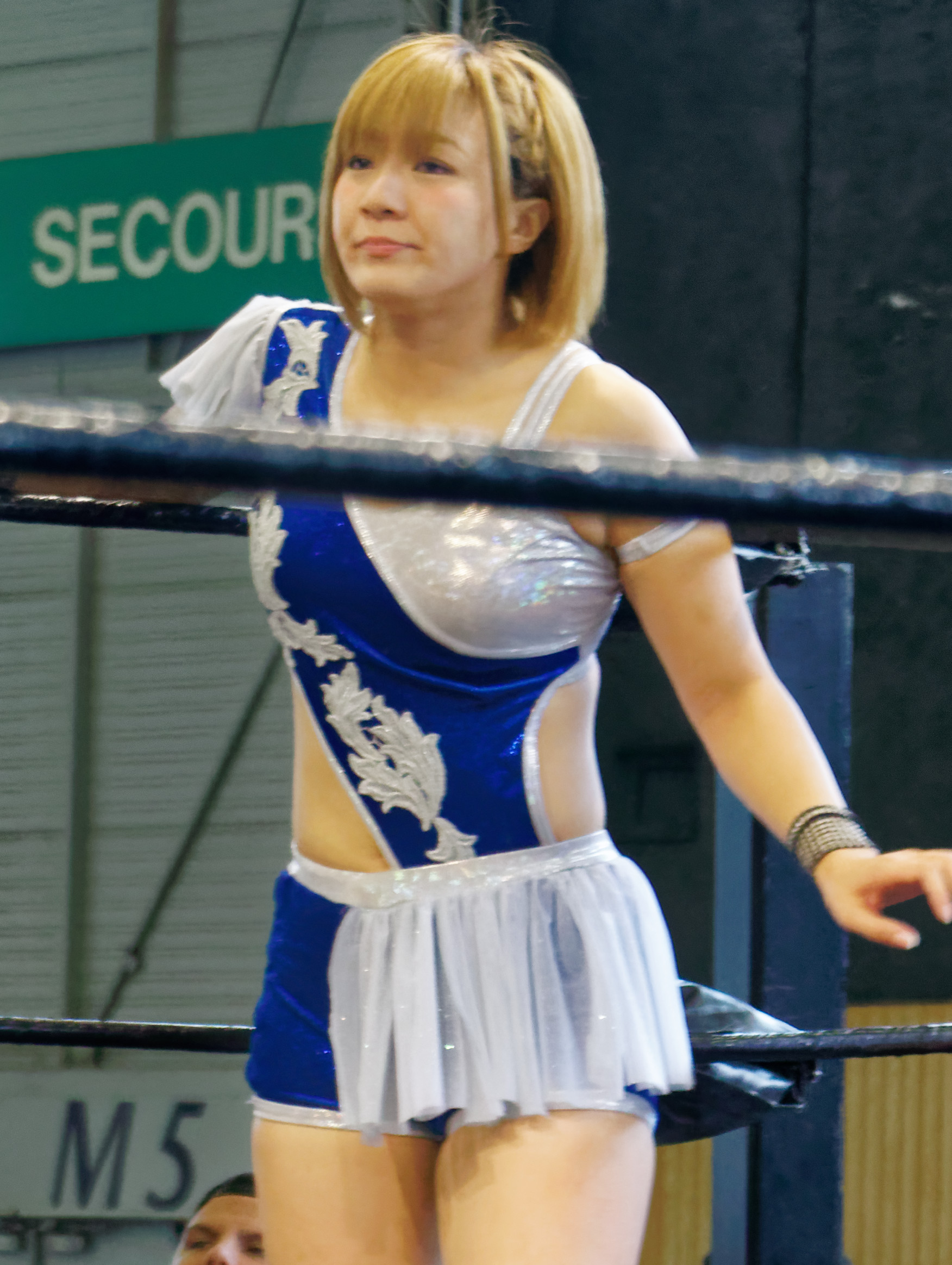
- Bito in July 2017

Personal information
- Born: Yoko Arai; December 13, 1986 (age 39) Kawaguchi, Saitama, Japan

Professional wrestling career
- Ring name(s): Aloha Bito; Yoko Bito
- Billed height: 170 cm (5 ft 7 in)
- Billed weight: 62 kg (137 lb)
- Trained by: Fuka
- Debut: January 23, 2011
- Retired: December 24, 2017

Yoko Arai (新井 陽子, Arai Yōko; born December 13, 1986) is a Japanese retired professional wrestler better known by the ring name Yoko Bito (美闘 陽子, Bitō Yōko). Bito initially made her in-ring debut in December 2010 for World Wonder Ring Stardom and quickly became one of the most popular wrestlers in the promotion, until announcing her retirement from in-ring competition in November 2012. Bito came out of retirement and returned to Stardom in April 2016, and returned to the ring in June of that year, before retiring again in December 2017.

== Professional wrestling career ==
=== World Wonder Ring Stardom (2010–2012) ===
Bito entered Stardom's professional wrestling dojo in 2010 with a background in karate and handball. She, along with Mayu Iwatani and Kairi Hojo was a member of the first graduating class of Stardom's professional wrestling school where she was trained by Fuka. She made her debut on December 31, 2010, wrestling Eri Susa to a time limit draw. On January 21, 2011, in the main event of Stardom's first ever show, Bito defeated Yoshiko for her first professional win. Bito made Stardom her home promotion, and in July, she made it to the finals of the tournament to crown the first ever World of Stardom Champion, where she lost to Nanae Takahashi. In November, Bito teamed with Yuzuki Aikawa, her main rival, to take part in the tournament to crown the first ever winners of the Goddesses of Stardom Championship. In the final, Bito and Aikawa defeated Yoshiko and Natsuki☆Taiyo to become the inaugural champions. Bito and Aikawa held on to the championships throughout the rest of 2011 and into 2012. In August 2012, Bito challenged Aikawa for the Wonder of Stardom Championship, where she was unsuccessful. This would turn out to be Bito's last match before announcing her retirement in November of that year, citing neck and back injuries as her reason and subsequently vacating the Goddesses of Stardom Championship.

=== Return to Stardom (2016–2017) ===
After a near four-year absence from professional wrestling, Bito announced her return to the ring in April 2016, and made her official in-ring return on June 16 at Korakuen Hall, losing to Kairi Hojo. In August, Bito took part in the 2016 5★Star GP, winning all but one of her matches and tying for first place. On September 11, Bito defeated Kay Lee Ray in a tiebreaker and made it to the final, where she defeated Tessa Blanchard to win the tournament. On October 10, Bito unsuccessfully challenged Io Shirai for the World of Stardom Championship. On November 11, Bito teamed with Kairi Hojo to defeat Shirai and Mayu Iwatani in the final of the 2016 Goddesses of Stardom Tag League. On December 22, Bito teamed with Kairi Hojo to win the Goddesses of Stardom Championship for the second time in her career, defeating Oedo Tai (Kagetsu and Kyoko Kimura). On January 15, Bito and Hojo made their first successful defence against Kay Lee Ray and Nixon Newell, but dropped the title to Hiroyo Matsumoto and Jungle Kyona on March 5.

On September 23, 2017, Bito defeated Mayu Iwatani to win the Wonder of Stardom Championship for the first time. She lost the title to Io Shirai in her third defense on November 19 and afterwards announced she would again retire on December 24.

=== Sporadic appearances (2021) ===
Bito made a one night coming out of retirement at Stardom All Star Dream Cinderella on March 3, 2021, where she competed in a 24-women Stardom All Star Rumble featuring various active stars such as Unagi Sayaka, Mina Shirakawa and Bea Priestley, and from the past such as Chigusa Nagayo, Kyoko Inoue, Mima Shimoda, Yuzuki Aikawa, Emi Sakura, Momoe Nakanishi and others.

== Championships and accomplishments ==
- Nikkan Sports
  - Joshi Tag Team Award (2011) with Yuzuki Aikawa
- World Wonder Ring Stardom
  - Goddesses of Stardom Championship (2 times) – with Yuzuki Aikawa (1) and Kairi Hojo (1)
  - Wonder of Stardom Championship (1 time)
  - Goddesses of Stardom Tag League – with Yuzuki Aikawa (2011) and Kairi Hojo (2016)
  - 5★Star GP (2016)
  - Stardom Year-End Award (4 times)
    - Best Match Award (2017) vs. Takumi Iroha on October 17
    - Best Tag Team Award (2016) with Kairi Hojo
    - Outstanding Performance Award (2011, 2016)
