= Fuka Kakimoto =

Japanese professional wrestler, mixed martial artist and model

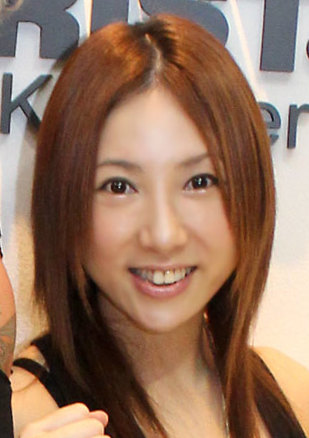
- Kakimoto in 2013

Personal information
- Born: August 20, 1984 (age 41) Nara, Nara, Japan
- Spouse: Ikki (m. 2017)

Professional wrestling career
- Ring name(s): Fuka; Fuka Angel; Tigre Fuka
- Billed height: 1.55 m (5 ft 1 in)
- Billed weight: 50 kg (110 lb)
- Trained by: Jaguar Yokota
- Debut: February 29, 2004
- Retired: March 28, 2010

Fuka Kakimoto (柿本 風香, Kakimoto Fūka; born August 20, 1984) is a Japanese retired professional wrestler, mixed martial artist and model better known simply as Fuka (風香, Fūka) (pronounced and sometimes transliterated as "Fuuka") signed to Dream Star Fighting Marigold, who is best known for being a trainer and co-founder for World Wonder Ring Stardom. She was trained by JDStar as part of the promotion's "Athtress" program, making her debut in February 2004 and quickly garnering a large fan following.

From 2005 to 2006, Fuka also fought three mixed martial arts fights, finishing with a record of two wins and one loss. During her years in JDStar, Fuka became the inaugural Princess of Pro-Wrestling (POP) Champion and also held the Princess of Ketsudeka (POK) and TWF World Tag Team Championships. After the promotion folded in July 2007, Fuka became a freelancer, while also starting to promote her own series of independent wrestling events under the banner of Fuka Matsuri ("Fuka Festival"). As a freelancer, Fuka also made several trips to Mexico, working for local independent promotions.

Fuka ended her in-ring career in March 2010 at the age of 25, after which she began training wrestlers for the newly founded World Wonder Ring Stardom promotion. When Stardom was officially announced the following September, Fuka was appointed the General Manager of the promotion, a role she held until 2018. As a model, Fuka is signed to the Platinum Production agency. Her older brother, Daichi, is also a professional wrestler, most notably working for Dramatic Dream Team (DDT) between 2003 and 2014, and her father Masahide and oldest brother Genki have also made appearances in wrestling matches involving her.

== Professional wrestling career ==
=== JDStar (2004–2007) ===
Kakimoto received her training in professional wrestling at the dojo of the JDStar promotion, being part of the last batch of women to go through the promotion's "Athtress" program, which aimed at building physically attractive women into not only professional wrestlers, but also mainstream celebrities. Kakimoto, working just as "Fuka", made her debut on February 29, 2004, teaming with Kyusei Ninja Ranmaru in a tag team match, where they were defeated by Kazuki and Tomoya. Fuka's career started with a long losing streak, which earned her the nickname "Haru Urara of Women's Professional Wrestling", after a Japanese racehorse that gained popularity due to a long string of consecutive losses. Similarly, Fuka also quickly gathered a large fan following, especially among men. Her popularity also earned her a spot on an event held by All Japan Pro Wrestling, which normally did not promote women's wrestling matches, losing to Keiko Saito in a singles match on August 7, 2005.

In February 2006, JDStar announced that Fuka had finished her training and was now a full-fledged member of the promotion's roster. The following April, Fuka entered the League Princess tournament, set to determine the inaugural Princess of Pro-Wrestling (POP) Champion. After three wins, one loss and one draw, Fuka advanced to the semifinals of the tournament, where she, on June 24, defeated Ayumi Kurihara. Later that same event, she defeated Natsuki☆Head in the finals to become the 2006 League Princess and the inaugural Princess of Pro-Wrestling Champion. Fuka made her first successful title defense a month later on July 23, when she defeated Kaientai Dojo representative Bambi. During the rest of the year, she made three more successful defenses, defeating Mai Ichii on October 22, Yuri Urai on November 5, and Caribbean Rum on December 3. On June 23, Fuka also made an appearance at a special event produced by Último Dragón, during which she entered the Dragon Mixture tournament, a one-night, single-elimination tournament, during which the number of participants in each team was reduced as the tournament progressed. In the first round, Fuka teamed with her brother Daichi, Kota Ibushi and Seiya Morohashi to defeat Banana Senga, Guillermo Akiba, Hisamaru Tajima and Toujyuki Leon. In the semifinals, Fuka, Daichi and Ibushi defeated Antonio Honda, Francesca Applenya and Mori Bernard, which earned them a place in the finals, where Fuka and Ibushi defeated Shinjitsu Nohashi and Yoshitsune to win the tournament. Fuka finally lost the POP Championship to Natsuki☆Taiyo at a NEO Japan Ladies Pro Wrestling event on December 31, 2006. During 2006, Fuka also won the comedic Princess of Ketsudeka (POK) Championship and the TWF World Tag Team Championship with Shuu Shibutani.

On March 3, 2007, Fuka wrestled her third anniversary match, in which she was defeated by Nanae Takahashi. On March 21, Fuka was defeated by Ayako Hamada in a singles match, during which Hamada was particularly stiff delivering her strikes. Following the match, Fuka broke down crying and announced that she did not want to wrestle anymore. On April 13, JDStar officially sidelined Fuka due to "poor physical condition". She eventually returned on May 18, teaming with Hiroyo Matsumoto in a tag team match, where they were defeated by Ayumi Kurihara and Shuu Shibutani. Just three days later, JDStar announced that the promotion would be folding after the July 16 event. At the final event, Fuka wrestled in a tag team match, where she and JDStar trainer Jaguar Yokota defeated Misaki Ohata and Shuu Shibutani.

=== Freelancing and Fuka Matsuri (2007–2010) ===
After the folding of JDStar, Fuka became a freelancer, while also starting to promote her own independent events. The first "Fuka Matsuri" event took place on September 30, 2007, and saw Fuka and Nanae Takahashi win a four tag team main event. During the next two years, Fuka promoted approximately one Fuka Matsuri event every three months, featuring several independent workers and friends as well as members of her family. On October 7, 2007, Fuka wrestled at an event co-promoted by Nanae Takahashi's Pro Wrestling Sun and Pro Wrestling Zero1, defeating Tracy Taylor for European Wrestling Association's (EAW) World Ladies Championship.

On February 24, 2008, Fuka promoted the third Fuka Matsuri event, celebrating her fourth anniversary in professional wrestling. During the event, she wrestled twice, first in a tag team match, where she and Hikaru defeated Monster Black and Shuu Shibutani and then in a special main event, where she teamed with her brother Daichi to defeat their father Masahide and their oldest brother Genki. On May 11, Fuka made her Mexican debut for the Toryumon Mexico promotion in Mexico City, teaming with Saori in a tag team match, where they were defeated by Hiroka and Mima Shimoda. During her several future travels to Mexico, Fuka created a masked persona named "Tigre Fuka". On August 31, Fuka promoted the fifth Fuka Matsuri in her hometown of Nara, Nara. In the main event, Fuka teamed with her father Masahide to defeat Genki Kakimoto and Monster Black.

On October 11, 2008, Fuka made her debut for Dragon Gate, defeating "Hollywood" Stalker Ichikawa in back-to-back intergender singles matches. As a freelancer, Fuka also made appearances for several joshi promotions, including Ibuki, Ice Ribbon, JWP Joshi Puroresu, and Sendai Girls' Pro Wrestling. Fuka celebrated her fifth anniversary in professional wrestling on February 22, 2009, with Fuka Matsuri 7, which saw her and Nanae Takahashi defeat Haruka Matsuo and Yoshiko Tamura in the main event tag team match.

On July 5, 2009, Fuka returned to NEO Japan Ladies Pro Wrestling, teaming with Yoshiko Tamura in the Mid Summer Tag Tournament VIII. After defeating the teams of Aya Yuki and Minori Makiba, and Ayumi Kurihara and Kana, Fuka and Tamura were defeated in the finals of the tournament by Emi Sakura and Nanae Takahashi. On October 21, Fuka surprisingly announced that she would be retiring from professional wrestling the following spring. Fuka Matsuri 12 took place on December 23 and saw Fuka being defeated by Meiko Satomura in the main event. On February 25, 2010, Fuka returned to Mexico as part of her retirement tour, working under her Tigre Fuka persona at an International Wrestling Revolution Group (IWRG) event in a tag team match, where she and Flor Metalica defeated La Diabólica and Lady Metal. Three days later, she promoted her Mexican retirement event in Tlalnepantla de Baz. The thirteenth and final Fuka Matsuri took place on March 28 in Tokyo's Korakuen Hall, and featured Fuka's retirement match, in which she was defeated by Nanae Takahashi.

=== World Wonder Ring Stardom (2010–2018) ===
On September 7, 2010, Fuka and former JDStar promoter Rossy Ogawa held a press conference to announce the formation of a new promotion, named World Wonder Ring Stardom, with Fuka being assigned the title of general manager. During the past months, Fuka had started training several women, including Arisa Hoshiki, Eri Susa, Yoko Bito and most notably Yuzuki Aikawa, to become professional wrestlers for Stardom and also recruited her friend, mixed martial artist Mika Nagano, as part of the promotion's roster. Fuka worked as the on-screen authority figure and ring announcer for Stardom and started each major event with a dance performance. On January 21, 2018, at Stardom's 7th Anniversary show, Fuka announced her retirement from Stardom, as she was expecting her first child in the summer.

=== Dream Star Fighting Marigold (2024–present) ===
On April 30, 2024, Dream Star Fighting Marigold confirmed that Fuka would be their assistant producer to its owner and founder, Rossy Ogawa, whom she used to work for as Stardom.

== Mixed martial arts and shoot boxing ==
While signed to JDStar as a professional wrestler, Kakimoto also began looking for opportunities to transition into mixed martial arts (MMA) with the Smackgirl promotion. She made her MMA debut on August 17, 2005, losing to Chiaki Kawabita via submission to an armbar. Kakimoto returned to Smackgirl on November 29, using an armbar herself to earn a submission win over Emi Kuroda. Kakimoto's third and final MMA fight took place on September 15, 2006, when she scored a unanimous decision win over Maiko Takahashi.

Afterwards, Kakimoto switched from MMA to shoot boxing, making her debut on November 24, 2008, against fellow professional wrestler, seasoned mixed martial artist and reigning UKF Women's MMA Intercontinental Champion Mai Ichii. After a close three-round fight, which saw Ichii given a yellow card for punching Kakimoto during a clean break, one judge scored the match for Kakimoto, one for Ichii and the third scored it a draw, leading to a fourth sudden death round. Kakimoto dominated the final round over her exhausted opponent and won it on the cards of all three judges, earning an upset victory over Ichii. To coincide with her retirement from professional wrestling, Kakimoto also retired from shoot boxing, taking part in her final match on February 13, 2010, when she was defeated by Syuri via majority decision.

== As a trainer ==
From its inception in 2010, Fuka acted as a trainer for World Wonder Ring Stardom.

=== Wrestlers trained ===
- Act Yasukawa
- Arisa Hoshiki
- Arisu Nanase
- AZM
- Eri Susa
- Hanan
- HARUKAZE
- Hazuki
- Hiromi Mimura
- Jungle Kyona
- Kairi Sane
- Koguma
- Kris Wolf
- Leo Onozaki
- Mayu Iwatani
- Momo Watanabe
- Nao Yamaguchi
- Natsuko Tora
- Natsumi Sumikawa
- Ruaka
- Saki Kashima
- Shiki Shibusawa
- Starlight Kid
- Takumi Iroha
- Yoko Bito
- Yoshiko
- Yui Yokoo
- Yuna Manase
- Yuzuki Aikawa

== Personal life ==
Kakimoto married kickboxer Ikki on June 19, 2017, six months after their first meeting in December 2016. On June 14, 2018, Kakimoto posted an update on her Twitter account, announcing the birth of her first child, a baby boy.

== Championships and accomplishments ==
- European Wrestling Association
  - EWA World Ladies Championship (1 time)
- JDStar
  - Princess of Ketsudeka Championship (1 time)
  - Princess of Pro-Wrestling Championship (1 time)
  - TWF World Tag Team Championship (1 time) – with Shuu Shibutani
  - League Princess (2006)
- Nikkan Sports
  - Joshi Puroresu Best Bout Award (2010) vs. Nanae Takahashi on March 28
- Último Dragón Fiesta
  - Dragon Mixture Tournament (2006) – with Daichi Kakimoto, Kota Ibushi and Seiya Morohashi

=== Mixed martial arts record ===
Professional record breakdown
3 matches	2 wins	1 loss
By submission	1	1
By decision	1	0

Res.	Record	Opponent	Method	Event	Date	Round	Time	Location	Notes
Win	2–1	Maiko Takahashi	Decision (unanimous)	Smackgirl: Women Hold Their Ground	September 15, 2006	2	5:00	Tokyo, Japan	
Win	1–1	Emi Kuroda	Submission (armbar)	Smackgirl: Lightweight Anniversary	November 29, 2005	2	1:37	Tokyo, Japan	
Loss	0–1	Chiaki Kawabita	Submission (armbar)	Smackgirl: Dynamic!!	August 17, 2005	1	2:50	Tokyo, Japan	

Kickboxing record
2 Fights, 1 Wins, 1 Losses, 0 Draws
Result	Record	Opponent	Method	Event	Date	Round	Time	Location	Notes
Loss	1–1	Syuri	Decision (majority)	Shoot Boxing 25th Anniversary Series	February 13, 2010	3	3:00	Tokyo, Japan	Shoot boxing rules.
Win	1–0	Mai Ichii	Decision (unanimous)	Shoot Boxing World Tournament S-Cup 2008	November 24, 2008	3+1	2:00	Saitama, Japan	Shoot boxing rules.

Legend: Win Loss Draw/No contest
