= Takumi Iroha =

Japanese professional wrestler

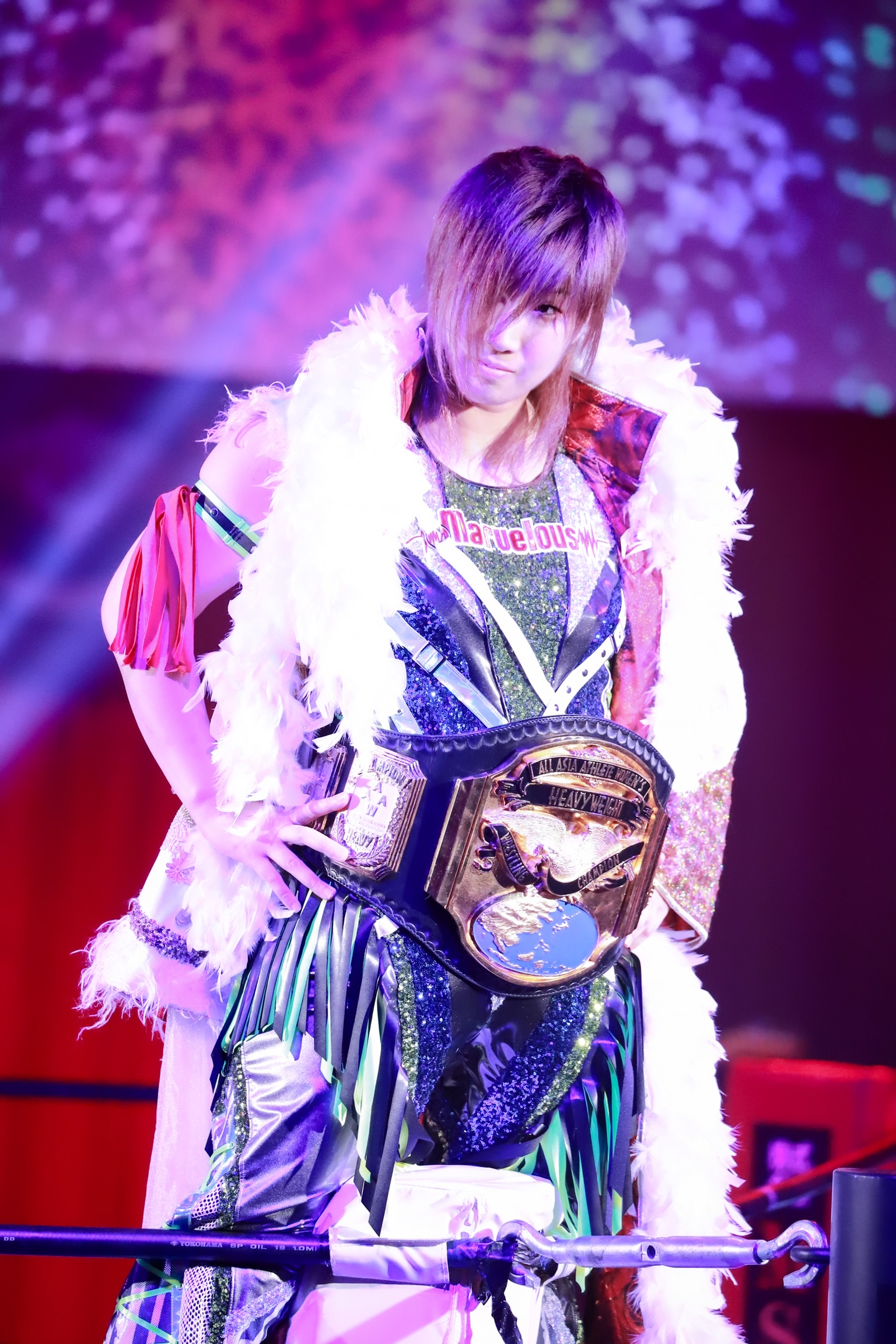
- Iroha in August 2022

Personal information
- Born: Takumi Iroha (彩羽匠, Iroha Takumi); January 4, 1993 (age 33) Fukuoka, Japan

Professional wrestling career
- Ring name: Takumi Iroha
- Billed height: 170 cm (5 ft 7 in)
- Billed weight: 65 kg (143 lb)
- Trained by: Fuka Kakimoto; Megumi Fujii; Chigusa Nagayo
- Debut: April 29, 2013

Takumi Iroha (彩羽匠, Iroha Takumi; born January 4, 1993) is a Japanese professional wrestler working for Marvelous That's Women Pro Wrestling, where she is the current two-time AAAW Single Champion and former two-time AAAW Tag Team Champions. She also competes in Seadlinnng, where she is a former Beyond the Sea Champion. In Pro Wrestling Noah, she is a former GHC Women's Champion.

Iroha was trained by Fuka Kakimoto and made her debut in April 2013 for World Wonder Ring Stardom, where she is a former Artist of Stardom Champion. She would leave the promotion in 2015, and joined Chigusa Nagayo's Marvelous promotion, where she competes to this day. She is also known for her work in Seadlinng, Pro Wrestling Wave, and Pro Wrestling Noah, ROH.

== Career ==
Iroha became a fan of pro wrestling in high school after watching a video of The Crush Gals, and idolised Chigusa Nagayo as a teenager. In 2012, while attending university, she attended a World Wonder Ring Stardom event in Korakuen Hall, and decided to drop out of college to pursue a career in pro wrestling. After dropping out of school, she moved to Tokyo and applied to join the Stardom dojo, where she was accepted after passing a tryout.

=== World Wonder Ring Stardom (2013–2015) ===
Iroha was revealed to the public as a trainee on February 29, 2013, and her debut was announced to take place at Stardom's first show in Ryogoku Kokugikan on April 29. She was allowed to pick any opponent, and challenged Meiko Satomura, who accepted. Iroha was defeated by sleeper hold, but showed promise and was able to utilise a triangle choke, albeit briefly. On August 17, she got her first championship opportunity, challenging Dark Angel for the Wonder of Stardom Championship. She once again challenged for the title in February 2014, this time losing to Act Yasukawa. On June 1 at Natsuki Taiyo's retirement show, she competed in her biggest match to date, losing to Io Shirai for the World of Stardom Championship. In December, she won her first championship, teaming with Shirai and Mayu Iwatani as Heisei-gun to win the Artist of Stardom Championship. After 2 years with Stardom, Iroha left the promotion on February 22, 2015, to sign and train with Chigusa Nagayo in the Marvelous promotion.

=== Marvelous (2015–present) ===
==== Early Iroha appearances (2015–2025) ====
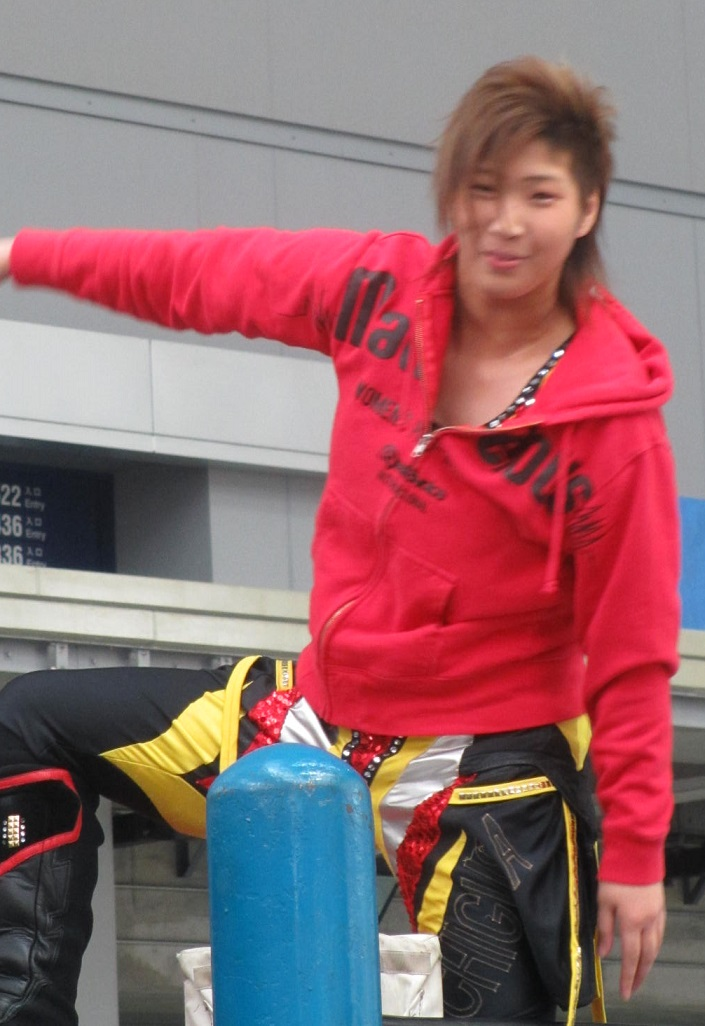
Iroha in December 2016

Iroha debuted for Marvelous That's Women Pro Wrestling as a full time roster member in 2015, after finishing commitments to Stardom. She was adopted as Chigusa Nagayo's protege, and would also become her tag team partner, teaming with her in Marvelous and Pro Wrestling Zero1 in 2017, including in a current blast death match where they teamed with Atsushi Onita in May 2017. In September, she won her first title outside of Stardom, teaming with Rin Kadokura as New-Tra to beat Hiroe Nagahama and Kaho Kobayashi for the Pro Wrestling Wave Tag Team Championship. They held the titles until January when they were forced to vacate due to an injury to Iroha. She also made a one off return to Stardom in October 2017, going to a time limit draw with Yoko Bito for the Wonder of Stardom Championship. She returned to the ring in April, and in June, won her first singles title, beating Misaki Ohata for the Regina Di Wave Title. In May 2019, she won Seadlinnng's Beyond The Sea Championship, defeating Nanae Takahashi.

On January 10, 2022, Iroha defeated Chihiro Hashimoto to win the reactivated AAAW Single Championship, which was previously the main title in Gaea Japan. On May 1, during Marvelous 6th Anniversary show, Iroha had her first successful title defense against Yuu.

==== Rush Spark (2025–present) ====
On 5 May 2025 Sareee partner for a match against, debuting in Rush Spark events and winning the AAAW Tag Team Championship on May 20, 2025, against Ryo Mizunami and Sonoko Kato, positioning her as a foundational figure in the new promotion's launch, on 28 December 2025, on June 18, 2026 ROH x CMLL x Stardom Global Wars Cincinnati at Iroha make debut, against Hyan.

=== Return to Stardom (2021) ===
Iroha returned to Stardom as the mystery competitor of the 5 Star Grand Prix of 2021. She fought in the "Blue Stars" Block, scoring a total of 11 points after going against the winner of the block Syuri, Saya Kamitani, Konami, Utami Hayashishita, Tam Nakano, Maika, Unagi Sayaka, AZM and Ruaka. Since then, she continued making sporadic appearances for the promotion such as at Stardom 10th Anniversary Grand Final Osaka Dream Cinderella on October 9, 2021 where she unsuccessfully challenged Utami Hayashishita for the World of Stardom Championship. At Osaka Super Wars, the last event of the Stardom Super wars trilogy which took place on December 18, 2021, Iroha teamed up with Rin Kadokura and Maria as Team Marvelous and competed in a ¥10 Million Unit Tournament, falling short in the semi-finals against MaiHimePoi (Maika, Natsupoi and Himeka) in a match which was also for the Artist of Stardom Championship. At Stardom Dream Queendom on December 29, 2021, Iroha teamed up with Mayu Iwatani to defeat Momo Watanabe and Hazuki.

== Championships and accomplishments ==
- Marvelous That's Women Pro Wrestling
  - AAAW Single Championship (2 times, current)
  - AAAW Tag Team Championship (2 times) – with Chikayo Nagashima (1), Sareee (1)
- Seadlinnng
  - Beyond the Sea Single Championship (1 time)
- Pro Wrestling Illustrated
  - Ranked No. 80 of the top 250 female wrestlers in the PWI Women's 250 in 2024
- Pro Wrestling Noah
  - GHC Women's Championship (1 time)
- Pro Wrestling Wave
  - Catch the Wave (2019)
  - Regina Di Wave Championship (2 times)
  - Wave Tag Team Championship (1 time)
- Warriors of Wrestling
  - WOW Women's Championship (1 time)
- West Coast Pro Wrestling
  - West Coast Pro Women's Championship (1 time)
- World Wonder Ring Stardom
  - Artist of Stardom Championship (1 time) – with Io Shirai and Mayu Iwatani
  - Stardom Rookie of the Year (2013)
  - 5★Star GP Award (1 time)
    - 5★Star GP Blue Stars Best Match Award (2021) vs. Syuri on September 25
  - Stardom Year-End Award (2 times)
    - Best Match Award (2014) with Risa Sera vs. Kairi Hojo and Nanae Takahashi on December 23
    - Best Match Award (2017) vs. Yoko Bito on October 17
