= West Coast Pro Women's Championship =

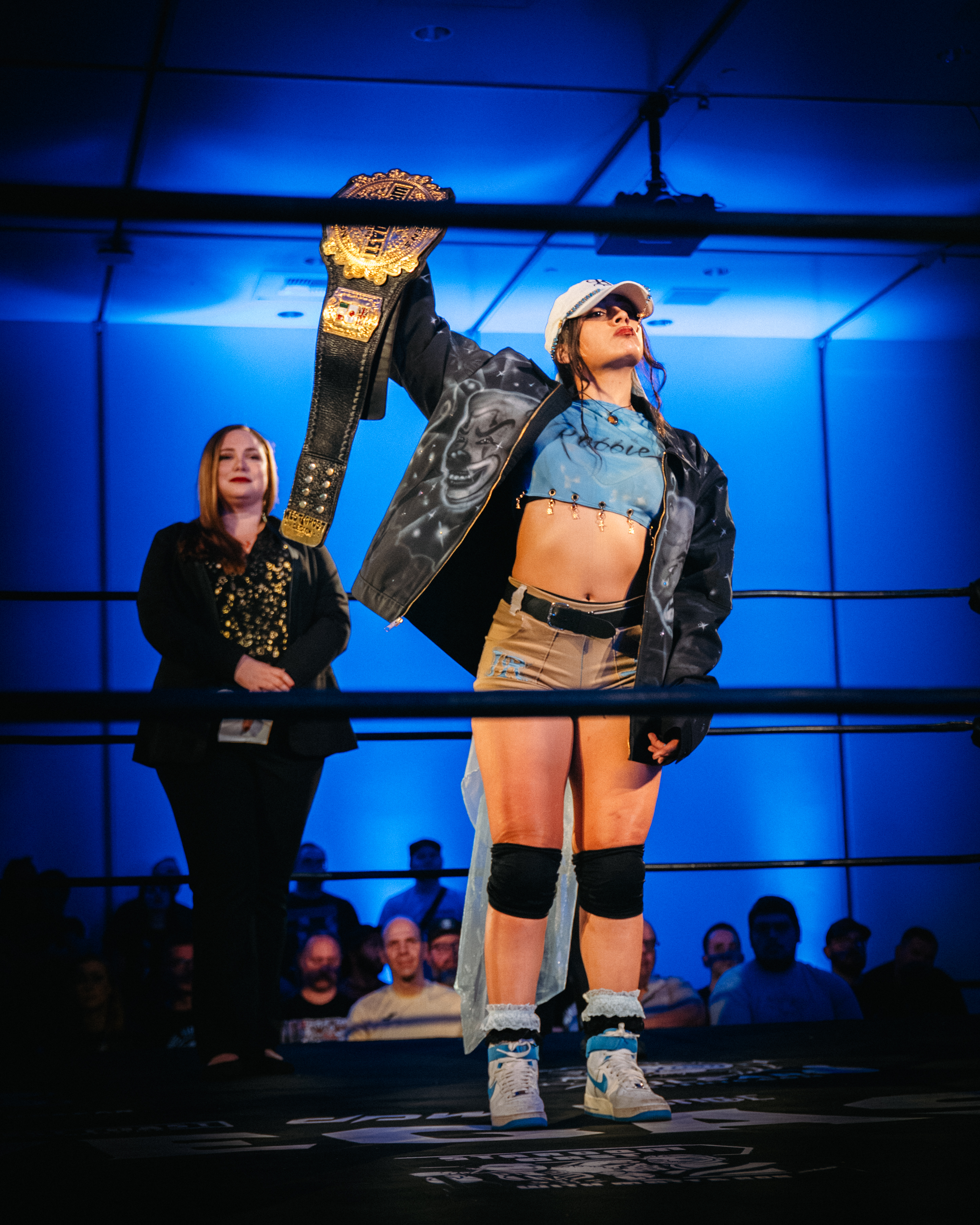
- Johnnie Robbie with the current title design

Details
- Promotion: West Coast Pro Wrestling
- Date established: March 4, 2023
- Current champion: Johnnie Robbie
- Date won: November 13, 2026
Statistics
- First champion: Masha Slamovich
- Most reigns: Johnnie Robbie (2 reigns)
- Longest reign: Takumi Iroha (428 days)
- Shortest reign: Masha Slamovich (159 days)
- Oldest champion: Takumi Iroha (30 years, 7 months and 6 days)
- Youngest champion: Zara Zakher (22 years, 9 months and 13 days)
- Heaviest champion: Takumi Iroha (158 lb (72 kg))
- Lightest champion: Mio Momono (114 lb (52 kg))

The West Coast Pro Women's Championship is a women's professional wrestling championship created and promoted by the American promotion West Coast Pro Wrestling. There have been a total of six reigns shared between five different champions. The current titleholder is Johnnie Robbie who is in her second reign.

== History ==
On March 4, 2023, Masha Slamovich defeated Sandra Moone in a tournament final to become the inaugural champion, and was later presented the title by the WWE Hall of Famer, Lita.

== Reigns ==
Key
No.	Overall reign number
Reign	Reign number for the specific champion
Days	Number of days held
+	Current reign is changing daily

No.	Champion	Championship change			Reign statistics		Notes	Ref.
No.	Champion	Date	Event	Location	Reign	Days	Notes	Ref.
1	Masha Slamovich	March 4, 2023	West Coast Best Coast	San Francisco, CA	1	159	Defeated Sandra Moone in a tournament final to become the inaugural champion.	
2	Takumi Iroha	August 10, 2023	West Coast Cup 2023	San Francisco, CA	1	428		
3	Zara Zakher	October 11, 2024	West Coast Pro 6th Anniversary	San Francisco, CA	1	162		
4	Johnnie Robbie	March 22, 2025	West Coast Best Coast 2025	San Francisco, CA	1	390		
5	Mio Momono	April 16, 2026	West Coast Vs. The World 2026	Las Vegas, NV	1	211		
6	Johnnie Robbie	November 13, 2026	West Coast Pro 8	San Francisco, CA	2	5+		

== Combined reigns ==
As of November 18, 2026.

†	Indicates the current champion

Rank	Wrestler	No. of reigns	Combined days
1	Takumi Iroha	1	428
2	Johnnie Robbie	2	395+
3	Mio Momono	1	211
4	Zara Zakher	1	162
5	Masha Slamovich	1	159
