= AZM (wrestler) =

Japanese professional wrestler

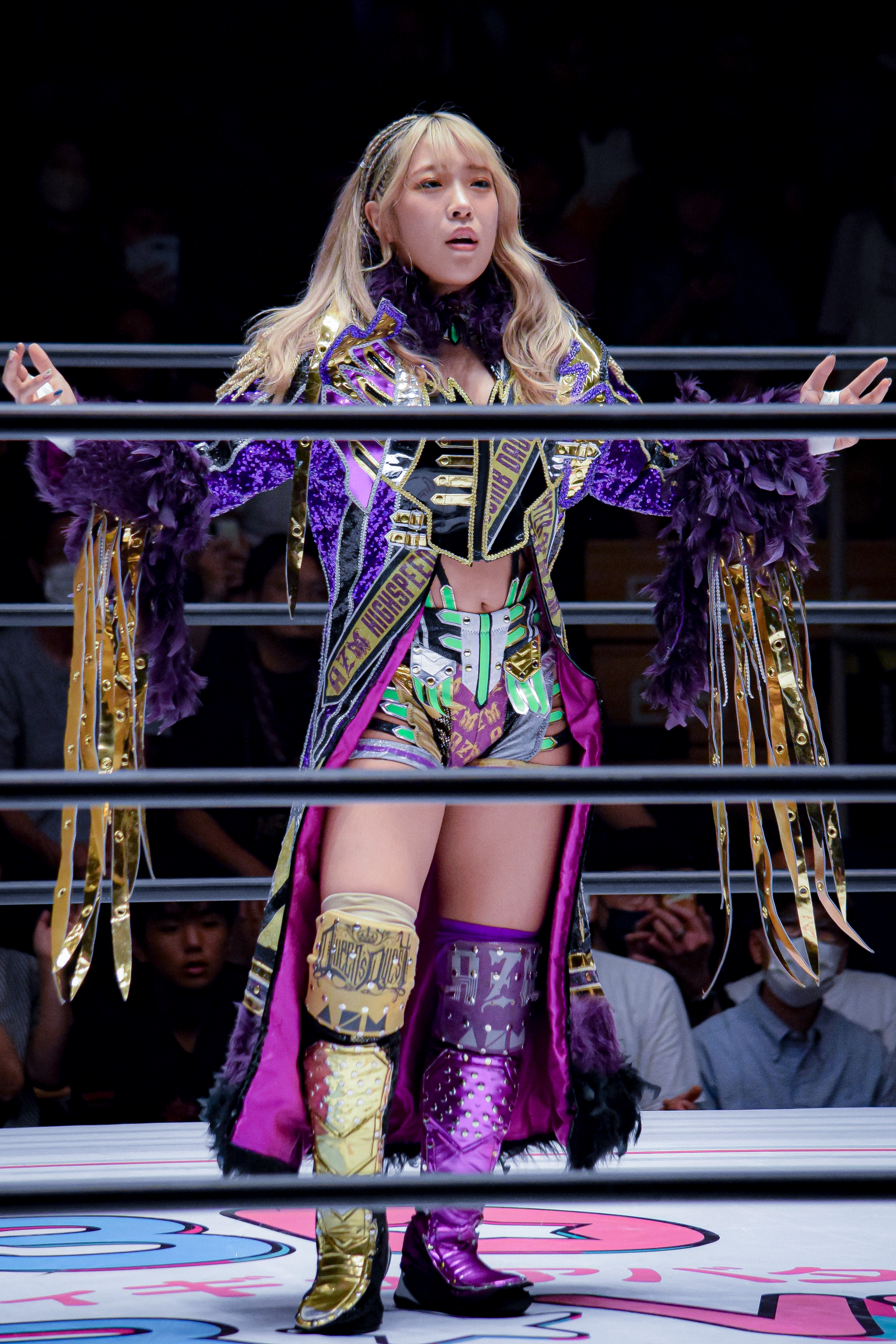
- AZM in 2023

Personal information
- Born: October 1, 2002 (age 24) Tokyo, Japan

Professional wrestling career
- Ring name(s): AZM; Azumi; Mini Iotica
- Billed height: 155 cm (5 ft 1 in)
- Billed weight: 55 kg (121 lb)
- Trained by: Fuka Kakimoto; Io Shirai
- Debut: October 6, 2013

AZM, shortened from Azumi (あずみ; born October 1, 2002), is a Japanese professional wrestler, signed to World Wonder Ring Stardom where she is one half of the current Goddesses of Stardom Champions in her first reign, and a member of the Neo Genesis faction. She also makes appearances for Stardom's sister promotion New Japan Pro-Wrestling under its Strong banner, where she is a former Strong Women's Champion.

She was previously a member of the Queen's Quest faction and its third, and assumed de facto, leader until Utami Hayashishita took over the group. She was in the faction for a total of seven years, having joined in February 2017 when she was brought in by Io Shirai until getting exiled in June 2024 after she took the fall in an elimination tag match against Oedo Tai.

== Professional wrestling career ==
=== World Wonder Ring Stardom (2013–present) ===
==== Early career (2013–2017) ====
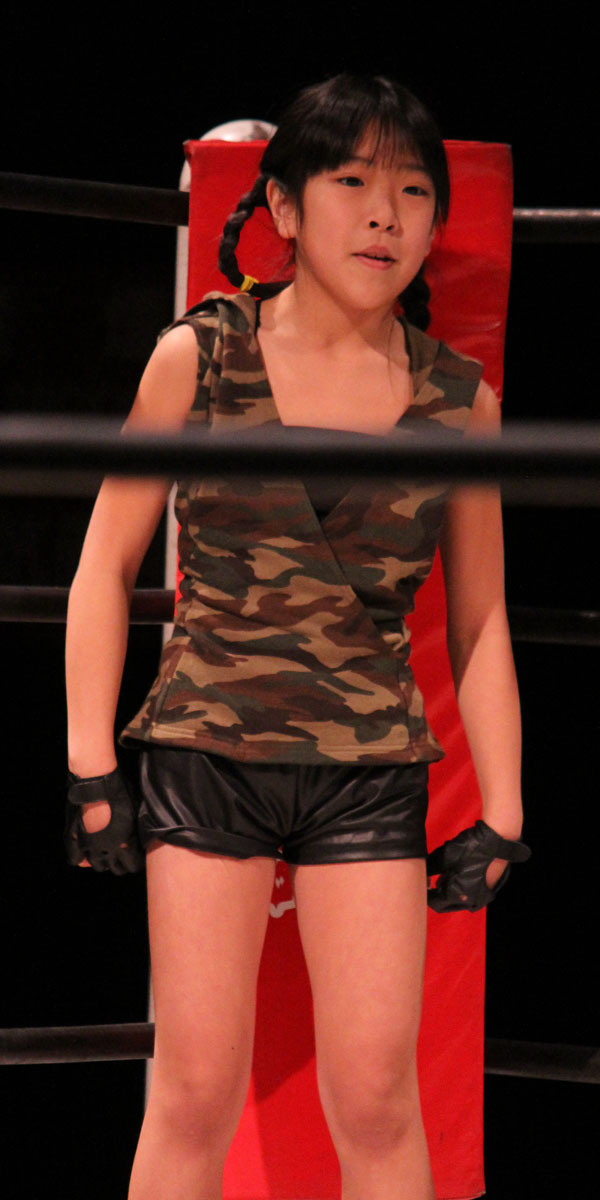
AZM in February 2014 aged 11, five months after her professional wrestling debut

AZM made her professional wrestling debut under the ring name Azumi at Stardom's Season 14 Goddesses In Stars 2013 on October 6, 2013, in a time limit draw against Passion No. 2. She was 11 years old at the time. At Mask Fiesta 2014 on October 26, 2014, AZM wrestled under the ring name Mini Iotica and defeated Green Yuki, Kairian and White Yuki. AZM continued to perform under the Mini Iotica name at Mask Fiesta events throughout the 2010s. At New Years Stars 2016 on January 3, 2016, AZM competed in a 15-woman battle royal where she faced other Stardom wrestlers such as Evie, Kellie Skater, Kris Wolf and Haruka Kato. In February 2016, AZM formed a new stable called Azumi's Army, which was led by herself and Kaori Yoneyama.

==== Queen's Quest (2017–2024) ====
Following a match involving Queen's Quest members Io Shirai and HZK on February 11, 2017, AZM came into the ring and requested to join Queen's Quest, to which Shirai accepted. Following this, AZM adopted AZM as her ring name. AZM won her first title, the Artist of Stardom Championship, at Grows Up Stars 2017 on April 15 alongside HZK and Io Shirai by defeating Oedo Tai (Hana Kimura, La Rosa Negra and Kagetsu). AZM, HZK and Io Shirai lost the Artist of Stardom Championship to Hiromi Mimura, Kairi Hojo and Konami at Golden Week Stars 2017 on May 6, ending their reign after 21 days. AZM won the Artist of Stardom Championship again with HZK and Io Shirai at Shining Stars 2017 on June 4 by defeating Hiromi Mimura, Kairi Hojo and Konami. AZM, HZK and Io Shirai lost the Artist of Stardom Championship to Team Jungle (Hiroyo Matsumoto, Jungle Kyona and Kaori Yoneyama) on June 17, ending their reign after 13 days.

AZM won the Artist of Stardom Championship a third time at Goddess Of Stars 2019 on November 23, 2019, when she teamed up with Momo Watanabe and Utami Hayashishita to defeat Oedo Tai (Andras Miyagi, Kagetsu and Natsu Sumire).

At The Way to Major League on February 8, 2020, AZM, Momo Watanabe and Utami Hayashishita lost the Artist of Stardom Championship to Donna Del Mondo (Giulia, Maika and Syuri), ending their reign after 77 days. AZM won the High Speed Championship on July 26, at Cinderella Summer in Tokyo, by defeating Riho and Starlight Kid in a three-way match. In October and November, AZM and Momo Watanabe teamed up as MOMOAZ to win the 2020 Goddesses of Stardom Tag League. On November 14, AZM and Momo Watanabe unsuccessfully challenged AphrOditE for the Goddesses of Stardom Championship.

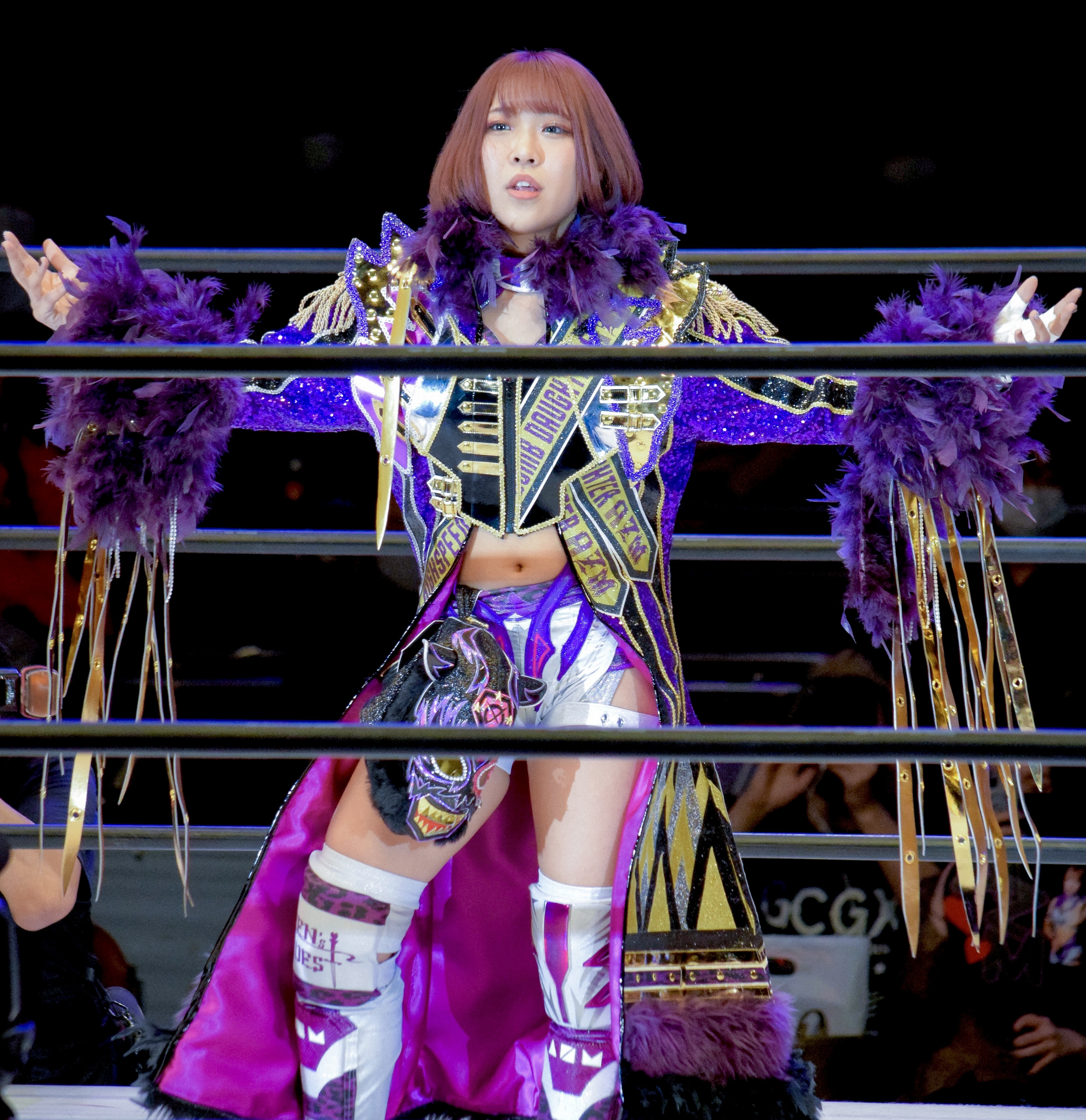
AZM in 2021

At Go To BUDOKAN! Valentine Special on February 13, 2021, AZM unsuccessfully challenged Syuri for the SWA World Championship. On February 21, the tenth night of New Year Stars 2021, AZM participated in a Stardom rumble match won by Ruaka. At All Star Dream Cinderella on March 3, AZM lost the High Speed Championship to Natsupoi, ending her reign after 220 days and four successful defenses. AZM participated in the 2021 Cinderella Tournament, but was eliminated in the first round by Rina. In July through September, AZM competed in the Blue Stars block of the 2021 5 Star Grand Prix, in which she scored a total of eight points. At the 10th Anniversary Grand Final Osaka Dream Cinderella on October 9, AZM, Momo Watanabe and Saya Kamitani unsuccessfully challenged MaiHimePoi for the Artist of Stardom Championship. At Kawasaki Super Wars on November 3, AZM unsuccessfully challenged Syuri for the SWA World Championship and World of Stardom Championship challenge rights certificate. At Osaka Super Wars on December 18, AZM teamed up with her Queen's Quest stablemates Saya Kamitani and Utami Hayashishita and their leader, Momo Watanabe, to battle Oedo Tai (Konami, Ruaka, Saki Kashima and Starlight Kid) in an elimination tag team match. While down to Watanabe versus Starlight Kid, Watanabe betrayed Queen's Quest by attacking AZM with a steel chair to get herself disqualified so she could join Oedo Tai. Following this, AZM became the most senior member of Queen's Quest, having been recruited by the original leader Io Shirai, and was therefore assumed to be the de facto leader of the unit. At Dream Queendom on December 29, she unsuccessfully challenged Starlight Kid and Koguma in a three-way match for the High Speed Championship.

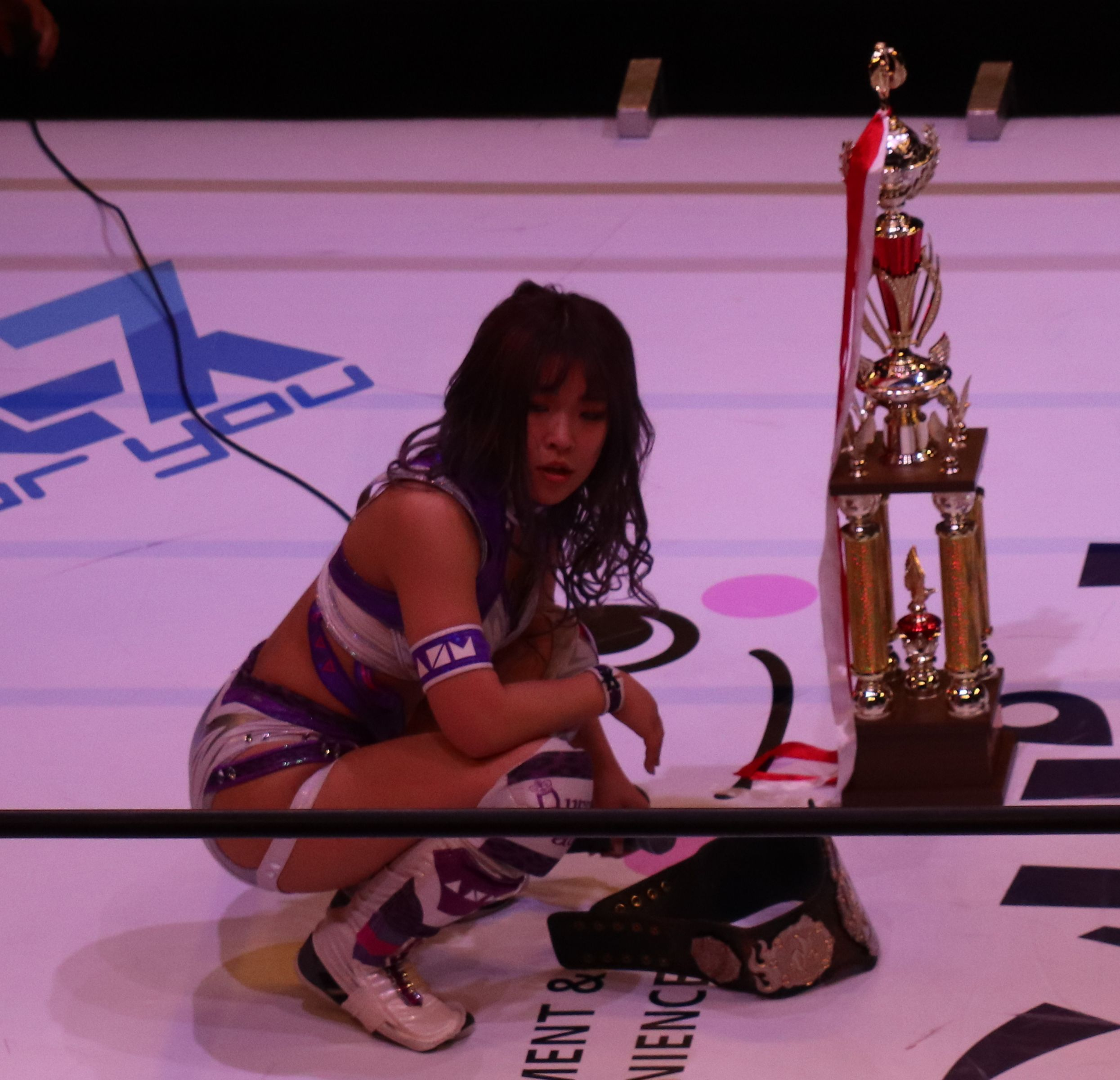
AZM as the High Speed Champion on the second night of the Stardom World Climax 2022 on March 27.

At Nagoya Supreme Fight on January 29, 2022, AZM teamed up with Utami Hayashishita in a grudge match against Momo Watanabe and Starlight Kid which they lost. At Cinderella Journey on February 23, AZM defeated Starlight Kid to win the High Speed Championship for the second time in her career. On the second night on March 27, AZM successfully defended the High Speed Championship against Koguma and Natsupoi. At the 2022 Cinderella Tournament, AZM reached the second round, where she was defeated by Hazuki on April 10. On the last night of the event from April 29, she successfully defended the High Speed Championship against Mei Suruga. On May 15, Queen's Quest elected Utami Hayashishita as the new official leader after she won a five-way match against AZM, Saya Kamitani, Lady C and Hina, meaning AZM was no longer the de facto leader. At Flashing Champions on May 28, AZM successfully defended the High Speed Championship against Thekla. At Fight in the Top on June 26, AZM teamed up with Utami Hayashishita and Saya Kamitami in a losing effort against Stars (Mayu Iwatani, Koguma and Hazuki) in one of the first ever six-woman tag team steel cage matches promoted by Stardom. At Mid Summer Champions in Tokyo on July 9, AZM successfully defended the High Speed Championship against Momo Kohgo. At Stardom in Showcase vol.1 on July 23, she defeated Koguma, Tam Nakano and Momo Watanabe in a four-way falls count anywhere match. At Mid Summer Champions in Nagoya on July 24, AZM successfully defended the High Speed Championship against Rina. In July through October, AZM participated in the Red Stars block of the 2022 5 Star Grand Prix.

On March 4, 2023, AZM had her tenth successful title defense, where she retained her High Speed Championship against Starlight Kid, setting a record for most title defenses of the title. On May 27, at Flashing Champions, AZM lost the title to Saki Kashima in a three-way match, which also involved Fukigen Death, ending her reign at 458 days.

At Stardom The Conversion on June 22, 2024, AZM teamed up with the rest of Queen's Quest's Saya Kamitani, Lady C, Hina and Miyu Amasaki and fell short to Oedo Tai (Natsuko Tora, Thekla, Rina, Momo Watanabe and Ruaka) in a Ten-woman elimination tag team match. Per the stipulation, since Kamitani was the last wrestler eliminated, AZM, Hina, Lady C, and Amasaki all had to leave Queen's Quest.

==== Neo Genesis (2024–present) ====
On the first night of the Stardom Sapporo World Rendezvous from July 27, 2024, AZM, Starlight Kid, Mei Seira, Suzu Suzuki and Miyu Amasaki officiated the birth of the "Neo Genesis" unit as they defeated Stars (Hazuki, Koguma, Hanan, Saya Iida and Momo Kohgo) in a ten-woman tag team match as their inaugural bout. On February 4, 2025, at Stardom Supreme Fight 2025, AZM teamed with Starlight Kid and Amasaki to defeat Cosmic Angels (Tam Nakano, Natsupoi, and Saori Anou) to win the Artist of Stardom Championship for the fourth time in her career.

=== Independent circuit (2017, 2019–2021) ===
At the August 8, 2017 house show of the Marvelous That's Women Pro Wrestling promotion, AZM teamed up with HZK to defeat New-Tra (Rin Kadokura and Takumi Iroha). At Estrella Executive Committee/Stardom/Tokyo Gurentai , a cross-over event produced by World Wonder Ring Stardom in partnership with Tokyo Gurentai on March 14, 2019, AZM competed in a four-way elimination tag team match, where she teamed up with Momo Watanabe and Utami Hayashishita as Queen's Quest, falling short to Oedo Tai (Andras Miyagi, Hazuki and Kagetsu), JAN (Jungle Kyona, Natsuko Tora and Saya Iida) and Stars (Saki Kashima, Starlight Kid and Tam Nakano). AZM competed at Kagetsu Retirement Show ~ Many Face, a freelance event which portraited the last match of Kagetsu from February 24, 2020, where she defeated Kaho Kobayashi and Mei Suruga in a three-way match.

=== New Japan Pro Wrestling (2021–present) ===
AZM worked in an exhibition match for New Japan Pro-Wrestling (NJPW) on the second night of Wrestle Kingdom 15, which took part on January 5, 2021, where she teamed up with Saya Kamitani and Utami Hayashishita as Queen's Quest to defeat Donna Del Mondo's Himeka, Maika, and Natsupoi in a six-person tag team match. On November 20, 2022, AZM participated in the first NJPW and Stardom collaboration event, Historic X-Over, where she alongside Kamitani and Lady C, representing Queen's Quest, defeated Himeka, Mai Sakurai and Thekla, who represented Donna Del Mondo.

On April 8, 2023, at Sakura Genesis, AZM challenged the IWGP Women's Champion Mercedes Moné for the title in a three-way match that also involved Hazuki, but was unsuccessful.

On April 12, 2024, at Windy City Riot, AZM unsuccessfully challenged Stephanie Vaquer for the Strong Women's Championship.

On April 11, 2025, at Windy City Riot, AZM faced Mina Shirakawa to determine the number one contender to face Mercedes Moné for her Strong Women's Championship. Both women were booked to face Moné at Resurgence since the match ended in a double countout. At the event, AZM defeated Moné and Shirakawa to win the title for the first time after pinning Shirakawa.

=== Ring of Honor (2024) ===
On April 5, 2024, at Supercard of Honor, AZM made her Ring of Honor (ROH) debut, teaming with Saya Kamitani and Tam Nakano, in a losing effort against Maika, Mina Shirakawa, and Mei Seira.

=== All Elite Wrestling (2024-2025) ===
On the April 13, 2024 edition of AEW Collision, AZM made her All Elite Wrestling (AEW) debut, in a losing effort against AEW Women's World Champion "Timeless" Toni Storm. AZM made her return to AEW on May 14, 2025, at Dynamite: Beach Break, competing in a four-way match that was won by Mina Shirakawa. After the match, she was attacked by Mercedes Moné, but was saved by Jamie Hayter.

== Championships and accomplishments ==
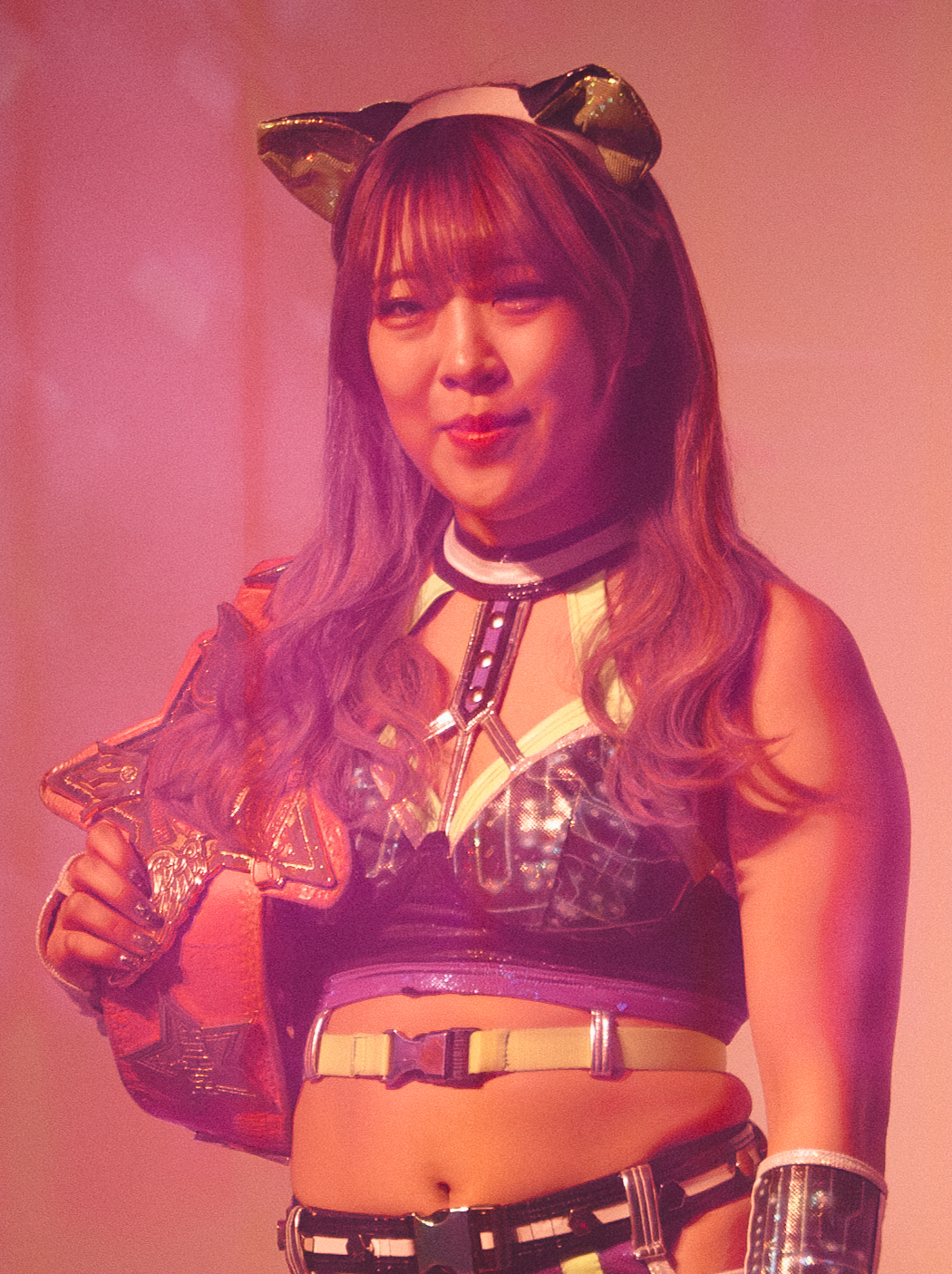
AZM in April 2025 shown with the pink third of the Artist of Stardom Championship.

- New Japan Pro-Wrestling
  - Strong Women's Championship (1 time)
- Pro Wrestling Illustrated
  - Ranked No. 16 of the top 150 female singles wrestlers in the PWI Women's 150 in 2022
  - Ranked No. 20 of the top 50 tag teams in the PWI Tag Team's 50 in 2020 with Momo Watanabe, Utami Hayashishita and Saya Kamitani
- World Wonder Ring Stardom
  - Artist of Stardom Championship (4 times) – with HZK and Io Shirai (2), Momo Watanabe and Utami Hayashishita (1), Starlight Kid and Miyu Amasaki (1)
  - Goddesses of Stardom Championship (1 time, current) – with Miyu Amasaki
  - High Speed Championship (2 times)
  - Goddesses of Stardom Tag League (2020) – with Momo Watanabe
  - 5★Star GP Award (8 times)
    - 5★Star GP Fighting Spirit Award (2022, 2024)
    - 5★Star GP Outstanding Performance (2021)
    - 5★Star GP Technique Awards (2019, 2020, 2023)
    - 5★Star GP Best Match Award (2025) vs. Rina on August 23
    - 5★Star GP Red Stars Best Match Award (2026) vs. Maika on July 20 in Red Stars A
  - Stardom Year-End Award (3 times)
    - Best Technique Award (2019, 2022)
    - Best Unit Award (2023) - as a part of Queen's Quest
