= Stardom 5 Star Grand Prix 2021 =

2021 World Wonder Ring Stardom wrestling event

- Promotional poster

Tournament information
- Sport: Professional wrestling
- Location: Japan
- Dates: July 31, 2021–September 25, 2021
- Tournament format: Two-block round-robin
- Host: World Wonder Ring Stardom
- Participants: 20

Final positions
- Champions: Syuri
- Runner-up: Momo Watanabe

Tournament statistics
- Matches played: 91

Stardom 5 Star Grand Prix 2021 (スターダム5スターグランプリ2021, Sutādamu 5 sutāguranpuri 2021), often stylized as 5★Star GP 2021 was the tenth annual professional wrestling tournament under the Stardom 5Star Grand Prix Tournament branch promoted by the Japanese promotion World Wonder Ring Stardom. It took place between July 31 and September 25, 2021, with a limited attendance due in part to the COVID-19 pandemic at the time.

== Tournament history ==
The Stardom 5 Star Grand Prix is a professional wrestling tournament held each summer by Stardom. Similar to Bushiroad-owned male counterpart New Japan Pro-Wrestling with the G1 Climax tournament, it is currently held as a round-robin tournament with wrestlers split into two pools. The winner of each pool will compete in the final to decide the winner. As is the case with G1 Climax, a win is two points and a draw is one point for each wrestler.

=== Storylines ===
The show featured professional wrestling matches that resulted from scripted storylines, where wrestlers portrayed villains, heroes, or less distinguishable characters in the scripted events that built tension and culminated in a wrestling match or series of matches.

On the sixth night of the tournament which took place in the Korakuen Hall on August 13, it was announced that the shows from August 14 and August 15 were canceled due to a certain number of female wrestlers being identified as contacts for a person infected with COVID-19. On the same night, after losing the Future of Stardom Championship match to Unagi Sayaka, Mai Sakurai was presented as the newest member of Cosmic Angels and was announced to undergo a newcomer "challenge" against ten opponents during the tournament.

After a couple of lockdowns were announced to be taking place during the event, the original schedule had been slightly changed. So due to several wrestlers undergoing home isolation, the shows from August 21 and 22 were also cancelled.

On the eight night from August 29, Hazuki appeared to confront Mayu Iwatani as she was cleared for her in-ring return.

On the ninth night from September 4 it was revealed that Waka Tsukiyama from Actwres girl'Z would make her debut in Stardom. Just as Mai Sakurai, she was announced to undergo a rookie "challenge" against ten different opponents.

The seventeenth night portraited the final of the tournament on September 25 with Syuri defeating Momo Watanabe to win it. She revealed that she will challenge Utami Hayashishita for the World of Stardom Championship on December 29 at "Stardom Dream Queendom". Utami Hayashishita versus Takumi Iroha for the World of Stardom Championship, Tam Nakano versus Mayu Iwatani for the Wonder of Stardom Championship and Syuri against Konami for the SWA World Championship were also announced for the Stardom 10th Anniversary Grand Final Osaka Dream Cinderella pay-per-view from October 9.

== Participants ==
This is a list of participants who changed a couple of times during the event. Despite being listed as a participant, Natsuko Tora was replaced by Fukigen Death after suffering a legitimate knee injury at Yokohama Dream Cinderella 2021 in Summer on July 4. Takumi Iroha from Marvelous That's Women Pro Wrestling was announced as the mystery participant at the July 17 press conference.

The tournament featured twenty wrestlers, being the biggest tournament to date, equally divided into two distinctive blocks with the two winners of their respective blocks moving on to the finals. One mystery competitor, usually a guest from another promotion, is often revealed on the first night of the event. But at Hyakka Ryoran! Press Conference held on July 17, it was revealed that Takumi Iroha was set to make her return to the promotion as the mystery competitor and Fukigen Death would replace Natsuko Tora after the latter's injury.

*Noted underneath are the champions who held their titles at the time of the tournament.

| Wrestler | Unit | Notes |
|---|---|---|
| AZM | Queen's Quest | |
| Giulia | Donna Del Mondo | Goddesses of Stardom Champion; Pulled out of the tournament on September 9 due to injury |
| Himeka | Donna Del Mondo | |
| Fukigen Death | Oedo Tai | Replaced Natsuko Tora |
| Koguma | Stars | |
| Konami | Oedo Tai | |
| Maika | Donna Del Mondo | |
| Mayu Iwatani | Stars | |
| Mina Shirakawa | Cosmic Angels | Artist of Stardom Champion |
| Momo Watanabe | Queen's Quest | |
| Natsuko Tora | Oedo Tai | Pulled out of the tournament due to injury |
| Natsupoi | Donna Del Mondo | |
| Ruaka | Oedo Tai | |
| Saki Kashima | Oedo Tai | |
| Saya Kamitani | Queen's Quest | |
| Starlight Kid | Oedo Tai | High Speed Champion |
| Syuri | Donna Del Mondo | Winner; Goddesses of Stardom Champion; SWA World Champion |
| Takumi Iroha | Unaffiliated | Announced as the "X" (Note: The bold X is the term used by Stardom as a reference for the annual Grand Prix Tournament mystery competitor.) |
| Tam Nakano | Cosmic Angels | Wonder of Stardom Champion; Artist of Stardom Champion |
| Unagi Sayaka | Cosmic Angels | Artist of Stardom Champion; Future of Stardom Champion |
| Utami Hayashishita | Queen's Quest | World of Stardom Champion |

== Results ==
Night 1 (July 31)
| No. | Results | Stipulations | Times |
|---|---|---|---|
| 1^{P} | Oedo Tai (Konami, Saki Kashima, Rina and Ruaka) defeated Queen's Quest (AZM and Hina), Hanan and Lady C | Eight-woman tag team match | 4:15 |
| 2 | Mina Shirakawa defeated Fukigen Death | 5 Star Grand Prix tournament match | 4:39 |
| 3 | Koguma defeated Natsupoi | 5 Star Grand Prix tournament match | 10:16 |
| 4 | Giulia defeated Starlight Kid | 5 Star Grand Prix tournament match | 13:47 |
| 5 | Unagi Sayaka defeated Tam Nakano | 5 Star Grand Prix tournament match | 13:16 |
| 6 | Syuri defeated Saya Kamitani | 5 Star Grand Prix tournament match | 14:37 |
| 7 | Momo Watanabe defeated Mayu Iwatani | 5 Star Grand Prix tournament match | 17:37 |
| 8 | Maika defeated Utami Hayashishita | 5 Star Grand Prix tournament match | 19:26 |
P / – the match was broadcast on the pre-show

Night 2 (August 1)
| No. | Results | Stipulations | Times |
|---|---|---|---|
| 1^{P} | Oedo Tai (Rina and Ruaka) defeated Stars (Hanan and Koguma) and Lady C and Mina Shirakawa | Three-way tag team match | 5:11 |
| 2 | Unagi Sayaka defeated AZM | 5 Star Grand Prix tournament match | 8:21 |
| 3 | Starlight Kid defeated Saki Kashima | 5 Star Grand Prix tournament match | 8:46 |
| 4 | Natsupoi defeated Momo Watanabe | 5 Star Grand Prix tournament match | 9:44 |
| 5 | Tam Nakano defeated Konami | 5 Star Grand Prix tournament match | 10:45 |
| 6 | Utami Hayashishita defeated Saya Kamitani | 5 Star Grand Prix tournament match | 14:19 |
| 7 | Syuri defeated Maika | 5 Star Grand Prix tournament match | 16:38 |
| 8 | Mayu Iwatani defeated Giulia | 5 Star Grand Prix tournament match | 18:30 |
P / – the match was broadcast on the pre-show

Night 3 (August 7)
| No. | Results | Stipulations | Times |
|---|---|---|---|
| 1 | Mina Shirakawa defeated Starlight Kid and Hina | Three-way match | 9:28 |
| 2 | Queen's Quest (Momo Watanabe and Saya Kamitani) defeated Oedo Tai (Konami and Rina) | Tag team match | 7:55 |
| 3 | Stars (Hanan, Koguma and Mayu Iwatani) defeated Donna Del Mondo (Maika and Natsupoi) and Lady C | Six-woman tag team match | 10:26 |
| 4 | Tam Nakano defeated Ruaka | 5 Star Grand Prix tournament match | 7:41 |
| 5 | Saki Kashima defeated Giulia | 5 Star Grand Prix tournament match | 9:59 |
| 6 | Utami Hayashishita defeated Unagi Sayaka | 5 Star Grand Prix tournament match | 11:35 |
| 7 | AZM defeated Syuri | 5 Star Grand Prix tournament match | 13:38 |

Night 4 (August 8)
| No. | Results | Stipulations | Times |
|---|---|---|---|
| 1 | Unagi Sayaka defeated AZM and Lady C | Three-way match | 6:42 |
| 2 | Stars (Hanan, Koguma and Mayu Iwatani) defeated Queen's Quest (Hina, Momo Watanabe and Utami Hayashishita) | Six-woman tag team match | 10:31 |
| 3 | Donna Del Mondo (Giulia and Syuri) defeated Oedo Tai (Konami and Rina) | Tag team match | 9:52 |
| 4 | Maika defeated Ruaka | 5 Star Grand Prix tournament match | 4:44 |
| 5 | Mina Shirakawa defeated Saki Kashima | 5 Star Grand Prix tournament match | 10:12 |
| 6 | Natsupoi vs. Starlight Kid ended in a double count-out | 5 Star Grand Prix tournament match | 9:43 |
| 7 | Saya Kamitani defeated Tam Nakano | 5 Star Grand Prix tournament match | 13:18 |

Night 5 (August 9)
| No. | Results | Stipulations | Times |
|---|---|---|---|
| 1 | Tam Nakano defeated Mina Shirakawa and Hina | Three-way match | 7:52 |
| 2 | Oedo Tai (Saki Kashima, Starlight Kid, Rina and Ruaka) defeated Stars (Hanan, Koguma and Mayu Iwatani) and Lady C | Eight-woman tag team match | 14:35 |
| 3 | Queen's Quest (Momo Watanabe, Saya Kamitani and Utami Hayashishita) defeated Donna Del Mondo (Giulia, Natsupoi and Syuri) | Six-woman tag team match | 13:29 |
| 4 | Konami defeated Unagi Sayaka | 5 Star Grand Prix tournament match | 11:33 |
| 5 | Maika defeated AZM | 5 Star Grand Prix tournament match | 7:58 |

Night 6 (August 13)
| No. | Results | Stipulations | Times |
|---|---|---|---|
| 1 | Mina Shirakawa defeated Syuri, Hanan & Lady C | Four-way match | 4:32 |
| 2 | Queen's Quest (AZM, Hina and Utami Hayashishita) defeated Oedo Tai (Rina, Ruaka and Saki Kashima) | Six-woman tag team match | 8:53 |
| 3 | Unagi Sayaka (c) defeated Mai Sakurai | Singles match for the Future of Stardom Championship | 8:53 |
| 4 | Starlight Kid defeated Fukigen Death | 5 Star Grand Prix tournament match | 5:19 |
| 5 | Saya Kamitani defeated Konami | 5 Star Grand Prix tournament match | 11:04 |
| 6 | Tam Nakano defeated Maika | 5 Star Grand Prix tournament match | 7:37 |
| 7 | Mayu Iwatani defeated Natsupoi | 5 Star Grand Prix tournament match | 10:09 |
| 8 | Giulia defeated Koguma | 5 Star Grand Prix tournament match | 14:31 |
(c) / – the champion(s) heading into the match

Night 7 (August 28)
| No. | Results | Stipulations | Times |
|---|---|---|---|
| 1 | Tam Nakano defeated Lady C | Singles match | 7:14 |
| 2 | Utami Hayashishita defeated Mai Sakurai | Singles match | 8:05 |
| 3 | Natsupoi defeated Fukigen Death | 5 Star Grand Prix tournament match | 3:57 |
| 4 | Konami defeated Ruaka | 5 Star Grand Prix tournament match | 5:19 |
| 5 | Starlight Kid defeated Mina Shirakawa | 5 Star Grand Prix tournament match | 10:11 |
| 6 | Maika vs. Unagi Sayaka ended in a time-limit draw | 5 Star Grand Prix tournament match | 20:00 |
| 7 | Mayu Iwatani defeated Himeka | 5 Star Grand Prix tournament match | 15:39 |

Night 8 (August 29)
| No. | Results | Stipulations | Times |
|---|---|---|---|
| 1 | AZM defeated Hanan | Singles match | 9:00 |
| 2 | Momo Watanabe defeated Mai Sakurai | Singles match | 8:31 |
| 3 | Fukigen Death defeated Himeka | 5 Star Grand Prix tournament match | 4:44 |
| 4 | Unagi Sayaka (c) defeated Rina | Singles match for the Future of Stardom Championship | 9:55 |
| 5 | Mayu Iwatani defeated Lady C | Singles match | 9:12 |
| 6 | Takumi Iroha defeated Maika | 5 Star Grand Prix tournament match | 13:45 |
| 7 | Starlight Kid defeated Natsupoi (c) | Singles match for the High Speed Championship | 16:59 |
(c) / – the champion(s) heading into the match

Night 9 (September 4)
| No. | Results | Stipulations | Times |
|---|---|---|---|
| 1 | Fukigen Death defeated Hanan | Singles match | 6:06 |
| 2 | Unagi Sayaka vs. Natsupoi ended in a double countout | Singles match | 8:26 |
| 3 | Mayu Iwatani defeated Rina | Singles match | 6:21 |
| 4 | Giulia defeated Mai Sakurai | Singles match | 10:04 |
| 5 | Himeka defeated Mina Shirakawa | 5 Star Grand Prix tournament match | 8:16 |
| 6 | Konami defeated Takumi Iroha | 5 Star Grand Prix tournament match | 10:41 |
| 7 | Syuri vs. Utami Hayashishita ended in a time-limit draw | 5 Star Grand Prix tournament match | 20:00 |

Night 10 (September 6)
| No. | Results | Stipulations | Times |
|---|---|---|---|
| 1 | Maika defeated Mai Sakurai | Singles match | 6:20 |
| 2 | Unagi Sayaka (c) defeated Waka Tsukiyama | Singles match for the Future of Stardom Championship | 8:48 |
| 3 | Saya Kamitani defeated Ruaka | 5 Star Grand Prix tournament match | 7:40 |
| 4 | Momo Watanabe defeated Fukigen Death | 5 Star Grand Prix tournament match | 1:24 |
| 5 | Momo Watanabe defeated Saki Kashima | 5 Star Grand Prix tournament match | 5:34 |
| 6 | Himeka Arita defeated Natsupoi | 5 Star Grand Prix tournament match | 12:12 |
| 7 | Giulia defeated Mina Shirakawa | 5 Star Grand Prix tournament match | 5:33 |
| 8 | Koguma defeated Starlight Kid | 5 Star Grand Prix tournament match | 12:00 |
| 9 | Konami defeated Syuri | 5 Star Grand Prix tournament match | 13:14 |
| 10 | Takumi Iroha defeated Tam Nakano | 5 Star Grand Prix tournament match | 14:54 |
(c) / – the champion(s) heading into the match

Night 11 (September 11)
| No. | Results | Stipulations | Times |
|---|---|---|---|
| 1 | Natsupoi defeated Rina | Singles match | 6:08 |
| 2 | Koguma defeated Lady C | Singles match | 6:04 |
| 3 | Tam Nakano defeated Waka Tsukiyama | Singles match | 8:37 |
| 4 | Syuri defeated Mai Sakurai | Singles match | 7:59 |
| 5 | Fukigen Death defeated Mayu Iwatani by disqualification | 5 Star Grand Prix tournament match | 3:57 |
| 6 | Utami Hayashishita defeated AZM | 5 Star Grand Prix tournament match | 8:50 |
| 7 | Saya Kamitani vs. Takumi Iroha ended in a double count-out | 5 Star Grand Prix tournament match | 13:08 |
| 8 | Himeka defeated Momo Watanabe | 5 Star Grand Prix tournament match | 15:57 |

Night 12 (September 12)
| No. | Results | Stipulations | Times |
|---|---|---|---|
| 1 | Utami Hayashishita defeated Lady C | Singles match | 6:31 |
| 2 | Mina Shirakawa defeated Waka Tsukiyama | Singles match | 9:10 |
| 3 | Natsupoi defeated Mai Sakurai | Singles match | 8:09 |
| 4 | Takumi Iroha defeated Ruaka | 5 Star Grand Prix tournament match | 8:20 |
| 5 | Momo Watanabe defeated Koguma | 5 Star Grand Prix tournament match | 9:14 |
| 6 | Tam Nakano defeated AZM | 5 Star Grand Prix tournament match | 12:20 |
| 7 | Syuri defeated Unagi Sayaka | 5 Star Grand Prix tournament match | 11:17 |
| 8 | Saya Kamitani defeated Maika | 5 Star Grand Prix tournament match | 11:11 |

Night 13 (September 16)
| No. | Results | Stipulations | Times |
|---|---|---|---|
| 1 | Hanan defeated Lady C | Singles match | 6:27 |
| 2 | Starlight Kid defeated Waka Tsukiyama | Singles match | 9:44 |
| 3 | Himeka defeated Mai Sakurai | Singles match | 8:11 |
| 4 | Natsupoi defeated Saki Kashima | 5 Star Grand Prix tournament match | 5:24 |
| 5 | Momo Watanabe defeated Mina Shirakawa | 5 Star Grand Prix tournament match | 8:26 |
| 6 | Saya Kamitani defeated AZM | 5 Star Grand Prix tournament match | 8:34 |
| 7 | Takumi Iroha defeated Unagi Sayaka | 5 Star Grand Prix tournament match | 13:34 |
| 8 | Mayu Iwatani vs. Koguma ended in a double count-out | 5 Star Grand Prix tournament match | 10:01 |
| 9 | Konami defeated Utami Hayashishita | 5 Star Grand Prix tournament match | 11:26 |
| 10 | Syuri defeated Tam Nakano | 5 Star Grand Prix tournament match | 12:11 |

Night 14 (September 18)
| No. | Results | Stipulations | Times |
|---|---|---|---|
| 1 | Fukigen Death defeated Lady C | Singles match | 4:15 |
| 2 | Syuri defeated Waka Tsukiyama | Singles match | 6:07 |
| 3 | Konami defeated Mai Sakurai | Singles match | 7:16 |
| 4 | Unagi Sayaka defeated Ruaka by disqualification | 5 Star Grand Prix tournament match | 7:40 |
| 5 | Koguma defeated Saki Kashima | 5 Star Grand Prix tournament match | 7:01 |
| 6 | Mayu Iwatani defeated Mina Shirakawa | 5 Star Grand Prix tournament match | 9:00 |
| 7 | AZM defeated Takumi Iroha | 5 Star Grand Prix tournament match | 8:55 |
| 8 | Starlight Kid defeated Himeka | 5 Star Grand Prix tournament match | 11:31 |

Night 15 (September 20)
| No. | Results | Stipulations | Times |
|---|---|---|---|
| 1 | Himeka defeated Hanan | Singles match | 5:57 |
| 2 | Lady C defeated Waka Tsukiyama | Singles match | 6:57 |
| 3 | Saya Kamitani defeated Mai Sakurai | Singles match | 8:25 |
| 4 | Fukigen Death defeated Koguma | 5 Star Grand Prix tournament match | 3:34 |
| 5 | AZM defeated Konami | 5 Star Grand Prix tournament match | 6:20 |
| 6 | Syuri defeated Ruaka | 5 Star Grand Prix tournament match | 6:04 |
| 7 | Starlight Kid defeated Momo Watanabe | 5 Star Grand Prix tournament match | 9:24 |
| 8 | Utami Hayashishita vs. Takumi Iroha ended in a time-limit draw | 5 Star Grand Prix tournament match | 20:00 |
| 9 | Saki Kashima defeated Mayu Iwatani | 5 Star Grand Prix tournament match | 7:47 |

Night 16 (September 23)
| No. | Results | Stipulations | Times |
|---|---|---|---|
| 1 | Mayu Iwatani defeated Waka Tsukiyama | Singles match | 7:58 |
| 2 | Himeka defeated Saki Kashima | 5 Star Grand Prix tournament match | 8:56 |
| 3 | Utami Hayashishita defeated Ruaka | 5 Star Grand Prix tournament match | 8:16 |
| 4 | Koguma defeated Mina Shirakawa | 5 Star Grand Prix tournament match | 12:22 |
| 5 | Donna Del Mondo (Syuri, Natsupoi and Maika) defeated Cosmic Angels (Tam Nakano, Unagi Sayaka) and Lady C | Six-woman tag team match | 15:45 |

Night 17 - Final (September 25)
| No. | Results | Stipulations | Times |
|---|---|---|---|
| 1 | Hanan defeated Momo Watanabe and Rina | Three-way match | 5:24 |
| 2 | Mai Sakurai defeated Waka Tsukiyama | Singles match | 5:24 |
| 3 | Mina Shirakawa defeated Natsupoi | 5 Star Grand Prix tournament match | 7:27 |
| 4 | Fukigen Death defeated Saki Kashima | 5 Star Grand Prix tournament match | 1:52 |
| 5 | Koguma defeated Himeka | 5 Star Grand Prix tournament match | 6:19 |
| 6 | Mayu Iwatani defeated Starlight Kid | 5 Star Grand Prix tournament match | 6:19 |
| 7 | AZM defeated Ruaka | 5 Star Grand Prix tournament match | 3:39 |
| 8 | Unagi Sayaka defeated Saya Kamitani | 5 Star Grand Prix tournament match | 11:53 |
| 9 | Maika defeated Konami | 5 Star Grand Prix tournament match | 6:11 |
| 10 | Syuri vs. Takumi Iroha ended in a time-limit draw | 5 Star Grand Prix tournament match | 20:00 |
| 11 | Tam Nakano defeated Utami Hayashishita | 5 Star Grand Prix tournament match | 13:55 |
| 12 | Syuri defeated Momo Watanabe | 5 Star Grand Prix tournament final match | 18:36 |

=== Blocks ===
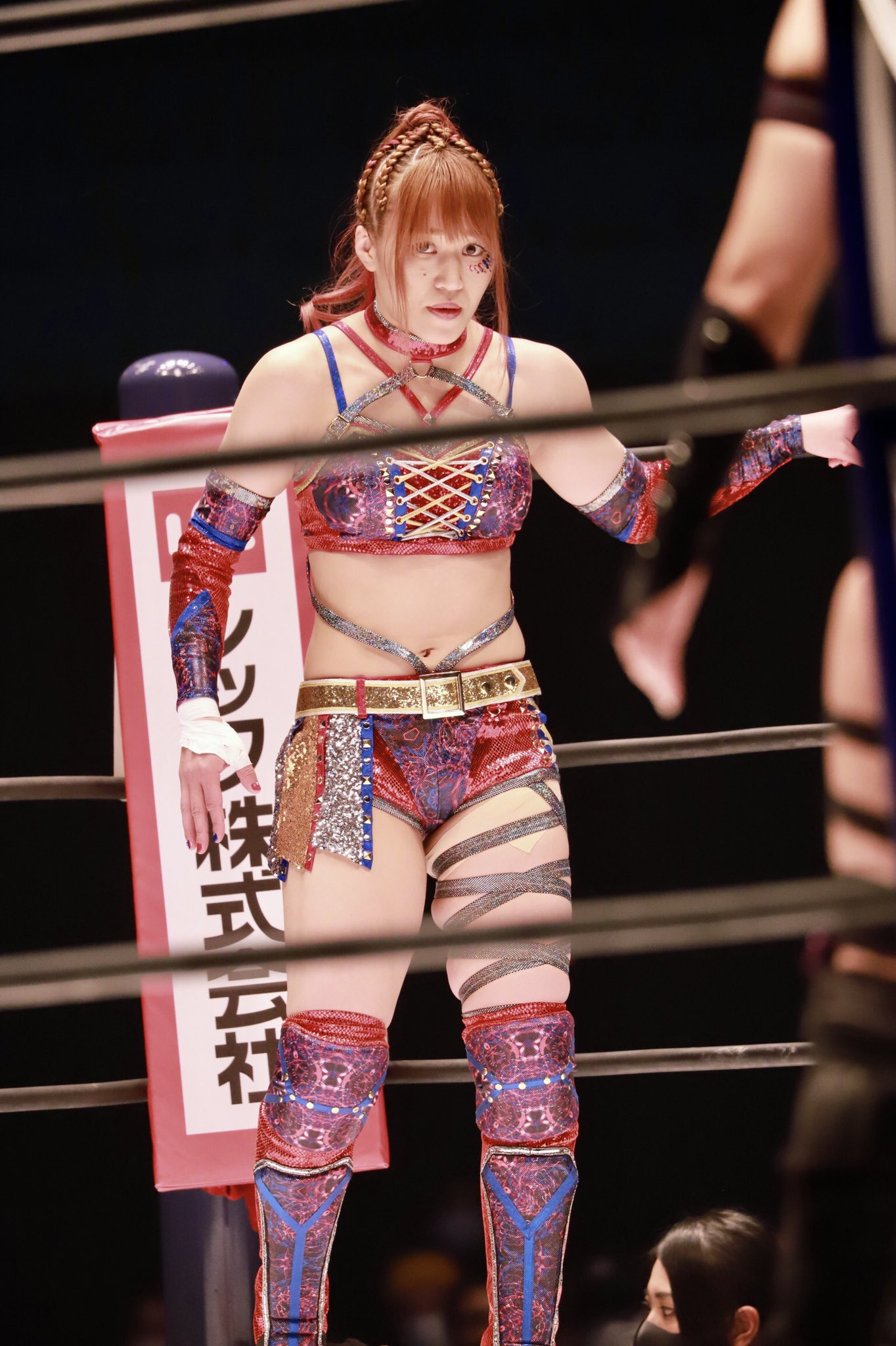
The winner of the 2021 5 Star Grand Prix Syuri

Final standings
| Red Stars | | Blue Stars | |
| Momo Watanabe | 12 | Syuri | 12 |
| Mayu Iwatani | 11 | Saya Kamitani | 11 |
| Koguma | 11 | Takumi Iroha | 11 |
| Starlight Kid | 11 | Konami | 10 |
| Himeka | 10 | Utami Hayashishita | 10 |
| Fukigen Death | 10 | Tam Nakano | 10 |
| Natsupoi | 9 | Maika | 9 |
| Giulia | 6 | Unagi Sayaka | 9 |
| Mina Shirakawa | 6 | AZM | 8 |
| Saki Kashima | 4 | Ruaka | 0 |

| Red Stars | Giulia | Iwatani | Watanabe | Death | Kashima | Kid | Himeka | Natsupoi | Koguma | Shirakawa |
|---|---|---|---|---|---|---|---|---|---|---|
| Giulia | —N/a | Iwatani (18:30) | Watanabe w/o | Death w/o (Note: Giulia sustained a legit injury and withdrew. Himeka, Natsupoi, Momo Watanabe and Fukigen Death were awarded walkover wins against Giulia.) | Kashima (9:59) | Giulia (13:47) | Himeka w/o | Natsupoi w/o | Giulia (14:31) | Giulia (5:33) |
| Iwatani | Iwatani (18:30) | —N/a | Watanabe (17:37) | Death (3:57) | Kashima (7:47) | Iwatani (6:19) | Iwatani (15:39) | Iwatani (10:09) | Draw (10:01) | Iwatani (9:00) |
| Watanabe | Watanabe w/o | Watanabe (17:37) | —N/a | Watanabe (1:24) | Watanabe (5:34) | Kid (9:24) | Himeka (15:57) | Natsupoi (9:44) | Watanabe (9:14) | Watanabe (8:26) |
| Death | Death w/o | Death (3:57) | Watanabe (1:24) | —N/a | Death (1:52) | Kid (5:19) | Death (4:44) | Natsupoi (3:57) | Death (3:34) | Shirakawa (4:39) |
| Kashima | Kashima (9:59) | Kashima (7:47) | Watanabe (5:34) | Death (1:52) | —N/a | Kid (8:46) | Himeka (8:56) | Natsupoi (5:24) | Koguma (7:01) | Shirakawa (10:12) |
| Kid | Giulia (13:47) | Iwatani (6:19) | Kid (9:24) | Kid (5:19) | Kid (8:46) | —N/a | Kid (11:31) | Draw (9:43) | Koguma (12:00) | Kid (10:11) |
| Himeka | Himeka w/o | Iwatani (15:39) | Himeka (15:57) | Death (4:44) | Himeka (8:56) | Kid (11:31) | —N/a | Himeka (12:12) | Koguma (6:19) | Himeka (8:16) |
| Natsupoi | Natsupoi w/o | Iwatani (10:09) | Nastupoi (9:44) | Natsupoi (3:57) | Natsupoi (5:24) | Draw (9:43) | Himeka (12:12) | —N/a | Koguma (10:16) | Shirakawa (7:27) |
| Koguma | Giulia (14:31) | Draw (10:01) | Watanabe (9:14) | Death (3:34) | Koguma (7:01) | Koguma (12:00) | Koguma (6:19) | Koguma (10:16) | —N/a | Koguma (12:22) |
| Shirakawa | Giulia (5:33) | Iwatani (9:00) | Watanabe (8:26) | Shirakawa (4:39) | Shirakawa (10:12) | Kid (10:11) | Himeka (8:16) | Shirakawa (7:27) | Koguma (12:22) | —N/a |
| Blue Stars | Hayashishita | Syuri | Nakano | Kamitani | Maika | AZM | Konami | Ruaka | Sayaka | Iroha |
| Hayashishita | —N/a | Draw (20:00) | Nakano (13:55) | Hayashishita (14:19) | Maika (19:26) | Hayashishita (8:50) | Konami (11:26) | Hayashishita (8:16) | Hayashishita (11:35) | Draw (20:00) |
| Syuri | Draw (20:00) | —N/a | Syuri (12:11) | Syuri (14:37) | Syuri (16:38) | AZM (13:38) | Konami (13:14) | Syuri (6:04) | Syuri (11:17) | Draw (20:00) |
| Nakano | Nakano (13:55) | Syuri (12:11) | —N/a | Kamitani (13:18) | Nakano (7:37) | Nakano (12:20) | Nakano (10:45) | Nakano (7:41) | Sayaka (13:16) | Iroha (14:54) |
| Kamitani | Hayashishita (14:19) | Syuri (14:37) | Kamitani (13:18) | —N/a | Kamitani (11:11) | Kamitani (8:34) | Kamitani (11:04) | Kamitani (7:40) | Sayaka (11:53) | Draw (13:08) |
| Maika | Maika (19:26) | Syuri (16:38) | Nakano (7:37) | Kamitani (11:11) | —N/a | Maika (7:58) | Maika (6:11) | Maika (4:44) | Draw (20:00) | Iroha (13:45) |
| AZM | Hayashishita (8:50) | AZM (13:38) | Nakano (12:20) | Kamitani (8:34) | Maika (7:58) | —N/a | AZM (6:20) | AZM (3:39) | Sayaka (8:21) | AZM (8:55) |
| Konami | Konami (11:26) | Konami (13:14) | Nakano (10:45) | Kamitani (11:04) | Maika (6:11) | AZM (6:20) | —N/a | Konami (5:19) | Konami (11:33) | Konami (10:41) |
| Ruaka | Hayashishita (8:16) | Syuri (6:04) | Nakano (7:41) | Kamitani (7:40) | Maika (4:44) | AZM (7:40) | Konami (5:19) | —N/a | Sayaka (3:39) | Iroha (8:20) |
| Sayaka | Hayashishita (11:35) | Syuri (11:17) | Sayaka (13:16) | Sayaka (11:53) | Draw (20:00) | Sayaka (8:21) | Konami (11:33) | Sayaka (7:40) | —N/a | Iroha (13:34) |
| Iroha | Draw (20:00) | Draw (20:00) | Iroha (14:54) | Draw (13:08) | Iroha (13:45) | AZM (8:55) | Konami (10:41) | Iroha (8:20) | Iroha (13:34) | —N/a |

| Final; September 25 |
| Red | Momo Watanabe | Pin |
| Blue | Syuri | 18:36 |

== See also ==
- G1 Climax
- N-1 Victory
