= Natsupoi =

Japanese professional wrestler (born 1995)

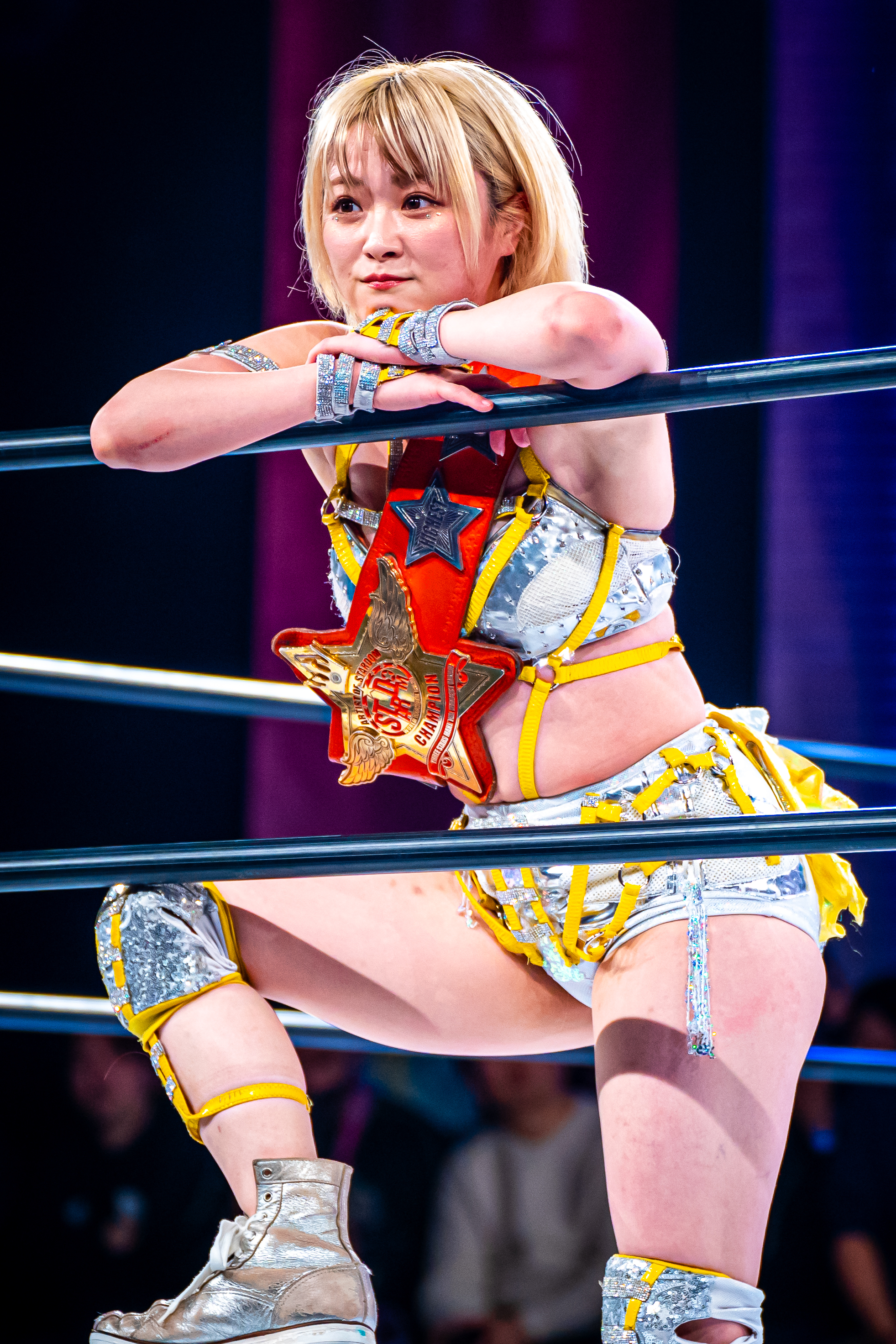
- Natsupoi in January 2025

Personal information
- Born: July 19, 1995 (age 31) Yokohama, Japan
- Spouse: Shingo Takagi (m. 2025)

Professional wrestling career
- Ring name(s): Natsumi Maki; Poiman; Akupoi; Natsupoi
- Billed height: 152 cm (5 ft 0 in)
- Billed weight: 47 kg (104 lb)
- Trained by: Yuna Manase
- Debut: 2015
- Retired: January 3, 2027

Natsumi Takagi (鷹木なつみ, Takagi Natsumi; née Maki (万喜), born July 19, 1995), better known by her ring name Natsupoi (なつぽい, Natsupoi), is a Japanese professional wrestler and singer. She is currently signed to World Wonder Ring Stardom, where she is a member of Cosmic Angels and a former Wonder of Stardom Champion.

Natsupoi is a former two-time Artist of Stardom Champion, one-time Goddesses of Stardom Champion, one-time High Speed Champion and one-time Wonder of Stardom Champion.

== Professional wrestling career ==
=== Independent circuit (2015-2020) ===
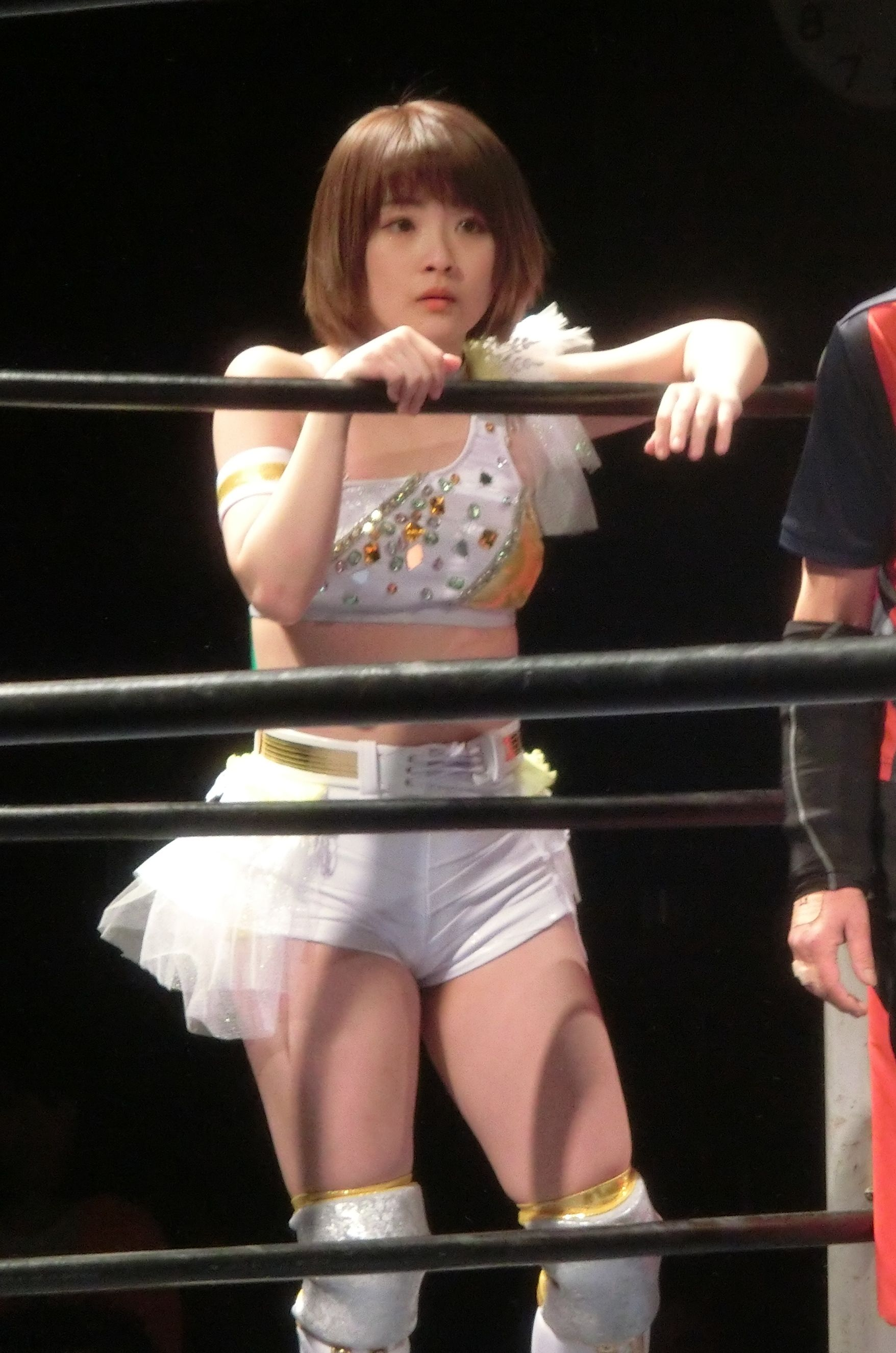
Maki in February 2018

Maki is considered one of the founding pillars of Actwres Girl'Z where she debuted in 2015. Maki would go on to perform numerous times for Actwres girl'Z until 2018. Maki wrestled a couple of matches for Reina, one of them at REINA Year End Battle In Korakuen 2015 on December 26, where she teamed up with Tae Honma in a losing effort to Saori Anou and her trainer Yuna Manase. She participated at Kyoko Kimura Retirement Produce Last Afro on January 22, 2017, where she competed in a 20-man battle royal also involving other popular superstars such as Takashi Sasaki, Munenori Sawa, Yuki Miyazaki, Yuko Miyamoto, Hercules Senga and others. While competing in All Japan Pro Wrestling, she participated at the AJPW Jun Akiyama & Takao Omori 25th Anniversary event from October 21, 2017, where she teamed up with Saori Anou, picking up a victory against Haruka Kato and Saki. At Oz Academy's AKINO Produce 20th Anniversary, an event from on July 8, 2018, which portraited the 20th career anniversary of Mika Akino, she fell short to Mayumi Ozaki. Maki wrestled for DDT Pro-Wrestling at Wrestle Peter Pan 2019 on July 15, where she teamed up with Unagi Sayaka and Yuna Manase in a losing effort to Rika Tatsumi and The Bakuretsu Sisters (Nodoka Tenma and Yuki Aino). She once competed for Sendai Girls' Pro Wrestling, at a house show which took place on February 16, 2020, where she teamed up with Sareee in a losing effort to Dash Chisako and Meiko Satomura.

=== World Wonder Ring Stardom (2016) ===
Maki made her debut in World Wonder Ring Stardom on the fifth night of the Stardom 5th Anniversary which took place on February 21, 2016, where she teamed up with Saori Anou and Starlight Kid, getting defeated by Azumi, Haruka Kato and Kaori Yoneyama in a six-man tag team match. She scored a notable work in the 5STAR Grand Prix 2016 Tournament starting with August 21, placing herself in the Block A, competing against Hiromi Mimura, Kay Lee Ray, Mayu Iwatani, Yoko Bito, Toni Storm and Blue Nikita.

=== JWP Joshi Puroresu (2016-2017) ===
One of her appearances in JWP Joshi Puroresu was at JWP Pure Dream 2016 on November 3, where she unsuccessfully challenged Hana Kimura for both JWP Junior Championship and Princess of Pro Wrestling Championship. At JWP Fly High In The 25th Anniversary Party on April 2, 2017, Maki competed in a 17-woman battle royal, facing notable opponents such as Kayoko Haruyama, Yumiko Hotta, Jaguar Yokota and Command Bolshoi.

=== Tokyo Joshi Pro Wrestling (2019-2020) ===
Maki also competed in Tokyo Joshi Pro Wrestling, promotion for which she made her debut at TJPW Tokyo Joshi Pro '19 on January 4, 2019, where she teamed up with Millie McKenzie, falling short to Bakuretsu Sisters (Nodoka Tenma and Yuki Aino). She made sporadic notable appearances such as at TJPW Pinano Pipipipi Graduation Special where she competed in a gauntlet battle royal also involving the winner Hikari Noa, Yuka Sakazaki, Shoko Nakajima and Mizuki. At TJPW Yes! Wonderland 2019 on May 3, Maki teamed up with Hikari Noa to unsuccessfully challenge Mizuki and Yuka Sakazaki for the Princess Tag Team Championship. The most notable match she had in the promotion was at TJPW Brand New Wrestling 3 from August 25, 2019, where she defeated Gisele Shaw for the vacant International Princess Championship. Maki resigned from TJPW on September 21, 2020, leaving for Stardom.

=== World Wonder Ring Stardom (2020-present) ===
==== Donna Del Mondo (2020-2022) ====
Maki returned to World Wonder Ring Stardom at Stardom Yokohama Cinderella on October 3, 2020, where she defeated Death-yama san and was revealed to be the newest recruit of the Donna Del Mondo stable led by Giulia.

At Stardom Nippon Budokan Great Eve on January 31, 2021, she teamed up with Himeka to unsuccessfully challenge Oedo Tai's Bea Priestley and Konami for the Goddesses of Stardom Championship. Maki won her first title in the promotion, the High Speed Championship at the 10th Anniversary Of Stardom from March 3, 2021, where she defeated AZM. At Stardom Yokohama Dream Cinderella 2021 from April 4, she unsuccessfully challenged Tam Nakano for the Wonder of Stardom Championship. On the first night of the Stardom Cinderella Tournament 2021 from April 10, Maki fell short to fellow stablemate Syuri in a Cinderella Tournament First-round match. At Stardom 5 Star Grand Prix 2021, Maki fought in the "Red Stars" block where she scored a total of 9 points. At Stardom in Nagoya on October 3, 2021, Maki teamed up with Donna Del Mondo stablemates Maika and Himeka to defeat Cosmic Angels (Tam Nakano, Mina Shirakawa and Unagi Sayaka) for the Artist of Stardom Championship. At Stardom 10th Anniversary Grand Final Osaka Dream Cinderella on October 9, they scored the first successful defense by defeating Queen's Quest (Momo Watanabe, AZM and Saya Kamitani). At Tokyo Super Wars on November 27, she fell short to Saya Kamitani and Himeka in a three-way match to determine the number one contender for the Wonder of Stardom Championship. At Osaka Super Wars, the last event from December 18, Maki teamed up with Maika and Himeka and took part in a ¥10 Million Unit Tournament which was also contested for the Artist of Stardom Championship by first defeating Marvelous (Takumi Iroha, Rin Kadokura and Maria) in the semi-finals, and eventually Mayu Iwatani, Hazuki and Koguma in the finals on the same night as a result of a Six-woman tag team ladder match to both retain the titles and win the money prize. At Stardom Dream Queendom on December 29, 2022, Maki alongside Maika and Himeka defended the titles again against Cosmic Angels (Mina Shirakawa, Unagi Sayaka and Mai Sakurai).

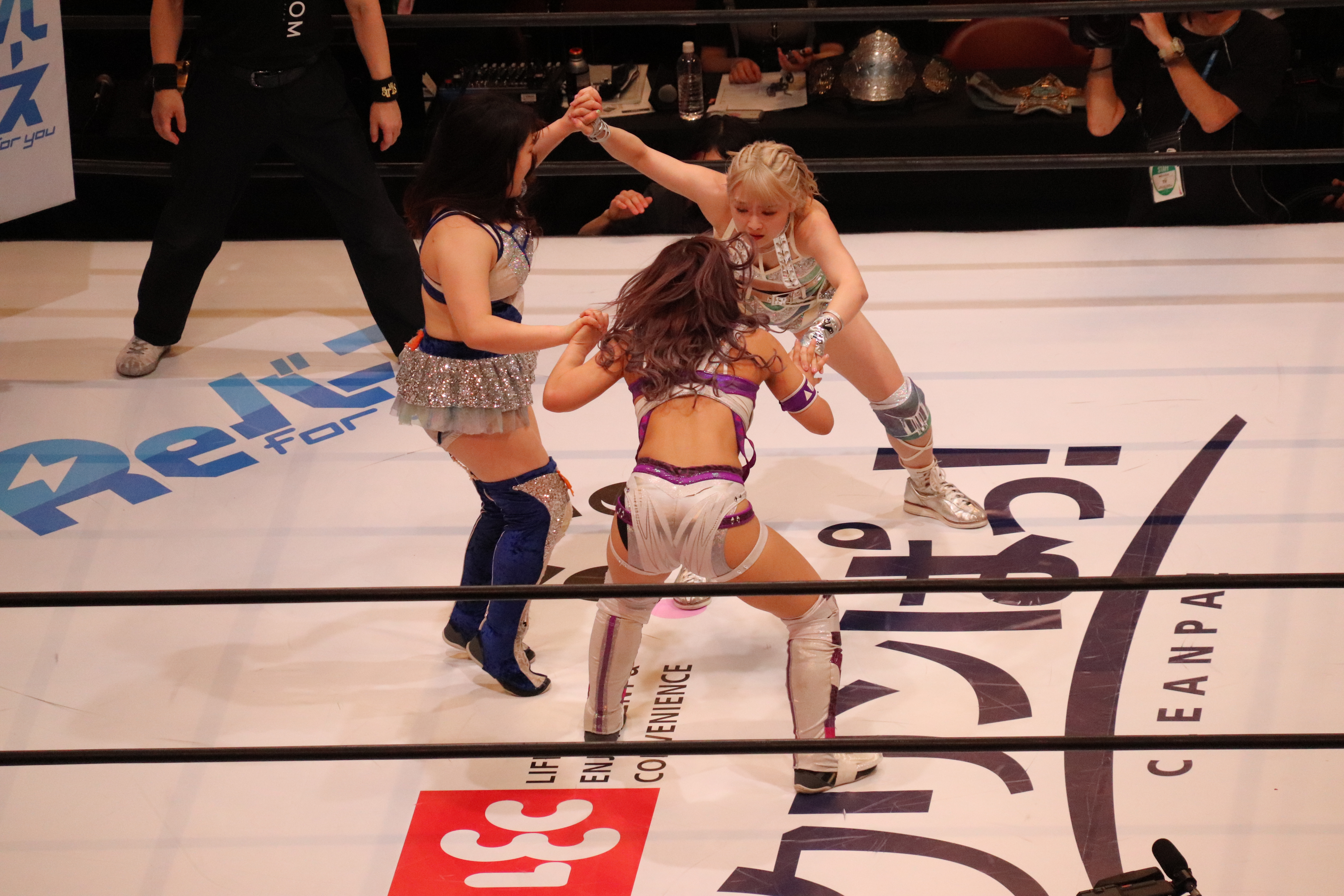
Natsupoi (right) facing AZM and Koguma on the second night of the Stardom World Climax 2022 from March 27.

At Stardom Cinderella Journey on February 23, 2022, Maki unsuccessfully challenged Saya Kamitani for the Wonder of Stardom Championship. On the second night of the World Climax 2022 from March 27, she unsuccessfully challenged AZM and Koguma for the High Speed Championship. At Stardom Cinderella Tournament 2022, Maki made in to he semifinals from April 29 where she fell short to Mirai. At Stardom Flashing Champions on May 28, 2022, Maki, Himeka and Maika dropped the Artist of Stardom Championship to Oedo Tai (Saki Kashima, Momo Watanabe and Starlight Kid). At Stardom Fight in the Top on June 26, 2022, Maki unsuccessfully challenged Tam Nakano in a Steel cage match.

==== New Japan Pro Wrestling (2021-present) ====
On January 5, 2021, in the second night of New Japan Pro Wrestling's Wrestle Kingdom 15, Maki teamed up with Maika and Himeka competing in an exhibition match, losing to Queen's Quest (AZM, Saya Kamitani and Utami Hayashishita).

==== Cosmic Angels (2022-present) ====
At Mid Summer Champions in Tokyo, the first event of the Stardom Mid Summer Champions series which took place on July 9, 2022, Maki teamed up with Donna Del Mondo stablemates Giulia, Maika, Himeka and Mai Sakurai to face Cosmic Angels (Tam Nakano, Unagi Sayaka, Mina Shirakawa, Saki and Hikari Shimizu) in a 10-woman elimination tag team match. Maki betrayed Donna Del Mondo by attacking Giulia mid-match, attracting the latter's unit loss. She subsequently joined Cosmic Angels in the process. At the Stardom 5 Star Grand Prix 2022, Maki fought in the "Blue Goddess" block where she scored a total of 12 points. At Stardom x Stardom: Nagoya Midsummer Encounter, Maki teamed up with Tam Nakano and defeated Hazuki and Koguma to win the Goddesses of Stardom Championship. At Stardom in Showcase vol.2 on September 25, 2022, Maki and Nakano fought Saki and Hikari Shimizu and Mina Shirakawa and Unagi Sayaka into a no contest as a result of a comedic Cosmic Rule Three-Way Match.

On April 23, 2023, at All Star Grand Queendom, Natupoi alongside Kairi and Saori Anou, also known as REStart, defeated Prominence (Hiragi Kurumi, Risa Sera and Suzu Suzuki) to win the Artist of Stardom Championship. On May 27, at Flashing Champions, REStart lost their title to the Baribari Bombers (Giulia, Mai Sakurai and Thekla), ending their reign at 34 days. At Stardom x Stardom: Osaka Summer Team on August 13, Natsupoi and Saori Anou won the Goddesses of Stardom Championship by defeating Rose Gold.

On July 27, 2024, Natsupoi defeated her stablemate, Anou, to win the Wonder of Stardom Championship. At Stardom Dream Queendom 2024, Natsupoi would drop the title to Starlight Kid, ending her reign at 155 days.

== Personal life ==
Natsumi began dating fellow professional wrestler Shingo Takagi after the latter was invited to a Stardom show to promote his anniversary tour in May 2024. The two married at the end of 2025.

== Championships and accomplishments ==
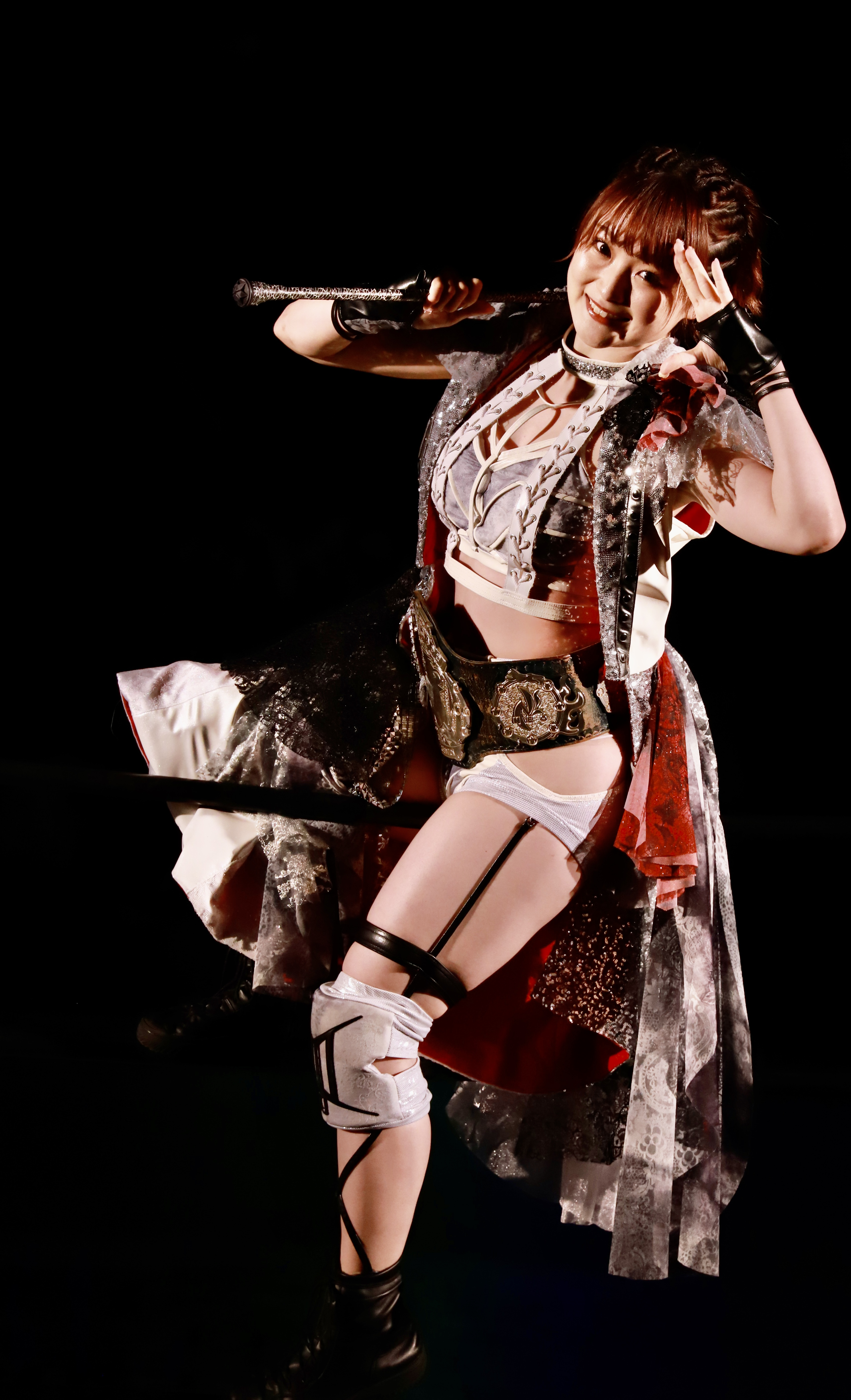
In Stardom, Maki is a former High Speed Champion

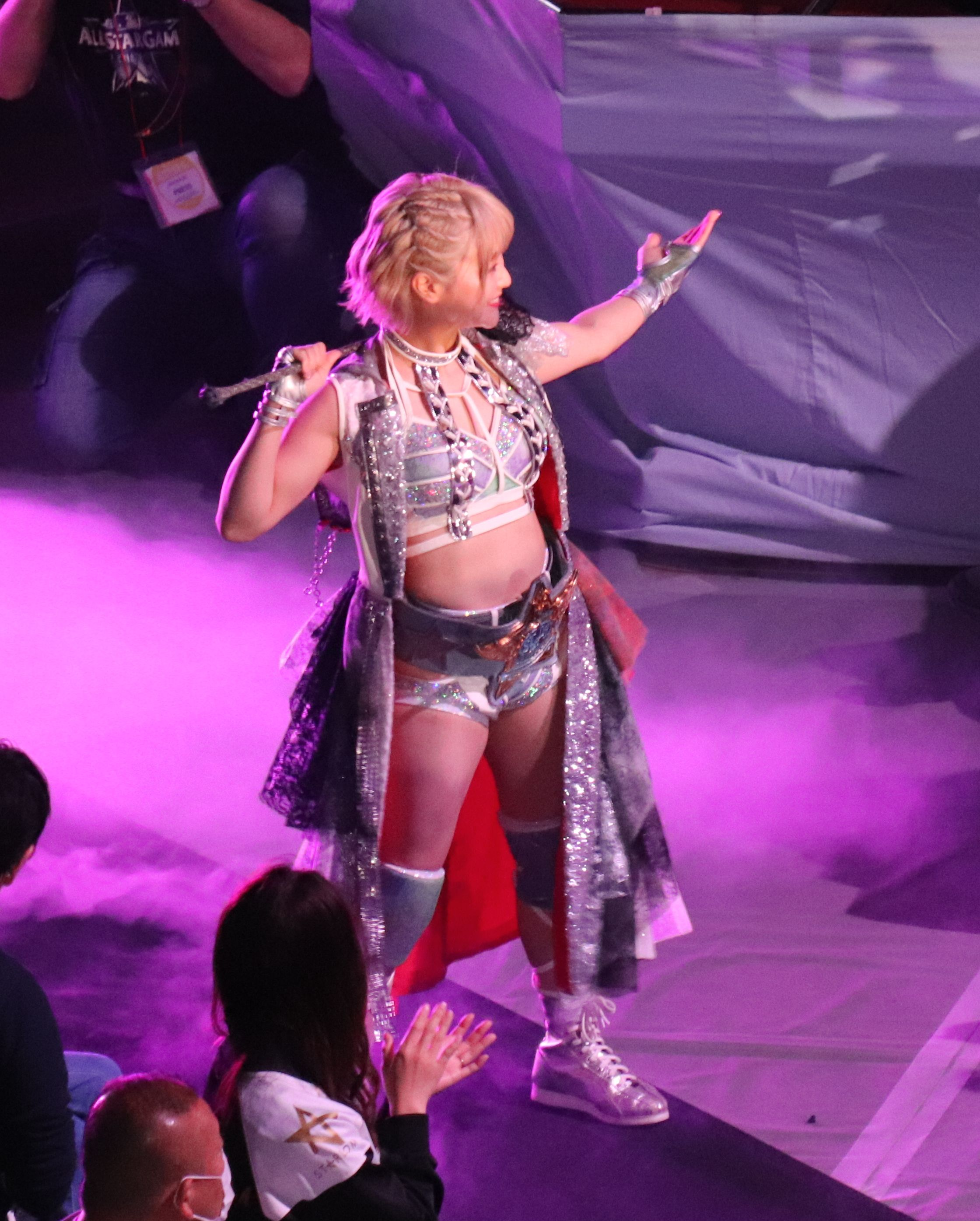
...and a former three-time Artist of Stardom Champion, shown here with the "blue" belt...

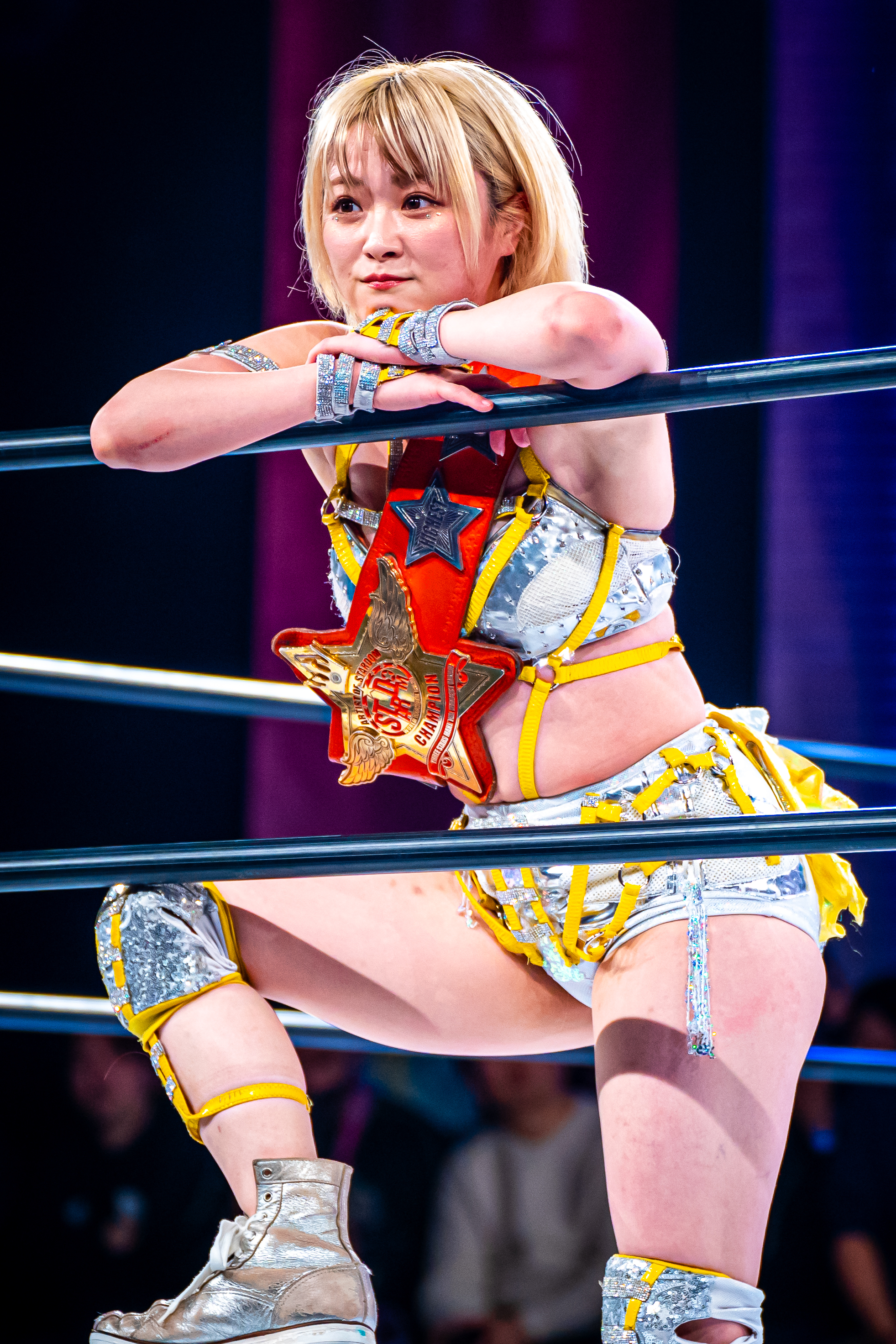
...and here with the "orange" belt.

- Pro Wrestling Illustrated
  - Ranked No. 40 of the top 250 female wrestlers in the PWI Women's 250 in 2024
- Tokyo Joshi Pro Wrestling
  - International Princess Championship (1 time, inaugural)
- World Wonder Ring Stardom
  - Wonder of Stardom Championship (1 time)
  - Artist of Stardom Championship (3 times) – with Himeka and Maika (1), Kairi and Saori Anou (1), and Tam Nakano and Saori Anou (1)
  - Goddesses of Stardom Championship (2 times) – with Tam Nakano (1) and Saori Anou (1)
  - High Speed Championship (1 time)
  - ¥10,000,000 Unit Tournament (2021) – with Himeka and Maika
  - 5★Star GP Award (1 time)
    - 5★Star GP Outstanding Performance (2023)
  - Stardom Year-End Award (4 times)
    - Best Tag Team Award (2022) – with Tam Nakano, (2023) with Saori Anou
    - Best Unit Award (2020) as part of Donna del Mondo, shared with Himeka, Maika, Giulia and Syuri, (2024) as part of Cosmic Angels
