= Stardom 10th Anniversary Grand Final Osaka Dream Cinderella =

2021 World Wonder Ring Stardom event

- Promotional poster featuring Mayu Iwatani, Starlight Kid, Utami Hayashishita, Tam Nakano and Natsupoi
- Promotion: World Wonder Ring Stardom
- Date: October 9, 2021
- City: Osaka, Japan
- Venue: Osaka-jō Hall
- Attendance: 1,441

Event chronology
← Previous; 5 Star Grand Prix 2021	Next → Super Wars

Stardom 10th Anniversary Grand Final Osaka Dream Cinderella (スターダム10周年グランドファイナル大阪ドリームシンデレラ, Sutādamu 10-shūnen gurandofainaru Ōsaka dorīmushinderera) was a professional wrestling event promoted by World Wonder Ring Stardom. It took place on October 9, 2021, in Osaka at the Osaka-jō Hall with a limited attendance due in part to the ongoing COVID-19 pandemic at the time. The pay-per-view marked the last event under the "10th Anniversary" tagline.

== Storylines ==
The show featured eight professional wrestling matches that resulted from scripted storylines, where wrestlers portrayed villains, heroes, or less distinguishable characters in the scripted events that built tension and culminated in a wrestling match or series of matches. The pay-per-view will portrait the official return to professional wrestling of Hazuki who retired back in 2019. It will also host the first joshi puroresu event in the Osaka-jō Hall since 1995.

=== Background ===
On September 28, Stardom held the event's press conference which they broadcast live on their YouTube channel. Waka Tsukiyama requested Tam Nakano and the other Cosmic Angels members to join their unit which they accepted. It was also confirmed that Chigusa Nagayo will join the commentary team. Originally Syuri was scheduled to defend the SWA World Championship and World of Stardom Championship challenge rights certificate against Konami in a UWF Rules match, Konami was diagnosed with acute enteritis on October 8 and the match was cancelled. Syuri joined the commentary team instead.

=== Event ===
Moments after winning the Future of Stardom Championship from Unagi Sayaka with help from Rina who intervened in the match, Ruaka received a title challenge from Lady C. Syuri nominated AZM as the next challenger for the SWA World Championship, Unagi Sayaka challenged Tam Nakano for the Wonder of Stardom Championship and Hazuki announced she will form a tag team with Stars member Koguma in the 2021 Goddesses of Stardom Tag League.

After Hayashishita successfully defended her World of Stardom Championship against Takumi Iroha in the main event, Hazuki and Maika came to the ring to challenge her for a title match. Syuri also stepped up to remind the latter two that she is the rightful challenger for the red belt.

== Results ==
No.	Results	Stipulations	Times
1	Oedo Tai (Saki Kashima and Rina) defeated Lady C and Waka Tsukiyama	Tag team match	5:43
2	Ruaka defeated Unagi Sayaka (c)	Singles match for the Future of Stardom Championship	8:17
3	Marvelous (Rin Kadokura and Maria) defeated Cosmic Angels (Mina Shirakawa and Mai Sakurai)	Tag team match	11:39
4	Starlight Kid (c) defeated Fukigen Death	Singles match for the High Speed Championship	5:47
5	MaiHimePoi (Maika, Himeka and Natsupoi) (c) defeated Queen's Quest (Momo Watanabe, AZM and Saya Kamitani)	Six-woman tag team match for the Artist of Stardom Championship	16:36
6	Hazuki defeated Koguma	Singles match	11:39
7	Syuri (c) defeated Saki Kashima	Singles match for the SWA World Championship and World of Stardom Championship challenge rights certificate	8:58
8	Tam Nakano (c) vs. Mayu Iwatani ended in a time-limit draw	Singles match for the Wonder of Stardom Championship	30:00
9	Utami Hayashishita (c) defeated Takumi Iroha (Note: This match had no time limit.)	Singles match for the World of Stardom Championship	30:52
(c) / – the champion(s) heading into the match
