= List of Smackgirl events =

This is a list of the events held by Japanese mixed martial arts (MMA) promotion Smackgirl.

== Events ==
=== Remix ===
| Event | Date | Venue | Location | Attendance |
|---|---|---|---|---|
| ReMix Golden Gate 2001 (Note: Event held under the ReMix brand.) | May 3, 2001 | Yoyogi National Gymnasium, 2nd Gymnasium | Shibuya, Tokyo, Japan | 2,095 |
| ReMix World Cup 2000 | December 5, 2000 | Nippon Budokan | Chiyoda, Tokyo, Japan | 6,500 |

=== Smackgirl ===
| Event | Date | Venue | Location | Attendance |
|---|---|---|---|---|
| Smackgirl World ReMix 2008 Second Round (SMACKGIRL WORLD ReMix TOURNAMENT 2008 準決勝, smackgirl world remix tournament 2008 junkesshō) | April 25, 2008 | Korakuen Hall | Bunkyo, Tokyo, Japan | |
| Smackgirl World ReMix 2008 Opening Round (SMACKGIRL WORLD ReMix TOURNAMENT 2008 開幕戦, smackgirl world remix tournament 2008 kaimakusen) | February 14, 2008 | Korakuen Hall | Bunkyo, Tokyo, Japan | 1,205 |
| Smackgirl 7th Anniversary: Starting Over (Note: The event was the first under a new management.) | December 26, 2007 | Korakuen Hall | Bunkyo, Tokyo, Japan | 1,546 |
| Smackgirl 2007: Queens' Hottest Summer (SMACKGIRL 2007 〜女王たちの一番熱い夏〜, smackgirl 2007 joō tachi no ichiban atsui natsu ~) | September 6, 2007 | Korakuen Hall | Bunkyo, Tokyo, Japan | 1,596 |
| Smackgirl in Summerfest!! (SMACKGIRL IN サマフェス!!, smackgirl in samafesu!!) (Note: The event was held during Summerfest!!, an open air cultural event .) | July 26, 2007 | Yoyogi Park | Shibuya, Tokyo, Japan | |
| Smackgirl 2007: The Queen Said The USA Is Strongest (SMACKGIRL 2007 ～最強はUSAだと女王は言った～, smackgirl 2007 saikyō wa usa dato joō wa iu) (Note: The event was held after Smackgirl-F 2007: The Next Cinderella Tournament 2007 2nd Stage. Both were held at the same venue.) | May 19, 2007 | Shinjuku Face | Kabukicho, Tokyo, Japan | 650 |
| Smackgirl 2007: The Dance of the Taisho Romance (SMACKGIRL 2007 ～絶対女王は大正浪漫を舞ひ奏で～, smackgirl 2007 zettai joō wa taishō roman o maihi kanaderu) | April 28, 2007 | Azalea Taisho Hall | Taisho-ku, Osaka, Japan | 610 |
| Smackgirl 2007: Will The Queen Paint The Shinjuku Skies Red? (SMACKGIRL 2007 ～女王は新宿の夜を赤く染るか？～, smackgirl 2007 joō wa shinjuku no yoru o akaku somaru ka?) (Note: The event was held after Smackgirl-F 2007: The Next Cinderella Tournament 2007 First Stage. Both were held at the same venue.) | March 11, 2007 | Shinjuku Face | Kabukicho, Tokyo, Japan | 968 |
| Smackgirl 2006: Legend of Extreme Women (SMACKGIRL 2006 〜極女伝説〜, smackgirl 2006 kyoku jo densetsu) | November 29, 2006 | Korakuen Hall | Bunkyo, Tokyo, Japan | 1,396 |
| Smackgirl 2006: Women Hold Their Ground (SMACKGIRL 2006 〜群女割拠〜, smackgirl 2006 gun onna kakkyo) | September 15, 2006 | Korakuen Hall | Bunkyo, Tokyo, Japan | 1,375 |
| Smackgirl 2006: Top Girl Battle (SMACKGIRL 2006 〜頂女決戦〜, smackgirl 2006 itadaki onna kessen) | June 30, 2006 | Korakuen Hall | Bunkyo, Tokyo, Japan | 1,480 |
| Smackgirl 2006: Queen's Triumphant Return (SMACKGIRL 2006 〜女王凱旋〜, smackgirl 2006 joō gaisen) | April 22, 2006 | Azalea Taisho Hall | Taisho-ku, Osaka, Japan | 600 |
| Smackgirl 2006: Advent of Goddess (SMACKGIRL 2006 〜女神降臨〜, smackgirl 2006 megami kōrin) | February 15, 2006 | Korakuen Hall | Bunkyo, Tokyo, Japan | 1,313 |
| Smackgirl 2005: Lightweight Anniversary (SMACKGIRL 2005 〜最軽量記念日〜, smackgirl 2005 sai keiryō kinenbi) | November 29, 2005 | Korakuen Hall | Bunkyo, Tokyo, Japan | 1,550 |
| Smackgirl 2005: Dynamic!! | August 17, 2005 | Yoyogi National Gymnasium, 2nd Gymnasium | Shibuya, Tokyo, Japan | 2,315 |
| Smackgirl 2005: Road to Dynamic!! | June 28, 2005 | Korakuen Hall | Bunkyo, Tokyo, Japan | 1,540 |
| Smackgirl: Korea 2005 | May 21, 2005 | Dream Tower | Suwon, Gyeonggi-do, South Korea | |
| Smackgirl 2005: Cool Fighter Last Stand | April 30, 2005 | Kira Messe Numazu | Numazu, Shizuoka Prefecture, Japan | 714 |
| Smackgirl: Niigata Revival Festival 2005 | April 10, 2005 | Niigata Phase | Niigata, Niigata Prefecture, Japan | |
| Smackgirl 2004: World ReMix | December 19, 2004 | Twin Messe Shizuoka | Shizuoka, Shizuoka Prefecture, Japan | 1,717 |
| Smackgirl 2004: Yuuki Kondo Retirement Celebration (SMACKGIRL 2004 〜近藤有希引退記念興行〜, smackgirl 2004 kondō yūki intai kinen kōgyō) | November 4, 2004 | Korakuen Hall | Bunkyo, Tokyo, Japan | 998 |
| Smackgirl 2004: Holy Land Triumphal Return (SMACKGIRL 2004 〜聖地凱旋〜, smackgirl 2004 seichi gaisen) | August 5, 2004 | Korakuen Hall | Bunkyo, Tokyo, Japan | 1,414 |
| Smackgirl 2004: Go West | June 19, 2004 | Azalea Taisho Hall | Taisho-ku, Osaka, Japan | 551 |
| Smackgirl: Third Season VII | November 10, 2003 | Velfarre | Minato, Tokyo, Japan | 695 |
| Smackgirl: Third Season VI | August 6, 2003 | Velfarre | Minato, Tokyo, Japan | 715 |
| Smackgirl: Third Season V | July 6, 2003 | Velfarre | Minato, Tokyo, Japan | 707 |
| Smackgirl: Third Season IV | June 4, 2003 | Velfarre | Minato, Tokyo, Japan | 797 |
| Smackgirl: Third Season III | May 7, 2003 | Velfarre | Minato, Tokyo, Japan | 766 |
| Smackgirl: Third Season II | April 2, 2003 | Velfarre | Minato, Tokyo, Japan | 799 |
| Smackgirl: Third Season I | March 3, 2003 | Velfarre | Minato, Tokyo, Japan | 723 |
| Smackgirl: Japan Cup 2002 Grand Final | December 29, 2002 | Tokyo FM Hall | Chiyoda, Tokyo, Japan | 480 |
| Smackgirl: Japan Cup 2002 Episode 2 (SMACK GIRL ～JAPAN CUP 2002 エピソード2～) | November 9, 2002 | Differ Ariake Arena | Koto, Tokyo, Japan | |
| Smackgirl: Japan Cup 2002 Opening Round (SMACK GIRL ～JAPAN CUP 開幕戦～, smack girl japan cup kaimakusen) | October 5, 2002 | Differ Ariake Arena | Koto, Tokyo, Japan | 501 |
| Smackgirl: Dynamic! Last Summer Forever in Ariake (SMACK GIRL ～Dynamic! LAST SUMMER FOREVER in 有明～) | September 1, 2002 | Differ Ariake Arena | Koto, Tokyo, Japan | 489 |
| Smackgirl: Summer Gate 2002 | August 4, 2002 | Differ Ariake Arena | Koto, Tokyo, Japan | 532 |
| Smackgirl: Strongest Tag Tournament 2002 (SMACK GIRL ～最強タッグトーナメント～, saikyō taggu tōnamento) | July 6, 2002 | Differ Ariake Arena | Koto, Tokyo, Japan | |
| Smackgirl: Smack Legend 2002 | June 1, 2002 | Differ Ariake Arena | Koto, Tokyo, Japan | 498 |
| Smackgirl: Golden Gate 2002 | May 6, 2002 | Differ Ariake Arena | Koto, Tokyo, Japan | 552 |
| Smackgirl: Royal Smack 2002 | April 7, 2002 | Differ Ariake Arena | Koto, Tokyo, Japan | 580 |
| Smackgirl: God Bless You | March 2, 2002 | Differ Ariake Arena | Koto, Tokyo, Japan | 505 |
| Smackgirl: Pioneering Spirit | February 3, 2002 | Differ Ariake Arena | Koto, Tokyo, Japan | |
| Smackgirl: Alive! | September 27, 2001 | Club Atom | Shibuya, Tokyo, Japan | |
| Smackgirl: Burning Night | August 23, 2001 | Club Atom | Shibuya, Tokyo, Japan | |
| Smackgirl: Indeed, | July 26, 2001 | Club Atom | Shibuya, Tokyo, Japan | |
| Smackgirl: Fighting Chance | June 28, 2001 | Club Atom | Shibuya, Tokyo, Japan | |
| Smackgirl: Starting Over | May 24, 2001 | Club Atom | Shibuya, Tokyo, Japan | 235 |
| Smackgirl: Episode 0 | December 17, 2000 | Korakuen Hall | Bunkyo, Tokyo, Japan | |

=== Smackgirl-F ===
| Event | Date | Venue | Location | Attendance |
|---|---|---|---|---|
| Smackgirl-F 2007: The Next Cinderella Tournament 2007 2nd Stage (Note: The event was held before Smackgirl 2007: The Queen Said The USA Is Strongest. Both were held at the same venue.) | May 19, 2007 | Shinjuku Face | Kabukicho, Tokyo, Japan | 248 |
| Smackgirl-F 2007: The Next Cinderella Tournament 2007 First Stage (SMACKGIRL-F 2007 ～The Next Cinderella Tournament 2007 開幕戦～, smackgirl-f 2007 the next cinderella tournament 2007 kaimakusen) (Note: The event was held before Smackgirl 2007: Will The Queen Paint The Shinjuku Skies Red?. Both were held at the same venue.) | March 11, 2007 | Shinjuku Face | Kabukicho, Tokyo, Japan | |
| Smackgirl-F 2006: Women's Fighting Road vol. 1 (SMACKGIRL-F 2006 〜西調布女子格ロードvol.1〜, smackgirl-f 2006 nishi chōfu joshi kaku rōdo vol.1 ~) | October 21, 2006 | West Chofu Arena | Chofu, Tokyo, Japan | 200 |
| Smackgirl-F 2006: The Next Cinderella 2006 | May 3, 2006 | Tokyo Kinema Club | Taito, Tokyo, Japan | 250 |
| FF2 Gi-Feminino 2006 × Smackgirl-F 2006 (Note: The event combined grappling bouts of Gi-Feminino 2006 and professional MMA bouts of Smackgirl-F 2006 and amateur MMA bouts of SG-F14 (Smackgirl-F 14.)) | February 3, 2006 | Kitazawa Town Hall | Setagaya, Tokyo, Japan | 250 |
| Smackgirl-F 2005: Shimokita Experiment League Round 1 (SMACKGIRL-F 2005 ～下北実験リーグ Round1～, smackgirl-f 2005 shimokita jikken rīgu round1) (Note: The event combined professional MMA bouts of Smackgirl-F 2005: Shimokita Experiment League Round 1 and amateur MMA bouts of SG-F14 (Smackgirl-F 14.)) | October 15, 2005 | Kitazawa Town Hall | Setagaya, Tokyo, Japan | 224 |
| Smackgirl-F 2005: The Next Cinderella Tournament 2005 2nd Stage (Note: The event combined professional MMA bouts of The Next Cinderella Tournament 2005 2nd Stage and amateur MMA bouts of SG-F13 (Smackgirl-F 13.)) | July 10, 2005 | Gold's Gym South Tokyo Annex | Adachi, Tokyo, Japan | 355 |
| Smackgirl-F 2005: I'll do it this year! Smack-F Festival (SMACKGIRL-F 2005 〜今年もやるぞ! スマックF祭り〜, konnen moyaruzo! sumakku F matsuri) (Note: The event combined grappling bouts of Grappler's Holiday 2005 and MMA bouts of The Next Cinderella Tournament 2005.) | April 29, 2005 | Kitazawa Town Hall | Setagaya, Tokyo, Japan | 181 (grappling), 294 (MMA) |
| Smackgirl-F 12 (Note: Amateur event.) | March 21, 2005 | SOD Women's MMA Gym | Toshima, Tokyo, Japan | |
| Smackgirl-F: Refresh 2005 (Note: The event included grappling bouts of Gi-Feminino 2005.) | January 8, 2005 | Kitazawa Town Hall | Setagaya, Tokyo, Japan | 231 |
| Smackgirl-F 11 | November 28, 2004 | Gold's Gym South Tokyo Annex | Adachi, Tokyo, Japan | |
| Smackgirl-F 10 | October 17, 2004 | SOD Women's MMA Gym | Toshima, Tokyo, Japan | |
| Smackgirl-F: The sickness of May must fly away! Summer is coming, Smack-F festival (SMACKGIRL-F ～5月病をブッ飛ばせ！ 夏も近いぞスマックＦ祭～, smackgirl-f ~5 gatsu byō o butsu tobu! natsu mo chikai zo sumakku f matsuri ~) (Note: The event combined grappling bouts of Grappler's Holiday 2004, professional MMA bouts of The Next Cinderella Tournament 2nd stage-B and amateur MMA bouts of SG-F8 (Smackgirl-F 8.)) | May 16, 2004 | Gold's Gym South Tokyo Annex | Adachi, Tokyo, Japan | 390 |
| Smackgirl-F: Next Cinderella Tournament 2nd stage & SG-F7 (Note: The event combined professional MMA bouts of the Next Cinderella Tournament with amateur MMA bouts of SG-F7 (Smackgirl-F 7.)) | March 20, 2004 | Gold's Gym South Tokyo Annex | Adachi, Tokyo, Japan | 303 |
| Smackgirl-F: Next Cinderella Tournament & SG-F6 (Note: The event combined professional MMA bouts of the Next Cinderella Tournament with amateur MMA bouts of SG-F6 (Smackgirl-F 6.)) | February 1, 2004 | Gold's Gym South Tokyo Annex | Adachi, Tokyo, Japan | 385 |
| Smackgirl-F 5 (Note: Amateur event. Included a professional bout.) | December 6, 2003 | Shinagawa CS | Shinagawa, Tokyo, Japan | |
| Smackgirl-F 4 | October 12, 2003 | Shinagawa CS | Shinagawa, Tokyo, Japan | |
| Smackgirl-F 3 | July 20, 2003 | Shinagawa CS | Shinagawa, Tokyo, Japan | |
| Smackgirl-F 2 | May 11, 2003 | Shinagawa Ward Gymnasium Judo Hall | Shinagawa, Tokyo, Japan | |
| Smackgirl-F 1 (第1回 SmackGirl-F, dai 1 kai smackgirl-f) | March 1, 2003 | Tokyo Budokan, Second Martial Arts Hall | Adachi, Tokyo, Japan | |

=== Grappling events ===
| Event | Date | Venue | Location | Attendance |
|---|---|---|---|---|
| Smackgirl Grappling Queen Tournament 2007 | September 24, 2007 | Kitazawa Town Hall | Setagaya, Tokyo, Japan | |
| Smackgirl Grappling Queen Tournament 2006 | July 23, 2006 | Gold's Gym South Tokyo Annex | Adachi, Tokyo, Japan | |
| Smack Jiu-Jitsu Gig 06 | February 5, 2006 | Taito Riverside Sports Center | Taito, Tokyo, Japan | |
| Smack Jiu-Jitsu Gig 05 | June 12, 2005 | Bunkyo Sports Center | Bunkyo, Tokyo, Japan | |
| Smack Jiu-Jitsu Gig 04 in Nagoya | May 15, 2005 | Alive MMA Academy | Nagoya, Aichi Prefecture, Japan | |
| Smack Jiu-Jitsu Gig 02 & Smackgirl-F 9 (Note: The event combined grappling bouts of Smack Jiu-Jitsu Gig 02 and amateur MMA bouts of Smackgirl-F 9.) | August 8, 2004 | Chiyoda Gymnasium | Chiyoda, Tokyo, Japan | |
| Smack Jiu-Jitsu Gig 01 | July 11, 2004 | Chiyoda Gymnasium | Chiyoda, Tokyo, Japan | |
| Smackgirl Third Season EX: Grappler's Holiday | July 6, 2003 | Velfarre | Minato, Tokyo, Japan | 707 |
