= KG =

KG, Kg, kG or kg may refer to:

== Units of measurement ==
- kg, the kilogram, the SI base unit of mass
  - ㎏, the kilogram symbol as a single character in the CJK Compatibility block
- kG or kGs, the kilogauss, a unit of measurement of magnetic induction

== Arts and media ==
- K.G. (album), a 2020 album by King Gizzard & the Lizard Wizard
- KG, an unrealized Indian film starring Kamal Haasan
- Kadenang Ginto, 2018–2020 Filipino drama series

== Businesses and organizations ==
=== Types of organization ===
- Kampfgruppe, a military combat formation
- Kommanditgesellschaft, a German limited partnership business entity

=== Particular organizations ===
- Kammergericht, the highest state court in Berlin, Germany
- Kathmandu Gorkhas, a cricket franchise in the Nepal Premier League (NPL)
- Kompas Gramedia, a company in Indonesia
- LAI – Línea Aérea IAACA, a Venezuelan airline (IATA airline designator KG)

== Language ==
- kg, a digraph used in orthographies of several languages; see List of Latin-script digraphs#K
- Kongo language, ISO 639-1 language code kg

== People ==
- KG (wrestler), ring name of Syuri (born 1989)
- K. G. Cunningham (born 1939), Australian radio presenter and cricketer
- Kevin Garnett (born 1976), nicknamed KG, American basketball player
- Kyle Gass (born 1960), nicknamed KG, American musician of Tenacious D
- Kagiso Rabada (born 1995), nicknamed KG, South African cricketer
- KG (singer) (born 2007), former member of global girl group Vcha

== Places ==
- Bad Kissingen, Germany, vehicle registration code KG
- Kragujevac, Serbia, vehicle registration code KG
- Kyrgyzstan, ISO 3166 country code KG
  - .kg, Internet country code top-level domain for Kyrgyzstan

== Other uses ==
- Karagarga, a BitTorrent tracker specialized in rare movies
- Kindergarten, pre-school education
- Klein–Gordon equation, a relativistic wave equation
- Knight of the Garter, a member of a British order of chivalry
- Ship's center of gravity above keel

== See also ==
- Kay Gee (disambiguation)
- Kampong or kampung, Malay and Indonesian word for 'village', found in place names
- King, the title given to a male monarch
