= Stardom Cinderella Summer In Tokyo =

2020 World Wonder Ring Stardom event

- Promotional poster featuring Sumire Natsu, Natsuko Tora and Saki Kashima
- Promotion: World Wonder Ring Stardom
- Date: July 26, 2020 (aired August 4, 2020)
- City: Tokyo, Japan
- Venue: Korakuen Hall
- Attendance: 483

Event chronology
← Previous; Cinderella Tournament 2020	Next → Yokohama Cinderella 2020

Stardom Cinderella Summer In Tokyo (スターダム シンデレラ東京の夏, Sutādamu Shinderera Tōkyō no natsu) was a professional wrestling event promoted by World Wonder Ring Stardom. It took place on July 26, 2020 in Tokyo, Japan, at the Korakuen Hall with a limited attendance due in part to the ongoing COVID-19 pandemic at the time. The show aired on August 4, 2020 on tape delay.

Seven matches were contested at the event, and three of Stardom's seven championships were on the line. The main event saw Giulia defeat Tam Nakano to win the vacant Wonder of Stardom Championship. In other prominent matches, AphrOditE (Saya Kamitani and Utami Hayashishita) defeated Tokyo Cyber Squad (Jungle Kyona and Konami) to win the vacant Goddesses of Stardom Championship, and AZM defeated Riho and Starlight Kid in a three-way match to win the High Speed Championship.

== Production ==
=== Background ===
The show featured seven professional wrestling matches that resulted from scripted storylines, where wrestlers portrayed villains, heroes, or less distinguishable characters in the scripted events that built tension and culminated in a wrestling match or series of matches.

=== Event ===
Before the first match taking place, Stardom announced that roster member Itsuki Hoshino would retire due to bad health condition. Hanan and Ruaka's returns were also announced after the two spent much time recovering. The first match saw Saki Kashima picking up a victory over Hina. The second match saw Natsuko Tora and Sumire Natsu getting a victory over Death Yama-san and Rina. Next, the Queen's Quest leader Momo Watanabe won her singles bout against the Future of Stardom Champion Maika. The fourth match saw Himeka and Syuri defeating the World of Stardom Champion Mayu Iwatani and Saya Iida. Syuri landed a challenge for the world title to Iwatani which the latter accepted. Next, the Queen's Quest's sub-team of Aphrodite, composed by Utami Hayashishita and Saya Kamitani succeeded in winning the vacant Goddesses of Stardom Championship after defeating Tokyo Cyber Squad's Jungle Kyona and Konami.

In the main event, Giulia cashed in her 2020 Cinderella Tournament wish, which was to compete for the Wonder of Stardom Championship. But since the title was vacated by Arisa Hoshiki earlier on May 20 due to her retirement, a new opponent for Giulia was chosen, and that would be Tam Nakano. At the end of the night, the Donna Del Mondo leader succeeded in winning the title.

== Results ==
No.	Results	Stipulations	Times
1	Saki Kashima defeated Hina by pinfall	Singles match	4:15
2	Oedo Tai (Natsuko Tora and Sumire Natsu) defeated Tokyo Cyber Squad (Death Yama-san and Rina) by pinfall	Tag team match	7:12
3	Momo Watanabe defeated Maika by pinfall	Singles match	10:39
4	Donna Del Mondo (Himeka and Syuri) defeated Stars (Mayu Iwatani and Saya Iida) by pinfall	Tag team match	13:21
5	AZM defeated Riho (c) and Starlight Kid by pinfall	Three-way match for the High Speed Championship	7:10
6	AphrOditE (Saya Kamitani and Utami Hayashishita) defeated Tokyo Cyber Squad (Jungle Kyona and Konami) by pinfall	Tag team match for the vacant Goddesses of Stardom Championship	14:28
7	Giulia defeated Tam Nakano by technical submission	Singles match for the vacant Wonder of Stardom Championship	28:27
(c) / – the champion(s) heading into the match
