= Stardom 9th Anniversary Show =

2020 World Wonder Ring Stardom event

- Promotional poster featuring various wrestlers
- Promotion: World Wonder Ring Stardom
- Date: January 19, 2020 (aired January 25, 2020)
- City: Tokyo, Japan
- Venue: Korakuen Hall
- Attendance: 1,602

Event chronology
← Previous; Year-End Climax 2019	Next → The Way To Major League

Stardom Anniversary chronology
← Previous; 8th Anniversary	Next → 10th Anniversary

Stardom 9th Anniversary Show (スターダム9周年記念ショー, Sutādamu 9 shūnenkinen shō) was a professional wrestling event promoted by World Wonder Ring Stardom. It took place on January 19, 2020, in Tokyo, Japan, at the Korakuen Hall. The show aired on January 25, 2020, on tape delay. It was the first pay-per-view organized by the company in 2020.

Eight matches were contested at the event, and three of Stardom's seven championships were on the line. The main event saw Mayu Iwatani defeat Momo Watanabe to retain the World of Stardom Championship. In other prominent matches, Arisa Hoshiki successfully retained the Wonder of Stardom Championship against Utami Hayashishita, and Oedo Tai (Bea Priestley and Jamie Hayter) defeated Tokyo Cyber Squad (Jungle Kyona and Konami) to win the Goddesses of Stardom Championship.

== Production ==
=== Background ===
The show featured eight professional wrestling matches that resulted from scripted storylines, where wrestlers portrayed villains, heroes, or less distinguishable characters in the scripted events that built tension and culminated in a wrestling match or series of matches.

=== Event ===
The show started with the tag team confrontation between Hina and Leo Onozaki and Rina and Ruaka, solded with the victory of the latter team.

Next up, AZM defeated Starlight Kid and Zoey Skye in three-way action. In the third bout, Natsuko Tora, Natsu Sumire and Saki Kashima picked up a victory over Itsuki Hoshino, Saya Iida and Saya Kamitani in six-woman tag team competition. In the fourth bout, Tam Nakano defeated Kagetsu in singles competition. Next up, Bea Priestley and Jamie Hayter defeated Jungle Kyona and Konami to win the Goddesses of Stardom Championship. Priestley defected Queen's Quest and joined Oedo Tai. In the sixth bout, Giulia was scheduled to face Tokyo Cyber Squad's members Death Yama-san, Hana Kimura and Leyla Hirsch alongside JTO's Maika and one other mystery partner as a result of her brief feud with Kimura. The mystery competitor was revealed to be a returning Syuri. Giulia's team picked up the win and following the match, she revealed the name of the new unit as Donna Del Mondo. In the semi main event, Arisa Hoshiki defeated Future of Stardom and SWA World Champion Utami Hayashishita to secure her ninth consecutive defense of the Wonder of Stardom Championship in that respective reign. After the bout concluded, Hoshiki received a title challenge from Bea Priestley in a match which was set for The Way To Major League on February 8, 2020.

In the main event, Mayu Iwatani defeated Momo Watanabe to secure her second consecutive defense of the World of Stardom Championship in that respective reign. After the bout concluded, Iwatani received a title challenge via video from Sareee.

== Results ==
No.	Results	Stipulations	Times
1	Tokyo Cyber Squad (Rina and Ruaka) defeated Queen's Quest (Hina and Leo Onozaki)	Tag team match	3:39
2	AZM defeated Starlight Kid and Zoey Skye	Three-way match	6:03
3	Oedo Tai (Natsuko Tora, Natsu Sumire and Saki Kashima) defeated Itsuki Hoshino and 3838 Tag (Saya Iida and Saya Kamitani)	Six-woman tag team match	10:56
4	Tam Nakano defeated Kagetsu	Singles match	10:15
5	Oedo Tai (Bea Priestley and Jamie Hayter) defeated Tokyo Cyber Squad (Jungle Kyona and Konami) (c)	Tag team match for the Goddesses of Stardom Championship	12:55
6	Donna Del Mondo (Giulia, Maika and Syuri (Note: Syuri were announced as the mystery partner of Giulia and Maika.)) defeated Tokyo Cyber Squad (Death Yama-san, Hana Kimura and Leyla Hirsch)	Six-woman tag team match	14:08
7	Arisa Hoshiki (c) defeated Utami Hayashishita	Singles match for the Wonder of Stardom Championship	15:21
8	Mayu Iwatani (c) defeated Momo Watanabe	Singles match for the World of Stardom Championship	19:12
(c) / – the champion(s) heading into the match
