= Stardom 10th Anniversary Show =

2021 World Wonder Ring Stardom event

- The official poster featuring a big part of the participants
- Promotion: World Wonder Ring Stardom
- Date: January 17, 2021
- City: Tokyo, Japan
- Venue: Korakuen Hall
- Attendance: 713

Event chronology
← Previous; Osaka Dream Cinderella 2020	Next → All Star Dream Cinderella

Stardom Anniversary chronology
← Previous; 9th Anniversary	Next → —

The Stardom 10th Anniversary Show (スターダム10周年記念ショー, Sutādamu 10 shūnenkinen shō) was a professional wrestling event promoted by World Wonder Ring Stardom. It was the first from the promotion's 10th Anniversary celebration line of events, as well as the promotion's first pay-per-view of 2021. It took place on January 17, 2021 in Tokyo, Japan, at the Korakuen Hall with a limited attendance due in part to the ongoing COVID-19 pandemic at the time.

Seven matches were contested at the event, including one on the pre-show, and four of Stardom's seven championships were on the line. The main event saw Utami Hayashishita defeat Maika to retain the World of Stardom Championship. In another prominent match, Giulia defeated Natsuko Tora in a no disqualification match to retain the Wonder of Stardom Championship.

== Storylines ==
The show featured seven professional wrestling matches that resulted from scripted storylines, where wrestlers portrayed villains, heroes, or less distinguishable characters in the scripted events that built tension and culminated in a wrestling match or series of matches. The event's press conference was held online on January 13, 2021 and broadcast live on Stardom's YouTube channel.

=== Event ===
The pay-per-view kicked off with Saya Iida successfully retaining the Future of Stardom Championship over Cosmic Angels member and one third of the Artist of Stardom Champions, Unagi Sayaka. The second match saw Natsupoi defeating Konami by disqualification after the latter attacked her with an illegal chair. After her win, Natsupoi challenged AZM for the High Speed Championship. Giulia retained the Wonder of Stardom Championship over Oedo Tai's leader Natsuko Tora in a match what looked to be like a hardcore match but still being sanctioned as only a "no disqualification one". Both Giulia and Tora were allowed to use weapons such as chairs, tables and bricks.

The main event portraited the confrontation between Utami Hayashishita and Maika for the World of Stardom Championship which solded with Hayashishita retaining over Donna Del Mondo's member. Hayashishita's Queen's Quest stablemate Saya Kamitani stepped up as her new title challenger for Stardom All Star Dream Cinderella on March 3, 2021.

== Results ==
No.	Results	Stipulations	Times
1^{P}	Saya Iida (c) defeated Unagi Sayaka	Singles match for the Future of Stardom Championship	12:01
2	Natsupoi defeated Konami by disqualification	Singles match	8:03
3	AZM (c) defeated Kaori Yoneyama	Singles match for the High Speed Championship	5:36
4	Tam Nakano defeated Starlight Kid	Singles match	10:53
5	Queen's Quest (Momo Watanabe and Saya Kamitani) defeated Donna Del Mondo (Himeka and Syuri), Oedo Tai (Bea Priestley and Saki Kashima), and Stars (Mayu Iwatani and Ruaka)	Four-way elimination tag team match	15:04
6	Giulia (c) defeated Natsuko Tora	No disqualification match for the Wonder of Stardom Championship	18:34
7	Utami Hayashishita (c) defeated Maika	Singles match for the World of Stardom Championship	24:12
(c) / – the champion(s) heading into the match; P / – the match was broadcast on the pre-show
