= Stardom The Way To Major League =

2020 World Wonder Ring Stardom event

- Promotional poster featuring various wrestlers
- Promotion: World Wonder Ring Stardom
- Date: February 8, 2020 (aired February 15, 2020)
- City: Tokyo, Japan
- Venue: Korakuen Hall
- Attendance: 1,519

Event chronology
← Previous; 9th Anniversary Show	Next → Cinderella Tournament 2020

Stardom The Way To Major League (スターダム メジャーリーグへの道, Sutādamu mejārīgu e no michi) was a professional wrestling event promoted by World Wonder Ring Stardom. It took place on February 8, 2020, in Tokyo, Japan, at the Korakuen Hall. The show aired on February 15, 2020, on tape delay.

Six matches were contested at the event, and two of Stardom's seven championships were on the line. The main event saw Takumi Iroha defeat Mayu Iwatani. In other prominent matches, Arisa Hoshiki successfully retained the Wonder of Stardom Championship against Bea Priestley, and Donna Del Mondo (Giulia, Maika and Syuri) defeated Queen's Quest (AZM, Momo Watanabe and Utami Hayashishita) to win the Artist of Stardom Championship.

== Production ==
=== Background ===
The show featured six professional wrestling matches that resulted from scripted storylines, where wrestlers portrayed villains, heroes, or less distinguishable characters in the scripted events that built tension and culminated in a wrestling match or series of matches.

=== Event ===
The show started with the singles confrontation between Leo Onozaki and Itsuki Hoshino, solded with the victory of the latter. Next up, Death Yama-san and Leyla Hirsch last eliminated Saya Iida and Saya Kamitani to win a Gauntlet tag team match which also involved the teams of Hina and Rina, Jamie Hayter and Zoey Skye, and Stars (Tam Nakano and Starlight Kid). In the third bout, Natsuko Tora, Natsu Sumire and Saki Kashima picked up a victory over Hana Kimura, Jungle Kyona and Konami in a number one contendership match for the Artist of Stardom Championship. In the fourth bout, Giulia, Maika and Syuri of the newly formed unit of Donna Del Mondo defeated AZM, Momo Watanabe and Utami Hayashishita to win the Artist of Stardom Championship. In the semi main event, Arisa Hoshiki defeated Bea Priestley to secure the tenth consecutive defense of the Wonder of Stardom Championship in that respective reign, which was also the last retain of the title before later relinquishing it due to her retirement from professional wrestling.

In the main event, Takumi Iroha outmatched Mayu Iwatani in singles competition.

== Results ==
No.	Results	Stipulations	Times
1	Itsuki Hoshino defeated Leo Onozaki	Singles match	3:15
2	Tokyo Cyber Squad (Death Yama-san and Leyla Hirsch) won by last eliminating 3838 Tag (Saya Iida and Saya Kamitani) (Note: The other participating teams were Hina and Rina, Jamie Hayter and Zoey Skye, and Stars (Tam Nakano and Starlight Kid).)	Gauntlet tag team match	11:18
3	Oedo Tai (Natsuko Tora, Natsu Sumire and Saki Kashima) defeated Tokyo Cyber Squad (Hana Kimura, Jungle Kyona and Konami)	Six-woman tag team match to determine the number one contenders for the Artist of Stardom Championship	10:08
4	Donna Del Mondo (Giulia, Maika and Syuri) defeated Queen's Quest (AZM, Momo Watanabe and Utami Hayashishita) (c)	Six-woman tag team match for the Artist of Stardom Championship	17:12
5	Arisa Hoshiki (c) defeated Bea Priestley	Singles match for the Wonder of Stardom Championship	16:52
6	Takumi Iroha defeated Mayu Iwatani	Singles match	20:49
(c) / – the champion(s) heading into the match
