= Donna Del Mondo =

Professional wrestling stable

- Donna Del Mondo's official logo since January 2020

Stable
- Leader: Giulia
- Members: See below
- Debut: January 14, 2020
- Disbanded: January 4, 2024
- Years active: 2020–2024

Donna del Mondo (ドンナ・デル・モンド) was a professional wrestling stable in the World Wonder Ring Stardom promotion. Founded by Giulia, the stable finally consisted of Mai Sakurai, Maika and Thekla. It was often known by Giulia's catchphrase arrivederci ("goodbye" in Italian), which is a reference to her Italian background.

== History ==
=== Formation ===
After her first moments in Stardom and after being accused of not having any friends, Giulia would tease the formation of a stable. On January 14, 2020, Maika lost a Future of Stardom Championship match against the champion Utami Hayashishita at one of the Professional Wrestling Just Tap Out's house shows at Korakuen Hall. After the match, Giulia appeared and recruited Maika as the second member of her new unit. At Stardom's 9th Anniversary show on January 19, Syuri returned to the company, teaming with Giulia and Maika in a six-woman tag team match to defeat Tokyo Cyber Squad (Death Yama-san, Hana Kimura and Leyla Hirsch). Following the match, Giulia announced that the name of her new unit is Donna Del Mondo.

=== Giulia's leadership (2020–2024) ===
On February 8, 2020 at Stardom The Way To Major League, Giulia teamed up with Syuri and Maika to defeat Queen's Quest (AZM, Momo Watanabe and Utami Hayashishita) for the Artist of Stardom Championship. On March 24, Giulia won the 2020 Cinderella Tournament. On the June 21 show at Shin-Kiba 1st Ring, Himeka made her Stardom debut as a mystery member for Giulia, Syuri and Maika, with whom she later defeated the team of Stars (Mayu Iwatani, Tam Nakano, Starlight Kid and Saya Iida). At Cinderella Summer in Tokyo on July 26, Giulia defeated Tam Nakano to win the vacant Wonder of Stardom Championship. On October 3, at Yokohama Cinderella 2020, Natsumi Maki debuted under the name Natsupoi, following her departure from Tokyo Joshi Pro-Wrestling and defeated Death Yama-san as a mystery opponent. She was revealed to have joined the stable as the newest member. Four of the stable members participated in the 2020 Goddesses of Stardom Tag League under two different sub-groups created only for the tournament: Crazy Bloom (Giulia and Maika) and Grab The Top (Himeka and Syuri). Crazy Bloom lost to MOMOAZ in the finals of the tournament which took place on November 8. On November 14, at Korakuen New Landscape, the team of Giulia, Syuri and Maika were defeated by Oedo Tai (Bea Priestley, Natsuko Tora and Saki Kashima) for the Artist of Stardom Championship, ending their reign at 280 days. At Sendai Cinderella 2020 on November 15, Syuri defeated Bea Priestley to win the SWA World Championship. At Osaka Dream Cinderella 2020 on December 20, Maika lost the Future of Stardom Championship to Saya Iida in a three-way match also involving Saya Kamitani.

On February 14, 2021, MaiHime (Himeka and Maika) defeated Oedo Tai (Bea Priestley and Konami) to win the Goddesses of Stardom Championship. Natsupoi defeated AZM to win the High Speed Championship at All Star Dream Cinderella on March 3, where all the members of the stable were holding titles, until Giulia lost her Wonder of Stardom Championship to Tam Nakano in a hair vs hair match the same night, after which she got her hair shaved. At Yokohama Dream Cinderella 2021 on April 4, MaiHime lost the Goddesses of Stardom Championship to fellow members Giulia and Syuri after an inter-stable clash. For the 2021 5 Star Grand Prix, all the members of the unit were listed as participants in the tournament. Syuri defeated Momo Watanabe in the finals of the event from September 25, to win the trophy. On October 3, Maika, Natsupoi and Himeka teamed up as MaiHimePoi to dethrone Cosmic Angels (Tam Nakano, Mina Shirakawa and Unagi Sayaka) by taking the Artist of Stardom Championship away from them. At Stardom 10th Anniversary Grand Final Osaka Dream Cinderella on October 9, MaiHimePoi successfully defended the Artist of Stardom Championship against Queen's Quest (Momo Watanabe, AZM and Saya Kamitani). At Osaka Super Wars on December 18, MaiHimePoi won the ¥10 Million Unit Tournament also disputed for the Artist of Stardom Championship by defeating Marvelous (Takumi Iroha, Rin Kadokura and Maria) in the semi-finals and Stars (Mayu Iwatani, Hazuki and Koguma) in the finals, scoring two consecutive defenses for the titles and winning the money prize. At Dream Queendom on December 29, MaiHimePoi successfully defended the Artist of Stardom Championship against Cosmic Angels (Mina Shirakawa, Unagi Sayaka and Mai Sakurai), Giulia made her in-ring return and defeated Konami, and in the main event, Syuri defeated Utami Hayashishita to win the World of Stardom Championship.

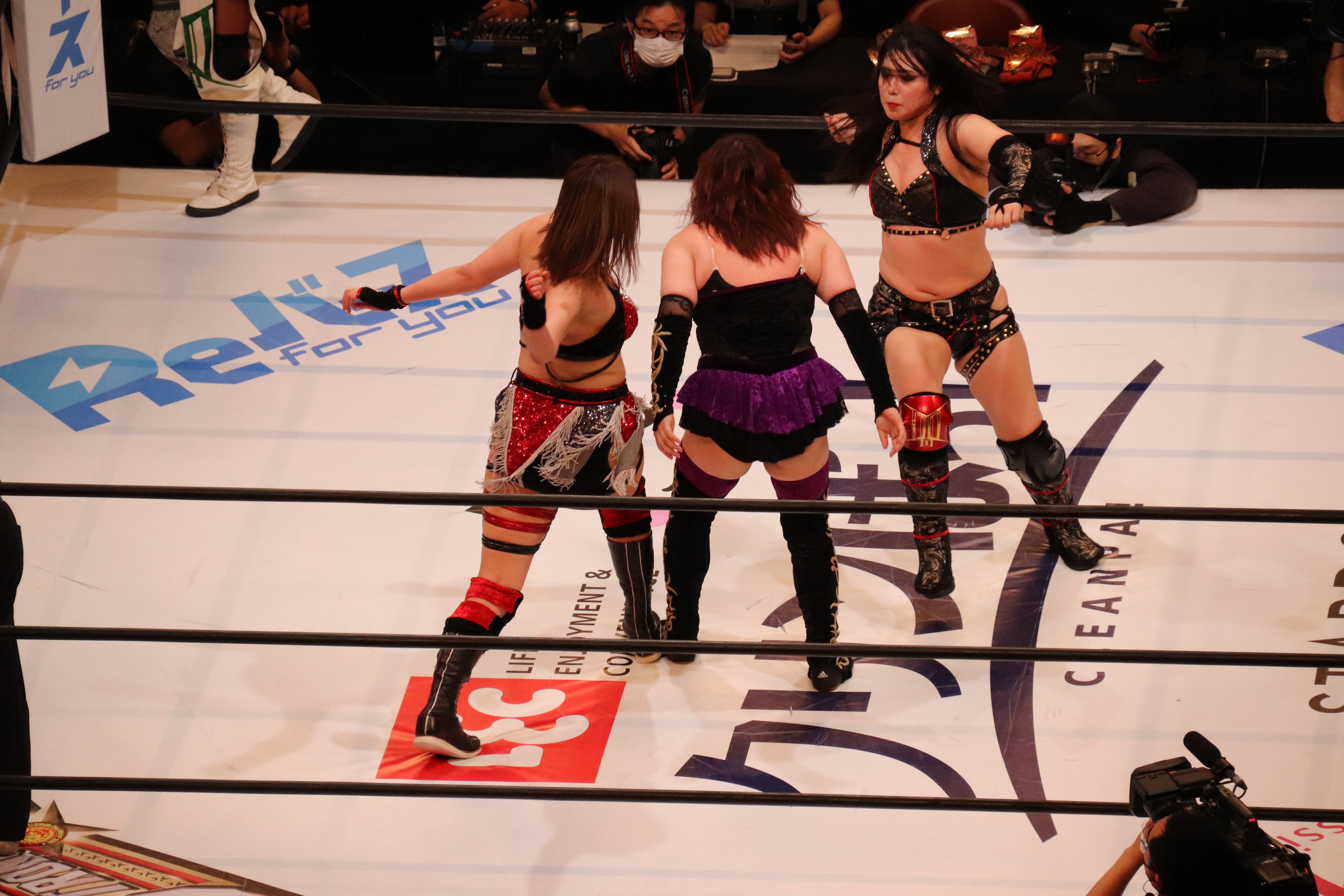
Himeka (left) and Maika (right) performing a double clothesline on Mochi Miyagi (middle) on the second night of the Stardom World Climax 2022 from March 27.

At Stardom's Award show on January 3, 2022, Giulia revealed Thekla from Ice Ribbon and Mirai from Tokyo Joshi Pro-Wrestling as the two masked superstars who kept attacking various other wrestlers. All three of them teamed up to defeat Cosmic Angels (Tam Nakano, Unagi Sayaka and Mai Sakurai) in a six-woman tag team match. On January 9, AliKaba (Giulia and Syuri) lost the Goddesses of Stardom Championship to FWC. At Nagoya Supreme Fight on January 29, Thekla defeated Mina Shirakawa to win the vacant SWA World Championship, MaiHime unsuccessfully challenged FWC for the Goddesses of Stardom Championship, and Giulia battled Mayu Iwatani into a time-limit draw in a number one contendership match for the World of Stardom Championship which resulted with an opportunity for both of them at World Climax 2022. On February 12, Giulia teamed up with Thekla and Mirai to defeat Cosmic Angels (Tam Nakano, Unagi Sayaka and Mai Sakurai) in a six-woman tag team match. After months of Giulia asking Mai Sakurai if she wants to be stronger, Sakurai told Cosmic Angels' unit leader Nakano "I don't want to dance, I want to wrestle" and joined Donna Del Mondo. On March 21, after they defeated Mayu Iwatani and Saya Iida, the feud between Syuri and Giulia degenerated into AliKaba disbanding and Syuri announcing that she wants to go on her own path, so she would hire herself a bodyguard. On the first night of the World Climax 2022, Syuri successfully defended the World of Stardom Championship against Giulia. Syuri then confirmed that she will leave Donna Del Mondo to walk on her own path and teased the formation of a new stable, with a mysterious girl helping her out of the arena. Syuri was the first member to leave Donna Del Mondo. On the second night from March 27, Giulia, Maika, Himeka and Thekla defeated Prominence (Risa Sera, Suzu Suzuki, Akane Fujita and Mochi Miyagi) with whom all the Donna Del Mondo members have been in a feud. However, Suzu Suzuki stated that she was not finished with Giulia despite Prominence's loss. In the main event of the first night of the 2022 Cinderella Tournament from April 3, Syuri defeated her new unit member Ami Sourei in the first rounds and named her new unit "God's Eye". Then Mirai showed up, announced her resignation from Donna Del Mondo, and joined God's Eye. At Flashing Champions on May 28, Giulia and Sakurai unsuccessfully challenged FWC for the Goddesses of Stardom Championship and MaiHimePoi lost the Artist of Stardom Championship to Oedo Tai (Saki Kashima, Momo Watanabe and Starlight Kid). At Fight in the Top on June 26, Giulia, Maika and Sakurai unsuccessfully challenged Oedo Tai (Starlight Kid, Momo Watanabe and Saki Kashima), and God's Eye (Syuri, Ami Sourei and Mirai) for the Artist of Stardom Championship. At Mid Summer Champions in Tokyo, which took place on July 9, Giulia, Maika, Himeka, Natsupoi and Sakurai challenged Cosmic Angels (Tam Nakano, Unagi Sayaka and Mina Shirakawa, Saki and Hikari Shimizu) in an elimination tag team match. Natsupoi betrayed Donna Del Mondo by attacking Giulia mid-match, leading to Donna Del Mondo's loss. Natsupoi subsequently joined Cosmic Angels. At Mid Summer Champions in Nagoya from July 24, Giulia, Himeka and Maika unsuccessfully challenged Oedo Tai (Momo Watanabe, Saki Kashima and Starlight Kid) for the Artist of Stardom Championship. At Gold Rush on November 19, Giulia, Thekla and Sakurai made it to the finals of the Moneyball tournament, where they lost to Stars (Mayu Iwatani, Hazuki and Koguma). At Dream Queendom 2 on December 29, Giulia defeated Syuri to win the World of Stardom Championship.

In January and February 2023, Giulia, Sakurai and Thekla competed in the Triangle Derby I under the team name Baribari Bombers. In January and March, Sakurai teamed up with Chanyota to compete in the tournament to determine the inaugural New Blood Tag Team Champions. They lost to Karma and Starlight Kid in the semi-finals. At Supreme Fight 2023 on February 4, MaiHime unsuccessfully challenged 7Upp (Nanae Takahashi and Yuu) for the Goddesses of Stardom Championship, and Giulia successfully defended the World of Stardom Championship against Suzu Suzuki. On April 23, at All Star Grand Queendom, Himeka wrestled one of her last matches in Stardom upon retirement against long time tag team partner Maika, which the latter won. At Flashing Champions 2023 on May 27, the Baribari Bombers won the Artist of Stardom Championship by defeating REStart. Also at Flashing Champions, Maika teamed up with Mei Seira and Suzu Suzuki to defeat Neo Stardom Army (Nanae Takahashi and Yuna Mizumori) and Hanako. Following this, Seira and Suzuki would continue to frequently team up with various members of Donna Del Mondo in tag team matches, especially Maika. On July 30, Maika teamed up with Mei Seira and Megan Bayne to defeat God's Eye (Saki Kashima and Syuri) and Hanako, after which Bayne would continue to frequently team up with members of Donna Del Mondo. At Nagoya Golden Fight on October 9, Maika, Megan Bayne and Suzu Suzuki teamed up to challenge the Baribari Bombers for the Artist of Stardom Championship. During the match, there were several instances of miscommunication between Maika and Suzuki, which led to the Baribari Bombers winning. In an after-match promo, Maika blamed Suzuki for the loss and promised to defeat Suzuki, which effectively meant the end of Suzuki and her tag team partner, Mei Seira, teaming with Donna Del Mondo.

At New Years Stars 2024 on January 3, 2024, Baribari Bombers participated in the 2024 Triangle Derby. After reaching the finals and deciding to defend the Artist of Stardom Championship, they lost the match and titles to Abarenbo GE. Declaring that each of the moments have evolved in the time that Donna Del Mondo were active, on January 4, 2024, Giulia officially declared for the dissolution of the stable. Maika, at this time, had become the World of Stardom Champion, and Giulia's contract had just been announced to be over soon. Thekla announced during the dissolution statement that she was taking a hiatus from Stardom to return to her native Austria. The unit reunited for one night on March 24, 2024, at KBS Hall in Kyoto, Japan, before Giulia, MIRAI, and Sakurai left Stardom.

=== Independent circuit (2020–2023) ===
At the Hana Kimura Memorial Show, Syuri and Natsupoi teamed up with Mio Momono and Asuka to defeat Kagetsu and HZK who represented Oedo Tai and Konami and Death Yama-san who represented Tokyo Cyber Squad in an Eight-woman tag team match.

=== New Japan Pro Wrestling (2021–2023) ===
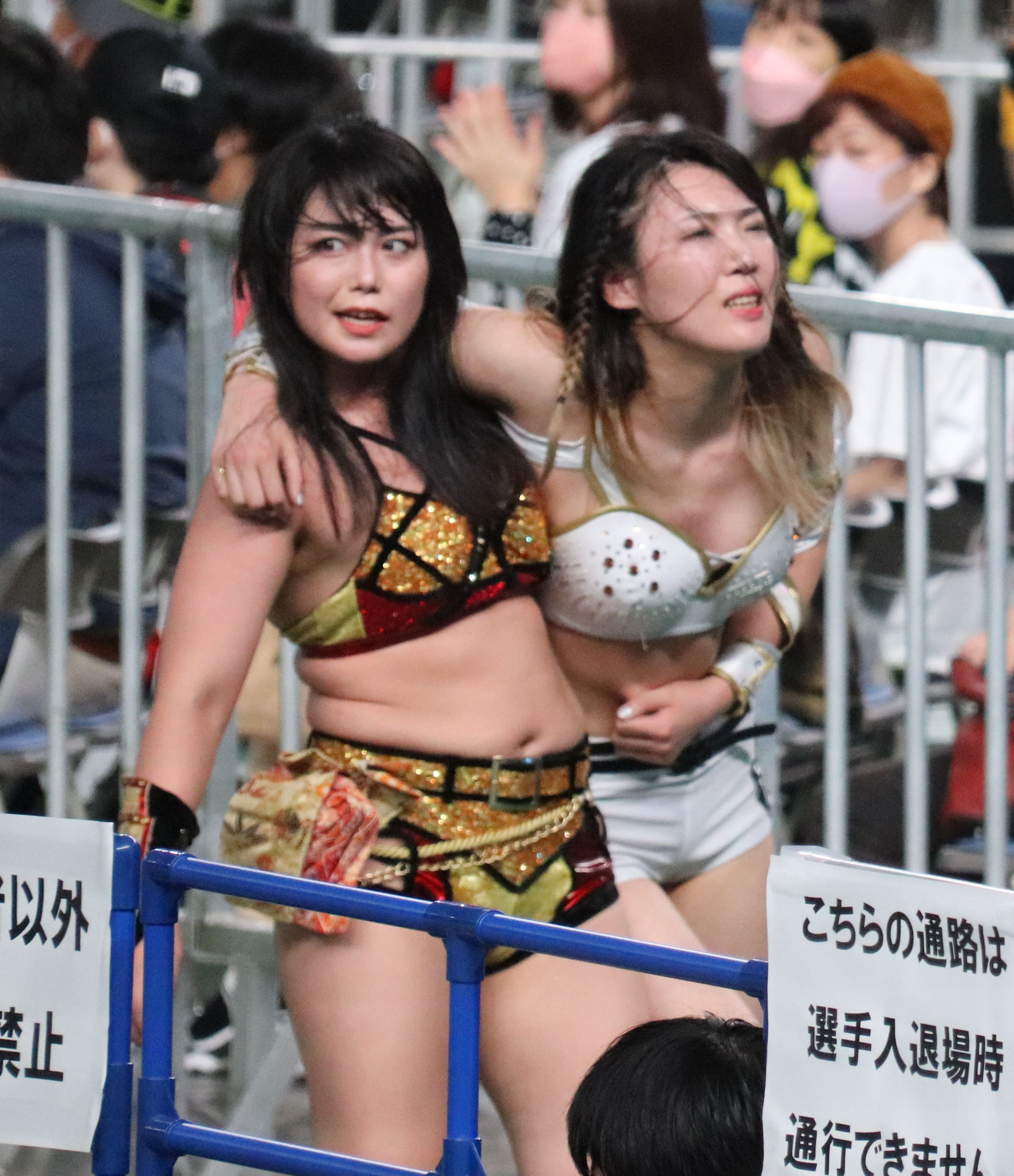
Maika (left) accompanied by Lady C at Wrestle Grand Slam in MetLife Dome

On January 5, 2021, on the second night of Wrestle Kingdom 15, Giulia and Syuri defeated Mayu Iwatani and Tam Nakano in an exhibition match. On the same night, MaiHimePoi competed in another exhibition match in a losing effort to Queen's Quest (AZM, Saya Kamitani and Utami Hayashishita). On the first night of the Wrestle Grand Slam in MetLife Dome from September 4, Maika teamed up with Lady C in a losing effort to Momo Watanabe and Saya Kamitani. On the second night, Giulia and Syuri defeated Kamitani and Watanabe. At Historic X-Over on November 20, 2022, Thekla, Mai Sakurai and Himeka lost to AZM, Lady C and Saya Kamitani, and Maika teamed up with Hirooki Goto and lost to Utami Hayashishita and Hiroshi Tanahashi in a mixed tag team match, and Giulia teamed up with Zack Sabre Jr. to defeat Syuri and Tom Lawlor in another mixed match. On July 5, 2023, during the second night of Independence Day, Giulia defeated Willow Nightingale to win the Strong Women's Championship, becoming the second champion in the title's history.

== Members ==
*	Founding member
I	Leader

Member		Joined	Left
Giulia	*I	January 14, 2020	January 4, 2024
Maika	*	January 14, 2020	January 4, 2024
Syuri	*	January 19, 2020	March 26, 2022
Himeka		June 21, 2020	May 14, 2023
Natsupoi		October 3, 2020	July 9, 2022
Mirai		December 25, 2021	April 3, 2022
Thekla		December 25, 2021	January 4, 2024
Mai Sakurai		February 12, 2022	January 4, 2024

== Sub-groups ==
Group	Members	Tenure	Type	Notes
Oh Mai Giulia	Giulia; Mai Sakurai	2022–2024	Tag Team	
Mafia Bella	Giulia; Thekla	2022–2024	Tag team	
Baribari Bombers	Giulia; Thekla; Mai Sakurai	2023–2024	Trio	
Grab The Top	Syuri; Himeka	2020	Tag team	(Note: This tag team was active only in the 2020 edition of the Goddesses of Stardom Tag League.)
Crazy Bloom	Giulia; Maika	2020	Tag team	(Note: This tag team was active only in the 2020 edition of the Goddesses of Stardom Tag League.)
MaiHime	Maika; Himeka	2020–2023	Tag team	
MaiHimePoi	Maika; Himeka; Natsupoi	2020–2022	Trio	
Ponytail and Samurai Road	Maika; Syuri	2021	Tag team	(Note: This tag team was active only in the 2021 edition of the Goddesses of Stardom Tag League.)
Himepoi'21	Himeka; Natsupoi	2021	Tag team	(Note: This tag team was active only in the 2021 edition of the Goddesses of Stardom Tag League.)
Alto Livello Kabaliwan/AliKaba	Giulia; Syuri	2021–2022	Tag team	
MaiHimePoi 2	Mai Sakurai; Himeka; Natsupoi	2022	Trio	
MaiHime with C	Maika; Himeka; Lady C	2023	Trio	

== Championships and accomplishments ==
- New Japan Pro Wrestling
  - Strong Women's Championship (1 time) – Giulia
- Pro Wrestling Illustrated
  - Singles wrestlers
    - Ranked Giulia No. 2 of the top 250 female singles wrestlers in the PWI Women's 250 in 2023
    - Ranked Maika No. 46 of the top 150 female singles wrestlers in the PWI Women's 150 in 2021
    - Ranked Natsupoi No. 55 of the top 150 female singles wrestlers in the PWI Women's 150 in 2022
    - Ranked Syuri No. 1 of the top 150 female singles wrestlers in the PWI Women's 150 in 2022
    - Ranked Thekla No. 69 of the top 150 female wrestlers in the PWI Women's 150 in 2022
    - Ranked Sakurai No. 225 of the top 250 female singles wrestlers in the PWI Women's 250 in 2023
  - Tag team wrestlers
    - Ranked Giulia and Syuri No. 5 of the top 50 tag teams in the PWI Tag Team's 50 in 2021
- Tokyo Sports
  - Women's Wrestling Grand Prize
    - (2020) – Giulia
    - (2022) – Syuri
- Weekly Pro-Wrestling
  - Women's Professional Wrestling Grand Prix (2020) – Giulia
- World Wonder Ring Stardom
  - Artist of Stardom Championship (3 times) – Giulia, Maika and Syuri (1), Himeka, Maika, Natsupoi (1), and Giulia, Thekla and Mai Sakurai (1)
  - Future of Stardom Championship (1 time) – Maika
  - Goddesses of Stardom Championship (2 times) – Himeka and Maika (1) and Giulia and Syuri (1)
  - High Speed Championship (1 time) – Natsupoi
  - SWA World Championship (2 times) – Syuri (1) and Thekla (1)
  - Wonder of Stardom Championship (1 time) – Giulia
  - World of Stardom Championship (3 times) – Syuri (1) Giulia (1), and Maika (1)
  - 5★Star GP
    - (2021) – Syuri
    - (2022) – Giulia
  - 5★Star GP Awards
    - Blue Stars Best Match Award
      - (2020) – Syuri vs. Utami Hayashishita
      - (2021) – Syuri vs. Takumi Iroha
    - Fighting Spirit Award (2020) – Maika
    - Red Stars Best Match Award
      - (2020) – Giulia vs. Tam Nakano
      - (2021) – Giulia vs. Mayu Iwatani
      - (2022) – Himeka vs. Maika
  - Cinderella Tournament
    - (2020) – Giulia
  - Goddesses of Stardom Tag League
    - (2023) – Maika with Megan Bayne (Note: Bayne was not part of the stable while winning the Tag League alongside Maika.)
  - Year-End Awards
    - Best Match Award
      - (2021) – Giulia vs. Tam Nakano
      - (2022) – Giulia vs. Syuri
      - (2023) – Giulia vs. Megan Bayne
    - Best Unit Award (2020)
    - MVP Award
      - (2020) – Giulia
      - (2022) – Syuri
    - Outstanding Performance (2021) – Syuri
    - Shining Award
      - (2020) – Giulia
      - (2023) – Maika
- Other titles
  - BS Japan Queen Of The Ring Championship (1 time) – Syuri

== Luchas de Apuestas record ==
Winner (wager)	Loser (wager)	Location	Event	Date	Notes
Tam Nakano (hair)	Giulia (hair)	Tokyo, Japan	All Star Dream Cinderella	March 3, 2021	
