= Kay Gee =

Kay Gee may refer to:

- Kay Gee, Indian cinematographer, see Silsila, Deewaar
- Kier Gist, or KayGee, American DJ, record producer and member of Naughty by Nature

== See also ==
- Kay Gees, funk and disco band
- KGee, Ghanaian rapper
- K-Gee, British music producer and songwriter
- KGEE-FM, former Texas radio station
- KG (disambiguation)
