= Stardom Osaka Dream Cinderella 2020 =

2020 World Wonder Ring Stardom event

- Promotional poster featuring Utami Hayashishita, Giulia and various other superstars
- Promotion: World Wonder Ring Stardom
- Date: December 20, 2020
- City: Osaka, Japan
- Venue: Osaka Prefectural Gymnasium
- Attendance: 1,027

Event chronology
← Previous; Yokohama Cinderella 2020	Next → 10th Anniversary Show

Stardom Osaka Dream Cinderella 2020 (スターダム大阪ドリームシンデレラ2020, Sutādamu Ōsaka dorīmushinderera 2020) was a professional wrestling event promoted by World Wonder Ring Stardom. It took place on December 20, 2020 in Osaka, Japan, at the Osaka Prefectural Gymnasium with a limited attendance due in part to the ongoing COVID-19 pandemic at the time.

Seven matches were contested at the event, including one on the pre-show, and six of Stardom's seven championships were on the line. The main event saw Utami Hayashishita defeat Momo Watanabe to retain the World of Stardom Championship. In another prominent match, Giulia and Syuri went to a time-limit draw in their Winner takes all match for both the Wonder of Stardom Championship and SWA World Championship.

== Storylines ==
The new logo of Stardom established for 2021.

The show featured seven professional wrestling matches that resulted from scripted storylines, where wrestlers portrayed villains, heroes, or less distinguishable characters in the scripted events that built tension and culminated in a wrestling match or series of matches.

=== Event ===
The preshow in which Saya Iida defeated Saya Kamitani and a defending champion Maika for the Future of Stardom Championship was broadcast live on Stardom's YouTube channel. After Mina Shirakawa, Tam Nakano and Unagi Sayaka retained the Artist of Stardom Championship over Stars stablemates Gokigen Death, Mayu Iwatani and Starlight Kid, they announced that they would split up from Stars to act as an independent unit. Since Shirakawa's debut on October 25, 2020, Cosmic Angels acted as a sub-unit of Stars. The sixth match had Donna Del Mondo stablemates Giulia and Syuri ending their short term feud after going into a time-limit draw with both Wonder of Stardom Championship and SWA World Championship on the table. After the match, they peacefully shook hands in sign of mutual respect. Stardom's president Rossy Ogawa revealed the design of the promotion's sleek new black and white logo, ditching the old pink logo.

The main event portraited Utami Hayashishita successfully defending the World of Stardom Championship for the first time in that respective reign against Queen's Quest stablemate and leader Momo Watanabe. After the match concluded, Maika stepped up to challenge Hayashishita for the title in the near future. Maika defeated Hayashishita in the 5STAR Grand Prix tournament, and therefore was expected to make a challenge for the title at some point.

== Results ==
No.	Results	Stipulations	Times
1^{P}	Saya Iida defeated Maika (c) and Saya Kamitani	Three-way match for the Future of Stardom Championship	8:19
2	Oedo Tai (Konami and Natsuko Tora) defeated Riho and Ruaka	Tag team match	7:05
3	Donna Del Mondo (Himeka and Natsupoi) defeated Oedo Tai (Bea Priestley and Saki Kashima)	Tag team match	11:05
4	AZM (c) defeated Mei Hoshizuki	Singles match for the High Speed Championship	10:31
5	Cosmic Angels (Mina Shirakawa, Tam Nakano and Unagi Sayaka) (c) defeated Stars (Gokigen Death, Mayu Iwatani and Starlight Kid)	Six-woman tag team match for the Artist of Stardom Championship	14:00
6	Giulia (Wonder) vs. Syuri (SWA) ended in a time-limit draw	Winner takes all match for both Wonder of Stardom Championship and SWA World Championship	30:00
7	Utami Hayashishita (c) defeated Momo Watanabe	Singles match for the World of Stardom Championship	24:26
(c) / – the champion(s) heading into the match; P / – the match was broadcast on the pre-show
