= KGee =

Ghanaian hiplife artist and rapper

- Birth name: Panford Kofi Gad Manye
- Born: Greater Accra, Ghana
- Genres: Hip hop, Afro-dancehall
- Occupation(s): Rapper, Singer, songwriter
- Labels: Just Amazing Music

Panford Kofi Gad Manye, known by the mononym KGee, is a Ghanaian hiplife and hip-hop rapper. He started as the other half of the hiplife duo KgPM with The PM (also called The Prhyme Minister). They released their debut album titled Saa Na Wotiɛ, which featured Blitz the Ambassador and Obrafour. They later released an Azonto song titled "Xtra Large" which featured Ghanaian singer Atumpan.

== Recognition and musical style ==
KGee started as a member of KgPM in the late 90s but took time off to concentrate on University. He come back with a single No Long Tin which made its way to number 18 on the world chart category on iTunes music store. He also released Dey By You featuring Yaa Pono and Akwaboah.

He owns Just Amazing Music and has signed Spicer and Gemini Orleans to the record label.

KGee released an 11-tracked debut album titled Safari which featured artists like Medikal, DopeNation, KelvynBoy, Gemini Orleans, Spicer Dabz and with song production from Keezyonthebeat, B2 and MOG Beatz.

== Discography ==
=== Album ===
- Safari

=== Singles ===
- No Long Tin
- Dey By You
- Play You
- Encore
