= Stardom Cinderella Tournament 2020 =

2020 World Wonder Ring Stardom event

- Promotional poster of the event featuring various superstars
- Promotion: World Wonder Ring Stardom
- Date: March 24, 2020
- City: Tokyo, Japan
- Venue: Korakuen Hall
- Attendance: 538

Event chronology
| ← Previous; The Way To Major League | Next → Cinderella Summer In Tokyo |

Cinderella Tournament chronology
| ← Previous; 2019 | Next → 2021 |

The 2020 Stardom Cinderella Tournament (スターダムシンデレラトーナメント2020, Sutādamushindereratōnamento 2020) was the sixth annual professional wrestling single-elimination tournament under the Cinderella Tournament branch of events promoted by World Wonder Ring Stardom in Tokyo, Japan. The event took place on March 24, 2020, with a limited attendance due in part to the ongoing COVID-19 pandemic at the time.

== Storylines ==
The show featured thirteen Cinderella Tournament matches and a dark match with scripted storylines, where wrestlers portray villains, heroes, or less distinguishable characters in the scripted events that built tension and culminate in a wrestling match or series of matches. The matches can be won by pinfall, submission or elimination over the top rope. A time-limit draw or a double elimination means a loss for each competitor.

=== Event ===
The first-round matches were broadcast live on Stardom's YouTube channel. The preshow included a dark match in which Sumire Natsu and Hina defeated Itsuki Hoshino and Rina. The tournament had two draws, one between Utami Hayashishita and Maika, and the other one between Hana Kimura and Mayu Iwatani, therefore Tam Nakano and Natsuko Tora received walkover victories straight through the semi-finals. Giulia won the Cinderella Tournament, with her granted wish being a match for the Wonder of Stardom Championship against the then-time champion Arisa Hoshiki. However, Hoshiki retired from professional wrestling on May 20, 2020, leaving Giulia to challenge for the vacant title against Tam Nakano.

== Participants ==
The tournament was composed by 16 competitors including the champions. It was the last event to conclude in a single day.

*Noted underneath are the champions who held their titles at the time of the tournament.

| Wrestler | Unit | Notes |
|---|---|---|
| AZM | Queen's Quest | |
| Giulia | Donna Del Mondo | Winner; Artist of Stardom Champion |
| Hana Kimura | Tokyo Cyber Squad | |
| Jamie Hayter | Oedo Tai | Goddesses of Stardom Champion; SWA World Champion |
| Jungle Kyona | Tokyo Cyber Squad | |
| Konami | Tokyo Cyber Squad | |
| Maika | Donna Del Mondo | Artist of Stardom Champion; Future of Stardom Champion |
| Mayu Iwatani | Stars | World of Stardom Champion |
| Momo Watanabe | Queen's Quest | |
| Natsuko Tora | Oedo Tai | |
| Saki Kashima | Oedo Tai | |
| Saya Kamitani | Queen's Quest | |
| Starlight Kid | Stars | |
| Syuri | Donna Del Mondo | Artist of Stardom Champion |
| Tam Nakano | Stars | |
| Utami Hayashishita | Queen's Quest | |

== Brackets ==
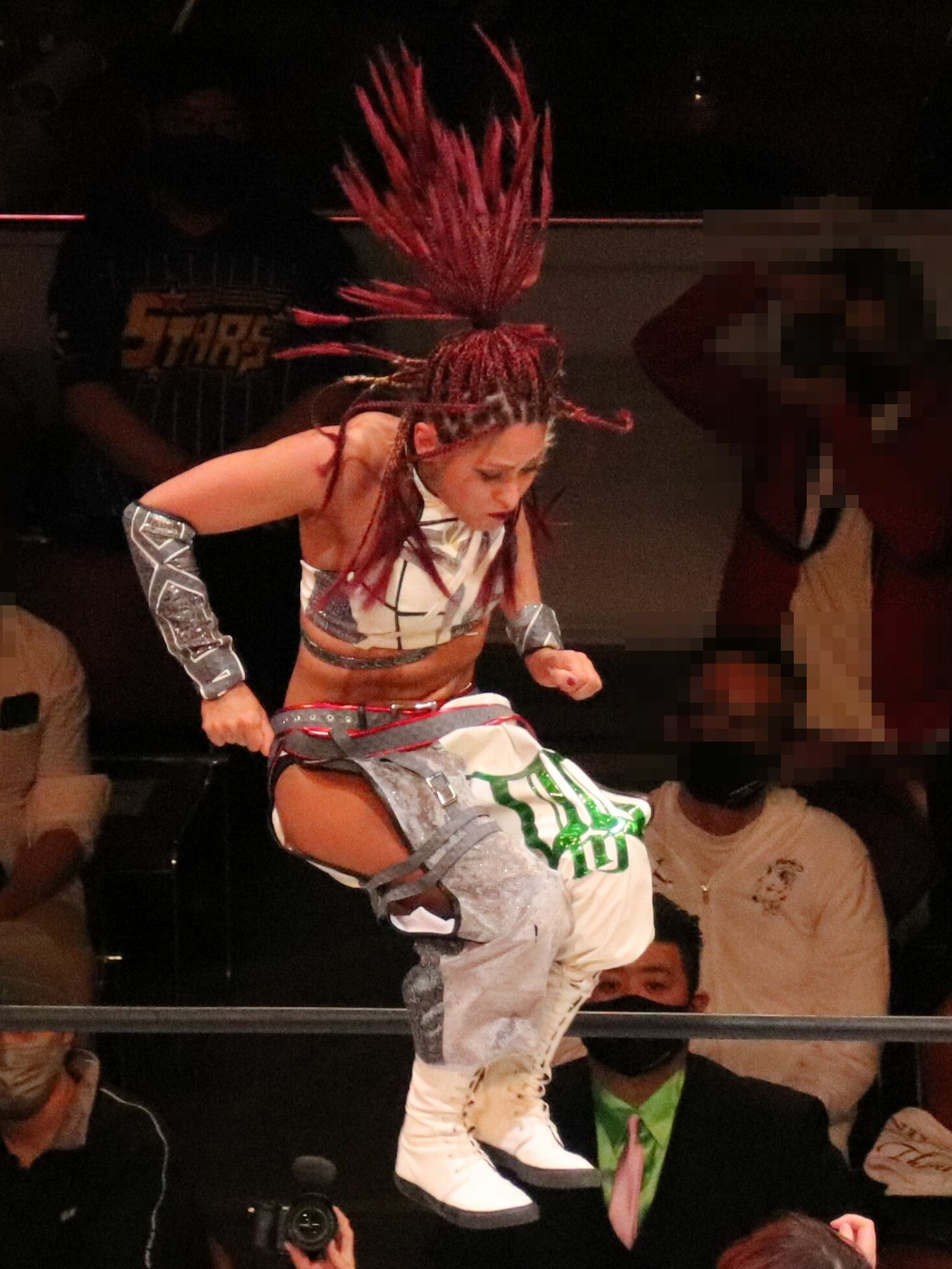
Winner of the 2020 Cinderella Tournament, Giulia.

Round 1
Momo Watanabe | Pin
Starlight Kid | 4:54
Jungle Kyona | Pin
Giulia | 8:23
Konami | Pin
AZM | 2:36
Syuri | Pin
Jamie Hayter | 4:43
Saki Kashima | 5:20
Tam Nakano | Pin
Maika | Draw (Note: Maika and Hayashishita went into a time-limit draw, therefore both getting disqualified from the tournament.)
Utami Hayashishita | 10:00
Hana Kimura | Draw (Note: Kimura and Iwatani went into a draw due to both being unable to continue, therefore both getting disqualified from the tournament.)
Mayu Iwatani | 7:56
Natsuko Tora | Pin
Saya Kamitani | 6:03

Quarterfinals
Momo Watanabe | Pin
Giulia | 4:37
Konami | Pin
Syuri | 4:35
Tam Nakano | N/A
Bye | -
Bye | N/A
Natsuko Tora | -

Semifinals
Giulia | Pin
Syuri | 4:06
Tam Nakano | 3:46
Natsuko Tora | Pin

Final
Giulia | Pin
Natsuko Tora | 12:41
