= Karagarga =

File sharing archive

- Karagarga's banner, featuring their mascot, a raven
- Website type: Internet forum, file sharing
- Website: karagarga.in
- Registration: Required; by invitation only

Karagarga ("black crow" in Turkish), often abbreviated KG, is a members-only Internet forum, BitTorrent tracker, and file sharing archive used primarily for sharing and downloading films considered to be obscure or rare. The website's community of members are dedicated to "creating a comprehensive library of arthouse, cult, classic, experimental and rare movies from all over the world." Karagarga is closed to the public, and is accessible by exclusive invitation only.

Karagarga's archive contains tens of thousands of films, many of which are unavailable for acquisition or viewing by other means. Members are prohibited by the website's moderators from uploading films considered to be Hollywood (or Bollywood) productions or mainstream blockbusters. The archive also contains books, magazines, albums and television series. Beyond sharing media, members have also been known to create subtitles for films in languages not previously made available, such as English subtitles for a number of films by Iranian director Sohrab Shahid-Saless. Subtitles may be requested by contributing ratio credit toward "pots", which is then given to any user who translates and uploads subtitles for the corresponding film.
