= Tokyo Cyber Squad =

Professional wrestling stable

- Official logo of the stable

Stable
- Leader: Hana Kimura
- Members: See below
- Name: International Army
- Debut: April 19, 2019
- Disbanded: October 3, 2020

Tokyo Cyber Squad, often shortened as TCS, was a professional wrestling stable that performed in World Wonder Ring Stardom. The stable was led by Hana Kimura and primarily also consisted of Death Yama-san, Jungle Kyona, Konami, Rina and Ruaka.

== History ==
=== Formation ===
On September 24, 2018, Hana Kimura betrayed Oedo Tai by attacking Kagetsu with a chair during one of his matches. Following the match, Kimura declared that she was no longer affiliated with Oedo Tai. Kimura then began teaming up with numerous foreign wrestlers, forming a loose collective referred to as the International Army. For the 2019 Stardom Draft, International Army was recognized as an official stable and Kimura was designated as the leader. At the draft on April 14, 2019, an elimination match took place between the leaders of the International Army (Kimura), J.A.N. (Jungle Kyona), Oedo Tai (Kagetsu), Queen's Quest (Momo Watanabe) and Stars (Mayu Iwatani) to determine the draft order, with the stipulation that the losing unit had to disband. Kimura earned the final draft spot by eliminating Kyona, which led to J.A.N. disbanding. During the draft, Kimura retained Bobbi Tyler, Mary Apache and Rebel Kel from the International Army, while also drafting Konami from Queen's Quest, Natsumi and Rina from Stars, and Kaori Yoneyama, Jungle Kyona and Ruaka from the now disbanded J.A.N. Although Apache and Natsumi were drafted to the International Army, they never wrestled as a part of the stable.

=== Hana Kimura's leadership (2019-2020) ===
On April 21, 2019, the stable was renamed to Tokyo Cyber Squad. On May 6, Rebel Kel wrestled in Stardom for the last time. On May 6, Kaori Yoneyama debuted her new Death Yama-san gimmick, which is the persona she would continue to use from then on while wrestling with Tokyo Cyber Squad. On May 16, Hana Kimura, Jungle Kyona and Konami won the Artist of Stardom Championship by defeating Stars (Mayu Iwatani, Saki Kashima, and Tam Nakano). At Shining Destiny on June 16, Bobbi Tyler, Death Yama-san and Ruaka faced Zoe Lucas and Stars (Saki Kashima and Saya Iida). During the match, Lucas betrayed her team and joined Tokyo Cyber Squad. On June 23, Kimura, Konami and Kyona lost the Artist of Stardom Championship back to Kashima, Iwatani and Nakano. On July 15, Konami and Kyona won the Goddesses of Stardom Championship by defeating Queen's Quest (Momo Watanabe and Utami Hayashishita). On November 11, Bobbi Tyler wrestled in Stardom for the final time. On December 15, Lucas wrestled in Stardom for the final time.

On January 4, 2020, Leyla Hirsch wrestled alongside Kimura and Kyona, after which Hirsch would continue to wrestle with Tokyo Cyber Squad. On January 19 at Stardom 9th Anniversary Show, Konami and Kyona lost the Goddesses of Stardom Championship to Oedo Tai (Bea Priestley and Jamie Hayter). On February 8, 2020 at Stardom The Way To Major League, Kimura, Kyona and Konami lost a number one contendership match for the Artist of Stardom Championship against Oedo Tai (Natsuko Tora, Natsu Sumire and Saki Kashima), and Death Yama-san and Leila Hirsch won a gauntlet tag team match by last eliminating the team of 3838 Tag (Saya Iida and Saya Kamitani). On March 11, Hirsch left Japan to return home, meaning she could no longer participate as a member of Tokyo Cyber Squad. On May 23, Kimura committed suicide.

=== Post-Kimura (2020, 2021) ===
At Yokohama Cinderella 2020 on October 3, 2020, Jungle Kyona and Konami faced Oedo Tai (Natsuko Tora and Saki Kashima) in a match in which the losing unit had to disband. During the match, Konami betrayed Tokyo Cyber Squad by hitting Kyona with a steel chair, leading to Tokyo Cyber Squad losing and disbanding.

At the first Hana Kimura Memorial Show from May 23, 2021, Konami and Kaori Yoneyama "reunited" the stable for one night only as they teamed up with Kagetsu and Hazuki who represented the old Oedo Tai and fell short to Asuka, Syuri, Natsupoi, and Mio Momono in an eight-woman tag team match.

== Members ==
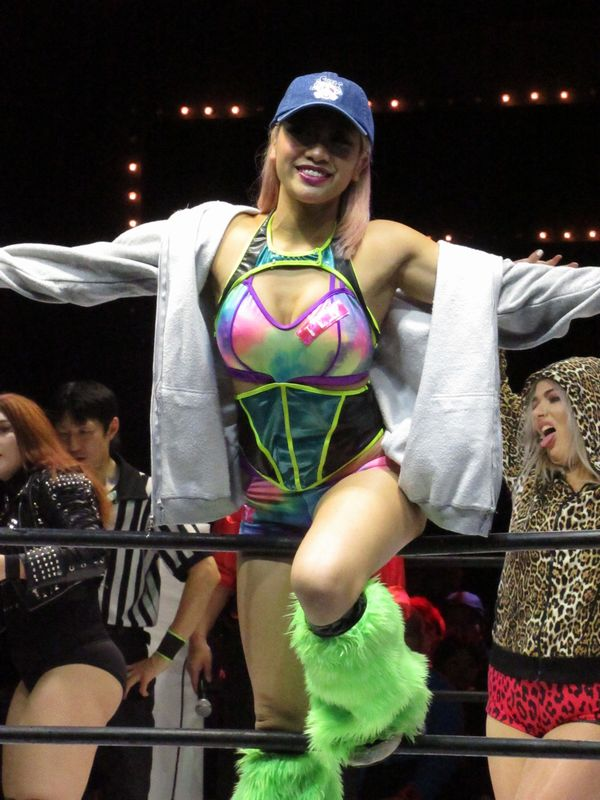
Hana Kimura

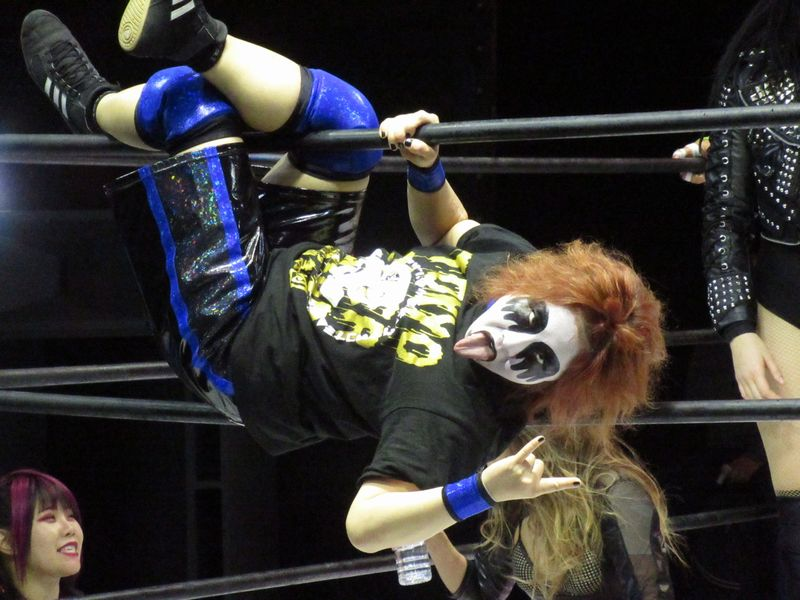
Death Yama-san

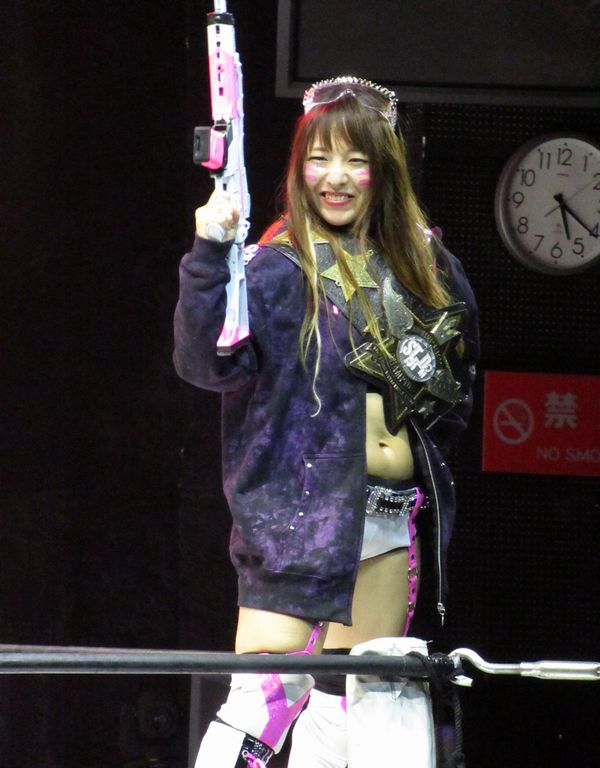
Jungle Kyona

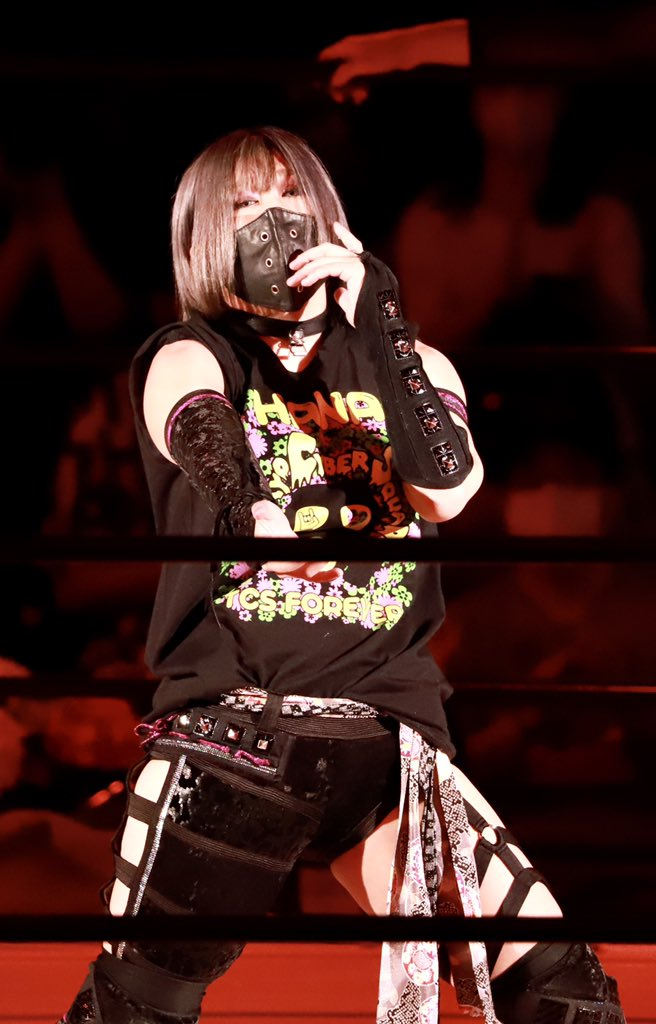
Konami

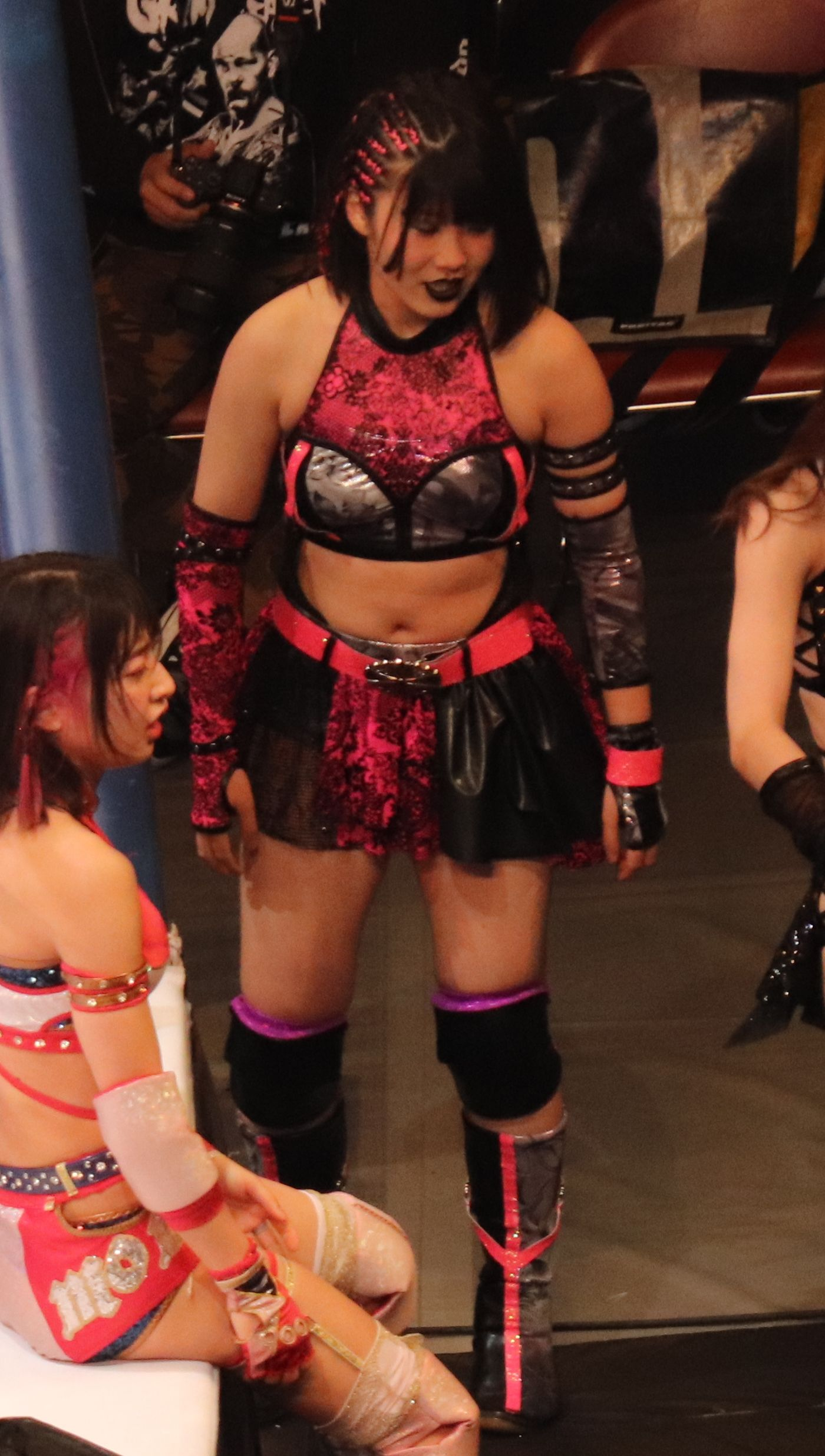
Rina

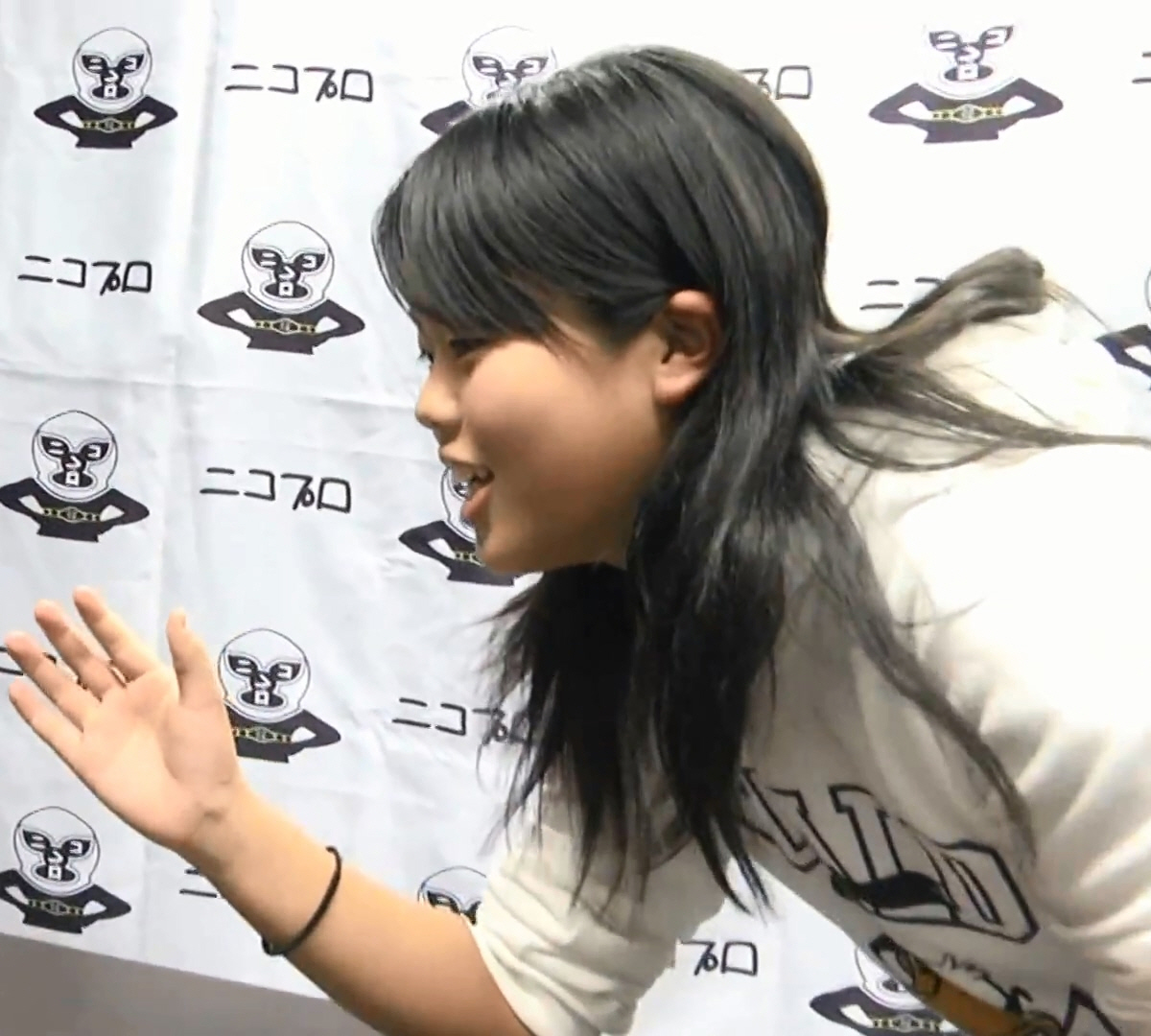
Ruaka

| * | Founding member |
| L | Leader |

| Member | | Joined | Left |
|---|---|---|---|
| Hana Kimura | *L | April 19, 2019 | May 23, 2020 |
| Bobbi Tyler | * | April 19, 2019 | November 15, 2019 |
| Death Yama-san | * | April 19, 2019 | October 3, 2020 |
| Jungle Kyona | * | April 19, 2019 | October 3, 2020 |
| Konami | * | April 19, 2019 | October 3, 2020 |
| Mary Apache | * | April 19, 2019 | April 19, 2019 (Note: Mary Apache and Natsumi were drafted to the International Army but never wrestled as a part of the stable.) |
| Natsumi | * | April 19, 2019 | April 19, 2019 |
| Rebel Kel | * | April 19, 2019 | May 6, 2019 |
| Rina | * | April 19, 2019 | October 3, 2020 |
| Ruaka | * | April 19, 2019 | October 3, 2020 |
| Zoe Lucas | | June 16, 2019 | December 15, 2019 |
| Leyla Hirsch | | January 4, 2020 | March 11, 2020 |

== Championships and accomplishments ==
- Ironfist Wrestling
  - Ironfist Women's Championship (1 time) – Lucas
- Pro Wrestling Illustrated
  - Ranked Hana Kimura No. 61 of the top 100 female singles wrestlers in the PWI Women's 100 in 2019
  - Ranked Jungle Kyona No. 64 of the top 100 female singles wrestlers in the PWI Women's 100 in 2019
  - Ranked Konami No. 68 of the top 100 female singles wrestlers in the PWI Women's 100 in 2019
  - Ranked Zoe Lucas No. 86 of the top 100 female singles wrestlers in the PWI Women's 100 in 2019
- Revolution Pro Wrestling
  - Undisputed British Women's Championship (1 time) – Lucas
- World Wonder Ring Stardom
  - Artist of Stardom Championship (1 time) – Kimura, Kyona and Konami
  - Goddesses of Stardom Championship (1 time) – Kyona and Konami
  - Stardom Year-End Award (2 times)
    - Best Tag Team Award – Kyona and Konami (2019)
    - Fighting Spirit Award – Kimura (2019)
