= Gemini Orleans =

- Also known as: Gemi Sosa, Dopest Rapper
- Born: Victor Mawuli Orleans-Fiaka; May 29, 1989 (age 36); Leklebi, Ghana
- Genres: Hip hop, rap, afrobeats
- Occupations: Rapper, songwriter
- Instruments: Vocals, keyboards
- Years active: 2009–present
- Label: Orleans-Fiaka Recordings

Gemini Orleans (born Victor Mawuli Orleans-Fiaka; born May 29, 1989) is a Ghanaian hip hop artist and musician known for his rap music and the Afrobeats genre.

== Early life ==
Orleans was born to Christian “Papa Brown” Orleans-Fiaka and Wilhelmina Rose Orleans-Fiaka on May 29, 1989, at Mataheko, a suburb of Accra, in the Greater Accra Region of Ghana.

== Education ==
He attended Aggrey Memorial for his secondary education before continuing to study BSc. Banking and Finance degree programme at the University of Professional Studies.

== Career ==
He started his career rapping at age fifteen in Aggrey Memorial A.M.E. Zion Secondary School and by the time he was through in 2007 he was awarded the best rapper of his year group at their annual awards night program held by the school authorities.

He has collaborated with the likes of EL, Edem and Sarkodie and other artists and participated in performances that highlight his talent and expand his reach within the music industry.

== Production ==
- Gemini Orleans - Rap Exercise Ft EL (prod. by X Family)
- Gemini Orleans - Fiona Ft Kelvyn Boy
- Gemini Orleans - Communicate
- Gemini Orleans - CYS Remix
- Gemini Orleans - Tempted Ft J.Derobie
