= Syuri =

Japanese professional wrestler and mixed martial artist

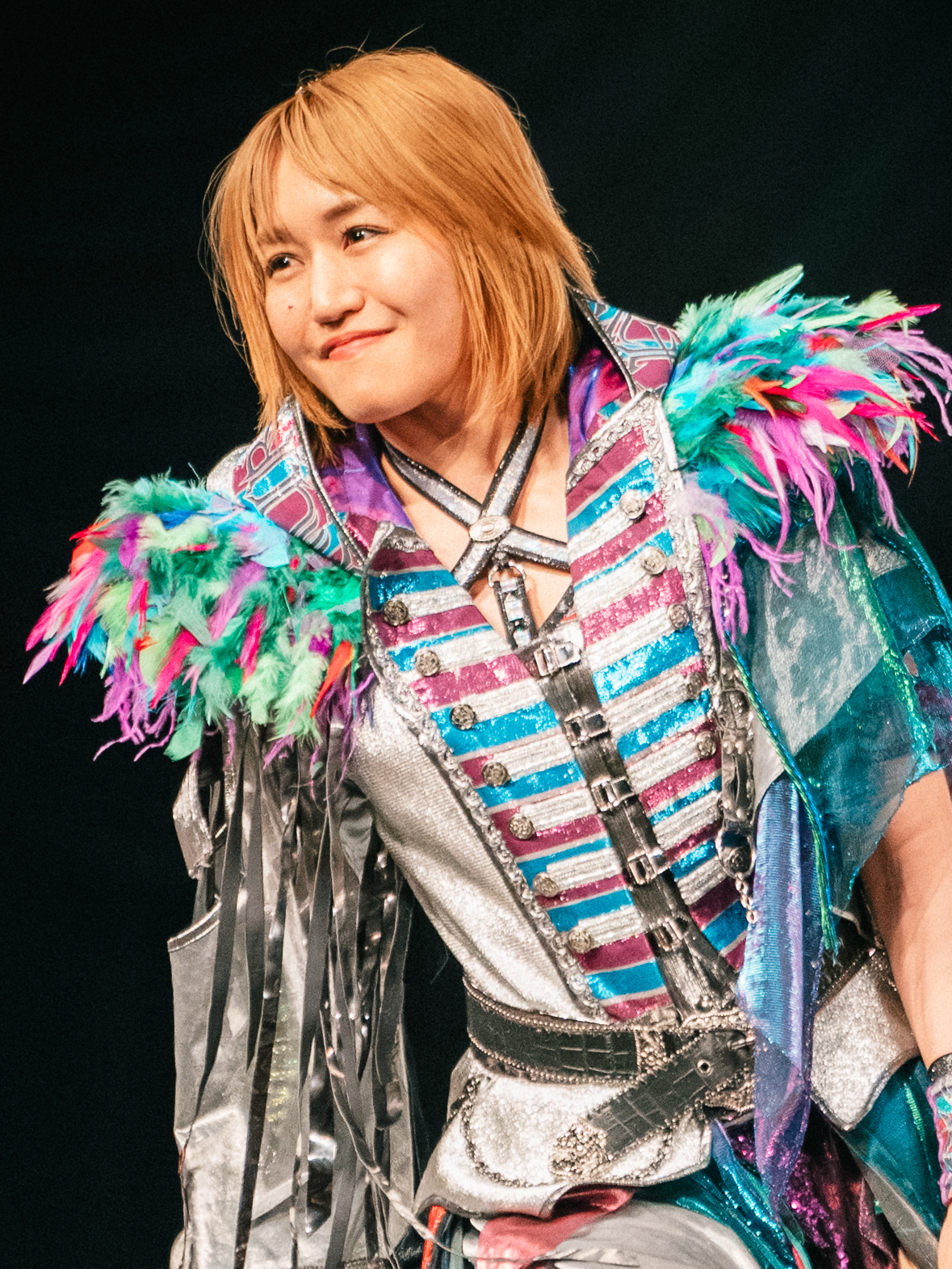
- Syuri in April 2025

Personal information
- Born: Syuri Kondo; February 8, 1989 (age 37) Ebina, Kanagawa, Japan
- Website: Syuri Smile

Professional wrestling career
- Ring name(s): Ant Lady; KG; Kirigakure Saizō; Syuri; Syu☆ri
- Billed height: 1.64 m (5 ft 4 1/2 in)
- Billed weight: 58 kg (128 lb)
- Trained by: Akira Nogami; Akira Shoji; Hajime Ohara; Yoshihiro Tajiri
- Debut: October 26, 2008

Syuri Kondo (近藤 朱里, Kondō Shuri; born February 8, 1989), mononymously known as Syuri (朱里, Shuri), is a Japanese professional wrestler, shoot boxer, kickboxer and mixed martial artist. She is currently signed with World Wonder Ring Stardom, where she is the leader of God's Eye and is a champion in New Japan Pro Wrestling as the current IWGP Women's Champion in her second reign. She is a former NJPW Strong Women's Champion and World of Stardom Champion.

Syuri started her professional wrestling career in Hustle, where she performed under the ring name KG (Karate Girl). Syuri later worked for Hustle's two follow-up promotions; Smash, where she was the final Smash Diva Champion, and Wrestling New Classic (WNC), where she was a two-time WNC Women's Champion. After WNC folded in June 2014, Syuri remained affiliated with its sister promotion Reina Joshi Puroresu until March 2016, becoming a one-time Reina World Women's Champion and a one-time Reina World Tag Team Champion. Syuri also worked for Consejo Mundial de Lucha Libre (CMLL) through their working relationship with Reina, where she is a former CMLL World Women's Champion and CMLL-Reina International Champion. Syuri debuted in Stardom in 2013 and is a former one-time World of Stardom Champion, one-time SWA World Champion and one-time Goddesses of Stardom Champion. Syuri is also the winner of the 2021 5 Star Grand Prix.

Coming from a karate background, Syuri made her shoot boxing debut in 2009 in Krush as a kickboxer. Over the following six years, Syuri amassed a record of 13 wins and one loss, while also becoming the inaugural Krush Women's Flyweight Champion in March 2014. In April 2016, Syuri transitioned to mixed martial arts by joining Pancrase, where she was the inaugural Strawweight Queen of Pancrase. In September 2017, Syuri made her Ultimate Fighting Championship debut.

== Early life ==
Kondo was born to a Filipino mother and a Japanese father in Ebina, Kanagawa. She started practicing karate in primary school, winning numerous titles, and also excelled in track and field sports in junior high school and tennis in high school. After graduation, she worked as a model for fashion magazines and as a movie extra, before passing an audition held by professional wrestling promotion Hustle.

== Professional wrestling career ==
=== Hustle (2008–2009) ===
On October 26, 2008, Syuri made her professional wrestling debut for Hustle in a match where she, working under the ring name KG (short for Karate Girl), teamed with HG and RG to defeat Big C, Onigumo and Piranha Monster. Syuri joined Tajiri's Hustle Union Army stable, formed a tag team with stablemate Banzai Chie, and started an intergender rivalry with Rey Ohara. Syuri remained with the promotion until it ceased its operations in late 2009.

=== Smash (2010–2012) ===
When the Smash was formed in December 2009, Syuri was named as a part of the new roster. While in Hustle, Syuri had wrestled almost exclusively against male wrestlers as a novelty due to the lack of other female wrestlers in the promotion. But in Smash, Syuri was poised to become a more serious female wrestler. Syuri, now working under the ring name Syuri, made her Smash debut at the promotion's inaugural event on March 26, 2010, losing to Meiko Satomura. Following a match on May 29, Syuri had a heated confrontation and backstage brawl with Kana, who announced her arrival to Smash earlier and was sitting in the audience. This led to the main event of Smash's June 25 show, where Syuri defeated Kana in a fourteen-minute-long match, ending a three-match losing streak. However, Kana defeated Syuri in a rematch on July 24 in just three minutes via submission.

For the next several events, Syuri wrestled against female workers from other independent promotions, who were looking for regular spots on the Smash roster. On September 24, Syuri was defeated in a hardcore match by freelancer Kaoru, after which Kana entered the ring, pushed Kaoru away, and helped Syuri backstage. On November 22, Syuri and Kana teamed together to defeat Ice Ribbon's Emi Sakura and JWP Joshi Puroresu's Kaori Yoneyama. As a result, Syuri was granted a shot at Yoneyama's JWP Openweight Championship at Happening Eve on December 24, but Syuri was unsuccessful in her attempt to win what would have been her first title. Syuri's streak of big matches and her growing popularity among fans eventually led to fellow Smash Seikigun member Lin Byron growing jealous of her, turning heel, and leaving the group to start a rivalry with Syuri. This was followed by Byron picking up back-to-back tag team victories over Syuri on January 29 and 30, leading to a singles match on February 25, where Syuri was victorious.

On March 21, 2011, Syuri made her debut for Ice Ribbon, losing to Hikaru Shida. The match eventually led to a partnership between Syuri and Shida. After defeating Chii Tomiya and Makoto on April 16, Syuri and Shida went on to unsuccessfully challenge Emi Sakura and Ray for the International Ribbon Tag Team Championship on May 5. The partnership also carried over to Smash, where Syuri and Shida defeated Io Shirai and Mio Shirai on May 3. On May 14, Syuri, Tajiri and Hajime Ohara, traveled to Mexico to represent Smash at Toryumon's DragonMania VI event. Syuri teamed with Lluvia and Marcela to defeat La Comandante, Dalys la Caribeña and Mima Shimoda in a six-woman tag team match. Upon returning to Japan, Syuri avenged her Ice Ribbon loss by defeating Hikaru Shida on June 9 in the first round of a tournament to determine the inaugural Smash Diva Champion. On August 11, Syuri was eliminated from the tournament in the semifinals by Kana, who would go on to become the inaugural champion. On October 28, Lin Byron made her return to Smash after a four-month break, and reignited her rivalry with Syuri. On November 24, Syuri defeated Byron in a hardcore match, after which the two made peace with each other. On February 10, Smash announced that the promotion would be folding after its March 14 event, after which Syuri would become a free agent. On February 19, Syuri defeated Kana to win the Smash Diva Championship for the first time, after which the two longtime rivals hugged and made peace with each other. In Syuri's final Smash appearance on March 14, she teamed with Mentallo in a tag team match, where they were defeated by Kana and Último Dragón. After the match, Syuri officially retired the Smash Diva Championship.

=== Wrestling New Classic and Reina (2012–2016) ===
On April 5, 2012, Tajiri announced the formation of Wrestling New Classic (WNC), and named Syuri as part of the promotion's roster. At WNC's first event on April 26, Syuri teamed with Makoto in a tag team match, where they were defeated by Kana and Mio Shirai. On May 12, Syuri returned to Mexico to take part in Toryumon Mexico's DragonMania VII event, where she was defeated by Kana. On May 24 at WNC's second event, Starting Over, Syuri teamed with Kana in a Tag Team Match, where they defeated Makoto & Riho. Three days later at Go! Go! West: Hiroshima, Syuri worked the main event for the first time in WNC, when she, Akira & Dave Finlay defeated Kana, Mikey Whipwreck & Tajiri in a Six-Person Tag Team Match. From May 29 to June 24, Syuri took part in Pro Wrestling Wave's 2012 Catch the Wave tournament, where she wrestled in a round-robin block made up of members of the White Tails stable. After a victory over Mio Shirai, a loss against Kana, and draws against Shuu Shibutani and Ayumi Kurihara, Syuri finished at four points and failed to advance to the semifinals of the tournament. Back in WNC, Syuri started portraying a villainous character, first announcing that she was tired of having to wrestle the same opponents all the time, and then after veteran freelancer Ayako Hamada was revealed as her next opponent, by claiming that she had never even heard of her. Syuri also began sympathizing with Akira, who had recently turned on Tajiri, feeling disgruntled by the supposed changes that had taken place since the transition from Smash. The match took place on July 15 and saw Hamada pick up the win. Following the loss, Syuri attacked Kana, who tried to help her backstage, quit the WNC Seikigun, and joined a new villainous stable formed by Akira & StarBuck. The three wrestled their first match as a unit on August 2, defeating Hajime Ohara, Kana & Tajiri in a Six-Person Tag Team main event. The trio continued their winning ways during the following two days by first defeating the trio of Kana, Tajiri & Yusuke Kodama in the main event of an Osaka show, and then the trio of Hanzo, Kana & Seiki in a semi-main event in Hiroshima. On August 30, the trio main evented another WNC event in Korakuen Hall, defeating Kana, Mikey Whipwreck & and Tajiri in a Barbed Wire Board Deathmatch, during which Syuri took a bump onto one of the barbed wire boards. Syuri, Akira & StarBuck were also victorious in a rematch the following day in Osaka. The trio's win streak ended on September 1 in Toyohashi, when Kana, Whipwreck & Tajiri were victorious in the third and final Barbed Wire Board Deathmatch between the two teams. In the main event of the following WNC event on September 17, Syuri was defeated by Kana via submission in a Tag Team Match, where she and Akira faced Kana & Tajiri. Three days later, Syuri was defeated by Tajiri in an Intergender Match at Korakuen Hall.

On September 25, Syuri returned to Pro Wrestling Wave, when she and Shuu Shibutani entered the 2012 Dual Shock Wave tournament, opening their round-robin block with a win over the team of Hikaru Shida & Yumi Ohka. After suffering a defeat against Kurigohan (Ayumi Kurihara & Mika Iida), Syuri & Shibutani defeated 1st Impact (Makoto & Moeka Haruhi) in their final round-robin match to finish at the top of their block, tied with Shida & Ohka, forcing a decision match between the two teams. Syuri & Shibutani ended up winning the decision match but were defeated in the finals of the tournament by the team of Misaki Ohata & Tsukasa Fujimoto. On October 24, Syuri, Akira & StarBuck named their stable "Synapse". Two days later, Syuri entered the WNC Women's Championship tournament, defeating Lin Byron in her first-round match. On November 28, Syuri defeated Jessica Love to advance to the finals of the tournament. On December 27, Syuri defeated Nagisa Nozaki to win the tournament and become the inaugural WNC Women's Champion. Two days later, Syuri announced that she was going to produce her own event, titled Stimulus, on February 8, 2013, at Shinjuku Face. Syuri's first match as the WNC Women's Champion ended in defeat, when she, Akira, and Synapse's newest member, Shinya Ishikawa, were defeated by Makoto, Mitoshichi Shinose & Tajiri in a Six-Person Tag Team main event on January 25, 2013, with Makoto pinning her for the win. Two days later, Syuri avenged the loss by defeating Makoto in a Non-Title Singles Match. On February 8, Syuri & Hikaru Shida were defeated in the main event of Stimulus by the team of Meiko Satomura & Tomoka Nakagawa. On March 31, Syuri lost the WNC Women's Championship to Makoto in her first defense. On April 14, Syuri made an unadvertised debut for World Wonder Ring Stardom, taking part in a Gauntlet Match, where the soon-to-retire Yuzuki Aikawa faced every wrestler in the promotion. Syuri's participation in the match ended in a one-minute time limit draw with Aikawa. On April 25 at WNC's one year anniversary event, Syuri received a rematch for the WNC Women's Championship in a Seven-Way Match, which also included Arisa Nakajima, Command Bolshoi, Kayoko Haruyama, Nikki Storm, and Lin Byron, who pinned Makoto to win the title. On April 29, Syuri returned to World Wonder Ring Stardom to take part in the promotion's big Ryōgoku Cinderella event at Ryōgoku Kokugikan, teaming with Hiroyo Matsumoto & Kaori Yoneyama in a Six-Woman Tag Team Match, where they were defeated by Mika Nagano, Nanae Takahashi & Tsukasa Fujimoto. On May 15, Syuri returned to Pro Wrestling Wave to take part in the 2013 Catch the Wave tournament. She finished her round-robin block on June 19 with a record of three wins, two draws, and one loss, winning her block and advancing to the semifinals. On July 14, Syuri returned to Ice Ribbon for the first time in over two years, losing to Hikaru Shida in a Singles Match. The following day, Syuri was eliminated from the 2013 Catch the Wave tournament in the semifinals by JWP representative Arisa Nakajima. On August 7, Syuri entered a three-woman round-robin tournament to determine the new WNC Women's Champion, defeating Makoto and earning a spot in the finals. In her second round-robin match on August 8, Syuri was defeated by fellow finalist, Serena. In the finals of the tournament two days later, Syuri was again defeated by Serena.

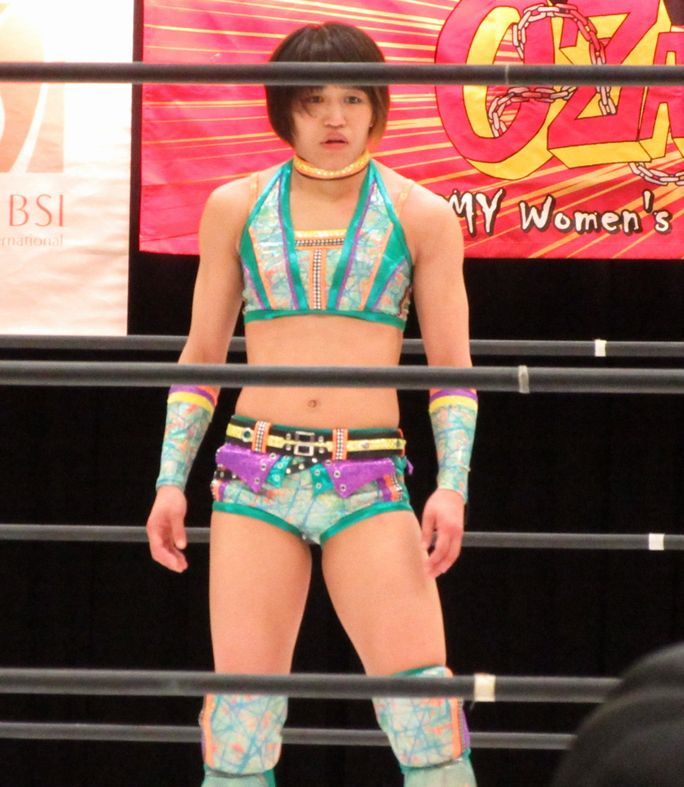
Syuri in May 2016

On September 18, Syuri defeated Serena in a rematch to become the first two-time WNC Women's Champion. Two days later, Syuri defeated Zeuxis in a decision match at a Reina Joshi Puroresu event to become the second Reina World Women's Champion. The following day, Syuri made her debut for the Wrestle-1 promotion, defeating Makoto in a singles match. Afterward, Syuri was sidelined with lower back pain but was still attacked at the September 29 WNC event by Yumiko Hotta, who had earlier laid claim to the Reina World Women's Championship. Syuri returned from her injury at a Reina event on October 4, where she, La Vaquerita, and Zeuxis defeated Hotta, Keiko Aono & Yuiga via Disqualification. On October 17, Syuri took part in a big generational 8-on-8 Elimination Match promoted by Sendai Girls' Pro Wrestling, where she, Hikaru Shida, Kagetsu, Manami Katsu, Sareee, Takumi Iroha, Yoshiko & Yuhi defeated Aja Kong, Command Bolshoi, Dump Matsumoto, Dynamite Kansai, Kyoko Inoue, Manami Toyota, Meiko Satomura & Takako Inoue. Syuri was eliminated from the match after wrestling Kyoko Inoue to a ten-minute time-limit draw. On October 31, Syuri defeated Yumiko Hotta for her first successful defense of both the Reina World Women's Championship and the WNC Women's Championship. On November 18, WNC and Reina held a press conference to announce that Syuri had signed a dual contract with the two promotions, making her the first female wrestler to hold such a contract. With Syuri's help, Reina looked to establish a professional wrestling promotion in her mother's native country, the Philippines. On November 29, Syuri made her second successful defense of the WNC Women's Championship against previous champion Lin Byron. On December 22, Syuri won yet another title, when she defeated La Comandante in a decision match to become the new CMLL-Reina International Champion. On January 18, 2014, Syuri made a non-wrestling appearance at the New Japan Pro-Wrestling (NJPW) and Consejo Mundial de Lucha Libre (CMLL) co-produced Fantastica Mania 2014 event in Korakuen Hall, handing a bouquet of flowers to Rey Cometa & Stuka Jr. before their match. On January 25, Syuri successfully defended the WNC Women's Championship, the CMLL-Reina International Championship, and the Reina World Women's Championship against Mia Yim at a WNC-Reina event in Manila, Philippines. On February 16 at Reina's re-launch event, Syuri successfully defended her Triple Crown against Silueta. Syuri then started a storyline rivalry with Aki Shizuku, who was looking to take over her spot as the "ace" of Reina. On February 27, Akira announced that the Synapse stable had decided to disband, emancipating Syuri who had not portrayed a villain for months. On March 9, Syuri successfully defended the Reina World Women's Championship against Kyoko Kimura.

On April 15, Syuri returned to Mexico to work for CMLL. In her first match of the tour, Syuri teamed with Estrellita & Silueta in a Six-Woman Tag Team Match, where they were defeated by La Amapola, Dalys la Caribeña & Tiffany with La Amapola, the number one contender to the CMLL-Reina International Championship, pinning Syuri for the win. In the title match five days later, Syuri lost the CMLL-Reina International Championship to La Amapola. While in Mexico, Syuri trained with Negro Casas, from whom she adopted the Casas family's trademark la magistral as a finishing move, using it to pin La Amapola for the win in a Six-Woman Tag Team Match on April 21. Syuri's Mexican tour concluded the following day. On May 29, Syuri received a rematch for the CMLL-Reina International Championship back in WNC but was again defeated by La Amapola. On June 18, it was announced that WNC would be shutting down following June 26. The promotion's female wrestlers, Syuri included, remained affiliated with Reina Joshi Puroresu. At WNC's final event on June 26, Syuri successfully defended the Reina World Women's Championship against Aki Shizuku. On August 30 at the final CMLL-Reina Fiesta 2014 event, Syuri unsuccessfully challenged Marcela for the CMLL World Women's Championship. On September 30, Syuri made her fifth and final successful defense of the WNC Women's Championship against Makoto, before the title was retired. On October 30, Syuri produced an event named Syuri Matsuri ("Syuri Festival") in Shinjuku Face, which saw her team with Shiro Koshinaka in a main event tag team match, where they were defeated by Kyoko Kimura & Masaaki Mochizuki. On November 20, Syuri entered a tournament to determine the new Reina World Tag Team Champions, alongside the debuting Lin Byron, who had surprisingly nominated herself as Syuri's partner. The team made it to the finals of the tournament but were there defeated by Arisa Nakajima & Kana when Syuri was betrayed by Byron, who had been paid off by Kana.

On December 12, Syuri defeated Marcela to win the CMLL World Women's Championship for the first time. On December 26, Syuri lost the Reina World Women's Championship to Kana. Syuri made her first successful defense of the CMLL World Women's Championship on January 12 against Shuu Shibutani. On January 19, Syuri took part in CMLL and NJPW's Fantastica Mania 2015 event in Korakuen Hall. On February 25, Syuri & Hikaru Shida defeated Arisa Nakajima & Kana to win the Reina World Tag Team Championship. They made their first successful title defense on March 7 against Kana's stablemates Makoto & Rina Yamashita. Syuri then formed her own stable, named Syuri-gun ("Syuri Army"), to continue opposing Kana's Piero-gun ("Clown Army"). On March 25, Syuri made her second successful defense of the CMLL World Women's Championship against Silueta. Three days later, Syuri returned to Mexico, starting another tour with CMLL. During the tour, Syuri went undefeated for her first six matches, before losing to Marcela in a "Lightning Match" (One Fall Match) on April 6. This led to a Two Out of Three Falls rematch on April 10, where Syuri lost the CMLL World Women's Championship to Marcela. The match also marked the end of Syuri's CMLL tour. On June 13, Syuri & Shida lost the Reina World Tag Team Championship to Piero-gun's Makoto & Rina Yamashita. On July 12, Syuri defeated Cat Power to win the Elite Canadian Championship Wrestling (ECCW) Women's Championship. On August 29, Syuri made her American debut, when she took part in a World of Unpredictable Wrestling (WUW) event in Brooklyn, New York, teaming with Karen & Marcela in a Six-Woman Tag Team Match, where they defeated Mari Sakamoto, Miss Mojo & Solo Darling. On October 9, Syuri & Silueta defeated Makoto & Rina Yamashita to win the Reina World Tag Team Championship. Over the next month, Syuri took part in a tournament to determine the new Reina World Women's Champion, making it to the finals, where she was defeated by Tsukasa Fujimoto. Afterward, Syuri left for another tour of CMLL. Syuri continued leading her own stable, now known as Narcissist-gun, until December 26, 2015, when she disbanded it after she and her stablemates Buffalo & Mineo Fujita were defeated in a Six-Person Tag Team Match by Shiri Gamikyō (Hikaru Shida, Jun Kasai & Toru Owashi). On January 31, 2016, Syuri announced she would be leaving Reina following March 25. On February 28, Syuri lost the ECCW Women's Championship back to Cat Power. On March 16, Syuri & Silueta relinquished the Reina World Tag Team Championship due to Syuri's impending departure from the promotion. On March 25, Syuri wrestled her final Reina match, where she and Maki Narumiya defeated Maya Yukihi & Risa Sera.

=== Freelancing (2016–2020) ===
On September 11, 2016, Syuri won her first title as a freelancer, when she and Hikaru Shida defeated Kaori Yoneyama & Tsubasa Kuragaki for the Oz Academy Tag Team Championship. Syuri & Shida won another title on November 23, when they defeated Dash Chisako & Kaoru for the Sendai Girls World Tag Team Championship. Syuri & Shida lost the Oz Academy Tag Team Championship to Akino & Kaho Kobayashi in their fourth defense on June 25, 2017. On July 15, Syuri & Shida lost the Sendai Girls World Tag Team Championship to Cassandra Miyagi & Dash Chisako also in their fourth defense.

=== World Wonder Ring Stardom (2020–present) ===
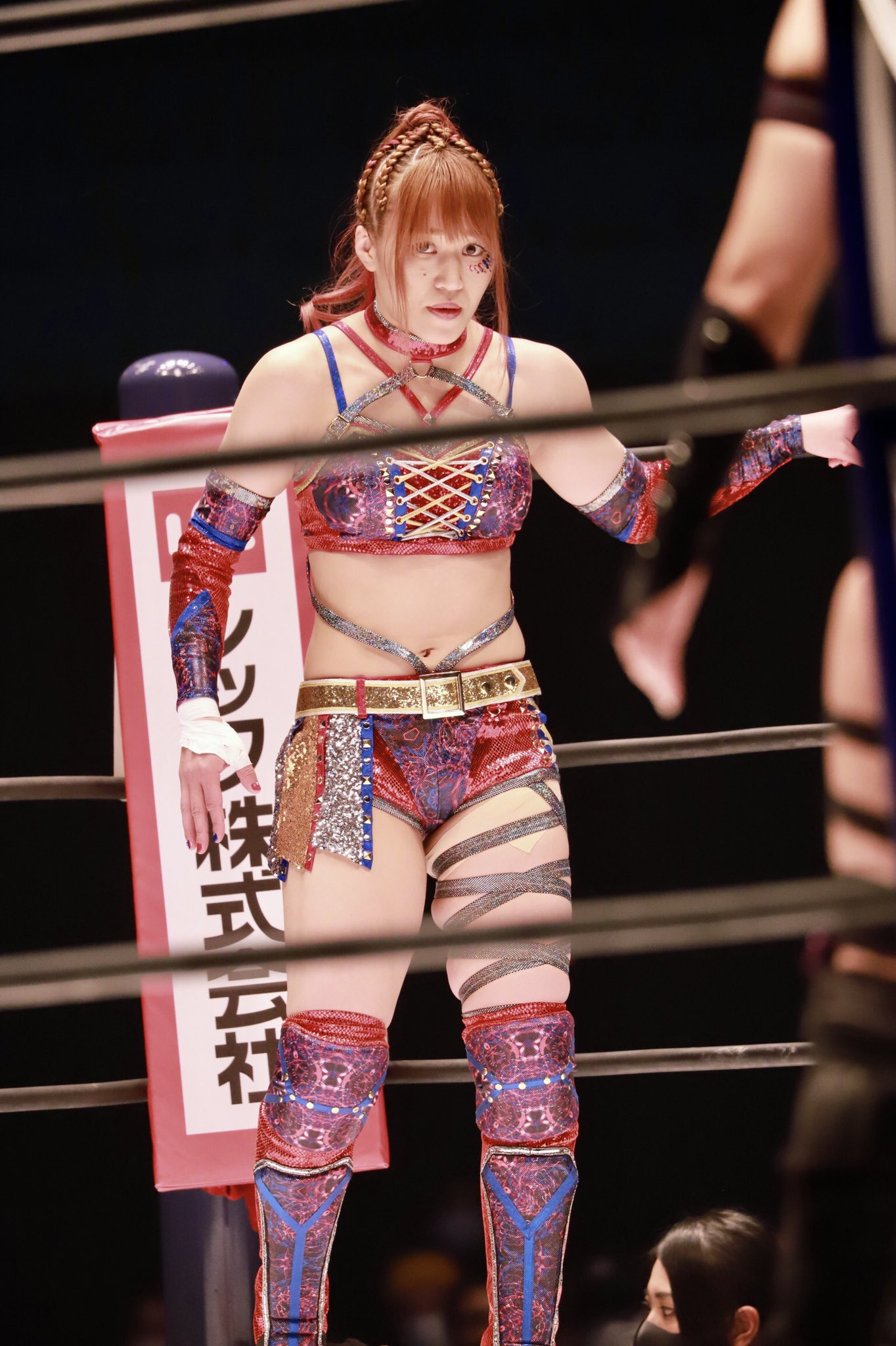
Syuri in 2021

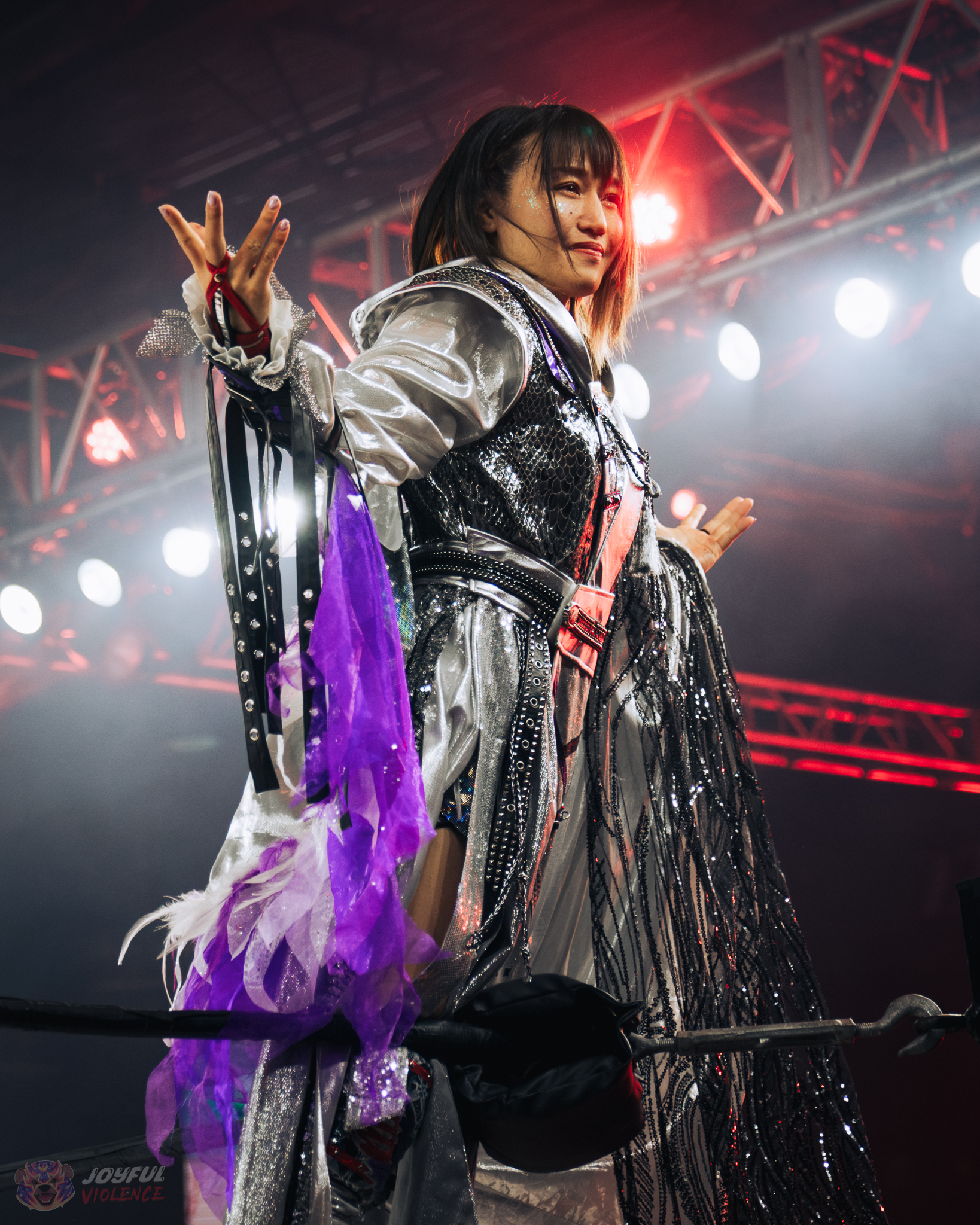
Syuri in April 2024

==== Donna Del Mondo (2020–2022) ====
On January 19, 2020, Syuri made her return to Stardom as the newest member of Donna Del Mondo. Alongside her stablemates, Giulia and Maika, she defeated Tokyo Cyber Squad (Death Yama-san, Hana Kimura and Leyla Hirsch). On February 8, Donna Del Mondo defeated Queen's Quest (AZM, Momo Watanabe and Utami Hayashishita) to win the Artist of Stardom Championship. On March 24, Syuri participated in the 2020 Cinderella Tournament and made it to the semi-final, where she lost to the fellow Donna Del Mondo member Giulia. On October 3, after Syuri unsuccessfully challenged Mayu Iwatani for the World of Stardom Championship, Syuri announced that she had signed with Stardom. On November 14, Syuri, Giulia and Maika lost the Artist of Stardom Championship to Oedo Tai (Bea Priestley, Natsuko Tora and Saki Kashima). On November 15, Syuri defeated Bea Priestley to win the SWA World Championship, which Syuri was eligible to wrestle for because of her Filipino heritage from her mother. On December 20, Syuri defended the SWA World Championship in a title vs. title match against Giulia, who defended the Wonder of Stardom Championship. The match ended in a time-limit draw, so both wrestlers retained their titles.

On April 4, 2021, Syuri and Giulia defeated MaiHime to win the Goddesses of Stardom Championship. After that, Syuri and Giulia would later name their tag team Alto Livello Kabaliwan, with Alto Livello meaning "high level" in Italian and Kabaliwan meaning "madness" in Tagalog, with the name embracing both Syuri's Filipino heritage and Giulia's Italian heritage. On September 25, Syuri won the 2021 5 Star Grand Prix after defeating Momo Watanabe in the finals. On October 9, at Osaka Dream Cinderella, Syuri defeated Saki Kashima to retain the SWA World Championship. Originally, the match was supposed to be against Konami, but due to an illness, Konami's stablemate Saki Kashima competed in her place. On December 29, at Dream Queendom, Syuri defeated Utami Hayashishita to win the World of Stardom Championship. Syuri then vacated the SWA World Championship to focus on defending the World of Stardom Championship.

==== God's Eye (2022–present) ====
On January 29, 2022, at Nagoya Supreme Fight, Syuri secured her first title defense as the World of Stardom Champion against her stablemate Mirai. At Stardom Cinderella Journey on February 23, 2022, Syuri teamed up with Maika and Himeka to defeat Donna Del Mondo stablemates Giulia, Mai Sakurai and Thekla in six-woman tag team competition, hinting a slow detachment from the unit's principles mainly caused by her World Championship reign and her feud with Giulia, events which eventually conducted to a world title confrontation between the two. On March 26, at Stardom World Climax 2022, Syuri scored her second title defense of the World of Stardom Championship against her teammate and tag team partner Giulia. After the match, Syuri decided to leave Donna Del Mondo in order to create her own unit named God's Eye. The first member to join the newly created stable was Ami Sohrei and ex-Donna Del Mondo member Mirai. After defecting Donna Del Mondo, Syuri spent the next months feuding with several ex-stablemates. On the finals night of the Stardom Cinderella Tournament 2022 from April 29, Syuri retained the World of Stardom Championship against Himeka for the third consecutive time in that respective reign. At Stardom Golden Week Fight Tour on May 5, 2022, she retained the world title against Maika. At Stardom Flashing Champions on May 28, 2022, Syuri scored another successful title defense against Risa Sera. One month later at Stardom Fight in the Top on June 26, 2022, Syuri teamed up with Mirai and Ami Sohrei to unsuccessfully challenge retaining team of Oedo Tai (Saki Kashima, Momo Watanabe and Starlight Kid) for the Artist of Stardom Championship in a bout which also included Donna Del Mondo (Giulia, Maika and Mai Sakurai). In the next couple of months during the events of the Stardom Mid Summer Champions pay-per-view, Syuri would move on to successfully defend the World Championship against Momo Watanabe and Tam Nakano.

After ten title defenses, Syuri lost the World of Stardom Championship to former stablemate and tag team partner Giulia at Dream Queendom 2, ending Syuri's reign at exactly one year.

At New Years Stars 2024 on January 3, 2024, Syuri, Ami Sohrei and Mirai, together known as Abarenbo GE, participated in the 2024 Triangle Derby. They defeated Baribari Bombers in the finals to win the tournament and the Artist of Stardom Championship.

At Stardom All Star Grand Queendom 2025 on April 27, 2025, Syuri defeated Mayu Iwatani to win the IWGP Women's Championship, ending Iwatani's 735-day-long reign, which was the longest of any NJPW-sanctioned championship at the time. On June 21, 2025, at The Conversion, Syuri lost the title to Sareee, ending her reign at 55 days. After losing the title, Syuri announced that she will be taking a break from Stardom and go on an overseas excursion. That was confirmed when she appeared at BUSHIROAD affiliated promotion All Elite Wrestling for AEW All In in Arlington, Texas.

=== New Japan Pro Wrestling (2021–present) ===
On January 5, 2021, on the second night of New Japan Pro-Wrestling (NJPW)'s Wrestle Kingdom 15, Syuri made her first NJPW appearance, where she, alongside Giulia, defeated Iwatani & Tam Nakano in a dark match. On October 13, 2025 at King of Pro-Wrestling, Syuri defeated Sareee to become a two-time IWGP Women's Champion.

=== All Elite Wrestling (2025–present) ===
On July 12, 2025 at All In, Syuri made her All Elite Wrestling (AEW) debut as participant in the women's Casino Gauntlet match, but failed to win.

== Shoot boxing and kickboxing career ==
Syuri
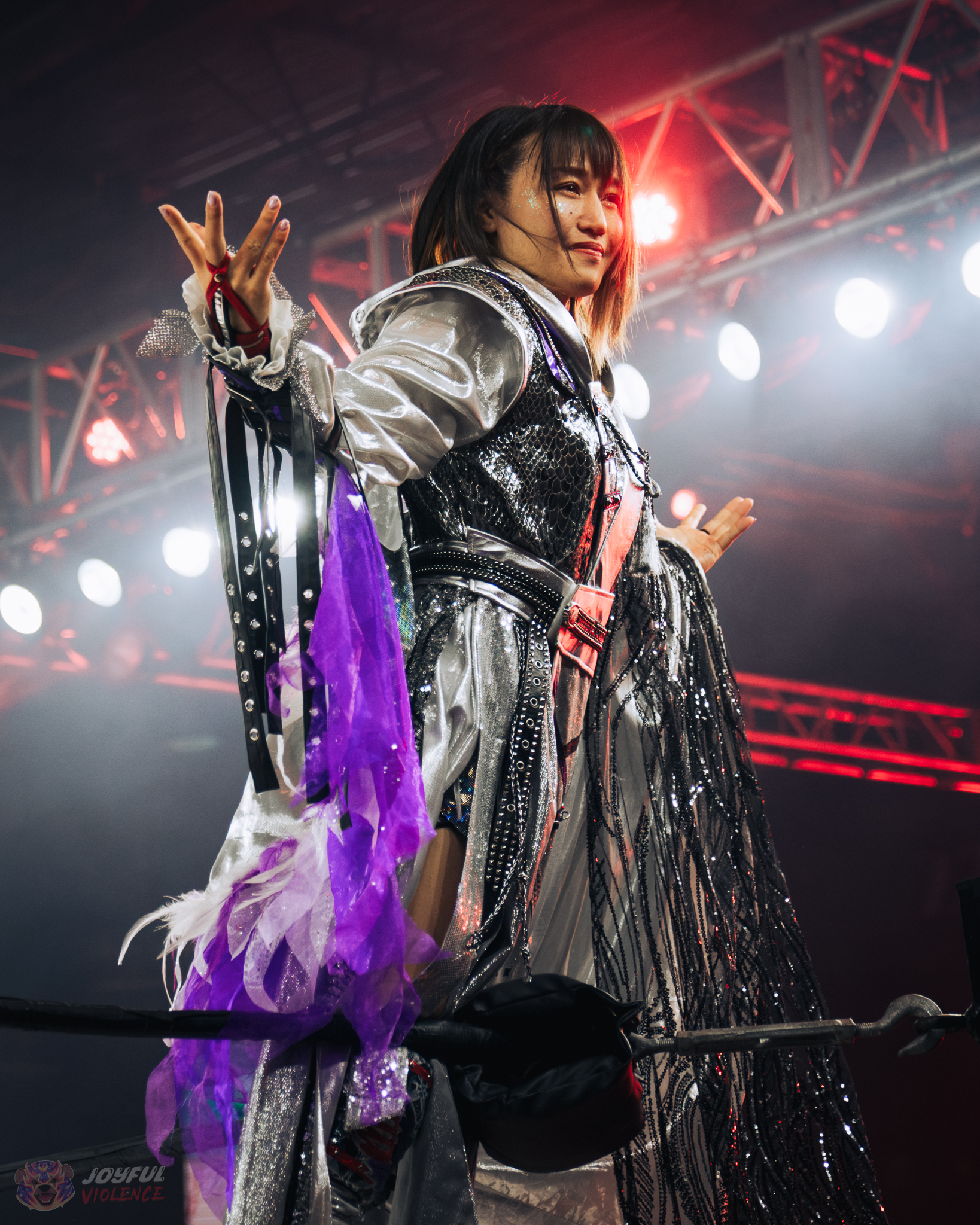
- Born: Syuri Kondo; February 8, 1989 (age 37); Ebina, Kanagawa
- Nationality: Japanese
- Height: 1.64 m (5 ft 5 in)
- Weight: 58 kg (128 lb; 9 st 2 lb)
- Division: Strawweight
- Style: Kickboxing, Shootboxing, Wrestling, Karate
- Team: Vos Gym
- Years active: 2009–present

Kickboxing record
- Total: 14
- Wins: 13
- Losses: 1

Mixed martial arts record
- Total: 9
- Wins: 6
- By knockout: 1
- By decision: 5
- Losses: 3
- By knockout: 1
- By decision: 2

Other information
- Website: Syuri Smile
- Mixed martial arts record from Sherdog
- Last updated on: September 23, 2017

On December 11, 2009, Kondo made her shoot boxing debut for the Jewels promotion at Jewels 6th Ring, defeating Asako Saioka via unanimous decision. At the end of the year, the promotion named her the Rookie of the Year. In her second match on February 13, 2010, Kondo picked up a majority decision victory over Fuka. On November 11, 2011, it was announced that Kondo would be making her kickboxing debut for the Krush promotion on January 9, 2012. On December 15, Miyako Mitsuhori was named Kondo's opponent at the event. At the weigh-ins the day prior to the match, Kondo weighed in at 0.4 kg (0.88 lb) over the weight limit of 52 kg (115 lb) and was, as a result, given a one-point deduction penalty in the first round and being forced to wear ten-ounce gloves as opposed to her opponent's eight-ounce gloves. Despite the handicap, Kondo would go on to win the match with a majority decision. On March 7, Krush announced that Kondo would return for her second fight in the promotion on April 22 at Krush-Ex 2012. On March 19, Yukari Sakamoto was named Kondo's opponent. Kondo ended up dominating the fight and winning a unanimous decision. On July 10, Syuri's third kickboxing match was announced as taking place on August 12 at Krush.21, where she would face Emiko Matsumoto. In the match, Kondo scored her first knockout win, defeating Matsumoto 66 seconds into the second round. On September 21, Krush announced that Kondo would return to the promotion on November 10 at Krush.24, where she would face Miku Hayashi. In the end, Kondo earned another unanimous decision victory to remain undefeated in her kickboxing career. On May 21, 2013, Krush announced Kondo's next match for June 2, when she would face Taiwanese fighter Chen Wei-ting. Syuri went on to win the fight via unanimous decision. Kondo's next fight took place at an event held by the J-Girls promotion as opposed to Krush, where she, on September 1, defeated Yayoi Sanchez with a unanimous decision.

On November 19, it was announced that Kondo would be returning to Krush on January 4, 2014, when she would enter a four-woman tournament to determine the first Krush Women's Champion. On January 4, Kondo defeated Yayoi Sanchez for the second time a row with a unanimous decision to advance to the finals of the tournament. In the finals of the tournament on March 16, Kondo faced Miku Hayashi in a rematch of their Krush.24 match. At the end of three rounds of fighting, one judge gave the match to Kondo with a score of 30–29, while the other two scored it 29–29, meaning that the match had to be decided in a fourth extra round. All three judges gave the extra round to Kondo with a score of 10–8, making her the inaugural Krush Women's Champion. On June 2, it was announced that Kondo would be making her first title defense on July 13 against Kanako Taniyama. Kondo won the match with another unanimous decision, making her first successful defense of the Krush Women's Championship. Kondo made her second successful title defense on December 21 with a unanimous decision win over Aki Gracyer. On January 17, 2015, it was announced that Kondo's next fight would be taking place in the K-1 promotion on February 1, when she would face Chinese fighter E Meidie in Changsha, China. The non-title match ended in Kondo's first defeat, losing via unanimous decision. On August 6, it was announced that Kondo would be making her third defense of the Krush Women's Championship against Tomoko SP on September 12. Kondo won the fight with a unanimous decision. Kondo would vacate the Krush Women's Championship after signing with Pancrase.

== Mixed martial arts career ==
=== Pancrase (2016–2017) ===
On January 30, 2016, it was announced that Kondo would be making her mixed martial arts debut for Pancrase on April 24. She had been training MMA since the previous December with Eiji Mitsuoka and Hideki Kadowaki. Her debut match opponent was later revealed as Kanna Asakura. Kondo won her MMA debut via unanimous decision. Kondo's second MMA fight took place on July 24, when she defeated Nicolle Angelica Caliari via unanimous decision. Kondo's third fight took place on November 13, when she defeated Sharma Devaiah via TKO due to punches in the first round. On February 5, 2017, Kondo defeated Minna Grusander via unanimous decision in the main event of Pancrase 284 to remain undefeated. On May 28 at Pancrase 287, Kondo defeated Kinberly Tanaka Novaes via unanimous decision to become the inaugural Strawweight Queen of Pancrase.

=== Ultimate Fighting Championship (2017–2021) ===
On July 13, 2017, it was reported that Kondo had been signed to make her Ultimate Fighting Championship (UFC) debut on September 23 at UFC Fight Night: Saint Preux vs. Okami, facing Chan-Mi Jeon. Kondo won the fight with a split decision. For her second fight, Kondo faced Poliana Botelho on May 19, 2018. at UFC Fight Night 129. She lost the fight via TKO due to a body kick and punches just 33 seconds into the first round. Kondo's third opponent was Yan Xiaonan, in a fight that took place on November 24, 2018, at UFC Fight Night 141. She lost the fight via unanimous decision. In her fourth fight, Kondo faced Ashley Yoder on June 22, 2019, at UFC on ESPN+ 12. She lost the fight via unanimous decision.

In February 2021, it was reported that Kondo and UFC had parted ways.

== Other media ==
In 2011, Kondo began working with female idol group Apple Tale. The collaboration, named "Apple Tale with Syuri", released its debut album, Chouzetsu Otome: Musha Shugyou Hen (超絶乙女～武者修行編～), on January 13, 2012. In 2013, Kondo released her first gravure DVD, titled Watashi. From June 20 to 22, 2014, Kondo was a part of stage acting group Mizuiro Kakumei, working three performances in Tokyo. In August 2015, Kondo released a photobook entitled Syuri.

== Championships and accomplishments ==
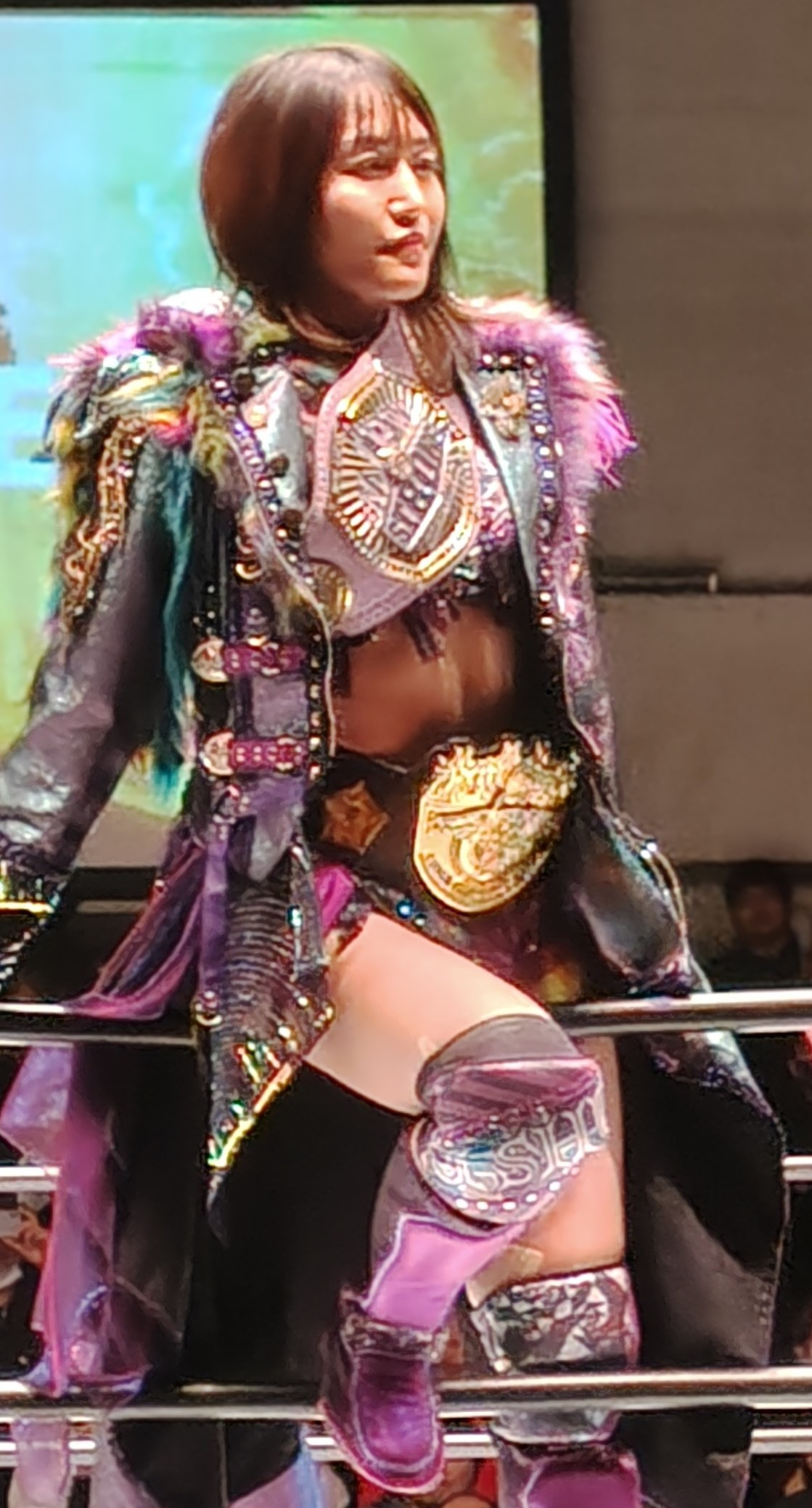
In New Japan Pro-Wrestling, Syuri is a two-time and current IWGP Women's and former Strong Women's Champion.

=== Kickboxing and shoot boxing ===
- Jewels
  - Rookie of the Year (2009)
- Krush
  - Krush Women's Championship (1 time)
  - Krush Women's Championship Tournament (2014)

=== Mixed martial arts ===
- Pancrase
  - Women's Strawweight Championship (1 time)

=== Professional wrestling ===
- Oz Academy
  - Oz Academy Tag Team Championship (1 time) – with Hikaru Shida
- New Japan Pro-Wrestling
  - IWGP Women's Championship (2 times, current)
  - Strong Women's Championship (1 time)
- Pro Wrestling Illustrated
  - Ranked No. 1 of the top 150 female singles wrestlers in the PWI Women's 150 in 2022
  - Ranked No. 3 of the top 50 Tag Teams in the PWI Tag Team 50 in 2021 – with Giulia
- Pro Wrestling Wave
  - Catch the Wave Award (1 time)
    - Best Bout Award (2012) vs. Ayumi Kurihara on June 24
- Reina Joshi Puroresu
  - CMLL World Women's Championship (1 time)
  - CMLL-Reina International Championship (1 time)
  - ECCW Women's Championship (1 time)
  - Reina World Tag Team Championship (2 times) – with Hikaru Shida (1) and Silueta (1)
  - Reina World Women's Championship (1 time)
- Sendai Girls' Pro Wrestling
  - Sendai Girls Tag Team Championship (1 time) – with Hikaru Shida
- Smash
  - Smash Diva Championship (1 time, final)
- Tokyo Sports
  - Women's Wrestling Grand Prize (2022)
- World Wonder Ring Stardom
  - Artist of Stardom Championship (2 times) – with Giulia and Maika (1) and Mirai and Ami Sohrei (1)
  - Goddess of Stardom Championship (2 times) – with Giulia (1) and Konami (1)
  - SWA World Championship (1 time)
  - World of Stardom Championship (1 time)
  - Triangle Derby (2024) – with Ami Sohrei and Mirai
  - 5★Star GP (2021)
  - 5★Star GP Award (2 time)
    - 5★Star GP Blue Stars Best Match Award (2020) vs. Utami Hayashishita on September 19
    - 5★Star GP Blue Stars Best Match Award (2021) vs. Takumi Iroha on September 25
  - Stardom Year-End Award (3 times)
    - Best Match Award (2022) – vs. Giulia at Dream Queendom
    - Best Unit Award (2020) as part of Donna del Mondo, shared with Giulia, Himeka, Maika and Natsupoi
    - MVP Award (2022)
- Wrestling New Classic
  - WNC Women's Championship (2 times)
  - WNC Women's Championship Tournament (2012)
- Wrestling Observer Newsletter
  - Women's Wrestling MVP (2022)
  - 5.5 star match vs. Utami Hayashishita (2021)
- Other titles
  - Queen of the Ring Championship (1 time, current)

== Fight records ==
=== Mixed martial arts record ===
Professional record breakdown
9 matches	6 wins	3 losses
By knockout	1	1
By decision	5	2

Res.	Record	Opponent	Method	Event	Date	Round	Time	Location	Notes
Loss	6–3	Ashley Yoder	Decision (unanimous)	UFC Fight Night: Moicano vs. Korean Zombie	June 22, 2019	3	5:00	Greenville, South Carolina, United States	
Loss	6–2	Yan Xiaonan	Decision (unanimous)	UFC Fight Night: Blaydes vs. Ngannou 2	November 24, 2018	3	5:00	Beijing, China	
Loss	6–1	Poliana Botelho	TKO (body kicks and punches)	UFC Fight Night: Maia vs. Usman	May 19, 2018	1	0:33	Santiago, Chile	
Win	6–0	Chan-Mi Jeon	Decision (split)	UFC Fight Night: Saint Preux vs. Okami	September 23, 2017	3	5:00	Saitama, Japan	
Win	5–0	Kinberly Tanaka Novaes	Decision (unanimous)	Pancrase 287	May 28, 2017	5	5:00	Tokyo, Japan	Won the Pancrase Women's Strawweight Championship.
Win	4–0	Minna Grusander	Decision (unanimous)	Pancrase 284	February 5, 2017	3	5:00	Tokyo, Japan	
Win	3–0	Sharma Devaiah	TKO (punches)	Pancrase 282	November 13, 2016	1	3:38	Tokyo, Japan	
Win	2–0	Nicolle Caliari	Decision (unanimous)	Pancrase 279	July 24, 2016	3	5:00	Tokyo, Japan	
Win	1–0	Kanna Asakura	Decision (unanimous)	Pancrase 277	April 24, 2016	3	3:00	Tokyo, Japan	

=== Kickboxing record ===
14 Fights, 13 Wins, 1 Losses, 0 Draws
Result	Record	Opponent	Method	Event	Date	Round	Time	Location	Notes
Win	13–1–0	Tomoko SP	Decision (unanimous)	Krush.58	September 12, 2015	3	3:00	Bunkyo, Tokyo, Japan	For the Krush Women's Championship.
Loss	12–1–0	E Meidie	Decision (unanimous)	K-1 China vs. Japan	February 1, 2015	3	3:00	Changsha, Hunan, China
Win	12–0–0	Aki Gracyer	Decision (unanimous)	Krush.48 in Sendai	December 21, 2014	3	3:00	Sendai, Miyagi, Japan	For the Krush Women's Championship.
Win	11–0–0	Kanako Taniyama	Decision (unanimous)	Krush.43	July 13, 2014	3	3:00	Bunkyo, Tokyo, Japan	For the Krush Women's Championship.
Win	10–0–0	Miku Hayashi	Decision (unanimous)	Krush-Ex 2014 Vol. 1	March 16, 2014	4	2:00	Shinjuku, Tokyo, Japan	Finals of a tournament for the Krush Women's Championship.
Win	9–0–0	Yayoi Sanchez	Decision (unanimous)	Krush.36	January 4, 2014	3	2:00	Bunkyo, Tokyo, Japan
Win	8–0–0	Yayoi Sanchez	Decision (unanimous)	J-Girls 2013: Victorious Goddess 4th	September 1, 2013	3	2:00	Shinjuku, Tokyo, Japan
Win	7–0–0	Chen Wei-ting	Decision (unanimous)	Krush-Ignition 2013 vol.4	June 2, 2013	3	2:00	Shinjuku, Tokyo, Japan
Win	6–0–0	Miku Hayashi	Decision (unanimous)	Krush.24	November 10, 2012	3	2:00	Bunkyo, Tokyo, Japan
Win	5–0–0	Emiko Matsumoto	KO (straight right)	Krush.21	August 12, 2012	2	1:06	Bunkyo, Tokyo, Japan
Win	4–0–0	Yukari Sakamoto	Decision (unanimous)	Krush-Ex 2012 Vol. 1	April 22, 2012	3	2:00	Shinjuku, Tokyo, Japan
Win	3–0–0	Miyako Mitsuhori	Decision (majority)	Krush.15	January 9, 2012	3	2:00	Bunkyo, Tokyo, Japan	Kondo did not make weight.
Win	2–0–0	Fuka	Decision (majority)	Shoot Boxing 25th Anniversary Series	February 13, 2010	3	3:00	Shinjuku, Tokyo, Japan	Shoot boxing rules.
Win	1–0–0	Asako Saioka	Decision (unanimous)	Jewels 6th Ring	December 11, 2009	3	2:00	Shinjuku, Tokyo, Japan	Shoot boxing rules.

Legend: Win Loss Draw/No contest
