= Leyla Hirsch =

American professional wrestler

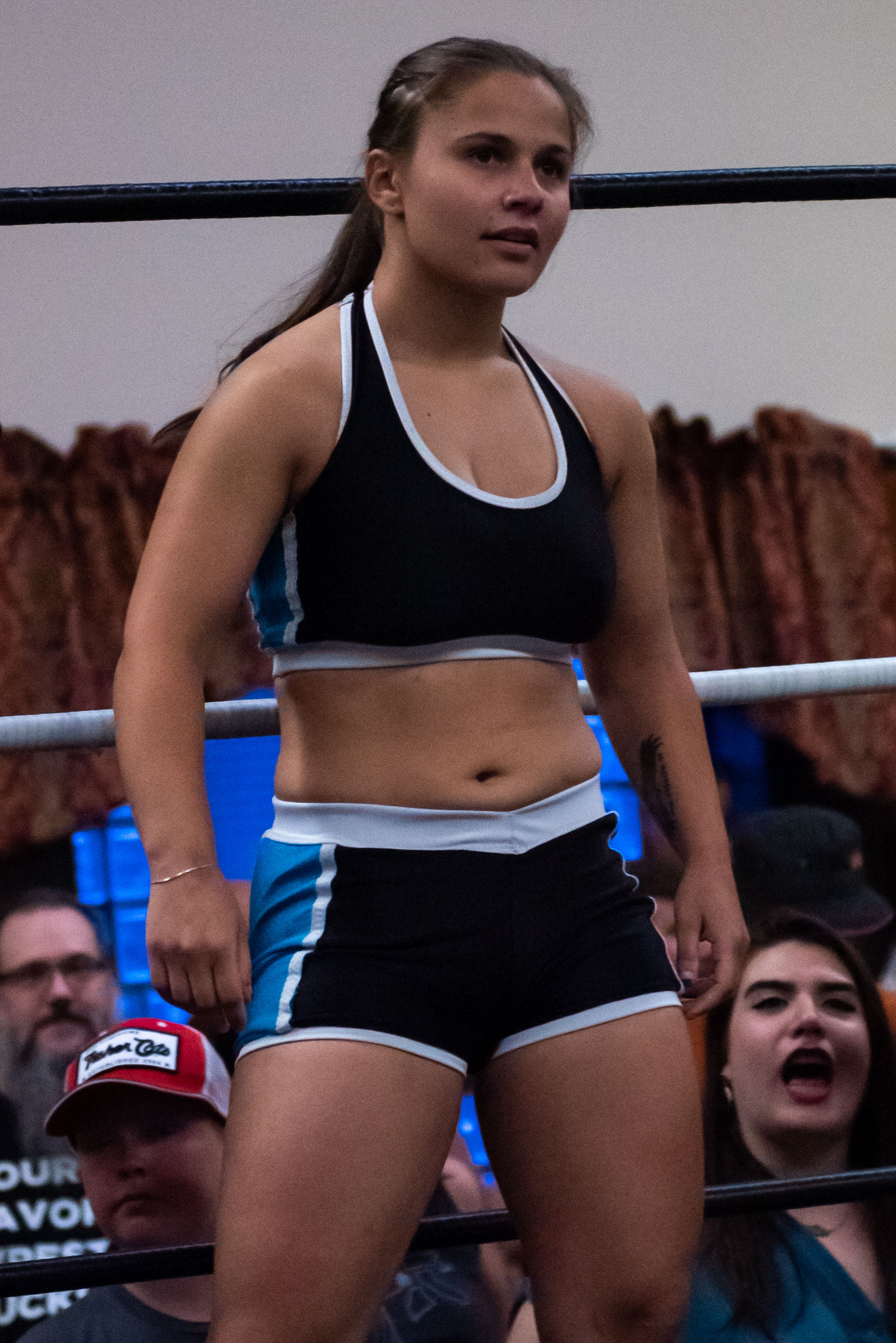
- Hirsch in July 2019

Personal information
- Born: September 27, 1996 (age 29) Moscow, Russia

Professional wrestling career
- Ring name: Leyla Hirsch
- Billed height: 4 ft 11 in (150 cm)
- Billed weight: 125 lb (57 kg)
- Trained by: Joe Gacy
- Debut: 2017

Leyla Hirsch (Russian: Лейла Хирш; born September 27, 1996) is a Russian-born American professional wrestler. She is best known for her tenure in All Elite Wrestling (AEW) and its sister promotion Ring of Honor (ROH). Before joining AEW in 2020, Hirsh was active on the independent circuit, primarily in the northeastern United States, and also performed for Japanese promotions.

== Early life ==
Hirsch was born in Moscow, Russia and lived there until being adopted by an American couple at age eight, subsequently being raised in Hillsborough Township, New Jersey. At 15 years old, she began amateur wrestling in high school and college.

== Professional wrestling career ==
=== Independent circuit (2017–present) ===
Hirsch made her professional wrestling debut at Combat Zone Wrestling's Dojo Wars: Super Show 4 event on September 29, 2017, where she lost to Dojo DEEJ in a intergender match. During her time in CZW, she worked with other infamous personalities such as Penelope Ford, whom she faced at CZW Greetings From Asbury Park on February 23, 2018, in a losing effort. She even challenged Eran Ashe for the CZW Medal of Valor Championship in a last man standing match at CZW Dojo Wars SuperShow Seventeen on February 15, 2019, but unsuccessfully. Hirsch also competed in Westside Xtreme Wrestling, making her debut against Valkyrie at wXw Road To World Tag Team Festival: Neumünster on September 14, 2019. She fought in the wXw Femmes Fatales 2019 Tournament where she managed to reach the final match, the prize being a wXw Women's Championship at the 19th Anniversary show. She eventually got defeated by LuFisto. Hirsch had a brief run with the Japanese promotion World Wonder Ring Stardom, where she was a part of the Tokyo Cyber Squad stable and often fought alongside her fellow stablemates Hana Kimura, Jungle Kyona and Konami. On August 28, 2021, Hirsch faced Kamile at NWA Empowerrr for the NWA World Women's Championship, which Hirsch lost.

=== All Elite Wrestling / Ring of Honor (2020–2025) ===
On October 21, 2020, Hirsch made her AEW debut on AEW Dark where she lost to Hikaru Shida. The following day on AEW Dynamite, she unsuccessfully challenged Serena Deeb for the NWA World Women's Championship. On November 11 on AEW Dark Hirsch picked up her first win AEW win against Tesha Price. On February 4, 2021, on Dynamite, she took part in the AEW Women's World Championship Eliminator Tournament, losing to Thunder Rosa in the first round. It was confirmed on March 15 by AEW president Tony Khan that Hirsch had officially signed with the company. On August 4 on AEW Dynamite Homecoming, Hirsch faced The Bunny in a NWA World Women's title eliminator which Hirsch won. From December till March 2022, Hirsch feuded with Kris Statlander and Red Velvet. Hirsch would face Statlander at Revolution's buy-in show, turning up victorious. On April 6, Hirsch suffered a torn ACL in an AEW Dark Elevation taping. Six weeks later, she underwent surgery.

On the July 6, 2023, episode of ROH on Honor Club, Hirsch returned from her injury and made her debut for AEW's sister promotion Ring of Honor (ROH), replacing Maria Kanellis in a six person tag match, where she teamed with The Kingdom (Matt Taven and Mike Bennett) to take on The Infantry, in which Hirsch scored the victory after submitting Trish Adora. In a post-match promo, Hirsch declared that she would focus on ROH going forward. Hirsch defeated Adora again by submission on July 21, during the pre-show of Death Before Dishonor. After the match, Hirsch reapplied her submission on Adora until Skye Blue made the save.

On December 27, 2023, Hirsch entered the inaugural ROH Women's World Television Championship tournament and was victorious against Rachael Ellering in the first round, but was eliminated by Red Velvet in the second round.

On 27 February 2025, it was reported that Hirsch would not be returning to AEW/ROH upon her contract expiring, ending her tenure with both promotions.

== Personal life ==
Hirsch is openly a lesbian; she announced her engagement to her partner Jordan Haykin on October 15, 2023. The two married on February 28, 2025.

On March 10, 2022, shortly after the beginning of the Russian invasion of Ukraine, Hirsch issued a statement on social media supporting Ukraine and calling Russian President Vladimir Putin a "brutal dictator" in response to criticism of her ring gear in the national colors of Russia.

== Other media ==
Hirsch, along with other CZW wrestlers, appeared in the music video "If I Ever See You Again" by the American rock band Grayscale.

== Championships and accomplishments ==
- Black Label Pro
  - BLP Arbo's Cheese Dip Big Cheese Championship (1 time, current)
- Pro Wrestling Illustrated
  - Ranked No. 61 of the top 150 female singles wrestlers in the PWI Women's 100 in 2021
  - Ranked No. 473 of the top 500 singles wrestlers in the PWI 500 in 2020
