= Stardom Cinderella Tournament 2018 =

2019 World Wonder Ring Stardom event

- Promotional poster of the event featuring various Stardom wrestlers
- Promotion: World Wonder Ring Stardom
- Date: April 30, 2018 (aired May 5, 2018)
- City: Tokyo, Japan
- Venue: Korakuen Hall
- Attendance: 987

Event chronology
← Previous; Stardom Dream Slam In Nagoya	Next → Stardom Gold Star

Cinderella Tournament chronology
← Previous; 2017	Next → 2019

The 2018 Stardom Cinderella Tournament (スターダムシンデレラトーナメント2018, Sutādamushindereratōnamento 2019) was the fourth annual professional wrestling single-elimination tournament under the Cinderella Tournament branch of events promoted by World Wonder Ring Stardom in Tokyo, Japan. The event took place on April 30, 2018.

== Storylines ==
The show featured fourteen Cinderella Tournament matches and a dark match with scripted storylines, where wrestlers portray villains, heroes, or less distinguishable characters in the scripted events that built tension and culminate in a wrestling match or series of matches. The matches can be won by pinfall, submission or elimination over the top rope. A time-limit draw or a double elimination means a loss for each competitor.

=== Event ===
The preshow included a dark match in which Hanan, the High Speed Champion Mary Apache, Nao Yamaguchi, Natsumi and the Future of Stardom Champion Starlight Kid defeated AZM, Leo Onozaki, Natsuko Tora, Ruaka and Shiki Shibusawa as a result of a ten-woman tag team match. The Cinderella tournament had one draw between Io Shirai and Mayu Iwatani who went on a 10-minute time limit draw in the semifinal, feature which handed both Momo Watanabe and Bea Priestley walkover victories straight to the finals. Watanabe succeeded in winning the tournament with her granted wish being a match for the Wonder of Stardom Championship against the then-time champion Io Shirai.

== Participants ==
The tournament was composed by 16 competitors including the champions. It was an event to conclude in a single day.

*Noted underneath were the champions who held their titles at the time of the tournament.

Wrestler	Unit	Notes
Bea Priestley	Queen's Quest	
Brandi Rhodes	Unaffiliated	
Candy Floss	Unaffiliated	
Chardonnay	Queen's Quest	
Jungle Kyona	Team Jungle	Artist of Stardom Champion
Kagetsu	Oedo Tai	Goddesses of Stardom Champion
Konami	Queen's Quest	
Hana Kimura	Oedo Tai	Goddesses of Stardom Champion
Hazuki	Oedo Tai	
Io Shirai	Queen's Quest	Wonder of Stardom Champion
Martina	Oedo Tai	
Mayu Iwatani	Stars	
Momo Watanabe	Queen's Quest	Winner
Saki Kashima	Stars	
Sumire Natsu	Oedo Tai	
Tam Nakano	Stars	

== Brackets ==
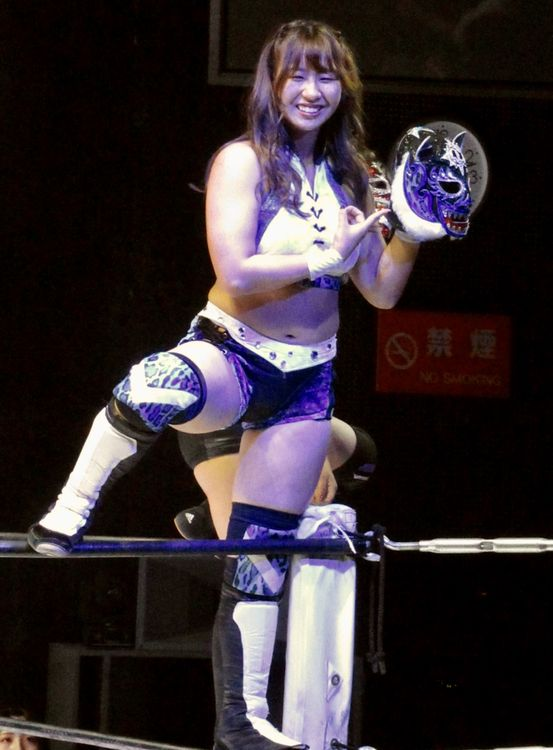
Winner of the 2018 Cinderella Tournament, Momo Watanabe.

Round 1
Io Shirai	Pin
Chardonnay	5:18
Sumire Natsu	3:59
Brandi Rhodes	Pin
Mayu Iwatani	Pin
Tam Nakano	5:26
Candy Floss	4:12
Saki Kashima	Pin
Momo Watanabe	Pin
Konami	3:58
Kagetsu	5:53
Jungle Kyona	Pin
Hazuki	Pin
Hana Kimura	4:47
Martina	4:47
Bea Priestley	Pin

Quarterfinals
Io Shirai	Pin
Brandi Rhodes	5:17
Mayu Iwatani	Pin
Saki Kashima	4:40
Momo Watanabe	Pin
Jungle Kyona	5:05
Hazuki	3:17
Bea Priestley	Pin

Semifinals
Io Shirai	10:00
Mayu Iwatani	Draw (Note: Shirai and Iwatani went into a time-limit draw, therefore both getting disqualified from the tournament.)
Momo Watanabe	Bye (Note: Watanabe and Priestley were scheduled to face in the semifinals but since Shirai and Iwatani were out of the tournament, the match was moved directly to the finals.)
Bea Priestley

Final
Momo Watanabe	Pin
Bea Priestley	6:59
