= Stardom Cinderella Tournament =

World Wonder Ring Stardom tournament

- Promotions: World Wonder Ring Stardom
- First event: 2015
- Signature matches: Time-limited singles matches

Stardom Cinderella Tournament (スターダムシンデレラトーナメント, Sutādamushindereratōnamento) is an annual single-elimination tournament created and promoted by the Japanese professional wrestling promotion World Wonder Ring Stardom. The event has been held since 2015 and aired domestically on Tokyo MX, Fighting TV Samurai and Nippon TV, and later as an internet pay-per-view on Stardom's streaming service Stardom World.

The main gimmick of the tournament is that the winner is being granted a wish, which usually turns up to be a championship match of their choice. Just as the real life fairytale of Cinderella depicting a girl who achieves fame after being obscure, the winner of the tournament transits from "neglected" to "famous", eventually moving up to a championship scene.

== Events ==
As of 2026, there have been a total of twelve events. The first was presented under the name Cinderella Champions Fiesta, later becoming known simply as the Cinderella Tournament. Until 2021, the event used to be a one-day pay-per-view but later switched to a multi-day event.

No.	Event	Date	City	Venue	Attendance	Ref(s)
1	Stardom Ryogoku Cinderella Champions Fiesta 2015	April 23, 2015	Tokyo, Japan	Korakuen Hall	925	
2	Stardom Cinderella Tournament 2016	April 29, 2016	Tokyo, Japan	Korakuen Hall	1,050	
3	Stardom Cinderella Tournament 2017	April 30, 2017	Tokyo, Japan	Korakuen Hall	1,150	
4	Stardom Cinderella Tournament 2018	April 30, 2018	Tokyo, Japan	Korakuen Hall	987	
5	Stardom Cinderella Tournament 2019	April 29, 2019	Tokyo, Japan	Korakuen Hall	1,050	
6	Stardom Cinderella Tournament 2020	March 24, 2020	Tokyo, Japan	Korakuen Hall	538	
7	Stardom Cinderella Tournament 2021	April 10 – June 12, 2021	Various	Various	Highest: Night 3 – 1,240	
8	Stardom Cinderella Tournament 2022	April 3 – 29, 2022	Various	Various	Highest: Night 4 – 2,017	
9	Stardom Cinderella Tournament 2023	March 26 – April 15, 2023	Various	Various	Highest: Night 3 – 1,295	
10	Stardom Cinderella Tournament 2024	March 9 – 20, 2024	Various	Various	Highest: Night 1 – 1,555	
11	Stardom Cinderella Tournament 2025	March 8 – 15, 2025	Various	Various	Highest: Night 3 – 1,378	
12	Stardom Cinderella Tournament 2026	March 6 – 15, 2026	Various	Various	Highest: Night 5 – 1,857	

== Stats ==
=== List of winners ===
Year	Tournament				Aftermath			
Year	Winner	Runner-up	Times won	No. of entrants	Challenged for	Match	Result	Ref
2015	Mayu Iwatani	Koguma	1	14	World of Stardom Championship	vs. Kairi Hojo at Stardom Gold May 2015	Lost	
2016	Mayu Iwatani	Hiroyo Matsumoto	2	16	World of Stardom Championship	vs. Io Shirai at Stardom Gold May 2016	Lost	
2017	Toni Storm	Mayu Iwatani	1	16	World of Stardom Championship	vs. Io Shirai at Stardom Gold May 2017	Lost	
2018	Momo Watanabe	Bea Priestley	1	16	Wonder of Stardom Championship	vs. Io Shirai at Stardom Gold Star	Won	
2019	Arisa Hoshiki	Konami	1	16	Wonder of Stardom Championship	vs. Momo Watanabe at Stardom Gold May 2019	Won	
2020	Giulia	Natsuko Tora	1	16	Wonder of Stardom Championship	vs. Tam Nakano at Cinderella Summer in Tokyo	Won	
2021	Saya Kamitani	Maika	1	20	Wonder of Stardom Championship	vs. Tam Nakano at Yokohama Dream Cinderella 2021 in Summer	Lost	
2022	Mirai	Koguma	1	31	Wonder of Stardom Championship	vs. Saya Kamitani at Stardom Flashing Champions	Lost	
2023	Mirai	Mai Sakurai	2	36	Wonder of Stardom Championship	vs. Tam Nakano at Stardom Mid Summer Champions 2023	Won	
2024	Hanan	Ami Sohrei	1	24	Wonder of Stardom Championship	vs. Saori Anou at Stardom All Star Grand Queendom 2024	Lost	
2025	Sayaka Kurara	Rina	1	16	World of Stardom Championship	vs. Saya Kamitani at Stardom Nighter In Korakuen	Lost	
2026	Hanan	Rina	2	32	Wonder of Stardom Championship	vs. Konami at Stardom All Star Grand Queendom 2026	Won	

=== Record ===
Championship	Successful challenges	Attempts	Success rate
World of Stardom Championship	0	4	.000
Wonder of Stardom Championship	5	8	.385

=== All-time participants list ===
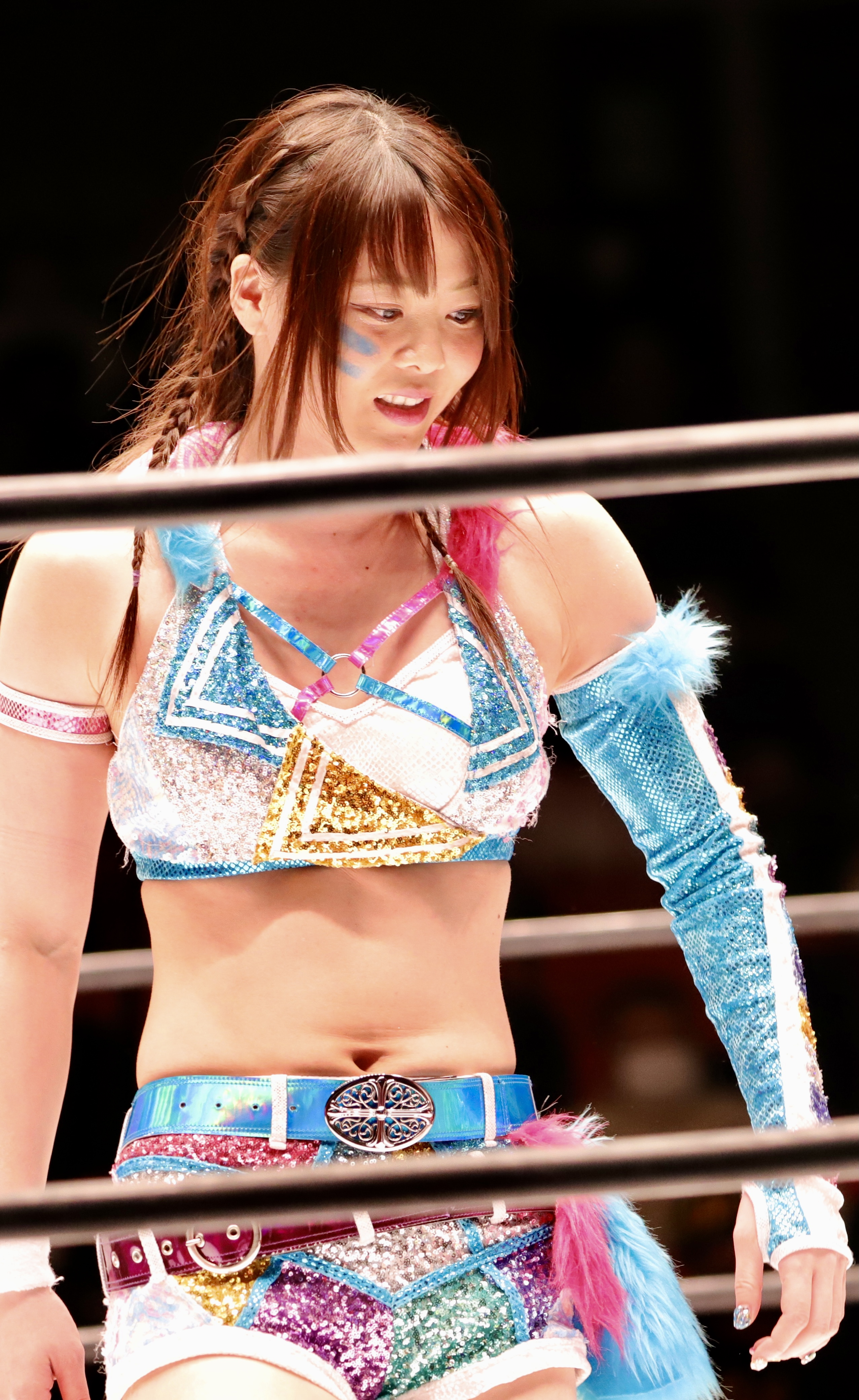
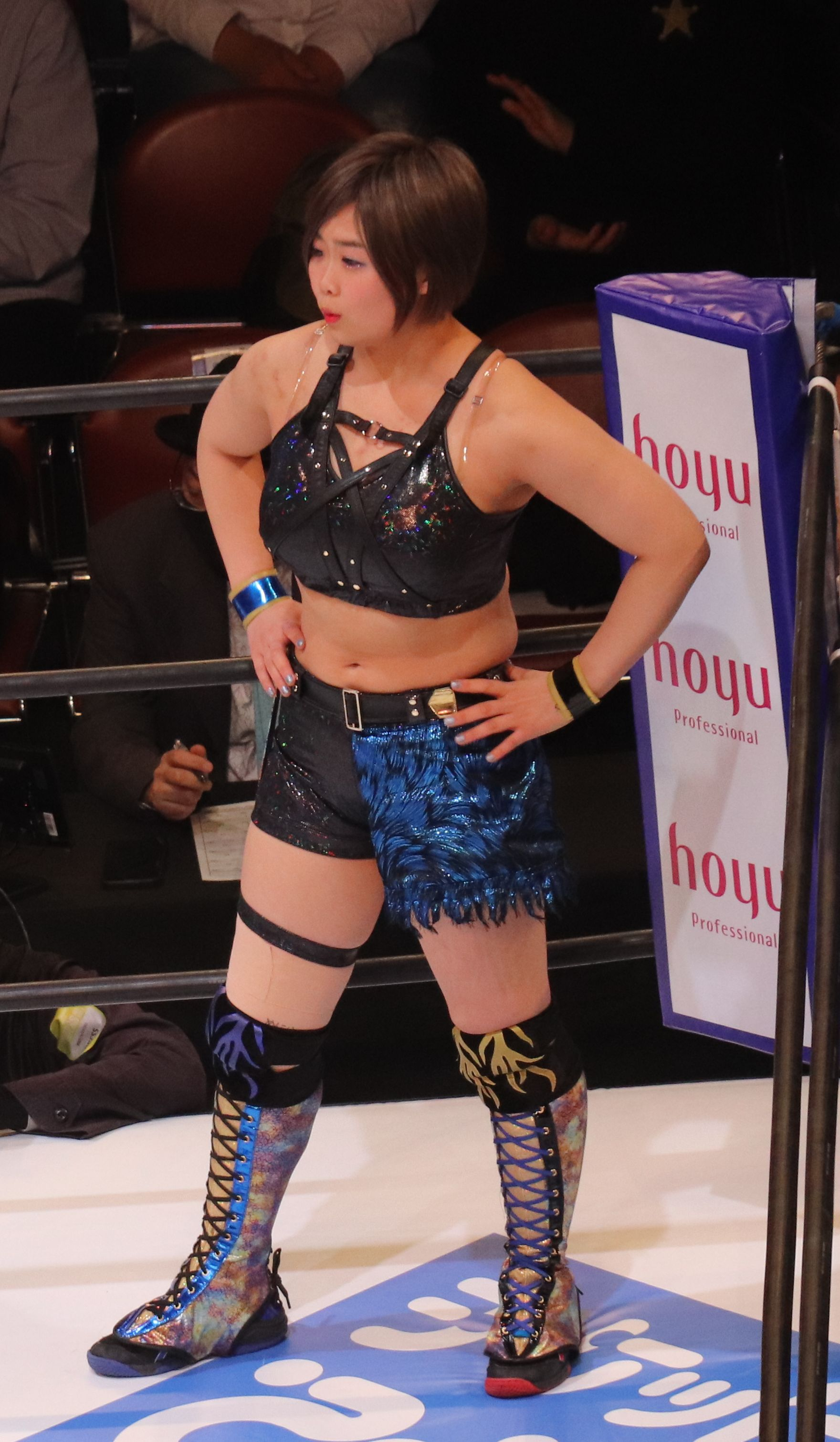
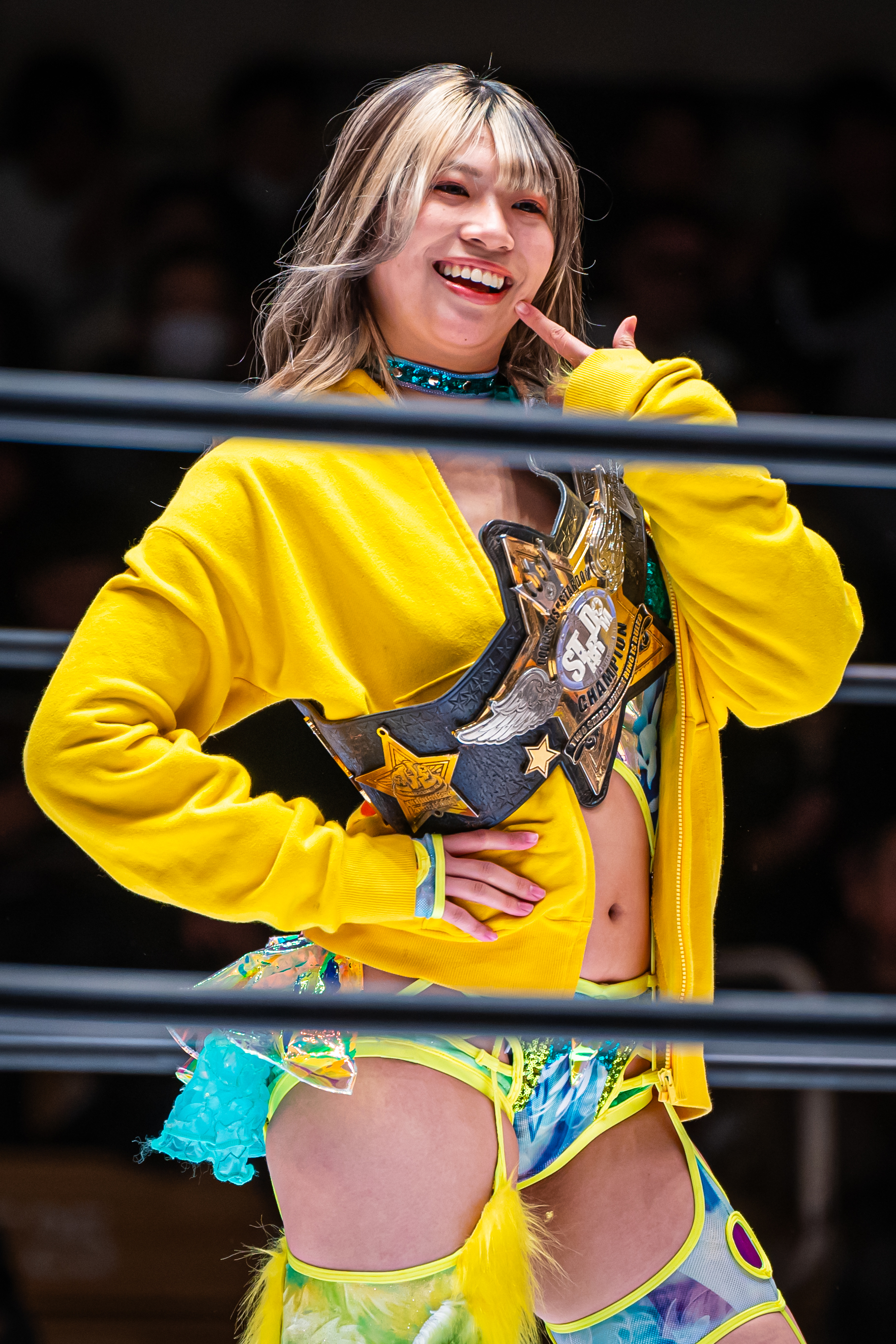
Record two-time Cinderella Tournament winners, from left to right: Mayu Iwatani, Mirai, and Hanan

As of the 2026 edition, the tournament has featured a total of 91 participants. Mayu Iwatani, Mirai, and Hanan are the only wrestlers to win the competition on two separate occasions (with Iwatani and Mirai being the only two to win on consecutive occasions). Iwatani shares the record for the most appearances with Momo Watanabe at 8. Koguma and Rina are the only competitors to be two-time runner ups. Mayu Iwatani, Giulia, Toni Storm and Hanan won the tournament while holding other titles, respective the Artist of Stardom Championship (Giulia), the SWA World Championship (Storm), the Goddesses of Stardom Championship (Iwatani) and the New Blood Tag Team Championship (Hanan).

==== Legend ====
- W – Winner
- F – Finals
- SF – Semi-finals
- QF – Quarter-finals
- R2 – Round 2
- R1 – Round 1
- ‡ – Deceased

Wrestler	Victories	Apps	Best result
Mayu Iwatani	2	8	W
Hanan	2	6	W
Mirai	2	3	W
Momo Watanabe	1	8	W
Giulia	1	4	W
Saya Kamitani	1	4	W
Sayaka Kurara	1	3	W
Arisa Hoshiki	1	1	W
Toni Storm	1	1	W
Natsuko Tora	0	6	F
AZM	0	6	SF
Tam Nakano	0	6	SF
Saki Kashima	0	7^{(8)} (Note: At the 2021 edition of the tournament, Kashima was not able to make it to the show and had Rina replacing her.)	QF
Starlight Kid	0	6	QF
Konami	0	5	F
Hazuki/HZK	0	5	SF
Ruaka	0	5	SF
Jungle Kyona	0	5	R2
Kaori Yoneyama/Fukigen Death	0	5	R1
Lady C	0	5	R1
Koguma	0	4	F
Maika	0	4	F
Rina	0	4	F
Miyu Amasaki	0	4	SF
Natsupoi	0	4	SF
Syuri	0	4	SF
Waka Tsukiyama	0	4	SF
Hina	0	4	QF
Saya Iida	0	4	QF
Hana Kimura ‡	0	4	R2
Kagetsu	0	4	R2
Utami Hayashishita	0	4	R2
Momo Kohgo	0	4	R1
Mai Sakurai	0	3	F
Ami Sourei	0	3	F
Aya Sakura	0	3	SF
Himeka	0	3	SF
Kairi Hojo	0	3	QF
Xena	0	3	QF
Ranna Yagami	0	3	R2
Tomoka Inaba	0	3	R2
Yuna Mizumori	0	3	R2
Hanako	0	3	R1
Mina Shirakawa	0	3	R1
Azusa Inaba	0	2	SF
Bea Priestley	0	2	QF
Miyu Amasaki	0	2	QF
Rian	0	2	QF
Unagi Sayaka	0	2	QF
Io Shirai	0	2	R2
Kyoko Kimura	0	2	R2
Thekla	0	2	R2
Akira Kurogane	0	2	R1
Hiromi Mimura	0	2	R1
Kris Wolf	0	2	R1
Saori Anou	0	2	R1
Sumire Natsu	0	2	R1
Tabata	0	2	R1
Yuria Hime	0	2	R1
Hiroyo Matsumoto	0	1	SF
Maki Itoh	0	1	QF
Brandi Rhodes	0	1	R2
Chelsea	0	1	R2
Jessicka Havok	0	1	R2
Mariah May	0	1	R2
Queen Maya	0	1	R2
Santana Garrett	0	1	R2
Star Fire	0	1	R2
Tessa Blanchard	0	1	R2
Alex Lee	0	1	R1
Alpha Female	0	1	R1
Anne Kanaya	0	1	R1
Andras Miyagi	0	1	R1
Candy Floss	0	1	R1
Chardonnay	0	1	R1
Diosa Atenea	0	1	R1
Fuwa-chan	0	1	R1
Haruka Kato	0	1	R1
Haruka Umesaki	0	1	R1
Hatsuhinode Kamen	0	1	R1
Hetzza	0	1	R1
Jamie Hayter	0	1	R1
Kikyo Furusawa	0	1	R1
Kiyoka Kotatsu	0	1	R1
Nanae Takahashi	0	1	R1
Rebel	0	1	R1
Rebel Kel	0	1	R1
Rina Yamashita	0	1	R1
Martina	0	1	R1
Thunder Rosa	0	1	R1
Yuzuki	0	1	R1
