= Stardom Cinderella Tournament 2019 =

2019 World Wonder Ring Stardom event

- Promotional poster of the event featuring various Stardom wrestlers
- Promotion: World Wonder Ring Stardom
- Date: April 29, 2019
- City: Tokyo, Japan
- Venue: Korakuen Hall
- Attendance: 1,050

Event chronology
← Previous; Stardom American Dream In The Big Apple	Next → Stardom Gold May 2019

Cinderella Tournament chronology
← Previous; 2018	Next → 2020

The 2019 Stardom Cinderella Tournament (スターダムシンデレラトーナメント2019, Sutādamushindereratōnamento 2019) was the fifth annual professional wrestling single-elimination tournament under the Cinderella Tournament branch of events promoted by World Wonder Ring Stardom in Tokyo, Japan. The event took place on April 29, 2019.

== Storylines ==
The show featured fourteen Cinderella Tournament matches and a dark match with scripted storylines, where wrestlers portray villains, heroes, or less distinguishable characters in the scripted events that built tension and culminate in a wrestling match or series of matches. The matches can be won by pinfall, submission or elimination over the top rope. A time-limit draw or a double elimination means a loss for each competitor.

=== Event ===
The preshow included a dark match in which Hanan and Saya Iida defeated Hina and Leo Onozaki, and Rina and Ruaka in a three-way tag team match. The Cinderella Tournament had one draw between Kagetsu and Nakano who went into the 10-minute time limit which handed Arisa Hoshiki a walkover victory straight to the semi-finals. Hoshiki succeeded in winning the tournament with her granted wish being a match for the Wonder of Stardom Championship against the then-time champion Momo Watanabe. Hoshiki won the "white belt" at Stardom Gold 2019 on May 16.

== Participants ==
The tournament was composed by 16 competitors including the champions. It was the last event to conclude in a single day.

*Noted underneath were the champions who held their titles at the time of the tournament.

Wrestler	Unit	Notes
Andras Miyagi	Oedo Tai	
Arisa Hoshiki	Stars	Winner
AZM	Queen's Quest	
Bea Priestley	Queen's Quest	
Hana Kimura	Tokyo Cyber Squad	
HZK	Oedo Tai	High Speed Champion
Jungle Kyona	Tokyo Cyber Squad	
Kagetsu	Oedo Tai	World of Stardom Champion
Konami	Tokyo Cyber Squad	
Momo Watanabe	Queen's Quest	Goddesses of Stardom Champion; Wonder of Stardom Champion
Natsu Sumire	Oedo Tai	
Natsuko Tora	Oedo Tai	
Rebel Kel	Tokyo Cyber Squad	
Saki Kashima	Stars	Artist of Stardom Champion
Starlight Kid	Stars	
Tam Nakano	Stars	Artist of Stardom Champion

== Brackets ==
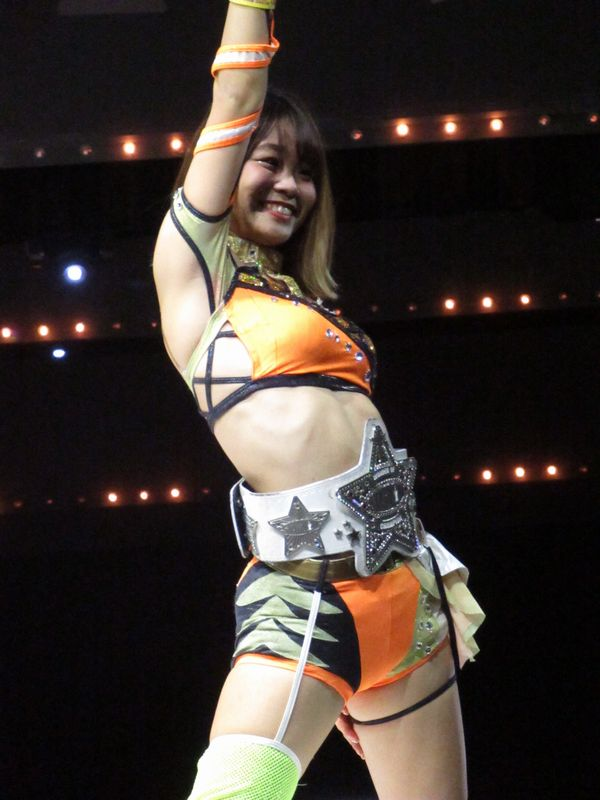
Winner of the 2019 Cinderella Tournament, Arisa Hoshiki.

Round 1
Rebel Kel	Pin
AZM	5:00
Konami	Pin
Momo Watanabe	4:57
Natsu Sumire	5:16
Starlight Kid	Pin
HZK	Pin
Bea Priestley	4:01
Andras Miyagi	6:44
Hana Kimura	Pin
Natsuko Tora	Pin
Jungle Kyona	7:55
Saki Kashima	5:01
Arisa Hoshiki	Pin
Kagetsu	Draw (Note: Kagetsu and Nakano went into a time-limit draw, therefore both getting disqualified from the tournament.)
Tam Nakano	10:00

Quarterfinals
AZM	3:34
Konami	Pin
Starlight Kid	Pin
HZK	1:19
Hana Kimura	7:00
Natsuko Tora	Pin
Arisa Hoshiki	N/A
Bye	-

Semifinals
Konami	Pin
Starlight Kid	2:46
Natsuko Tora	5:50
Arisa Hoshiki	Pin

Final
Konami	10:21
Arisa Hoshiki	Pin
