= Arisa Hoshiki =

Japanese professional wrestler

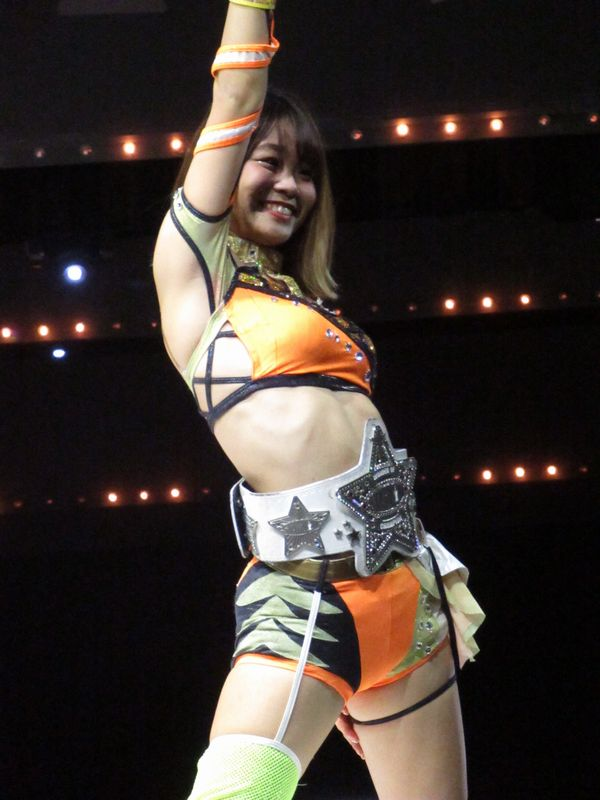
- Hoshiki in 2019

Personal information
- Born: October 13, 1995 (age 30) Funabashi, Chiba, Japan

Professional wrestling career
- Ring name: Arisa Hoshiki
- Billed height: 5 ft 6 in (1.68 m)
- Billed weight: 52 kg (115 lb)
- Billed from: Funabashi, Chiba, Japan
- Trained by: Fuka
- Debut: January 23, 2011
- Retired: May 20, 2020

Arisa Hoshiki (星輝ありさ, Hoshiki Arisa; born October 13, 1995) is a Japanese singer, songwriter, retired professional wrestler, and former shoot boxer. In professional wrestling, she worked in the World Wonder Ring Stardom promotion, where she was Wonder of Stardom Champion, the promotion's secondary title. She vacated the championship on May 20, 2020, after she retired due to injury. Since 2018, Hoshiki had performed in the band Unlimited Dream Navigator, under the name Udon Sato (うどん佐藤), as part of which she performed her wrestling theme song. The band disbanded in 2021.

== Professional wrestling career ==
=== World Wonder Ring Stardom (2011–2012) ===
Hoshiki made her in-ring debut at World Wonder Ring Stardom on January 23, 2011, where she defeated Mayu Iwatani. She was 15 years old at the time. Hoshiki and Iwatani would later team together and wrestle under the name AMA. During her time in Stardom, Hoshiki made it to the finals of Rookie of the Year tournament in 2011 where she lost to Yoshiko, and unsuccessfully challenged Yuzuki Aikawa for the Wonder of Stardom Championship in her first title match. Hoshiki wrestled her last match on May 20, 2012, against Yuhi which ended with a time limit draw. Later on, Fuka announced that Arisa would be leaving Stardom, which afterwards got confirmed by Arisa on her blog.

=== Return to Stardom and wrestling (2018–2020) ===
Hoshiki made her return to wrestling, when she returned to Stardom on November 23, 2018, teaming with Mayu Iwatani against AZM and Konami of Queen's Quest in a winning effort, scoring the pin on AZM. Hoshiki was then invited into Iwatani's Stars unit that same day.

On February 17, 2019, AMA unsuccessfully challenged Momo Watanabe and Utami Hayashishita for the Goddesses Of Stardom Championships.

On April 29, 2019, Hoshiki won the Cinderella Tournament, and challenged Momo Watanabe for the Wonder of Stardom Championship, also announcing that she signed with Stardom on a full-time basis. On May 16, she defeated Watanabe to win the first ever championship in her professional wrestling career. Her first defense came a month after on June 16, 2019, at Stardom's Shining Destiny event, defeating her rival & partner, Tam Nakano. Her second defense came later that month, in London, England, at Pro Wrestling: EVE's Wrestle Queendom 2 event, defeating Roxxy. Afterwards, she went on to defeat Hazuki, Jungle Kyona, Avary, Kagetsu, Jamie Hayter and Konami before having to vacate the championship.

On November 15, 2019, Nakano and Hoshiki, also known as DREAM☆SHiNE, defeated Bea Priestley and Jamie Hayter in the final of Stardom's Goddesses of Stardom Tag League, winning the tournament. Afterwards, on November 24, 2019, they unsuccessfully challenged Konami and Jungle Kyona for the Goddesses Of Stardom Championships.

On May 20, 2020, Arisa announced her retirement from professional wrestling due to head and neck injuries, therefore vacating the Wonder of Stardom Championship ending her reign at 370 days with 10 defenses. This makes her the 3rd longest reigning Wonder Of Stardom champion in history, behind first ever champion Yuzuki Aikawa & 16th champion Saya Kamitani, and has the 3rd most defenses in the title's history, tied with Io Shirai.

== Music career ==
Arisa also had her own band called Unlimited Dream Navigator, in which she performed under the name Udon Sato. The band released two albums being World Peace and The Contrast of Static And Dynamic and also produced her wrestling theme song, "SHiNiNG STAR". She has named her favorite artists as being UVERworld, miwa, Acid Black Cherry, Dir En Grey and LiSA. Arisa also uploaded vocal covers to YouTube, including covers of LiSA. Unlimited Dream Navigator disbanded in 2021, with Arisa going solo. On November 20, 2021, Arisa announced an indefinite hiatus from all activities, including music, therefore she has not released any new music as of November 2022.

== Acting career ==
Hoshiki made her acting debut in 2021, working together with the Action Ring Girl'Z division of Actwres girl'Z. She played the role of Arisa Hoshiki (星希アリサ) in a wrestling based show. Hoshiki had to withdraw from any Action Ring Girl'Z activities due to poor physical condition, and has not returned to acting since she is on an indefinite hiatus from all activities.

== Championships and accomplishment ==
- Pro Wrestling Illustrated
  - Ranked No. 28 of the top 100 female singles wrestlers in the PWI Women's 100 in 2019
- World Wonder Ring Stardom
  - Wonder of Stardom Championship (1 time)
  - Cinderella Tournament (2019)
  - Goddesses of Stardom Tag League (2019) – with Tam Nakano
  - Stardom Year-End Award (2 times)
    - Best Match Award (2019) vs. Tam Nakano on June 16
    - Outstanding Performance Award (2019)

== Shoot boxing record ==
Arisa Hoshiki Shoot boxing record
1 win, 1 loss
Date	Result	Opponent	Event	Location	Method	Round	Time
2014-11-30	Loss	(Japan) Akari Nakamura	Shoot Boxing S-Cup World Tournament 2014	Tokyo, Japan	Decision (unanimous)	3	3:00
2014-08-02	Win	(Japan) Maki Goto	Shoot Boxing Girls S-Cup 2014	Tokyo, Japan	TKO (Punch consecutive hits)	2	0:53
Legend: Win Loss
