= Stardom Year-End Awards =

Professional wrestling award

- Country: Japan
- Presented by: World Wonder Ring Stardom
- First award: December 25, 2011; 14 years ago

The Stardom Year-End Awards is a concept used by World Wonder Ring Stardom where awards, similar to the Academy and Grammy Awards, are given to professional wrestlers at the end of the year who have performed in Stardom. The first award ceremony took place on December 25, 2011.

== Active awards ==
=== Best Match Award ===
This award was originally named the Best Bout Award, from 2011 to 2012.

Year	Date	Match	Event	Location	Notes
2011	November 12	Nanae Takahashi vs. Natsuki☆Taiyo	Goddesses of Stardom Tag League - Day 3	Tokyo	For the World of Stardom Championship
2012	September 17	Nanae Takahashi vs. Yuzuki Aikawa	5★Star Grand Prix - Day 4	Tokyo	
2012	December 24	Nanae Takahashi vs. Yuzuki Aikawa	Year-End Climax	Tokyo	For the World of Stardom Championship
2013	April 29	Yoshiko vs. Yuzuki Aikawa	Ryogoku Cinderella Champions Fiesta	Tokyo	
2014	December 23	Kairi Hojo and Nanae Takahashi vs. Risa Sera and Takumi Iroha	Year-End Climax	Tokyo	For the Goddesses of Stardom Championship
2015	December 23	Io Shirai vs. Meiko Satomura	Year-End Climax	Tokyo	For the World of Stardom Championship
2016	December 22	Io Shirai vs. Mayu Iwatani	Year-End Climax	Tokyo	For the World of Stardom Championship
2017	October 17	Takumi Iroha vs. Yoko Bito	True Fight	Tokyo	For the Wonder of Stardom Championship
2018	June 17	Oedo Tai (Hazuki and Kagetsu) vs. Thunder Rock (Io Shirai and Mayu Iwatani)	Goddesses of Destiny	Tokyo	For the Goddesses of Stardom Championship
2019	June 16	Arisa Hoshiki vs. Tam Nakano	Shining Destiny	Tokyo	For the Wonder of Stardom Championship
2020	November 15	Mayu Iwatani vs. Utami Hayashishita	Sendai Cinderella	Sendai	For the World of Stardom Championship
2021	March 3	Giulia vs. Tam Nakano	All Star Dream Cinderella	Tokyo	Hair vs. Hair match for the Wonder of Stardom Championship
2022	December 29	Giulia vs. Syuri	Dream Queendom	Tokyo	For the World of Stardom Championship
2023	December 29	Giulia vs. Megan Bayne	Dream Queendom	Tokyo	For the Strong Women's Championship
2024	November 17	Mayu Iwatani vs. Momo Watanabe	Historic X-Over 2	Osaka	For the IWGP Women's Championship
2025	April 27	Saya Kamitani vs. Tam Nakano	All Star Grand Queendom	Yokohama	Title vs. Career match for the World of Stardom Championship

=== Best Tag Team Award ===
Year	Team
2012	Natsuki☆Taiyo and Yoshiko
2013	Miho Wakizawa and Nanae Takahashi
2014	7Kairi (Kairi Hojo and Nanae Takahashi)
2015	Thunder Rock (Io Shirai and Mayu Iwatani)
2016	BY Ho (Kairi Hojo and Yoko Bito)
2017	Hana Kimura and Kagetsu
2018	Momo Watanabe and Utami Hayashishita
2019	Tokyo Cyber Squad (Jungle Kyona and Konami)
2020	AphroditE (Saya Kamitani and Utami Hayashishita)
2021	FWC (Hazuki and Koguma)
2022	meltear (Tam Nakano and Natsupoi)
2023	REStart (Natsupoi and Saori Anou)
2024	wing★gori (Hanan and Saya Iida)
2025	BMI2000 (Natsuko Tora and Ruaka)

=== Best Technique Award ===
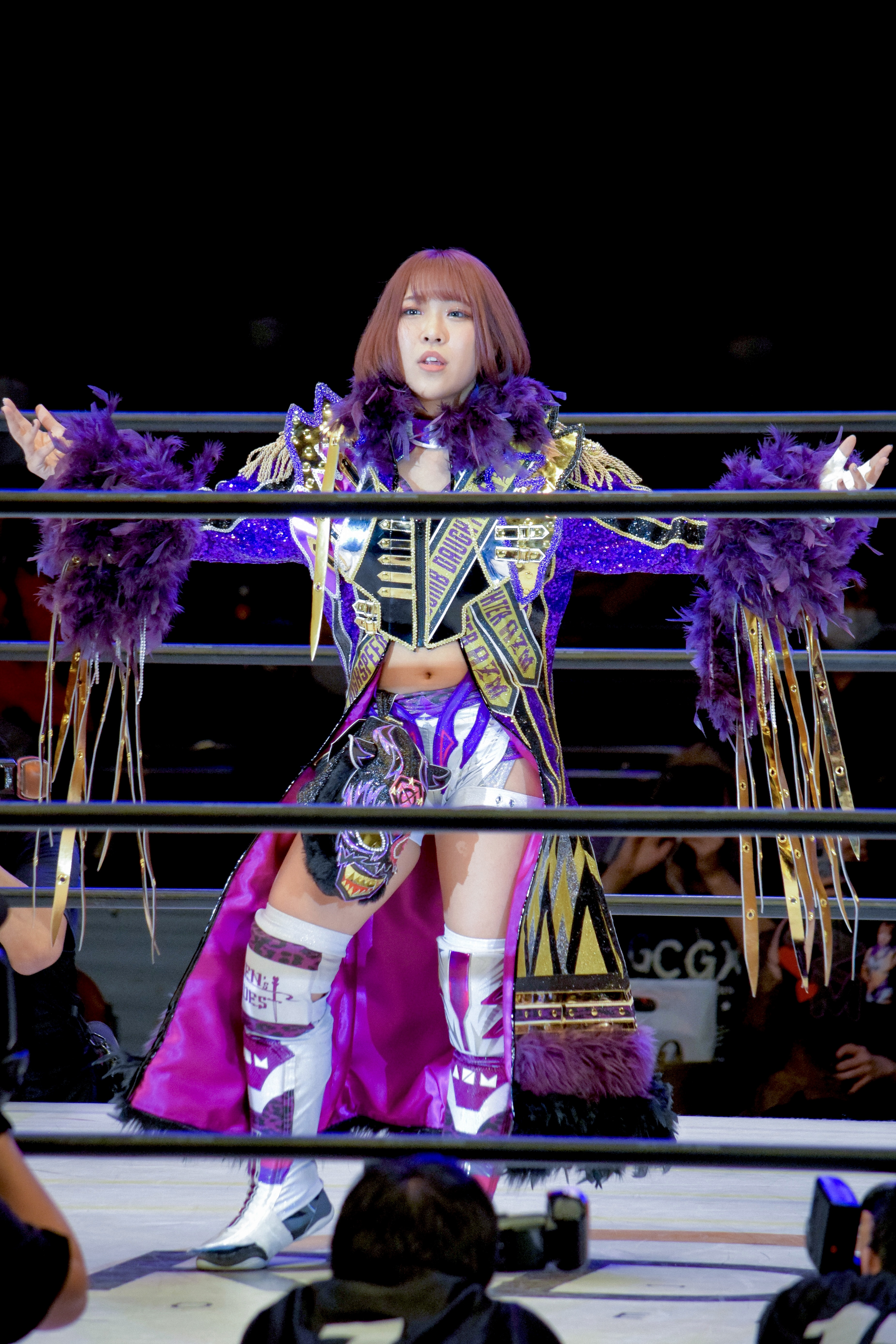
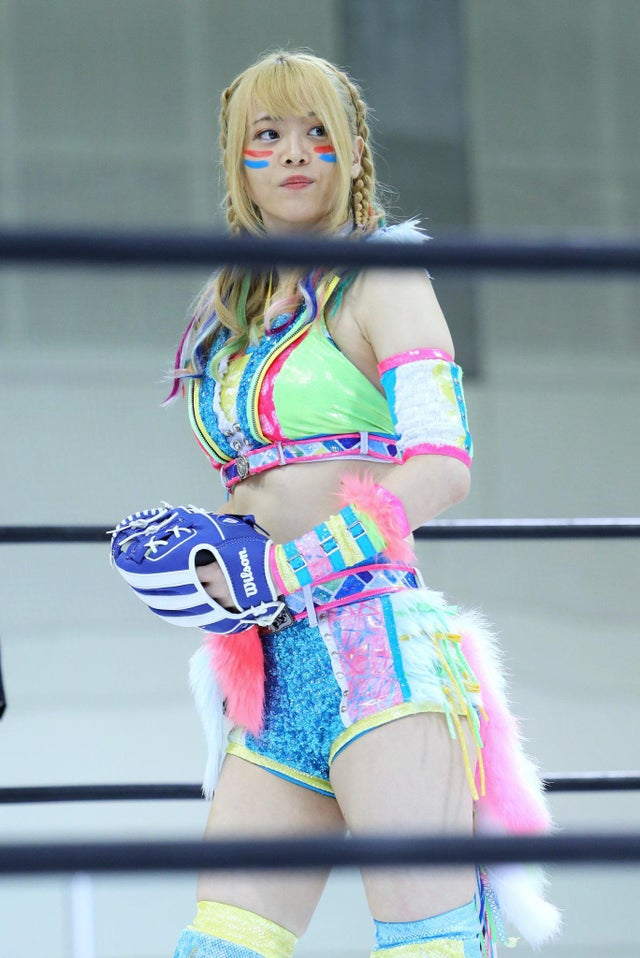
AZM (left) and Mayu Iwatani (right) are two-time winners of the category

Year	Wrestler
2012	Act Yasukawa
2013	Natsuki☆Taiyo
2014	Mayu Iwatani
2015	Mayu Iwatani
2016	Kairi Hojo
2017	Hiromi Mimura
2018	Starlight Kid
2019	AZM
2020	Konami
2021	Saya Kamitani
2022	AZM (2)
2023	Mirai
2024	Mei Seira
2025	Syuri

=== Best Unit Award ===
Year	Unit
2018	Stars
2019	Oedo Tai
2020	Donna Del Mondo (Giulia, Himeka, Maika, Natsupoi and Syuri)
2021	Oedo Tai (2) (Momo Watanabe, Natsuko Tora, Rina, Ruaka, Saki Kashima and Starlight Kid)
2022	Stars (2) (Hanan, Hazuki, Koguma, Mayu Iwatani, Momo Kohgo and Saya Iida)
2023	Queen's Quest (Utami Hayashishita, Saya Kamitani, AZM, Lady C, Miyu Amasaki and Hina)
2024	Cosmic Angels (Tam Nakano, Natsupoi, Saori Anou, Yuna Mizumori, Sayaka Kurara, Aya Sakura)
2025	H.A.T.E (Natsuko Tora, Momo Watanabe, Saya Kamitani, Konami, Ruaka, Rina, Fukigen Death, and Azusa Inaba)

=== Fighting Spirit Award ===
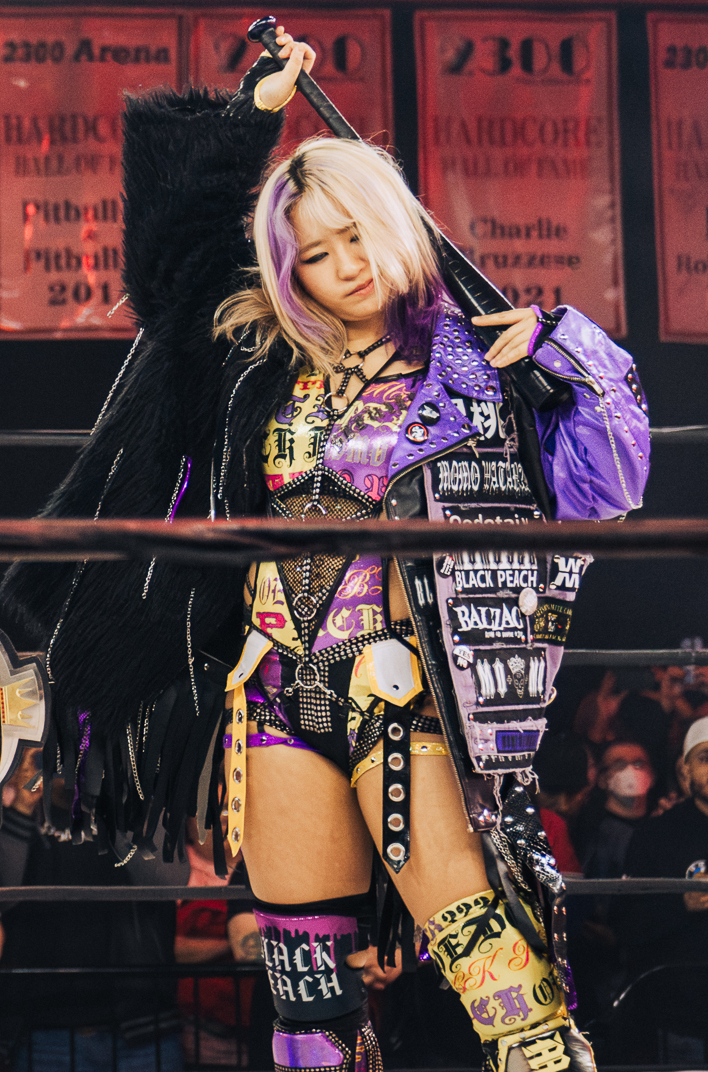
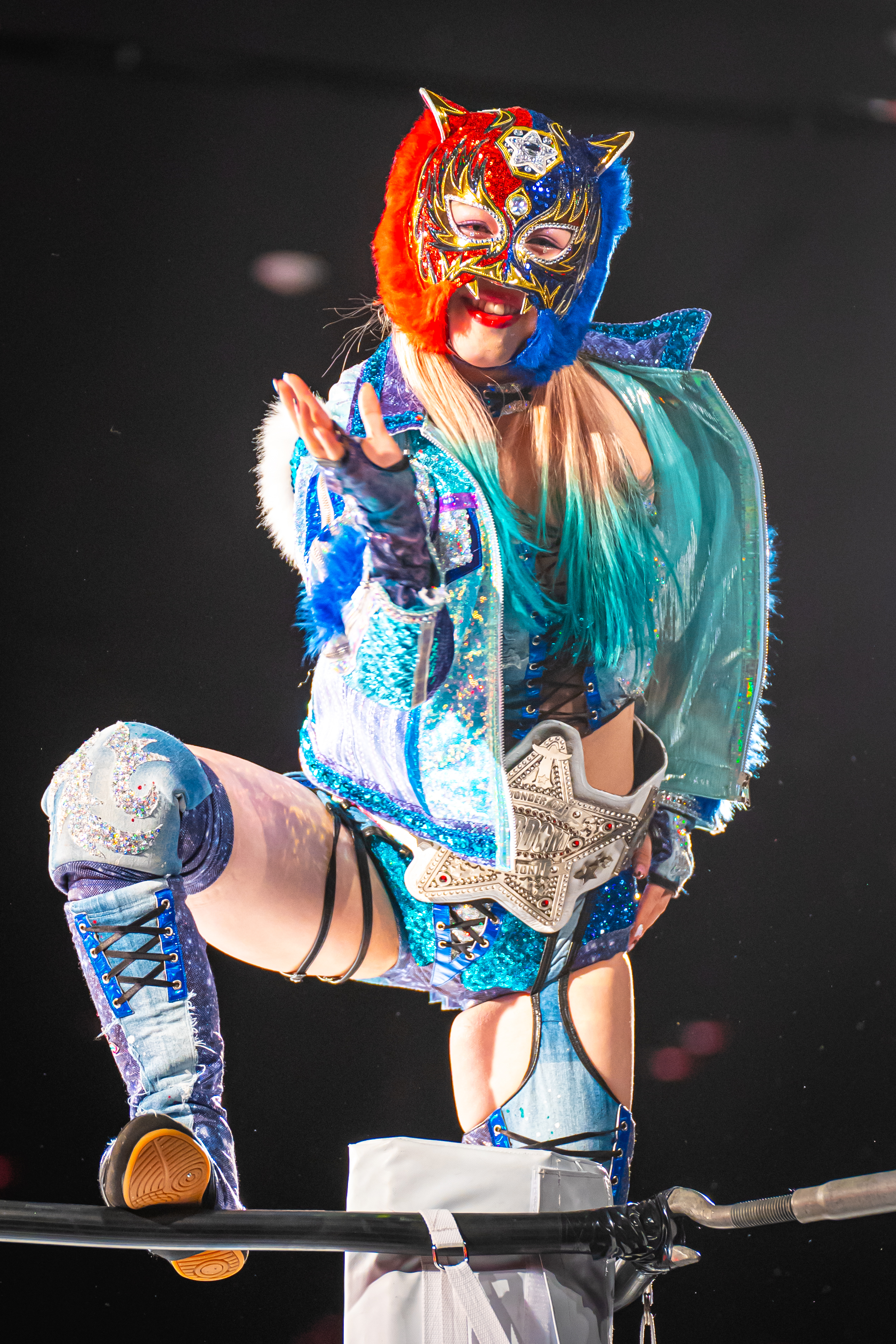
Act Yasukawa (left), Momo Watanabe (right) and Starlight Kid (down) are record two-time winners of the category

The Fighting Spirit Award is given to a wrestler who remained active throughout the year.

Year	Wrestler
2011	Yoshiko
2012	Miho Wakizawa
2013	Act Yasukawa
2014	Koguma
2015	Act Yasukawa (2)
2016	Momo Watanabe
2017	Mayu Iwatani
2018	Natsuko Tora
2019	Hana Kimura
2020	Tam Nakano
2021	Unagi Sayaka
2022	Starlight Kid
2023	Suzu Suzuki
2024	Momo Watanabe (2)
2025	Starlight Kid (2)

=== MVP Award ===
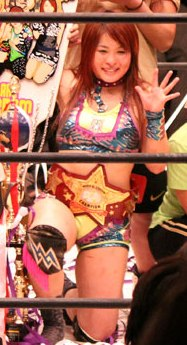
Io Shirai is a three-time winner of the category

The MVP Award is given to a wrestler who shined the most throughout the year.

Year	Wrestler
2011	Yuzuki Aikawa
2012	Nanae Takahashi
2013	Io Shirai
2014	Io Shirai
2015	Kairi Hojo
2016	Io Shirai (3)
2017	Toni Storm
2018	Momo Watanabe
2019	Mayu Iwatani
2020	Giulia
2021	Utami Hayashishita
2022	Syuri
2023	Tam Nakano
2024	Maika
2025	Saya Kamitani

=== Outstanding Performance Award ===
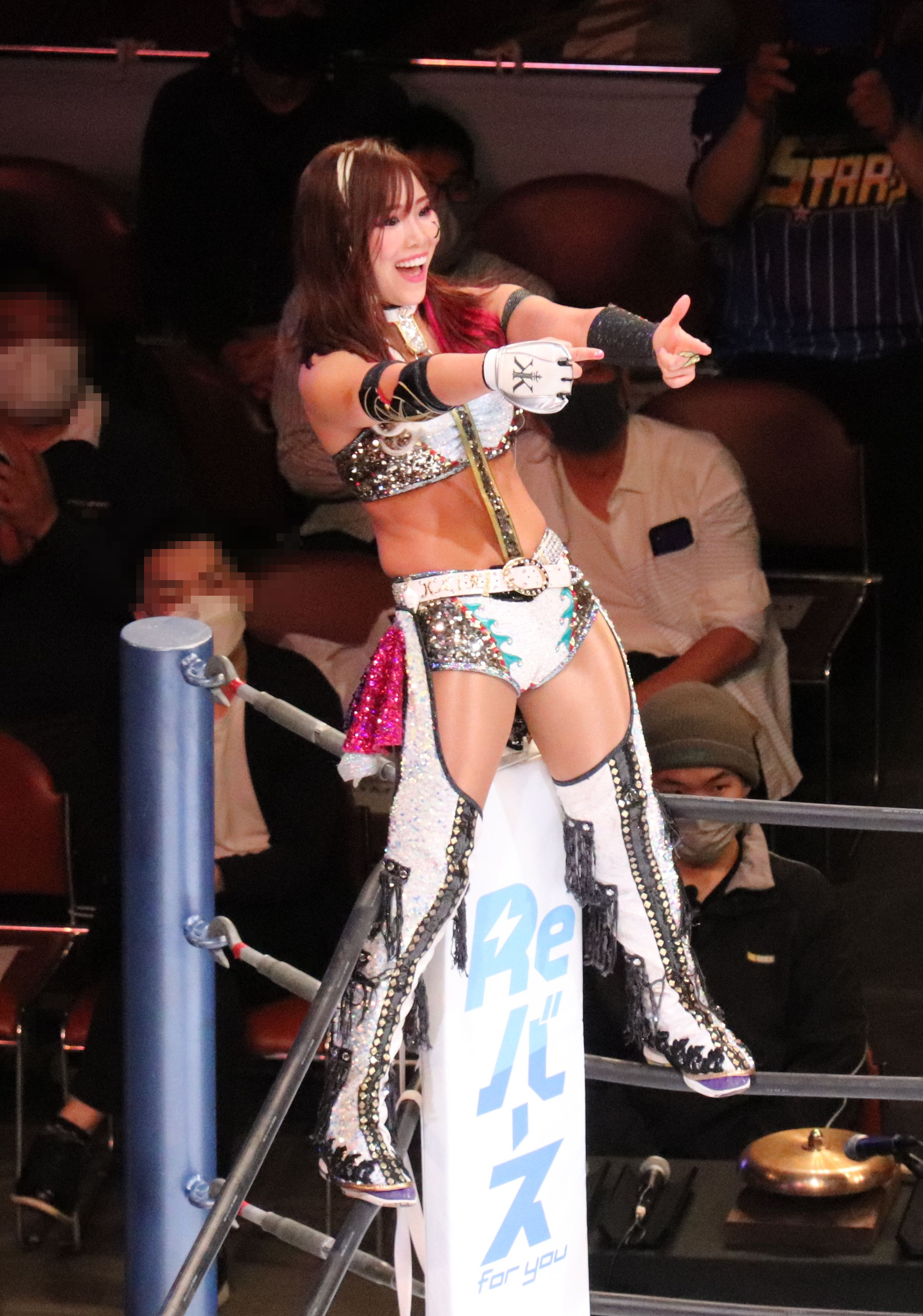
Kairi Hojo is a two-time winner of the category

Year	Wrestler
2011	Yoko Bito
2012	Yuzuki Aikawa
2013	Kairi Hojo
2014	Yoshiko
2015	Kairi Hojo (2)
2016	Yoko Bito (2)
2017	Io Shirai
2018	Utami Hayashishita
2019	Arisa Hoshiki
2020	Bea Priestley
2021	Syuri
2022	Saya Kamitani
2023	Mayu Iwatani
2024	Saori Anou
2025	Saya Iida

=== Shining Award ===
The Shining Award is the only award where the winner is chosen by fan vote.

Year	Wrestler
2020	Giulia
2021	Starlight Kid
2022	Tam Nakano
2023	Maika
2024	Starlight Kid
2025	Saya Kamitani

=== Special Merit Award (特別賞, Tokubetsu-shō) ===
Year	Wrestler
2014	Miho Wakizawa
2021	Mayu Iwatani
2024	Saya Kamitani; Mina Shirakawa
2025	Tam Nakano

== See also ==
- List of professional wrestling awards
- List of Pro Wrestling Illustrated awards
- List of Wrestling Observer Newsletter awards
- Slammy Awards
