= Momo Watanabe =

Japanese professional wrestler (born 2000)

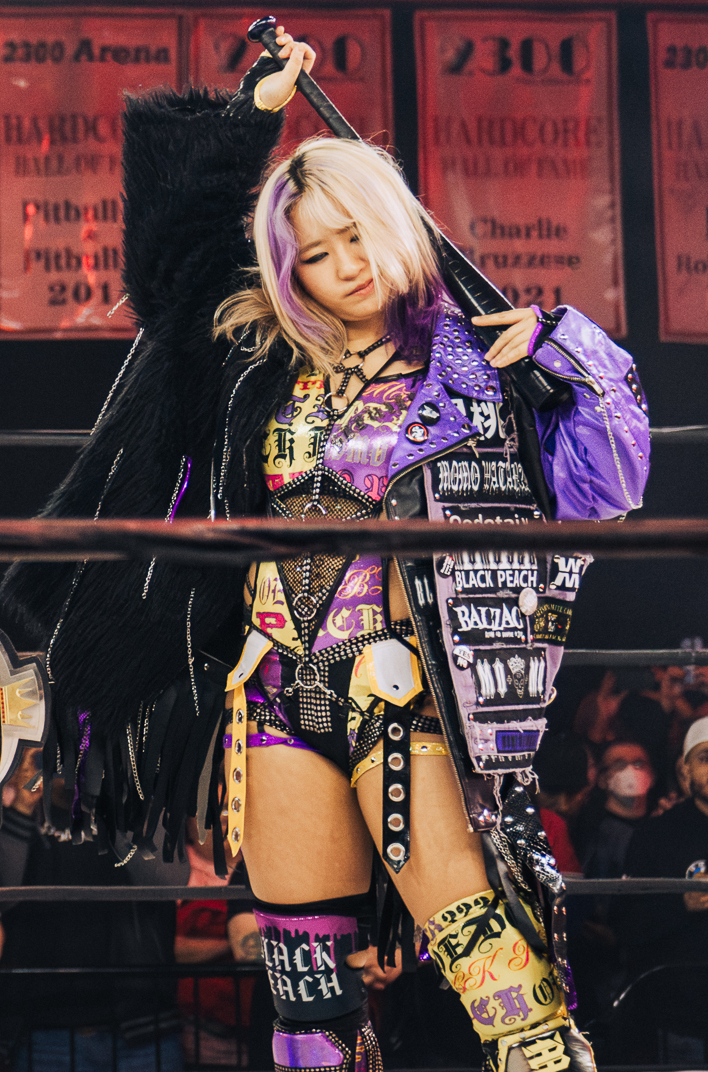
- Watanabe in April 2024

Personal information
- Born: March 22, 2000 (age 26) Sagamihara, Kanagawa, Japan

Professional wrestling career
- Ring names: Black Fuzzy Peach; Fuzzy Peach; Momo Watanabe
- Billed height: 157 cm (5 ft 2 in)
- Billed weight: 60 kg (132 lb)
- Trained by: Fuka
- Debut: November 16, 2014

Momo Watanabe (渡辺桃, Watanabe Momo; born March 22, 2000) is a Japanese professional wrestler. She is signed to World Wonder Ring Stardom, where she is a member of H.A.T.E.

Since Watanabe made her Stardom debut on November 16, 2014, she became a three-time Artist of Stardom Champion, three-time Goddesses of Stardom Champion and one-time Wonder of Stardom Champion. Watanabe is the winner of the 2018 Cinderella Tournament, the 2025 5★Star GP, and the 2018 and 2020 iterations of the Goddesses of Stardom Tag League. Watanabe is also a former leader of Queen's Quest.

== Professional wrestling career ==
=== World Wonder Ring Stardom (2014-present) ===
==== Early career (2014–2016) ====
On November 16, 2014, Watanabe made her professional wrestling debut at World Wonder Ring Stardom where she unsuccessfully challenged Takumi Iroha. At Mask Fiesta 2015 on October 25, 2015, Watanabe, wrestling under the ring name Fuzzy Peach, teamed up with Starlight Kid in a loss to Iotica and Mini Iotica. On December 6, 2016, Watanabe received her first title match where she teamed with Io Shirai and Mayu Iwatani to challenge for the vacant Artist of Stardom Championship, which was won by Hyper Destroyers (Evie, Hiroyo Matsumoto and Kellie Skater) in a three-way tag team match, which also involved Oedo Tai (Act Yasukawa, Kris Wolf and Kyoko Kimura).

Entering 2016, Watanabe and Jungle Kyona teamed together under the name JKGReeeeN. On January 10, JKGReeeeN challenged Thunder Rock (Io Shirai and Mayu Iwatani) for the Goddesses of Stardom Championship, but were unsuccessful. JKGReeeeN continued to wrestle through 2016 and participated in the 2016 Goddesses of Stardom Tag League, in which they did not reach the finals.

==== Queen's Quest (2016–2021) ====
Shortly after the 2016 Goddesses of Stardom Tag League, Watanabe turned on Jungle Kyona and joined Queen's Quest.

On January 7, 2017, Watanabe, along with HZK and Shirai, defeated Kagetsu, Kyoko Kimura and Viper, who replaced Hana Kimura due to injury, to win the Artist of Stardom Championship. Later in January, Watanabe suffered an ACL injury during training that forced her to go on a hiatus. On April 9, the Artist of Stardom Championship was vacated due to Watanabe being unable to perform because of her injury. After 10 months of injury, Watanabe returned on November 4, where she defeated Kris Wolf.

On February 18, 2018, Watanabe challenged the leader of Queen's Quest Shirai for the Wonder of Stardom Championship in the main event at the Korakuen Hall, but was unsuccessful. On April 30, Watanabe won the 2018 Cinderella Tournament after defeating Bea Priestley in the finals. She expressed her wish which was a match for the Wonder of Stardom Championship against the then-time champion Io Shirai. On May 23, Watanabe defeated Shirai to win the Wonder title, becoming the youngest wrestler to hold the title at the age of 18.

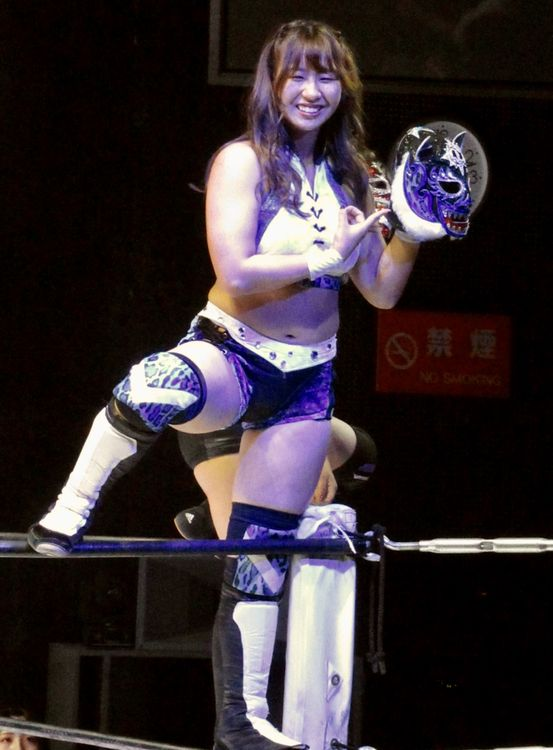
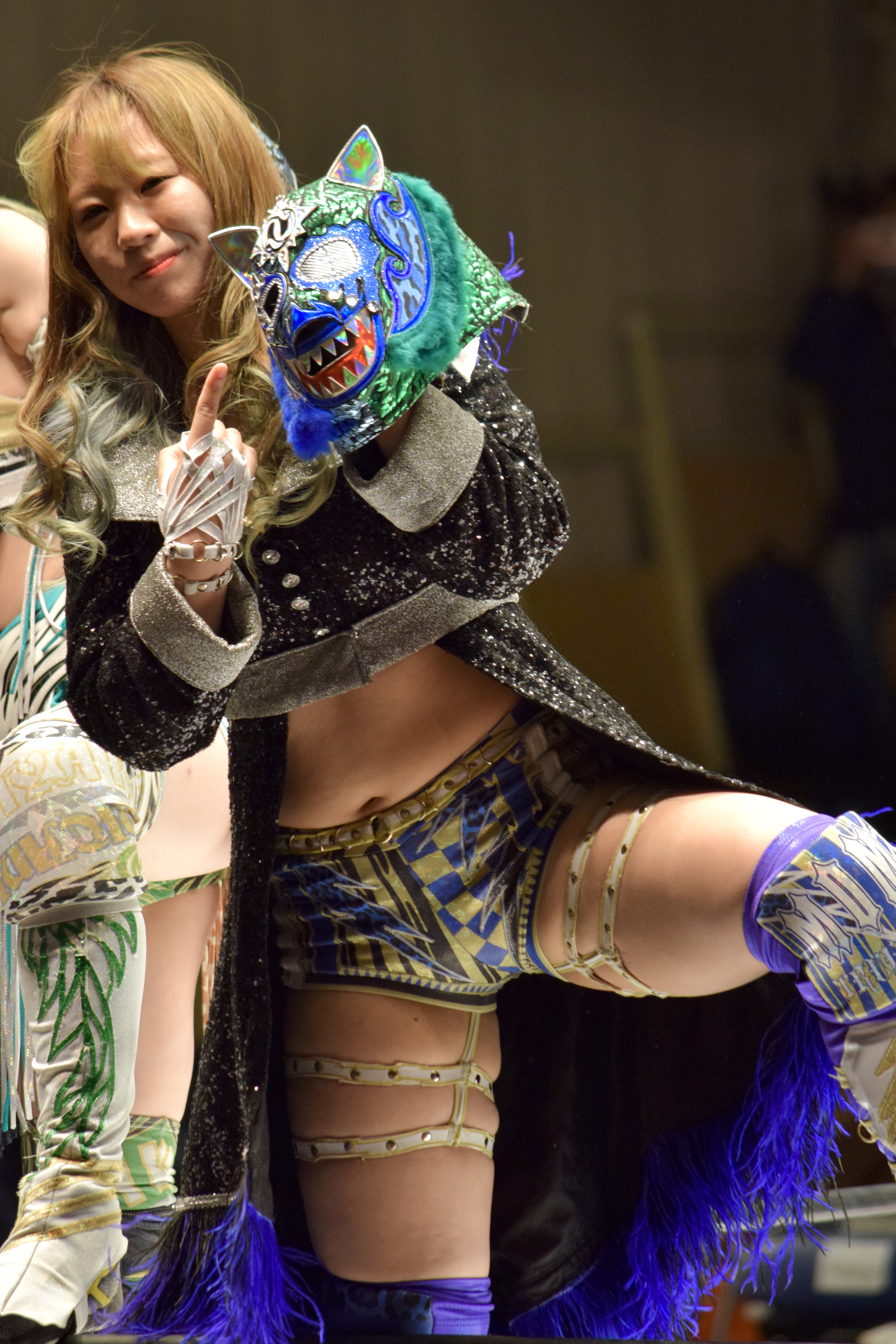
During her leadership of Queen's Quest, Watanabe was known for wearing the unit's usual mask which was inspired from Tiger Mask. Her pieces were usually dark-blue coloured.

In June 2018, Watanabe became the leader of Queen's Quest following Io Shirai's departure from Stardom. At Mask Fiesta 2018 on October 28, Watanabe, under the ring name Black Fuzzy Peach, donned a mask and teamed up with Masked Wan-chan, Mini Iotica and Red Snake to defeat Fancy Maruyama, Natsuki Urabe, Reo Hazuki and Yukari Ishino. On November 4, Watanabe and Utami Hayashishita won the 2018 Goddesses of Stardom Tag League after defeating Bea Priestley and Chardonnay in the finals. On November 23, Hayashishita and Watanabe won the Goddesses of Stardom Championship by defeating J.A.N. (Jungle Kyona and Natsuko Tora).

On April 5, 2019, Watanabe participated in Stardom's first event at the United States in New York City, where she successfully defended the Wonder of Stardom Championship against her tag team partner Utami Hayashishita. At Stardom Cinderella Tournament 2019 on April 29, Watanabe fell short to Konami in the first rounds. On May 16, Watanabe lost the Wonder of Stardom Championship to Arisa Hoshiki, ending her reign at 358 days, and setting a record with most successful title defenses, at 13. On July 15, Hayashishita and Watanabe lost the Goddesses of Stardom Championship to Tokyo Cyber Squad (Jungle Kyona and Konami). On November 23, Watanabe, along with AZM and Hayashishita, won the Artist of Stardom Championship after they defeated Andras Miyagi, Kagetsu and Natsu Sumire.

On January 19, 2020, during the main event of Stardom 9th Anniversary, Watanabe challenged Iwatani for the World of Stardom Championship, but was unsuccessful. On February 8, AZM, Hayashishita and Watanabe lost the Artist of Stardom Championship to Donna Del Mondo (Giulia, Maika and Syuri). At Stardom Yokohama Cinderella 2020 on October 3, she unsuccessfully challenged Bea Priestley for the SWA World Championship. On November 8, Watanabe, along with AZM, won the 2020 Goddesses of Stardom Tag League when they defeated Giulia and Maika in the finals. After winning the Tag League, AZM and Watanabe challenged Hayashishita and Saya Kamitani on November 14 for the Goddesses of Stardom Championship, but were unsuccessful. On December 20, Watanabe challenged Hayashishita for the World of Stardom Championship, but was unsuccessful. At Stardom Osaka Dream Cinderella 2020 on December 20, Watanabe unsuccessfully challenged Utami Hayashishita for the World of Stardom Championship.

On January 30, 2021, she challenged Syuri for the SWA World Championship, but was unsuccessful. At Stardom Cinderella Tournament 2021, she Watanabe fell short to Starlight Kid in the first rounds from April 10. At the Stardom 5 Star Grand Prix 2021, Watanabe fought in the "Red Goddess" block which she won with a total of 12 points. She then fell short to Syuri in the finals on September 25. At Stardom 10th Anniversary Grand Final Osaka Dream Cinderella on October 9, 2021, Watanabe teamed up with Saya Kamitani and AZM to unsuccessfully challenge MaiHimePoi (Maika, Himeka and Natsupoi) for th Artist of Stardom Championship. Watanabe had been the victim of Starlight Kid's mind games as the latter's strategy to gain more recruits into Oedo Tai since Kawasaki Super Wars, the first event of the Stardom Super Wars trilogy which took place on November 3, 2021, Watanabe unsuccessfully challenged Starlight Kid for the High Speed Championship. At Tokyo Super Wars on November 27, Watanabe teamed up with AZM to defeat Unagi Sayaka and Lady C.

==== Oedo Tai (2021–2024) ====
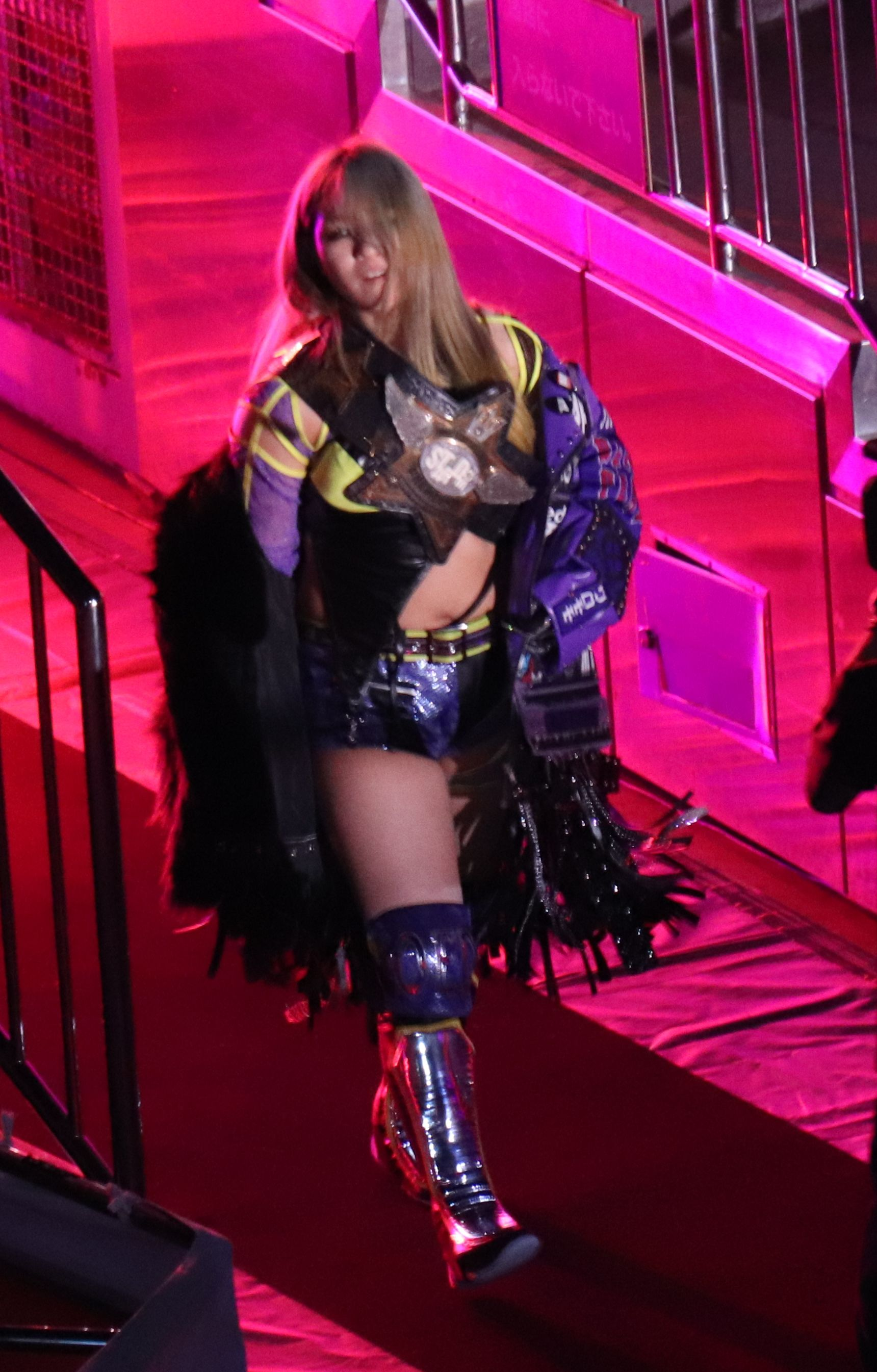
Watanabe on the second night of the Stardom World Climax 2022 of March 27.

Watanabe and Kid's feud degenerated into an eight-woman elimination tag team match in which both of them would be the captains of their respective teams. The loser captain would be forced to join the enemy unit and if Kid lost she would also have to unmask. The match took place on December 18, at Osaka Super Wars, the event which represented the last part of the "Super Wars" trilogy. With the match coming down to the wire and Queen's Quest holding a 2 to 1 advantage over Starlight Kid a shocking moment occurred when Watanabe betrayed her faction and hit her long-time tag team partner AZM over the head with a chair, handing the win to Oedo Tai and anointing herself the “Black Peach” of the group, turning heel in the process.

At Stardom Nagoya Supreme Fight on January 29, 2022, Watanabe and Starlight Kid battled Queens Quest's Utami Hayashishita and AZM in a winning effort as a result of a grudge tag team match. On the first night of the Stardom World Climax 2022 from March 26, Watanabe teamed up with Kid as "Black Desire" to defeat FWC (Hazuki and Koguma) for the Goddesses of Stardom Championship. At the Stardom Cinderella Tournament 2022, Watanabe fell short to AZM in the first rounds from April 3. At Stardom Golden Week Fight Tour on May 5, 2022, she alongside Starlight Kid dropped back the Goddesses of Stardom Championship to Hazuki and Koguma. At Stardom Flashing Champions on May 28, 2022, she teamed up with Saki Kashima and Starlight Kid to defeat MaiHimePoi (Maika, Himeka and Natsupoi) for the Artist of Stardom Championship. At Stardom Fight in the Top on June 26, 2022, she alongside Kashima and Kid successfully defended the artist titles against God's Eye (Syuri, Ami Sourei and Mirai) and Donna Del Mondo (Giulia, Maika and Mai Sakurai). At Mid Summer Champions in Tokyo, the first event of the Stardom Mid Summer Champions which took place on July 9, 2022, Watanabe unsuccessfully challenged Syuri for the World of Stardom Championship. At Mid Summer Champions in Osaka on July 24, she alongside Kid and Kashima defended the artist titles again against Giulia, Maika and Himeka. At the Stardom 5 Star Grand Prix 2022, Watanabe fought in the "Blue Stars" block, scoring a total of 12 points. At Stardom x Stardom: Nagoya Midsummer Encounter on August 21, 2022, Watanabe, Kid and Kashima successfully defended the artist titles against Cosmic Angels (Mina Shirakawa, Unagi Sayaka and Saki).

==== H.A.T.E. (2024–present) ====
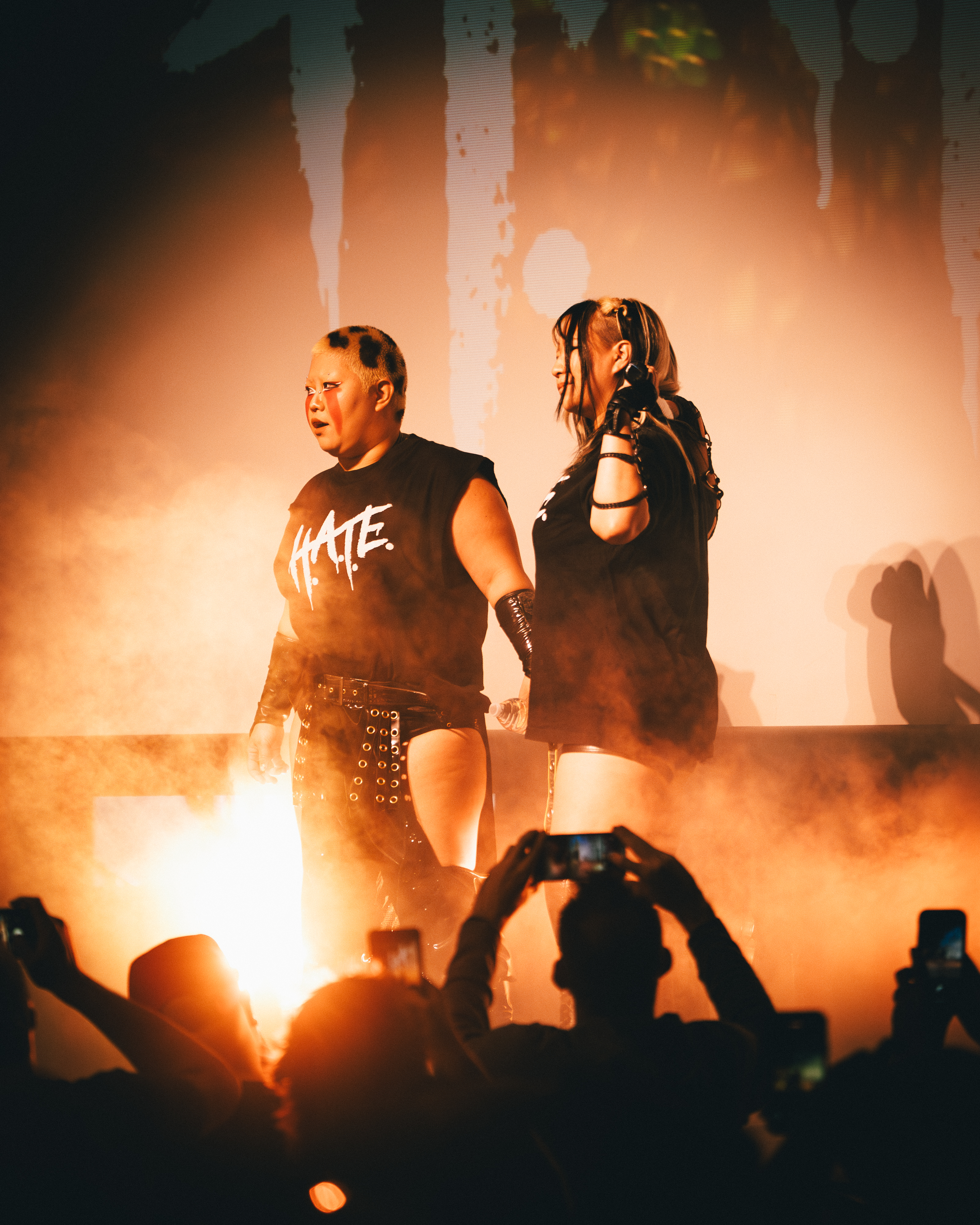
Watanabe (right) with Natsuko Tora as "XL" in April 2025.

On the second night of the Stardom Sapporo World Rendezvous on July 28, 2024, Tora announced the dissolution of Oedo Tai and the birth of the newly created unit of H.A.T.E. (which represented a spinoff of the latter unit) featuring herself, Saya Kamitani, Momo Watanabe, Thekla, Konami, Rina and Ruaka.

Starting on July 27, 2025, Watanabe participated in the Stardom 5 Star Grand Prix 2025 as part of the Blue Stars B group. She scored 8 points and finished third overall, thus qualifying to the first round of the playoffs, facing Ami Sohrei. On night 12 she defeated Sohrei and Sareee in the quarterfinals. On night 13 she defeated Saori Anou in the semifinals and AZM in the finals, winning the 5★Star GP for the first time.
On November 3, 2025 at Stardom Crimson Nightmare, Watanabe used her 5★Star GP victory to challenge fellow stablemate Saya Kamitani for both the World of Stardom Championship and the NJPW Strong Women's Champion, but lost the match by pinfall.

=== New Japan Pro-Wrestling (2021, 2024) ===
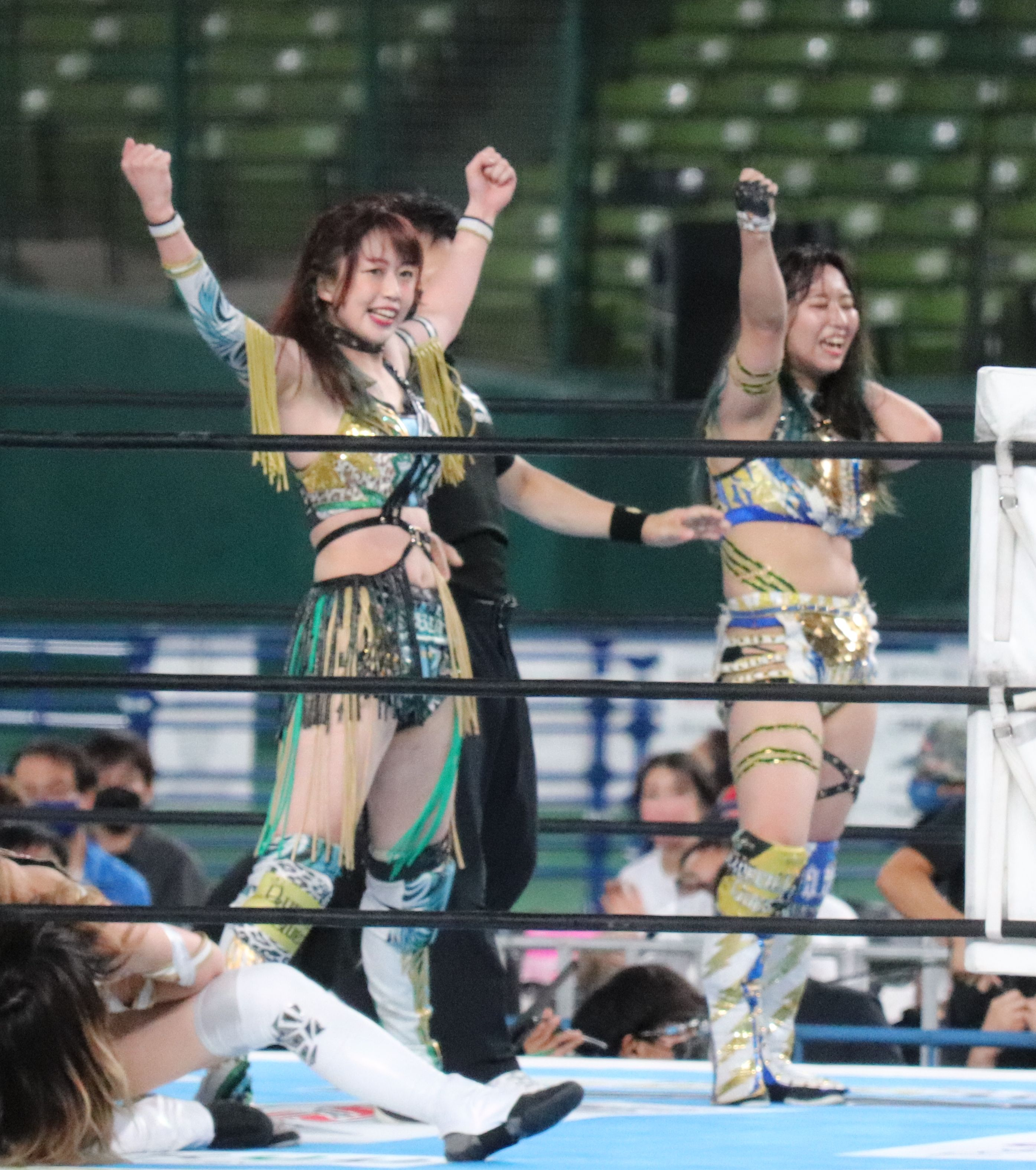
Watanabe (right) and Saya Kamitani (left) after their victory at Wrestle Grand Slam in MetLife Dome on September 4, 2021

Watanabe wrestled in exhibition matches scheduled by New Japan Pro-Wrestling in order to promote joshi talent. On the first night of the Wrestle Grand Slam in MetLife Dome from September 4, Watanabe teamed up with Saya Kamitani to defeat with Lady C and Maika. On the second night from September 5, the two fell short to Giulia and Syuri

At Forbidden Door on June 30, Watanabe and Kris Statlander lost to Willow Nightingale and Tam Nakano on the Zero Hour show.

On August 30 at Capital Collision, Watanabe unsuccessfully challenged Mercedes Moné for the Strong Women's Championship.

=== All Elite Wrestling (2025–present) ===
On January 5, 2025 at the co-promoted show Wrestle Dynasty, Watanabe represented Stardom and defeated ROH's Athena, CMLL's Persephone, and AEW's Willow Nightingale to win the International Women’s Cup, earning a title shot in either promotion. On the February 19 episode of AEW Dynamite, it was revealed that Watanabe chose to invoke her title shot against Mercedes Moné for her AEW TBS Championship at Revolution. On the March 8 episode of Collision she made her AEW in ring debut against Serena Deeb picking up the win. At Revolution on March 9, she failed to win the title at the event.

== Championships and accomplishments ==
- All Elite Wrestling & Ring of Honor & New Japan Pro-Wrestling & World Wonder Ring Stardom & Consejo Mundial de Lucha Libre
  - International Women’s Cup (2025)
- Pro Wrestling Illustrated
  - Ranked No. 28 of the top 100 female singles wrestlers in the PWI Women's 100 in 2020
  - Ranked No. 20 of the top 50 tag teams in the PWI Tag Team 50 in 2020 with AZM, Saya Kamitani and Utami Hayashishita
- World Wonder Ring Stardom
  - Artist of Stardom Championship (3 times) – with AZM and Utami Hayashishita (1), HZK and Io Shirai (1), Saki Kashima and Starlight Kid (1)
  - Goddesses of Stardom Championship (3 times) – with Utami Hayashishita (1), Starlight Kid (1) and Thekla (1)
  - Wonder of Stardom Championship (1 time)
  - Cinderella Tournament (2018)
  - Goddesses of Stardom Tag League – with Utami Hayashishita (2018) and AZM (2020)
  - 5★Star GP (2025)
  - 5★Star GP Award (3 times)
    - 5★Star GP Fighting Spirit Award (2018)
    - Red Stars Best Match Award (2024) vs. Mayu Iwatani on August 15 in Red Stars B
    - 5★Star GP Blue Stars Best Match Award (2026) vs. Saya Kamitani on August 3 in Blue Stars B
  - Stardom Year-End Award (6 times)
    - Best Tag Team Award (2018) with Utami Hayashishita
    - Best Unit Award (2021) as part of Oedo Tai, shared with Natsuko Tora, Rina, Ruaka, Saki Kashima and Starlight Kid
    - Fighting Spirit Award (2016, 2024)
    - MVP Award (2018)
    - Best Match Award (2024) vs. Mayu Iwatani
