= Candy Floss (wrestler) =

Croatian-English wrestler (born 1999)

Personal information
- Born: Amy Samardzija; 8 November 1999 (age 26) London, England

Professional wrestling career
- Ring name: Candy Floss
- Billed from: 'The Candy Kingdom'
- Trained by: Progress Wrestling Dojo; WWE Performance Center
- Debut: 14 November 2016

Amy Samardzija (born 8 November 1999) is a Croatian-English professional wrestler, better known for her ring name Candy Floss. She has performed on WWE and NXT UK.

== Professional wrestling career ==
Floss has wrestled all over the UK independent circuit. She has wrestled at many wrestling promotions such as Pro-Wrestling EVE and even winning her first match there by pinning Chakara. On 14 April 2018, Floss made her Stardom debut, facing Shiki Shibusawa which Floss won. Floss ended up facing many other wrestlers such as Hana Kimura, Natsu Sumire, Zoe Lucas and many more. Floss had her final match for Stardom on 27 May 2018, facing Konami.

On 13 October 2018, (later televised on December 5) Floss made her NXT UK debut against Rhea Ripley and challenged her for NXT UK Women's Championship, which Floss lost by pinfall. On 31 January 2020, it was announced Floss had signed with the company and that she would be competing in the NXT UK women's division. On 4 July 2021, Floss announced that she was "on leave" by WWE due to her mental health. On December that year, her contract with WWE expired.
