= Kagetsu =

Japanese professional wrestler

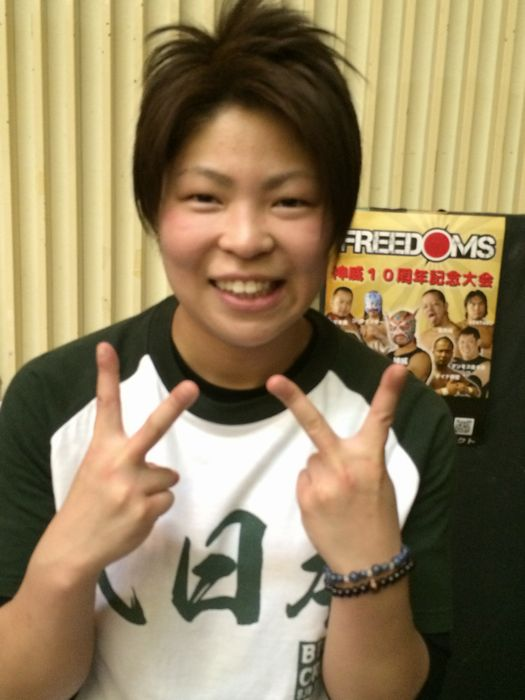
- Ishino in 2015

Personal information
- Born: Yukari Ishino (石野由加莉, Ishino Yukari); June 24, 1992 (age 34) Osaka, Japan

Professional wrestling career
- Ring name(s): Kagetsu; Yukari Ishino
- Billed height: 5 ft 3 in (160 cm)
- Billed weight: 136 lb (62 kg)
- Trained by: Meiko Satomura
- Debut: August 24, 2008
- Retired: February 24, 2020

Yu Ishino (Japanese: 石野結, Hepburn: Ishino Yū) (born Yukari Ishino (石野由加莉, Ishino Yukari) on June 24, 1992), better known by his (Note: Ishino performed as a female wrestler before coming out as a transgender man. This article uses he/him for consistency.) ring name Kagetsu (花月), is a Japanese retired professional wrestler. He is best known for his time in Stardom, JWP, Sendai Girls and various independent promotions.

== Professional wrestling career ==
=== Independent circuit (2008–2020) ===
Kagetsu was trained by Sendai Girls' Pro Wrestling. He joined in April 2008 after his junior high school graduation. He had an exhibition match against Ryo Mizunami on July 27, 2008. He made his official debut on August 24, 2008, against Chikayo Nagashima.

In 2010, he changed his ring name from Yukari Ishino to Kagetsu.

In 2015, he left Sendai Girls and became a freelancer.

=== World Wonder Ring Stardom (2016–2020) ===
The promotion in which Ishino is best known for performing was World Wonder Ring Stardom. In April 2016, he debuted as part of the Oedo Tai stable. He won the Artist of Stardom Titles with Kyoko Kimura and Hana Kimura. On June 16, 2016, he teamed with Kyoko Kimura to capture the Goddesses of Stardom Championship. The team held the titles until December 22, 2016, when they were defeated by Yoko Bito and Kairi Hojo. He took a break from wrestling on April 13, 2017, but returned on June 11 as the new leader of Oedo Tai. On June 21, he teamed up with Hana Kimura to defeat Hiroyo Matsumoto and Jungle Kyona for the Goddesses of Stardom Championship. Due to limiting themselves to a trio, Kagetsu, Kris Wolf and Hana Kimura would look for new recruits as they brought Tam Nakano to the unit on September 10, during the 5STAR Grand Prix. Another member presented by Kagetsu on November 4, during the Goddesses of Stardom Tag League was Sumire Natsu who came from Pro Wrestling Wave. He became an official member of the Stardom roster on November 1, 2017.

On June 9, 2018, he captured the World of Stardom Championship from Toni Storm.

==== Ring of Honor (2018–2019) ====
Also in 2018 Kagestu entered the inaugural Women of Honor Championship tournament in Ring of Honor (ROH) but lost to Sumie Sakai in the quarterfinals.

At Stardom Cinderella Tournament 2019, Ishino went into a time-limit draw against Tam Nakano in the first rounds of the event which took place on April 29. On May 4, Kagetsu lost the World of Stardom Championship to Bea Priestley. In December, Ishino announced his retirement from professional wrestling which would take place on February 24, 2020. The final match took place at an event named "Many Face" where Ishino fell short to his coach Meiko Satomura.

Kagetsu came out of retirement on May 23, 2021 to wrestle on the Hana Kimura Memorial Show in an eight-woman tag team match, where he teamed up with former Oedo Tai stablemate Hazuki and former Tokyo Cyber Squad members Konami and Death Yama-san in a losing effort against Asuka, Syuri, Natsupoi and Mio Momono. Kagetsu would lose again to Asuka the same night in a singles match. He has been inactive ever since. Ishino made an appearance at Hana Kimura Memorial Show 2 on May 23, 2022 as the ambassador of the event.

== Personal life ==
On May 13, 2022, Ishino came out as a transgender man in a video posted in his channel, changing his given name from "Yukari" to "Yu".

== Championships and accomplishments ==
- JWP Joshi Puroresu
  - JWP Junior Championship (1 time)
  - Princess of Pro-Wrestling Championship (1 time)
- Pro Wrestling Illustrated
  - Ranked No. 18 of the top 100 female wrestlers in the PWI Female 100 in 2018
- Pro Wrestling Wave
  - Catch the Wave Award (1 time)
    - Fighting Spirit Award (2013)
- Oz Academy
  - Oz Academy Tag Team Championship (2 times) – with Kaho Kobayashi
- World Wonder Ring Stardom
  - Artist of Stardom Championship (2 times) – with Hana Kimura and Kyoko Kimura (1), Andras Miyagi and Natsu Sumire (1)
  - Goddesses of Stardom Championship (2 time) – with Kyoto Kimura (1) and Hana Kimura (1)
  - World of Stardom Championship (1 time)
  - 5★Star GP Award (3 times)
    - 5★Star GP Best Match Award (2017) vs. Mayu Iwatani on September 18
    - 5★Star GP Best Match Award (2018) vs. Jungle Kyona on September 8
    - 5★Star GP Best Match Award (2019) vs. Jungle Kyona on September 8
  - Stardom Year-End Award (2 times)
    - Best Match Award (2018) with Hazuki vs. Io Shirai and Mayu Iwatani on June 17
    - Best Tag Team Award (2017) with Hana Kimura
