= World Wonder Ring Stardom =

Women's professional wrestling promotion

Stardom Co., Ltd.
- Trade name: World Wonder Ring Stardom
- Native name: 株式会社スターダム
- Romanized name: Kabushiki gaisha Sutādamu
- Formerly: Stardom Co., Ltd. (2010–2019, 2024–present); Bushiroad Fight Co., Ltd. (2019–2024)
- Type: Subsidiary
- Industry: Professional wrestling
- Genre: Women's professional wrestling (Joshi puroresu)
- Founded: September 7, 2010; 16 years ago
- Founder: Fuka Kakimoto; Rossy Ogawa; Nanae Takahashi
- Headquarters: Sumitomo Nakanosakaue Bldg 1-38-1 Chuo, Nakano, Tokyo, Japan
- Key people: Taro Okada (President and CEO)
- Products: Home video; Live events; Merchandise; Music; Pay-per-view; Publishing; Video on demand
- Services: Licensing
- Parent: Bushiroad
- Website: wwr-stardom.com

Stardom Co., Ltd. (Japanese: 株式会社スターダム, Hepburn: Kabushiki gaisha Sutādamu; d/b/a World Wonder Ring Stardom; stylized as ST★RDOM), is a Japanese joshi puroresu or women's professional wrestling promotion based in Nakano, Tokyo, Japan. Stardom was founded in September 2010 by former All Japan Women's Pro-Wrestling (AJW) co-producer Rossy Ogawa, retired professional wrestler and mixed martial artist Fuka Kakimoto, and former AJW veteran professional wrestler Nanae Takahashi. From June 2024, Stardom was a subsidiary of New Japan Pro-Wrestling (NJPW) until April 2026, where Stardom went back to being a wholly owned subsidiary of Bushiroad.

Stardom quickly became one of the top joshi puroresu promotions, largely thanks to gravure idol Yuzuki Aikawa becoming the promotion's public face. Much like JDStar, Stardom also places heavy emphasis on the physical attractiveness of its workers, and publishes several modeling photobooks and calendars of its workers per year. Stardom's in-ring style takes influence from mixed martial arts with many workers relying on kicks as the main part of their offense.

Stardom frequently holds shows across Japan. In 2020, "We Are Stardom!!" started airing on BS Nittele and Tokyo MX, which marked the first time that a joshi puroresu promotion had a weekly national television program since AJW left Fuji TV in 2002.

== History ==
=== Formation ===
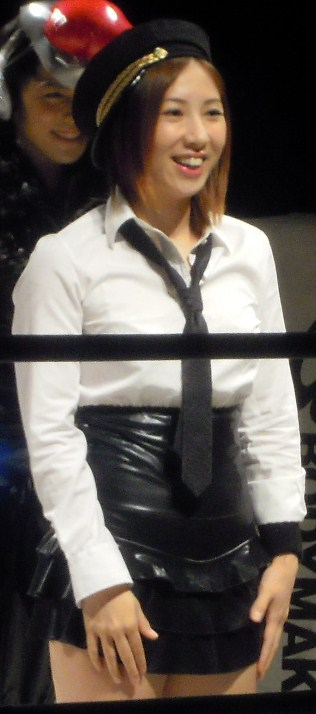
Fuka, the General Manager of Stardom

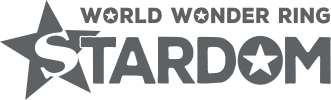
One of the previous logos of the company from 2019–2020

After retiring from professional wrestling on March 29, 2010, Fuka began training Yuzuki Aikawa, a notable gravure idol signed to Platinum Production, the same modeling agency as her, for a career in professional wrestling. In April 2010, Fuka was approached by Rossy Ogawa, about starting a new promotion with Aikawa as the top star. During the summer of 2010, Fuka continued training Aikawa for her upcoming debut planned for October, while also training newcomers such as Mayu Iwatani, Arisa Hoshiki, Yoshiko, Yoko Bito, and Eri Susa. These plans came together by September when Ogawa held a press conference with the newly formed roster of Fuka's trainees and Aikawa in attendance to announce a new promotion named World Wonder Ring Stardom. Fuka was appointed general manager of the promotion, as well as the role of ring announcer. Veteran All Japan Women's Pro-Wrestling (AJW) wrestler Nanae Takahashi was appointed the playing manager. In addition to Fuka's trainees, Aikawa, and Takahashi, Takahashi's longtime associate and fellow AJW wrestler Natsuki☆Taiyo and mixed martial artist Mika Nagano, who had some experience in professional wrestling with the Ice Ribbon promotion, joined the promotion.

=== 2011–2013 ===
Stardom held its first event, Birth of Nova, on January 23, 2011, in Tokyo's Shin-Kiba 1st Ring, the venue that would frequently host events for the promotion in the following years and was also the location of Stardom's earliest training dojo. Originally, Stardom named and promoted events in the format of "seasons", with one season lasting, on average, two months. The opening match involved seasoned Takahashi and Taiyo, as well as Aikawa. The main event of the debut show saw Yoko Bito, who had an extensive Karate background before her wrestling training against 17-year-old Yoshiko. The two were considered the top trainees on the new roster.

Stardom continued holding shows at Shin-Kiba 1st Ring each month before eventually holding their first-ever show at Korakuen Hall on July 24. At the event, 9-year-old Haruka, who had debuted on the first show, faced DDT Pro-Wrestling star Kenny Omega in a match that became a viral hit on YouTube, reaching over 1 million views. Several champions were crowned at the event as well. Aikawa defeated Yoshiko to become the first-ever Wonder of Stardom Champion and Natsuki Taiyo defeated JWP wrestler Leon to win the High Speed Championship. The inaugural World of Stardom Champion was crowned in a four-person tournament, with Takahashi defeating Bito in the final. Another notable development in Stardom's Korakuen Hall debut was freelancer Io Shirai, who had been appearing in various other Joshi Puroresu promotions alongside her sister, Mio Shirai, and Kana as the stable Triple Tails. Shirai made a surprise appearance at the end of Stardom X Stardom, requesting to join the company.

The crowning of the first-ever Goddesses of Stardom Championship began on October 10 with the Goddesses of Stardom Tag League, a round-robin tournament that has been held annually since. The team of Yuzuki Aikawa and Yoko Bito, collectively known as BY Hou, defeated Yoshiko and Natsuki Taiyo (Kawasaki Katsushika Saikyou Densetsu) in the finals on November 27.

On November 12, the first Rookie of Stardom award was given, in which rookie wrestlers that had debuted within the year faced off. The final saw Yoshiko defeating Arisa Hoshiki to become the first recipient.

In May 2012, Io Shirai had gone to Mexico for a tour and was involved in an incident when returning to Japan. Upon her return to Japan, Shirai and then-boyfriend Nosawa Rongai (a freelance Japanese professional wrestler) were arrested at the Narita International Airport in Narita, Chiba on suspicion of trying to smuggle 75 grams of marijuana hidden inside paintings of the two into the country. Both Shirai and Nosawa denied the charges, claiming that the paintings were gifts from fans. Shirai was released from a detention center on June 12. On June 21, Shirai held a press conference, publicly apologizing to her fans, employers and co-workers, while again denying the charges. On June 28, Japan's public prosecutor's office decided not to prosecute Shirai over the incident. On July 9, Mexico-based Japanese wrestler Takuya Sugi held a press conference and confessed to planting the drugs on Shirai and Nosawa. According to Sugi, Masahiro Hayashi, who worked as a liaison between Lucha Libre AAA Worldwide and Japan and who apparently had a personal grudge with Nosawa, had promised him a contract extension with AAA in exchange for the deed.

The first 5★Star Grand Prix, a two-block round-robin tournament, commenced on August 19 at Shin-Kiba 1st Ring, and ran until September 30, becoming their biggest annual tournament every year. The finals saw Yuzuki Aikawa defeating Kyoko Kimura on September 30.

At Stardom Year-End Climax in December, the creation of the promotion's trios championship, the Artist of Stardom Championship, was announced.

Stardom's next Korakuen Hall show on March 17, Stardom the Highest, would mark a World of Stardom title change for the first time when German wrestler Alpha Female, now aligned with Kyoko Kimura's Kimura Monster-gun unit, defeated Nanae Takahashi for the World of Stardom Championship. On April 29, Yuzuki Aikawa had the first of what would become a tradition for many departing Stardom wrestlers in the form of a gauntlet match, where they face the entire roster in one-minute singles matches.

Stardom Ryōgoku Cinderella Champions Fiesta 2013 was the biggest event in the history of Stardom in its two-year history to that point, taking place April 29 at the historic Ryōgoku Kokugikan venue in Tokyo. It was the first joshi puroresu event held in the venue in six years. The card featured four of Stardom's five titles on the line, various participants from other wrestling promotions, including male wrestlers, and was headlined by the retirement match of Yuzuki Aikawa. The event was attended by 5,500 fans, making it Stardom's largest crowd to date in their two-year history. A special movie edition of the event, featuring backstage material, was premiered at a theater in Ichikawa, Chiba and released on DVD on September 28.

=== 2014–2018 ===
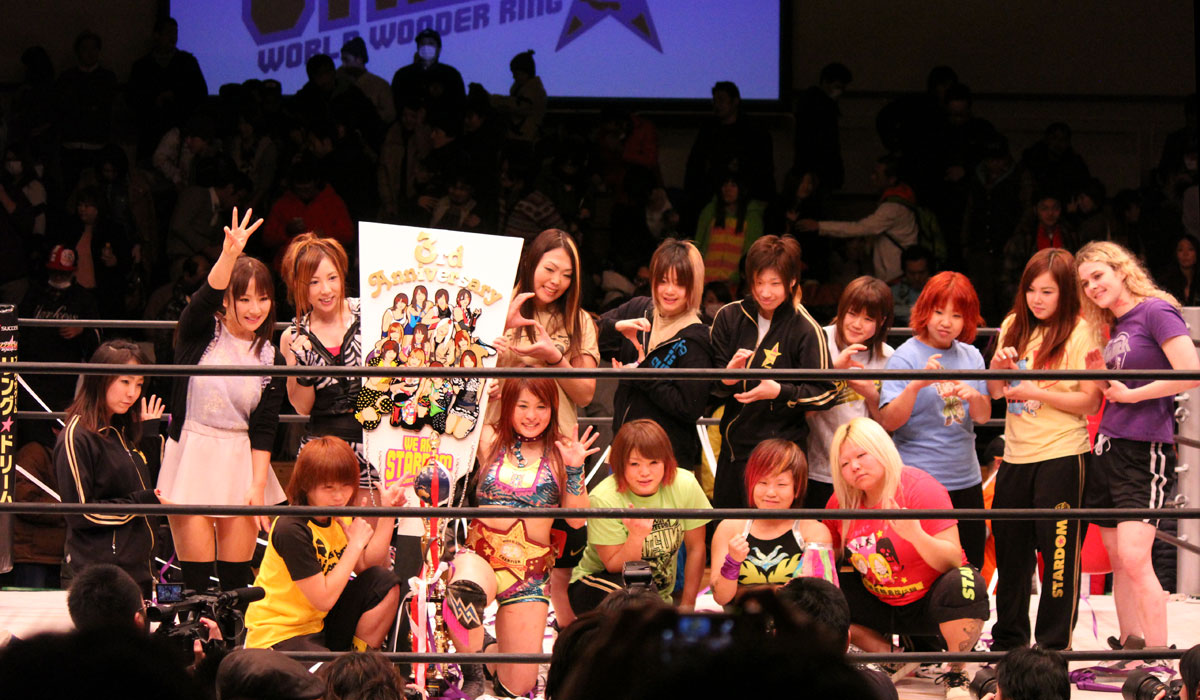
Stardom's roster at the promotion's third-anniversary event in April 2014

In 2014, a new monthly television program began airing on Samurai TV during this time called Stardom Cafe. The program was hosted by Yuzuki Aikawa and took place in a cafe. Aikawa interviewed various wrestlers on the roster as well as showed highlights of recent matches and activities outside the ring. Stardom Cafe ran each month until December 2015.

Starting in 2015, Stardom began holding Korakuen Hall shows every month, making them the first Joshi Puroresu promotion since Gaea Japan to do so.

At Stardom's next Korakuen Hall show on February 22, 2015, Stardom Queen's Shout, the main event of Yoshiko defending her World of Stardom Championship against Act Yasukawa ended in controversy when the match had to be ended prematurely. Yoshiko and Yasukawa began shooting on each other, a boundary in professional wrestling that is rarely crossed. Yoshiko gained the advantage in the situation and severely injured Yasukawa's face, to the point where veteran referee Kyohei Wada had to stop the match. Following the match, Yasukawa was rushed to a Tokyo hospital, where she was diagnosed with fractured cheek, nasal and orbital bones and required surgery. Yasukawa had, just two months earlier, returned from a long injury break brought on by thyroid issues, during which she had also undergone cataract surgery. In addition to the outcome, leading up to the show, Yoshiko had refused to sign the contract for the match, as she felt Yasukawa was unfit to challenge for her title after their previous title match had been cancelled due to Yasukawa's Graves' disease flare. Yoshiko eventually signed the contract in the ring just before their match after Yasukawa and her new Oedo Tai teammates attacked her. Stardom's president Rossy Ogawa publicly apologized for the incident and called an emergency meeting for February 23 with general manager Fuka Kakimoto and top senpais for the roster to discuss the situation. On February 25, Stardom held a press conference where Yoshiko publicly apologized for her actions, was stripped of the World of Stardom Championship and was suspended indefinitely. Ogawa, Kakimoto and Takahashi also announced they were taking a 30% pay cut for the next three months. Stardom also banned face punches from the promotion. Violations resulted in a disqualification for the first offense. A ringside doctor is now assigned to all future events and Kairi Hojo was subsequently named intermediary between the wrestlers and management in order to bring the two sides closer. The incident received mainstream attention in Japan and became known as Seisan Matchi (凄惨マッチ; "Ghastly Match"). This would end up being Yoshiko's final appearance for Stardom.

April 23 saw the beginning of a new annual event, the Cinderella Tournament, a one-day single-elimination tournament, with the winner being presented a dress by Yuzuki Aikawa and is granted a wish of their choice. The methods of winning consist of pinfall, submission, over-the-top-rope elimination, ten-minute time limit (except for the final), with time limit draws resulting in a double elimination. Mayu Iwatani won the first tournament by defeating Koguma in the final.

Also in 2015, Stardom held shows in Los Angeles County, California. This was the first time that Stardom held shows outside of Japan. Stardom's first United States show took place on October 16 in Covina, California, main evented by Io Shirai successfully defending her Wonder of Stardom Championship against Mia Yim. The second show took place two days later in Baldwin Park, California, headlined by Thunder Rock retaining their Goddesses of Stardom Championship against the team of Hiroyo Matsumoto & Kellie Skater.

In November, Stardom began an interpromotional feud with Sendai Girls' Pro Wrestling during the latter's Korakuen Hall show. The event saw Meiko Satomura, Dash Chisako, Sendai Sachiko, Cassandra Miyagi, Mika Iwata, and Chihiro Hashimoto against Io Shirai, Mayu Iwatani, Kairi Hojo, Momo Watanabe, Hiromi Mimura, and Kris Wolf, in a series of singles matches with gauntlet rules. Three days later, at Stardom's Korakuen Hall show, Mayu Iwatani was defeated by Meiko Satomura in her challenge for the World of Stardom Championship and Io Shirai successfully defended her Wonder of Stardom Championship against challenger Sendai Sachiko; the two had gone to a time limit draw three days earlier.

On February 28, 2016, Stardom launched Stardom World, a worldwide paid video service through YouTube. The service was later moved to its own website. In April, Io Shirai, Kairi Hojo and Mayu Iwatani represented Stardom in the United States, taking part in events for Lucha Underground and a match at the Cauliflower Alley Club.

In May, Threedom (Shirai, Iwatani, and Hojo) traveled to Europe, taking part in shows in Spain, France, and England. A new championship was introduced on the show in Spain, the Stardom World Association (SWA) World Championship. Io Shirai defeated Toni Storm in a tournament final to determine the first champion. The qualifications of defending the SWA title were that the opponent must be a different nationality to the champion.

On February 18, 2018, Stardom announced the creation of the promotion's seventh active title, the Future of Stardom Championship, the title is meant for wrestlers with less than two years of experience in professional wrestling or under the age of 20.

=== 2019–present ===
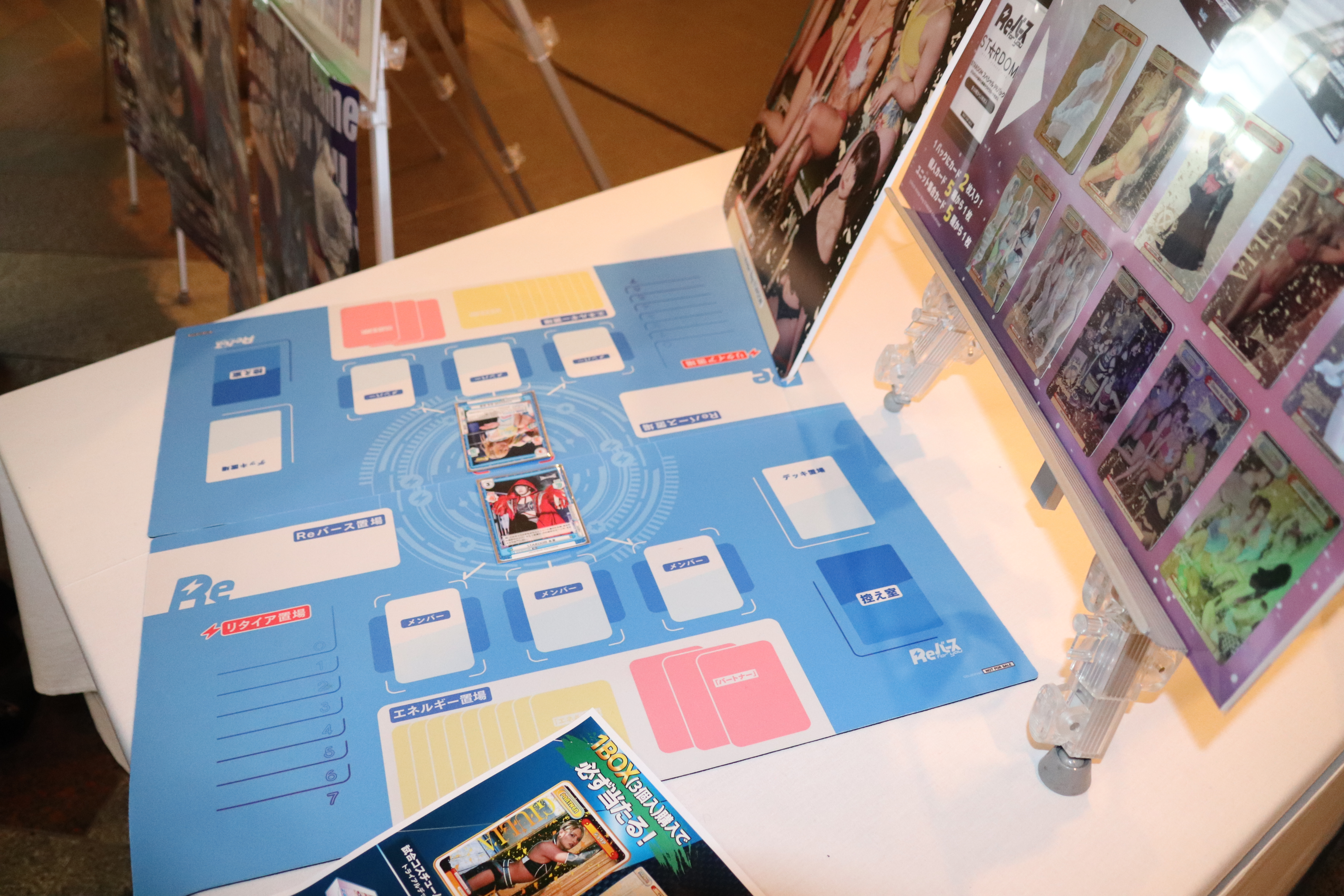
Stardom's trading card game released at the 2022 Stardom World Climax from March 27

Stardom also introduced a new collaboration with Fire Pro Wrestling World, a video game developed by Spike Chunsoft. This would be Stardom's first involvement with a video game and was released on August 22, 2019. Kagetsu, Hazuki, Andras Miyagi, Utami Hayashishita, Momo Watanabe, Mayu Iwatani, Arisa Hoshiki, Starlight Kid, Jungle Kyona, and Hana Kimura would be the Stardom wrestlers that were created for the release and all appeared in the ring during the announcement.

On October 17, a press conference was held in which the purchase of Stardom by entertainment company, Bushiroad, was announced. Bushiroad is also the owner of New Japan Pro-Wrestling, making Stardom their sister promotion. Rossy Ogawa would remain as Stardom's executive producer. Katsuhiko Harada was appointed as president, Harada was the former president of New Japan Pro-Wrestling from 2016 until 2018.

At New Japan Pro-Wrestling's Wrestle Kingdom 14 on January 4, 2020, Mayu Iwatani and Arisa Hoshiki faced Hana Kimura and Giulia in a tag team dark match, marking the first women's match to take place at a Wrestle Kingdom event.

On March 5, the second Fire Pro Wrestling World collaboration was released, with Giulia, Death Yama-san, Konami, Saya Iida, Tam Nakano, Saki Kashima, Bea Priestley, AZM, Natsuko Tora, Sumire Natsu, and Saya Kamitani added to the game.

Apart from the March 8 Korakuen Hall show, Stardom canceled all remaining March shows due to the COVID-19 pandemic in Japan. No People Gate was presented from an empty Korakuen Hall on March 8, and was aired live on their YouTube channel. The next Stardom show would be the Cinderella Tournament on March 24, and was held at Korakuen Hall with a limited number of tickets sold at the door. Fans and venue staff went through temperature checks and face masks were mandatory. Additional events were canceled throughout April and May, meaning Stardom's Ota Ward Gym show and the unit-produced shows held during Golden Week in early May would no longer be taking place. In the meantime, Stardom wrestlers began doing live streams on the Stardom YouTube channel and social media to interact with fans.

On 23 May 2020, Hana Kimura committed suicide in a case investigated as cyberbullying after an incident traced to her appearance on the Fuji TV reality show Terrace House. On 16 December 2020, Osaka police announced a case is pending in the legal system with a gentleman from the area the suspect.

On August 15, 2020, Stardom canceled a Saturday show in Osaka, putting a halt to the 5-star Grand Prix, after a performer tested positive for COVID-19.

On December 20, 2020, the experience level required for the Future of Stardom Title was changed from two years to less than three years of wrestling experience.

On November 20, 2022, Stardom held a co-promoted event with sister promotion New Japan Pro-Wrestling named Historic X-Over. On July 29, Stardom and NJPW announced the IWGP Women's Championship, a title for Stardom that would be defended at NJPW events both in Japan and the United States with the inaugural champion being crowned at Historic X-Over. At the event, Kairi defeated Iwatani to become the inaugural champion.

On December 1, 2023, Taro Okada replaced Katsuhiko Harada as president.

On December 15, Stardom was announced as one of the founding members of the United Japan Pro-Wrestling alliance, a joint effort to further develop professional wrestling in Japan through promotion and organization, with Seiji Sakaguchi being named as the chairman of the project.

On February 5, 2024, it was announced that Bushiroad had fired Rossy Ogawa from the promotion due to alleged talent poaching. On 15 April 2024 Ogawa announced the creation of rival promotion Dream Star Fighting Marigold (Marigold); several members of the Stardom roster jumped ship to join Ogawa. Amongst them were Giulia, Utami Hayashishita, Mirai, Nanae Takahashi, Mai Sakurai, Yuzuki and ex-Ice Ribbon native Nao Ishikawa.

On April 23, it was announced that Stardom's sister promotion New Japan Pro-Wrestling would fully acquire the company on June 28, with Stardom becoming a subsidiary of NJPW. After the acquisition, Stardom no longer operates as Bushiroad Fight, instead being renamed to Stardom Co. Ltd.

On September 23, 2025, World Wonder Ring Stardom president Taro Okada appeared alongside Lady's Ring promoter Kounosuke Izui and Consejo Mundial de Lucha Libre (CMLL) president Salvador Lutteroth Lomelí on an episode of CMLL Informa to announce the establishment of a working relationship between World Wonder Ring Stardom promotion and the Mexico-based Consejo Mundial de Lucha Libre (CMLL).

On May 16, 2026, Stardom have joined a strategic partnership with the American promotion Major League Wrestling (MLW).

== Broadcasters ==
Domestic:

- Tokyo MX (2020, 2021–present broadcasts weekly highlights show We are STARDOM!! and live specials)
- Fighting TV Samurai (2010–present, currently broadcasting live specials, retrospective shows, and magazine shows)
- BS Nippon TV (2020–2021, currently broadcasting weekly episodes of We are STARDOM!! matches)

Worldwide:

- Stardom World (streaming service, broadcasting most Stardom shows live, as well as on-demand classic and documentary content)

== Championships ==
As of November 16, 2026

=== Stardom (Main roster) ===
==== Current ====
Championship	Current champion(s)	Reign	Date won	Days held	Location	Notes	Ref
World of Stardom Championship	Suzu Suzuki	1	June 20, 2026	149	Tokyo, Japan	Defeated Sayaka Kurara at The Conversion.	
Wonder of Stardom Championship	Hanan	1	April 26, 2026	204	Yokohama, Japan	Defeated Konami at All Star Grand Queendom.	
Goddesses of Stardom Championship	02line (AZM and Miyu Amasaki)	1	April 26, 2026	204	Yokohama, Japan	Defeated BMI2000 (Natsuko Tora and Ruaka) at All Star Grand Queendom.	
Artist of Stardom Championship	Triangle of Madness (Thekla, Julia Hart and Skye Blue)	1 (2, 1, 1)	July 18, 2026	121	Tokyo, Japan	Defeated DREAM TRINE (Hina, Ami Sohrei, and Lady C) on Night 1 of the Stardom 5 Star Grand Prix.	
High Speed Championship	Yuna Mizumori	1	December 24, 2025	327	Tokyo, Japan	Defeated Mei Seira at Year-End X'Mas Night	

=== New Blood (Development roster) ===
Championship	Current champion(s)	Reign	Date won	Days held	Location	Notes	Ref
Future of Stardom Championship	Ranna Yagami	1	March 15, 2026	246	Yokohama, Japan	Defeated Hanako during Day 5 of the Stardom Cinderella Tournament.	
New Blood Tag Team Championship	Meni☆Mani (Rian and Kikyo Furusawa)	1 (1, 1)	October 20, 2026	27	Tokyo, Japan	Defeated Sakurara (Aya Sakura and Sayaka Kurara) at Nighter in Korakuen.	

=== Shared ===
==== NJPW ====
Championship	Current champion(s)	Reign	Date won	Days held	Successful defenses	Location	Notes	Ref.
IWGP Women's Championship	Syuri	2	October 13, 2025	399	5	Tokyo, Japan	Defeated Sareee at King of Pro-Wrestling.	
Strong Women's Championship	Alex Windsor	1	March 8, 2026	253	1	London, England	Defeated Syuri at Wrestle Queendom VIII. This was a Pro-Wrestling: EVE event.	

==== CMLL ====
Championship	Current champion(s)	Reign	Date won	Days held	Location	Notes	Ref
CMLL Japanese Women's Championship	India Sioux	1	March 15, 2026	246	Yokohama, Japan	Defeated Hazuki during Day 5 of the Stardom Cinderella Tournament.	

==== Defunct ====
Championship	Final champion	Reign	Date won	Days held	Location	Notes
SWA World Championship	Mayu Iwatani	1	May 5, 2022	182	Hiroshima, Japan	She relinquished the title to focus on the IWGP Women's Championship

== Other accomplishments ==
=== Grand slam champions ===
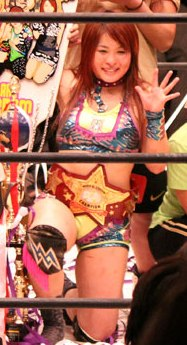
Io Shirai was the first ever Grand Slam Champion.

In Stardom, the Grand Slam consists of all the available titles promoted by the company except the developmental and shared championships. They are the World of Stardom Championship, the Wonder of Stardom Championship, the Goddesses of Stardom Championship, the Artist of Stardom Championship, and the High Speed Championship. The SWA World Championship was a part of this lineup, but became deactivated in 2022. The notion of "grand slam" officially started being mentioned on May 5, 2022, when Mayu Iwatani became the second wrestler in the company to achieve the feature after Io Shirai.

In early 2026, Starlight Kid unequivocally stated that winning the World of Stardom Championship would complete the Grand Slam for her, despite having never so much as competed for the SWA World Championship during its existence. Thus signalling its removal as a necessity. Furthermore, she specified that it would constitute a "true/complete Grand Slam", as – on top of the regular constituents – she had also previously held the Future and New Blood titles. Akin to the "Super Slam" concept in other sports (most closely resembling that of figure skating).

Text
Dates in **bold**	The date the wrestler completed the Grand Slam

Champion	Primary championship	Secondary championship	Tag team championship	Trios championship	Divisional championship	Tertiary championship (defunct)
Champion	World of Stardom Championship	Wonder of Stardom Championship	Goddesses of Stardom Championship	Artist of Stardom Championship	High Speed Championship	SWA World Championship
Io Shirai	April 29, 2013	May 17, 2015	May 6, 2015 (with Mayu Iwatani)	December 7, 2014 (with Mayu Iwatani and Takumi Iroha)	May 6, 2014	**May 21, 2016**
Mayu Iwatani	June 21, 2017	July 27, 2014	May 6, 2015 (with Io Shirai)	December 29, 2013 (with Hiroyo Matsumoto and Miho Wakizawa)	October 11, 2015	**May 5, 2022**

=== Annual tournaments ===
Tournament	Latest winner(s)	Date won	Notes
5★Star Grand Prix	Rina	August 23, 2026	Round-robin tournament with a head-to-head final match.
Cinderella Tournament	Hanan	March 15, 2026	A single-elimination tournament, where the winner gets a wish fulfilled. From 2015 to 2020 held as a One-day event.
Goddesses of Stardom Tag League	Sakurara (Aya Sakura and Sayaka Kurara)	November 30, 2025	Tag team tournament held in a round-robin format in 2011, 2012, 2014, 2016–2022, and in a single-elimination format in 2013 and 2015.
Stardom Rookie of the Year	Ema Maishima	April 11, 2026	A tournament held at the end of the year and contested between wrestlers who made their debuts during the year. Has been held in various formats; in 2011, 2012, 2015, 2016, 2024, and 2026 as a single-elimination tournament, in 2013 and 2017 as one singles match, and in 2014 as a three-way tomoe-sen match.
Triangle Derby	Abarenbo GE	January 3, 2024	A six-woman tag team tournament.

=== Pro Wrestling Illustrated ===
==== PWI Women's 100 / Women's 150 / Women's 250 ====
Since 2008, Pro Wrestling Illustrated (PWI) has published a list of top female professional wrestlers each year on the PWI Female 50, However, it wasn't until 2018 that PWI would expand their list to 100 wrestlers to include international wrestlers, Stardom included. In 2021, PWI expanded the list to 150 wrestlers. It was expanded and renamed again to Women's 250 in 2023.

Year	1	2	3	4	5	6	7	8	9	10
PWI Women's 100
2018	-	-	-	-	-	-	-	Mayu Iwatani	-	-
2019	-	-	-	-	-	-	-	-	-	-
2020	-	-	-	-	-	-	-	-	-	Mayu Iwatani
PWI Women's 150
2021	-	Utami Hayashishita	-	-	-	-	Syuri	-	Tam Nakano	-
2022	**Syuri**	-	-	-	-	-	Saya Kamitani	-	Starlight Kid	-
PWI Women's 250
2023	-	Giulia	-	-	Tam Nakano	-	-	-	-	-
2024	-	-	-	Maika	-	-	-	-	-	-
2025	-	-	Saya Kamitani	-	-	-	-	-	-	-

== See also ==
- All Japan Women's Pro-Wrestling
- New Japan Pro Wrestling
- Marvelous That's Women Pro Wrestling
- Pro Wrestling Wave
- Tokyo Joshi Pro Wrestling
- World Woman Pro-Wrestling Diana
