= Sumire Natsu =

Japanese female professional wrestler

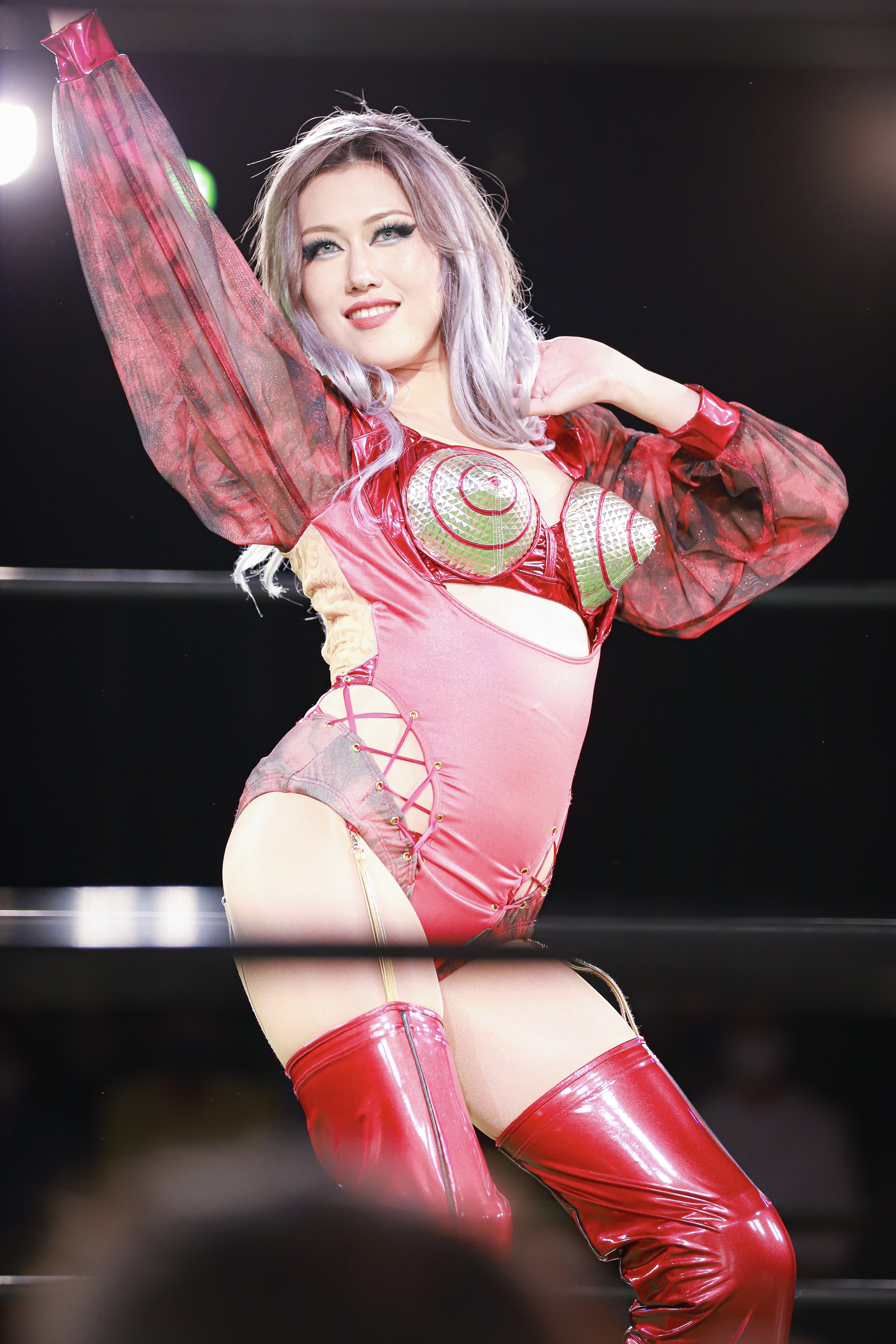
- Sumire in April 2023

Personal information
- Born: Natsuki Urabe (卜部夏紀, Urabe Natsuki); August 6, 1992 (age 34) Aichi, Japan

Professional wrestling career
- Ring name(s): Natsu Sumire; Natsuki Urabe
- Billed height: 1.64 m (5 ft 4 1/2 in)
- Billed weight: 60 kg (130 lb)
- Trained by: Pro Wrestling Wave
- Debut: October 30, 2013

Natsuki Urabe (卜部夏紀, Urabe Natsuki; born August 6, 1992) is a Japanese professional wrestler, better known by her ring name Sumire Natsu (夏すみれ, Natsu Sumire). She is currently part of the freelance group "Nomads".

Sumire is best known for her time in World Wonder Ring Stardom, where she was a part of the Oedo Tai stable. She is also known in Seadlinnng and Pro Wrestling Wave in the independent scene.

== Professional wrestling career ==
=== Pro Wrestling Wave (2013–2017) ===
On February 13, 2013, Urabe passed the Pro Wrestling Wave's auditions to become an official member of the promotion. On October 30, Urabe had her first match when she faced Kana in a losing effort.

On January 5, 2014, Urabe changed her name to Sumire Natsu, where she unsuccessfully challenged Rina Yamashita. On August 31, 2017, Natsu left Wave.

=== World Wonder Ring Stardom (2017–2021) ===
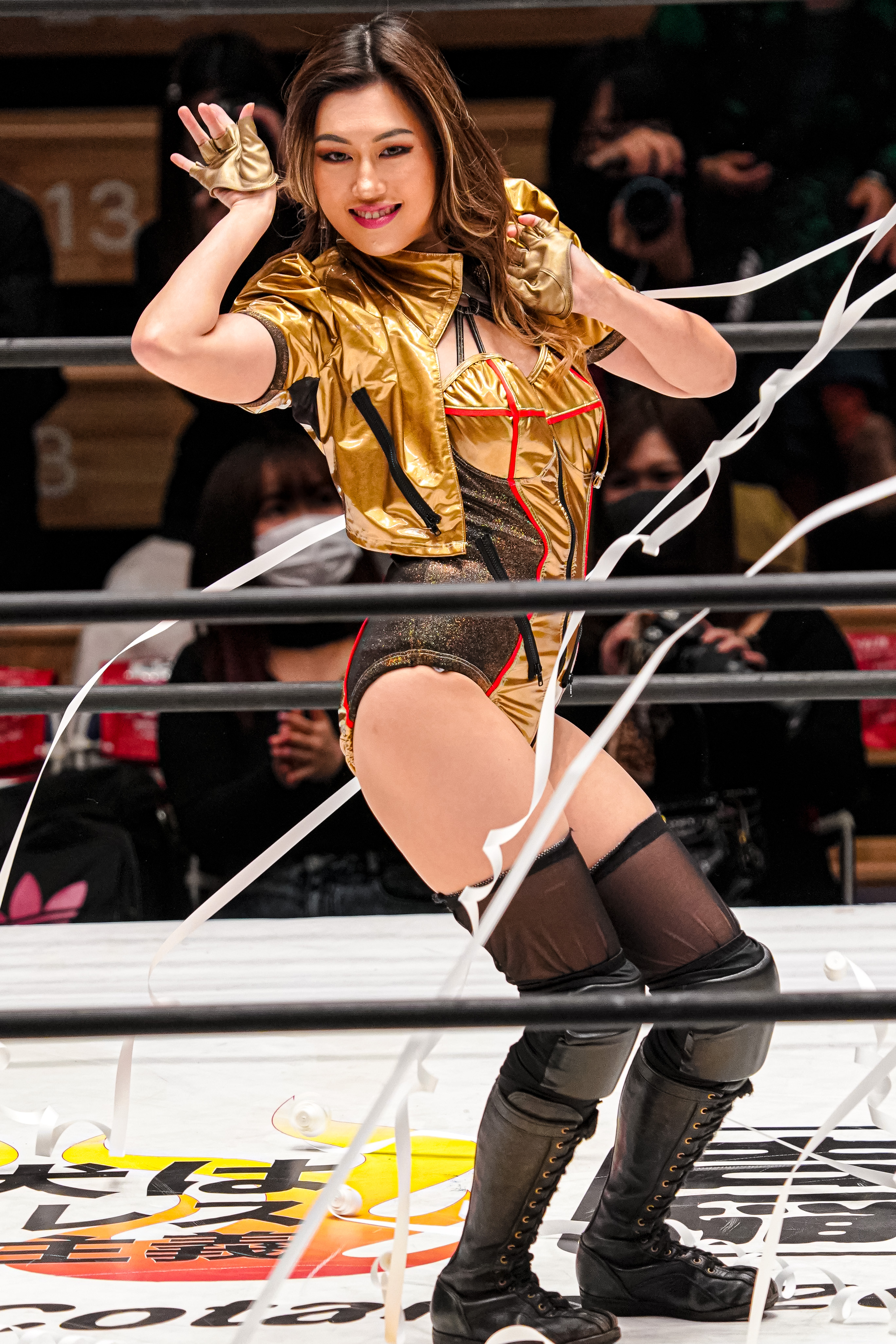
Sumire in March 2020

On November 4, 2017, Natsu was introduced to World Wonder Ring Stardom as the new villainous Oedo Tai unit. On November 12, Natsu made her in-ring debut at Stardom, where she teamed with fellow Oedo Tai members Hana Kimura, Kagetsu and Kris Wolf, as they defeated Hiromi Mimura, Konami and Team Jungle (Jungle Kyona and Natsuko Tora).

On January 21, 2018, at Stardom's 7th anniversary show at Korakuen Hall, Natsu competed at the main event in a gauntlet match between Oedo Tai and Queen's Quest, with the last wrestler defeated in the match would have to leave their faction forever. Tam Nakano, a fellow member of Oedo Tai, was the last person to be defeated in the match by Momo Watanabe, therefore, Nakano left Oedo Tai. On January 28, Natsu received her first title match, when she teamed with Kagetsu and Kimura to challenge HZK, Io Shirai and Viper for the Artist of Stardom Championship, but was unsuccessful. On June 24, Natsu teamed with recent Odeo Tai addition, Hazuki, to challenge Mayu Iwatani and Saki Kashima for the Goddesses of Stardom Championship, but were unsuccessful. On November 25, Natsu challenged Watanabe for the Wonder of Stardom Championship, but was unsuccessful. On July 20, 2019, Natsu, along with Andras Miyagi and Kagetsu, won the Artist of Stardom Championship when they defeated Stars (Iwatani, Kashima and Nakano). The Trio held the title until November 23, when they lost to AZM, Utami Hayashishita and Momo Watanabe, ending their reign at 126 days with one successful title defense.

On October 4, Natsu announced that she would be going on hiatus due to a shoulder dislocation and would be undergoing surgery to correct it. Although there was no official resignation from Stardom, Natsu's profile on Stardom's official website was removed in 2021.

=== Freelance (2022–present) ===
On February 25, Natsu announced her return to professional wrestling for May 20, 2022. She would be taking part in freelance wrestling event "Nomads" alongside Maya Yukihi, Miyuki Takase and Rina Yamashita.

== Other media ==
On August 13, 2014, Urabe released a gravure DVD, titled Lust Virgin.

== Championships and accomplishments ==
- Pro Wrestling Wave
  - Wave Tag Team Championship (1 time) – with Yuuri
  - Catch the Wave Award (1 time)
    - Special Award (2025) shared with Cherry and Risa Sera
- Seadlinnng
  - Beyond the Sea Tag Team Championship (1 time) – with Mio Shirai
- World Wonder Ring Stardom
  - Artist of Stardom Championship (1 time) – with Andras Miyagi and Kagetsu
