= Stardom Flashing Champions 2024 =

2024 World Wonder Ring Stardom event

- Promotional poster of the event
- Promotion: World Wonder Ring Stardom
- Date: May 18, 2024
- City: Yokohama, Japan
- Venue: Yokohama Budokan
- Attendance: 927

Event chronology
← Previous; All Star Grand Queendom	Next → New Blood 13

Flashing Champions chronology
← Previous; 2023	Next → —

Stardom Flashing Champions 2024 (スターダム フラッシング チャンピオンズ, Sutādamu furasshingu chanpionzu 2024) was a professional wrestling event promoted by World Wonder Ring Stardom. The event took place on May 18, 2024, in Yokohama at Yokohama Budokan.

Nine matches were contested at the event, including three on the pre-show, and two of Stardom's ten championships were on the line. The main event saw Saori Anou defeat Ami Sohrei to retain the World of Stardom Championship. In another prominent match, All Elite Wrestling's Willow Nightingale defeated Tam Nakano to retain the AEW TBS Championship.

== Background ==
=== Storylines ===
The event featured nine professional wrestling matches that resulted from scripted storylines, where wrestlers portrayed villains, heroes, or less distinguishable characters in the scripted events that built tension and culminated in a wrestling match or series of matches.

=== Event ===
The event started with three preshow confrontations broadcast live on Stardom's YouTube channel. In the first one, a returning Hina went into a time-limit draw against Ranna Yagami in singles competition, in the second one Natsupoi and Starlight Kid wrestled Suzu Suzuki and Mei Seira also into a draw, and in the third one, World of Stardom Champion Maika defeated stablemate Hanako in singles competition.

In the first main card bout, Rina, Fukigen Death and JTO's Azusa Inaba picked up a victory over two thirds of the Artist of Stardom Champions Mina Shirakawa and Xena who teamed up with stablemate Waka Tsukiyama. Next up, Momo Watanabe, Natsuko Tora and Thekla won a Gauntlet tag team match for the number one contendership for the Artist of Stardom Championship, bout which also consisted of the teams of Stars (Hazuki, Koguma and Momo Kohgo), Queen's Quest (AZM, Miyu Amasaki and Lady C), God's Eye (Syuri, Konami and Saki Kashima) and Cosmic Angels (Yuna Mizumori, Sakura Aya and Sayaka Kurara). The sixth bout saw Saya Kamitani defeating Saya Iida to secure the first defense of the High Speed Championship in that respective reign. Next up, Ice Ribbon's Tsukasa Fujimoto and Seadlinnng's Arisa Nakajima defeated IWGP Women's Champion Mayu Iwatani and one half of the New Blood Tag Team Champions Hanan in tag team competition. After the bout concluded, Fujimoto was nominated as the next challenger for Iwatani's title. In the semi main event, All Elite Wrestling's Willow Nightingale successfully defended the AEW TBS Championship against Tam Nakano.

In the main event, Saori Anou defeated Ami Sohrei to secure the third consecutive defense of the Wonder of Stardom Championship in that respective reign. After the bout ended, she received a challenge from Cosmic Angels stablemate Natsupoi.

== Results ==
No.	Results	Stipulations	Times
1^{P}	Hina vs. Ranna Yagami ended in a time-limit draw	Singles match	10:00
2^{P}	Natsupoi and Starlight Kid vs. Crazy Star (Suzu Suzuki and Mei Seira) ended in a time-limit draw	Tag team match	15:00
3^{P}	Maika defeated Hanako by pinfall	Singles match	9:41
4	Oedo Tai (Rina and Fukigen Death) and Azusa Inaba defeated Empress Nexus Venus (Mina Shirakawa, Xena and Waka Tsukiyama) by pinfall	Six-woman tag team match	13:12
5	Oedo Tai (Momo Watanabe, Natsuko Tora and Thekla) defeated Stars (Hazuki, Koguma and Momo Kohgo), Queen's Quest (AZM, Miyu Amasaki and Lady C), God's Eye (Syuri, Konami and Saki Kashima) and Sakuraramon (Yuna Mizumori, Aya Sakura and Sayaka Kurara)	Gauntlet six-woman tag team match to determine the #1 contenders to the Artist of Stardom Championship	19:43
6	Saya Kamitani (c) defeated Saya Iida by pinfall	Singles match for the High Speed Championship	11:10
7	Best Friends (Tsukasa Fujimoto and Arisa Nakajima) defeated Eye Contact (Mayu Iwatani and Hanan) by pinfall	Tag team match	21:17
8	Willow Nightingale (c) defeated Tam Nakano by pinfall	Singles match for the AEW TBS Championship	17:09
9	Saori Anou (c) defeated Ami Sohrei by pinfall	Singles match for the Wonder of Stardom Championship	24:33
(c) / – the champion(s) heading into the match; P / – the match was broadcast on the pre-show
