= Stardom All Star Grand Queendom 2024 =

2024 World Wonder Ring Stardom event

- Promotional poster for the event featuring various wrestlers
- Promotion: World Wonder Ring Stardom
- Date: April 27, 2024
- City: Yokohama, Japan
- Venue: Yokohama Buntai
- Attendance: 2,735

Pay-per-view chronology
← Previous; American Dream 2024	Next → Flashing Champions

Grand Queendom chronology
← Previous; 2023	Next → 2025

Stardom All Star Grand Queendom (スターダム オールスター グランドクイーンダム, Sutādamu ōrusutā gurandokuīndamu) was a professional wrestling event promoted by World Wonder Ring Stardom. The event took place on April 27, 2024, in Yokohama at the Yokohama Buntai.

Eleven matches were contested at the event, including three on the pre-show, and six of Stardom's ten championships were on the line. The main event saw Maika defeat Momo Watanabe in a two out of three falls match to retain the World of Stardom Championship. In other prominent matches, Saori Anou defeated Hanan to retain the Wonder of Stardom Championship, and Mayu Iwatani defeated Sareee to retain the IWGP Women's Championship.

== Production ==
=== Background ===
On October 10, 2023, during a joint Stardom and New Japan Pro-Wrestling press conference, it was announced a second All Star Grand Queendom will take place on April 27, 2024.

=== Storylines ===
The show featured eleven professional wrestling matches that result from scripted storylines, where wrestlers portrayed villains, heroes, or less distinguishable characters in the scripted events that built tension and culminated in a wrestling match or series of matches.

On March 9, 2024 at the Cinderella Tournament opening night, Sareee challenged Mayu Iwatani for the IWGP Women's Championship for All Star Grand Queendom.

On March 20, Hanan defeated Ami Sohrei to win the Cinderella Tournament, granting Hanan a "wish" which is usually a title match for a championship of the winner's choice. On March 30 at Stardom in Sendai, Hanan challenged Saori Anou for the Wonder of Stardom Championship for All Star Grand Queendom.

On April 4 at American Dream, Maika successfully defeated Megan Bayne to retain the World of Stardom Championship at the event. After the match, Momo Watanabe came to the ring and challenged for the title which Maika accepted, setting the match for All Star Grand Queendom.

=== Event ===
The first three preshow matches were broadcast live on Stardom's YouTube channel. In the first one, Momo Kohgo defeated Ranna Yagami in singles competition. In the second one, Yuna Mizumori and Sakura Aya picked up a victory over Lady C and Rian in tag team action. In the third one, Rina defeated Sayaka Kurara to secure the eighth successful defense of the Future of Stardom Championship in that respective reign.

In the first main card bout, Syuri, Konami and Ami Sohrei defeated Waka Tsukiyama, Hanako and one third of the Artist of Stardom Champions Xena in a six-woman tag team match. Next up, Saya Kamitani defeated reigning champion Saki Kashima, Saya Iida and Fukigen Death in a four-way match to win the High Speed Championship, ending Kashima's reign at 23 days, making it the third shortest ever. In the sixth bout, the confrontation between Mina Shirakawa and Natsuko Tora ended into a no-contest. After the bout concluded, Thekla returned and attacked Shirakawa to join Oedo Tai. Next up, Aja Kong and Kaoru Ito defeated Tam Nakano and Natsupoi in tag team action. In the eighth match, Suzu Suzuki and Mei Seira defeated the teams of FWC (Hazuki and Koguma), 02line (AZM and Miyu Amasaki) and YoungOED (Ruaka and Starlight Kid) in a four-way tag team match to secure the second defense of the Goddesses of Stardom Championship in that respective reign. After the bout concluded, Hazuki and Koguma challenged Seira and Suzuki again for the titles in a match which was set for May 5, 2024. Starlight Kid got kicked out of Oedo Tai as she was helped by Tam Nakano after being jumped by her ex-stablemates. Next, Mayu Iwatani defeated Seadlinnng's Sareee to secure the fifth consecutive defense of the IWGP Women's Championship in that respective reign. After the bout concluded, Ice Ribbon's Tsukasa Fujimoto made an appearance and challenged Iwatani to a bout which was furtherly scheduled as a tag team match in which Fujimoto teamed up with Arisa Nakajima and faced Iwatani and Hanan at Stardom Flashing Champions 2024. In the semi main event, Saori Anou defeated 2024 Cinderella Tournament winner Hanan to secure the second consecutive defense of the Wonder of Stardom Championship in that respective reign. After the bout concluded, Natsupoi and Ami Sohrei laid a challenge to Saori's title. The rightful contender was set to be decided on May 5, 2024.

In the main event, Maika defeated Momo Watanabe in a two out of three falls match to secure the fourth consecutive defense of the Wonder of Stardom Championship in that respective reign.

== Results ==
No.	Results	Stipulations	Times
1^{P}	Momo Kohgo defeated Ranna Yagami by pinfall	Singles match	6:11
2^{P}	Sakuradamon (Yuna Mizumori and Aya Sakura) defeated Lady C and Rian by pinfall	Tag team match	8:57
3^{P}	Rina (c) defeated Sayaka Kurara by pinfall	Singles match for the Future of Stardom Championship	8:57
4	God's Eye (Syuri, Konami and Ami Sohrei) defeated Empress Nexus Venus (Xena, Waka Tsukiyama and Hanako) by submission	Six-woman tag team match	11:49
5	Saya Kamitani defeated Saki Kashima (c), Saya Iida and Fukigen Death by pinfall	Four-way match for the High Speed Championship	6:58
6	Mina Shirakawa vs. Natsuko Tora ended in a no contest	Singles match	9:32
7	Aja Kong and Kaoru Ito defeated meltear (Tam Nakano and Natsupoi) by pinfall	Tag team match	16:59
8	Crazy Star (Suzu Suzuki and Mei Seira) (c) defeated FWC (Hazuki and Koguma), 02line (AZM and Miyu Amasaki) and YoungOED (Ruaka and Starlight Kid) by pinfall	Four-way tag team match for the Goddesses of Stardom Championship	11:17
9	Mayu Iwatani (c) defeated Sareee by pinfall	Singles match for the IWGP Women's Championship	20:26
10	Saori Anou (c) defeated Hanan by pinfall	Singles match for the Wonder of Stardom Championship	21:24
11	Maika (c) defeated Momo Watanabe score (2-1)	Two out of three falls match for the World of Stardom Championship; First fall was a regular match, the second fall a hardcore match and the final fall a Last Woman Standing match.	35:05
(c) / – the champion(s) heading into the match; P / – the match was broadcast on the pre-show

== See also ==
- 2024 in professional wrestling
- List of major World Wonder Ring Stardom events
