= Stardom Cinderella Tournament 2024 =

2024 World Wonder Ring Stardom event

- Promotional poster of the event
- Promotion: World Wonder Ring Stardom
- Date: March 9–20, 2024
- City: Yokohama, Japan (March 9); Tokyo, Japan (March 10); Himeji, Japan (March 16); Maibara, Japan (March 17); Nagoya, Japan (March 20)
- Venue: Yokohama Budokan (March 9); Korakuen Hall (March 10); Akurie Himeji Exhibition Hall (March 16); Shiga Event Hall (March 17); Nagoya Congress Center (March 20)
- Attendance: Night 1 (1,555); Night 2 (1,344); Night 3 (398); Night 4 (344); Night 5 (994); Total: 4,365

Event chronology
| ← Previous; Supreme Fight 2024 | Next → American Dream 2024 |

Cinderella Tournament chronology
| ← Previous; 2023 | Next → 2025 |

The 2024 Stardom Cinderella Tournament (スターダムシンデレラトーナメント2024, Sutādamushindereratōnamento 2024) was the tenth annual professional wrestling single-elimination tournament under the Cinderella Tournament branch of events promoted by World Wonder Ring Stardom. The event took place between March 9 and 20, 2024.

== Storylines ==
The show featured professional wrestling matches with scripted storylines, where wrestlers portray villains, heroes, or less distinguishable characters in the scripted events that built tension and culminate in a wrestling match or series of matches. The matches can be won by pinfall, submission or elimination over the top rope. A time-limit draw or a double elimination means a loss for each competitor.

== Event ==
=== Night 1 (March 9) ===
The first day of the event which took place on March 9, 2024, portraited the first-round tournament matches. The first two bouts were broadcast on Stardom's YouTube channel. In the first one, Suzu Suzuki defeated Ami Sohrei, AZM, Hazuki, Mei Seira, Mai Sakurai, Mirai and Waka Tsukiyama in an eight-way match dedicated to the bye receivers in the tournament. In the second one, Starlight Kid defeated Yuzuki in the first rounds of the tournament. A total of thirteen matches occurred, three of the ending by way of disqualification, submission and by over the top rope elimination, the rest of thirteen concluding by pinfall or submission. Besides Cinderella Tournament bouts, Rina defeated Diana's Miran to secure the seventh consecutive defense of the Future of Stardom Championship.

=== Night 2 (March 10) ===
The second day of the event portraited four tournament confrontations five tag team side matches. In the main event, Consejo Mundial de Lucha Libre (CMLL)'s Stephanie Vaquer defeated Giulia to win the Strong Women's Championship, ending the latter's reign at 249 days and nine successful defenses.

=== Night 3 (March 16) ===
The third night of the event saw four of the second round matches taking place with AZM, Ruaka, Xena and Miyu Amasaki advancing to the quarterfinals of the competition.

=== Night 4 (March 17) ===
The fourth night of the event portraited the four quarterfinal bouts from which Ruaka, AZM, Ami Sohrei and Hanan emerged victorious and moved to the semifinals of the competition.

=== Night 5 - Finals (March 20) ===
The finals night started with a preshow confrontation broadcast live on Stardom's YouTube channel in which IWGP Women's Champion Mayu Iwatani defeated Stars stablemate Yuzuki in singles competition.

In the first main card bout, Mina Shirakawa, Waka Tsukiyama, Hanako and Xena picked up a victory over Syuri, Saki Kashima, Mirai and Ranna Yagami in eight-woman tag team action. Next up, Hanan defeated Ruaka in the first semifinal bout of the tournament. In the third bout, Ami Sohrei defeated AZM in the second semifinal match. Next, Suzu Suzuki and Mei Seira and Mai Sakurai outmatched the teams of Saya Kamitani, Miyu Amasaki and Lady C, and Hazuki, Koguma and Saya Iida in three-way tag team action. After the bout concluded, FWC (Hazuki and Koguma) and Crazy Star's Suzu Suzuki and Mei Seira briefly confronted Saya Kamitani as they teased a multi-team challenge for the Goddesses of Stardom Championship. Next up, Giulia and Tam Nakano fought into a time-limit draw in one of Giulia's last matches in Stardom. Next up, Natsuko Tora, Starlight Kid, Momo Watanabe, Rina and Fukigen Death defeated Wonder of Stardom Champion Saori Anou, Natsupoi, Yuna Mizumori, Sakura Aya and Kurara Sayaka in ten-woman tag team action. In the semi main event, Hanan defeated Ami Sohrei to win the Cinderella Tournament.

In the main event, Maika defeated Utami Hayashishita to secure the second consecutive defense of the World of Stardom Championship in that respective reign. After the bout concluded, Momo Watanabe laid a challenge for Maika's title, however Maika denied Watanabe's challenge and appointed Megan Bayne as the number one contender instead, in what was seemingly set to take place at the American Dream 2024 event on April 4.

The night closed off with the ceremony of the Cinderella winner Hanan who wore the traditional Cinderella dress as well as the winner trophy.

| No. | Results | Stipulations | Times |
|---|---|---|---|
| 1^{P} | Mayu Iwatani defeated Yuzuki | Singles match | 7:46 |
| 2 | Empress Nexus Venus (Mina Shirakawa, Waka Tsukiyama, Hanako and Xena) defeated God's Eye (Syuri, Saki Kashima, Mirai and Ranna Yagami) | Eight-woman tag team match | 9:36 |
| 3 | Hanan defeated Ruaka | Cinderella tournament semi-finals match | 9:18 |
| 4 | Ami Sohrei defeated AZM | Cinderella tournament semi-finals match | 11:35 |
| 5 | Crazy Star (Suzu Suzuki and Mei Seira) and Mai Sakurai defeated Queen's Quest (Saya Kamitani, Miyu Amasaki and Lady C) and Classmates (Hazuki, Koguma and Saya Iida) | Three-way tag team match | 10:28 |
| 6 | Giulia vs. Tam Nakano ended in a time-limit draw | Singles match | 15:00 |
| 7 | Oedo Tai (Natsuko Tora, Starlight Kid, Momo Watanabe, Rina and Fukigen Death) defeated Cosmic Angels (Saori Anou, Natsupoi, Yuna Mizumori, Aya Sakura, and Sayaka Kurara) | Ten-woman tag team match | 13:05 |
| 8 | Hanan defeated Ami Sohrei | Cinderella tournament finals | 10:59 |
| 9 | Maika (c) defeated Utami Hayashishita | Singles match for the World of Stardom Championship | 29:41 |
(c) / – the champion(s) heading into the match; P / – the match was broadcast on the pre-show

== Participants ==
The tournament consisted of 24 participants, including several champions. Several competitors got walkover victories in the first rounds due to previous performances. Suzu Suzuki received her bye for winning the 2023 Grand Prix, Mirai for being the previous year Cinderella Tournament winner, Ami Sohrei, Mai Sakurai and Waka Tsukiyama for making it to the last semifinals of the previous edition, and AZM, Hazuki and Mei Seira for being picked by Stardom.

*Noted underneath are the champions who held their titles at the time of the tournament.

| Wrestler | Unit | Notes |
|---|---|---|
| Ami Sohrei | God's Eye | Artist of Stardom Champion |
| AZM | Queen's Quest | |
| Hanako | Empress Nexus Venus | |
| Hanan | Stars | New Blood Tag Team Champion; Winner |
| Hazuki | Stars | |
| Koguma | Stars | |
| Sayaka Kurara | Cosmic Angels | |
| Lady C | Queen's Quest | |
| Mai Sakurai | Unaffiliated | |
| Mei Seira | Unaffiliated | High Speed Champion |
| Mirai | God's Eye | Artist of Stardom Champion |
| Miyu Amasaki | Queen's Quest | |
| Momo Kohgo | Stars | |
| Natsuko Tora | Oedo Tai | |
| Ranna Yagami | God's Eye | |
| Ruaka | Oedo Tai | |
| Saki Kashima | God's Eye | |
| Saya Iida | Stars | New Blood Tag Team Champion |
| Starlight Kid | Oedo Tai | |
| Suzu Suzuki | Unaffiliated | |
| Waka Tsukiyama | Empress Nexus Venus | |
| Xena | Empress Nexus Venus | |
| Yuna Mizumori | Cosmic Angels | |
| Yuzuki | Stars | |

== Brackets ==
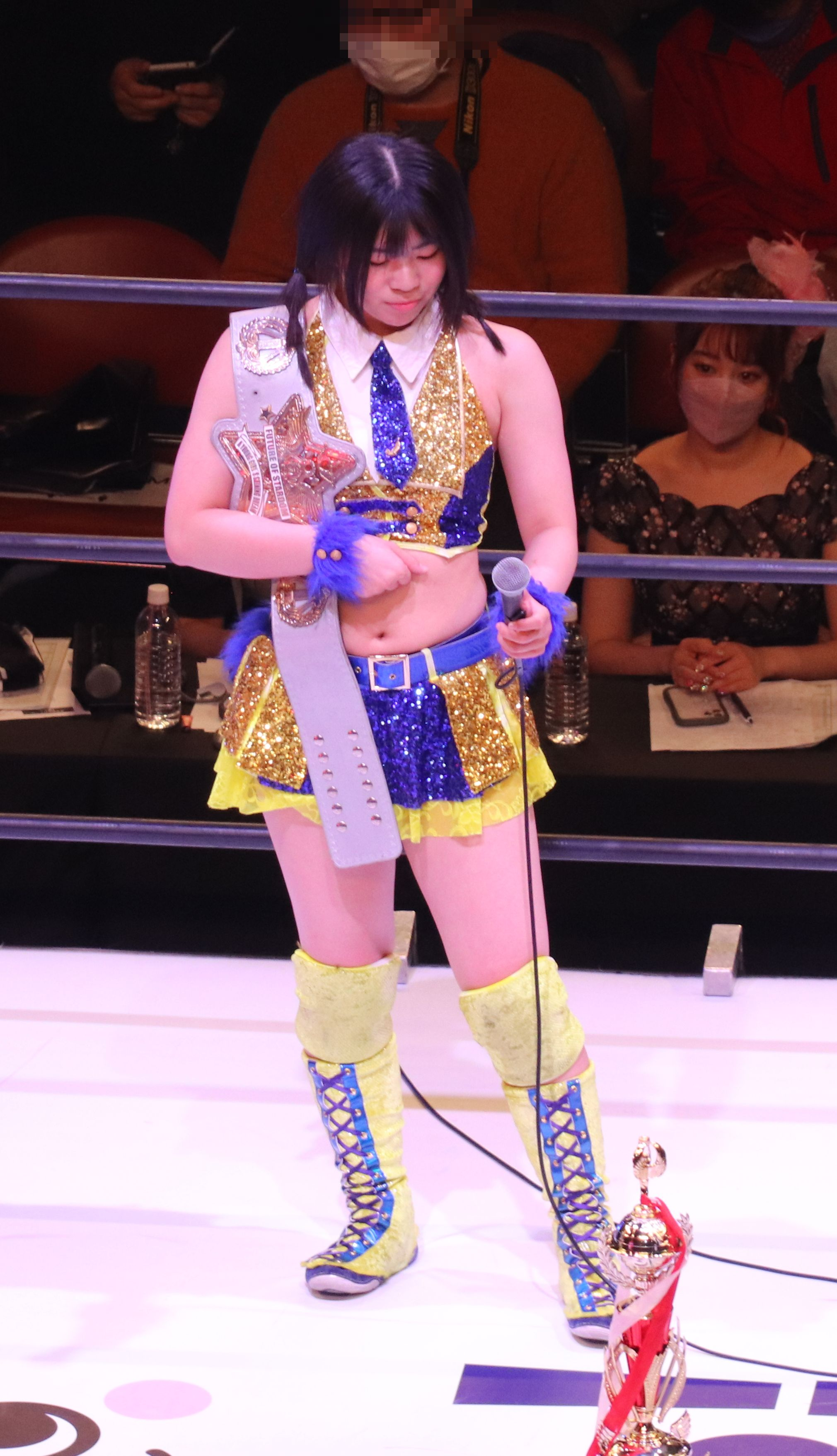
Winner of the 2024 Cinderella Tournament, Hanan.

Round 1 March 9
Hanan | Sub
Hanako | 6:30
Starlight Kid | 8:21
Yuzuki | Pin
Xena | Pin
Momo Kohgo | 3:39
Koguma | 5:16
Ruaka | Elim
Saki Kashima | 4:47
Saya Iida | Pin
Yuna Mizumori | Pin
Lady C | 5:04
Sayaka Kurara | DQ
Natsuko Tora | 3:52
Miyu Amasaki | Pin
Ranna Yagami | 4:30

Round 2 March 10, 16
Hanan | Pin
Mirai | 10:17
Starlight Kid | Elim
Suzu Suzuki | 12:36
Xena | Pin
Waka Tsukiyama | 5:32
Ruaka | Elim
Hazuki | 6:57
Saya Iida | 4:45
Mei Seira | Pin
Yuna Mizumori | 6:09
Ami Sourei | Pin
Kurara Sayaka | 7:14
AZM | Pin
Miyu Amasaki | Pin
Mai Sakurai | 6:56

Quarterfinals; March 17
Hanan | Pin
Starlight Kid | 9:27
Xena | 6:39
Ruaka | Pin
Mei Seira | 6:31
Ami Sourei | Elim
AZM | Pin
Miyu Amasaki | 8:50

Semifinals; March 20
Hanan | Pin
Ruaka | 9:18
Ami Sourei | Pin
AZM | 11:35

Final; March 20
Hanan | Pin
Ami Sohrei | 10:59
