= Stardom Flashing Champions 2023 =

2023 World Wonder Ring Stardom event

- Promotional poster of the event featuring various wrestlers
- Promotion: World Wonder Ring Stardom
- Date: May 27, 2023
- City: Tokyo, Japan
- Venue: Ota City General Gymnasium
- Attendance: 1,759

Event chronology
← Previous; New Blood 8	Next → New Blood 9

Flashing Champions chronology
← Previous; 2022	Next → 2024

Stardom Flashing Champions 2023 (スターダム フラッシング チャンピオンズ, Sutādamu furasshingu chanpionzu 2023) was a professional wrestling event promoted by World Wonder Ring Stardom. The event took place on May 27, 2023, in Tokyo at the Ota City General Gymnasium.

Nine matches were contested at the event, including two on the pre-show, and five of Stardom's nine championships were on the line. The main event saw Tam Nakano defeat Mina Shirakawa to retain the World of Stardom Championship and win the Wonder of Stardom Championship in a Winner Takes All match. In other prominent matches, the Baribari Bombers (Giulia, Thekla and Mai Sakurai) defeated REstart (Kairi, Natsupoi and Saori Anou) to win the Artist of Stardom Championship, and Saki Kashima defeated AZM and Fukigen Death in a three-way match to win the High Speed Championship.

== Production ==
=== Background ===
The show featured nine professional wrestling matches that result from scripted storylines, where wrestlers portray villains, heroes, or less distinguishable characters in the scripted events that build tension and culminate in a wrestling match or series of matches. The event's press conference took place on May 11, 2023, and was broadcast live on Stardom's YouTube channel.

Following the events from the finals night of the Stardom Cinderella Tournament 2023 from April 15 when Club Venus officially became an independent stable and splitting themselves from Cosmic Angels, Mina Shirakawa went up to the singles title image and imposed herself by winning the Wonder of Stardom Championship at All Star Grand Queendom by defeating Saya Kamitani. The event's main bout in which she will face former stablemate Tam Nakano in a double title match is served to continue their rivalry.

=== Event ===
The two preshow matches was broadcast live on Stardom's YouTube channel. In the first one, Momo Kohgo defeated Lady C and Saya Iida. In the second one, Rebel&Enemy (Ram Kaicho and Maika Ozaki) picked up a win over Syuri and Sakura Aya. In the first main card bout, Hina, Utami Hayashishita and Saya Kamitani picked up a victory over Starlight Kid, Ruaka and Rina. After some tension between Kamitani and Hayashishita which took place a couple of weeks before the match, Kamitani scored the pin, but the Queen's Quest leader walked away as soon as the match was over, leaving the status of their bond in air. In the fourth bout, Stars' Mayu Iwatani, Hanan, Hazuki and Koguma defeated Mariah May, Xena, Jessie and Waka Tsukiyama in eight-woman tag team actions. Next up, Maika, Suzu Suzuki and Mei Seira defeated Neo Stardom Army (Nanae Takahashi, Yuna Mizumori) and Hanako. The sixth bout saw Saki Kashima defeating AZM and Fukigen Death to win the High Speed Championship, ending AZM's reign at 458 days and then-time record of twelve consecutive defenses. Next up, Ami Sourei and Mirai defeated Natsuko Tora and Momo Watanabe to secure the second consecutive defense of the Goddesses of Stardom Championship in that respective reign. After the bout concluded, Oedo Tai and Queen's Quest members shared a short-lived brawl. In the semi main event, Giulia, Thekla and Mai Sakurai defeated Kairi, Natsupoi and Saori Anou to win the Artist of Stardom Championship, preventing the latter team from securing their first defense. After the bout concluded, they received a challenge from Mayu Iwatani, Koguma and Hazuki.

In the main event, Tam Nakano defeated Mina Shirakawa in a winner-takes-all match in which she successfully defended her World of Stardom Championship for the first time in that respective reign and won the Wonder of Stardom Championship to become a double champion. After the bout concluded, Nakano received a challenge for the Wonder title from 2023 Cinderella Tournament winner Mirai as she expressed her granted wish for winning the tournament.

== Results ==
No.	Results	Stipulations	Times
1^{P}	Momo Kohgo defeated Lady C and Saya Iida	Three-way match	4:44
2^{P}	Rebel&Enemy (Ram Kaicho and Maika Ozaki) defeated Syuri and Aya Sakura	Tag team match	9:41
3	Queen's Quest (Hina and AphrOditE (Utami Hayashishita and Saya Kamitani)) defeated YoungOED (Starlight Kid, Ruaka and Rina)	Six-woman tag team match	6:47
4	Stars (H&M's (Mayu Iwatani and Hanan) and FWC (Hazuki and Koguma)) defeated Club Venus (Mariah May, Xena, Jessie and Waka Tsukiyama)	Eight-woman tag team match	12:45
5	Maika, Suzu Suzuki and Mei Seira defeated Neo Stardom Army (Nanae Takahashi, Yuna Mizumori) and Hanako	Six-woman tag team match	12:03
6	Saki Kashima defeated AZM (c) and Fukigen Death	Three-way match for the High Speed Championship	5:28
7	The New Eras (Ami Sourei and Mirai) (c) defeated Gold Ship (Natsuko Tora and Momo Watanabe)	Tag team match for the Goddesses of Stardom Championship	16:05
8	Baribari Bombers (Giulia, Thekla and Mai Sakurai) defeated REstart (Kairi, Natsupoi and Saori Anou) (c)	Six-woman tag team match for the Artist of Stardom Championship	18:23
9	Tam Nakano (World) defeated Mina Shirakawa (Wonder)	Winner Takes All match for both the World of Stardom Championship and Wonder of Stardom Championship	17:43
(c) / – the champion(s) heading into the match; P / – the match was broadcast on the pre-show
