= Sayaka Kurara =

Japanese professional wrestler (born 2000)

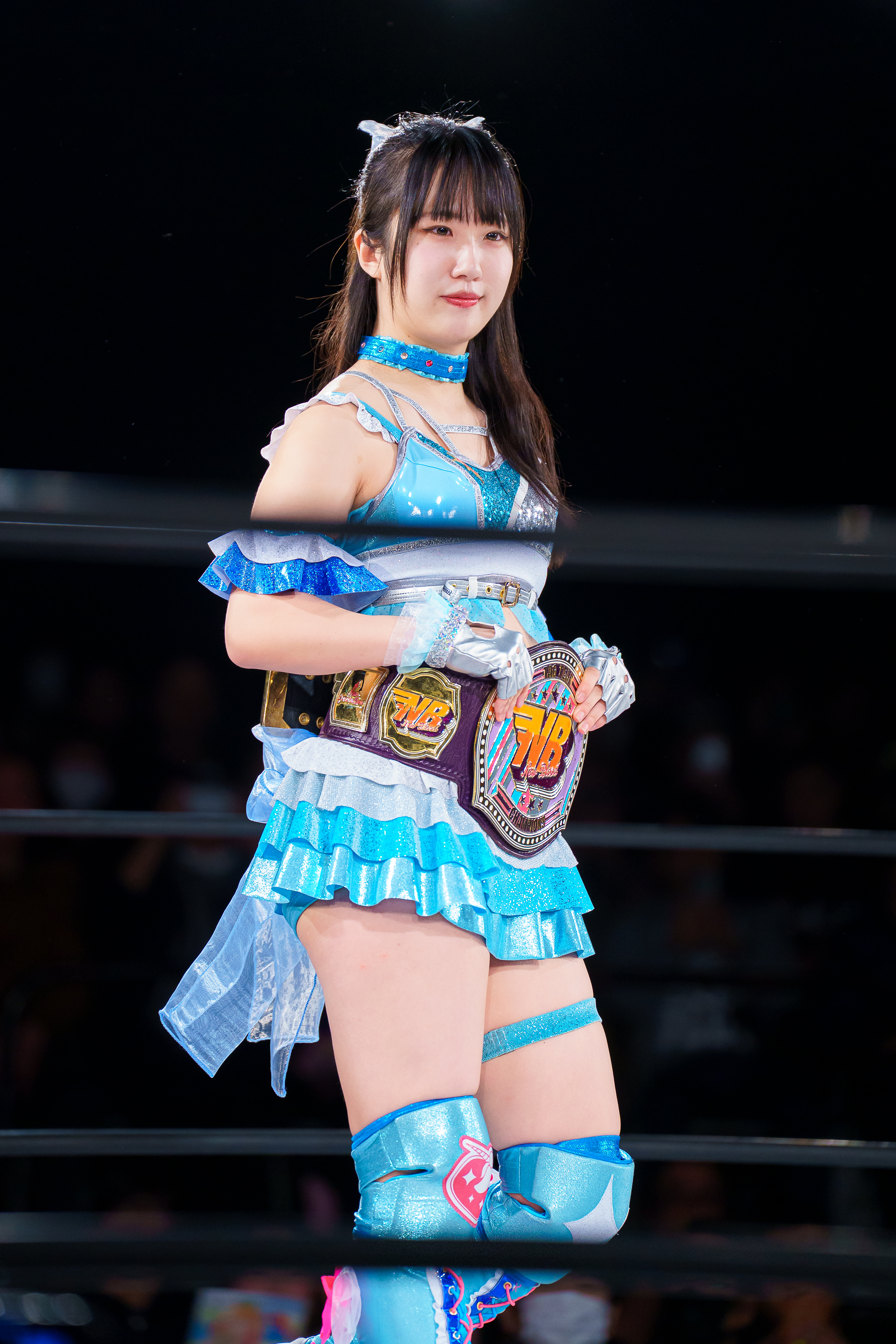
- Kurara as one half of the New Blood Tag Team Champions in January 2026

Personal information
- Born: June 20, 2000 (age 26) Toyohashi, Japan

Professional wrestling career
- Ring name: Sayaka Kurara
- Billed height: 160 cm (5 ft 3 in)
- Billed weight: 56 kg (123 lb)
- Trained by: Tam Nakano; Saya Kamitani
- Debut: 2023

Sayaka Kurara (玖麗 さやか, Kurara Sayaka; born June 20, 2000) is a Japanese professional wrestler. She is signed to World Wonder Ring Stardom, where she is the second leader of Cosmic Angels stable. She is a former World of Stardom Champion.

== Early life ==
Sayaka Kurara was born on June 20, 2000 and grew up in Toyohashi, Japan with no prior sports or athletic background. Instead, Kurara revolved more on creative arts. She participated in her school’s brass band and later moved to Tokyo to attend an art-focused school. While living in Tokyo as an art student preparing for the highly competitive entrance exams for the prestigious Tokyo University of the Arts, she attended her first professional wrestling event in late 2022. She was deeply moved by the 5★Star Grand Prix Finals match between Giulia and Tam Nakano that she decided to pursue professional wrestling. On the train ride home that very day, she had signed up for Stardom’s rookie program.

== Professional wrestling career ==
=== World Wonder Ring Stardom (2023–present) ===
==== Early career (2023–2024) ====
In March 2023, Kurara joined World Wonder Ring Stardom as a trainee. She made her official in-ring debut at New Blood 12 on December 25, 2023, where she faced Saya Kamitani. At Dream Queendom 2023 on December 29, she teamed up with Hanako and Ranna Yagami in a losing effort against Yuzuki, Miyu Amasaki, and Azusa Inaba.

At Stardom New Year Stars 2024 on January 3, she participated in the Rookie of the Year tournament, but lost against Hanako in the first round. One night later at Ittenyon Stardom Gate on January 4, 2024, she teamed up with Queen's Quest (Lady C and Hina) in a losing effort against Yuzuki, Hanako, and Yagami. On February 12, 2024, Kurara teamed with Mei Seira in a losing effort against Cosmic Angels (Tam Nakano and Yuna Mizumori). After the bout, Kurara ended up as a Cosmic Angels apprentice after Mizumori and Nakano accepted her request. After being winless for two months, she entered the Cinderella Tournament 2024. On March 8, 2024, She won against Natsuko Tora in the first round after a disqualification, making it her first ever win. Unfortunately, she was eliminated by AZM in the second round on March 16, 2024. On March 30, 2024, Kurara faced Aya Sakura in a time-limit draw.

==== Cosmic Angels (2024–present) ====
On April 12, 2024, Kurara teamed up with Sakura and Mizumori in a losing effort against Cosmic Angels (Tam Nakano, Saori Anou, and Natsupoi). After the bout, Kurara and Sakura became official members of the unit after Nakano accepted both apprentices. At All Star Grand Queendom 2024, Kurara unsuccessfully challenged Rina for the Future of Stardom Championship in her first attempt. On June 21, 2024, Sakurara (Sakura and Kurara) lost against wing★gori (Hanan and Saya Iida) for the New Blood Tag Team Championship at New Blood 13. On July 27, Kurara was defeated by her Cosmic Angels stablemate, Tam Nakano on night 1 of Stardom Sapporo World Rendezvous. On September 28, 2024, Kurara teamed up with Tam Nakano and Saori Anou to defeat H.A.T.E. (Saya Kamitani, Natsuko Tora, and Ruaka). On September 29, 2024, Kurara defeated Soy at New Blood 15. During the 2024 edition of the Goddesses of Stardom Tag League, Kurara teamed up with Nakano as Tokimeki Purin a la Mode and scored only 6 points, being unable to advance. At Year-End X'Mas Night, Kurara would then fail to capture the Future of Stardom Championship against Miyu Amasaki on her second attempt.

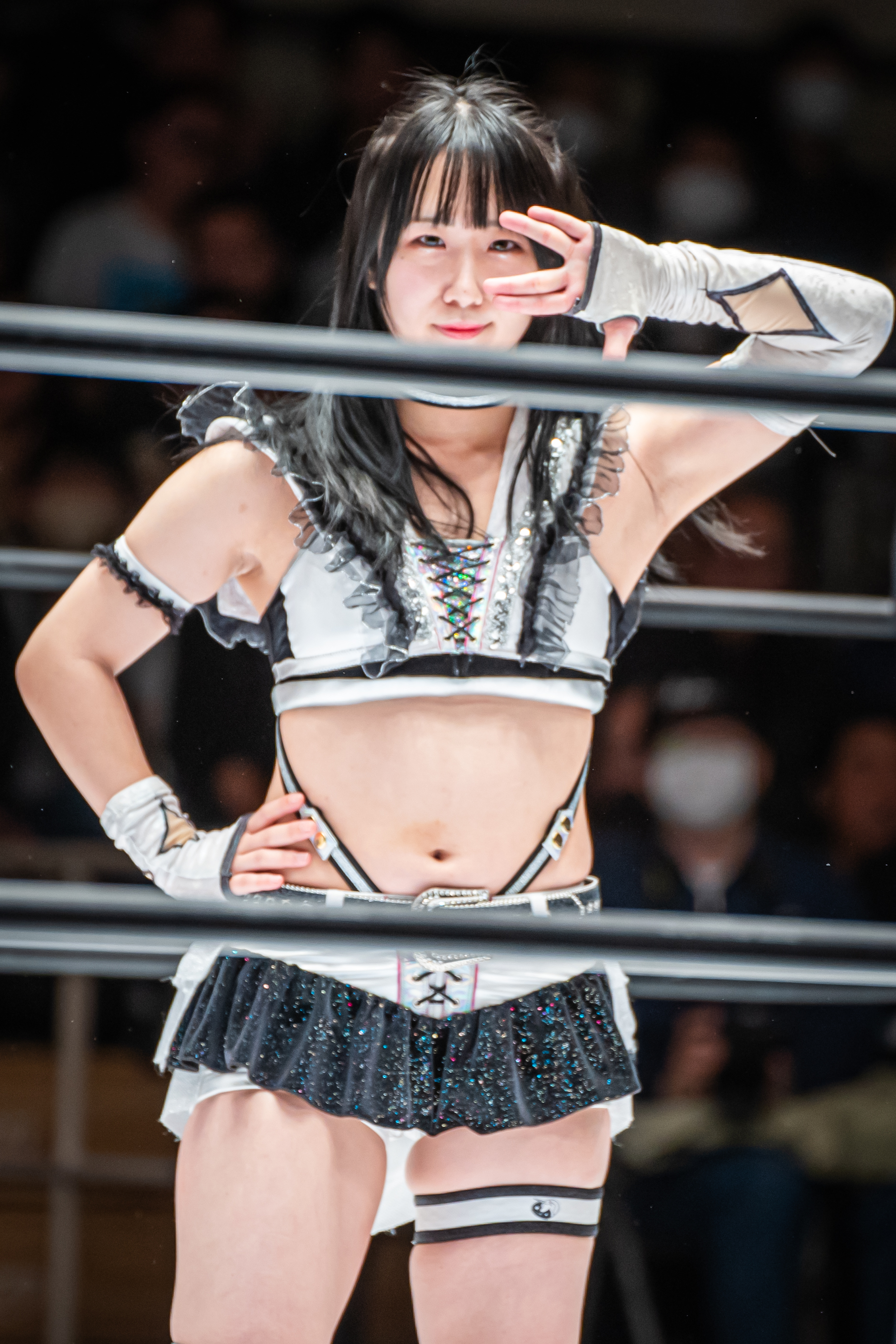
The black and white attire that Kurara is wearing was assumed to be inspired by the panda attire that Tam Nakano wore back in 2018-2019.

On Stardom New Year Dream, Kurara alongside Natsupoi and Saori Anou defeated Vulgar Alliance (Dump Matsumoto and Zap) and Natsuko Tora. At Stardom New Year Stars in Korakuen, Kurara alongside Aya Sakura and Yuna Mizumori unsuccessfully challenged their Cosmic Angels seniors Tam Nakano, Natsupoi, and Saori Anou for the Artist of Stardom Championship in a Cosmic Angels collison. On March 15, 2025, Kurara won the Stardom Cinderella Tournament 2025 after defeating Rina in the finals, but kept her wish a secret. At Stardom All Star Grand Queendom 2025, she defeated Thekla in Thekla's final match in the company. In a post-match interview she signalled her intent to challenge for the World of Stardom Championship as part of her Cinderella Tournament winner's wish. On May 10, 2025, Kurara failed to capture the World of Stardom Championship from Kamitani at Korakuen hall. At Stardom Sapporo World Rendezvous 2025, Kurara unsuccessfully challenged Hina for the Future of Stardom Championship on her third attempt. On October 30, 2025, Sakurara (Sakura and Kurara) won the New Blood Tag Team Championships by defeating Rice or Bread (Waka Tsukiyama and Hanako) at New Blood 26. On November 30, 2025, Kurara won the Goddesses of Stardom Tag League with Sakura after defeating BMI2000 (Natsuko Tora and Ruaka) in the finals. Afterwards, Kurara and Sakura would lose against Tora and Ruaka for the Goddesses of Stardom Championship at Stardom Dream Queendom 2025.

On February 2, 2026, Sakurara (Sakura and Kurara) defeated Yuna Mizumori and Anne Kanaya to retain their titles at New Blood 28. On March 15, 2026, Kurara and Natsupoi defeated H.A.T.E. (Saya Kamitani and Konami). After the bout, Kurara announced that she would put Cosmic Angels on the line for a shot at Kamitani’s World of Stardom Championship at All Star Grand Queendom 2026. On April 26, 2026, Kurara won the World of Stardom Championship by defeating Kamitani at All Star Grand Queendom 2026, thus saving her faction from disbandment. At The Conversion 2026, Kurara would lose the World of Stardom Championship to Suzu Suzuki at The Conversion, ending her reign at 55 days. On October 20, 2026, Sakurara (Sakura and Kurara) lost their titles to Meni☆Mani (Rian and Kikyo Furusawa).

== Championships and accomplishments ==
- Pro Wrestling Illustrated
  - Ranked No. 79 of the top 250 female wrestlers in the PWI Female 250 in 2025
- World Wonder Ring Stardom
  - New Blood Tag Team Championship (1 time) - with Aya Sakura
  - World of Stardom Championship (1 time)
  - Cinderella Tournament (2025)
  - Goddesses of Stardom Tag League (2025) – with Aya Sakura
  - Stardom Year-End Awards (1 time)
    - Best Unit Award (2024) as part of Cosmic Angels
