= Stardom American Dream 2024 =

2024 World Wonder Ring Stardom professional wrestling event

- Promotional poster of the event
- Promotion: World Wonder Ring Stardom
- Date: April 4, 2024
- City: Philadelphia, Pennsylvania
- Venue: 2300 Arena
- Attendance: 976

Event chronology
← Previous; Cinderella Tournament 2024	Next → All Star Grand Queendom

American Dream chronology
← Previous; First	Next → 2025

Stardom American Dream 2024 in The Keystone State was a professional wrestling event promoted by World Wonder Ring Stardom and produced by New Japan Pro-Wrestling of America. The took place on April 4, 2024, in Philadelphia, Pennsylvania, at the 2300 Arena. This was Stardom's first event in the United States since 2019.

Five matches were contested at the event, and two of Stardom's ten championships were on the line. The main event saw Maika defeat Megan Bayne to retain the World of Stardom Championship.

== Production ==
=== Background ===
The show featured five professional wrestling matches that result from scripted storylines, where wrestlers portrayed villains, heroes, or less distinguishable characters in the scripted events that built tension and culminated in a wrestling match or series of matches.

=== Event ===
The event started with the three-way bout contested for the High Speed Championship between reigning champion and one half of the Goddesses of Stardom Champions Mei Seira, Saki Kashima and Ram Kaicho solded with the victory of Kashima who won the title for the second time in her career, ending Seira's reign at 178 days and four defenses. In the second bout Momo Watanabe, Starlight Kid and Stephanie Vaquer defeated AZM, Saya Kamitani and Camron Branae in six-woman tag team competition. After the bout, AZM and Vaquer exchanged some heat ahead of their confrontation for the latter's Strong Women's Championship which was set to occur at Windy City Riot on April 12, 2024. Next up, All Elite Wrestling's Willow Nightingale and Saki defeated Syuri and Konami in tag team action. In the fourth bout, IWGP Women's Champion Mayu Iwatani, Momo Kohgo and Tam Nakano defeated one third of the Artist of Stardom Champions Mina Shirakawa, Mariah May and Xia Brookside who reunited as the old unit of Club Venus for one-night only. After the bout concluded, Toni Storm made a surprise return to Stardom to take May away of Shirakawa as the two of them shared a storyline relationship in AEW. Storm teased a possible future confrontation for the AEW Women's Championship against Shirakawa, mentioning that the "Forbidden Door" is always open. They eventually collided later that year at the Forbidden Door event, with Storm coming out successfully.

In the main event, Maika defeated former Divine Kingdom tag team partner Megan Bayne to secure the third consecutive defense of the World of Stardom Championship. Momo Watanabe stepped up as the next challenger after Maika initially denied the latter's challenge laid at Stardom Cinderella Tournament 2024.

== Results ==
No.	Results	Stipulations	Times
1	Saki Kashima defeated Mei Seira (c) and Ram Kaicho by pinfall	Three-way match for the High Speed Championship	5:04
2	Black Desire (Momo Watanabe and Starlight Kid) and Stephanie Vaquer defeated Queen's Quest (AZM and Saya Kamitani) and Camron Branae by pinfall	Six-woman tag team match	9:09
3	Willow Nightingale and Saki defeated God's Eye (Syuri and Konami) by pinfall	Tag team match	8:27
4	Stars (Mayu Iwatani and Momo Kohgo) and Tam Nakano defeated Club Venus (Mina Shirakawa, Mariah May and Xia Brookside) by pinfall	Six-woman tag team match	12:16
5	Maika (c) defeated Megan Bayne by pinfall	Singles match for the World of Stardom Championship	14:22
(c) / – the champion(s) heading into the match

== See also ==
- 2024 in professional wrestling
- List of major World Wonder Ring Stardom events
