= Stardom New Blood 13 =

2024 World Wonder Ring Stardom event

New Blood 13
- Promotional artwork of the event
- Promotion: World Wonder Ring Stardom
- Date: June 21, 2024
- City: Tokyo, Japan
- Venue: Tokyo New Pier Hall
- Attendance: 224

Event chronology
← Previous; Flashing Champions	Next → The Conversion

New Blood chronology
← Previous; New Blood 12	Next → New Blood 14

Stardom New Blood 13 (スターダム ニュー ブラッド 13, Sutādamu nyū Buraddo 13) was a professional wrestling event promoted by World Wonder Ring Stardom. The event took place on June 21, 2024, in Tokyo, Japan, at the Tokyo New Pier Hall.

Five matches were contested at the event. The main event saw wing★gori (Hanan and Saya Iida) defeat Cosmic Angels (Sakura Aya and Kurara Sayaka) to retain the New Blood Tag Team Championship.

== Production ==
=== Background ===
"New Blood" is a series of events that mainly focus on matches where rookie wrestlers, usually with three or fewer years of in-ring experience, evolve. Besides wrestlers from Stardom, various superstars from multiple promotions of the Japanese independent scene are invited to compete in bouts that are usually going under the stipulation of singles or tag team matches.

The show featured five professional wrestling matches that result from scripted storylines, where wrestlers portray villains, heroes, or less distinguishable characters in the scripted events that build tension and culminate in a wrestling match or series of matches.

=== Event ===
The entire event was broadcast live on Stardom's YouTube channel. It started with the singles confrontation between Rian and Mei Seira solded with the victory of the latter. Next up, Tomoka Inaba picked up a victory over God's Eye stablemate Ranna Yagami. The third bout saw Hanako and Ice Ribbon's Saran going into a time-limit draw. In the fourth bout, Future of Stardom Champion Rina and Professional Wrestling Just Tap Out's Azusa Inaba defeated Miyu Amasaki and Hina. After the bout concluded, Ranna Yagami stepped up to challenge Rina for the future title.

In the main event, Hanan and Saya Iida defeated Sakura Aya and Kurara Sayaka to secure the fourth consecutive defense of the New Blood Tag Team Championship in that respective reign. After the bout concluded, Hanan and Iida received a challenge from Rina and Azusa Inaba.

== Results ==
No.	Results	Stipulations	Times
1	Mei Seira defeated Rian by pinfall	Singles match	9:07
2	Tomoka Inaba defeated Ranna Yagami by pinfall	Singles match	7:46
3	Hanako vs. Saran ended in a time-limit draw	Singles match	15:00
4	Rina and Azusa Inaba defeated Queen's Quest (Miyu Amasaki and Hina) by pinfall	Tag team match	15:20
5	wing★gori (Hanan and Saya Iida) (c) defeated Sakurara (Aya Sakura and Sayaka Kurara) by pinfall	Tag team match for the New Blood Tag Team Championship	12:39
(c) / – the champion(s) heading into the match
