= Empress Nexus Venus =

Professional wrestling stable

- Final logo of the stable (2024-2026)

Stable
- Leader: Maika
- Members: Hanako; Rian; Waka Tsukiyama; Xena
- Names: Club Venus; Empress Nexus Venus
- Debut: December 29, 2022
- Disbanded: February 7, 2026
- Years active: 2022–2026

Empress Nexus Venus (エンプレス・ネクサス・ヴィーナス, En puresu Nekusasu vu~īnasu) (often stylized as ExV), formerly known as Club Venus (クラブ・ヴィーナス, Kurabu~Vīnasu), was a Japanese professional wrestling stable in World Wonder Ring Stardom. The stable was finally led by Maika, and also consisted of Hanako, Xena, Waka Tsukiyama and Rian.

== History ==
=== Cosmic Angels sub-unit (2022–2023) ===
At Dream Queendom 2, the returning Xia Brookside and the debutant Mariah May accompanied Mina Shirakawa to the ring for her match. Shirakawa and her Cosmic Angels stablemate Unagi Sayaka went on to defeat Donna Del Mondo (Mai Sakurai and Thekla) in tag team competition. Following the match, Shirakawa slapped Sayaka and announced the formation of Club Venus, a trio featuring herself, Brookside and May. Shirakawa later confirmed that Club Venus was a sub-unit of Cosmic Angels. Club Venus announced themselves as the mystery team that would compete in the Triangle Derby I. They participated in the Red Triangle Block of the tournament and scored a total of eight points, which was not enough to reach the finals.

At New Blood 7 on 20 January 2023, Brookside and May participated in the inaugural New Blood Tag Team Championship tournament, in which they lost to Karma and Starlight Kid in the quarterfinals. Brookside returned to England after wrestling in her final Stardom match on 29 January, which meant she could no longer participate as a member of Club Venus. May and Shirakawa participated in the 2023 Cinderella Tournament. On the first night of the tournament on 26 March, Xena was revealed as Club Venus' newest member before she defeated Hina in the first round. Xena performed the best out of the Club Venus members by reaching the quarterfinals, where she lost to Mirai. On 6 April, May and Xena were scheduled to team up with a mystery partner to face Stars (Hanan, Koguma and Saya Iida). On the day of the event, the mystery partner was revealed to be Jessie, formerly known as Jessi Kamea in NXT and Jessie Elaban in the independent circuit. Jessie, May and Xena ended up winning the match.

=== Club Venus (2023–2024) ===
Official logo of the stable in the Club Venus era (2023–2024).

On the final night of the 2023 Cinderella Tournament on 15 April 2023, Mina Shirakawa, Natsupoi, Saki and Tam Nakano lost to Donna Del Mondo (Giulia, Himeka, Maika and Thekla). Following the match, Shirakawa announced that Club Venus would part ways with Cosmic Angels and become an independent unit. Waka Tsukiyama was forced to either stay with Cosmic Angels or join Club Venus, to which she chose the option of Club Venus. At All Star Grand Queendom on 23 April, Shirakawa won the Wonder of Stardom Championship by defeating Saya Kamitani, ending the latter's 480-day reign which was the second longest ever at date. Shirakawa lost the title to Tam Nakano 34 days later in a Winner Takes All match where Nakano's World of Stardom Championship was also on the line. At Sunshine 2023 on 25 June, May and Shirakawa, together known as Rose Gold, won the Goddesses of Stardom Championship by defeating The New Eras. At Stardom x Stardom: Osaka Summer Team on 13 August, Rose Gold lost the Goddesses of Stardom Championship to REStart. On 30 September, May left Stardom to sign with All Elite Wrestling, and thus left Club Venus. Shirakawa announced that the only foreign member still being part of the unit at the time was Xena. At Stardom Nagoya Golden Fight 2023 on 9 October, Mina Shirakawa fell short to Syuri in an UWF Rules match. In the 2023 edition of the Goddesses of Stardom Tag League, Mina Shirakawa and Waka Tsukiyama participated in the competition under the name of "Moonlight Venus" and placed themselves in the block B where they scored a total of four points, failing to qualify into the finals. At Stardom Halloween Dark Night, a non-canon event which took place on 29 October 2023, Shirakawa and Tsukiyama fell short to Vulgar Alliance (Zap and Dump Matsumoto) in a "Zombie" Lumberjack match. At Stardom Gold Rush 2023 on 18 November, Mina Shirakawa competed in the traditional Biliken battle royal won by Billiken Death and also involving Miyu Amasaki, Megan Bayne, Maika, Yuna Mizumori and Lady C. At Stardom Nagoya Big Winter on 3 December 2023, Mina Shirakawa competed in a four-way match won by Miyu Amasaki and also involving Hanako and Yuzuki. At Stardom Dream Queendom 2023 on 29 December, Mina Shirakawa teamed up with Syuri and Mei Seira in a losing effort against 7Upp (Nanae Takahashi and Yuu) and AZM.

At Stardom New Year Stars 2024 on 3 January, Mina Shirakawa teamed up with Maika and Cosmic Angels (Saori Anou and Yuna Mizumori) in a losing effort against 7Upp (Nanae Takahashi and Yuu), Hazuki and Saki Kashima. One night later at Ittenyon Stardom Gate, Shirakawa teamed up with Mei Seira to defeat Donna Del Mondo (Mai Sakurai and Thekla) in tag team competition.

=== Empress Nexus Venus (2024–2026) ===
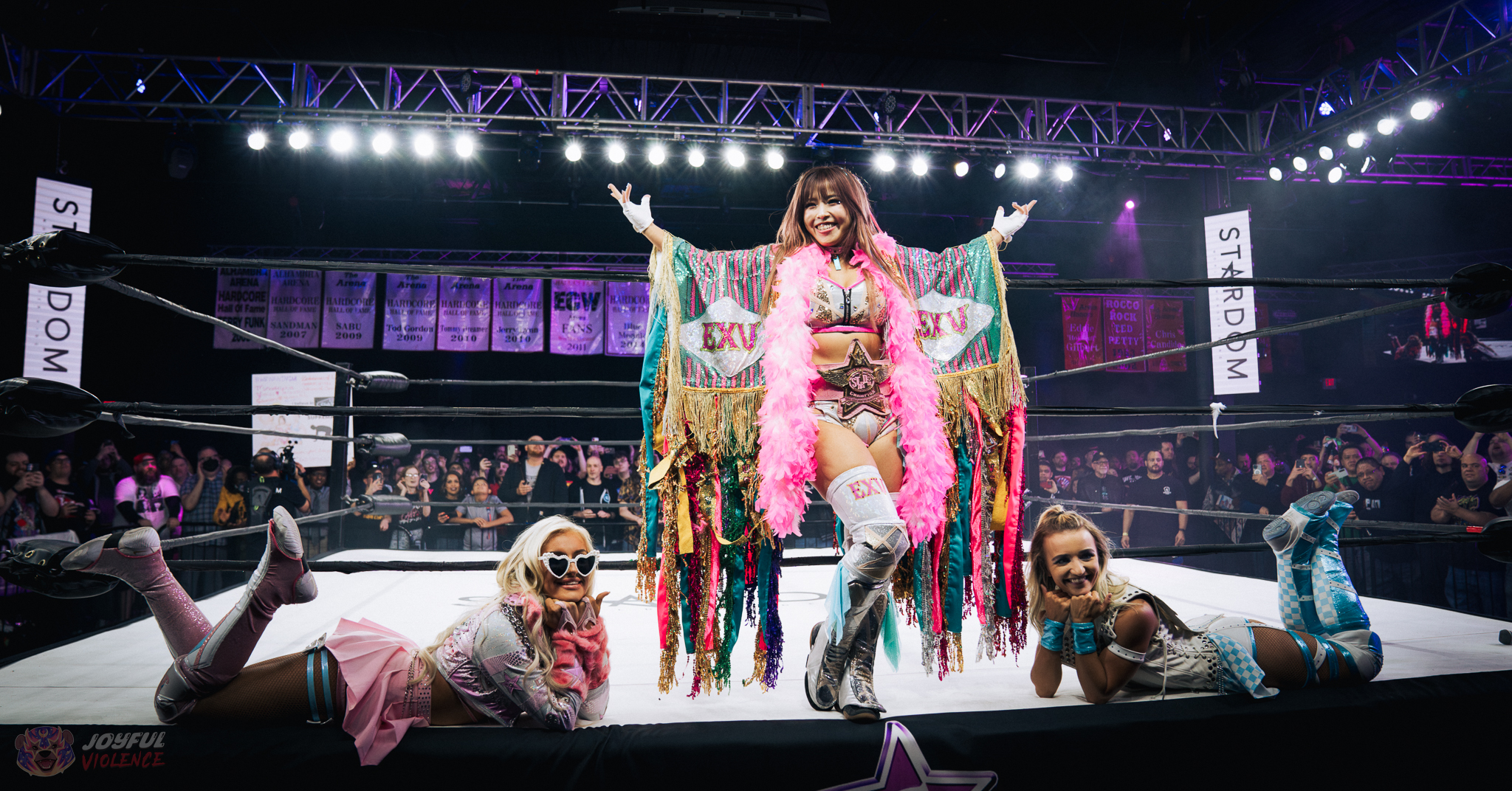
Club Venus original incarnation Mariah May, Mina Shirakawa and Xia Brookside at Stardom American Dream 2024 in April 2024.

On the first night of the 2023 Stardom Awards held on 20 January 2024, Waka Tsukiyama returned from an injury and teamed up with Mina Shirakawa in a losing effort against Maika and Hanako. After the bout concluded, Xena returned to Stardom and alongside Maika, Shirakawa, Tsukiyama and Hanako announced that they would be forming a new unit that would replace Club Venus. At New Year Stars in Sendai on 27 January 2024, Mina Shirakawa, Maika, Hanako and Waka Tsukiyama defeated Lady C, Utami Hayashishita, Saya Kamitani and AZM in an eight-woman tag team match. After picking up the victory, they announced the name of the new unit as Empress Nexus Venus (abbreviated as E Nexus V or ExV). At Stardom Supreme Fight 2024 on 4 February 2024, Shirakawa and Tsukiyama teamed up in a losing effort against Cosmic Angels (Tam Nakano and Yuna Mizumori). On 30 March, Maika, Shirakawa and Xena won the Artist of Stardom Championship by defeating Abarenbo GE. Waka Tsukiyama, Xena and Hanako represented the unit in the 2024 edition of the Cinderella Tournament with Xena scoring the best result by reaching the quarterfinals. At Stardom All Star Grand Queendom 2024 on 27 April, Xena, Waka Tsukiyama and Hanako fell short to Syuri, Konami and Ami Sohrei, Mina Shirakawa wrestled Natsuko Tora into a no-contest, and Maika successfully defended the World of Stardom Championship against Momo Watanabe in a two out of three falls match. At Stardom American Dream 2025 on 18 April, Shirakawa competed in her final Stardom match in a tag team match alongside Raychell Rose in a losing effort against Suzu Suzuki and Hazuki.

At Stardom Supreme Fight 2026, the unit disbanded after Maika, Hanako, Xena, Waka Tsukiyama and Rian fell short to Mi Vida Loca's Suzu Suzuki, Rina Yamashita, Itsuki Aoki, and Akira Kurogane as a result of a 5-on-4 handicap unit dissolution elimination match.

==== American independent circuit (2024) ====
The unit's members made their debut in the American independent scene at Stardom American Dream 2024 on 4 April, where Mina Shirakawa reunited for one night only with original Club Venus tag team partners Mariah May and Xia Brookside in a losing effort against Stars (Mayu Iwatani and Momo Kohgo) and Tam Nakano. After the bout concluded, Toni Storm made a surprise return to Stardom to take May away of Shirakawa as the two of them shared a storyline relationship in AEW. Storm teased a possible future confrontation for the AEW Women's Championship against Shirakawa, mentioning that the "Forbidden Door" is always open. On the same show, Maika successfully defended the World of Stardom Championship against former "Divine Kingdom" tag team partner Megan Bayne. At Supercard of Honor, an event promoted by Ring of Honor on 5 April 2024, Maika and Shirakawa teamed up with Mei Seira to defeat Tam Nakano and Queen's Quest (Saya Kamitani and AZM). At NJPW Strong's Windy City Riot event from 12 April 2024, Mina Shirakawa teamed up with Viva Van in a losing effort against Trish Adora and Alex Windsor. Mina Shirakawa made her All Elite Wrestling debut on 24 April 2024, where she defeated Anna Jay. Shirakawa briefly continued her short-lived feud with Toni Storm by fighting for Mariah May's friendship.

== Members ==
*	Founding member
I-II	Leader(s)

Member		Joined	Left
Mina Shirakawa	*I	December 29, 2022	April 18, 2025
Mariah May	*	December 29, 2022	September 30, 2023
Xia Brookside	*	December 29, 2022	January 29, 2023
Xena		March 26, 2023	February 7, 2026
Jessie		April 6, 2023	June 4, 2023 (Note: This was the last time Jessie performed in Stardom.)
Waka Tsukiyama		April 15, 2023	February 7, 2026
Maika	II (Note: Until 18 April 2025, Maika acted as a co-leader alongside Mina Shirakawa. Since that day which marked Shirakawa's departure from World Wonder Ring Stardom, Maika has acted as the second leader of the unit until the latter's dissolution on 7 February 2026.)	January 20, 2024	February 7, 2026
Hanako		January 20, 2024	February 7, 2026
Rian		September 19, 2024	February 7, 2026

== Sub-groups ==
Group	Members	Tenure	Type
Hai High Mate	Maika; Hanako	2024–2026	Tag team
Rice or Bread	Hanako; Waka Tsukiyama	2024–2026	Tag team
Reckless Fantasy	Waka Tsukiyama; Rian	2024–2026	Tag team
Shirakawa, May, and Brookside	Mina Shirakawa; Mariah May; Xia Brookside	2022-2023	Trio
Rose Gold	Mina Shirakawa; Mariah May	2023	Tag team
Moonlight Venus	Mina Shirakawa; Waka Tsukiyama	2023-2025	Tag team

== Championships and accomplishments ==
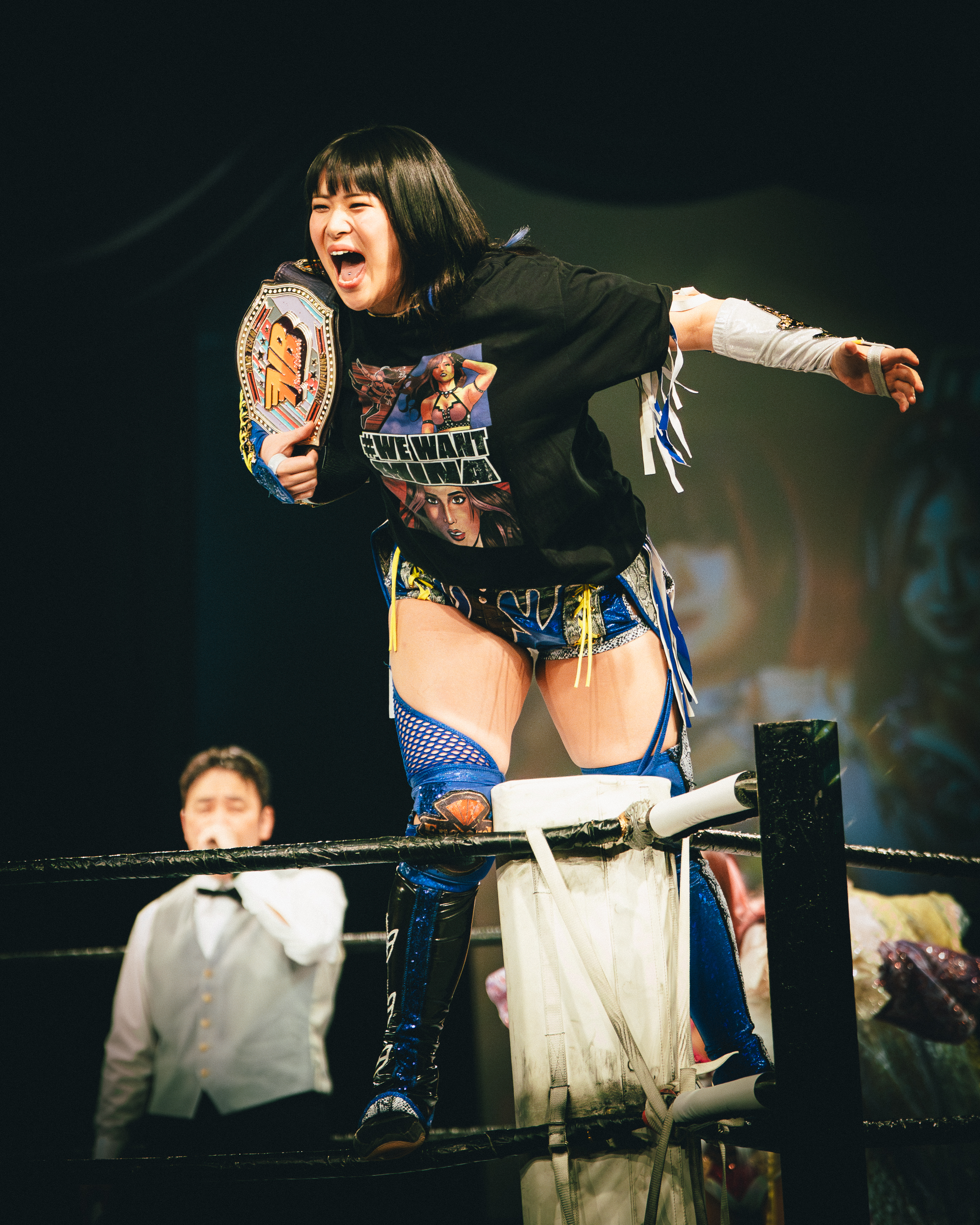
Hanako as one half of the New Blood Tag Team Champions in 2025.

- Pro Wrestling Illustrated
  - Ranked Shirakawa No. 15 of the top 250 female singles wrestlers in the PWI Women's 250 in 2024
  - Ranked Maika No. 4 of the top 250 female singles wrestlers in the PWI Women's 250 in 2024
  - Ranked Tsukiyama No. 239 of the top 250 female singles wrestlers in the PWI Women's 250 in 2023
- Revolution Pro Wrestling
  - Undisputed British Women's Championship (1 time) – Mina Shirakawa
- World Wonder Ring Stardom
  - Goddesses of Stardom Championship (1 time) – Mariah May and Mina Shirakawa
  - Artist of Stardom Championship (1 time) – Maika, Mina Shirakawa and Xena
  - Wonder of Stardom Championship (1 time) – Mina Shirakawa
  - World of Stardom Championship (1 time) – Maika
  - New Blood Tag Team Championship (1 time) – Tsukiyama and Hanako
  - Future of Stardom Championship (1 time) – Hanako
  - Stardom 5Star Grand Prix Tournament (2024) – Maika
  - 5★Star GP Awards (1 time)
    - Red Stars Best Match Award (2024) vs. Hazuki on 23 August in Red Stars A – Maika
