= High Speed Championship =

Professional wrestling women's championship

- The High Speed Championship belt

Details
- Promotion: NEO Japan Ladies Pro-Wrestling (2009–2010); World Wonder Ring Stardom (2010–present)
- Date established: May 5, 2009
- Current champion: Yuna Mizumori
- Date won: December 24, 2025

Other name
- NEO High Speed Championship
Statistics
- First champion: Natsuki☆Taiyo
- Most reigns: Natsuki☆Taiyo (4 reigns)
- Longest reign: Natsuki☆Taiyo (3rd reign, 679 days)
- Shortest reign: La Rosa Negra (18 days)
- Oldest champion: Death Yama-san (38 years, 4 months and 24 days)
- Youngest champion: Koguma (17 years, 1 month and 2 days)
- Heaviest champion: Mari Apache (70 kg (150 lb))
- Lightest champion: Riho (42 kg (93 lb))

The High Speed Championship (ハイスピード王座, Hai Supīdo Ōza) is a women's professional wrestling championship owned by the World Wonder Ring Stardom promotion. The title was originally created on May 5, 2009, in the NEO Japan Ladies Pro-Wrestling promotion, where Natsuki☆Taiyo defeated Ray to become the inaugural champion. As the name of the title suggests, it is meant for fast and high-flying wrestlers. On November 19, 2010, Stardom acquired the rights to the High Speed Championship from NEO, which had announced it would be folding after December 31. On July 24, 2011, Natsuki☆Taiyo, now affiliated with Stardom, defeated JWP Joshi Puroresu's Leon to officially bring the title over to the promotion.

== Title history ==
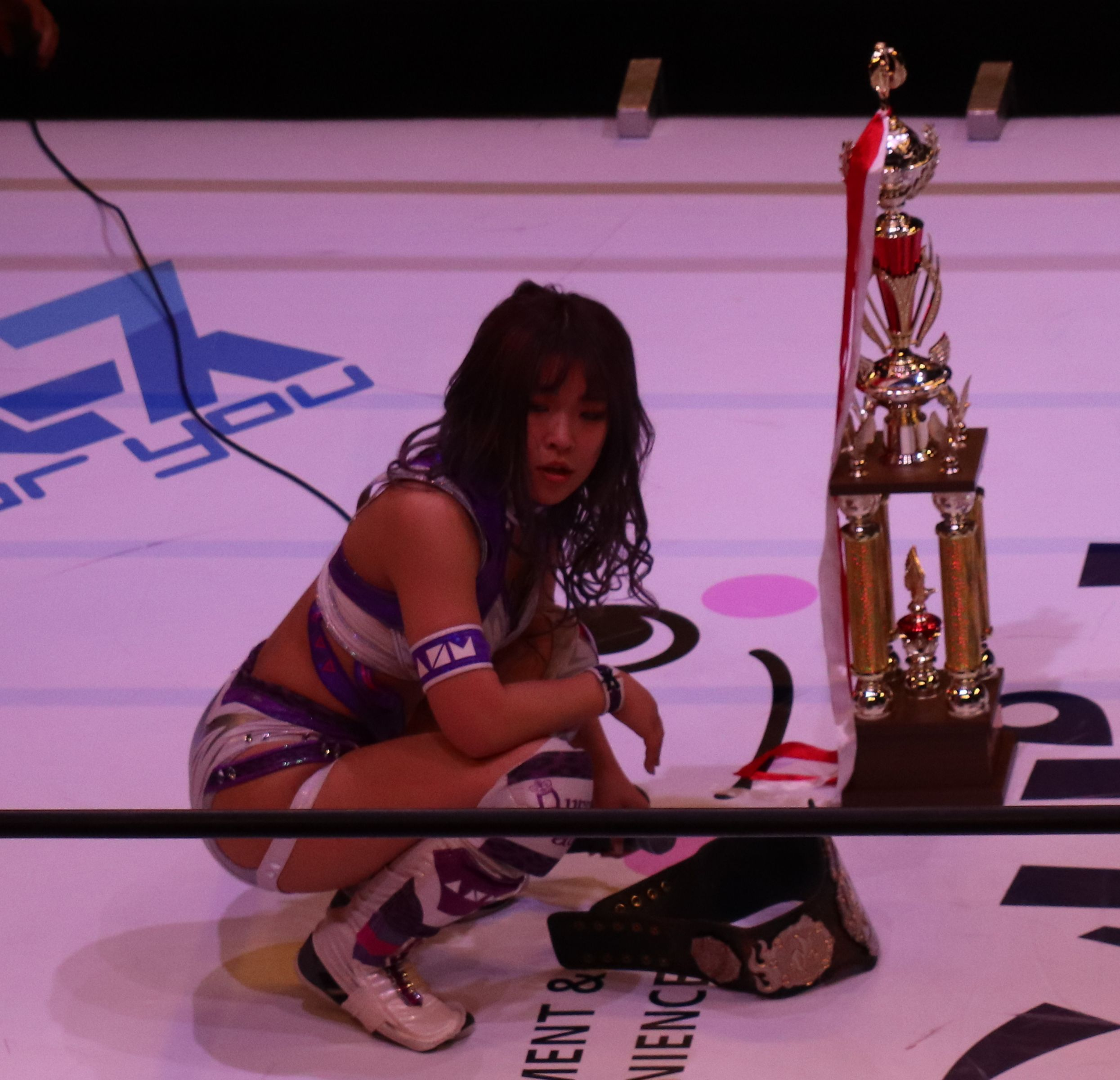
As all of Stardom's titles, the High Speed Championship is awarded to the champion with a symbolic trophy. AZM (pictured) on the second night of the Stardom World Climax 2022.

Originated in NEO Japan Ladies Pro-Wrestling, Natsuki☆Taiyo became the inaugural champion on May 5, 2009, after defeating Ray. Tetsuya Koda, NEO president, has stated that the championship was inspired after a match between Kyoko Inoue and Manami Toyota in 1994. On November 19, 2010, with the closing of NEO, Stardom acquired the rights to title.

On July 24, 2011, Taiyo won the title for the third time in her career, which was also the first time the title appeared on Stardom. The title, which was first named NEO High Speed Championship, was re-named to High Speed Championship at Stardom. Taiyo's third reign would last for 679 days, the longest reign over the championship's history. On December 29, 2013, Taiyo would also set a record for most reigns, at four.

On August 10, 2019, the inaugural AEW Women's World Champion Riho defeated the then-champion Death Yama-san, who was previously also known and held the title as Kaori Yoneyama, to win the title in a three-way match, which also involved AZM. On March 4, 2023, the 22nd champion AZM set a new record for most successful title defenses at ten by defeating Starlight Kid, who previously held the title as well.

== Belt design ==
The front plate of the championship belt was designed by Kana for NEO, a design that would carry through to Stardom.

== Reigns ==
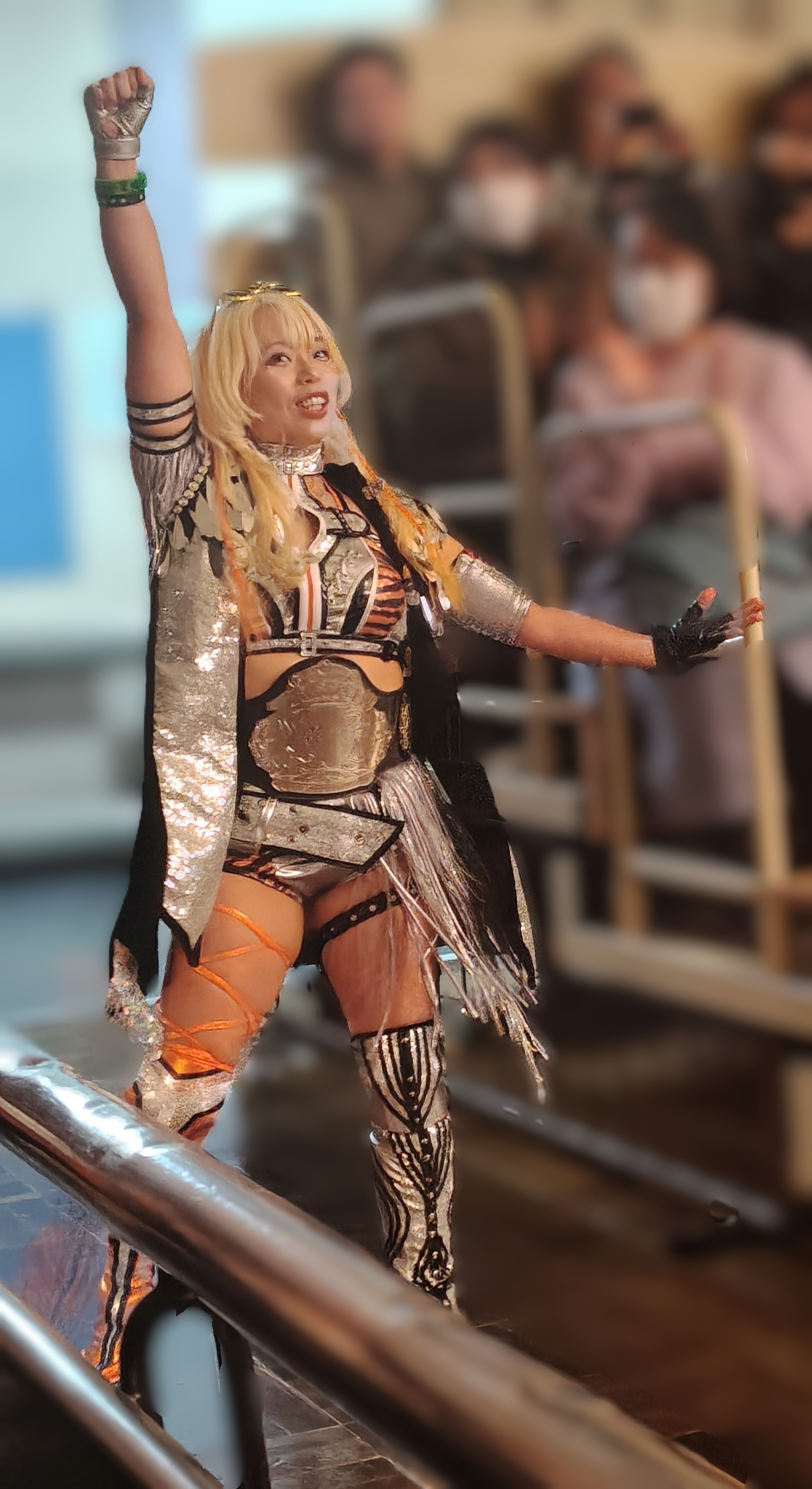
Current champion Yuna Mizumori.

As of October 12, 2026, there have been 27 reigns shared between 20 different champions. Natsuki☆Taiyo was the inaugural champion, who also holds the record for most reigns at four. Taiyo's third reign is the longest at 679 days, while La Rosa Negra's reign is the shortest at 18 days. Mari Apache is the oldest champion at 37 years old, while Koguma is the youngest at 17 years old.

Yuna Mizumori is the current champion, in her first reign. She won the title by defeating Mei Seira at Year-End X'Mas Night 2025 in Tokyo, Japan on December 24, 2025.

=== Names ===
Name	Years
NEO High Speed Championship	May 2009 – December 2010
High Speed Championship	December 2010 – present

Key
No.	Overall reign number
Reign	Reign number for the specific champion
Days	Number of days held
Defenses	Number of successful defenses
+	Current reign is changing daily

No.	Champion	Championship change			Reign statistics			Notes	Ref.
No.	Champion	Date	Event	Location	Reign	Days	Defenses	Notes	Ref.
NEO Japan Ladies Pro-Wrestling
1	Natsuki☆Taiyo	May 5, 2009	May History 09	Tokyo, Japan	1	138	2	Defeated Ray in a decision match to become the inaugural champion.	
2	Kaori Yoneyama	September 20, 2009	Beat Up 09	Tokyo, Japan	1	175	1		
3	Natsuki☆Taiyo	March 14, 2010	Road to Maniax 2010: OCC League	Kawasaki, Japan	2	258	3		
4	Leon	November 27, 2010	5Passion	Kawasaki, Japan	1	239	3		
World Wonder Ring Stardom (ST★RDOM)
5	Natsuki☆Taiyo	July 24, 2011	Stardom × Stardom 2011	Tokyo, Japan	3	679	4		
6	Kaori Yoneyama	June 2, 2013	Stardom Golden Age	Tokyo, Japan	2	210	2		
7	Natsuki☆Taiyo	December 29, 2013	Stardom Yearend Climax 2013	Tokyo, Japan	4	128	3		
8	Io Shirai	May 6, 2014	Golden Week Stars 2014	Tokyo, Japan	1	292	2		
9	Koguma	February 22, 2015	Queen's Shout 2015	Tokyo, Japan	1	84	1		
10	Star Fire	May 17, 2015	Gold May 2015	Tokyo, Japan	1	129	1		
11	La Rosa Negra	September 23, 2015	5★Star GP2015	Tokyo, Japan	1	18	0		
12	Mayu Iwatani	October 11, 2015	Appeal the Heat 2015	Tokyo, Japan	1	501	9		
13	Kris Wolf	February 23, 2017	Stardom of Champions 2017	Tokyo, Japan	1	143	4	This was a three-way match, also involving Kagetsu.	
14	Shanna	July 16, 2017	Stardom × Stardom 2017	Tokyo, Japan	1	28	0		
15	Mary Apache	August 13, 2017	Midsummer Champions 2017	Tokyo, Japan	1	498	4		
16	Hazuki	December 24, 2018	Stardom Year End Climax	Tokyo, Japan	1	208	8		
17	Death Yama-san	July 20, 2019	Stardom World Big Summer in Osaka	Osaka, Japan	3	21	0	This was a three-way match, also involving AZM. Death Yama-san was formerly known as Kaori Yoneyama.	
18	Riho	August 10, 2019	Stardom X Stardom 2019	Tokyo, Japan	1	351	1	This was a three-way match, also involving Starlight Kid.	
19	AZM	July 26, 2020	Cinderella Summer in Tokyo	Tokyo, Japan	1	220	4	This was a three-way match, also involving Starlight Kid.	
20	Natsupoi	March 3, 2021	All Star Dream Cinderella	Tokyo, Japan	1	179	2		
21	Starlight Kid	August 29, 2021	5 Star Grand Prix (Night 8)	Tokyo, Japan	1	178	5		
22	AZM	February 23, 2022	Cinderella Journey	Tokyo, Japan	2	458	12		
23	Saki Kashima	May 27, 2023	Flashing Champions	Tokyo, Japan	1	135	3	This was a three-way match, also involving Fukigen Death.	
24	Mei Seira	October 9, 2023	Nagoya Golden Fight	Nagoya, Japan	1	178	4		
25	Saki Kashima	April 4, 2024	Stardom American Dream 2024	Philadelphia, Pennsylvania	2	23	0	This was a three-way match also involving Ram Kaicho.	
26	Saya Kamitani	April 27, 2024	All Star Grand Queendom 2024	Yokohama, Japan	1	92	2	This was a four-way match also involving Saya Iida and Fukigen Death.	
27	Mei Seira	July 28, 2024	Sapporo World Rendezvous (Night 2)	Sapporo, Japan	2	514	9		
28	Yuna Mizumori	December 24, 2025	Year-End X'Mas Night 2025	Tokyo, Japan	1	292+	6		

== Combined reigns ==
As of October 12, 2026.

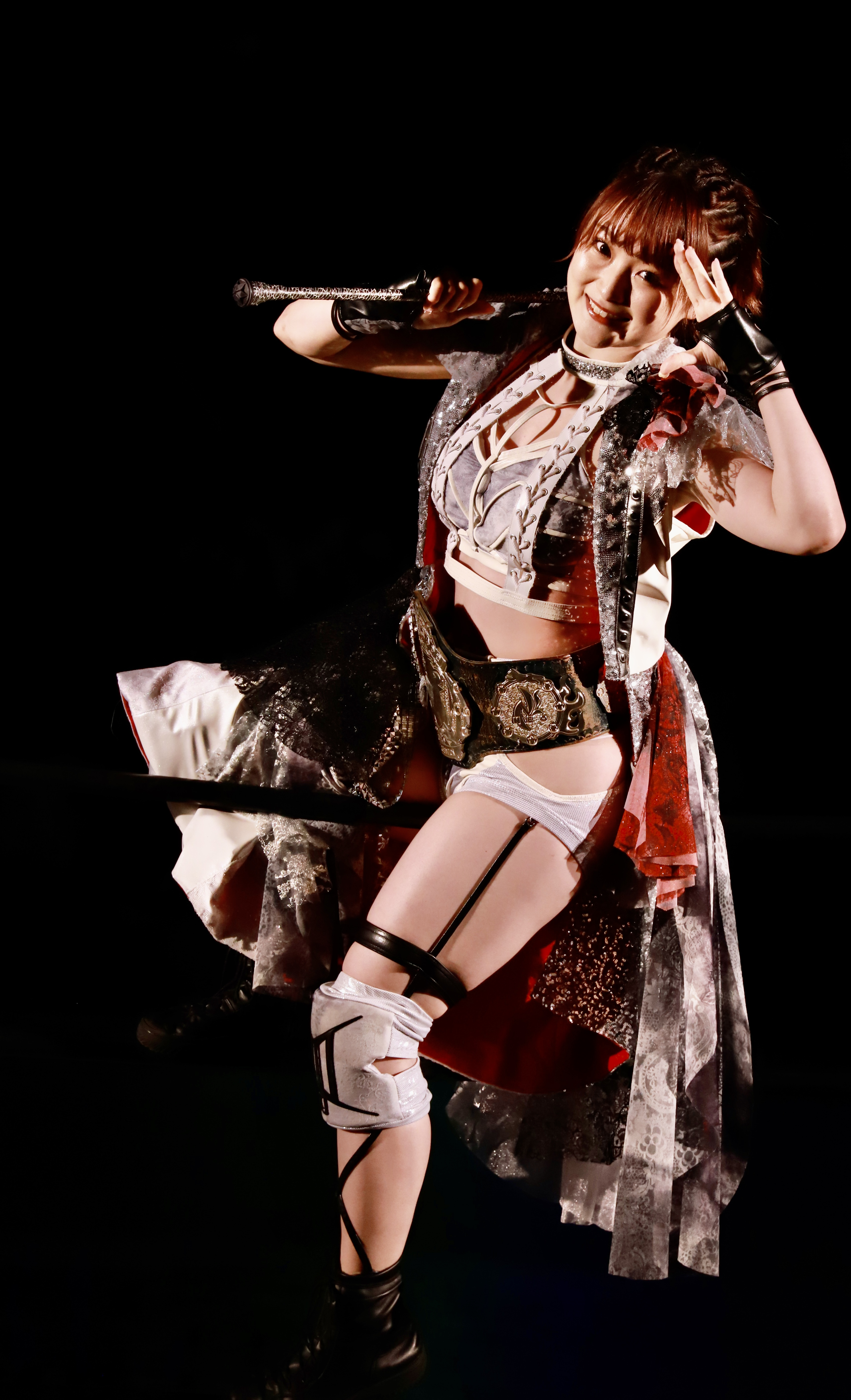
Natsupoi with the current design of the belt (2009–present)

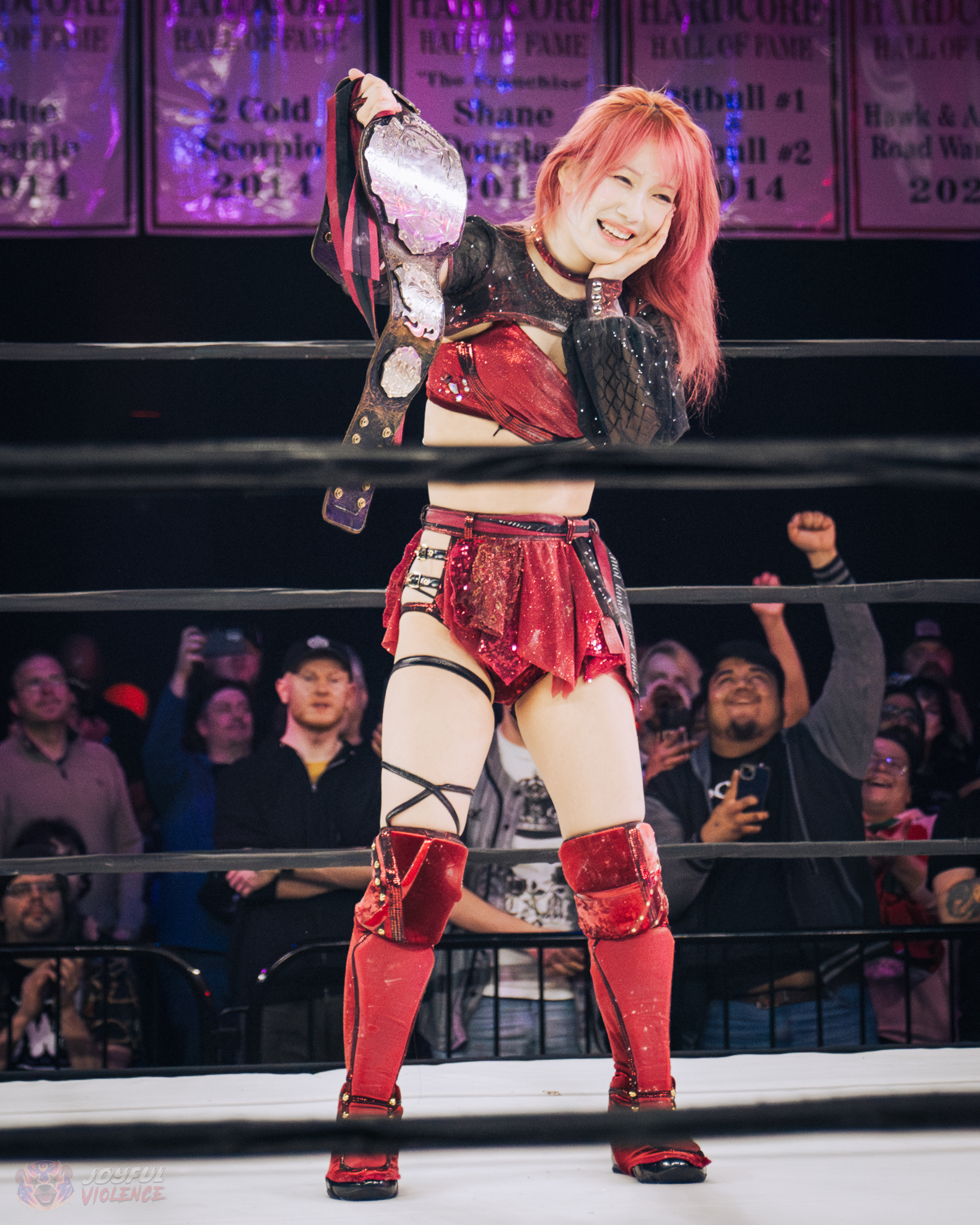
Two-time champion Saki Kashima.

†	Indicates the current champion

Rank	Wrestler	No. of reigns	Combined defenses	Combined days
1	Natsuki☆Taiyo	4	12	1,203
2	Mei Seira	2	13	692
3	AZM	2	16	678
4	Mayu Iwatani	1	9	501
5	Mary Apache	1	4	498
6	Kaori Yoneyama	3 (Note: Yoneyama wrestled under the gimmick of Death Yama-san during her third reign.)	3	406
7	Riho	1	1	351
8	Yuna Mizumori †	1	6	292+
9	Io Shirai	1	2	292
10	Leon	1	3	239
11	Hazuki	1	8	208
12	Natsupoi	1	2	179
13	Starlight Kid	1	5	178
14	Saki Kashima	2	3	158
15	Kris Wolf	1	4	143
16	Star Fire	1	1	129
17	Saya Kamitani	1	2	92
18	Koguma	1	1	84
19	Shanna	1	0	28
20	La Rosa Negra	1	0	18

== See also ==
- Sky High of Arsion Championship
- Marigold Super Fly Championship
