= Yuna Mizumori =

Japanese professional wrestler (born 1989)

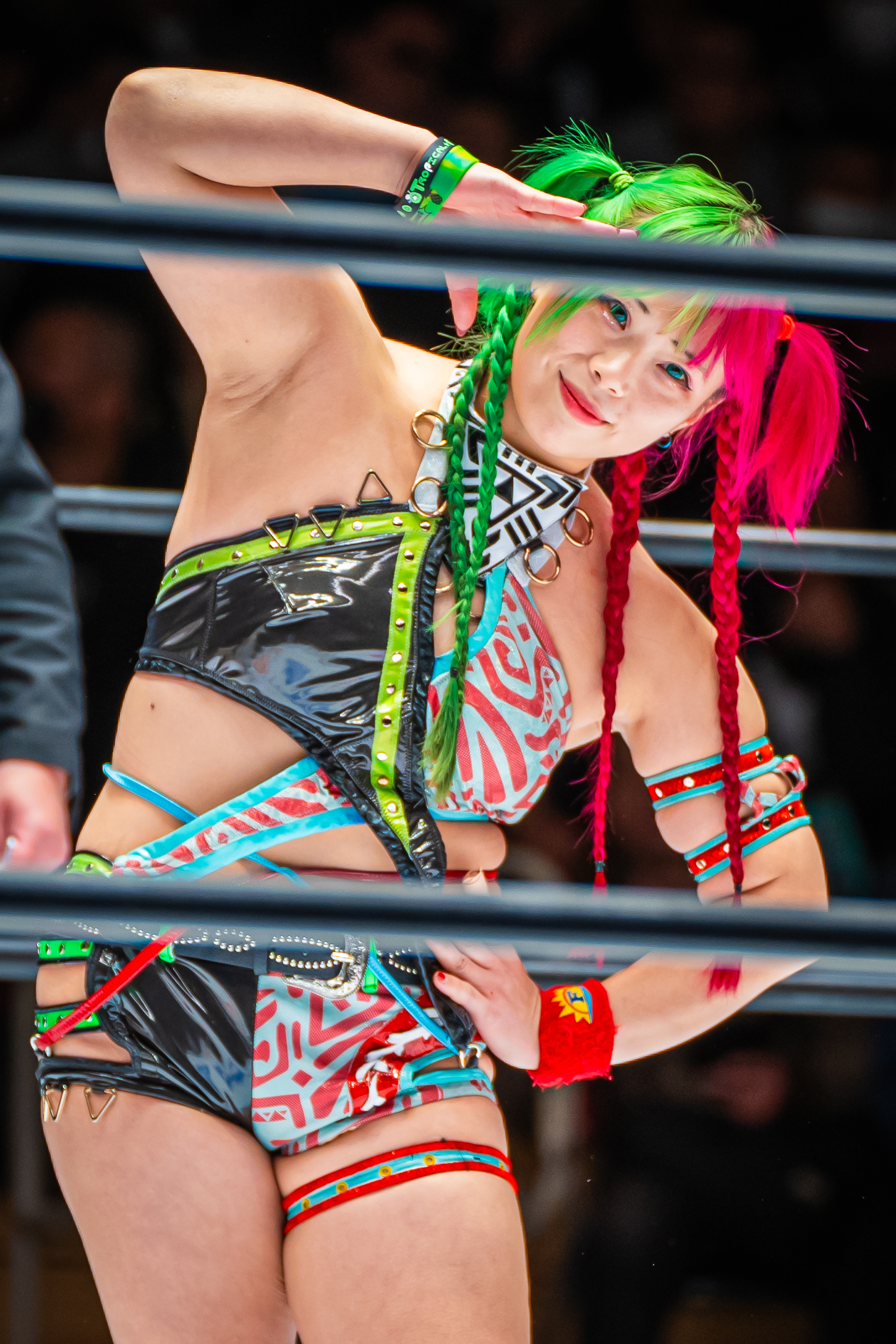
- Mizumori in January 2025

Personal information
- Born: August 2, 1989 (age 37) Kumamoto, Japan

Professional wrestling career
- Ring name: Yuna Mizumori Yunamon
- Billed height: 156 cm (5 ft 1 in)
- Billed weight: 60.5 kg (133 lb)
- Trained by: Emi Sakura
- Debut: 2018

Yuna Mizumori (水森由菜, Mizumori Yuna; born August 2, 1989) is a Japanese professional wrestler working for the World Wonder Ring Stardom, where she is the current High Speed Champion in her first reign and a member of the Cosmic Angels stable.

She is also known for her work in various promotions from the independent circuit such as Gatoh Move Pro Wrestling and Ganbare Pro-Wrestling.

== Professional wrestling career ==
=== Independent circuit (2018–present) ===
Mizumori is known for competing in various promotion of the Japanese independent scene. At SEAdLINNNG Shin-Kiba 10th NIGHT on February 28, 2019, she fell unsuccessfully challenged Nanae Takahashi for the Beyond the Sea Single Championship. At Seadlinnng Shin-Kiba Night! on October 27, 2021, Mizumori teamed up with Tokiko Kirihara and fell short to Las Fresa de Egoistas (Asuka and Makoto in a number one contendership match for the Beyond the Sea Tag Team Championship. At TJPW Inspiration #3, an event promoted by Tokyo Joshi Pro Wrestling on December 12, 2021, Mizumori teamed up with Saki in a losing effort against Magical Sugar Rabbits (Mizuki and Yuka Sakazaki). At WAVE PHASE 2 Reboot 3rd ~ NAMI 1, an event promoted by Pro Wrestling Wave on September 1, 2022, where she teamed up with Kohaku and Suzu Suzuki to defeat Haruka Umesaki, Manami and Rina Amikura as a result of a six-woman tag team match.

=== Gatoh Move Pro Wrestling (2017–2022) ===
The promotion for Mizumori is best known for competing in is Gatoh Move Pro Wrestling. She usually competes in the "Choco Pro" event division of the promotion. She made her professional wrestling debut at Gatoh Move Japan Tour #319 on October 31, 2017, while still being a trainee and competed in a 12-person costume battle royal won by Kotori and also involving Antonio Honda, Aoi Kizuki, Emi Sakura, Kazuhiro Tamura, Sayaka Obihiro and others. Mizumori has a tag team with Saki, calling themselves Tropikawild. They defeated Emi Sakura and Masahiro Takanashi at Gatoh Move Japan Tour #374 on August 21, 2018, to win the Asia Dream Tag Team Championship. At Gatoh Move ChocoPro #100 on March 27, 2021, she unsuccessfully challenged Kaori Yoneyama for the Pure-J Openweight Championship.

=== Ganbare Pro (2020–present) ===
Mizumori made her first appearance in Ganbare Pro-Wrestling on October 6, 2020, at DDT Ganbare Pro Bad Communication where she teamed up with Chris Brookes to defeat Harukaze and Shota. Ganbare was still a sub-group of DDT Pro-Wrestling by that time.

=== World Wonder Ring Stardom (2022–present) ===
Mizumori made her first appearance for World Wonder Ring Stardom on the second night of the Stardom World Climax 2022 from March 27, 2022, where she competed in a 18-women Cinderella Rumble match won by Mei Suruga and also involving various active roster members such as Unagi Sayaka, Mina Shirakawa, Lady C, Saki Kashima and others. On November 3, on Hiroshima Goddess Festival, Mizumori lost to Himeka.

==== Cosmic Angels (2023–present) ====
On Stardom New Blood 11, Mizumori was defeated by Tam Nakano in a Cosmic Angels assessment match. After the bout, Nakano praised Mizumori’s fighting spirit and accepted her into her faction. On October 4, 2023, Mizumori teamed up with Yuko Sakurai in a losing effort against Hanan and Waka Tsukiyama. At Stardom Supreme Fight 2024, Mizumori teamed up with Tam Nakano to defeat Moonlight Venus (Mina Shirakawa and Waka Tsukiyama). On December 24, 2025, Mizumori defeated Mei Seira for the High Speed Championship on her third attempt, making it her first singles title in Stardom.

== Championships and accomplishments ==
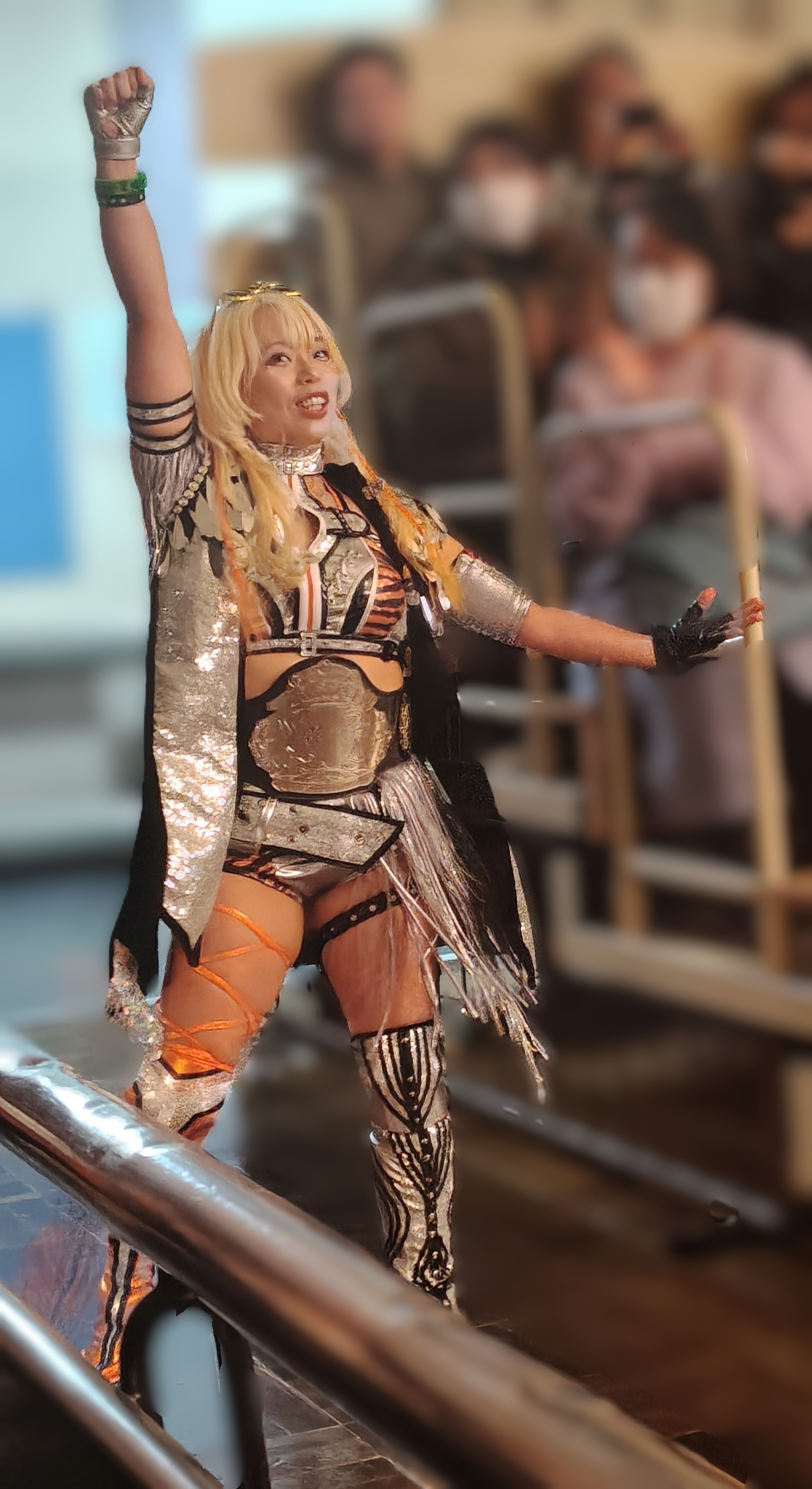
In Stardom, Mizumori is a one-time High Speed Champion.

- DDT Pro-Wrestling
  - Ironman Heavymetalweight Championship (1 time)
- Gatoh Move Pro Wrestling
  - Asia Dream Tag Team Championship (2 times) – with Saki
  - One of a Kind Tag League (2021) – with Saki
- World Wonder Ring Stardom
  - High Speed Championship (1 time, current)
  - Stardom Year-End Awards (1 time)
    - Best Unit Award (2024) as part of Cosmic Angels
