= Mei Seira =

Japanese professional wrestler

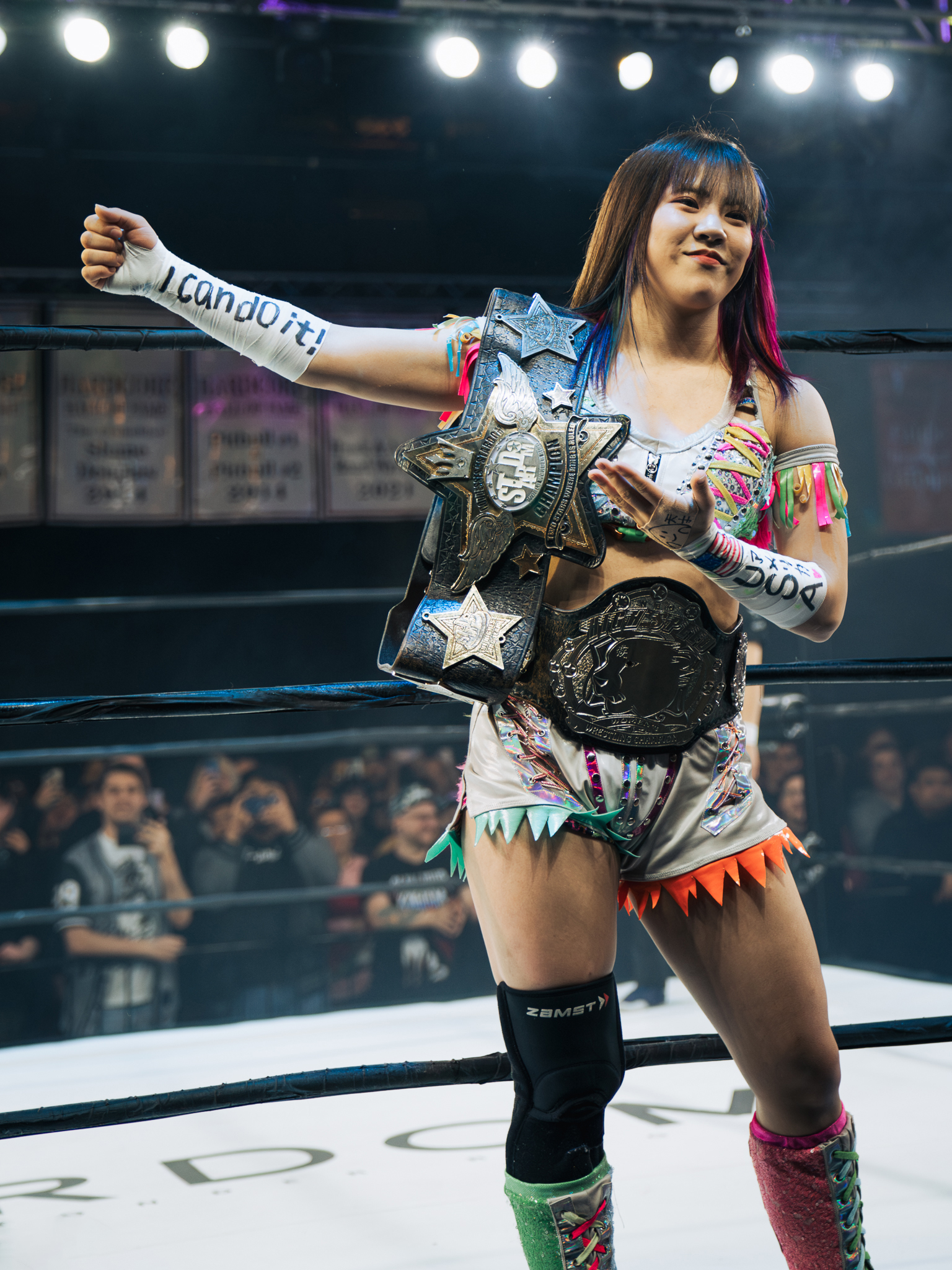
- Seira as one half of the Goddesses of Stardom Champions and the High Speed Champion in April 2024

Personal information
- Born: Mei Suzuki; April 23, 2002 (age 24) Itō, Shizuoka, Japan

Professional wrestling career
- Ring name(s): Mei Hoshizuki; Mei Seira
- Billed height: 150 cm (4 ft 11 in)
- Billed weight: 52 kg (115 lb)
- Trained by: Chigusa Nagayo
- Debut: November 18, 2018

Mei Suzuki (鈴木芽依, Suzuki Mei), better known by her ring name Mei Seira (星来芽依, Seira Mei), is a Japanese professional wrestler. She is working for World Wonder Ring Stardom, where a member of Neo Genesis and a former two-time High Speed Champion.

In Stardom, Seira is also a former one-time Goddesses of Stardom Champion. She is also known for her tenures with Marvelous That's Women Pro Wrestling and Pro Wrestling Wave.

== Professional wrestling career ==
=== Marvelous That's Women Pro Wrestling (2018–2021) ===
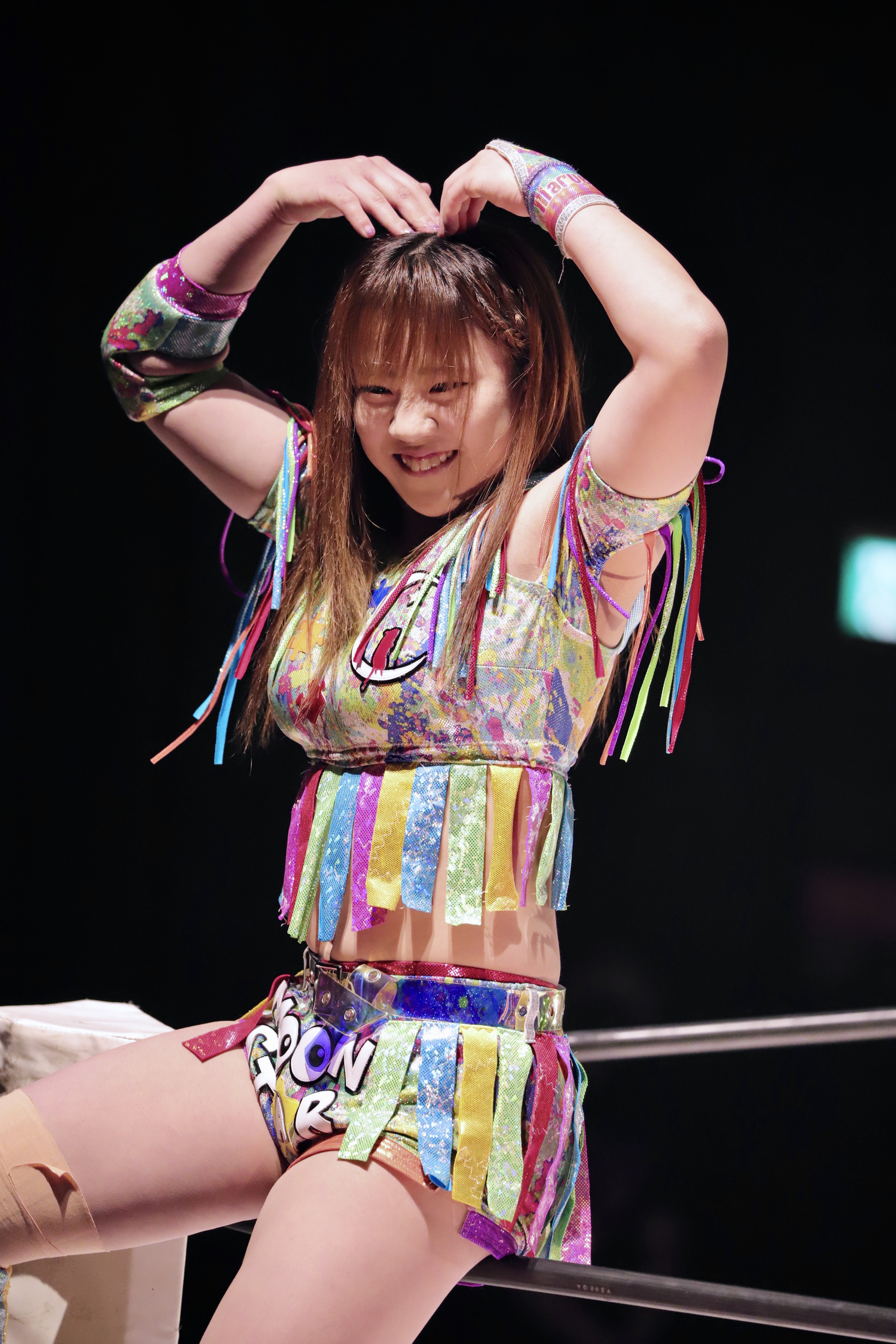
Hoshizuki in 2021

Seira made her professional wrestling debut under her real name, Mei Hoshizuki, in Marvelous That's Women Pro Wrestling at a house show from November 18, 2018, where she fell short to Tomoko Watanabe in singles competition. On the second anniversary of her debut, Seira defeated Maria and Mikoto Shindo in a three-way match. During her time in the promotion, she competed in various independent events as a Marvelous representative. At GAEAism Decade Of Quarter Century, an independent event which marked 25 years from the founding of Gaea Japan promoted on June 13, 2021, she competed in a all rights six-woman elimination tag team match in which she teamed up with Mio Momono and Rin Kadokura and fell short to Team Sendai Girls (Chihiro Hashimoto, Dash Chisako and Mika Iwata). At stake were the vacant AAAW Single Championship, AAAW Tag Team Championship, and Hashimoto's Sendai Girls World Championship and one half of her Sendai Girls Tag Team Championship. On August 31, 2021, Seira left Marvelous along with Hibiki and Mikoto Shindo. Following this, Seira went on a hiatus from professional wrestling.

=== Independent circuit (2018–2021) ===
Seira is known for competing in various promotions from the Japanese independent scene. At a house show of World Woman Pro-Wrestling Diana from September 1, 2019, she teamed up with Tomoko Watanabe in a losing effort against Crysis (Jaguar Yokota and Megumi Yabushita). At SEAdLINNNG Sparkling-d! 2019, an event promoted by Seadlinnng on October 6, she teamed up with Mei Suruga and unsuccessfully challenged Hiroyo Matsumoto and Yoshiko for the Beyond the Sea Tag Team Championship. At a house show produced by Pro Wrestling Wave on December 25, 2019, Seira teamed up with Ayumi Hayashi and Himeka Arita to defeat Haruka Umesaki, Misa Matsui and Rina Shingaki. Seira won the 2020 edition of the Jaja Uma tournament by defeating Maria in the first rounds, Yurika Oka in the second, Mikoto Shindo in the semifinals and Manami in the finals on September 22, 2020, which took place at the Sendai Girls Burning UP! event. At Sendai Girls KICK Revived on November 22, 2020, Seira defeated Manami to win the Sendai Girls Junior Championship. At WAVE Saturday Night Fever 2021 from July 24, she teamed up with Ami Miura to defeat Chie Ozora and Momo Kohgo. At Sendai Girls Road To GAEAism on October 1, 2021, due to being a Marvelous roster member, Seira teamed up with promotion mates Hibiki, Maria, Masha Slamovich, Mikoto Shindo, Mio Momono and Rin Kadokura to defeat "Team Sendai" (Chihiro Hashimoto, Dash Chisako, Kanon, Manami, Mika Iwata, Natsuho Kaneko and Yurika Oka).

=== World Wonder Ring Stardom (2020-2021) ===
Seira made her debut in World Wonder Ring Stardom on the ninth night of the 2020 5Star Grand Prix on September 28, where she teamed up with New-Tra (Rin Kadokura and Takumi Iroha) to defeat Queen's Quest (AZM, Momo Watanabe and Utami Hayashishita) in a six-woman tag team match. At Osaka Dream Cinderella 2020 on December 20, Seira unsuccessfully challenged AZM for the High Speed Championship.

At Stardom All Star Dream Cinderella on March 3, 2021, she lost a 24-women Stardom All Star Rumble involving wrestlers from the promotion's past and present.

=== Return to World Wonder Ring Stardom (2023-present) ===
At the press conference for All Star Grand Queendom on April 3, 2023, Seira announced her return to professional wrestling and that she will now be performing under the ring name Mei Seira. Seira made her in-ring return at All Star Grand Queendom on April 23, where she teamed up with Starlight Kid and defeated AZM and Mei Suruga. On April 30, Seira teamed up with Suzu Suzuki in a draw against Queen's Quest (AZM and Saya Kamitani). Following this, Seira and Suzuki would continue to frequently team with each other and later started to go by the team name Crazy Star. At Flashing Champions 2023 on May 27, Crazy Star teamed up with Maika to defeat Neo Stardom Army (Nanae Takahashi and Yuna Mizumori) and Hanako. Following this, Seira would continue to frequently team up with various members of Donna Del Mondo in tag team matches, especially Maika. On July 29, Crazy Star teamed up with Megan Bayne to defeat Stars (Koguma, Mayu Iwatani and Saya Iida, after which Seira and Bayne would continue to frequently team up. At Nagoya Golden Fight 2023 on October 9, Seira won the High Speed Championship by defeating Saki Kashima. From October 15 to November 12, Crazy Star competed in the 2023 Goddesses of Stardom Tag League. They reached the finals, where they lost to Divine Kingdom (Maika and Megan Bayne).

On March 30, 2024, Crazy Star won the Goddesses of Stardom Championship by defeating AphroditE. At American Dream 2024 on April 4, Seira lost the High Speed Championship back to Saki Kashima in a three-way match that also included Ram Kaichow. On May 5, Crazy Star lost the Goddesses of Stardom Championship to FWC.

== Championships and accomplishments ==
- Pro Wrestling Illustrated
  - Ranked No. 65 of the top 250 female wrestlers in the PWI Women's 250 in 2025
- Sendai Girls' Pro Wrestling
  - Sendai Girls Junior Championship (1 time)
  - Jaja Uma Tournament (2020)
- World Wonder Ring Stardom
  - Goddesses of Stardom Championship (1 time) – with Suzu Suzuki
  - High Speed Championship (2 times)
  - 5★Star GP Award (2 times)
    - 5★Star GP Red Stars Best Match Award (2025) vs. Saya Kamitani on August 16 in Red Stars A
    - 5★Star GP Red Stars Best Match Award (2026) vs. Rina Yamashita on July 18 in Red Stars B
  - Stardom Year-End Award (1 times)
    - Best Technique Award (2024)
