= Waka Tsukiyama =

Japanese professional wrestler

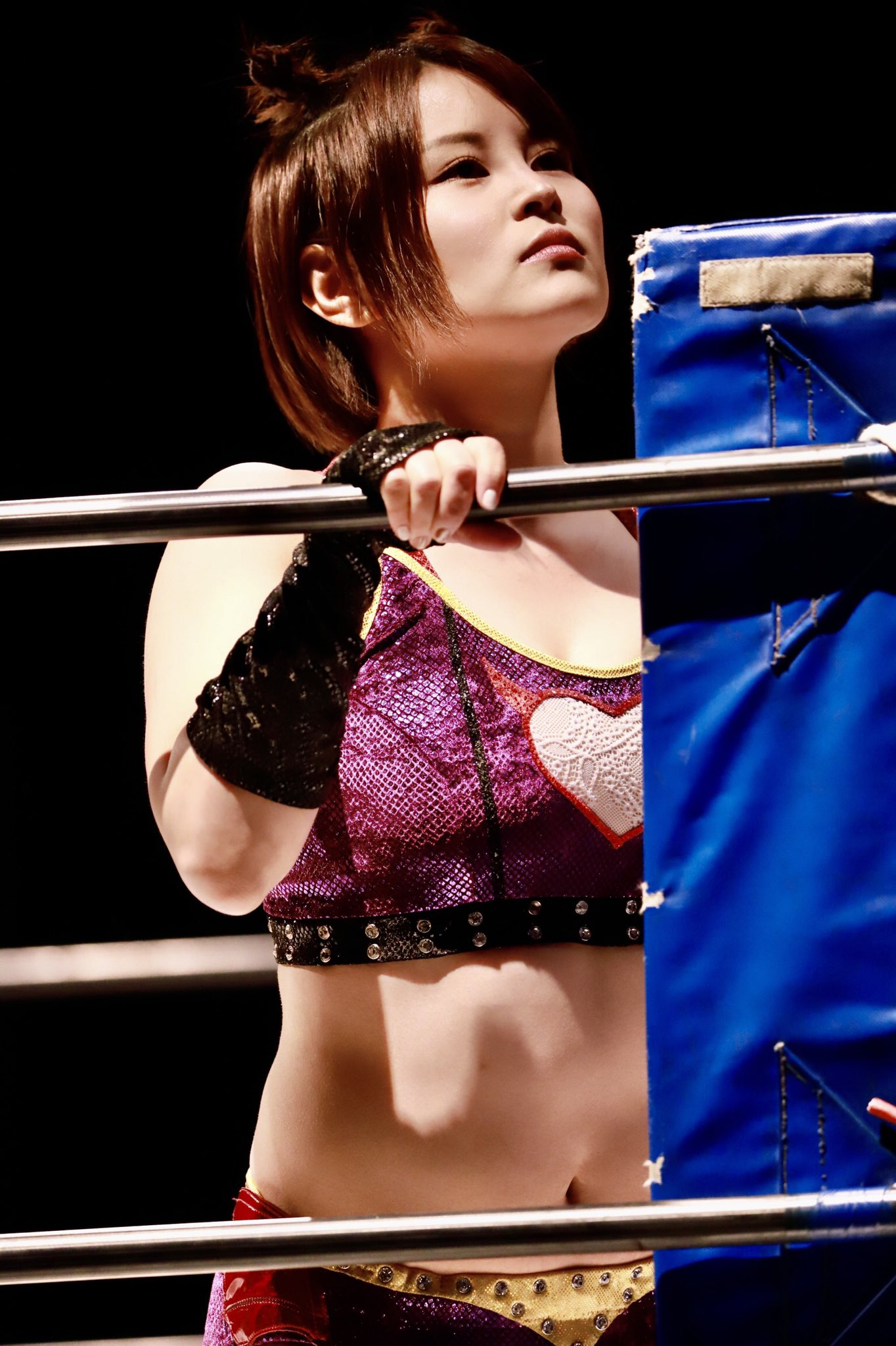
- Tsukiyama in May 2021

Personal information
- Born: January 26, 1992 (age 34) New York, United States

Professional wrestling career
- Ring name: Waka Tsukiyama
- Billed height: 153 cm (5 ft 0 in)
- Billed weight: 52 kg (115 lb)
- Debut: 2020

Waka Tsukiyama (月山 和香, Tsukiyama Waka; born January 26, 1992) is an American-born Japanese professional wrestler. She works for World Wonder Ring Stardom, where she a member of Stars.

== Professional wrestling career ==
=== Independent circuit (2020–2021) ===
Tsukiyama competed in the 2021 edition of Pro Wrestling Wave's Catch the Wave tournament where she fought in the Block B, scoring a total of three points after going against Chie Ozora, Sumika Yanagawa and Yappy. At Gatoh Move ChocoPro #114, an event promoted by Gatoh Move Pro Wrestling on May 5, 2021, Tsukiyama unsuccessfully competed against Emi Sakura. At a house show promoted by Pure-J on July 4, 2021, she fell short to Crea.

=== Actwres girl'Z (2020–2021) ===
Tsukiyama made her professional wrestling debut at AWG Color's, an event promoted by Actwres girl'Z on September 6, 2020, where she teamed up with Ayumi Hayashi in a losing effort against Saki and Sakuran Bonita.

=== World Wonder Ring Stardom (2021–present) ===
==== Cosmic Angels (2021–2023) ====
Tsukiyama made her debut in World Wonder Ring Stardom on the tenth night of the Stardom 5 Star Grand Prix 2021 on September 6 where she unsuccessfully challenged Unagi Sayaka for the Future of Stardom Championship. She was also announced to undergo a rookie "challenge" against ten different opponents, falling short in all of the bouts. On September 28, Stardom held the press conference for the Stardom 10th Anniversary Grand Final Osaka Dream Cinderella event which they broadcast live on their YouTube channel. While holding her speech for her match pairing with Lady C against Oedo Tai's Saki Kashima and Rina, Waka Tsukiyama called out Tam Nakano and requested her and the other Cosmic Angels members to join their unit which they accepted. At the pay-per-view from October 9, Tsukiyama teamed up with Lady C in a losing effort against Saki Kashima and Rina. Due to Unagi Sayaka and Mina Shirakawa starting feeling underappreciated by the leader Tam Nakano and due to doubting Sakurai and Tsukiyama the newcomers, tensions raised in the Cosmic Angels unit in November 2021, aspect which led to inner clashes between stablemates. At Kawasaki Super Wars, the first event of the Stardom Super Wars trilogy from November 3, 2021, Tsukiyama unsuccessfully challenged stablemate Mai Sakurai in which had Sakurai lost, she must have left the Cosmic Angels unit. At Tokyo Super Wars on November 27, 2021, Tsukiyama unsuccessfully challenged Ruaka and Mai Sakurai in a three-way match for the Future of Stardom Championship. At Osaka Super Wars from December 18, 2021, she teamed up with Mai Sakurai and Lady C to unsuccessfully challenge Syuri in a 3-on-1 handicap gauntlet match. Tsukiyama competed in the 2021 edition of the Goddesses of Stardom Tag League where she teamed up with Lady C as "C Moon", fighting in the Blue Goddess Block and scoring no points.

At Stardom Nagoya Supreme Fight on January 29, 2022, Tsukiyama was scheduled to team up with Mai Sakurai and Momo Kohgo to face Oedo Tai (Fukigen Death, Starlight Kid and Saki Kashima), but the match was canceled due to Sakurai's and Tsukiyama's bad health condition.

==== Club Venus (2023–2024) ====
On April 15, 2023, Tsukiyama left Cosmic Angels to join Club Venus. On September 25, it was announced that Tsukiyama would be producing MOONDOM, a Stardom event that focuses on support for an English-speaking audience in Japan and features wrestlers from other Japanese women's professional wrestling promotions.

==== Empress Nexus Venus (2024–2026) ====
On January 20, 2024, Tsukiyama, Hanako, Maika, Mina Shirakawa and Xena reformed Club Venus into a new stable, later given the name Empress Nexus Venus.

== Championships and accomplishments ==
- Pro Wrestling Illustrated
  - Ranked No. 239 of the top 250 female singles wrestlers in the PWI Women's 250 in 2023
- World Wonder Ring Stardom
  - New Blood Tag Team Championship (1 time) — with Hanako
