= Koguma =

Japanese professional wrestler

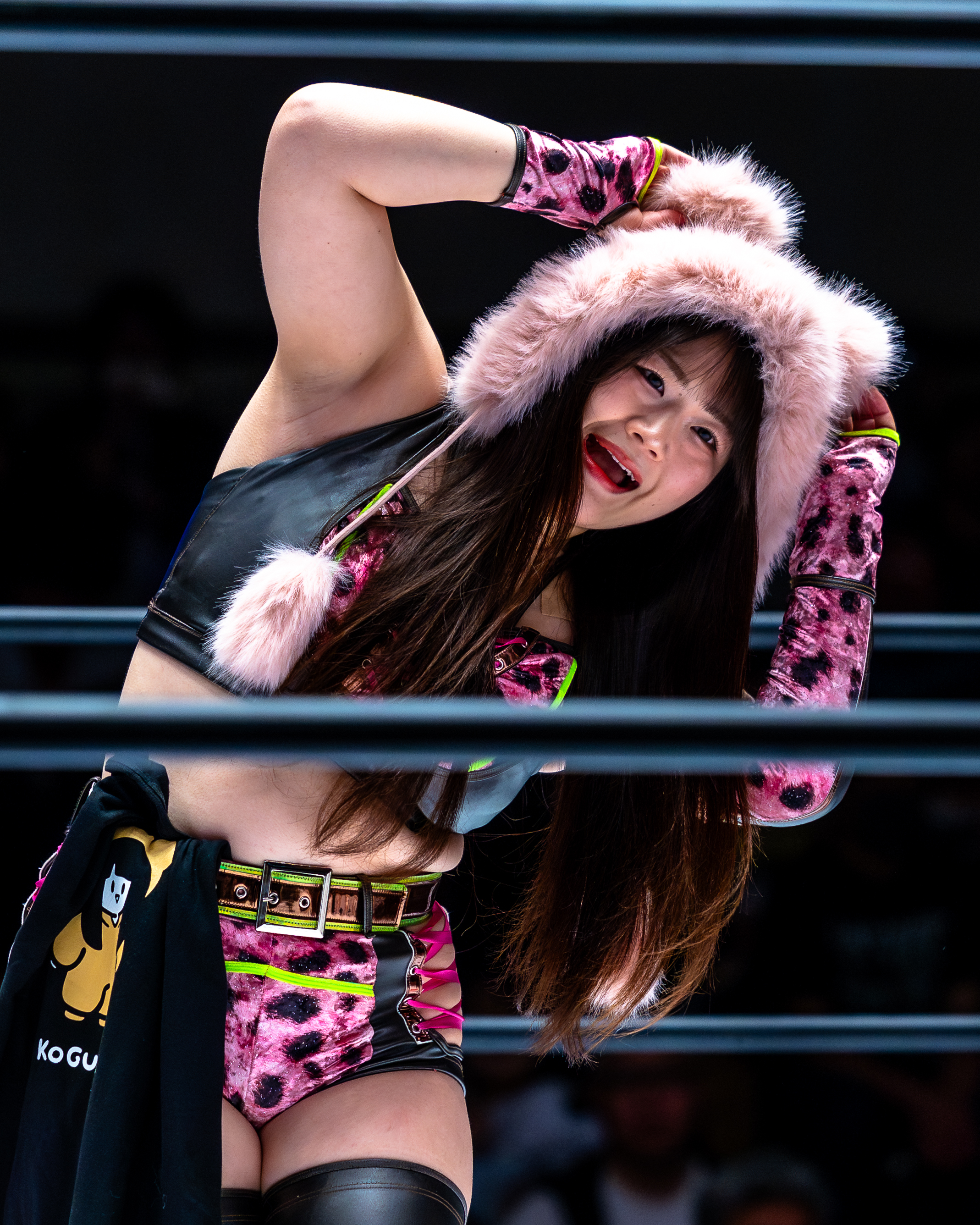
- Koguma in April 2026

Personal information
- Born: January 20, 1998 (age 28) Fukuoka, Japan

Professional wrestling career
- Ring name(s): Koguma; Osita
- Billed height: 150 cm (4 ft 11 in)
- Billed weight: 60 kg (132 lb)
- Trained by: Fuka Kakimoto
- Debut: November 4, 2013

Koguma (コグマ, Koguma; born January 20, 1998) is a Japanese professional wrestler. She currently works for World Wonder Ring Stardom.

Koguma is a former three-time Goddesses of Stardom Champion, one-time Artist of Stardom Champion, and one-time High Speed Champion. Koguma is one of the winners of the 2021 Goddesses of Stardom Tag League.

== Professional wrestling career ==
=== World Wonder Ring Stardom (2013–2015) ===
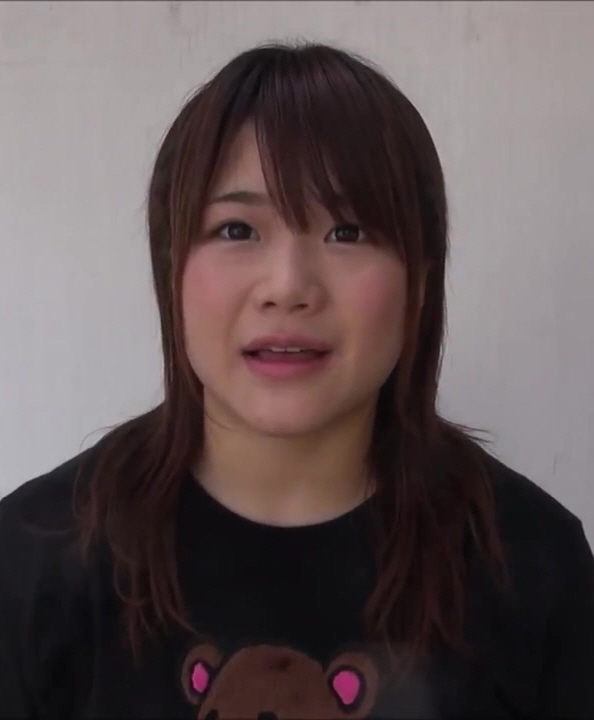
Koguma in August 2014

Koguma made her professional wrestling debut at a World Wonder Ring Stardom event on the November 4, 2013, where she unsuccessfully challenged Natsuki Taiyo in a singles match. Koguma got her first notable victory on March 30, 2014, where she won a 14-person battle royal. At the 2014 Goddesses of Stardom Tag League, Koguma teamed up with Miho Wakizawa and fought in the Blue block, where they scored a total of two points. Koguma lost the High Speed Championship to Star Fire on May 17, 2015, which was her last match before retiring from professional wrestling.

=== Independent circuit (2014) ===
Koguma worked in a couple of matches for Sendai Girls' Pro Wrestling, one of them taking place on April 18, 2014 at a house show of the promotion where she teamed up with Nanae Takahashi in a losing effort to Meiko Satomura and Sareee.

=== Return to Stardom (2021–present) ===
Koguma returned to professional wrestling after a six-year hiatus at All Star Dream Cinderella on March 3, 2021, where she participated in a 24-women Stardom All-Star rumble match.

==== STARS (2021–2025) ====
On the second night of the 2021 Cinderella Tournament on May 14, Koguma saved Mayu Iwatani from an attack performed by Oedo Tai after Iwatani's match. Koguma was later revealed to have joined Iwatani's stable, Stars. At Yokohama Dream Cinderella 2021 in Summer on July 4, Koguma teamed up with Mayu Iwatani and unsuccessfully challenged Alto Livello Kabaliwan for the Goddesses of Stardom Championship. At the 2021 5 Star Grand Prix, Koguma fought in the Red Stars block and scored a total of 11 points. At Tokyo Super Wars on November 27, Koguma unsuccessfully challenged Starlight Kid for the High Speed Championship. At Osaka Super Wars on December 18, Koguma teamed up with Hazuki and Mayu Iwatani and took part in a ¥10 Million Unit tournament, which was also for the Artist of Stardom Championship. They reached the finals, where they lost to the Artist of Stardom champions, MaiHimePoi, in a six-woman tag team ladder match. At Dream Queendom on December 29, Koguma unsuccessfully challenged Starlight Kid again for the High Speed Championship, this time in a three-way match also involving AZM.

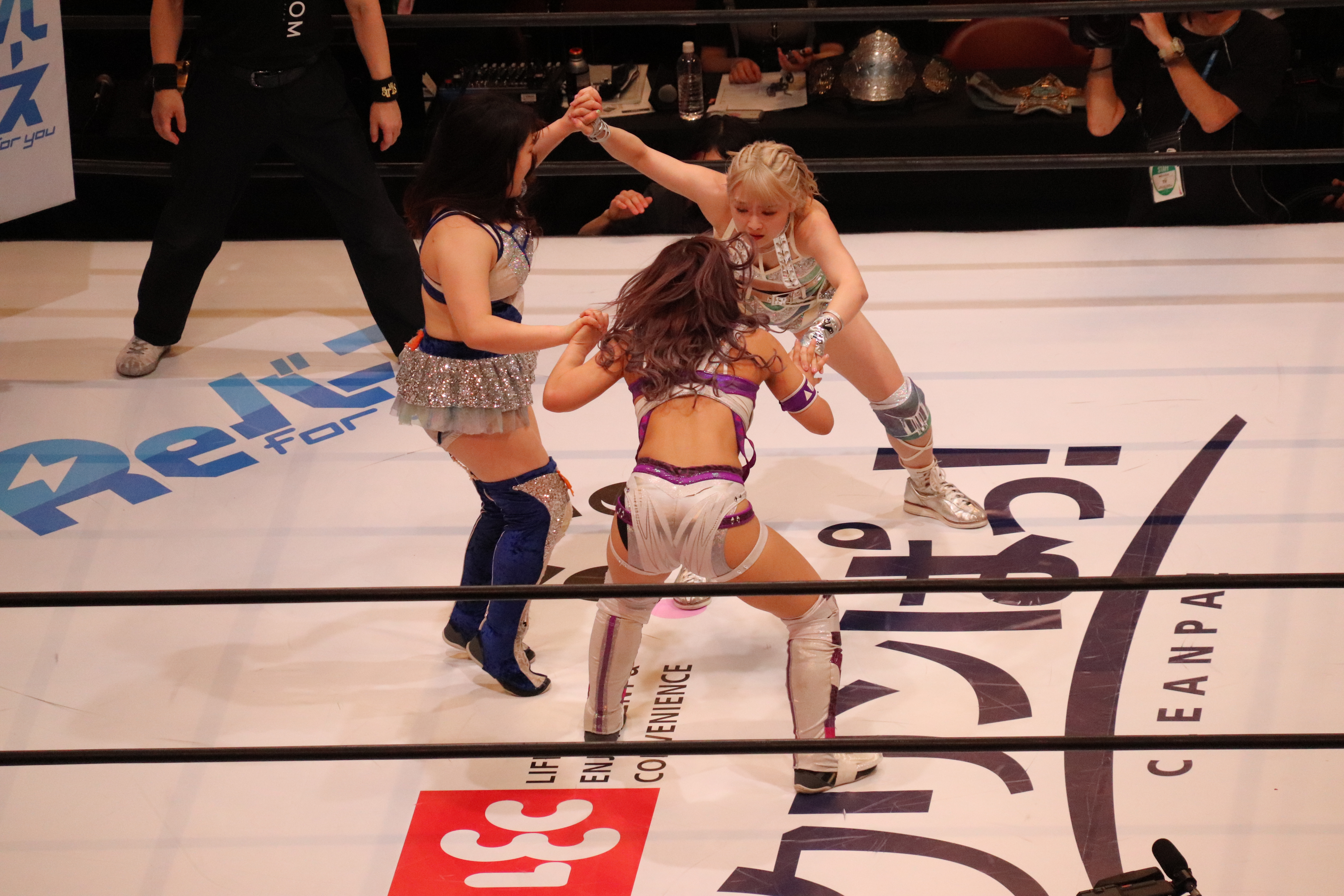
Koguma (left) facing AZM and Natsupoi on the second night of the Stardom World Climax 2022 from March 27.

On January 9, 2022, Koguma and Hazuki defeated Alto Livello Kabaliwan to win the Goddesses of Stardom Championship. At Nagoya Supreme Fight on January 29, Koguma and Hazuki scored their first successful Goddesses of Stardom defense against MaiHime. At Stardom Cinderella Journey on February 23, they defeated Cosmic Angels (Mina Shirakawa and Unagi Sayaka) to retain the titles again. On the first night of the Stardom World Climax 2022 from March 26, Hazuki and Koguma dropped the titles to Black Desire (Starlight Kid and Momo Watanabe). On the second night from March 27, Koguma competed in a three-way match for the High Speed Championship against the champion AZM and Natsupoi. At the Stardom Cinderella Tournament 2022, Koguma fell short to Mirai in the finals from April 29. At Stardom Golden Week Fight Tour in May 5, 2022, Hazuki and Koguma regained the Goddesses of Stardom Championship from Starlight Kid and Momo Watanabe. At Stardom Flashing Champions on May 28, 2022, they defended the titles against Giulia and Mai Sakurai. At Stardom Fight in the Top on June 26, 2022, Koguma teamed up with Mayu Iwatani and Hazuki to defeat (Utami Hayashishita, AZM and Saya Kamitani) in one of Stardom's first steel cage matches. At Mid Summer Champions in Nagoya on July 24, Hazuki and Koguma defended the Goddesses of Stardom Championship against God's Eye (Ami Sourei and Mirai). At Stardom 5 Star Grand Prix 2022, Koguma fought in the "Red Goddess" block where she scored a total of 14 points. At Stardom x Stardom: Nagoya Midsummer Encounter on August 21, 2022, Koguma and Hazuki dropped the Goddesses of Stardom Championship to Tam Nakano and Natsupoi. On May 11, 2025, Koguma and Hazuki announced official departure from STARS, leaving due to Iwatani’s departure and to take more time going overseas.

== Championships and accomplishments ==
- Consejo Mundial de Lucha Libre
  - CMLL Japanese Women's Championship (1 time)
- Oz Academy
  - Oz Academy Tag Team Championship (1 time) – with Hazuki
- Pro Wrestling Illustrated
  - Ranked No. 5 of the top 100 tag team in the PWI Tag Team 100 in 2022 with Hazuki
  - Ranked No. 91 of the top 150 female wrestlers in the PWI Women's 150 in 2022
- World Wonder Ring Stardom
  - Artist of Stardom Championship (1 time) – with Chelsea and Kairi Hojo
  - Goddesses of Stardom Championship (3 times) – with Hazuki
  - High Speed Championship (1 time)
  - Goddesses of Stardom Tag League (2021) – with Hazuki
  - 5★Star GP Award (1 time)
    - 5★Star GP Fighting Spirit Award (2014)
  - Stardom Year-End Award (3 times)
    - Best Tag Team Award (2021) with Hazuki
    - Best Unit Award (2022) as part of Stars, shared with Hanan, Hazuki, Mayu Iwatani, Momo Kohgo and Saya Iida
    - Fighting Spirit Award (2014)

== Kumas de Apuestas record ==
Winner (wager)	Loser (wager)	Location	Event	Date	Notes
Koguma (bear)	Ranna Yagami (bear)	Korakuen Hall, Tokyo	Stardom Supreme Fight	February 2, 2025	Due to her loss, Ranna Yagami was forced to do the Kuma (bear) pose
