= Momo Kohgo =

Japanese professional wrestler

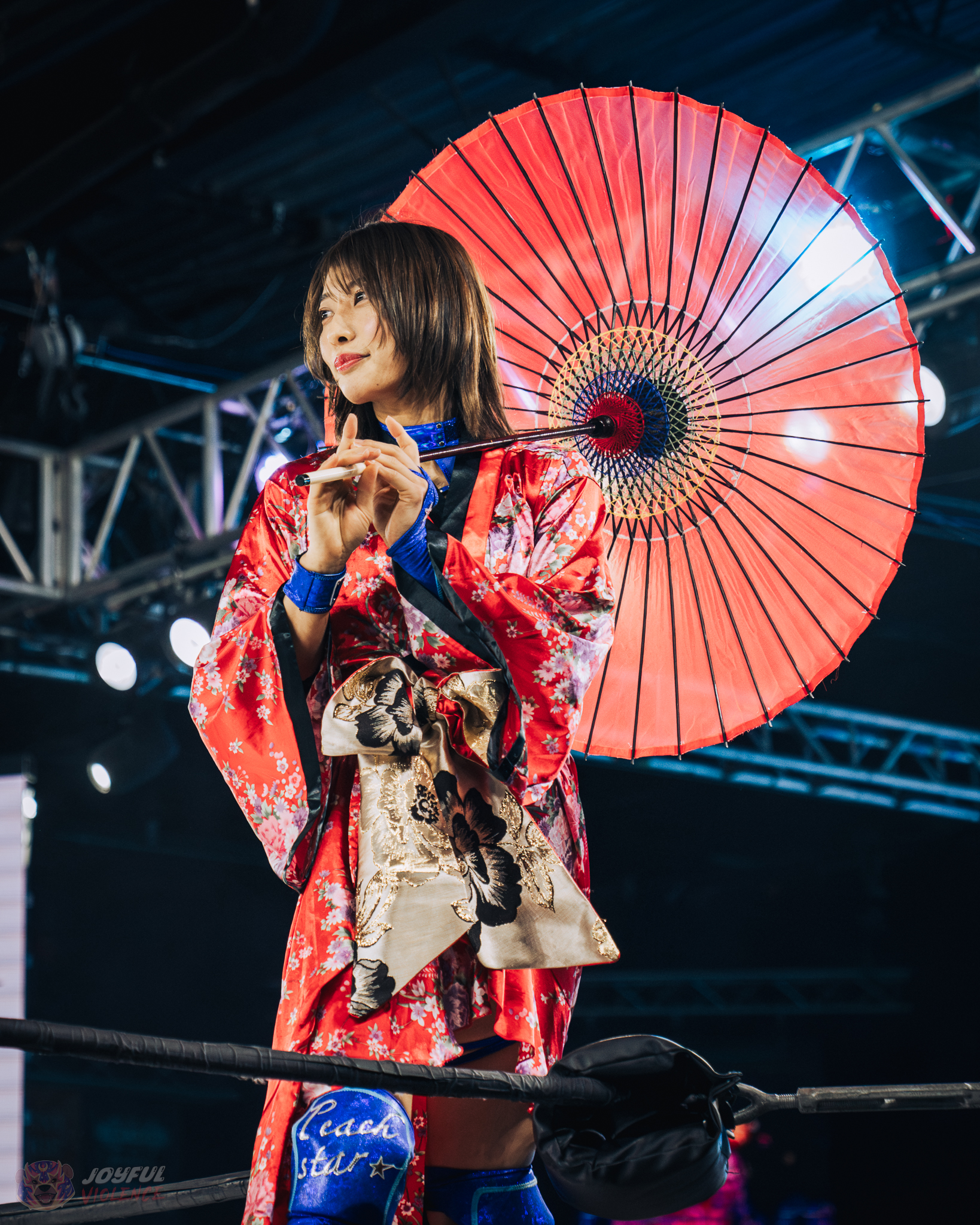
- Kohgo in April 2024

Personal information
- Born: 6 April Saitama, Japan

Professional wrestling career
- Ring name: Momo Kohgo
- Billed height: 165 cm (5 ft 5 in)
- Billed weight: 50 kg (110 lb)
- Trained by: Yumiko Hotta; Yuji Nagata; Hazuki; Mayu Iwatani
- Debut: April 30, 2019

Momo Kohgo (向後 桃, Kōgo Momo) is a Japanese professional wrestler. She works for World Wonder Ring Stardom, where she is a member of Stars. Kohgo is also known for her time in P's Party and Actwres girl'Z.

== Professional wrestling career ==
=== Japanese independent circuit (2019–2021) ===
Beginning as a freelancer, Kohgo is known for competing in multiple promotions of the Japanese independent scene. She competed in one of Pro Wrestling Wave's signature events, the 2021 Young Block Oh! Oh! division of the Catch the Wave tournament where she competed in the "Block A", scoring a total of two points after going against Tomoka Inaba, Ami Miura and Shizuku Tsukata. At New Ice Ribbon #1013 ~ RibbonMania 2019, an event promoted by Ice Ribbon on December 30, 2019, Kohgo competed in Tequila Saya's retirement 44-person gauntlet match which ended in a time-limit draw and also involved notable opponents such as Ken Ohka, Munenori Sawa, Manami Toyota, Ram Kaicho, Rina Shingaki, Matsuya Uno and many others. She is also known for competing in the "P's Party" branch of events. At Ice Ribbon P's Party #75 on May 19, 2021, she fell short to Madeline in a number one contender's match for the IW19 Championship.

=== Actwres girl'Z (2019–2021) ===
Kohgo made her professional wrestling debut on April 30, 2019, at Actwres girl'Z show AWG Actwres girl'Z In Korakuen where she fell short to Noa Igarashi. During her time in the promotion, she challenged for various titles such as the AWG Tag Team Championship by teaming up with Momo Tani at AWG Act 54 on September 25, 2021, in a losing effort against Kakeru Sekiguchi and Miku Aono.

=== Consejo Mundial de Lucha Libre (2021) ===
In the autumn of 2021, Kohgo had an excursion to the Mexican independent scene as she competed in several events promoted by Consejo Mundial de Lucha Libre (CMLL). She participated in the CMLL Women's Grand Prix, teaming up with Tsukasa Fujimoto and Tsukushi as "Team Japan" and competing against Team Mexico (Marcela, La Amapola, La Jarochita, Princesa Sugehit, Dark Silueta, Lluvia, and Reyna Isis) and Team World (Dalys la Caribeña, Avispa Dorada, Stephanie Vaquer and Sonya).

=== World Wonder Ring Stardom (2022–present) ===
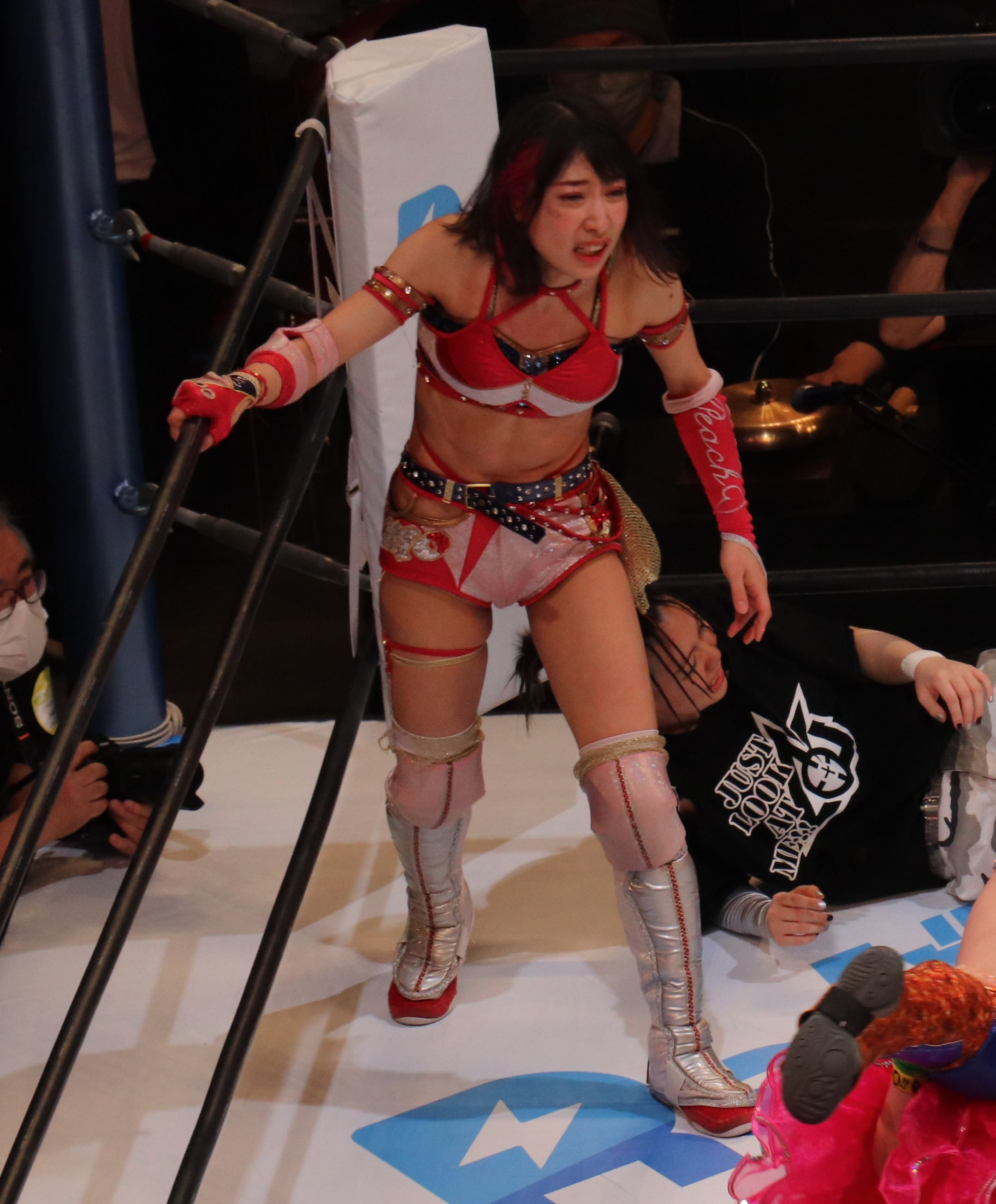
Kohgo in March 2022

At Stardom in Osaka event from January 23, 2022, Kohgo requested Stars members to let her join the unit which the latters accepted. At Stardom Cinderella Journey on February 23, 2022, Kohgo unsuccessfully challenged stablemate Hanan for the Future of Stardom Championship. At Stardom Cinderella Tournament 2022, Kohgo unsuccessfully faced stablemate Mayu Iwatani in the first round matches from April 3. At Mid Summer Champions in Tokyo, the first event of the Stardom Mid Summer Champions series which took place on July 9, 2022, Kohgo unsuccessfully challenged AZM for the High Speed Championship. Kohgo failed to qualify for the Stardom 5 Star Grand Prix 2022 after she participated in a qualifier block where she scored a total of four points.

=== New Japan Pro-Wrestling (2023–present) ===
On April 27, 2023, New Japan Pro-Wrestling (NJPW) announced that Kohgo would represent Stardom in a four-woman single-elimination tournament on May 21 at Resurgence to crown the inaugural Strong Women's Champion. At Resurgence, Kohgo lost to Willow Nightingale during the semi-finals of the tournament. On July 4, at the first night of Independence Day, Kohgo teamed up with Nightingale, who became the first Strong Women's Champion, to defeat Mafia Bella (Giulia and Thekla).

== Championships and accomplishments ==
- World Wonder Ring Stardom
  - Stardom Year-End Award (1 time)
    - Best Unit Award (2022) as part of Stars, shared with Hanan, Hazuki, Koguma, Mayu Iwatani and Saya Iida
