= Stardom Flashing Champions =

2022 World Wonder Ring Stardom event

- Promotional poster featuring various Stardom wrestlers
- Promotion: World Wonder Ring Stardom
- Date: May 28, 2022
- City: Tokyo, Japan
- Venue: Ota City General Gymnasium
- Attendance: 1,871

Event chronology
← Previous; New Blood 2	Next → Fight in the Top

Flashing Champions chronology
← Previous; First	Next → 2023

Stardom Flashing Champions (スターダム点滅チャンピオン, Sutādamu tenmetsu chanpion) was a professional wrestling event promoted by World Wonder Ring Stardom. The event took place on May 28, 2022, in Tokyo, Japan at the Ota City General Gymnasium, with a limited attendance due in part to the ongoing COVID-19 pandemic at the time.

Ten matches were contested at the event, including two on the pre-show, and all seven of Stardom's championships were on the line. The main event saw Syuri successfully defend the World of Stardom Championship against Risa Sera in a No count-out knockout and submission match. In other prominent matches, Saya Kamitani defeated Mirai to retain the Wonder of Stardom Championship, and Oedo Tai (Saki Kashima, Momo Watanabe and Starlight Kid) defeated MaiHimePoi (Maika, Himeka and Natsupoi) to win the Artist of Stardom Championship.

== Production ==
=== Storylines ===
After winning the 2022 edition of the Cinderella Tournament, Mirai expressed her granted wish as being a Wonder of Stardom Championship match on further notice. At Stardom Golden Week Fight Tour on May 5, 2022, Saya Kamitani defended the "white belt" successfully against Maika and later confronted Mirai who challenged her for the May 28 pay-per-view. Before founding God's Eye in late March and while still being a Donna Del Mondo member, Syuri, alongside her other stablemates engaged in a war against Prominence stable. On February 21, 2022, she teamed up with Giulia and went into a time-limit draw against Risa Sera and Akane Fujita. Syuri took the heat into stating that she would like to defend the World of Stardom Championship against Sera somewhere in the future, and further than the 2022 Climax, with the match being subsequently officialized for May 28.

=== Event ===
The show featured a total of ten professional wrestling matches that resulted from scripted storylines, where wrestlers portrayed villains, heroes, or less distinguishable characters in the scripted events that built tension and culminated in a wrestling match or series of matches. The event's press conference took place on May 17, 2022 at the Tokyo Culture Culture venue and was broadcast live on Starsom's YouTube channel.

New Japan Pro Wrestling's Great-O-Khan joined the commentary table for the night. The preshow portraited two matches. The first one saw Momo Kohgo, Saya Iida & Lady C picking a victory over Ami Sourei, Rina & Hina in a shuffled-unit six-woman tag tea match which was broadcast live on Stardom's YouTube channel. The second one saw Hanan retaining the Future of Stardom Championship against Ruaka. Tomoka Inaba from Professional Wrestling Just Tap Out, the then-time Sendai Girls Junior Champion stepped up to challenge Hanan for her title which the latter accepted.

The third match portraited the confrontation of Prominence's Suzu Suzuki, Akane Fujita & Mochi Natsumi and Cosmic Angels' Unagi Sayaka, Mina Shirakawa & Waka Tsukiyama. The latter lost the confrontation after Suzuki scored the pinfall over Tsukiyama. The fourth match saw AZM securing the fourth successful defense of the High Speed Championship against Thekla. Momo Kohgo stepped up to challenge AZM on further notice for the title. In the fifth match, Stars unit leader Mayu Iwatani successfully scored her first defense of the SWA World Championship against Fukigen Death. The next match saw Tam Nakano and a returning Kairi defeating Utami Hayashishita & Miyu Amasaki. Next, Hazuki & Koguma successfully defended the Goddesses of Stardom Championship for the first time in their second reign against Giulia & Mai Sakurai. Next, Saki Kashima, Momo Watanabe & Starlight Kid captured the Artist of Stardom Championship from Maika, Himeka & Natsupoi. The semi-main event saw Saya Kamitani successfully defending the Wonder of Stardom Championship against the 2022 Stardom Cinderella Tournament winner Mirai and then getting challenged by Starlight Kid.

In the main event, Syuri defeated Risa Sera via submission to retain the World of Stardom Championship due to the rest of the Prominence throwing in a towel. Syuri secured her fifth defense in a row. Momo Watanabe stepped up to challenge her for the "red belt" at Stardom Fight in the Top on June 26.

== Results ==
No.	Results	Stipulations	Times
1^{P}	Stars (Saya Iida and Momo Kohgo) and Lady C defeated Ami Sourei, Rina and Hina	Six-woman tag team match	6:15
2^{P}	Hanan (c) defeated Ruaka	Singles match for the Future of Stardom Championship	5:30
3	Prominence (Suzu Suzuki, Akane Fujita and Mochi Natsumi) defeated Cosmic Angels (Unagi Sayaka, Mina Shirakawa and Waka Tsukiyama)	Six-woman tag team match	10:56
4	AZM (c) defeated Thekla by submission	Singles match for the High Speed Championship	7:21
5	Mayu Iwatani (c) defeated Fukigen Death	Singles match for the SWA World Championship	4:59
6	White Knights (Tam Nakano and Kairi) defeated Queen's Quest (Utami Hayashishita and Miyu Amasaki)	Tag team match	19:44
7	Fukuoka Double Crazy (Hazuki and Koguma) (c) defeated Donna Del Mondo (Giulia and Mai Sakurai)	Tag team match for the Goddesses of Stardom Championship	15:11
8	Oedo Tai (Saki Kashima, Momo Watanabe and Starlight Kid) defeated MaiHimePoi (Maika, Himeka and Natsupoi) (c)	Six-woman tag team match for the Artist of Stardom Championship	14:07
9	Saya Kamitani (c) defeated Mirai	Singles match for the Wonder of Stardom Championship	25:01
10	Syuri (c) defeated Risa Sera	No count-out, knockout and submission match for the World of Stardom Championship	14:29
(c) / – the champion(s) heading into the match; P / – the match was broadcast on the pre-show
