= Stardom Fight in the Top =

2022 World Wonder Ring Stardom event

- Promotional poster featuring various wrestlers
- Promotion: World Wonder Ring Stardom
- Date: June 26, 2022
- City: Nagoya, Japan
- Venue: Nagoya International Conference Hall
- Attendance: 1,213

Event chronology
← Previous; Flashing Champions	Next → New Blood 3

Stardom Fight in the Top (トップのスターダムファイト, Toppu no sutādamufaito) was a professional wrestling event promoted by World Wonder Ring Stardom. The event took place on June 26, 2022, in Nagoya, Japan at the Nagoya International Conference Hall, with a limited attendance due in part to the ongoing COVID-19 pandemic at the time.

== Production ==
=== Background ===
The show featured six professional wrestling matches that resulted from scripted storylines, where wrestlers portrayed villains, heroes, or less distinguishable characters in the scripted events that built tension and culminated in a wrestling match or series of matches. The press conference for the event was held on June 7, 2022 and was broadcast on Stardom's YouTube channel.

=== Event ===
The preshow match was broadcast on Stardom's YouTube channel. Ruaka defeated Cosmic Angels' Unagi Sayaka and Waka Tsukiyama in a three-way match. During the preshow transmission, a masked silhouette was shown attacking Saya Kamitani and Rossy Ogawa in a hallway. The second match saw Momo Kohgo and Saya Iida defeating Lady C & Miyu Amasaki in a tag team match. The third match had Himeka picking a victory over Mina Shirakawa. Saki Kashima, Momo Watanabe & Starlight Kid retained the Artist of Stardom Championship in the three-way elimination tag team match against Donna Del Mondo's Giulia, Maika & Mai Sakurai, and God's Eye's World of Stardom Champion Syuri, Ami Sourei & Mirai. The fifth match saw Tam Nakano and Natsupoi fighting in the first-ever steel cage match held by Stardom, continuing a feud that started long ago at Stardom Yokohama Dream Cinderella 2021 on April 4 when Natsupoi unsuccessfully challenged Nakano for the Wonder of Stardom Championship.

The main event had the SWA World Champion Mayu Iwatani and the Goddesses of Stardom Champions Koguma & Hazuki taking on Utami Hayashishita, the Wonder of Stardom Champion Saya Kamitani, and the High Speed Champion AZM in a steel cage match in which the last member to fail to escape the cage was AZM who attracted her team's loss. After their victory, Iwatani, Koguma & Hazuki challenged Starlight Kid, Momo Watanabe & Saki Kashima for the Artist of Stardom Championship on further notice. Kid came out to accept the challenge.

== Results ==
No.	Results	Stipulations	Times
1^{P}	Ruaka defeated Unagi Sayaka and Waka Tsukiyama	Three-way match	6:01
2	Stars (Momo Kohgo and Saya Iida) defeated Queen's Quest (Miyu Amasaki and Lady C) by submission	Tag team match	8:53
3	Himeka defeated Mina Shirakawa	Singles match	10:05
4	Oedo Tai (Saki Kashima, Momo Watanabe and Starlight Kid) (c) defeated God's Eye (Syuri, Ami Sourei and Mirai) and Donna Del Mondo (Giulia, Maika and Mai Sakurai)	Three-way six-woman tag team match for the Artist of Stardom Championship	23:00
5	Tam Nakano defeated Natsupoi	Steel cage match (Note: A certain wrestler must pin their opponent to be allowed to climb and escape the steel cage.)	25:05
6	Stars (Mayu Iwatani, Hazuki and Koguma) defeated Queen's Quest (Utami Hayashishita, Saya Kamitani and AZM)	Six-woman tag team steel cage match With no pinfalls or submissions, the match could be won only by escaping the steel cage.	24:36
(c) / – the champion(s) heading into the match; P / – the match was broadcast on the pre-show
