= Stardom World Climax 2022 =

2022 World Wonder Ring Stardom event

World Climax 2022
- Promotional poster featuring Giulia, Syuri, and Mayu Iwatani
- Promotion: World Wonder Ring Stardom
- Date: March 26–27, 2022
- City: Tokyo, Japan
- Venue: Ryōgoku Kokugikan
- Attendance: Night 1: 2,712; Night 2: 3,085
- Tagline(s): "The Best" "The Top"

Event chronology
← Previous; New Blood 1	Next → Cinderella Tournament 2022

The Stardom World Climax 2022 was a two-day professional wrestling event promoted by World Wonder Ring Stardom. The event took place on March 26 and 27, 2022, in Tokyo, Japan at the Ryōgoku Kokugikan, with a limited attendance due in part to the ongoing COVID-19 pandemic at the time.

== Event ==
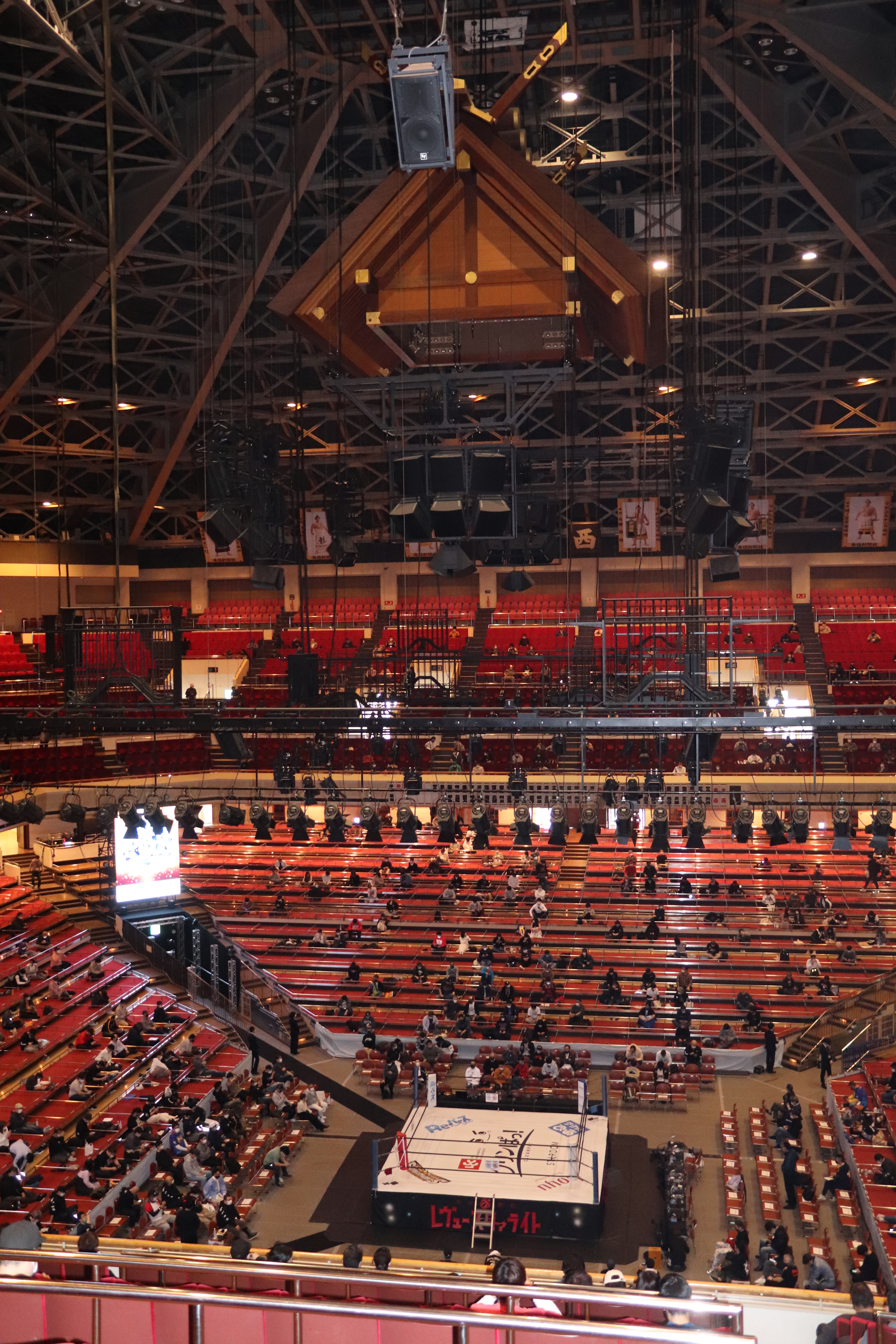
The second night of the show featured an audience of 3,085 fans.

=== Background ===
The show featured a total of seventeen professional wrestling matches (eight on the first night, nine on the second) that resulted from scripted storylines, where wrestlers portrayed villains, heroes, or less distinguishable characters in the scripted events that built tension and culminated in a wrestling match or series of matches. The press conference for the event was held on March 3, 2022, and was broadcast live on Stardom's YouTube channel, announcing and officializing all of the matches from both nights. For the second night, various rookie talent from other promotions from the Japanese independent scene who also competed in the New Blood 1 event on March 11, were announced to be part of the Cinderella rumble such as Tomoka Inaba and Aoi from Professional Wrestling Just Tap Out's "queen division", Haruka Umesaki and Nanami from World Woman Pro-Wrestling Diana, Maria and Ai Houzan from Marvelous That's Women Pro Wrestling, and Mei Suruga and Yuna Mizumori from Gatoh Move Pro Wrestling's Choco Pro branch.

=== Storylines ===
On February 28, 2022, Kairi Hojo returned to Stardom after working for WWE from 2017 until 2021 under the ring name of Kairi Sane. It was announced that Hojo would participate in World Climax, now under the name Kairi stylized in all caps. At the press conference, she was confronted by Cosmic Angels members Unagi Sayaka and Tam Nakano, with the latter challenging her to a tag team match at the event with Kairi expressing interest in teaming with Mayu Iwatani against Sayaka and Nakano. As Kairi was leaving she was jumped and attacked viciously by Oedo Tai's Natsuko Tora, Starlight Kid and Momo Watanabe.

=== Matches ===
==== Night 1 ====
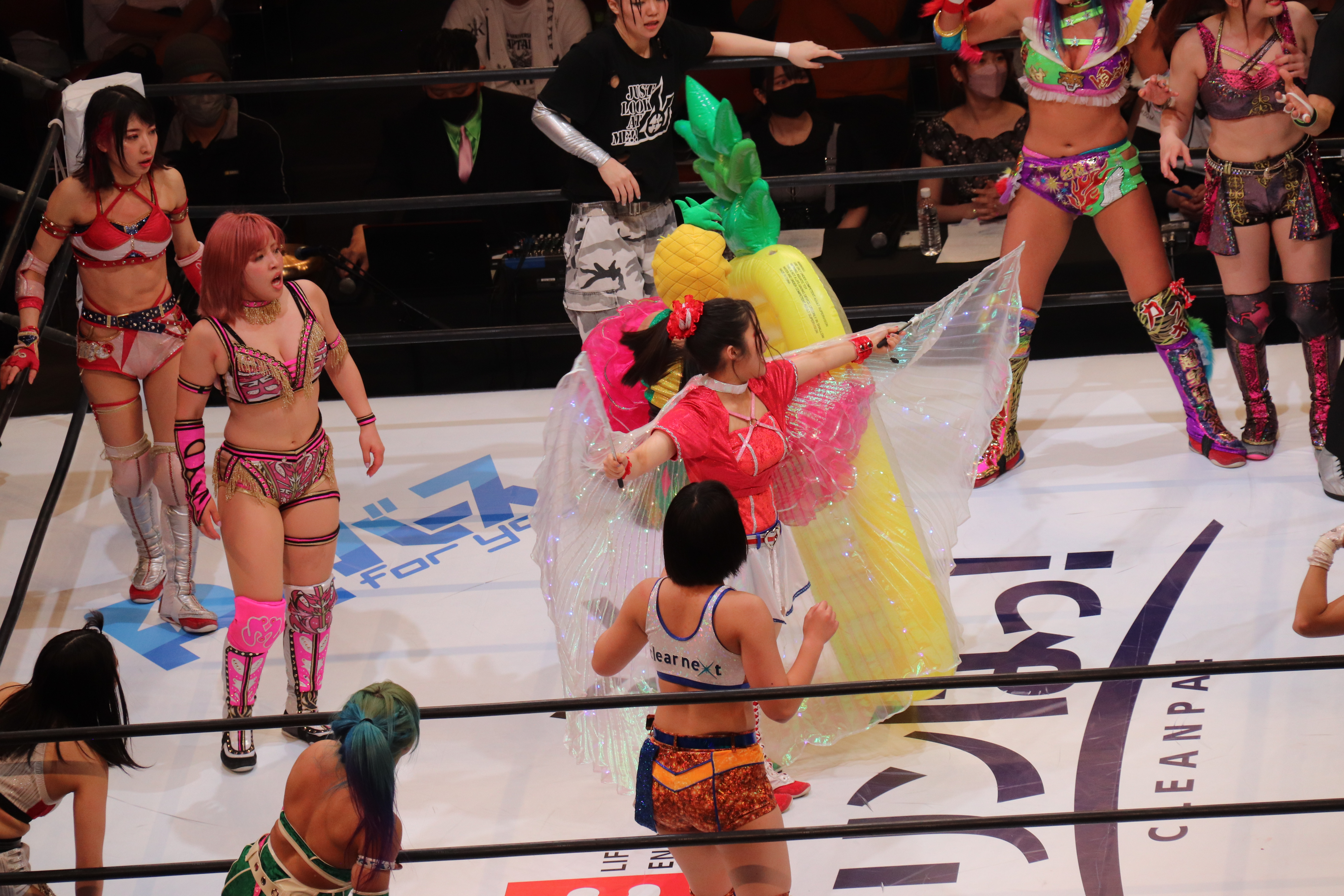
Moment from the 18-woman Cinderella Rumble match featuring various wrestlers.

The first night of the show took place on March 26 under the tagline of "The Best", with the preshow fight between the retaining Future of Stardom Champion Hanan against Rina being broadcast live on Stardom's YouTube channel. The first show from the main card portraited the singles match between Saya Iida and Mirai, won by the latter as a result of a submission. The third match saw Donna Del Mondo's sub-unit of "Second MaiHimePoi" composed of Himeka, Natsupoi & Mai Sakurai (the first MaiHimePoi being composed of Maika instead of Sakurai) winning the six-woman tag team gauntlet match. Next, Prominence's Suzu Suzuki & Risa Sera picked up a victory against the SWA World Champion Thekla & Maika, and amplified the tensions between the independent stable and Donna Del Mondo. Next, Oedo Tai's sub-unit of Black Desire, composed of Starlight Kid & Momo Watanabe dethroned FWC (Hazuki & Koguma) to take the Goddesses of Stardom Championship, first time for Kid, second for Watanabe as an individual. Next, the returning Kairi teamed up with Stars stable leader Mayu Iwatani to defeat Tam Nakano & Unagi Sayaka. In the seventh match of the night, Saya Kamitani successfully defended the Wonder of Stardom Championship against Queen's Quest stablemate Utami Hayashishita as a counterpart of their match from Stardom All Star Dream Cinderella on March 3, 2021 where Hayashishita successfully defended the World of Stardom Championship against Kamitani. The main event saw Syuri successfully defending the "red belt" against fellow stablemate Giulia. After she retained, Syuri said she wants to walk on her path and would tease the formation of a new stable, with a mysterious girl helping her out of the arena as the first announced member. The girl was later presented to be Ami Miura from Actwres girl'Z.

==== Night 2 ====
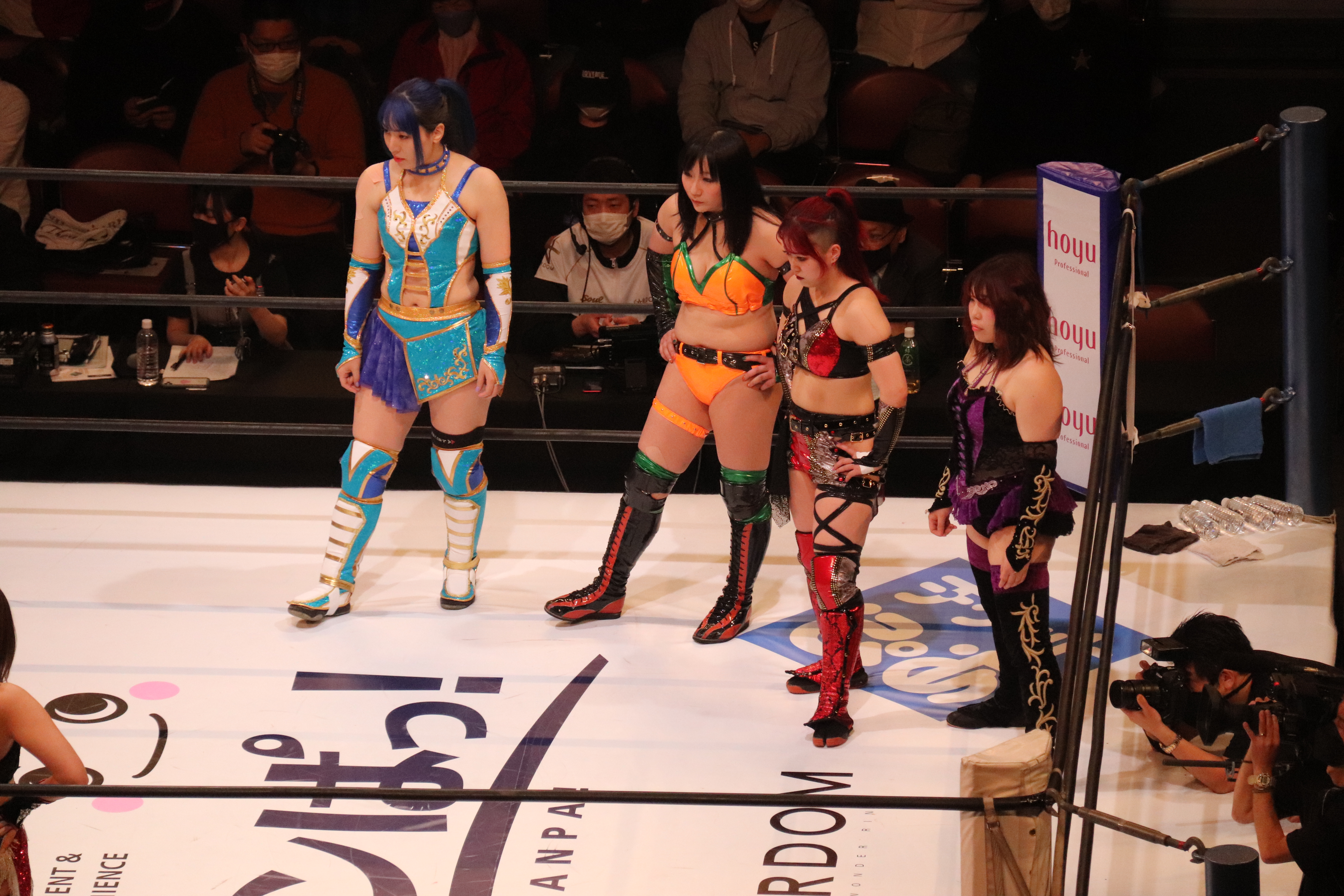
From left to right: Prominence's (Risa Sera, Akane Fujita, Suzu Suzuki & Mochi Miyagi), moments before their confrontation with Donna Del Mondo.

The second night of the event occurred on March 27 under the tag line of "The Top" and started with Hanan successfully defending the Future of Stardom Championship against Mai Sakurai. At the end of the match, a returning Hina came out to challenge her for the championship. The preshow, on the first day, was broadcast on Stardom's YouTube channel. After winning the 18-woman cinderella rumble, Mei Suruga issued a challenge for AZM's High Speed Championship. The third match saw Utami Hayashishita, who lost the Wonder of Stardom Championship confrontation against Saya Kamitani the previous night defeating Mirai by submission. The fourth match portrayed Momo Watanabe defeating Hazuki, pointing to their past match from Stardom Dream Queendom on December 29, 2021 against Mayu Iwatani & Takumi Iroha in which Watanabe dumped Hazuki by leaving the ring and attracted a loss. In the fifth match, AZM successfully defended the High Speed Championship for the first time in her second reign against Natsupoi and Koguma. Next, Kairi defeated Starlight Kid in a singles match. However, it was reported that Kairi suffered a legitimate ruptured eardrum. Next, Donna Del Mondo's Giulia, Himeka, Maika & Thekla succeeded in defeating Prominence's Risa Sera, Suzu Suzuki, Akane Fujita & Mochi Miyagi. Despite their loss, Suzu Suzuki stated that she was not finished with Giulia and that she will continue to chase the latter in various future confrontations until she succeeds in defeating the Donna Del Mondo leader. Next, Saya Kamitani defended the Wonder of Stardom successfully against Tam Nakano, making the second defense for Kamitani in less than twenty-four hours.

The main event portraited the confrontation between Syuri and Mayu Iwatani with the World of Stardom Championship at stake. Syuri succeeded in defending and as Saya Kamitani, scored a second defense in less than twenty-four hours.

== Results ==
~The Best~ (March 26)
No.	Results	Stipulations	Times
1^{P}	Hanan (c) defeated Rina	Singles match for the Future of Stardom Championship	7:05
2	Mirai defeated Saya Iida by submission	Singles match	10:23
3	Donna Del Mondo (Himeka, Natsupoi and Mai Sakurai) defeated Queen's Quest (AZM, Lady C and Miyu Amasaki), Cosmic Angels (Waka Tsukiyama, Mina Shirakawa) and Momo Kohgo, and Oedo Tai (Saki Kashima, Fukigen Death and Ruaka)	Six-woman tag team gauntlet match	9:58
4	Prominence (Risa Sera and Suzu Suzuki) (with Hiragi Kurumi) defeated Donna Del Mondo (Maika and Thekla)	Tag team match	10:27
5	Black Desire (Momo Watanabe and Starlight Kid) defeated FWC (Hazuki and Koguma) (c)	Tag team match for the Goddesses of Stardom Championship	14:08
6	Mayu Iwatani and Kairi defeated Cosmic Angels (Tam Nakano and Unagi Sayaka)	Tag team match	17:36
7	Saya Kamitani (c) defeated Utami Hayashishita	Singles match for the Wonder of Stardom Championship	27:11
8	Syuri (c) defeated Giulia	Singles match for the World of Stardom Championship	26:54
(c) / – the champion(s) heading into the match; P / – the match was broadcast on the pre-show

~The Top~ (March 27)
No.	Results	Stipulations	Times
1^{P}	Hanan (c) defeated Mai Sakurai	Singles match for the Future of Stardom Championship	6:20
2	Mei Suruga won by last eliminating Miyu Amasaki (Note: The remaining Rumble participants were Unagi Sayaka, Mina Shirakawa, Lady C, Saki Kashima, Ruaka, Saya Iida, Momo Kohgo, Waka Tsukiyama, Rina, Tomoka Inaba, Aoi, Haruka Umesaki, Nanami, Maria, Ai Houzan, and Yuna Mizumori.)	18-women Cinderella Rumble match	25:24
3	Utami Hayashishita defeated Mirai by submission	Singles match	11:22
4	Momo Watanabe defeated Hazuki	Singles match	12:19
5	AZM (c) defeated Koguma and Natsupoi	Three-way match for the High Speed Championship	8:10
6	Kairi defeated Starlight Kid	Singles match	17:51
7	Donna Del Mondo (Giulia, Himeka, Maika and Thekla) defeated Prominence (Risa Sera, Suzu Suzuki, Akane Fujita and Mochi Miyagi) (with Hiragi Kurumi)	Eight-woman tag team match	16:03
8	Saya Kamitani (c) defeated Tam Nakano	Singles match for the Wonder of Stardom Championship	23:10
9	Syuri (c) defeated Mayu Iwatani by submission	Singles match for the World of Stardom Championship	28:57
(c) / – the champion(s) heading into the match; P / – the match was broadcast on the pre-show
