= Stardom Cinderella Tournament 2022 =

2022 World Wonder Ring Stardom event

- Promotional poster of the event
- Promotion: World Wonder Ring Stardom
- Date: April 3–29, 2022
- City: Tokyo, Japan (April 3, 17 & 29); Osaka, Japan (April 10)
- Venue: Tachikawa Stage Garden (April 3); Edion Arena Osaka (April 10); Korakuen Hall (April 17); Ota City General Gymnasium (April 29)
- Attendance: Night 1 (928); Night 2 (661); Night 3 (1,151); Night 4 (2,017)

Event chronology
← Previous; World Climax 2022	Next → Golden Week Fight Tour

Cinderella Tournament chronology
← Previous; 2021	Next → 2023

The 2022 Stardom Cinderella Tournament (スターダムシンデレラトーナメント2022, Sutādamushindereratōnamento 2022) was the eighth annual professional wrestling single-elimination tournament under the Cinderella Tournament branch of events promoted by World Wonder Ring Stardom in Tokyo and Osaka. The event took place between April 3 and April 29, 2022, with a limited attendance due in part to the ongoing COVID-19 pandemic at the time.

== Storylines ==
The show featured professional wrestling matches with scripted storylines, where wrestlers portray villains, heroes, or less distinguishable characters in the scripted events that built tension and culminate in a wrestling match or series of matches. The matches can be won by pinfall, submission or elimination over the top rope. A time-limit draw or a double elimination means a loss for each competitor.

== Event ==
=== Night 1 (April 3) ===
The first day of the event which took place on April 3, 2022, portraited the first-round tournament matches and started with a returning Hina who fell short to Unagi Sayaka and Waka Tsukiyama quickly getting rolled up by Saki Kashima. These two matches were broadcast on Stardom's YouTube channel as the preshow matches. Fourteen other matches occurred. In the only second-round match of the evening, Maika and Saya Kamitani went into a double over-the-top rope elimination. Maika challenged Kamitani for the Wonder of Stardom Championship at Stardom Golden Week Fight Tour on May 5 which the latter accepted. The main event portrays Syuri who defeated her new bodyguard Ami Sourei. Syuri revealed her new unit's name as "God's Eye", and another recruit into the stable was Mirai who quietly quit Donna Del Mondo to align herself with Syuri and Sourei.

=== Night 2 (April 10) ===
The second day of the event which took place on April 10, 2022, portraited one of the tournament's second-round matches, where Syuri and Himeka went into a time-limit draw, therefore attracting their disqualification from the tournament. Post match, Syuri figured it out that Himeka wants a shot to the World of Stardom Championship which Syuri was willing to give to the latter. In the other tournament match, Hazuki defeated the High Speed Champion AZM, and because of Syuri and Himeka's double disqualification, she received a walkover victory which launched herself directly to the semi-finals. In the main event, Momo Watanabe and Starlight Kid successfully defended the Goddesses of Stardom Championship against Giulia and Thekla. After their victory, Koguma and Hazuki stepped up as their new challengers to demand their rematch for the titles which the Oedo Tai's subgroup accepted.

=== Night 3 (April 17) ===
The third night of the tournament which took place on April 17, 2022, saw Koguma, Natsupoi and Mirai making their ways to the semi-finals from April 29. Queen's Quest announced that they will hold an election to determine the unit's new leader and Syuri had announced that a female bodyguard from her new God's Eye stable would be debuting superstar. The show also featured a returning Konami who reached out via video message, announcing that they will be supporting God's Eye during the upcoming Golden Week Tour in May.

=== Night 4 (April 29) ===
The fourth and last night of the event occurred on April 29, 2022, and featured the semi-finals and finals of the 2022 Cinderella Tournament. The preshow match between Ami Sourei, Mai Sakurai and Waka Tsukiyama was broadcast on Stardom's YouTube channel. New Japan Pro Wrestling legend Yuji Nagata joined the commentary table for the night. After winning the gauntlet tag match, Tam Nakano, Mina Shirakawa and Unagi Sayaka received future match challenges from the Color's unit members Saki, Hikari Shimizu, Rina Amikura and Yuko Sakurai who stepped up for the Cosmic Angels members. Mirai won the 2022 edition of the Cinderella Tournament by defeating Koguma in the finals. She became the second wrestler to win the tournament in her debuting year after Giulia in 2020. Mirai declared her wish as being a Wonder of Stardom Championship match for the Stardom Flashing Champions event on May 28.

The main event portraited the confrontation between Syuri and Himeka for the World of Stardom Championship, bout which solded with God's Eye leader retaining.

No.	Results	Stipulations	Times
1^{P}	Ami Sourei defeated Mai Sakurai and Waka Tsukiyama	Three-way match	4:19
2	Hanan (c) defeated Hina	Singles match for the Future of Stardom Championship	6:26
3	Koguma defeated Hazuki	Cinderella tournament semi-finals match	6:17
4	Mirai defeated Natsupoi by submission	Cinderella tournament semi-finals match	8:17
5	Cosmic Angels (Tam Nakano, Mina Shirakawa and Unagi Sayaka) defeated Donna Del Mondo (Giulia, Maika and Thekla), Queen's Quest (Utami Hayashishita, Saya Kamitani and Lady C), Oedo Tai (Ruaka, Starlight Kid and Momo Watanabe), Stars (Mayu Iwatani, Saya Iida and Momo Kohgo), and Oedo Tai (Saki Kashima, Rina and Fukigen Death)	Six-team gauntlet tag match	25:12
6	AZM (c) defeated Mei Suruga	Singles match for the High Speed Championship	13:06
7	Mirai defeated Koguma	Cinderella tournament final	11:45
8	Syuri (c) defeated Himeka	Singles match for the World of Stardom Championship	21:24
(c) / – the champion(s) heading into the match; P / – the match was broadcast on the pre-show

== Participants ==
The tournament started with 31 competitors entering it, including the champions. Syuri and Saya Kamitani who at the time of the event were World and Wonder of Stardom Champions received a bye, therefore automatically qualifying for the second-round. However, at the event's press conference from March 29, 2022, it was revealed that Ami Miura (later Ami Sourei), Syuri's new stable bodyguard would challenge the latter to a match in the first rounds of the tournament. Miura would go under the name of Ami Sourei and was officially presented as a new member of Stardom's roster.

*Noted underneath are the champions who held their titles at the time of the tournament.

Wrestler	Unit	Notes
Ami Sourei	God's Eye	
AZM	Queen's Quest	High Speed Champion
Giulia	Donna Del Mondo	
Hanan	Stars	Future of Stardom Champion
Hazuki	Stars	
Himeka	Donna Del Mondo	Artist of Stardom Champion
Hina	Queen's Quest	
Fukigen Death	Oedo Tai	
Koguma	Stars	
Lady C	Queen's Quest	
Mai Sakurai	Donna Del Mondo	
Maika	Donna Del Mondo	Artist of Stardom Champion
Mayu Iwatani	Stars	
Mina Shirakawa	Cosmic Angels	
Mirai	Donna Del Mondo/God's Eye	Winner
Miyu Amasaki	Queen's Quest	
Momo Kohgo	Stars	
Momo Watanabe	Oedo Tai	Goddesses of Stardom Champion
Natsupoi	Donna Del Mondo	Artist of Stardom Champion
Rina	Oedo Tai	
Ruaka	Oedo Tai	
Saki Kashima	Oedo Tai	
Saya Iida	Stars	
Saya Kamitani	Queen's Quest	Wonder of Stardom Champion
Starlight Kid	Oedo Tai	Goddesses of Stardom Champion
Syuri	God's Eye	World of Stardom Champion
Tam Nakano	Cosmic Angels	
Thekla	Donna Del Mondo	SWA World Champion
Unagi Sayaka	Cosmic Angels	
Utami Hayashishita	Queen's Quest	
Waka Tsukiyama	Cosmic Angels	

== Brackets ==
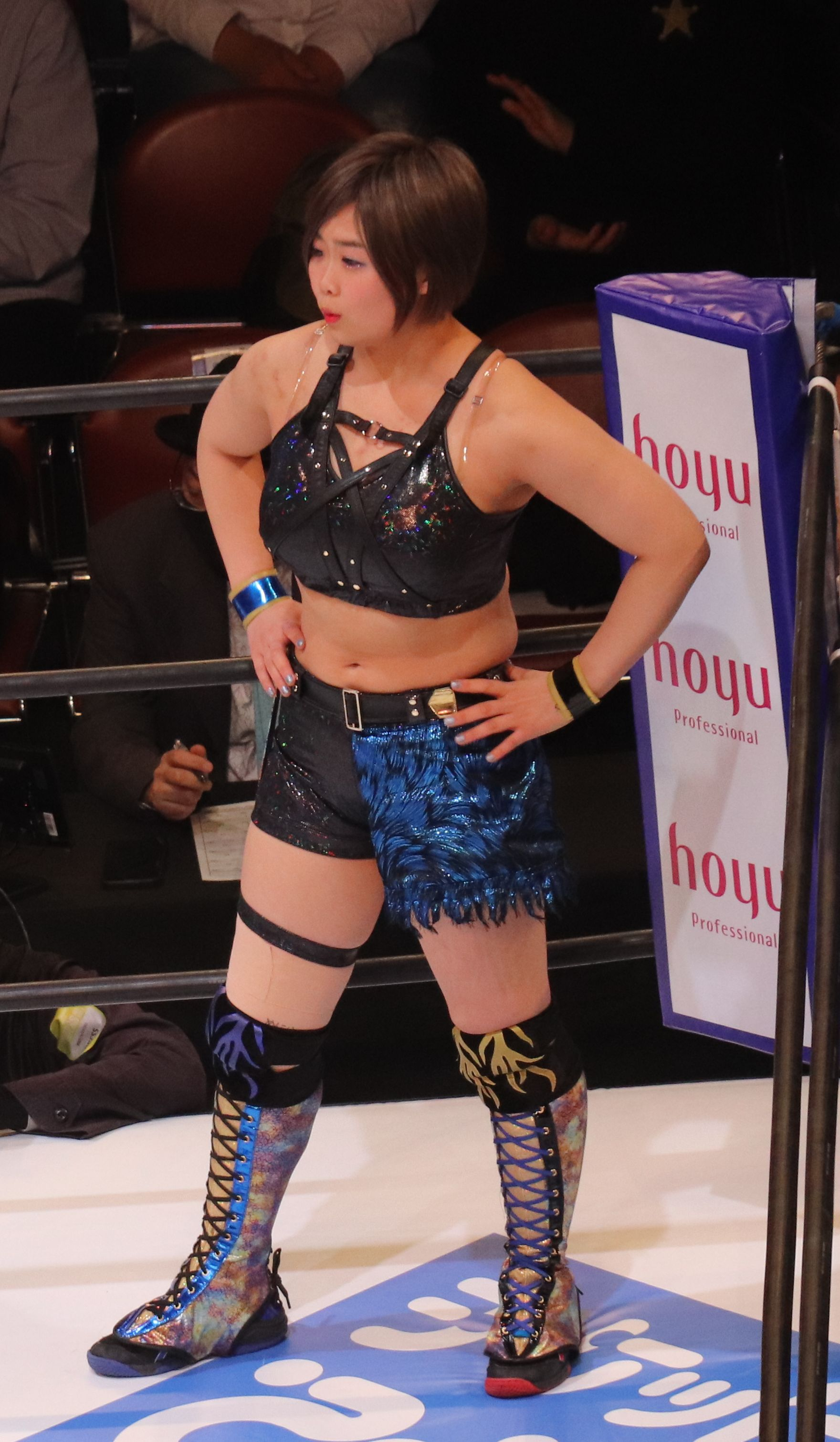
Winner of the 2022 Cinderella Tournament, Mirai.

Round 1 April 3
Syuri	Sub
Ami Sourei	9:48
Himeka	Pin
Ruaka	6:02
Hazuki	Sub
Miyu Amasaki	5:32
AZM	Pin
Momo Watanabe	3:04
Thekla	8:54
Giulia	Pin
Koguma	Pin
Fukigen Death	4:33
Saya Iida	Pin
Rina	4:46
Lady C	5:31
Mai Sakurai	Pin
Utami Hayashishita	Draw (Note: Due to the match going into a time-limit draw, both Nakano and Hayashishita got eliminated from the tournament, therefore Mirai received a bye straight to the quarter-finals.)
Tam Nakano	10:00
Mina Shirakawa	8:20
Mirai	Elim
Waka Tsukiyama	1:59
Saki Kashima	Pin
Mayu Iwatani	Pin
Momo Kohgo	5:48
Unagi Sayaka	Pin
Hina	6:27
Natsupoi	Elim
Starlight Kid	5:54
Maika	Pin
Hanan	4:37

Round 2 April 3, 10, 17
Syuri	Draw (Note: Syuri and Himeka went into a time-limit draw, therefore both getting disqualified from the tournament.)
Himeka	10:00
Hazuki	Pin
AZM	5:11
Giulia	7:38
Koguma	Elim
Saya Iida	Pin
Mai Sakurai	5:53
Bye	N/A
Mirai	-
Saki Kashima	0:17
Mayu Iwatani	Pin
Unagi Sayaka	4:45
Natsupoi	Pin
Maika	6:34
Saya Kamitani	Draw (Note: Maika and Kamitani eliminated each other simultaneously over the top rope, therefore attracting their eliminations from the tournament.)

Quarterfinals; April 17
Bye	N/A
Hazuki	-
Koguma	4:52
Saya Iida	Pin
Mirai	6:47
Saki Kashima	Pin
Natsupoi	-
Bye	N/A

Semifinals; April 29
Hazuki	Pin
Koguma	6:17
Mirai	8:17
Natsupoi	Sub

Final; April 29
Koguma	Pin
Mirai	11:45
