= Stardom Cinderella Tournament 2021 =

2021 World Wonder Ring Stardom event

- Promotional poster featuring various Stardom wrestlers
- Promotion: World Wonder Ring Stardom
- Date: Night 1: April 10, 2021; Night 2: May 14, 2021; Night 3: June 12, 2021
- City: Tokyo, Japan
- Venue: Korakuen Hall (April 10, May 14); Ota City General Gymnasium (June 12)
- Attendance: Night 1: 606 (April 10); Night 2: 556 (May 14); Night 3: 1,240 (June 12)

Event chronology
← Previous; Yokohama Dream Cinderella 2021	Next → Yokohama Dream Cinderella 2021 in Summer

Cinderella Tournament chronology
← Previous; 2020	Next → 2022

The 2021 Stardom Cinderella Tournament (スターダムシンデレラトーナメント2021, Sutādamushindereratōnamento 2021), was the seventh annual professional wrestling single-elimination tournament under the Cinderella Tournament branch of events promoted by World Wonder Ring Stardom which took place beginning with April 10 and culminating on June 12 in the Ota City General Gymnasium. The tournament expanded out of the normal single night format to instead be determined over two separate dates with a limited attendance due in part to the ongoing COVID-19 pandemic at the time.

The tournament winner is awarded a wish that has prompted opportunities for the championship of their choice. Night 2 was postponed due to the Japanese government announcing a state of emergency for Tokyo lasting from April 25 until May 11. The rest of the tournament was rescheduled to May 14 and June 12, with the second-round and quarter-finals matches taking place on May 14. The semi-finals and finals were initially going to take place on May 29, but the extension of the state of emergency postponed the third night of the event to June 12.

== Storylines ==
The show featured professional wrestling matches that resulted from scripted storylines, where wrestlers portrayed villains, heroes, or less distinguishable characters in the scripted events that built tension and culminated in a wrestling match or series of matches.

On the second night of the tournament, former High Speed Champion Koguma made her in-ring return, saving Mayu Iwatani from an attack performed by Oedo Tai after she fell short to Himeka in the quarter-finals of the tournament. Koguma was later revealed to have joined STARS.

On the third night of the tournament which took place on June 12 due to delays caused by the COVID-19 pandemic in Japan, STARS and Oedo Tai culminated their feud in a ten-woman All-Out War elimination tag team match won by Natsuko Tora who lastly eliminated Starlight Kid, therefore forcing her to join Oedo Tai. The show saw Saya Kamitani defeating Himeka in the semi-finals of the tournament and finally Maika in the finals to become the Cinderella Tournament winner of 2021. Kamitani issued a challenge to Tam Nakano for the Wonder of Stardom Championship as her granted wish for winning the tournament. The main event of the evening portraited the collision between Utami Hayashishita and Syuri for the World of Stardom Championship. The two of them went into a thirty-minute time-limit draw and Syuri requested a restart of the match which Hayashishita accepted. The second match ended in a double count-out as both of the competitors were unable to continue. After retaining the title, Hayashishita saw Natsuko Tora coming to challenge her for the red belt holding Starlight Kid's mask in her hand.

The first match between Syuri and Hayashishita received a 5.5 stars rating from Dave Meltzer, making it the highest-rated match in the history of women's professional wrestling till its date.

== Participants ==
The tournament featured twenty wrestlers, being the greatest Cinderella Tournament till date. Despite Bea Priestley announcing her departure from World Wonder Ring Stardom at Stardom Yokohama Dream Cinderella 2021 from April 4, she was still listed as a participant.

Ruaka and Hanan, previously listed as reserves, were announced on 7 April 2021, as replacements for the departing Bea Priestley and the injured Saya Iida.

=== Participants list ===
*Noted underneath are the champions who held their titles at the time of the tournament.

Wrestler	Unit	Notes
AZM	Queen's Quest	
Gokigen Death	Oedo Tai	
Giulia	Donna Del Mondo	Goddesses of Stardom Champion
Himeka	Donna Del Mondo	
Hanan	Stars	
Konami	Oedo Tai	
Maika	Donna Del Mondo	
Mayu Iwatani	Stars	
Mina Shirakawa	Cosmic Angels	Artist of Stardom Champion
Momo Watanabe	Queen's Quest	
Natsuko Tora	Oedo Tai	
Natsupoi	Donna Del Mondo	High Speed Champion
Ruaka	Oedo Tai	
Saki Kashima	Oedo Tai	
Saya Kamitani	Queen's Quest	Winner
Starlight Kid	Stars	
Syuri	Donna Del Mondo	Goddesses of Stardom Champion; SWA World Champion
Tam Nakano	Cosmic Angels	Wonder of Stardom Champion; Artist of Stardom Champion
Unagi Sayaka	Cosmic Angels	Artist of Stardom Champion
Utami Hayashishita	Queen's Quest	World of Stardom Champion

== Future of Stardom Championship Tournament ==
Due to Saya Iida relinquishing the Future of Stardom Championship due to injury, a seven-woman tournament to crown a new champion was announced to kick off on the second night of the event. The finals took place on July 4 at Yokohama Dream Cinderella 2021 in Summer.

Round 1 (May 14, 15, June 8)
Mina Shirakawa	5:01
Ruaka	Pin
Rina	5:43
Hina	Pin
Unagi Sayaka	6:21
Lady C	Pin

Round 2 (June 8)
Mina Shirakawa	7:50
Hina	Pin
Unagi Sayaka	8:53
Hanan	Pin

Final (July 4)
Mina Shirakawa	Pin
Unagi Sayaka	16:58

== Results ==
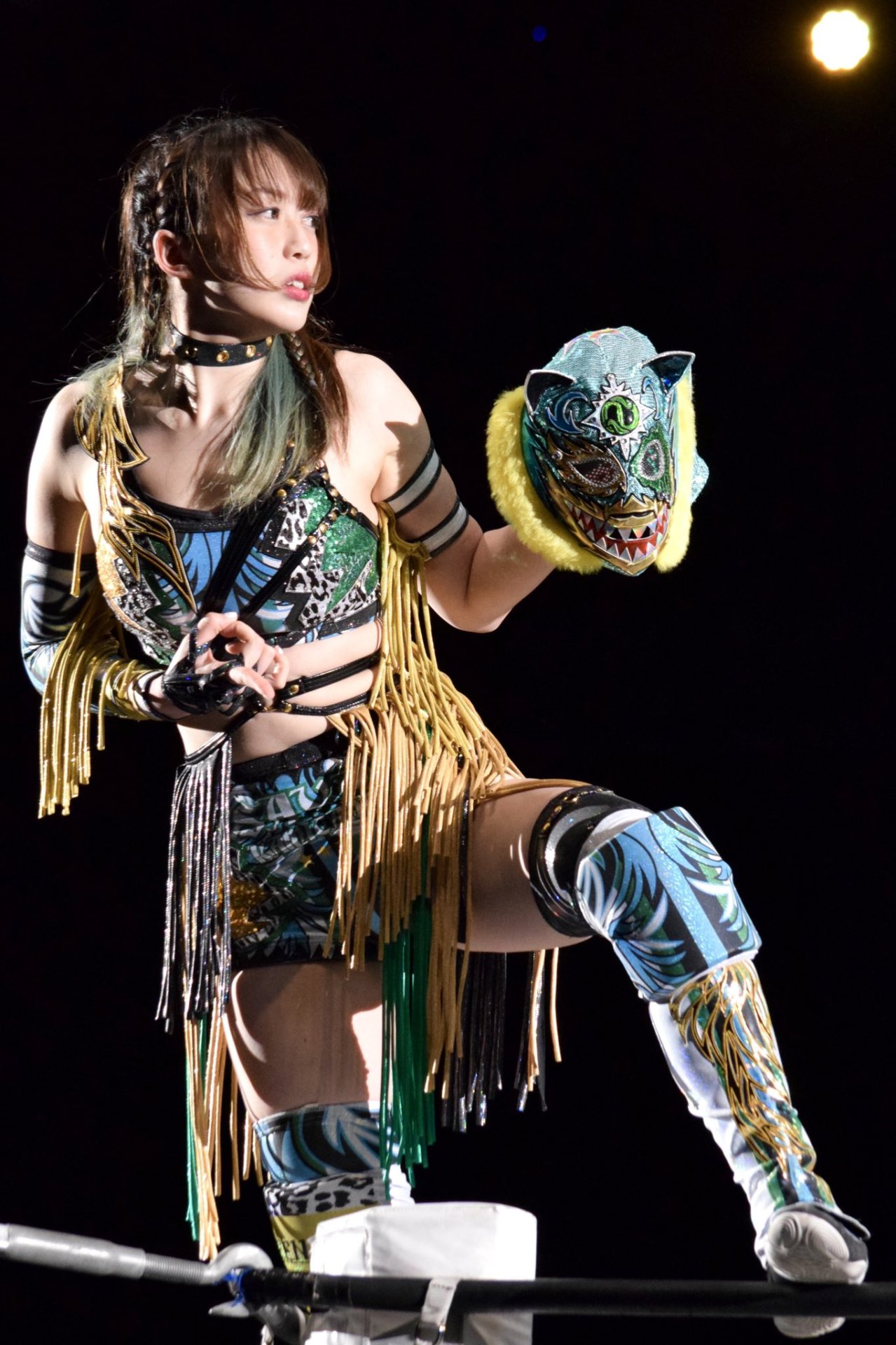
Winner of the 2021 Cinderella Tournament Saya Kamitani.

The match schedule of the first night was announced on April 7 after a press conference.

Night 1 (April 10)
No.	Results	Stipulations	Times
1	Hina defeated Lady C (Note: Initially a three-way match, but Rina replaced Saki Kashima in her tournament match, therefore it became a Singles match.)	Singles match	6:24
2	Himeka defeated Hanan	Cinderella Tournament First-round match	6:37
3	Maika defeated Konami	Cinderella Tournament First-round match	8:27
4	Unagi Sayaka defeated Natsuko Tora	Cinderella Tournament First-round match	6:51
5	Rina defeated AZM (Note: Rina replaced Saki Kashima due to the latter not being able to make her presence to the show.)	Cinderella Tournament First-round match	4:40
6	Starlight Kid defeated Momo Watanabe	Cinderella Tournament First-round match	6:23
7	Mayu Iwatani defeated Fukigen Death	Cinderella Tournament First-round match	4:16
8	Giulia defeated Ruaka	Cinderella Tournament First-round match	4:21
9	Utami Hayashishita defeated Mina Shirakawa	Cinderella Tournament First-round match	8:59
10	Saya Kamitani defeated Tam Nakano by over the top rope	Cinderella Tournament First-round match	5:48
11	Syuri defeated Natsupoi	Cinderella Tournament First-round match	9:26

Night 2 (May 14)
No.	Results	Stipulations	Times
1	Natsupoi defeated Lady C, Tam Nakano and Hanan	Four-way match	5:17
2	Oedo Tai (Fukigen Death, Konami and Natsuko Tora) defeated Queen's Quest (AZM, Hina and Momo Watanabe)	Six-woman tag team match	5:11
3	Saya Kamitani defeated Starlight Kid	Cinderella Tournament Second-round match	7:05
4	Maika defeated Giulia	Cinderella Tournament Second-round match	7:38
5	Syuri defeated Utami Hayashishita	Cinderella Tournament Second-round match	6:17
6	Himeka defeated Mayu Iwatani	Cinderella Tournament Quarter-finals match	6:14
7	Mina Shirakawa defeated Ruaka	Future of Stardom Championship tournament match	5:01
8	Unagi Sayaka defeated Syuri	Cinderella Tournament Quarter-finals match	8:40

Night 3 - Tokyo Dream Cinderella (June 12)
No.	Results	Stipulations	Times
1^{P}	Rina defeated Hina and Lady C	Three-way match	5:43
2^{P}	Maika defeated Unagi Sayaka	Cinderella Tournament Semi-finals match	8:05
3	AZM and Natsupoi defeated Mina Shirakawa and Momo Watanabe and Giulia and Tam Nakano	Three-way shuffle tag team match	12:58
4	Oedo Tai (Fukigen Death, Konami, Natsuko Tora, Ruaka and Saki Kashima) defeated Stars (Hanan, Koguma, Mayu Iwatani, Starlight Kid and Rin Kadokura)	Ten-woman elimination tag team match The last person eliminated must to join the enemy unit. Since Starlight Kid was eliminated last, she was forced to join Oedo Tai. (Note: Starlight Kid was given the option to choose between removing her mask or joining Oedo Tai and it was the latter which she chose.)	17:57
5	Saya Kamitani defeated Himeka	Cinderella Tournament Semi-finals match	8:51
6	Saya Kamitani defeated Maika	Cinderella Tournament Finals match	15:05
7	Utami Hayashishita (c) vs. Syuri ended in a time limit draw	Singles match for the World of Stardom Championship	30:00
8	Utami Hayashishita (c) vs. Syuri ended by double knockout (Note: The match was restarted and was sanctioned as only one defense for Hayashishita.)	Singles match for the World of Stardom Championship	13:19
(c) / – the champion(s) heading into the match; P / – the match was broadcast on the pre-show
