= Yokohama Dream Cinderella 2021 in Summer =

2021 World Wonder Ring Stardom event

- Promotional poster featuring Mayu Iwatani, Giulia, Utami Hayashishita and Tam Nakano
- Promotion: World Wonder Ring Stardom
- Date: July 4, 2021
- City: Yokohama, Japan
- Venue: Yokohama Budokan
- Attendance: 1,135

Event chronology
← Previous; Cinderella Tournament 2021	Next → 5 Star Grand Prix 2021

Yokohama Dream Cinderella 2021 in Summer (夏の横浜ドリームシンデレラ2021, Natsu no Yokohama dorīmushinderera 2021), was a professional wrestling event promoted by World Wonder Ring Stardom. It took place on July 4, 2021 in Yokohama, Japan, at the Yokohama Budokan with a limited attendance due in part to the ongoing COVID-19 pandemic at the time. The preshow was broadcast on the Stardom's YouTube channel. The event was available via pay-per-view also featuring English commentary.

== Storylines ==
The show featured six professional wrestling matches that resulted from scripted storylines, where wrestlers portrayed villains, heroes, or less distinguishable characters in the scripted events that built tension and culminated in a wrestling match or series of matches.

The third night of the Stardom Cinderella Tournament 2021 which took place on June 12 saw Saya Kamitani defeating Himeka in the semi-finals of the tournament and finally Maika in the finals to become the Cinderella Tournament winner of 2021. Kamitani issued a challenge to Tam Nakano for the Wonder of Stardom Championship as her granted wish for winning the tournament which Nakano immediately accepted. On the night of the event, Kamitani fell short to Nakano, failing to win the Wonder of Stardom Championship, and shortly after that, Starlight Kid issued a new challenge to the champion dressed in full purple, hinting that she fully embraced Oedo Tai.

After the event, Unagi Sayaka was declared as the next challenger for Syuri's SWA World Championship.

The main event saw Queen's Quest's leader Utami Hayashishita taking on Natsuko Tora for the World of Stardom Championship. However, the Oedo Tai's leader suffered a knee injury during the match with the doctors having no choice but to stop the match prematurely. Therefore, Hayashishita marked her sixth successful title defense in a row.

=== Future of Stardom Championship Tournament ===
Due to Saya Iida relinquishing the Future of Stardom Championship after suffering an injury, a seven-woman tournament to crown a new champion was announced to kick off on the second night of the Stardom Cinderella Tournament 2021 on May 14, 2021. The final took place on July 4, the night of the event, where Mina Shirakawa defeated her Cosmic Angels stablemate Unagi Sayaka to win the vacant title. Shirakawa became a double champion after winning the Future of Stardom Championship, while simultaneously holding the Artist of Stardom Championship alongside Sayaka and Tam Nakano.

Round 1 (May 14, 15, June 8)
Mina Shirakawa	5:01
Ruaka	Pin
Rina	5:43
Hina	Pin
Unagi Sayaka	6:21
Lady C	Pin

Round 2 (June 8)
Mina Shirakawa	7:50
Hina	Pin
Unagi Sayaka	8:53
Hanan	Pin

Final (July 4)
Mina Shirakawa	Pin
Unagi Sayaka	16:58

== Results ==
No.	Results	Stipulations	Times
1^{P}	Oedo Tai (Fukigen Death and Konami) defeated Hanan and Hina, Lady C and Maika, and Oedo Tai (Rina and Saki Kashima)	Gauntlet tag team match	6:31
2	Queen's Quest (AZM and Momo Watanabe) defeated Oedo Tai (Ruaka and Starlight Kid)	Tag team match	13:43
3	Mina Shirakawa defeated Unagi Sayaka	Tournament final match for the vacant Future of Stardom Championship	16:58
4	Alto Livello Kabaliwan (Giulia and Syuri) (c) defeated Stars (Mayu Iwatani and Koguma)	Tag team match for the Goddesses of Stardom Championship	20:42
5	Tam Nakano (c) defeated Saya Kamitani	Singles match for the Wonder of Stardom Championship	22:27
6	Utami Hayashishita (c) defeated Natsuko Tora by doctor stoppage (Note: Tora suffered a legitimate knee injury and the match had to be stopped.)	Singles match for the World of Stardom Championship	11:33
(c) / – the champion(s) heading into the match; P / – the match was broadcast on the pre-show
