= Stardom Halloween Dark Night =

2023 World Wonder Ring Stardom event

- Promotional poster of the event
- Promotion: World Wonder Ring Stardom
- Date: October 29, 2023
- City: Tokyo, Japan
- Venue: Tachikawa Stage Garden
- Attendance: 1,116
- Tagline: "House Of Terror"

Event chronology
← Previous; Nagoya Golden Fight	Next → New Blood West 1

Stardom Halloween Dark Night (スターダム ハロウィン ダークナイト, Sutādamu harō~in dākunaito) was a professional wrestling event promoted by World Wonder Ring Stardom. The event took place on October 29, 2023, in Tokyo, Japan at the Tachikawa Stage Garden. The event was dubbed as a non-canon show, similar to the Stardom in Showcase shows.

Seven matches were contested at the event, including one on the pre-show. The main event saw Yuu, Megan Bayne and Maika defeat Mayu Iwatani in a Coffin match.

== Production ==
=== Background ===
The show will featured seven professional wrestling matches that result from scripted storylines, where wrestlers portray villains, heroes, or less distinguishable characters in the scripted events that build tension and culminate in a wrestling match or series of matches.

=== Event ===
The event started with the preshow confrontation between Syuri and Saki Kashima, and Risa Sera and Hiragi Kurumi of the Goddesses of Stardom Tag League group stage, solded with the victory of the latter team. The bout was broadcast live on Stardom's YouTube channel.

In the first main card bout, Super Strong Stardom Machine won a "zombie" Rumble match by last eliminating a masked zombie. Next up, Dump Matsumoto and Zap defeated Mina Shirakawa and Waka Tsukiyama in a "zombie" Lumberjack match. In the fourth bout, Suzu Suzuki defeated Momo Watanabe, Mei Seira and Thekla in a four-way "Trick or Treat" Falls Count Anywhere Match. Next up, Saori Anou defeated Natsuko Tora, Hazuki and Mai Sakurai in a four-way "Halloween Weapons" Match. In the semi main event, Wonder of Stardom Champion Mirai fought the masked silhouette who kept attacking her for weeks prior to the event in a no contest. The mystery opponent revealed to be Oedo Tai's Ruaka after Mirai unmasked her during the bout.

In the main event, IWGP Women's Champion Mayu Iwatani fought Yuu, Megan Bayne and Maika who came down to the ring under masks. The bout ended with the victory of the latter three, after they put Iwatani alongside executive Rossy Ogawa in the coffin.

== Results ==
No.	Results	Stipulations	Times
1^{P}	Prominence (Hiragi Kurumi and Risa Sera) defeated Anecon (Saki Kashima and Syuri) by pinfall	Goddesses of Stardom Tag League group stage match	9:24
2	Super Strong Stardom Machine won by last eliminating Zombie A (Note: Participants in order of elimination: Fukigen Death, Karma, Ram Kaicho, Super Strong Stardom Big Machine, Zombie C, Zombie B, Super Strong Stardom Giant Machine No. 2, 2nd Generation Sexy Dynamite Princess, and Zombie A.)	"Zombie" Rumble match	15:19
3	Vulgar Alliance (Zap and Dump Matsumoto) defeated Moonlight Venus (Waka Tsukiyama and Mina Shirakawa) by pinfall	"Zombie" Lumberjack match	8:33
4	Suzu Suzuki defeated Thekla, Momo Watanabe and Mei Seira by pinfall (Note: Koguma was also scheduled to compete in the match but pulled out due to injury.)	Four-way "Trick or Treat" Falls Count Anywhere match	8:18
5	Saori Anou defeated Mai Sakurai, Natsuko Tora and Hazuki by pinfall	Four-way "Halloween Weapons" match	11:29
6	Mirai vs. Halloween Mask (Note: Several weeks prior to the event, a masked sihlouette attacked Mirai. The mysterious entity was revealed to be Ruaka.) ended in a no contest	Singles match	4:35
7	Yuu, Megan Bayne and Maika defeated Mayu Iwatani	Coffin match	7:16
P / – the match was broadcast on the pre-show
