= Stardom New Blood West 1 =

2023 World Wonder Ring Stardom event

New Blood West 1
- Promotional art work of the event
- Promotion: World Wonder Ring Stardom
- Date: November 17, 2023
- City: Osaka, Japan
- Venue: Azalea Taisho Hall
- Attendance: 278

Event chronology
← Previous; Halloween Dark Night	Next → Gold Rush 2023

New Blood chronology
← Previous; New Blood 11	Next → New Blood 12

Stardom New Blood West 1 (スターダム ニュー ブラッド ウェスト 1, Sutādamu nyū Buraddo u~esuto 1) was a professional wrestling event promoted by World Wonder Ring Stardom. The event took place on November 17, 2023, in Osaka, Japan, at the Azalea Taisho Hall.

Eight matches were contested at the event. The main event saw Rina successfully defend the Future of Stardom Championship against Hanako.

== Production ==
=== Background ===
"New Blood" is a series of events that mainly focus on matches where rookie wrestlers, usually with three or fewer years of in-ring experience, evolve. Besides wrestlers from Stardom, various superstars from multiple promotions of the Japanese independent scene are invited to compete in bouts that are usually going under the stipulation of singles or tag team matches.

The show featured eight professional wrestling matches that result from scripted storylines, where wrestlers portray villains, heroes, or less distinguishable characters in the scripted events that build tension and culminate in a wrestling match or series of matches. The event's press conference took place on November 1, 2023, and was broadcast live on Stardom's YouTube channel.

=== Event ===
The entire event was available for free and broadcast live on Stardom's YouTube channel. It started with the bout between the debuting Yuzuki and Oedo Tai's Momo Watanabe, solded with the victory of the latter. In the second bout, half of the New Blood Tag Team Champions Saya Iida defeated one third of the Artist of Stardom Champions Mai Sakurai. Next up, Suzu Suzuki picked up a win over Cosmic Angels' Yuna Mizumori in singles competition. In the fourth bout, God's Eye's Ami Sourei defeated Evolution's Zones. Next up, half of the New Blood Tag Team Champions Hanan went into a time-limit draw against High Speed Champion Mei Seira. Next, Momoka Hanazono picked up a win over Queen's Quest's Lady C in singles competition. In the semi main event, Miyu Amasaki defeated ChiChi of Evolution in another singles bout.

In the main event, Rina submitted Hanako to retain the Future of Stardom Championship for the fourth time consecutively in that respective reign.

== Results ==
No.	Results	Stipulations	Times
1	Momo Watanabe defeated Yuzuki (Note: Made her in-ring debut on the night of the event.)	Singles match	10:08
2	Saya Iida defeated Mai Sakurai	Singles match	8:39
3	Suzu Suzuki defeated Yuna Mizumori	Singles match	7:40
4	Ami Sourei defeated Zones	Singles match	7:56
5	Hanan vs. Mei Seira ended in a time limit draw	Singles match	15:00
6	Momoka Hanazono defeated Lady C	Singles match	9:46
7	Miyu Amasaki defeated ChiChi	Singles match	5:43
8	Rina (c) defeated Hanako by submission	Singles match for the Future of Stardom Championship	12:12
(c) / – the champion(s) heading into the match
