= Oedo Tai =

Professional wrestling stable

- Oedo Tai official logo (2020–2024)

Stable
- Former members: See below
- Debut: January 18, 2015
- Disbanded: July 28, 2024
- Years active: 2015–2024

Oedo Tai (大江戸隊, Ōedo-tai; lit. 'Great Edo Corps'; stylized OEDotai) was a villainous professional wrestling stable mainly performing in the Japanese professional wrestling promotion World Wonder Ring Stardom and the Japanese independent scene between 2015 and 2024.

== History ==
=== Under Kyoko Kimura and Act Yasukawa (2015) ===
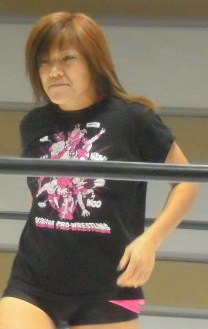
One of the first co-leaders of the unit, Kyoko Kimura.

The group originally formed after Kimura Monster Gun's Kyoko Kimura, Kris Wolf and Hudson Envy joined forces with Act Yasukawa, Dragonita and Heidi Lovelace following the events of Stardom's 4th Anniversary show on January 18, 2015, defining themselves as the founding members of the unit. With Yasukawa and Kimura acting as co-leaders, they rebranded themselves with a Samurai theme due to Act, who was "The Samurai Spirit" of Stardom. Yasukawa won the Wonder of Stardom Championship the same night after defeating Mayu Iwatani. The first match under the Oedo Tai name saw Yasukawa, Hudson Envy and Kimura defeating Heisei-gun (Mayu Iwatani, Takumi Iroha and Yoshiko) in a six-woman tag team match on the second night of the Stardom New Year Stars 2015 which took place on February 1. On February 8, at Stardom Queen's Shout, the unit went for the first time after tag team gold, as Dragonita, Heidi Lovelace and Hudson Envy unsuccessfully challenged Heisei-gun (Io Shirai, Iwatani and Iroha) for the Artist of Stardom Championship. The rush continued on February 22, at Stardom Queen's Shout, Kimura and Hudson Envy teamed up and unsuccessfully challenged 7Kairi (Kairi Hojo and Nanae Takahashi) for the Goddesses of Stardom Championship.

==== Yasukawa vs. Yoshiko incident ====
Yasukawa was in a feud with Yoshiko, whom she challenged for the World of Stardom Championship on February 22. Things got off-script during the match, while Yoshiko legitimately attacked and injured Yasukawa, therefore getting stripped of the title and being suspended for an indefinite period. Yasukawa, who was the Wonder of Stardom Champion at the time had to furtherly relinquish the title on May 1, due to complications from her multiple injuries caused by the incident. Three days later from the occurrence, Stardom held a press conference where Yoshiko apologised for her actions, but subsequently remained suspended.

On the fifth night of the Stardom Grows Up Star 2015 on April 12, Thunder Rosa teamed up with Kris Wolf to defeat Mayu Iwatani and Momo Watanabe, match which would mark her debut in the promotion as part of the stable. On the second night of the Stardom Golden Week Stars 2015 which took place on May 6, Star Fire marked her debut in the unit by teaming up with Kris Wolf in a losing effort to Io Shirai and Mayu Iwatani in the semi-finals of a tournament to crown new Goddesses of Stardom Champions. Nikki Storm also made her first appearance in Stardom as part of the unit on June 14, at Stardom Galaxy Stars 2015, where she teamed up with Star Fire and unsuccessfully challenged Io Shirai and Mayu Iwatani for the Goddesses of Stardom Championship. During the 5★Star Grand Prix 2015 tournament which took place beginning on August 23, La Rosa Negra joined the group, while competing in the B block of the tournament against stablemates Kris Wolf and Hudson Envy, Mayu Iwatani, Kaori Yoneyama and Io Shirai. On September 23, on the eight night of the tournament, La Rosa Negra successfully captured the High Speed Championship from stablemate Star Fire, with no major occurrences after the match. This was the latter's last match in Stardom and as part of Oedo Tai. At Stardom Mask Fiesta 2015 ~ Halloween Party on October 25, La Rosa Negra represented the stable in a six-person masked tag team match where she teamed up with Black Dragon and Kaoru Maeda in a losing effort to Io Shirai, Mayu Iwatani and Último Dragón. At the 2015 edition of the Goddesses of Stardom Tag League, Kris Wolf and Kyoko Kimura teamed up to represent the stable in a first-round match where they fell short to Hiroyo Matsumoto and Santana Garrett on November 11. The other pair which represented Oedo Tai in the competition was the team of Act Yasukawa and the new member of the stable, Holidead, who joined the unit during the event on November 3. The two teamed up on the same night, falling short to Kairi Hojo and Haruka Kato.

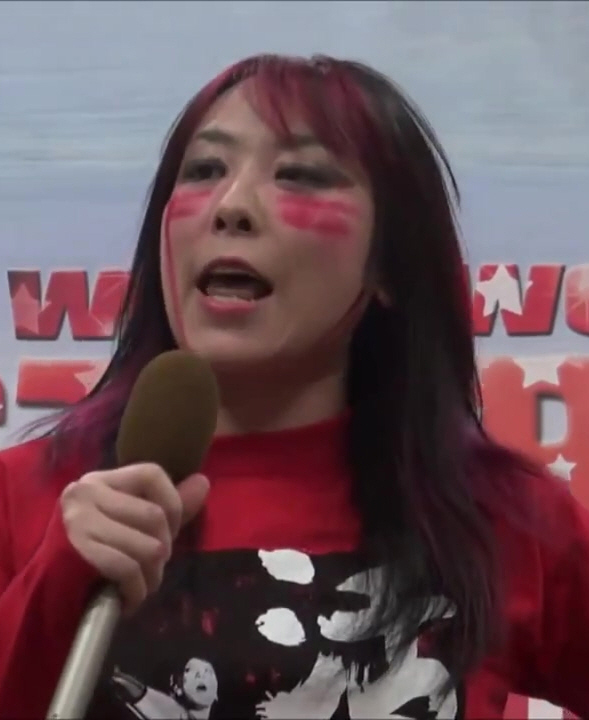
The other first co-leader of the unit, Act Yasukawa.

=== Under Kimura's single leadership (2015–2017) ===
Act Yasukawa returned in the in-ring competition in September 2015 after recovering from the injuries suffered during the incident with Yoshiko, but only for a brief period until December 23, when she announced her retirement from professional wrestling, remaining the manager of the group until early 2016. Kyoko Kimura subsequently remained the sole leader of the unit since then, and spent her time recruiting a handful of wrestlers in the first couple of months. The unit always had their doors open for new competitors from outside of Japan.

On the first night of the Stardom 5th Anniversary on January 17, 2016, Kaitlin Diemond and Viper debuted in the stable by teaming up against Hyper Destroyers (Evie and Kellie Skater), obtaining the no. 1 contendership for the Goddesses of Stardom Championship, match which they would lose three days later to the champions Thunder Rock (Io Shirai and Mayu Iwatani). On the fifth night of the Stardom Grows Up Stars 2016 on April 17, the luchadora Diosa Atenea teamed up with Kyoko Kimura as the new recruit of the unit, picking up a victory against Kagetsu and Lizzy Styles. The true purpose of the match was that Kimura tried to recruit Kagetsu in the stable but yet unsuccessfully. Six days later at Stardom Grows Up Stars 2016 - Kairi Hojo Homecoming on April 23, Kagetsu finally joined the stable and teamed up with Kyoko Kimura being accompanied at ring side by Act Yasukawa, to defeat Hiroyo Matsumoto and Jungle Kyona. On May 29, on the first night of the Stardom Shining Stars 2016 event, Leah Vaughan became the newest recruit of the unit as she teamed up with Kagetsu, Kris Wolf and Diosa Atenea to defeat Jungle Kyona and Thunder Rock (Io Shirai and Mayu Iwatani) in a six-man tag team match. The unit captured the first tag team gold at Stardom Premium Stars 2016 on June 16, when Kyoko Kimura and Kagetsu defeated Thunder Rock (Io Shirai and Mayu Iwatani) for the Goddesses of Stardom Championship. On September 22, on the eight night of the Stardom 5★Star Grand Prix 2016, Kyoko Kimura and Kagetsu would team up with a mystery wrestler to go against JKGReeeeN (Jungle Kyona and Momo Watanabe) and Mayu Iwatani. That mystery partner was Hana Kimura, Kyoko's daughter who subsequently joined the stable. The three members of the unit picked up the victory. They would eventually become the strongest sub-group of the unit after winning the Artist of Stardom Championship for the first time at Stardom in Shin-Kiba Taikai on October 2, by defeating Threedom (Io Shirai, Kairi Hojo and Mayu Iwatani). Late in 2016, Kimura injured her wrist, which led to her going on a hiatus to recover.

Kyoko Kimura and Kagetsu represented the unit outside of Stardom at WAVE Happy New Year 2017 on January 8, an event promoted by Pro Wrestling Wave where they unsuccessfully challenged Misaki Ohata and Ryo Mizunami for the Wave Tag Team Championship.

=== Under Kagetsu (2017–2020) ===
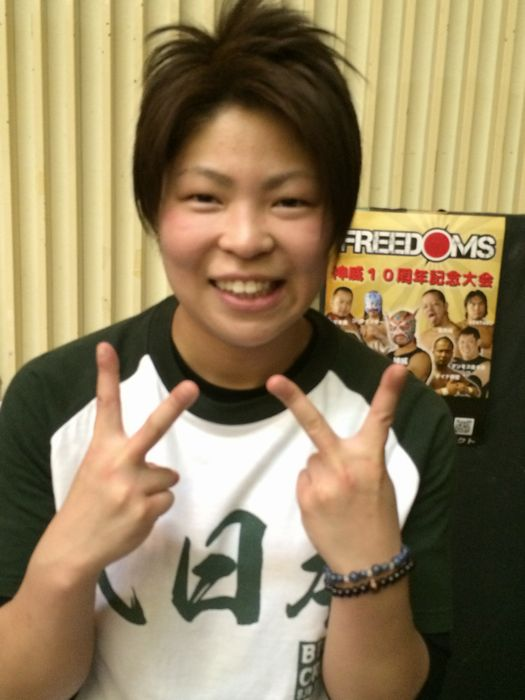
The third leader of the new Oedo Tai, Kagetsu.

Kyoko Kimura retired from professional wrestling on January 22, 2017, at the Kyoko Kimura Retirement Produce Last Afro, an event promoted by the Japanese independent scene where she teamed up with Hana and her husband, mixed martial artist Isao Kobayashi in a losing effort to Aja Kong, Meiko Satomura & Minoru Suzuki. Kagetsu was handed Kyoko's jitte, symbolizing the start of his leadership. Along with Hana, Kris Wolf and others, they kept the Oedo Tai name going, but the group started to fall apart. Wolf took off for some international matches and Kagetsu more or less looked like he also retired. Hana was left alone and struggled to keep the unit active while taking the leadership for several months. She challenged Mayu Iwatani for the Wonder of Stardom Championship title at Stardom Shining Stars 2017 on June 11, with an extra stipulation. If Hana won, Mayu would join Oedo Tai, but if Mayu won, Oedo Tai would be forced to disband. The match ended in a no-contest when Kagetsu returned attacking Mayu and the referee. Right after that, Wolf returned after being away for a couple of months. Thunder Rosa, La Rosa Negra and Holidead would also emigrate from Japan to wrestle in the American scene and subsequently left the unit in May. After those several departures, the unit suffered a slight gimmick change as the second generation of Oedo Tai was truly born.

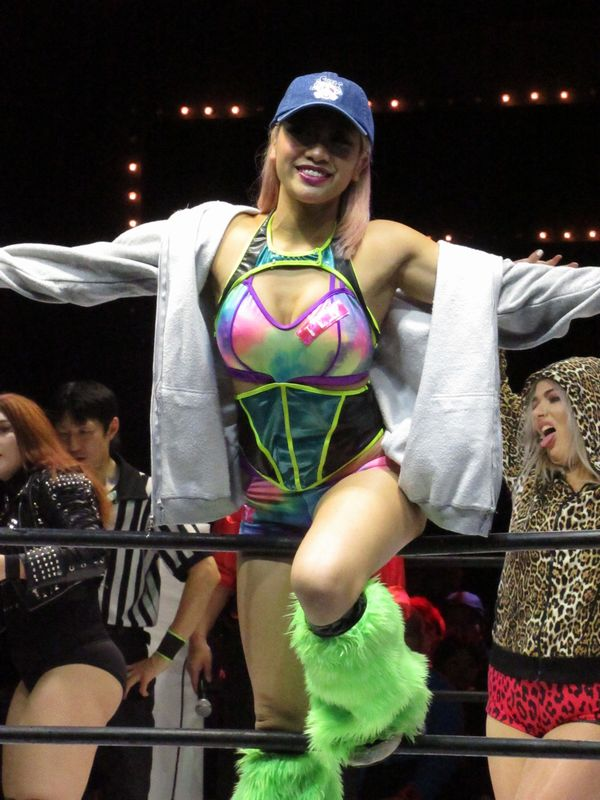
For a brief period Hana Kimura was the only active member of Oedo Tai.

Kagetsu reinvented his look after returning on the fourth night of the Stardom Shining Stars 2017 on June 21, where he teamed up with Hana Kimura to defeat Hiroyo Matsumoto and Jungle Kyona for the Goddesses of Stardom Championship. Due to limiting themselves to a trio, Kagetsu, Wolf and Hana Kimura would look for new recruits as they brought Tam Nakano to the unit on September 10, during the 5STAR Grand Prix. Another member presented by Kagetsu on November 4, during the Goddesses of Stardom Tag League was Sumire Natsu who came from Pro Wrestling Wave.

Unfortunately Tam Nakano was forced to leave the stable and join Queen's Quest after being eliminated the last in a 10-woman elimination tag team match which occurred on January 21, 2018, at Stardom 7th Anniversary. On March 25, Wolf left Stardom and subsequently Oedo Tai due to visa issues which prevented her to wrestle in Japan anymore. On April 15, HZK, Martina and Nao Yamaguchi joined the uint after the 2018 Stardom Drafts. On June 9, at Stardom Shining Stars, Kagetsu defeated Toni Storm to win the World of Stardom Championship. The stable made a couple of brief appearances in the American independent scene. On June 29, HZK, Kagetsu and Hana Kimura represented the stable at Best in the World 2018, an event promoted by Ring of Honor. At ROH Wrestling #358 on June 30, Hana Kimura and Kagetsu teamed up to defeat Jenny Rose and Mayu Iwatani. During Kagetsu's final match in the 2018 5 Star Grand Prix on September 24, Kimura betrayed Oedo Tai by attacking Kagetsu with a chair, causing Kagetsu to lose and fail to reach the finals. Following the match, Kimura declared that she was no longer affiliated with Oedo Tai. This would lead to a showdown between the two at Stardom True Fight 2018 in a no disqualification match that saw both new enemies collide in the Korakuen Hall. The match would end via referee's decision as Kagetsu got a measure of revenge over the new Hana Kimura who would later join the Tokyo Cyber Squad stable.

On the fourth night of the Stardom Shining Stars 2019 on January 2, Kagetsu, Sumire Natsu and HZK teamed up to face Jamie Hayter, Hana Kimura and Bobbi Tyler of Tokyo Cyber Squad in a six-man tag team match in which Hayter betrayed Kimura and Tyler, providing the victory of Oedo Tai's members. The Pro-Wrestling: EVE's member joined the unit right after the match. The stable was growing again, with Sendai Girls' Pro Wrestling's Andras Miyagi joining at Stardom Queen's Fest on February 17, as the "X", (that being the mystery tag team partner called by Stardom) of Kagetsu in the tag team match against JAN (Jungle Kyona and Natsuko Tora) which they won. After the 2019 drafts from April 14, Sumire Natsu, HZK and Andras Miyagi teamed up to defeat JAN (Natsuko Tora, Leo Onozaki and Saya Iida). Due to the draft results, Tora switched factions as she joined Oedo Tai Andras Miyagi was kicked out of the group after dropping the Artist of Stardom Championship alongside Kagetsu and Sumire Natsu to Queen's Quest's AZM, Momo Watanabe and Utami Hayashishita. HZK announced her retirement from professional wrestling took place on December 24, at Stardom Year-End Climax, where she fell short to Tora in a singles match.

On January 3, 2020, Saki Kashima betrayed Mayu Iwatani and Stars in a match against the one-time reformed tag team from Hana Kimura and Kagetsu, and joined the stable at the request of Natsu and Tora. On January 19, at the Stardom 9th Anniversary, Bea Priestley teamed up with Jamie Hayter to defeat Tokyo Cyber Squad's Jungle Kyona and Konami for the Goddesses of Stardom Championship. Priestley later turned heel on Queen's Quest on the same night, joining Oedo Tai.

=== Under Natsuko Tora (2020–2024) ===
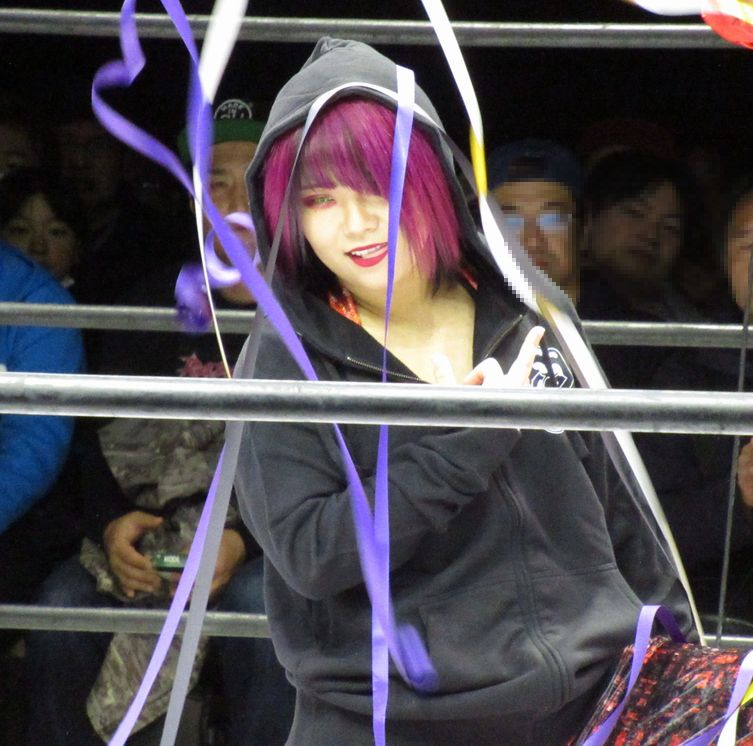
Fourth and final leader of the unit, Natsuko Tora.

Kagetsu announced his retirement from professional wrestling on December 25, 2019. His last match in Stardom took place on the sixth night of the New Years Stars 2020, on February 15, 2020, where he faced all the promotion's roster in a 25-woman gauntlet match also involving popular competitors such as Hiroyo Matsumoto, Arisa Hoshiki, Leo Onozaki and others. Kagetsu handed over the reins of Oedo Tai upon his retirement, and he even symbolically passed the torch by giving Natsuko Tora his trademark jutte. Tora adopted a new look and took Oedo Tai back to its roots as a heel faction, starting the third generation. Due to the COVID-19 pandemic, Bea Priestley and Jamie Hayter became unable to perform for Stardom, and therefore the Goddesses of Stardom Championship was vacated. Priestley returned to Stardom on September 19, where she attacked Saya Iida during Iida's match against Tora. On October 3 at Yokohama Cinderella 2020, Konami teamed up with her fellow Tokyo Cyber Squad stablemate Jungle Kyona against Tora and Saki Kashima in a match where the losing unit had to disband. Konami turned on Kyona as she helped Tora and Kashima win the match, and later join the unit after Tokyo Cyber Squad's dissolution. At the 2020 Goddesses of Stardom Tag League, several members of the unit worked as teams of two in the tournament: Black Widows (Konami and Priestley) and Devil Duo (Kashima and Tora). On October 29, Rina left Stars to join Oedo Tai. At Sendai Cinderella 2020 on November 15, Priestley lost the SWA World Championship to Syuri.

On February 20, 2021, Kashima, Konami, Priestley, and Tora teamed up to face Stars (Gokigen Death, Mayu Iwatani, Ruaka and Starlight Kid) in an eight-woman tag team match. During the match, Ruaka turned on Iwatani to help Oedo Tai win the match. They later recruited her as the newest member of the unit. At All Star Dream Cinderella on March 3, Kashima and Tora lost to MaiHime, failing to win the Goddesses of Stardom Championship. At Yokohama Dream Cinderella 2021 on April 4, Tora, Ruaka, Konami, Kashima and Rina defeated Stars (Mayu Iwatani, Saya Iida, Starlight Kid, Hanan and Gokigen Death) in a ten-woman elimination tag team match, and since Gokigen Death was the last one eliminated, she was forced to join Oedo Tai. Kagetsu and HZK made one-off in-ring returns at the Hana Kimura Memorial Show on May 23. They teamed up with Konami and Death yama-san who portrayed the Tokyo Cyber Squad in a losing effort to Asuka, Syuri, Natsupoi, and Mio Momono. On the third night of the 2021 Cinderella Tournament on June 12, Tora, Konami, Gokigen Death, Ruaka and Kashima teamed up to defeat Stars (Mayu Iwatani, Starlight Kid, Hanan, Koguma and Rin Kadokura) in a ten-woman elimination tag team match, and since Starlight Kid was lastly eliminated, she was forced to join Oedo Tai. At Yokohama Dream Cinderella 2021 in Summer on July 4, Tora unsuccessfully challenged Utami Hayashishita for the World of Stardom Championship, losing by doctor stoppage after sustaining a knee injury during the match. On September 30, Stardom announced Sumire Natsu's departure from the company and subsequently parted ways with the stable. At Stardom 10th Anniversary Grand Final Osaka Dream Cinderella on October 9, Ruaka defeated Unagi Sayaka to win the Future of Stardom Championship.

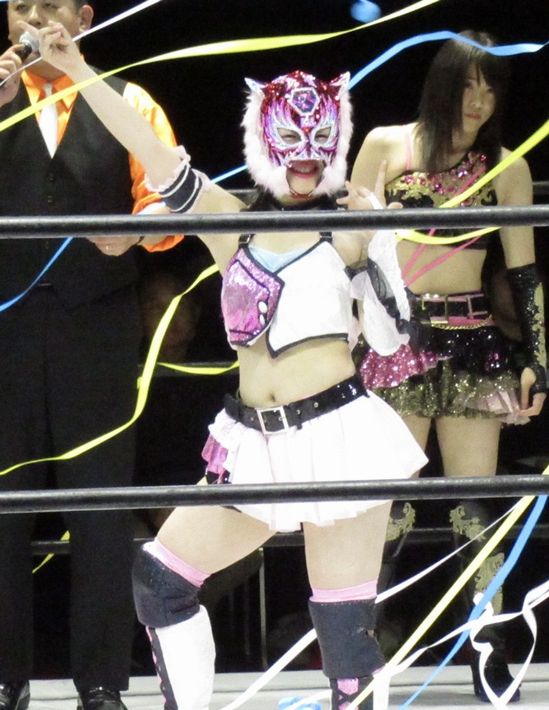
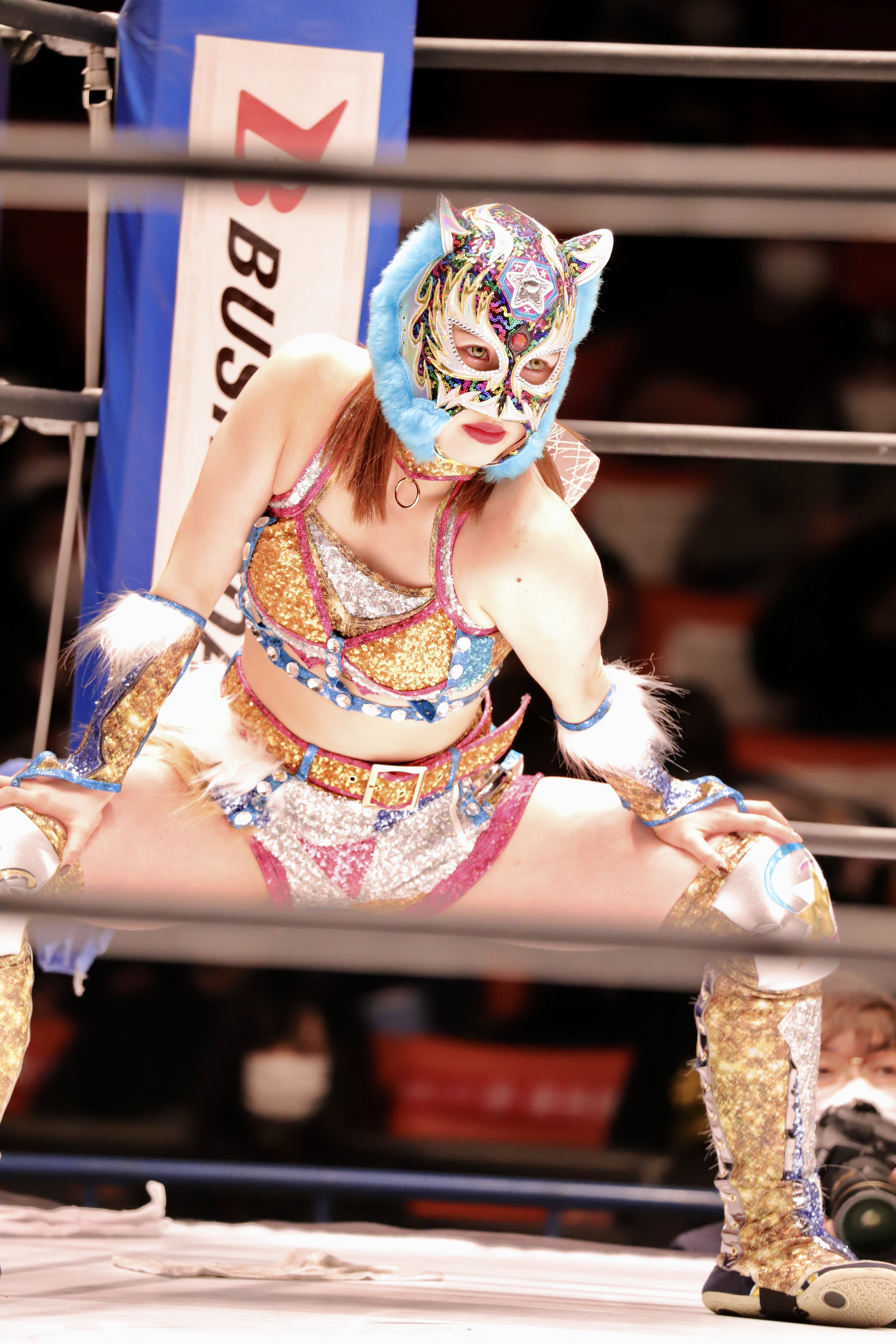
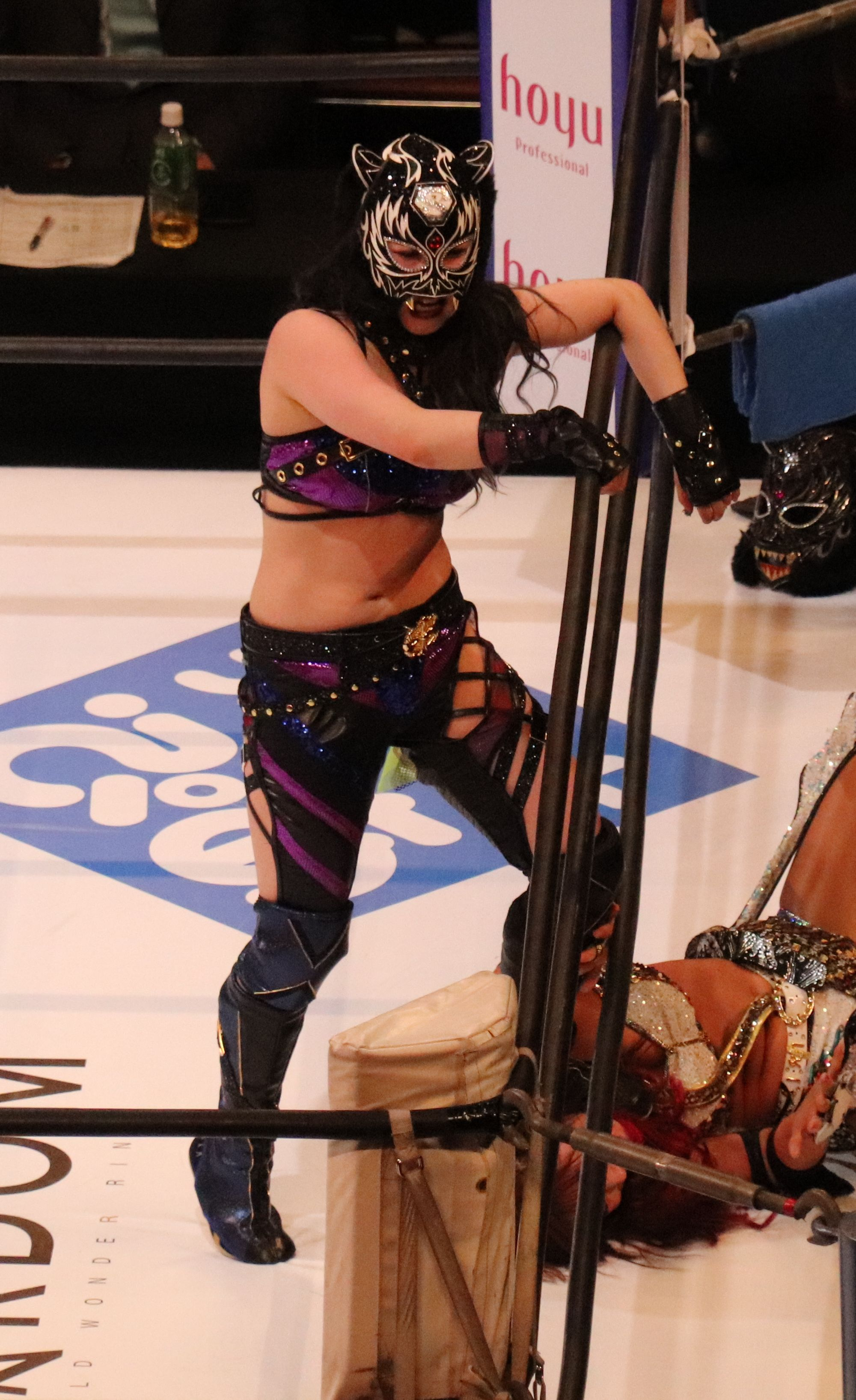
After defecting Stars, Starlight Kid switched from her light-coloured masks (left 2019 and center 2020) to a darker one (right, 2022) to depict her embracing the dark side of Oedo Tai. Her mask style is inspired by Tiger Mask.

Queen's Quest's leader, Momo Watanabe, had been the victim of Starlight Kid's mind games as the latter's strategy to gain more recruits into Oedo Tai since Kawasaki Super Wars on November 3. Their feud degenerated into an eight-woman elimination tag team match in which both of them would be the captains of their respective teams. The loser captain would be forced to join the enemy unit and if Starlight Kid lost she would also have to unmask. The match took place on December 18, at Osaka Super Wars. With the match coming down to the wire and Queen's Quest holding a 2 to 1 advantage over Starlight Kid, Momo Watanabe betrayed her faction and hit her long-time tag team partner AZM over the head with a chair, handing the win to Oedo Tai and anointing herself the "Black Peach" of Oedo Tai. At Dream Queendom on December 29, Konami faced a returning Giulia in a losing effort as her last match before a planned hiatus from professional wrestling.

At Nagoya Supreme Fight on January 29, 2022, Watanabe and Starlight Kid battled Queen's Quest's Utami Hayashishita and AZM in a winning effort as a result of a grudge tag team match. At Cinderella Journey on February 23, Starlight Kid lost the High Speed Championship to AZM. On the first night of the World Climax 2022 from March 26, Watanabe teaming up with Starlight Kid as Black Desire succeeded in defeating FWC to win the Goddesses of Stardom Championship. At Golden Week Fight Tour on May 5, Black Desire lost the Goddesses of Stardom Championship back to FWC. At Flashing Champions on May 28, Kashima, Watanabe and Starlight Kid defeated MaiHimePoi to win the Artist of Stardom Championship. At Fight in the Top on June 26, Kashima, Starlight Kid and Watanabe successfully defended the Artist of Stardom Championship against God's Eye (Syuri, Ami Sourei and Mirai) and Donna Del Mondo (Giulia, Maika and Mai Sakurai). At Mid Summer Champions in Nagoya from July 24, Starlight Kid, Watanabe and Kashima successfully defended the Artist of Stardom Championship against Donna Del Mondo (Giulia, Maika and Himeka). At Stardom x Stardom: Nagoya Midsummer Encounter on August 21, Kashima, Watanabe and Starlight Kid successfully defended the Artist of Stardom Championship against Cosmic Angels (Mina Shirakawa, Unagi Sayaka and Saki). At New Blood 5 on October 19, Starlight Kid and Ruaka teamed up with Haruka Umesaki to defeat Mirai, Tomoka Inaba and Nanami. Umesaki joined Oedo Tai under the gimmick of Karma. At Hiroshima Goddess Festival on November 3, Tora fell short to Utami Hayashishita in her return match which occurred in order to end their feud which abruptly stopped when Tora got injured on July 4, 2021, and Starlight Kid and Watanabe unsuccessfully challenged meltear for the Goddesses of Stardom Championship. At Dream Queendom 2 on December 29, Tora and Ruaka fought in a three-way match to determine the number one contenders for the Goddesses of Stardom Championship won by MaiHime and also involving The New Eras, and Starlight Kid, Watanabe and Kashima lost the Artist of Stardom Championship to Prominence (Risa Sera, Suzu Suzuki & Hiragi Kurumi).

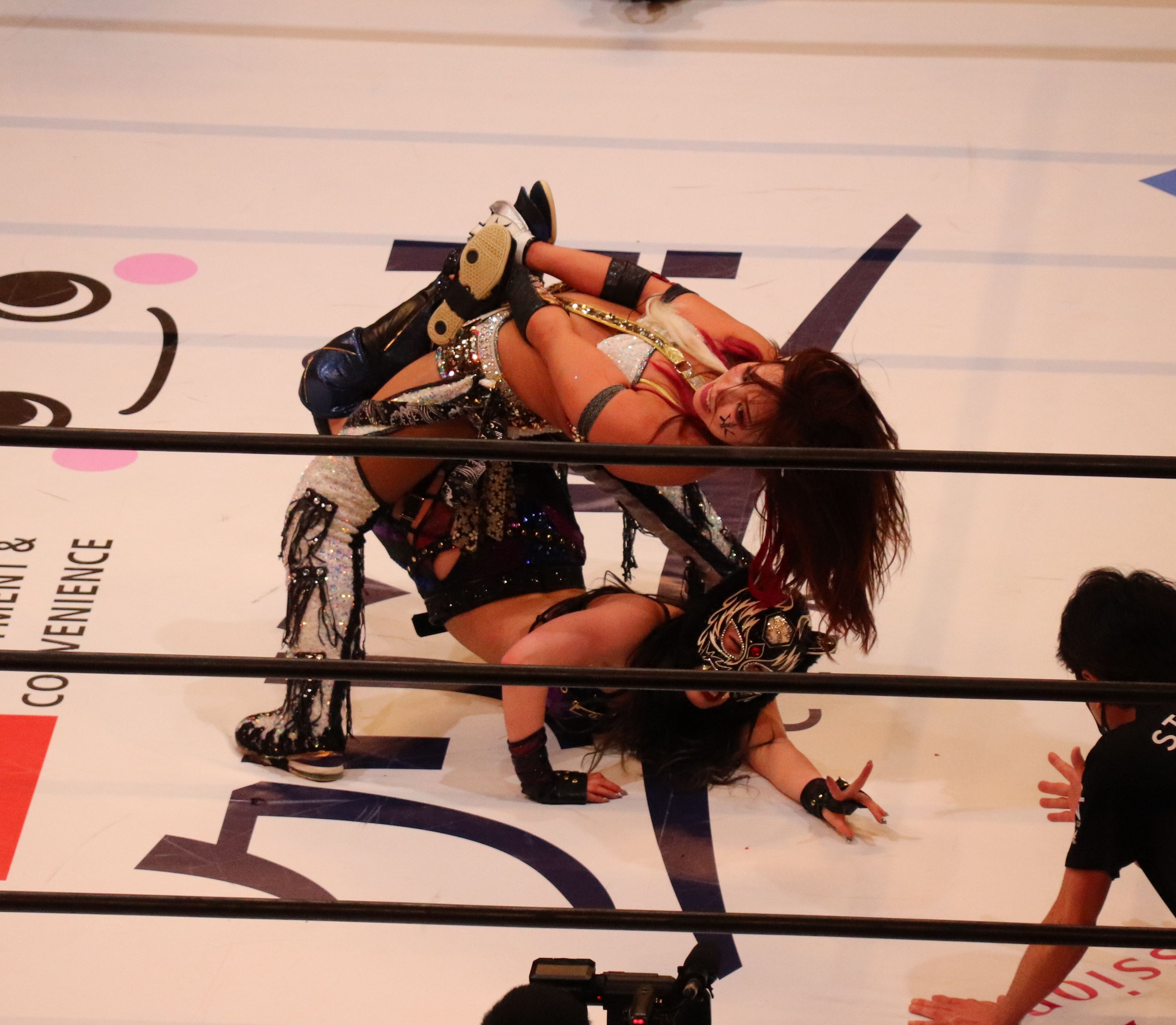
Starlight Kid (bottom) facing Kairi on the second night of the Stardom World Climax 2022 from March 27.

At the 2023 edition of the Triangle Derby I, the stable has been represented by Momo Watanabe, Natsuko Tora, Ruaka, Saki Kashima and Starlight Kid who were divided into two distinctive teams, both failing to qualify for the finals. At Stardom Supreme Fight 2023 on February 4, Starlight Kid, Karma and Ruaka fell short to Hazuki, Saya Iida and Koguma, and Momo Watanabe unsuccessfully challenged Saya Kamitani for the Wonder of Stardom Championship. At Stardom in Showcase vol.4 on February 26, 2023, Natsuko Tora, Starlight Kid and Momo Watanabe fell short to Stars (Mayu Iwatani, Hazuki and Koguma) and Queen's Quest (Utami Hayashishita, Saya Kamitani and Miyu Amasaki) in a Three-way elimination tag team match. In the 2023 edition of the Cinderella Tournament, the stable was represented by Rina, Ruaka, Saki Kashima, Haruka Umesaki, Natsuko Tora and Momo Watanabe, with Watanabe and Tora scoring the best results by making it to the quarterfinals. At Stardom All Star Grand Queendom on April 23, 2023, Ruaka, Momo Watanabe, Natsuko Tora and Saki Kashima defeated Club Venus (Jessie, Mariah May and Xena) and Thekla in eight-woman tag team competition. At Stardom Fukuoka Goddess Legend on May 5, 2023, Natsuko Tora and Momo Watanabe defeated Syuri and Konami. At Stardom New Blood 8 on May 12, 2023, Momo Watanabe defeated Miyu Amasaki, Ruaka fell short to Nanae Takahashi, Karma and Starlight Kid successfully defended the New Blood Tag Team Championship against Lady C and Hanako, and Rina defeated Ami Sohrei to win the Future of Stardom Championship. At Stardom Flashing Champions 2023 on May 28, Starlight Kid, Ruaka and Rina fell short to Hina, Utami Hayashishita and Saya Kamitani, Saki Kashima defeated AZM and Fukigen Death to win the High Speed Championship, and Natsuko Tora and Momo Watanabe unsuccessfully challenged The New Eras (Ami Sourei and Mirai) for the Goddesses of Stardom Championship. At Sunshine 2023 on June 25, Oedo Tai was defeated by Queen's Quest in a six-on-six steel cage match in which the losing unit was forced to lose a member. Kashima was the only member of Oedo Tai left in the cage at the end of the match, which led to her getting attacked by the other members of Oedo Tai and forced to withdraw from the unit. At Stardom Mid Summer Champions 2023 on July 2, 2023, Natsuko Tora, Momo Watanabem Ruaka and Rina fell short to Giulia, Thekla, Mai Sakurai and Maika. In the 2023 edition of the Stardom 5 Star Grand Prix, the stable has been represented by Momo Watanabe, Natsuko Tora and Starlight Kid, with none of them making it to the finals. At Stardom x Stardom: Osaka Summer Team on August 13, 2023, Starlight Kid defeated Natsuko Tora in a 5 Star Grand Prix tournament match. At Stardom Midsummer Festival on August 19, 2023, Natsuko Tora and Ruaka teamed up with Vulgar Alliance (Dump Matsumoto, Zap) to defeat Utami Hayashishita, AZM, Miyu Amasaki and Kyoko Inoue. At Stardom 5Star Special in Hiroshima on September 3, 2023, Momo Watanabe fell short to Utami Hayashishita and Starlight Kid to Tam Nakano in 5 Star Grand Prix tournament matches. At Stardom Dream Tag Festival on September 10, 2023, several stable members competed in shuffled tag team bouts in which they paired up with members from other units. Rina teamed up with Hina in a losing effort against Mai Sakurai and Mirai, Momo Watanabe teamed up with Momo Kohgo and went unsuccessful against The Future (Hanan and Mariah May), and Natsuko Tora teamed up with Hazuki to defeat Nanae Takahashi and stablemate Ruaka. At Stardom Nagoya Golden Fight 2023 on October 9, Momo Watanabe unsuccessfully challenged Mirai for the Wonder of Stardom Championship, while Natsuko Tora went unsuccessful against Tam Nakano for the World of Stardom Championship. At Stardom Halloween Dark Night on October 29, 2023, Momo Watanabe competed in a Four-way "Trick or Treat" Falls Count Anywhere match won by Suzu Suzuki and also involving Thekla and Mei Seira, while Natsuko Tora competed in a Four-way "Halloween Weapons" match won by Saori Anou and also involving Mai Sakurai and Hazuki. At Stardom New Blood West 1 on November 17, 2023, Momo Watanabe defeated Yuzuki], and Rina defeated Hanako to successfully defend the Future of Stardom Championship. At Stardom Gold Rush 2023 on November 18, Natsuko Tora, Momo Watanabe and Ruaka competed in a Six-woman tag team Moneyball tournament where they fell short to Baribari Bombers (Giulia, Thekla and Mai Sakurai) in the semifinals. At Stardom Nagoya Big Winter on December 2, 2023, Ruaka fell short to Mai Sakurai, and Natsuko Tora, Starlight Kid and Momo Watanabe defeated Abarenbo GE (Syuri, Mirai and Ami Sourei). At Stardom Dream Queendom 2023 on December 29, Starlight Kid, Ruaka, Rina and Fukigen Death fell short to Mayu Iwatani, Hanan, Hazuki and Saya Iida, and Natsuko Tora and Momo Watanabe unsuccessfully challenged AphrOditE (Utami Hayashishita and Saya Kamitani) for the Goddesses of Stardom Championship.

In the 2024 edition of the Triangle Derby which took place at Stardom New Year Stars 2024 on January 3, the stable was represented by Natsuko Tora, Momo Watanabe and Starlight Kid who made it to the semifinals where they fell short to Abarenbo GE (Syuri, Mirai and Ami Sohrei). At Ittenyon Stardom Gate on January 4, 2024, Starlight Kid, Fukigen Death and Rina fell short to Hazuki, Hanan and Saya Iida, while Natsuko Tora, Momo Watanabe and Ruaka fell short to Saori Anou, Yuna Mizumori and Saki. At Stardom Supreme Fight 2024 on February 4, Rina defeated Yuzuki to retain the Future of Stardom Championship, Natsuko Tora and Momo Watanabe defeated Lady C and Miyu Amasaki, and Starlight Kid unsuccessfully challenged Saori Anou for the Wonder of Stardom Championship. In the 2024 edition of the Stardom Cinderella Tournament, the unit was represented by Natsuko Tora, Ruaka and Starlight Kid, with Ruaka scoring the best result by making it to the semifinals. At Stardom American Dream 2024 on April 4, Momo Watanabe and Starlight Kid teamed up with Stephanie Vaquer to defeat AZM, Saya Kamitani and Camron Branae. At Stardom All Star Grand Queendom 2024 on April 27, Rina defeated Sayaka Kurara to successfully defend the Future of Stardom Championship, Natsuko Tora wrestled Mina Shirakawa into a time-limit draw and after the bout Thekla made a return, attacked Shirakawa and joined Oedo Tai, Ruaka and Starlight Kid unsuccessfully competed in a four-way tag team bout for the Goddesses of Stardom Championship after which Kid was kicked out of the unit, and Momo Watanabe unsuccessfully challenged Maika for the World of Stardom Championship. At Stardom Flashing Champions 2024 on May 18, Rina and Fukigen Death teamed up with Azusa Inaba to defeat Mina Shirakawa, Xena and Waka Tsukiyama, and Momo Watanabe, Natsuko Tora and Thekla won a Gauntlet six-woman tag team match to determine the #1 contenders to the Artist of Stardom Championship. At Stardom The Conversion on June 21, 2024, Natsuko Tora, Thekla, Rina, Momo Watanabe and Ruaka defeated Saya Kamitani, AZM, Lady C, Hina and Miyu Amasaki in ten-woman elimination tag team competition, and per the stipulation, since Kamitani was the last wrestler eliminated, AZM, Hina, Lady C, and Amasaki all had to leave Queen's Quest.

==== Stable's dissolution, transition to H.A.T.E. (July 2024) ====
On the second night of the Stardom Sapporo World Rendezvous from July 28, 2024, Natsuko Tora defeated Maika to win the World of Stardom Championship with help from Saya Kamitani who attacked Maika, giving Tora momentum to pick up the victory. Kamitani declared Queen's Quest's dissolution, joining forces with Tora and the rest of the time's Oedo Tai members: Momo Watanabe, Thekla, Konami, Rina and Ruaka. Tora then declared the dissolution of Oedo Tai and the birth of the newly-created unit of H.A.T.E., spinning the faction off into a new identity and history.

=== New Blood series (2022–2024) ===
Various of the unit's members often compete in the New Blood series of events. At Stardom New Blood 7 on January 20, Karma and Starlight Kid defeated Club Venus (Xia Brookside and Mariah May) in the first rounds of the inaugural New Blood Tag Team Championship tournament. At New Blood Premium on March 25, 2023, Karma and Starlight Kid defeated God's Eye (Mirai and Tomoka Inaba) to become the inaugural New Blood Tag Team Champions. Following the match, Karma and Kid declared that they would adopt the team name Bloody Fate. At Stardom New Blood 9 on June 2, 2023, Karma and Starlight Kid defeated Tomoka Inaba and Azusa Inaba to successfully defend the New Blood Tag Team Championship, while Rina defeated Lady C to successfully defend the Future of Stardom Championship. At Stardom New Blood 10 on August 18, 2023, Rina defeated Waka Tsukiyama to successfully defend the Future of Stardom Championship. At New Blood 11 on September 29, Starlight Kid and Karma lost the New Blood Tag Team Championship to wing★gori (Hanan and Saya Iida). At Stardom New Blood 12 on December 25, 2023, Rina and Ruaka fell short to Mai Sakurai and Chanyota. At Stardom New Blood 13 on June 21, 2024, Rina and Azusa Inaba defeated Miyu Amasaki and Hina.

=== Independent circuit (2015–2024) ===
Multiple members of the stable are known to have worked for various promotions. Since La Rosa Negra used to wrestle in the American independent scene, she made an appearance at SHINE 36, an event promoted by Shine Wrestling and World Wrestling Network on July 22, 2016, where she teamed up with Amanda Carolina Rodriguez as Las Sicarias to unsuccessfully challenge BTY (Jayme Jameson & Marti Belle) for the Shine Tag Team Championship. La Rosa Negra's last match as part of the stable took part at Vendetta Pro Melee 2017 on May 19, an event promoted by Vendetta Pro Wrestling in partnership with the National Wrestling Alliance where she teamed up with Holidead, picking up a victory over The Ballard Brothers (Shane Ballard & Shannon Ballard) in an Intergender Tag Team Match. Jamie Hayter worked in several matches for other promotions while being part of the unit. At WWE NXT UK #42, an event promoted by WWE's NXT UK, she fell short to Viper. She also made an appearance for All Elite Wrestling on October 23, 2019, on AEW Dynamite, where she scored a defeat against Britt Baker. At Hana Kimura Memorial Show 2 on May 23, 2022, Rina defeated Sakura Hirota by taking part into a gauntlet match.

=== New Japan Pro Wrestling (2022–2024) ===
Starlight Kid was part of the series of Stardom exhibition matches to promote female talent hosted by New Japan Pro Wrestling. On the second night of Wrestle Kingdom 16 on January 5, 2022, she teamed up with Mayu Iwatani in a losing effort against Tam Nakano and Saya Kamitani. At Historic X-Over on November 20, 2022, Natsuko Tora, Saki Kashima, Ruaka and Rina competed in the Stardom Rambo, and Starlight Kid and Momo Watanabe teamed up with Suzuki-gun's El Desperado and Douki in a losing effort against Tam Nakano, Natsupoi and Taichi and Yoshinobu Kanemaru.

== Members ==
*	Founding member
I–IV	Leader

Member		Joined	Left
Kyoko Kimura	*II	January 18, 2015	January 22, 2017
Act Yasukawa	*I	January 18, 2015	December 23, 2015 (Note: Yasukawa acted as the manager of the unit until her last appearance on April 23, 2016.)
Kris Wolf	*	January 18, 2015	March 25, 2018
Heidi Lovelace	*	January 18, 2015	April 4, 2015
Hudson Envy	*	January 18, 2015	October 10, 2015
Dragonita	*	January 18, 2015	March 29, 2015
Thunder Rosa		April 12, 2015	May 19, 2017
Star Fire		May 6, 2015	September 23, 2015
Nikki Storm		June 14, 2015	July 26, 2015
La Rosa Negra		August 23, 2015	May 19, 2017
Holidead		November 3, 2015	May 19, 2017
Kaitlin Diemond		January 17, 2016	April 2, 2016
Viper		January 17, 2016	July 30, 2017
Diosa Atenea		April 17, 2016	July 9, 2016
Kagetsu	III	April 23, 2016	February 15, 2020
Leah Vaughan		May 29, 2016	August 5, 2016
Hana Kimura		September 22, 2016	September 24, 2018
Tam Nakano		September 10, 2017	January 21, 2018
Sumire Natsu		November 4, 2017	September 30, 2021
Hazuki		April 15, 2018	December 24, 2019
Martina		April 15, 2018	January 4, 2020
Nao Yamaguchi		April 15, 2018	June 5, 2018 (Note: Yamaguchi resigned in June 2018 but continued to accompany various members of the stable at ringside for five months after.)
Brandi Rhodes		April 30, 2018	May 6, 2018
Andras Miyagi		February 17, 2019	November 23, 2019
Jamie Hayter		January 3, 2019	November 15, 2020 (Note: This was the last time Hayter performed in a Stardom ring.)
Saki Kashima		January 3, 2020	June 25, 2023
Bea Priestley		January 19, 2020	April 4, 2021
Starlight Kid		June 12, 2021	April 27, 2024
Natsuko Tora	IV	April 14, 2019	July 28, 2024
Rina		October 29, 2020	July 28, 2024
Ruaka		February 20, 2021	July 28, 2024
Fukigen Death		April 4, 2021	July 28, 2024
Momo Watanabe		December 18, 2021	July 28, 2024
Thekla		April 27, 2024	July 28, 2024
Konami		October 3, 2020–December 29, 2021; July 23, 2024–July 28, 2024 (Note: During their Goddess of Stardom Championship title defense against Thekla and Momo Watanabe on July 23, 2024, Konami attacked God's Eye stablemate Syuri and turned on their cause. She declared that in fact she had never left Oedo Tai back in 2021 when se became a part-timer, however, her 2022–2024 period officially sanctioned Konami as a God's Eye unit member alongside her accomplishments.)	
Saya Kamitani		July 28, 2024	

== Sub-groups ==
Affiliate	Members	Tenure	Type
Twisted Sisters	Holidead; Thunder Rosa	2015–2017	Tag team
Black Widows	Bea Priestley; Konami	2020–2021 (Note: Priestley & Konami used the name of Black Widows only in the 2020 Goddesses of Stardom Tag League.)	Tag Team
Devil Duo	Natsuko Tora; Saki Kashima	2020	Tag team
Water & Oil	Rina; Hanan	2021 (Note: This team only activated in the 2021 edition of the Goddesses of Stardom Tag League. Hanan was not part of the stable)	Tag team
We Love Tokyo Sports! 東スポ大好き!	Saki Kashima; Fukigen Death	2021–2023	Tag team
Black Desire	Starlight Kid; Momo Watanabe	2021–2024	Tag team
YoungOED	Starlight Kid; Ruaka; Rina	2021–2024	Trio
BMI2000	Natsuko Tora; Ruaka	2022–2024	Tag team
XL	Momo Watanabe; Natsuko Tora	2023–2024	Tag team
Gold Ship	Natsuko Tora; Momo Watanabe; Saki Kashima	2023	Trio/tag team
Bloody Fate	Karma; Starlight Kid	2023–2024	Tag team
Unique Glare	Starlight Kid; Karma; Ruaka	2023–2024	Trio/tag team

=== Timeline ===
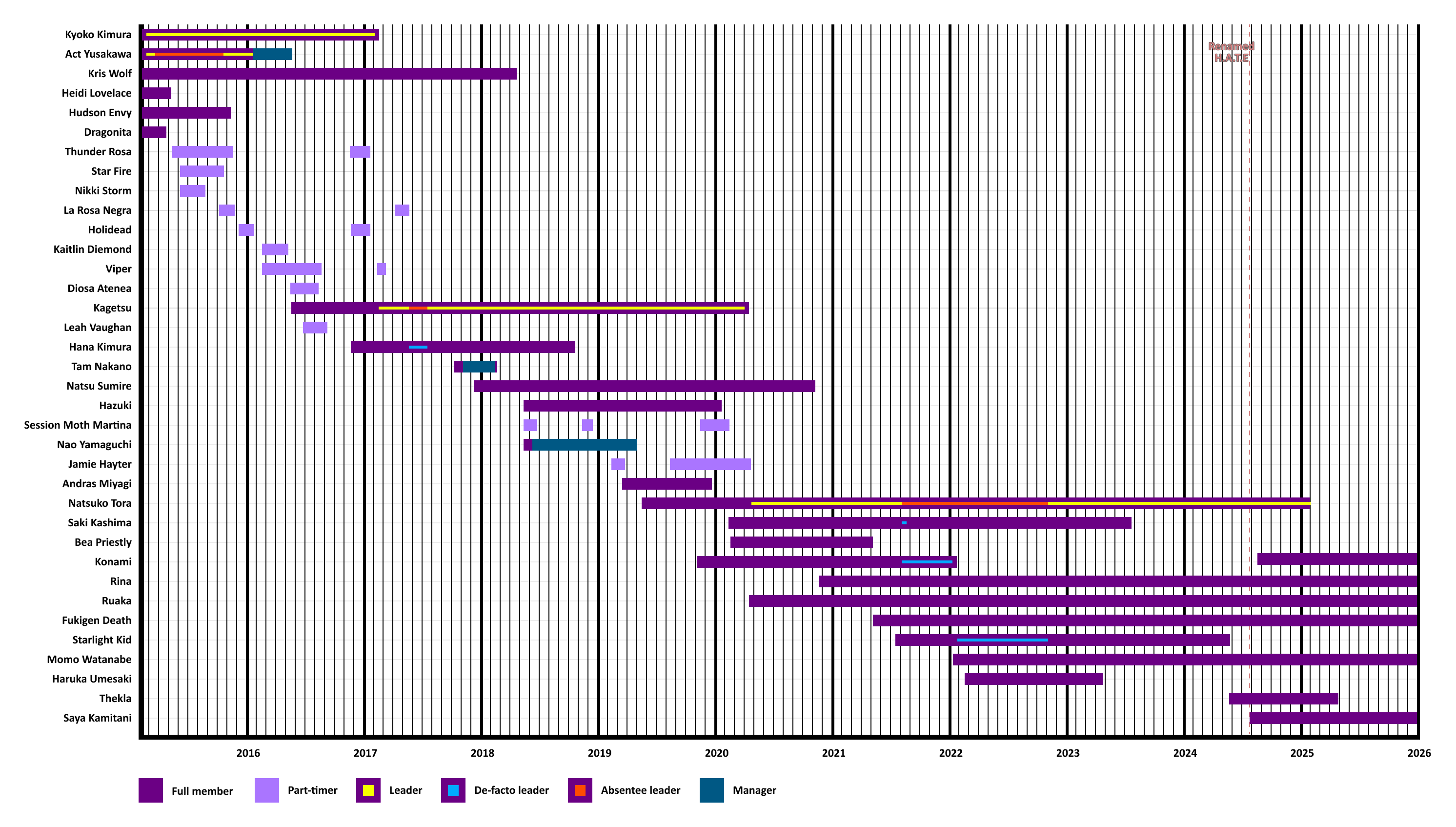

== Championships and Accomplishments ==
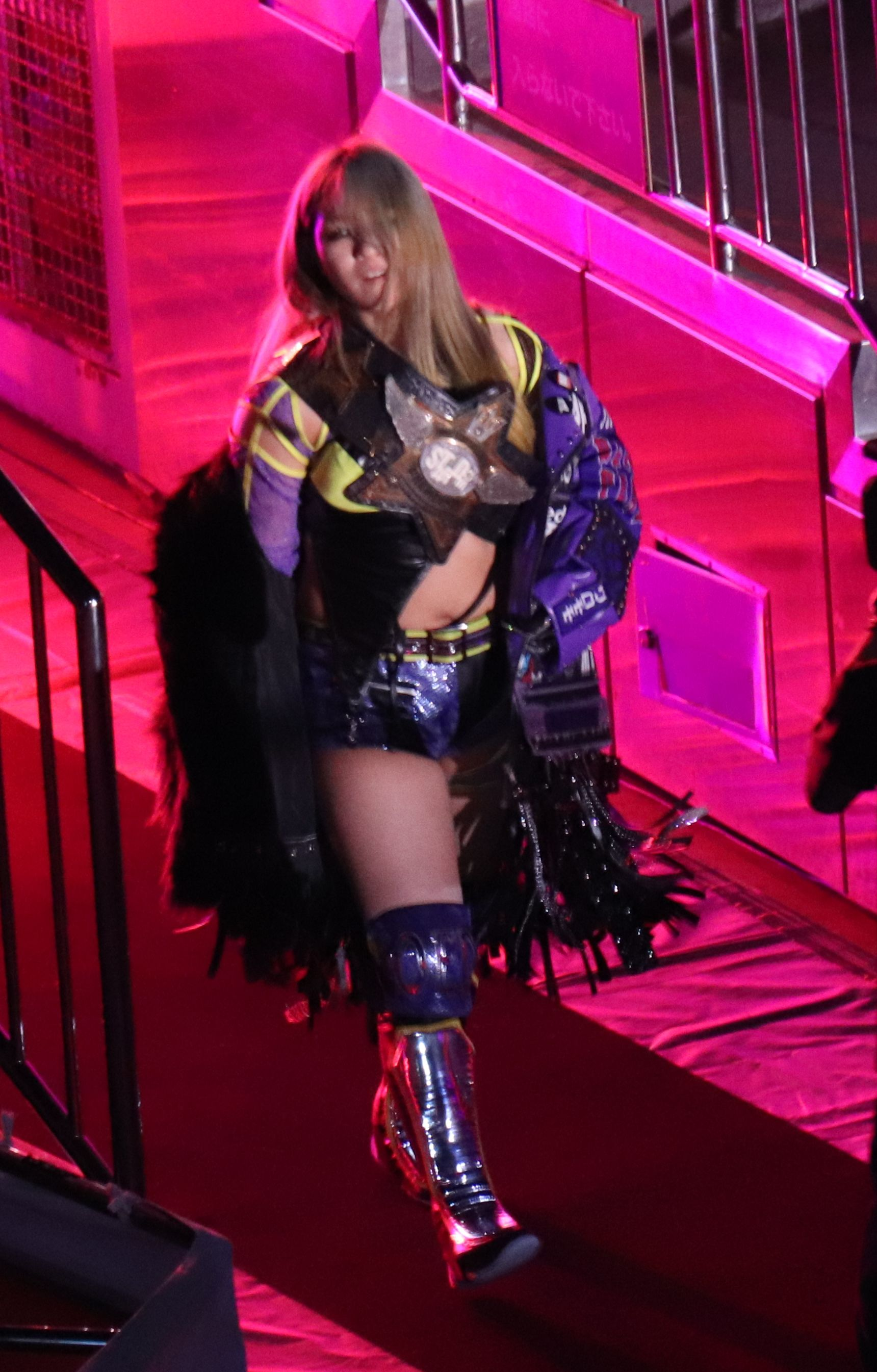
Momo Watanabe as half of the Goddesses of Stardom Champions at Stardom World Climax 2022...

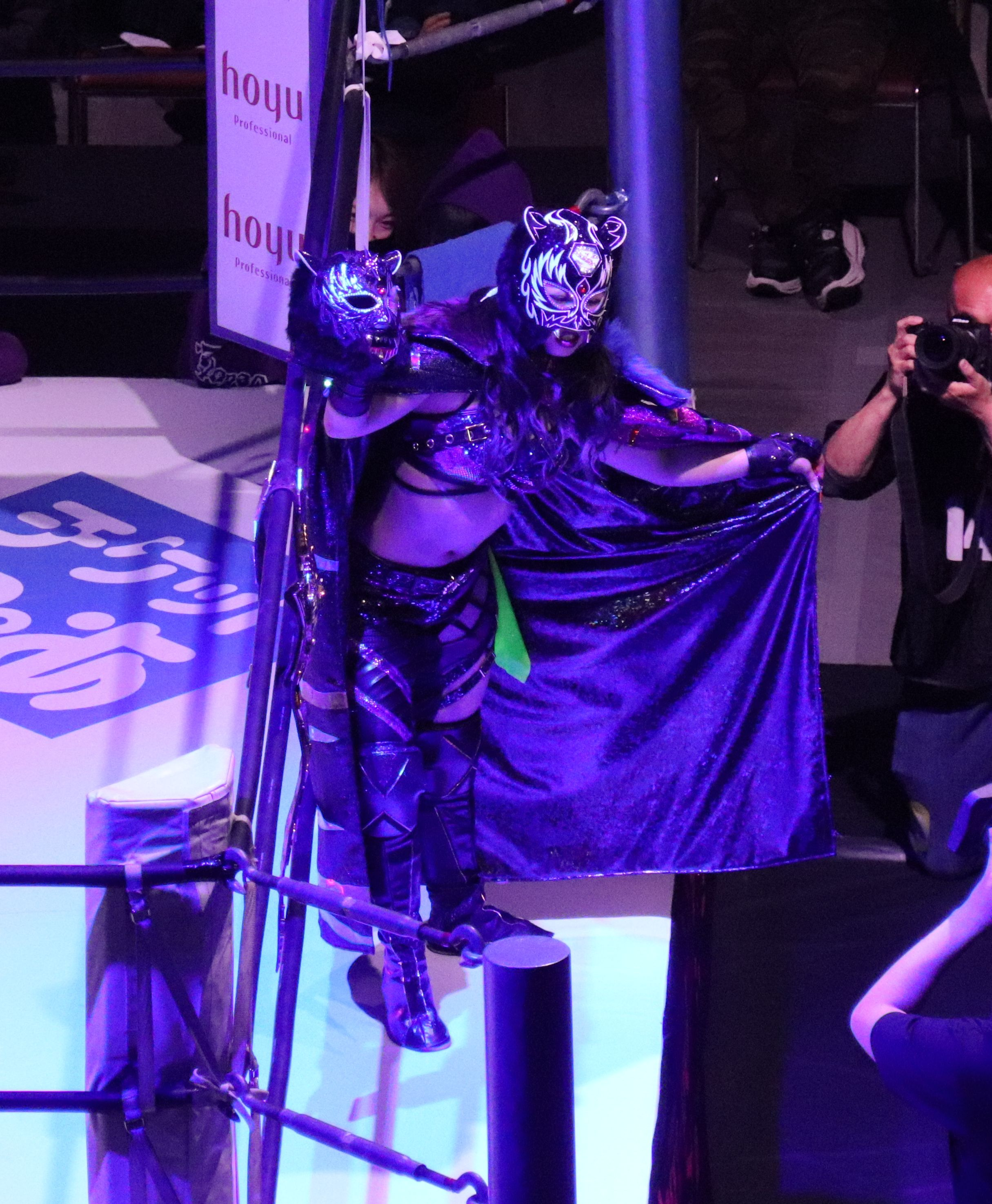
... and Starlight Kid, the other half at the same event.

- Alpha Omega Wrestling
  - AOW Women's Championship (1 time) – Viper
- DDT Pro-Wrestling
  - Ironman Heavymetalweight Championship (1 time) – Umesaki
- JWP Joshi Puroresu
  - JWP Junior Championship (1 time) – Hana Kimura
  - JWP Openweight Championship (1 time) – Kyoko Kimura
  - JWP Tag Team Championship (1 time) – Kyoko Kimura with Hanako Nakamori (Note: Nakamori was not part of the stable while teaming up with Kimura.)
- Oz Academy
  - Oz Academy Openweight Championship (1 time) – Fukigen Death
  - Oz Academy Pioneer Championship (2 times) – Fukigen Death
  - Oz Academy Tag Team Championship (1 time) – Fukigen Death with Yuu
- Pure-J
  - Princess of Pro Wrestling Championship (1 time) – Hana Kimura
  - Daily Sports Women's Tag Team Championship (1 time) – Kyoko Kimura with Hanako Nakamori
- Pro Wrestling Illustrated
  - Ranked Bea Priestley No. 19 of the top 100 female singles wrestlers in the PWI Women's 100 in 2019
  - Ranked Jamie Hayter No. 47 of the top 100 female singles wrestlers in the PWI Women's 100 in 2020
  - Ranked Kagetsu No. 18 of the top 100 female singles wrestlers in the PWI Women's 100 in 2018
  - Ranked La Rosa Negra No. 48 of the top 50 female singles wrestlers in the PWI Women's 50 in 2015
  - Ranked Momo Watanabe No. 39 of the top 150 female singles wrestlers in the PWI Women's 150 in 2022
  - Ranked Starlight Kid No. 9 of the top 150 female singles wrestlers in the PWI Women's 150 in 2022
  - Ranked Thunder Rosa No. 43 of the top 50 female singles wrestlers in the PWI Women's 50 in 2016
- Pro-Wrestling: EVE
  - Pro-Wrestling: EVE International Championship (1 time) – Hayter
- Revolution Pro Wrestling
  - RevPro British Women's Championship (1 time) – Jamie Hayter
- Spark Joshi Puroresu of America
  - Spark Joshi World Championship (1 time) – Starlight Kid
- Vendetta Pro Wrestling
  - NWA Western States Tag Team Championship (1 time) – Holidead and Thunder Rosa
- Women Wrestling Stars
  - WWS Championship (1 time) – Diosa Atenea
- World Wonder Ring Stardom
  - Artist of Stardom Championship (4 times) – Andras Miyagi, Kagetsu and Sumire Natsu (1), Hana Kimura, Kagetsu and Kyoko Kimura (1), Bea Priestley, Natsuko Tora and Saki Kashima (1), Saki Kashima, Momo Watanabe and Starlight Kid (1)
  - Future of Stardom Championship (2 times) – Ruaka (1) and Rina (1)
  - Goddesses of Stardom Championship (6 times) – Bea Priestley and Jamie Hayter (1), Bea Priestley and Konami (1), Kagetsu and Hana Kimura (1), Kagetsu and Kyoko Kimura (1), Momo Watanabe and Starlight Kid (1), Momo Watanabe and Thekla (1)
  - High Speed Championship (6 times) – HZK (1), Kris Wolf (1), La Rosa Negra (1), Star Fire (1), Starlight Kid (1) and Saki Kashima (1)
  - New Blood Tag Team Championship (2 times) – Karma and Starlight Kid (1), Rina and Azusa Inaba (Note: Inaba was an associate of the unit during her reign with Rina.) (1)
  - SWA World Championship (2 times) – Bea Priestley (1) and Jamie Hayter (1)
  - Wonder of Stardom Championship (2 times) – Act Yasukawa
  - World of Stardom Championship (2 times) – Kagetsu (1), Natsuko Tora (1)
  - Inaugural New Blood Tag Team Championship Tournament (2023) – Starlight Kid and Karma
  - 5★Star GP Award (3 times)
    - 5★Star GP Best Match Award
      - (2017) – Hazuki and Kagetsu vs. Io Shirai and Mayu Iwatani
    - 5★Star GP Technical Skill Award (2021) – Starlight Kid
    - 5★Star GP Outstanding Performance Award (2022) – Saki Kashima
  - Stardom Year-End Award (8 times)
    - Best Tag Team Award – Hana Kimura and Kagetsu (2017)
    - Best Technique Award – Konami (2020)
    - Best Unit Award (2019, 2021)
    - Fighting Spirit Award – Act Wasukawa (2015); Starlight Kid (2022)
    - Special Merit Award – Bea Priestley (2020)
    - Shining Award – Starlight Kid (2021)
- World Woman Pro-Wrestling Diana
  - World Woman Pro-Wrestling Diana World Championship (1 time) – Umesaki
  - World Woman Pro-Wrestling Diana Queen Elizabeth Championship (1 time) – Fukigen Death
  - World Woman Pro-Wrestling Diana Tag Team Championship (2 times) – Umesaki (1) with Miyuki Takase (Note: Takase was not part of the stable while holding the titles with Umesaki.) and Fukigen Death (1) with Kaho Kobayashi (Note: Kobayashi was not part of the stable while holsing the titles with Yoneyama.)

== Luchas de Apuestas record ==
Winner (wager)	Loser (wager)	Location	Event	Date	Notes
Queen's Quest (AZM, Konami and Momo Watanabe) (mask) (Note: Even if partially going under masks, if AZM, Watanabe & Konami lost the match they must have given them up completely.)	Oedo Tai (HZK, Kagetsu & Natsu Sumire) (dance)	Yokohama, Japan	Stardom Glory Stars 2019 (Night 1)	April 13, 2019	
Oedo Tai (Starlight Kid, Konami, Ruaka and Saki Kashima) (mask) (Note: This was an eight-woman elimination tag team match in which Watanabe and Kid were their respective team's captains and if one of them lost they would be forced to join the enemy unit. Had Kid lost, she would have had to unmask.)	Queen's Quest (Momo Watanabe, Utami Hayashishita, Saya Kamitani & AZM) (leader)	Osaka, Japan	Osaka Super Wars	December 18, 2021	
