= Stardom All Star Dream Cinderella =

2021 World Wonder Ring Stardom event

Stardom 10th Anniversary ~Hinamatsuri All-Star Dream Cinderella~
- The official poster featuring a big part of the participants
- Promotion: World Wonder Ring Stardom
- Date: March 3, 2021
- City: Tokyo, Japan
- Venue: Nippon Budokan
- Attendance: 3,318

Event chronology
← Previous; 10th Anniversary Show	Next → Yokohama Dream Cinderella 2021

Stardom All Star Dream Cinderella (スターダムオールスタードリームシンデレラ, Sutādamu ōru sutā dorīmu shinderera), also known as Stardom 10th Anniversary ~Hinamatsuri All-Star Dream Cinderella~, was a professional wrestling event promoted by World Wonder Ring Stardom. It was the second from the promotion's 10th Anniversary celebration line of events. It took place on March 3, 2021 in Tokyo, Japan, at the Nippon Budokan with a limited attendance due in part to the ongoing COVID-19 pandemic at the time.

== Storylines ==
The show featured eight professional wrestling matches that resulted from scripted storylines, where wrestlers portrayed villains, heroes, or less distinguishable characters in the scripted events that built tension and culminated in a wrestling match or series of matches. Stardom held a press conference on February 23, 2021 at the Ichigaya Grand Hill hotel where they announced all the final matches of the official card of the pay-per-view.

On July 26, 2020, Giulia won her first Wonder of Stardom Championship by defeating Tam Nakano in a singles match at Cinderella Summer in Tokyo after Arisa Hoshiki vacated the title due to retirement. On February 7, 2021, the Cosmic Angels achieved a degree of revenge in defeating Donnal Del Mondo in a tag team match, with Tam Nakano pinning the stable’s latest recruit Natsupoi. After the match, Nakano issued a challenge to Giulia, which was quickly countered with the condition of a Hair vs Hair match with Giulia having calculated this to be off-putting to Nakano, given her background as an Idol in Japan. Surprisingly, Nakano accepted, with the match set for the March 3rd show at the Budokan, provided Giulia still has the Wonder of Stardom title in her possession.

== Event ==
The event featured two matches on which wrestlers from the Japanese independent scene took on Stardom competitors. In the first one, veteran Nanae Takahashi defeated Momo Watanabe and in the second one Stars leader Mayu Iwatani defeated long time enemy Yoshiko. The main event was a Hair vs Hair match 髪と髪のマッチ (Kami to kami no matchi) in which Giulia defended the Wonder of Stardom Championship against Tam Nakano. The main stipulation of the match was to shave the loser's head bald. Nakano refused to trim Giulia's hair as a specially was hired barber to do the job instead. Giulia got all of her hair shaved backstage. After the match, Nakano became a double champion, also being a part of the Artist of Stardom Champions alongside Unagi Sayaka and Mina Shirakawa.

== Results ==
No.	Results	Stipulations	Times
1^{P}	Natsupoi defeated AZM (c)	Singles match for the High Speed Championship	7:41
2^{P}	Donna Del Mondo (Maika and Himeka) (c) defeated Oedo Tai (Natsuko Tora and Saki Kashima)	Tag team match for the Goddesses of Stardom Championship	7:15
3	Unagi Sayaka won by last eliminating Yuzuki Aikawa	24-women All-Star Rumble (Note: The Rumble participants were Bea Priestley, Mina Shirakawa, Unagi Sayaka, Starlight Kid, Saya Iida, Gokigen Death, Lady C, Chigusa Nagayo, Kyoko Inoue, Mima Shimoda, Hiroyo Matsumoto, Emi Sakura, Rin Kadokura, Ruaka, Mei Hoshizuki, Yuzuki Aikawa, Yoko Bito, Miho Wakizawa, Hiromi Mimura, Yuna Manase, Haruka Kato, Koguma, Momoe Nakanishi and Kikutaro.)	35:01
4	Nanae Takahashi defeated Momo Watanabe	Singles match	10:21
5	Syuri (c) defeated Konami by submission	Singles match for the SWA World Championship	8:19
6	Mayu Iwatani defeated Yoshiko	Singles match	15:09
7	Utami Hayashishita (c) defeated Saya Kamitani	Singles match for the World of Stardom Championship	15:46
8	Tam Nakano defeated Giulia (c)	Hair vs. Hair match for the Wonder of Stardom Championship	18:57
(c) / – the champion(s) heading into the match; P / – the match was broadcast on the pre-show
