= Stardom Yokohama Dream Cinderella 2021 =

2021 World Wonder Ring Stardom event

- Promotional poster featuring animated representations of various Stardom wrestlers
- Promotion: World Wonder Ring Stardom
- Date: April 4, 2021
- City: Yokohama, Japan
- Venue: Yokohama Budokan
- Attendance: 1,029

Event chronology
← Previous; All Star Dream Cinderella	Next → Cinderella Tournament 2021

Stardom Yokohama Dream Cinderella (スターダム横浜ドリームシンデレラ, Sutādamu Yokohama dorīmushinderera) was a professional wrestling event promoted by World Wonder Ring Stardom. It took place on April 4, 2021 in Yokohama, Japan, at the Yokohama Budokan with a limited attendance due in part to the ongoing COVID-19 pandemic at the time. The preshow was broadcast live on Stardom's YouTube channel.

== Storylines ==
The show featured eight professional wrestling matches that resulted from scripted storylines, where wrestlers portrayed villains, heroes, or less distinguishable characters in the scripted events that built tension and culminated in a wrestling match or series of matches.

=== Background ===
One of the main matches of the night was the battle between the Donna Del Mondo stablemates Maika, Himeka, Giulia and Syuri who clashed for the Goddesses of Stardom Championship. The event also featured Bea Priestley's last match for World Wonder Ring Stardom, after she unsuccessfully challenged Queen Quests's Utami Hayashishita for the World of Stardom Championship.

== Results ==
No.	Results	Stipulations	Times
1^{P}	Hina defeated AZM and Lady C	Three-way match	7:06
2	Momo Watanabe defeated Mina Shirakawa	Singles match	11:54
3	Saya Kamitani defeated Unagi Sayaka	Singles match	13:42
4	Oedo Tai (Natsuko Tora, Ruaka, Konami, Saki Kashima and Rina) defeated Stars (Mayu Iwatani, Saya Iida, Starlight Kid, Hanan and Gokigen Death)	Ten-woman elimination tag team match The last one eliminated was forced to join the enemy unit. Since Gokigen Death was eliminated last, she joined Oedo Tai.	25:30
5	Tam Nakano (c) defeated Natsupoi	Singles match for the Wonder of Stardom Championship	18:50
6	Utami Hayashishita (c) defeated Bea Priestley	Singles match for the World of Stardom Championship	20:53
7	Donna Del Mondo (Giulia and Syuri) defeated Donna Del Mondo (Maika and Himeka) (c)	Tag team match for the Goddesses of Stardom Championship	28:57
(c) / – the champion(s) heading into the match; P / – the match was broadcast on the pre-show
