= SWA World Championship =

Professional wrestling women's championship

- The SWA World Championship belt

Details
- Promotion: World Wonder Ring Stardom
- Date established: May 21, 2016
- Date retired: November 3, 2022

Other name
- SWA Undisputed World Women's Championship
Statistics
- First champion: Io Shirai
- Final champion: Mayu Iwatani
- Longest reign: Toni Storm (612 days)
- Shortest reign: Bea Priestley (43 days)
- Oldest champion: Syuri (31 years, 9 months and 7 days)
- Youngest champion: Toni Storm (20 years, 9 months and 5 days)
- Heaviest champion: Viper (94 kg (207 lb))
- Lightest champion: Io Shirai (54 kg (119 lb))

The SWA World Championship (SWA世界王座, SWA Sekai Ōza) was a women's professional wrestling championship promoted by the Japanese World Wonder Ring Stardom promotion. Though the Japanese name of the title translated to "SWA World Championship", the title was also referred internationally to as the "SWA Undisputed World Women's Championship".

== Title history ==
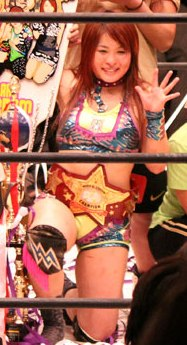
Inaugural champion Io Shirai.

The title was created on May 21, 2016, during Stardom's three-day European tour, as the flagship title for a newly established international alliance called the Stardom World Association (SWA) (スターダム・ワールド・アソシエーション, Sutādamu Wārudo Asoshiēshon). Promotions in the alliance include Stardom, British Empire Wrestling (BEW), the French Association Biterroise de Catch (ABC), the Mexican Women Wrestling Stars (WWS) and the Spanish Revolution Championship Wrestling (RCW). Like most professional wrestling championships, the title is won as a result of a scripted match. The rules of the championship state that only wrestlers from countries other than the reigning champion can challenge it. For example, as long as the title had a Japanese champion, no other Japanese wrestler could challenge for it. On the same date, Io Shirai became the inaugural champion after defeating Toni Storm in the tournament finals.

On September 17, 2020, the championship was vacated after the previous titleholder, Jamie Hayter, was unable to travel to Stardom due to COVID-19 restrictions. On September 17, Bea Priestley won the title by defeating Momo Watanabe. On January 8, 2022, Syuri vacated the title due to being a triple champion and to focus on the World of Stardom Championship and the Goddesses of Stardom Championship. Thekla won the vacant title after defeating Mina Shirakawa. On November 3, Mayu Iwatani relinquished the title in order to pursue after the newly established IWGP Women's Championship. The title was subsequently abandoned and never mentioned again.

== Reigns ==
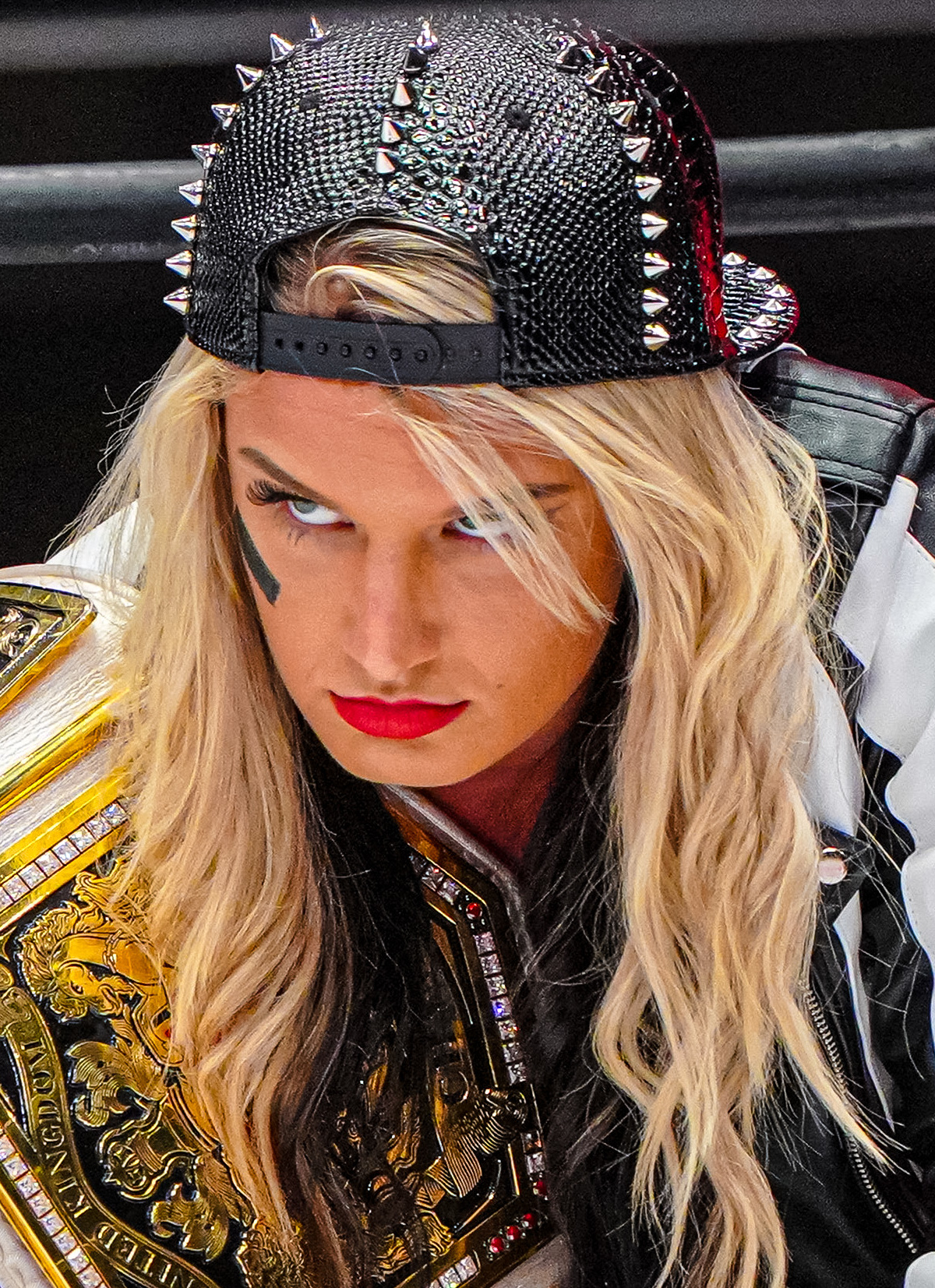
Toni Storm was the longest reigning champion at 612 days.

Over the title's six-year history, there were nine reigns between nine wrestlers and three vacancies. Io Shirai was the inaugural champion. Toni Storm had the longest reign at 612 days while also having the most defenses, with 15 times. Bea Priestley had the shortest at 43 days. Syuri was the oldest champion at 31 years old, while Storm was the youngest at 20 years old. Mayu Iwatani was the final champion.

Key
No.	Overall reign number
Reign	Reign number for the specific champion
Days	Number of days held
Defenses	Number of successful defenses
+	Current reign is changing daily

No.	Champion	Championship change			Reign statistics			Notes	Ref.
No.	Champion	Date	Event	Location	Reign	Days	Defenses	Notes	Ref.
World Wonder Ring Stardom (ST★RDOM)
1	Io Shirai	May 21, 2016	RCW Presents Stardom Europe	Barcelona, Spain	1	64	2	Defeated Toni Storm in the finals of a nine-woman tournament to become the inaugural champion.	
2	Toni Storm	July 24, 2016	Stardom×Stardom 2016: Osaka Manatsu no Saiten	Osaka, Japan	1	612	15		
3	Viper	March 28, 2018	Stardom Dream Slam in Tokyo	Tokyo, Japan	1	292	2	This was a title vs. title match, in which Viper also defended the ICW Women's Championship.	
4	Utami Hayashishita	January 14, 2019	Stardom 8th Anniversary	Tokyo, Japan	1	377	3	Viper also defended her EVE International Championship in this match.	
5	Jamie Hayter	January 26, 2020	Stardom 9th Anniversary in Osaka	Osaka, Japan	1	235	0		
—	Vacated	September 17, 2020	—	—	—	—	—	The championship was vacated since Jamie Hayter was unable to travel to Japan due to COVID-19 restrictions.	
6	Bea Priestley	October 3, 2020	Yokohama Cinderella	Yokohama, Kanagawa, Japan	1	43	0	Defeated Momo Watanabe to win the vacant championship.	
7	Syuri	November 15, 2020	Sendai Cinderella	Sendai, Miyagi, Japan	1	419	9		
—	Vacated	January 8, 2022	Stardom in Korakuen Hall	Tokyo, Japan	—	—	—	Syuri voluntarily relinquished the title due to being a triple champion and to focus on the World of Stardom Championship and the Goddesses of Stardom Championship.	
8	Thekla	January 29, 2022	Nagoya Supreme Fight	Nagoya, Japan	1	96	2	Defeated Mina Shirakawa to win the vacant championship.	
9	Mayu Iwatani	May 5, 2022	Golden Week Fight Tour	Fukuoka, Japan	1	182	3		
—	Vacated	November 3, 2022	Hiroshima Goddess Festival	Hiroshima, Japan	—	—	—	Mayu Iwatani voluntarily relinquished the title to focus on the IWGP Women's Championship.	
—	Deactivated	November 3, 2022	—	—	—	—	—	The championship was abandoned.	
