= Stardom New Blood Premium =

2023 World Wonder Ring Stardom event

New Blood Premium
- Promotional poster of the event
- Promotion: World Wonder Ring Stardom
- Date: March 25, 2023
- City: Yokohama, Japan
- Venue: Yokohama Budokan
- Attendance: 734

Event chronology
← Previous; Stardom in Showcase vol.4	Next → Stardom Cinderella Tournament 2023

New Blood chronology
← Previous; New Blood 7	Next → New Blood 8

Stardom New Blood Premium (スターダム ニューブラッド プレミアム, Sutādamu nyūburaddo puremiamu) was a professional wrestling event promoted by World Wonder Ring Stardom. The event took place on March 25, 2023, in Yokohama, Japan at the Yokohama Budokan. The event saw the finals of the New Blood Tag Team Championship tournament to crown the inaugural New Blood Tag Team Champions.

== Production ==
=== Background ===
The "New Blood" is a series of events that mainly focus on matches where rookie wrestlers, usually with three or fewer years of in-ring experience, evolve. Besides wrestlers from Stardom, various superstars from multiple promotions of the Japanese independent scene are invited to compete in bouts that are usually going under the stipulation of singles or tag team matches.

The show featured nine professional wrestling matches that result from scripted storylines, where wrestlers portray villains, heroes, or less distinguishable characters in the scripted events that build tension and culminates in a wrestling match or series of matches. During the Stardom New Blood 6 event, the New Blood Tag Team Championship were introduced alongside a tournament to crown the inaugural champions which was set to begin at New Blood 7 on January 20, and concluding at New Blood Premium in Yokohama Budokan on March 25.

On the twelfth night of the Triangle Derby I from February 17, 2023, Stardom announced Hanako Ueda, Sakura Ishiguro and Komomo Minami as their newest trainees and they were all set to make their debuts at New Blood Premium on March 25, 2023. At the event's press conference from March 7, their respective matches were announced alongside their new ring names. Ishiguro and Ueda would go under the names of Sakura Aya and Hanako, while Minami kept her original name. Minami was scheduled to face Hazuki but suffered a legitimate injury while training and was pulled out of the card.

=== Event ===
The first two matches of the preshow were broadcast on Stardom's YouTube channel. In the first one, Hanan and Hina picked up a victory over Stars (Momo Kohgo and Saya Iida) and YoungOED (Rina and Ruaka), and in the second one, World of Stardom Champion Giulia defeated a debuting Sakura Aya. The first main card bout saw Maika and Himeka picking up a victory over a debuting Hanako and Lady C. Next up, Mariah May dressed up a "Sexy Dynamite Princess" defeated Super Strong Stardom Machine in singles competition. The fifth match saw one of the semifinals of the inaugural New Blood Tag Team Championship tournament in which Mirai and Tomoka Inaba defeated stablemates Ami Sourei and Nanami to advance to the finals. In the sixth match, Starlight Kid and Karma defeated Mai Sakurai and Chanyota to secure the other spot in the tournament finals. In the eighth confrontation, Syuri defeated Miyu Amasaki in one of the latter's "triumph series" of matches. In the semi main event, Starlight Kid and Karma defeated Mirai and Tomoka Inaba to become the first-ever New Blood Tag Team Champions. They received a challenge from Lady C and Hanako right after the bout concluded.

In the main event, Tam Nakano and Waka Tsukiyama defeated one half of the Goddesses of Stardom Champions Nanae Takahashi and Kairi. Tsukiyama succeeded in scoring a victory in almost two years.

== Matches ==
No.	Results	Stipulations	Times
1^{P}	Hanan and Hina defeated Stars (Momo Kohgo and Saya Iida) and YoungOED (Rina and Ruaka)	Three-way tag team match	5:44
2^{P}	Giulia defeated Aya Sakura	Singles match	8:51
3	MaiHime (Maika and Himeka) defeated Hanako and Lady C	Tag team match	10:46
4	Sexy Dynamite Princess (with Mina Shirakawa) defeated Super Strong Stardom Big Machine (with Stardom Strong Machine)	Singles match	5:18
5	God's Eye (Mirai and Tomoka Inaba) defeated God's Eye (Ami Sourei and Nanami) by submission	Tournament semifinal for the inaugural New Blood Tag Team Championship	10:19
6	Oedo Tai (Starlight Kid and Karma) defeated Mai Sakurai and Chanyota	Tournament semifinal for the inaugural New Blood Tag Team Championship	7:05
7	Syuri defeated Miyu Amasaki by referee stoppage	Singles match	13:04
8	Bloody Fate (Starlight Kid and Karma) defeated God's Eye (Mirai and Tomoka Inaba)	Tournament final for the inaugural New Blood Tag Team Championship	13:07
9	Cosmic Angels (Tam Nakano and Waka Tsukiyama) defeated Nanae Takahashi and Kairi	Tag team match Had Tsukiyama lost, she would have left Stardom. (Note: Nakano previously gave an ultimatum to Tsukiyama to get a win otherwise she would get kicked out of Cosmic Angels. She offered to help Tsukiyama finally get the victory against Takahashi and a mystery partner which was later revealed to be Kairi.)	21:58
P / – the match was broadcast on the pre-show

=== New Blood Tag Team Championship Inaugural Tournament ===
Quarterfinals; New Blood 7 (January 20)
Club Venus (Xia Brookside and Mariah May)	Pin
Bloody Fate (Starlight Kid and Karma)	12:26
Queen's Quest (Hina and Lady C (Note: Miyu Amasaki was initially scheduled to team with Hina but was replaced by Lady C on the day of the event.))	9:05
Mai Sakurai and Chanyota	Pin
God's Eye (Ami Sourei and Nanami)	Pin
Momo Kohgo and Momoka Hanazono	11:53
God's Eye (Mirai and Tomoka Inaba)	Pin
wing★gori (Saya Iida and Hanan)	12:02

Semifinals; New Blood Premium (March 25)
Bloody Fate (Starlight Kid and Karma)	Pin
Mai Sakurai and Chanyota	7:05
God's Eye (Ami Sourei and Nanami)	10:19
God's Eye (Mirai and Tomoka Inaba)	Sub

Finals; New Blood Premium (March 25)
Bloody Fate (Starlight Kid and Karma)	Pin
God's Eye (Mirai and Tomoka Inaba)	13:07
