= Stardom Fukuoka Goddess Legend =

2023 World Wonder Ring Stardom event

- One of the promotional posters of the event featuring Maika
- Promotion: World Wonder Ring Stardom
- Date: May 4, 2023
- City: Fukuoka, Japan
- Venue: Fukuoka Kokusai Center
- Attendance: 1,338

Event chronology
← Previous; All Star Grand Queendom	Next → New Blood 8

Stardom Fukuoka Goddess Legend (スターダム福岡 女神伝説, Sutādamu Fukuoka megami densetsu) was a professional wrestling event promoted by World Wonder Ring Stardom. The event took place on May 4, 2023, in Fukuoka at the Fukuoka Kokusai Center.

Eight matches were contested at the event, including one on the pre-show, and three of Stardom's nine championships were on the line. The main event saw Mina Shirakawa defeat Natsupoi to retain the Wonder of Stardom Championship. Other top matches included The New Eras (Ami Sourei and Mirai) successfully defending the Goddesses of Stardom Championship against Fukuoka Double Crazy (Hazuki and Koguma), and AZM defeated Mei Seira to retain the High Speed Championship.

== Production ==
=== Background ===
The show featured eight professional wrestling matches that result from scripted storylines, where wrestlers portray villains, heroes, or less distinguishable characters in the scripted events that build tension and culminate in a wrestling match or series of matches.

=== Event ===
The preshow match in which Suzu Suzuki won the Fukuoka Rumble match by last eliminating Mai Sakurai was broadcast live on Stardom's YouTube channel. In the first bout of the main card, IWGP Women's Champion Mayu Iwatani and Hanan picked up a victory over Mariah May and Jessie. Next up, World of Stardom Champion Tam Nakano and one third of the Artist of Stardom Champions Saori Anou defeated one half of the New Blood Tag Team Champions Starlight Kid and Ruaka. Next, Natsuko Tora and Momo Watanabe picked up a victory over Syuri and Konami. In the fifth match, Giulia and Maika defeated Utami Hayashishita and Saya Kamitani. Next up, AZM defended the High Speed Championship for the twelfth consecutive time in that respective reign against Mei Seira. She received a challenge from Saki Kashima afterwards. In the semi main event, Ami Sourei and Mirai defeated Hazuki and Koguma to secure their first title defense in that respective reign. They received a challenge from Natsuko Tora and Momo Watanabe afterwards.

In the main event, Mina Shirakawa defeated Natsupoi to secure the first defense of the Wonder of Stardom Championship in that respective reign. Shirakawa then called out world champion Tam Nakano as they set a champion versus champion winner takes all match for Flashing Champions on May 27, 2023. Jushin Liger joined the commentary table for the main event.

== Results ==
No.	Results	Stipulations	Times
1^{P}	Suzu Suzuki won by last eliminating Mai Sakurai	Fukuoka Rumble match (Note: The other participants were Saya Iida, Lady C, Thekla, Saki Kashima, Waka Tsukiyama, Yuna Mizumori, Super Strong Stardom Machine, Super Strong Stardom Giant Machine, Super Strong Stardom Big Machine, Sakura Aya, Hanako and Tenjin Mask.)	19:20
2	Stars (Mayu Iwatani and Hanan) defeated Club Venus (Mariah May and Jessie)	Tag team match	8:55
3	Cosmic Angels (Tam Nakano and Saori Anou) defeated YoungOED (Starlight Kid and Ruaka)	Tag team match	11:04
4	Oedo Tai (Natsuko Tora and Momo Watanabe) defeated God's Eye (Syuri and Konami)	Tag team match	7:02
5	Donna Del Mondo (Giulia and Maika) defeated AphrOditE (Utami Hayashishita and Saya Kamitani)	Tag team match	16:22
6	AZM (c) defeated Mei Seira	Singles match for the High Speed Championship	10:46
7	The New Eras (Ami Sourei and Mirai) (c) defeated Fukuoka Double Crazy (Hazuki and Koguma)	Tag team match for the Goddesses of Stardom Championship	17:36
8	Mina Shirakawa (c) defeated Natsupoi	Singles match for the Wonder of Stardom Championship	20:27
(c) / – the champion(s) heading into the match; P / – the match was broadcast on the pre-show
