= Stardom Cinderella Tournament 2023 =

2023 World Wonder Ring Stardom event

- Promotional poster of the event
- Promotion: World Wonder Ring Stardom
- Date: March 26–April 15, 2023
- City: Yokohama, Japan (March 26); Utsunomiya, Japan (April 1); Tokyo, Japan (April 2 & 15)
- Venue: Yokohama Budokan (March 26); Light Cube Utsunomiya (April 1); Korakuen Hall (April 2); Yoyogi National Gymnasium (April 15)
- Attendance: Night 1 (1,263); Night 2 (508); Night 3 (1,295); Night 4 (1,049)

Event chronology
← Previous; New Blood Premium	Next → All Star Grand Queendom

Cinderella Tournament chronology
← Previous; 2022	Next → 2024

The 2023 Stardom Cinderella Tournament (スターダムシンデレラトーナメント2023, Sutādamushindereratōnamento 2023) was the ninth annual professional wrestling single-elimination tournament under the Cinderella Tournament branch of events promoted by World Wonder Ring Stardom. The event took place between March 26 and April 15, 2023.

== Storylines ==
The show featured professional wrestling matches with scripted storylines, where wrestlers portray villains, heroes, or less distinguishable characters in the scripted events that built tension and culminate in a wrestling match or series of matches. The matches can be won by pinfall, submission or elimination over the top rope. A time-limit draw or a double elimination means a loss for each competitor.

== Event ==
=== Night 1 (March 26) ===
The first day of the event which took place on March 26, 2023, portraited the first-round tournament matches. The first two bouts were broadcast on Stardom's YouTube channel. In the first one, Waka Tsukiyama, who was announced as one of the two mystery competitors of the edition, picked up a victory over Lady C as she began a winning spree following the events from Stardom New Blood Premium. In the second one, Saya Iida outmatched Miyu Amasaki. A total of eighteen matches occurred, five of them ending in draws generated by over the top rope eliminations or time limits, and the rest of thirteen concluding by pinfall or submission. Xena was presented as the second mystery competitor and was also announced as the newest member of the Club Venus sub-unit.

=== Night 2 (April 1) ===
The second day of the event portraited five tournament confrontations and four tag team side matches. Momo Watanabe and Mai Sakurai, Saki Kashima and Waka Tsukiyama, Xena and Mirai, and Natsuko Tora and Ami Sourei made it to the quarterfinals of the tournament.

=== Night 3 (April 2) ===
The third day of the event saw the four matches of the quarterfinals from which Waka Tsukiyama, Mirai, Ami Sourei and Mai Sakurai emerged to the semifinals. Prominence (Risa Sera, Suzu Suzuki and Hiragi Kurumi) retained the Artist of Stardom Championship for the second time in a row in that respective reign against Queen's Quest's Utami Hayashishita, Saya Kamitani and AZM. Kairi brought Saori Anou into the promotion and they announced that the two of them alongside Natsupoi were going to challenge Sera, Suzuki and Kurumi for the Artist titles at Stardom All Star Grand Queendom on April 23, 2023. Furthermore, Konami reached out via video to challenge Syuri to a UWF rules match on the show from April 15, 2023. Himeka underwent one more of her retirement road bouts in which she teamed up with her independent scene tag team partner Miyuki Takase to defeat Natsupoi and Kakeru Sekiguchi.

=== Night 4 (April 15) ===
The fourth and last day of the event featured the last two phases of the tournament. The first semifinal match in which Mai Sakurai defeated Waka Tsukiyama was broadcast live on Stardom's YouTube channel. Hanako and Sakura Aya faced each other into a time-limit draw in a dark match which took place before the broadcast. In the first match of the main card, Mirai defeated Ami Sourei to advance in the Cinderella Tournament finals. Next up, Mariah May, Xena and Jessie picked up a victory over Hazuki, Koguma and Momo Kohgo. In the fifth match of the night, Natsuko Tora, Starlight Kid, Momo Watanabe, Saki Kashima, Ruaka and Rina defeated Utami Hayashishita, Saya Kamitani, AZM, Lady C, Hina and Miyu Amasaki in a full-unit war. In the sixth bout, Nanae Takahashi, Yuu and Yuna Mizumori defeated Mayu Iwatani, Hanan and Saya Iida. After the match, Mercedes Moné attacked Iwatani ahead of their confrontation for the IWGP Women's Championship from Stardom All Star Grand Queendom on April 23, 2023. Next up, Syuri defeated Konami in singles action. The semi main event of the night portraited the finals of the 2023 Cinderella Tournament edition. Mirai succeeded in defeating Mai Sakurai and winning the tournament for two years in a row, performance achieved only by Mayu Iwatani in the past, in 2015 and 2016.

In the main event, Donna Del Mondo's Giulia, Maika, Himeka Arita and Thekla defeated Cosmic Angels's Tam Nakano, Natsupoi, Mina Shirakawa and Saki in an elimination tag team match as the second last match of Himeka before her retirement. After the match concluded, Giulia and Tam Nakano have held some grudges ahead of their confrontation for the World of Stardom Championship from Stardom All Star Grand Queendom on April 23, 2023. On the same spot, Mina Shirakawa announced that Club Venus parted ways with Cosmic Angels and that they would act as an independent unit. More than that, Waka Tsukiyama was made to choose her unit given the events from the past months related to her losing streak coming to an end. Tsukiyama chose Club Venus in the process. Technically going down to three wrestlers (Nakano, Natsupoi and Unagi Sayaka who was still wandering the independent scene at the moment) and the sub unit of Color's (Saki, Rina Amikura, Hikari Shimizu and Yuko Sakurai), Cosmic Angels was saved by Saori Anou who stepped up into the last moment and joined the unit.

The night closed off with the ceremony of the Cinderella winner Mirai who wore the traditional Cinderella dress as well as the winner trophy.

No.	Results	Stipulations	Times
1^{D}	Hanako vs. Aya Sakura ended in a time-limit draw	Singles match	5:00
2^{P}	Mai Sakurai defeated Waka Tsukiyama	Cinderella tournament semi-finals match	5:52
3	Mirai defeated Ami Sourei	Cinderella tournament semi-finals match	11:12
4	Club Venus (Mariah May, Xena and Jessie) defeated Stars (Hazuki, Koguma and Momo Kohgo)	Six-woman tag team match	9:54
5	Oedo Tai (Natsuko Tora, Starlight Kid, Momo Watanabe, Saki Kashima, Ruaka and Rina) defeated Queen's Quest (Utami Hayashishita, Saya Kamitani, AZM, Lady C, Hina and Miyu Amasaki)	Twelve-woman tag team match	10:47
6	Neo Stardom Army (Nanae Takahashi, Yuu and Yuna Mizumori) defeated Stars (Mayu Iwatani, Hanan and Saya Iida)	Six-woman tag team match	11:46
7	Syuri defeated Konami	Singles match	10:02
8	Mirai defeated Mai Sakurai	Cinderella tournament final	13:12
9	Donna Del Mondo (Giulia, Maika, Himeka and Thekla) defeated Cosmic Angels (Tam Nakano, Natsupoi, Mina Shirakawa and Saki) score (2-1)	Eight-woman tag team elimination match	14:43
D / – this was a dark match; P / – the match was broadcast on the pre-show

== Participants ==
The tournament was the largest to its date, with 36 competitors entering it, including the champions.

*Noted underneath are the champions who held their titles at the time of the tournament.

Wrestler	Unit	Notes
Ami Sourei	God's Eye	Future of Stardom Champion
AZM	Queen's Quest	High Speed Champion
Giulia	Donna Del Mondo	World of Stardom Champion
Hanan	Stars	
Haruka Umesaki	Oedo Tai	Freelancer; New Blood Tag Team Champion
Hazuki	Stars	
Himeka	Donna Del Mondo	
Hina	Queen's Quest	
Koguma	Stars	
Lady C	Queen's Quest	
Mai Sakurai	Donna Del Mondo	
Maika	Donna Del Mondo	
Mariah May	Club Venus	
Mayu Iwatani	Stars	
Mina Shirakawa	Cosmic Angels/Club Venus	
Mirai	God's Eye	Winner
Miyu Amasaki	Queen's Quest	
Momo Kohgo	Stars	
Momo Watanabe	Oedo Tai	
Nanae Takahashi	Neo Stardom Army	Goddesses of Stardom Champion
Natsuko Tora	Oedo Tai	
Natsupoi	Cosmic Angels	
Rina	Oedo Tai	
Ruaka	Oedo Tai	
Saki Kashima	Oedo Tai	
Saya Iida	Stars	
Saya Kamitani	Queen's Quest	Wonder of Stardom Champion
Starlight Kid	Oedo Tai	New Blood Tag Team Champion
Syuri	God's Eye	
Tam Nakano	Cosmic Angels	
Thekla	Donna Del Mondo	
Tomoka Inaba	God's Eye	Freelancer
Utami Hayashishita	Queen's Quest	
Waka Tsukiyama (Note: Revealed as the first mystery competitor.)	Cosmic Angels	
Yuna Mizumori	Neo Stardom Army	Freelancer
Xena (Note: Revealed as the second mystery competitor.)	Club Venus	Freelancer

== Brackets ==
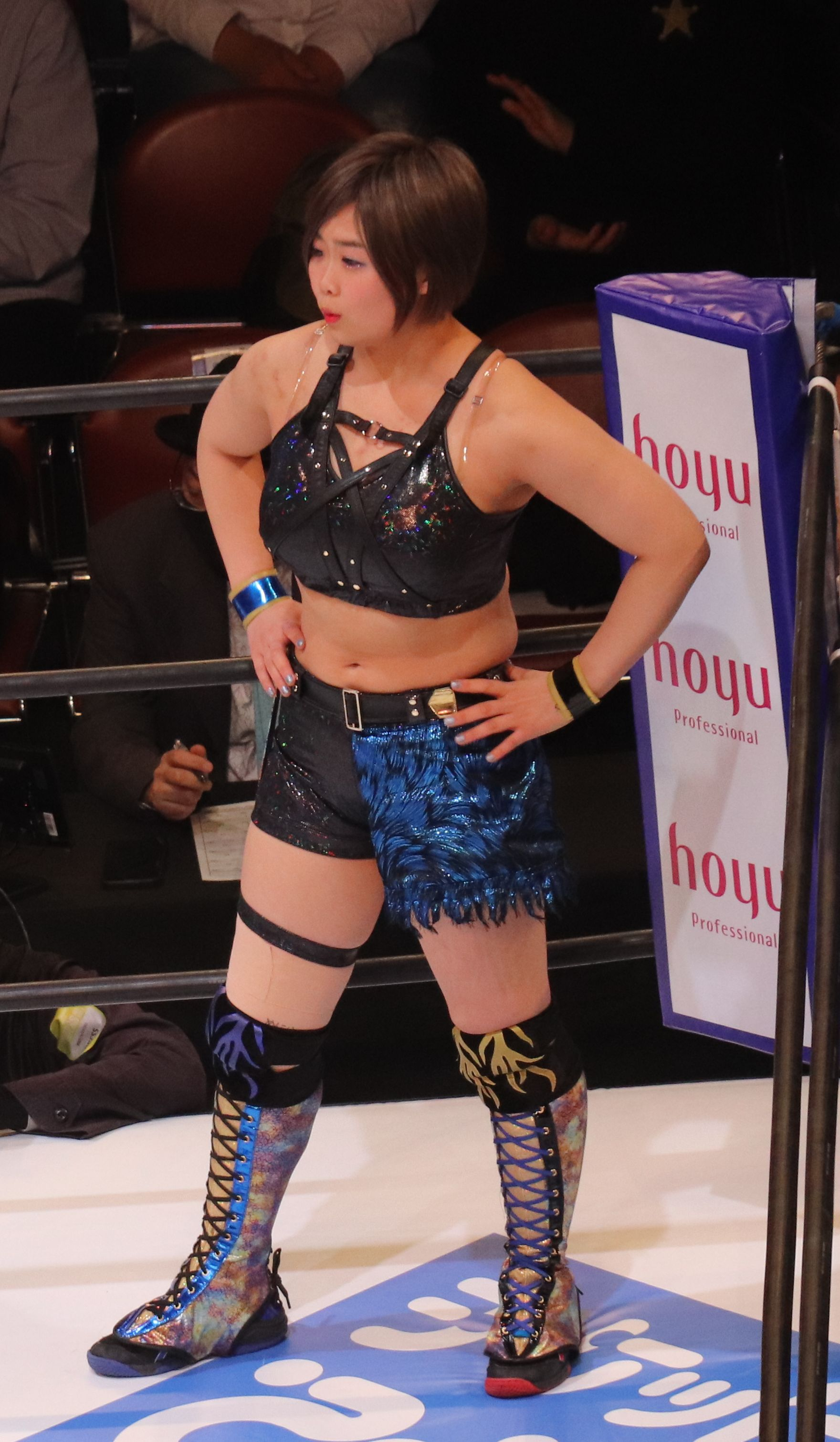
Winner of the 2023 Cinderella Tournament, Mirai.

Round 1 March 26
Giulia	5:46
Mai Sakurai	Elim
AZM	Draw (Note: Hazuki and AZM both went over the top rope, therefore they attracted a double elimination.)
Hazuki	5:20
Natsupoi	Draw (Note: Natsupoi and Shirakawa both went over the top rope, therefore they attracted a double elimination.)
Mina Shirakawa	6:15
Saya Iida	Pin
Miyu Amasaki	6:34

Round 1 March 26
Utami Hayashishita	Draw
Nanae Takahashi	10:00
Maika	5:50
Momo Watanabe	Elim
Mai Sakurai
Bye	N/A
Mariah May	Pin
Rina	5:56
Syuri	Sub
Tomoka Inaba	6:54
Momo Kohgo	4:46
Saki Kashima	Pin
Saya Kamitani	Draw (Note: Kamitani and Iwatani both went over the top rope, therefore they attracted a double elimination.)
Mayu Iwatani	3:49
Lady C	5:01
Waka Tsukiyama	Pin
Hina	4:47
Xena	Pin
Koguma	6:53
Thekla	Pin
Bye	N/A
Saya Iida
Mirai	Pin
Hanan	7:44
Natsuko Tora	Pin
Ruaka	5:41
Tam Nakano	Pin
Himeka	9:06
Ami Sourei	Elim
Yuna Mizumori	5:33
Starlight Kid	Draw (Note: Kid and Umesaki both went over the top rope, therefore they attracted a double elimination.)
Haruka Umesaki	5:47

Round 2 April 1
Bye	N/A
Momo Watanabe
Mai Sakurai	Elim
Mariah May	4:18
Syuri	6:21
Saki Kashima	Pin
Waka Tsukiyama
Bye	N/A
Xena	Pin
Thekla	6:38
Saya Iida	5:13
Mirai	Pin
Natsuko Tora	Elim
Tam Nakano	6:34
Ami Sourei
Bye	N/A

Quarterfinals; April 2
Momo Watanabe	4:58
Mai Sakurai	Pin
Saki Kashima	4:44
Waka Tsukiyama	Pin
Xena	6:23
Mirai	Pin
Natsuko Tora	4:39
Ami Sourei	Elim

Semifinals; April 15
Mai Sakurai	Pin
Waka Tsukiyama	5:52
Mirai	Pin
Ami Sourei	11:12

Final; April 15
Mai Sakurai	13:12
Mirai	Pin
