= Stars (professional wrestling) =

Professional wrestling stable

- Official logo of the stable (2026–present)

Stable
- Leader: Hanan
- Members: Saya Iida; Momo Kohgo; Yuria Hime; Matoi Hamabe; Utami Hayashishita; Maika; Hanako; Waka Tsukiyama
- Former members: See below
- Debut: April 15, 2018
- Years active: 2018–present

Stars (スターズ, Sutāzu) (often stylized in capital letters such as STARS) is a professional wrestling stable, currently performing in the Japanese professional wrestling promotion World Wonder Ring Stardom. Led by Hanan, the stable also consists of Saya Iida, Momo Kohgo, Yuria Hime, Matoi Hamabe, Utami Hayashishita, Maika, Hanako, and Waka Tsukiyama.

== History ==
=== Formation ===
The stable has been considered the union of the well-meaning ladies of the World Wonder Ring Stardom promotion since 2017 and became an official faction in the course of the Stardom Draft from April 15, 2018, with Mayu Iwatani as the basic leader, and Starlight Kid, Saki Kashima, Shiki Shibusawa, Natsumi and Tam Nakano as their five picks. Hanan also remained part of them without being mentioned.

=== Under Mayu Iwatani's leadership (2018–2025) ===
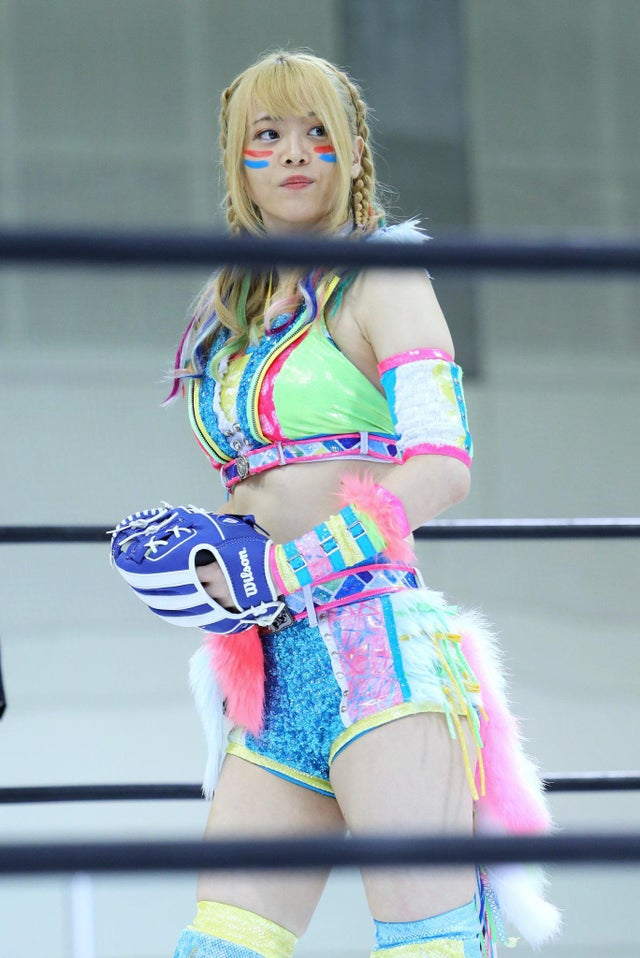
First leader of the stable, Mayu Iwatani.

They had their first match as an official stable on April 21, 2018, at Stardom Rebirth, where Mayu Iwatani, Saki Kashima & Starlight Kid teamed up to defeat Queen's Quest (AZM, Konami and Momo Watanabe) in a six-man tag team match. On June 3, Iwatani and Kashima won the Goddesses of Stardom Championship by defeating Oedo Tai (Hana Kimura and Kagetsu). On September 30, Iwatani, Kashima, and Nakano won the Artist of Stardom Championship by defeating J.A.N. (Jungle Kyona, Kaori Yoneyama and Natsuko Tora). Later that evening, Iwatani and Kashima lost the Goddesses of Stardom Championship to J.A.N. (Jungle Kyona and Natsuko Tora). On December 15, Iwatani tore her MCL in a successful Artist of Stardom Championship defense against Queen's Quest (Konami, Momo Watanabe and Utami Hayashishita). Iwatani wrestled in one more match on December 16 before taking a one-month break to recover.

In April 2019, Iwatani took another month long break to recover from her knee injury. Arisa Hoshiki won the Stardom Cinderella Tournament 2019 by defeating Konami in the finals on April 29. Saki Kashima and Tam Nakano fell short in the first rounds and Starlight Kid made it to the semi-finals. On May 16, Iwatani, Kashima and Nakano lost the Artist of Stardom Championship to Tokyo Cyber Squad (Hana Kimura, Jungle Kyona and Konami). Iwatani, Kashima and Nakano won the Artist of Stardom Championship back from Tokyo Cyber Squad on June 23, then lost it to Oedo Tai (Andras Miyagi, Kagetsu and Sumire Natsu) on July 20.

The first logo of the stable used between 2020 and 2026.

At Stardom Yokohama Cinderella 2020 on October 3, Tokyo Cyber Squad's Jungle Kyona and Konami fell short to Oedo Tai's Natsuko Tora and Saki Kashima in a Loser unit must disband match. After the match, the broken Cyber Squad's Kyona, Death Yama-san, Rina and Ruaka were invited to join Stars which they all accepted. At Stardom Sendai Cinderella 2020 on November 15, Mayu Iwatani dropped the World of Stardom Championship to Utami Hayashishita.

On October 25, 2020, following Tam Nakano's pairing with a debuting Mina Shirakawa into the 2020 edition of the Goddesses of Stardom Tag League, Mayu Iwatani officially announced Shirakawa as a full member of Stars. Nakano would name their tag team as "Cosmic Angels". On November 14, 2020, Unagi Sayaka from Tokyo Joshi Pro Wrestling debuted in Stardom and joined the sub-unit of Cosmic Angels. At Road to Osaka Dream Cinderella - Day 2 on December 16, 2020, Nakano, Shirakawa and Sayaka teamed up to defeat Oedo Tai's Bea Priestley, Natsuko Tora and Saki Kashima to win the Artist of Stardom Championship. On December 20, 2020, at Osaka Dream Cinderella, Nakano announced that she, Shirakawa and Sayaka were splitting from Stars to act as a separate stable.

At Stardom Yokohama Dream Cinderella 2021 on April 4, Mayu Iwatani, Saya Iida, Starlight Kid, Hanan and Gokigen Death fell short to Oedo Tai's Natsuko Tora, Ruaka, Konami, Saki Kashima and Rina in a Ten-woman elimination tag team match in which the last one eliminated was forced to join the enemy unit. Since Gokigen Death was eliminated last, she was forced to join Oedo Tai. At the beginning of the Stardom Cinderella Tournament 2021, Stars only counted four members. Iwatani, Hanan and Starlight Kid, with all of them being scheduled to take part into the tournament except Saya Iida who was out with injury. On the first night from April 10, Hanan fell short to Himeka, Starlight Kid defeated Momo Watanabe, and Mayu Iwatani defeated Fukigen Death, all matches having been disputed in the first-round matches. On the second night from May 14, Starlight Kid fell short to Saya Kamitani and Mayu Iwatani to Himeka in the second-round mactches. Koguma made her return and saved Stars from an Oedo Tai attack and subsequently joined the unit. On the third night from June 12, Mayu Iwatani, Starlight Kid, Hanan, Koguma and Rin Kadokura, an associate from Pro Wrestling Wave teamed up to fall short to Oedo Tai's Natsuko Tora, Konami, Fukigen Death, Ruaka and Saki Kashima in another Ten-woman elimination tag team match, where this time Starlight Kid was the last to get eliminated and was forced to join Oedo Tai since. At Yokohama Dream Cinderella 2021 in Summer on July 4, Mayu Iwatani and Koguma unsuccessfully challenged Alto Livello Kabaliwan (Giulia and Syuri) for the Goddesses of Stardom Championship. Mayu Iwatani and Koguma were the only members of Stars to compete in the Stardom 5 Star Grand Prix 2021. They both wrestled in the "Red Stars" and scored a tying eleven points. At Stardom 10th Anniversary Grand Final Osaka Dream Cinderella on October 9, 2021, Hazuki defeated Koguma in her return match and mayu Iwatani fell short to Tam Nakano in a Wonder of Stardom Championship match. At the 2021 edition of the Goddesses of Stardom Tag League, Hazuki and Koguma competed as the team of FWC, Mayu Iwatani alongside Rin Kadokura went under the name of Blue MaRine, and Hanan engaged in a makeshift team with Rina known as Water & Oil. BlueMarine competed in the "Blue Goddess Block" and the other two sub-units in the "Red Goddess Block". Hazuki and Koguma would eventually win the tournament by defeating previous winner MOMOAZ (Momo Watanabe and AZM). During the event, on November 4, Hazuki joined the unit. At Osaka Super Wars, the last event from December 18, 2021, Mayu Iwatani, Hazuki and Koguma teamed up to compete in a ¥10 Million Unit Tournament. They defeated Cosmic Angels (Tam Nakano, Mina Shirakawa and Unagi Sayaka) in the semi-finals but fell short to MaiHimePoi (Maika, Natsupoi and Himeka) in the finals which were also disputed for the Artist of Stardom Championship. At Stardom Dream Queendom on December 29, 2021, Hanan defeated Ruaka to win the Future of Stardom Championship.

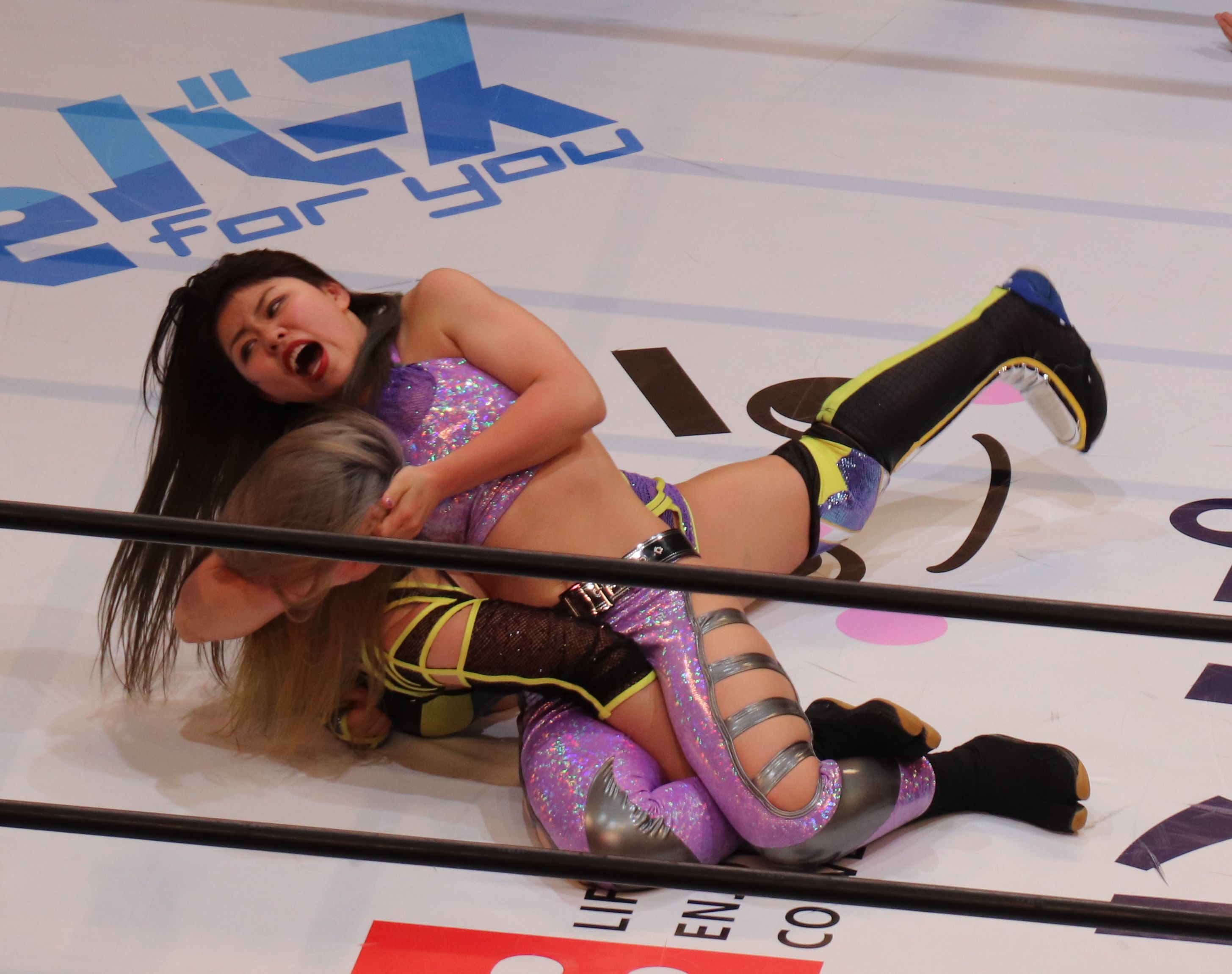
Hazuki facing Momo Watanabe at Stardom World Climax 2022 on March 27.

At Stardom in Osaka event from January 23, 2022, Momo Kohgo requested Stars members to let her join the unit which the latters accepted. At Stardom Nagoya Supreme Fight on January 29, 2022, Hazuki and Koguma defeated Maika and Himeka to retain the Goddesses of Stardom Championship. At Stardom Cinderella Journey on February 23, 2022, Hanan defended the Future of Stardom title successfully against fellow stablemate Momo Kohgo and Hazuki and Koguma successfully defended the Goddesses of Stardom Championship against Mina Shirakawa and Unagi Sayaka. At Stardom New Blood 1 on March 11, 2022, a returning Saya Iida defeated Professional Wrestling Just Tap Out's Tomoka Inaba and Aoi. On the first night of the Stardom World Climax 2022 from March 25, Hazuki and Koguma dropped the Goddess titles to Black Desire (Momo Watanabe and Starlight Kid). At Stardom Golden Week Fight Tour on May 5, 2022, Hazuki and Koguma regained the Goddesses of Stardom Championship by defeating Momo Watanabe and Starlight Kid and becoming the first team to ever win the titles on more than one occasion. Mayu Iwatani won the SWA World Championship by defeating Thekla and becoming the promotion's second-ever "grand slam champion" alongside Io Shirai, winning all the available championships except the Future of Stardom title which is not required. At Stardom Flashing Champions on May 28, 2022, Hazuki and Koguma successfully defended the Goddesses of Stardom Championship against Giulia and Mai Sakurai. At Stardom Fight in the Top on June 26, 2022, Mayu Iwatani, Koguma and Hazuki defeated Queen's Quest's Utami Hayashishita, Saya Kamitani and AZM in one of the first steel cage matches ever promoted by Stardom. At Mid Summer Champions in Nagoya from July 24, 2022, Hazuki and Koguma successfully defended the Goddesses of Stardom Championship against Ami Sourei and Mirai. At Stardom x Stardom: Nagoya Midsummer Encounter on August 21, 2022, Hazuki and Koguma dropped the Goddesses of Stardom Championship to Tam Nakano and Natsupoi. At Stardom New Blood 5 on October 19, 2022, Hanan dropped the Future of Stardom Championship to Ami Sourei. At Hiroshima Goddess Festival on November 3, 2022, Mayu Iwatani defeated Alpha Female to retain the SWA World Championship. After the match, Iwatani relinquished the title to focus on the IWGP Women's Championship. At Stardom Gold Rush on November 19, 2022, Mayu Iwatani, Hazuki and Koguma won a "Moneyball tournament" by defeating Giulia, Thekla and Mai Sakurai in the finals. At Stardom in Showcase vol.3 on November 26, 2022, Koguma defeated AZM, Starlight Kid and Ram Kaicho in a Falls Count Anywhere four-way match, Mayu Iwatani and Hanan teamed up with Maika to defeat Queen's Quest (Utami Hayashishita and Hina) and Mirai in a Judo jacket rules match, and Hazuki teamed up with Natsu Sumire and wrestled Oedo Tai (Natsuko Tora and Saki Kashima) into a no-contest in a No Holds Barred Tag team match. At Stardom Dream Queendom 2022 on December 29, Saya Iida who wrestled under the "Super Strong Stardom Machine" won an annual Stardom Rambo alongside Lady C who also wrestled under the gimmick of "Super Strong Stardom Giant Machine", and Mayu Iwatani, Momo Kohgo and Hanan defeated stablemates Hazuki, Koguma and Saya Iida in six-way tag team competition.

In the Triangle Derby I which started on January 3 and concluded on March 4, 2023, the unit has had benn represented by two distinctive teams, H&M's (Mayu Iwatani, Hanan and Momo Kohgo) and Classmates (Hazuki, Koguma and Saya Iida), however none of them qualified for the finals. At Stardom Supreme Fight 2023 on February 4, Hazuki, Saya Iida and Koguma defeated Unique Glare (Starlight Kid, Karma and Ruaka). At Stardom in Showcase vol.4 on February 26, 2023, Hanan fell short to AZM, Momoka Hanazono and Natsu Sumire, and Mayu Iwatani, Hazuki and Koguma defeated Queen's Quest (Utami Hayashishita, Saya Kamitani and Miyu Amasaki) and Oedo Tai (Natsuko Tora, Starlight Kid and Momo Watanabe) in a Three-way elimination tag team match. In the 2023 edition of the Cinderella Tournament, the unit was represented by Hanan, Hazuki, Koguma, Mayu Iwatani, Momo Kohgo and Saya Iida, with Iida scoring the best result by making it to the second rounds. At Stardom All Star Grand Queendom on April 23, 2023, Hazuki teamed up with Fuwa-chan, falling short to Miyu Amasaki and Utami Hayashishita, and Mayu Iwatani defeated Mercedes Moné to win the IWGP Women's Championship. At Stardom Fukuoka Goddess Legend on May 5, 2023, Mayu Iwatani and Hanan defeated Club Venus (Mariah May and Jessie), and Hazuki and Koguma unsuccessfully challenged The New Eras (Ami Sourei and Mirai) for the Goddesses of Stardom Championship. At Stardom Flashing Champions 2023 on May 27, Momo Kohgo defeated Lady C and stablemate Saya Iida in three-way competition, and Mayu Iwatani, Hanan, Hazuki and Koguma defeated Club Venus (Mariah May, Xena, Jessie and Waka Tsukiyama) in eight-woman tag team competition. At Stardom Sunshine 2023 on June 25, Momo Kohgo, Hanan and Saya Iida defeated Waka Tsukiyama, Yuna Mizumori and Aya Sakura, and Mayu Iwatani, Hazuki and Koguma unsuccessfully challenged Baribari Bombers (Giulia, Thekla and Mai Sakurai) for the Artist of Stardom Championship. At Stardom Mid Summer Champions 2023 on July 2, Hazuki and Saya Iida teamed up with Aya Sakura, falling short to Suzu Suzuki, Mei Seira and Hanako, and Mayu Iwatani, Hanan, Koguma and Momo Kohgo fell short to Queen's Quest (Utami Hayashishita, Saya Kamitani, AZM and Lady C). At the 2023 edition of the Stardom 5 Star Grand Prix, the stable had been represented by Hanan, Hazuki and Mayu Iwatani, with Iwatani scoring the best result, accumulating 11 points, but failing to qualify into the finals. At Stardom x Stardom: Osaka Summer Team on August 13, 2023, Koguma unsuccessfully challenged Saki Kashima for the High Speed Championship, and Mayu Iwatani defeated Utami Hayashishita to retain the IWGP Women's Championship. At Stardom Midsummer Festival on August 19, 2023, Mayu Iwatani and Koguma defeated Saki Kashima and Syuri. At Stardom 5Star Special in Hiroshima on September 3, 2023, Mayu Iwatani fell short to Syuri, and Momo Kohgo unsuccessfully challenged Saki Kashima for the High Speed Championship. At Stardom Dream Tag Festival on September 10, the unit's members competed in shuffled tag team bouts in which Hanan teamed up with Club Venus' Mariah May to defeat stablemate Momo Kohgo and Oedo Tai's Momo Watanabe, and Mayu Iwatani teamed up with Saki Kashima in a losing effort to AZM and Starlight Kid. At Stardom Nagoya Golden Fight 2023 on October 9, Koguma, Hazuki, and Saya Iida fell short to Mayu Iwatani who teamed up with Nanae Takahashi and Kairi. At Stardom Halloween Dark Night on October 29, 2023, Hazuki competed in a Four-way "Halloween Weapons" match won by Saori Anou and also involving Mai Sakurai and Natsuko Tora, while Mayu Iwatani competed in a Coffin match won by Yuu ans also involving Megan Bayne and Maika. At Stardom Gold Rush 2023 on November 18, Hazuki, Hanan and Saya Iida competed in a Six-woman tag team Moneyball tournament in which they defeated Konami, Ami Sourei and Hanako in the semifinals only to fall short to Baribari Bombers (Giulia, Thekla and Mai Sakurai) in a match which was also disputed for the Artist of Stardom Championship. At Stardom Nagoya Big Winter on December 2, 2023, Hanan and Saya Iida fell short to Saori Anou and Yuna Mizumori, while Hazuki unsuccessfully challenged Suzu Suzuki for the second spot in a match for the vacant World of Stardom Championship. At Stardom Dream Queendom 2023 on December 29, Mayu Iwatani, Hanan, Hazuki and Saya Iida defeated Starlight Kid, Ruaka, Rina and Fukigen Death in eight-woman tag team competition.

After losing the IWGP Women's Championship to Syuri at All Star Grand Queendom on April 27, 2025, Mayu announced in a press conference that she was leaving STARDOM, thus ending her tenure with STARS.

=== Under Hanan's leadership (2025–present) ===
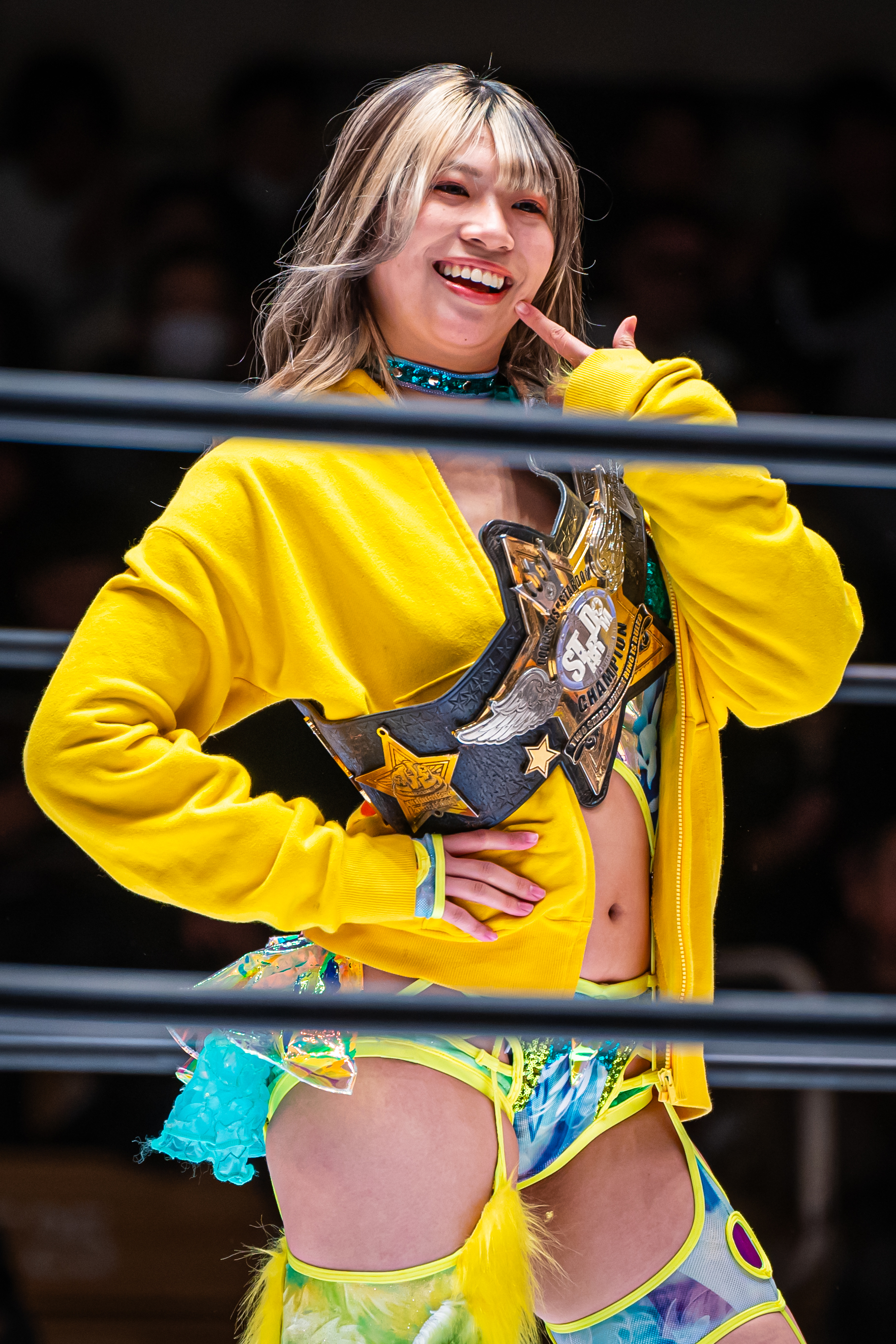
Second leader of the stable, Hanan

On May 11, 2025, FWC teamed with the unit members for the last time against God’s Eye, winning the match. Afterwards, FWC officially departed from the unit to pursue new worldwide opportunities.

=== New Blood series (2022–present) ===
Various of the unit's members often compete in the New Blood series of events. At Stardom New Blood 6 on December 16, 2022, Momo Kohgo, Saya Iida and Hanan fell short to God's Eye (Mirai, Tomoka Inaba and Nanami).

At Stardom New Blood 7 on January 20, 2023, Momo Kohgo teamed up with Momoka Hanazono in a losing effort against Mai Sakurai and Chanyota, and wing★gori (Hanan and Iida) fell short against Ami Sourei and Nanami in the quarterfinals of the inaugural New Blood Tag Team Championship. At Stardom New Blood Premium on March 25, 2023, Hanan teamed up with Hina to defeat stablemates Momo Kohgo and Saya Iida, and the team of YoungOED (Rina and Ruaka). At Stardom New Blood 8 on May 12, 2023, Hanan teamed up with Hina and wrestled Tomoka Inaba and Azusa Inaba into a time-limit draw. At Stardom New Blood 9 on Hanan and Saya Iida defeated Kohaku and Ruaka. At Stardom New Blood 10 on August 18, 2023, Hanan teamed up with Hina in a losing effort against Suzu Suzuki and Mei Seira, and Saya Iida fell short to Nanae Takahashi. At Stardom New Blood 11 on September 29, wing★gori became the New Blood Tag Team Champions by defeating Bloody Fate. At Stardom New Blood West 1 on November 17, 2023, Saya Iida defeated Mai Sakurai and Hanan wrestled Mei Seira into a time-limit draw. At Stardom New Blood 12 on December 25, 2023, Hanan and Saya Iida defeated Reiwa Tokyo Towers (Ami Sohrei and Lady C) to retain the New Blood Tag Team Championship.

=== New Japan Pro Wrestling (2020–present) ===
Due to Stardom's relationship with New Japan Pro Wrestling, various of the unit's members are often competing in the latter's promotion events. On January 4, 2020, at Wrestle Kingdom 14, Mayu Iwatani teamed up with Arisa Hoshiki to defeat Hana Kimura and Giulia. On January 5, 2021, at Wrestle Kingdom 15, Iwatani teamed up with Tam Nakano in a losing effort against Alto Livello Kabaliwan (Giulia and Syuri). On January 5, 2022, at Wrestle Kingdom 16, Iwatani teamed up with Starlight Kid in a losing effort against Tam Nakano and Saya Kamitani. At Historic X-Over on November 20, 2022, Saya Iida, Hanan, Koguma and Momo Kohgo competed in the Stardom Rambo, while Mayu Iwatani unsuccessfully challenged Kairi in the finals of the inaugural IWGP Women's Championship.

On April 23, 2023, at All Star Grand Queendom, Iwatani captured the IWGP Women's Championship by defeating Mercedes Moné.

== Members ==
Stars
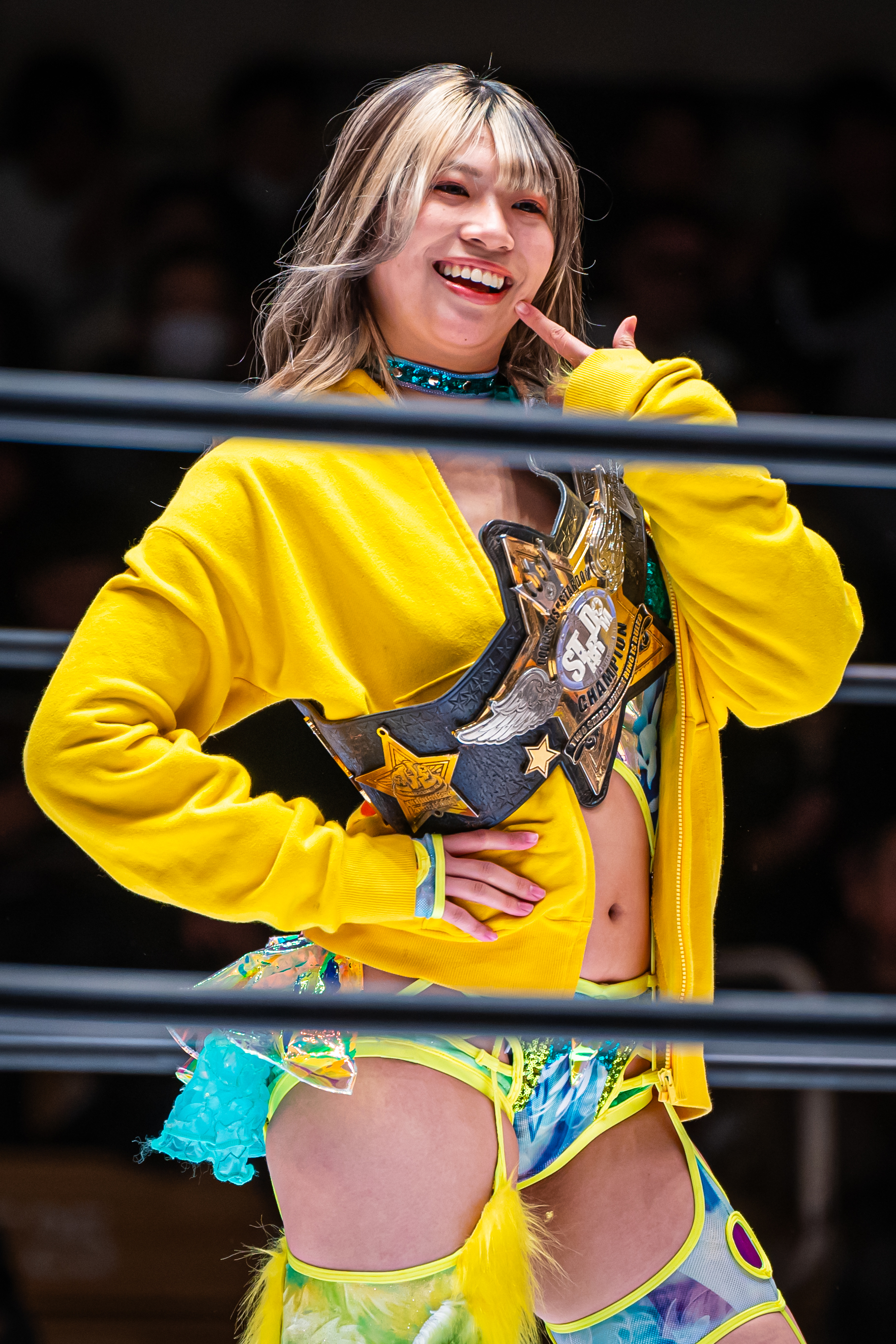
Hanan (II)

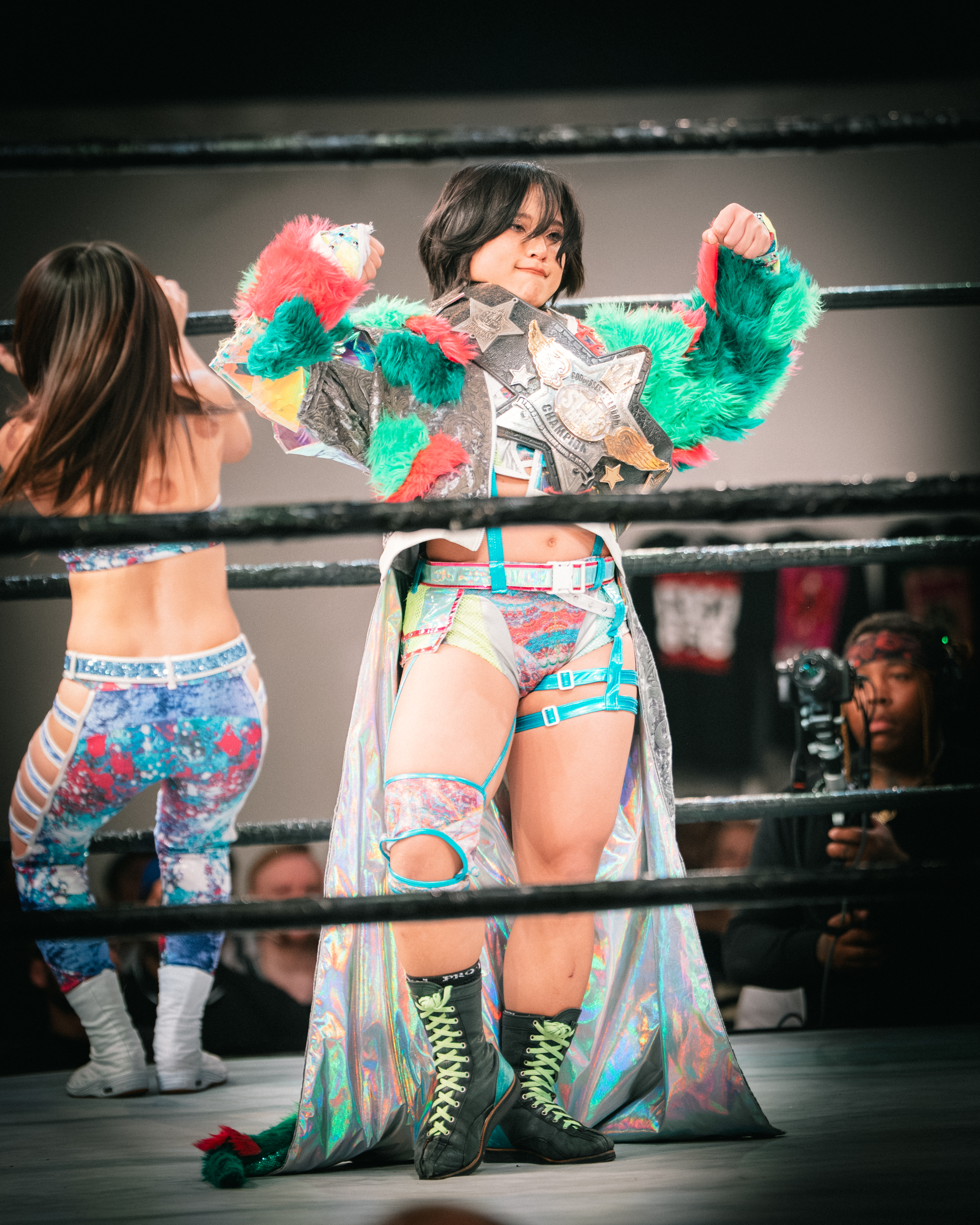
Saya Iida

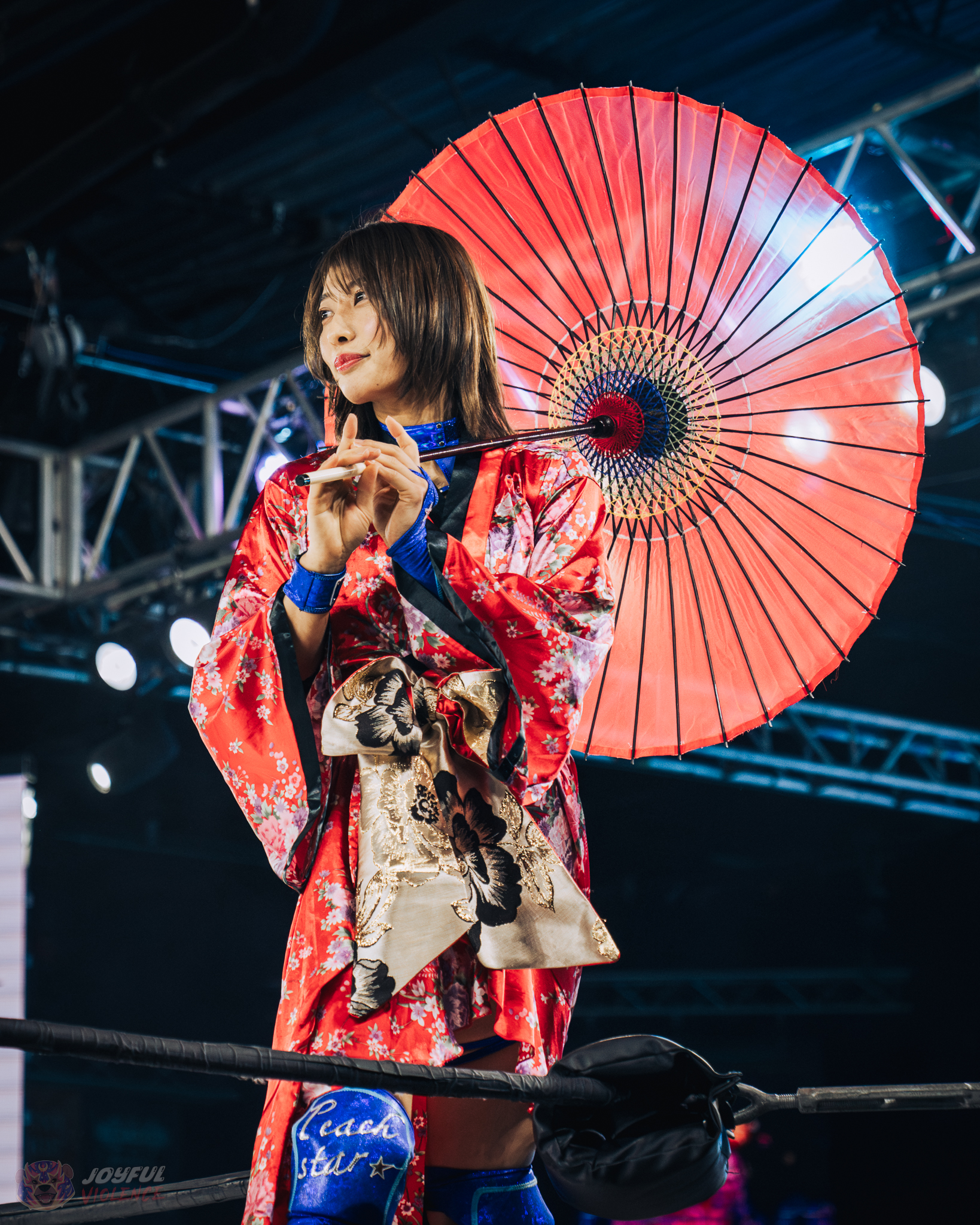
Momo Kohgo

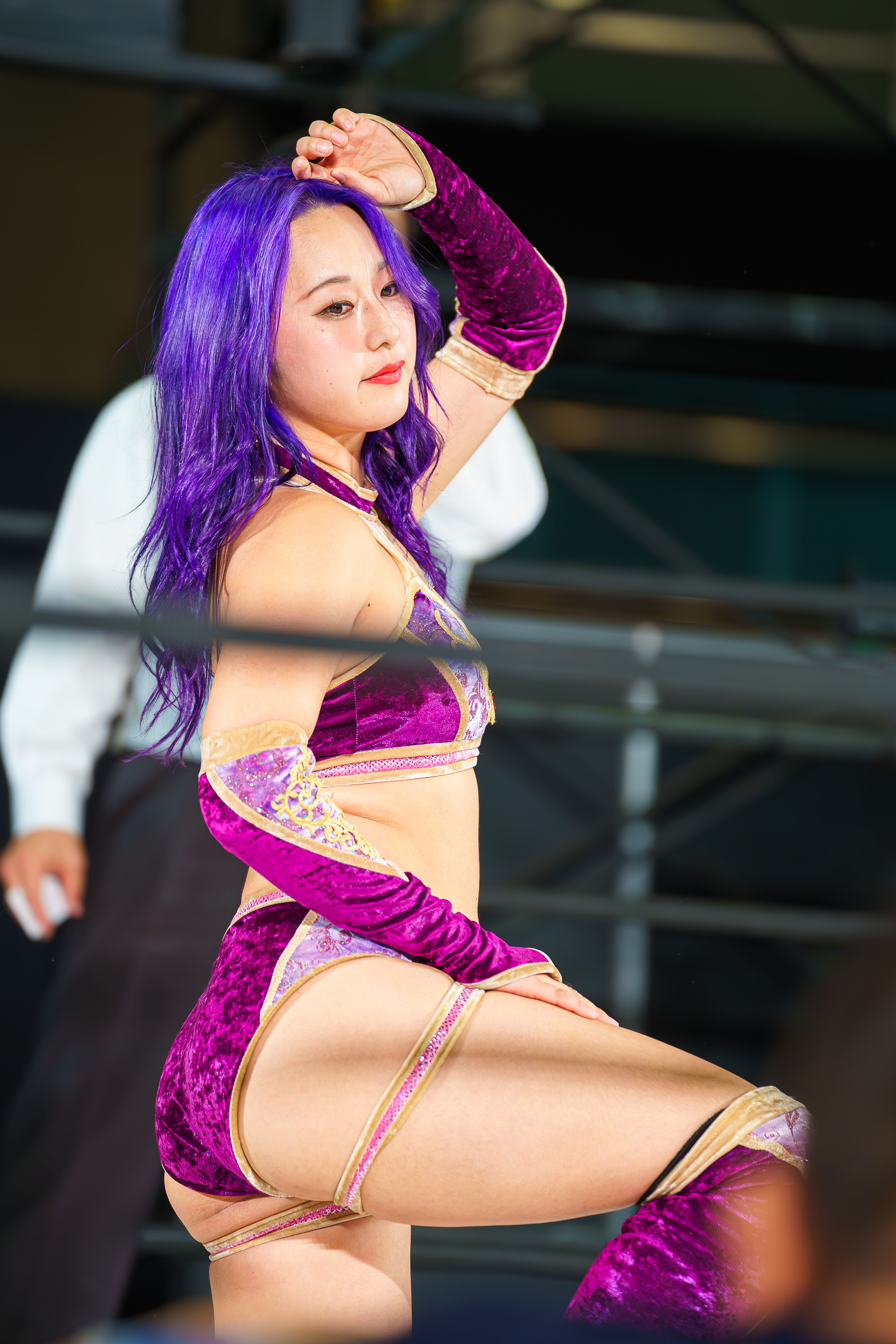
Yuria Hime

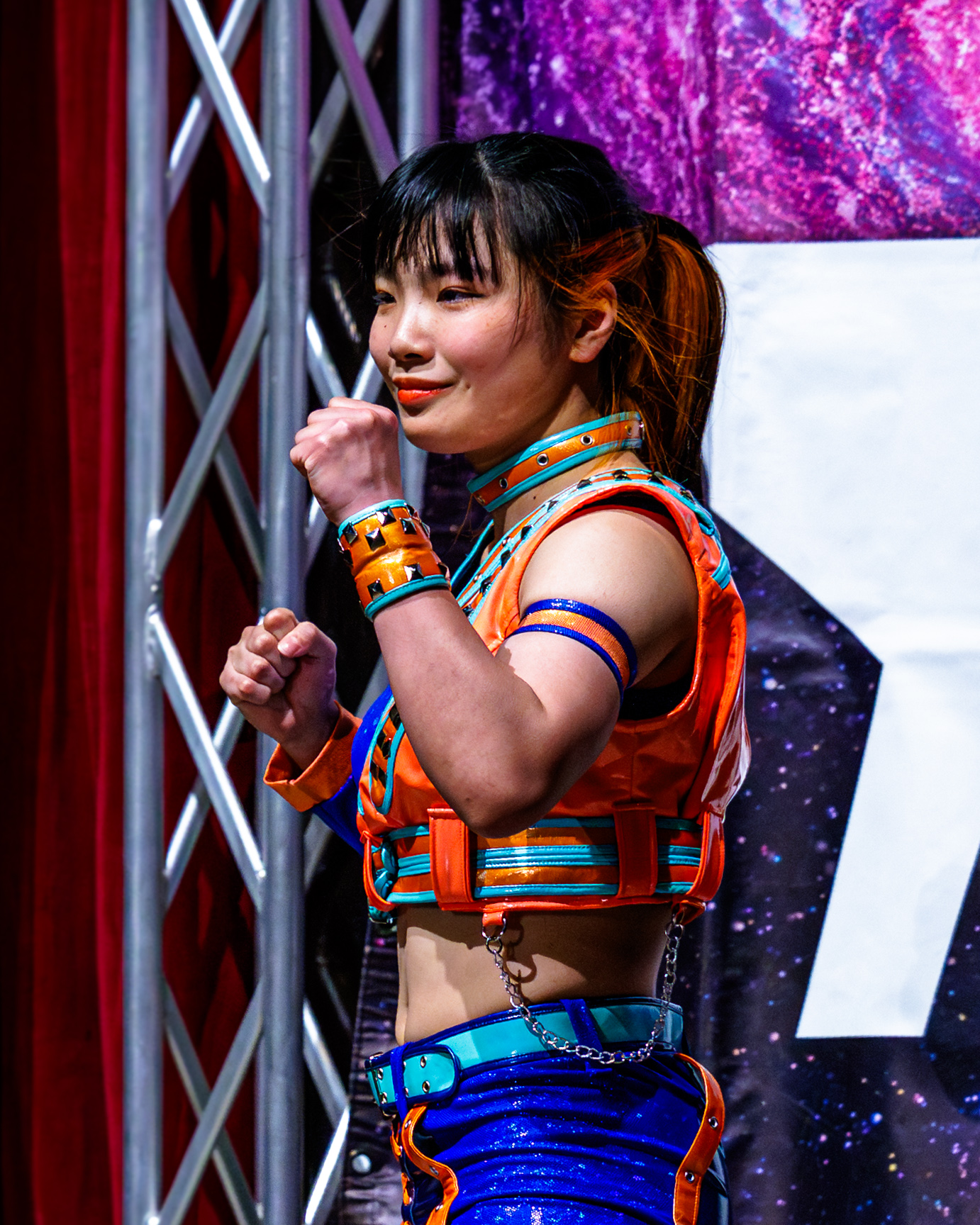
Matoi Hamabe

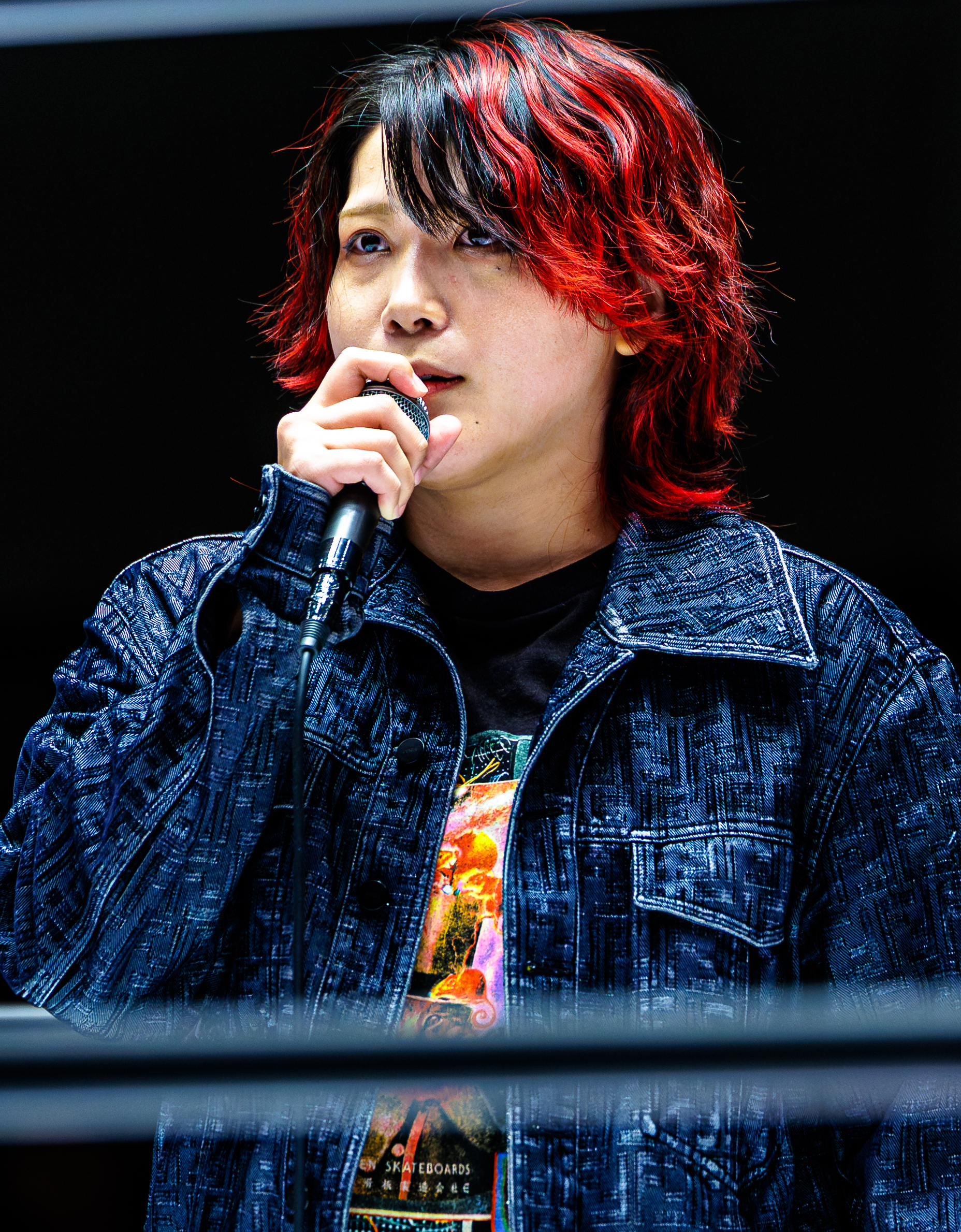
Utami Hayashishita

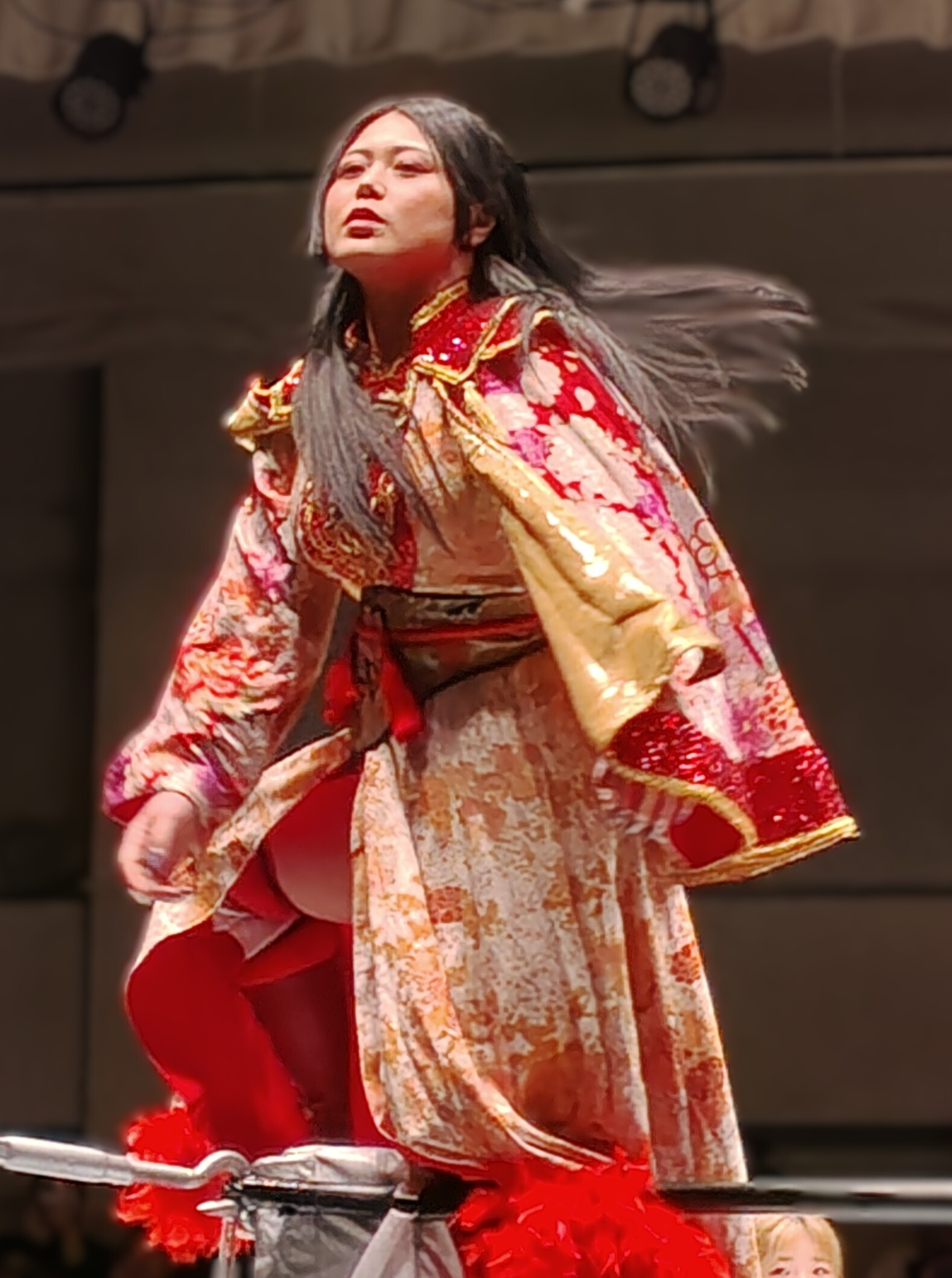
Maika

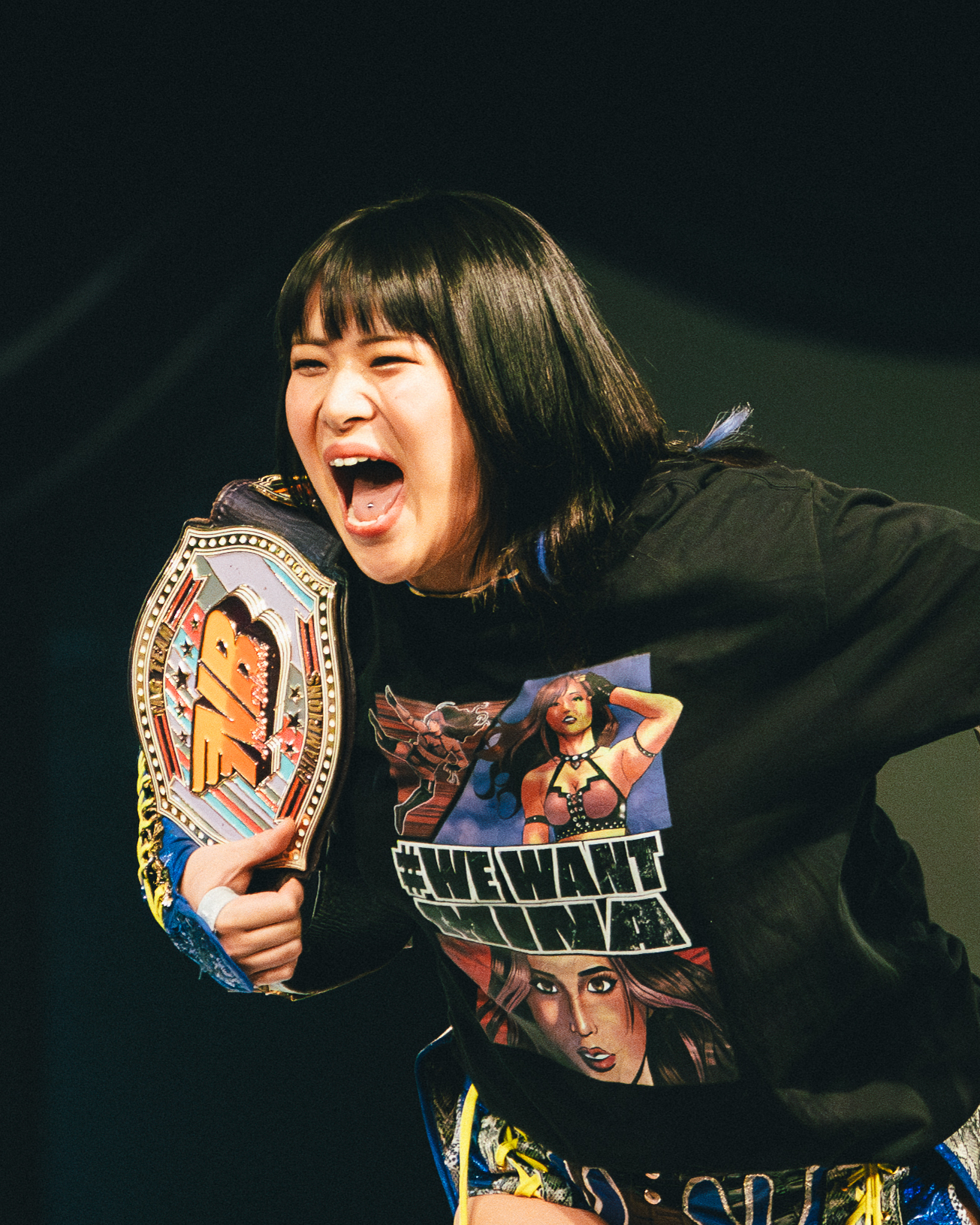
Hanako

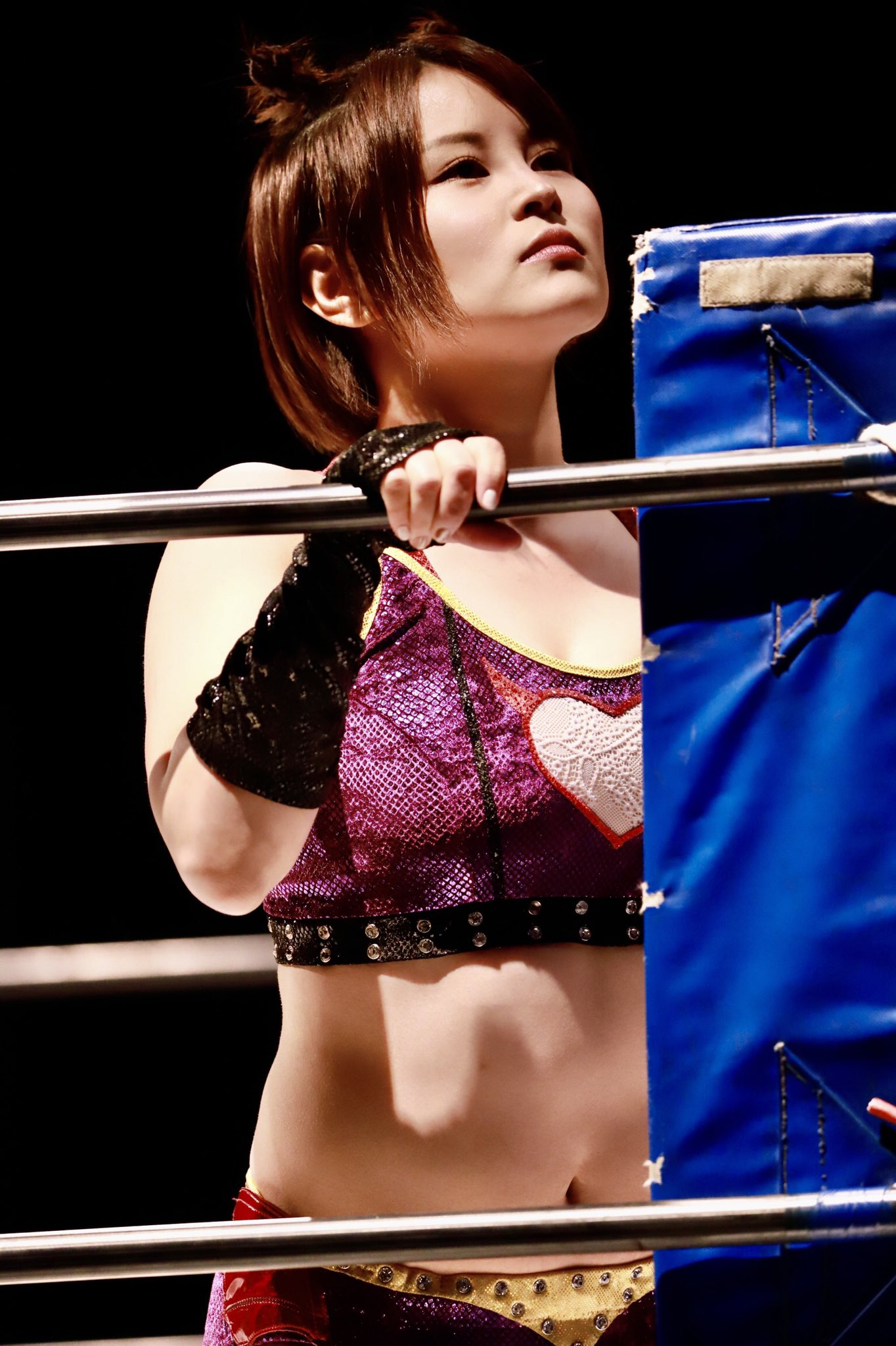
Waka Tsukiyama

*	Founding member
I-II	Leader(s)

=== Current ===
Member		Joined
Hanan (Note: Mayu Iwatani left Stardom on April 28, 2025, thus leaving the leader spot vacant. Hanan has acted as the leader of the unit since May 11, 2025.)	*II	April 15, 2018
Saya Iida (Note: Often competes as Super Strong Stardom Machine)		April 14, 2019
Momo Kohgo		January 23, 2022
Yuria Hime		August 17, 2025
Matoi Hamabe		June 20, 2026
Utami Hayashishita		September 29, 2026
Maika		September 29, 2026
Hanako		September 29, 2026
Waka Tsukiyama		September 29, 2026

=== Former ===
Member		Joined	Left
Natsumi	*	April 15, 2018	January 14, 2019
Alex Gracia		January 2, 2019	February 24, 2019
Shiki Shibusawa	*	April 15, 2018	March 28, 2019
Xia Brookside		March 9, 2019	March 28, 2019
Saki Kashima	*	April 15, 2018	January 3, 2020
Arisa Hoshiki		November 23, 2018	May 20, 2020
Itsuki Hoshino		January 3, 2020	September 28, 2020
Rina		October 4, 2020	October 29, 2020
Mina Shirakawa		October 25, 2020	December 20, 2020
Tam Nakano	*	April 15, 2018	December 20, 2020
Unagi Sayaka		November 14, 2020	December 20, 2020
Ruaka		October 4, 2020	February 20, 2021
Gokigen Death		October 4, 2020	April 4, 2021
Starlight Kid	*	April 15, 2018	June 12, 2021
Jungle Kyona		October 4, 2020	September 30, 2021
Yuzuki		January 14, 2024	March 31, 2024
Mayu Iwatani	*I	April 15, 2018	April 28, 2025
Hazuki		November 4, 2021	May 11, 2025
Koguma		May 15, 2021	May 11, 2025
Bea Priestley		September 14, 2025	April 26, 2026

== Sub-groups ==
=== Current ===
Affiliate	Members	Tenure	Type
wing★gori	Hanan; Saya Iida	2020–present	Tag team
Peach & Lily	Momo Kohgo; Yuria Hime	2025-present	Tag team
Hai High Mate	Maika; Hanako	2026-present	Tag team
Rice or Bread	Hanako; Waka Tsukiyama	2026-present	Tag team

=== Former ===
Affiliate	Members	Tenure	Type
ShiKid	Shiki Shibusawa; Starlight Kid	2018-2019	Tag team
Iwatani and Kashima	Mayu Iwatani; Saki Kashima	2018	Tag team
AMA	Arisa Hoshiki; Mayu Iwatani	2019	Tag team
DREAM SHiNE	Tam Nakano; Arisa Hoshiki	2019–2020	Tag team
Cosmic Angels	Tam Nakano; Mina Shirakawa; Unagi Sayaka	2020	Tag team/Trio (Note: Split to form their own faction.)
MK☆Sisters	Mayu Iwatani; Starlight Kid	2020–2021	Tag team
FWC/Fukuoka Double Crazy	Hazuki; Koguma	2021–2025	Tag team
BlueMarine	Mayu Iwatani; Rin Kadokura	2021	Tag team (Note: These teams only activated in the 2021 edition of the Goddesses of Stardom Tag League.)
Water & Oil	Rina; Hanan (Note: This team only activated in the 2021 Goddesses of Stardom Tag League. Rina was not part of the stable.)	2021	Tag team
H&M's	Mayu Iwatani; Hanan; Momo Kohgo	2023–2025	Trio
Iwatani and Koguma	Mayu Iwatani; Koguma	2023–2025	Tag team
Eye Contact	Hanan; Mayu Iwatani	2023–2025	Tag team
Classmates	Hazuki; Koguma; Saya Iida	2023–2025	Trio
Peach☆Rock	Mayu Iwatani; Momo Kohgo	2024–2025	Tag team
Gorilla Trigger	Saya Iida; Bea Priestley	2025-2026	Tag team

== Championships and accomplishments ==
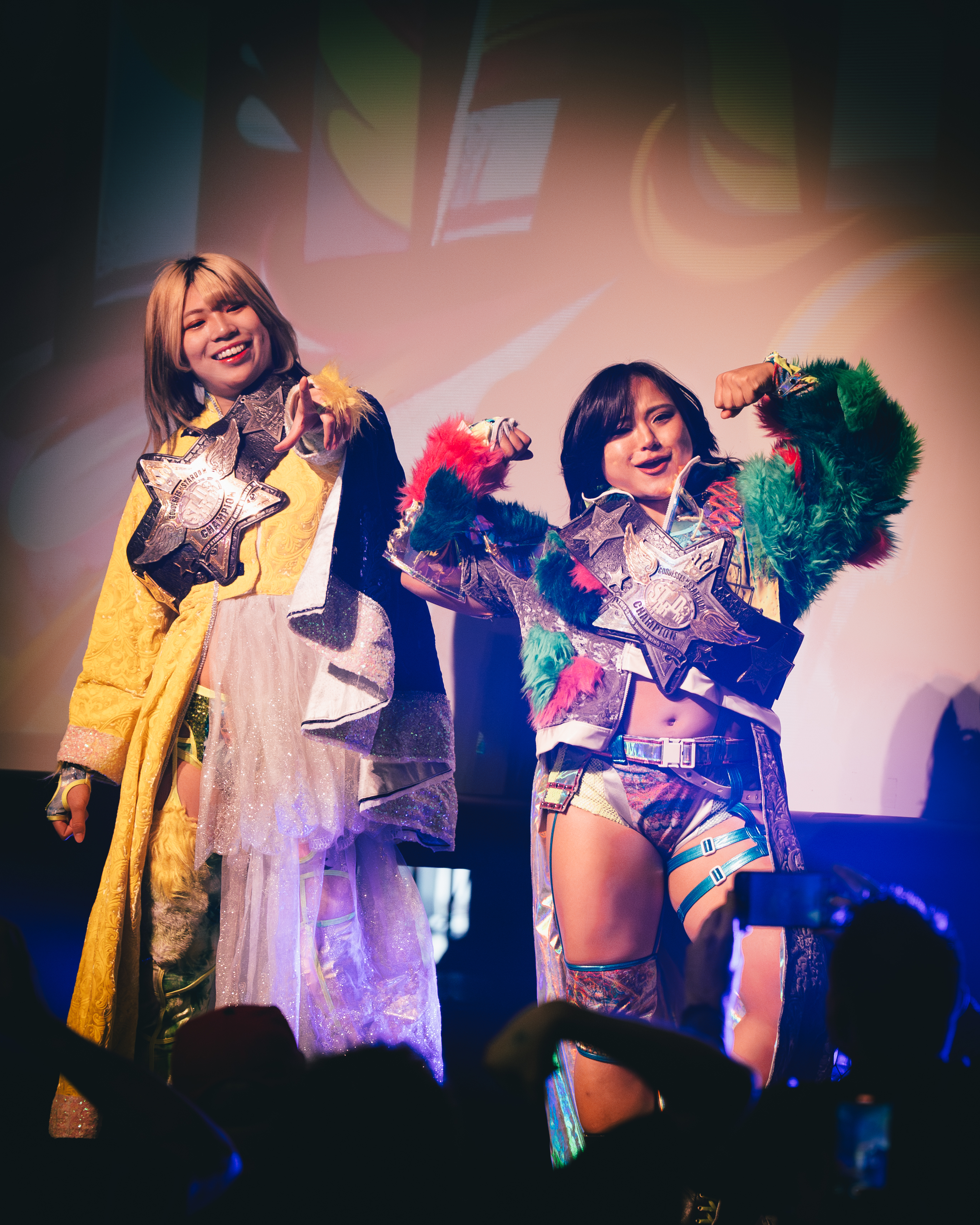
wing★gori (Hanan (left) and Saya Iida (right)) as Goddesses of Stardom Champions in April 2025.

- New Japan Pro Wrestling
  - IWGP Women's Championship (1 time) – Mayu Iwatani
- Oz Academy
  - Oz Academy Tag Team Championship (1 time) – Hazuki and Koguma
- Pro-Wrestling: EVE
  - Pro-Wrestling: EVE Tag Team Championship (1 time, current) – Hanako and Maika
- Pro Wrestling Illustrated
  - Singles wrestlers
    - Ranked Arisa Hoshiki No. 28 of the top 100 female singles wrestlers in the PWI Women's 100 in 2019
    - Ranked Hanan No. 132 of the top 150 female singles wrestlers in the PWI Women's 150 in 2022
    - Ranked Hazuki No. 101 of the top 150 female singles wrestlers in the PWI Women's 150 in 2022
    - Ranked Koguma No. 91 of the top 150 female singles wrestlers in the PWI Women's 150 in 2022
    - Ranked Mayu Iwatani No. 9 of the top 100 female singles wrestlers in the PWI Women's 100 in 2018
    - Ranked Kid No. 51 of the top 100 female singles wrestlers in the PWI Women's 100 in 2018
    - Ranked Tam Nakano No. 76 of the top 100 female singles wrestlers in the PWI Women's 100 in 2018
  - Tag teams
    - Ranked FWC (Hazuki and Koguma) No. 5 of the top 100 tag teams in the PWI Tag Team 100 of 2022
- Spark Joshi Puroresu of America
  - Spark Joshi World Championship (1 time) – Hazuki
- Tokyo Sports
  - Women's Wrestling Grand Prize – Mayu Iwatani (2019)
  - Topic Award - Mayu Iwatani (2024)
- World Wonder Ring Stardom
  - Artist of Stardom Championship (3 times) – Mayu Iwatani, Saki Kashima and Tam Nakano (2), and Mina Shirakawa, Tam Nakano and Unagi Sayaka (1)
  - Future of Stardom Championship (3 times) – Hanan, Starlight Kid (inaugural) and Saya Iida
  - Goddesses of Stardom Championship (5 times) – Hazuki and Koguma (3), Mayu Iwatani and Saki Kashima (1) and Hanan and Saya Iida (1)
  - New Blood Tag Team Championship (1 time) – Hanan and Saya Iida
  - SWA World Championship (1 time) – Mayu Iwatani
  - Wonder of Stardom Championship (1 times) – Arisa Hoshiki
  - World of Stardom Championship (1 time) – Mayu Iwatani
  - Cinderella Tournament – Arisa Hoshiki (2019) and Hanan (2024)
  - Stardom 5Star Grand Prix Tournament
    - (2018) - Mayu Iwatani
  - Goddesses of Stardom Tag League
    - (2021) – Hazuki and Koguma
    - (2024) – Hanan and Saya Iida
  - 5★Star GP Award (4 times)
    - Red Stars Best Match Award (2021) – Giulia vs. Mayu Iwatani
    - Red Stars Best Match Award (2024) vs. Maika on August 23 in Red Stars A – Hazuki
    - Red Stars Best Match Award (2024) vs. Momo Watanabe on August 15 in Red Stars B – Iwatani
    - 5★Star GP Outstanding Performance (2024) – Hanan
  - Stardom Year-End Award (11 times)
    - Best Match Award (2018) – Io Shirai and Mayu Iwatani vs. Hazuki and Kagetsu
    - Best Match Award (2019) Arisa Hoshiki vs. Tam Nakano
    - Best Match Award (2020) Mayu Iwatani vs. Utami Hayashishita
    - Best Tag Team Award – Hazuki and Koguma (2021)
    - Best Technique Award – Starlight Kid (2018)
    - Best Unit Award (2018, 2022)
    - MVP Award – Mayu Iwatani (2018)
    - Outstanding Performance Award – Arisa Hoshiki (2019), Mayu Iwatani (2023)
    - Special Merit Award – Mayu Iwatani (2021)
