= Stardom All Star Grand Queendom =

2023 World Wonder Ring Stardom event

- Promotional poster of the event featuring various wrestlers
- Promotion: World Wonder Ring Stardom
- Date: April 23, 2023
- City: Yokohama, Japan
- Venue: Yokohama Arena
- Attendance: 5,539
- Tagline: Greatest Show In Stardom History

Event chronology
| ← Previous; Cinderella Tournament 2023 | Next → Fukuoka Goddess Legend |

Grand Queendom chronology
| ← Previous; First | Next → 2024 |

Stardom All Star Grand Queendom (スターダム オールスター グランドクイーンダム, Sutādamu ōrusutā gurandokuīndamu) was a professional wrestling event promoted by World Wonder Ring Stardom. The event took place on April 23, 2023, in Yokohama at the Yokohama Arena.

Eleven matches were contested at the event, including two on the pre-show. The main event saw Tam Nakano defeat Giulia to win the World of Stardom Championship. In other prominent matches, Mayu Iwatani defeated Mercedes Moné to win the IWGP Women's Championship, Mina Shirakawa defeated Saya Kamitani to win the Wonder of Stardom Championship, and Maika defeated Himeka in the latter's retirement match.

== Production ==
=== Background ===
On December 29, 2022, during Dream Queendom 2, Stardom announced that on April 23, 2023, at the Yokohama Arena, for the first time, All Star Grand Queendom will take place. The event took place 30 years after All Japan Women's Pro-Wrestling (AJW) All-Star Dream Slam, which is still considered one of the best wrestling events of all time. The event's press conference took place on April 3, 2023, and was broadcast on Stardom's YouTube Channel.

=== Storylines ===
The show featured eleven professional wrestling matches that result from scripted storylines, where wrestlers portray villains, heroes, or less distinguishable characters in the scripted events that build tension and culminate in a wrestling match or series of matches.

On February 10, 2023, Himeka announced her retirement from professional wrestling. She underwent a "retirement road" series of matches ever since and expressed her wish of facing her long time MaiHime tag team partner Maika as her last-ever opponent in a Stardom match.

On February 18, 2023, at New Japan Pro-Wrestling (NJPW)'s Battle in the Valley, Mercedes Moné defeated Kairi to win the IWGP Women's Championship. On April 8, at NJPW's Sakura Genesis, Moné had her first successful title defense after defeating AZM and Hazuki in a three-way match. After the match, Mayu Iwatani challenged Moné for the title at Queendom. Moné accepted Iwatani's challenge, and slapped her across the face afterwards.

On March 8, 2023, Kairi announced that she will take part into the event's card alongside a mystery partner. On April 2, on the third night of the Stardom Cinderella Tournament 2023, it was later revealed that she picked freelancer Saori Anou and Natsupoi as her partners. They named their trio as "REstart" as they challenged Hiragi Kurumi, Risa Sera and Suzu Suzuki for the Artist of Stardom Championship. The following day, Saya Kamitani revealed on Twitter that Saori Anou was in fact one of the two mysterious white-hatted women (one of them already revealed to be Kairi) from before the events of the Stardom World Climax 2022 as her return to Stardom was foreshadowed for more than a year prior.

=== Event ===
Other on-screen personnel
| Role | Name |
|---|---|
| Japanese commentators | Makoto Oe |
| Japanese commentators | Teppei Arita |
| Japanese commentators | Momoe Nakanishi |
| Japanese commentators | Maika |
| English commentators | Chris Charlton |
| English commentators | Sonny Gutierrez |
| English commentators | Mariah May |
| Ring Announcers | Yurie Kozakai |
| Ring Announcers | Yoritaka Ando |
| Referees | Daichi Murayama |
| Referees | Barb Sasaki |
| Referees | Duke Sado |

The first two preshow matches were broadcast on Stardom's YouTube channel. In the first one, Mai Sakurai won the Yokohama Rumble match by last eliminating Super Strong Stardom Giant Machine. In the second one, Ruaka, Momo Watanabe, Natsuko Tora and Saki Kashima picked up a win over Jessie, Mariah May, Xena and Thekla.

In the first main card match, Mei Seira and Starlight Kid picked up a victory over AZM and Mei Suruga. Seira challenged AZM for a High Speed Championship match on further notice. next up, Miyu Amasaki and Utami Hayashishita defeated Hazuki and Fuwa-chan. The fifth match saw the retirement match of Himeka who fell short to her long time tag team partner Maika. The sixth bout saw Ami Sourei and Mirai defeating Nanae Takahashi and Yuu to win the Goddesses of Stardom Championship, ending the latter team's reign at 115 days and two defenses. Sourei became double champion with the Future of Stardom Championship. In the seventh bout, Kairi, Natsupoi and Saori Anou defeated Hiragi Kurumi, Risa Sera and Suzu Suzuki to win the Artist of Stardom Championship. The eighth bout saw Mina Shirakawa defeating Saya Kamitani to win the Wonder of Stardom Championship, ending the latter's reign at 480 days and then-time 15 consecutive defenses record. In the ninth bout, Syuri defeated Chihiro Hashimoto by knockout in a match that could only be won by knockout, count out, submission or referee stoppage.

In the semi main event, Mayu Iwatani defeated Mercedes Moné to become the new IWGP Women's Champion.

In the main event, Tam Nakano defeated Giulia to win the World of Stardom Championship, ending the latter's reign at 115 days and two consecutive defenses.

== Results ==
| No. | Results | Stipulations | Times |
|---|---|---|---|
| 1^{P} | Mai Sakurai won by last eliminating Super Strong Stardom Giant Machine (Note: The other participants were Momoe Nakanishi, Lady C, Yuna Mizumori, Saya Iida, Chanyota, Hanako, Momo Kohgo, Aya Sakura, Ram Kaicho, Hanan, Hina, Koguma, Waka Tsukiyama, Fukigen Death, Rina, Super Strong Stardom Machine and Super Strong Stardom Big Machine.) | Yokohama Rumble match | 26:38 |
| 2^{P} | Oedo Tai (Ruaka and Gold Ship (Momo Watanabe, Natsuko Tora and Saki Kashima)) defeated Club Venus (Jessie, Mariah May and Xena) and Thekla | Eight-woman tag team match | 9:54 |
| 3 | Mei Seira and Starlight Kid defeated AZM and Mei Suruga | Tag team match | 9:49 |
| 4 | Queen's Quest (Miyu Amasaki and Utami Hayashishita) defeated Stars (Hazuki and Fuwa-chan) | Tag team match | 14:19 |
| 5 | Maika defeated Himeka | Singles match This was dubbed as Himeka's last Stardom match. Her actual retirement bout took place on May 14, 2023 at Stardom Jumbo Princess Forever. | 14:17 |
| 6 | The New Eras (Ami Sourei and Mirai) defeated 7Upp (Nanae Takahashi and Yuu) (c) by countout | Tag team match for the Goddesses of Stardom Championship | 12:25 |
| 7 | REstart (Kairi, Natsupoi and Saori Anou) defeated Prominence (Hiragi Kurumi, Risa Sera and Suzu Suzuki) (c) | Six-woman tag team match for the Artist of Stardom Championship | 16:55 |
| 8 | Mina Shirakawa defeated Saya Kamitani (c) | Singles match for the Wonder of Stardom Championship | 17:56 |
| 9 | Syuri defeated Chihiro Hashimoto by knockout | Submission match (Note: Match could only end by submission, knockout or referee stoppage.) | 16:07 |
| 10 | Mayu Iwatani defeated Mercedes Moné (c) | Singles match for the IWGP Women's Championship | 12:56 |
| 11 | Tam Nakano defeated Giulia (c) | Singles match for the World of Stardom Championship | 23:40 |
(c) / – the champion(s) heading into the match; P / – the match was broadcast on the pre-show
