= Stardom New Blood 7 =

2023 World Wonder Ring Stardom event

New Blood 7
- Promotional poster of the event
- Promotion: World Wonder Ring Stardom
- Date: January 20, 2023
- City: Tokyo, Japan
- Venue: Belle Salle Takadanobaba
- Attendance: 307

Event chronology
← Previous; Triangle Derby	Next → Supreme Fight

New Blood chronology
← Previous; New Blood 6	Next → New Blood Premium

Stardom New Blood 7 (スターダムニューブラッド7, Sutādamunyūburaddo 7) was a professional wrestling event promoted by World Wonder Ring Stardom. The event took place on January 20, 2023, in Tokyo, Japan at the Belle Salle Takadanoba, with limited attendance due in part to the ongoing COVID-19 pandemic at the time. The event saw first round matches in a tournament to crown the inaugural New Blood Tag Team Champions

== Production ==
=== Background ===
The "New Blood" is a series of events that mainly focus on matches where rookie wrestlers, usually with three or fewer years of in-ring experience, evolve. Besides wrestlers from Stardom, various superstars from multiple promotions of the Japanese independent scene are invited to compete in bouts that are usually going under the stipulation of singles or tag team matches.

The show featured seven professional wrestling matches that resulted from scripted storylines, where wrestlers portrayed villains, heroes, or less distinguishable characters in the scripted events that built tension and culminated in a wrestling match or series of matches. During the Stardom New Blood 6 event, it was announced that New Blood Tag Team Championship would be introduced, with a tournament to crown the inaugural champions beginning at New Blood 7 on January 20, and concluding at New Blood Premium in Yokohama Budokan on March 25. The event's official press conference was broadcast on Stardom's YouTube channel on January 5, 2023.

=== New Blood Tag Team Championship Inaugural tournament ===
Quarterfinals; New Blood 7 (January 20)
Club Venus (Xia Brookside and Mariah May)	Pin
Oedo Tai (Starlight Kid and Karma)	12:26
Queen's Quest (Hina and Lady C (Note: Miyu Amasaki was initially scheduled to team with Hina but was replaced by Lady C on the day of the event.))	9:05
Mai Sakurai and Chanyota	Pin
God's Eye (Ami Sourei and Nanami)	Pin
Momo Kohgo and Momoka Hanazono	11:53
God's Eye (Mirai and Tomoka Inaba)	Pin
wing★gori (Saya Iida and Hanan)	12:02

Semifinals; New Blood Premium (March 25)
Oedo Tai (Starlight Kid and Karma)	Pin
Mai Sakurai and Chanyota	7:05
God's Eye (Ami Sourei and Nanami)	10:19
God's Eye (Mirai and Tomoka Inaba)	Sub

Finals; New Blood Premium (March 25)
Oedo Tai (Starlight Kid and Karma)	Pin
God's Eye (Mirai and Tomoka Inaba)	13:07

=== Event ===
The entire event was broadcast live on Stardom's YouTube channel. In the first match, Rina picked up a victory over rookie Miran. Next, Ruaka defeated Marika Kobashi. The third bout saw Nanae Takahashi defeating Waka Tsukiyama in a passion-injection match. The next four matches portraited the quarterfinals of the New Blood Tag Team Championship inaugural tournament. First, Ami Sourei and Nanami getting a victory over Momo Kohgo of Stars and freelancer Momoka Hanazono. Next, Donna Del Mondo's Mai Sakurai and Chanyota of P.P.P. Tokyo picked up a victory over Hina and Lady C. Next, Starlight Kid and Ruaka surpassed the team of Xia Brookside and Mariah May. The main event saw Mirai and Tomoka Inaba defeating Saya Iida and Hanan, wrapping up the event and establishing the semifinals of the new championships tournament.

== Results ==
No.	Results	Stipulations	Times
1	Rina defeated Miran	Singles match	7:16
2	Ruaka defeated Marika Kobashi	Singles match	6:34
3	Nanae Takahashi defeated Waka Tsukiyama	Singles match	11:43
4	God's Eye (Ami Sourei and Nanami) defeated Momo Kohgo and Momoka Hanazono	New Blood Tag Team Championship quarterfinals match	11:53
5	Mai Sakurai and Chanyota defeated Queen's Quest (Hina and Lady C)	New Blood Tag Team Championship quarterfinals match	9:05
6	Oedo Tai (Starlight Kid and Karma) defeated Club Venus (Xia Brookside and Mariah May)	New Blood Tag Team Championship quarterfinals match	12:26
7	God's Eye (Mirai and Tomoka Inaba) defeated wing★gori (Saya Iida and Hanan)	New Blood Tag Team Championship quarterfinals match	12:02
