= Nanami (wrestler) =

Japanese professional wrestler

Nanami Hatano
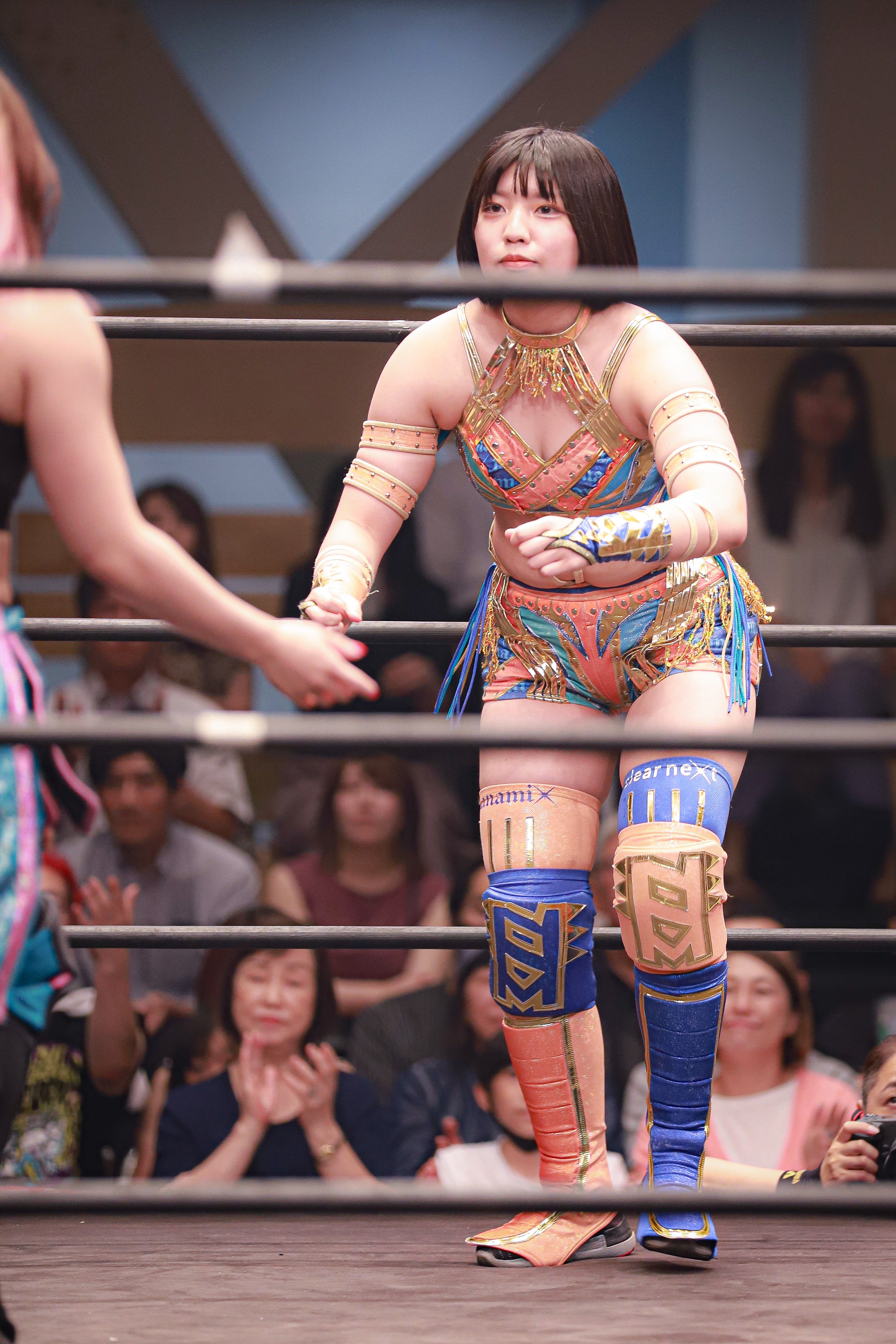
- Nanami in July 2023

Personal information
- Born: August 3, 2006 (age 19) Yokohama, Japan

Professional wrestling career
- Ring name(s): Nanami Hatano; Nanami
- Billed height: 168 cm (5 ft 6 in)
- Billed weight: 60 kg (132 lb)
- Trained by: Sareee
- Debut: 2019

Nanami Hatano (波多野七海, Hatano Nanami; born August 3, 2006) is a Japanese professional wrestler currently signed to the Japanese promotions World Woman Pro-Wrestling Diana. She is also known for her work in World Wonder Ring Stardom, where she is a member of God's Eye.

== Professional wrestling career ==
=== World Woman Pro-Wrestling Diana (2019–present) ===
Nanami made her professional wrestling debut in World Woman Pro-Wrestling Diana at Kaoru Ito's 30th Debut Anniversary event where she fell short to Jaguar Yokota.

=== Independent circuit (2019–present) ===
As part freelancer, Nanami is known for her appearances in various promotions from the Japanese independent scene. At 2AW Ayame Sasamura & Rina Shingaki Produce ~ Butterfly Dance, an event promoted by Active Advance Pro Wrestling on March 14, 2021, Nanami teamed up with Miyuki Takase in a losing effort against Saki and Miku Aono. She also makes sporadic appearances for Sendai Girls' Pro Wrestling. At a house show promoted on January 12, 2020, she competed in a 12-woman battle royal won by Dash Chisako and also involving Ayame Sasamura, Chihiro Hashimoto, Dalys la Caribeña, Kaoru, Manami, Mikoto Shindo, Queen Aminata, Sakura Hirota, Sareee and Yurika Oka. At New Ice Ribbon #1215, an event promoted by Ice Ribbon on July 18, 2022, Nanami unsuccessfully faced Saori Anou.

=== World Wonder Ring Stardom (2022–present) ===
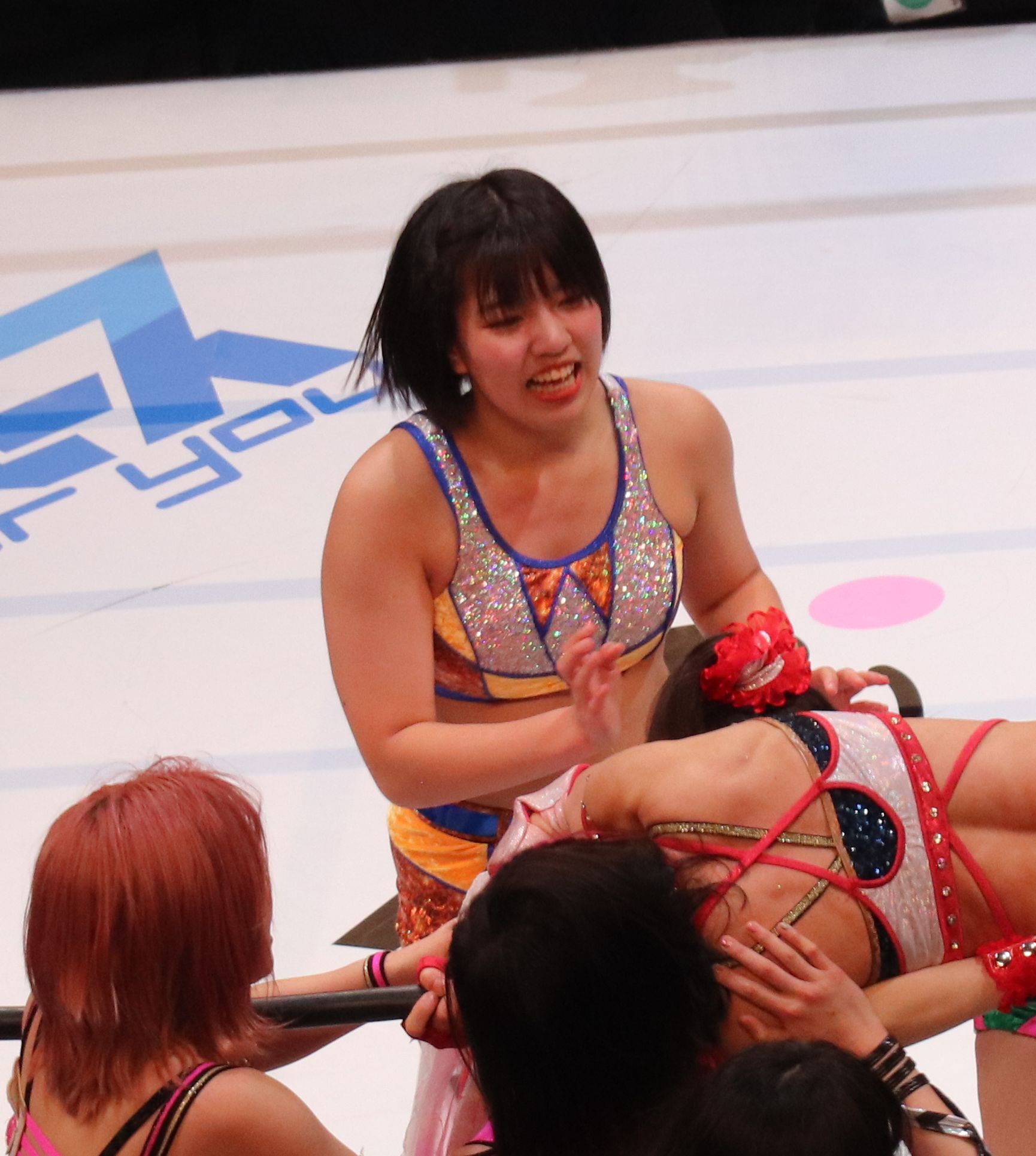
Nanami At the Stardom World Climax 2022 on March 26

Nanami made her first appearance in World Wonder Ring Stardom at New Blood 1 on March 11, 2022, where she teamed up with Haruka Umesaki in a losing effort against Oedo Tai (Starlight Kid and Ruaka). On the second night of the Stardom World Climax from March 27, 2022, she competed in a 18-women Cinderella Rumble match won by Mei Suruga and also involving Unagi Sayaka, Mina Shirakawa, Lady C, Saki Kashima, Ruaka, Saya Iida, Momo Kohgo, Waka Tsukiyama, Rina, Tomoka Inaba, Aoi, Haruka Umesaki, Maria, Ai Houzan, and Yuna Mizumori. At New Blood 3 on July 8, 2022, Nanami fell short to Ami Sourei by submission in a Singles match. At New Blood 5 on October 19, 2022, Nanami teamed up with God's Eye's Tomoka Inaba and Mirai in a losing effort against Oedo Tai (Starlight Kid, Ruaka) and Karma. After the match, Nanami was presented as God's Eye's newest member. At New Blood 6 on December 16, 2022, Nanami teamed up with Mirai and Tomoka Inaba to defeat Stars (Momo Kohgo, Saya Iida and Hanan). At New Blood 7 on January 20, 2023, Nanami is scheduled to team up with stablemate Ami Sourei and battle Momo Kohgo and Momoka Hanazono in the first rounds of the New Blood Tag Team Championship inaugural tournament.

== Championships and accomplishments ==
- Ice Ribbon
  - Triangle Ribbon Championship (2 times)
- Pro Wrestling Illustrated
  - Ranked No. 231 of the top 250 female wrestlers in the PWI Women's 250 in 2024
- World Woman Pro-Wrestling Diana
  - World Woman Pro-Wrestling Diana Tag Team Championship (1 time) – with Rina Amikura
  - World Woman Pro-Wrestling Diana Crystal Championship (1 time, inaugural)
