= Stardom New Blood 6 =

2022 World Wonder Ring Stardom event

New Blood 6
- Promotion: World Wonder Ring Stardom
- Date: December 16, 2022
- City: Tokyo, Japan
- Venue: Shinjuku Sumitomo Hall
- Attendance: 306

Event chronology
| ← Previous; Stardom in Showcase vol.3 | Next → Dream Queendom 2 |

New Blood chronology
| ← Previous; New Blood 5 | Next → New Blood 7 |

Stardom New Blood 6 (スターダムニューブラッド6, Sutādamunyūburaddo 6) was a professional wrestling event promoted by World Wonder Ring Stardom. The event took place on December 16, 2022, in Tokyo, Japan at the Shinjuku Sumitomo Hall, with limited attendance due in part to the ongoing COVID-19 pandemic at the time.

Seven matches were contested at the event. In the main event, Ami Sourei defeated Ruaka to retain the Future of Stardom Championship.

== Production ==
=== Background ===
The "New Blood" is a series of events that mainly focus on matches where rookie wrestlers, usually with three or fewer years of in-ring experience, evolve. Besides wrestlers from Stardom, various superstars from multiple promotions of the Japanese independent scene are invited to compete in bouts that are usually going under the stipulation of singles or tag team matches.

The show featured seven professional wrestling matches that resulted from scripted storylines, where wrestlers portrayed villains, heroes, or less distinguishable characters in the scripted events that built tension and culminated in a wrestling match or series of matches. The event's press conference took place on November 9, 2022, and was broadcast live on Stardom's YouTube channel along with Gold Rush's conference.

=== Event ===
The entire show was broadcast free on Stardom's YouTube Channel. The first match saw Miyu Amasaki defeating Miran. The second bout portrayed Oedo Tai's Rina getting a victory over Best Body Japan Pro-Wrestling's Sanae Takebayashi. Next, God's Eye's Mirai, Tomoka Inaba & Nanami defeated Stars' Momo Kohgo, Saya Iida & Hanan in faction warfare. The fourth match saw Cosmic Angels (Tam Nakano & Waka Tsukiyama) defeated by Rebel X Enemy (Maika Ozaki & Ram Kaicho). Before the next match, it was announced that New Blood Tag Team Championship will be introduced next year, with a tournament to crown the inaugural champions beginning at New Blood 7 on January 20, and concluding at New Blood Premium in Yokohama Budokan on March 25. The fifth match of the night ended with Donna Del Mondo's Thekla & Mai Sakurai defeating Oedo Tai's Starlight Kid & Karma by DQ when Karma threw a fireball at the referee. The sixth match saw Nanae Takahashi defeated Lady C in a Passion Injection Match. After the match, Waka Tsukiyama requested the passion injection.

The show concluded with Ami Sourei and Ruaka for the Future of Stardom Championship. Sourei successfully retained the title in her first defense as champion by defeating Ruaka via Like a Thunderbolt as the result of the main event. After the match, Mai Sakurai was announced as her next challenger for the belt.

== Results ==
| No. | Results | Stipulations | Times |
|---|---|---|---|
| 1 | Miyu Amasaki defeated Miran by pinfall | Singles match | 5:48 |
| 2 | Rina defeated Sanae Takebayashi by pinfall | Singles match | 7:24 |
| 3 | God's Eye (Mirai, Tomoka Inaba and Nanami) defeated Stars (Momo Kohgo, Saya Iida and Hanan) by submission | Six-woman tag team match | 11:17 |
| 4 | Rebel X Enemy (Maika Ozaki and Ram Kaicho) defeated Cosmic Angels (Tam Nakano and Waka Tsukiyama) by submission | Tag team match | 13:23 |
| 5 | Donna Del Mondo (Thekla and Mai Sakurai) defeated Oedo Tai (Starlight Kid and Karma) by disqualification | Tag team match | 13:53 |
| 6 | Nanae Takahashi defeated Lady C by pinfall | Passion injection match | 11:28 |
| 7 | Ami Sourei (c) defeated Ruaka by pinfall | Singles match for the Future of Stardom Championship | 9:07 |
(c) / – the champion(s) heading into the match
