= IWGP Women's Championship =

Wrestling world championship

- The IWGP Women's Championship belt

Details
- Promotion: New Japan Pro-Wrestling (NJPW); World Wonder Ring Stardom
- Date established: July 29, 2022
- Current champion: Syuri
- Date won: October 13, 2025
Statistics
- First champion: Kairi
- Most reigns: Syuri (2 reigns)
- Longest reign: Mayu Iwatani (735 days)
- Shortest reign: Syuri (1st reign, 55 days)
- Oldest champion: Syuri (36 years, 8 months and 5 days)
- Youngest champion: Sareee (29 years, 2 months and 21 days)
- Heaviest champion: Sareee (132 lb (60 kg))
- Lightest champion: Mayu Iwatani (110 lb (50 kg))

The IWGP Women's Championship (Japanese: IWGP女子王座, Hepburn: IWGP Joshi Ōza) is a women's professional wrestling world championship owned by the New Japan Pro-Wrestling promotion. The title is defended on shows promoted by NJPW in Japan, with talent from NJPW's partner promotion World Wonder Ring Stardom featuring as its primary contenders. The inaugural champion was Kairi. The reigning champion is Syuri, who is in her second reign.

== History ==
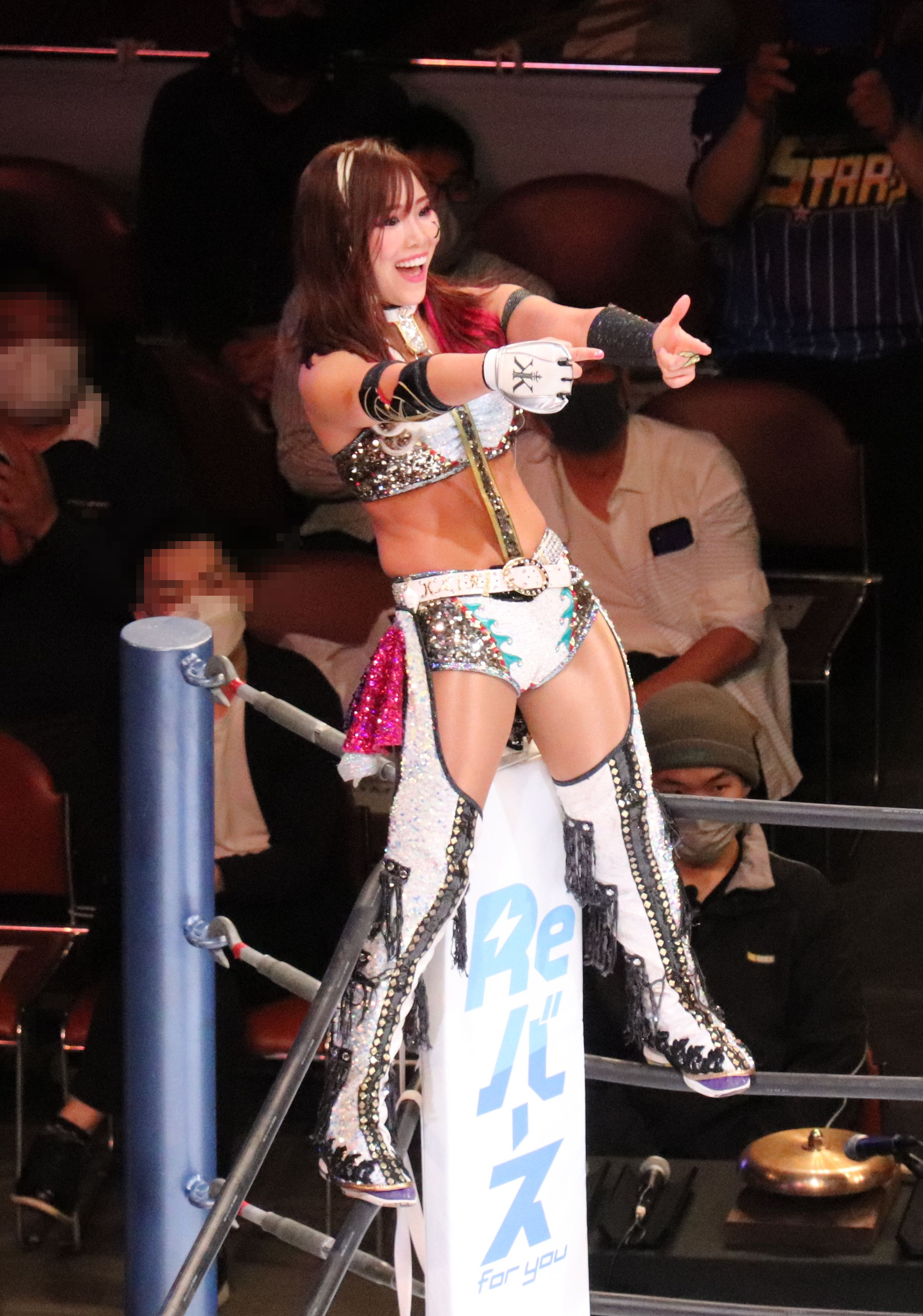
The inaugural IWGP Women's Champion Kairi

Ever since New Japan Pro-Wrestling (NJPW) was founded in 1972, the company had never had a women's championship. On July 29, 2022, it was announced by Takaaki Kidani, owner of World Wonder Ring Stardom and former chairman of NJPW through parent company Bushiroad, that Stardom's roster would compete for NJPW's first-ever women's championship, the IWGP Women's Championship, at the co-promoted event Historic X-Over, set to take place on November 20. The title is promoted as being managed by the IWGP Championship Committee, NJPW's kayfabe governing body.

On August 23 at the press conference for Historic X-Over, the dates and venues for the inaugural tournament were announced. The tournament featured seven wrestlers, with four Stardom wrestlers and three foreign wrestlers participating in the tournament with the finals taking place on November 20. On August 27, four representatives from certain stables of Stardom (referred to by the promotion as "units") were decided to compete in the four available slots. The representatives were Giulia (Donna Del Mondo), Mayu Iwatani (Stars), Starlight Kid (Oedo Tai), and Utami Hayashishita (Queen's Quest). The representatives either picked themselves or appointed another unit member to furtherly compete for the title. On November 20, at Historic X-Over, Kairi became the inaugural champion after defeating Iwatani in the finals. The title was defended for the first time on January 4, 2023, where Kairi retained the title over Tam Nakano during the first night of Wrestle Kingdom 17.

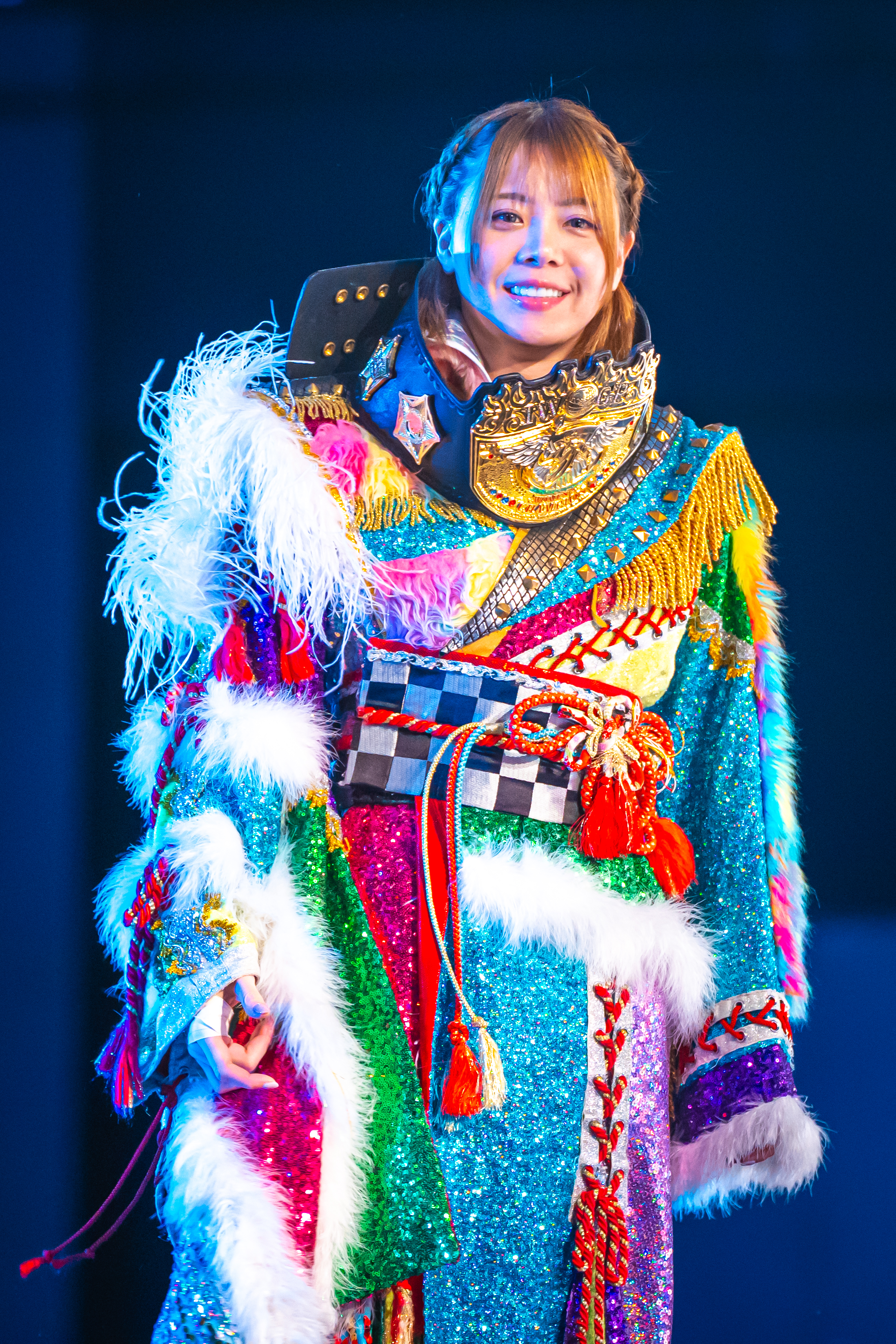
Longest reigning champion Mayu Iwatani at a record-setting 735 days.

=== Inaugural championship tournament (2022) ===
Round 1 Royal Quest II (October 2); IWGP Women's Championship Tournament First Round (October 22)
Mayu Iwatani	Pin
Momo Watanabe	12:32
Utami Hayashishita	Pin
Himeka	11:41
Jazzy Gabert	Pin
Ava White	10:34
Kairi	Bye
–

Semifinals; Goddesses of Stardom Tag League 2022; Night 1 (October 23)
Mayu Iwatani	Pin
Utami Hayashishita	14:51
Jazzy Gabert	12:24
Kairi	Pin

Finals; Historic X-Over (November 20)
Mayu Iwatani	25:28
Kairi	Pin

== Belt design ==
The design of the IWGP Women's Championship belt was inspired by the design of the second-generation IWGP Heavyweight Championship, which was presented to the former champion Shinya Hashimoto during his 489 days reign in 1996.

== Reigns ==
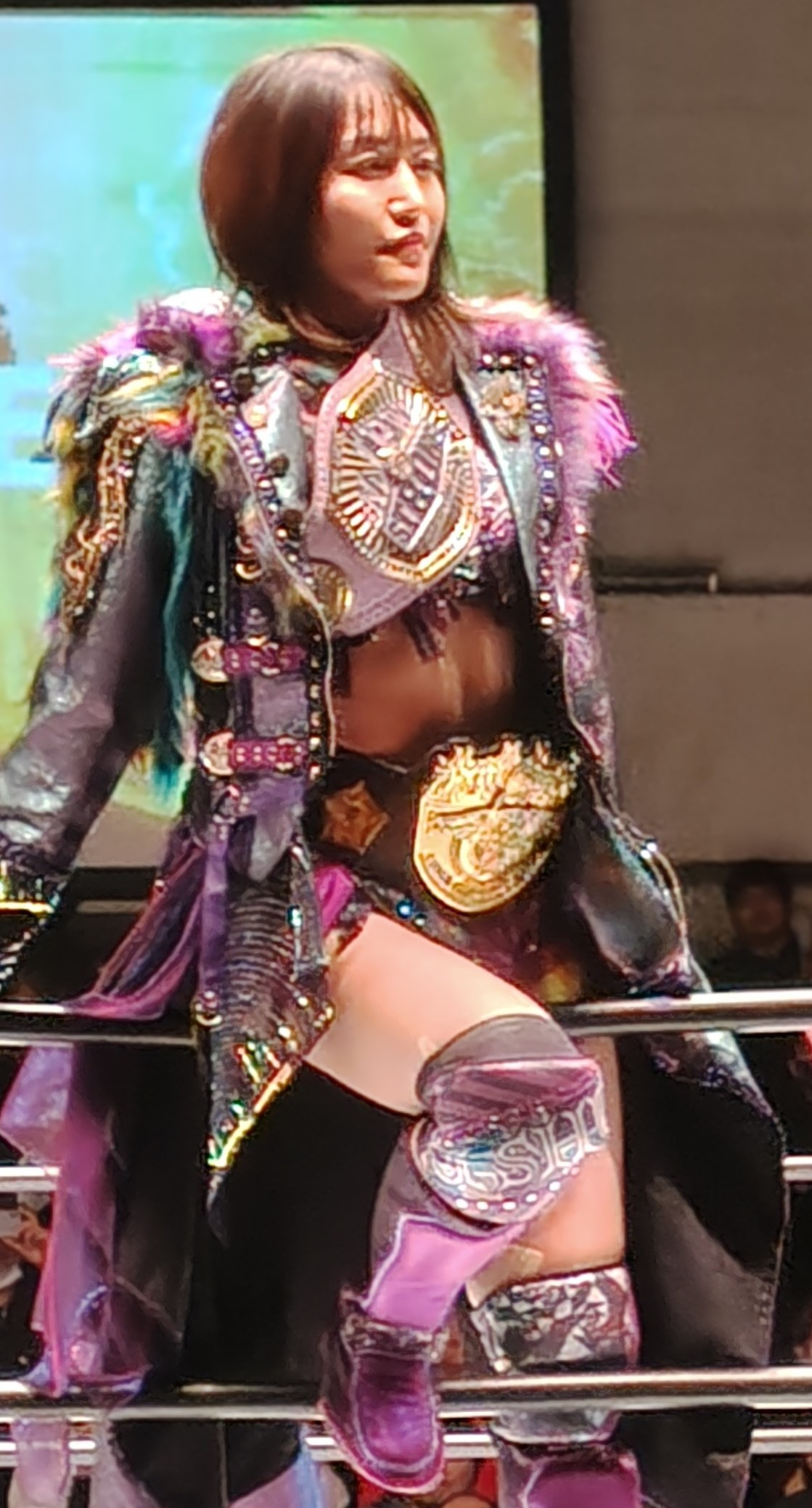
Record-setting two time and current champion, Syuri.

As of November 16, 2026, there have been 6 reigns between 5 champions. Kairi was the inaugural champion. Syuri is the oldest champion at 36 years old, while Sareee is the youngest at 29. Syuri has the most reigns at two. Iwatani's reign is the longest at 735 days, while Syuri's first reign is the shortest at 55 days.

Syuri is the reigning champion in her second reign. She won the title by defeating Sareee at King of Pro-Wrestling on October 13, 2025.

Key
No.	Overall reign number
Reign	Reign number for the specific champion
Days	Number of days held
Defenses	Number of successful defenses
+	Current reign is changing daily

No.	Champion	Championship change			Reign statistics			Notes	Ref.
No.	Champion	Date	Event	Location	Reign	Days	Defenses	Notes	Ref.
New Japan Pro-Wrestling (NJPW) and World Wonder Ring Stardom (ST★RDOM)
1	Kairi	November 20, 2022	Historic X-Over	Tokyo, Japan	1	90	1	Defeated Mayu Iwatani in the finals of a seven-woman single-elimination tournament to become the inaugural champion.	
2	Mercedes Moné	February 18, 2023	Battle in the Valley	San Jose, CA	1	64	1		
3	Mayu Iwatani	April 23, 2023	All Star Grand Queendom	Yokohama, Japan	1	735	9		
4	Syuri	April 27, 2025	All Star Grand Queendom	Yokohama, Japan	1	55	1		
5	Sareee	June 21, 2025	The Conversion	Tokyo, Japan	1	114	3		
6	Syuri	October 13, 2025	King of Pro-Wrestling	Tokyo, Japan	2	399+	6		

== Combined reigns ==
As of November 16, 2026.

†	Indicates the current champion

Rank	Wrestler	No. of reigns	Combined defenses	Combined days
1	Mayu Iwatani	1	9	735
2	Syuri †	2	7	454+
3	Sareee	1	3	114
4	Kairi	1	1	90
5	Mercedes Moné	1	1	64

== See also ==
- GHC Women's Championship
- Women's World Championship
- World of Stardom Championship
