= Triangle Derby I =

2023 World Wonder Ring Stardom event

- Official poster for the January 3 event featuring Mayu Iwatani, Utami Hayashishita, Starlight Kid, Giulia, Tam Nakano, and Syuri.
- Promotion: World Wonder Ring Stardom
- Date: January 3 – March 4, 2023
- City: Various; Finals: Tokyo, Japan
- Venue: Finals: Yoyogi National Gymnasium
- Attendance: Highest: Finals (1,919)

Event chronology
← Previous; Dream Queendom 2	Next → New Blood 7

Triangle Derby chronology
← Previous; First	Next → 2024

Triangle Derby I was the first annual round-robin six-woman tag team tournament event promoted by World Wonder Ring Stardom under the "Triangle Derby" branch. The event took place between January 3 and March 4, 2023, with limited attendance due in part to the ongoing COVID-19 pandemic at the time (until January 30). It also represented the first major event promoted by Stardom in 2023.

== Tournament history ==
The Triangle Derby is a professional wrestling tournament held annually by Stardom. It is currently disputed as a round-robin tournament with teams of three wrestlers split into two pools. Contrary to most round-robin style tournaments, teams from the same pool don't face each other. Instead, each team faces all teams from the opposite pool. Matches are fought with a 15-minute time limit. A win is worth two points and a draw is worth one point. The top two teams from each pool will advance to a final single-elimination bracket, consisting of semifinals and finals.

=== Storylines ===
The tournament featured professional wrestling matches that resulted from scripted storylines, where wrestlers portrayed villains, heroes, or less distinguishable characters in the scripted events that built tension and culminated in a wrestling match or series of matches. The event's official press conference took place on December 16, 2022, and was broadcast live on Stardom's YouTube channel.

== Participants ==
This is a list of participants including the champions during the event. The tournament featured fourteen teams formed by a total of forty-two wrestlers, divided into two distinctive blocks with the two highest placed teams of their respective blocks moving on to the semifinals.

*Noted underneath were the champions who held their titles at the time of the tournament.

Wrestler	Unit	Notes
AZM	Queen's Quest	High Speed Champion
Ami Sourei	God's Eye	Future of Stardom Champion
Giulia	Donna Del Mondo	World of Stardom Champion
Hanan	Stars	
Haruka Umesaki	Oedo Tai	Freelancer
Hazuki	Stars	
Himeka	Donna Del Mondo	
Hiragi Kurumi	Prominence	Artist of Stardom Champion; Winner
Koguma	Stars	
Lady C	Queen's Quest	
Mai Sakurai	Donna Del Mondo	
Maika	Donna Del Mondo	
Maika Ozaki	Rebel X Enemy	Freelancer
Mariah May	Cosmic Angels/Club Venus	One of the mystery trio participants
Maya Yukihi	Rebel X Enemy	Freelancer
Mayu Iwatani	Stars	
Mina Shirakawa	Cosmic Angels	One of the mystery trio participants
Mirai	God's Eye	
Momo Watanabe	Oedo Tai	
Nanae Takahashi	Neo Stardom Army	Freelancer
Natsuko Tora	Oedo Tai	
Natsupoi	Cosmic Angels	Goddesses of Stardom Champion
Ram Kaicho	Rebel X Enemy	Freelancer
Rina Amikura	Cosmic Angels/Color's	Freelancer
Risa Sera	Prominence	Artist of Stardom Champion; Winner
Ruaka	Oedo Tai	
Saki	Cosmic Angels/Color's	
Saki Kashima	Oedo Tai	
Saya Kamitani	Queen's Quest	Wonder of Stardom Champion
Saya Iida	Stars	
Starlight Kid	Oedo Tai	
Suzu Suzuki	Prominence	Artist of Stardom Champion; Winner
Syuri	God's Eye	
Tam Nakano	Cosmic Angels	Goddesses of Stardom Champion
Thekla	Donna Del Mondo	
Utami Hayashishita	Queen's Quest	
Waka Tsukiyama	Cosmic Angels	
Xia Brookside	Cosmic Angels/Club Venus	One of the mystery trio participants
Yuko Sakurai	Cosmic Angels/Color's	Freelancer
Yuna Mizumori	Neo Stardom Army	Freelancer
Yuu	Neo Stardom Army	Freelancer

== Results ==
Night 1 (January 3)
No.	Results	Stipulations	Times
1	Rina defeated Hina and Miyu Amasaki	Three-way match	6:21
2	Club Venus (Mina Shirakawa, Xia Brookside and Mariah May) defeated Lollipop (Waka Tsukiyama, Yuko Sakurai and Rina Amikura)	Triangle Derby group stage match	9:02
3	Prominence (Suzu Suzuki, Risa Sera and Hiragi Kurumi) defeated Unique Glare (Starlight Kid, Haruka Umesaki and Ruaka)	Triangle Derby group stage match	6:06
4	Gold Ship (Natsuko Tora, Momo Watanabe and Saki Kashima) defeated H&M's (Mayu Iwatani, Hanan and Momo Kohgo)	Triangle Derby group stage match	9:29
5	MaiHime with C (Maika, Himeka and Lady C) defeated Cosmic Angels (meltear (Tam Nakano and Natsupoi) and Saki)	Triangle Derby group stage match	11:20
6	Neo Stardom Army (7Upp (Nanae Takahashi & Yuu) and Yuna Mizumori) defeated Classmates (Hazuki, Koguma and Saya Iida)	Triangle Derby group stage match	8:50
7	Abarenbo GE (Syuri, Mirai and Ami Sourei) vs. Queen's Quest (AphrOditE (Utami Hayashishita and Saya Kamitani) and AZM) ended in a time-limit draw	Triangle Derby group stage match	15:00
8	Rebel&Enemy (Ram Kaicho, Maika Ozaki and Maya Yukihi) defeated Baribari Bombers (Giulia, Thekla and Mai Sakurai)	Triangle Derby group stage match	14:38

Night 2 (January 6)
No.	Results	Stipulations	Times
1	Rina Amikura defeated Waka Tsukiyama	Singles match	5:40
2	Yuu and Yuna Mizumori defeated Maika and Lady C	Tag team match	9:54
3	Classmates (Hazuki, Koguma and Saya Iida) defeated H&M's (Mayu Iwatani, Hanan and Momo Kohgo)	Triangle Derby group stage match	9:11
4	Queen's Quest (AphrOditE (Utami Hayashishita and Saya Kamitani) and 02line (AZM and Miyu Amasaki)) defeated Oedo Tai (Natsuko Tora, Saki Kashima, Rina and Ruaka)	Eight-woman tag team match	12:01
5	Baribari Bombers (Giulia, Thekla and Mai Sakurai) defeated Rebel&Enemy (Ram Kaicho, Maika Ozaki and Maya Yukihi) and Cosmic Angels (Yuko Sakurai, Natsupoi and Saki)	Three-way tag team match	12:34
6	Abarenbo GE (Syuri, Mirai and Ami Sourei) defeated Club Venus (Mina Shirakawa, Xia Brookside and Mariah May)	Triangle Derby group stage match	13:36

Night 3 (January 8)
No.	Results	Stipulations	Times
1	Super Strong Stardom Machine won by last eliminating AZM (Note: The other participants were Hazuki, Koguma, Momo Kohgo, Lady C, Miyu Amasaki, Ruaka, Mirai and Yuna Mizumori.)	Nagoya Rumble match	11:00
2	Club Venus (Mina Shirakawa, Xia Brookside and Mariah May) defeated Oedo Tai (Natsuko Tora, Saki Kashima and Rina)	Six-woman tag team match	11:01
3	Baribari Bombers (Giulia, Thekla and Mai Sakurai) defeated Lollipop (Waka Tsukiyama, Yuko Sakurai and Rina Amikura)	Triangle Derby group stage match	9:05
4	Prominence (Suzu Suzuki, Risa Sera and Hiragi Kurumi) defeated Cosmic Angels (meltear (Tam Nakano and Natsupoi) and Saki)	Triangle Derby group stage match	13:25
5	Syuri and Mayu Iwatani vs. Utami Hayashishita and Maika ended in a time-limit draw	Tag team shuffle match	30:00
6	Saya Kamitani (c) defeated Ami Sourei	Singles match for the Wonder of Stardom Championship	18:06
(c) / – the champion(s) heading into the match

Night 4 (January 9)
No.	Results	Stipulations	Times
1	Thekla defeated Momo Kohgo	Singles match	7:20
2	Syuri defeated Yuna Mizumori	Singles match	9:17
3	Club Venus (Mina Shirakawa, Xia Brookside and Mariah May) defeated MaiHime with C (Maika, Himeka and Lady C)	Six-woman tag team match	11:41
4	Stars (Mayu Iwatani, Hazuki, Koguma and Saya Iida) defeated Oedo Tai (Natsuko Tora, Saki Kashima, Rina and Ruaka)	Eight-woman tag team match	13:03
5	AphrOditE (Utami Hayashishita and Saya Kamitani) vs. God's Eye (Mirai and Ami Sourei) ended in a time-limit draw	Tag team match	15:00
6	Cosmic Angels (meltear (Tam Nakano and Natsupoi) and Saki) defeated Lollipop (Waka Tsukiyama, Yuko Sakurai and Rina Amikura)	Triangle Derby group stage match	14:58

Night 5 (January 14)
No.	Results	Stipulations	Times
1	Stars (Mayu Iwatani and Momo Kohgo) defeated Miyu Amasaki and Waka Tsukiyama	Tag team match	8:51
2	Unique Glare (Starlight Kid, Haruka Umesaki and Ruaka) defeated MaiHime with C (Maika, Himeka and Lady C)	Triangle Derby group stage match	9:12
3	Club Venus (Mina Shirakawa, Xia Brookside and Mariah May) defeated Classmates (Hazuki, Koguma and Saya Iida)	Triangle Derby group stage match	10:03
4	Neo Stardom Army (7Upp (Nanae Takahashi & Yuu) and Yuna Mizumori) defeated Prominence (Suzu Suzuki, Risa Sera and Hiragi Kurumi)	Triangle Derby group stage match	13:21
5	Gold Ship (Natsuko Tora, Momo Watanabe and Saki Kashima) defeated Queen's Quest (AphrOditE (Utami Hayashishita and Saya Kamitani) and AZM)	Triangle Derby group stage match	11:06
6	Abarenbo GE (Syuri, Mirai and Ami Sourei) defeated Baribari Bombers (Giulia, Thekla and Mai Sakurai)	Triangle Derby group stage match	13:47
7	Cosmic Angels (meltear (Tam Nakano and Natsupoi) and Saki) defeated Rebel&Enemy (Ram Kaicho, Maika Ozaki and Maya Yukihi)	Triangle Derby group stage match	11:55

Night 6 (January 15)
No.	Results	Stipulations	Times
1	Koguma defeated Yuna Mizumori and Mirai	Three-way match	7:40
2	meltear defeated Stars (Hazuki and Saya Iida) and God's Eye (Syuri and Ami Sourei)	Three-way tag team match	10:53
3	Queen's Quest (AphrOditE (Utami Hayashishita and Saya Kamitani) and AZM) defeated Lollipop (Waka Tsukiyama, Yuko Sakurai and Rina Amikura)	Triangle Derby group stage match	11:39
4	Unique Glare (Starlight Kid, Haruka Umesaki and Ruaka) defeated Rebel&Enemy (Ram Kaicho, Maika Ozaki and Maya Yukihi)	Triangle Derby group stage match	10:55
5	MaiHime with C (Maika, Himeka and Lady C) defeated H&M's (Mayu Iwatani, Hanan and Momo Kohgo)	Triangle Derby group stage match	11:34
6	Prominence (Suzu Suzuki, Risa Sera and Hiragi Kurumi) defeated Club Venus (Mina Shirakawa, Xia Brookside and Mariah May)	Triangle Derby group stage match	11:47
7	Gold Ship (Natsuko Tora, Momo Watanabe and Saki Kashima) defeated Baribari Bombers (Giulia, Thekla and Mai Sakurai)	Triangle Derby group stage match	12:25

Night 7 - Stardom 2022 Awards (January 21)
No.	Results	Stipulations	Times
1	Ami Sourei (c) defeated Mai Sakurai	Singles match for the Future of Stardom Championship	10:38
2	God's Eye (Syuri, Mirai and Tomoka Inaba) defeated Oedo Tai (Starlight Kid, Ruaka and Rina)	Six-woman tag team match	9:10
3	Queen's Quest (AphrOditE (Utami Hayashishita and Saya Kamitani) and AZM) defeated MaiHime with C (Maika, Himeka and Lady C)	Triangle Derby group stage match	12:10
4	Rebel&Enemy (Ram Kaicho, Maika Ozaki and Maya Yukihi) defeated Club Venus (Mina Shirakawa, Xia Brookside and Mariah May)	Triangle Derby group stage match	13:39
5	Prominence (Suzu Suzuki, Risa Sera and Hiragi Kurumi) defeated H&M's (Mayu Iwatani, Hanan and Momo Kohgo)	Triangle Derby group stage match	12:24
6	Neo Stardom Army (7Upp (Nanae Takahashi & Yuu) and Yuna Mizumori) defeated Oedo Tai (Natsuko Tora, Momo Watanabe and Saki Kashima)	Triangle Derby group stage match	12:10
7	Giulia vs. Super Strong Stardom Machine, Koguma, Thekla, Hina, Hazuki, Tam Nakano, Saki, Natsupoi, Saya Iida and Waka Tsukiyama ended in a time-limit draw	Ten-seat gauntlet match (Note: Giulia went into three minute time-limit draws against each competitor.)	30:00
(c) / – the champion(s) heading into the match

Night 8 (January 28)
No.	Results	Stipulations	Times
1	Hina defeated Rina and Tomoka Inaba	Three-way match	6:24
2	H&M's (Mayu Iwatani, Hanan and Momo Kohgo) defeated Cosmic Angels (Tam Nakano, Natsupoi and Waka Tsukiyama)	Six-woman tag team match	12:25
3	Baribari Bombers (Giulia, Thekla and Mai Sakurai) defeated Classmates (Hazuki, Koguma and Saya Iida)	Triangle Derby group stage match	12:37
4	Club Venus (Mina Shirakawa, Xia Brookside and Mariah May) defeated Gold Ship (Natsuko Tora, Momo Watanabe and Saki Kashima)	Triangle Derby group stage match	11:30
5	Abarenbo GE (Syuri, Mirai and Ami Sourei) defeated Unique Glare (Starlight Kid, Haruka Umesaki and Ruaka)	Triangle Derby group stage match	12:06
6	Neo Stardom Army (7Upp (Nanae Takahashi & Yuu) and Yuna Mizumori) defeated MaiHime with C (Maika, Himeka and Lady C)	Triangle Derby group stage match	11:56
7	Queen's Quest (AphrOditE (Utami Hayashishita and Saya Kamitani) and AZM) defeated Prominence (Suzu Suzuki, Risa Sera and Hiragi Kurumi)	Triangle Derby group stage match	13:18

Night 9 (January 29)
No.	Results	Stipulations	Times
1	AZM defeated Tomoka Inaba and Waka Tsukiyama	Three-way match	7:27
2	Queen's Quest (AphrOditE (Utami Hayashishita and Saya Kamitani) and Hina) defeated Oedo Tai (Momo Watanabe, Starlight Kid and Rina)	Six-woman tag team match	11:18
3	Baribari Bombers (Giulia, Thekla and Mai Sakurai) defeated Oedo Tai (Natsuko Tora, Saki Kashima and Ruaka)	Six-woman tag team match	9:38
4	Cosmic Angels (meltear (Tam Nakano and Natsupoi) and Saki) defeated Classmates (Hazuki, Koguma and Saya Iida)	Triangle Derby group stage match	11:42
5	Abarenbo GE (Syuri, Mirai and Ami Sourei) defeated H&M's (Mayu Iwatani, Hanan and Momo Kohgo)	Triangle Derby group stage match	11:17
6	Rebel&Enemy (Ram Kaicho, Maika Ozaki and Maya Yukihi) defeated Neo Stardom Army (7Upp (Nanae Takahashi & Yuu) and Yuna Mizumori)	Triangle Derby group stage match	13:11
7	Club Venus (Mina Shirakawa, Xia Brookside and Mariah May) defeated MaiHime with C (Maika, Himeka and Lady C)	Triangle Derby group stage match	12:33

Stardom Supreme Fight 2023 (February 4)
No.	Results	Stipulations	Times
1	Classmates (Hazuki, Saya Iida and Koguma) defeated Unique Glare (Starlight Kid, Karma and Ruaka)	Triangle Derby group stage match	9:03

Night 10 (February 11)
No.	Results	Stipulations	Times
1	Oedo Tai (Starlight Kid and Ruaka defeated Club Venus (Mina Shirakawa and Mariah May), Queen's Quest (Lady C and Miyu Amasaki) and Donna Del Mondo (Mai Sakurai and Thekla)	Four-way tag team match	10:39
2	Donna Del Mondo (Giulia, Maika and Himeka defeated Classmates Hazuki, Koguma and Saya Iida)	Six-woman tag team match	10:10
3	H&M's (Mayu Iwatani, Hanan and Momo Kohgo) defeated Lollipop (Waka Tsukiyama, Yuko Sakurai and Rina Amikura)	Triangle Derby group stage match	11:15
4	Cosmic Angels (meltear (Tam Nakano and Natsupoi) and Saki) defeated Gold Ship (Natsuko Tora, Momo Watanabe and Saki Kashima)	Triangle Derby group stage match	9:29
5	Abarenbo GE (Syuri, Mirai and Ami Sourei) vs. (7Upp (Nanae Takahashi & Yuu) and Yuna Mizumori) ended in a time-limit draw	Triangle Derby group stage match	15:00
6	Queen's Quest (AphrOditE (Utami Hayashishita and Saya Kamitani) and AZM) defeated Rebel&Enemy (Ram Kaicho, Maika Ozaki and Maya Yukihi)	Triangle Derby group stage match	13:41

Night 11 (February 12)
No.	Results	Stipulations	Times
1	Cosmic Angels (Natsupoi and Club Venus (Mina Shirakawa and Mariah May) defeated Stars (Koguma, Momo Kohgo and Hanan)	Six-woman tag team match	8:22
2	Tam Nakano vs. Saya Kamitani vs. Yuna Mizumori ended in a time-limit draw	Three-way match	15:00
3	Oedo Tai (Natsuko Tora, Saki Kashima and Momo Watanabe) defeated Stars (Mayu Iwatani, Hazuki and Saya Iida)	Six-woman tag team match	10:10
4	Abarenbo GE (Syuri, Mirai and Ami Sourei) defeated Queen's Quest (Utami Hayashishita, AZM and Miyu Amasaki)	Six-woman tag team match	14:00
5	Unique Glare (Starlight Kid, Haruka Umesaki and Ruaka) defeated Lollipop (Waka Tsukiyama, Yuko Sakurai and Rina Amikura)	Triangle Derby group stage match	12:36
6	Baribari Bombers (Giulia, Thekla and Mai Sakurai) defeated MaiHime with C (Maika, Himeka and Lady C)	Triangle Derby group stage match	11:50

Night 12 (February 17)
No.	Results	Stipulations	Times
1	MaiHime (Maika and Himeka) defeated Club Venus (Mina Shirakawa and Mariah May), Queen's Quest (Miyu Amasaki and Lady C) and Oedo Tai (Fukigen Death and Rina)	Four-way tag team match	8:05
2	Gold Ship (Natsuko Tora, Momo Watanabe and Saki Kashima) defeated Unique Glare (Starlight Kid, Haruka Umesaki and Ruaka)	Triangle Derby group stage match	9:41
3	Neo Stardom Army (7Upp (Nanae Takahashi & Yuu) and Yuna Mizumori) defeated Lollipop (Waka Tsukiyama, Yuko Sakurai and Rina Amikura)	Triangle Derby group stage match	13:01
4	Classmates Hazuki, Koguma and Saya Iida) defeated Queen's Quest (AphrOditE (Utami Hayashishita and Saya Kamitani) and AZM)	Triangle Derby group stage match	10:17
5	Rebel&Enemy (Ram Kaicho, Maika Ozaki and Maya Yukihi) defeated H&M's (Mayu Iwatani, Hanan and Momo Kohgo)	Triangle Derby group stage match	10:30
6	Cosmic Angels (meltear (Tam Nakano and Natsupoi) and Saki) defeated Abarenbo GE (Syuri, Mirai and Ami Sourei)	Triangle Derby group stage match	12:44
7	Prominence (Suzu Suzuki, Risa Sera and Hiragi Kurumi) defeated Baribari Bombers (Giulia, Thekla and Mai Sakurai)	Triangle Derby group stage match	13:48

== Finals ==
Triangle Derby Finals
- Promotional poster of the event finals featuring various wrestlers
- Promotion: World Wonder Ring Stardom
- Date: March 4, 2023
- City: Tokyo, Japan
- Venue: Yoyogi National Gymnasium
- Attendance: 1,919

Event chronology
← Previous; Stardom in Showcase vol.4	Next → New Blood Premium

=== Event ===
The finals night took place on March 4, 2023. First three pre-show bouts were broadcast live on Stardom's YouTube channel. In the first of them, Rina picked up a victory over Queen's Quest's stablemates Miyu Amasaki and Hina in a three-way match. Next up, Utami Hayashishita and Lady C defeated Ram Kaicho and Maika Ozaki in tag team action. Next up, Maika, Thekla and Mai Sakurai picked up a victory over Mina Shirakawa, Mariah May and Waka Tsukiyama. The first main card bout saw Oedo Tai's Natsuko Tora, Momo Watanabe, Saki Kashima, Ruaka and Fukigen Death outmatching Stars members Mayu Iwatani, Koguma, Momo Kohgo, Hanan and Saya Iida in a Ten-woman tag team match. The fifth match of the night saw Syuri, Mirai and Ami Sourei outlasting Tam Nakano and Natsupoi and Saki in the Triangle Derby's first semifinal. Next up, Prominence (Suzu Suzuki, Risa Sera and Hiragi Kurumi) defeated Neo Stardom Army's Nanae Takahashi, Yuu and Yuna Mizumori in the other semifinal. After the bout concluded, Suzuki announced they put their Artist of Stardom Championship on the line against Syuri, Mirai and Sourei in the Triangle finals. In the seventh bout, Chihiro Hashimoto defeated Himeka by submission in one of the latter's last matches before retirement. After the bout concluded, Hashimoto finally challenged Syuri to a match at All Star Grand Queendom on April 23, 2023. In the eighth bout, Saya Kamitani secured the fifteenth consecutive defense of the Wonder of Stardom Championship against Hazuki. She nominated Mina Shirakawa as her next opponent for All Star Dream Queendom on April 23. Next up, AZM defeated Starlight Kid to secure the tenth consecutive defense of the High Speed Championship, setting a record at the time. In the semi main event, Giulia drew with Maya Yukihi for the World of Stardom Championship as a result of a double count-out after they brought the fight outside the ring. After the bout concluded, Giulia received a title challenge from Tam Nakano for All Star Grand Queendom on April 23, 2023.

In the main event, Suzu Suzuki, Risa Sera and Hiragi Kurumi defeated Syuri, Mirai and Ami Sourei to win the first edition of the Triangle Derby as well as retaining the Artist of Stardom Championship for the first time in that respective reign.

=== Results ===
No.	Results	Stipulations	Times
1^{P}	Rina defeated Hina and Miyu Amasaki	Three-way match	5:53
2^{P}	Queen's Quest (Lady C and Utami Hayashishita) defeated Rebel and Enemy (Maika Ozaki and Ram Kaicho)	Tag team match	7:25
3^{P}	Donna Del Mondo (Mai Sakurai, Maika, Thekla) defeated Club Venus (Mariah May and Mina Shirakawa) and Waka Tsukiyama	Six-woman tag team match	10:20
4	Oedo Tai (Fukigen Death, Momo Watanabe, Natsuko Tora, Ruaka and Saki Kashima) defeated Stars (Hanan, Koguma, Mayu Iwatani, Momo Kohgo, and Saya Iida)	Ten-woman tag team match	8:20
5	Abarenbo GE (Ami Sourei, Mirai and Syuri) defeated Cosmic Angels (meltear (Natsupoi and Tam Nakano) and Saki)	Triangle Derby semifinal match	11:30
6	Prominence (Hiragi Kurumi, Risa Sera and Suzu Suzuki) defeated (Neo Stardom Army (7Upp (Nanae Takahashi and Yuu) and Yuna Mizumori)	Triangle Derby semifinal match	10:31
7	Chihiro Hashimoto defeated Himeka by submission (Note: Himeka announced her retirement from professional wrestling on February 10, 2023. She expressed her wish of facing Hashimoto in singles competition as one of her last bouts before retiring.)	Singles match	8:52
8	Saya Kamitani (c) defeated Hazuki	Singles match for the Wonder of Stardom Championship	22:48
9	AZM (c) defeated Starlight Kid	Singles match for the High Speed Championship	17:05
10	Giulia (c) vs. Maya Yukihi ended in a double count-out	Singles match for the World of Stardom Championship	17:57
11	Prominence (Hiragi Kurumi, Risa Sera and Suzu Suzuki) (c) defeated Abarenbo GE (Ami Sourei, Mirai and Syuri)	Triangle Derby finals for the Artist of Stardom Championship	14:47
(c) / – the champion(s) heading into the match; P / – the match was broadcast on the pre-show

== Blocks ==
Stardom announced the official participants of the two blocks "Triangle Red" and "Triangle Blue" on December 16, 2022.

Final standings
Triangle Red		Triangle Blue	
Neo Stardom Army (7Upp (Nanae Takahashi and Yuu) and Yuna Mizumori)	11	Abarenbo GE (Syuri, Mirai and Ami Sourei)	10
Cosmic Angels (Tam Nakano, Natsupoi and Saki)	10	Prominence (Suzu Suzuki, Risa Sera and Hiragi Kurumi)	10
Queen's Quest (AphrOditE (Utami Hayashishita and Saya Kamitani) and AZM)	9	Gold Ship (Natsuko Tora, Momo Watanabe and Saki Kashima)	8
Club Venus (Mina Shirakawa, Xia Brookside and Mariah May) (Note: Shirakawa, Brookside and May were announced as the mystery trio following the events from Stardom Dream Queendom 2 of December 29, 2022.)	8	Rebel&Enemy (Ram Kaicho, Maika Ozaki and Maya Yukihi)	8
Unique Glare (Starlight Kid, Haruka Umesaki and Ruaka)	6	MaiHime with C (Maika, Himeka and Lady C)	4
Baribari Bombers (Giulia, Thekla and Mai Sakurai)	6	Classmates (Hazuki, Koguma and Saya Iida)	6
H&M's (Mayu Iwatani, Hanan and Momo Kohgo)	2	Lollipop (Waka Tsukiyama, Yuko Sakurai and Rina Amikura)	0

Blue Red	Kaicho Ozaki Yukihi	Tsukiyama Sakurai Amikura	Hazuki Koguma Iida	Maika Himeka Lady C	Syuri Mirai Sourei	Suzuki Sera Kurumi	Tora Watanabe Kashima
Iwatani Hanan Kohgo	Kaicho; Ozaki; Yukihi (10:30)	Iwatani; Hanan; Kohgo (11:15)	Hazuki; Koguma; Iida (9:11)	Maika; Himeka; Lady C (11:34)	Syuri; Mirai; Sourei (11:17)	Suzuki; Sera; Kurumi (12:24)	Tora; Watanabe; Kashima (9:29)
Kid Umesaki Ruaka	Kid; Umesaki; Ruaka (10:55)	Kid; Umesaki; Ruaka (12:36)	Hazuki; Koguma; Iida (9:03)	Kid; Umesaki; Ruaka (9:12)	Syuri; Mirai; Sourei (12:06)	Suzuki; Sera; Kurumi (6:06)	Tora; Watanabe; Kashima (9:41)
Giulia Thekla Sakurai	Kaicho; Ozaki; Yukihi (14:38)	Giulia; Thekla; Sakurai (9:05)	Giulia; Thekla; Sakurai (12:37)	Giulia; Thekla; Sakurai (11:50)	Syuri; Mirai; Sourei (13:47)	Suzuki; Sera; Kurumi (13:48)	Tora; Watanabe; Kashima (12:25)
Hayashishita Kamitani AZM	Hayashishita; Kamitani; AZM (13:41)	Hayashishita; Kamitani; AZM (11:39)	Hazuki; Koguma; Iida (10:17)	Hayashishita; Kamitani; AZM (12:10)	Draw (15:00)	Hayashishita; Kamitani; AZM (13:18)	Tora; Watanabe; Kashima (11:06)
Nakano Natsupoi Saki	Nakano; Natsupoi; Saki (11:55)	Nakano; Natsupoi; Saki (14:58)	Nakano; Natsupoi; Saki (11:42)	Maika; Himeka; Lady C (11:20)	Nakano; Natsupoi; Saki (12:44)	Suzuki; Sera; Kurumi (13:25)	Nakano; Natsupoi; Saki (9:29)
Takahashi Yuu Mizumori	Kaicho; Ozaki; Yukihi (13:11)	Takahashi; Yuu; Mizumori (13:01)	Takahashi; Yuu; Mizumori (8:50)	Takahashi; Yuu; Mizumori (11:56)	Draw (15:00)	Takahashi; Yuu; Mizumori (13:21)	Takahashi; Yuu; Mizumori (12:10)
Shirakawa Brookside May	Kaicho; Ozaki; Yukihi (13:39)	Shirakawa; Brookside; May (9:02)	Shirakawa; Brookside; May (10:03)	Shirakawa; Brookside; May (12:33)	Syuri; Mirai; Sourei (13:36)	Suzuki; Sera; Kurumi (11:47)	Shirakawa; Brookside; May (11:30)

Semifinals (March 4, 2023)
R1	Neo Stardom Army (Nanae Takahashi, Yuu and Yuna Mizumori)	10:31
B2	Prominence (Suzu Suzuki, Risa Sera and Hiragi Kurumi)	Pin
B1	Abarenbo GE (Syuri, Mirai and Ami Sourei)	Pin
R2	Cosmic Angels (Tam Nakano, Natsupoi and Saki)	11:30

Finals (March 4, 2023)
Prominence (Suzu Suzuki, Risa Sera and Hiragi Kurumi)	Pin
Abarenbo GE (Syuri, Mirai and Ami Sourei)	14:47

== See also ==
- Artist of Stardom Championship
- 5Star Grand Prix Tournament
- Goddesses of Stardom Tag League
