= Ittenyon Stardom Gate =

2024 World Wonder Ring Stardom event

- Promotional poster of the event featuring various wrestlers
- Promotion: World Wonder Ring Stardom
- Date: January 4, 2024
- City: Tokyo, Japan
- Venue: Tokyo Dome City Hall
- Attendance: 1,536

Event chronology
← Previous; New Year Stars	Next → Supreme Fight

Ittenyon Stardom Gate (イッテンヨン スターダム ゲート, Itten'yon sutādamu gēto) was a professional wrestling event promoted by World Wonder Ring Stardom. It took place on January 4, 2024, in Tokyo, Japan, at the Tokyo Dome City Hall.

Seven matches were contested at the event, including one on the pre-show. The main event saw Mayu Iwatani successfully defend the IWGP Women's Championship against Syuri.

== Production ==
=== Background ===
The show featured professional wrestling matches that result from scripted storylines, where wrestlers portray villains, heroes, or less distinguishable characters in the scripted events that build tension and culminate in a wrestling match or series of matches.

=== Event ===
The preshow included two bouts. In the first one, Lady C, Hina and Miyu Amasaki defeated Hanako, Yuzuki and Ranna Yagami, and in the second one, Hazuki, New Blood Tag Team Champions Hanan and Saya Iida picked up a win over Starlight Kid, Fukigen Death and Rina in six-woman tag team competition.

In the first main card bout, Club Venus leader Mina Shirakawa and High Speed Champion Mei Seira outmatched Mai Sakurai and Thekla in tag team action. Next up, Wonder of Stardom Champion Saori Anou, Yuna Mizumori and Saki defeated Natsuko Tora, Momo Watanabe and Ruaka in six-woman tag team action. In the fifth bout, Goddesses of Stardom Champions Utami Hayashishita and Saya Kamitani, alongside AZM picked up a win over two thirds of the Artist of Stardom Champions Mirai and Ami Sohrei, alongside Saki Kashima in six-tag team action. In the semi main event, World of Stardom Champion Maika and Megan Bayne wrestled Strong Women's Champion Giulia and Suzu Suzuki into a time-limit draw. After the bout concluded, Giulia announced the Donna Del Mondo unit's dissolution due to all of the members taking different directions. Thekla announced an indefinite hiatus and Mai Sakurai declared she would follow Giulia further.

In the main event, Mayu Iwatani defeated Syuri to successfully defend the IWGP Women's Championship for the third time consecutively in that respective reign.

== Results ==
No.	Results	Stipulations	Times
1^{P}	Hanako, Yuzuki and Ranna Yagami defeated Queen's Quest (Lady C and Hina) and Sayaka Kurara	Six-woman tag team match	8:11
2	Stars (Hazuki, Hanan and Saya Iida) defeated Oedo Tai (Starlight Kid, Fukigen Death and Rina)	Six-woman tag team match	9:21
3	Mina Shirakawa and Mei Seira defeated Donna Del Mondo (Mai Sakurai and Thekla)	Tag team match	8:42
4	Cosmic Angels (Saori Anou, Yuna Mizumori and Saki) defeated Oedo Tai (Natsuko Tora, Momo Watanabe and Ruaka)	Six-woman tag team match	8:22
5	Queen's Quest (Utami Hayashishita, Saya Kamitani and AZM) defeated God's Eye (Mirai, Ami Sohrei and Saki Kashima)	Six-woman tag team match	10:45
6	Divine Kingdom (Maika and Megan Bayne) vs. Giulia and Suzu Suzuki ended in a time-limit draw	Tag team match	20:00
7	Mayu Iwatani (c) defeated Syuri	Singles match for the IWGP Women's Championship	19:06
(c) / – the champion(s) heading into the match; P / – the match was broadcast on the pre-show
