= Stardom New Year Stars 2024 =

2024 World Wonder Ring Stardom event

- Promotional art work of the pay-per-view
- Promotion: World Wonder Ring Stardom
- Date: January 3, 2024
- City: Yokohama, Japan
- Venue: Yokohama Budokan
- Attendance: 960
- Tagline: "One-day tournament" (一日限りのトーナメント, Tsuitachi tōnamento)

Event chronology
← Previous; Dream Queendom 3	Next → Ittenyon Stardom Gate

Stardom New Year Stars 2024 (スターダム ニューイヤー スターズ 2024, Sutādamu nyūiyā sutāzu 2024) was a professional wrestling event promoted by World Wonder Ring Stardom. It took place on January 3, 2024, in Yokohama, Kanagawa, Japan at the Yokohama Budokan. The event mainly featured the second Triangle Derby tournament and the returning Rookie of Stardom competition recurrent for the year 2023. It was the first pay-per-view organized by Stardom in 2024.

Ten matches were contested at the event, including two on the pre-show. The main event saw Abarenbo GE (Syuri, Mirai, Ami Sohrei) defeat Baribari Bombers (Giulia, Thekla and Mai Sakurai) in the Triangle Derby and won the Artist of Stardom Championship. In another prominent match, Yuzuki defeated Hanako to become the 2023 Rookie of Stardom.

== Production ==
=== Background ===
The show featured ten professional wrestling matches that result from scripted storylines, where wrestlers portray villains, heroes, or less distinguishable characters in the scripted events that build tension and culminate in a wrestling match or series of matches.

=== 2024 Triangle Derby ===
Triangle Derby 2024
- Promotional art work of the 2024 Triangle Derby taking place during the event
- Promotion: World Wonder Ring Stardom
- Date: January 3, 2024
- City: Yokohama, Kanagawa, Japan
- Venue: Yokohama Budokan

Triangle Derby chronology
← Previous; 2023	Next → —

The 2024 edition of the "Triangle Derby" was the second of the tournament's kind, following the inaugural 2023 edition. The tournament concluded in one single day and took place under single elimination rules with eight teams entering the competition. The tournament finals were also disputed for the Artist of Stardom Championship.

Round 1
Suzu Suzuki, Megan Bayne and Mei Seira	Draw (Note: Due to the match ending in a time-limit draw, both teams got eliminated from the tournament.)
Queen's Quest (Utami Hayashishita, Saya Kamitani and AZM)	15:00
Stars (Mayu Iwatani, Hanan and Saya Iida)	9:41
Oedo Tai (Natsuko Tora, Momo Watanabe and Starlight Kid)	Pin
Abarenbo GE (Syuri, Mirai and Ami Sohrei)	Pin
Oedo Tai (Ruaka, Rina and Fukigen Death)	6:26

Round 2
Baribari Bombers (Giulia, Thekla and Mai Sakurai)	N/A
Bye
Oedo Tai (Natsuko Tora, Momo Watanabe and Starlight Kid)	8:22
Abarenbo GE (Syuri, Mirai and Ami Sohrei)	Count-out

Final
Baribari Bombers (Giulia, Thekla and Mai Sakurai)	14:00
Abarenbo GE (Syuri, Mirai and Ami Sohrei)	Pin

=== 2023 Rookie of Stardom ===
Stardom brought back the best rookie tournament following the last edition of the event which occurred in 2019. The tournament took place under the traditional Single-elimination rules with four wrestlers entering the competition.

Round 1
Yuzuki	Pin
Ranna Yagami	6:52
Hanako	Pin
Sayaka Kurara	5:13

Final
Yuzuki	Pin
Hanako	7:23

=== Event ===
The event's preshow included the first round matches of the rookie tournament and were broadcast live on Stardom's YouTube channel. In the first one, Yuzuki picked up a victory over Ranna Yagami. In the second one, Hanako picked up a win over Sayaka Kurara.

In the first main event bout, Lady C defeated Queen's Quest stablemate Hina in singles competition. In the first Triangle Derby match, Suzu Suzuki, Megan Bayne and High Speed Champion Mei Seira wrestled Utami Hayashishita, Saya Kamitani and AZM in a tine-limit draw, therefore attracting each team's elimination from the tournament. After the bout ended, Suzu Suzuki and Mei Seira issued a challenge for Kamitani and Hayashishita's Goddesses of Stardom Championship. Next up, Natsuko Tora, Momo Watanabe and Starlight Kid defeated IWGP Women's Champion Mayu Iwatani and New Blood Tag Team Champions Hanan and Saya Iida to advance into the tournament's second rounds. Next up, Syuri, Mirai and Ami Sohrei defeated Ruaka, Rina and Fukigen Death to advance into the tournament's second rounds. They immediately faced Natsuko Tora, Momo Watanabe and Starlight Kid in the second rounds and defeated them by count-out to make it to the finals. Next up, Nanae Takahashi and Yuu, Hazuki and Saki Kashima defeated World of Stardom Champion Maika, Wonder of Stardom Champion Saori Anou, Mina Shirakawa and Yuna Mizumori in an Eight-woman tag team match. In the semi main event, Yuzuki defeated Hanako to become the 2023 Rookie of Stardom.

In the main event, Syuri, Mirai and Ami Sohrei defeated Giulia, Thekla and Mai Sakurai to win the Triangle Derby and the Artist of Stardom Championship.

== Results ==
No.	Results	Stipulations	Times
1^{P}	Yuzuki defeated Ranna Yagami	Rookie of Stardom first round match	6:52
2^{P}	Hanako defeated Sayaka Kurara	Rookie of Stardom first round match	5:13
3	Lady C defeated Hina (Note: Hina, Lady C and Miyu Amasaki were initially scheduled to compete in the Triangle Derby but the latter pulled out due to being unclear to compete, therefore BariBari Bombers received a bye into the first rounds.)	Singles match	7:39
4	Suzu Suzuki, Megan Bayne and Mei Seira vs. Queen's Quest (Utami Hayashishita, Saya Kamitani and AZM) ended in a time-limit draw	Triangle Derby first round match	15:00
5	Oedo Tai (Natsuko Tora, Momo Watanabe and Starlight Kid) defeated Stars (Mayu Iwatani, Hanan and Saya Iida)	Triangle Derby first round match	9:41
6	Abarenbo GE (Syuri, Mirai and Ami Sohrei) defeated Tokyo Cyber Squad (Ruaka, Rina and Fukigen Death)	Triangle Derby first round match	6:26
7	Abarenbo GE (Syuri, Mirai and Ami Sohrei) defeated Oedo Tai (Natsuko Tora, Momo Watanabe and Starlight Kid) by count-out	Triangle Derby second round match	8:22
8	7Upp (Nanae Takahashi and Yuu), Hazuki and Saki Kashima defeated Maika, Mina Shirakawa and Cosmic Angels (Saori Anou and Yuna Mizumori)	Eight-woman tag team match	16:36
9	Yuzuki defeated Hanako	Stardom Rookie of the Year final	7:23
10	Abarenbo GE (Syuri, Mirai and Ami Sohrei) defeated Baribari Bombers (Giulia, Thekla and Mai Sakurai) (c)	Triangle Derby final for the Artist of Stardom Championship	14:00
(c) / – the champion(s) heading into the match; P / – the match was broadcast on the pre-show
