= Yuko Sakurai =

Japanese professional wrestler

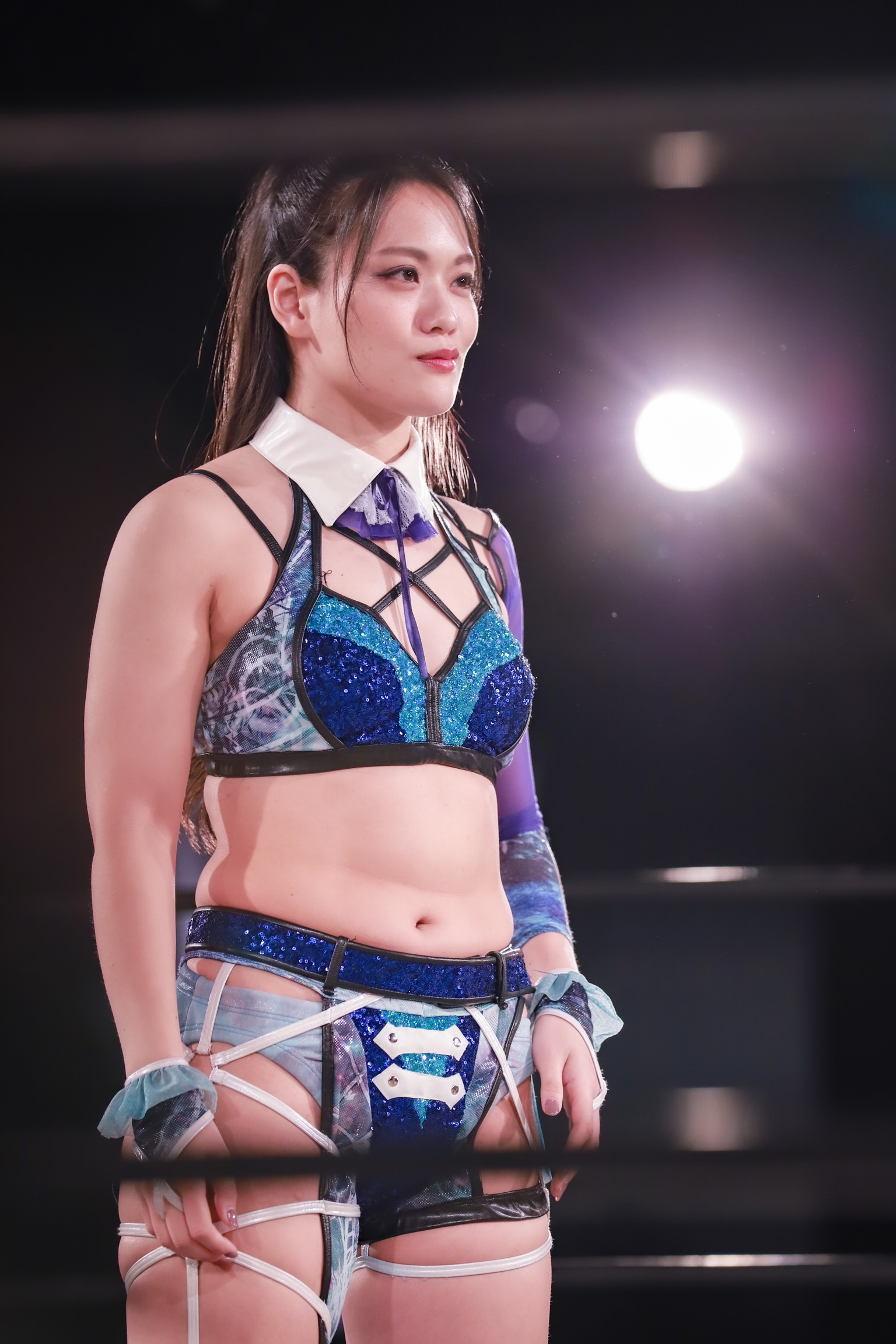
- Sakurai in April 2023

Personal information
- Born: August 28, 1991 (age 34) Ehime, Japan

Professional wrestling career
- Ring name: Yuko Sakurai
- Billed height: 163 cm (5 ft 4 in)
- Billed weight: 58 kg (128 lb)
- Debut: 2018

Yuko Sakurai (櫻井裕子, Sakurai Yuhko; born August 28, 1991) is a Japanese professional wrestler currently working as a freelancer and is best known for her tenure with the Japanese promotion Actwres girl'Z, Ice Ribbon and Pro Wrestling Wave.

== Professional wrestling career ==
=== Independent circuit (2018–present) ===
Due to being a freelancer, Sakurai is known for competing in various promotions from the Japanese independent scene. At a house show promoted by Pure-J on September 4, 2022, she unsuccessfully challenged Crea for the Princess of Pro Wrestling Championship. At SEAdLINNNG October Fist!, an event promoted by Seadlinnng on October 19, 2022, Sakurai teamed up with Saki and unsuccessfully challenged Las Fresa de Egoistas (Asuka and Makoto) for the Beyond the Sea Tag Team Championship. At WAVE Survival Dance ~ Regina Challenge, an event promoted by Pro Wrestling Wave on October 24, 2022, Sakurai competed in a battle royal to determine the number one contender for the Wave Single Championship won by Yuki Miyazaki and also involving notable opponents such as Akari, Aoi, Ayame Sasamura, Cherry, Yumi Ohka, Miyako Matsumoto and many others.

=== Actwres girl'Z (2018–present) ===
Sakurai made her professional wrestling debut in Actwres girl'Z at AgZ Actwres girl'Z In Korakuen On November 15, 2018, where she unsuccessfully competed in a four-way match won by Yumiko Hotta and also involving Ayumi Hayashi and Misa Matsui.

=== Ice Ribbon (2021–present) ===
Sakurai made her first appearance in Ice Ribbon at New Ice Ribbon #1161 ~ Sweet November on November 28, 2021, where she teamed up with Akane Fujita in a losing effort against Rebel X Enemy (Maika Ozaki and Ram Kaicho). At New Ice Ribbon #1204 on May 28, 2022, she participated in a tournament for the vacant ICE Cross Infinity Championship where she fell short to Makoto in the first rounds. At New Ice Ribbon #1194 on April 23, 2022, Sakurai teamed up with Asahi, Hamuko Hoshi, Ibuki Hoshi, Kaho Matsushita, Kiku, Nao Ishikawa, Rina Amikura, Saran, Yappy and Yuki Mashiro to defeat Dropkickers (Tsukasa Fujimoto and Tsukushi Haruka) in an eleven-on-two handicap match. At the Kizuna Tournament, Ice Ribbon's greatest yearly event, Sakurai teamed up with Asahi and defeated Saori Anou and Sumika Yanagawa but fell short to Amin and Ibuki Hoshi in the semifinals held on the same night on October 30, 2022.

=== World Wonder Ring Stardom (2022–2023) ===
Sakurai made her debut in World Wonder Ring Stardom in the "New Blood" brand, making her first appearance at the second event of its kind from May 13, 2022, where she teamed up with Rina Amikura, picking up a victory over Stars (Saya Iida and Momo Kohgo). At Stardom in Korakuen Hall on June 5, 2022, Unagi Sayaka, Tam Nakano and Mina Shirakawa defeated Sakurai who teamed up with her Color's promotion mates Saki and Hikari Shimizu in a loser joins enemy unit. The latter three announced that they will compete as a sub-unit of Cosmic Angels in the future, and Rina Amikura was also reported to have joined the unit due to being part of Color's at that time. At Stardom New Blood 3 on July 8, 2022, Sakurai teamed up with Rina Amikura, Unagi Sayaka and Mina Shirakawa in a losing effort against Oedo Tai (Starlight Kid, Ruaka and Rina) and Haruka Umesaki. On the first night of the Stardom Mid Summer Champions from July 9, 2022, Sakurai unsuccessfully competed in a three-way match won by Lady C and also involving Hina. Sakurai competed in the Triangle Derby I alongside Rina Amikura and Waka Tsukiyama under the team name of Lollipop. Together, they competed against the teams of Club Venus (Mina Shirakawa, Xia Brookside and Mariah May), Neo Stardom Army (Nanae Takahashi, Yuu and Yuna Mizumori), Queen's Quest (Utami Hayashishita, Saya Kamitani and AZM), Unique Glare (Starlight Kid, Haruka Umesaki and Ruaka), Cosmic Angels (Tam Nakano, Saki and Natsupoi), H&M's (Mayu Iwatani, Hanan and Momo Kohgo), and Baribari Bombers (Giulia, Thekla and Mai Sakurai).

== Championships and accomplishments ==
- Pro Wrestling Wave
  - Wave Tag Team Championship (2 times) – with Yuki Miyazaki (1) and Rina Amikura (1)
  - Catch the Wave Award
    - Fighting Spirit Award (2023)
