= Rina Amikura =

Japanese professional wrestler

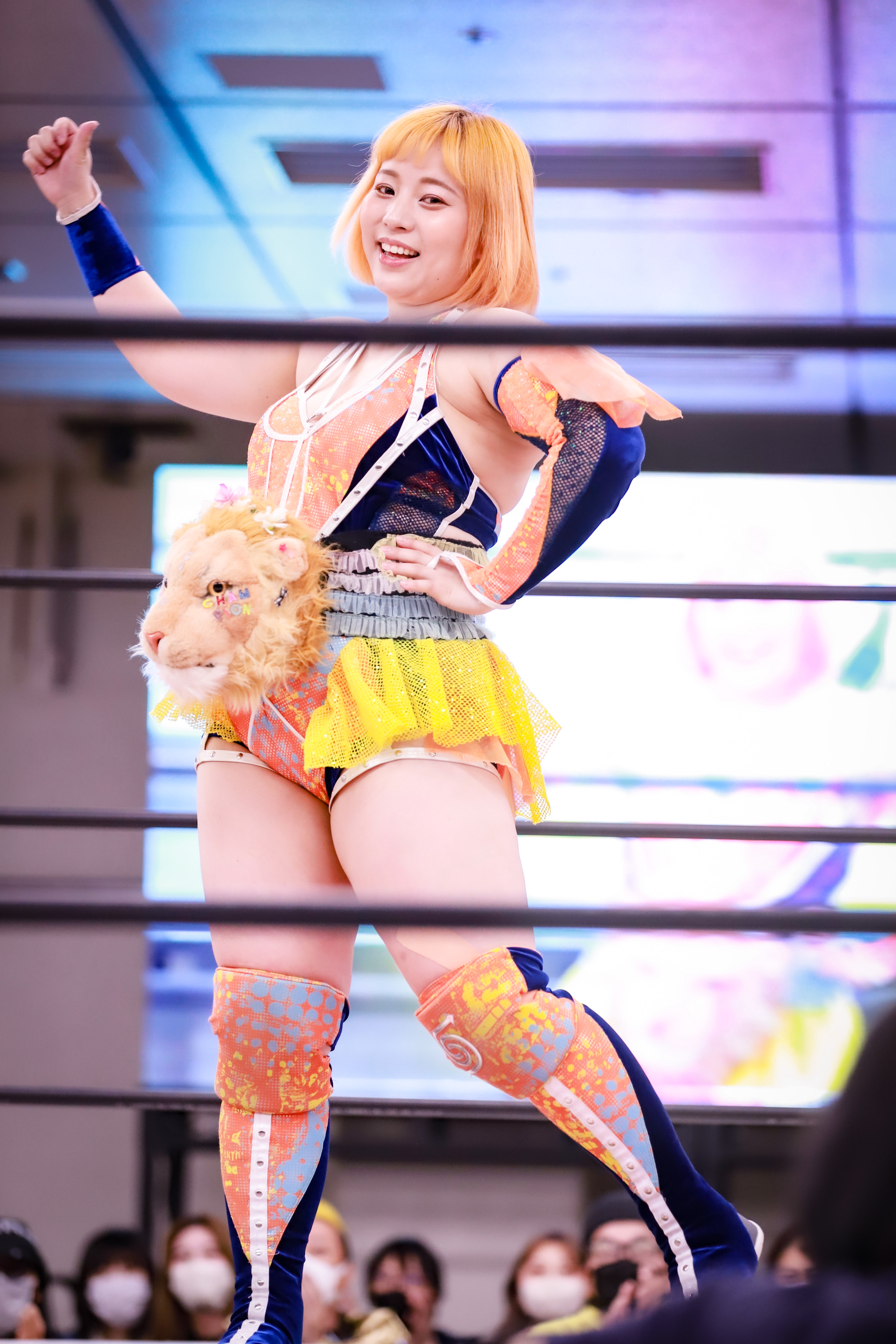
- Amikura in March 2023

Personal information
- Born: January 20, 1995 (age 31) Nagano, Japan

Professional wrestling career
- Ring name(s): Amin; Rina Amikura
- Billed height: 163 cm (5 ft 4 in)
- Billed weight: 68 kg (150 lb)
- Debut: 2018

Rina Amikura (網倉理奈, Amikura Rina; born January 20, 1995) is a Japanese professional wrestler currently working as a freelancer and is best known for her tenures with the Japanese promotions Actwres girl'Z, Ice Ribbon and Pro Wrestling Wave.

== Professional wrestling career ==
=== Independent circuit (2018–present) ===
Due to being a freelancer, Amikura is known for competing in various promotions from the Japanese independent scene. At ZERO1 Kumamoto Ekimae Pro-Wrestling 2021, an event promoted by Pro Wrestling Zero1 on December 4, 2021, Amikura teamed up with Haruka Umesaki in a losing effort against Hanako Nakamori and Takako Inoue. At WAVE Survival Dance ~ Regina Challenge, an event promoted by Pro Wrestling Wave on October 24, 2022, she competed in a battle royal to determine the number one contender for the Wave Single Championship won by Yuki Miyazaki and also involving notable opponents such as Akari, Aoi, Ayame Sasamura, Hibiscus Mii, Miyuki Takase, Yumi Ohka, Miyako Matsumoto and many others. At WAVE Dai Shiwasu East 2022, Amikura teamed up with Yuki Miyazaki and unsuccessfully faced Kaori Yoneyama and Cherry in a number one contendership match for the Wave Tag Team Championship.

==== Actwres girl'Z (2018–present) ====
Amikura made her professional wrestling debut in Actwres girl'Z at AgZ Act 30 on May 13, 2018, where she unsuccessfully faced Kakeru Sekiguchi.

==== Ice Ribbon (2020–present) ====
Amikura made her first appearance in Ice Ribbon at Ice Ribbon/AWG Ice Ribbon, a cross-over event held in partnership with Actwres girl'Z on November 16, 2020, where she competed in a six-on-two handicap match in which she, alongside Ayumi Hayashi, Momo Tani, Yappy, Yoshiko Hasegawa and Yuki Mashiro defeated Hamuko Hoshi and Tsukasa Fujimoto. At Ice Ribbon New Ice Ribbon #1203 on May 28, 2022, she participated in a tournament for the vacant ICE Cross Infinity Championship where she defeated Sumika Yanagawa in the first rounds, but fell short to Saori Anou in the second ones. In Ice Ribbon, Amikura belongs to the "KissMet Princes" stable and often fights under the ring name of Amin. At Ice Ribbon New Ice Ribbon #1199 on May 4, 2022, she teamed up with stablemates Misa Kagura and Nao Ishikawa to defeat Cherry, Hiroyo Matsumoto and Kiku. At CMLL Lady's Ring, a cross-over event promoted by both Ice Ribbon and CMLL, Amikura teamed up with Maya Yukihi and Rina Yamashita to unsuccessfully face Dalys la Caribeña, Ibuki Hoshi and Makoto in a no-touch rules match.

==== World Wonder Ring Stardom (2022–2023) ====
Amikura made her debut in World Wonder Ring Stardom in the "New Blood" brand, making her first appearance at the second event of its kind from May 13, 2022, where she teamed up with Yuko Sakurai, picking up a victory over Stars (Saya Iida and Momo Kohgo). At Stardom in Korakuen Hall on June 5, 2022, Unagi Sayaka, Tam Nakano and Mina Shirakawa defeated Sakurai who teamed up with her Color's promotion mates Saki and Hikari Shimizu in a loser joins enemy unit. The latter three announced that they will compete as a sub-unit of Cosmic Angels in the future, and Amikura was also reported to have joined the unit due to being part of Color's at that time. At Stardom New Blood 3 on July 8, 2022, Amikura teamed up with Yuko Sakurai, Unagi Sayaka and Mina Shirakawa in a losing effort against Oedo Tai (Starlight Kid, Ruaka and Rina) and Haruka Umesaki. On the second night of the Stardom Mid Summer Champions from July 24, 2022, Amikura teamed up with Mai Sakurai to defeat Stars (Hanan and Saya Iida). Amikura competed in the Triangle Derby I alongside Yuko Sakurai and Waka Tsukiyama under the team name of Lollipop. Together, they competed against the teams of Club Venus (Mina Shirakawa, Xia Brookside and Mariah May), Neo Stardom Army (Nanae Takahashi, Yuu and Yuna Mizumori), Queen's Quest (Utami Hayashishita, Saya Kamitani and AZM), Unique Glare (Starlight Kid, Haruka Umesaki and Ruaka), Cosmic Angels (Tam Nakano, Saki and Natsupoi), H&M's (Mayu Iwatani, Hanan and Momo Kohgo), and Baribari Bombers (Giulia, Thekla and Mai Sakurai).

== Championships and accomplishments ==
- Actwres girl'Z
  - Color’s Championship (2 times)
- Pro Wrestling Wave
  - Wave Tag Team Championship (1 time) – with Yuko Sakurai
- World Woman Pro-Wrestling Diana
  - World Woman Pro-Wrestling Diana Tag Team Championship (1 time) – with Nanami
