= Ami Sohrei =

Japanese professional wrestler

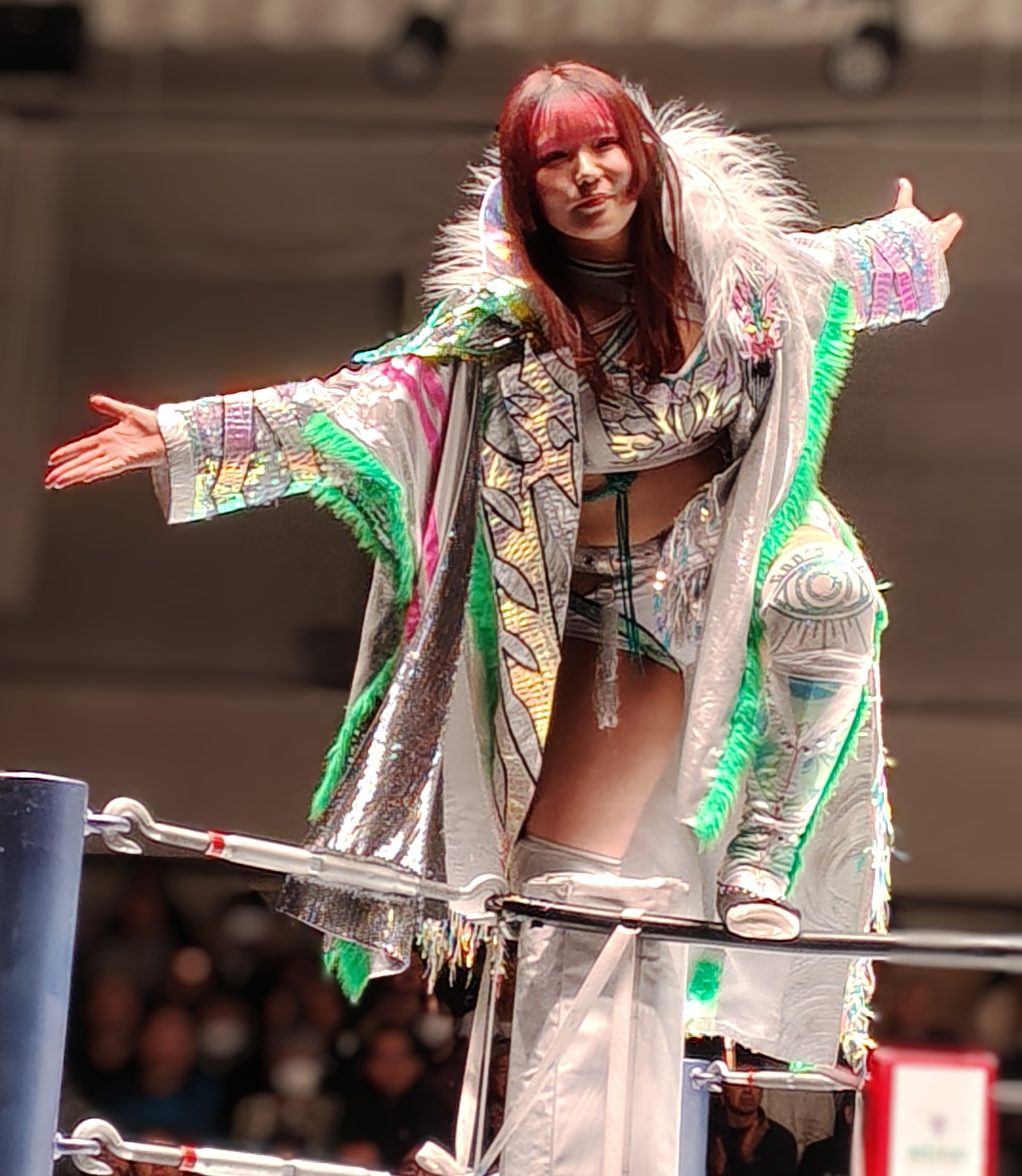
- Sohrei in January 2026

Personal information
- Born: Ami Miura; March 20, 1997 (age 29) Fukushima, Japan

Professional wrestling career
- Ring names: Ami Miura; Ami Sohrei; Tokiwa
- Billed height: 170 cm (5 ft 7 in)
- Billed weight: 70 kg (154 lb)
- Debut: 2020

Ami Miura (三浦 亜美, Miura Ami; born March 20, 1997), better known by her ring name Ami Sohrei (壮麗 亜美, Sōrei Ami), is a Japanese professional wrestler. She is signed to World Wonder Ring Stardom, where she is a member of God's Eye and a former Future of Stardom Champion.

Sohrei is a former one-time Future of Stardom Champion and one-time Goddesses of Stardom Champion.

== Professional wrestling career ==
=== Actwres girl'Z (2020-2021) ===
Sohrei made her professional wrestling debut on August 14, 2020, where she fell short to Noki-A at AWG Act In Korakuen Hall, an event promoted by Actwres girl'Z (AWG). While with AWG, Sohrei took part in their Action Ring Girls show, where she performed as Tokiwa in the Kaguya faction. On December 18, 2021, Sohrei wrestled in her last match for AWG, where she defeated Miyuki Takase.

=== Independent circuit (2020–present) ===
Sohrei is also known for her work in the Japanese independent scene. She took part of the 2021 edition of the Young Block Oh! Oh! division of Pro Wrestling Wave's Catch the Wave tournament where she ended on the second place of the Block A with a total score of tying give points with the winner Tomoka Inaba and also against Momo Kohgo and Shizuku Tsukata. She once competed in Ice Ribbon at New Ice Ribbon #1152 In 176BOX on October 17, 2021, where she teamed up with Akane Fujita in a losing effort against Thekla and Misa Matsui. On the third night of Sendai Girls' Pro Wrestling's Keep Burning show on October 21, 2021, Sohrei teamed up with Ayame Sasamura in a losing effort against Team 200 kg (Chihiro Hashimoto and Yuu).

=== World Wonder Ring Stardom (2022–present) ===
Sohrei debuted in World Wonder Ring Stardom on the first night of the World Climax 2022 on March 26, 2022, where she was announced as the first member of Syuri's newly created stable God's Eye. Sohrei wrestled her first match in the promotion on April 3, where she lost to Syuri in the first round of the 2022 Cinderella Tournament. At Fight in the Top on June 26, Sohrei, Syuri and Mirai unsuccessfully challenged Oedo Tai (Saki Kashima, Momo Watanabe and Starlight Kid) and Donna Del Mondo (Giulia, Maika and Mai Sakurai) for the Artist of Stardom Championship. Sohrei qualified for the 2022 5 Star Grand Prix by winning a qualifier block league where she scored a total of eight points. At New Blood 5 on October 9, Sohrei won the Future of Stardom Championship by defeating Hanan. During her reign, Sohrei successfully defended the Future of Stardom Championship against various contenders, among them were Mai Sakurai, Lady C and a former champion, Ruaka.

On April 23, 2023, at All Star Grand Queendom, Sohrei and Mirai teamed together under the tag team name The New Eras and won the Goddesses of Stardom Championship by defeating 7Upp. At New Blood 8 on May 12, Sohrei lost the Future of Stardom Championship to Rina, ending her reign at 205 days. At Sunshine 2023 on June 25, The New Eras lost the Goddesses of Stardom Championship to Rose Gold, ending their reign at 63 days.

At New Years Stars 2024 on January 3, 2024, Sohrei, Mirai and Syuri, together known as Abarenbo GE, participated in the 2024 Triangle Derby. They defeated Baribari Bombers in the finals to win the tournament and the Artist of Stardom Championship.

== Championships and accomplishments ==
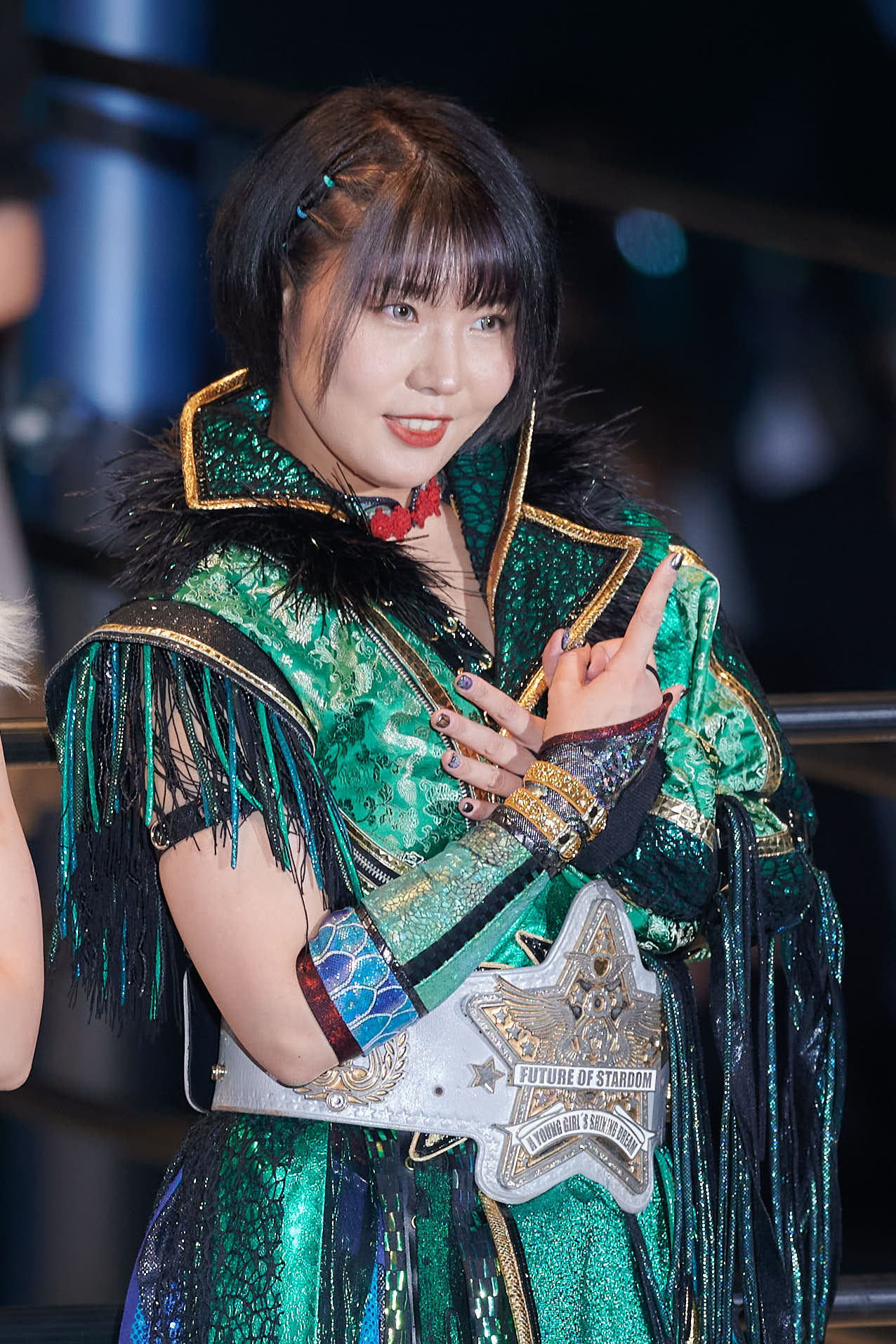
In World Wonder Ring Stardom, Sohrei is a one-time Future of Stardom Champion.

- Pro Wrestling Illustrated
  - Ranked No. 109 of the top 250 female singles wrestlers in the PWI Women's 250 in 2023
- World Wonder Ring Stardom
  - Future of Stardom Championship (1 time)
  - Goddesses of Stardom Championship (1 time) – with Mirai
  - Artist of Stardom Championship (2 time) – with Syuri and Mirai (1), Hina and Lady C (1)
  - Triangle Derby (2024) – with Syuri and Mirai
  - 5★Star GP Award (1 times)
    - 5★Star GP Outstanding Performance Award (2026)
