= Artist of Stardom Championship =

Professional wrestling trios championship

- The Artist of Stardom Championship belts

Details
- Promotion: World Wonder Ring Stardom
- Date established: December 24, 2012
- Current champions: Triangle of Madness (Thekla, Julia Hart and Skye Blue)
- Date won: July 18, 2026

Other name
- Artists of Stardom Championship
Statistics
- First champions: Kawasaki Katsushika Saikyou Densetsu (Act Yasukawa, Natsuki☆Taiyo and Saki Kashima)
- Most reigns: As a team (2 reigns): Queen's Quest (AZM, HZK and Io Shirai); Stars (Mayu Iwatani, Saki Kashima and Tam Nakano); As an individual (6 reigns): Io Shirai (6 reigns)
- Longest reign: Cosmic Angels (Mina Shirakawa, Tam Nakano and Unagi Sayaka) (291 days)
- Shortest reign: Queen's Quest (AZM, HZK and Io Shirai) (21 days)
- Oldest champion: Fukigen Death (44 years, 6 months and 15 days)
- Youngest champion: AZM (14 years, 6 months and 14 days)
- Heaviest champion: Alpha Female (95 kg (209 lb))
- Lightest champion: AZM (40 kg (88 lb))

The Artist of Stardom Championship (アーティスト・オブ・スターダム王座, Ātisuto Obu Sutādamu Ōza) is a professional wrestling six-woman tag team championship owned by World Wonder Ring Stardom. The title was first announced during Stardom's year-end event on December 24, 2012, and two days later its name was revealed as the "Artist of Stardom Championship", with a four-team one night single-elimination tournament announced to determine the inaugural champions.

== Title history ==
=== Belt design ===
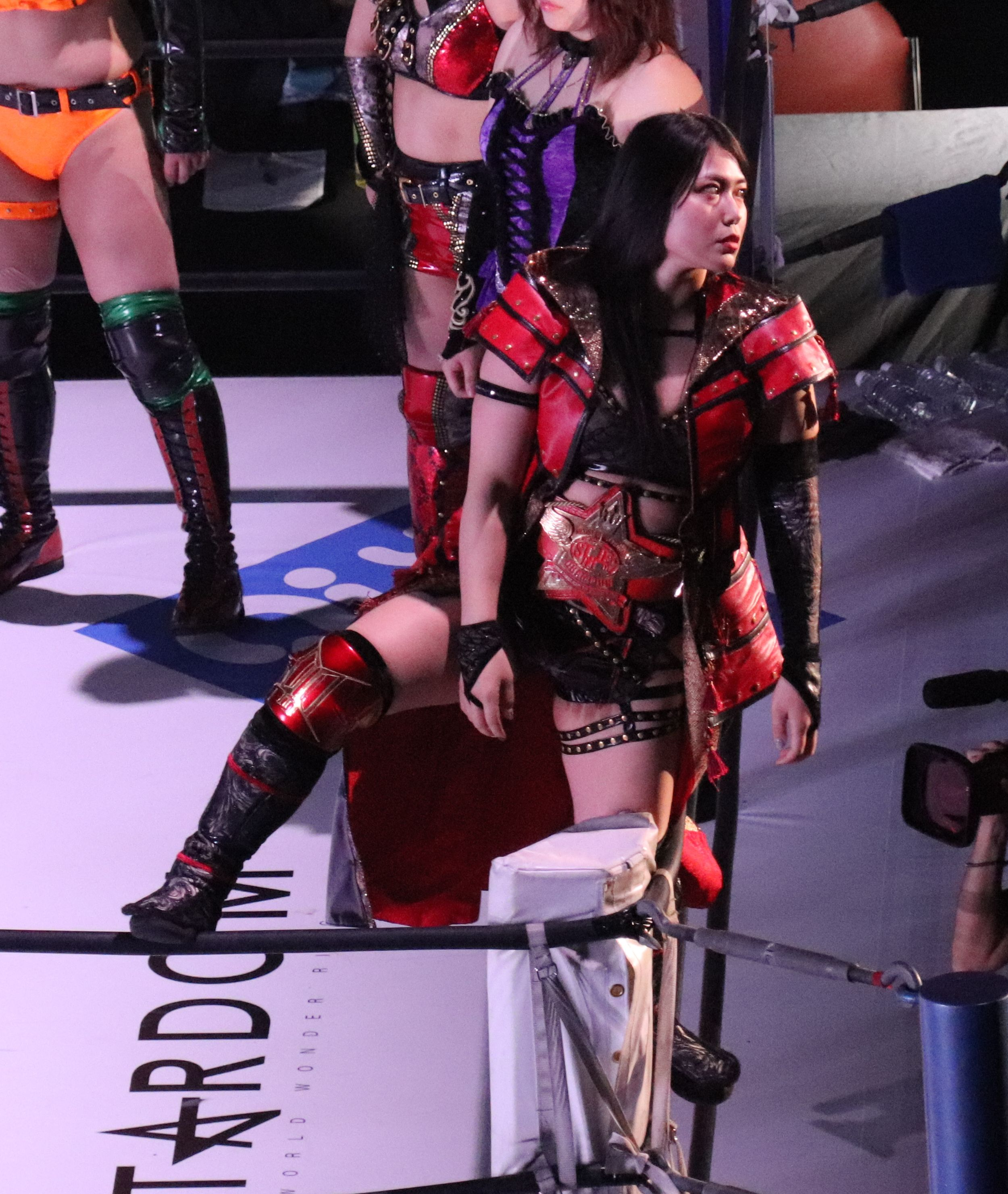
Maika with the orange belt

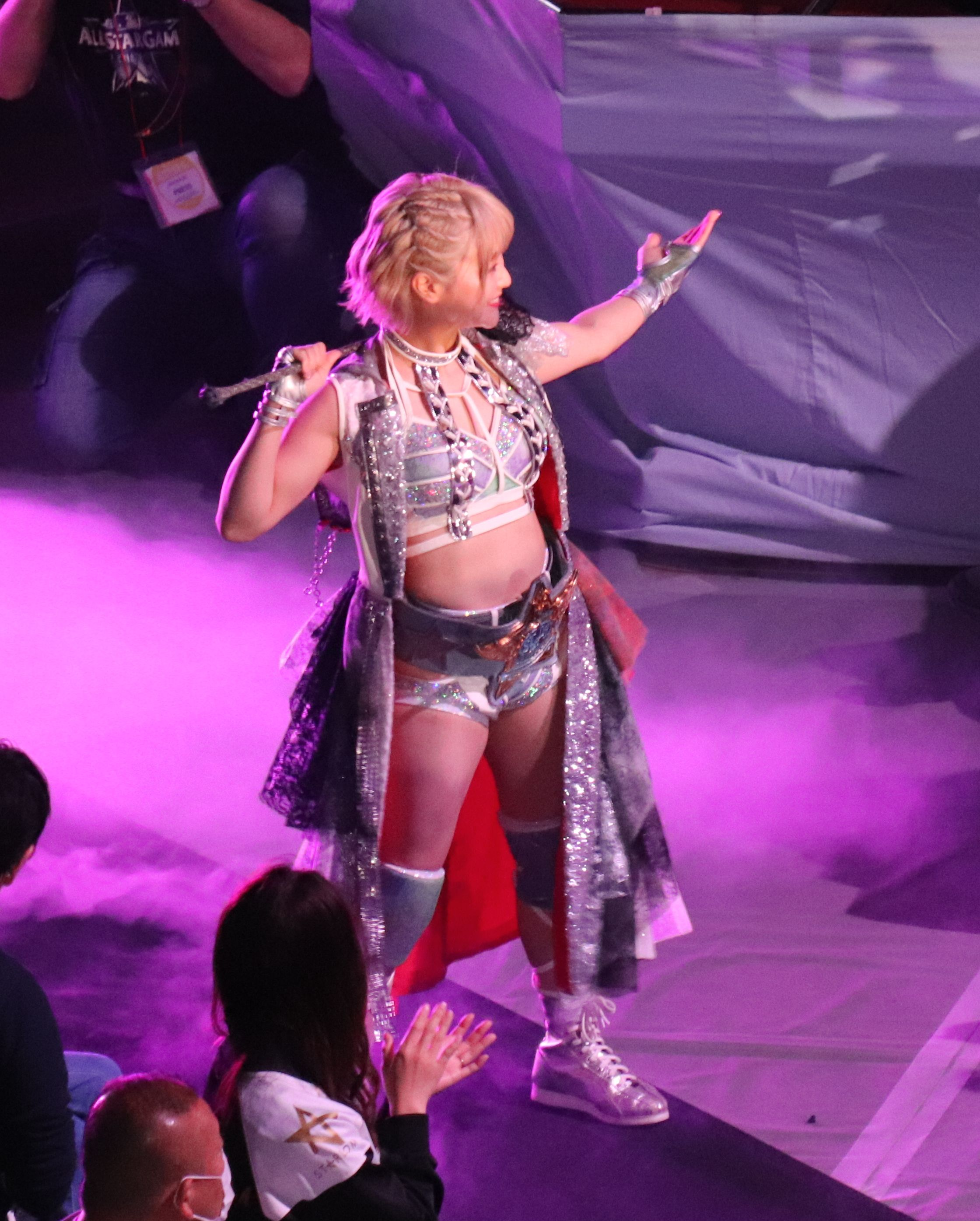
Natsupoi with the blue belt

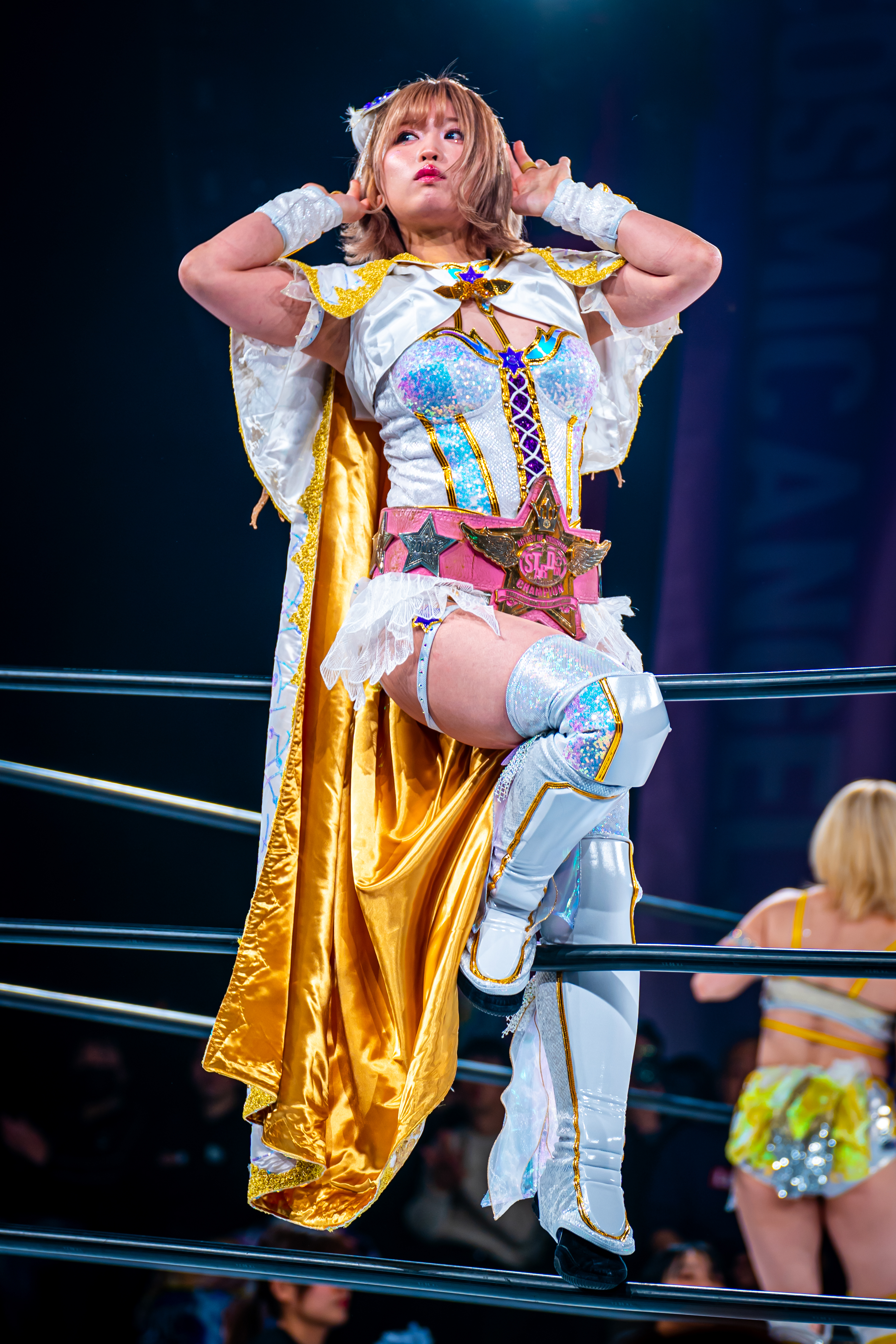
Tam Nakano with the pink belt

On January 14, 2013, Kawasaki Katsushika Saikyou Densetsu (Act Yasukawa, Natsuki☆Taiyo and Saki Kashima) defeated Team Shimmer (Kellie Skater, Portia Perez and Tomoka Nakagawa) in the finals of the tournament to become the inaugural champions.

The championship belts were introduced on February 6, 2013, when they arrived to Stardom's office from their American maker "Top Rope Belts". The belts are rare among all other tag team championship belts in that they are all of different color; one is blue, one orange and one pink. There is no rule for the belt color distribution into the teams. Each title holder gets to choose her own belt colour freely. The biggest star-shaped plate is inscribed with "Three stars make the highest magic", while the three smaller star plates feature the words "high, art, bonds". These inscriptions depict the strong unity of the three-woman tag team which holds the championship.

=== April 15, 2017 tournament ===
On April 9, 2017, the title was vacated after Momo Watanabe was unable to perform due to an injury. On April 15, a one-day, four-team tournament took place to crown a new champion. The winners were Queen's Quest (AZM, HZK and Io Shirai).

Semifinals
AZM, HZK and Io Shirai	Pin
Hiroyo Matsumoto, Jungle Kyona and Natsuko Tora	12:04
Hana Kimura, Kagetsu and La Rosa Negra	Pin
Hiromi Mimura, Kairi Hojo and Konami	12:28

Finals
AZM, HZK and Io Shirai	Pin
Hana Kimura, Kagetsu and La Rosa Negra	14:58

== Reigns ==
As of November 22, 2026, there have been a total of 37 reigns shared between 33 teams composed of 54 individual champions and five vacancies. The inaugural championship team was Kawasaki Katsushika Saikyou Densetsu (Act Yasukawa, Natsuki☆Taiyo and Saki Kashima). The teams Stars (Mayu Iwatani, Saki Kashima and Tam Nakano) and Queen's Quest (AZM, HZK and Io Shirai) are tied with most reigns at two, while individually, Shirai has the most reigns at six. As a team, Cosmic Angels (Mina Shirakawa, Nakano and Unagi Sayaka) has the longest reign at 291 days, while AZM's, HZK's, and Shirai's second reign is the shortest at 13 days. Kyoko Kimura is the oldest champion at 39 years old, while AZM is the youngest at 14 years old.

The current champions are the team of Triangle of Madness (Thekla, Julia Hart and Skye Blue), who are in their first reign as a team, but second for Thekla individually. They won the titles by defeating DREAM TRINE (Ami Sohrei, Hina, and Lady C) on the first night of the Stardom 5 Star Grand Prix 2026 in Tokyo, Japan, on July 18, 2026.

Key
No.	Overall reign number
Reign	Reign number for the specific team—reign numbers for the individuals are in parentheses, if different
Days	Number of days held
Defenses	Number of successful defenses
+	Current reign is changing daily

No.	Champion	Championship change			Reign statistics			Notes	Ref.
No.	Champion	Date	Event	Location	Reign	Days	Defenses	Notes	Ref.
World Wonder Ring Stardom (ST★RDOM)
1	Kawasaki Katsushika Saikyou Densetsu (Act Yasukawa, Natsuki☆Taiyo and Saki Kashima)	January 14, 2013	New Year Stars 2013: Stardom Day of the 2nd Anniversary	Tokyo, Japan	1	115	0	Defeated Team Shimmer (Kellie Skater, Portia Perez and Tomoka Nakagawa) in the finals of a four-team tournament to become the inaugural champions.	
—	Vacated	May 9, 2013	—	Tokyo, Japan	—	—	—	The championship was vacated after Act Yasukawa was sidelined with a cervical spine injury.	
2	Chibis (Kairi Hojo, Kaori Yoneyama and Yuhi)	June 23, 2013	Chapter Two Beginning	Tokyo, Japan	1	134	2	Defeated Kimura Monster-gun (Christina Von Eerie, Hailey Hatred and Kyoko Kimura) in a decision match to win the vacant championship.	
3	Kimura Monster-gun (Alpha Female, The Female Predator Amazon and Kyoko Kimura)	November 4, 2013	Stardom 100th Commemorative Tournament	Tokyo, Japan	1	55	0		
4	Tawashis (Hiroyo Matsumoto, Mayu Iwatani and Miho Wakizawa)	December 29, 2013	Stardom Yearend Climax 2013	Tokyo, Japan	1	224	4		
5	Tomodachi Mania (Hatsuhinode Kamen, Kaori Yoneyama and Tsubasa Kuragaki)	August 10, 2014	Stardom × Stardom 2014	Tokyo, Japan	1 (1, 2, 1)	119	0		
6	Heisei-gun (Io Shirai, Mayu Iwatani and Takumi Iroha)	December 7, 2014	Rookie of Stardom 2014	Tokyo, Japan	1 (1, 2, 1)	128	1		
—	Vacated	April 14, 2015	—	Tokyo, Japan	—	—	—	The championship was vacated after Takumi Iroha was sidelined with a ruptured anterior cruciate ligament.	
7	Candy Crush (Chelsea, Kairi Hojo and Koguma)	May 3, 2015	Golden Week Stars 2015	Tokyo, Japan	1 (1, 2, 1)	209	0	Defeated Heisei-gun (Io Shirai, Mayu Iwatani and Reo Hazuki) in a decision match to win the vacant championship.	
—	Vacated	November 28, 2015	—	—	—	—	—	The championship declared vacant by Stardom due to Koguma having been fired from the promotion on September 15, 2015.	
8	Team Hyper Destroyers (Evie, Hiroyo Matsumoto and Kellie Skater)	December 6, 2015	Goddesses of Stars 2015	Tokyo, Japan	1 (1, 2, 1)	84	2	Defeated Io Shirai, Mayu Iwatani and Momo Watanabe and Oedo Tai (Act Yasukawa, Kris Wolf and Kyoko Kimura) in a three-way tag team match to win the vacant championship.	
9	Threedom (Io Shirai, Kairi Hojo and Mayu Iwatani)	February 28, 2016	Osaka Taikai	Osaka, Japan	1 (2, 3, 3)	217	2		
10	Oedo Tai (Hana Kimura, Kagetsu and Kyoko Kimura)	October 2, 2016	Shin-Kiba Taikai	Tokyo, Japan	1 (1, 1, 2)	97	2	Viper replaced Hana Kimura and defended the championship as Kimura was sidelined with a wrist injury.	
11	Queen's Quest (HZK, Io Shirai and Momo Watanabe)	January 7, 2017	New Year Stars 2017	Osaka, Japan	1 (1, 3, 1)	92	0		
—	Vacated	April 9, 2017	—	—	—	—	—	The championship was vacated due to Momo Watanabe being sidelined with an injury.	
12	Queen's Quest (AZM, HZK and Io Shirai)	April 15, 2017	Grow Up Stars 2017	Yokohama, Japan	1 (1, 2, 4)	21	0	Defeated Oedo Tai (Hana Kimura, Kagetsu and Rosa Negra) in the finals of a four-team tournament to win the vacant championship.	
13	Hiromi Mimura, Kairi Hojo and Konami	May 6, 2017	GoldenWeek Stars 2017	Tokyo, Japan	1 (1, 4, 1)	29	1		
14	Queen's Quest (AZM, HZK and Io Shirai)	June 4, 2017	Shining Stars 2017	Tokyo, Japan	2 (2, 3, 5)	13	0		
15	Team Jungle (Hiroyo Matsumoto, Jungle Kyona and Kaori Yoneyama)	June 17, 2017	Shining Stars 2017	Yokohama, Japan	1 (3, 1, 3)	57	0		
16	Queen's Quest (HZK, Io Shirai and Viper)	August 13, 2017	Midsummer Champions 2017	Tokyo, Japan	1 (4, 6, 1)	245	3		
—	Vacated	April 15, 2018	—	—	—	—	—	The championship was declared vacant following the Stardom draft.	
17	J.A.N. (Jungle Kyona, Natsuko Tora and Kaori Yoneyama)	May 27, 2018	Stardom at Osaka	Osaka, Japan	1 (2, 1, 4)	126	2	Defeated Oedo Tai (Kagetsu, Hana Kimura and Hazuki) to win the vacant championship.	
18	Stars (Mayu Iwatani, Saki Kashima and Tam Nakano)	September 30, 2018	Stardom 5★Star Grand Prix 2018 - Grand Champion Carnival	Nagoya, Japan	1 (4, 2, 1)	228	4		
19	Tokyo Cyber Squad (Hana Kimura, Jungle Kyona and Konami)	May 16, 2019	Stardom Gold May 2019	Tokyo, Japan	1 (2, 3, 2)	38	1		
20	Stars (Mayu Iwatani, Saki Kashima and Tam Nakano)	June 23, 2019	Stardom Saki Kashima's Homecoming	Matsue, Japan	2 (5, 3, 2)	27	1		
21	Oedo Tai (Andras Miyagi, Kagetsu and Sumire Natsu)	July 20, 2019	Stardom World Big Summer in Osaka	Osaka, Japan	1 (1, 2, 1)	126	1		
22	Queen's Quest (AZM, Momo Watanabe and Utami Hayashishita)	November 23, 2019	Stardom Goddess of Stars 2019 - Night 1	Tokyo, Japan	1 (3, 2, 1)	77	1		
23	Donna Del Mondo (Giulia, Maika and Syuri)	February 8, 2020	The Way to Major League	Tokyo, Japan	1	280	2		
24	Oedo Tai (Bea Priestley, Natsuko Tora and Saki Kashima)	November 14, 2020	Korakuen New Landscape	Tokyo, Japan	1 (1, 2, 4)	32	0		
25	Stars/Cosmic Angels (Mina Shirakawa, Tam Nakano and Unagi Sayaka)	December 16, 2020	Road to Osaka Dream Cinderella - Day 2	Tokyo, Japan	1 (1, 3, 1)	291	7	On December 20, 2020, Nakano, Shirakawa and Sayaka split up from being a Stars sub-unit and acted as the independent unit of Cosmic Angels ever since.	
26	MaiHimePoi (Himeka, Maika and Natsupoi)	October 3, 2021	Stardom in Nagoya	Nagoya, Japan	1 (1, 2, 1)	237	7		
27	Oedo Tai (Momo Watanabe, Saki Kashima and Starlight Kid)	May 28, 2022	Flashing Champions	Tokyo, Japan	1 (3, 5, 1)	215	5		
28	Prominence (Hiragi Kurumi, Risa Sera and Suzu Suzuki)	December 29, 2022	Dream Queendom 2	Tokyo, Japan	1	115	2	This was a Harcdore six-woman tag team match.	
29	REStart (Kairi, Natsupoi and Saori Anou)	April 23, 2023	All Star Grand Queendom	Yokohama, Japan	1 (5, 2, 1)	34	0	Despite being a sub-group of the Cosmic Angels, only Natsupoi and Saori Anou were part of the bigger unit.	
30	Baribari Bombers (Giulia, Mai Sakurai and Thekla)	May 27, 2023	Flashing Champions	Tokyo, Japan	1 (2, 1, 1)	221	3		
31	Abarenbo GE (Syuri, Mirai and Ami Sohrei)	January 3, 2024	New Year Stars	Yokohama, Japan	1 (2, 1, 1)	87	1		
32	Empress Nexus Venus (Maika, Mina Shirakawa and Xena)	March 30, 2024	Stardom in Sendai	Sendai, Japan	1 (3, 2, 1)	127	2		
33	Cosmic Angels (Tam Nakano, Saori Anou and Natsupoi)	August 4, 2024	Stardom in Hamamatsu	Hamamatsu, Japan	1 (4, 2, 3)	182	2		
34	Neo Genesis (Starlight Kid, AZM and Miyu Amasaki)	February 2, 2025	Supreme Fight 2025	Tokyo, Japan	1 (2, 4, 1)	220	2		
35	H.A.T.E. (Konami, Rina and Fukigen Death)	September 10, 2025	Nighter in Korakuen	Tokyo, Japan	1 (3, 1, 5)	258	4		
36	Dream Trine (Ami Sohrei, Hina and Lady C)	May 26, 2026	Nighter in Korakuen	Tokyo, Japan	1 (2, 1, 1)	53	2		
37	Triangle of Madness (Thekla, Julia Hart and Skye Blue)	July 18, 2026	5 Star Grand Prix (Night 1)	Tokyo, Japan	1 (2, 1, 1)	127+	2		

== Combined reigns ==
As of November 22, 2026.

†	Indicates the current champions

=== By team ===
Rank	Team	No. of reigns	Combined defenses	Combined days
1	Stars/Cosmic Angels (Mina Shirakawa, Tam Nakano and Unagi Sayaka)	1	7	291
2	Donna Del Mondo (Giulia, Maika and Syuri)	1	2	280
3	H.A.T.E (Konami, Rina and Fukigen Death)	1	4	258
4	Stars (Mayu Iwatani, Saki Kashima and Tam Nakano)	2	5	255
5	Queen's Quest (HZK, Io Shirai and Viper)	1	3	245
6	MaiHimePoi (Himeka, Maika and Natsupoi)	1	7	237
7	Tawashis (Hiroyo Matsumoto, Mayu Iwatani and Miho Wakizawa)	1	4	224
8	Baribari Bombers (Giulia, Mai Sakurai and Thekla)	1	3	221
9	Neo Genesis (Starlight Kid, AZM and Miyu Amasaki)	1	2	220
10	Threedom (Io Shirai, Kairi Hojo and Mayu Iwatani)	1	2	217
11	Oedo Tai (Momo Watanabe, Saki Kashima and Starlight Kid)	1	5	215
12	Candy Crush (Chelsea, Kairi Hojo and Koguma)	1	0	209
13	Cosmic Angels (Tam Nakano, Saori Anou and Natsupoi)	1	2	182
14	Chibis (Kairi Hojo, Kaori Yoneyama and Yuhi)	1	2	134
15	Heisei-gun (Io Shirai, Mayu Iwatani and Takumi Iroha)	1	1	128
16	Triangle of Madness † (Thekla, Julia Hart and Skye Blue)	1	2	127+
17	Empress Nexus Venus (Maika, Mina Shirakawa and Xena)	1	2	127
18	J.A.N. (Jungle Kyona, Kaori Yoneyama and Natsuko Tora)	1	2	126
18	Oedo Tai (Andras Miyagi, Kagetsu and Sumire Natsu)	1	1	126
20	Tomodachi Mania (Hatsuhinode Kamen, Kaori Yoneyama and Tsubasa Kuragaki)	1	0	119
21	Prominence (Hiragi Kurumi, Risa Sera and Suzu Suzuki)	1	2	115
21	Kawasaki Katsushika Saikyou Densetsu (Act Yasukawa, Natsuki☆Taiyo and Saki Kashima)	1	0	115
23	Oedo Tai (Hana Kimura, Kagetsu and Kyoko Kimura)	1	2	97
24	Queen's Quest (HZK, Io Shirai and Momo Watanabe)	1	0	92
25	Abarenbo GE (Syuri, Mirai and Ami Sohrei)	1	1	87
26	Team Hyper Destroyers (Evie, Hiroyo Matsumoto and Kellie Skater)	1	2	84
27	Queen's Quest (AZM, Momo Watanabe and Utami Hayashishita)	1	1	77
28	Team Jungle (Hiroyo Matsumoto, Jungle Kyona and Kaori Yoneyama)	1	0	57
29	Kimura Monster-gun (Alpha Female, The Female Predator Amazon and Kyoko Kimura)	1	0	55
30	Dream Trine (Ami Sohrei, Hina and Lady C)	1	2	53
31	Tokyo Cyber Squad (Hana Kimura, Jungle Kyona and Konami)	1	1	38
32	Queen's Quest (AZM, HZK and Io Shirai)	2	0	34
32	REStart (Kairi, Natsupoi and Saori Anou)	1	0	34
34	Oedo Tai (Bea Priestley, Natsuko Tora and Saki Kashima)	1	0	32
35	Hiromi Mimura, Kairi Hojo and Konami	1	1	29

=== By wrestler ===
Rank	Wrestler	No. of reigns	Combined defenses	Combined days
1	Mayu Iwatani	5	12	824
2	Io Shirai	6	6	747
3	Tam Nakano	4	14	728
4	Kaori Yoneyama (Note: During her fifth reign, Yoneyama wrestled under the gimmick of Fukigen Death.)	5	8	694
5	Maika	3	11	644
6	Kairi Hojo	5	5	623
7	Saki Kashima	5	10	617
8	Giulia	2	5	501
9	Natsupoi	3	9	453
10	Starlight Kid	2	7	435
11	Mina Shirakawa	2	9	418
12	HZK	4	3	402
13	Momo Watanabe	3	6	384
14	Syuri	2	3	367
15	Hiroyo Matsumoto	3	5	365
16	Thekla †	2	5	348+
17	AZM	4	3	329
18	Konami	3	6	325
19	Unagi Sayaka	1	7	291
20	Viper	1	3	276
21	Rina	1	4	258
22	Himeka	1	7	237
23	Miho Wakizawa	1	4	224
24	Kagetsu	2	3	223
25	Jungle Kyona	3	3	221
25	Mai Sakurai	1	3	221
27	Miyu Amasaki	1	2	220
28	Saori Anou	2	2	216
29	Chelsea	1	0	209
29	Koguma	1	0	209
31	Natsuko Tora	2	2	158
32	Kyoko Kimura	2	2	152
33	Ami Sohrei	2	3	140
34	Hana Kimura	2	3	135
35	Yuhi	1	2	134
36	Takumi Iroha	1	1	128
37	Julia Hart †	1	2	127+
37	Skye Blue †	1	2	127+
39	Xena	1	2	127
40	Andras Miyagi	1	1	126
40	Sumire Natsu	1	1	126
42	Hatsuhinode Kamen	1	0	119
42	Tsubasa Kuragaki	1	0	119
44	Hiragi Kurumi	1	2	115
44	Risa Sera	1	2	115
44	Suzu Suzuki	1	2	115
44	Act Yasukawa	1	0	115
44	Natsuki☆Taiyo	1	0	115
49	Mirai	1	1	87
50	Evie	1	1	84
50	Kellie Skater	1	1	84
52	Utami Hayashishita	1	1	77
53	Alpha Female	1	0	55
53	The Female Predator Amazon	1	0	55
55	Hina	1	2	53
55	Lady C	1	2	53
57	Bea Priestley	1	0	32
58	Hiromi Mimura	1	1	29
