= Hina (wrestler) =

Japanese professional wrestler

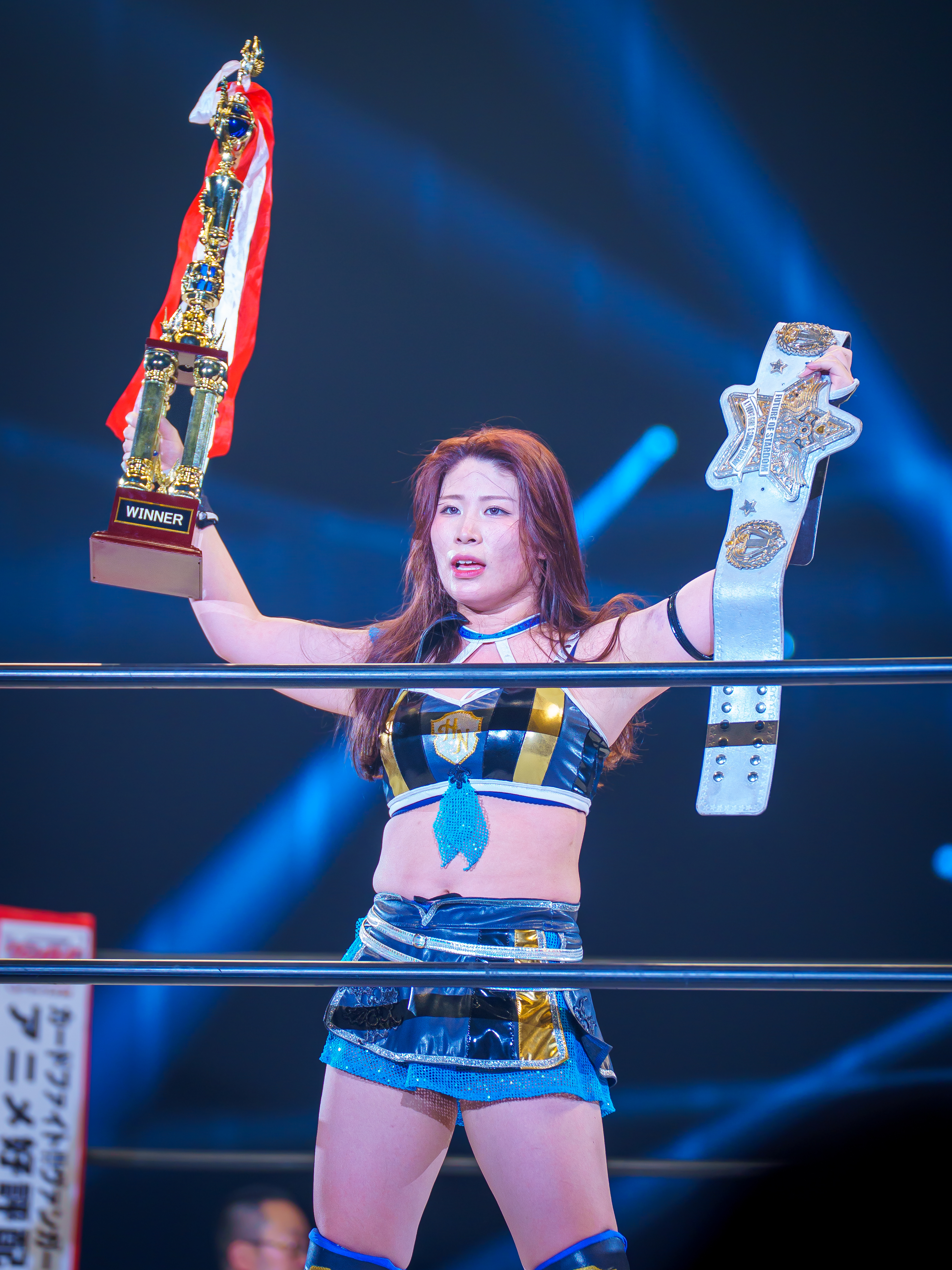
- Hina as the Future of Stardom Champion in April 2025

Personal information
- Born: December 28, 2006 (age 19) Shimotsuke, Tochigi, Japan
- Relatives: Hanan (sister); Rina (twin sister)

Professional wrestling career
- Ring names: Hina; Masyu Pinya; Pinya
- Billed height: 163 cm (5 ft 4 in)
- Billed weight: 52 kg (115 lb)
- Trained by: Hana Kimura
- Debut: June 11, 2017

Hina (妃南, Hina; born December 28, 2006) is a Japanese professional wrestler. She is signed to World Wonder Ring Stardom, where she is a member of God's Eye and a former Future of Stardom Champion.

== Professional wrestling career ==
=== World Wonder Ring Stardom (2017–present) ===
==== Early career (2017–2019) ====
Hina made her professional wrestling debut in World Wonder Ring Stardom under the ring name Hina, on the second night of the Shining Stars on June 11, 2017, where she teamed up with her twin sister Rina and fell short to Hanan in a 2-on-1 exhibition handicap match. At Mask Fiesta 2018 on October 28, 2018, Hina, under the ring name Pinya, teamed up with Nyanki and Rinya in a loss to Cello de la Bellano, Shiki Melody and Starlight Kid.

==== Queen's Quest (2019–2024) ====
At the 2019 Stardom Draft on April 14, 2019, Hina was drafted to Queen's Quest. At Mask Fiesta 2019 on October 27, Hina wrestled under the ring name Masyu Pinya alongside Cyber Cat in a 2-on-1 handicap loss to Trainee Miyagi.

On the first night of the 2021 5Star Grand Prix on July 31, 2021, the team of Hina, AZM, Hanan and Lady C lost to Oedo Tai (Saki Kashima, Konami, Rina and Ruaka) in an Eight-woman tag team match. Then Hina announced would take a break from professional wrestling to focus on her high school exams.

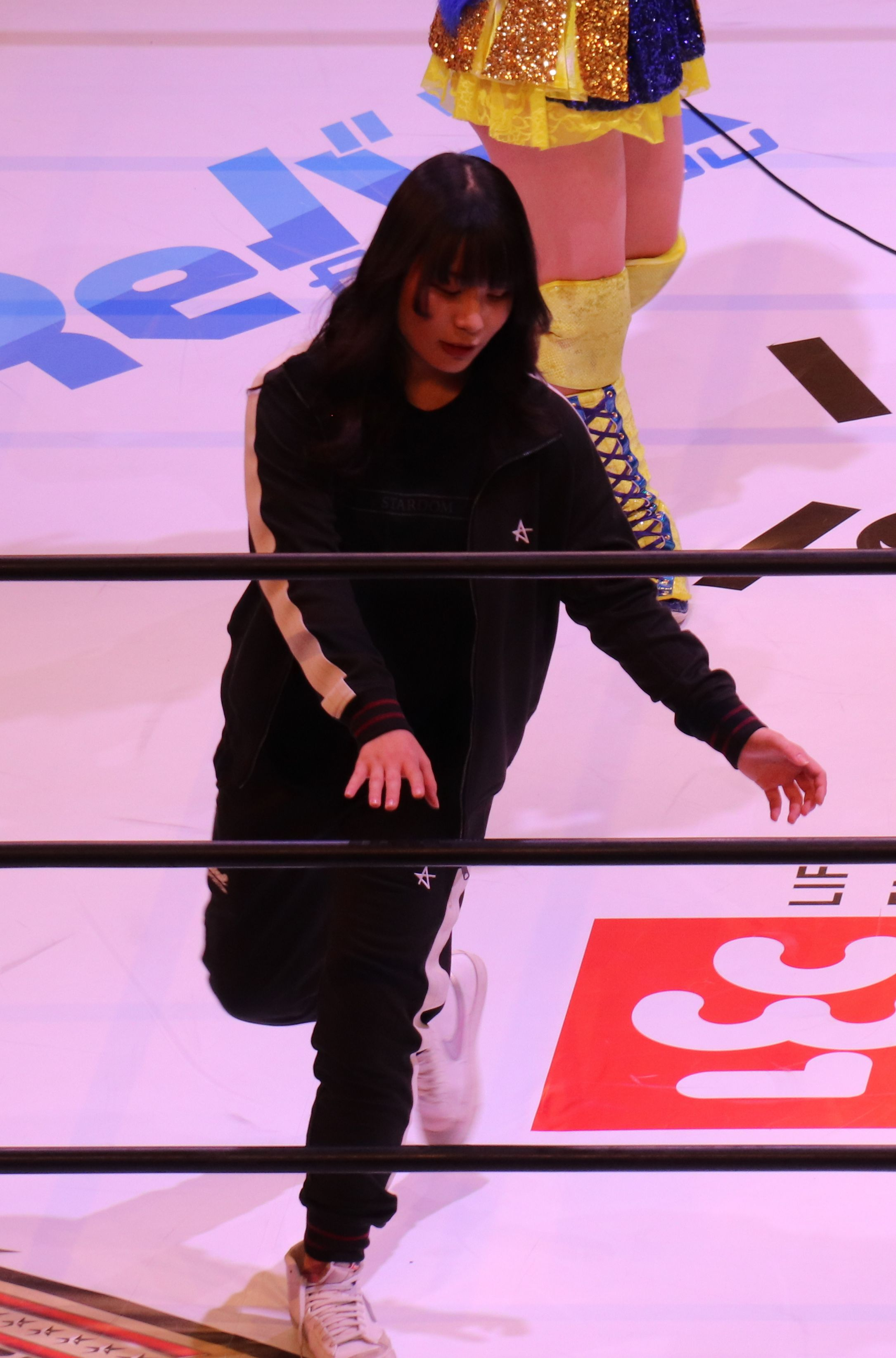
Hina in Stardom World Climax 2022

Hina made her return on the second night of the World Climax 2022 on March 27, 2022, where she challenged Hanan to a match for the Future of Stardom Championship. Hina competed in the 2022 Cinderella Tournament, in which she was eliminated in the first round by Unagi Sayaka.

== Personal life ==
Hina has two sisters; Rina is her twin sister and Hanan is their older sister. The sisters are professional wrestlers who compete in Stardom.

== Championships and accomplishments ==
- Pro Wrestling Illustrated
  - Ranked No. 93 of the top 250 female wrestlers in the PWI Women's 250 in 2025
- World Wonder Ring Stardom
  - Artist of Stardom Championship (1 time) - with Ami Sohrei and Lady C
  - Future of Stardom Championship (1 time)
  - 5★Star GP Award (1 times)
    - 5★Star GP Blue Stars Best Match Award (2026) vs. Hanako on August 2 in Blue Stars A
  - Stardom Year-End Award (1 times)
    - Best Unit Award (2023) – as a part of Queen's Quest
