= Saki Kashima =

Japanese professional wrestler

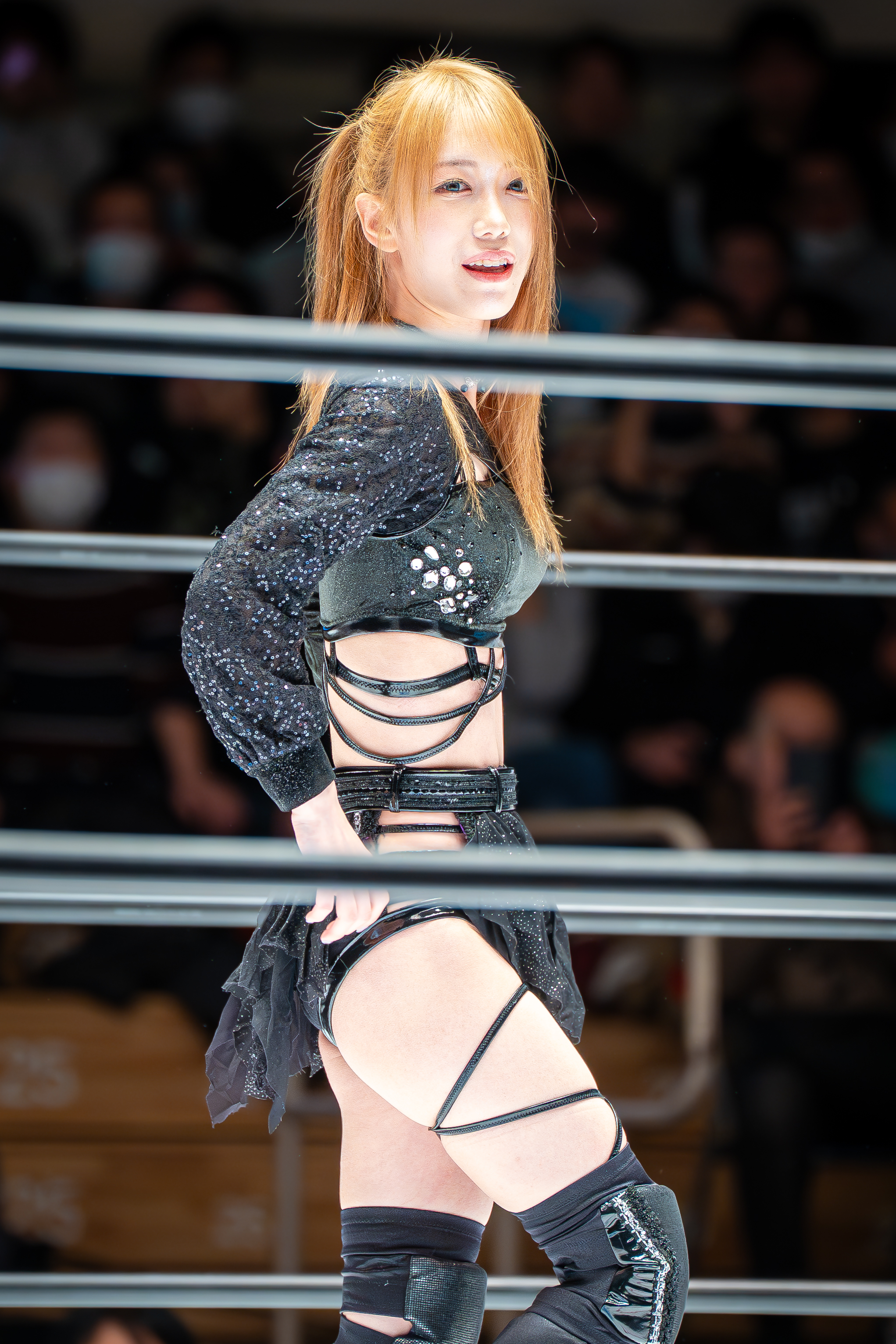
- Kashima in January 2025

Personal information
- Born: May 5, 1993 (age 33) Masuda, Shimane, Japan

Professional wrestling career
- Ring name(s): La Gatita; Saki Kashima
- Billed height: 163 cm (5 ft 4 in)
- Billed weight: 45 kg (99 lb)
- Trained by: Fuka; Ikuto Hidaka
- Debut: 2011
- Retired: April 26, 2026

Saki Kashima (鹿島沙希, Kashima Saki; born May 5, 1993) is a Japanese retired professional wrestler best known for her tenure with World Wonder Ring Stardom where she is a former five-time Artist of Stardom Champion, one-time Goddesses of Stardom Champion and a two-time High Speed Champion. Kashima was a member of three different stables: Stars, Oedo Tai and God's Eye.

== Professional wrestling career ==
=== World Wonder Ring Stardom (2011–2013) ===
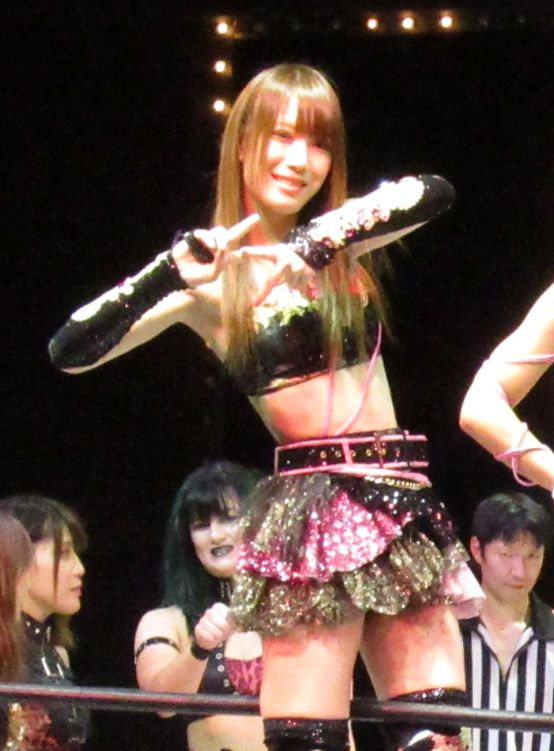
Kashima in December 2019

Kashima made her professional wrestling debut at World Wonder Ring Stardom's Stardom Season 2: Grow Up Stars show from June 12, 2011, where she fought Natsuki Taiyo in a three-minute exhibition match time-limit draw. At Stardom Season 10 New Year Stars 2013 on January 14, she teamed up with Act Yasukawa and Natsuki Taiyo and defeated Kellie Skater, Portia Perez and Tomoka Nakagawa to become the inaugural Artist of Stardom Champions. This would be her last match before a five-year hiatus from in-ring activity.

=== Tokyo Gurentai (2011, 2019) ===
Kashima worked a couple of matches for Tokyo Gurentai, one of them being at Tokyo Love II ~Another Chance~ from September 28, 2011, where she fell short to Io Shirai and Nanae Takahashi in a triple threat match. The other one took place eight years later, at Tokyo Gurentai Lucha Libre Fiesta, an event produced by Stardom in partnership with Tokyo Gurentai, where she participated in a four-way tag team elimination match, teaming up with Starlight Kid and Tam Nakano as Stars and going against Oedo Tai (Andras Miyagi, Hazuki and Kagetsu), JAN (Jungle Kyona, Natsuko Tora and Saya Iida), and Queen's Quest (AZM, Momo Watanabe and Utami Hayashishita).

=== Return to World Wonder Ring Stardom (2018–2026) ===
==== Stars (2018–2020) ====
A notable confrontation in which she was involved was at Stardom X Stardom 2018: Kagetsu 10th Anniversary Show from August 12, where she unsuccessfully challenged Momo Watanabe for the Wonder of Stardom Championship. At the Goddesses Of Stardom Tag League 2018 tournament, Kashima teamed up with Mayu Iwatani, placing themselves in the Block A and scoring a total of seven points. At Mask Fiesta 2018 on October 28, Kashima, under the ring name La Gatita, teamed up with Dame de Panko and Mayuchica to defeat Bear Dog, Black Jungle Fairy and Night Bear. She participated in the Goddesses Of Stardom Tag League 2019, teaming up with former STARS stablemate Mayu Iwatani, placing themselves in the Red Block, and scoring a total of two points. She participated in the 2020 edition of the Goddesses of Stardom Tag League, teaming up with Natsuko Tora under Oedo Tai's sub-group named Devil Duo, placing themselves in the Red Block and scoring a total of four points.

==== Oedo Tai (2020–2023) ====
At the 10th Anniversary of Stardom on March 3, 2021, Kashima teamed up with Natsuko Tora to unsuccessfully challenge Donna Del Mondo (Maika and Himeka) for the Goddesses of Stardom Championship. She was scheduled to face AZM in the first night of the Stardom Cinderella Tournament 2021 on April 10, but she was replaced by Rina. At Stardom 5 Star Grand Prix 2021 she fought in the "Red Stars" block where she scored a total of four points. At Stardom 10th Anniversary Grand Final Osaka Dream Cinderella on October 9, 2021, she unsuccessfiully challenged Syuri for the SWA World Championship.

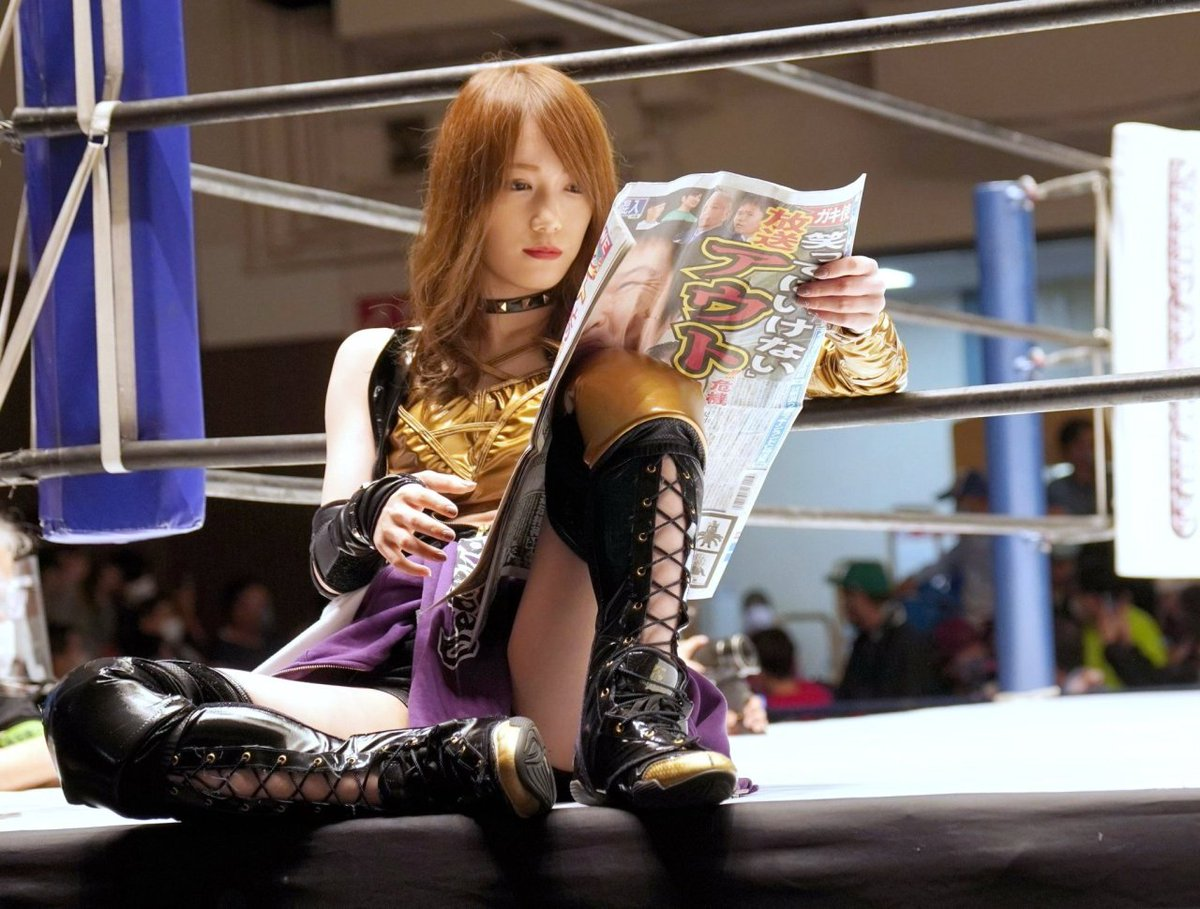
Kashima in November 2021

At Stardom Cinderella Journey on February 23, 2022, Kashima teamed up with Fukigen Death to unsuccessfully challenge FWC (Hazuki and Koguma) for the Goddesses of Stardom Championship. At Stardom Cinderella Tournament 2022, Kashima made it to the quarterfinals where she got defeated by Mirai on April 17. At Stardom Flashing Champions on May 28, 2022, Kashima alongside Starlight Kid and Momo Watanabe defeated MaiHimePoi (Maika, Himeka and Natsupoi) to win the Artist of Stardom Championship. At Stardom Fight in the Top, Kashima, Kid and Watanabe defended the artist titles against God's Eye (Syuri, Ami Sourei and Mirai), and Donna Del Mondo (Giulia, Maika and Mai Sakurai). At Mid Summer Champions in Osaka on July 24, she, Kid and Watanabe defended the artist titles against Giulia, Maika and Himeka. At Stardom 5 Star Grand Prix 2022, she fought in the "Red Stars" block where she scored a total of twelve points. At Stardom x Stardom: Nagoya Midsummer Encounter on August 21, 2022, she alongside Kid and Watanabe defended the artist titles against Cosmic Angels (Mina Shirakawa, Unagi Sayaka and Saki).

==== God's Eye (2023–2026) ====
On May 27, 2023, at Flashing Champions, Kashima defeated the High Speed Champion AZM to win the title first the first time in her career in a three-way match, which also involved Fukigen Death. At Stardom Sunshine 2023 on June 25, Kashima teamed up with Oedo Tai stablemates Natsuko Tora, Momo Watanabe, Starlight Kid, Ruaka and Rina and competed in a Loser leaves unit cage match against Queen's Quest (Lady C, Hina, Utami Hayashishita, Saya Kamitani, AZM and Miyu Amasaki). Kashima got eliminated last, as she was forced to withdraw her unit. Parting ways was hostile as Oedo Tai attacked her after the loss, after which determined AZM to offer Kashima a spot into Queen's Quest which the latter denied. At Stardom Mid Summer Champions 2023 on July 2, Kashima successfilly defended the High Speed Championship against her former "We Love Tokyo Sports!" tag partner Fukigen Death. After the match, Oedo Tai attacked Kashima again, but Syuri and Ami Sourei rescued her and offered a spot into God's Eye. At Nagoya Golden Fight 2023 on October 9, Kashima lost the High Speed Championship to Mei Seira.

On January 10, 2026, Kashima announced that she will be retiring from professional wrestling with her last match being on April 23, 2026, where she teamed with stablemate Syuri to defeat AZM and Momo Watanabe. Kashima's retirement ceremony took place three days later at Stardom All Star Grand Queendom 2026 to officially conclude her career.

== Championships and accomplishments ==
- Pro Wrestling Illustrated
  - Ranked No. 73 of the top 250 female singles wrestlers in the PWI Women's 250 in 2023
- World Wonder Ring Stardom
  - High Speed Championship (2 times)
  - Artist of Stardom Championship (5 times, inaugural) – with Act Yasukawa and Natsuki Taiyo (1), Bea Priestley and Natsuko Tora (1), Mayu Iwatani and Tam Nakano (2), Momo Watanabe and Starlight Kid (1)
  - Goddesses of Stardom Championship (1 time) – with Mayu Iwatani
  - Top Unit Trios Tournament (2021) – with Natsuko Tora and Ruaka
  - 5★Star GP Award (1 time)
    - 5★Star GP Outstanding Performance Award (2022)
  - Stardom Year-End Award (1 time)
    - Best Unit Award (2021) as part of Oedo Tai, shared with Momo Watanabe, Natsuko Tora, Rina, Ruaka and Starlight Kid
