= Rina (wrestler) =

Japanese professional wrestler (born 2006)

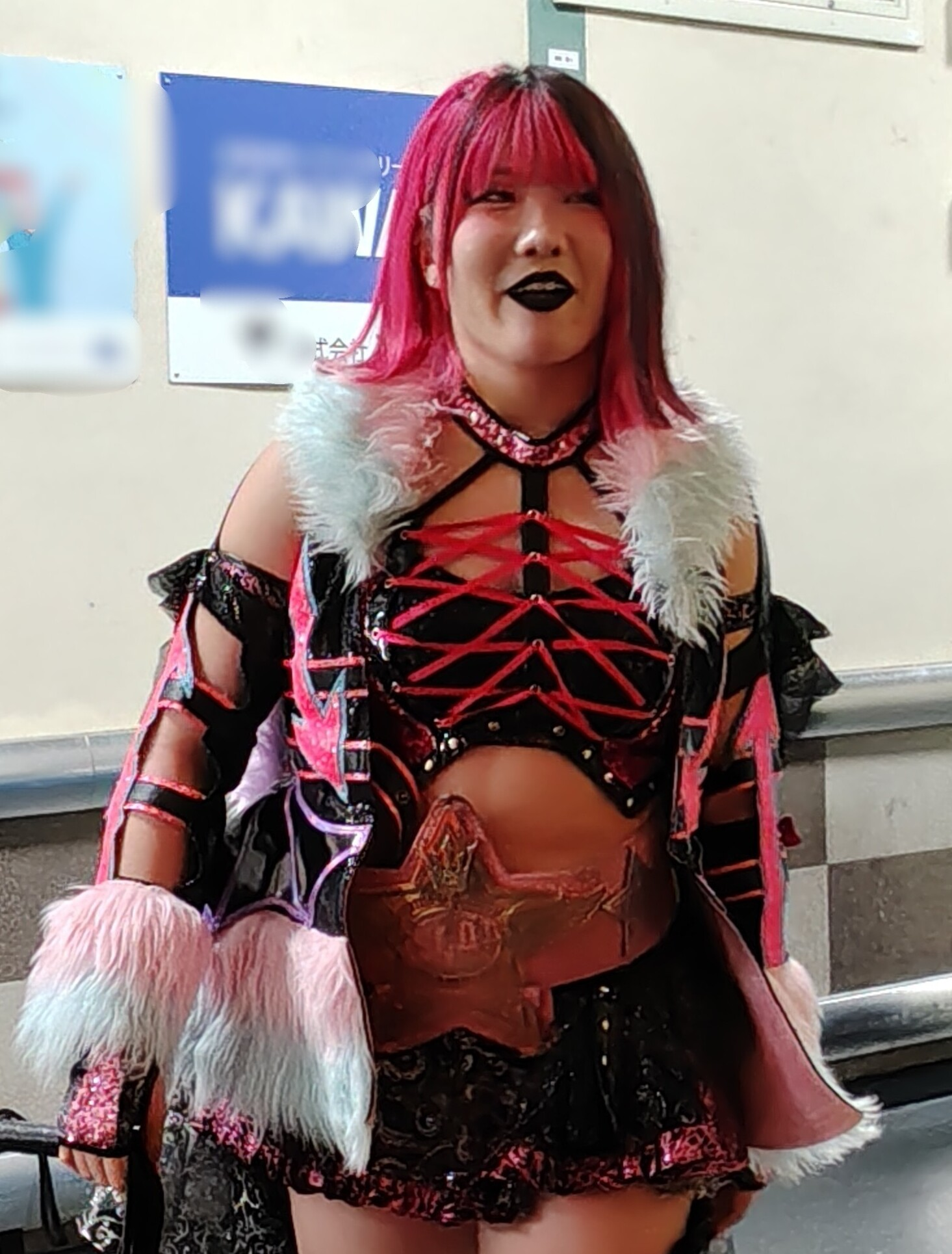
- Rina in May 2026 as one third of the Artist of Stardom Champions

Personal information
- Born: December 28, 2006 (age 19) Shimotsuke, Tochigi, Japan
- Relatives: Hanan (sister); Hina (twin sister)

Professional wrestling career
- Ring name(s): Big Match Rina; Cyber Cat; Rina; Rinya
- Billed height: 163 cm (5 ft 4 in)
- Billed weight: 53 kg (117 lb)
- Trained by: Hana Kimura
- Debut: June 11, 2017

Rina (吏南, Rina; born December 28, 2006) is a Japanese professional wrestler. She is signed to World Wonder Ring Stardom, where she is a member of H.A.T.E. and a former Future of Stardom Champion.

== Professional wrestling career ==
=== World Wonder Ring Stardom (2017–present) ===
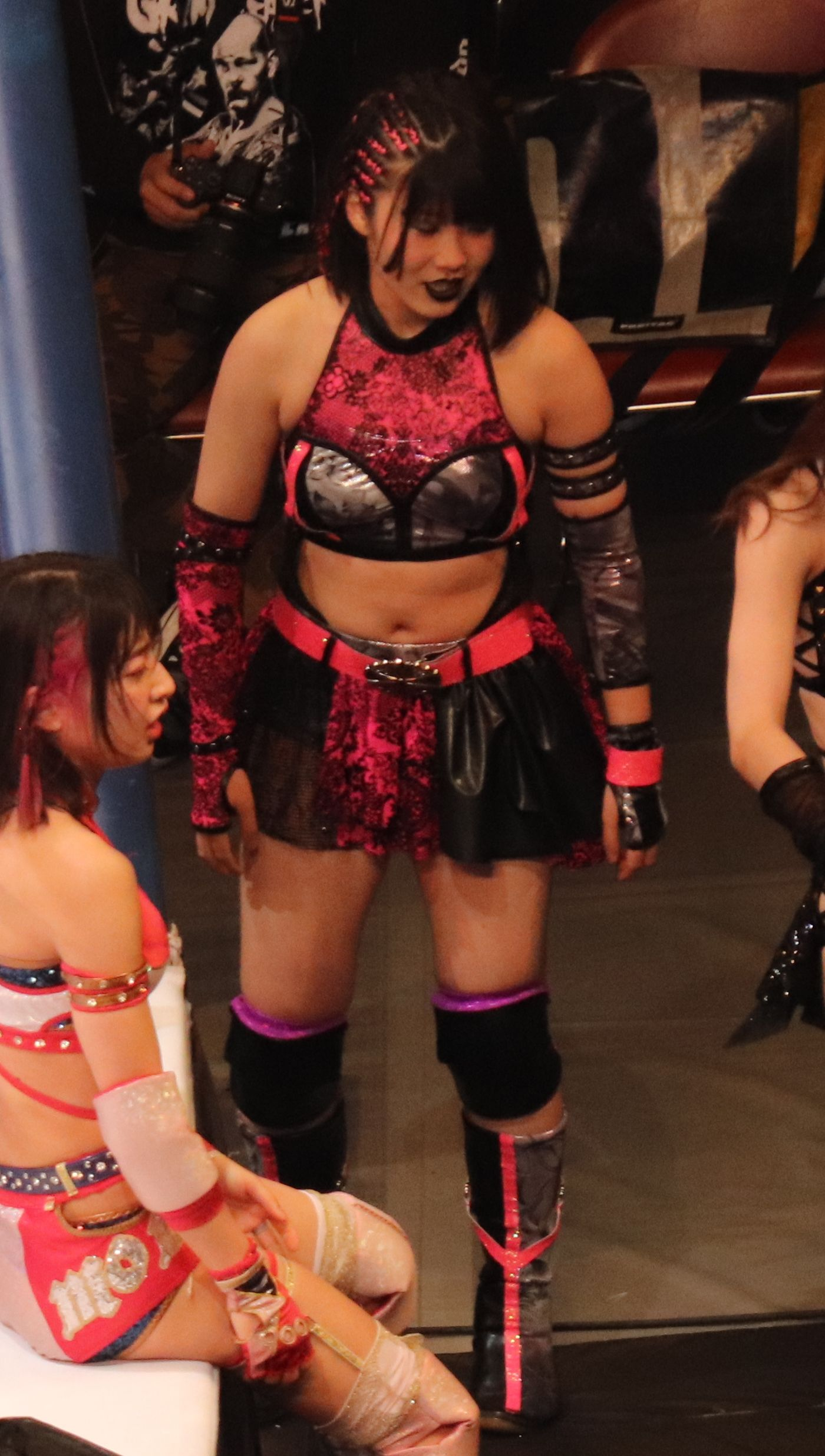
Rina in Stardom World Climax 2022

Rina made her professional wrestling debut under the ring name Rina at the early age of 11 in World Wonder Ring Stardom, on the second night of the Stardom Shining Stars from June 11, 2017, where she teamed up with her twin sister Hina and fell short to Hanan in a 2-on-1 exhibition handicap match. At Mask Fiesta 2018 on October 28, 2018, Rina, under the ring name Rinya, teamed up with Nyanki and Pinya in a loss to Cello de la Bellano, Shiki Melody and Starlight Kid.

At the 2019 Stardom Draft on April 14, 2019, Rina was drafted to the newly created International Army stable, later known as Tokyo Cyber Squad. At Mask Fiesta 2019 on October 27, Rina wrestled under the ring name Cyber Cat alongside Masyu Pinya in a 2-on-1 handicap loss to Trainee Miyagi.

At Stardom Yokohama Cinderella 2020 on October 3, 2020, Rina had to search for a new unit since Tokyo Cyber Squad disbanded after Oedo Tai's Natsuko Tora and Saki Kashima defeated Jungle Kyona and Konami in a Losing unit must disband match. She alongside Kyona, Ruaka and Death Yama-san received invitations for joining the Stars stable led by Mayu Iwatani which they accepted. Three weeks later however, on October 29, 2020, Rina would quit Stars to join Oedo Tai.

On the first night of the Stardom Cinderella Tournament 2021 from April 10, Rina replaced Saki Kashima in a first-round tournament match where she defeated AZM. She did not compete further in the tournament. At the 2021 edition of the Goddesses of Stardom Tag League, Rina teamed up with Hanan as "Water & Oil" and competed in the Red Goddess Block where they scored a total of two points.

At Stardom Cinderella Journey on February 23, 2022, Rina fell short to mai Sakurai and Waka Tsukiyama in a number one contender's match for the Future of Stardom Championship. On the first night of the Stardom World Climax 2022 from March 26, Rina unsuccessfully challenged Hanan for the Future of Stardom Championship. Rina took part in the Stardom Cinderella Tournament 2022, falling short to Saya Iida in the first-rounds from April 3, 2022. On May 12, 2023, at New Blood 8, Rina won her first championship by defeating Ami Sourei to win the Future of Stardom Championship.

== Personal life ==
Rina's sisters Hina (twin sister) and Hanan (older sister) are also professional wrestlers where they all perform in World Wonder Ring Stardom.

== Championships and accomplishments ==
- Pro Wrestling Illustrated
  - Ranked No. 58 of the top 250 female wrestlers in the PWI Women's 250 in 2024
- World Wonder Ring Stardom
  - Artist of Stardom Championship (1 time) – with Fukigen Death and Konami
  - Future of Stardom Championship (1 time)
  - New Blood Tag Team Championship (1 time) — with Azusa Inaba
  - 5★Star GP (2026)
  - 5★Star GP Award (5 times)
    - 5★Star GP Red Stars Best Match Award (2025) vs. Natsuko Tora on August 2 in Red Stars B
    - 5★Star GP Best Match Award (2025) vs. AZM on August 23
    - 5★Star GP Best Match Award (2026) vs. Konami on August 18
    - 5★Star GP Fighting Spirit Award (2025)
    - 5★Star GP Technique Award (2025)
  - Stardom Year-End Award (1 time)
    - Best Unit Award (2021) as part of Oedo Tai, shared with Momo Watanabe, Natsuko Tora, Ruaka, Saki Kashima and Starlight Kid
