= Stardom Dream Tag Festival =

2023 World Wonder Ring Stardom event

- Promotional poster of the event
- Promotion: World Wonder Ring Stardom
- Date: September 10, 2023
- City: Yokohama, Japan
- Venue: Yokohama Budokan
- Attendance: 1,479

Event chronology
← Previous; 5Star Special in Hiroshima	Next → New Blood 11

Stardom Dream Tag Festival (スターダム・ドリーム・タッグ・フェスティバル, Sutādamu Dorīmu Taggu Fesutibaru) was a professional wrestling event promoted by World Wonder Ring Stardom. The event took place on September 10, 2023, in Yokohama, Japan at the Yokohama Budokan.

== Production ==
=== Background ===
The show featured seven professional wrestling matches that result from scripted storylines, where wrestlers portray villains, heroes, or less distinguishable characters in the scripted events that build tension and culminate in a wrestling match or series of matches. The event's press conference took place on August 18, 2023, and was broadcast live on Stardom's YouTube channel. All the matches were established by a fan voting system, with the results giving the event's namesake of dream tag teams between wrestlers from enemy units who even feuded against each other at some points in time.

=== Events ===
The preshow match saw a gauntlet tag team match won by Megan Bayne and Mei Seira by last eliminating the team of Miyu Amasaki and Lady C. The bout was broadcast live on Stardom's YouTube channel.

In the first main card bout, Mina Shirakawa and Tam Nakano picked up a win over the time's Goddesses of Stardom Champions Natsupoi and Saori Anou. Next up, Kairi showed up to bid farewell to the Stardom fans, but was encountered by Saya Iida, Koguma and Hazuki who demanded one last match from her. Kairi picked Nanae Takahashi and Mayu Iwatani as her two tag team partners as the bout was officiated for Nagoya Golden Fight. Next up, Mai Sakurai and Wonder of Stardom Champion Mirai picked up a victory over Future of Stardom Champion Rina and Hina. Sakurai requested Mirai as her tag team partner in the Goddesses of Stardom Tag League which Mirai accepted. In the fourth bout, Hanan and Mariah May defeated Momo Watanabe and Momo Kohgo by disqualification after Watanabe attacked everyone including referee Barb Sasaki with a bat. Watanabe then challenged Mirai for the Wonder of Stardom Championship reminding that she defeated the latter in the Grand Prix earlier that month. Next up, former Oedo Tai partners Natsuko Tora and Hazuki defeated Nanae Takahashi and Ruaka. In the semi main event, Strong Women's Champion Giulia and Suzu Suzuki drew against Utami Hayashishita and Maika. After the bout concluded, Prominence's Risa Sera and Hiragi Kurumi attacked Giulia and Suzuki, announcing their participation into the Goddesses of Stardom Tag League.

In the main event, AZM and one half of the New Blood Tag Team Champions Starlight Kid picked up a win over the IWGP Women's Champion Mayu Iwatani and High Speed Champion Saki Kashima.

== Results ==
No.	Results	Stipulations	Times
1	Megan Bayne and Mei Seira won by last eliminating Queen's Quest (Miyu Amasaki and Lady C) (Note: The other participating teams were Stars (Saya Iida and Koguma), God's Eye (Syuri and Ami Sourei) and Waka Tsukiyama and Yuna Mizumori.)	Gauntlet tag team match	12:30
2	Dream H (Mina Shirakawa and Tam Nakano) defeated REStart (Natsupoi and Saori Anou)	Tag team match	12:32
3	Mai Sakurai and Mirai defeated Rina and Hina by submission	Tag team match	11:50
4	The Future (Hanan and Mariah May) defeated Team Peach (Momo Watanabe and Momo Kohgo) by disqualification	Tag team match	8:19
5	Natsuko Tora and Hazuki defeated Nanae Takahashi and Ruaka	Tag team match	14:56
6	Giulia and Suzu Suzuki vs. Utami Hayashishita and Maika ended in a time-limit draw	Tag team match	20:00
7	AZM and Starlight Kid defeated Mayu Iwatani and Saki Kashima	Tag team match	15:24
