= Stardom 5Star Special in Hiroshima =

2023 World Wonder Ring Stardom event

- Promotional poster of the event featuring Giulia, Risa Sera, Natsupoi, Saori Anou, Suzu Suzuki and Mei Seira
- Promotion: World Wonder Ring Stardom
- Date: September 3, 2023
- City: Hiroshima, Japan
- Venue: Hiroshima Sun Plaza
- Attendance: 825

Event chronology
← Previous; Midsummer Festival	Next → Dream Tag Festival

Stardom 5Star Special in Hiroshima (スターダム 5スタースペシャル in 広島, Sutādamu 5 sutāsupesharu in Hiroshima) was a professional wrestling event promoted by World Wonder Ring Stardom. The event took place on September 3, 2023, in Hiroshima, Japan at the Hiroshima Sun Plaza. It was a pay-per-view held amidst the 2023 edition of the 5 Star Grand Prix tournament, serving as one of the major evenings besides the inaugural night and the finals night.

Nine matches were contested at the event, including two on the pre-show, and four of Stardom's ten championships were on the line. In the main event, Giulia defeated Risa Sera to retain the Strong Women's Championship.

== Production ==
=== Background ===
The show featured nine professional wrestling matches that result from scripted storylines, where wrestlers portray villains, heroes, or less distinguishable characters in the scripted events that build tension and culminate in a wrestling match or series of matches. The event's press conference took place on August 18, 2023, and was broadcast live on Stardom's YouTube channel.

=== Event ===
The preshow matches were broadcast live on Stardom's YouTube channel. In the first one, Ami Sourei, Yuna Mizumori and one third of the Artist of Stardom Champions Thekla picked up a victory over Lady C, AZM and Miyu Amasaki in six-woman tag team action. In the second one, Megan Bayne and Donna Del Mondo's Maika defeated Mina Shirakawa and Mariah May.

In the first main card event, Utami Hayashishita defeated Momo Watanabe in a five star grand prix match. Same did Tam Nakano against Oedo Tai's Starlight Kid in the fifth bout and God's Eye's leader Syuri against the time's IWGP Women's Champion Mayu Iwatani. In the sixth bout, Saki Kashima defended the High Speed Championship for the third time consecutive in that respective reign against Momo Kohgo. In the seventh bout, Natsupoi and Saori Anou successfully retained the Goddesses of Stardom Championship for the first time in that respective reign against Suzu Suzuki and Mei Seira. After the match, Saki Kashima came down to the ring to officially accept Seira's challenge for the High Speed title the latter issued a couple of weeks prior to the event. Utami Hayashishita and AZM also came down to challenge Anou and Natsupoi for the tag titles. In the semi main event, Mirai defeated a briefly returning Konami to secure the first defense of the Wonder of Stardom Championship in that respective reign. After the bout concluded, Mina Shirakawa came down to challenge Syuri to a UWF rules match which was scheduled to take place at Nagoya Golden Fight on October 9, 2023.

In the main event, Giulia defeated Prominence's leader Risa Sera to secure the third consecutive defense of the Strong Women's Championship in that respective reign.

== Results ==
No.	Results	Stipulations	Times
1^{P}	Ami Sourei, Yuna Mizumori and Thekla defeated Queen's Quest (Lady C and 02 line (AZM and Miyu Amasaki))	Six-woman tag team match	6:32
2^{P}	Megan Bayne and Maika defeated Rose Gold (Mina Shirakawa and Mariah May)	Tag team match	7:41
3	Utami Hayashishita defeated Momo Watanabe	5 Star Grand Prix tournament match	9:26
4	Tam Nakano defeated Starlight Kid	5 Star Grand Prix tournament match	8:28
5	Syuri defeated Mayu Iwatani	5 Star Grand Prix tournament match	12:30
6	Saki Kashima (c) defeated Momo Kohgo	Singles match for the High Speed Championship	4:43
7	REStart (Natsupoi and Saori Anou) (c) defeated Suzu Suzuki and Mei Seira	Tag team match for the Goddesses of Stardom Championship	13:43
8	Mirai (c) defeated Konami	Singles match for the Wonder of Stardom Championship	12:52
9	Giulia (c) defeated Risa Sera	Singles match for the Strong Women's Championship	17:37
(c) / – the champion(s) heading into the match; P / – the match was broadcast on the pre-show
