= Stardom Gold Rush 2023 =

2023 World Wonder Ring Stardom event

Gold Rush 2023
- Promotional poster of the event featuring Mirai, Saori Anou, Momoka Hanazono and Mei Seira
- Promotion: World Wonder Ring Stardom
- Date: November 18, 2023
- City: Osaka, Japan
- Venue: Edion Arena Osaka
- Attendance: 1,033

Event chronology
← Previous; New Blood West 1	Next → Nagoya Big Winter

Gold Rush chronology
← Previous; 2022	Next → —

Stardom Gold Rush 2023 (スターダムゴールドラッシュ2023, Sutādamugōrudorasshu 2023) was a professional wrestling event promoted by World Wonder Ring Stardom. It took place on November 18, 2023, in Osaka, Japan, at the Edion Arena Osaka.

Eight matches were contested at the event, including two on the pre-show, and three of Stardom's ten championships were on the line. The main event saw the Baribari Bombers (Giulia, Thekla and Mai Sakurai) defeat Stars (Hazuki, Hanan and Saya Iida) in a six-woman tag team Tables, Ladders, and Chairs Moneyball tournament final for the Artist of Stardom Championship.

== Production ==
=== Background ===
The show featured eight professional wrestling matches that result from scripted storylines, where wrestlers portray villains, heroes, or less distinguishable characters in the scripted events that build tension and culminate in a wrestling match or series of matches.

Tam Nakano was scheduled to defend the World of Stardom Championship against Suzu Suzuki but pulled out due to injury on November 6. Suzuki instead faced AZM and the returning Starlight Kid in a Three-way match.

=== Event ===
The event started with two preshow matches broadcast live on Stardom's YouTube channel. In the first bout, Kaori Yoneyama who wrestled as "Billiken Death", her Gold Rush pay-per-view gimmick which resembles the real life counterpart of charm doll Billiken last eliminated Queen's Quest's Miyu Amasaki to win the traditional Biliken battle royal. In the second bout, Hazuki, Hanan and Saya Iida picked up a victory over Konami, Ami Sourei and Hanako in the semifinals of the moneyball tournament.

In the first main card bout, Giulia, Thekla and Mai Sakurai defeated Natsuko Tora, Momo Watanabe and Ruaka in the second moneyball tournament semifinal. Next up, Mei Seira defeated Momoka Hanazono to secure the first defense of the High Speed Championship in that respective reign. In the fifth bout, AZM defeated Suzu Suzuki and a returning Starlight Kid in a three-way match. After the bout concluded, AZM challenged Giulia to a match for the Strong Women's Championship. Next, Syuri defeated Aliss Ink who wrestled under the name of Scandinavian Hurricane via technical knockout in a UWF Rules match. In the semi main event, Mirai went into a time-limit draw against Saori Anou in a match for the Wonder of Stardom Championship. The draw granted Mirai the successful defense, the third consecutive one in that respective reign.

In the main event, Giulia, Thekla and Mai Sakurai defeated Hazuki, Hanan and Saya Iida to win the moneyball tournament in a bout which was also disputed for the Artist of Stardom Championship, where the Donna Del Mondo sub-group secured the third defense of the titles in that respective reign. After the bout concluded, Thekla issued a challenge for Mei Seira's High Speed Championship. The match was scheduled to take place at Nagoya Big Winter on December 2, 2023.

== Results ==
No.	Results	Stipulations	Times
1^{P}	Billiken Death won by last eliminating Miyu Amasaki (Note: The other entrants were Megan Bayne, Maika, Mina Shirakawa, Yuna Mizumori and Lady C.)	Biliken battle royal	14:44
2^{P}	Stars (Hazuki, Hanan and Saya Iida) defeated God's Eye (Konami, Ami Sourei) and Hanako	Six-woman tag team Moneyball tournament semifinal	10:32
3	Baribari Bombers (Giulia, Thekla and Mai Sakurai) defeated Oedo Tai (Natsuko Tora, Momo Watanabe and Ruaka)	Six-woman tag team Moneyball tournament semifinal	9:28
4	Mei Seira (c) defeated Momoka Hanazono	Singles match for the High Speed Championship	7:18
5	AZM defeated Suzu Suzuki and Starlight Kid	Three-way match	10:15
6	Syuri defeated Scandinavian Hurricane by TKO	UWF Rules match	10:15
7	Mirai (c) vs. Saori Anou ended in a time-limit draw	Singles match for the Wonder of Stardom Championship	30:00
8	Baribari Bombers (Giulia, Thekla and Mai Sakurai) (c) defeated Stars (Hazuki, Hanan and Saya Iida)	Six-woman tag team Tables, Ladders, and Chairs Moneyball tournament finals for the Artist of Stardom Championship	10:27
(c) / – the champion(s) heading into the match; P / – the match was broadcast on the pre-show
