= Stardom Midsummer Festival =

2023 World Wonder Ring Stardom event

- Promotional poster of the event featuring various competitors
- Promotion: World Wonder Ring Stardom
- Date: August 19, 2023
- City: Tokyo, Japan
- Venue: Ota City General Gymnasium
- Attendance: 1,653

Event chronology
← Previous; New Blood 10	Next → 5Star Special in Hiroshima

Stardom Midsummer Festival (スターダム真夏の祭典, Sutādamu manatsu no saiten) was a professional wrestling event promoted by World Wonder Ring Stardom. The event took place on August 19, 2023, in Tokyo, Japan at the Ota City General Gymnasium. The event saw various legends and veterans from the Japanese independent scene competing alongside Stardom wrestlers.

Eight matches were contested at the event, including two on the pre-show. The main event saw Jaguar Yokota and NanaMomo (Momoe Nakanishi and Nanae Takahashi) defeat Black Desire (Momo Watanabe and Starlight Kid) and Yuu.

== Production ==
=== Background ===
The show featured eight professional wrestling matches that result from scripted storylines, where wrestlers portray villains, heroes, or less distinguishable characters in the scripted events that build tension and culminate in a wrestling match or series of matches. The event's press conference took place on July 25, 2023, and was broadcast live on Stardom's YouTube channel.

=== Event ===
The event started with two preshow matches. In the first one, Mei Seira defeated Hanako and Fukigen Death in three-way action. In the second one, Hanan, Hina and Rina defeated Waka Tsukiyama, Lady C and Yuna Mizumori in six-woman tag team action. The two bouts were broadcast live on Stardom's YouTube channel.

In the first main card bout, Mariah May and Mina Shirakawa picked up a win over Megan Bayne and on third of the time's Artist of Stardom Champions Thekla. Next up, Maika and Suzu Suzuki defeated Saya Iida and Ami Sourei. In the fifth match, the time's IWGP Women's Champion Mayu Iwatani and Koguma defeated Syuri and High Speed Champion Saki Kashima. In the sixth bout, All Japan Women's Pro Wrestling legends Dump Matsumoto and Zap teamed up with Natsuko Tora and Ruaka to defeat Queen's Quest's Utami Hayashishita, AZM and Miyu Amasaki, and Diana's Kyoko Inoue. In the semi main event, time's Goddesses of Stardom Champions Natsupoi and Saori Anou and World of Stardom Champion Tam Nakano defeated Ladies Legend Pro-Wrestling veteran Shinobu Kandori, Takako Inoue and Hazuki.

In the main event, NanaMomo teammates Momoe Nakanishi and Nanae Takahashi reunited their team to tag up with veteran Jaguar Yokota to defeat Momo Watanabe, Starlight Kid and Yuu.

== Results ==
No.	Results	Stipulations	Times
1^{P}	Mei Seira defeated Hanako and Fukigen Death	Three-way match	4:58
2^{P}	Hanan, Hina and Rina defeated Waka Tsukiyama, Lady C and Yuna Mizumori	Six-woman tag team match	7:04
3	Rose Gold (Mariah May and Mina Shirakawa) defeated Megan Bayne and Thekla	Tag team match	7:06
4	Maika and Suzu Suzuki defeated Saya Iida and Ami Sourei	Tag team match	9:17
5	Stars (Mayu Iwatani and Koguma) defeated God's Eye (Syuri and Saki Kashima) by submission	Tag team match	9:31
6	Vulgar Alliance (Dump Matsumoto, Zap) and BMI2000 (Natsuko Tora and Ruaka) defeated Queen's Quest (Utami Hayashishita and 02line (AZM and Miyu Amasaki)) and Kyoko Inoue	Eight-woman tag team match	13:41
7	Cosmic Angels (Tam Nakano, Natsupoi and Saori Anou) defeated Shinobu Kandori, Takako Inoue and Hazuki	Six-woman tag team match	16:04
8	Jaguar Yokota and NanaMomo (Momoe Nakanishi and Nanae Takahashi) defeated Black Desire (Momo Watanabe and Starlight Kid) and Yuu	Six-woman tag team match	27:01
P / – the match was broadcast on the pre-show
