= Stardom Nagoya Big Winter =

2023 World Wonder Ring Stardom event

Nagoya Big Winter
- Promotional poster of the event featuring Utami Hayashishita, Mirai, Momo Watanabe and Maika
- Promotion: World Wonder Ring Stardom
- Date: December 2, 2023
- City: Nagoya, Japan
- Venue: Aichi Prefectural Gymnasium
- Attendance: 952

Event chronology
← Previous; Gold Rush 2023	Next → New Blood 12

Stardom Nagoya Big Winter (スターダム名古屋ビッグウィンター, Sutādamu Nagoya bigguu~intā) was a professional wrestling event promoted by World Wonder Ring Stardom. It took place on December 2, 2023, in Nagoya, Japan, at the Aichi Prefectural Gymnasium.

Nine matches were contested at the event, including two on the pre-show, and three of Stardom's ten championships were on the line. The main event saw Suzu Suzuki defeat Hazuki to challenge Maika for the vacant World of Stardom Championship at Dream Queendom 3.

== Production ==
=== Background ===
The show featured nine professional wrestling matches that result from scripted storylines, where wrestlers portray villains, heroes, or less distinguishable characters in the scripted events that build tension and culminate in a wrestling match or series of matches.

=== Storylines ===
The event's press conference was broadcast live on Stardom's YouTube channel on November 20, 2023. Besides the matches scheduled for the pay-per-view, it was announced that Tam Nakano would relinquish the World of Stardom Championship due to lingering injuries. A tournament was announced to take place on November 28, 2023, whose winner would face Grand Prix rightful challenger Suzu Suzuki for the vacant "red belt" at Dream Queendom 3 on December 29, 2023. Mina Shirakawa, Momo Watanabe, Ami Sourei and Maika were announced as the participants. Natsupoi also announced that she would give up her half of the Goddess of Stardom Championship due to injuries. Saori Anou had to vacate her part subsequently, therefore the both championships were declared vacant. A tournament for the secondary contender team was announced to take place November 28, 2023, whose winner would face Tag League winners and rightful challengers Maika and Megan Bayne for the vacant titles on the night of the event.

=== Event ===
The event started with two confrontations broadcast live on Stardom's YouTube channel. In the first one, Miyu Amasaki and Hanako defeated Mina Shirakawa and Yuzuki in tag team action, and in the second one, Donna Del Mondo's Mai Sakurai defeated Ruaka in singles competition.

In the first main card bout, Saori Anou and Yuna Mizumori defeated New Blood Tag Team Champions Hanan and Saya Iida. Next up, Mei Seira defeated Thekla to secure the second consecutive defense of the High Speed Championship in that respective reign. Next up, Natsuko Tora, Starlight Kid and Momo Watanabe picked up a win over Syuri, Ami Sourei and Mirai. After the bout concluded, Saori Anou demanded another challenge for Mirai's Wonder of Stardom Championship following their time-limit draw bout from Gold Rush the previous month. The rematch was scheduled to take place at Queendom 3 on December 29, 2023. In the sixth bout, Nanae Takahashi defeated Aliss Ink in an UWF Rules match. Next up, one third of the Artist of Stardom Champions Giulia defeated AZM to secure the sixth consecutive defense of the Strong Women's Championship in that respective reign. In the semi main event, Utami Hayashishita and Saya Kamitani defeated Maika and Megan Bayne to win the vacant Goddess of Stardom Championship. Kamitani and Hayashishita became the second team to win the titles on two separate occasions. After the bout concluded, they received a challenge from Momo Watanabe and Natsuko Tora for the titles in what was scheduled to take place at Dream Queendom 3.

In the main event, Grand Prix winner Suzu Suzuki defeated Hazuki to remain the rightful challenger for the World of Stardom Championship at Dream Queendom 3, where she was scheduled to face Maika for the vacant title.

== Results ==
No.	Results	Stipulations	Times
1^{P}	Miyu Amasaki and Hanako defeated Mina Shirakawa and Yuzuki	Tag team match	8:24
2^{P}	Mai Sakurai defeated Ruaka	Singles match	5:27
3	Cosmic Angels (Saori Anou and Yuna Mizumori) defeated wing★gori (Hanan and Saya Iida)	Tag team match	7:06
4	Mei Seira (c) defeated Thekla	Singles match for the High Speed Championship	8:05
5	Oedo Tai (Natsuko Tora, Starlight Kid and Momo Watanabe) defeated Abarenbo GE (Syuri, Mirai and Ami Sourei)	Six-woman tag team match	9:09
6	Nanae Takahashi defeated Scandinavian Hurricane by technical knockout	UWF Rules match	7:21
7	Giulia (c) defeated AZM	Singles match for the Strong Women's Championship	12:56
8	AphrOditE (Utami Hayashishita and Saya Kamitani) defeated Divine Kingdom (Maika and Megan Bayne)	Tag team match for the vacant Goddess of Stardom Championship	13:08
9	Suzu Suzuki defeated Hazuki	Singles match to determine who will challenge Maika for the World of Stardom Championship shot at Dream Queendom 3	14:16
(c) / – the champion(s) heading into the match; P / – the match was broadcast on the pre-show
