= Stardom x Stardom: Osaka Summer Team =

2023 World Wonder Ring Stardom event

- Promotional poster of the event featuring Tam Nakano, Mayu Iwatani, Utami Hayashishita and Megan Bayne
- Promotion: World Wonder Ring Stardom
- Date: August 13, 2023
- City: Osaka, Japan
- Venue: Edion Arena Osaka
- Attendance: 1,796

Event chronology
← Previous; 5 Star Grand Prix 2023	Next → New Blood 10

Stardom x Stardom chronology
← Previous; Nagoya Midsummer Encounter	Next → —

Stardom x Stardom: Osaka Summer Team (スターダム×スターダム 大阪夏の陣, Sutādamu × sutādamu ōsakanatsunojin) was a professional wrestling event promoted by World Wonder Ring Stardom. The event took place on August 13, 2023, in Osaka, Japan, at the Edion Arena Osaka.

Seven matches were contested at the event, including one on the pre-show, and five of Stardom's ten championships were on the line. The main event saw Tam Nakano defeat Megan Bayne to retain the World of Stardom Championship.

== Production ==
=== Background ===
The show featured seven professional wrestling matches that result from scripted storylines, where wrestlers portray villains, heroes, or less distinguishable characters in the scripted events that build tension and culminate in a wrestling match or series of matches. The event's press conference took place on July 25, 2023, and was broadcast live on Stardom's YouTube channel.

=== Event ===
The preshow match was broadcast on Stardom's YouTube channel. It featured a Gauntlet tag team match won by Suzu Suzuki and Mei Seira which last eliminated Maika and Thekla for the win.

The first main card bout saw Starlight Kid defeating Natsuko Tora in a 5 Star Grand Prix group stage match. Next up, Saki Kashima defeated Koguma to secure the second defense of the High Speed Championship in that respective reign. After the match she received a challenge from Mei Seira. The fourth bout of the event portraited the confrontation between Club Venus' Mariah May and Mina Shirakawa, and Natsupoi and Saori Anou for the Goddesses of Stardom Championship. Anou and Natsupoi won the titles, ending the defending team's reign at 49 days and one successful defense. After the match ended, the new champion team received a challenge from Suzu Suzuki and Mei Seira. Next up, Giulia defeated Yuu to retain the Strong Women's Championship for the second time consecutively in that respective reign. After the bout ended, Giulia received a challenge via video from Impact Wrestling's Deonna Purrazzo and Gisele Shaw for a title match which was scheduled to take place at Multiverse United 2 on August 20, 2023. In the semi main event, Mayu Iwatani defeated Utami Hayashishita to secure the first defense of the IWGP Women's Championship in that respective reign.

The main event saw Tam Nakano defeating Megan Bayne to secure the second consecutive defense of the World of Stardom Championship in that respective reign.

== Results ==
No.	Results	Stipulations	Times
1^{P}	Suzu Suzuki and Mei Seira won by last eliminating Donna Del Mondo (Maika and Thekla) (Note: The other participating teams were Classmates (Hazuki and Saya Iida), Oedo Tai (Momo Watanabe and Rina), 02line (AZM and Miyu Amasaki), Yuna Mizumori and Momoka Hanazono, Waka Tsukiyama and Billiken Death, Hanan and Hina, Syuri and Hanako, and Abarenbo GE (Mirai and Ami Sourei).)	Gauntlet tag team match	22:30
2	Starlight Kid defeated Natsuko Tora	5 Star Grand Prix tournament match	7:31
3	Saki Kashima (c) defeated Koguma	Singles match for the High Speed Championship	4:53
4	REStart (Natsupoi and Saori Anou) defeated Rose Gold (Mariah May and Mina Shirakawa) (c)	Tag team match for the Goddesses of Stardom Championship	13:24
5	Giulia (c) defeated Yuu	Singles match for the Strong Women's Championship	19:01
6	Mayu Iwatani (c) defeated Utami Hayashishita	Singles match for the IWGP Women's Championship	21:32
7	Tam Nakano (c) defeated Megan Bayne	Singles match for the World of Stardom Championship	16:32
(c) / – the champion(s) heading into the match; P / – the match was broadcast on the pre-show
