= Stardom Nagoya Golden Fight 2023 =

2023 World Wonder Ring Stardom event

- Promotional art work of the event
- Promotion: World Wonder Ring Stardom
- Date: October 9, 2023
- City: Nagoya, Japan
- Venue: Aichi Prefectural Gymnasium
- Attendance: 1,315
- Tagline: Kinshachi Miracle

Event chronology
← Previous; New Blood 11	Next → Halloween Dark Night

Nagoya Golden Fight chronology
← Previous; First	Next → 2024

Stardom Nagoya Golden Fight 2023 (スターダム名古屋ゴールデンファイト2023, Sutādamu Nagoya gōrudenfaito 2023) was a professional wrestling event promoted by World Wonder Ring Stardom. The event took place on October 9, 2023, in Nagoya, Japan at the Aichi Prefectural Gymnasium.

Eight matches were contested at the event, including two on the pre-show, and four of Stardom's ten championships were on the line. The main event saw Tam Nakano defeat Natsuko Tora to retain the World of Stardom Championship.

== Production ==
=== Background ===
The show featured eight professional wrestling matches that result from scripted storylines, where wrestlers portray villains, heroes, or less distinguishable characters in the scripted events that build tension and culminate in a wrestling match or series of matches. The event's press conference took place on September 12, 2023, and was broadcast live on Stardom's YouTube channel.

=== Event ===
The event started with the preshow confrontation between the teams of Ami Sourei, Lady C and Hanan, and Miyu Amasaki, Yuna Mizumori and Ruaka, and was broadcast live on Stardom's YouTube channel. Sourei scored the pin for her team's victory. In the second preshow bout, Mei Seira defeated Saki Kashima to win the High Speed Championship for the first time in her career, ending Kashima's reign on her fourth defense.

The first main card bout saw one half of the Goddesses of Stardom Champions Saori Anou defeating AZM in what was dubbed as a 5Star Special singles match. In the fourth match, God's Eye's leader Syuri defeated Club Venus leader Mina Shirakawa by way of knockout in a UWF Rules match after Syuri was leading at a (3–2) point score. After the bout concluded, a video of Shirakawa getting attacked by a masked silhouette was shown and Dump Matsumoto was revealed to be the attacker. A potential future confrontation between them was hinted for Halloween Dark Night for October 29, 2023. In the fifth bout, Giulia, Thekla and Mai Sakurai defeated Megan Bayne, Maika and Suzu Suzuki to retain the Artist of Stardom Championship for the second time in that respective reign. After the bout concluded, Maika attacked Suzuki as she reminisced the tensions between them following the finals of the 2023 Grand Prix where Maika ended the competition as a runner up, spilling her frustrations over Suzuki who came out champion. Giulia tried to stop Maika but the latter walked out of the arena leaving her Donna Del Mondo stablemates behind. In the sixth bout, Mirai defeated Momo Watanabe to retain the Wonder of Stardom Championship for the second time consecutively in that reign. In the semi main event, Kairi, Nanae Takahashi and IWGP Women's Champion Mayu Iwatani defeated Hazuki, Koguma and Saya Iida in which was Kairi's last match in Stardom before pursuing her second stint with WWE.

In the main event, Tam Nakano defeated Natsuko Tora to retain the World of Stardom Championship for the third time consecutively in that respective reign. After the bout concluded, Suzu Suzuki the 2023 Grand Prix Winner came down to remind Nakano of her number one contendership for the red belt and about their match which was scheduled for Halloween Dark Night on October 29, 2023. Nakano sustained an ankle injury during her match with Natsuko Tora resulting in her having to vacate the Wonder of Stardom Championship on November 20, 2023.

== Results ==
No.	Results	Stipulations	Times
1^{P}	Ami Sourei defeated Lady C, Hanan, Miyu Amasaki, Yuna Mizumori, and Ruaka by pinfall	Six-way match	6:28
2^{P}	Mei Seira defeated Saki Kashima (c) by pinfall	Singles match for the High Speed Championship	6:28
3	Saori Anou defeated AZM by pinfall (Note: The bout was initially scheduled as a Goddesses of Stardom Championship match in which Anou and Natsupoi were supposed to defend the titles against AZM and Utami Hayashishita. However, both Natsupoi and Hayashishita pulled out due to cervical hernia injuries.)	Singles match	8:38
4	Syuri defeated Mina Shirakawa by technical knockout	UWF Rules match	10:45
5	Baribari Bombers (Thekla, Mai Sakurai and Giulia) (c) defeated Maika, Megan Bayne and Suzu Suzuki by pinfall	Six-woman tag team match for the Artist of Stardom Championship	5:37
6	Mirai (c) defeated Momo Watanabe by pinfall	Singles match for the Wonder of Stardom Championship	15:32
7	Nanae Takahashi, Mayu Iwatani, and Kairi defeated Classmates (Koguma, Hazuki, and Saya Iida) by pinfall	Six-woman tag team match This was Kairi's last Stardom match before departure.	24:25
8	Tam Nakano (c) defeated Natsuko Tora by pinfall	Singles match for the World of Stardom Championship	21:34
(c) / – the champion(s) heading into the match; P / – the match was broadcast on the pre-show
