= Stardom New Blood 10 =

2023 World Wonder Ring Stardom event

New Blood 10
- Promotion: World Wonder Ring Stardom
- Date: August 18, 2023
- City: Tokyo, Japan
- Venue: Shinagawa Intercity Hall
- Attendance: 361

Event chronology
← Previous; Stardom x Stardom: Osaka Summer Team	Next → Midsummer Festival

New Blood chronology
← Previous; New Blood 9	Next → New Blood 11

Stardom New Blood 10 (スターダムニューブラッド10, Sutādamunyūburaddo 10) was a professional wrestling event promoted by World Wonder Ring Stardom. The event took place on August 18, 2023, in Tokyo, Japan, at the Shinagawa Intercity Hall and later aired as a VOD show.

Seven matches were contested at the event. The main event saw Rina defeat Waka Tsukiyama to retain the Future of Stardom Championship.

== Production ==
=== Background ===
"New Blood" is a series of events that mainly focus on matches where rookie wrestlers, usually with three or fewer years of in-ring experience, evolve. Besides wrestlers from Stardom, various superstars from multiple promotions of the Japanese independent scene are invited to compete in bouts that are usually going under the stipulation of singles or tag team matches.

The show featured seven professional wrestling matches that result from scripted storylines, where wrestlers portray villains, heroes, or less distinguishable characters in the scripted events that build tension and culminate in a wrestling match or series of matches. The event's press conference took place on July 25, 2023, and was broadcast live on Stardom's YouTube channel.

=== Event ===
The show started with the singles confrontation between Lady C and Kohaku solded with the victory of the latter. Next up, Hanako and Pro Wrestling Wave's Kizuna Tanaka and Honoka picked up a victory over Ami Sourei and Diana's Nanami and Miran in a Six-woman tag team match. The third bout saw Suzu Suzuki and Mei Seira defeating Hanan and Hina in tag team action. In the fourth bout, Natsupoi defeated Yuna Mizumori in an evaluation match. Since Mizumori lost, she was declared as failed and next one to step up to furtherly test her was Cosmic Angels' unit leader Tam Nakano who challenged her to a match scheduled to take place at New Blood 11. Next up, Saori Anou defeated Miyu Amasaki in singles competition. The semi main event saw Nanae Takahashi picking up a victory over Stars' Saya Iida in a Passion injection match. After the bout concluded, Mei Seira stepped up to request a passion match which Takahashi accepted.

In the main event, Rina defeated Waka Tsukiyama to secure the second consecutive defense of the Future of Stardom Championship in that respective reign.

== Results ==
No.	Results	Stipulations	Times
1	Kohaku defeated Lady C	Singles match	7:47
2	Hanako, Kizuna Tanaka and Honoka defeated God's Eye (Ami Sourei, Nanami) and Miran	Six-woman tag team match	7:28
3	Suzu Suzuki and Mei Seira defeated Hanan and Hina	Tag team match	7:24
4	Natsupoi defeated Yuna Mizumori	Singles match	9:27
5	Saori Anou defeated Miyu Amasaki	Singles match	11:25
6	Nanae Takahashi defeated Saya Iida	Passion injection match	14:02
7	Rina (c) defeated Waka Tsukiyama	Singles match for the Future of Stardom Championship	14:23
(c) / – the champion(s) heading into the match
