= Stardom 5 Star Grand Prix 2023 =

2023 World Wonder Ring Stardom wrestling event

- Promotional poster

Tournament information
- Sport: Professional wrestling
- Location: Japan
- Dates: July 23, 2023–September 30, 2023
- Tournament format: Two-block round-robin
- Host: World Wonder Ring Stardom
- Participants: 20

Final positions
- Champions: Suzu Suzuki
- Runner-up: Maika

Tournament statistics
- Matches played: 73

Stardom 5 Star Grand Prix 2023 (スターダム5スターグランプリ2023, Sutādamu 5 sutāguranpuri 2023), often stylized as 5★Star GP 2023 was the twelfth annual professional wrestling tournament under the Stardom 5Star Grand Prix Tournament branch promoted by the Japanese promotion World Wonder Ring Stardom. It took between July 23 and September 30, 2023.

== Tournament history ==
The Stardom 5 Star Grand Prix is a professional wrestling tournament held each summer by Stardom. Similar to Bushiroad-owned male counterpart New Japan Pro-Wrestling with the G1 Climax tournament, it is currently held as a round-robin tournament with wrestlers split into two pools. The winner of each pool will compete in the final to decide the winner. As is the case with G1 Climax, a win is two points and a draw is one point for each wrestler.

=== Storylines ===
The event featured professional wrestling matches that resulted from scripted storylines, where wrestlers portrayed villains, heroes, or less distinguishable characters in the scripted events that built tension and culminated in a wrestling match or series of matches.

== Participants ==
Stardom announced the official participants of the two blocks on June 25, 2023.

=== Qualifiers ===
Due to the downsizing of the tournament, the 2023 edition featured a total of twenty competitors from which eighteen were directly announced. Both final two vacant spots were furtherly decided. They were contested in a rumble match which took place on June 18, 2023, and was won by Mariah May and Hanan. The bout also involved Koguma, Momo Kohgo, Hina, Saya Iida, Miyu Amasaki, Mai Sakurai, Thekla, Saki Kashima, Fukigen Death, Ruaka, Waka Tsukiyama, Yuna Mizumori, Hanako and Sakura Aya.

*Noted underneath are the champions who held their titles at the time of the tournament. The titleholders or even the number of contestants can change over time.

Wrestler	Unit	Notes
Ami Sourei	God's Eye	
AZM	Queen's Quest	
Giulia	Donna Del Mondo	Artist of Stardom Champion; Strong Women's Championship
Hanan	Stars	Hanan was one of the final two competitors in the 5-Star rumble match.
Hazuki	Stars	
Maika	Donna Del Mondo	
Mariah May	Club Venus	Goddesses of Stardom Champion; May was one of the final two competitors in the 5-Star rumble match. Lost the title after the tournament started.
Mayu Iwatani	Stars	IWGP Women's Champion
Mina Shirakawa	Club Venus	Goddesses of Stardom Champion; Lost the title after the tournament started.
Mirai	God's Eye	Wonder of Stardom Champion
Momo Watanabe	Oedo Tai	
Natsuko Tora	Oedo Tai	
Natsupoi	Cosmic Angels	Goddesses of Stardom Champion; Won the title after the tournament started.
Saori Anou	Cosmic Angels	Goddesses of Stardom Champion; Won the title after the tournament started.
Saya Kamitani	Queen's Quest	Saya withdrew from the tournament after suffering a dislocated elbow in her tournament match with Tam Nakano.
Starlight Kid	Oedo Tai	New Blood Tag Team Champion
Suzu Suzuki	Unaffiliated	Winner
Syuri	God's Eye	
Tam Nakano	Cosmic Angels	World of Stardom Champion
Utami Hayashishita	Queen's Quest	

== Results ==
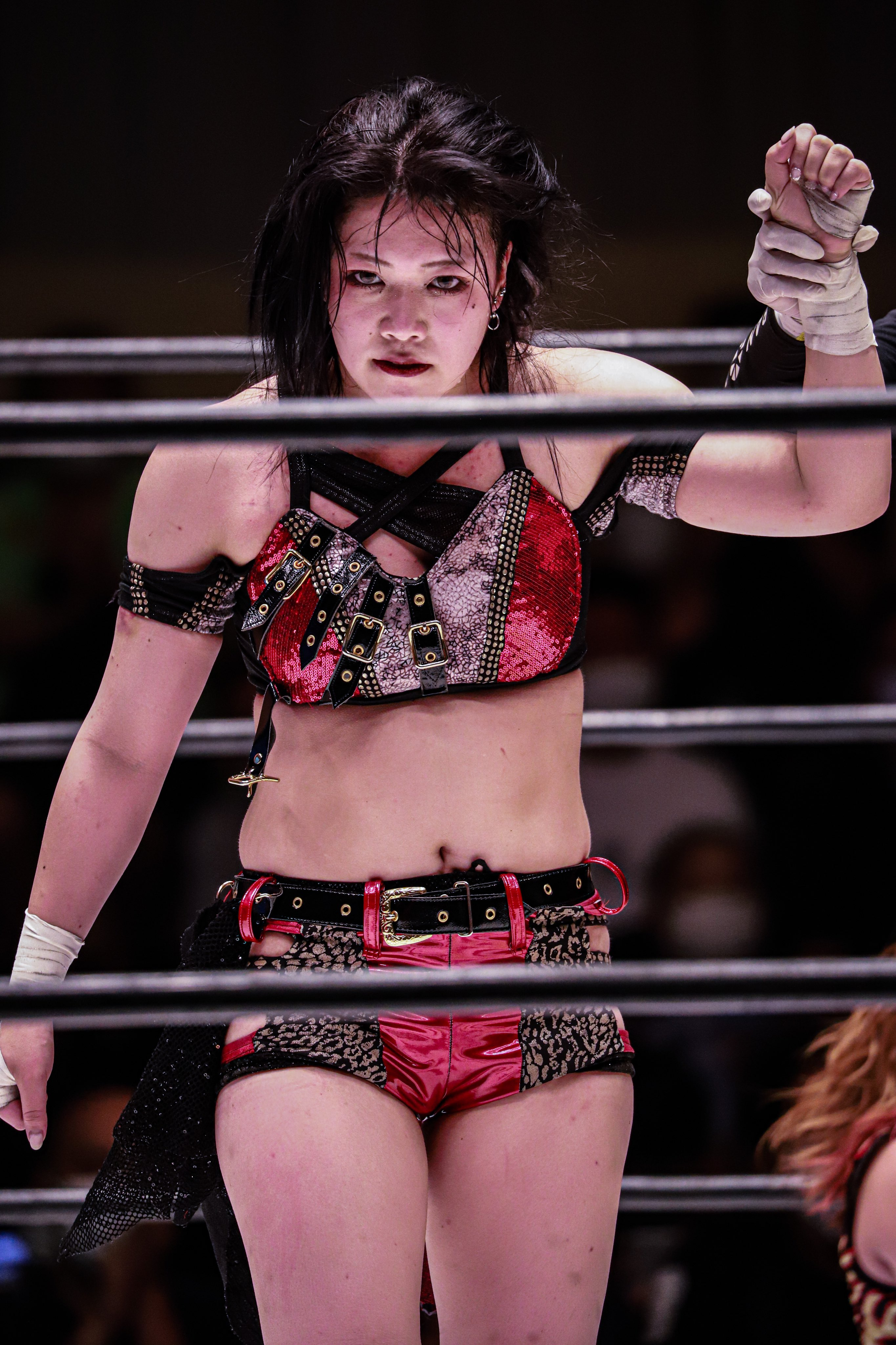
The winner of the 2023 5 Star Grand Prix, Suzu Suzuki.

=== Overview ===
Final standings
Red Stars		Blue Stars	
Suzu Suzuki	12	Maika	12
Natsuko Tora	12	Giulia	11
Tam Nakano	11	Momo Watanabe	10
Syuri	11	Saori Anou	10
Mayu Iwatani	11	Mirai	10
Natsupoi	11	Mina Shirakawa	9
Hazuki	10	Utami Hayashishita (Note: Hayashishita sustained an injury somewhere between September 18 and 20, therefore had to withdraw from the rest of the competition.)	8
Ami Sourei	8	AZM	8
Starlight Kid	4	Mariah May	6
Saya Kamitani (Note: Kamitani sustained an elbow injury on the first night of the tournament from July 23, therefore had to withdraw from the rest of the competition.)	0	Hanan	6

Tournament overview
Red Stars	Sourei	Tora	Hazuki	Natsupoi	Kid	Suzuki	Syuri	Kamitani	Iwatani	Nakano
Sourei	—N/a	Tora (4:48)	Hazuki (14:02)	Sourei (10:04)	Sourei (11:56)	Suzuki (11:29)	Sourei (9:14)	Sourei w/o	Iwatani (10:32)	Nakano (10:02)
Tora	Tora (4:48)	—N/a	Hazuki (9:41)	Tora (12:24)	Kid (7:31)	Suzuki (8:11)	Tora (12:59)	Tora w/o	Tora (13:07)	Tora (11:16)
Hazuki	Hazuki (14:02)	Hazuki (9:41)	—N/a	Hazuki (12:29)	Hazuki (10:19)	Suzuki (11:35)	Syuri (11:39)	Hazuki w/o	Iwatani (13:20)	Nakano (12:35)
Natsupoi	Sourei (10:04)	Tora (12:24)	Hazuki (12:29)	—N/a	Natsupoi (7:23)	Natsupoi (9:06)	Draw (15:00)	Natsupoi w/o	Natsupoi (11:08)	Natsupoi (10:54)
Kid	Sourei (11:56)	Kid (7:31)	Hazuki (10:19)	Natsupoi (7:23)	—N/a	Suzuki (12:26)	Syuri (10:56)	Kid w/o	Iwatani w/o	Nakano (8:28)
Suzuki	Suzuki (11:29)	Suzuki (8:11)	Suzuki (11:35)	Natsupoi (9:06)	Suzuki (12:26)	—N/a	Syuri (11:20)	Suzuki w/o	Iwatani (12:51)	Suzuki (13:24)
Syuri	Sourei (9:14)	Tora (12:59)	Syuri (11:39)	Draw (15:00)	Syuri (10:56)	Syuri (11:20)	—N/a	Syuri w/o	Syuri (12:30)	Nakano (13:20)
Kamitani	Sourei w/o	Tora w/o	Hazuki w/o	Natsupoi w/o	Kid w/o	Suzuki w/o	Syuri w/o	—N/a	Iwatani w/o	Nakano (8:15)
Iwatani	Iwatani (10:32)	Tora (13:07)	Iwatani (13:20)	Natsupoi (11:08)	Iwatani w/o	Iwatani (12:51)	Syuri (12:30)	Iwatani w/o	—N/a	Draw (15:00)
Nakano	Nakano (10:02)	Tora (11:16)	Nakano (12:35)	Natsupoi (10:54)	Nakano (8:28)	Suzuki (13:24)	Nakano (13:20)	Nakano (8:15)	Draw (15:00)	—N/a
Blue Stars	Hayashishita	Hanan	May	Giulia	Shirakawa	AZM	Mirai	Watanabe	Anou	Maika
Hayashishita	—N/a	Hanan w/o	Hayashishita (9:41)	Giulia w/o	Hayashishita (12:48)	AZM (10:10)	Mirai w/o	Hayashishita (9:26)	Hayashishita (13:06)	Maika (13:50)
Hanan	Hanan w/o	—N/a	Hanan (8:47)	Giulia (7:59)	Shirakawa (10:15)	Hanan (11:02)	Mirai (9:04)	Watanabe (10:52)	Anou (7:09)	Maika (3:50)
May	Hayashishita (9:41)	Hanan (8:47)	—N/a	Giulia (12:04)	May (11:47)	May (6:51)	Mirai (12:53)	May (11:53)	Anou (9:22)	Maika (8:55)
Giulia	Giulia w/o	Giulia (7:59)	Giulia (12:04)	—N/a	Shirakawa (12:33)	AZM (0:55)	Mirai (12:17)	Giulia (10:28)	Draw (15:00)	Giulia (12:12)
Shirakawa	Hayashishita (12:48)	Shirakawa (10:15)	May (11:47)	Shirakawa (12:33)	—N/a	AZM (10:53)	Shirakawa (14:47)	Shirakawa (14:07)	Anou (11:07)	Draw (15:00)
AZM	AZM (10:10)	Hanan (11:02)	May (6:51)	AZM (0:55)	AZM (10:53)	—N/a	Mirai (7:55)	Watanabe (8:13)	AZM (8:18)	Maika (8:43)
Mirai	Mirai w/o	Mirai (9:04)	Mirai (12:53)	Mirai (12:17)	Shirakawa (14:47)	Mirai (7:55)	—N/a	Watanabe (9:56)	Anou (12:42)	Maika (11:00)
Watanabe	Hayashishita (9:26)	Watanabe (10:52)	May (11:53)	Giulia (10:28)	Shirakawa (14:07)	Watanabe (8:13)	Watanabe (9:56)	—N/a	Watanabe (9:20)	Watanabe (10:02)
Anou	Hayashishita (13:06)	Anou (7:09)	Anou (9:22)	Draw (15:00)	Anou (11:07)	AZM (8:18)	Anou (12:42)	Watanabe (9:20)	—N/a	Draw (15:00)
Maika	Maika (13:50)	Maika (3:50)	Maika (8:55)	Giulia (12:12)	Draw (15:00)	Maika (8:43)	Maika (11:00)	Watanabe (10:02)	Draw (15:00)	—N/a

Final; September 30
Red	Suzu Suzuki	Pin
Blue	Maika	14:03

=== Night 1 ===
The first night took place on July 23, 2023.

No.	Results	Stipulations	Times
1^{P}	Baribari Bombers (Mai Sakurai and Thekla) and Mei Seira defeated Stars (Momo Kohgo and Classmates Koguma and Saya Iida)) and Saki Kashima, Yuna Mizumori and Hanako	Gauntlet tag team match	9:45
2^{P}	Maika defeated Hanan	5 Star Grand Prix tournament match	3:50
3	Mariah May defeated AZM	5 Star Grand Prix tournament match	6:51
4	Natsuko Tora defeated Ami Sourei	5 Star Grand Prix tournament match	4:48
5	Natsupoi defeated Starlight Kid	5 Star Grand Prix tournament match	7:23
6	Utami Hayashishita defeated Mina Shirakawa	5 Star Grand Prix tournament match	12:48
7	Momo Watanabe defeated Mirai	5 Star Grand Prix tournament match	9:56
8	Syuri defeated Suzu Suzuki	5 Star Grand Prix tournament match	11:20
9	Mayu Iwatani defeated Hazuki	5 Star Grand Prix tournament match	13:20
10	Giulia vs. Saori Anou ended in a time-limit draw	5 Star Grand Prix tournament match	15:00
11	Tam Nakano defeated Saya Kamitani by referee stoppage	5 Star Grand Prix tournament match	8:15
P / – the match was broadcast on the pre-show

=== Night 2 ===
The second night took place on July 29, 2023.

No.	Results	Stipulations	Times
1	Thekla defeated Hanako	Singles match	5:17
2	Queen's Quest (AZM and Hina) defeated YoungOED (Ruaka and Rina)	Tag team match	7:28
3	Queen's Quest (Utami Hayashishita and Miyu Amasaki) defeated Stars (Hazuki and Momo Kohgo)	Tag team match	7:20
4	God's Eye (Syuri and Saki Kashima) defeated Cosmic Angels (Natsupoi and Yuna Mizumori)	Tag team match	6:10
5	Megan Bayne, Suzu Suzuki and Mei Seira defeated Stars (Mayu Iwatani and Classmates (Koguma and Saya Iida))	Six-woman tag team match	10:17
6	Giulia defeated Hanan	5 Star Grand Prix tournament match	7:59
7	Saori Anou defeated Mariah May	5 Star Grand Prix tournament match	9:22
8	Mina Shirakawa defeated Mirai	5 Star Grand Prix tournament match	14:47

=== Night 3 ===
The third night took place on July 30, 2023.

No.	Results	Stipulations	Times
1	Natsuko Tora defeated Saya Kamitani by forfeit	5 Star Grand Prix tournament match	—
2	BMI2000 (Natsuko Tora and Ruaka) defeated Queen's Quest (Miyu Amasaki and Hina)	Tag team match	7:41
3	Mafia Bella (Giulia and Thekla) defeated Cosmic Angels (Tam Nakano and Yuna Mizumori)	Tag team match	8:50
4	Rose Gold (Mariah May and Mina Shirakawa) defeated Stars (Hazuki and Momo Kohgo)	Tag team match	8:19
5	Stars (Mayu Iwatani and Classmates (Koguma and Saya Iida)) defeated Queen's Quest (Utami Hayashishita, AZM and Lady C)	Six-woman tag team match	12:31
6	Megan Bayne, Suzu Suzuki and Mei Seira defeated God's Eye (Syuri, Saki Kashima) and Hanako	Six-woman tag team match	10:42
7	Mirai defeated Hanan	5 Star Grand Prix tournament match	9:04
8	Natsupoi defeated Suzu Suzuki	5 Star Grand Prix tournament match	9:06

=== Night 4 ===
The fourth night took place on August 5, 2023.

No.	Results	Stipulations	Times
1	Saya Iida defeated Hanako	Singles match	6:49
2	Oedo Tai (Natsuko Tora, Momo Watanabe and Rina) defeated Queen's Quest (Lady C, Miyu Amasaki and Hina)	Six-woman tag team match	9:44
3	God's Eye (Saki Kashima and Abarenbo GE Syuri and Ami Sourei)) defeated Stars (Hazuki and H&M's (Mayu Iwatani and Hanan))	Six-woman tag team match	9:52
4	Megan Bayne and Mei Seira defeated Mafia Bella (Giulia and Thekla) and Rose Gold (Mariah May and Mina Shirakawa)	Three-way tag team match	13:09
5	Mirai defeated AZM	5 Star Grand Prix tournament match	7:55
6	Suzu Suzuki defeated Starlight Kid	5 Star Grand Prix tournament match	12:26
7	Maika vs. Saori Anou ended in a time-limit draw	5 Star Grand Prix tournament match	15:00

=== Night 5 ===
The fifth night took place on August 6, 2023.

No.	Results	Stipulations	Times
1	Mafia Bella (Giulia and Thekla) defeated Oedo Tai (Momo Watanabe and Rina)	Tag team match	7:10
2	Stars (Mayu Iwatani and Classmates (Koguma and Saya Iida)) defeated Queen's Quest (Lady C, Miyu Amasaki and Hina)	Six-woman tag team match	8:57
3	Megan Bayne and Mariah May defeated Cosmic Angels (Natsupoi and Yuna Mizumori)	Tag team match	10:06
4	Maika, Suzu Suzuki and Mei Seira defeated God's Eye (Saki Kashima and Abarenbo GE (Mirai and Ami Sourei))	Six-woman tag team match	9:37
5	Mina Shirakawa defeated Hanan	5 Star Grand Prix tournament match	10:15
6	AZM defeated Saori Anou	5 Star Grand Prix tournament match	8:18
7	Natsuko Tora defeated Syuri	5 Star Grand Prix tournament match	12:59
8	Tam Nakano defeated Hazuki	5 Star Grand Prix tournament match	12:35

=== Night 6 ===
The sixth night took place on August 8, 2023.

No.	Results	Stipulations	Times
1	God's Eye (Saki Kashima and Abarenbo GE (Mirai and Ami Sourei)) defeated Queen's Quest (Lady C and Hina) and Hanako	Six-woman tag team match	10:36
2	Cosmic Angels (Tam Nakano and Yuna Mizumori) defeated Oedo Tai (Natsuko Tora and Rina) and Stars (Saya Iida and Momo Kohgo)	Three-way tag team match	7:56
3	02line (AZM and Miyu Amasaki) defeated Club Venus (Mina Shirakawa and Waka Tsukiyama)	Tag team match	9:24
4	Megan Bayne, Thekla and Mei Seira defeated Stars (FWC (Koguma and Hazuki) and Hanan)	Six-woman tag team match	9:03
5	Momo Watanabe defeated Maika	5 Star Grand Prix tournament match	10:02
6	Giulia defeated Mariah May	5 Star Grand Prix tournament match	12:04
7	Syuri vs. Natsupoi ended in a time-limit draw	5 Star Grand Prix tournament match	15:00
8	Mayu Iwatani defeated Suzu Suzuki	5 Star Grand Prix tournament match	12:51

=== Night 7 ===
The seventh night took place on August 10, 2023.

No.	Results	Stipulations	Times
1	Ami Sourei defeated Saya Kamitani by forfeit	5 Star Grand Prix tournament match	—
2	Megan Bayne & Mei Seira defeated Hanako & Hina and Oedo Tai (Momo Watanabe & Rina)	Three-way tag team match	8:03
3	Club Venus (Mariah May, Mina Shirakawa & Waka Tsukiyama) defeated Queen's Quest (AZM, Miyu Amasaki & Utami Hayashishita)	Six-woman tag team match	9:13
4	Cosmic Angels (Saori Anou, Tam Nakano & Yuna Mizumori) defeated Donna del Mondo (Giulia, Maika & Thekla)	Six-woman tag team match	9:43
5	Stars (Hanan, Hazuki, Koguma, Momo Kohgo & Saya Iida) defeated God's Eye (Ami Sourei, Konami, Mirai, Saki Kashima & Syuri)	Ten-woman tag team match	11:59
6	Suzu Suzuki defeated Natsuko Tora	5 Star Grand Prix tournament match	8:11
7	Natsupoi defeated Mayu Iwatani	5 Star Grand Prix tournament match	11:08

=== Night 8 ===
The eighth night took place on August 12, 2023.

No.	Results	Stipulations	Times
1	Rina defeated Hina and Miyu Amasaki	Three-way match	5:17
2	Thekla defeated Saya Iida	Singles match	6:45
3	Oedo Tai (Natsuko Tora and Black Desire (Momo Watanabe and Starlight Kid)) defeated Cosmic Angels (meltear (Tam Nakano and Natsupoi) and Yuna Mizumori)	Six-woman tag team match	10:55
4	Stars (Mayu Iwatani and FWC (Hazuki and Koguma)) defeated Club Venus (Mariah May and Waka Tsukiyama) and Hanako	Six-woman tag team match	11:42
5	Megan Bayne, Maika, Suzu Suzuki and Mei Seira defeated God's Eye (Abarenbo GE (Mirai and Ami Sourei), Syuri and Saki Kashima)	Eight-woman tag team match	9:22
6	Hanan defeated AZM	5 Star Grand Prix tournament match	11:02
7	Mina Shirakawa defeated Giulia	5 Star Grand Prix tournament match	12:33
8	Utami Hayashishita defeated Saori Anou	5 Star Grand Prix tournament match	13:06

=== Stardom x Stardom: Osaka Summer Team ===
A match for the tournament took place at Stardom x Stardom: Osaka Summer Team on August 13, 2023.

No.	Results	Stipulations	Times
1	Starlight Kid defeated Natsuko Tora	5 Star Grand Prix tournament match	7:31

=== Night 9 ===
The ninth night took place on August 15, 2023.

No.	Results	Stipulations	Times
1	Natsupoi defeated Saya Kamitani by forfeit	5 Star Grand Prix tournament match	—
2	Stars (Koguma and Classmates (Hanan and Saya Iida)) defeated Queen's Quest (Lady C, Miyu Amasaki and Hina)	Six-woman tag team match	7:23
3	God's Eye (Mirai and Saki Kashima) defeated Cosmic Angels (Natsupoi and Yuna Mizumori)	Tag team match	4:51
4	Nanae Takahashi, Megan Bayne, Suzu Suzuki and Mei Seira defeated Oedo Tai (Natsuko Tora, Starlight Kid, Ruaka and Fukigen Death)	Eight-woman tag team match	9:36
5	Momo Watanabe defeated Saori Anou	5 Star Grand Prix tournament match	9:20
6	Mariah May defeated Mina Shirakawa	5 Star Grand Prix tournament match	11:47
7	Tam Nakano vs. Mayu Iwatani ended in a time-limit draw	5 Star Grand Prix tournament match	15:00
8	Syuri defeated Hazuki	5 Star Grand Prix tournament match	11:39
9	AZM defeated Utami Hayashishita	5 Star Grand Prix tournament match	10:10

=== Night 10 ===
The tenth night took place on August 20, 2023.

No.	Results	Stipulations	Times
1	Queen's Quest (Utami Hayashishita and Miyu Amasaki) defeated Saki Kashima and Hanako	Tag team match	5:57
2	Stars (Koguma, Hanan and Saya Iida) defeated YoungOED (Starlight Kid, Ruaka and Rina)	Six-woman tag team match	9:41
3	Club Venus (Mariah May and Waka Tsukiyama) defeated Cosmic Angels (Natsupoi and Yuna Mizumori)	Tag team match	8:20
4	Megan Bayne, Thekla and Mei Seira defeated Queen's Quest (Lady C, AZM and Hina)	Six-woman tag team match	12:04
5	Hazuki defeated Ami Sourei	5 Star Grand Prix tournament match	14:02
6	Natsuko Tora defeated Mayu Iwatani	5 Star Grand Prix tournament match	13:07

=== Night 11 ===
The eleventh night took place on August 26, 2023.

No.	Results	Stipulations	Times
1	Starlight Kid defeated Saya Kamitani by forfeit	5 Star Grand Prix tournament match	—
2	Black Desire (Momo Watanabe and Starlight Kid) defeated Saya Iida and Hanako	Tag team match	7:11
3	Club Venus (Mariah May and Waka Tsukiyama) defeated Queen's Quest (Lady C and Miyu Amasaki)	Tag team match	7:34
4	God's Eye (Syuri and Ami Sourei) defeated Cosmic Angels (Natsupoi and Yuna Mizumori)	Tag team match	10:27
5	Megan Bayne, Thekla and Mei Seira defeated Stars (Mayu Iwatani, Hanan and Momo Kohgo)	Six-woman tag team match	9:15
6	Natsuko Tora defeated Tam Nakano	5 Star Grand Prix tournament match	11:16
7	Mirai defeated Giulia	5 Star Grand Prix tournament match	12:17
8	Maika defeated Utami Hayashishita	5 Star Grand Prix tournament match	13:50

=== Night 12 ===
The twelfth night took place on August 27, 2023.

No.	Results	Stipulations	Times
1	Waka Tsukiyama defeated Miyu Amasaki and Hanako	Three-way match	5:26
2	Megan Bayne and Mei Seira defeated Queen's Quest (Utami Hayashishita and Lady C)	Tag team match	7:39
3	Abarenbo GE (Syuri and Mirai) defeated Cosmic Angels (Tam Nakano and Yuna Mizumori)	Tag team match	10:15
4	Donna Del Mondo (Giulia, Maika and Thekla) defeated Stars (Saya Iida and H&M's (Mayu Iwatani and Momo Kohgo))	Six-woman tag team match	9:28
5	Saori Anou defeated Hanan	5 Star Grand Prix tournament match	7:09
6	Mariah May defeated Momo Watanabe	5 Star Grand Prix tournament match	11:53
7	Ami Sourei defeated Starlight Kid	5 Star Grand Prix tournament match	11:56
8	Natsuko Tora defeated Natsupoi	5 Star Grand Prix tournament match	12:24

=== Night 13 ===
The thirteenth night took place on September 2, 2023.

No.	Results	Stipulations	Times
1	Starlight Kid defeated Thekla	Singles match	8:23
2	Cosmic Angels (Tam Nakano and Yuna Mizumori) defeated Queen's Quest (Lady C and Miyu Amasaki)	Tag team match	5:03
3	Maika, Suzu Suzuki and Mei Seira defeated Megan Bayne, Momo Kohgo and Hanako	Six-woman tag team match	8:31
4	God's Eye (Syuri and Konami) defeated God's Eye (Mirai and Saki Kashima)	Tag team match	10:10
5	Utami Hayashishita defeated Mariah May	5 Star Grand Prix tournament match	9:41
6	AZM defeated Mina Shirakawa	5 Star Grand Prix tournament match	10:53
7	Giulia defeated Momo Watanabe	5 Star Grand Prix tournament match	10:28
8	Mayu Iwatani defeated Ami Sourei	5 Star Grand Prix tournament match	10:32

=== Night 14 ===
The fourteenth night took place at 5Star Special in Hiroshima on September 3, 2023.

No.	Results	Stipulations	Times
1	Hazuki defeated Saya Kamitani by forfeit	5 Star Grand Prix tournament match	—
2	Utami Hayashishita defeated Momo Watanabe	5 Star Grand Prix tournament match	9:26
3	Tam Nakano defeated Starlight Kid	5 Star Grand Prix tournament match	8:28
4	Syuri defeated Mayu Iwatani	5 Star Grand Prix tournament match	12:30

=== Night 15 ===
The fifteenth night took place on September 9, 2023.

No.	Results	Stipulations	Times
1	Syuri defeated Saya Kamitani by forfeit	5 Star Grand Prix tournament match	—
2	Miyu Amasaki and Hanako defeated Queen's Quest (Hina and Lady C)	Tag team match	6:54
3	Megan Bayne and Mei Seira defeated Club Venus (Mariah May and Waka Tsukiyama)	Tag team match	8:26
4	God's Eye (Syuri and Saki Kashima) defeated Cosmic Angels (Natsupoi and Yuna Mizumori)	Tag team match	8:28
5	Stars (Mayu Iwatani, Koguma and Momo Kohgo) defeated Oedo Tai (Natsuko Tora, Rina and Fukigen Death)	Six-woman tag team match	7:49
6	Saori Anou defeated Mirai	5 Star Grand Prix tournament match	12:42
7	Hazuki defeated Starlight Kid	5 Star Grand Prix tournament match	10:19
8	Suzu Suzuki defeated Tam Nakano	5 Star Grand Prix tournament match	13:24
9	Giulia defeated Maika	5 Star Grand Prix tournament match	12:12

=== Night 16 ===
The sixteenth night took place on September 16, 2023.

No.	Results	Stipulations	Times
1	Mei Seira defeated Waka Tsukiyama	Singles match	6:23
2	Oedo Tai (Momo Watanabe, Starlight Kid and Ruaka) defeated Stars (Koguma, Saya Iida and Hanan)	Six-woman tag team match	8:18
3	Suzu Suzuki and Megan Bayne defeated Utami Hayashishita and Hanako	Tag team match	7:23
4	God's Eye (Mirai and Saki Kashima) defeated Cosmic Angels (Saori Anou and Yuna Mizumori) and Rose Gold (Mariah May and Mina Shirakawa)	Three-way tag team match	7:54
5	Tam Nakano defeated Ami Sourei	5 Star Grand Prix tournament match	10:02
6	Hazuki defeated Natsupoi	5 Star Grand Prix tournament match	12:29
7	Maika defeated AZM	5 Star Grand Prix tournament match	8:43

=== Night 17 ===
The seventeenth night took place on September 17, 2023.

No.	Results	Stipulations	Times
1	Saya Iida defeated Hanako	Singles match	6:46
2	YoungOED (Starlight Kid and Ruaka) defeated Queen's Quest (Utami Hayashishita and AZM) and Club Venus (Mina Shirakawa and Waka Tsukiyama)	Three-way tag team match	6:31
3	Maika and Megan Bayne defeated Cosmic Angels (Tam Nakano and Yuna Mizumori)	Tag team match	8:38
4	Koguma defeated Saki Kashima, Mei Seira, Hazuki and Natsupoi	Five-way match	6:15
5	Momo Watanabe defeated Hanan	5 Star Grand Prix tournament match	10:52
6	Mirai defeated Mariah May	5 Star Grand Prix tournament match	12:53
7	Suzu Suzuki defeated Ami Sourei	5 Star Grand Prix tournament match	11:29

=== Night 18 ===
The eighteenth night took place on September 18, 2023.

No.	Results	Stipulations	Times
1	Club Venus (Mariah May and Waka Tsukiyama) defeated YoungOED (Starlight Kid and Ruaka)	Tag team match	9:25
2	Stars (Koguma and Hanan) defeated God's Eye (Mirai and Saki Kashima)	Tag team match	7:40
3	Megan Bayne and Maika defeated Hanako and Saya Iida	Tag team match	6:18
4	Mei Seira and Suzu Suzuki defeated Cosmic Angels (Tam Nakano and Yuna Mizumori)	Tag team match	9:11
5	Stars (Mayu Iwatani and Hazuki) vs. Queen's Quest (Utami Hayashishita and AZM) ended in a time-limit draw	Tag team match	15:00
6	Ami Sourei defeated Natsupoi	5 Star Grand Prix tournament match	10:04
7	Mina Shirakawa defeated Momo Watanabe	5 Star Grand Prix tournament match	14:07

=== Night 19 ===
The nineteenth night took place on September 20, 2023.

No.	Results	Stipulations	Times
1	Mirai defeated Ami Sourei, Saki Kashima and Yuna Mizumori	Four-way match	4:56
2	Stars (Mayu Iwatani, Saya Iida and Hanan) defeated Club Venus (Mina Shirakawa and Waka Tsukiyama) and Hanako	Six-woman tag team match	7:31
3	Megan Bayne, Mei Seira and Suzu Suzuki defeated Oedo Tai (BMI2000 (Natsuko Tora and Ruaka and Momo Watanabe)	Six-woman tag team match	7:38
4	Maika defeated Mariah May	5 Star Grand Prix tournament match	8:55
5	AZM defeated Giulia	5 Star Grand Prix tournament match	0:55
6	Mirai defeated Utami Hayashishita by forfeit (Note: Hayashishita suffered an injury before the bout and was announced to forfeit all of her remaining matches.)	5 Star Grand Prix tournament match	—
7	Tam Nakano defeated Syuri	5 Star Grand Prix tournament match	13:22

=== Night 20 ===
The twentieth night took place on September 23, 2023.

No.	Results	Stipulations	Times
1	Mayu Iwatani defeated Saya Kamitani by forfeit	5 Star Grand Prix tournament match	—
2	Ami Sourei defeated Yuna Mizumori	Singles match	6:01
3	Giulia defeated Hanako	Singles match	6:45
4	Megan Bayne and Mei Seira defeated Stars (Koguma and Saya Iida)	Tag team match	8:07
5	Stars (Mayu Iwatani and Hanan) defeated Club Venus (Mariah May and Waka Tsukiyama)	Tag team match	7:18
6	God's Eye (Mirai, Saki Kashima and Syuri) defeated Oedo Tai (Natsuko Tora, Ruaka and Starlight Kid)	Six-woman tag team match	13:51
7	Maika vs. Mina Shirakawa ended in a time-limit draw	5 Star Grand Prix tournament match	15:00
8	Suzu Suzuki defeated Hazuki	5 Star Grand Prix tournament match	11:35

=== Night 21 ===
The twenty-first night took place on September 24, 2023.

No.	Results	Stipulations	Times
1	Hanan defeated Utami Hayashishita by forfeit	5 Star Grand Prix tournament match	—
2	Hanan defeated Waka Tsukiyama	Singles match	6:02
3	Koguma defeated Saki Kashima and Yuna Mizumori	Three-way match	6:45
4	Mei Seira and Suzu Suzuki defeated Hanako and Megan Bayne	Tag team match	9:54
5	Syuri defeated Starlight Kid	5 Star Grand Prix tournament match	10:56
6	Club Venus (Mariah May and Mina Shirakawa) defeated Oedo Tai (Natsuko Tora and Ruaka)	Tag team match	11:42
7	Donna Del Mondo (Giulia and Maika) defeated Stars (Hazuki and Saya Iida)	Tag team match	14:06

=== Night 22 ===
The twenty-second and final night took place on September 30, 2023.

No.	Results	Stipulations	Times
1	Suzu Suzuki defeated Saya Kamitani by forfeit	5 Star Grand Prix tournament match	—
2	Giulia defeated Utami Hayashishita by forfeit	5 Star Grand Prix tournament match	—
3	Mayu Iwatani defeated Starlight Kid by forfeit (Note: Starlight Kid suffered an ankle injury one day prior to the event at New Blood 11.)	5 Star Grand Prix tournament match	—
4^{P}	Suzu Suzuki won by last eliminating Mei Seira (Note: The other participants were Hanako, Saya Iida, Hina, Miyu Amasaki, Saki Kashima, Yuna Mizumori, Koguma, Megan Bayne, Mayu Iwatani, Giulia, Waka Tsukiyama, Ruaka, Rina and Thekla.)	Battle royal	16:00
5^{P}	Hanan defeated Mariah May	5 Star Grand Prix tournament match	8:47
6	Momo Watanabe defeated AZM	5 Star Grand Prix tournament match	8:13
7	Saori Anou defeated Mina Shirakawa	5 Star Grand Prix tournament match	11:07
8	Maika defeated Mirai	5 Star Grand Prix tournament match	11:00
9	Ami Sourei defeated Syuri	5 Star Grand Prix tournament match	9:14
10	Hazuki defeated Natsuko Tora	5 Star Grand Prix tournament match	9:41
11	Natsupoi defeated Tam Nakano	5 Star Grand Prix tournament match	10:54
12	Suzu Suzuki defeated Maika	5 Star Grand Prix tournament final match	14:03
P / – the match was broadcast on the pre-show

== See also ==
- Champion Carnival
- G1 Climax
- N-1 Victory
- AEW Continental Classic
