= Hanako (wrestler) =

Japanese professional wrestler

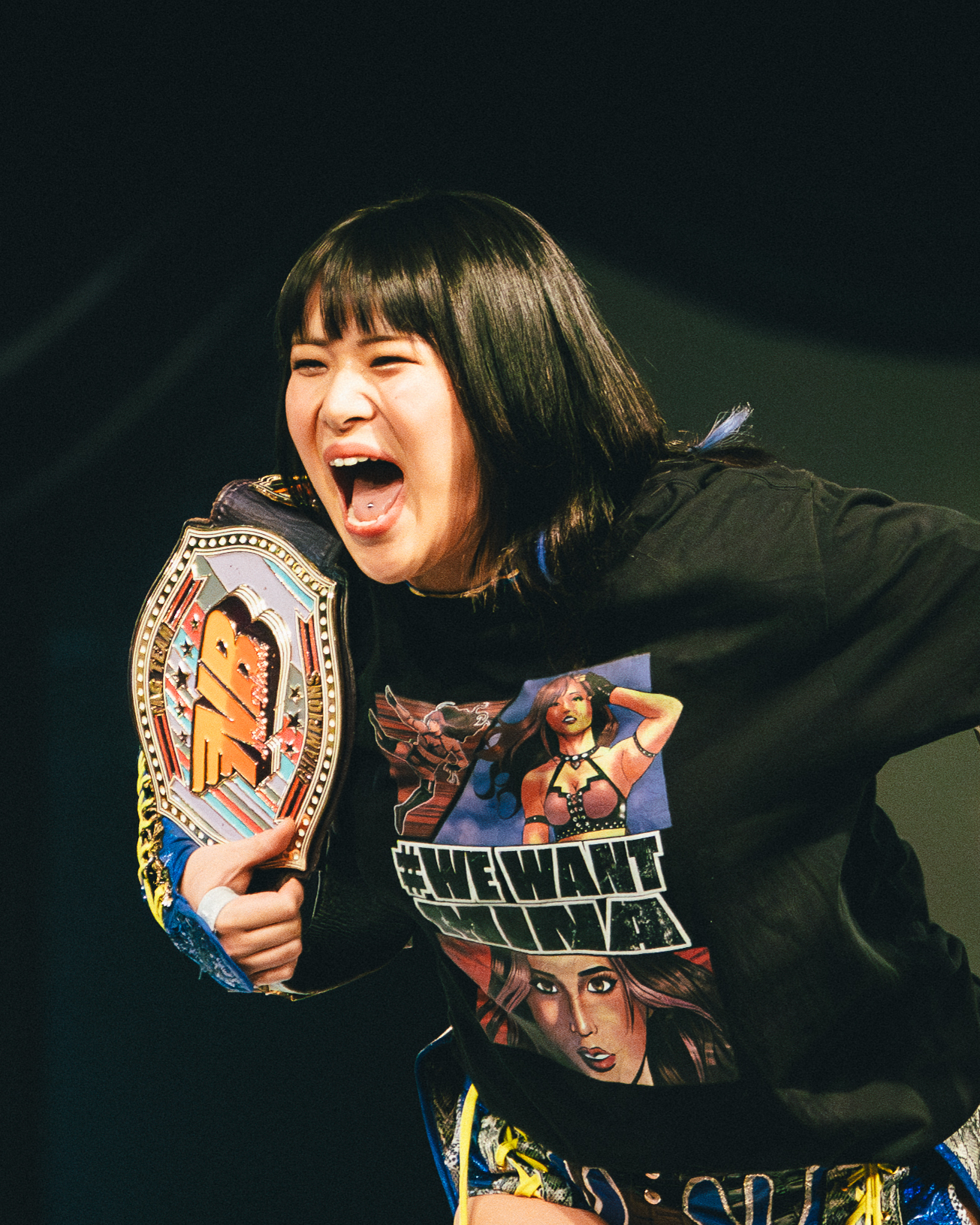
- Hanako as one half of the New Blood Tag Team Champions in April 2025

Personal information
- Born: 14 September 2000 (age 26) Kyoto, Japan

Professional wrestling career
- Ring name: Fella Risa Hanako
- Billed height: 181 cm (5 ft 11 in)
- Billed weight: 80 kg (176 lb)
- Trained by: Risa Sera; Mina Shirakawa; Maika
- Debut: 2022

Hanako Ueda (上田華子, Ueda Hanako) better known mononymously by her ring name Hanako (stylized as HANAKO), is a Japanese professional wrestler signed to World Wonder Ring Stardom, where she is a member of Stars and a former Future of Stardom Champion.

== Early life ==
During her junior high school years, Ueda has had a volleyball sports background and was also part of the school's Brass band.

Ueda first came into contact with professional wrestling in her high school years when she attended a local event alongside her mother and another person from her mother's workplace. She continued watching professional wrestling during her university years when she regularly watched Student wrestling (学生プロレス, Gakusei Puroresu) groups. She attended one such kind of festival held within the Ritsumeikan University which she attended alongside her cousin. Also during her university years, she joined an intercollegiate student wrestling club. At first, she had no intention of physically starting to involve into wrestling as she only worked behind the scenes as a manager. However, after watching her seniors wrestle, she wished to get into the ring herself, and with the encouragement of others, she began competing.

== Professional wrestling career ==
=== Prominence (2022) ===
Ueda was given her first wrestling opportunity in late 2022. She made her professional wrestling debut in Prominence's lineage of events in which she fell short to Risa Sera on 28 August 2022. Ueda competed in several other events under the name of "Fella Risa" until December 2022.

=== World Wonder Ring Stardom (2023–present) ===
Ueda made her debut in World Wonder Ring Stardom at Stardom New Blood Premium on 25 March 2023, where she teamed up with Lady C in a losing effort against MaiHime (Maika and Himeka) in tag team competition. In her rookie years with the promotion, Ueda became a regular competitor in the New Blood events. At Stardom New Blood 8 on 12 May 2023, she teamed up with Lady C to unsuccessfully challenge Bloody Fate (Karma and Starlight Kid) for the New Blood Tag Team Championship. At Stardom New Blood 9 on 2 June 2023, Ueda teamed up with Aya Sakura in a losing effort against The New Eras (Ami Sourei and Mirai). At Stardom New Blood 10 on 18 August 2023, she teamed up with Kizuna Tanaka and Honoka to defeat God's Eye (Ami Sourei, Nanami) and Miran. At Stardom New Blood 11 on 28 September 2023, she fell short to Tanaka and Hina in a three-way match. At Stardom New Blood West 1 on 17 November 2023, Ueda unsuccessfully challenged Rina for the Future of Stardom Championship. At Stardom New Blood 12 on 25 December 2203, she teamed up with Yuzuki in a losing effort against Haruka Umesaki and Miyu Amasaki. At Stardom New Blood 13 on 21 June 2024, she wrestled Saran into a time-limit draw. At Stardom New Blood 14 on 13 September 2024, Ueda teamed up with Empress Nexus Venus stablemate Waka Tsukiyama to defeat wing★gori (Hanan and Saya Iida).

On the finals night of the Stardom Cinderella Tournament 2023 from 15 April, Ueda wrestled Aya Sakura into a time-limit draw. At Stardom All Star Grand Queendom on 23 April 2023, she competed in the Yokohama Rumble match won by Mai Sakurai. At Stardom Fukuoka Goddess Legend on 5 May 2023, she competed in a Fukuoka Rumble match won by Suzu Suzuki. At Stardom Flashing Champions 2023 on 28 May, Ueda teamed up with Neo Stardom Army (Nanae Takahashi and Yuna Mizumori) in a losing effort against Maika, Suzu Suzuki and Mei Seira. At Stardom Sunshine 2023 on 25 June, she fell short to Takahashi in one of the latter's "Passion injection" matches. At Stardom Mid Summer Champions 2023 on 2 July, she teamed up with Mei Seira and Suzu Suzuki to defeat Classmates (Hazuki and Saya Iida) and Aya Sakura. At Stardom x Stardom: Osaka Summer Team on 13 August 2023, Ueda teamed up with Syuri and unsuccessfully competed in a Gauntlet tag team match won by Suzu Suzuki and Mei Seira. At Stardom Midsummer Festival on 19 August 2023, she fell short to Mei Seira and Fukigen Death in a three-way match. At Stardom Gold Rush 2023 on 18 November, she teamed up with God's Eye (Konami and Ami Sourei) in a losing effort against Stars (Hazuki, Hanan and Saya Iida). At Stardom Nagoya Big Winter on 2 December 2023, she teamed up with Miyu Amasaki to defeat Mina Shirakawa and Yuzuki. At Stardom Dream Queendom 2023 on 29 December, she teamed up with Kurara Sayaka and Ranna Yagami in a loing effort against Miyu Amasaki, Azusa Inaba and Yuzuki.

At Ittenyon Stardom Gate on 4 January 2024, she teamed up with Yuzuki and Ranna Yagami to defeat Queen's Quest (Lady C and Hina) and Sayaka Kurara. At Stardom Supreme Fight 2024 on 2 February, she competed in a four-way match won by Mai Sakurai and also involving Ruaka and Ranna Yagami. At Stardom The Conversion on 22 June 2024, she teamed up with Mina Shirakawa to defeat Cosmic Tropical Fairy Super Angel (Natsupoi and Yuna Mizumori). On the first night of the Stardom Sapporo World Rendezvous from 27 July 2024, she fell short to Mayu Iwatani in singles competition. At Stardom Namba Grand Fight on 14 September 2024, she teamed up with Waka Tsukiyama to defeat God's Eye (Hina and Ranna Yagami).

Ueda competed in several signature events promoted by Stardom. At Stardom New Year Stars 2024, she took part into the revived Stardom Rookie of the Year tournament in which she defeated Kurara Sayaka in the first rounds then fell short to Yuzuki in the finals. She took part into the Stardom Cinderella Tournament 2024 in which she fell short to Hanan in the first rounds. At Stardom All Star Grand Queendom 2024 on 27 April, she teamed up with Empress Nexus Venus stablemates Xena and Waka Tsukiyama in a losing effort against God's Eye (Syuri, Konami and Ami Sohrei).

=== New Japan Pro Wrestling (2024–present) ===
Due to World Wonder Ring Stardom being New Japan Pro Wrestling's promotion, Hanako often competes in events promoted by the latter. She made her first appearance at NJPW Academy Showcase #4 on 3 August 2024, where she defeated Jada Stone in singles competition. At Capital Collision on 30 August 2024, she teamed up with Mina Shirakawa to defeat Trish Adora and Viva Van.

=== American independent scene (2024) ===
At MLW Summer of the Beasts, and event promoted by Major League Wrestling (MLW) on 29 August 2024, Ueda unsuccessfully challenged Janai Kai for the MLW World Women's Featherweight Championship.

=== Ring of Honor (2024-2025) ===
Hanako made her Ring of Honor debut At ROH Final Battle Zero Hour on 20 December 2024, defeating Harley Cameron in singles competition. On 2 January 2025, she unsuccessfully challenged Red Velvet for the ROH Women's World Television Championship

== Championships and accomplishments ==
- Pro-Wrestling: EVE
  - Pro-Wrestling: EVE Tag Team Championship (1 time, current) – with Maika
- Pro Wrestling Illustrated
  - Ranked No. 198 of the top 250 female wrestlers in the PWI Women's 250 in 2025
- World Wonder Ring Stardom
  - New Blood Tag Team Championship (1 time) — with Waka Tsukiyama
  - Future of Stardom Championship (1 time)
  - 5★Star GP Award (1 times)
    - 5★Star GP Blue Stars Best Match Award (2026) vs. Hina on August 2 in Blue Stars A
