= Mirai (wrestler) =

Japanese professional wrestler (1982–2005)

Personal information
- Born: Chiemi Kitagami (北上 知恵美, Kitagami Chiemi); November 17, 1982 Otaru City, Hokkaido, Japan
- Died: September 14, 2005 (aged 22) Otaru City, Japan
- Cause of death: Drowning; ruled an accident

Professional wrestling career
- Ring name(s): Mirai; Ruka; Chiemi Kitagami
- Billed height: 1.68 m (5 ft 6 in)
- Billed weight: 65 kg (143 lb)
- Trained by: All Japan Women's Pro Wrestling
- Debut: September 23, 2001

Chiemi Kitagami (北上 知恵美, Kitagami Chiemi; November 17, 1982 – September 14, 2005) was a Japanese professional wrestler. She made her debut in September 2001 for All Japan Women's Pro Wrestling under her real name but left the promotion shortly after. In 2002, she joined Kaientai Dojo as a trainee but left before ever competing for the promotion. In 2003, she changed her name to Mirai (未来, "The Future") and debuted for AtoZ, joining the Z-Spirits stable. After leaving AtoZ in 2005, she became a freelancer, competing for Ms Style, K-Dojo and JWP Joshi Puroresu.

Kitagami died after drowning in her bathtub on September 14, 2005. She was 22 years old.

== Career ==
Kitagami enrolled in the All Japan Women's Pro Wrestling (AJW) dojo when she was just 18 years old, debuting on September 23, 2001, going to a time-limit draw with fellow trainee Tomoko Morii. After less than six months as an active wrestler with the promotion, she left in January 2002 and became inactive for over a year. She briefly joined Kaientai Dojo in the fall of 2002 as a trainee, but left before ever competing for the promotion. She would join AtoZ in 2003 and change her ring name to Mirai (未来, "The Future"), and in her return match in July, defeated Yukari Kitao. After almost two years with AtoZ, Mirai quit the promotion in March 2005 and announced she would be taking a hiatus from pro wrestling as a whole, citing problems with depression as her main reason. She returned to the ring in May as a freelancer, and also debuted her masked character Ruka (流華). She wrestled her last match on September 12, 2005, for the Neo promotion, teaming with Haruka Matsuo in a loss to Kyoko Inoue and Takako Inoue.

== Death ==
Kitagami was first diagnosed with depression in January 2005, and subsequently left AtoZ as a result. During this time, she kept an online diary, where she openly discussed suffering from depression and disclosed that she previously attempted suicide at some point in early 2005. She also expressed frustration at the fact that she continued to take medication but saw no improvement in her mental condition. Despite this, she returned to pro wrestling in mid-2005, and was active until two days before her death.

At around 2:00pm on September 14, 2005, Kitagami was found unconscious in the bathtub of her apartment. She was pronounced dead at the age of 22 shortly after. Despite her history of mental health issues and her previous suicide attempt, her death was ruled accidental and was revealed to the public by her friend and fellow professional wrestler Gami the following day. At the request of her family, no public memorial was held; however, tributes were paid by many wrestling organisations, including Ibuki, JWP Joshi Puroresu, and numerous freelance shows.

== Championship and accomplishments ==
- Atoz
  - Diamond Jr 5 Championship (one time)
