= Stardom New Blood 11 =

2023 World Wonder Ring Stardom event

New Blood 11
- Promotion: World Wonder Ring Stardom
- Date: September 28, 2023
- City: Tokyo, Japan
- Venue: Shinagawa Intercity Hall
- Attendance: 357

Event chronology
← Previous; Dream Tag Festival	Next → Nagoya Golden Fight

New Blood chronology
← Previous; New Blood 10	Next → New Blood West 1

Stardom New Blood 11 (スターダムニューブラッド11, Sutādamunyūburaddo 11) was a professional wrestling event promoted by World Wonder Ring Stardom. The event took place on September 28, 2023, in Tokyo, Japan, at the Shinagawa Intercity Hall and aired as a VOD show.

Seven matches were contested at the event. The main event saw wing★gori (Saya Iida and Hanan) defeat Unique Glare (Karma and Starlight Kid) and 02line (AZM and Miyu Amasaki) to win the New Blood Tag Team Championship.

== Production ==
=== Background ===
"New Blood" is a series of events that mainly focus on matches where rookie wrestlers, usually with three or fewer years of in-ring experience, evolve. Besides wrestlers from Stardom, various superstars from multiple promotions of the Japanese independent scene are invited to compete in bouts that are usually going under the stipulation of singles or tag team matches.

The show featured seven professional wrestling matches that result from scripted storylines, where wrestlers portray villains, heroes, or less distinguishable characters in the scripted events that build tension and culminate in a wrestling match or series of matches. The event's press conference took place on September 12, 2023, and was broadcast live on Stardom's YouTube channel.

=== Event ===
The event began with the three-way match between Pro Wrestling Wave's Kizuna Tanaka, Hanako and Hina, solded with the victory of the latter. Next up, Ruaka picked up a victory over Lady C in singles competition. In the third bout, Donna Del Mondo's Thekla defeated Club Venus' Sexy Dynamite Princess and Waka Tsukiyama in three-way action. In the fourth bout, Tam Nakano defeated Yuna Mizumori in what was billed as Mizumori's admission match into the Cosmic Angels unit. Despite the latter falling short, Nakano was impressed by her performance and appointed Mizumori as an official member of the unit. The fifth bout saw 7Upp's Nanae Takahashi picking up a victory over Mei Seira in one of her Passion injection matches. In the semi main event, Rina defeated Professional Wrestling Just Tap Out's Azusa Inaba to secure the third consecutive defense of the Future of Stardom Championship in that respective reign.

In the main event, Saya Iida and Hanan defeated reigning champions Karma and Starlight Kid, and AZM and Miyu Amasaki in a three-way tag team match to win the New Blood Tag Team Championship.

== Results ==
No.	Results	Stipulations	Times
1	Hina defeated Kizuna Tanaka and Hanako by pinfall	Three-way match	7:02
2	Ruaka defeated Lady C by pinfall	Singles match	5:59
3	Thekla defeated Sexy Dynamite Princess and Waka Tsukiyama by pinfall	Three-way match	6:06
4	Tam Nakano defeated Yuna Mizumori by pinfall	Singles match This was Mizumori's official admission match into the Cosmic Angels unit.	12:22
5	Nanae Takahashi defeated Mei Seira by pinfall	Passion inection match	14:33
6	Rina (c) defeated Azusa Inaba by pinfall	Singles match for the Future of Stardom Championship	11:59
7	wing★gori (Saya Iida and Hanan) defeated Unique Glare (Starlight Kid and Karma) (c) and 02line (AZM and Miyu Amasaki) by pinfall	Three-way tag team match for the New Blood Tag Team Championship	14:57
(c) / – the champion(s) heading into the match
