= Megan Bayne =

American professional wrestler

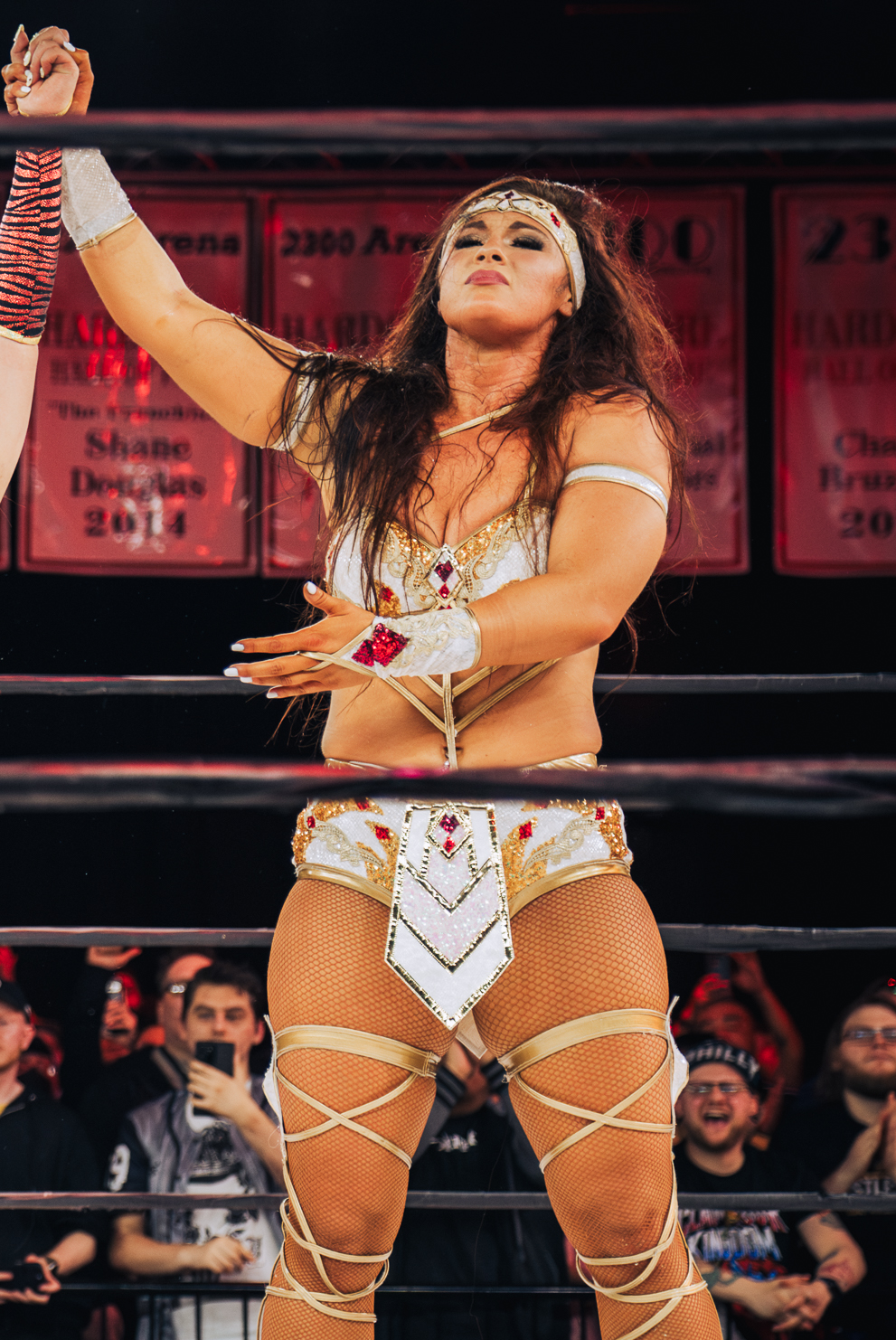
- Bayne in April 2024

Personal information
- Born: Megan Doheny; June 1, 1998 (age 28) East Haven, Connecticut, U.S.

Professional wrestling career
- Ring name(s): Meg; Meg Monroe; Megan Bayne; Megan Doheny
- Billed height: 5 ft 11 in (180 cm)
- Billed from: Thessaloniki
- Trained by: Damian Adams; Rip Rogers; Al Snow; Matt Cappotelli
- Debut: November 8, 2017

Megan Doheny (born June 1, 1998), better known by her ring name Megan Bayne (Japanese: メーガン・ベーン, Hepburn: Mēgan Bēn), is an American professional wrestler. As of February 2025, she is signed to All Elite Wrestling (AEW), where she is a former one-time AEW Women's World Tag Team Champion with Lena Kross as Divine Dominion. She also makes appearances for the Japanese promotion World Wonder Ring Stardom, and on the American independent circuit, primarily for Game Changer Wrestling (GCW) and House of Glory (HOG).

Described as one of the top independent performers in the U.S., Doheny is best known for her tenure at Ohio Valley Wrestling (OVW), where she first launched her wrestling career in 2017 and won the OVW Women's Championship in 2019. She has also achieved success in Japanese professional wrestling through her work at women's wrestling promotion World Wonder Ring Stardom.

== Professional wrestling career ==
=== Independent circuit (2017–present) ===
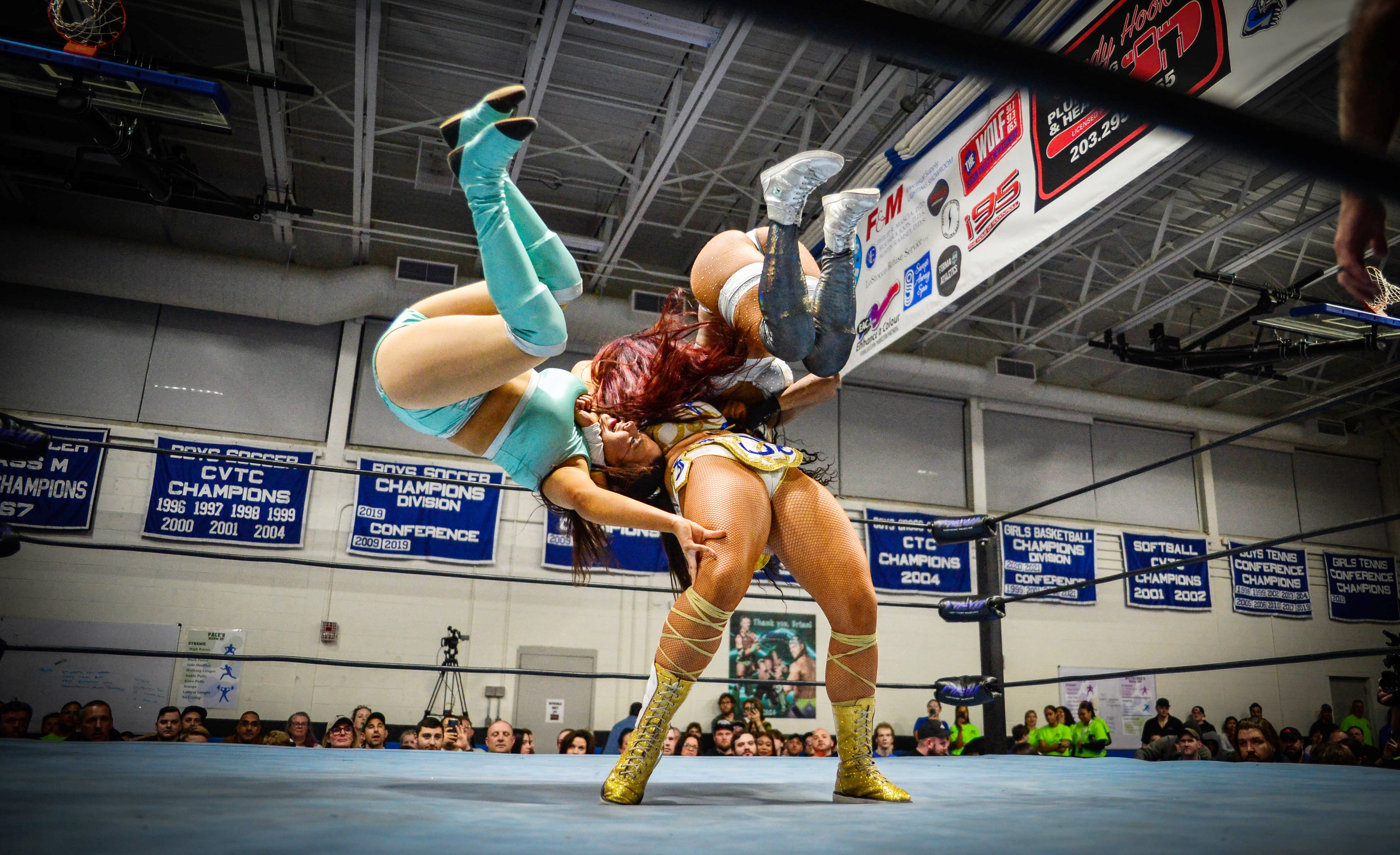
Bayne suplexing two opponents at the same time in 2024; Bayne's power is a staple of her style

Doheny made her professional wrestling debut in Ohio Valley Wrestling in November 2017. She worked for OVW until 2023, winning the OVW Women's Championship once. She dropped the title to Max the Impaler at OVW TV #1055 on October 29, 2019. Due to OVW holding developmental partnerships with Impact Wrestling, Doheny competed at Impact Wrestling/OVW Outbreak on February 21, 2020, where she unsuccessfully challenged Jessicka Havok, Jordynne Grace and Kiera Hogan in a four-way match. She would tear her ACL in early 2022 and miss the remainder of the year.

Doheny also worked in the American independent scene. On July 31, 2021, during the sixth ECWA Women's Super 8 Tournament, she defeated Ashley D'Amboise to win the tournament at the finals. She would tear her ACL in early 2022 and miss the remainder of the year.

=== All Elite Wrestling (2021–2023) ===
Bayne made her All Elite Wrestling (AEW) debut on the May 4, 2021 episode of Dark, where she lost to Big Swole. From 2021 to 2023, Bayne continued appearing in AEW, mainly on Dark and Elevation.

=== World Wonder Ring Stardom (2023–2024) ===
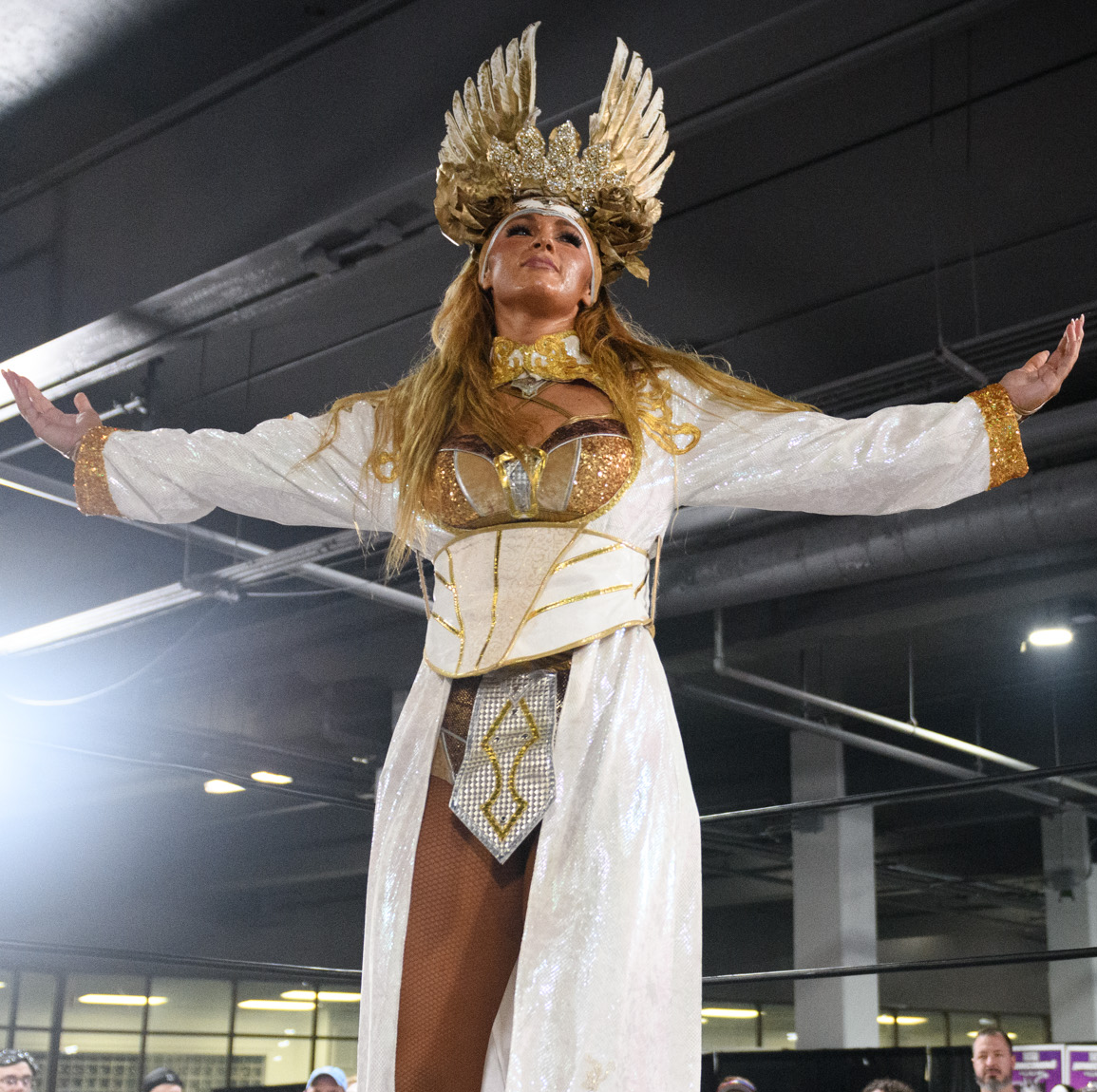
Bayne in her entrance attire in 2024

Doheny made her debut in World Wonder Ring Stardom on the first night of the 2023 Stardom 5 Star Grand Prix from July 23, by attacking Tam Nakano and demanding a match for the World of Stardom Championship. She had her first match on the second night of the tournament from July 29, where she teamed up with Mei Seira and Suzu Suzuki to defeat Stars (Mayu Iwatani, Koguma and Saya Iida) in a six-woman tag team match.

At Stardom x Stardom: Osaka Summer Team on August 13, 2023, she unsuccessfully challenged Nakano for the "red belt". Due to frequently bonding a chemistry with Suzu Suzuki and Maika over the time, Doheny laid a challenge for Baribari Bombers (Giulia, Mai Sakurai and Thekla) at Stardom Nagoya Golden Fight 2023 on October 9. They lost the bout in the process. From October 15 to November 12, Doheny and Maika, together known as Divine Kingdom, competed in the 2023 Goddesses of Stardom Tag League. They won the tournament by defeating Crazy Star (Mei Seira and Suzu Suzuki) in the finals. Divine Kingdom failed to win the vacant Goddesses of Stardom Championship against AphroditE (Saya Kamitani and Utami Hayashishita) on December 2, 2023 at Stardom Nagoya Big Winter.

Bayne wrestled her final match for Stardom at April 4, 2024 at Stardom American Dream 2024, where she unsuccessfully challenged Maika for the World of Stardom Championship.

=== Return to AEW (2025–present) ===
On the January 15, 2025 special episode of Dynamite named Maximum Carnage, she made her AEW television debut participating in the women's Casino Gauntlet match, which was won by Toni Storm. On February 1, AEW President Tony Khan announced that Bayne was officially signed to the promotion. On the February 8 episode of Collision, Bayne attacked Thunder Rosa after Rosa defeated Penelope Ford. Bayne later formed an alliance with Ford and the duo defeated Rosa and Kris Statlander on the March 5 episode of Dynamite. On April 6 at Dynasty, Bayne unsuccessfully challenged Toni Storm for the AEW Women's World Championship. After Dynasty, Bayne and Ford began a feud with Anna Jay and Harley Cameron, with the feud culminating on the May 28 episode of Dynamite, where Bayne and Ford defeating Jay and Cameron in a street fight. On the July 9 episode of Dynamite, Bayne defeated Queen Aminata, Tay Melo, and Thekla in a four-way match to earn the number two entry in the women's Casino Gauntlet match, but failed to win the match three days later at All In. On November 12 at Blood & Guts, Bayne competed in the first ever women's Blood and Guts match, where her team was victorious.

On the February 4, 2026 episode of Dynamite, Bayne and Ford, now known as "MegaBad", defeated the regining AEW Women's World Tag Team Champions Babes of Wrath (Harley Cameron and Willow Nightingale) in a championship eliminator match, earning a title opportunity. On February 14 at Grand Slam Australia, MegaBad failed to win the tag titles from Babes of Wrath. After Ford got injured, Bayne began teaming with Lena Kross as Divine Dominion. At Revolution on March 15, Divine Dominion defeated Babes of Wrath to win the AEW Women's World Tag Team Championship, Bayne's first AEW championship. Divine Dominon would then defeat the Babes of Wrath in a rematch to retain the titles on the March 27 episode of Collision. On April 12 on the Zero Hour pre-show of Dynasty, Divine Dominion successfully defended their titles against Hyan and Maya World. On August 30 at All In, Divine Dominion lost their titles to The Brawling Birds (Jamie Hayter and Alex Windsor), ending their reign at 168 days. On November 4, Divine Dominion competed in a six-on-six Blood and Guts match at the namesake event, where their team was defeated.

=== Return to World Wonder Ring Stardom (2025–present) ===
At Stardom American Dream 2025 on April 18, 2025, Bayne returned to Stardom after a year, teaming with Hai High Mate (Hanako and Maika) to defeat H.A.T.E. (Momo Watanabe and Konami) and Kalientita. In November 2025, Bayne made her return to Japan in the 2025 Goddesses of Stardom Tag League, where she teamed with Hanko as the "Mega Skyscrapers" in Block A. The duo finished with 9 points but were defeated in the semi-finals by Aya Sakura and Sayaka Kurara. On April 26, 2026 at Stardom All Star Grand Queendom 2026, Bayne unsuccessfully challenged Syuri for the IWGP Women's Championship.

== Championships and accomplishments ==
- All Elite Wrestling
  - AEW Women's World Tag Team Championship (1 time) – with Lena Kross
- East Coast Wrestling Association
  - Women's Super 8 Tournament (2021)
- House of Glory
  - HOG Women's Championship (1 time)
- Immortal Championship Wrestling
  - ICW Women's Championship (1 time)
- Ohio Valley Wrestling
  - OVW Women's Championship (1 time)
- Pro Wrestling Illustrated
  - Ranked No. 120 of the top 150 female singles wrestlers in the PWI Women's 150 in 2021
  - Ranked No. 139 of the top 500 singles wrestlers in the PWI 500 in 2024
- Uprising Women Athletes
  - Women's Good As Gold Rumble (2025)
- World Wonder Ring Stardom
  - Goddesses of Stardom Tag League (2023) – with Maika
  - Stardom Year-End Award (1 time)
    - Best Match Award (2023) vs. Giulia on December 29
