= Maika (wrestler) =

Japanese professional wrestler

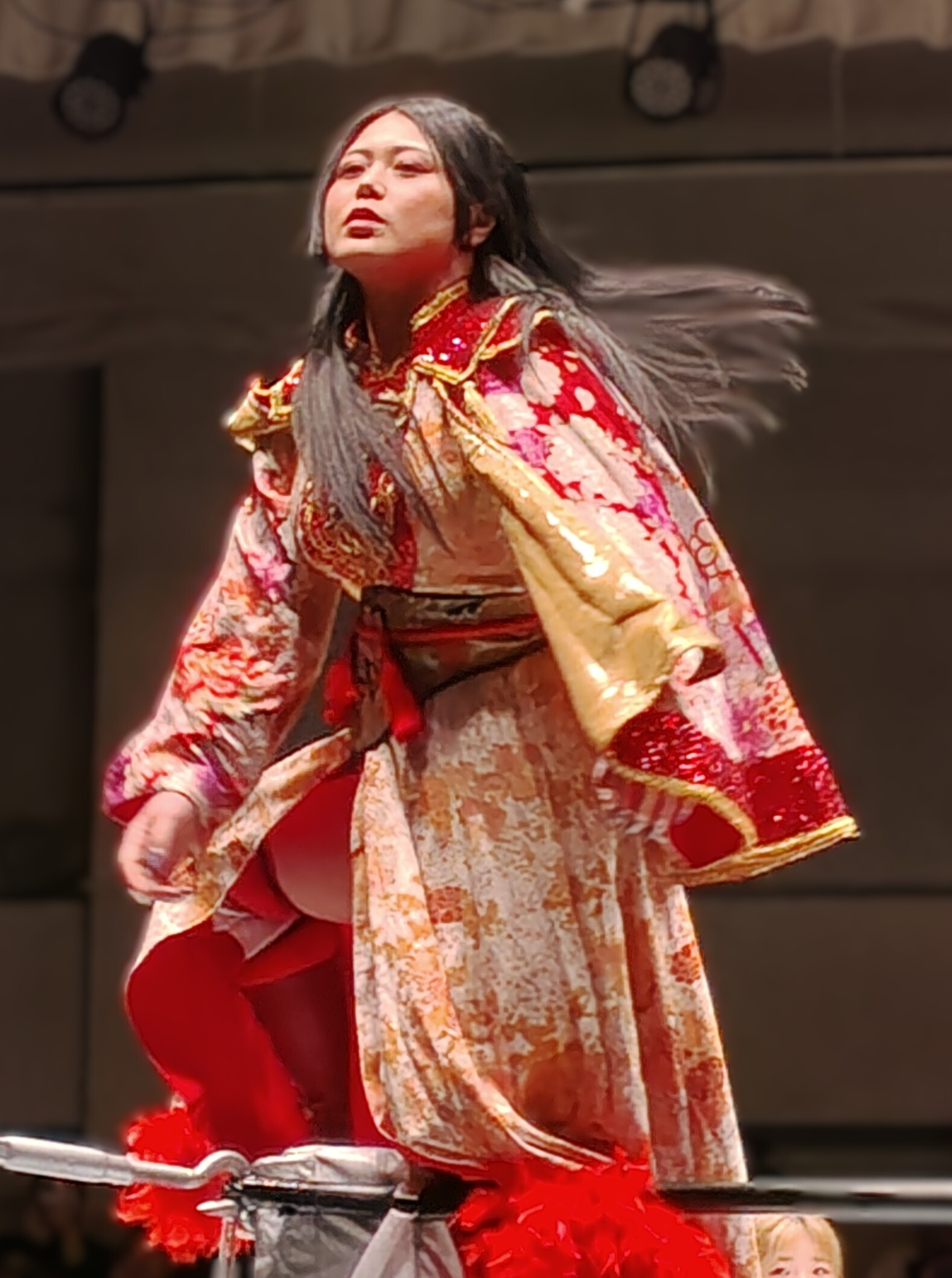
- Maika in January 2026

Personal information
- Born: March 24, 1998 (age 28) Fukuoka, Japan

Professional wrestling career
- Ring name: Maika
- Billed height: 1.62 m (5 ft 4 in)
- Billed weight: 65 kg (143 lb)
- Trained by: Taka Michinoku
- Debut: May 7, 2019

Maika (舞華, Maika; born March 24, 1998) is a Japanese professional wrestler. She is signed to World Wonder Ring Stardom, where she is a member of Stars and a former World of Stardom Champion.

Maika is a former one-time World of Stardom Champion, one-time Goddesses of Stardom Champion, three-time Artist of Stardom Champion and a one-time Future of Stardom Champion. She was also founding member of the Donna Del Mondo stable and the leader of the Empress Nexus Venus stable.

== Professional wrestling career ==
=== Independent circuit (2019–2020) ===
Maika made her professional wrestling debut at TAKATaichiMania II, an independent event produced by Taka Michinoku and Taichi, on May 7, 2019, where she picked up a victory over Mima Shimoda.

=== World Wonder Ring Stardom (2020–present) ===
==== Donna Del Mondo (2020–2024) ====
At a Just Tap Out show on January 14, 2020, Maika unsuccessfully challenged Utami Hayashishita for the Future of Stardom Championship. After the match, Giulia came out to the ring and asked Maika to join Giulia's new unit, later known as Donna Del Mondo. This match also marked the beginning of a rivalry between Maika and Utami. Maika made her debut in World Wonder Ring Stardom on January 19, where she teamed with her Donna Del Mondo teammates to defeat Tokyo Cyber Squad (Death Yama-san, Hana Kimura and Leyla Hirsch). On February 8, Maika, Giulia and Syuri won the Artist of Stardom Championship by defeating Queen's Quest (AZM, Momo Watanabe and Utami Hayashishita). On July 14, Maika won the Future of Stardom Championship by defeating Saya Iida and Saya Kamitani in a three-way match. On November 14, Maika, Giulia and Syuri lost the Artist of Stardom Championship to Oedo Tai (Bea Priestley, Natsuko Tora and Saki Kashima). At Osaka Dream Cinderella 2020 on December 20, Maika lost the Future of Stardom Championship to Saya Iida in another three-way match also involving Saya Kamitani.

At Stardom's 10th Anniversary show on January 17, 2021, Maika unsuccessfully challenged Utami Hayashishita for the World of Stardom Championship. On February 14, Maika and Himeka, later known together as MaiHime, won the Goddesses of Stardom Championship by defeating Oedo Tai (Bea Priestley and Konami). At All Star Dream Cinderella from March 3, MaiHime successfully defended the Goddesses of Stardom Championship against Oedo Tai (Natsuko Tora and Saki Kashima). At Yokohama Dream Cinderella 2021 on April 4, MaiHime lost the Goddesses of Stardom Championship to fellow Donna Del Mondo stablemates Giulia and Syuri. Maika reached the finals of the 2021 Cinderella Tournament, where she lost to Saya Kamitani. She was also part of the Stardom 5 Star Grand Prix 2021 where she competed in the Block B. On October 9, Maika, Himeka and Natsupoi, later known together as MaiHimePoi, won the Artist of Stardom Championship by defeating Cosmic Angels (Mina Shirakawa, Tam Nakano and Unagi Sayaka). At Stardom 10th Anniversary Grand Final Osaka Dream Cinderella on October 9, MaiHimePoi defended the Artist of Stardom Championship against Queen's Quest (Momo Watanabe, AZM and Saya Kamitani). At the 2021 Goddesses of Stardom Tag League, Maika teamed up with Syuri as Ponytail and Samurai Road and fought in the Blue Goddess Block, where they scored a total of 6 points. At Tokyo Super Wars on November 27, Maika unsuccessfully challenged Utami Hayashishita for the World of Stardom Championship for a second time, and at Osaka Super Wars on December 18, MaiHimePoi won a ¥10 Million Unit Tournament by defeating Marvelous (Takumi Iroha, Rin Kadokura and Maria) in the semi-finals and Stars (Mayu Iwatani, Hazuki and Koguma) in the finals as a result of a six-woman tag team ladder match. Both of their matches were also for the Artist of Stardom Championship. At Dream Queendom on December 29, MaiHimePoi successfully defend the Artist of Stardom Championship against Cosmic Angels (Mina Shirakawa, Unagi Sayaka and Mai Sakurai).

At Nagoya Supreme Fight on January 29, 2022, MaiHime unsuccessfully challenged FWC for the Goddesses of Stardom Championship. In the 2022 Cinderella Tournament, Maika made it to the second rounds, where she and Saya Kamitani simultaneously eliminated each other from the competition over the top rope. At Golden Week Fight Tour on May 5, Maika unsuccessfully challenged Saya Kamitani for the Wonder of Stardom Championship. At Flashing Champions on May 28, MaiHimePoi lost the Artist of Stardom Championship to Oedo Tai (Starlight Kid, Momo Watanabe and Saki Kashima). At Fight in the Top on June 26, Maika teamed up with Giulia and Mai Sakurai to challenge again for the Artist of Stardom Championship, this time in a three-way match also involving God's Eye (Syuri, Ami Sourei and Mirai). At Mid Summer Champions in Nagoya on July 24, Maika teamed up with Giulia and Himeka and unsuccessfully challenged Oedo Tai (Starlight Kid, Momo Watanabe and Saki Kashima) for the Artist of Stardom Championship. In the 2022 5 Star Grand Prix, Maika fought in the Red Stars Block, where she scored a total of 15 points. At Hiroshima Goddess Festival on November 3, Maika unsuccessfully challenged Syuri for the World of Stardom Championship.

At Flashing Champions 2023 on May 27, 2023, Maika teamed up with Mei Seira and Suzu Suzuki to defeat Neo Stardom Army (Nanae Takahashi and Yuna Mizumori) and Hanako. Following this, Maika would continue to frequently team up with Seira and Suzuki. In July through September, Maika competed in the 2023 5 Star Grand Prix, in which she lost to Suzu Suzuki in the finals. From October 15 to November 12, Maika and Megan Bayne, together known as Divine Kingdom, competed in the 2023 Goddesses of Stardom Tag League. They won the tournament by defeating CRAZY STAR (Mei Seira and Suzu Suzuki) in the finals. At Dream Queendom 2023, Maika won the vacant World of Stardom Championship by defeating Suzu Suzuki. At Ittenyon Stardom Gate on January 4, 2024, Donna Del Mondo was disbanded and Maika became unitless.

==== Empress Nexus Venus (2024–present) ====
On January 20, 2024, Maika, Hanako, Mina Shirakawa, Waka Tsukiyama and Xena reformed Club Venus into a new stable, with Maika and Shirakawa being the co-leaders. On January 27, the new stable was given the name Empress Nexus Venus. On March 30, Maika, Mina Shirakawa and Xena won the Artist of Stardom Championship by defeating Abarenbo GE.

=== New Japan Pro Wrestling (2021) ===
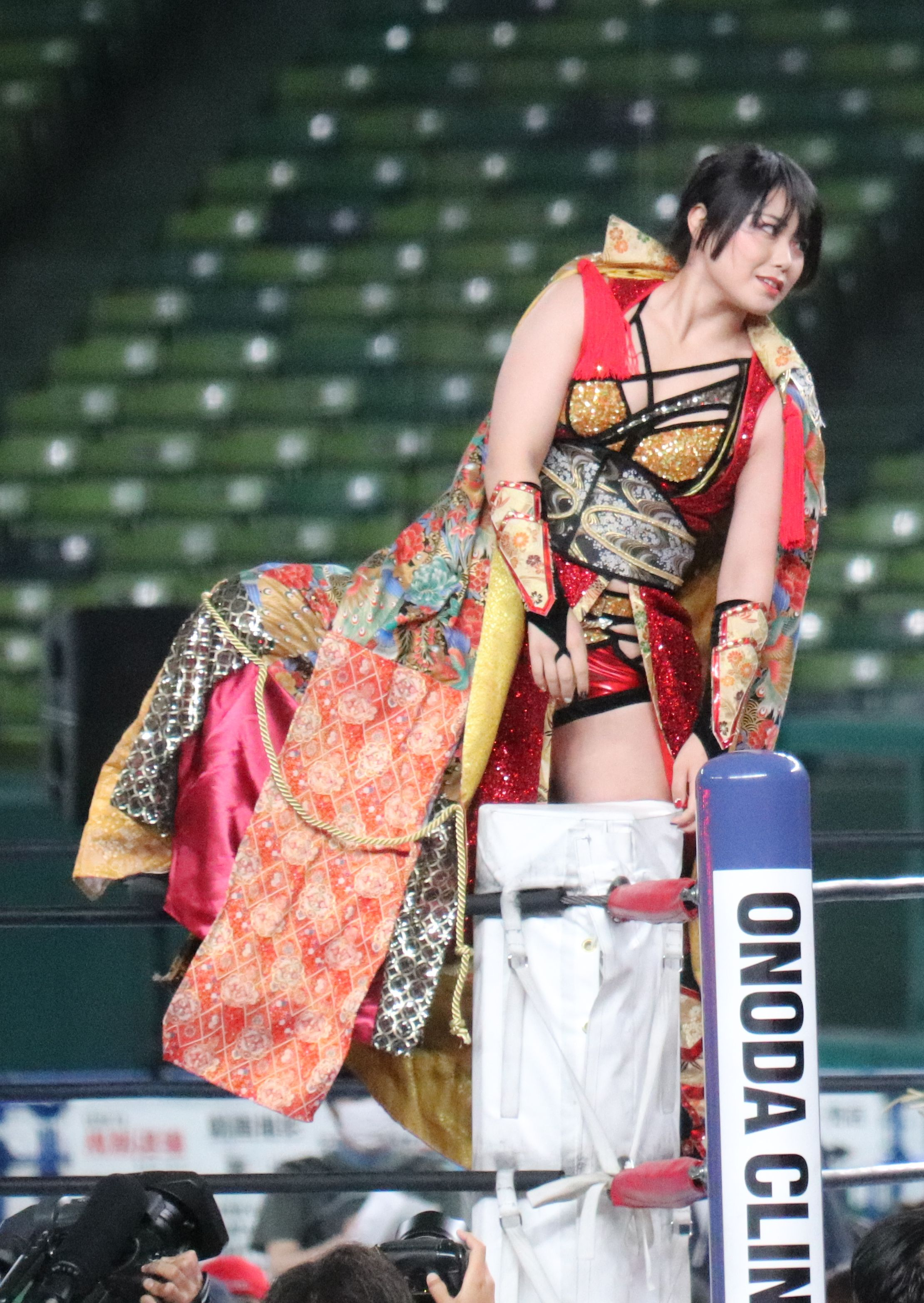
Maika on the first night of the Wrestle Grand Slam in MetLife Dome on September 4, 2021.

Maika was part of the series of exhibition matches to promote female talent hosted by New Japan Pro Wrestling. On the second night of Wrestle Kingdom 15, which took part on January 5, 2021, Maika teamed up with fellow stablemates Himeka and Natsupoi in a losing effort to Queen's Quest (AZM, Saya Kamitani, and Utami Hayashishita) in a six-woman tag team match. On the first night of Wrestle Grand Slam in MetLife Dome on September 4, Maika teamed up with Lady C in a losing effort to Queen's Quest (Saya Kamitani and Momo Watanabe).

== Championships and accomplishments ==
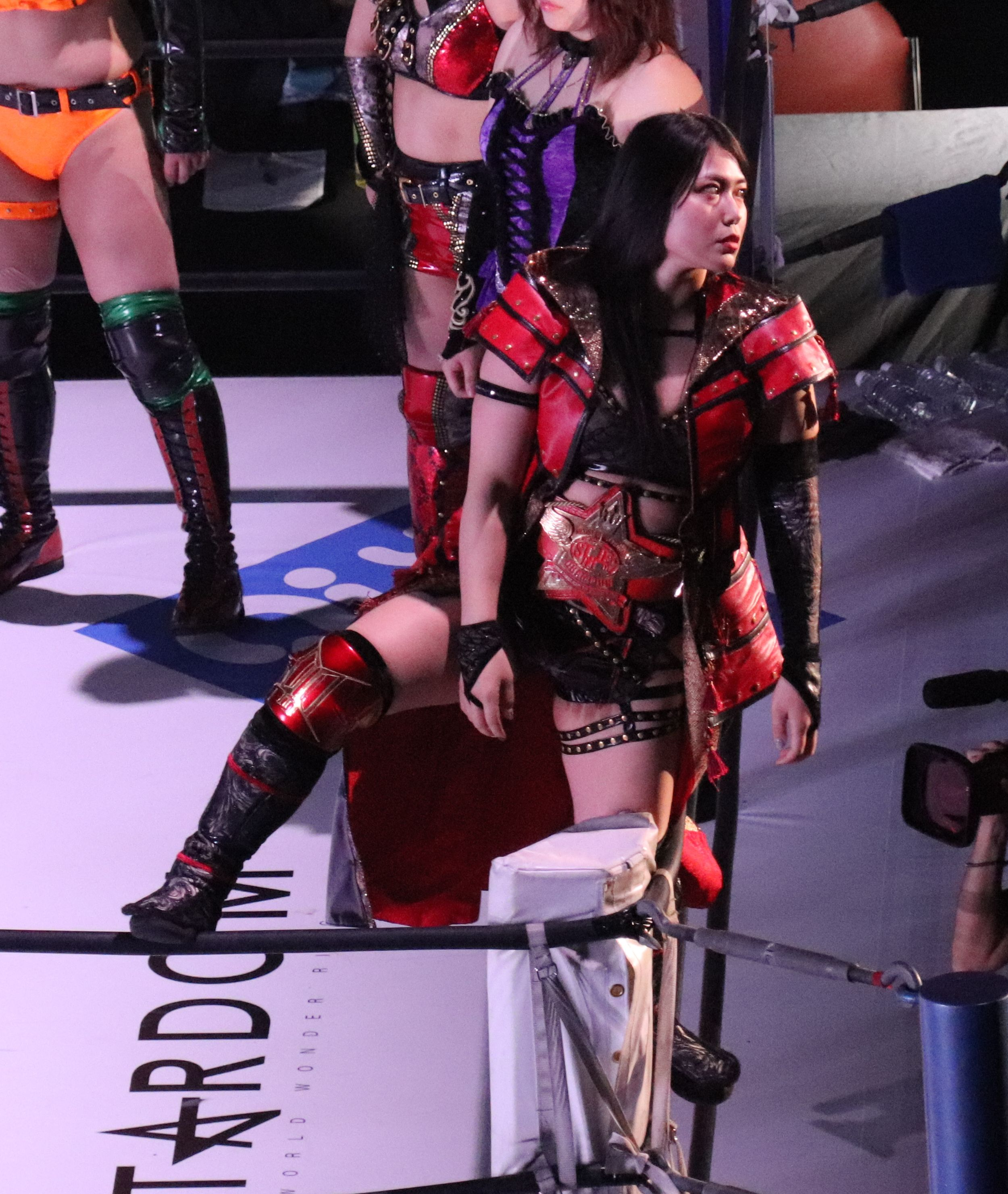
In Stardom, Maika is a three-time Artist of Stardom Champion...

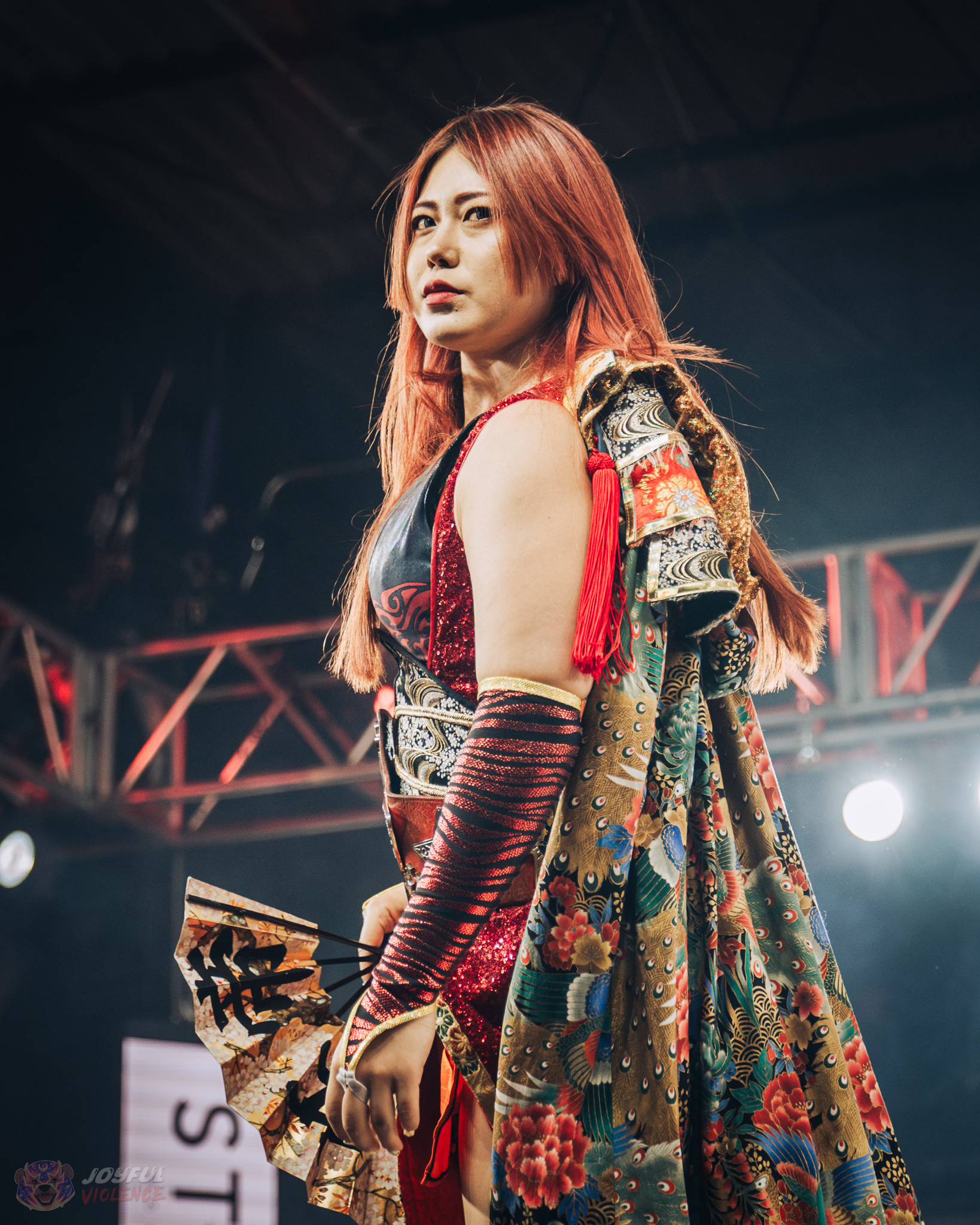
...and a one-time World of Stardom Champion.

- Pro-Wrestling: EVE
  - Pro-Wrestling: EVE Tag Team Championship (1 time, current) – with Hanako
- Pro Wrestling Illustrated
  - Ranked No. 4 of the top 250 female singles wrestlers in the PWI Women's 250 in 2024
- World Wonder Ring Stardom
  - World of Stardom Championship (1 time)
  - Artist of Stardom Championship (3 times) – with Giulia and Syuri (1), Himeka and Natsupoi (1), Mina Shirakawa and Xena (1)
  - Future of Stardom Championship (1 time)
  - Goddesses of Stardom Championship (1 time) – with Himeka
  - Goddesses of Stardom Tag League (2023) – with Megan Bayne
  - Stardom 5Star Grand Prix Tournament (2024)
  - 5★Star GP Awards (5 times)
    - Blue Stars Best Match Award (2023) vs. Mirai on September 30
    - Fighting Spirit Award (2020)
    - Red Stars Best Match Award (2022) vs. Himeka on October 1
    - Red Stars Best Match Award (2024) vs. Hazuki on August 23 in Red Stars A
    - 5★Star GP Red Stars Best Match Award (2026) vs. AZM on July 20 in Red Stars A
  - Stardom Year-End Awards (3 times)
    - Best Unit Award (2020) as part of Donna Del Mondo
    - Shining Award (2023)
    - MVP Award (2024)
