= Suzu Suzuki =

Japanese professional wrestler (born 2002)

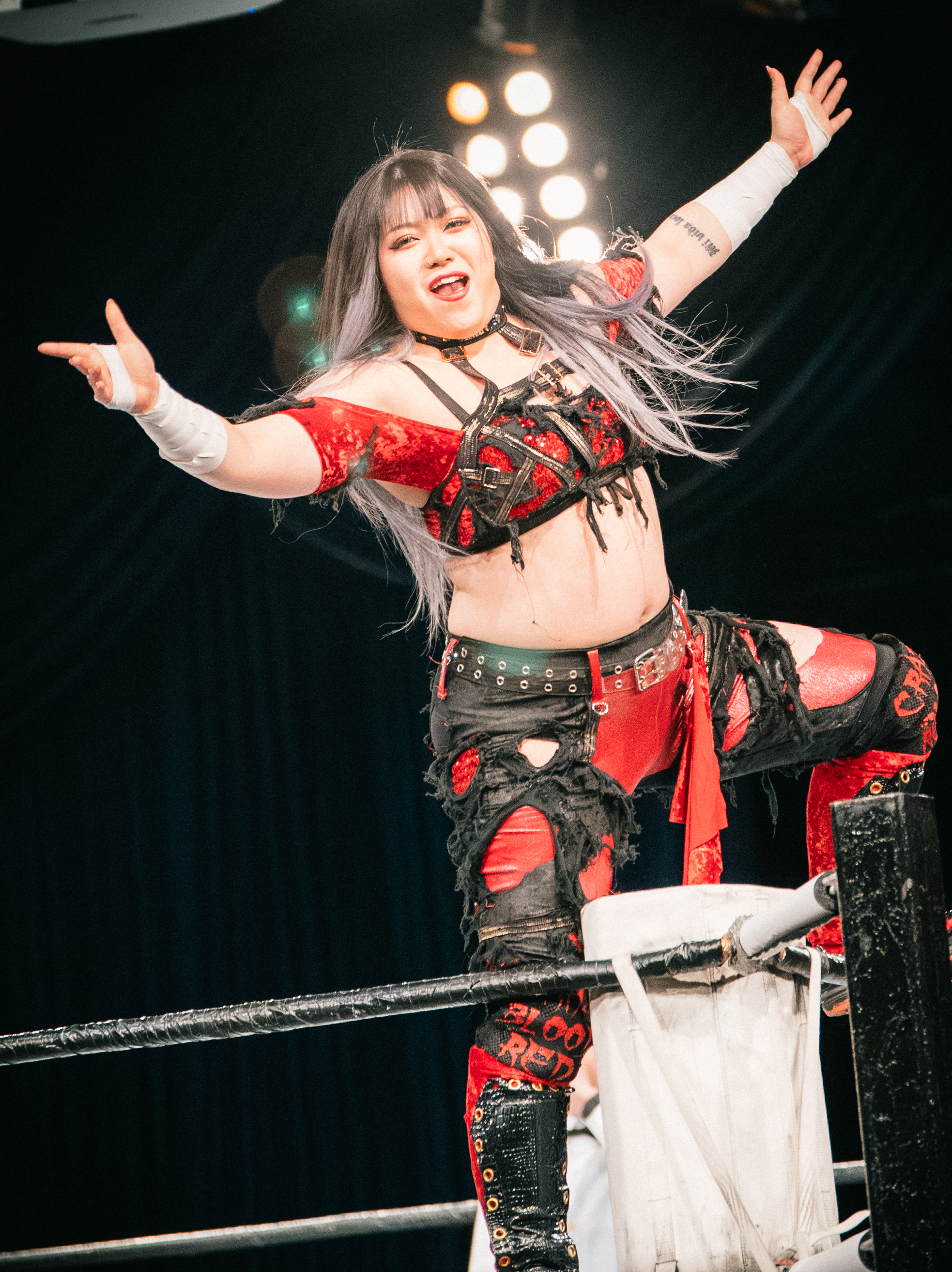
- Suzuki in April 2025

Personal information
- Born: September 16, 2002 (age 24) Miyazaki, Japan

Professional wrestling career
- Ring name(s): Suzu; Suzu Suzuki
- Billed height: 157 cm (5 ft 2 in)
- Billed weight: 65 kg (143 lb)
- Trained by: Tequila Saya
- Debut: 2018

Suzu Suzuki (鈴季すず, Suzuki Suzu; born September 16, 2002) is a Japanese professional wrestler signed to World Wonder Ring Stardom, where she is the current World of Stardom Champion in her first reign and the leader of Mi Vida Loca. She is best known for her time in Ice Ribbon and Pure-J, two Japanese professional wrestling promotions.

Suzuki is a former one-time Goddesses of Stardom Champion and one-time Artist of Stardom Champion and the winner of the 2023 5 Star Grand Prix.

== Professional wrestling career ==
=== Ice Ribbon (2018–2022) ===
Suzuki made her professional wrestling debut at Ice Ribbon's RibbonMania 2018 on December 31, 2018, where she picked up a victory against Asahi. At Yokohama Bunka Gymnasium Final from August 9, 2020, Suzuki defeated Maya Yukihi to win the ICE Cross Infinity Championship. On January 23, 2021, Suzuki lost the ICE Cross Infinity Championship to Tsukasa Fujimoto. Suzuki's contract with Ice Ribbon expired at the end of 2021.

=== Independent circuit (2018–present) ===
At the end of 2021, Suzuki aligned herself with Mochi Miyagi, Risa Sera, Akane Fujita and Hiragi Kurumi in the Prominence stable after their contract with Ice Ribbon expired, leaving them to wander as freelance wrestlers. On April 24, 2023, Suzuki announced that she was leaving Prominence.

=== Pro Wrestling Wave (2020, 2022-2023) ===
Suzuki made her Pro Wrestling Wave debut on July 1, 2020, in a tag team match in which she and Haruka Umesaki defeated Ayumi Hayashi and Crea.

Suzuki returned to Wave on February 13, 2022, in a tag team match where she and Risa Sera defeated Hibiscus Mii and Yuki Miyazaki. In May through July 2022, Suzuki competed in the 2022 Catch the Wave tournament. She competed in Future Block qualifier block, in which she scored six points and advanced to the Winners Block. In her Winner Block, Suzuki scored four points, which allowed to advance to the finals. On July 17, Suzuki won the tournament and became the Wave Single Champion by defeating Miyuki Takase in the finals. On August 14, Suzuki lost the Wave Single Championship to Hikaru Shida.

=== World Wonder Ring Stardom (2022–present) ===
==== Prominence (2022–2024) ====
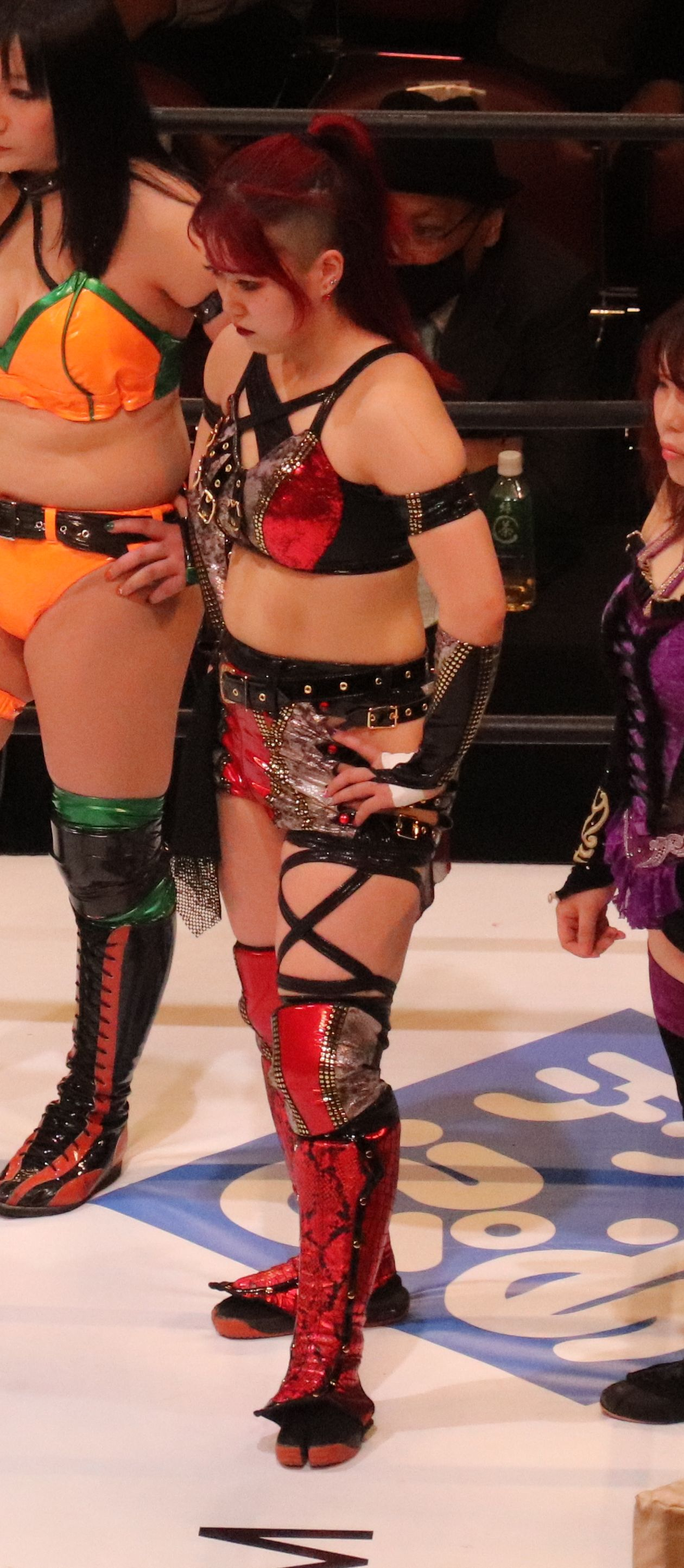
Suzuki on the second night of the Stardom World Climax 2022 of March 27.

Suzuki made her first appearance in World Wonder Ring Stardom at its first pay-per-view of 2022, Nagoya Supreme Fight, on January 29, where Prominence picked a fight with the Donna Del Mondo stable, subsequently starting a feud with them, especially against the unit's leader Giulia. On the first night of the World Climax 2022 on March 26, Suzuki teamed up with her Prominence stablemate Risa Sera to defeat Donna Del Mondo (Maika and Thekla). On the second night of the event from March 27, she teamed up with her stablemates Akane Fujita, Mochi Miyagi and Risa Sera in a losing effort against Donna Del Mondo (Giulia, Himeka, Maika and Thekla). At New Blood 2 on May 13, Suzuki picked up a victory over Mai Sakurai. At Stardom in Showcase vol.1 on July 23, she teamed up with Risa Sera to face Giulia and Mai Sakurai in a hardcore match, winning in a dominant fashion and continuing the Prominence/DDM feud. Suzuki competed in the 2022 Grand Prix, earning 15 points in the Blue Stars block, which was enough to reach the finals of her block on October 1, where she lost to Giulia. At Dream Queendom 2 on December 29, Suzuki teamed up with Risa Sera and Hiragi Kurumi and defeated Oedo Tai (Starlight Kid, Momo Watanabe and Saki Kashima) to win the Artist of Stardom Championship.

In January through March 2023, Suzuki teamed up with Prominence stablemates Hiragi Kurumi and Risa Sera to compete in the Triangle Blue block of the Triangle Derby I. On March 4, Prominence won the tournament by defeating Abarenbo GE in the finals. At All Star Grand Queendom on April 23, Prominence lost the Artist of Stardom Championship to REStart. On April 30, Suzuki teamed up with Mei Seira in a draw against Queen's Quest (AZM and Saya Kamitani). Following this, Suzuki and Seira would continue to frequently team with each other and later started to go by the team name Crazy Star. At Flashing Champions 2023 on May 27, Crazy Star teamed up with Maika to defeat Neo Stardom Army (Nanae Takahashi and Yuna Mizumori) and Hanako. Following this, Suzuki would continue to frequently team up with various members of Donna Del Mondo in tag team matches, especially Maika. In July through September, Suzuki competed in and won the 2023 5Star Grand Prix by defeating Maika in the finals. At Nagoya Golden Fight on October 9, Suzuki, Maika and Megan Bayne teamed up to challenge the Baribari Bombers for the Artist of Stardom Championship. During the match, there were several instances of miscommunication between Suzuki and Maika, which led to the Baribari Bombers winning. In an after-match promo, Maika blamed Suzuki for the loss and promised to defeat Suzuki, which effectively meant the end of Suzuki teaming with Donna Del Mondo. From October 15 to November 12, Crazy Star competed in the 2023 Goddesses of Stardom Tag League. They reached the finals, where they lost to Divine Kingdom (Maika and Megan Bayne).

On March 30, 2024, Crazy Star won the Goddesses of Stardom Championship by defeating AphroditE. On May 5, they lost the Goddesses of Stardom Championship to FWC.

==== Neo Genesis (2024–2025) ====
On July 25, 2024, Suzuki would team up with AZM, Starlight Kid, Miyu Amasaki, and Mei Seira, as they debuted their new formed unit, Neo Genesis, going on to defeat Hanan, Saya Iida, Hazuki, Koguma, and Momo Kohgo. After a few months, Suzu would then betray the unit due to tension with her stablemate, Mei Seira.

==== Mi Vida Loca (2025–present) ====
On April 24, 2025, Itsuki Aoki and Rina Yamashita were Suzuki's mystery partners, going on to defeat Mei Seira, Miyu Amasaki, and Kohaku at Korakuen Hall. After the match, Suzu would then announce a new faction called, Mi Vida Loca, along with Akira Kurogane joining the unit afterwards

On June 20, 2026 at The Conversion, Suzuki won the World of Stardom Championship, defeating Sayaka Kurara.

== Championships and accomplishments ==
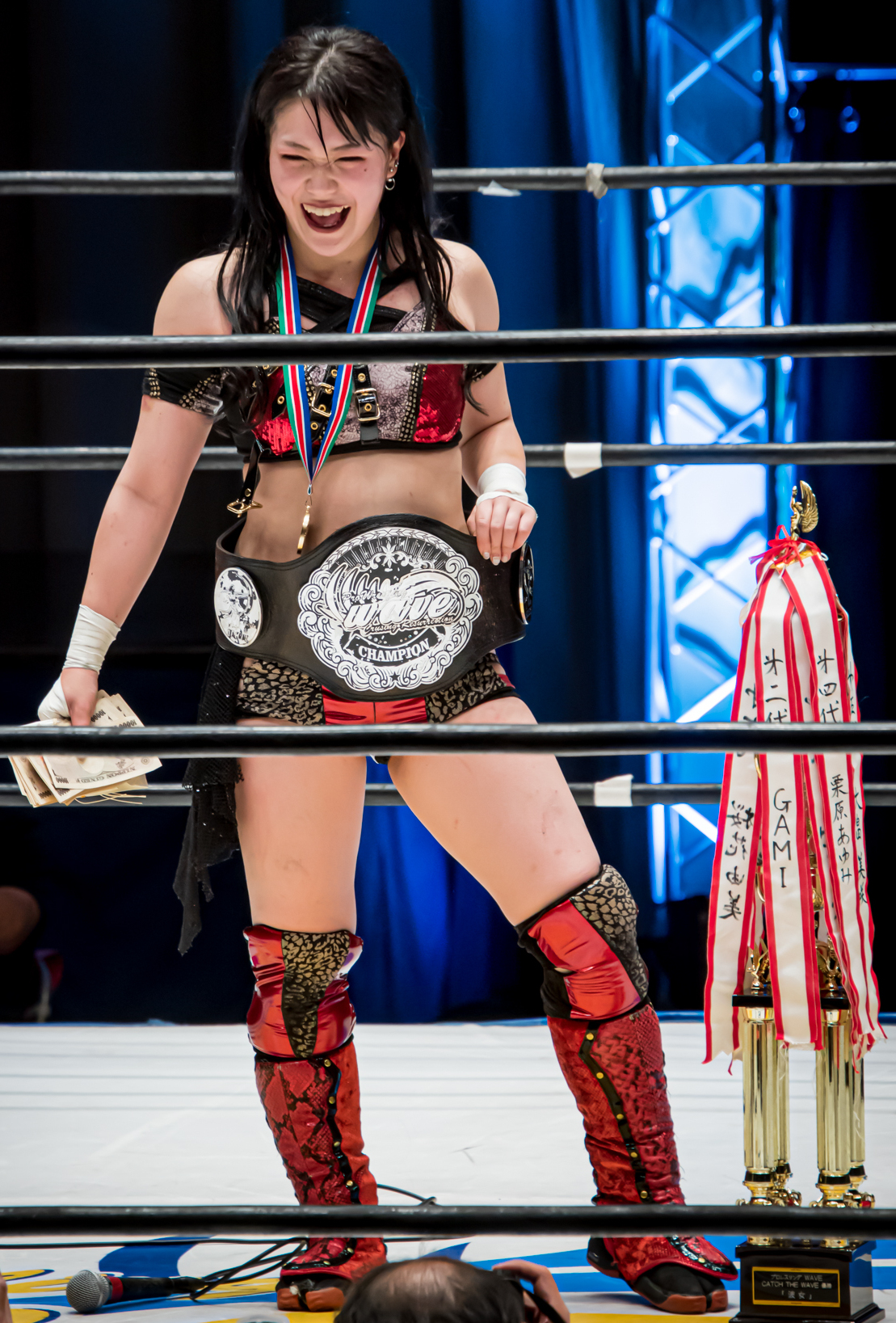
In Pro Wrestling Wave, Suzuki is a former Wave Single Champion.

- Ice Ribbon
  - ICE Cross Infinity Championship (1 time)
  - Ice Ribbon Year-End Awards
    - Best Bout Award (2020) vs. Maya Yukihi on August 9
    - MVP Award (2020)
    - Rookie Award (2019)
- Pro Wrestling Illustrated
  - Ranked No. 31 of the top 250 female singles wrestlers in the PWI Women's 250 in 2023
- Pro Wrestling Wave
  - Wave Single Championship (1 time)
  - Catch the Wave (2022)
- Pure-J
  - Princess of Pro Wrestling Championship (1 time)
- World Wonder Ring Stardom
  - World of Stardom Championship (1 time, current)
  - Goddesses of Stardom Championship (1 time) – Mei Seira
  - Artist of Stardom Championship (1 time) – with Hiragi Kurumi and Risa Sera
  - Triangle Derby (2023) – with Hiragi Kurumi and Risa Sera
  - 5★Star GP (2023)
  - 5★Star GP Awards (4 times)
    - Blue Stars Best Match Award (2022) vs. Saya Kamitani on September 11
    - Red Stars Best Match Award (2023) vs. Hazuki on September 23
    - Blue Stars Best Match Award (2024) vs. Thekla on August 20 in Blue Stars B
    - Outstanding Performance Award (2025)
  - Stardom Year-End Awards (1 times)
    - Fighting Spirit Award (2023)
