= Stardom Supreme Fight =

- Promotions: World Wonder Ring Stardom
- First event: Stardom Supreme Fight 2023

Stardom Supreme Fight (スターダム-スプリーム-ファイト, sutadamu-su puri ー mu-faito) is an annual professional wrestling event promoted by World Wonder Ring Stardom. Since its inception in 2023, Stardom Supreme Fight has been held on February 4 in Osaka, at the Osaka Prefectural Gymnasium.

== History ==
On December 31, 2022, Stardom announced that Stardom Supreme Fight 2023, the inaugural Stardom Supreme Fight, would take place on February 4, 2023. The event was the first pay-per-view hosted by Stardom with full spectator capacity during the COVID-19 pandemic in Japan. The second event, took place on February 4, 2024, and it was also the final event to feature Rossy Ogawa as the promotion's booker, establishing Supreme Fight as an annual event.

== Dates and venues ==
#	Event	Date	City	Attendance	Venue	Main Event	Ref
1	Stardom Supreme Fight 2023	February 4, 2023	Osaka, Japan	1,832	Osaka Prefectural Gymnasium	Giulia (c) defeated Suzu Suzuki to retain the World of Stardom Championship	
2	Stardom Supreme Fight 2024	February 4, 2024	Osaka, Japan	1,377	Osaka Prefectural Gymnasium	Maika (c) defeated Saya Kamitani to retain the World of Stardom Championship	
3	Stardom Supreme Fight 2025	February 2, 2025	Tokyo, Japan	1,614	Korakuen Hall	Saya Kamitani (c) defeated Suzu Suzuki to retain the World of Stardom Championship	
4	Stardom Supreme Fight 2026	February 7, 2026	Osaka, Japan	2,563	Osaka Prefectural Gymnasium	Saya Kamitani (c) defeated Starlight Kid to retain the World of Stardom Championship	
