= Stardom Supreme Fight 2024 =

2024 World Wonder Ring Stardom professional wrestling event

Stardom Supreme Fight
- Promotional poster of the event featuring various wrestlers
- Promotion: World Wonder Ring Stardom
- Date: February 4, 2024
- City: Osaka, Japan
- Venue: Osaka Prefectural Gymnasium
- Attendance: 1,377

Event chronology
← Previous; Ittenyon Stardom Gate	Next → Cinderella Tournament 2024

Supreme Fight chronology
← Previous; 2023	Next → 2025

Stardom Supreme Fight 2024 (スターダム-スプリーム-ファイト2024, sutadamu-su puri ー mu-faito 2024) was a professional wrestling event promoted by World Wonder Ring Stardom. The event took place on February 4, 2024, in Osaka, at the Osaka Prefectural Gymnasium. It was the second event in the Supreme Fight chronology. The event also portraited the 13th Anniversary of Stardom and was the final event to feature Rossy Ogawa as the promotion's booker.

Nine matches were contested at the event, including three on the pre-show, and four of Stardom's ten championships were on the line. The main event saw Maika successfully defend the World of Stardom Championship against Saya Kamitani. In another prominent match, Saori Anou defeated Starlight Kid to retain the Wonder of Stardom Championship.

== Production ==
=== Background ===
The show featured nine professional wrestling matches that result from scripted storylines, where wrestlers portrayed villains, heroes, or less distinguishable characters in the scripted events that built tension and culminated in a wrestling match or series of matches.

=== Event ===
The event started with three bouts broadcast on Stardom's YouTube channel. In the first one, Mai Sakurai picked up a victory over Ruaka, Hanako and Ranna Yagami in a four-way match. In the second one, Hanan and Saya Iida defeated Ami Sohrei and Saki Kashima in tag team action. In the third preshow match, Rina defeated Yuzuki to secure the fifth defense of the Future of Stardom Championship in that respective reign.

In the first main card bout, Natsuko Tora and Momo Watanabe defeated Lady C and Miyu Amasaki in tag team action. In the fifth bout of the event, Tam Nakano and Yuna Mizumori defeated Mina Shirakawa and Waka Tsukiyama in Nakano's return match. In the sixth bout, Mei Seira and Hazuki wrestled into a time-limit draw in a bout contested for the High Speed Championship. Seira therefore secured the fourth consecutive defense of the title in that respective reign. Next up, one half of the Goddesses of Stardom Champions Utami Hayashishita, IWGP Women's Champion Mayu Iwatani, AZM and Nanae Takahashi defeated two thirds of the Artist of Stardom Champions Syuri and Mirai, Strong Women's Champion Giulia and Suzu Suzuki in an eight-woman tag team match. In the semi main event, Saori Anou defeated Starlight Kid to secure the first defense of the Wonder of Stardom Championship in that respective reign. During the event, Natsuko Tora challenged Giulia for the Strong Women's Championship and Mina Shirakawa laid a challenge for Mayu Iwatani's IWGP Women's Championship in a bout which was scheduled for The New Beginning in Sapporo on February 23, 2024.

In the main event, Maika defeated Saya Kamitani to secure the first defense of the World of Stardom Championship in that respective reign. After the bout concluded, Maika nominated Tam Nakano as her next title contender, continuing the story from before Nakano getting injured and having to relinquish the "red belt".

== Results ==
No.	Results	Stipulations	Times
1^{P}	Mai Sakurai defeated Ruaka, Hanako and Ranna Yagami	Four-way match	5:09
2^{P}	wing★gori (Hanan and Saya Iida) defeated God's Eye (Ami Sohrei and Saki Kashima)	Tag team match	5:53
3^{P}	Rina (c) defeated Yuzuki	Singles match for the Future of Stardom Championship	9:08
4	XL (Natsuko Tora and Momo Watanabe) defeated Queen's Quest (Lady C and Miyu Amasaki)	Six-woman tag team match	6:07
5	Tropikano (Tam Nakano and Yuna Mizumori) defeated Moonlight Venus (Mina Shirakawa and Waka Tsukiyama)	Tag team match	12:43
6	Mei Seira (c) vs. Hazuki ended in a time-limit draw	Singles match for the High Speed Championship	15:00
7	Queen's Quest (AZM and Utami Hayashishita), Mayu Iwatani and Nanae Takahashi defeated God's Eye (Syuri and Mirai), Giulia and Suzu Suzuki	Eight-woman tag team match	20:51
8	Saori Anou (c) defeated Starlight Kid	Singles match for Wonder of Stardom Championship	17:42
9	Maika (c) defeated Saya Kamitani	Singles match for the World of Stardom Championship	21:36
(c) / – the champion(s) heading into the match; P / – the match was broadcast on the pre-show
