= Stardom Supreme Fight 2023 =

2023 World Wonder Ring Stardom professional wrestling event

Stardom Supreme Fight
- Promotional poster of the event featuring Giulia and Suzu Suzuki
- Promotion: World Wonder Ring Stardom
- Date: February 4, 2023
- City: Osaka, Japan
- Venue: Osaka Prefectural Gymnasium
- Attendance: 1,832

Event chronology
← Previous; New Blood 7	Next → Stardom in Showcase vol.4

Supreme Fight chronology
← Previous; First	Next → 2024

Stardom Supreme Fight 2023 (スターダム-スプリーム-ファイト2023, sutadamu-su puri ー mu-faito 2023) was a professional wrestling event promoted by World Wonder Ring Stardom. The event took place on February 4, 2023 in Osaka, at the Osaka Prefectural Gymnasium. This was the inaugural event in the Supreme Fight chronology.

Professional wrestling events have been held with a limited attendance since the beginning of the COVID-19 pandemic in Japan. However, on January 30, 2023, the Japanese government voted to lift crowd size limits and mandatory masks for attendees. The event was the first pay-per-view hosted by Stardom with full spectator capacity during the pandemic.

== Production ==
=== Background ===
The show featured seven professional wrestling matches that result from scripted storylines, where wrestlers portrayed villains, heroes, or less distinguishable characters in the scripted events that built tension and culminated in a wrestling match or series of matches. The event's press conference where the matches were officially announced took place on January 11, 2023, and was broadcast on Stardom's YouTube channel.

=== Event ===
The preshow roulette match was broadcast on Stardom's YouTube channel. Since the main prize was competing for the title of her choice, the winner Saki Kashima chose the High Speed Championship. The first match of the main card saw Classmates (Hazuki, Saya Iida and Koguma) picking a victory over Unique Glare (Starlight Kid, Karma and Ruaka) in a Triangle Derby group stage match. Next, Syuri, Ami Sourei and a returning Konami defeated Utami Hayashishita, AZM and Lady C. The fourth match portraited the singles competition between Mirai and Sendai Girls' Pro Wrestling Chihiro Hashimoto. Holding a grudge against Syuri since a couple of years, Hashimoto invaded Stardom weeks before the event and challenged the God's Eye's leader to a fight, challenge responded by Mirai instead. The bout concluded with the victory of Hashimoto. Next up, 7Upp (Nanae Takahashi and Yuu) defeated MaiHime (Maika and Himeka) to secure their first defense of the Goddesses of Stardom Championship. After the match, they received a challenge from BMI 2000 (Ruaka and Natsuko Tora). In the semi main event, Saya Kamitani defeated Momo Watanabe to secure the fourteenth consecutive defense of the Wonder of Stardom Championship, establishing a new record at the time, previously held by Watanabe herself with thirteen defenses.

In the main event, Giulia defeated one third of the Artist of Stardom Champions Suzu Suzuki to successfully retain the World of Stardom Championship for the first time in that respective reign. Both Giulia and Suzuki continued their feud based on Giulia's departure from Ice Ribbon.

== Results ==
No.	Results	Stipulations	Times
1^{P}	Saki Kashima won by last eliminating Billiken Death	Naniwa Roulette Single Elimination Tournament to determine the #1 contender to any Stardom championship (Note: Opponents were chosen by roulette in an elimination tournament. Five minutes, one fall, a draw meant both wrestlers were eliminated, over the top rope rules was in effect.)	31:52
2	Classmates (Hazuki, Saya Iida and Koguma) defeated Unique Glare (Starlight Kid, Karma and Ruaka)	Triangle Derby group stage match	9:03
3	Abarenbo GE (Syuri, Ami Sourei and Konami) defeated Queen's Quest (Utami Hayashishita, AZM and Lady C)	Six-woman tag team match	11:25
4	Chihiro Hashimoto defeated Mirai	Singles match	15:18
5	7Upp (Nanae Takahashi and Yuu) (c) defeated MaiHime (Maika and Himeka)	Tag team match for the Goddesses of Stardom Championship	18:54
6	Saya Kamitani (c) defeated Momo Watanabe	Singles match for Wonder of Stardom Championship	16:38
7	Giulia (c) defeated Suzu Suzuki	Singles match for the World of Stardom Championship	25:04
(c) / – the champion(s) heading into the match; P / – the match was broadcast on the pre-show

=== Naniwa roulette match ===
Draw	Entrant	Order	Eliminated by	Method	Elim(s)
1	Mayu Iwatani	4	Themselves	Draw	3
2	Waka Tsukiyama	1	Mayu Iwatani	Pin	0
3	Momo Kohgo	2	Mayu Iwatani	Pin	0
4	Miyu Amasaki	3	Mayu Iwatani	Pin	0
5	Tam Nakano	5	Themselves	Draw	0
6	Mina Shirakawa	6	Themselves	Draw	0
7	Natsupoi	7	Themselves	Draw	0
8	Mariah May	9	Themselves	OTR (Note: Over the top rope elimination.)	1
9	Mai Sakurai	8	Mariah May	Pin	0
10	Thekla	10	Themselves	OTR	0
11	Natsuko Tora	11	Themselves	OTR	0
12	Momoka Hanazono	12	Themselves	OTR	0
13	Billiken Death (Note: Yoneyama portraited her usual "death" pet gimmick but with a reference to Billiken charm doll.)	14	Saki Kashima	Pin	1
14	Yuna Mizumori	13	Billiken Death	Pin	0
15	Saki Kashima	–	Winner	–	1
