= Stardom Supreme Fight 2026 =

2025 World Wonder Ring Stardom professional wrestling event

Stardom Supreme Fight
- Promotional poster of the event
- Promotion: World Wonder Ring Stardom
- Date: February 7, 2026
- City: Osaka, Japan
- Venue: Edion Arena Osaka
- Attendance: 2,563

Event chronology
← Previous; New Blood 29	Next → Cinderella Tournament 2026

Supreme Fight chronology
← Previous; 2025	Next → —

Stardom Supreme Fight in Osaka 2026 (スターダム旗揚げ15周年記念 2026) was a professional wrestling event promoted by World Wonder Ring Stardom. The event took place on February 7, 2026, in Osaka at the Edition Arena Osaka. It was the fourth event in the Supreme Fight chronology.

In the main event, Saya Kamitani defeated Starlight Kid to retain the World of Stardom Championship.

== Production ==
=== Background ===
The show featured professional wrestling matches that result from scripted storylines, where wrestlers portray villains, heroes, or less distinguishable characters in the scripted events that built tension and culminated in a wrestling match or series of matches.

=== Event ===
The event featured four preshow matches. In the first one, Momo Kohgo picked up a victory over High Speed Champion Yuna Mizumori, Lady C, Kiyoka Kotatsu and Azusa Inaba in five-way competition. In the second one, Hina, Tomoka Inaba and Ranna Yagami outmatched Sayaka Kurara, Anne Kanaya and Kikyo Furusawa in six-woman tag team competition. Next up, Rina defeated Fuwa-chan in singles competition, and in the fourth, Maki Itoh defeated Aya Sakura to retain the unsanctioned "Kawaii of Kawaii Championship".

In the first main card bout, AZM and Miyu Amasaki picked up a victory over Saya Iida and Yuria Hime, Natsupoi and Saori Anou, and Hazuki and Biliken Death in four-way tag team competition. In the seventh bout, Suzu Suzuki, Rina Yamashita, Itsuki Aoki, and Akira Kurogane defeated Maika, Hanako, Xena, Waka Tsukiyama and Rian in a 5-on-4 handicap unit disbanding elimination match, thus, having the unit of Empress Nexus Venus dissmantled. Next up, Natsuko Tora and Ruaka defeated Hanan and Bea Priestley to secure the fifth consecutive defense of the Goddesses of Stardom Championship in that respective reign. In the semi main event, Konami defeated Ami Sohrei to secure the third consecutive defense of the Wonder of Stardom Championship in that respective reign. After the bout concluded, Konami was challenged by Hina.

In the main event, Saya Kamitani defeated Starlight Kid to secure the ninth consecutive defense of the World of Stardom Championship in that respective reign. After the bout concluded, Kamitani was challenged by Sayaka Kurara.

== Results ==
No.	Results	Stipulations	Times
1^{P}	Momo Kohgo defeated Lady C, Yuna Mizumori, Kiyoka Kotatsu and Azusa Inaba by pinfall	Five-way match	6:27
2^{P}	God's Eye (Hina, Tomoka Inaba and Ranna Yagami) defeated Sayaka Kurara, Anne Kanaya and Kikyo Furusawa by pinfall	Six-woman tag team match	11:29
3^{P}	Rina defeated Fuwa-chan by pinfall	Singles match	13:22
4^{P}	Maki Itoh (c) defeated Aya Sakura by pinfall	Singles match for Itoh's Kawaii of Kawaii Championship	12:06
5	02line (AZM and Miyu Amasaki) defeated Stars (Saya Iida and Yuria Hime), Natsu&Saori (Natsupoi and Saori Anou) and Hazuki and Biliken Death by pinfall	Four-way tag team match	9:21
6	Syuri defeated Saki Kashima by pinfall	Singles match	7:06
7	Mi Vida Loca (Suzu Suzuki, Rina Yamashita, Itsuki Aoki, and Akira Kurogane) defeated Empress Nexus Venus (Maika, Hanako, Xena, Waka Tsukiyama and Rian) by pinfall	5-on-4 handicap unit disbanding elimination match Participants faced in 10-minute singles bouts having the loser eliminated, with the last woman standing winning the match.	34:34
8	BMI2000 (Natsuko Tora and Ruaka) (c) defeated Stars (Hanan and Bea Priestley) by pinfall	Tag team match for the Goddesses of Stardom Championship	15:04
9	Konami (c) defeated Ami Sohrei by pinfall	Singles match for the Wonder of Stardom Championship	19:04
10	Saya Kamitani (c) defeated Starlight Kid by pinfall	Singles match for the World of Stardom Championship	27:26
(c) / – the champion(s) heading into the match; P / – the match was broadcast on the pre-show
