= Stardom Supreme Fight 2025 =

2025 World Wonder Ring Stardom professional wrestling event

Stardom Supreme Fight
- Promotional poster of the event featuring Saya Kamitani and Suzu Suzuki
- Promotion: World Wonder Ring Stardom
- Date: February 2, 2025
- City: Tokyo, Japan
- Venue: Korakuen Hall
- Attendance: 1,614

Event chronology
← Previous; Wrestle Dynasty	Next → New Blood 18

Supreme Fight chronology
← Previous; 2024	Next → 2026

Stardom Supreme Fight 2025 (スターダム-スプリーム-ファイト2025, sutadamu-su puri ー mu-faito 2025) was a professional wrestling event promoted by World Wonder Ring Stardom. The event took place on February 2, 2025, in Tokyo at the Korakuen Hall. It was the third event in the Supreme Fight chronology. The event was also portrait the 14th Anniversary of Stardom.

Eight matches were contested at the event, including one on the pre-show, and two of Stardom's ten championships were on the line. The main event saw Saya Kamitani defeat Suzu Suzuki to retain the World of Stardom Championship. In another prominent match, Neo Genesis (AZM, Starlight Kid and Miyu Amasaki) defeated Cosmic Angels (Saori Anou, Tam Nakano and Natsupoi) to win the Artist of Stardom Championship.

== Production ==
=== Background ===
The show featured professional wrestling matches that result from scripted storylines, where wrestlers portrayed villains, heroes, or less distinguishable characters in the scripted events that built tension and culminated in a wrestling match or series of matches.

=== Event ===
The event started with the preshow singles confrontation between Akira Kurogane and Yuria Hime which ended into a time-limit draw.

Next up, Momo Watanabe, Thekla, Rina and Azusa Inaba picked up a victory over Maika, Mina Shirakawa, Waka Tsukiyama and Hanako in eight-woman tag team competition. The third bout saw Lady C and Hina defeat Mei Seira and Rian in tag team competition. Next up, Koguma defeated Ranna Yagami in a special singles bout. In the fifth match, Natsuko Tora, Ruaka and Fukigen Death outmatched Yuna Mizumori, Aya Sakura and Kurara Sayaka in six-woman tag team competition. The sixth bout saw Syuri, Saki Kashima, Tomoka Inaba and Kiyoka Kotatsu defeat Mayu Iwatani, Hazuki, Hanan and Momo Kohgo in eight-woman tag team competition. In the semi main event, AZM, Starlight Kid and Miyu Amasaki defeated Saori Anou, Tam Nakano and Natsupoi to win the Artist of Stardom Championship, ending the latter team's reign at 182 days and two defenses.

In the main event, Saya Kamitani defeated Suzu Suzuki to secure the first successful defense of the World of Stardom Championship in that respective reign.

== Results ==
No.	Results	Stipulations	Times
1^{P}	Akira Kurogane vs. Yuria Hime ended in a time-limit draw	Singles match	5:00
2	H.A.T.E. (Momo Watanabe, Thekla, Rina and Azusa Inaba) defeated Empress Nexus Venus (Maika, Mina Shirakawa, Waka Tsukiyama and Hanako)	Eight-woman tag team match	12:20
3	God's Eye (Lady C and Hina) defeated Mei Seira and Rian	Tag team match	10:06
4	Koguma defeated Ranna Yagami	Singles match Since Koguma won, Yagami had to perform Koguma's signature bear pose. If Yagami won, Koguma could no longer try and make anyone in God's Eye do the pose.	11:16
5	H.A.T.E. (Natsuko Tora, Ruaka and Fukigen Death) defeated Cosmic Angels (Yuna Mizumori, Aya Sakura and Sayaka Kurara)	Six-woman tag team match	7:41
6	God's Eye (Syuri, Saki Kashima, Tomoka Inaba and Kiyoka Kotatsu) defeated Stars (Mayu Iwatani, Hazuki, Hanan and Momo Kohgo)	Eight-woman tag team match	11:51
7	Neo Genesis (AZM, Starlight Kid and Miyu Amasaki) defeated Cosmic Angels (Saori Anou, Tam Nakano and Natsupoi) (c)	Six-woman tag team match for the Artist of Stardom Championship	18:12
8	Saya Kamitani (c) defeated Suzu Suzuki	Singles match for the World of Stardom Championship	18:23
(c) / – the champion(s) heading into the match; P / – the match was broadcast on the pre-show
