= Saya Kamitani =

Japanese professional wrestler (born 1996)

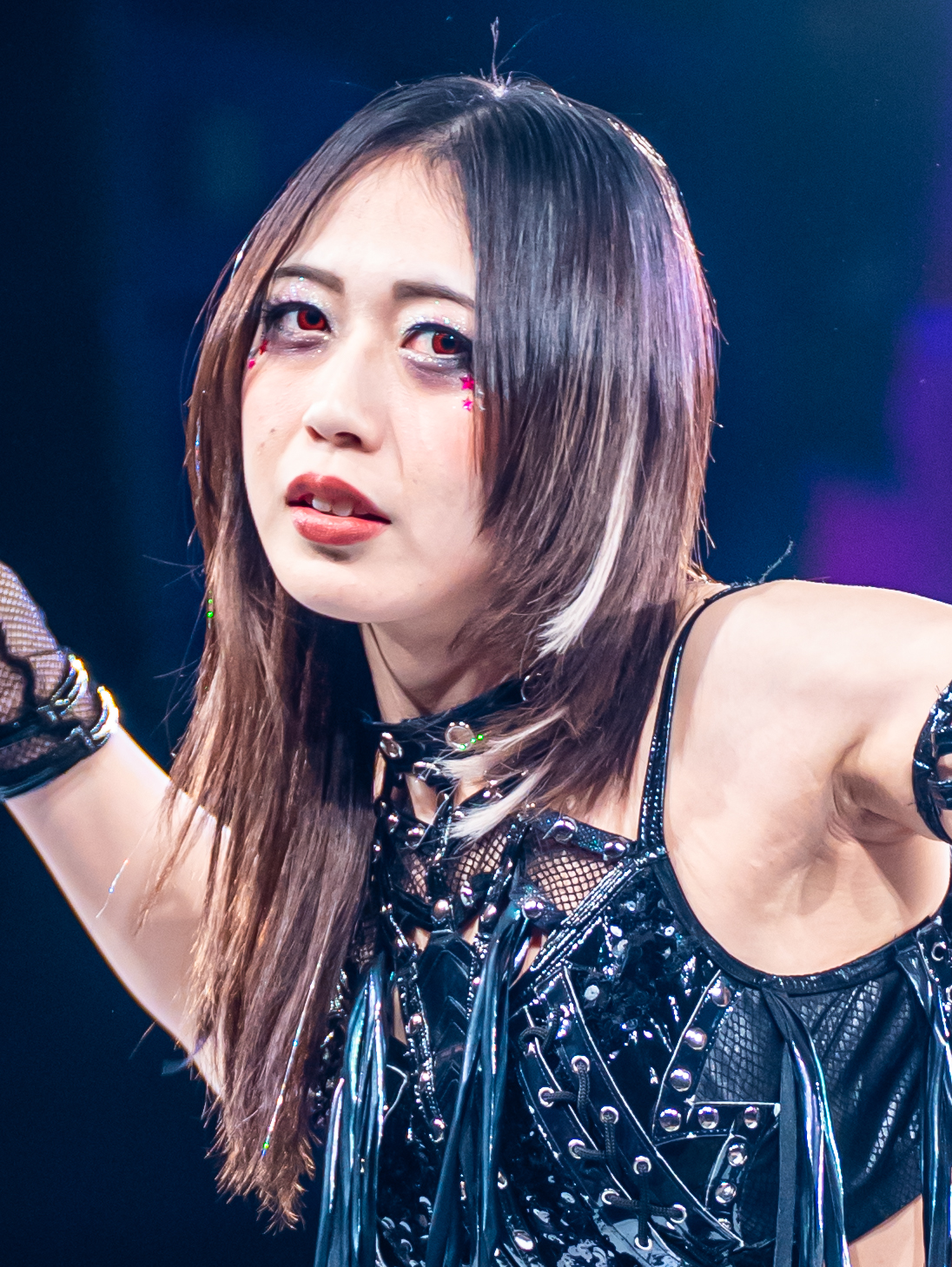
- Kamitani in January 2025

Personal information
- Born: Saya Kamitani (上谷 沙弥, Kamitani Saya); November 28, 1996 (age 29) Kanagawa Prefecture, Japan

Professional wrestling career
- Ring name: Saya Kamitani
- Billed height: 1.68 m (5 ft 6 in)
- Billed weight: 58 kg (128 lb)
- Trained by: Kagetsu; Tam Nakano
- Debut: August 10, 2019 vs Momo Watanabe

Saya Kamitani (上谷沙弥, Kamitani Saya; born November 28, 1996) is a Japanese professional wrestler and former idol. She is signed to World Wonder Ring Stardom, where she is a member of the villainous H.A.T.E. stable.

Kamitani is a former World of Stardom Champion, a Wonder of Stardom Champion, a High Speed Champion, a two-time Goddesses of Stardom Champion, and the 2021 Cinderella Tournament winner. She was the Pro Wrestling Wave 2024 Catch the Wave winner and is a former Regina di Wave champion. In New Japan Pro Wrestling, she is a former Strong Women's Champion.

She briefly led the Queen's Quest stable between June and July 2024.

== Early life ==
From elementary school through to high school, Kamitani belonged to dance school EXPG, where she practiced Hip-hop dance.

In middle school, Kamitani won a Japan dance competition, in which she qualified for the World Hip Hop Dance Championship in 2009 held in Las Vegas, USA, placing 2nd in the junior division.

In 2014, Kamitani also worked as a support dancer for boy band EXILE.

In September 2014, Kamitani was selected to join "Baito AKB", a collaboration project between job search platform Baitoru and idol group AKB48. where she also experienced being a backing dancer for Team A's theater performances and participated in rehearsals for the Kohaku Uta Gassen. The group disbanded in February 2015.

After Baito AKB disbanded, Kamitani failed many auditions to join idol groups, including the final round of the NGT48 audition. Her parents submitted an application to an Ohta Production acting workshop audition without her knowledge in which she passed. While at Ohta Production, Kamitani passed the audition for a project that combined idols and professional wrestling, where she was scouted by Tam Nakano and subsequently became part of "Stardom Idols".

She announced her departure from Ohta Production in 2021.

== Professional wrestling career ==
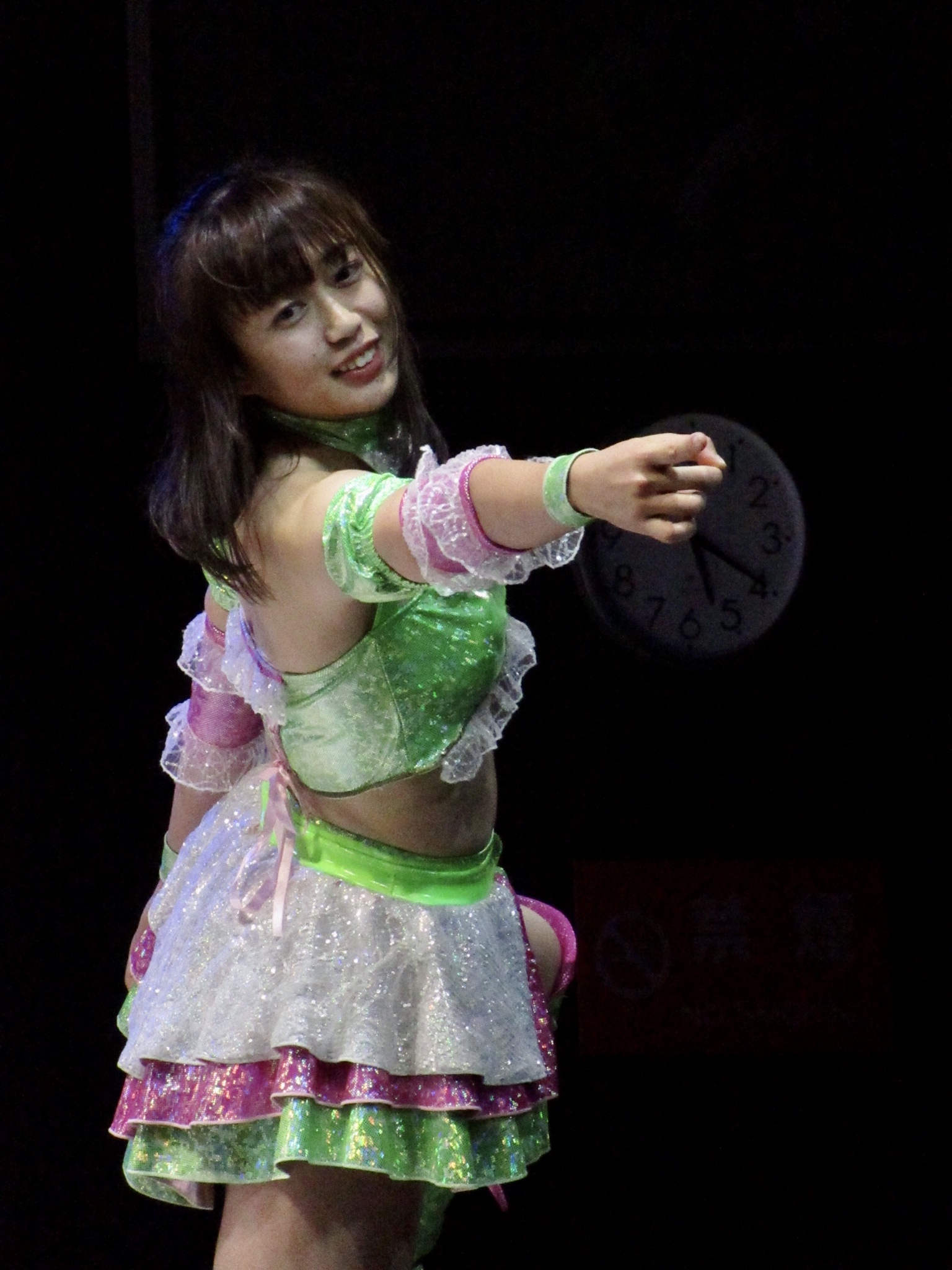
Kamitani in 2019.

=== World Wonder Ring Stardom (2018–present) ===
==== Early career (2018–2020) ====
Kamitani debuted in World Wonder Ring Stardom originally in a non-wrestling role as part of the Stardom Idols, a dancing and singing group. On February 11, 2019 at a Stardom Idols event, she participated in a 3 vs 1 handicap match against Miss Mongol, losing in 49 seconds. While the Stardom Idols were short-lived, Kamitani passed Stardom's pro-test on July 10, 2019.

Kamitani made her official wrestling debut on August 10, 2019 at Korakuen Hall, where she unsuccessfully challenged Momo Watanabe. On August 18, Kamitani gained her first victory when she teamed with Rina to defeat Queen's Quest (Hina and Leo Onozaki). Kamitani competed in the 2019 Goddesses of Stardom Tag League together with Saya Iida as the 3838 Tag.

On December 8, Kamitani won the 2019 Rookie of the Year Tournament by defeating Saya Iida in the finals.

==== Queen's Quest (2020–2024) ====
On February 16, 2020, Kamitani joined Queen's Quest after a loss to Utami Hayashishita. On July 17, Kamitani lost in a three-way match against Saya Iida and Maika for the Future of Stardom Championship. At the 2020 Cinderella Tournament on April 29, Kamitani fell short to Natsuko Tora in the first round.

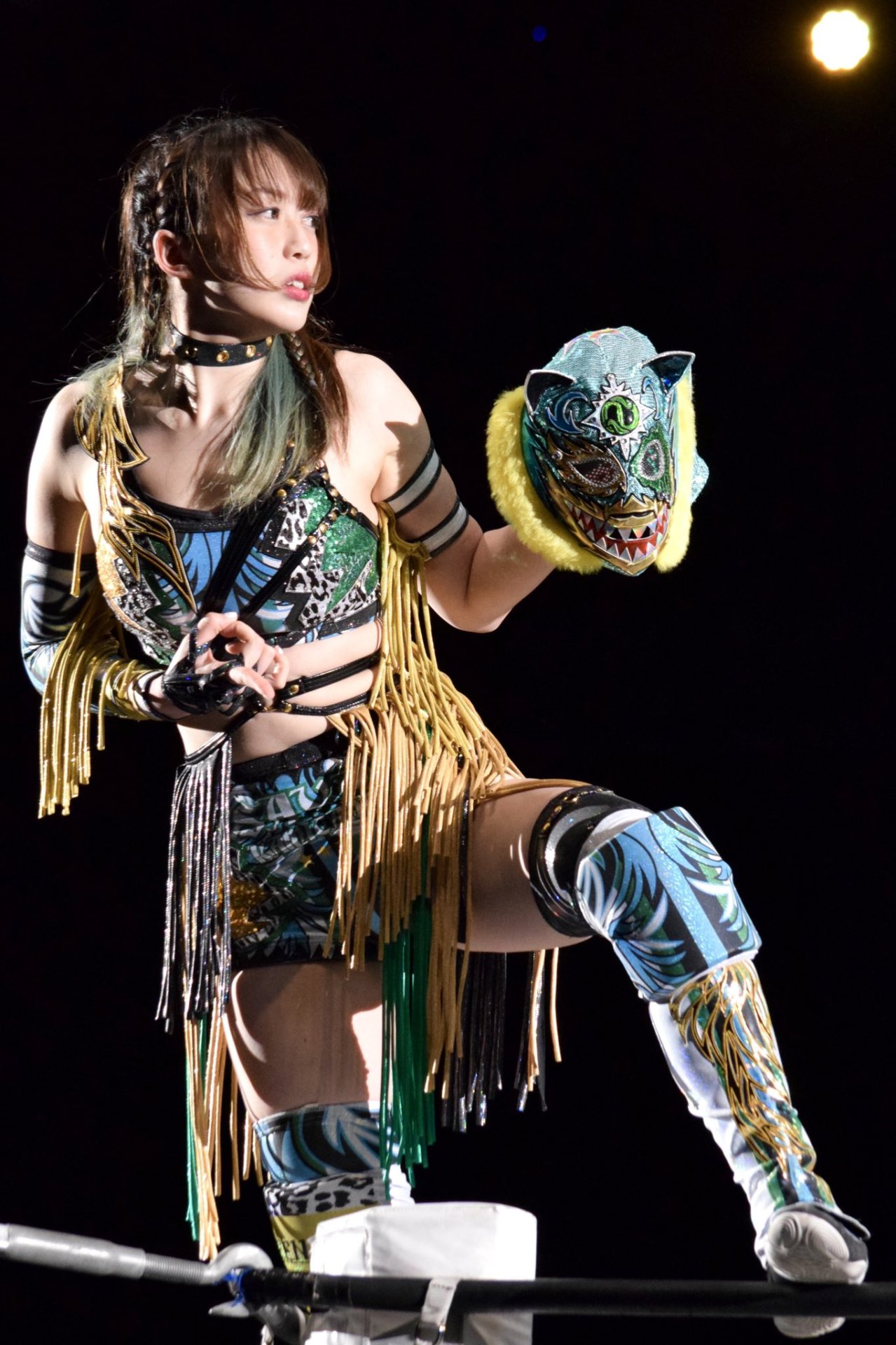
Kamitani in 2021.

On July 26, 2020 at Stardom Cinderella Summer In Tokyo, Kamitani and Utami Hayashishita won the vacant Goddesses of Stardom Championship after defeating Tokyo Cyber Squad (Jungle Kyona and Konami). At Yokohama Cinderella 2020 on October 3, Kamitani and Hayashishita had their first successful title defense when they defeated Donna Del Mondo (Himeka and Maika).

Kamitani and Hayashishita competed together in the 2020 Goddesses of Stardom Tag League as AphrOditE, which they would continue to use as their tag team name afterwards. At Osaka Dream Cinderella 2020 on December 20, Kamitani unsuccessfully challenged for the Future of Stardom Championship in a three-way match against Maika and Saya Iida. On December 26, AphrOditE lost the Goddesses of Stardom Championship to Oedo Tai (Bea Priestley and Konami), ending their reign at 153 days.

At All Star Dream Cinderella on March 3, Kamitani received her first match for the World of Stardom Championship, in which she lost to Utami Hayashishita. Kamitani won the 2021 Cinderella Tournament after defeating Maika in the finals. At Yokohama Dream Cinderella 2021 in Summer on July 4, Kamitani unsuccessfully challenged Tam Nakano for the Wonder of Stardom Championship.

Kamitani competed in the Blue Stars block of the 2021 5 Star Grand Prix which took place from July 31 to September 25. At the opening press conference on July 17, Kamitani accidentally revealed Takumi Iroha as the mystery opponent in her block, and then apologized for the mistake. She scored a total of 11 points, which was not enough to advance to the finals.

At the 10th Anniversary Grand Finale Osaka Dream Cinderella on October 9, Kamitani, AZM, and Momo Watanabe unsuccessfully challenged MaiHimePoi for the Artist of Stardom Championship. AphrOditE competed in the Red Goddess block of the 2021 Goddesses of Stardom Tag League, in which they scored seven points. At Tokyo Super Wars on November 27, Kamitani became the number one contender for the Wonder of Stardom Championship by defeating Himeka and Natsupoi in a three-way match.

At Dream Queendom on December 29, Kamitani won the Wonder of Stardom Championship by defeating Tam Nakano.

At Stardom Nagoya Supreme Fight on January 29, 2022, Kamitani successfully defended the Wonder of Stardom Championship against Mirai. At Stardom Cinderella Journey on February 23, she defended the title successfully again against Natsupoi. On the first night of the Stardom World Climax 2022 from March 26, she defended the title against Utami Hayashishita, and on the second night from March 27, again versus Tam Nakano.

At the 2022 Cinderella Tournament, she only scored a draw against Maika in the second rounds of April 10. At Stardom Golden Week Fight Tour on May 5, 2022, she defended the Wonder of Stardom Championship successfully against Maika. At Stardom Flashing Champions on May 28, 2022, she defended it again against Mirai.

At Stardom Fight in the Top on June 26, 2022, Kamitani teamed up with AZM and Utami Hayashishita and competed in one of Stardom's first steel cage matches, where they fell short to Stars (Mayu Iwatani, Koguma and Hazuki).

At Mid Summer Champions in Tokyo, the first event of the Stardom Mid Summer Champions series which took place on July 9, 2022, Kamitani defended the "white belt" once again against Starlight Kid. At Mid Summer Champions in Nagoya, the last event from July 24, she defended the title against Saki. At Stardom in Showcase vol.1 on July 23, 2022, Kamitani competed in a three-way casket match against Starlight Kid and Yuu who won the bout after unmasking from a "grim reaper costume".

At Stardom x Stardom: Nagoya Midsummer Encounter on August 21, 2022, she defeated Himeka to retain the Wonder of Stardom Championship. Kamitani was initially scheduled to defend against Kairi but the latter pulled out last minute due to COVID issues. At the 2022 5 Star Grand Prix which took place between July 30 and October 1, Kamitani competed in the "Blue Stars" block where she scored a total of 14 points. At Hiroshima Goddess Festival on November 3, 2022, Kamitani successfully defended the Wonder of Stardom Championship against Mina Shirakawa. At Stardom Gold Rush on November 19, 2022, Kamitani went into a time-limit draw against Kairi in a match disputed for the Wonder of Stardom Championship.

At Historic X-Over, an event co-promoted alongside NJPW on November 20, 2022, Kamitani teamed up with stablemates AZM and Lady C to defeat Donna Del Mondo (Himeka, Mai Sakurai and Thekla). At Stardom in Showcase vol.3 on November 26, 2022, Kamitani competed in a four-way comedic match won by Lady C and also involving Himeka and Momo Kohgo. At Stardom Dream Queendom 2022 on December 29, Kamitani defeated Haruka Umesaki to retain the Wonder of Stardom Championship.

At the Triangle Derby I, Kamitani teamed up with stablemates Utami Hayashishita and AZM, scoring a total of nine points in the A block which was not enough to qualify to the finals. In the finals night, she successfully defended the Wonder of Stardom Championship against Hazuki. At Stardom Supreme Fight 2023 on February 4, Kamitani scored another successful defense of the title, this time against Momo Watanabe. At Stardom in Showcase vol.4 on February 26, 2023, she teamed up with Utami Hayashishita and Miyu Amasaki and unsuccessfully competed in a three-way tag team match won by Stars (Mayu Iwatani, Hazuki and Koguma) and also involving Oedo Tai (Natsuko Tora, Starlight Kid and Momo Watanabe). At the 2023 Cinderella Tournament, Kamitani drew against Mayu Iwatani in the first rounds.

On April 23, 2023, at All Star Grand Queendom, Kamitani lost the Wonder of Stardom Championship to Mina Shirakawa, ending her reign at 480 days and a record setting 15 successful title defenses.

At Stardom Fukuoka Goddess Legend on May 5, 2023, she teamed up with Utami Hayashishita in a losing effort against Donna Del Mondo (Giulia and Maika). At Stardom Flashing Champions 2023 on May 28, se teamed up with Hayashishita and Hina to defeat YoungOED (Starlight Kid, Ruaka and Rina). At Stardom Sunshine 2023 on June 25, Kamitani teamed up with all the rest of Queen's Quest stablemates Utami Hayashishita, AZM, Miyu Amasaki, Lady C and Hina to defeat Oedo Tai's Natsuko Tora, Momo Watanabe, Saki Kashima, Starlight Kid, Ruaka and Rina in a Loser leaves unit steel cage match. At Stardom Mid Summer Champions 2023 on July 2, she teamed up with Hayashishita, AZM and Lady C to defeat Stars (Koguma, Mayu Iwatani, Momo Kohgo and Hanan).

Kamitani competed in the 2023 5 Star Grand Prix, but withdrew from the tournament after she suffered a legitimate dislocated elbow during her first match of the tournament against Tam Nakano on July 23. Kamitani made her return on November 28 alongside her AphrOditE teammate, Utami Hayashishita, who had also been out due to an injury.

At Nagoya Big Winter on December 2, AphrOditE won the vacant Goddesses of Stardom Championship by defeating Divine Kingdom (Maika and Megan Bayne). At Stardom Dream Queendom 2023 on December 29, Kamitani and Hayashishita successfully defended the tag titles against XL (Natsuko Tora and Momo Watanabe).

At Stardom New Year Stars 2024 on January 3, Kamitani teamed up with Hayashishita and AZM and drew against Suzu Suzuki, Megan Bayne and Mei Seira in the first rounds of the Triangle Derby II tournament. At Ittenyon Stardom Gate on January 4, 2024, Kamitani, Hayashishita and AZM defeated God's Eye (Mirai, Ami Sohrei and Saki Kashima). At Stardom Supreme Fight 2024 on February 4, Kamitani unsuccessfully challenged Maika for the World of Stardom Championship.

On March 30, 2024, Kamitani and Hayashishita lost the Goddesses of Stardom Championship to Crazy Star (Suzu Suzuki and Mei Seira). At Stardom American Dream 2024, she teamed up with AZM and Camron Branae in a losing effort against Black Desire (Momo Watanabe and Starlight Kid) and Stephanie Vaquer.

At Stardom All Star Grand Queendom 2024 on April 27, Kamitani won the High Speed Championship from Saki Kashima in a four-way match also involving Saya Iida and Fukigen Death. At Stardom Flashing Champions 2024 on May 18, Kamitani successfully defended the high speed title against Kashima.

At Stardom The Conversion on June 22, 2024, Kamitani teamed up with the rest of Queen's Quest's AZM, Lady C, Hina and Miyu Amasaki and fell short to Oedo Tai (Natsuko Tora, Thekla, Rina, Momo Watanabe and Ruaka) in a Ten-woman elimination tag team match. Per the stipulation, since Kamitani was the last wrestler eliminated, AZM, Hina, Lady C, and Amasaki all had to leave Queen's Quest. Thus, she remained the only member of the unit for a time.

On July 28, 2024, the second night of Sapporo World Rendezvous, Kamitani lost the High Speed Championship to Mei Seira.

==== H.A.T.E. (2024–present) ====
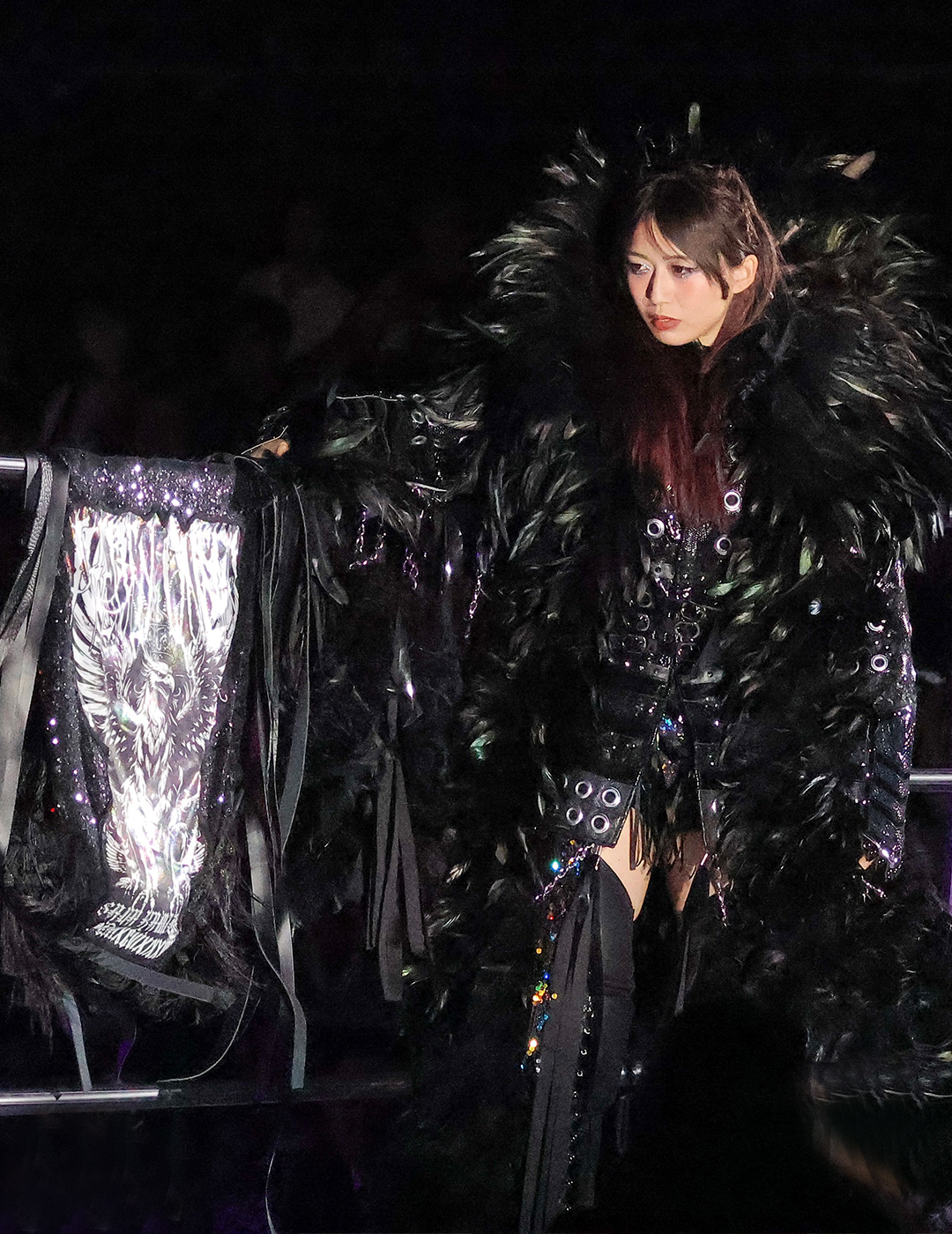
Kamitani in 2024 as a member of H.A.T.E.

On the same night at Sapporo World Rendezvous, during the World of Stardom Championship match between champion Maika and challenger Natsuko Tora, Kamitani turned heel when she interfered with the referee, giving Tora momentum to pick up the victory and the World of Stardom Championship. Kamitani declared Queen's Quest's dissolution, joining forces with Tora and the rest of the time's Oedo Tai members. Tora then declared the dissolution of Oedo Tai and the birth of the newly created unit of H.A.T.E.

During the 2024 5 Star Grand Prix, Kamitani qualified for the elimination stage at the top of Blue Stars B block and picked up wins over Starlight Kid and Hanan before losing to Maika in the final.

At Historic X-Over 2, held on November 17, 2024 at Osaka Prefectural Gymnasium, Kamitani teamed with Natsuko Tora and Bullet Club War Dogs (Drilla Moloney and Gabe Kidd) to defeat the team of wing☆gori (Hanan and Saya Iida), Hiroshi Tanahashi and Ryusuke Taguchi.

On December 29 at Stardom Dream Queendom, Kamitani defeated Tam Nakano to win the World of Stardom Championship for the first time.

On February 2, 2025 at Supreme Fight, Kamitani successfully defended the World of Stardom Championship for the first time by defeating Suzu Suzuki.

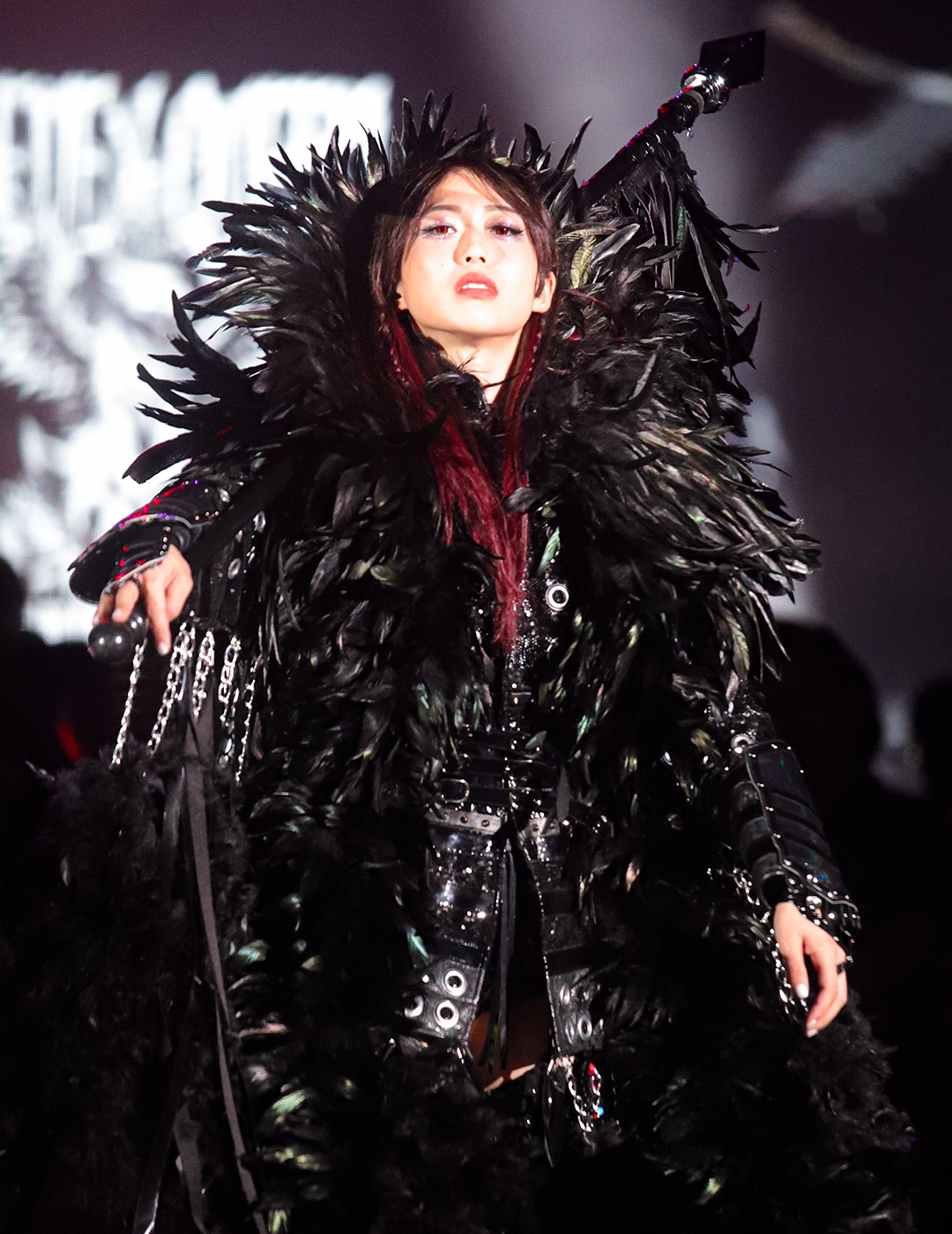
Kamitani makes her entrance wearing her Phenex Queen attire.

At Stardom Path of Thunder, Kamitani teamed with Tora in a losing effort to Nakano and Sayaka Kurara. Per the stipulation, Kamitani was forced to grant any request Nakano wanted, with the latter challenging Kamitani to a Loser Leaves Stardom match at Korakuen Hall on March 3. At the event, Kamitani defeated Nakano, but would offer one last opportunity at the World of Stardom Championship in a Career vs. Career match. At All Star Grand Queendom, Kamitani defeated Nakano, retaining her title and forcing Nakano to retire from professional wrestling.

As a result of defeating Nakano, Kurara challenged Kamitani by redeeming the wish granted to her by winning the 2025 Cinderella Tournament. On May 11, at Korakuen Hall, Kamitani defeated Kurara to retain the World of Stardom Championship. Then at Sapporo World Rendezvous, Kamitani retained the World of Stardom Championship by defeating Natsupoi.

Kamitani entered the 2025 5 Star Grand Prix, finishing top of the Red Stars A block after losing only to Bea Priestley in the league stage. She was eliminated from the tournament after a loss to AZM in the quarterfinals. Following the match, Priestley, using her league victory as leverage, challenged her to a title match at Stardom to the World. At the event, Kamitani defeated Priestley to retain the World of Stardom title. AZM then challenged Kamitani for both the World of Stardom championship and her own Strong Women's Championship at Korakuen Hall.

On August 27, in an interview with Daily Sports, Stardom's president Taro Okada credited Kamitani for playing a pivotal role as Stardom's attendance increased. On September 26, Kamitani defeated Hanan in an exhibition match on the morning variety show Love It! broadcast on TBS Television, as part of her final appearance as a season cast member. This was the first time a live women's professional wrestling match had been broadcast on Japanese terrestrial television in 23 years.

The following day at Korakuen Hall, Kamitani defeated AZM to win the Strong Women's Championship title and retain the World of Stardom Championship. Shortly after the match, H.A.T.E. stablemate and winner of the 2025 5 Star Grand Prix Momo Watanabe entered the ring to challenge Kamitani for both titles. At Crimson Nightmare on November 3, Kamitani defeated Watanabe to retain both titles.

Following her victory over Watanabe, Kamitani received dual title challenges from Syuri for the New Japan Pro Wrestling Strong Women's Championship and Saori Anou for the World of Stardom Championship. In December, Kamitani won the Tokyo Sports Pro Wrestling MVP (Most Valuable Player) award, becoming the first woman to receive the honor since its inception. In the build-up to the defense at Dream Queendom 2025, Anou attacked Kamitani at a press conference after exchanging heated words. Kamitani retaliated by attacking Anou during a Tokyo Sports interview in Anou's own car, after which Anou accused Tokyo Sports of serving as Kamitani's accomplice and refused further interviews with the outlet. At Dream Queendom 2025, Kamitani defeated Anou to retain her World of Stardom Championship. Following the match, Starlight Kid entered the ring and challenged for the World of Stardom Championship, declaring she would end the era of Kamitani.

On February 7, 2026 at Stardom Supreme Fight 2026, Kamitani successfully defended her title against Starlight Kid. On April 26 at Stardom All Star Grand Queendom 2026, Kamitani lost her title to Sayaka Kurara, ending her reign at 483 days. On May 26 at Stardom Nighter in Korakuen, Kamitani teamed with her stablemates to defea Saori Anou, Hazuki, Fuwa-chan, Maika and HANAKO. After the match, Kamitani was confronted by her former tag team partner and Queen's Quest stablemate, a returning Utami Hayashishita.

=== New Japan Pro Wrestling (2021–present) ===
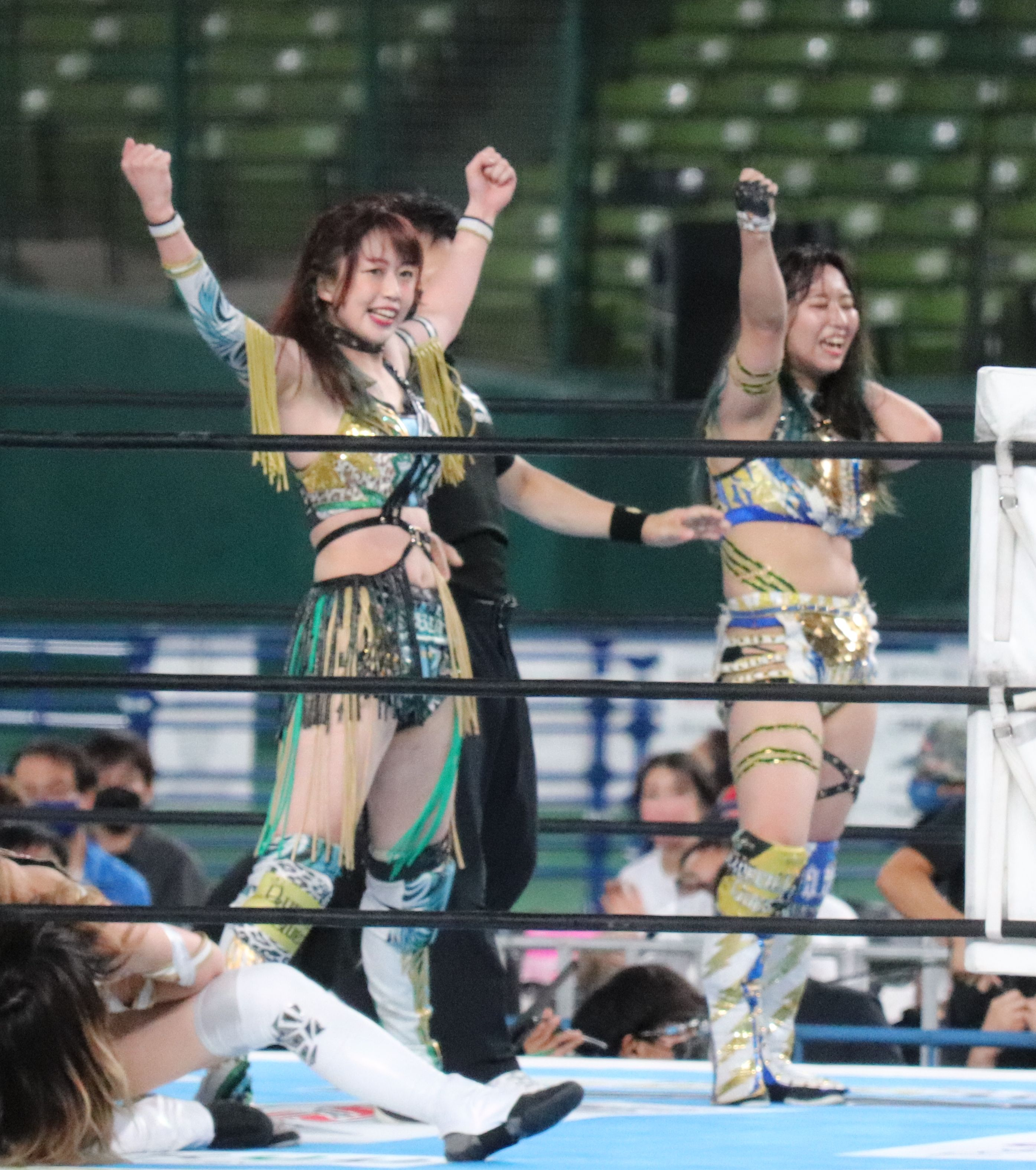
Kamitani (left) with Momo Watanabe (right) after their victory at Wrestle Grand Slam in MetLife Dome on September 4, 2021.

Kamitani has competed in exhibition matches organized by NJPW in partnership with Stardom. On January 5, 2021, at the second night of New Japan Pro-Wrestling (NJPW)'s Wrestle Kingdom 15, she made her first NJPW appearance where she, alongside AZM and Utami Hayashishita, defeated Himeka, Maika and Natsupoi in a dark match.

At Wrestle Grand Slam in MetLife Dome, Kamitani competed in both nights, first on September 4, 2021, where she teamed up with Momo Watanabe to defeat Lady C and Maika, and on September 5, where she teamed again with Watanabe, this time in a losing effort against Donna Del Mondo's Giulia and Syuri.

On January 5, 2022, the second night of Wrestle Kingdom 16, Kamitani teamed with Tam Nakano to defeat Mayu Iwatani and Starlight Kid.

At Wrestle Kingdom 20 on January 4, 2026, Kamitani faced Syuri in a Winner Takes All match for Syuri's IWGP Women's Championship and Kamitani's Strong Women's Championship. Kamitani would lose her title to Syuri, ending her reign after 99 days.

=== Pro Wrestling Wave (2024–present) ===
Kamitani competed in the 2024 edition of the Catch the Wave tournament, Pro Wrestling Wave's greatest annual competition, similar to Stardom's 5Star Grand Prix. She topped the A Block with four points after competing against Risa Sera, Yuko Sakurai and Nanami. She then won a tie-breaker match against Sera who also finished the block with four points. Kamitani defeated Itsuki Aoki in the semifinals and Kohaku in the finals to win the entire competition.

On November 4, 2024 at Prime Wave 2024, Kamitani defeated Yuki Miyazaki to win the Regina di Wave title for the first time. At Wave Nami 1 on January 1, 2025, Kamitani defeated Kohaku to mark her first successful defense of the Regina di Wave title. Throughout her championship reign, Kamitani went on to fend off title contenders such as Honoka, Shin Sakura Hirota, and Yumi Ohka. On August 10, during Wave's 18th anniversary show, Kamitani lost the title to Kohaku.

== In other media ==
Kamitani has appeared in other media outside of wrestling.

=== Music ===
Kamitani appears in the music video for Candy Foxx's "LAKILAKI WASABI", alongside Utami Hayashishita, Saki Kashima, Konami and Mina Shirakawa.

=== Television ===
On the February 23, 2025, Kamitani appeared on Chidori no Oni Renchan, a variety show broadcast on Fuji Television to participate in their 300m running challenge.

On April 7, 2025, Kamitani appeared on Shabekuri 007, broadcast on Nippon TV alongside Tam Nakano, Natsupoi, Mina Shirakawa and Natsuko Tora.

On May 9, 2025, Kamitani appeared as a guest on Love It! a morning variety show broadcast on TBS Television. Following this appearance, on June 30 Kamitani announced that she would become a regular member of the Love It! cast for the season, appearing on Friday mornings.

On May 25, 2025, Kamitani appeared on The Night of Hit Parade a music variety show broadcast on Nippon TV alongside Starlight Kid, AZM, Natsupoi, Saori Anou, Maika, Suzu Suzuki and Rina to perform the Creepy Nuts song "Bling-Bang-Bang-Born".

== Championships and accomplishments ==
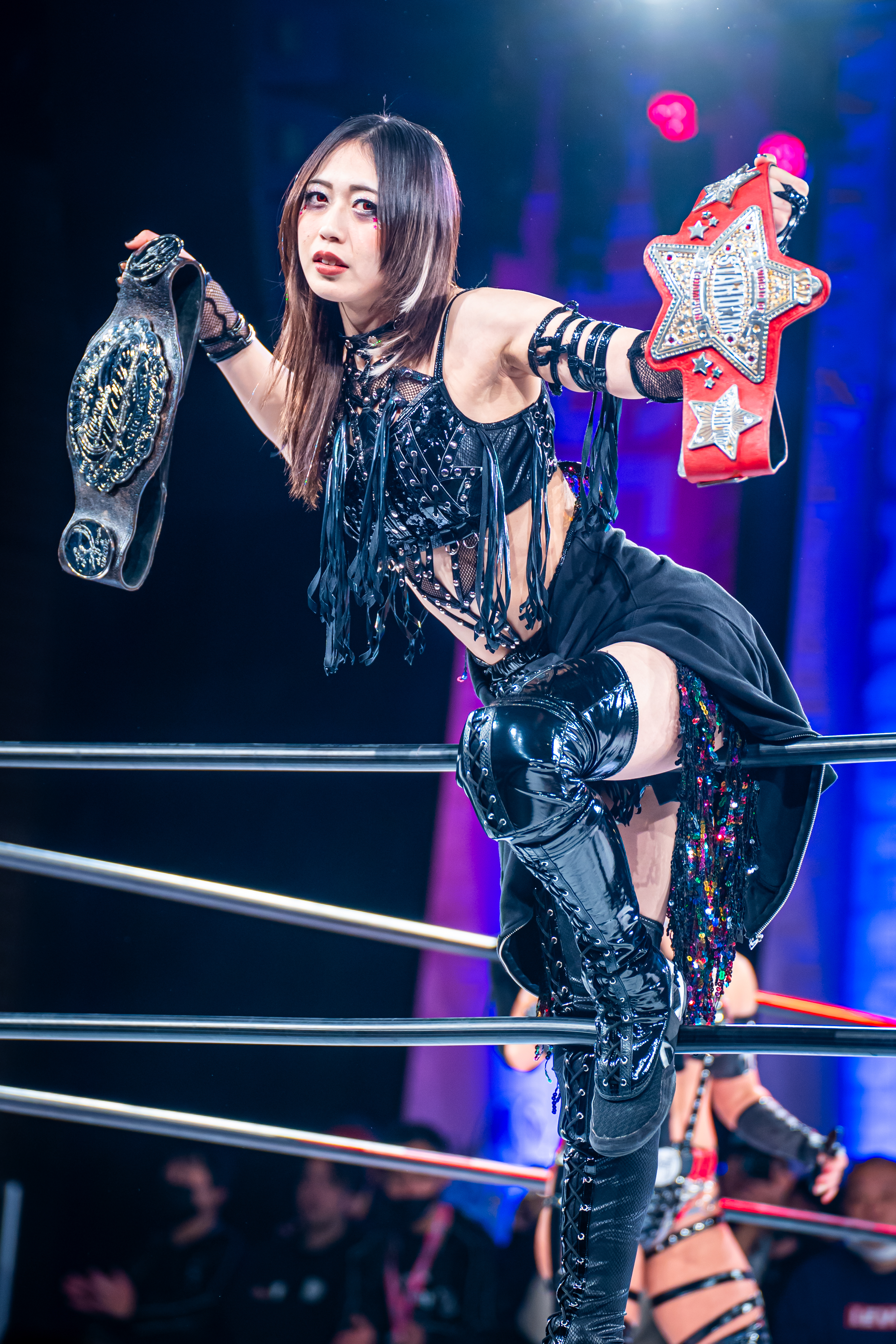
Kamitani is a one-time Regina di Wave Champion and a one-time World of Stardom Champion

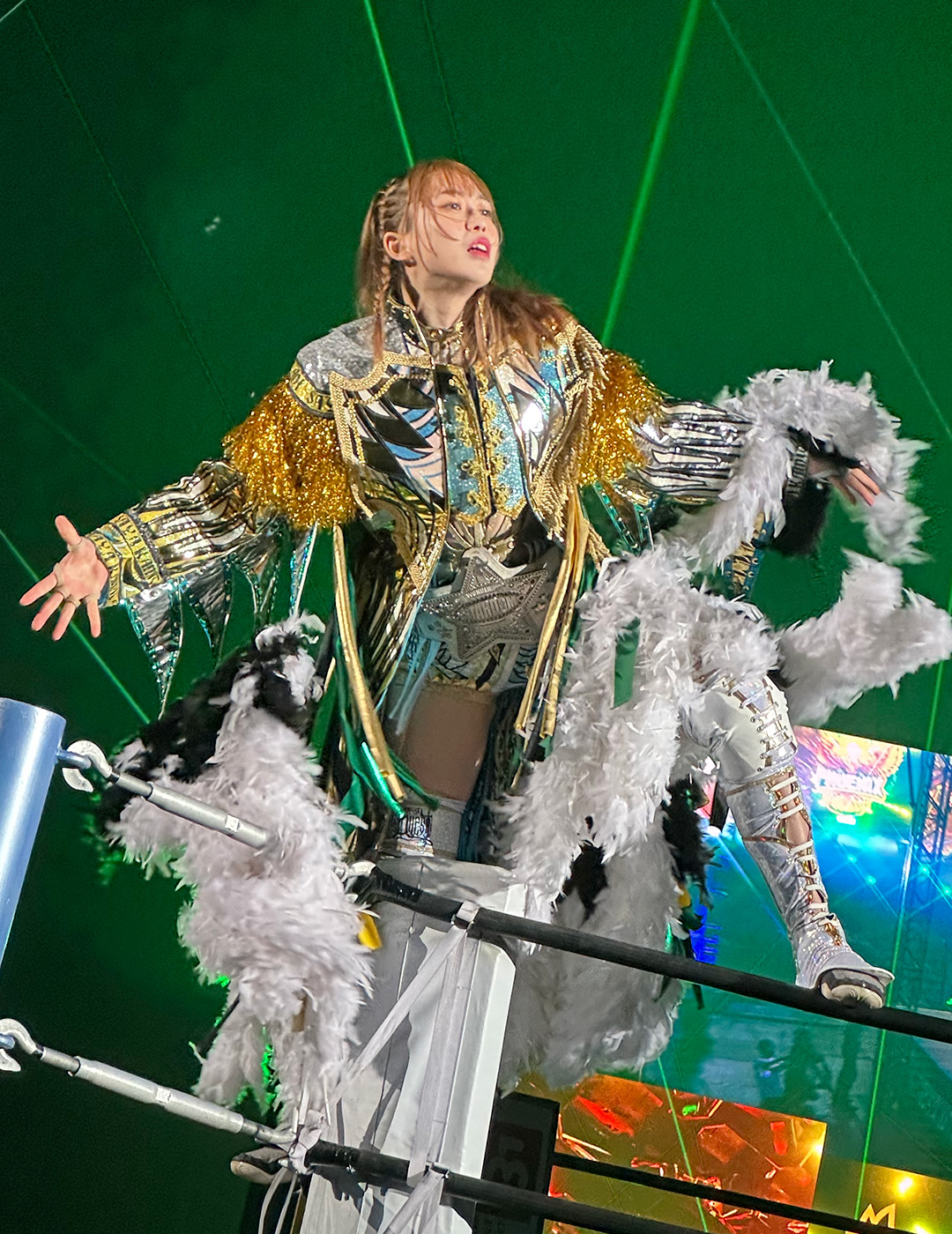
....ia one-time Wonder of Stardom Champion

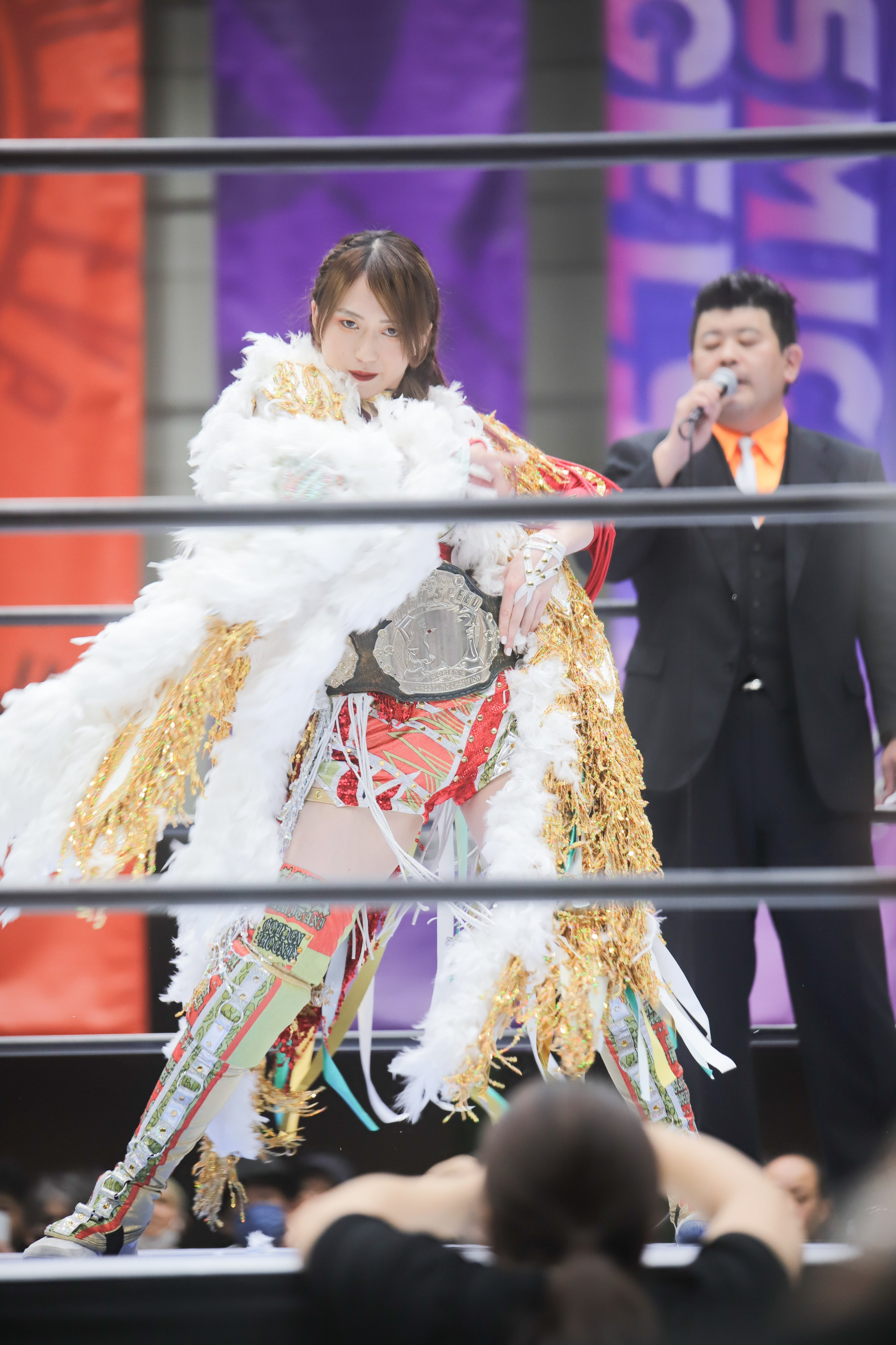
....and a one-time High Speed Champion

- ESPN
  - Ranked No. 22 of the 30 best Pro Wrestlers Under 30 in 2023
- Pro Wrestling Illustrated
  - Ranked No. 3 of the top 250 female wrestlers in the PWI Female 250 in 2025
  - Ranked No. 20 of the top 50 tag teams in the PWI Tag Team 50 in 2020 with AZM, Momo Watanabe and Utami Hayashishita
- New Japan Pro-Wrestling
  - Strong Women's Championship (1 time)
- Pro Wrestling Wave
  - Regina di Wave Championship (1 time)
  - Catch the Wave (2024)
- World Wonder Ring Stardom
  - Goddesses of Stardom Championship (2 times) – with Utami Hayashishita
  - High Speed Championship (1 time)
  - Wonder of Stardom Championship (1 time)
  - World of Stardom Championship (1 time)
  - Cinderella Tournament (2021)
  - Stardom Rookie of the Year (2019)
  - 5★Star GP Award (3 times)
    - 5★Star GP Blue Stars Best Match Award (2022) vs. Suzu Suzuki on September 11
    - 5★Star GP Red Stars Best Match Award (2025) vs. Mei Seira on August 16 in Red Stars A
    - 5★Star GP Blue Stars Best Match Award (2026) vs. Momo Watanabe on August 3 in Blue Stars B
  - Stardom Year-End Award (9 times)
    - Best Tag Team Award (2020) with Utami Hayashishita
    - Best Technique Award (2021)
    - Outstanding Performance Award (2022)
    - Best Unit Award (2023) - as part of Queen's Quest
    - Special Merit Award (2024) shared with Mina Shirakawa
    - MVP Award (2025)
    - Best Match Award (2025) vs. Tam Nakano at All Star Grand Queendom 2025
    - Shining Award (2025)
    - Best Unit Award (2025) - as part of H.A.T.E.
- Tokyo Sports
  - MVP Award (2025) (first woman to win)
  - Joshi Puroresu Grand Prize (2025)
- Wrestling Observer Newsletter
  - Women's Wrestling MVP (2025)
  - Koichi Yoshizawa Award (Japan MVP) (2025)

== Luchas de Apuestas record ==
Winner (wager)	Loser (wager)	Location	Event	Date	Notes
Saya Kamitani (Contract)	Tam Nakano (Contract)	Tokyo, Japan	Stardom Nighter at Korakuen Hall	March 3, 2025	
Saya Kamitani (Career)	Tam Nakano (Career)	Yokohama, Japan	Stardom All Star Grand Queendom 2025	April 27, 2025	
