= Giulia (wrestler) =

Japanese professional wrestler (born 1994)

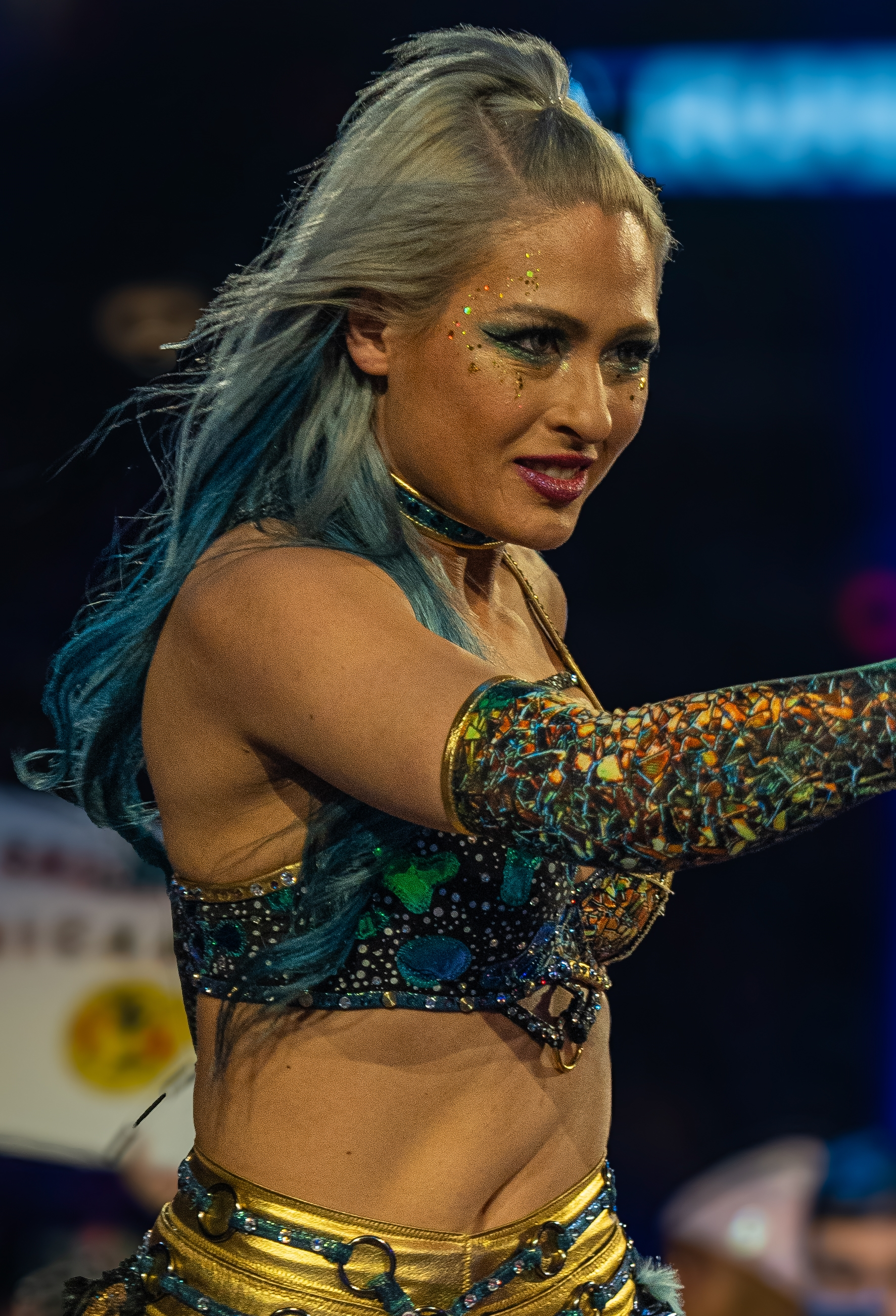
- Giulia in 2025

Personal information
- Born: Eimi Gloria Matsudo; 21 February 1994 (age 32) London, England

Professional wrestling career
- Ring name: Giulia
- Billed height: 163 cm (5 ft 4 in)
- Billed weight: 55 kg (121 lb)
- Billed from: Tokyo, Japan
- Trained by: Hideki Suzuki; Mio Shirai; Tsukasa Fujimoto; Milano Collection A. T.
- Debut: 29 October 2017

Eimi Gloria Matsudo (松戸グロリア英美, Matsudo Guroria Eimi; born February 21, 1994), better known by her ring name Giulia (ジュリア, Juria), is a Japanese professional wrestler. She is signed to WWE, where she performs on the SmackDown brand.

Matsudo began her professional wrestling with Ice Ribbon in 2017, where she became a one-time International Ribbon Tag Team Champion. Matsudo signed with World Wonder Ring Stardom in 2019 and won the World of Stardom Championship, Wonder of Stardom Championship and Goddesses of Stardom Champion once each, the Artist of Stardom Championship twice, and the 2020 Cinderella Tournament and 2022 5 Star Grand Prix. She also performed for New Japan Pro-Wrestling (NJPW), winning the Strong Women's Championship once, and Dream Star Fighting Marigold.

In 2024, Matsudo joined WWE and has since gone on to become a one-time NXT Women's Champion and a record-tying two-time Women's United States Champion.

== Early life ==
Eimi Gloria Matsudo was born in London, England on February 21, 1994, to a Japanese mother and Italian father. When she was one year old, her family moved to Japan, where she was raised in Chiba Prefecture. She was bullied during her school days due to being biracial, eventually prompting her parents to put her in a private high school. She later worked in her parents' Italian restaurant.

== Professional wrestling career ==
=== Ice Ribbon (2017–2019) ===
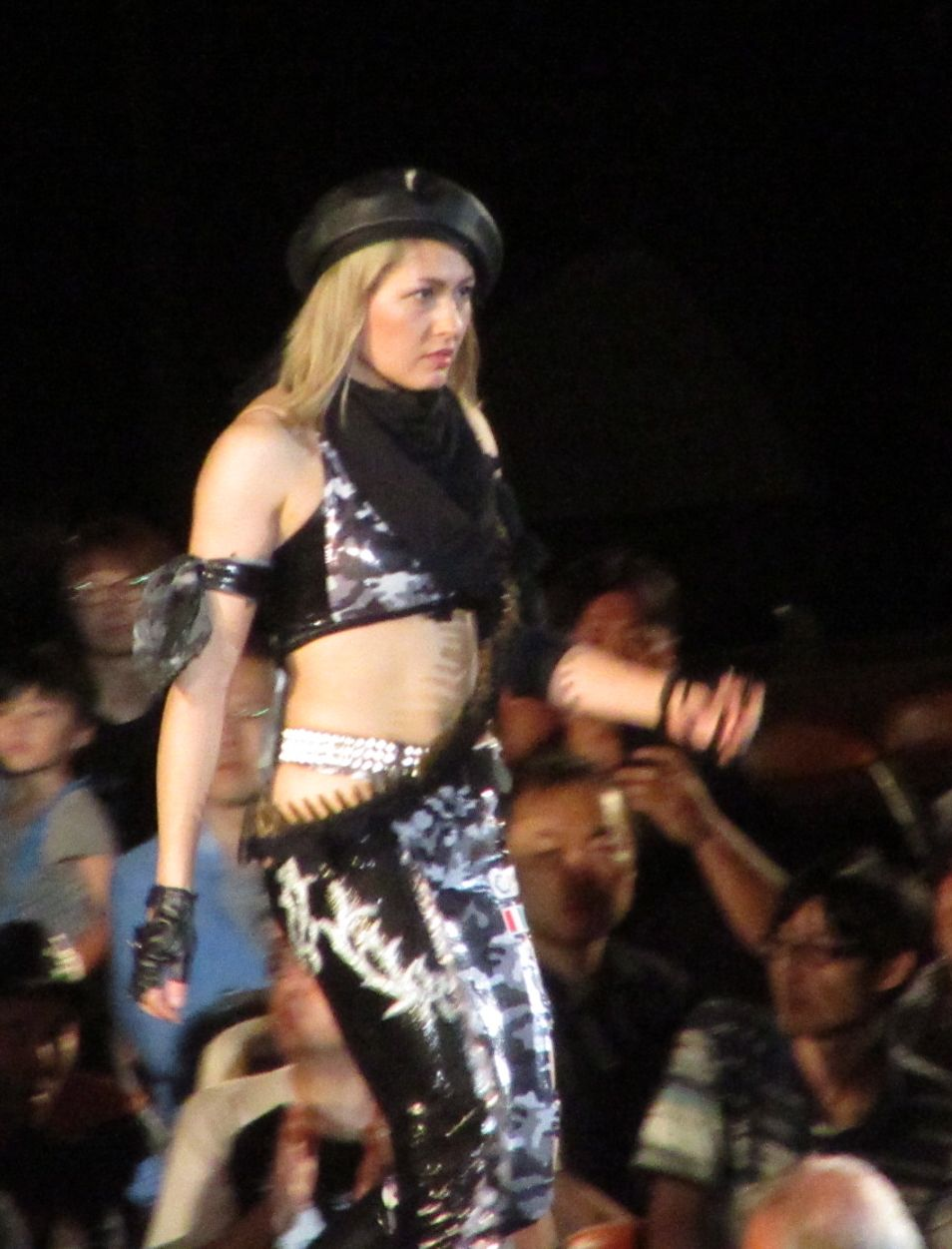
Giulia in 2018

In 2017, Matsudo began training as a professional wrestler under Hideki Suzuki, Mio Shirai, Tsukasa Fujimoto, and Milano Collection A. T.. She debuted under the ring name Giulia at New Ice Ribbon #845 on 29 October 2017, teaming with Takako Inoue in a tag team loss to Nao Date and Satsuki Totoro. In November, she entered the Young Ice Tournament, where she was eliminated by Totoro in the first round. In April 2018, she wrestled Ice Ribbon's ace, Tsukasa Fujimoto, for the first time, losing in 39 seconds. On 24 September, Giulia got her first singles victory when she defeated Asahi. In the latter part of the year, Giulia began a feud with Tequila Saya, which eventually bought in male wrestlers Shinya Aoki and Hideki Suzuki, who acted as mentors for the female wrestlers and taught them new moves throughout their feud. After a match on 31 December, where Saya and Suzuki were defeated by Giulia and Aoki, her and Saya reconciled and formed a tag team known as Burning Raw. At the end of the year, she was presented with Ice Ribbon's New Face Award, the equivalent of winning Rookie of the Year.

On 27 January 2019, Burning Raw unsuccessfully challenged Kyuri and Maika Ozaki for the International Ribbon Tag Team Championship. After 17 February, Giulia announced she would be taking a month off from wrestling due to nerve damage in her hip. After returning, she began a feud with Maya Yukihi, which culminated in Giulia unsuccessfully challenging for the ICE Cross Infinity Championship on 25 May. In July, Burning Raw defeated Yukihi and Risa Sera to win the International Ribbon Tag Team Championship; Giulia's first championship win of her career. After 3 months as champions, Burning Raw lost the titles back to Yukihi and Sera on 23 September, ending their reigns at 70 days. On 13 October, Giulia announced she would be leaving Ice Ribbon.

=== Independent circuit (2017–2024) ===
On 1 October 2017, Giulia was invited by Toshiaki Kawada to compete on one of his Holy War shows, where she was defeated by veteran Command Bolshoi. Weeks later, Giulia was defeated by Aja Kong in a singles match for the Oz Academy promotion. Giulia made several appearances for Big Japan Pro Wrestling in events where joshi puroresu was also promoted. The first one was a house show on 9 June 2018, where Giulia lost to Tequila Saya. At 2018 Pro Wrestling Zero1's Tenka-Ichi Junior Tournament on 18 November, she picked up a victory against Mochi Miyagi. At AWG Act In Osaka, an event promoted by Actwres girl'Z on 21 July 2019, Giulia unsuccessfully challenged Saori Anou for the AgZ Championship.

=== World Wonder Ring Stardom (2019–2024) ===
On 14 October 2019, Giulia announced that she had signed with World Wonder Ring Stardom. On 8 December, she made her in-ring debut on Stardom where she defeated Hazuki.

During January 2020, Giulia formed a new unit named Donna Del Mondo, recruiting Maika and Syuri to the stable in the process. On 8 February, Donna del Mondo defeated Queen's Quest (AZM, Momo Watanabe, and Utami Hayashishita) to win the Artist of Stardom Championship. On 24 March, Giulia defeated Jungle Kyona, Watanabe, fellow Donna del Mondo's stablemate Syuri, and finally Natsuko Tora to be crowned the 2020 Cinderella Tournament winner. In July, a feud began between Giulia and Tam Nakano, initially for the Wonder of Stardom Championship, that would continue intermittently for several years. On 26 July at Cinderella Summer in Tokyo, Giulia defeated Nakano in the finals of a four-woman tournament to win the vacant Wonder of Stardom Championship; winning her first singles title. On 3 October, Giulia had her first successful title defense, where she defeated Nakano in a rematch. In October and November, Giulia and Maika competed in the Red Goddesses' Block of the 2020 Goddesses of Stardom Tag League, under the team name Crazy Bloom. They reached the finals of the tournament, in which they lost to MOMOAZ. On 14 November, Donna Del Mondo lost the Artist of Stardom Championship to Oedo Tai (Bea Priestley, Saki Kashima and Tora), ending their reigns at 280 days. At Sendai Cinderella 2020 on 15 November, Giulia successfully defended the Wonder of Stardom Championship against Konami. On 20 December, Giulia defended the Wonder of Stardom Championship in a title vs. title match against fellow Donna Del Mondo's member Syuri, who also defended the SWA World Championship. The match ended in a time-limit draw, with both titleholders retaining their titles in the process.

On 3 March 2021, at All Star Dream Cinderella, Giulia was defeated by Nakano in a hair vs. hair match for the Wonder of Stardom Championship, ending her reign at 220 days. During post-match, she had her head partially shaved in the ring, with the rest cut off backstage. At Yokohama Dream Cinderella 2021 on 4 April, Giulia teamed up with Syuri to win the Goddesses of Stardom Championship from fellow Donna Del Mondo's members, Maika and Himeka, after an interstable clash. Giulia and Syuri would later name their tag team Alto Livello Kabaliwan (English: "High Level Madness"), often shortened to ALK. Giulia made it to the second round of the 2021 Cinderella Tournament on 14 May, where she lost to Maika. At Yokohama Dream Cinderella 2021 in Summer on 4 July, ALK successfully defended their Goddesses of Stardom Championship against Stars (Mayu Iwatani and Koguma). Giulia took part in the 2021 5 Star Grand Prix, competing in the Red Stars' Block, but pulled out of the tournament after three matches due to dealing with several injuries. She made her in-ring return on 29 December, at Dream Queendom, where she successfully picked up a victory against Konami, who was departing from Stardom.

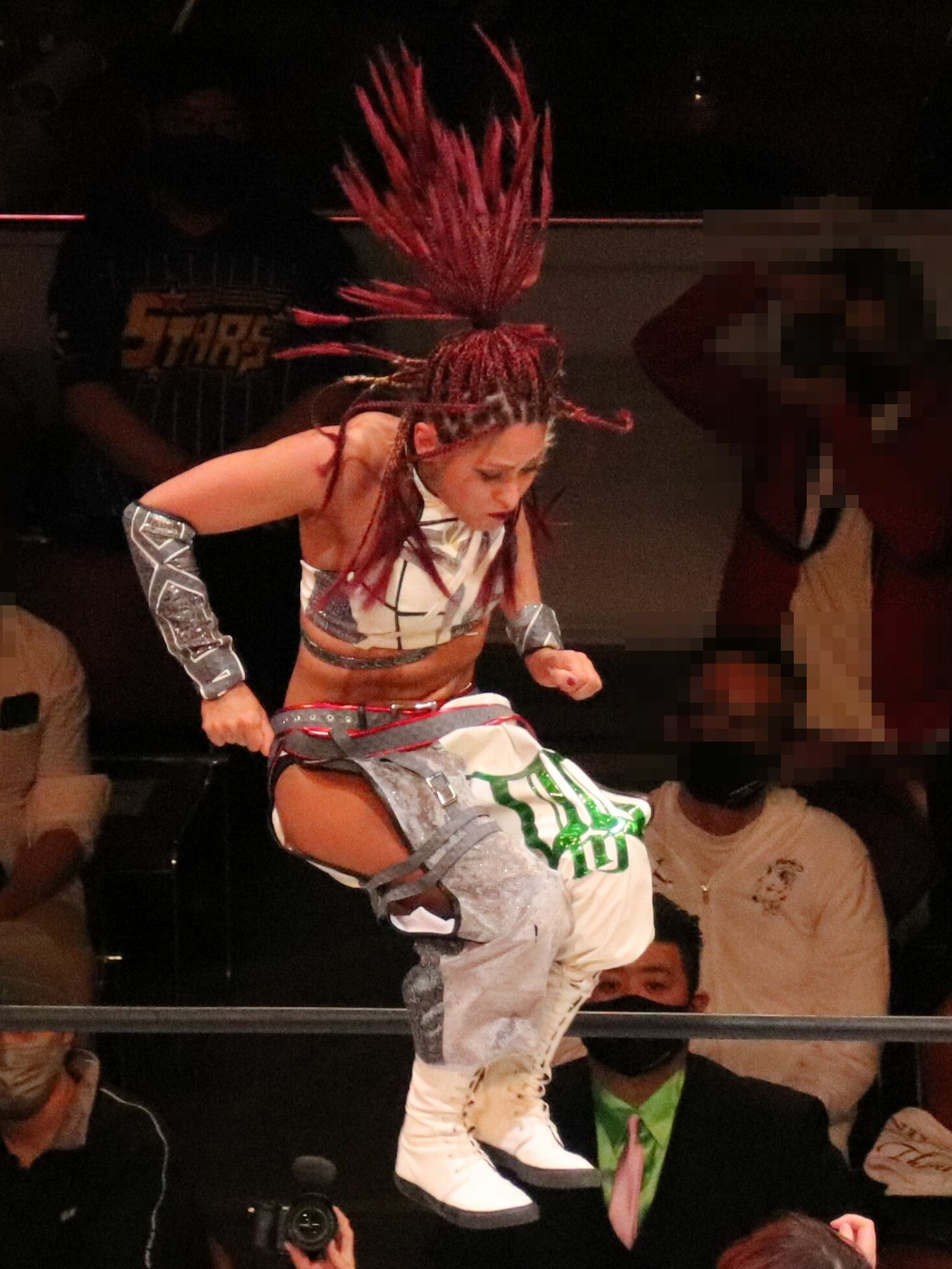
Giulia in 2022

On 3 January 2022, Giulia revealed Thekla from Ice Ribbon and Mirai from Tokyo Joshi Pro Wrestling as the two masked superstars who kept attacking various other wrestlers at the end of 2021. All three of them teamed up to defeat Cosmic Angels (Nakano, Mai Sakurai and Unagi Sayaka) in a six-woman tag team match. At Nagoya Golden Fight on 29 January, Giulia battled Iwatani into a time-limit draw in a No. 1 Contender match for the World of Stardom Championship, which awarded both of them an opportunity to challenge for the championship at World Climax 2022. On the first night of the event on March 26, Giulia unsuccessfully challenged Syuri for the World of Stardom Championship. After their match, Syuri announced she will leave Donna Del Mondo to walk on her path and form another stable, later revealed to be God's Eye. On the second night from March 27, Giulia teamed up with Maika, Himeka and Thekla to take out Prominence's Risa Sera, Suzu Suzuki, Akane Fujita and Mochi Miyagi, with whom all the Donna Del Mondo members had been in a feud. However, Suzuki stated that she was not finished with Giulia, despite her unit's loss, which meant that the feud was still standing. At the 2022 Cinderella Tournament, Giulia reached the second rounds on 10 April, where she lost to Koguma. At Flashing Champions on 28 May, Giulia teamed up with Sakurai to unsuccessfully face FWC for the Goddesses of Stardom Championship. At Fight in the Top on 26 June, Giulia, Maika, and Sakurai unsuccessfully challenged Oedo Tai (Saki Kashima, Watanabe and Starlight Kid), and God's Eye (Syuri, Mirai and Ami Sourei) in a three-way match for the Artist of Stardom Championship. Giulia was announced compete in the 2022 5 Star Grand Prix on 30 July. She won the whole competition on the last day of the tournament on October 1 by defeating Nakano in the finals. On 29 December at Dream Queendom 2, Giulia defeated Syuri to win the World of Stardom Championship for the first time.

On 4 February 2023, at Stardom Supreme Fight, Giulia had her first successful title defense of the World of Stardom Championship by defeating Suzuki. On 4 March, Giulia's second title defense, against Maya Yukihi, ended in a double countout. It was later reported that the reason for the match ending in a double countout was due to real-life heat between the two. On 23 April, at All Star Grand Queendom, Giulia lost the title to Nakano, ending her reign at 115 days. On 27 May, at Flashing Champions, Giulia, Sakurai and Thekla, together known as the Baribari Bombers, defeating Artist of Stardom Champions REStart (Kairi, Natsupoi and Saori Anou) to win the titles.

At New Years Stars 2024 on 3 January, Baribari Bombers participated in the 2024 Triangle Derby. After reaching the finals and deciding to defend the Artist of Stardom Championship, they lost the match and titles to Abarenbo GE, ending their reigns at 221 days.

On February 27, 2024, Tokyo Sports reported that Giulia would be leaving Stardom at the conclusion of her contract. Giulia had her last match in Stardom on April 12, teaming with Syuri against Iwatani and Hanan.

=== New Japan Pro-Wrestling (2020–2024) ===
Giulia has taken part in exhibition matches organized by New Japan Pro-Wrestling, in relationship with World Wonder Ring Stardom, to promote female wrestlers. On 4 January 2020, in her first match, Giulia teamed up with Hana Kimura in a losing effort to Mayu Iwatani and Arisa Hoshiki on the first night of Wrestle Kingdom 14. On 5 January, the second night of Wrestle Kingdom 15, Giulia teamed up with fellow Donna Del Mondo's stable member Syuri to defeat Iwatani and Tam Nakano. On the second night of the Wrestle Grand Slam in MetLife Dome on September 4, Giulia once again teamed up with Syuri to defeat Momo Watanabe and Saya Kamitani. On 20 November 2022, at Historic X-Over, Giulia teamed up with Zack Sabre Jr. and defeated Syuri and Tom Lawlor in a mixed tag team match.

On 5 July 2023, at NJPW Independence Day, Giulia defeated Willow Nightingale to become NJPW STRONG Women's Champion. On 20 August, at Multiverse United 2, Giulia wrestled in the U.S. for the first time in her career, where she successfully defended the Strong Women's Championship against Deonna Purrazzo, Gisele Shaw, and Momo Kohgo. Giulia lost the Strong Women's Championship to Stephanie Vaquer on Night 2 of Stardom Cinderella Tournament 2024, ending her reign at 249 days.

=== Dream Star Fighting Marigold (2024) ===
On 15 April 2024, former Stardom executive Rossy Ogawa held a press conference to announce his new promotion Dream Star Fighting Marigold, with Giulia being one of the initial members of the roster. On 20 May, she participated in the main event of Marigold's debut production, Marigold Fields Forever, tag-teaming with Utami Hayashishita in a losing effort against Sareee and Bozilla. At the end of the event, Giulia and Sareee were scheduled for a singles match at Marigold Summer Destiny, on 13 July 2024. However, the next day, it was announced by Marigold that Giulia had suffered a wrist fracture, with her near-term matches cancelled, and putting her match against Sareee for the inaugural Marigold World Championship in doubt. In the end, the bout took place, with Giulia coming unsuccessful. Giulia then announced that her final match for Marigold before moving to WWE would be on 19 August, against Mai Sakurai at Marigold Summer Gold Shine 2024. At the event, Giulia defeated Sakurai.

=== WWE ===
==== NXT (2024–2025) ====
After being spotted taking photos with fans at the WWE World at WrestleMania convention, and appearing at NXT Stand & Deliver in the crowd, it was later reported that Giulia was on the verge of signing with WWE. She made her official debut at NXT No Mercy, confronting NXT Women's Champion Roxanne Perez, establishing herself as a face in the process. At Week 1 of NXT's CW premier on 1 October, Giulia failed to win the title from Perez after interference from the returning Cora Jade. At NXT Deadline on 7 December, Giulia won the women's Iron Survivor Challenge to earn an NXT Women's Championship match at NXT: New Year's Evil, where she defeated Perez to win the title. She also participated in her first Royal Rumble match. At NXT Roadblock on 11 March, Giulia lost the title to NXT Women's North American Champion Stephanie Vaquer in a Winner Takes All match, ending her reign at 63 days. It was later reported that Giulia had suffered an injury prior to the match and would be taking time off to heal.

Giulia returned from injury on the April 8 episode of NXT, fending off Jordynne Grace and Jaida Parker from Vaquer, only to attack her afterwards, turning heel in the process. She would then challenge Vaquer for the NXT Women's Championship at NXT Stand and Deliver in a fatal four-way match also involving Grace and Parker, which Giulia lost after Vaquer pinned Parker. On the May 6 episode of NXT, Giulia faced Grace in a #1 contender's match for the NXT Women's Championship, which she lost in what would be her final NXT appearance.

==== SmackDown (2025–present) ====
On April 21, Giulia made her first main roster appearance on the Raw after WrestleMania 41 alongside Roxanne Perez, interfering a match between Women's World Champion Iyo Sky and NXT Women's Champion Stephanie Vaquer. On the May 12 episode of Raw, Giulia and Roxanne lost to Sky and Rhea Ripley in a tag team match. On the May 16 episode of SmackDown, Giulia was announced as the newest member of the SmackDown brand. The following week, Giulia made her SmackDown debut, defeating Charlotte Flair and Women's United States Champion Zelina Vega in a triple threat match to qualify for the Money in the Bank ladder match at the namesake event by pinning Vega, but the match was won by Naomi. On the June 27 episode of SmackDown, Giulia defeated Vega to win the Women's United States Championship. On the July 25 episode of SmackDown, Giulia aligned herself with a returning Kiana James, with the latter serving as her official representative. The following week, Giulia made her first title defense, retaining the title in a rematch against Vega. On the November 7 episode of SmackDown, Giulia lost the title to Chelsea Green, ending her reign at a record 133 days, but regained the title on the January 2, 2026 episode of SmackDown.

On the February 6 episode of SmackDown, Giulia and James faced WWE Women's Tag Team Champions Rhiyo (Rhea Ripley and Iyo Sky) for the titles but lost the match. Gulia lost the Women's United States Championship to Tiffany Stratton on the April 24 episode of SmackDown, ending her second reign at 112 days. Her alliance with James ended when James blamed her for her failure to advance to the semifinals of the Queen of the Ring tournament on the June 5 episode of SmackDown, prompting Giulia to retaliate against her former ally.

== Professional wrestling style and persona ==
Giulia was nicknamed "Beautiful Madness" during her time in Stardom and the nickname was carried into WWE. One of her signature wrestling maneuvers is a variation of the scissored armbar crossface, which she calls simply Bianca. She also uses a knee lift as her finisher, which she calls Arrivederci, the other finisher is a northern lights bomb, a move popularized by fellow compatriot Akira Hokuto.

== Other media ==
Matsudo released an autobiography titled My Dream on August 23, 2024.

== Championships and accomplishments ==
- ESPN
  - Ranked No. 11 of the 30 best Pro Wrestlers Under 30 in 2023
- Ice Ribbon
  - International Ribbon Tag Team Championship (1 time) – with Tequila Saya
  - Ice Ribbon Year-End Awards
    - Rookie Award (2018) tied with Tequila Saya
- New Japan Pro-Wrestling
  - Strong Women's Championship (1 time)
- Pro Wrestling Illustrated
  - Ranked No. 16 of the top 150 female singles wrestlers in the PWI Women's 150 in 2021
  - Ranked No. 5 of the top 50 Tag Teams in the PWI Tag Team 50 in 2021 – with Syuri
  - Ranked No. 2 of the top 250 women's wrestlers in the PWI Women's 250 in 2023
- Tokyo Sports
  - Women's Wrestling Grand Prize (2020)
- Weekly Pro-Wrestling
  - Women's Professional Wrestling Grand Prix (2020)
- World Wonder Ring Stardom
  - Artist of Stardom Championship (2 times) – with Maika and Syuri (1), Mai Sakurai and Thekla (1)
  - Goddesses of Stardom Championship (1 time) – with Syuri
  - Wonder of Stardom Championship (1 time)
  - World of Stardom Championship (1 time)
  - Cinderella Tournament (2020)
  - 5★Star GP (2022)
  - 5★Star GP Awards
    - Red Stars Best Match Award
      - (2020) vs. Tam Nakano on 13 September
      - (2021) vs. Mayu Iwatani on 1 August
  - Stardom Year-End Awards (6 times)
    - Best Match Award
      - (2021) vs. Tam Nakano on 3 March
      - (2022) vs. Syuri on 29 December
      - (2023) vs. Megan Bayne on 29 December
    - Best Unit Award (2020) as part of Donna Del Mondo
    - MVP Award (2020)
    - Shining Award (2020)
- WWE
  - WWE Women's United States Championship (2 times)
  - NXT Women's Championship (1 time)
  - Women's Iron Survivor Challenge (2024)

== Luchas de Apuestas record ==
Winner (wager)	Loser (wager)	Location	Event	Date	Notes
Tam Nakano (hair)	Giulia (hair)	Tokyo, Japan	All Star Dream Cinderella	3 March 2021	
