= Starlight Kid =

Japanese professional wrestler

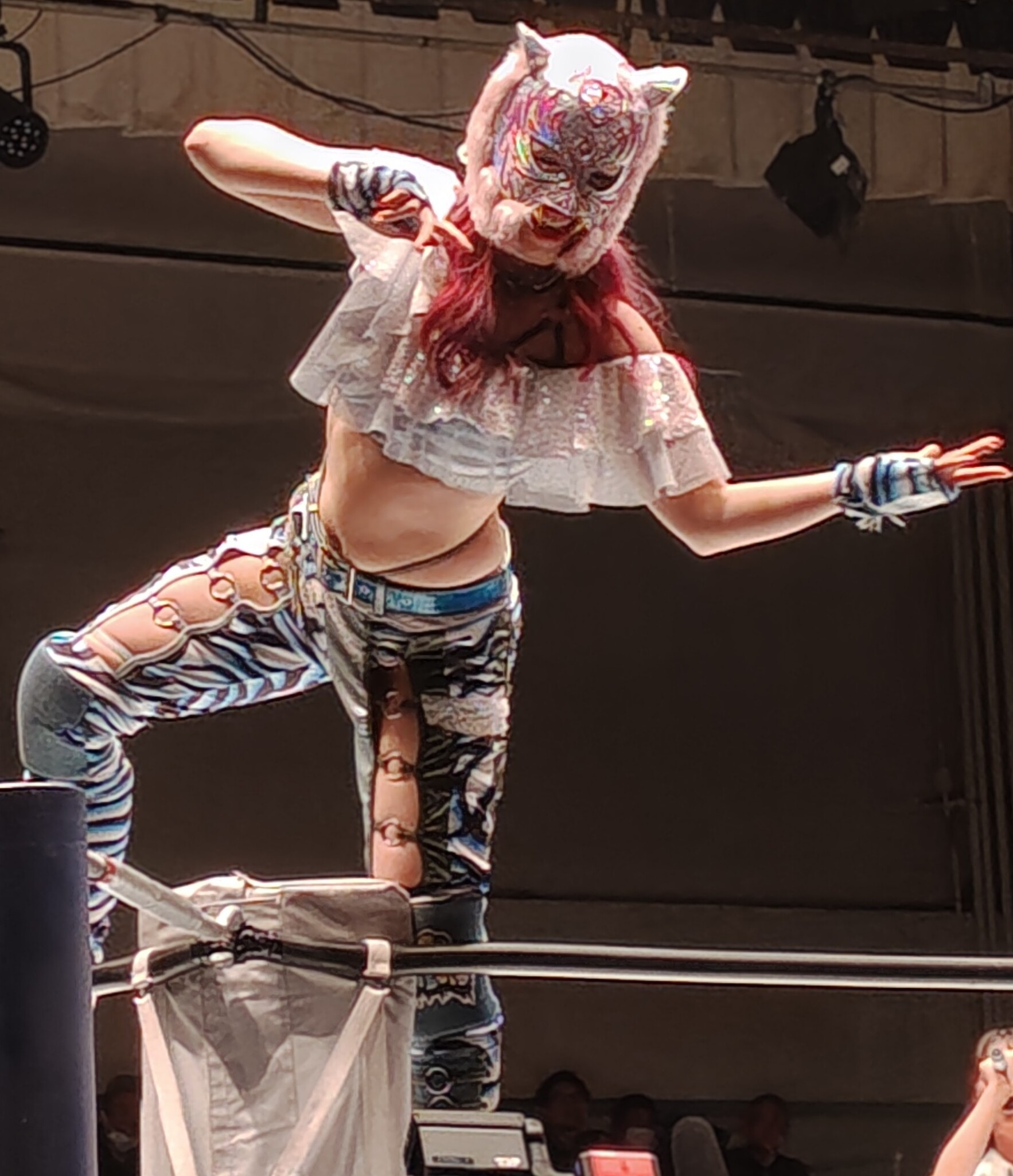
- Starlight Kid in 2026

Personal information
- Born: August 18, 2001 (age 25) Nagasaki Prefecture, Japan

Professional wrestling career
- Ring name(s): El Desperado; Starlight Kid
- Billed height: 1.50 m (4 ft 11 in)
- Billed weight: 50 kg (110 lb)
- Trained by: Fuka
- Debut: October 11, 2015

Starlight Kid (スターライト・キッド, Sutāraito Kiddo) (born August 18, 2001) is a Japanese professional wrestler. She is signed to World Wonder Ring Stardom where she is the leader of Neo Genesis and a former Wonder of Stardom Champion.

She is also a former one-time High Speed Champion, two-time Artist of Stardom Champion, one-time and inaugural Future of Stardom Champion, one-time Goddesses of Stardom Champion and one-time and inaugural New Blood Tag Team Champion. She is the first wrestler to wear her mask full-time in Stardom as part of her luchadora persona. Greatly influenced by Lucha libre, Starlight Kid has followed Mexican tradition for masked wrestlers, so her real name is not a matter of public record.

== Professional wrestling career ==
=== World Wonder Ring Stardom (2015–present) ===
==== Early career (2015–2018) ====
Starlight Kid made her professional wrestling debut on October 11, 2015 in a three-way match in which she and Momo Watanabe lost to Kaori Yoneyama. On November 8, she competed in her first major Stardom tournament, teaming up with Hiromi Mimura to compete in the 2015 Goddesses of Stardom Tag League. The team lost in the first round to Watanabe & Datura. After that, she would team up with Miura very often. Kid spent most of her matches losing to other, more experienced wrestlers, which would help put over other wrestlers while at the same time giving Starlight Kid some in-ring, televised, experience.

Starting in June 2016, Kid took a year long break from wrestling. She made her return on June 11, 2017. In March 2018, she would participate in the tournament for the inaugural Future of Stardom Championship where she defeated Hanan in the first round and then she would defeat Shiki Shibusawa in the tournament final to become the inaugural Future of Stardom Champion, which was newly established at the Korakuen Hall Tournament, and became the first champion.

==== Stars (2018–2021) ====
As a result of the 2018 Stardom Draft on April 15, 2018, Starlight Kid formed a stable with Mayu Iwatani, Saki Kashima, Shiki Shibusawa, Natsumi, and Tam Nakano after she was revealed as their fifth pick with stable being later named STARS. On May 27, at Shining Stars, her first singles match with Io Shirai ended in defeat, but the audience highly praised it. Post-match, AZM challenged her for the Future of Stardom Championship, and on June 3 at Queen's Fes In Sapporo, the match went to a time-limit draw. From October 23 until November 4, Kid & Natsumi took part in the 2018 Goddesses of Stardom Tag League, finishing the tournament with a record of two wins, two losses, and one draw, failing to advance to the tournament finals.

On January 3, 2019, Kid lost her title to Utami Hayashishita at New Years Stars, ending her reign at 281 days. At Stardom Cinderella Tournament 2019 on April 29, she made it to the semi-finals where she fell short to Konami.

On the first night of the Stardom Cinderella Tournament 2021 from April 10, 2021, Kid defeated Momo Watanabe in the first rounds of the competition. On the second night from May 14, she fell short to Saya Kamitani in the second rounds.

==== Oedo Tai (2021–2024) ====
On the last night of the 2021 Cinderella Tournament from June 12, 2021, Kid left Stars stable after she, Koguma, Hanan, Iwatani and Rin Kadokura lost to Oedo Tai (Natsuko Tora, Konami, Fukigen Death, Ruaka & Saki Kashima) in a Ten-Woman Elimination Tag Team Match where the winner had to pick a member from the opposite unit with Oedo Tai picking Kid after she was eliminated in the end.

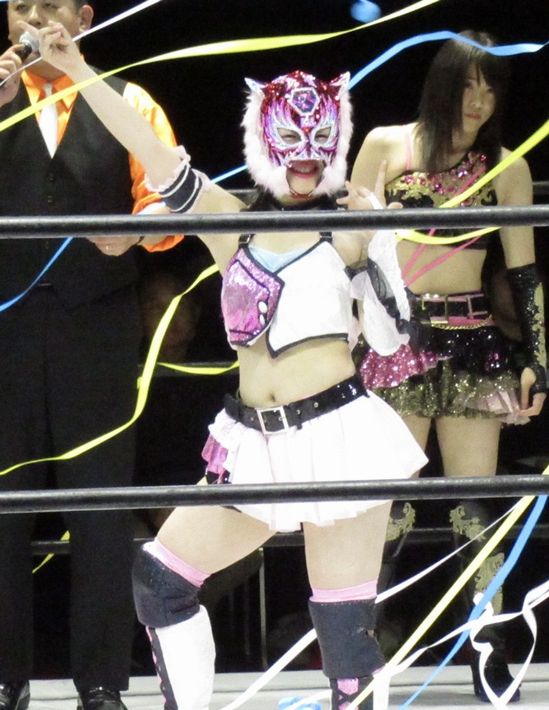
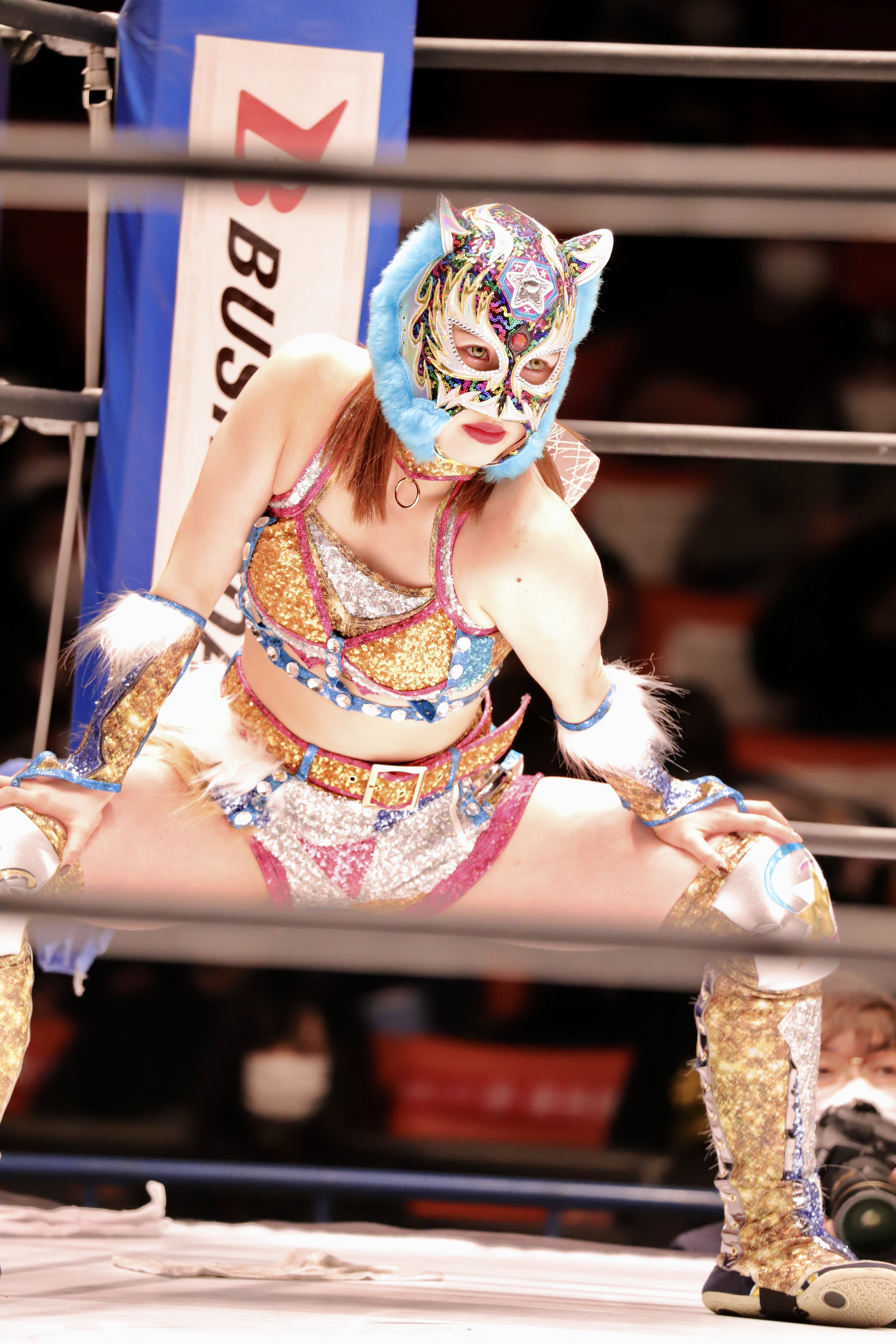
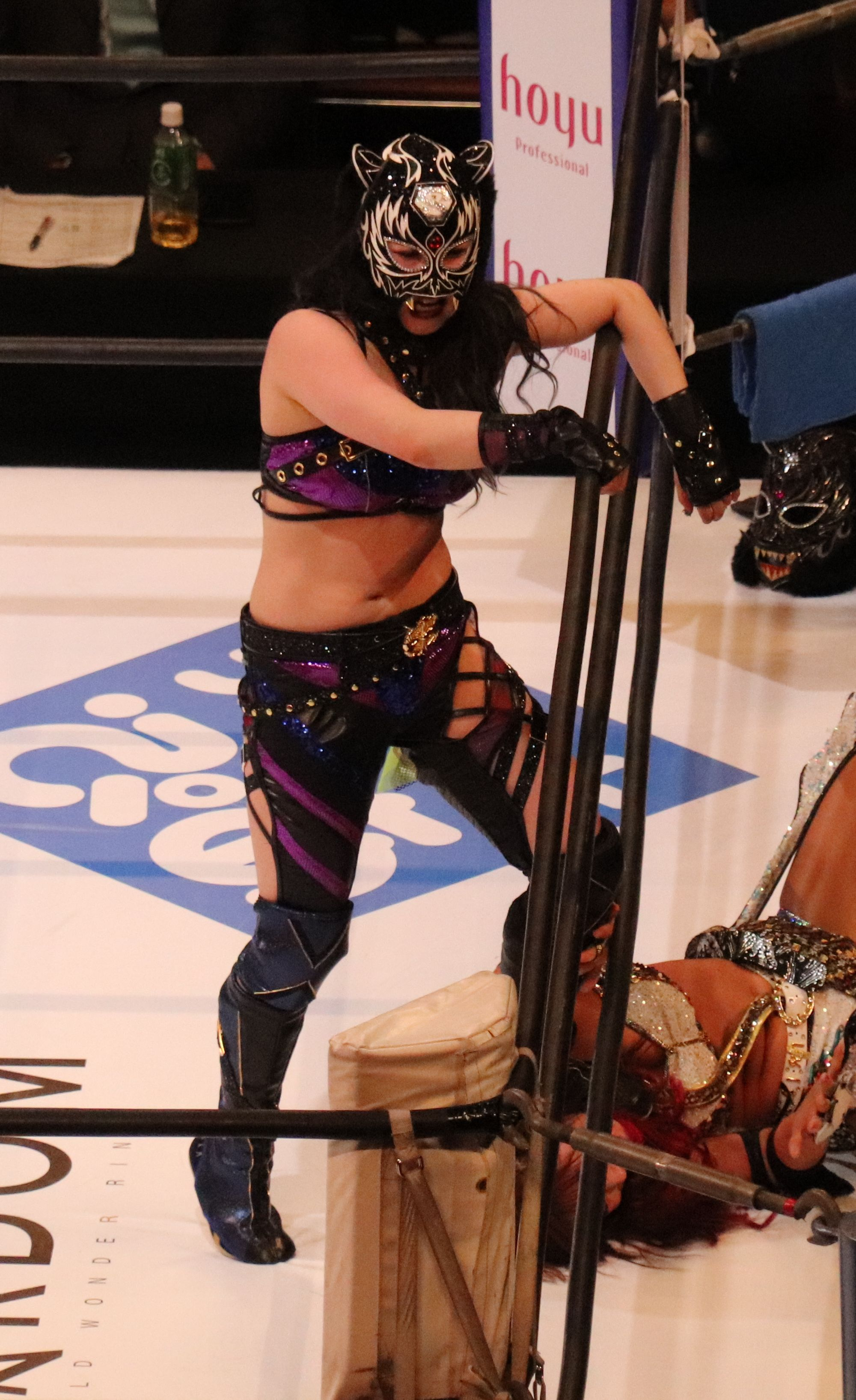
After defecting from Stars, Starlight Kid switched from her light-colored masks (left 2019 and center 2020) to a darker one (right, 2022) to depict her embracing the dark side of Oedo Tai. Her mask style, similar to the ones worn by Queen's Quest members until early 2022, was inspired by Tiger Mask.

At Yokohama Dream Cinderella 2021 in Summer on July 4, 2021, Kid rebranded her outfit to fit Oedo Tai's colors wearing a black and purple outfit and mask. She teamed up with Ruaka for the first time as an Oedo Tai member and fell short to Queen's Quest's Momo Watanabe & AZM. Kid also challenged Tam Nakano for the Wonder of Stardom Championship unsuccessfully on July 21. At the Stardom 5 Star Grand Prix 2021, Kid competed in the "Red Stars" block where she scored a total of 11 points. On August 29, on the eighth night of the Grand Prix, Kid defeated Natsupoi to win High Speed Championship. At Stardom 10th Anniversary Grand Final Osaka Dream Cinderella on October 9, 2021, Kid defended the High Speed Championship against Saki Kashima. At the 2021 Goddesses of Stardom Tag League, Kid teamed up with Ruaka as "Kurotora Kaidou" and competed in the "Blue Goddess" block where they scored a total of seven points.

Since Kawasaki Super Wars, the first event of the Stardom Super Wars trilogy which took place on November 3, 2021, Kid would enter in the quest to recruit more members into Oedo Tai which would lead to a feud with Momo Watanabe who would later be a victim of Starlight Kid's mind games as the latter's strategy to recruit members to Oedo Tai. First, Kid successfully defended the High Speed Championship against Watanabe on November 3. At Tokyo Super Wars on November 27, she defended the High Speed title again against Koguma. Kid's mind games against Watanabe eventually degenerated into an Eight-Woman Elimination Tag Team Match at in which both of them would be the captains of their respective teams. The loser captain would be forced to join the enemy unit and if Kid lost, she would also have to unmask and reveal her real name. The match took place on December 18, at Osaka Super Wars, the event which represented the last part of the "Super Wars" trilogy. With the match coming down to the wire and Queen's Quest holding a 2 to 1 advantage over Kid, a shocking moment occurred when Watanabe betrayed her Queen's Quest and hit her long-time tag team partner AZM over the head with a chair, handing the win to Oedo Tai and with Kid keeping her mask and Watanabe joining the stable. At Stardom Dream Queendom, Kid once again defended the High Speed title successfully against AZM and Koguma in a three-way match.

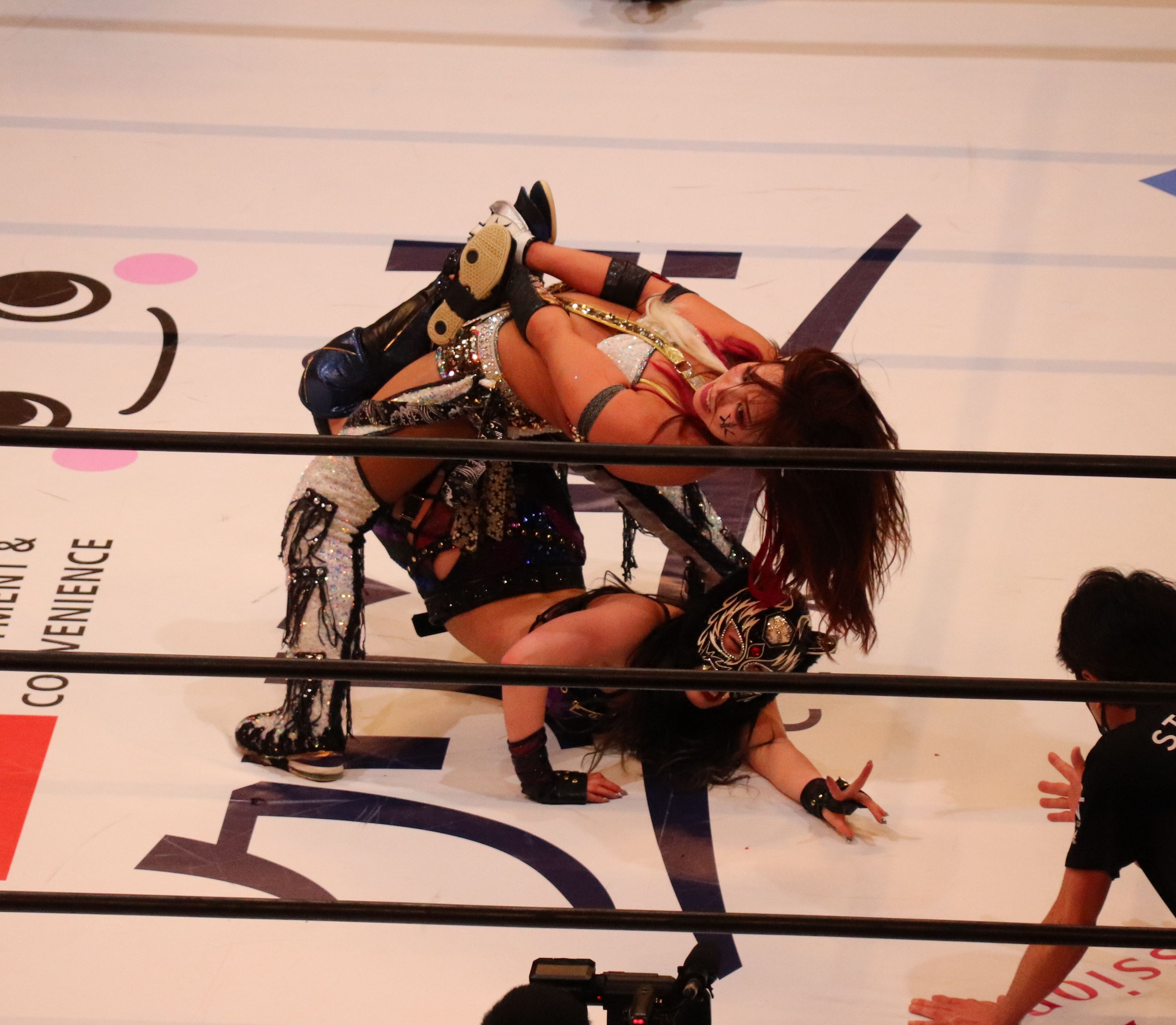
Starlight Kid facing Kairi (upper) on the second night of the Stardom World Climax 2022 from March 27.

At Stardom Nagoya Supreme Fight on January 29, 2022, Kid teamed up with Momo Watanabe and defeated Utami Hayashishita & AZM. At Stardom Cinderella Journey on February 23, 2022, she dropped the High Speed Championship to AZM. At Stardom New Blood 1 on March 11, 2022, Kid teamed up with Ruaka to defeat World Woman Wrestling Diana's Haruka Umesaki & Nanami. On the first night of the Stardom World Climax 2022 from March 26, Kid teamed up with Momo Watanabe and defeated FWC (Hazuki & Koguma) to win the Goddesses of Stardom Championship. At Stardom Cinderella Tournament 2022, Kid fell short to Natsupoi in the first rounds from April 3. At Stardom Golden Week Fight Tour on May 5, 2022, Kid & Watanabe dropped the Goddesses of Stardom Championship back to Hazuki & Koguma. At Stardom New Blood 2 on May 13, 2022, Kid teamed up with Ruaka & Rina in a losing effort against Cosmic Angels (Mina Shirakawa & Unagi Sayaka) & Haruka Umesaki. At Stardom Flashing Champions on May 28, 2022, Kid teamed up with Saki Kashima & Momo Watanabe to defeat MaiHimePoi (Maika, Himeka & Natsupoi) for the Artist of Stardom Championship. At Stardom Fight in the Top on June 26, 2022, Kid teamed up once again with Watanabe & Kashima to score their first defense of the Artist of Stardom Championship against Giulia, Maika & Mai Sakurai. At Stardom New Blood 3, Kid teamed up with Rina, Ruaka & Haruka Umesaki to defeat Cosmic Angels (Mina Shirakawa, Unagi Sayaka & Color's (Yuko Sakurai & Rina Amikura)). At Mid Summer Champions in Tokyo, the first event of the Stardom Mid Summer Champions series which took place on July 9, 2022, Kid unsuccessfully challenged Saya Kamitani for the Wonder of Stardom Championship. On the second night at Mid Summer Champions in Nagoya on July 24, Kid teamed up with Momo Watanabe & Saki Kashima to successfully defend the Artist of Stardom Championship against Giulia, Maika & Himeka. At Stardom New Blood 4 on August 26, 2022, Kid teamed up with Haruka Umesaki in a losing effort against God's Eye (Mirai & Ami Sourei). At Stardom 5 Star Grand Prix 2022, Kid competed in the "Blue Stars" block where she scored a total of 14 points.

At New Blood Premium on March 25, 2023, Starlight Kid and Karma, teaming together as Bloody Fate, became the inaugural New Blood Tag Team Champions by defeating God's Eye (Mirai and Tomoka Inaba) in the finals of the New Blood Tag Team Championship Inaugural Tournament. At New Blood 11 on September 29, Bloody Fate lost the New Blood Tag Team Championship to wing★gori. On September 29, it was announced that Kid had sustained an ankle injury and would take a leave of absence. At Stardom All Star Grand Queendom 2024 on April 27, 2024, Starlight Kid got kicked out of Oedo Tai as she was helped by Tam Nakano after being jumped by her ex-stablemates.

==== Neo Genesis (2024–present) ====
At Stardom The Conversion on June 22, 2024, AZM and Miyu Amasaki attracted the attention of Crazy Star's Suzu Suzuki and Mei Seira, and Starlight Kid who spent a couple of months as a solitary wrestler after being kicked out of Oedo Tai. On the first night of the Stardom Sapporo World Rendezvous on July 27, 2024, Kid, AZM, Seira, Suzuki and Amasaki officiated the birth of the "Neo Genesis" unit as they defeated Stars (Hazuki, Koguma, Hanan, Saya Iida and Momo Kohgo in a ten-woman tag team match as their inaugural bout. The stable was represented by AZM, Suzu Suzuki, Mei Seira, Miyu Amasaki and Starlight Kid in the Stardom 5 Star Grand Prix 2024.

=== New Japan Pro Wrestling (2022–present) ===
Kid often competes in exhibition matches organized by NJPW in partnership with Stardom. On January 5, 2022, on the second night of New Japan Pro-Wrestling (NJPW)'s Wrestle Kingdom 16, she made her first NJPW appearance where she, alongside Mayu Iwatani fell short to Tam Nakano & Saya Kamitani.

== Championships and accomplishments ==
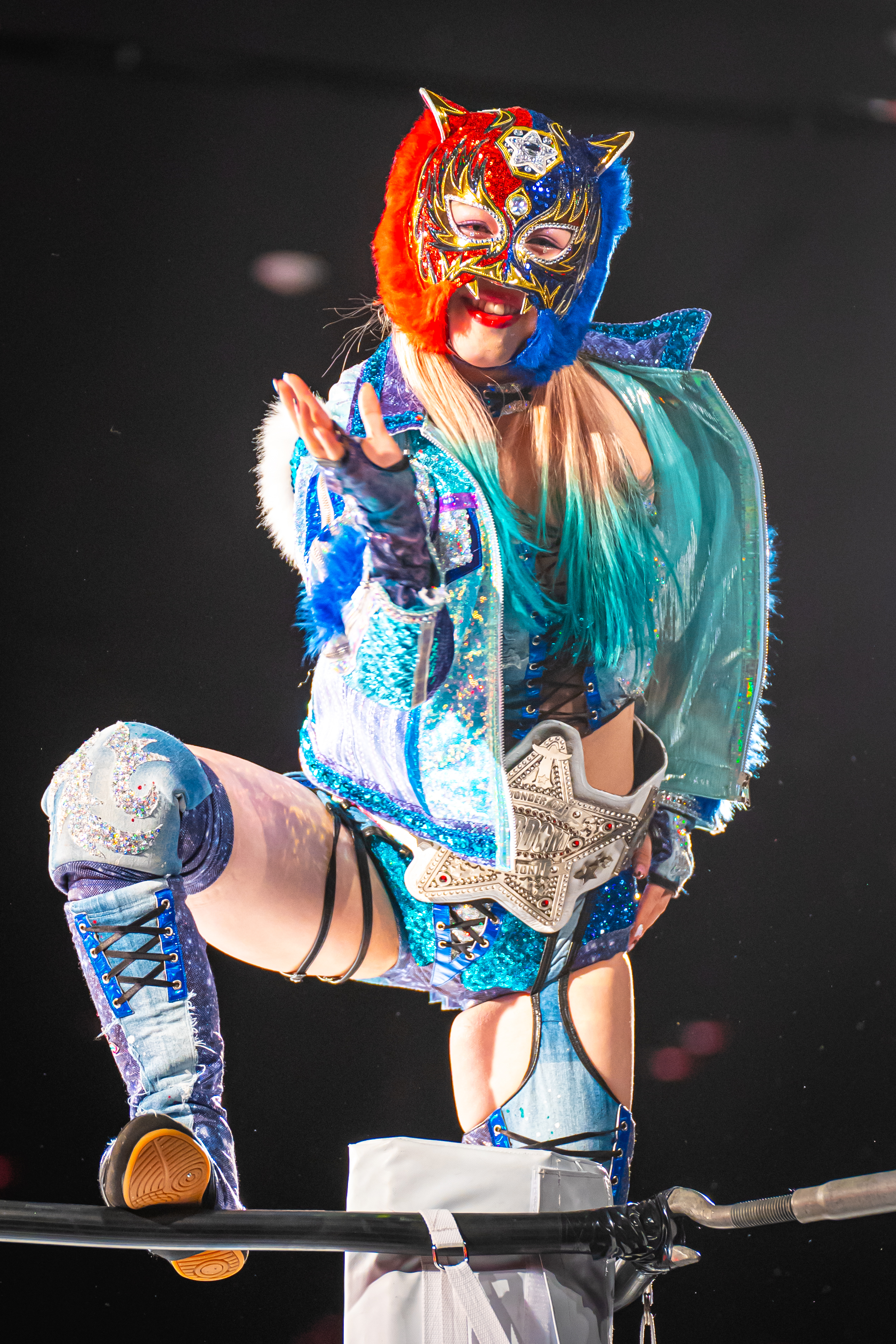
Starlight Kid as the Wonder of Stardom Champion

- Consejo Mundial de Lucha Libre
  - Copa Viva Mexico (2026)
- Pro Wrestling Illustrated
  - Ranked No. 9 of the top 150 female wrestlers in the PWI Female 150 in 2022
  - Ranked No. 51 of the top 100 female wrestlers in the PWI Female 100 in 2018
- Spark Joshi Puroresu of America
  - Spark Joshi World Championship (1 time)
- World Wonder Ring Stardom
  - Artist of Stardom Championship (2 times) – with Momo Watanabe and Saki Kashima (1) and AZM and Miyu Amasaki (1)
  - Future of Stardom Championship (1 time, inaugural)
  - Goddesses of Stardom Championship (1 time) – with Momo Watanabe
  - High Speed Championship (1 time)
  - New Blood Tag Team Championship (1 time, inaugural) – with Karma
  - Wonder of Stardom Championship (1 time)
  - Inaugural New Blood Tag Team Championship Tournament (2023) – with Karma
  - Inaugural Future of Stardom Championship Tournament (2018)
  - 5★Star GP Awards
    - Blue Stars Best Match Award (2024) vs. Saori Anou on August 15 in Blue Stars A
    - 5★Star GP Technique Award (2021)
  - Stardom Year-End Award (6 times)
    - Best Technique Award (2018)
    - Best Unit Award (2018, 2021) as part of STARS with Mayu Iwatani, Hanan, Natsumi, Shiki Shibusawa, Saki Kashima, Arisa Hoshiki and Tam Nakano (2018), as part of Oedo Tai, shared with Momo Watanabe, Natsuko Tora, Rina, Ruaka and Saki Kashima (2021)
    - Fighting Spirit Award (2022, 2025)
    - Shining Award (2021)
