= Osaka Prefectural Gymnasium =

Indoor sporting arena in Japan

Coordinates: 34°39′45″N 135°29′57″E

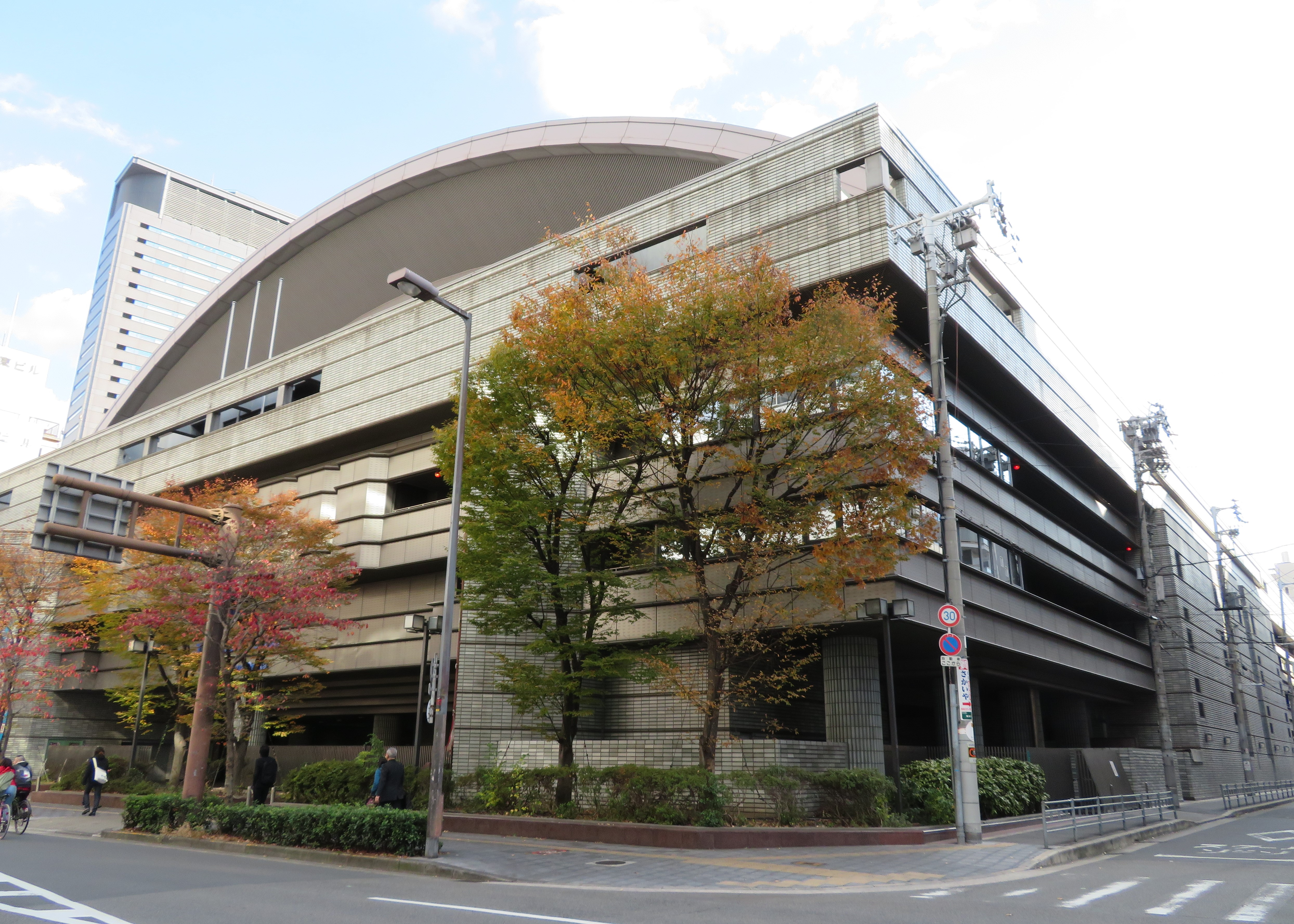
- Interactive map of Osaka Prefectural Gymnasium
- Full name: Osaka Prefectural Gymnasium
- Location: Naniwa-ku, Osaka, Japan
- Owner: Osaka Prefecture
- Operator: Nankai Building Service
- Capacity: 8,000

Construction
- Opened: January 31, 1987
- Cost

Website
- https://www.furitutaiikukaikan.ne.jp/

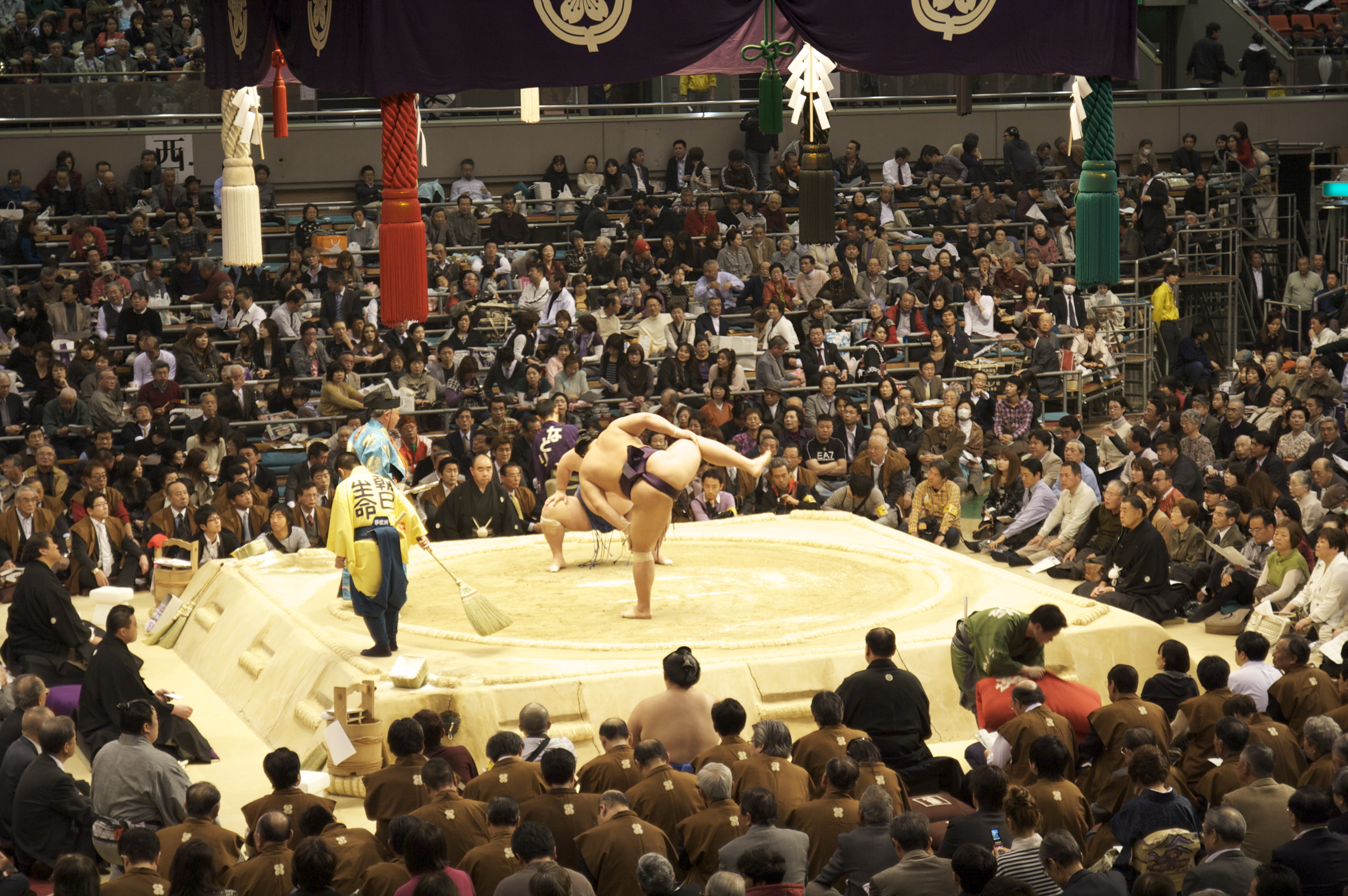
Sumo wrestling in 2010

Osaka Prefectural Gymnasium (大阪府立体育会館, Ōsaka furitsu taiikukaikan) is an indoor sporting arena located in Namba, Osaka, Japan. It first opened in 1952 and the current building was constructed in 1987. It is the venue of a professional sumo tournament (honbasho) held in March every year. The capacity of the arena is 8,000 people. Its total revenue for the 2006 fiscal year was 260 million yen, of which sumo provided 80 million.

In April 2008 the Japan Sumo Association made clear its surprise at plans by the prefectural government to demolish the gymnasium and sell the vacant lot.

In March 2012, the arena was renamed Bodymaker Colosseum (ボディメーカー コロシアム, Bodimēkā koroshiamu) after the naming rights were sold to sports apparel company BB Sports for the next three years. The name was changed back in April 2015, when BB Sports did not renew their deal. In June 2015, EDION Corporation signed a three-year deal for the arena's naming rights, renaming it Edion Arena Osaka (エディオンアリーナ大阪, Edion Arīna Ōsaka).

It has hosted several professional wrestling shows, including Osaka Hurricane from 2005 to 2012, NJPW Dominion from 2009 to 2014, NJPW Power Struggle since 2011, and The New Beginning in Osaka since 2012.

On October 12, 2019, the venue hosted the Rizin 19 mixed martial arts fight.

On February 22, 2023, the International Lethwei Federation Japan held a Lethwei event called Japan 15 – Kizuna at the venue.

== Cultural references ==
- The Osaka Prefectural Gymnasium is featured in the manga/anime series Fighting Spirit (Hajime no Ippo) as one of the venues the boxers fight at. It is also included in the video game adaptation of the series Victorious Boxers.

== Access ==
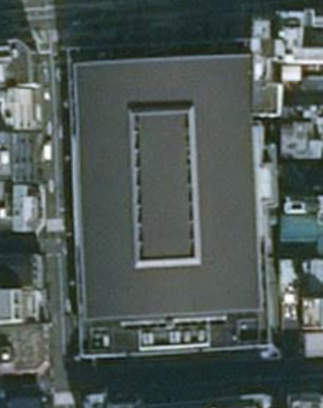
Satellite view

- Namba Station – Nankai Electric Railway (250m from South Exit), Osaka Metro (350m from Exit 5)
- Ōsaka Namba Station – Kintetsu Namba Line, Hanshin Namba Line (600m)
- JR Namba Station – West Japan Railway Company (JR West) Kansai Main Line (Yamatoji Line) (800m)
