= Stardom Namba Grand Fight =

2024 World Wonder Ring Stardom event

- Promotional poster of the event
- Promotion: World Wonder Ring Stardom
- Date: September 14, 2024
- City: Osaka, Japan
- Venue: Osaka Prefectural Gymnasium
- Attendance: 1,407

Event chronology
← Previous; New Blood 14	Next → New Blood 15

Stardom Namba Grand Fight (スターダムなんばグランドファイト, Sutādamu Nanba gurando faito) was a professional wrestling event promoted by World Wonder Ring Stardom. The event took place on September 14, 2024, in Osaka at Osaka Prefectural Gymnasium.

Ten matches were contested at the event, including three on the pre-show, and two of Stardom's ten championships were on the line. The main event saw Tam Nakano defeat Maika to retain the World of Stardom Championship. In another prominent match, Natsupoi defeated Hazuki to retain the Wonder of Stardom Championship.

== Production ==
=== Background ===
The show featured professional wrestling matches that result from scripted storylines, where wrestlers portray villains, heroes, or less distinguishable characters in the scripted events that build tension and culminate in a wrestling match or series of matches.

=== Event ===
The event started with three preshow confrontations broadcast live on Stardom's YouTube channel. In the first one, Xena defeated Rian in singles competition. In the second one, Saya Kamitani picked up a win over Mina Shirakawa, and in the third one, Waka Tsukiyama and Hanako defeated Hina and Ranna Yagami in tag team competition.

In the first main card bout, Saori Anou, Yuna Mizumori, Aya Sakura and Sayaka Kurara defeated Natsuko Tora, Ruaka and New Blood Tag Team Champions Rina and Azusa Inaba after Aya Submitted Rina in eight-woman tag team competition. Next up, Starlight Kid, High Speed Champion Mei Seira and Kohaku defeated Koguma, Saya Iida and Momo Kohgo in six-woman tag team competition. Next up, Goddess of Stardom Champions Momo Watanabe and Thekla alongside Konami defeated Syuri, Saki Kashima and Lady C in six-man tag team action. As H.A.T.E. vs. God's Eye feud continued, Syuri and Kashima challenged Watanabe and Thekla for the Goddess of Stardom Championship, and separately, Syuri laid a singles challenge to Konami. Next up, Suzu Suzuki picked up a victory over Tomoka Inaba in singles competition. Next up, Mayu Iwatani and Hanan defeated AZM and Miyu Amasaki. After the bout concluded, All Elite Wrestling's Toni Storm reached out via video to challenge Iwatani for the IWGP Women's Championship in a match set for Nagoya Golden Fight on October 5, 2024. If she successfully defends against Storm, Iwatani nominated AZM as the next challenger.

In the semi main event, Natsupoi defeated Hazuki to secure the first defense of the Wonder of Stardom Championship in that respective reign. After the bout concluded, Thekla stepped up as Natsupoi's next challenger.

In the main event, Tam Nakano defeated Maika to secure the first defense of the World of Stardom Championship in that respective reign. After the bout concluded, Suzu Suzuki came to challenge Nakano. The story reminded Nakano pulling out of the imminent world title match against Suzuki who was the 2023 Grand Prix winner which was supposed to take place at Stardom Dream Queendom 2023.

== Results ==
No.	Results	Stipulations	Times
1^{P}	Xena defeated Rian	Singles match	8:06
2^{P}	Saya Kamitani defeated Mina Shirakawa	Singles match	10:58
3^{P}	Empress Nexus Venus (Waka Tsukiyama and Hanako) defeated God's Eye (Hina and Ranna Yagami)	Tag team match	8:03
4	Cosmic Angels (Saori Anou, Yuna Mizumori, Aya Sakura and Sayaka Kurara) defeated H.A.T.E. (Natsuko Tora, Rina, Ruaka and Azusa Inaba) by submission	Eight-woman tag team match	11:56
5	Neo Genesis (Starlight Kid and Mei Seira) and Kohaku defeated Stars (Koguma, Saya Iida and Momo Kohgo)	Six-woman tag team match	8:41
6	H.A.T.E. (Momo Watanabe, Thekla and Konami) defeated God's Eye (Syuri, Saki Kashima and Lady C)	Six-woman tag team match	12:04
7	Suzu Suzuki defeated Tomoka Inaba	Singles match	13:10
8	Eye Contact (Mayu Iwatani and Hanan) defeated 02line (AZM and Miyu Amasaki)	Tag team match	14:23
9	Natsupoi (c) defeated Hazuki	Singles match for the Wonder of Stardom Championship	19:08
10	Tam Nakano (c) defeated Maika	Singles match for the World of Stardom Championship	22:32
(c) / – the champion(s) heading into the match; P / – the match was broadcast on the pre-show
