= List of major World Wonder Ring Stardom events =

List of pay-per-view events produced by World Wonder Ring Stardom

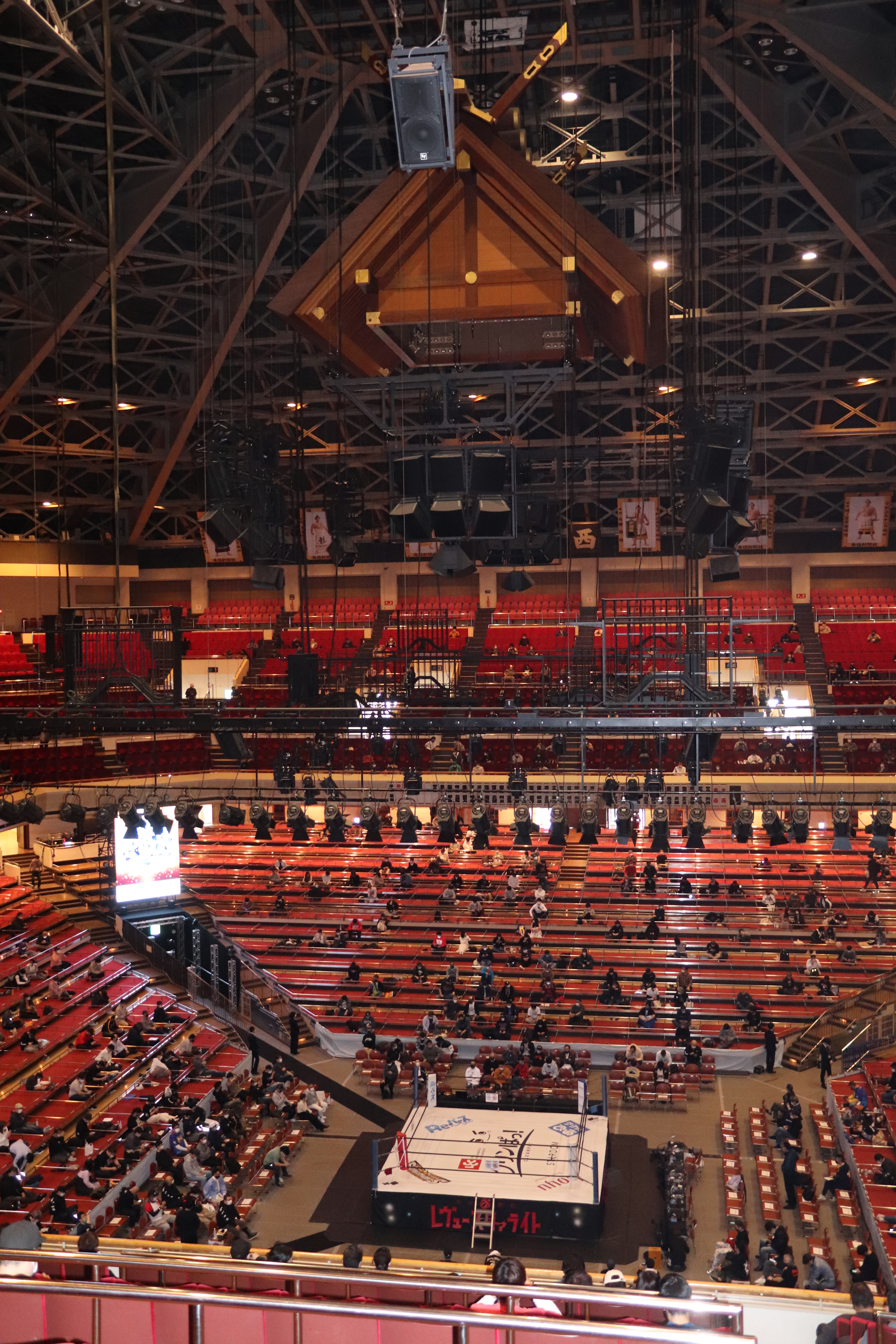
The second night of the Stardom World Climax 2022 from March 27.

World Wonder Ring Stardom is a Japanese professional wrestling promotion founded in 2010. During the years, the promotion has held various notable pay-per-view events which feature professional wrestling matches that resulted from scripted storylines, where wrestlers portrayed villains, heroes, or less distinguishable characters in the scripted events that built tension and culminated in a wrestling match or series of matches.

== Annual tournaments ==
| Tournament | Latest winner(s) | Date won | Notes |
|---|---|---|---|
| 5★Star Grand Prix | Momo Watanabe | August 23, 2025 | Round-robin tournament with a head-to-head final match. |
| Cinderella Tournament | Sayaka Kurara | March 15, 2025 | A single-elimination tournament, where the winner gets a wish fulfilled. From 2015-2020 held as a One-day event. |
| Goddesses of Stardom Tag League | wing★gori (Hanan and Saya Iida) | December 8, 2024 | Tag team tournament held in a round-robin format in 2011, 2012, 2014, 2016–2021, and in a single-elimination format in 2013 and 2015. |
| Rookie of Stardom | Yuzuki | January 3, 2024 | A tournament held at the end of the year and contested between wrestlers who made their debuts during the year. Has been held in various formats; in 2011, 2012, 2015 and 2016 as a single-elimination tournament, in 2013 and 2017 as one singles match, and in 2014 as a three-way tomoe-sen match. |

== Past events ==
=== 2018 ===
| Event | Date | Location | Venue | Main event | Ref |
|---|---|---|---|---|---|
| Stardom Cinderella Tournament 2018 | April 30, 2018 | Tokyo, Japan | Korakuen Hall | Momo Watanabe vs. Bea Priestley in the 2018 Cinderella Tournament finals | |

=== 2019 ===
| Event | Date | Location | Venue | Main event | Ref |
|---|---|---|---|---|---|
| Stardom Cinderella Tournament 2019 | April 29, 2019 | Tokyo, Japan | Korakuen Hall | Arisa Hoshiki vs. Konami in the 2019 Cinderella Tournament finals | |

=== 2020 ===
| Event | Date | Location | Venue | Main event | Ref |
|---|---|---|---|---|---|
| 9th Anniversary Show | January 19, 2020 | Tokyo, Japan | Korakuen Hall | Mayu Iwatani (c) vs. Momo Watanabe for the World of Stardom Championship | |
| The Way To Major League | February 8, 2020 | Tokyo, Japan | Korakuen Hall | Takumi Iroha vs. Mayu Iwatani | |
| Stardom Cinderella Tournament 2020 | March 24, 2020 | Tokyo, Japan | Korakuen Hall | Giulia vs. Natsuko Tora in the 2020 Cinderella Tournament finals | |
| Cinderella Summer In Tokyo | July 26, 2020 | Tokyo, Japan | Korakuen Hall | Giulia vs. Tam Nakano for the vacant Wonder of Stardom Championship | |
| Yokohama Cinderella 2020 | October 3, 2020 | Yokohama, Japan | Yokohama Budokan | Mayu Iwatani (c) vs. Syuri for the World of Stardom Championship | |
| Sendai Cinderella 2020 | November 15, 2020 | Sendai, Japan | Sendai Sun Plaza | Mayu Iwatani (c) vs. Utami Hayashishita for the World of Stardom Championship | |
| Osaka Dream Cinderella 2020 | December 20, 2020 | Osaka, Japan | Osaka Prefectural Gymnasium | Utami Hayashishita (c) vs. Momo Watanabe for the World of Stardom Championship | |

=== 2021 ===
| Event | Date | Location | Venue | Main event | Ref |
|---|---|---|---|---|---|
| 10th Anniversary Show | January 17, 2021 | Tokyo, Japan | Korakuen Hall | Utami Hayashishita (c) vs. Maika for the World of Stardom Championship | |
| All Star Dream Cinderella | March 3, 2021 | Tokyo, Japan | Nippon Budokan | Giulia (c) vs. Tam Nakano in a Hair vs. Hair match for the Wonder of Stardom Championship | |
| Yokohama Dream Cinderella | April 4, 2021 | Yokohama, Japan | Yokohama Budokan | Maika and Himeka (c) vs. Giulia and Syuri for the Goddesses of Stardom Championship | |
| Stardom Cinderella Tournament 2021 | April 10 – June 12, 2021 | Tokyo, Japan | Ota City General Gymnasium | Utami Hayashishita (c) vs. Syuri for the World of Stardom Championship | |
| Yokohama Dream Cinderella 2021 in Summer | July 4, 2021 | Yokohama, Japan | Yokohama Budokan | Utami Hayashishita (c) vs. Natsuko Tora for the World of Stardom Championship | |
| 5 Star Grand Prix 2021 | July 31 – September 25, 2021 | Various; Finals: Tokyo, Japan | Various; Finals: Ota City General Gymnasium | Momo Watanabe vs. Syuri in the 5 Star Grand Prix tournament final | |
| 10th Anniversary Grand Final Osaka Dream Cinderella | October 9, 2021 | Osaka, Japan | Osaka-jō Hall | Utami Hayashishita (c) vs. Takumi Iroha for the World of Stardom Championship | |
| 2021 Goddesses of Stardom Tag League | October 17 – November 14, 2021 | Various | Various | Stars/FWC (Hazuki and Koguma) vs. MOMOAZ (AZM and Momo Watanabe) in the Tag League final match | |
| Kawasaki Super Wars; Tokyo Super Wars; Osaka Super Wars | November 3, 2021 | Kawasaki, Japan | Kawasaki City Todoroki Arena | Utami Hayashishita (c) vs. Hazuki for the World of Stardom Championship | |
| Kawasaki Super Wars; Tokyo Super Wars; Osaka Super Wars | November 27, 2021 | Tokyo, Japan | Yoyogi National Gymnasium | Utami Hayashishita (c) vs. Maika for the World of Stardom Championship | |
| Kawasaki Super Wars; Tokyo Super Wars; Osaka Super Wars | December 18, 2021 | Osaka, Japan | Osaka Prefectural Gymnasium | MaiHimePoi (Maika, Natsupoi and Himeka) (c) vs. Stars (Mayu Iwatani, Hazuki and Koguma) in a ladder match for the ¥10 Million Unit Tournament briefcase and Artist of Stardom Championship | |
| Dream Queendom | December 29, 2021 | Tokyo, Japan | Ryōgoku Kokugikan | Utami Hayashishita (World of Stardom) vs. Syuri (SWA) in a Winner Takes All match for the World of Stardom Championship and SWA World Championship | |

=== 2022 ===
| Event | Date | Location | Venue | Main event | Ref |
|---|---|---|---|---|---|
| Nagoya Supreme Fight | January 29, 2022 | Nagoya, Japan | Aichi Prefectural Gymnasium | Syuri (c) vs. Mirai for the World of Stardom Championship | |
| Cinderella Journey | February 23, 2022 | Nagaoka, Japan | City Hall Plaza Aore Nagaoka | Saya Kamitani (c) vs. Natsupoi for the Wonder of Stardom Championship | |
| New Blood 1 | March 11, 2022 | Tokyo, Japan | Shinagawa Intercity Hall | Utami Hayashishita vs. Miyu Amasaki | |
| World Climax 2022 | March 26, 2022 | Tokyo, Japan | Ryōgoku Kokugikan | Syuri (c) vs. Giulia for the World of Stardom Championship | |
| World Climax 2022 | March 27, 2022 | Tokyo, Japan | Ryōgoku Kokugikan | Syuri (c) vs. Mayu Iwatani for the World of Stardom Championship | |
| Stardom Cinderella Tournament 2022 | April 3 – 29, 2022 | Various | Various | Syuri (c) vs. Himeka for the World of Stardom Championship | |
| Golden Week Fight Tour | May 5, 2022 | Fukuoka, Japan | Fukuoka Kokusai Center | Saya Kamitani (c) vs. Maika for the Wonder of Stardom Championship | |
| New Blood 2 | May 13, 2022 | Tokyo, Japan | Tokyo New Pier Hall | Cosmic Angels (Mina Shirakawa, Unagi Sayaka) and Haruka Umesaki vs. Oedo Tai (Starlight Kid, Ruaka and Rina) | |
| Flashing Champions | May 28, 2022 | Tokyo, Japan | Ota City General Gymnasium | Syuri (c) vs. Risa Sera for the World of Stardom Championship | |
| Fight in the Top | June 26, 2022 | Nagoya, Japan | Nagoya International Conference Hall | Stars (Mayu Iwatani, Koguma and Hazuki) vs. Queen's Quest (Utami Hayashishita, AZM and Saya Kamitani) in a steel cage match | |
| New Blood 3 | July 8, 2022 | Tokyo, Japan | Shinagawa Intercity Hall | Giulia vs. Miyu Amasaki | |
| Mid Summer Champions in Tokyo | July 9, 2022 | Tokyo, Japan | Tachikawa Stage Garden | Syuri (c) vs. Momo Watanabe for the World of Stardom Championship | |
| Stardom in Showcase vol.1 | July 23, 2022 | Nagoya, Japan | Nagoya International Conference Hall | Saya Kamitani vs. Starlight Kid vs. Yuu in a casket match | |
| Mid Summer Champions in Nagoya | July 24, 2022 | Nagoya, Japan | Nagoya International Conference Hall | Syuri (c) vs. Tam Nakano for the World of Stardom Championship | |
| 5 Star Grand Prix 2022 | July 30, 2022 – October 1, 2022 | Various; Finals: Tokyo, Japan | Various; Finals: Musashino Forest Sport Plaza | Giulia vs. Tam Nakano in the 5 Star Grand Prix tournament final | |
| Stardom x Stardom: Nagoya Midsummer Encounter | August 21, 2022 | Nagoya, Japan | Aichi Prefectural Gymnasium | Syuri (c) vs. Nanae Takahashi for the World of Stardom Championship | |
| New Blood 4 | August 26, 2022 | Tokyo, Japan | Shinagawa Intercity Hall | Miyu Amasaki vs. Tam Nakano | |
| Stardom in Showcase vol.2 | September 25, 2022 | Tokyo, Japan | Belle Salle Takadanobaba | Grim Reaper Army (Yuu, Nanae Takahashi and Yuna Manase) vs. Rossy Ogawa Bodyguard Army (Syuri and Queen's Quest (Utami Hayashishita and Lady C)) | |
| New Blood 5 | October 19, 2022 | Tokyo, Japan | Shinjuku Sumitomo Hall | Hanan (c) vs. Ami Sourei for the Future of Stardom Championship | |
| Hiroshima Goddess Festival | November 3, 2022 | Hiroshima, Japan | Hiroshima Sun Plaza | Syuri (c) vs. Maika for the World of Stardom Championship | |
| Gold Rush 2022 | November 19, 2022 | Osaka, Japan | Osaka Prefectural Gymnasium | Donna Del Mondo (Giulia, Thekla and Mai Sakurai) vs. Stars (Mayu Iwatani, Hazuki and Koguma) in a Tables, Ladders, and Chairs match in the Moneyball tournament final | |
| Stardom in Showcase vol.3 | November 26, 2022 | Kawasaki, Japan | Kawasaki City Todoroki Arena | Neo Stardom Army (Nanae Takahashi, Yuu and Reaper Mask) vs. Donna Del Mondo (Giulia, Thekla and Mai Sakurai) in a Exploding Coffin match | |
| 2022 Goddesses of Stardom Tag League | October 23 – December 4, 2022 | Chiba, Japan | Makuhari Messe International Exhibition Hall | 7Upp (Nanae Takahashi and Yuu) vs. AphrOditE (Utami Hayashishita and Saya Kamitani) in the Tag League final match | |
| New Blood 6 | December 16, 2022 | Tokyo, Japan | Shinjuku Sumitomo Hall | Ami Sourei (c) vs. Ruaka for the Future of Stardom Championship | |
| Dream Queendom 2022 | December 29, 2022 | Tokyo, Japan | Ryōgoku Kokugikan | Syuri (c) vs. Giulia for the World of Stardom Championship | |

=== 2023 ===
| Event | Date | Location | Venue | Main event | Ref |
|---|---|---|---|---|---|
| New Blood 7 | January 20, 2023 | Tokyo, Japan | Belle Salle Takadanobaba | God's Eye (Mirai and Tomoka Inaba) vs. wing★gori (Saya Iida and Hanan) in a New Blood Tag Team Championship tournament quarterfinals match | |
| Supreme Fight | February 4, 2023 | Osaka, Japan | Osaka Prefectural Gymnasium | Giulia (c) vs. Suzu Suzuki for the World of Stardom Championship | |
| Stardom in Showcase vol.4 | February 26, 2023 | Kobe, Japan | Kobe International Exhibition Hall | Stars (Mayu Iwatani, Hazuki and Koguma) vs. Queen's Quest (Utami Hayashishita, Saya Kamitani and Miyu Amasaki) vs. Oedo Tai (Natsuko Tora, Starlight Kid and Momo Watanabe) | |
| Triangle Derby 2023 | January 3, 2023 – March 4, 2023 | Various; Finals: Tokyo, Japan | Various; Finals: Yoyogi National Gymnasium | Prominence (Suzu Suzuki, Risa Sera and Hiragi Kurumi) (c) vs. Abarenbo GE (Syuri, Mirai and Ami Sourei) in the Triangle Derby finals for the Artist of Stardom Championship | |
| New Blood Premium | March 25, 2023 | Yokohama, Japan | Yokohama Budokan | Cosmic Angels (Tam Nakano and Waka Tsukiyama) vs. Nanae Takahashi and Kairi | |
| Stardom Cinderella Tournament 2023 | March 26 – April 15, 2023 | Various | Various | Donna Del Mondo (Giulia, Maika, Himeka Arita and Thekla) vs. Cosmic Angels (Tam Nakano, Natsupoi, Mina Shirakawa and Saki) | |
| All Star Grand Queendom | April 23, 2023 | Yokohama, Japan | Yokohama Arena | Giulia (c) vs. Tam Nakano for the World of Stardom Championship | |
| Fukuoka Goddess Legend | May 4, 2023 | Fukuoka, Japan | Fukuoka Kokusai Center | Mina Shirakawa (c) vs. Natsupoi for the Wonder of Stardom Championship | |
| New Blood 8 | May 12, 2023 | Tokyo, Japan | Shinagawa Intercity Hall | Tam Nakano vs. Tam Nakano (Nao Ishikawa) | |
| Flashing Champions | May 27, 2023 | Tokyo, Japan | Ota City General Gymnasium | Tam Nakano (World) vs. Mina Shirakawa (Wonder) for the World of Stardom Championship and Wonder of Stardom Championship | |
| New Blood 9 | June 2, 2023 | Tokyo, Japan | Shinagawa Intercity Hall | Rina (c) vs. Lady C for the Future of Stardom Championship | |
| Sunshine 2023 | June 25, 2023 | Tokyo, Japan | Yoyogi National Gymnasium | Queen's Quest (Lady C, Hina, AphrOditE (Utami Hayashishita and Saya Kamitani) and 02line (AZM and Miyu Amasaki)) vs. Oedo Tai (Gold Ship (Natsuko Tora, Saki Kashima and Momo Watanabe) and YoungOED (Starlight Kid, Ruaka and Rina)) in a Steel Cage match | |
| Mid Summer Champions | July 2, 2023 | Yokohama, Japan | Yokohama Budokan | Saori Anou vs. Natsupoi in a Strap match | |
| 5 Star Grand Prix 2023 | July 23 – September 30, 2023 | Various; Finals: Yokohama, Japan | Various; Finals: Yokohama Budokan | Suzu Suzuki vs. Maika in the 5 Star Grand Prix tournament final | |
| Stardom x Stardom: Osaka Summer Team | August 13, 2023 | Osaka, Japan | Osaka Prefectural Gymnasium | Tam Nakano (c) vs. Megan Bayne for the World of Stardom Championship | |
| New Blood 10 | August 18, 2023 | Tokyo, Japan | Shinagawa Intercity Hall | Rina (c) vs. Waka Tsukiyama for the Future of Stardom Championship | |
| Midsummer Festival | August 19, 2023 | Tokyo, Japan | Ota City General Gymnasium | Jaguar Yokota and NanaMomo (Momoe Nakanishi and Nanae Takahashi) vs. Black Desire (Momo Watanabe and Starlight Kid) and Yuu | |
| 5Star Special in Hiroshima | September 3, 2023 | Hiroshima, Japan | Hiroshima Sun Plaza | Giulia (c) vs. Risa Sera for the Strong Women's Championship | |
| Dream Tag Festival | September 10, 2023 | Yokohama, Japan | Yokohama Budokan | Mayu Iwatani and Saki Kashima vs. AZM and Starlight Kid | |
| New Blood 11 | September 28, 2023 | Tokyo, Japan | Shinagawa Intercity Hall | Unique Glare (Karma and Starlight Kid) (c) vs. 02line (AZM and Miyu Amasaki) vs. wing★gori (Saya Iida and Hanan) for the New Blood Tag Team Championship | |
| Nagoya Golden Fight | October 9, 2023 | Nagoya, Japan | Aichi Prefectural Gymnasium | Tam Nakano (c) vs. Natsuko Tora for the World of Stardom Championship | |
| 2023 Goddesses of Stardom Tag League | October 15 – November 12, 2023 | Various; Finals: Nagaoka, Japan | Various; Finals: City Hall Plaza Aore Nagaoka | Divine Kingdom (Maika and Megan Bayne) vs. Crazy Star (Mei Seira and Suzu Suzuki) in the Tag League final match | |
| Halloween Dark Night | October 29, 2023 | Tokyo, Japan | Tachikawa Stage Garden | Yuu vs. Megan Bayne vs. Maika vs. Mayu Iwatani | |
| New Blood West 1 | November 17, 2023 | Osaka, Japan | Azalea Taisho Hall | Rina (c) vs. Hanako for the Future of Stardom Championship | |
| Gold Rush 2023 | November 18, 2023 | Osaka, Japan | Osaka Prefectural Gymnasium | Baribari Bombers (Giulia, Thekla and Mai Sakurai) vs. Stars (Hazuki, Hanan and Saya Iida) in a Tables, Ladders, and Chairs Moneyball tournament finals for the Artist of Stardom Championship | |
| Nagoya Big Winter | December 2, 2023 | Nagoya, Japan | Aichi Prefectural Gymnasium | Suzu Suzuki vs. Hazuki for a World of Stardom Championship shot at Dream Queendom | |
| New Blood 12 | December 25, 2023 | Tokyo, Japan | Shinagawa Intercity Hall | wing★gori (Hanan and Saya Iida) (c) vs. Ami Sohrei and Lady C for the New Blood Tag Team Championship | |
| Dream Queendom 2023 | December 29, 2023 | Tokyo, Japan | Ryōgoku Kokugikan | Suzu Suzuki vs. Maika for the vacant World of Stardom Championship | |

=== 2024 ===
| Event | Date | Location | Venue | Main event | Ref |
|---|---|---|---|---|---|
| New Years Stars | January 3, 2024 | Yokohama, Japan | Yokohama Budokan | Baribari Bombers (Giulia, Thekla and Mai Sakurai) (c) vs. Abarenbo GE (Syuri, Mirai and Ami Sohrei) in the Triangle Derby finals for the Artist of Stardom Championship | |
| Ittenyon Stardom Gate | January 4, 2024 | Tokyo, Japan | Tokyo Dome City Hall | Mayu Iwatani (c) vs. Syuri for the IWGP Women's Championship | |
| Supreme Fight | February 4, 2024 | Osaka, Japan | Osaka Prefectural Gymnasium | Maika (c) vs. Saya Kamitani for the World of Stardom Championship | |
| Stardom Cinderella Tournament 2024 | March 9 – 20, 2024 | Various | Various | Maika (c) vs. Utami Hayashishita for the World of Stardom Championship | |
| American Dream 2024 | April 4, 2024 | Philadelphia, Pennsylvania, United States | 2300 Arena | Maika (c) vs. Megan Bayne for the World of Stardom Championship | |
| All Star Grand Queendom | April 27, 2024 | Yokohama, Japan | Yokohama Buntai | Maika (c) vs. Momo Watanabe in a two out of three falls match for the World of Stardom Championship | |
| Flashing Champions | May 18, 2024 | Yokohama, Japan | Yokohama Budokan | Saori Anou (c) vs. Ami Sohrei for the Wonder of Stardom Championship | |
| New Blood 13 | June 21, 2024 | Tokyo, Japan | Tokyo New Pier Hall | wing★gori (Hanan and Saya Iida) (c) vs. Cosmic Angels (Aya Sakura and Sayaka Kurara) for the New Blood Tag Team Championship | |
| The Conversion | June 22, 2024 | Tokyo, Japan | Yoyogi National Gymnasium | Maika (c) vs. Xena for the World of Stardom Championship | |
| Sapporo World Rendezvous | July 27, 2024 | Sapporo, Japan | Chateraise Gateaux Kingdom Sapporo | Saori Anou (c) vs. Natsupoi for the Wonder of Stardom Championship | |
| Sapporo World Rendezvous | July 28, 2024 | Sapporo, Japan | Chateraise Gateaux Kingdom Sapporo | Maika (c) vs. Natsuko Tora for the World of Stardom Championship | |
| 5 Star Grand Prix 2024 | August 10 – 31, 2024 | Various; Finals: Tokyo, Japan | Various; Finals: Musashino Forest Sport Plaza | Saya Kamitani vs. Maika in the 5 Star Grand Prix tournament final | |
| New Blood 14 | September 13, 2024 | Nagoya, Japan | Chunichi Hall | H.A.T.E. (Rina and Azusa Inaba) vs. Cosmic Angels (Aya Sakura and Yuna Mizumori) | |
| Namba Grand Fight | September 14, 2024 | Osaka, Japan | Osaka Prefectural Gymnasium | Tam Nakano (c) vs. Maika for the World of Stardom Championship | |
| New Blood 15 | September 29, 2024 | Tokorozawa, Japan | Japan Pavilion Hall A | Rina (c) vs. Aya Sakura for the Future of Stardom Championship | |
| Nagoya Golden Fight | October 5, 2024 | Nagoya, Japan | Aichi Prefectural Gymnasium | Tam Nakano (c) vs. Suzu Suzuki for the World of Stardom Championship | |
| New Blood 16 | October 19, 2024 | Tokyo, Japan | Belle Salle Takadanobaba | H.A.T.E. (Rina and Azusa Inaba) (c) vs. Reckless Fantasy (Waka Tsukiyama and Hanako) for the New Blood Tag Team Championship | |
| New Blood West 2 | November 16, 2024 | Osaka, Japan | Azalea Taisho Hall | Devil Princess (Rina and Azusa Inaba) (c) vs. God's Eye (Lady C and Ranna Yagami) for the New Blood Tag Team Championship | |
| 2024 Goddesses of Stardom Tag League | October 26 – December 8, 2024 | Various; Finals: Shizuoka, Japan | Various; Finals: Act City Hamamatsu Exhibition Event Hall | Hai High Mate (Maika and Hanako) vs. wing★gori (Hanan and Saya Iida) in the Tag League final match | |
| New Blood 17 | December 26, 2024 | Tokyo, Japan | Tokyo New Pier Hall | H.A.T.E. (Rina and Azusa Inaba) (c) vs. Reckless Fantasy (Waka Tsukiyama and Hanako) for the New Blood Tag Team Championship | |
| Dream Queendom 2024 | December 29, 2024 | Tokyo, Japan | Ryogoku Sumo Hall | Tam Nakano (c) vs Saya Kamitani for the World of Stardom Championship | |

=== 2025 ===
| Event | Date | Location | Venue | Main event | Ref |
|---|---|---|---|---|---|
| New Year Dream | January 3, 2025 | Tokyo, Japan | Tokyo Garden Theater | Neo Genesis (Suzu Suzuki and Starlight Kid) vs. H.A.T.E. (Saya Kamitani and Momo Watanabe) | |
| Supreme Fight | February 2, 2025 | Tokyo, Japan | Korakuen Hall | Saya Kamitani (c) vs. Suzu Suzuki for the World of Stardom Championship | |
| New Blood 18 | February 5, 2025 | Tokyo, Japan | Tokyo Square | God's Eye (Ranna Yagami and Nanami) and Himiko vs. Cosmic Angels (Yuna Mizumori, Aya Sakura and Sayaka Kurara) | |
| Path of Thunder | February 24, 2025 | Utsunomiya, Japan | Light Cube Utsunomiya | Starlight Kid (c) vs. Rina for the Wonder of Stardom Championship | |
| New Blood 19 | March 1, 2025 | Tokyo, Japan | Shinagawa Intercity Hall | Rice or Bread (Waka Tsukiyama and Hanako) (c) vs. Nanami and Himiko for the New Blood Tag Team Championship | |
| Stardom Cinderella Tournament 2025 | March 8 – 15, 2025 | Various; Finals: Tokyo, Japan | Various; Finals: Ota City General Gymnasium | Starlight Kid (c) vs. Konami for the Wonder of Stardom Championship | |
| New Blood 20 | March 27, 2025 | Tokyo, Japan | Bellesalle Shibuya First | Rice or Bread (Waka Tsukiyama and Hanako) (c) vs. Sakuradamon (Aya Sakura and Yuna Mizumori) for the New Blood Tag Team Championship | |
| American Dream 2025 | April 17, 2025 | Enterprise, Nevada | Silverton Veil Pavilion | Maika vs. Thekla | |
| American Dream 2025 | April 18, 2025 | Paradise, Nevada | MEET Las Vegas | Hai High Mate (Hanako and Maika) and Megan Bayne vs. H.A.T.E. (Momo Watanabe and Konami) and Kalientita | |
| All Star Grand Queendom | April 27, 2025 | Yokohama, Japan | Yokohama Arena | Saya Kamitani (c) vs. Tam Nakano in a Career vs. Career match for the World of Stardom Championship | |
| New Blood 21 | May 9, 2025 | Tokyo, Japan | Shin-Kiba 1st Ring | God's Eye (Hina, Tomoka Inaba and Nanami) vs. H.A.T.E. (Rina, Azusa Inaba and Fukigen Death) | |
| New Blood 22 | June 4, 2025 | Tokyo, Japan | Tokyo Square | Rice or Bread (Waka Tsukiyama and Hanako) (c) vs. Himiko and Yuma Makoto for the New Blood Tag Team Championship | |
| The Conversion | June 21, 2025 | Tokyo, Japan | Yoyogi National Gymnasium | Syuri (c) vs. Sareee for the IWGP Women's Championship | |
| New Blood 23 | July 4, 2025 | Tokyo, Japan | Tokyo Square | Rice or Bread (Waka Tsukiyama and Hanako) (c) vs. Peach & Lily (Momo Kohgo and Yuria Hime) for the New Blood Tag Team Championship | |
| Sapporo World Rendezvous | July 21, 2025 | Sapporo, Japan | Chateraise Gateaux Kingdom Sapporo | Saya Kamitani (c) vs. Natsupoi for the World of Stardom Championship | |
| 5 Star Grand Prix 2025 | July 27 – August 23, 2025 | Various; Finals: Tokyo, Japan | Various; Finals: Ota City General Gymnasium | Momo Watanabe vs. AZM in the 5 Star Grand Prix tournament final | |
| Stardom to the World | September 6, 2025 | Yokohama, Japan | Yokohama Budokan | Saya Kamitani (c) vs. Bea Priestley for the World of Stardom Championship | |
| New Blood 24 | October 4, 2025 | Tokyo, Japan | Belle Salle Takadanobaba | Tae Honma vs. Ranna Yagami | |
| New Blood 25 | October 17, 2025 | Osaka, Japan | Azalea Taisho Hall | Empress Nexus Venus (Waka Tsukiyama, Hanako and Rian) vs. Cosmic Angels (Yuna Mizumori, Aya Sakura and Sayaka Kurara) | |
| New Blood 26 | October 30, 2025 | Tokyo, Japan | Kanda Myojin Hall | Rice or Bread (Waka Tsukiyama and Hanako) (c) vs. Sakurara (Aya Sakura and Sayaka Kurara) for the New Blood Tag Team Championship | |
| Crimson Nightmare | November 3, 2025 | Tokyo, Japan | Ota City General Gymnasium | Saya Kamitani (c) vs. Momo Watanabe for the World of Stardom Championship and NJPW Strong Women's Championship | |
| New Blood 27 | December 25, 2025 | Tokyo, Japan | Bellesalle Shibuya First | Hanako (c) vs. Rian for the Future of Stardom Championship | |
| Dream Queendom 2025 | December 29, 2025 | Tokyo, Japan | Ryogoku Kokugikan | Saya Kamitani (c) vs. Saori Anou for the World of Stardom Championship | |

=== 2026 ===
| Event | Date | Location | Venue | Main event | Ref |
|---|---|---|---|---|---|
| New Year Dream | January 3, 2026 | Tokyo, Japan | Shinjuku Face | 02line (AZM and Miyu Amasaki) vs. FWC (Hazuki and Koguma) vs. Sareee and Miku Kanae in a no. 1 contendership match for the Goddesses of Stardom Championship | |
| New Year Dream | January 3, 2026 | Tokyo, Japan | Shinjuku Face | God's Eye (Hina, Lady C and Tomoka Inaba) vs. Cosmic Angels (Yuna Mizumori, Aya Sakura and Sayaka Kurara) | |
| New Blood 28 | February 3, 2026 | Tokyo, Japan | Tokyo Square | Sakurara (Aya Sakura and Sayaka Kurara) (c) vs. Yuna Mizumori and Anne Kanaya for the New Blood Tag Team Championship | |
| New Blood 29 | February 4, 2026 | Tokyo, Japan | Tokyo Square | Hanako vs. Akira Kurogane | |
| Supreme Fight | February 7, 2026 | Osaka, Japan | Osaka Prefectural Gymnasium | Saya Kamitani (c) vs. Starlight Kid for the World of Stardom Championship | |
| Stardom Cinderella Tournament 2026 | March 6 – 15, 2026 | Various; Finals: Yokohama, Japan | Various; Finals: Yokohama Budokan | Cosmic Angels (Sayaka Kurara and Natsupoi) vs. H.A.T.E. (Saya Kamitani and Konami) | |
| New Blood 30 | March 25, 2026 | Tokyo, Japan | Shin-Kiba 1st Ring | Ranna Yagami (c) vs. Aya Sakura for the Future of Stardom Championship | |
| American Dream 2026 | April 17, 2026 | Paradise, Nevada | Pearl Theatre | Neo Genesis (AZM, Starlight Kid and Mei Seira) vs. Kris Statlander, Willow Nightingale and Harley Cameron | |
| All Star Grand Queendom | April 26, 2026 | Yokohama, Japan | Yokohama Arena | Saya Kamitani (c) vs. Sayaka Kurara for the World of Stardom Championship | |
| Queens Dynasty | May 23, 2026 | Inazawa, Japan | Toyoda Gosei Memorial Gymnasium | Sayaka Kurara (c) vs. Maki Itoh for the World of Stardom Championship | |
| The Conversion | June 20, 2026 | Tokyo, Japan | Yoyogi National Gymnasium | Sayaka Kurara (c) vs. Suzu Suzuki for the World of Stardom Championship | |
| 5 Star Grand Prix 2026 | July 18 – August 23, 2026 | Various; Finals: Tokyo, Japan | Various; Finals: Ryogoku Kokugikan | Starlight Kid vs. Rina in the 5 Star Grand Prix tournament final | |
| Stardom to the World | September 12, 2026 | Yokohama, Japan | Yokohama Budokan | Suzu Suzuki (c) vs. Natsuko Tora for the World of Stardom Championship | . |
| Path of Thunder | October 18, 2026 | Utsunomiya, Japan | Light Cube Utsunomiya | Hanan (c) vs. Hina for the Wonder of Stardom Championship | |
| Crimson Nightmare | October 29, 2026 | Tokyo, Japan | Ota City General Gymnasium | Suzu Suzuki (c) vs. Starlight Kid for the World of Stardom Championship | |

== Upcoming events ==
=== 2026 ===
| Event | Date | Location | Venue | Main event | Ref |
|---|---|---|---|---|---|
| Dream Queendom | December 29, 2026 | Tokyo, Japan | Ryogoku Kokugikan | TBA | |

=== 2027 ===
| Event | Date | Location | Venue | Main event | Ref |
|---|---|---|---|---|---|
| New Year Dream | January 3, 2027 | Yokohama, Japan | Yokohama Budokan | TBA | |
| Supreme Fight | February 11, 2027 | Osaka, Japan | Osaka Prefectural Gymnasium | TBA | |
| Scarlett Bloom | March 6, 2027 | Hiroshima, Japan | Hiroshima Sun Plaza | TBA | |
| Stardom Cinderella Tournament | March 16 – 22, 2027 | Various; Finals: Yokohama, Japan | Various; Finals: Yokohama Budokan | TBA | |
| All Star Grand Queendom | April 25, 2027 | Yokohama, Japan | Yokohama Arena | TBA | |

== Shared events ==
=== New Japan Pro Wrestling ===
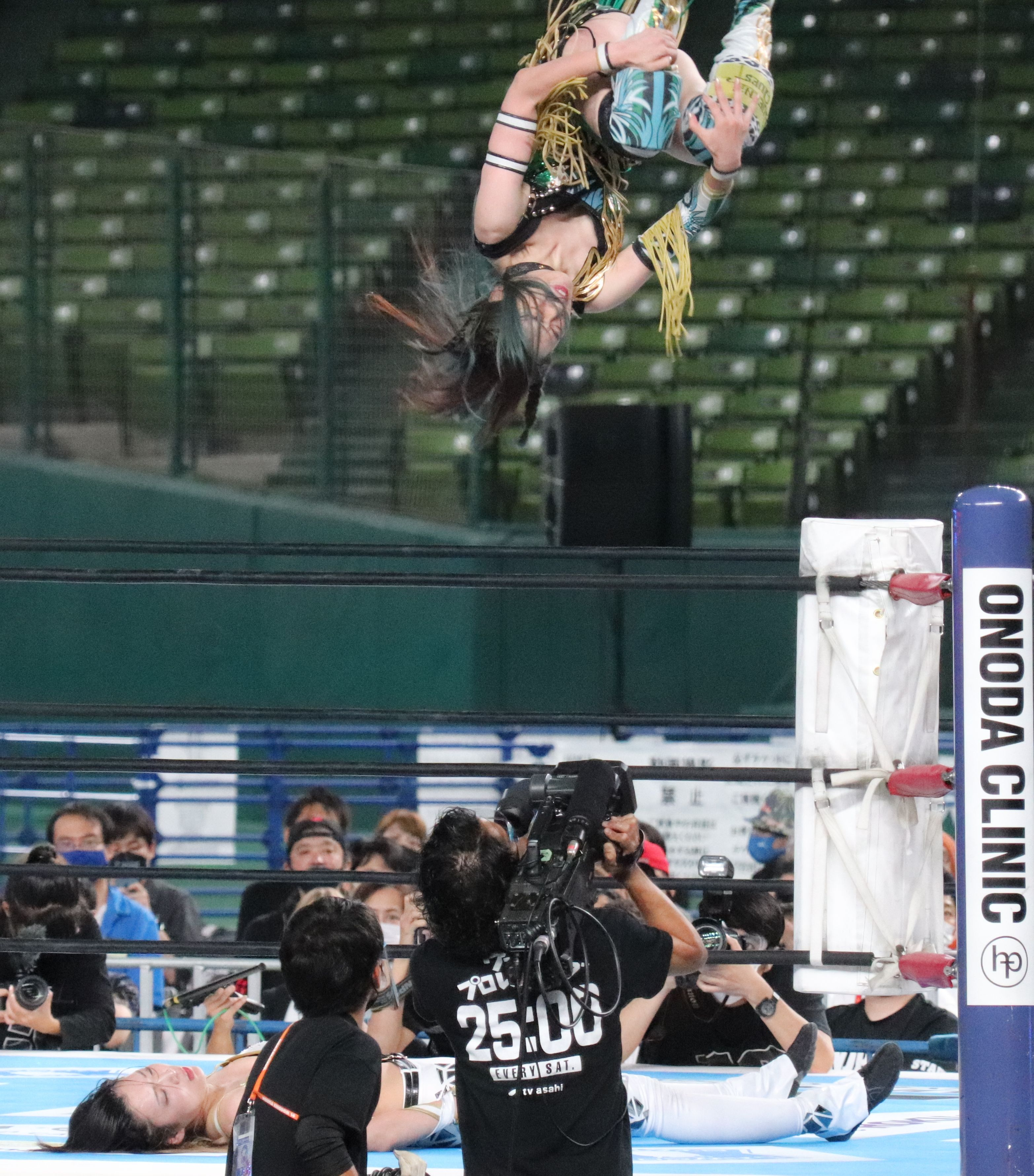
Saya Kamitani (higher) performing a Phoenix splash on Lady C at Wrestle Grand Slam in MetLife Dome on September 4, 2021.

Starting with 2020, Stardom began organizing exhibition matches as part of various events promoted by New Japan Pro Wrestling in order for female talent to be promoted in men's federations. The bouts are preponderantly scripted as tag team matches in which Stardom's wrestlers (who compete as part of certain stables) are usually shuffled. NJPW and Stardom held their first co-promoted event on November 20, 2022. As of November 2, 2026, Stardom has held a total of fifteen matches in eleven different NJPW pay-per-views.

NJPW-only promoted events
| Event | Date | Location | Venue | Match | Ref |
|---|---|---|---|---|---|
| Wrestle Kingdom 14 | January 4, 2020 | Tokyo, Japan | Tokyo Dome | Stars (Mayu Iwatani and Arisa Hoshiki) vs. Hana Kimura and Giulia | |
| Wrestle Kingdom 15 | January 5, 2021 | Tokyo, Japan | Tokyo Dome | Queen's Quest (AZM, Saya Kamitani, and Utami Hayashishita) vs. Donna Del Mondo (Himeka, Maika and Natsupoi) | |
| Wrestle Kingdom 15 | January 5, 2021 | Tokyo, Japan | Tokyo Dome | Donna Del Mondo (Syuri and Giulia) vs. Mayu Iwatani and Tam Nakano | |
| Wrestle Grand Slam in MetLife Dome | September 4, 2021 | Tokorozawa, Japan | MetLife Dome | Queen's Quest (Saya Kamitani and Momo Watanabe) vs. Lady C and Maika | |
| Wrestle Grand Slam in MetLife Dome | September 5, 2021 | Tokorozawa, Japan | MetLife Dome | Queen's Quest (Saya Kamitani and Momo Watanabe) vs. Donna Del Mondo (Syuri and Giulia) | |
| Wrestle Kingdom 16 | January 5, 2022 | Tokyo, Japan | Tokyo Dome | Tam Nakano and Saya Kamitani vs. Mayu Iwatani and Starlight Kid | |
| Rumble on 44th Street | October 28, 2022 | New York City, New York, United States | Palladium Times Square | Mayu Iwatani (c) vs. KiLynn King for the SWA World Championship | |
| Rumble on 44th Street | October 28, 2022 | New York City, New York, United States | Palladium Times Square | Cosmic Angels (Mina Shirakawa and Waka Tsukiyama) vs. Kylie Rae and Tiara James | |
| Wrestle Kingdom 17 | January 4, 2023 | Tokyo, Japan | Tokyo Dome | Kairi (c) vs. Tam Nakano for the IWGP Women's Championship | |
| Battle in the Valley | February 18, 2023 | San Jose, California, United States | San Jose Civic | Kairi (c) vs. Mercedes Moné for the IWGP Women's Championship | |
| Sakura Genesis | April 8, 2023 | Tokyo, Japan | Ryōgoku Kokugikan | Mercedes Moné (c) vs. AZM vs. Hazuki in a three-way match for the IWGP Women's Championship | |
| Independence Day | July 4, 2023 | Tokyo, Japan | Korakuen Hall | Momo Kohgo and Willow Nightingale vs. Donna Del Mondo (Giulia and Thekla) | |
| Independence Day | July 5, 2023 | Tokyo, Japan | Korakuen Hall | Willow Nightingale (c) vs. Giulia for the Strong Women's Championship | |
| Fighting Spirit Unleashed | October 28, 2023 | Las Vegas, Nevada, United States | Sam's Town Live | Giulia (c) vs. Hyan for the Strong Women's Championship | |
| Lonestar Shootout | November 10, 2023 | Garland, Texas, United States | Curtis Culwell Center | Mayu Iwatani (c) vs. Stephanie Vaquer for the IWGP Women's Championship | |
| Battle in the Valley | January 13, 2024 | San Jose, California, United States | San Jose Civic | Giulia (c) vs. Trish Adora for the Strong Women's Championship | |
| Fantastica Mania | February 17, 2024 | Chiba, Japan | Makuhari Messe International Conference Hall | Starlight Kid and Ruaka vs. La Jarochita and Lluvia | |
| The New Beginning in Sapporo | February 23, 2024 | Sapporo, Japan | Hokkaido Prefectural Sports Center | Mayu Iwatani (c) vs. Mina Shirakawa for the IWGP Women's Championship | |
| Windy City Riot | April 12, 2024 | Chicago, Illinois, United States | Wintrust Arena | Mina Shirakawa and Viva Van vs. Alex Windsor and Trish Adora | |
| Windy City Riot | April 12, 2024 | Chicago, Illinois, United States | Wintrust Arena | Stephanie Vaquer (c) vs. AZM for the Strong Women's Championship | |
| Wrestling World in Taiwan | April 14, 2024 | New Taipei City, Taiwan | Zepp New Taipei | Hanako vs. Starlight Kid | |
| Royal Quest IV | October 20, 2024 | London, England | Crystal Palace National Sports Centre | AZM and Dani Luna vs. Mina Shirakawa and Kanji | |
| Strong Style Evolved | December 15, 2024 | Long Beach, California, United States | Walter Pyramid | Mercedes Moné (c) vs. Hazuki for the Strong Women's Championship | |
| Wrestle Kingdom 19 | January 4, 2025 | Tokyo, Japan | Tokyo Dome | Mayu Iwatani (c) vs. AZM for the IWGP Women's Championship | |
| Windy City Riot | April 11, 2025 | Chicago, Illinois, United States | Wintrust Arena | Mina Shirakawa vs. AZM to determine the #1 contender for the Strong Women's Championship | |
| Wrestling Dontaku | May 4, 2025 | Fukuoka, Japan | Fukuoka Kokusai Center | Fukuoka Triple Crazy (Maika, Hazuki and Koguma) vs. Yuna Mizumori and Star Bomb (Starlight Kid and AZM) | |
| Resurgence | May 9, 2025 | Ontario, California, United States | Toyota Arena | Mercedes Moné (c) vs. AZM vs. Mina Shirakawa for the Strong Women's Championship | |
| King of Pro-Wrestling | October 13, 2025 | Tokyo, Japan | Ryōgoku Kokugikan | Sareee (c) vs. Syuri for the IWGP Women's Championship | |
| Purge Night of Torture | November 19, 2025 | Tokyo, Japan | Korakuen Hall | Saya Kamitani vs. Yujiro Takahashi | |
| Wrestle Kingdom 20 | January 4, 2026 | Tokyo, Japan | Tokyo Dome | Syuri (IWGP) vs. Saya Kamitani (Strong) in a Winner Takes All match for the IWGP Women's Championship and Strong Women's Championship | |
| Bound for Unbound | November 20, 2026 | Tokyo, Japan | Korakuen Hall | Natsupoi and Shingo Takagi vs. Chihiro Hashimoto and Jeff Cobb | |

Co-promoted events
| Event | Date | Location | Venue | Match/Main Event | Ref |
|---|---|---|---|---|---|
| Historic X-Over | November 20, 2022 | Tokyo, Japan | Ariake Arena | Mayu Iwatani vs. Kairi for the inaugural IWGP Women's Championship | |
| Historic X-Over 2 | November 17, 2024 | Osaka, Japan | Osaka Prefectural Gymnasium | Zack Sabre Jr. and Maika vs. El Desperado and Starlight Kid | |
| Wrestle Dynasty | January 5, 2025 | Tokyo, Japan | Tokyo Dome | Willow Nightingale vs. Persephone vs. Athena vs. Momo Watanabe for the International Women’s Cup final | |
| Wrestle Dynasty | January 5, 2025 | Tokyo, Japan | Tokyo Dome | Mercedes Moné (Strong) vs. Mina Shirakawa (British) in a Winner Takes All match for the Strong Women's Championship and the Undisputed British Women's Championship | |
| Historic X-Over in Guangzhou | October 5, 2025 | Guangzhou, China | 66 Livehouse | Cosmic Angels (Natsupoi, Saori Anou, and Sayaka Kurara) vs. H.A.T.E. (Natsuko Tora, Ruaka, and Rina) | |
| Forbidden Door | June 28, 2026 | San Jose, California, United States | SAP Center | Maika vs. Skye Blue | |
| Forbidden Door | June 28, 2026 | San Jose, California, United States | SAP Center | Thekla (c) vs. Starlight Kid for the AEW Women's World Championship | |

=== TNA Wrestling ===
Due to NJPW holding partnerships with Total Nonstop Action Wrestling, Stardom began sending talent to compete in cross-over events starting with 2023.

| Event | Date | Location | Venue | Match | Ref |
|---|---|---|---|---|---|
| Multiverse United 2 | August 20, 2023 | Philadelphia, Pennsylvania, United States | 2300 Arena | Giulia (c) vs. Deonna Purrazzo vs. Gisele Shaw vs. Momo Kohgo for the Strong Women's Championship | |

=== Revolution Pro Wrestling ===
| Event | Date | Location | Venue | Match | Ref |
|---|---|---|---|---|---|
| RevPro 12th Anniversary Show | August 24, 2024 | London, England, United Kingdom | Copper Box Arena | Dani Luna (c) vs. Mina Shirakawa for the Undisputed British Women's Championship | |
| Global Wars UK 2024 | October 19, 2024 | Doncaster, United Kingdom | Doncaster Dome | AZM vs. Kanji | |
| Global Wars UK 2024 | October 19, 2024 | Doncaster, United Kingdom | Doncaster Dome | Mina Shirakawa (c) vs. Lizzy Evo for the Undisputed British Women's Championship | |
| Uprising 2024 | December 21, 2024 | London, England, United Kingdom | York Hall | Mina Shirakawa (c) vs. Dani Luna for the Undisputed British Women's Championship | |

=== Ring of Honor ===
| Event | Date | Location | Venue | Match | Ref |
|---|---|---|---|---|---|
| Supercard of Honor | April 5, 2024 | Philadelphia, Pennsylvania, United States | The Liacouras Center | Mina Shirakawa, Maika, and Mei Seira vs. Saya Kamitani, Tam Nakano, and AZM | |
| ROH x CMLL x Stardom Global Wars | June 10, 2026 | Cincinnati, Ohio, United States | Andrew J. Brady Music Center | Athena (c) vs. Syuri for the ROH Women's World Championship | |
| ROH x CMLL x Stardom Global Wars | June 11, 2026 | Cincinnati, Ohio, United States | Andrew J. Brady Music Center | Syuri vs. Billie Starkz | |
| ROH x CMLL x Stardom Global Wars | June 11, 2026 | Cincinnati, Ohio, United States | Andrew J. Brady Music Center | Maika vs. Diamanté | |

=== All Elite Wrestling ===
| Event | Date | Location | Venue | Match | Ref |
|---|---|---|---|---|---|
| Forbidden Door | June 30, 2024 | Elmont, New York, United States | UBS Arena | Willow Nightingale and Tam Nakano vs. Kris Statlander and Momo Watanabe | |
| Forbidden Door | June 30, 2024 | Elmont, New York, United States | UBS Arena | "Timeless" Toni Storm (c) vs. Mina Shirakawa for the AEW Women's World Championship | |
| Revolution | March 9, 2025 | Los Angeles, California, United States | Crypto.com Arena | Mercedes Moné (c) vs. Momo Watanabe for the AEW TBS Championship | |
| All In | July 12, 2025 | Arlington, Texas, United States | Globe Life Field | Syuri wrestled in the Women's Casino Gauntlet match for a future AEW Women's World Championship match | |

=== Consejo Mundial de Lucha Libre ===
| Event | Date | Location | Venue | Match | Ref |
|---|---|---|---|---|---|
| Lucha Kingdom | November 16, 2026 | Mexico City, Mexico | Arena México | Syuri (c) vs. Kira for the IWGP Women's Championship | |

=== Hana Kimura Matane events ===
The Hana Kimura memorial shows are independent events produced annually by Kyoko Kimura to commemorate the death of her late daughter Hana who committed suicide on May 23, 2020. Various wrestlers from Stardom take part in these events, especially former members of Tokyo Cyber Squad or Oedo Tai, two of the units Kimura lead in the past.

| Event | Date | Location | Venue | Match | Ref |
|---|---|---|---|---|---|
| Hana Kimura Memorial Show 1 | May 23, 2021 | Tokyo, Japan | Korakuen Hall | Asuka, Syuri, Natsupoi, and Mio Momono vs. Oedo Tai (Kagetsu and Hazuki) and Tokyo Cyber Squad (Konami and Death Yama-san) | |
| Hana Kimura Memorial Show 2 | May 23, 2022 | Tokyo, Japan | Korakuen Hall | Rina vs. Sakura Hirota | |
| Hana Kimura Memorial Show 2 | May 23, 2022 | Tokyo, Japan | Korakuen Hall | Syuri vs. Asuka | |
| Hana Kimura Memorial Show 3 | May 23, 2023 | Tokyo, Japan | Korakuen Hall | Asuka, Syuri and Natsupoi vs. Kaori Yoneyama, Konami and Rina | |
| Hana Kimura Memorial Show 4 | May 23, 2024 | Tokyo, Japan | Korakuen Hall | God's Eye (Syuri and Konami) and Saori Anou vs. Mika Iwata, Chihiro Hashimoto and Miyuki Takase vs. Kaori Yoneyama, Sareee and Mio Momono | |
| Hana Kimura Memorial Show 4 | May 23, 2024 | Tokyo, Japan | Korakuen Hall | Rina vs. Yuna | |
| Hana Kimura Memorial Show 5 | May 23, 2025 | Tokyo, Japan | Korakuen Hall | Red Energy (Miyuki Takase and Mika Iwata) vs. Sareee and Natsupoi vs. Reiwa Ultima Powers (Dash Chisako and Hiroyo Matsumoto) | |
| Hana Kimura Memorial Show 5 | May 23, 2025 | Tokyo, Japan | Korakuen Hall | Rina vs. Veny | |
| Hana Kimura Memorial Show 6 | May 23, 2026 | Tokyo, Japan | Korakuen Hall | H.A.T.E. (Konami and Rina) and Veny vs. Jungle Kyona, Mika Iwata and Mio Momono | |

=== United Japan Pro-wrestling events ===
The United Japan Pro-wrestling is a wrestling association formed in December 2023 which includes several wrestling promotions in Japan. Members of the UJP wrestling association are New Japan Pro-Wrestling, All Japan Pro Wrestling, Pro Wrestling Noah, World Wonder Ring Stardom, DDT Pro-Wrestling, Tokyo Joshi Pro-Wrestling, Big Japan Pro Wrestling and Ganbare☆Pro-Wrestling.

| Event | Date | Location | Venue | Match | Ref |
|---|---|---|---|---|---|
| All Together | May 6, 2024 | Tokyo, Japan | Nippon Budokan | Mutual Love (Natsupoi and Starlight Kid) vs. 02line (AZM and Miyu Amasaki) | |
| All Together | June 15, 2024 | Sapporo, Hokkaido, Japan | Hokkaido Prefectural Sports Center | AZM vs. Starlight Kid | |

== See also ==
- List of World Wonder Ring Stardom personnel
