= Stardom Sunshine 2023 =

2023 World Wonder Ring Stardom event

- Promotional poster of the event featuring Mayu Iwatani, Giulia, Utami Hayashishita, Natsuko Tora, Saya Kamitani and Momo Watanabe
- Promotion: World Wonder Ring Stardom
- Date: June 25, 2023
- City: Tokyo, Japan
- Venue: Yoyogi National Gymnasium
- Attendance: 1,715

Event chronology
← Previous; New Blood 9	Next → Mid Summer Champions

Stardom Sunshine 2023 (スターダムサンシャイン2023, Sutādamusanshain 2023) was a professional wrestling event promoted by World Wonder Ring Stardom. The event took place on June 25, 2023, in Tokyo, Japan, at the Yoyogi National Gymnasium.

Seven matches were contested at the event, including two on the pre-show, and two of Stardom's nine championships were on the line. The main event saw Queen's Quest (Lady C, Hina, AphrOditE (Utami Hayashishita and Saya Kamitani) and 02line (AZM and Miyu Amasaki)) defeat Oedo Tai (Gold Ship (Natsuko Tora, Saki Kashima and Momo Watanabe) and YoungOED (Starlight Kid, Ruaka and Rina)) in a Loser leaves unit cage match, resulting in Kashima leaving Oedo Tai.

== Production ==
=== Background ===
The show featured seven professional wrestling matches that result from scripted storylines, where wrestlers portray villains, heroes, or less distinguishable characters in the scripted events that build tension and culminate in a wrestling match or series of matches. The event's press conference took place on June 6, 2023, and was broadcast live on Stardom's YouTube channel.

=== Event ===
The preshow included two matches which were broadcast live on Stardom's YouTube channel. In the first one, Momo Kohgo, Hanan and Saya Iida picked up a victory over Waka Tsukiyama, Yuna Mizumori and Sakura Aya. In the second one, 7Upp's Nanae Takahashi defeated Hanako in her "passion injection" match series. The first main card bout saw God's Eye leader Syuri picking up a victory over Xena in singles competition. In the fourth match, World and Wonder of Stardom Champion Tam Nakano, Kairi and Natsupoi picked up a victory over Maika, Suzu Suzuki and Mei Seira in six-woman tag team competition. Next up, Mina Shirakawa and Mariah May defeated Ami Sourei and Mirai to win the Goddesses of Stardom Championship, ending the champion team's reign on their third defense. In the semi main event, Giulia, Thekla and Mai Sakurai defeated IWGP Women's Champion Mayu Iwatani, Hazuki and Koguma in a steel cage match to secure the first defense of the Artist of Stardom Championship in that respective reign. After the bout concluded, Giulia challenged Strong Women's Champion Willow Nightingale for the title on further notice.

In the main event, Queen's Quest defeated Oedo Tai in a Loser leaves unit cage match. Saya Kamitani and Utami Hayashishita won the match by simultaneously escaping the cage. High Speed Champion Saki Kashima was the one to remain inside the cage, therefore she attracted the defeat for Oedo Tai. The rest of the unit members attacked Kashima after the loss, but Queen's Quest briefly saved her as they sent the latter unit off the ring. AZM offered Kashima a spot into the unit but the latter refused. At the end of the show, Hayashishita and the rest of Queen's Quest stood tall inside the ring, declaring the end of the intern tensions between members which occurred since a few weeks before the show.

== Results ==
No.	Results	Stipulations	Times
1^{P}	Stars (Momo Kohgo and wing★gori (Hanan and Saya Iida)) defeated Waka Tsukiyama, Yuna Mizumori and Aya Sakura	Six-woman tag team match	7:13
2^{P}	Nanae Takahashi defeated Hanako	Passion injection match	11:59
3	Syuri defeated Xena	Singles match	7:50
4	meltear (Tam Nakano and Natsupoi) and Kairi defeated Maika, Suzu Suzuki and Mei Seira	Six-woman tag team match	14:41
5	Rose Gold (Mina Shirakawa and Mariah May) defeated The New Eras (Ami Sourei and Mirai) (c)	Tag team match for the Goddesses of Stardom Championship	16:04
6	Baribari Bombers (Giulia, Thekla and Mai Sakurai) (c) defeated Stars (Mayu Iwatani and FWC (Hazuki and Koguma))	Six-woman tag team steel cage match for the Artist of Stardom Championship	16:47
7	Queen's Quest (Lady C, Hina, AphrOditE (Utami Hayashishita and Saya Kamitani) and 02line (AZM and Miyu Amasaki)) defeated Oedo Tai (Gold Ship (Natsuko Tora, Saki Kashima and Momo Watanabe) and YoungOED (Starlight Kid, Ruaka and Rina))	Loser leaves unit steel cage match Since Saki Kashima was the losing wrestler, she was forced to leave Oedo Tai.	23:23
(c) / – the champion(s) heading into the match; P / – the match was broadcast on the pre-show
