= Stardom Mid Summer Champions 2023 =

2023 World Wonder Ring Stardom event

- Promotional art work of the event
- Promotion: World Wonder Ring Stardom
- Date: July 2, 2023
- City: Yokohama, Japan
- Venue: Yokohama Budokan
- Attendance: 1,307

Event chronology
← Previous; Sunshine 2023	Next → 5 Star Grand Prix 2023

Mid Summer Champions chronology
← Previous; 2022	Next → —

Stardom Mid Summer Champions 2023 (スターダム真夏のチャンピオン2023, Sutādamu manatsu no chanpion 2023) was a professional wrestling event promoted by World Wonder Ring Stardom. The event took place on July 2, 2023, in Yokohama, Japan, at the Yokohama Budokan.

Nine matches were contested at the event, including two on the pre-show, and three of Stardom's nine championships were on the line. The main event saw Saori Anou defeat Natsupoi in an Indian Strap match. In other prominent matches, Mirai defeated Tam Nakano to win the Wonder of Stardom Championship, and Rose Gold (Mina Shirakawa and Mariah May) defeated Abarenbo GE (Syuri and Ami Sourei) to retain the Goddesses of Stardom Championship.

== Production ==
=== Background ===
The show featured nine professional wrestling matches that result from scripted storylines, where wrestlers portray villains, heroes, or less distinguishable characters in the scripted events that build tension and culminate in a wrestling match or series of matches. The event's press conference took place on June 6, 2023, and was broadcast live on Stardom's YouTube channel.

=== Event ===
The first two preshow matches were broadcast on Stardom's YouTube channel. In the first one, Waka Tsukiyama and Yuna Mizumori picked up a victory over Miyu Amasaki and Hina. In the second one, Suzu Suzuki, Mei Seira and Hanako picked up a win over Hazuki, Saya Iida and Sakura Aya in six-woman tag team action. In the first main card bout, Utami Hayashishita and Saya Kamitani, AZM and Lady C defeated Koguma, Mayu Iwatani, Hanan and Momo Kohgo. After the bout concluded, Hayashishita declared she would take some time off the leader spot of Queen's Quest in order to reconsider herself while worrying about her leadership skills, giving the events from the previous months. Next up, the Artist of Stardom Champions Giulia, Thekla and Mai Sakurai alongside Maika defeated Natsuko Tora, Momo Watanabe and Ruaka and Rina. In the fifth match, Nanae Takahashi defeated Starlight Kid in the "passion injection" match series. Next up, Mina Shirakawa and Mariah May defeated Syuri and Ami Sourei to secure the first defense of the Goddesses of Stardom Championship in that respective reign. In the seventh bout, Saki Kashima successfully defended the High Speed Championship against Fukigen Death for the first time in that respective reign. After the bout concluded, Kashima's former Oedo Tai stablemates attacked her, following the events from Sunshine, where Kashima fell victim to a "loser leaves unit match". Syuri and Ami Sourei came out to rescue Kashima as they recruited her into God's Eye. In the semi main event, Mirai defeated World of Stardom Champion Tam Nakano to win the Wonder of Stardom Championship, successfully fulfilling her Cinderella wish granted after winning the namesake tournament of 2023.

In the main event, Saori Anou defeated Cosmic Angels stablemate Natsupoi in a Strap match, concluding grudges both of them held against each other. Yuna Mizumori joined the stable after the bout concluded, as all four of Tam Nakano, Natsupoi, Anou and herself closed the show after Anou performed her first stable dance.

== Results ==
No.	Results	Stipulations	Times
1^{P}	Waka Tsukiyama and Yuna Mizumori defeated Queen's Quest (Miyu Amasaki and Hina)	Tag team match	5:38
2^{P}	Suzu Suzuki, Mei Seira and Hanako defeated Classmates (Hazuki and Saya Iida) and Aya Sakura	Six-woman tag team match	11:31
3	Queen's Quest (AphrOditE (Utami Hayashishita and Saya Kamitani), AZM and Lady C) defeated Stars (Koguma and H&Ms (Mayu Iwatani, Hanan and Momo Kohgo))	Eight-woman tag team match	9:21
4	Donna Del Mondo (Giulia, Thekla, Mai Sakurai and Maika) defeated Oedo Tai (Natsuko Tora, Momo Watanabe and YoungOED (Ruaka and Rina))	Eight-woman tag team match	12:18
5	Nanae Takahashi defeated Starlight Kid (with Momoe Nakanishi)	Passion injection match	14:28
6	Saki Kashima (c) defeated Fukigen Death	Singles match for the High Speed Championship	3:30
7	Rose Gold (Mina Shirakawa and Mariah May) (c) defeated Abarenbo GE (Syuri and Ami Sourei)	Tag team match for the Goddesses of Stardom Championship	14:45
8	Mirai defeated Tam Nakano (c)	Singles match for the Wonder of Stardom Championship	22:16
9	Saori Anou defeated Natsupoi	Indian Strap match	26:36
(c) / – the champion(s) heading into the match; P / – the match was broadcast on the pre-show
