= Stardom New Blood 14 =

2024 World Wonder Ring Stardom event

New Blood 14
- Promotion: World Wonder Ring Stardom
- Date: September 13, 2024
- City: Nagoya, Japan
- Venue: Chunichi Hall
- Attendance: 326

Event chronology
← Previous; 5 Star Grand Prix 2024	Next → Namba Grand Fight

New Blood chronology
← Previous; New Blood 13	Next → New Blood 15

Stardom New Blood 14 (スターダム ニュー ブラッド 14, Sutādamu nyū Buraddo 14) was a professional wrestling event promoted by World Wonder Ring Stardom. The event took place on September 13, 2024, in Nagoya, Japan, at the Chunichi Hall.

Five matches were contested at the event, including one on the pre-show. The main event saw Devil Princess (Rina and Azusa Inaba) defeat PikaSaku (Aya Sakura and Yuna Mizumori).

== Production ==
=== Background ===
"New Blood" is a series of events that mainly focus on matches where rookie wrestlers, usually with three or fewer years of in-ring experience, evolve. Besides wrestlers from Stardom, various superstars from multiple promotions of the Japanese independent scene are invited to compete in bouts that are usually going under the stipulation of singles or tag team matches.

The show featured five professional wrestling matches that result from scripted storylines, where wrestlers portray villains, heroes, or less distinguishable characters in the scripted events that build tension and culminate in a wrestling match or series of matches.

=== Event ===
The event started with a preshow bout broadcast live on Stardom's YouTube channel, in which Maika and Rian picked up a victory over Tam Nakano and Kurara Sayaka ahead of Maika and Nakano's clash for the latter's World of Stardom Championship which occurred one night later at Stardom Namba Grand Fight.

In the main card bout, Konami defeated Ranna Yagami in singles competition. Next up, Waka Tsukiyama and Hanako outmatched Hanan and Saya Iida in tag team action. The fourth bout saw Hina and Tomoka Inaba picking up a victory over Miyu Amasaki and Starlight Kid in tag team competition. In the main event, New Blood Tag Team Champions Azusa Inaba and Future of Stardom Champion Rina defeated Aya Sakura and Yuna Mizumori in a non-title bout.

== Results ==
No.	Results	Stipulations	Times
1^{P}	Maika and Rian defeated Cosmic Angels (Tam Nakano and Sayaka Kurara)	Tag team match	13:28
2	Konami defeated Ranna Yagami	Singles match	10:51
3	Empress Nexus Venus (Waka Tsukiyama and Hanako) defeated wing★gori (Hanan and Saya Iida)	Tag team match	14:14
4	Hinaba (Hina and Tomoka Inaba) defeated Neo Genesis (Miyu Amasaki and Starlight Kid)	Tag team match	12:28
5	Devil Princess (Rina and Azusa Inaba) defeated PikaSaku (Aya Sakura and Yuna Mizumori)	Tag team match	18:04
P / – the match was broadcast on the pre-show
