= Stardom New Blood 16 =

2024 World Wonder Ring Stardom event

New Blood 16
- Promotion: World Wonder Ring Stardom
- Date: October 19, 2024
- City: Tokyo, Japan
- Venue: Belle Salle Takadanobaba
- Attendance: 236

Event chronology
← Previous; Nagoya Golden Fight	Next → 2024 Goddesses of Stardom Tag League

New Blood chronology
← Previous; New Blood 15	Next → New Blood West 2

Stardom New Blood 16 (スターダム ニュー ブラッド 16, Sutādamu nyū Buraddo 16) was a professional wrestling event promoted by World Wonder Ring Stardom. The event took place on October 19, 2024, in Tokyo, Japan at the Belle Salle Takadanobaba.

Five matches were contested at the event. The main event saw Devil Princess (Rina and Azusa Inaba) defeat Empress Nexus Venus (Waka Tsukiyama and Hanako) to retain the New Blood Tag Team Championship

== Production ==
=== Background ===
"New Blood" is a series of events that mainly focus on matches where rookie wrestlers, usually with three or fewer years of in-ring experience, evolve. Besides wrestlers from Stardom, various superstars from multiple promotions of the Japanese independent scene are invited to compete in bouts that are usually going under the stipulation of singles or tag team matches.

The show featured professional wrestling matches that result from scripted storylines, where wrestlers portray villains, heroes, or less distinguishable characters in the scripted events that build tension and culminate in a wrestling match or series of matches.

=== Event ===
The entire event was broadcast live on Stardom's YouTube channel. In the first bout, Sendai Girls' Pro Wrestling's Manami picked up a victory over Rian in singles competition. In the second bout, Lady C and Ranna Yagami defeated Kurara Sayaka and Aya Sakura in tag team competition. Next up, Starlight Kid and Future of Stardom Champion Miyu Amasaki outmatched Sendai Girls' Pro Wrestling's Yuna and freelancer Spike Nishimura in tag team action. The semi main event saw Hina and Tomoka Inaba defeating Pro Wrestling Wave's Honoka and Kohaku.

In the main event, Rina and Azusa Inaba defeated Waka Tsukiyama and Hanako to secure the first defense of the New Blood Tag Team Championship in that respective reign. After the bout concluded, Rina and Inaba received a title challenge from Lady C and Ranna Yagami.

== Results ==
No.	Results	Stipulations	Times
1	Manami defeated Rian	Singles match	9:06
2	God's Eye (Lady C and Ranna Yagami) defeated Cosmic Angels (Sayaka Kurara and Aya Sakura)	Tag team match	13:15
3	Neo Genesis (Starlight Kid and Miyu Amasaki) defeated Yuna and Spike Nishimura	Tag team match	11:49
4	God's Eye (Hina and Tomoka Inaba) defeated Honoka and Kohaku	Tag team match	10:36
5	Devil Princess (Rina and Azusa Inaba) (c) defeated Rice Or Bread (Waka Tsukiyama and Hanako)	Tag team match for the New Blood Tag Team Championship	18:15
(c) / – the champion(s) heading into the match
