= Stardom New Blood 9 =

2023 World Wonder Ring Stardom event

New Blood 9
- Promotion: World Wonder Ring Stardom
- Date: June 2, 2023
- City: Tokyo, Japan
- Venue: Shinagawa Intercity Hall
- Attendance: 306

Event chronology
← Previous; Flashing Champions	Next → Sunshine 2023

New Blood chronology
← Previous; New Blood 8	Next → New Blood 10

Stardom New Blood 9 (スターダムニューブラッド9, Sutādamunyūburaddo 9) was a professional wrestling event promoted by World Wonder Ring Stardom. The event took place on June 2, 2023, in Tokyo, Japan, at the Shinagawa Intercity Hall.

Seven matches were contested at the event. The main event saw Rina defeat Lady C to retain the Future of Stardom Championship.

== Production ==
=== Background ===
"New Blood" is a series of events that mainly focus on matches where rookie wrestlers, usually with three or fewer years of in-ring experience, evolve. Besides wrestlers from Stardom, various superstars from multiple promotions of the Japanese independent scene are invited to compete in bouts that are usually going under the stipulation of singles or tag team matches.

The show featured seven professional wrestling matches that result from scripted storylines, where wrestlers portray villains, heroes, or less distinguishable characters in the scripted events that build tension and culminate in a wrestling match or series of matches. The event's press conference took place on May 15, 2023, and was broadcast on Stardom's YouTube channel.

=== Event ===
The entire show was broadcast live on Stardom's YouTube channel. In the first bout, Goddesses of Stardom Champions Ami Sourei and Mirai picked up a victory over rookies Sakura Aya and Hanako. In the second one, Hanan and Saya Iida picked up a victory over Oedo Tai's Ruaka and Pro Wrestling Wave's Kohaku. Next up, Ram Kaicho and Maika Ozaki defeated Sexy Dynamite Princess and Waka Tsukiyama. Next up, Nanae Takahashi defeated one third of the Artist of Stardom Champions Mai Sakurai in her series of "passion injection" matches in which she punished younger talent for directly disrespecting her or not treating their wrestling career properly. The fifth bout saw Queen's Quest's stablemates AZM and Miyu Amasaki colliding in the latter's rookie series match, solded with the victory of AZM. In the semi main event, Starlight Kid and Karma defeated Professional Wrestling Just Tap Out's Tomoka Inaba and Azusa Inaba to secure the second consecutive defense of the New Blood Tag Team Championship in that respective reign. After the bout concluded, they received a challenge from the teams of 02line (AZM and Miyu Amasaki), and wing★gori (Hanan and Saya Iida), shaping up a three-way tag team match for the titles on further notice.

In the main event, Rina defeated Lady C to secure her first defense of the Future of Stardom Championship in that respective reign. After the bout concluded, she received a challenge from Waka Tsukiyama.

== Results ==
No.	Results	Stipulations	Times
1	The New Eras (Ami Sourei and Mirai) defeated Aya Sakura and Hanako	Tag team match	11:43
2	wing★gori (Hanan and Saya Iida) defeated Kohaku and Ruaka	Tag team match	11:20
3	Rebel&Enemy (Ram Kaicho and Maika Ozaki) defeated Club Venus (Sexy Dynamite Princess and Waka Tsukiyama)	Tag team match	10:55
4	Nanae Takahashi defeated Mai Sakurai	Passion injection match	14:21
5	AZM defeated Miyu Amasaki	Singles match (Note: This was the last match of Amasaki's "Triumph series" of bouts she underwent beginning with her first rookie year.)	13:46
6	Bloody Fate (Karma and Starlight Kid) (c) defeated Tomoka Inaba and Azusa Inaba	Tag team match for the New Blood Tag Team Championship	13:41
7	Rina (c) defeated Lady C	Singles match for the Future of Stardom Championship	11:52
(c) / – the champion(s) heading into the match
