= Stardom Nagoya Golden Fight 2024 =

2024 World Wonder Ring Stardom event

- Promotional poster of the event
- Promotion: World Wonder Ring Stardom
- Date: October 5, 2024
- City: Nagoya, Japan
- Venue: Aichi Prefectural Gymnasium
- Attendance: 1,526

Event chronology
| ← Previous; New Blood 15 | Next → New Blood 16 |

Nagoya Golden Fight chronology
| ← Previous; 2023 | Next → — |

Stardom Nagoya Golden Fight 2024 (スターダム名古屋ゴールデンファイト2024, Sutādamu Nagoya gōrudenfaito 2024) was a professional wrestling event promoted by World Wonder Ring Stardom. The event took place on October 5, 2024, in Osaka at Aichi Prefectural Gymnasium.

Nine matches were contested at the event, including four on the pre-show, and four of Stardom's ten championships were on the line. The main event saw Tam Nakano defeat Suzu Suzuki to retain the Wonder of Stardom Championship. In other prominent matches, Mayu Iwatani successfully retained the IWGP Women's Championship against All Elite Wrestling's "Timeless" Toni Storm, and Natsupoi defeated Thekla to retain the Wonder of Stardom Championship.

== Production ==
=== Background ===
The show featured professional wrestling matches that result from scripted storylines, where wrestlers portray villains, heroes, or less distinguishable characters in the scripted events that build tension and culminate in a wrestling match or series of matches.

=== Event ===
The event started with four preshow confrontations which were broadcast live on Stardom's YouTube channel. In the first one, Yuna Mizumori defeated Koguma, Hina, Momo Kohgo and Ranna Yagami in a Battle royal match to become the number one contender for the High Speed Championship. In the second one, Miyu Amasaki defeated Rina to win the Future of Stardom Championship, ending the latter's reign at 512 days and 12 defenses which was an all-time record at the time. In the third one, Saya Kamitani defeated Kurara Sayaka in singles competition. In the fourth bout, (Natsuko Tora, Momo Watanabe, Konami and Ruaka of H.A.T.E. teamed up with legends ZAP and Dump Matsumoto to defeat Maika, Mina Shirakawa, Xena, Waka Tsukiyama, Hanako and Rian. New Japan Pro Wrestling's Great-O-Khan made an appearance and laid an open challenge for his KOPW Championship to any female wrestler in Stardom for Historic X-Over 2.

In the first main card bout, Starlight Kid picked up a win over Hazuki. After the match ended with a quick pin, Hazuki took of Kid's mask, without revealing the latter's face, hinting the continuation of their feud. Next up, Syuri and Lady C picked up a victory over the teams of AZM and Mei Seira, Saori Anou and Aya Sakura, and Hanan and Saya Iida in a Four-way tag team match. In the seventh bout, Natsupoi defeated one half of the oddess of Stardom Champions Thekla to secure the second consecutive defense of the Wonder of Stardom Championship in that respective reign. In the semi main event, Mayu Iwatani defeated All Elite Wrestling's "Timeless" Toni Storm to secure the seventh consecutive defense of the IWGP Women's Championship in that respective reign.

In the main event, Tam Nakano defeated Suzu Suzuki to secure the second consecutive defense of the World of Stardom Championship in that respective reign.

== Results ==
| No. | Results | Stipulations | Times |
|---|---|---|---|
| 1^{P} | Yuna Mizumori defeated Koguma, Hina, Momo Kohgo and Ranna Yagami by pinfall | Battle royal match to determinate the #1 contender for the High Speed Championship | 8:47 |
| 2^{P} | Miyu Amasaki defeated Rina (c) by pinfall | Singles match for the Future of Stardom Championship | 14:03 |
| 3^{P} | Saya Kamitani defeated Sayaka Kurara by pinfall | Singles match | 12:45 |
| 4^{P} | H.A.T.E. (Natsuko Tora, Momo Watanabe, Konami and Ruaka) and Vulgar Alliance (ZAP and Dump Matsumoto) defeated Empress Nexus Venus (Maika, Mina Shirakawa, Xena, Waka Tsukiyama, Hanako and Rian) by pinfall | Twelve-woman tag team match | 9:10 |
| 5 | Starlight Kid defeated Hazuki by pinfall | Singles match | 19:19 |
| 6 | God's Eye (Syuri and Lady C) defeated Neo Genesis (AZM and Mei Seira), Cosmic Angels (Saori Anou and Aya Sakura) and wing★gori (Hanan and Saya Iida) by pinfall | Four-way tag team match | 9:55 |
| 7 | Natsupoi (c) defeated Thekla by pinfall | Singles match for the Wonder of Stardom Championship | 19:57 |
| 8 | Mayu Iwatani (c) defeated "Timeless" Toni Storm by pinfall | Singles match for the IWGP Women's Championship | 18:37 |
| 9 | Tam Nakano (c) defeated Suzu Suzuki by pinfall | Singles match for the World of Stardom Championship | 23:00 |
(c) / – the champion(s) heading into the match; P / – the match was broadcast on the pre-show
