= Stardom New Blood 15 =

2024 World Wonder Ring Stardom event

New Blood 15
- Promotion: World Wonder Ring Stardom
- Date: September 29, 2024
- City: Tokorozawa, Japan
- Venue: Japan Pavilion Hall A
- Attendance: 326

Event chronology
← Previous; Namba Grand Fight	Next → Nagoya Golden Fight

New Blood chronology
← Previous; New Blood 14	Next → New Blood 16

Stardom New Blood 15 (スターダム ニュー ブラッド 15, Sutādamu nyū Buraddo 15) was a professional wrestling event promoted by World Wonder Ring Stardom. The event took place on September 13, 2024, in Tokorozawa, Japan at the Japan Pavilion Hall A.

Six matches were contested at the event. In the main event, Rina defeated Aya Sakura to retain the Future of Stardom Championship.

== Production ==
=== Background ===
"New Blood" is a series of events that mainly focus on matches where rookie wrestlers, usually with three or fewer years of in-ring experience, evolve. Besides wrestlers from Stardom, various superstars from multiple promotions of the Japanese independent scene are invited to compete in bouts that are usually going under the stipulation of singles or tag team matches.

The show featured professional wrestling matches that result from scripted storylines, where wrestlers portray villains, heroes, or less distinguishable characters in the scripted events that build tension and culminate in a wrestling match or series of matches.

=== Event ===
The entire show was broadcast on Stardom's YouTube channel. In the first bout, Tomoka Inaba picked up a victory over Rian in singles competition. Next up, Kurara Sayaka outmatched Soy in another singles bout. The third match saw Lady C and Ranna Yagami defeating Ruaka and one half of the New Blood Tag Team Champions Azusa Inaba in tag team competition. Next up, Hanako defeated Echika Miyabi in singles action. The semi main event saw Miyu Amasaki defeating Hina.

In the main event, Rina defeated Aya Sakura to secure the twelfth consecutive defense of the Future of Stardom Championship in that respective reign. After the bout concluded, Miyu Amasaki challenged Rina to a title match in a bout which was set to take place at Nagoya Golden Fight on October 5, 2024.

== Results ==
No.	Results	Stipulations	Times
1	Tomoka Inaba defeated Rian by pinfall	Singles match	9:04
2	Sayaka Kurara defeated Soy by pinfall	Singles match	7:26
3	God's Eye (Lady C and Ranna Yagami) defeated H.A.T.E. (Ruaka and Azusa Inaba) by pinfall	Tag team match	10:09
4	Hanako defeated Echika Miyabi by pinfall	Singles match	8:33
5	Miyu Amasaki defeated Hina by pinfall	Singles match	10:25
6	Rina (c) defeated Aya Sakura by pinfall	Singles match for the Future of Stardom Championship	14:37
(c) / – the champion(s) heading into the match
