= Stardom New Blood 8 =

2023 World Wonder Ring Stardom event

New Blood 8
- Promotional art work of the event
- Promotion: World Wonder Ring Stardom
- Date: May 12, 2023
- City: Tokyo, Japan
- Venue: Shinagawa Intercity Hall
- Attendance: 407

Event chronology
← Previous; Fukuoka Goddess Legend	Next → Flashing Champions

New Blood chronology
← Previous; New Blood Premium	Next → New Blood 9

Stardom New Blood 8 (スターダムニューブラッド8, Sutādamunyūburaddo 8) was a professional wrestling event promoted by World Wonder Ring Stardom. The event took place on May 12, 2023, in Tokyo, Japan, at the Shinagawa Intercity Hall.

The event featured eight matches with two of Stardom's nine championships on the line. The main event saw Tam Nakano defeat Nao Ishikawa who cosplayed her. In other prominent matches, Rina defeated Ami Sourei to win the Future of Stardom Championship, and Bloody Fate successfully defended the New Blood Tag Team Championship against Lady C and Hanako.

== Production ==
=== Background ===
"New Blood" is a series of events that mainly focus on matches where rookie wrestlers, usually with three or fewer years of in-ring experience, evolve. Besides wrestlers from Stardom, various superstars from multiple promotions of the Japanese independent scene are invited to compete in bouts that are usually going under the stipulation of singles or tag team matches.

The show featured eight professional wrestling matches that result from scripted storylines, where wrestlers portray villains, heroes, or less distinguishable characters in the scripted events that build tension and culminate in a wrestling match or series of matches. The event's press conference took place on April 25, 2023, and was broadcast on Stardom's YouTube channel.

=== Event ===
The entire show was broadcast live on Stardom's YouTube channel. The event started with the confrontation between Sakura Aya and Club Venus' Waka Tsukiyama solded with the victory of the latter. Next up, Hanan and Hina went into a time-limit draw against JTO's Tomoka Inaba and Azusa Inaba. The third bout saw Suzu Suzuki and Mei Seira picking up a victory over Mai Sakurai and Chanyota. In the fourth match, Miyu Amasaki fell short to Momo Watanabe in one of her final "triumph" series of matches she began in 2022, her first rookie year. Next, 7Upp's Nanae Takahashi picked up a victory over Ruaka. In the sixth bout, Starlight Kid and Karma defeated Lady C and Hanako to secure the first defense of the New Blood Tag Team Championship in that respective reign. After the bout concluded, they received a challenge from Tomoka Inaba and Azusa Inaba. In the semi main event, Rina defeated Ami Sourei to win the Future of Stardom Championship. After the bout concluded, she received a challenge from Lady C.

In the main event, World of Stardom Champion Tam Nakano defeated Nao Ishikawa who cosplayed her in singles competition.

== Results ==
No.	Results	Stipulations	Times
1	Waka Tsukiyama defeated Aya Sakura	Singles match	6:12
2	Hanan and Hina vs. Tomoka Inaba and Azusa Inaba ended in a time-limit draw	Tag team match	15:00
3	Suzu Suzuki and Mei Seira defeated Mai Sakurai and Chanyota	Tag team match	9:00
4	Momo Watanabe defeated Miyu Amasaki	Singles match	11:04
5	Nanae Takahashi defeated Ruaka	Passion injection match	12:05
6	Bloody Fate (Karma and Starlight Kid) (c) defeated Lady C and Hanako	Tag team match for the New Blood Tag Team Championship	16:29
7	Rina defeated Ami Sourei (c)	Singles match for the Future of Stardom Championship	12:29
8	Tam Nakano defeated Nao Ishikawa (Note: Ishikawa cosplayed Nakano ever since the press conference.)	Singles match	14:32
(c) / – the champion(s) heading into the match
