= Stardom Path of Thunder 2025 =

2025 World Wonder Ring Stardom professional wrestling event

- Promotional poster of the event featuring Hina, Hanan and Rina
- Promotion: World Wonder Ring Stardom
- Date: February 24, 2025
- City: Utsunomiya, Japan
- Venue: Light Cube Utsunomiya
- Attendance: 896

Event chronology
| ← Previous; New Blood 18 | Next → New Blood 19 |

Path of Thunder chronology
| ← Previous; First | Next → 2026 |

Stardom Path of Thunder 2025 (スターダム・パス・オブ・サンダー2025, sutadamu pasu obu sandā) was a professional wrestling event promoted by World Wonder Ring Stardom. The event took place on February 24, 2025, in Utsunomiya at the Light Cube Utsunomiya.

Nine matches were contested at the event, and three of Stardom's nine championships were on the line. The main event saw Starlight Kid defeat Rina to retain the Wonder of Stardom Championship. In another prominent match, Hina defeated Miyu Amasaki to win the Future of Stardom Championship.

== Production ==
=== Background ===
The show featured professional wrestling matches that result from scripted storylines, where wrestlers portrayed villains, heroes, or less distinguishable characters in the scripted events that built tension and culminated in a wrestling match or series of matches.

=== Event ===
The event started with the singles confrontation between Yuria Hime and Mayu Iwatani solded with the victory of the latter. Next up, Saki Kashima, Lady C, Ranna Yagami and Tomoka Inaba picked up a victory over Natsupoi, Saori Anou, Yuna Mizumori and Aya Sakura in an eight-woman tag team bout. The third bout saw AZM outmatching Waka Tsukiyama, Akira Kurogane and Fukigen Death in four-way competition. In the fourth match, Maika, Hanako and Rian defeated the teams of Hazuki, Koguma and Momo Kohgo, and Momo Watanabe, Thekla and Ruaka in three-way tag team competition. Next up, Konami and Azusa Inaba defeated Syuri and Kiyoka Kotatsu in tag team competition. The sixth bout saw Tam Nakano and Sayaka Kurara picking up a victory over World of Stardom Champion Saya Kamitani and Natsuko Tora in tag team competition. The stipulation of the bout was that if the H.A.T.E. members won, Sayaka Kurara would have had to join the latter unit, as Kamitani teased both her and Nakano with recruiting her into H.A.T.E. for several weeks prior to the event. Since Nakano and Sayaka won, Kamitani granted Nakano a wish which was later confirmed to be a loser leaves Stardom match established to occur on March 3, 2025. In the seventh bout, Hina defeated Miyu Amasaki to win the Future of Stardom Championship, ending the latter's reign at 142 days and three defenses. In the semi main event, Hanan and Saya Iida defeated Mei Seira and Suzu Suzuki to secure the first successful defense of the Goddesses of Stardom Championship in that respective reign.

In the main event, Starlight Kid defeated Rina to secure the first successful defense of the Wonder of Stardom Championship in that respective reign.

== Results ==
| No. | Results | Stipulations | Times |
|---|---|---|---|
| 1 | Mayu Iwatani defeated Yuria Hime | Singles match | 9:26 |
| 2 | God's Eye (Saki Kashima, Lady C, Ranna Yagami and Tomoka Inaba) defeated Cosmic Angels (Natsupoi, Saori Anou, Yuna Mizumori and Aya Sakura) | Eight-woman tag team match | 9:04 |
| 3 | AZM defeated Waka Tsukiyama, Akira Kurogane and Fukigen Death | Four-way match | 6:14 |
| 4 | Empress Nexus Venus (Maika, Hanako and Rian) defeated Stars (Hazuki, Koguma and Momo Kohgo) and H.A.T.E. (Momo Watanabe, Thekla and Ruaka) | Three-way tag team match | 11:25 |
| 5 | H.A.T.E. (Konami and Azusa Inaba) defeated God's Eye (Syuri and Kiyoka Kotatsu) | Tag team match | 10:15 |
| 6 | Cosmic Angels (Tam Nakano and Sayaka Kurara) defeated H.A.T.E. (Saya Kamitani and Natsuko Tora) | Tag team match Since Cosmic Angels won, Kamitani granted Nakano a wish. If H.A.T.E. won, Kurara must have joined the latter unit. | 14:53 |
| 7 | Hina defeated Miyu Amasaki (c) | Singles match for the Future of Stardom Championship | 13:40 |
| 8 | wing★gori (Hanan and Saya Iida) (c) defeated Crazy Star (Mei Seira and Suzu Suzuki) | Tag team match for the Goddesses of Stardom Championship | 17:12 |
| 9 | Starlight Kid (c) defeated Rina | Singles match for the Wonder of Stardom Championship | 23:31 |
(c) / – the champion(s) heading into the match
