= City Hall Plaza Aore Nagaoka =

Sports venue in Nagaoka, Niigata, Japan

Coordinates: 37°26′47″N 138°51′4″E

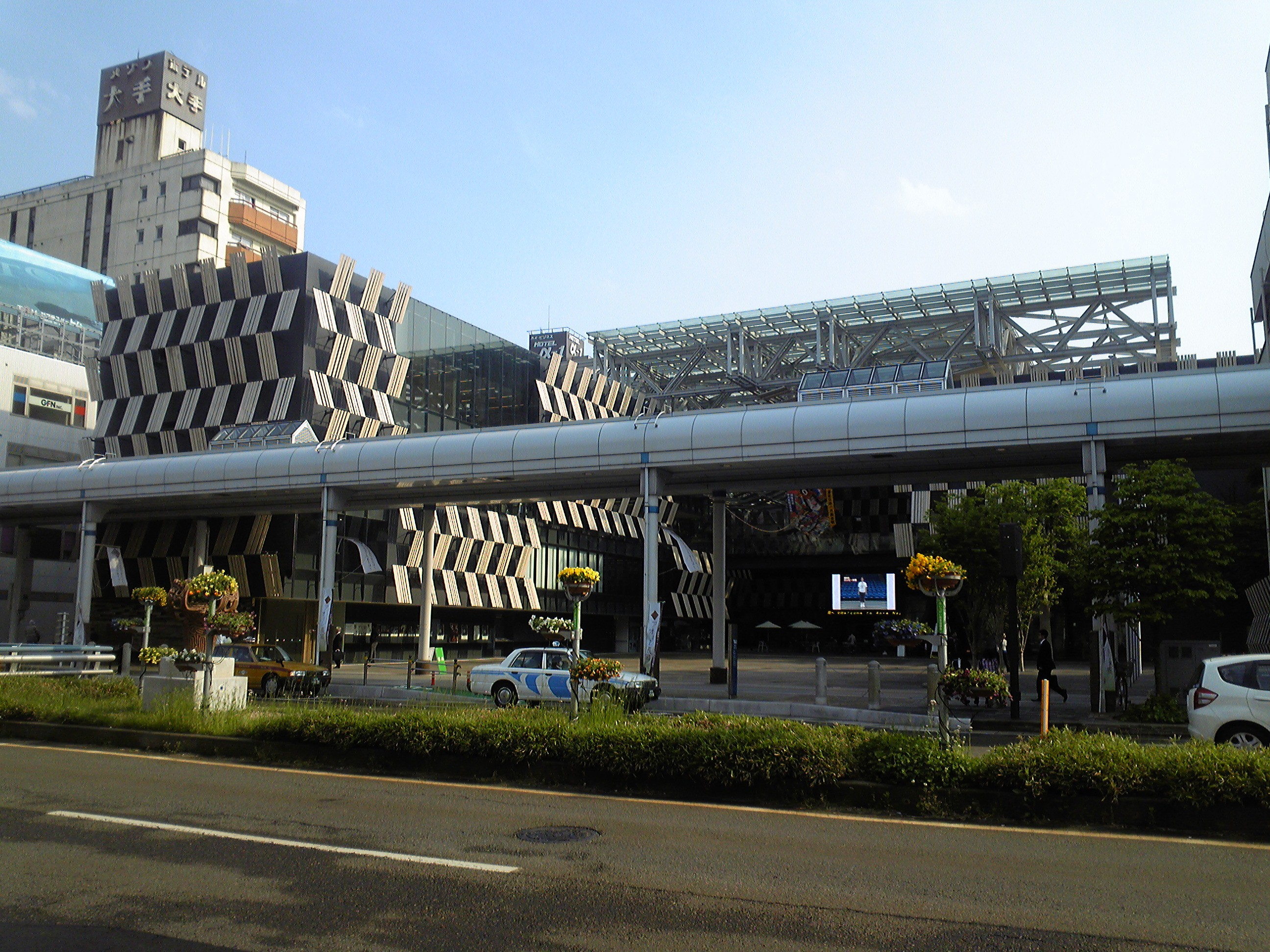
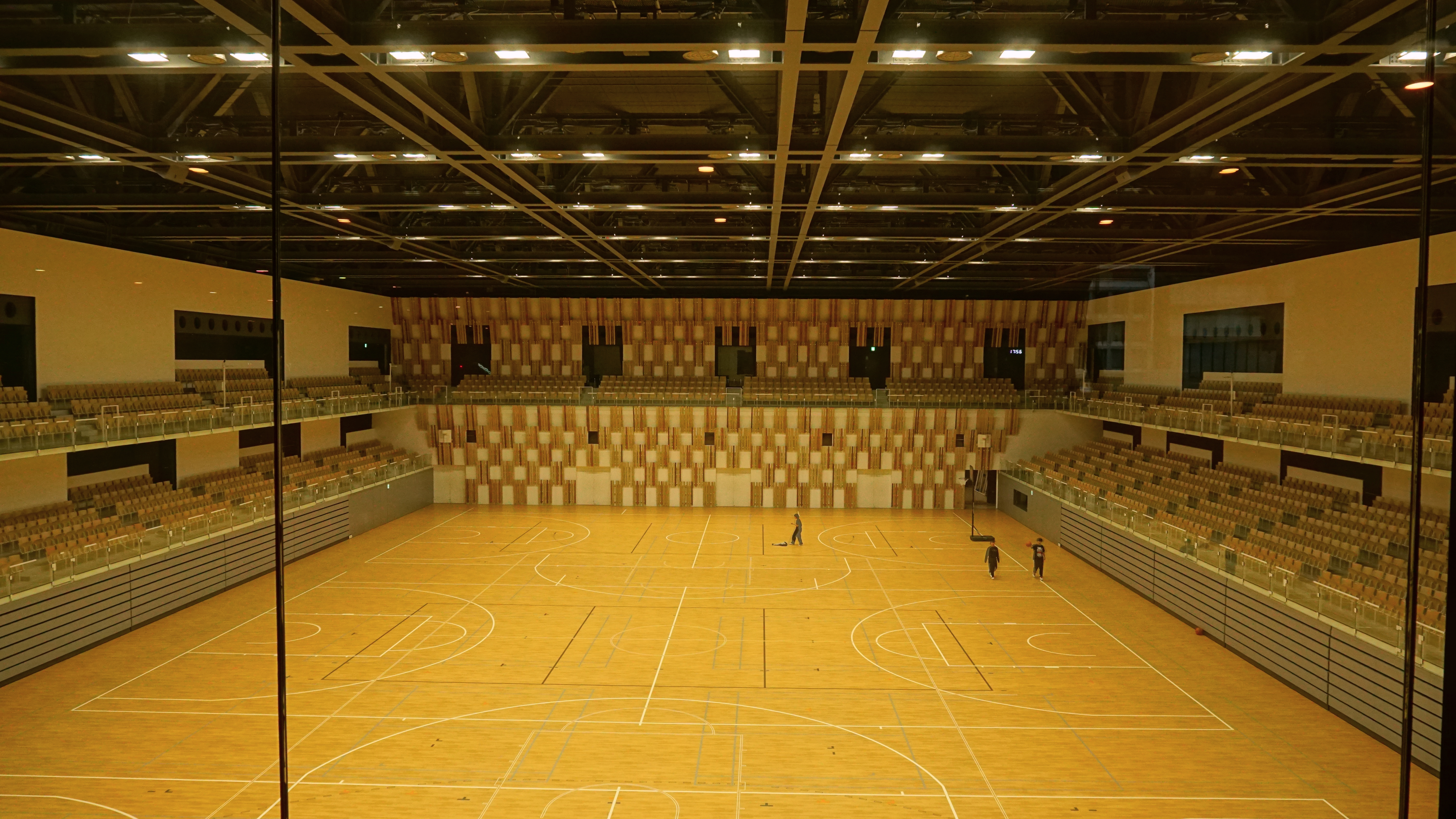
- Interactive map of City Hall Plaza Aore Nagaoka
- Full name: City Hall Plaza Aore Nagaoka
- Location: Nagaoka, Niigata, Japan
- Owner: Nagaoka city
- Operator: Nagaoka city
- Capacity: Theater:4,400; Center stage:5,100

Construction
- Opened: April 1, 2012
- Cost: JPY 12 billion
- Architect: Kengo Kuma
- Structural engineer: Norihiro Ejiri
- Main contractor: Taisei Corporation

Tenant
- Niigata Albirex BB

Website
- www.ao-re.jp

City Hall Plaza Aore Nagaoka is a multi-purpose arena and city hall in Nagaoka, Niigata, Japan. It is the home arena of the Niigata Albirex BB of the B.League, Japan's professional basketball league.

== Gallery ==
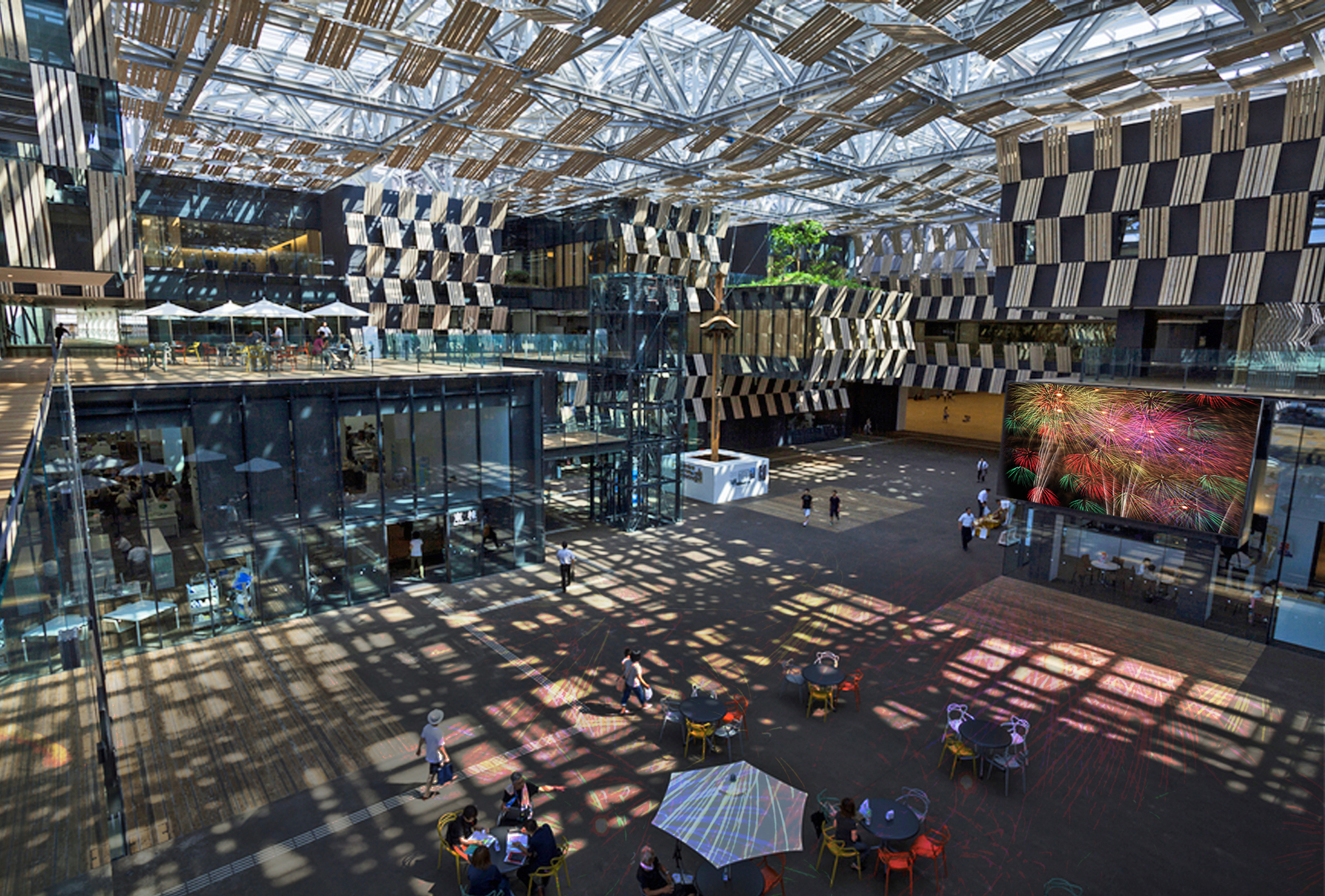

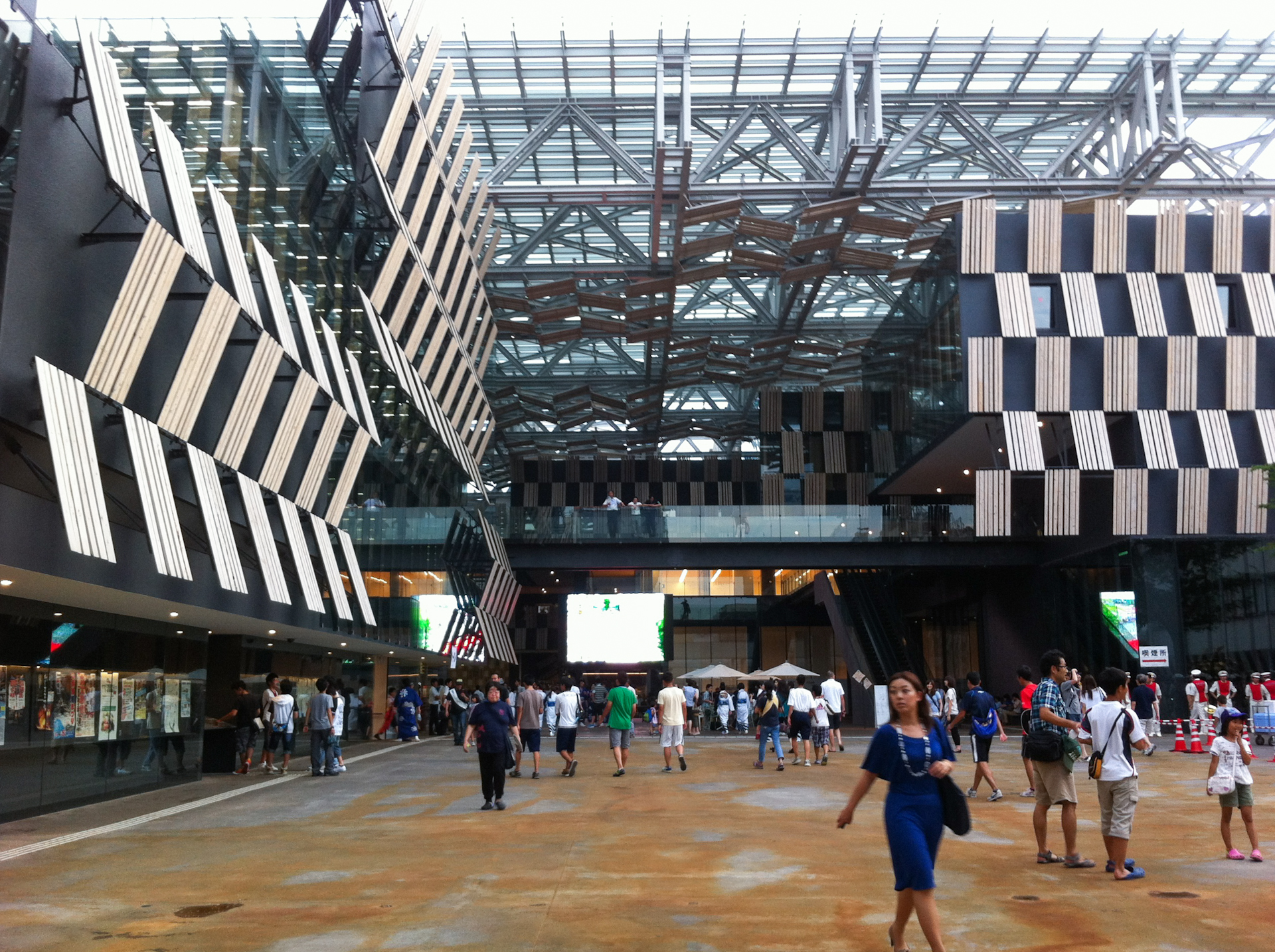

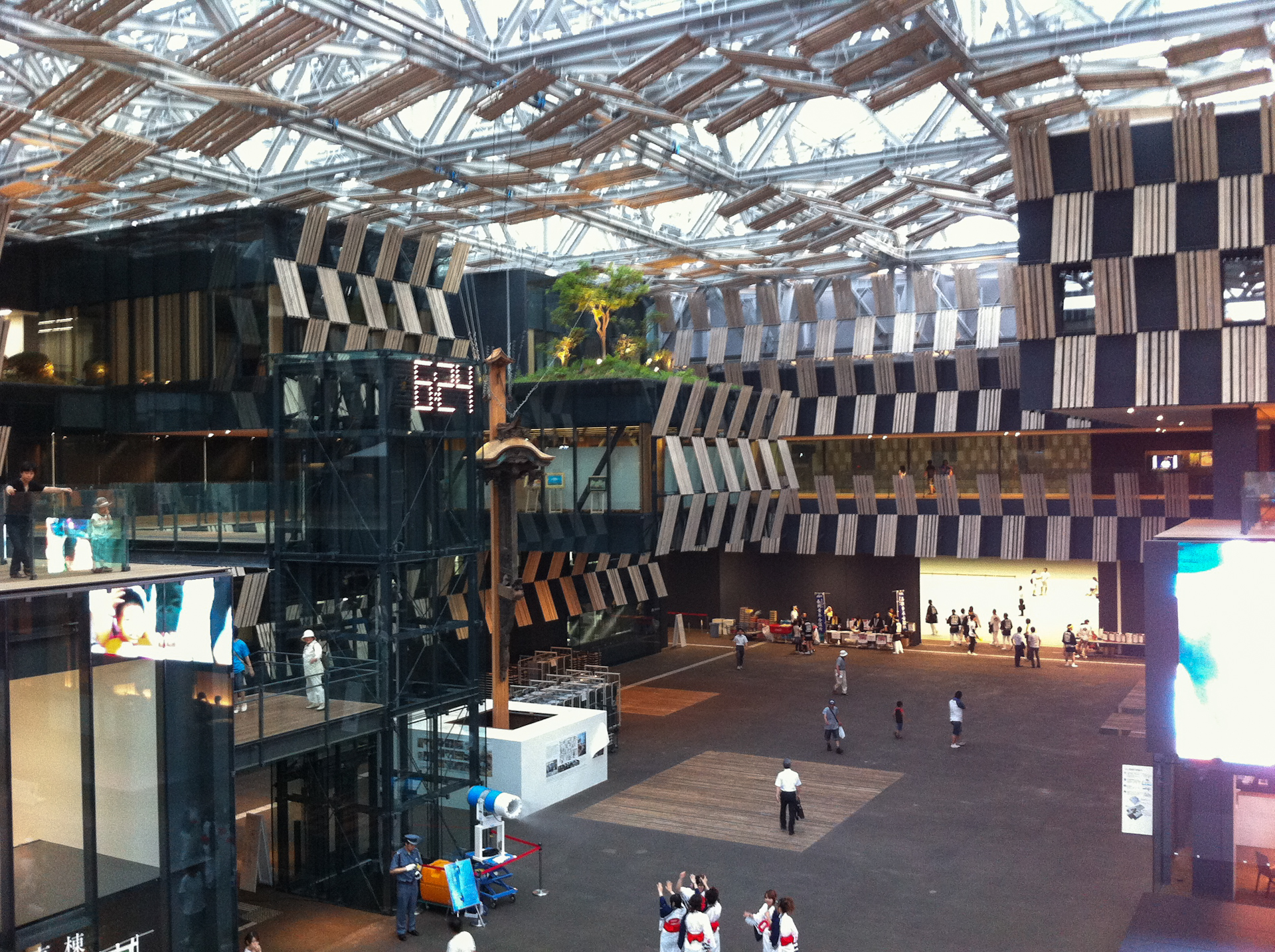

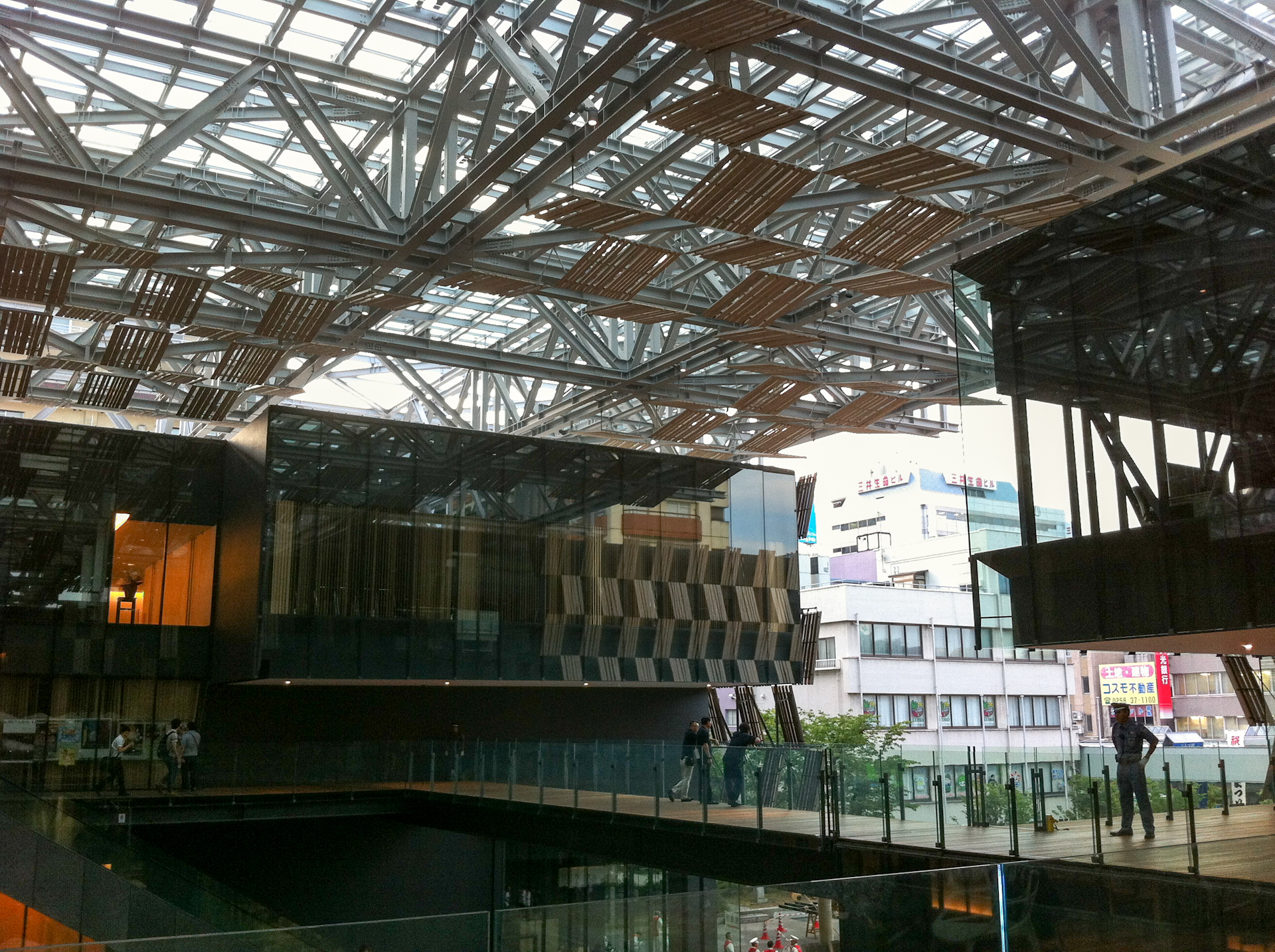

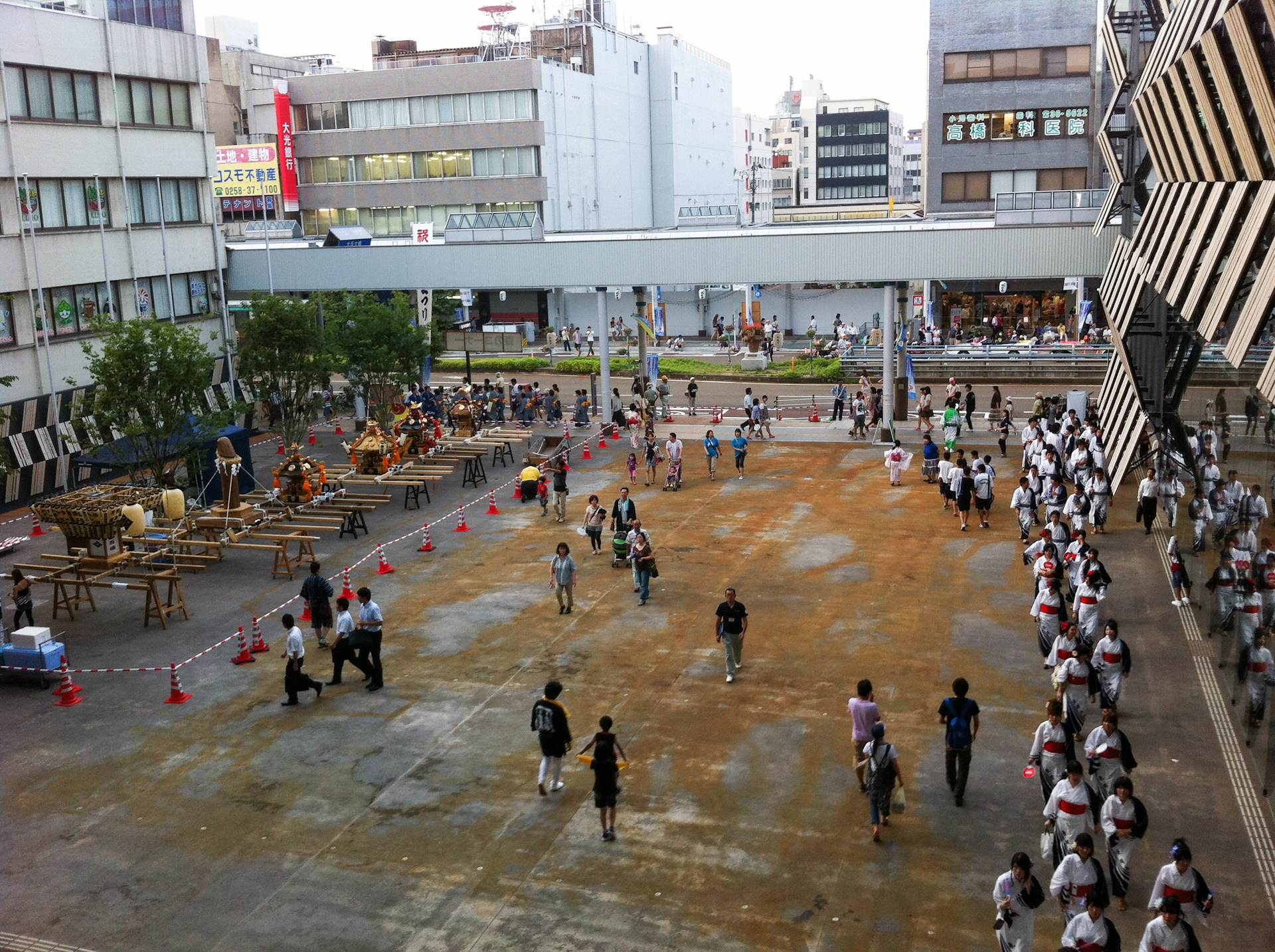

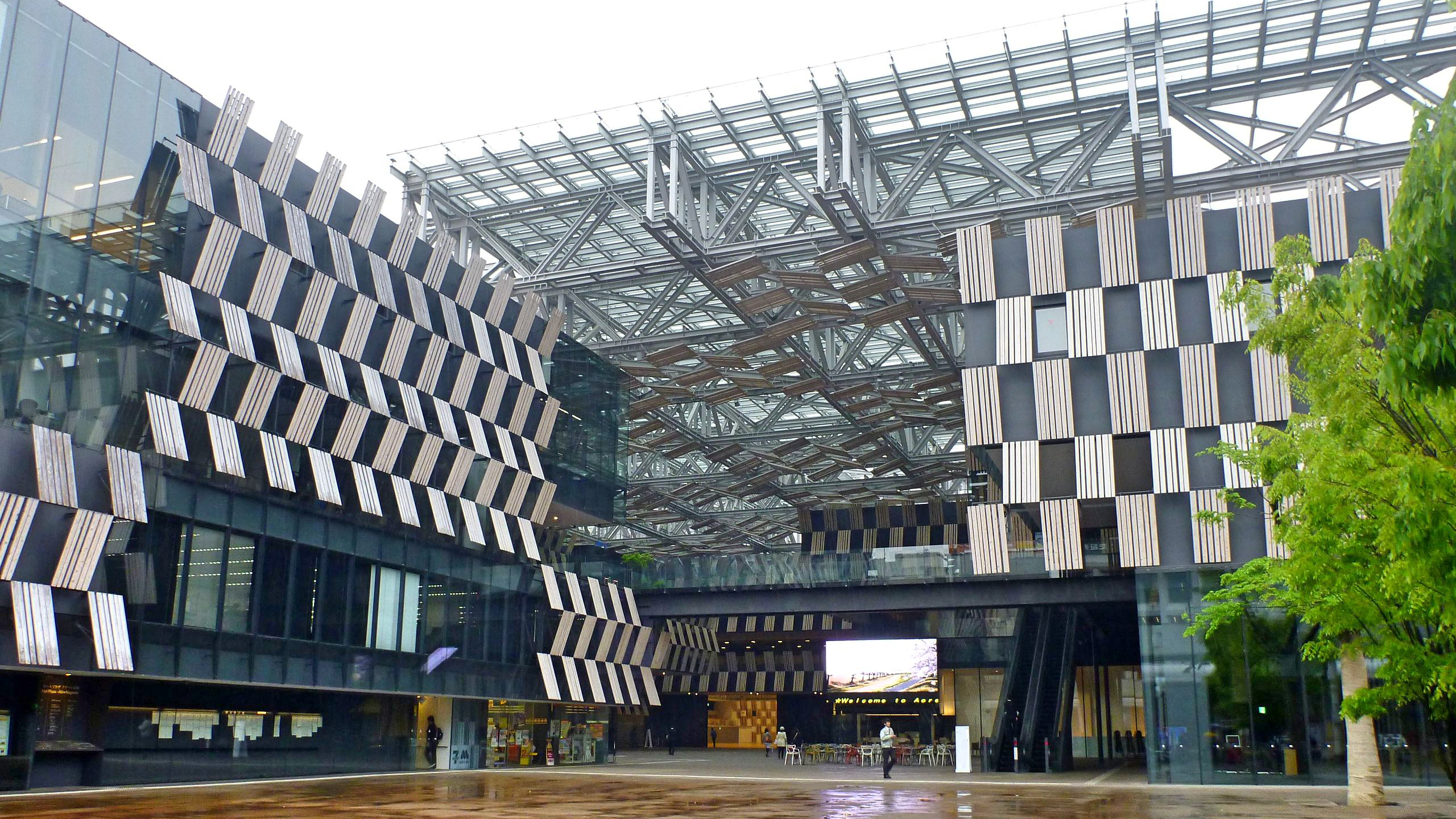

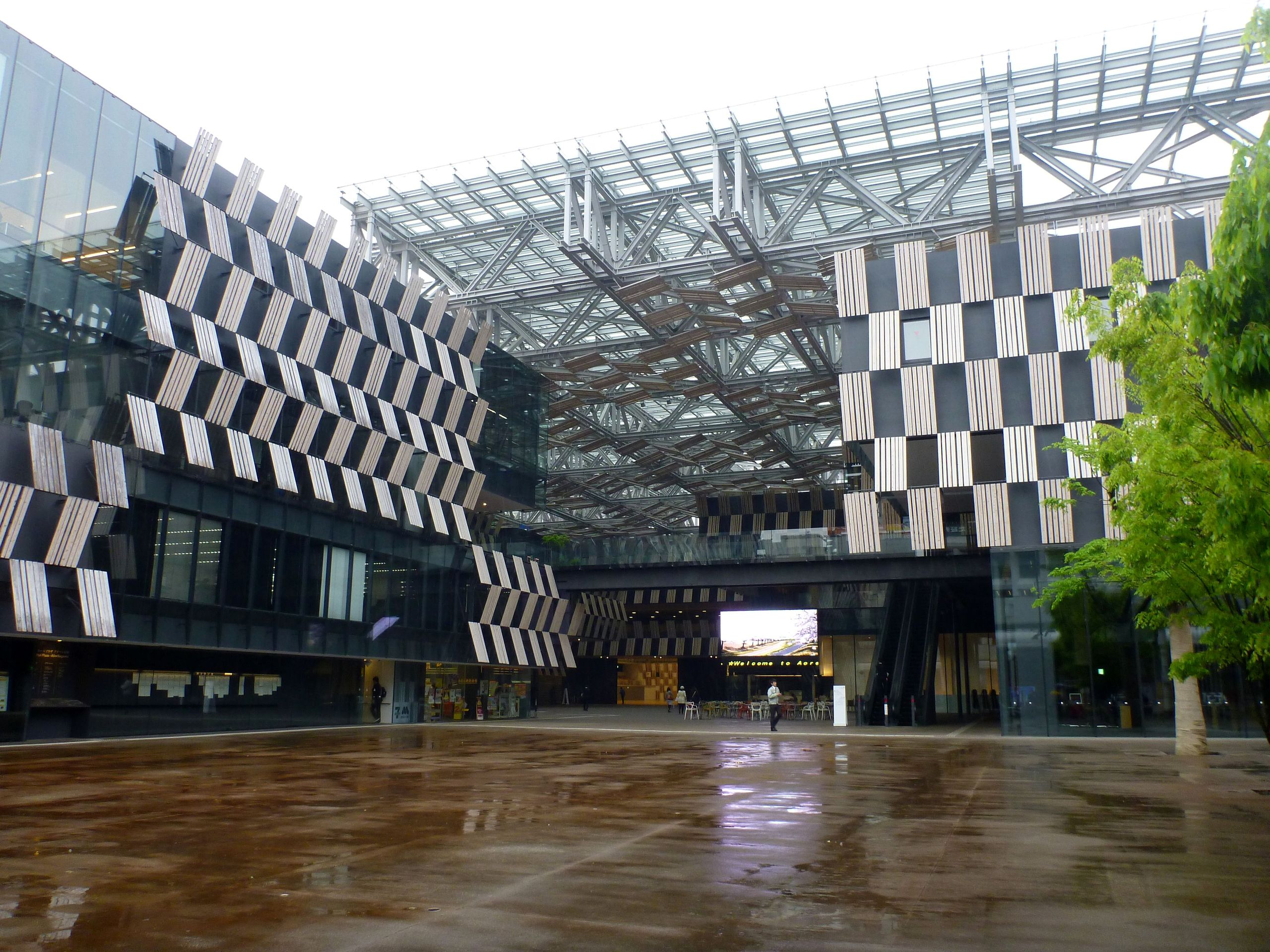

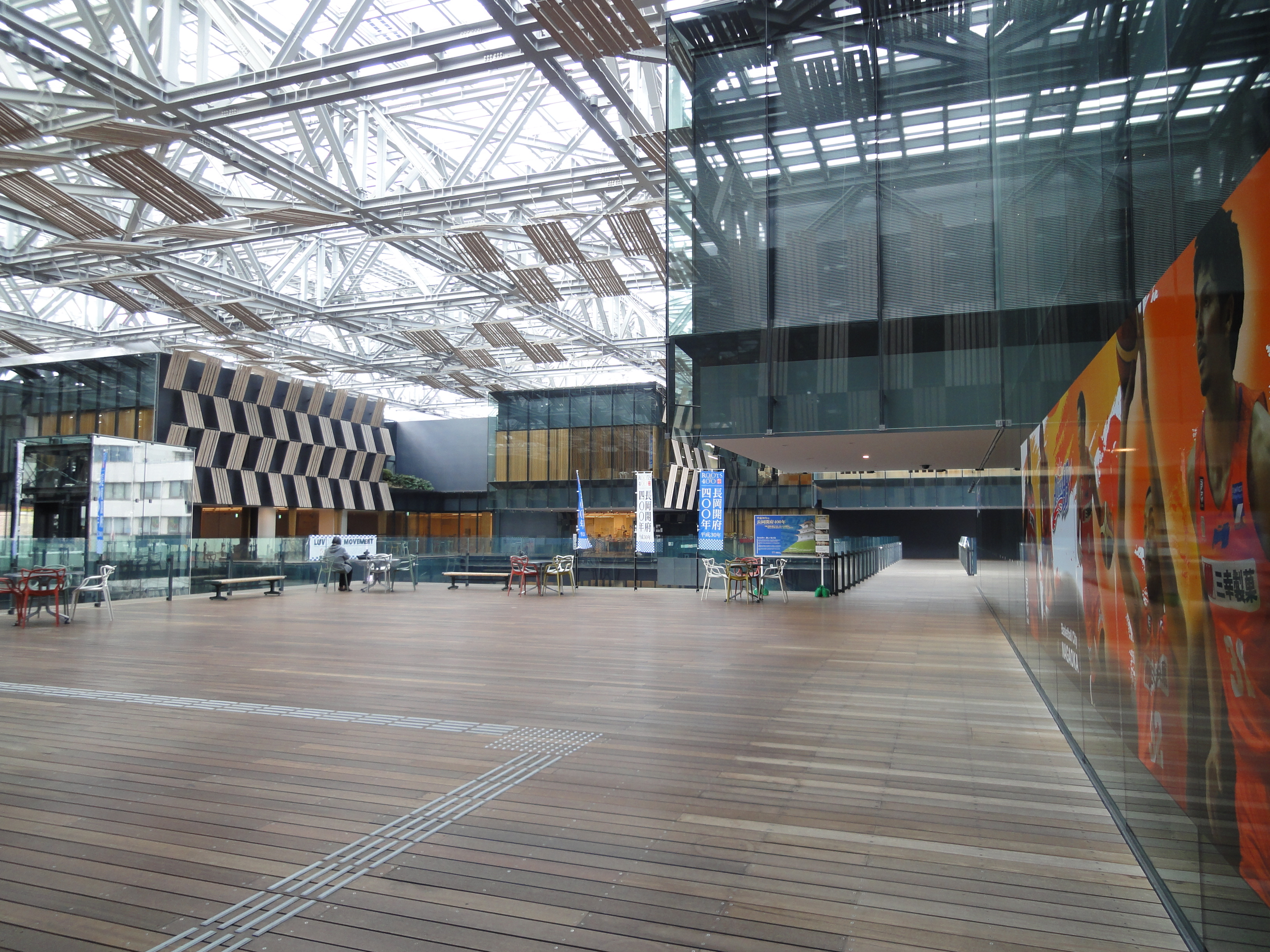

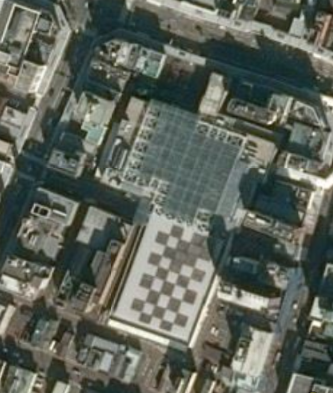
