= Xena (wrestler) =

Australian professional wrestler

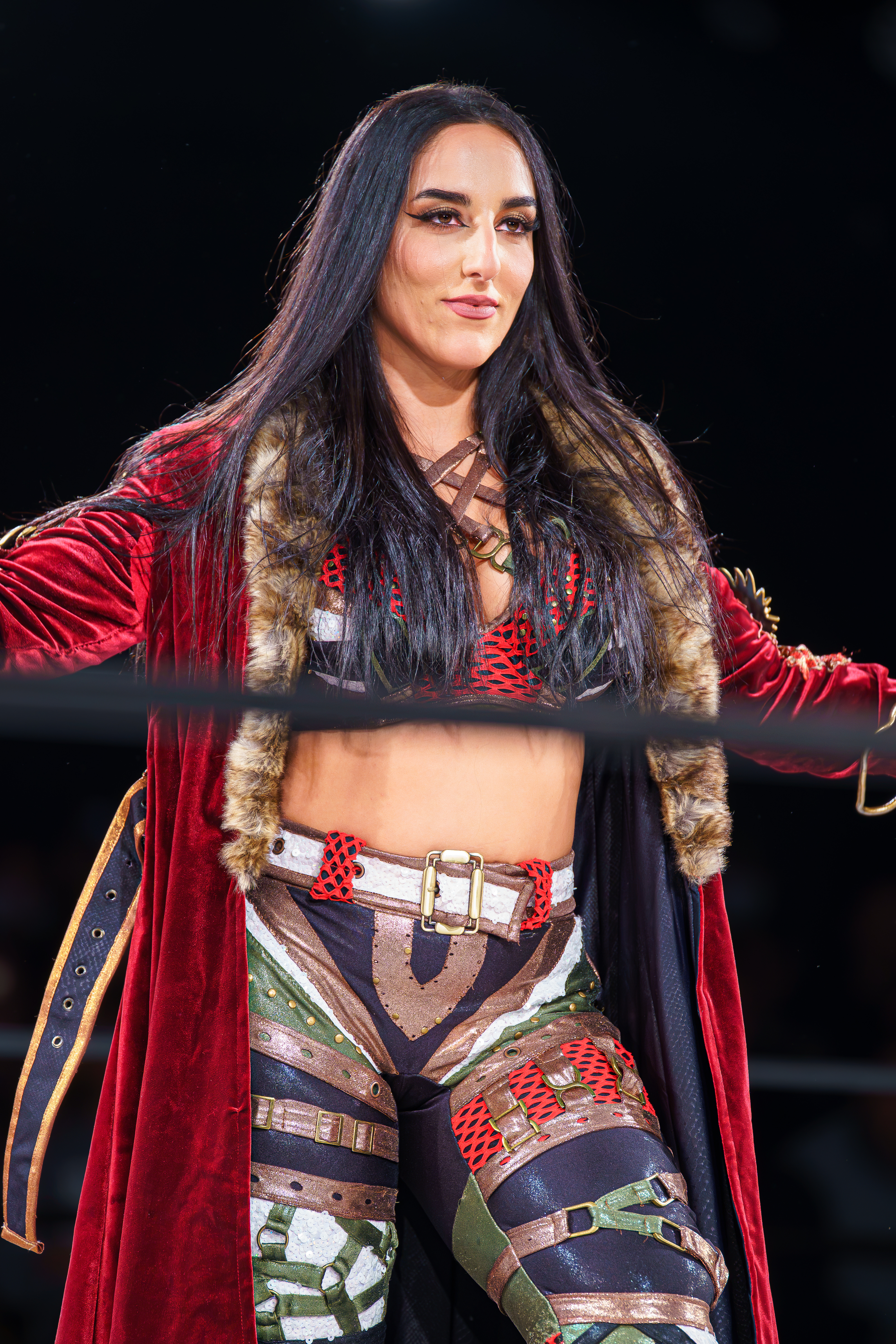
- Xena in January 2026

Personal information
- Born: 18 February 1997 (age 29) Sydney, New South Wales, Australia
- Life partner: Daga (2023–)

Professional wrestling career
- Ring name: Xena
- Trained by: Madison Eagles; Robbie Eagles; Mick Moretti
- Debut: October 6, 2018

Xena Kacho (born 18 February 1997), known by her ring name Xena, is an Australian professional wrestler. She is best known for her tenure in World Wonder Ring Stardom, where she was a former Artist of Stardom Champion.

== Professional wrestling career ==
=== World Wonder Ring Stardom (2023–2026) ===
==== Club Venus (2023–2024) ====
On the first night of the 2023 Cinderella Tournament on March 26, 2023, Xena was revealed as Club Venus' newest member, where she defeated Hina in the first round. Xena performed the best out of the Club Venus members by reaching the quarterfinals, where she lost to Mirai. On April 6, Mariah May and Xena were scheduled to team up with a mystery partner to face Stars (Hanan, Koguma and Saya Iida). On the day of the event, the mystery partner was revealed to be Jessie, fka Jessi Kamea in NXT and Jessie Elaban in the independent circuit. Jessie, May and Xena ended up winning the match. By September 30, Xena became the only foreign member still being part of the unit.

==== Empress Nexus Venus (2024–2026) ====
On January 20, 2024, Waka Tsukiyama, Hanako, Maika, Mina Shirakawa and Xena reformed Club Venus into a new stable, later given the name Empress Nexus Venus. On March 30, Maika, Shirakawa and Xena won the Artist of Stardom Championship by defeating Abarenbo GE.

At Stardom Supreme Fight 2026, the unit disbanded after Maika, Hanako, Xena, Waka Tsukiyama and Rian fell short to Mi Vida Loca's Suzu Suzuki, Rina Yamashita, Itsuki Aoki, and Akira Kurogane as a result of a 5-on-4 handicap unit dissolution elimination match. On June 20, 2026, Xena announced she would depart from Stardom, with her final match on July 8 against Waka Tsukiyama.

== Championships and accomplishments ==
- Future Wrestling Australia
  - FWA Women's Championship (4 times)
- Pro Wrestling Illustrated
  - Ranked No. 213 of the top 250 female wrestlers in the PWI Women's 250 in 2024
- World Wonder Ring Stardom
  - Artist of Stardom Championship (1 time) – with Maika and Mina Shirakawa
