= Miyu Amasaki =

Japanese professional wrestler

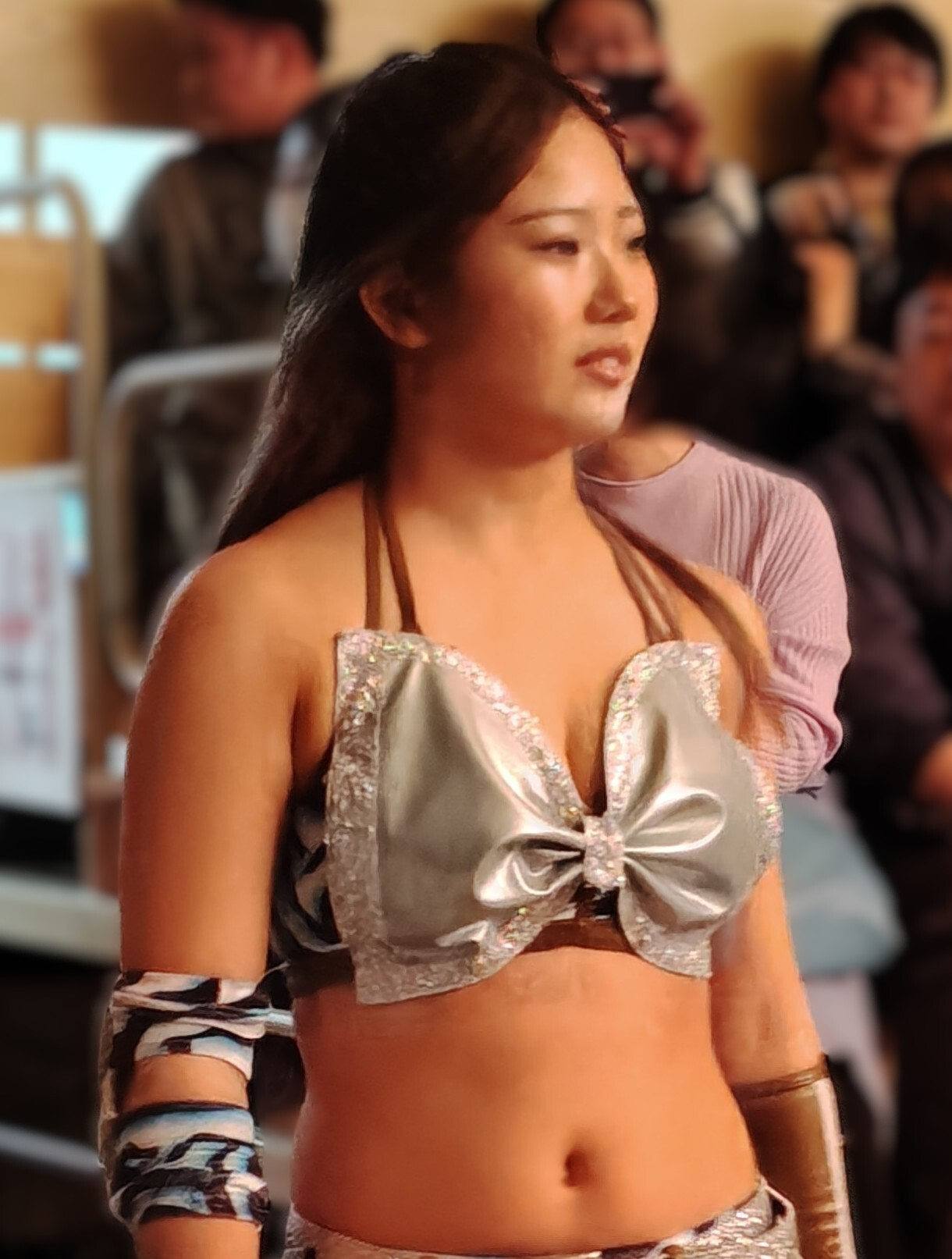
- Amasaki in February 2026

Personal information
- Born: Miyu Matsuda; April 25, 2002 (age 24) Kyoto City, Kyoto, Japan

Professional wrestling career
- Ring name: Miyu Amasaki
- Billed height: 162 cm (5 ft 4 in)
- Billed weight: 54 kg (119 lb)
- Trained by: Milano Collection A. T. Utami Hayashishita
- Debut: March 11, 2022

Miyu Matsuda (松田 光由, Matsuda Miyu; born April 25, 2002), better known by her ring name Miyu Amasaki (天咲 光由, Amasaki Miyu) is a Japanese professional wrestler. She is signed to World Wonder Ring Stardom where she is one half of the current Goddesses of Stardom Champions and a member of Neo Genesis. She is also a former Future of Stardom Champion and Artist of Stardom Champion.

== Professional wrestling career ==
=== World Wonder Ring Stardom (2022–present) ===
Amasaki made her professional wrestling debut on March 11, 2022 at World Wonder Ring Stardom's New Blood 1 event, dedicated to rookies, where she was defeated by Utami Hayashishita. Despite Amasaki's loss, Hayashishita was impressed by the Amasaki's performance and invited the debutant to join Queen's Quest which Amasaki immediately accepted. At the 2022 Cinderella Tournament, Amasaki was defeated by Hazuki in the first-round matches from April 3. At New Blood 3 on July 8, Amasaki began the Supernova Trial, a series of five matches against Stardom's top stars, with a loss to Giulia in the main event. At Stardom in Showcase vol.1, Amasaki was the runner up of a Nagoya rumble match won by Gokigen Death. Amasaki competed in the qualifiers of the 2022 5Star Grand Prix, where she finished in the second spot of her block with a total of four points, missing the qualification to Ami Sourei. At Stardom x Stardom: Nagoya Midsummer Encounter on August 21, Amasaki unsuccessfully challenged Hanan for the Future of Stardom Championship. Five days later at New Blood 4 on August 26, Amasaki main evented the show by falling short to Tam Nakano in the second match of the Supernova Trial.

After two months of in-ring break, Amasaki returned on November 3 at Hiroshima Goddess Festival, where she unsuccessfully competed in a five-way match won by AZM and also involving Lady C, Saya Iida and Waka Tsukiyama. Amasaki made her first appearance in the Goddesses of Stardom Tag League at the 2022 edition where she teamed up with her Queen's Quest sub-group of 02line tag partner AZM and competed in the Blue Goddess Block.

At New Blood Premium on March 25, 2023, Amasaki lost to Syuri in the third match of the Supernova Trial. A day later, Amasaki competed in the 2023 Cinderella Tournament, losing to Saya Iida in a first-round match. At New Blood 8 on May 12, Amasaki lost to Momo Watanabe in the fourth match of the Supernova Trial. Amasaki finished the Supernova Trial on July 2 at New Blood 9 with a loss to her 02line partner, AZM. At New Blood 10 on August 18, Amasaki lost to Saori Anou in an extra sixth match of the Supernova Trial. A day later at Midsummer Festival, Amasaki teamed with Kyoko Inoue and Queen's Quest stablemates Utami Hayashishita and AZM, losing an eight-woman tag team match against Dump Matsumoto, Zap and BMI2000. At New Blood 11 on September 28, Amasaki teamed with 02line partner AZM to compete in a three-way tag team match for the New Blood Tag Team Championship, which was won by wing★gori (Saya Iida and Hanan) defeating reigning champions Bloody Fate.

At New Blood 15 on September 29, 2024, Amasaki defeated Hina, and later challenged Future of Stardom Champion Rina to a title match at Nagoya Golden Fight. At the event on October 5, Amasaki defeated Rina to win the Future of Stardom Championship, making it the first title in Amasaki's career. At Year-End X'Mas Night on December 24, Amasaki secured her first successful title defense against Sayaka Kurara. On January 25, 2025 during day 1 of the Awards Show In Takadanobaba event, she defeated Azusa Inaba to make her second title defense. At Stardom In Osaka on February 12, Amasaki got her third title defense after going to a time-limit draw against Hanako. Fourteen days later, she dropped the title to Hina at Path of Thunder, ending her reign at 142 days.

=== New Japan Pro Wrestling (2022) ===
Due to being a World Wonder Ring Stardom roster member, Amasaki often competed in cross-over shows co-promoted by New Japan Pro Wrestling (NJPW). She made her first appearance at Historic X-Over on November 20, 2022, where she competed in a Stardom Rambo won by Mirai.

== Personal life ==
Amasaki has said that Dragon Gate was her first ever wrestling encounter, promotion which she used to watch since elementary school.

== Championships and accomplishments ==
- Pro Wrestling Illustrated
  - Ranked No. 118 of the top 250 female wrestlers in the PWI Women's 250 in 2025
- World Wonder Ring Stardom
  - Future of Stardom Championship (1 time)
  - Artist of Stardom Championship (1 time) – with AZM and Starlight Kid
  - Goddesses of Stardom Championship (1 time, current) – with AZM
  - Stardom Year-End Award (1 times)
    - Best Unit Award (2023) - as a part of Queen's Quest
