= List of former New Japan Pro-Wrestling personnel =

Former personnel of New Japan Pro-Wrestling

New Japan Pro-Wrestling (新日本プロレス, Shin Nihon Puroresu) (NJPW), is a Japanese professional wrestling promotion based in Nakano, Tokyo. Former employees in NJPW consist of professional wrestlers, managers, valets, play-by-play and color commentators, announcers, interviewers, referees, trainers, script writers, executives, and members of the board of directors.

== Personnel ==
†	Indicates person is deceased

Real name	Ring name(s)	Tenure	Ref
Yoshihiro Asai	Ultimo Dragon	1992–1998; 2004–2005; 2008	
Shelton Benjamin	Shelton X Benjamin	2012–2016	
Fergal Devitt	Prince Devitt	2006–2014	
Aaron Frobel	Michael Elgin	2014–2019	
Hiroshi Hase	Hiroshi Hase	1987–1996	
Mitsuhide Hirasawa	Bone Soldier; Captain New Japan; Hideo Saito; Mitsuhide Hirasawa	2006–2010; 2011–2017	
Dustin Howard	Chuckie T.	2017–2019	
Muhammad Hussain Inoki†	Antonio Inoki	1972–2005	
Allen Jones	AJ Styles	2008; 2014–2016	
Teruaki Kanemitsu	Kanemitsu	2016–2019	
Katsuya Kitamura†	Katsuya Kitamura	2015–2019	
Trevor Mann	Ricochet	2013–2017	
Greg Marasciulo	Berreta	2013; 2015–2019	
Brock Lesnar	Brock Lesnar	2005–2006	
Matthew Massie	Matt Jackson	2013–2019	
Nicholas Massie	Nick Jackson	2013–2019	
Shinsuke Nakamura	Shinsuke Nakamura	2002–2016	
Shinjiro Otani	Shinjiro Otani	1992–2001	
Cody Runnels	Cody	2016–2019	
Akebono Taro	Akebono	2006–2007	
Davey Smith	Black Assassin; Davey Boy Smith Jr. Harry Smith	2005; 2012–2019	
Tyson Smith	Kenny Omega	2010–2019	

== Notable former wrestlers ==
=== Japanese wrestlers ===
- Akira (Akira Nogami)
- Akiya Anzawa
- Atsushi Aoki ^{†}
- Go Asakawa
- Masahiro Chono
- Riki Choshu (Mitsuo Yoshida)
- Super Delfin (Hiroto Wakita)
- Tatsumi Fujinami
- Kazuyuki Fujita
- Yoshiaki Fujiwara
- Masakatsu Funaki
- Tatsutoshi Goto
- Shinya Hashimoto ^{†}
- HUB
- Kendo Kashin (Tokimitsu Ishizawa)
- Masahito Kakihara
- Kamikaze
- Koji Kanemoto
- W*ING Kanemura (Yukihiro Kanemura)
- Toshiaki Kawada
- Kenta Kobashi
- Osamu Kido ^{†}
- Kengo Kimura (Seiei Kimura)
- Shiro Koshinaka
- Shunji Kosugi
- Akira Maeda
- Naomichi Marufuji
- Kengo Mashimo
- Mitsuharu Misawa ^{†}
- Shigeo Miyato
- Kazunari Murakami
- Keiji Mutoh
- Mitsuya Nagai
- Hiroshi Nagao
- Katsuhiko Nagata
- Masayuki Naruse
- Osamu Nishimura ^{†}
- Nosawa Rongai / Black Tiger (Kazushige Nosawa)
- Michiyoshi Ohara
- Okumura (Shigeo Okumura)
- Takao Omori
- Akitoshi Saito
- Hiro Saito
- Masa Saito ^{†}
- Kazushi Sakuraba
- El Samurai (Osamu Matsuda)
- Naoki Sano
- Daisuke Sasaki
- Kensuke Sasaki
- The Great Sasuke (Masanori Murakawa)
- Kenzo Suzuki
- Tajiri (Yoshihiro Tajiri)
- Tatsuhito Takaiwa
- Nobuhiko Takada
- Yoshihiro Takayama
- Katsushi Takemura
- Masato Tanaka
- Minoru Tanaka
- Genichiro Tenryu
- Kaji Tomato
- Hiro Tonai
- Takashi Uwano
- Naofumi Yamamoto / Yoshitatsu
- Kazuo Yamazaki
- Ryushi Yanagisawa
- Tadao Yasuda
- Yoshiaki Yatsu
- Ayato Yoshida

=== Non-Japanese wrestlers ===
- Abdullah The Butcher (Lawrence Shreeve)
- American Dragon (Bryan Danielson)
- Arn Anderson (Martin Lunde)
- André the Giant (André Roussimoff) ^{†}
- Ángel de Oro
- Kurt Angle
- Averno (Renato Ruíz)
- Sangre Azteca
- Steve Austin (Steven Williams)
- Bob Backlund
- Michael Bennett
- Rey Bucanero (Arturo García)
- The Barbarian (Sione Vailahi)
- Crusher Bam Bam Bigelow (Scott Bigelow) ^{†}
- Black Tiger (Mark Rocco) ^{†}
- Black Tiger (II) (Eddie Guerrero) ^{†}
- Black Tiger (III) (César González) ^{†}
- Blue Wolf (Dolgorsürengiin Serjbüdee)
- Wes Brisco
- Jay Briscoe ^{†}
- Mark Briscoe
- Bruiser Brody (Frank Goodish) ^{†}
- Chyna (Joanie Laurer) ^{†}
- Adam Cole (Austin Jenkins)
- Rob Conway
- Consequences Creed (Austin Watson)
- Jay White
- Jax Dane
- Christopher Daniels / Curry Man (Daniel Covell)
- Diamante Azul
- Dr. Wagner Jr. (Juan González)
- Dynamite Kid (Thomas Billington) ^{†}
- Troy Endres ^{†}
- Ric Flair (Richard Fliehr)
- Fuego
- Rick Fuller
- Amber Gallows (Kimberly Davis)
- Héctor Garza (Héctor Solano) ^{†}
- Giant Bernard (Matthew Bloom)
- Chavo Guerrero Jr.
- Karl Gotch (Karl Istaz) ^{†}
- Daniel Gracie (Daniel Simoes)
- Rolles Gracie (Rolles Gracie Jr.)
- Cody Hall
- Scott Hall ^{†}
- Tony Halme ^{†}
- Stan Hansen (John Hansen Jr.)
- Jeff Hardy
- Bret Hart
- Owen Hart ^{†}
- Salman Hashimikov
- Hulk Hogan (Terry Bollea) ^{†}
- Maria Kanellis
- Brian Kendrick
- Jay Lethal (Jamar Shipman)
- Low Ki (Brandon Silvestry)
- Dean Malenko (Dean Simon)
- Máximo (José Alvarado)
- Mephisto
- Místico (Luis Urive)
- Místico (II) (Carlos Muñoz)
- Punisher Dice Morgan (Mark Calaway)
- Dick Murdoch ^{†}
- MVP (Hassan Assad)
- Jim Neidhart ^{†}
- Niebla Roja
- Scott Norton
- Quiet Storm
- Pac (Ben Satterley) ^{†}
- Pinoy Boy (Teddy Perkins)
- Pegasus Kid / Wild Pegasus (Chris Benoit) ^{†}
- Daniel Puder
- Jimmy Rave (James Guffey) ^{†}
- Rey Cometa (Mario González)
- Rey Escorpión (Fabian Nuñez)
- Davey Richards (Wesley Richards)
- Billy Robinson ^{†}
- Robert Roode
- Rick Rude (Richard Rood) ^{†}
- Rush (William Muñoz)
- Chris Sabin (Joshua Harter)
- Sabu (Terry Brunk) ^{†}
- Giant Singh (Dalip Singh)
- Giant Silva (Paulo César da Silva)
- Slex
- La Sombra (Manuel Andrade)
- James Storm (James Cox)
- Stuka Jr.
- Tiger Jeet Singh (Jagjit Singh)
- Davey Boy Smith (David Smith) ^{†}
- Rick Steiner (Robert Rechsteiner)
- Scott Steiner (Scott Rechsteiner)
- Sting (Steve Borden)
- Strong Man (Jon Andersen)
- Matt Sydal (Matthew Korklan)
- Michael Tarver (Tyrone Evans)
- Matt Taven (Matthew Marinelli)
- Terry Taylor (Paul Taylor III)
- Terrible (Damián Gutiérrez)
- El Texano Jr. (Juan Aguilar)
- Titán
- Travis Tomko
- Último Guerrero (José Gutiérrez)
- Rob Van Dam (Robert Szatkowski)
- Big Van Vader (Leon White) ^{†}
- Vangellys
- Volador Jr. (Ramón Ibarra)
- Road Warrior Animal (Joseph Laurinaitis) ^{†}
- Road Warrior Hawk (Michael Hegstrand) ^{†}
- Barry Windham
- Hanson
- Raymond Rowe
- Hangman Page (Stevie Woltz)

=== Joshi talent ===
- Kaoru Ito
- Manami Toyota
- Kairi
- Momoe Nakanishi
- Sachie Abe
- The Bloody
- Yumiko Hotta

== former factions ==
- BATT
- BLACK
- Black New Japan
- Bullet Club
- CHAOS
- Great Bash Heel
- Heisei Ishingun
- Just 5 Guys
- Legend
- Los Ingobernables de Japón
- Makai Club
- nWo Japan
- RISE
- Seigigun
- Suzuki-gun
- Team 2000

== Former staff and executives ==
- Fumihiko Ueai (1977–1984 → 1985–2004) (Sales Director, Executive Director, Director, Matchmaker)
- Naoki Ōtsuka (1972–1983) (Ring Announcer, Sales Director)
- Yoshihiko Ozaki (2002–2022) (Ring Announcer)
- Masakazu Kusama (2004–2005) (Representative Director and President)
- Simon Kelly Inoki (2000–2007) (Booker, Executive Director, Director, Representative Director and President)
- Hidekazu Tanaka (1981–2006) (Ring Announcer, Executive Director, Matchmaker)
- Yonetaro Tanaka (Japan Pro Wrestling → 1963 Retirement → 1964 Became Referee → 1973–1982 Referee Retirement) (Referee)
- Masao Tayama (1991–2008) (Referee)
- Yoshiyuki Nakamura (1989–2001) (Sales Department)
- Eiichiro Niijima (1998–2016) (Medical Trainer)
- Michael Craven (2018–2021) (General Manager, International Department)
- Takashi Iizuka/Mr. Takahashi Toshio Yamaguchi faction → 1972–1998 Referee Retirement) (Referee, Head of Referees, Matchmaker, Training Advisor)
- Mr. Henry (1972–1974) (Referee)
- Hideyuki Yamaguchi (2003–2005) (Ring Announcer, Sales Department, Events Department)
- Hideaki Yamanaka (1983–2005) (Sales Director, Executive Managing Director)

== Former presidents ==
Number	Name	Term	Notes
1st	Antonio Inoki	January 1972 – July 1989	Temporarily stepped down August–October 1983
2nd	Seiji Sakaguchi	July 1989 – June 1999	
3rd	Tatsumi Fujinami	June 1999 – June 2004	
4th	Masakazu Kusama	June 2004 – May 2005	
5th	Simon Kelly Inoki	May 2005 – March 2007	
6th	Naoki Sugabayashi	April 2007 – September 2013	Became Chairman in September 2013
7th	Kaname Tezuka	September 2013 – February 2016	
8th	Katsuhiko Harada	February 2016 – May 2018	
9th	Harold Meij	June 2018 – October 2020	
10th	Takami Ohbari	October 2020 – December 2023	
