= Historic X-Over 2 =

2022 professional wrestling event

- Promotional poster featuring various NJPW and Stardom wrestlers.
- Promotion(s): New Japan Pro-Wrestling; World Wonder Ring Stardom
- Date: November 17, 2024
- City: Osaka, Japan
- Venue: Osaka Prefectural Gymnasium
- Attendance: 3,547

Historic X-Over chronology
← Previous; Historic X-Over	Next → Historic X-Over in Guangzhou

New Japan Pro-Wrestling event chronology
← Previous; Fighting Spirit Unleashed	Next → Antonio Inoki Memorial Show

World Wonder Ring Stardom event chronology
← Previous; New Blood West 2	Next → New Blood 17

Historic X-Over 2 (pronounced Historic Crossover Two and also written as Historic X-Over II) was a professional wrestling event co-promoted by New Japan Pro-Wrestling (NJPW) and its subsidiary World Wonder Ring Stardom (Stardom). It took on November 17, 2024, at the Osaka Prefectural Gymnasium in Osaka, Japan and was the second event in the Historic X-Over chronology.

Nine matches were contested at the event, including one on the pre-show. The main event saw Zack Sabre Jr. and Maika defeat El Desperado and Starlight Kid. In another prominent match, Mayu Iwatani successfully retained the IWGP Women's Championship against Momo Watanabe.

== Production ==
=== Background ===
On January 31, 2012, card game company Bushiroad fully acquired New Japan Pro-Wrestling (NJPW) from video game developer Yuke's and on October 17, 2019, Bushiroad announced in a press conference that they had also acquired World Wonder Ring Stardom (Stardom).

NJPW and Stardom hold the first Historic X-Over on November 20, 2022, at Ariake Arena in Tokyo which was considered a success with over 7,000 fans attending the event. On October 10, 2023, the second Historic X-Over event was announced during a joint press conference by NJPW and Stardom, which would take place sometime in 2024. On April 23, 2024, NJPW announced that they would acquire Stardom, thus making Stardom a subsidiary of NJPW. With the acquisition being completed in late June. On June 9, NJPW announced that Historic X-Over 2 would take on November 17 at Osaka Prefectural Gymnasium.

=== Storylines ===
Historic X-Over 2 featured professional wrestling matches that result from scripted storylines, where wrestlers portray villains, heroes, or less distinguishable characters in the scripted events that build tension and culminate in a wrestling match or series of matches.

=== Event ===
The event started with the preshow tag team confrontation of Stardom talent Ranna Yagami and Sayaka Kurara, and Hanako and Aya Sakura, solded with the victory of the latters.

In the first main card bout, World of Stardom Champion Tam Nakano and Saori Anou picked up a victory over Syuri and Tomoka Inaba in tag team competition. Next up, Mei Seira, AZM and Miyu Amasaki outmatched Konami, Rina and Ruaka in six-woman tag team competition. In the fourth bout, Jeff Cobb, Callum Newman and Francesco Akira defeated Toru Yano, Tiger Mask IV and Boltin Oleg. The fifth bout saw Natsuko Tora and Saya Kamitani teaming up with Drilla Moloney and Gabe Kidd to defeat Hanan, Saya Iida, Hiroshi Tanahashi and Ryusuke Taguchi in an eight-person mixed tag team bout. Next up, Great-O-Khan defeated Suzu Suzuki in an intergender hardcore match to secure the first defense of the Provisional KOPW Championship in that respective reign. This premiered as the first time when a female wrestler challenged for a male championship in NJPW. In the seventh bout, Taichi and Natsupoi defeated Clark Connors and Thekla in an intergender tag team bout. In the semi main event, Mayu Iwatani defeated Momo Watanabe to secure the eighth consecutive defense of the IWGP Women's Championship in that respective reign. After the bout concluded, Iwatani received a title challenge from AZM in a match scheduled to take place at Wrestle Kingdom 19.

In the main event, IWGP World Heavyweight Champion Zack Sabre Jr. teamed up with Maika to defeat El Desperado and Starlight Kid in an intergender tag team bout.

== Matches ==
No.	Results	Stipulations	Times
1^{P}	Hanako and Aya Sakura defeated Ranna Yagami and Sayaka Kurara	Tag team match	9:57
2	Cosmic Angels (Tam Nakano and Saori Anou) defeated God’s Eye (Syuri and Tomoka Inaba)	Tag team match	10:16
3	Neo Genesis (Mei Seira, AZM and Miyu Amasaki) defeated H.A.T.E. (Konami, Rina and Ruaka)	Six-woman tag team match	10:41
4	United Empire (Jeff Cobb, Callum Newman and Francesco Akira) defeated Toru Yano, Tiger Mask IV and Boltin Oleg	Six-man tag team match	8:05
5	H.A.T.E. (Natsuko Tora and Saya Kamitani) and Bullet Club War Dogs (Drilla Moloney and Gabe Kidd) defeated wing☆gori (Hanan and Saya Iida) and Hiroshi Tanahashi and Ryusuke Taguchi	Eight-person mixed tag team match	13:57
6	Great-O-Khan (c) defeated Suzu Suzuki	Intergender hardcore match for the Provisional KOPW Championship	21:13
7	Taichi and Natsupoi defeated Clark Connors and Thekla	Mixed tag team match	22:37
8	Mayu Iwatani (c) defeated Momo Watanabe	Singles match for the IWGP Women's Championship	24:13
9	Zack Sabre Jr. and Maika defeated El Desperado and Starlight Kid	Mixed tag team match	21:23
(c) / – the champion(s) heading into the match; P / – the match was broadcast on the pre-show

== See also ==
- 2024 in professional wrestling
- List of major NJPW events
- List of major World Wonder Ring Stardom events
