= List of New Japan Pro-Wrestling personnel =

New Japan Pro-Wrestling (NJPW) is a Japanese professional wrestling promotion based in Nakano, Tokyo. NJPW personnel consists of professional wrestlers, commentators, ring announcers, referees, trainers, producers, bookers, and various other positions. Executives and board members are also listed.

== Background ==
NJPW contracts typically range from developmental deals for dojo trainees to full-time contracts. Personnel appear on untelevised live events and on televised events which are aired on various broadcasters or on NJPW's own international streaming service, New Japan World.

Personnel is organized by their role in NJPW. The performer's ring name is listed on the left and their real name is on the right. This list also acknowledges which stable (referred to by NJPW as "units") a wrestler is a part of – this is listed as it is considered by NJPW to be a vital part of their product.

As of 2025, there are five central units in NJPW:

- Hontai (Note: Japanese: 本隊; the "Main Unit")
- House of Torture
- TMDK
- Unbound Co.
- United Empire

NJPW produces a U.S.-based internet television program titled NJPW Strong Live; Strong Live features its own distinct roster and units. Beginning in 2022, NJPW launched NJPW Tamashii, an Australasian-based subsidiary—Tamashii additionally features its own distinct roster and units. NJPW refers to their dojo trainees and developmental wrestlers as "Young Lions".

As NJPW has working relationships with All Elite Wrestling (AEW), Consejo Mundial de Lucha Libre (CMLL), Major League Wrestling (MLW), Revolution Pro Wrestling (RPW), Ring of Honor (ROH) and numerous other Japanese and international promotions, wrestlers from these promotions may appear on NJPW events and have their home promotions or stables from their home promotions listed as their affiliated unit.

== Wrestlers ==
=== Main roster ===
==== Heavyweights ====
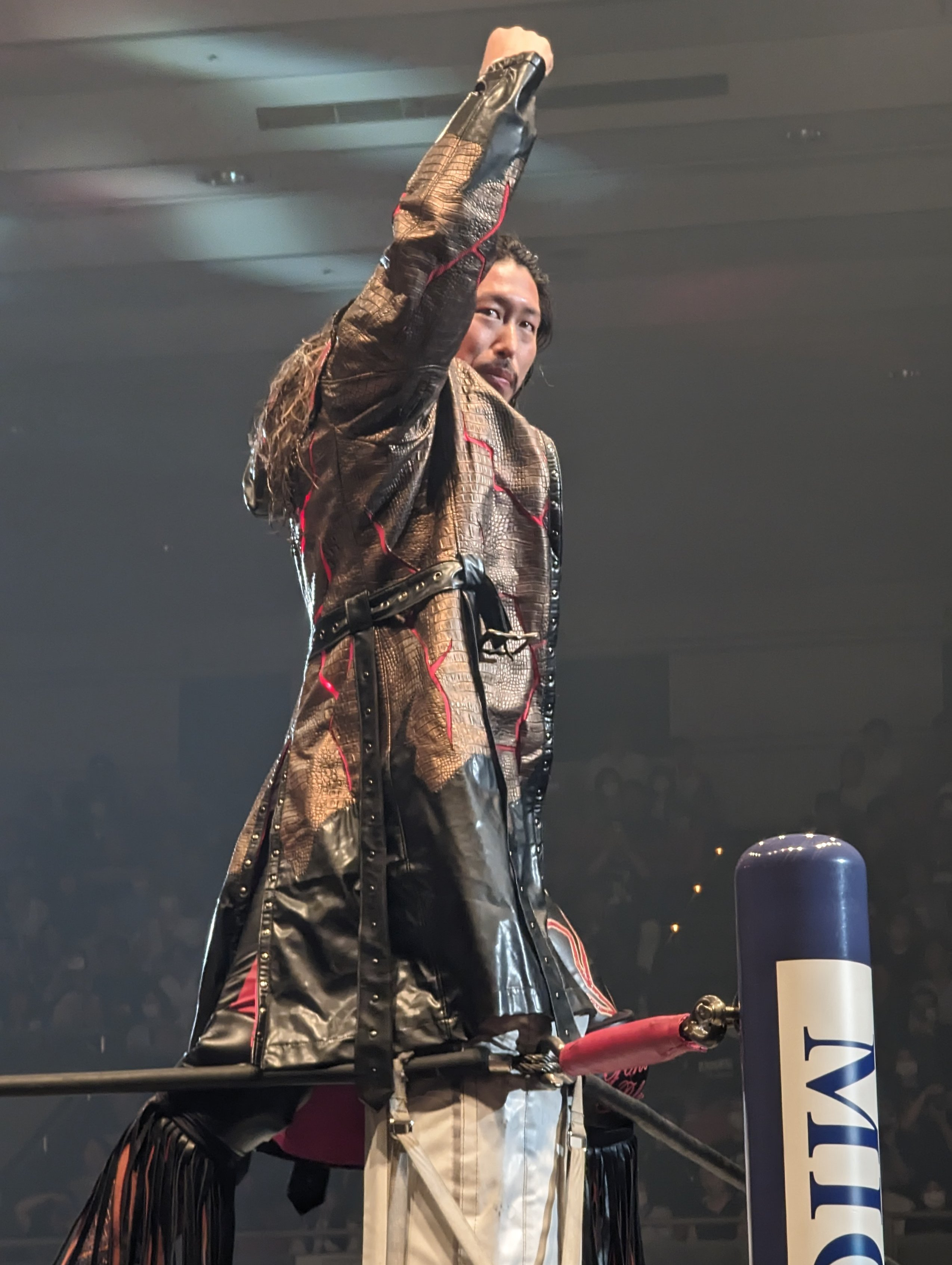
Yota Tsuji

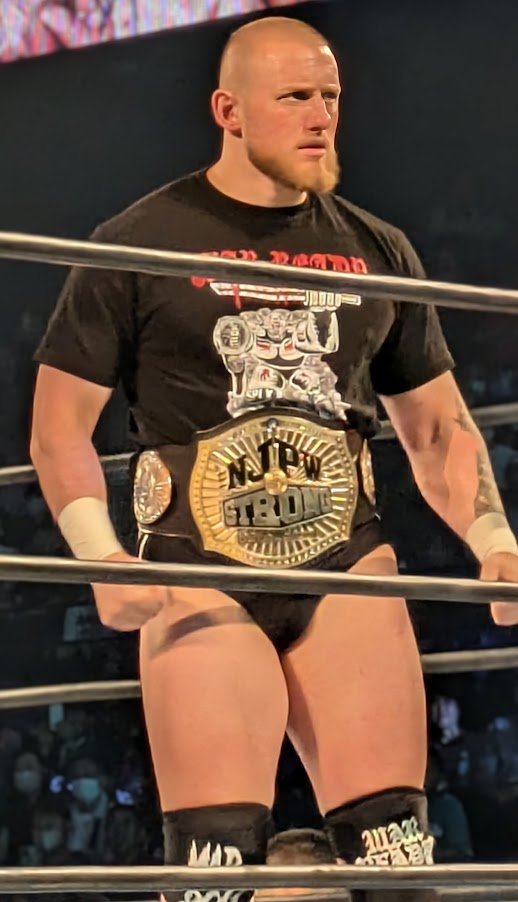
Gabe Kidd

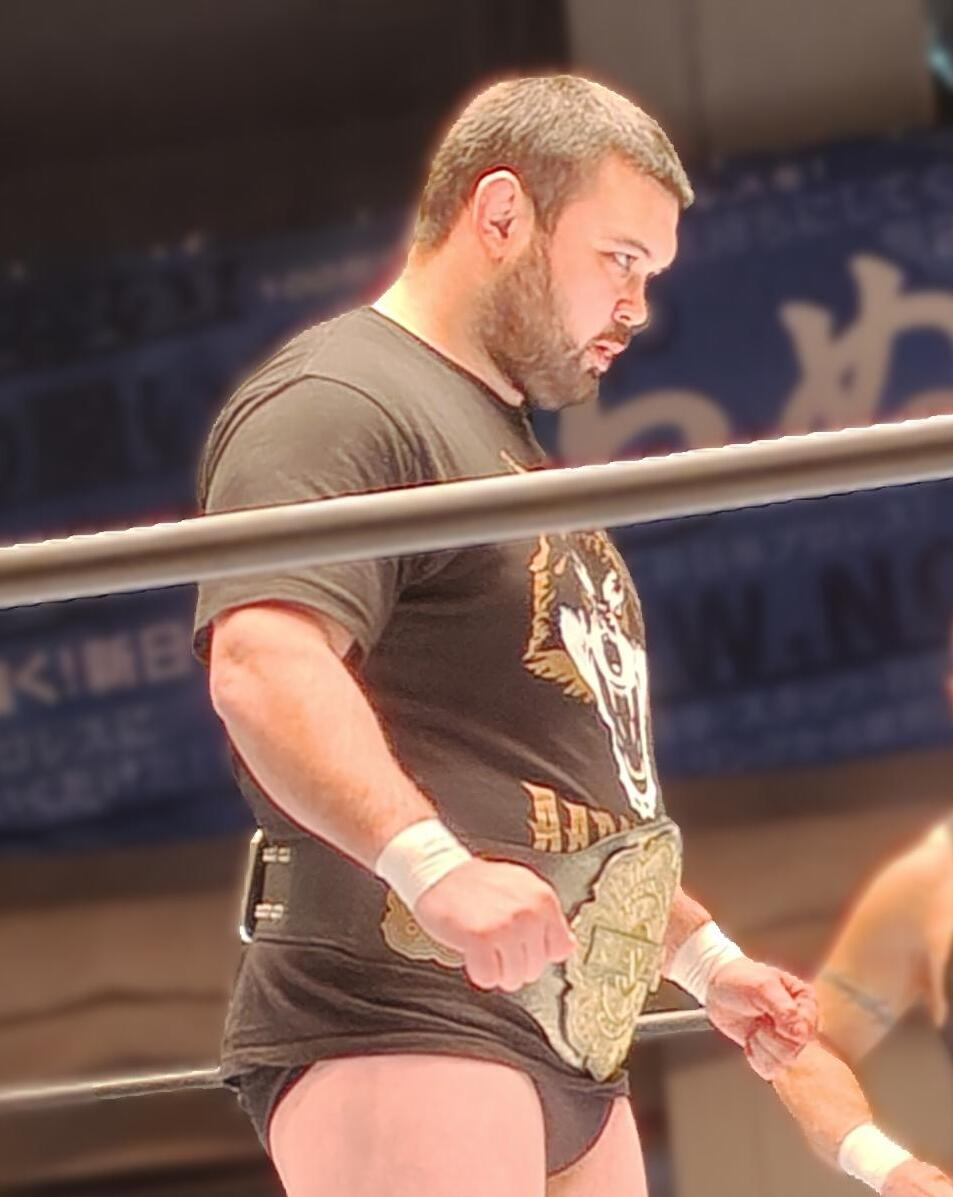
Aaron Wolf

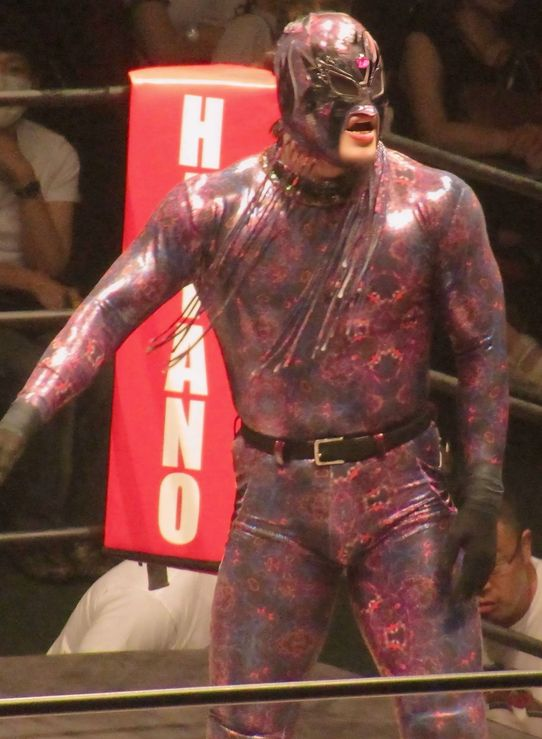
Shun Skywalker

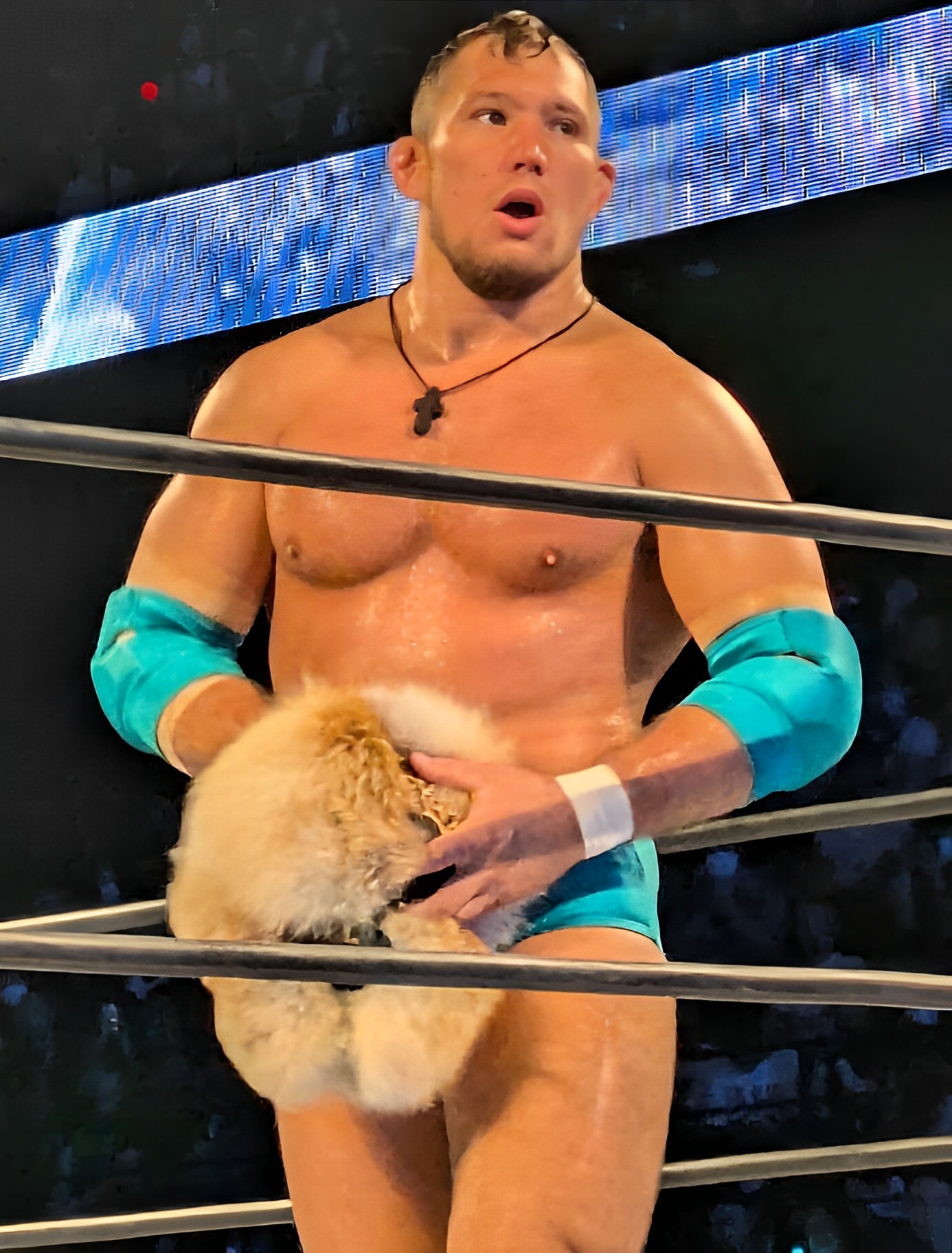
Boltin Oleg

Yuto-Ice

Oskar

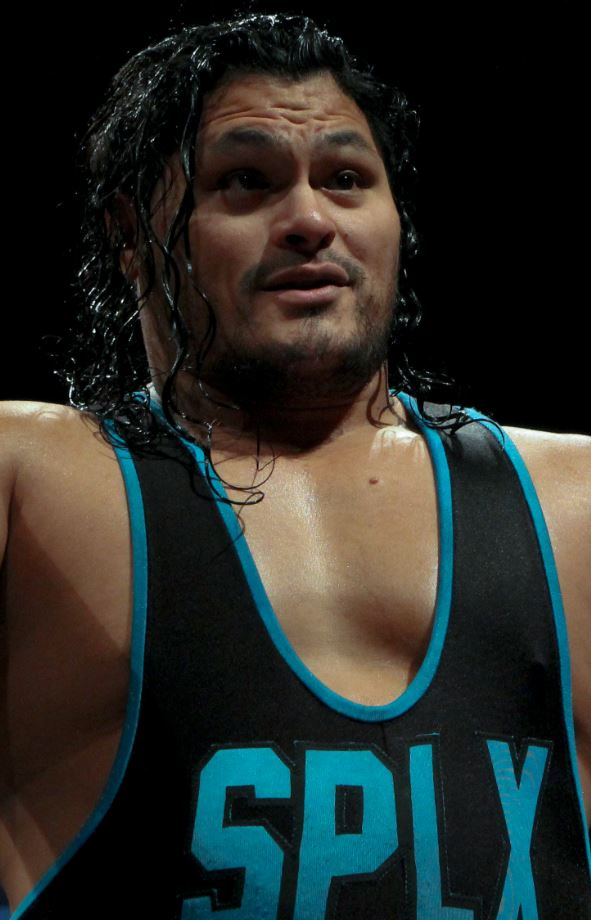
Jeff Cobb

Ring name	Real name	Unit	Notes
Aaron Wolf	Aaron Wolf	Hontai	NEVER Openweight Champion
Andrade El Ídolo	Manuel Andrade Oropeza	United Empire	Signed to All Elite Wrestling
Ares	Triệu Phong	VPW	Freelancer
Boltin Oleg	Oleg Boltin	Hontai	Strong Openweight Champion
Callum Newman	Callum Newman	United Empire (L)	
Chase Owens	Steven Owens	House of Torture	
Don Fale	Simi Fale	House of Torture	NJPW TAMASHII Openweight Champion; Head of Tamashii; Trainer
Drilla Moloney	Daniel Moloney	Unbound Co.	
El Phantasmo	Riley Vigier	Hontai	
Gabe Kidd	Gabriel McMenamin	Death Riders	Signed to All Elite Wrestling; IWGP Global Heavyweight Champion
Great-O-Khan	Tomoyuki Oka	United Empire	
Hartley Jackson	Hartley Jackson	TMDK	Freelancer; Trainer
Henare	Aaron Henry	United Empire	
Hirooki Goto	Hirooki Goto	Hontai	
Jake Lee	Lee Jae-kyung	United Empire	
Jeff Cobb	Jeffrey Cobb	Unbound Co.	NEVER Openweight 6-Man Tag Team Champion
Jon Moxley	Jonathan Good	Death Riders	Signed to All Elite Wrestling
Kenny Omega	Tyson Smith	AEW	Signed to All Elite Wrestling
Konosuke Takeshita	Konosuke Takeshita	Hontai	Signed to All Elite Wrestling and DDT Pro-Wrestling
Oskar	Oskar Münchow	Unbound Co.	IWGP Tag Team Champion; NEVER Openweight 6-Man Tag Team Champion
Ren Narita	Ren Narita	House of Torture (L)	
Ryohei Oiwa	Ryohei Oiwa	TMDK	
Sanada	Seiya Sanada	House of Torture	
Satoshi Kojima	Satoshi Kojima	Hontai	
Shingo Takagi	Shin Takagi	Unbound Co.	
Shota Umino	Shota Umino	Hontai	
Shun Skywalker	Shun Watanabe	House of Torture	NJPW World Television Champion
Taichi	Taichiro Maki	Hontai	
Togi Makabe	Shinya Makabe	Hontai	Trainer
Tomoaki Honma	Tomoaki Honma	Hontai	
Toru Yano	Toru Yano	Hontai	
Will Ospreay	William Ospreay	United Empire	Signed to All Elite Wrestling
Yoshi-Hashi	Nobuo Yoshihashi	Hontai	
Yota Tsuji	Yota Tsuji	Unbound Co.	IWGP Heavyweight Champion
Yuji Nagata	Yuji Nagata	Hontai	Trainer; IWGP Executive Committee Member
Yujiro Takahashi	Yujiro Takahashi	House of Torture	
Yuto-Ice	Yuto Nakashima	Unbound Co.	IWGP Tag Team Champion; NEVER Openweight 6-Man Tag Team Champion
Yuya Uemura	Yuya Uemura	Hontai	
Zack Sabre Jr.	Luke Eatwell	TMDK (L)	CMLL World Heavyweight Championship
Zane Jay	Zane Jacobson	United Empire	

==== Junior heavyweights ====
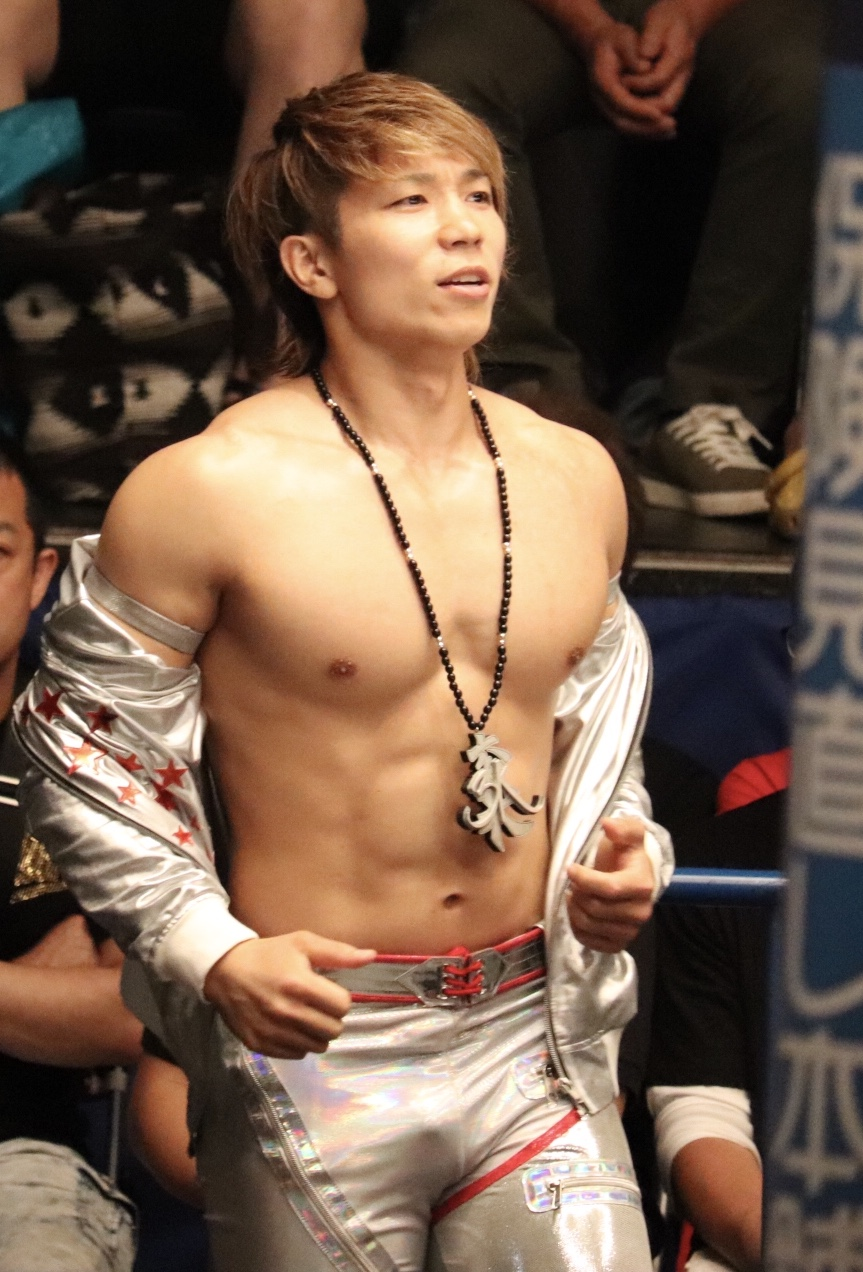
Yoh

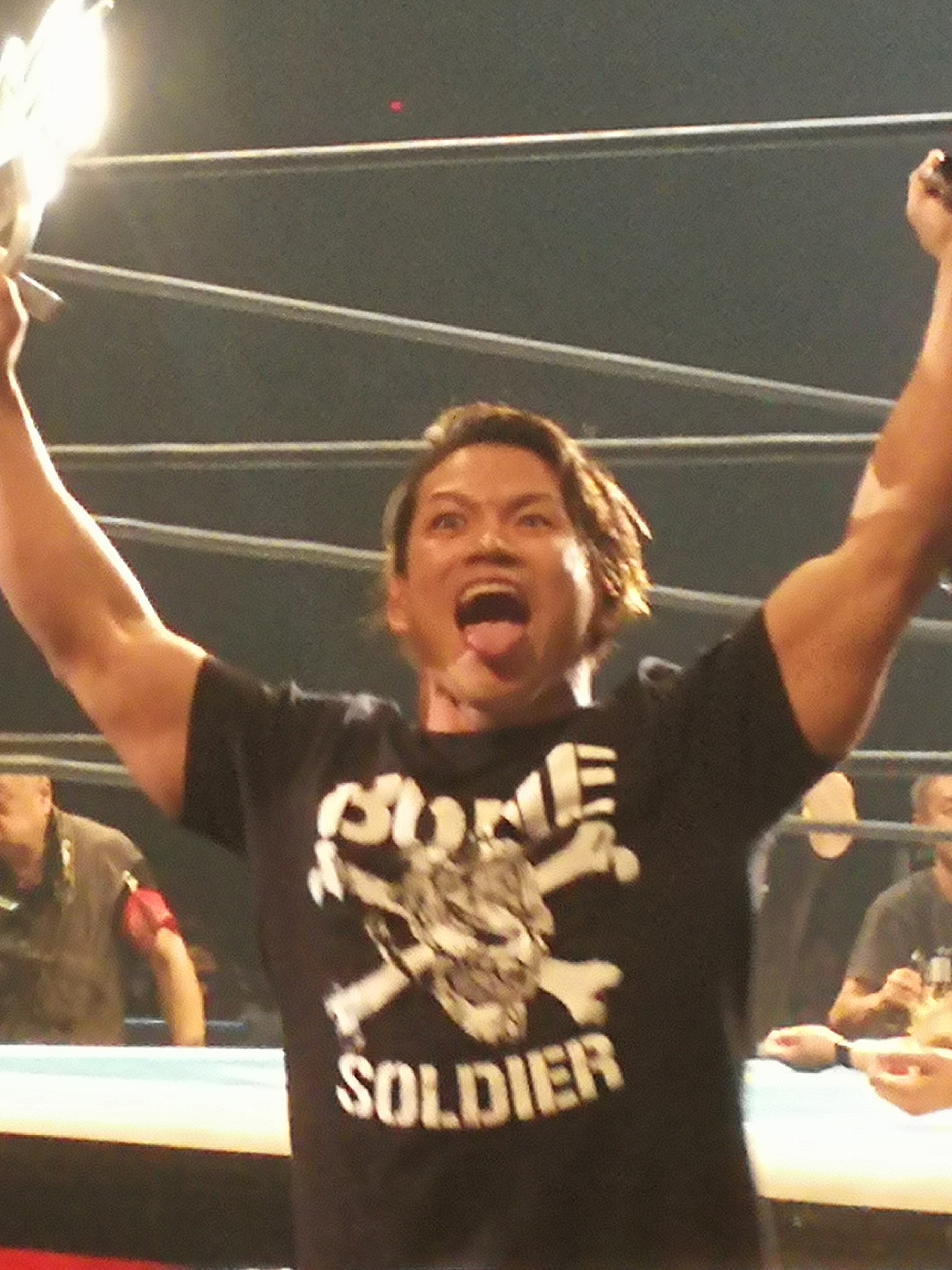
Taiji Ishimori

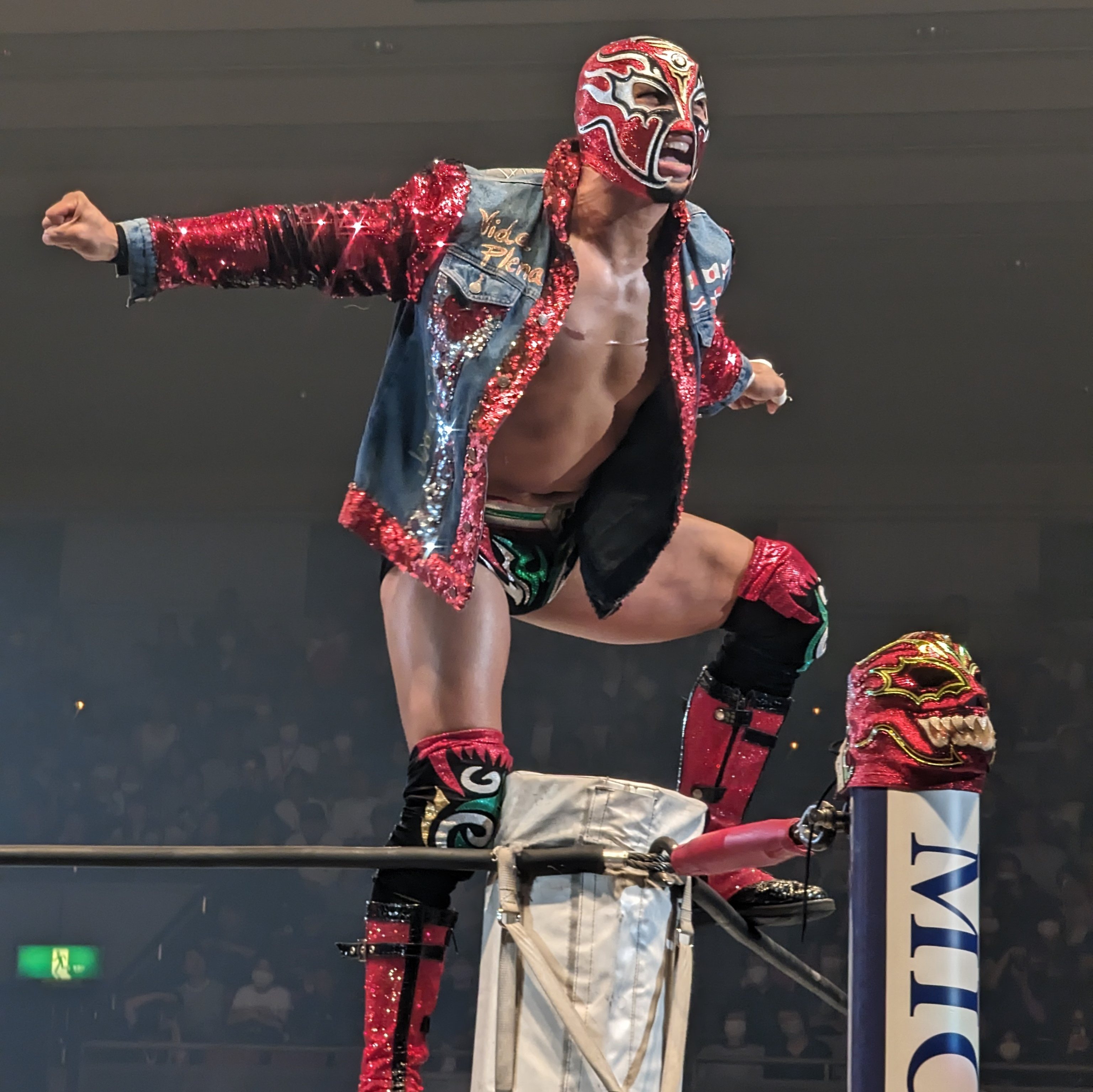
Titán

Ring name	Real name	Unit	Notes
Dick Togo	Shigeki Sato	House of Torture	Producer
Douki	Tatsuya Hayama	House of Torture	
Francesco Akira	Francesco Begnini	United Empire	
Gedo	Keiji Takayama	Unbound Co.	Co-Head Booker; Producer
Jado	Shoji Akiyoshi	Hontai	Co-Head Booker; Trainer; Producer
Jakob Austin Young	Jacob Criger	United Empire	
Kosei Fujita	Kosei Fujita	TMDK	
Kushida	Yujiro Kushida	Hontai	Trainer
Master Wato	Hirai Kawato	Hontai	
Místico	Luis Urive Alvirde	CMLL	Signed to All Elite Wrestling and Consejo Mundial de Lucha Libre
Robbie Eagles	James McMathaus	TMDK	
Robbie X	Robert Bell	Unbound Co.	Freelancer
Ryusuke Taguchi	Ryusuke Taguchi	Hontai	Trainer
Sho	Sho Tanaka	House of Torture	
Taiji Ishimori	Taiji Ishimori	Unbound Co.	Strong Openweight Tag Team Champion
Taka Michinoku	Takao Yoshida	JTO	Owner of JTO
Templario	Undisclosed (Note: As a long-standing tradition, the identities of masked professional wrestlers from Mexico is kept secret from the general public.)	United Empire	Signed to Consejo Mundial de Lucha Libre
Titán	Undisclosed	Unbound Co.	Signed to Consejo Mundial de Lucha Libre; Strong Openweight Tag Team Champion
Yoh	Yohei Komatsu	Hontai	IWGP Junior Heavyweight Champion
Yoshinobu Kanemaru	Yoshinobu Kanemaru	House of Torture	Producer

==== Women's division ====
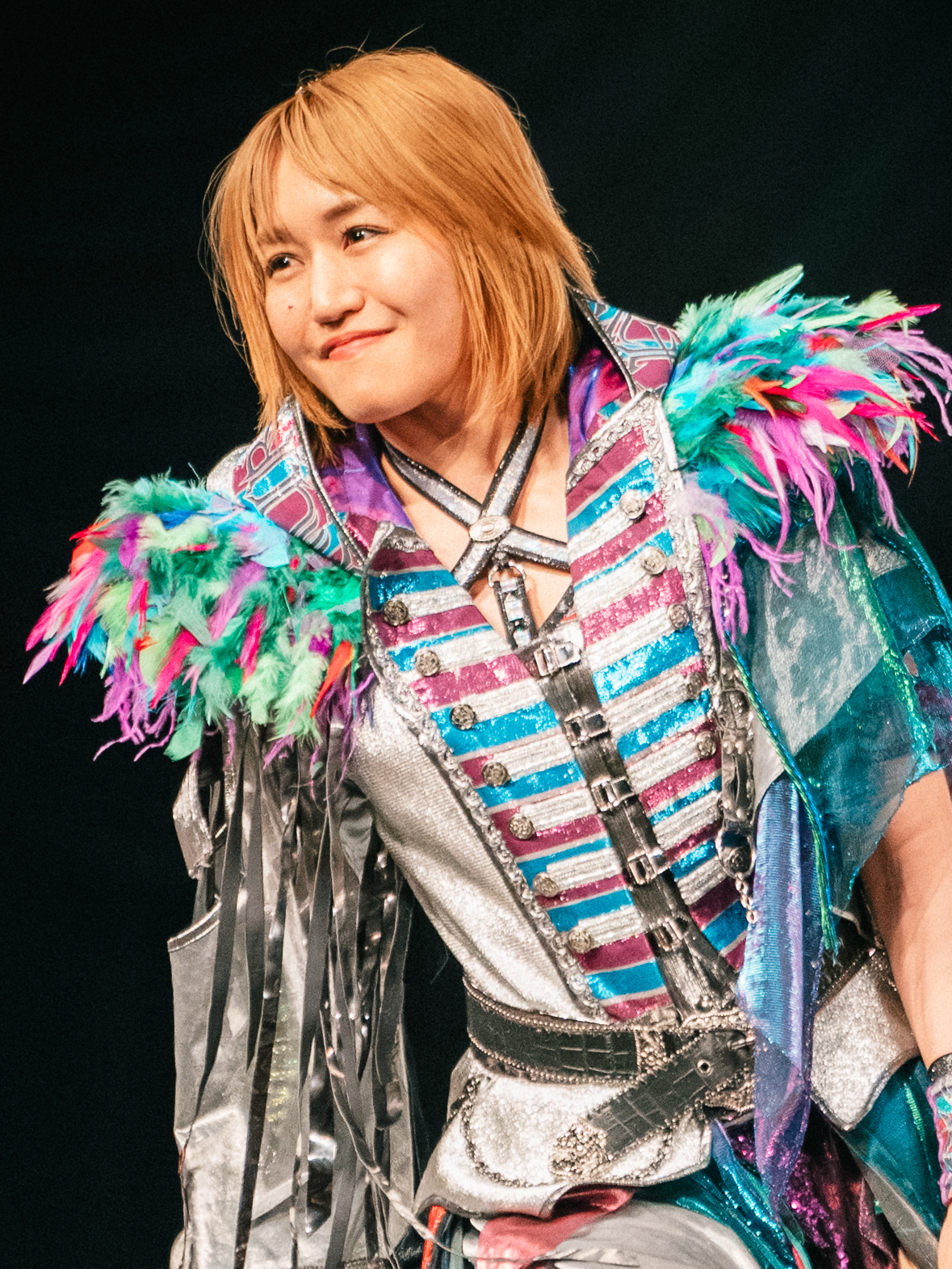
Syuri

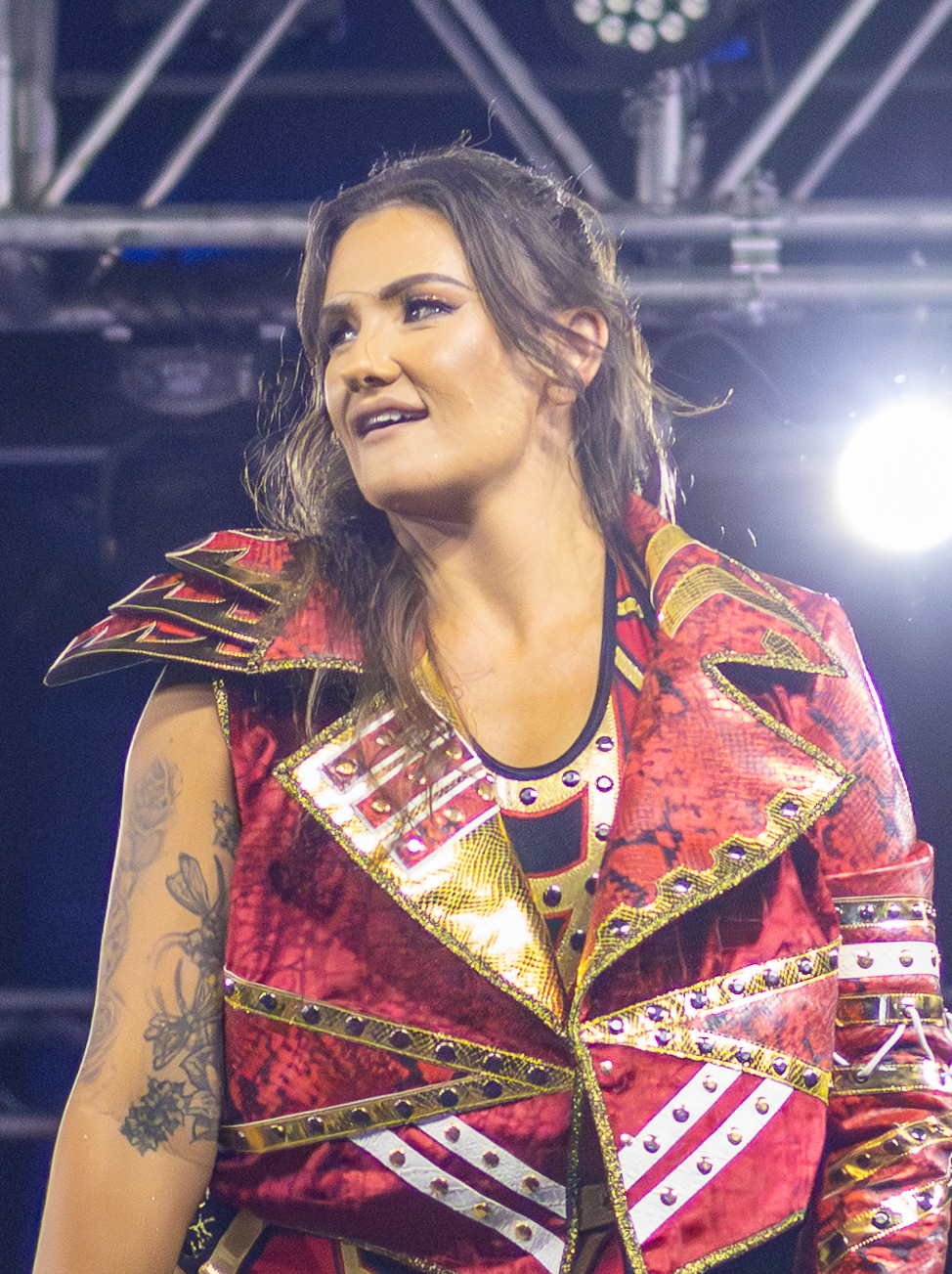
Alex Windsor

Ring name	Real name	Unit	Notes
Alex Windsor	Alice Walker	AEW; United Empire	Signed to All Elite Wrestling; Strong Women's Champion
Syuri	Syuri Kondo	God's Eye (L)	Signed to World Wonder Ring Stardom; IWGP Women's Champion

=== International rosters ===
==== Strong Live ====
Ring name	Real name	Unit	Notes
Alex Zayne	Alex Brandenberg	Unaffiliated	Freelancer
Atlantis Jr.	Undisclosed	CMLL	Signed to Consejo Mundial de Lucha Libre
Kevin Knight	Kevin Knight	Don Callis Family	Signed to All Elite Wrestling
Máscara Dorada	Undisclosed	CMLL	Signed to All Elite Wrestling and Consejo Mundial de Lucha Libre
Okumura	Shigeo Okumura	CMLL	Signed to Consejo Mundial de Lucha Libre
Rocky Romero	John Rivera	Don Callis Family	Vice President of Show and Talent Coordination; Producer
Soberano Jr.	Undisclosed	CMLL	Signed to Consejo Mundial de Lucha Libre
Último Guerrero	José Gutiérrez Hernández	CMLL	Signed to Consejo Mundial de Lucha Libre

==== Tamashii ====
Ring name	Real name	Unit	Notes
Magic Mark	Mark Tui	NJPW Tamashii	Trainer
Pretty Richie	Richard Mulu	NJPW Tamashii	Freelancer
TJ Illes	Unknown	NJPW Tamashii	Freelancer; NJPW TAMASHII Tag Team Champion
Tony Kozina	Anthony Kozina	NJPW Tamashii	Trainer
Trent Hooper	Unknown	NJPW Tamashii	Freelancer; NJPW TAMASHII Tag Team Champion

=== Developmental roster ===
==== Young Lions ====
Ring name	Real name	Unit	Notes
Daiki Nagai	Daiki Nagai	Unbound Co.	
Katsuya Murashima	Katsuya Murashima	Hontai	On learning excursion in Europe
Masatora Yasuda	Masatora Yasuda	Hontai	
Naoto Inoki	Naoto Inoki	Hontai	Yet to make his NJPW in-ring debut
Shion Obata	Shion Obata	Hontai	
Shoma Kato	Shoma Kato	Hontai	On learning excursion in Mexico with Consejo Mundial de Lucha Libre
Taisei Nakahara	Taisei Nakahara	Hontai	
Tatsuya Matsumoto	Tatsuya Matsumoto	Hontai	
Yushin Hatazawa	Yushin Hatazawa	Hontai	

== PUP list ==
NJPW has established a PUP (physically unable to perform) list for wrestlers who are currently out with a legitimate injury, and thus not able to wrestle.

Ring name	Real name	Unit	Reason
El Desperado	Kyosuke Mikami	Hontai	Spinal canal stenosis Hernia
Tomohiro Ishii	Tomohiro Ishii	Hontai	Neck injury

== Referees ==
Ring name	Real name	Notes
Kenta Sato	Kenta Sato	
Marty Asami	Marty Asami	
Red Shoes Unno	Hiroyuki Umino	Senior Referee
Taito Nakabayashi	Taito Nakabayashi	
Yuya Sakamoto	Yuya Sakamoto	

== Broadcast team ==
Ring name	Real name	Notes
Daisuke Takahashi	Daisuke Takahashi	Commentator
Haruo Murata	Haruo Murata	Commentator
Jushin Thunder Liger	Keiichi Yamada	Commentator; Trainer; IWGP Executive Committee Member
Katsuhiko Kanazawa	Katsuhiko Kanazawa	Commentator
Kazuo Yamazaki	Kazuo Yamazaki	Commentator; Trainer
Koki Yamazaki	Koki Yamazaki	Commentator
Makoto Abe	Makoto Abe	Ring Announcer
Miki Motoi	Miki Motoi	Commentator
Milano Collection A. T.	Akihito Sawafuji	Commentator; Producer
Shigeki Kiyono	Shigeki Kiyono	Commentator; Host of NJPW's Press Conferences
Shinji Yoshino	Shinji Yoshino	Commentator
Shinpei Nogami	Shinpei Nogami	Commentator
Souichi Shibata	Souichi Shibata	Commentator
Taisei Watanabe	Taisei Watanabe	Ring Announcer
Takuro Shibata	Takuro Shibata	Ring Announcer
Yuichi Tabata	Yuichi Tabata	Commentator

=== Foreign language ===
Ring name	Real name	Notes
Chris Charlton	Chris Charlton	English language color commentator Translator
Gino Gambino	Adam Kostovski	English language commentator
Walker Stewart	Walker Stewart	English language play-by-play commentator

== Other personnel ==
Ring name	Real name	Notes
Hiro Saito	Hiroyuki Saito	Trainer
Junji Hirata	Junji Hirata	Trainer
Manabu Nakanishi	Manabu Nakanishi	Producer
Masayuki Hayashi	Masayuki Hayashi	Doctor
Michael Craven	Michael Craven	General Manager; Writer for The Recount
Mima Shimoda	Mima Shimoda	Producer
Seiji Sakaguchi	Seiji Sakaguchi	Advisor; Founding Chairman of United Japan Pro-Wrestling
Takashi Iizuka	Takayuki Iizuka	Trainer
Takeshi Misawa	Takeshi Misawa	Medical Trainer
Tiger Hattori	Masao Hattori	Foreign Liaison Officer; IWGP Executive Committee Member
Tiger Mask	Yoshihiro Yamazaki	Trainer
Wataru Inoue	Wataru Inoue	Ambassador

=== Musical staff ===
Name	Notes
Julia Claris	Musician
Kazsin	Musician
May's	Band
No Name Tim	Music Producer; Audio Engineer; Audio Mixer
[Q]Brick	Band
Yonosuke Kitamura	Composer

=== Corporate staff ===
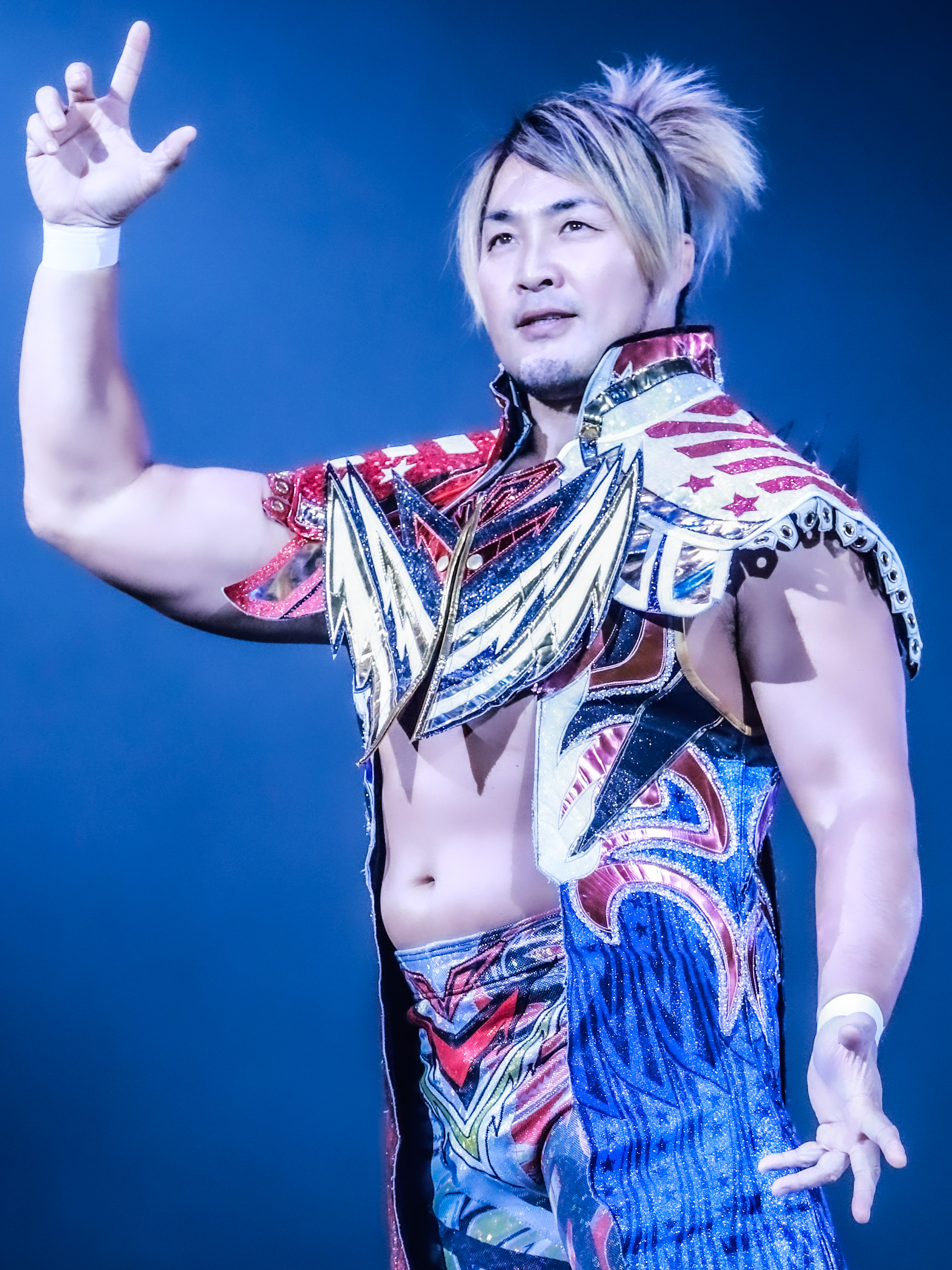
Hiroshi Tanahashi

Name	Notes
Hiroshi Tanahashi	President and Representative Director
Hitoshi Matsumoto	Executive Vice President; IWGP Executive Committee Member
Kaoru Mikumo	Vice Chairman of the Board; Board Director of TV Asahi Corporation
Keisuke Higuchi	Director; Deputy General Manager of Content Programming Division of TV Asahi Corporation
Mami Arai	Director; General Manager of Business Development Division of TV Asahi Corporation
Naoki Sugabayashi	Chairman of the Board; Executive Director of United Japan Pro-Wrestling; IWGP Executive Committee Member
Yasuo Okamoto	Director; Executive Vice President of CyberAgent
Yoshinori Saito	Auditor; Treasurer of TV Asahi Corporation

== See also ==
- List of current champions in New Japan Pro-Wrestling
- List of former New Japan Pro-Wrestling personnel
