= Yoshi Tatsu =

Japanese professional wrestler (born 1977)

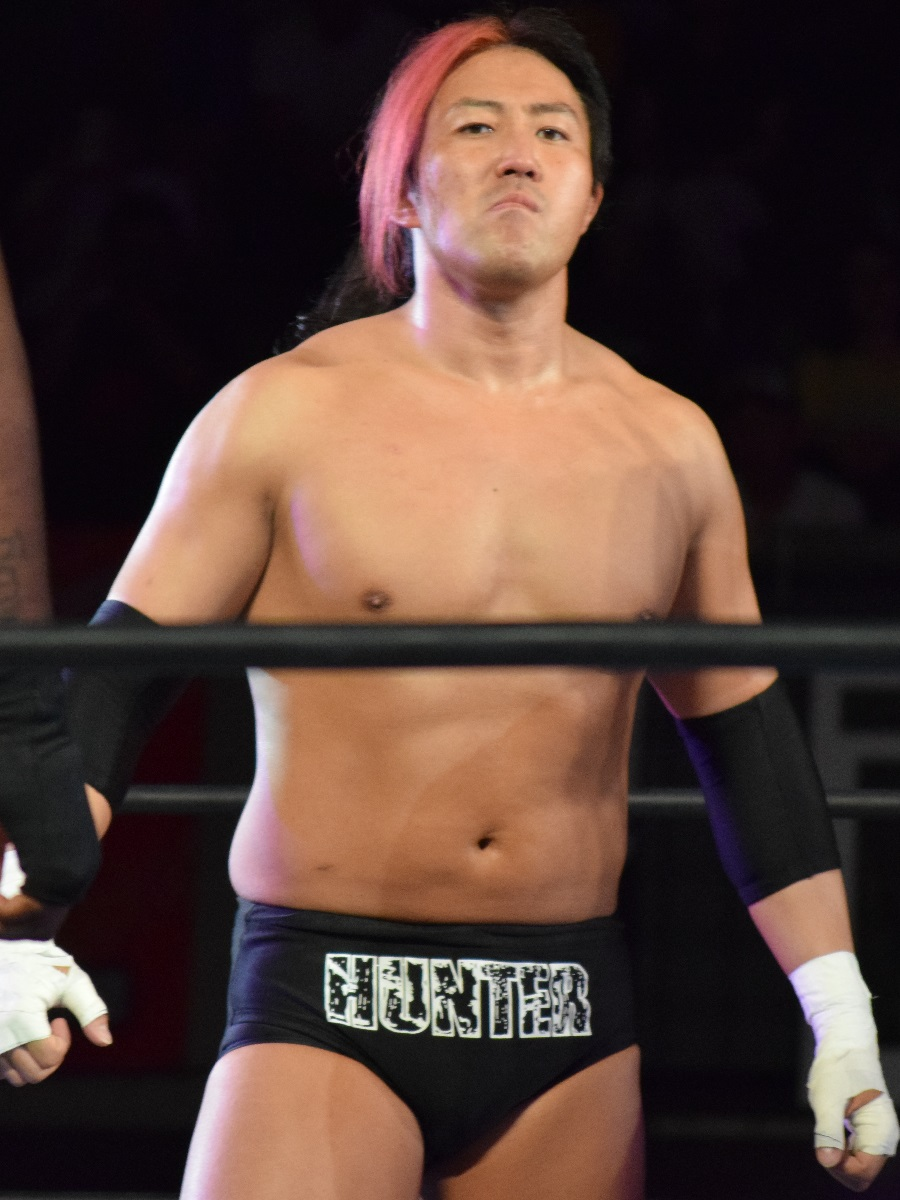
- Tatsu in 2016

Personal information
- Born: Naofumi Yamamoto; August 1, 1977 (age 49) Gifu, Gifu, Japan

Professional wrestling career
- Ring names: Naofumi Yamamoto; Yamamoto; Yoshi Tatsu; Yoshitatsu
- Billed height: 1.85 m (6 ft 1 in)
- Billed weight: 102 kg (225 lb)
- Billed from: Tokyo, Japan
- Trained by: Florida Championship Wrestling; Kotetsu Yamamoto; NJPW Dojo; Yuji Nagata
- Debut: October 12, 2002

Naofumi Yamamoto (山本 尚史, Yamamoto Naofumi; born August 1, 1977) is a Japanese professional wrestler, better known by the ring name Yoshi Tatsu.

Yamamoto started his professional wrestling career under his real name in October 2002 with New Japan Pro-Wrestling (NJPW), where he remained until 2007, when he signed with World Wrestling Entertainment (WWE). In 2009, Yamamoto left WWE's developmental territory to join the promotion's main roster under the ring name Yoshi Tatsu (ヨシ・タツ, Yoshi Tatsu). After his release from WWE in June 2014, Yamamoto returned to NJPW the following October, performing under the tweaked ring name Yoshitatsu (ヨシタツ, Yoshitatsu). Following his departure from NJPW in late 2017, Yamamoto became a freelancer, and started working most notably for All Japan Pro Wrestling (AJPW), who he signed full time for between 2020 and 2023.

== Professional wrestling career ==
=== New Japan Pro-Wrestling (2002–2007) ===
With a sports background in boxing and jujutsu, Yamamoto passed an audition held by New Japan Pro-Wrestling (NJPW) in September 2001 and began training professional wrestling at the promotion's dojo the following March. During his training, Yamamoto also travelled to Los Angeles to train at the local NJPW dojo. Yamamoto made his in-ring debut on October 12, 2002, facing Wataru Inoue in Korakuen Hall.

Initially Yamamoto worked low card matches for NJPW, normally on the losing side to gain ring experience. On December 27, 2003, Yamamoto lost to Ryusuke Taguchi in a chance at a match on NJPW's most prestigious show, the January 4 Dome Show Wrestling World. Yamamoto participated in the 2004 Young Lion Cup where he defeated Hirooki Goto, Akiya Anzawa, and Hiroshi Nagao to earn a total of six points, not enough to qualify for the finals. Yamamoto also participated in the 2005 Young Lion Cup where he only won one match, defeating Yujiro. In 2006, Yamamoto participated in his first G1 Climax tournament, losing all four matches. Yamamoto teamed up with Manabu Nakanishi to compete in the 2006 G1 Tag League, defeating Giant Bernard and Travis Tomko to earn their sole victory in the tournament. On January 8, 2006, Yamamoto and Osamu Nishimura defeated Toru Yano and a returning Togi Makabe. Over the summer of 2007 Yamamoto began teaming regularly with Hiroshi Tanahashi forming a team called "New Japan Dragons", earning a match for the IWGP Tag Team Championship against the then champions, Bernard and Tomko, albeit in a losing effort. For the 2007 G1 Tag League Yamamoto teamed up with Takashi Ilzuka, while they defeated three teams (Hirooki Goto and Milano Collection A.T., Togi Makabe and Toru Yano, and Giant Bernard and Travis Tomko); the team ended up in last place. On November 2, 2007 Yamamoto wrestled his last match for NJPW, teaming with his mentor Yuji Nagata in a losing effort against Tomohiro Ishii and Toru Yano.

=== World Wrestling Entertainment/WWE (2007–2014) ===
==== Florida Championship Wrestling (2007–2009) ====
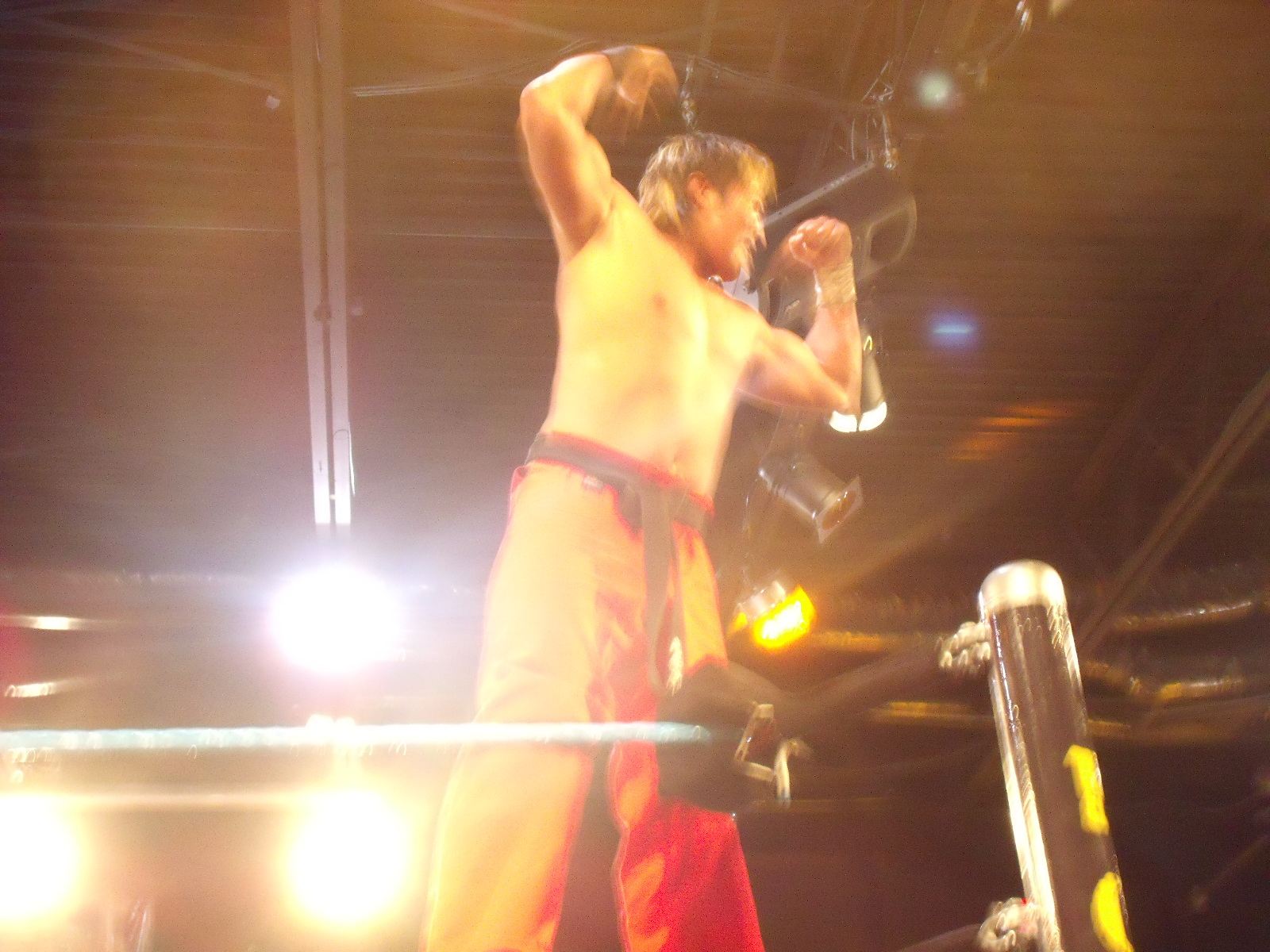
Tatsu in Florida Championship Wrestling in 2009

In late 2007, Yamamoto was signed by World Wrestling Entertainment (WWE) to a full-time contract, which meant that he had to relocate to the United States. He immediately was assigned to WWE's developmental territory Florida Championship Wrestling (FCW), to undergo assessment and training in the "WWE style" of wrestling. Initially he wrestled as Mr. Yamamoto, then simply as Yamamoto. He briefly teamed with Sheamus O'Shaunessy under the team name The Movers and the Shakers. Later on, he changed his ring name to Yoshitatsu, before tweaking the spelling to Yoshi Tatsu. Yoshitatsu is Yamamoto's father's given name.

==== Brand switches (2009–2011) ====
On June 30, 2009, Yamamoto joined the ECW brand under the ring name Yoshi Tatsu. He had his first match that night, defeating Shelton Benjamin, although he lost a rematch to Benjamin on the July 9 episode of ECW. On the October 20 episode of ECW, Tatsu defeated Zack Ryder to become number one contender for the ECW Championship, although he failed to win the championship the following week against Christian. On the December 22 episode of ECW, Yoshi Tatsu defeated Jack Swagger to earn a spot in the ECW Homecoming battle royal, the winner of which would challenge Christian for the ECW title at the Royal Rumble. On the January 12 episode of ECW, however, Tatsu was not able to win the battle royal when he was eliminated by Kane. At the Royal Rumble, Tatsu competed in his first Royal Rumble match, but was eliminated by John Cena. Tatsu then formed a tag team with Goldust and the duo became the number one contenders for the Unified WWE Tag Team Championship but failed in capturing the titles on the final episode of ECW.

After the ECW brand was discontinued, Tatsu made his debut on the Raw brand on the February 22, 2010 episode of Raw, where he teamed up with Evan Bourne and Kofi Kingston to defeat The Legacy (Randy Orton, Ted DiBiase, and Cody Rhodes), after Orton turned on his partners. Tatsu won a 26-man battle royal in the dark match to open WrestleMania XXVI by last eliminating Zack Ryder. In July 2010, Tatsu had a few backstage brawls with The Nexus, trying to help John Cena get rid of them, which he did not.

After months off WWE television, Tatsu returned on the November 11 episode of Superstars, defeating Zack Ryder. On the November 29 episode of Raw, Tatsu teamed with Mark Henry to defeat WWE Tag Team Champions Justin Gabriel and Heath Slater, after a distraction by John Cena. The following week on Raw, Tatsu and Henry received a shot at the titles in a fatal four-way elimination tag team match, which also included The Usos and Santino Marella and Vladimir Kozlov. They were the first team eliminated. On the February 14 episode of Raw, Maryse and Ted DiBiase were about to kiss, but Maryse instead kissed Tatsu. On the February 24 episode of Superstars, during the match between Daniel Bryan and DiBiase, Tatsu came out and gave Maryse flowers, which Maryse hit DiBiase with, allowing Bryan to defeat DiBiase. Tatsu failed at a chance to earn a World Heavyweight Championship shot in a 20-man number one contenders battle royal.

On April 26, Tatsu was drafted to the SmackDown brand as part of the 2011 supplemental draft. He only had two matches on SmackDown in 2011; a number one contenders battle royal for the World Heavyweight Championship and an "All I Want for Christmas" battle royal, the winner of which would receive one wish.

==== Last feuds (2011–2014) ====
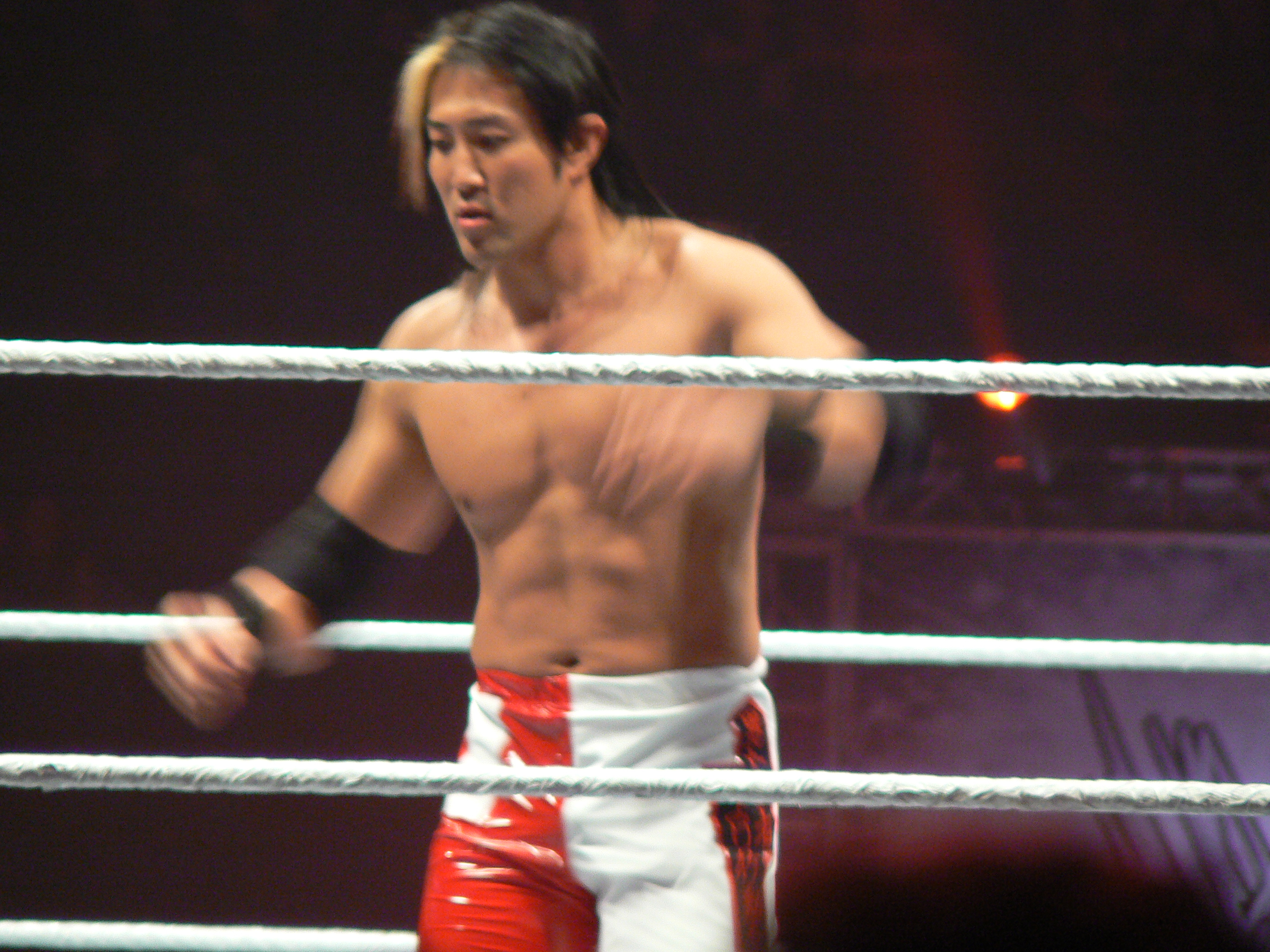
Tatsu in 2010

Tatsu was a WWE Pro for the fifth season of NXT, also known as NXT Redemption, and his Rookie was Byron Saxton. On the April 26 episode of NXT, Tatsu was attacked by Saxton after Tatsu cost his match against Lucky Cannon. This caused tension between the two until the May 17 episode of NXT, when Tatsu defeated Saxton. On the May 31 episode of NXT, Saxton was the second rookie eliminated.

Tatsu then began a feud with fellow NXT Pro Tyson Kidd, whose rookie was also eliminated, when Kidd broke Tatsu's toy figurine of himself and stole one of its legs. They traded wins during their feud, and Tatsu reclaimed the leg by winning a Necklace on a Pole match on the July 26 episode of NXT. After the match, Kidd assaulted Tatsu's right leg, taking him off NXT for over a month. However, over the next few weeks, the Kanji word for "pride" appeared on the TitanTron to distract Kidd during his matches – a message from Tatsu. He returned on the September 6 episode of NXT, where he debuted black tights emblazoned with Kanji characters and the Japanese flag, his small lock of blond hair dyed red and half his face painted. He defeated Kidd on that episode to end the feud. Tatsu later explained that his new look and wrestling style were because he wanted to better portray Japanese culture, Japanese pride and the aggressive style of Japanese wrestling. He said his face paint was a tribute to The Great Muta. Tatsu stopped wearing his face paint to the ring by October 2011. From December 2011, Tatsu formed an alliance with Trent Barreta to feud with Curt Hawkins and Tyler Reks. Both teams played pranks on each other; Tatsu was locked in a closet and Reks' hands were superglued to an Xbox controller. The feud ended when Hawkins and Reks defeated Barreta and Tatsu on the January 18 episode of NXT.

On the February 9, 2012 episode of Superstars, Tatsu defeated Johnny Curtis. This would be his last televised victory in WWE, as he lost the rest of his televised matches in 2012 and 2013, even on NXT, which in August 2012 had become WWE's re-branded developmental territory. On the January 23, 2013 episode of NXT, Tatsu and Percy Watson entered the NXT Tag Team Championship Tournament to crown the inaugural champions, but were defeated by The Wyatt Family (Luke Harper and Erick Rowan) in the first round. Tatsu continued sporadically wrestling on NXT throughout the rest of 2013 and 2014, but lost all his matches. In his final WWE pay-per-view appearance, Tatsu unsuccessfully competed in the Andre the Giant Memorial battle royal at WrestleMania XXX in April 2014. On June 12, 2014, Yamamoto was released from his WWE contract, along with ten other talents.

=== Independent circuit (2014) ===
On July 29, 2014, Yamamoto made his first post-WWE match at BELIEVE 77. At BELIEVE 79, Yamamoto defeated Aaron Epic to win the SCW Florida Heavyweight Championship, his first professional wrestling title (which he vacated on March 28, 2015 due to his neck injury). On September 20, 2014, Yamamoto made his debut for Chikara, losing to Ashley Remington via disqualification, following outside interference from Juan Francisco de Coronado.

=== Return to NJPW (2014–2017) ===
On October 13, 2014, at King of Pro-Wrestling, Yamamoto, billed as Yoshitatsu, returned to New Japan, attacking Jeff Jarrett when he interfered in the main event match and, in doing so, helped Hiroshi Tanahashi defeat A.J. Styles for the IWGP Heavyweight Championship. Yamamoto did not return to working under his real name due to being known better under the name Yoshi Tatsu, but he also could not continue working under his WWE name because of trademark issues, which led to the name's tweaked spelling. He was given the new gimmick of a "Bullet Club hunter", which saw him state that he had grown sick of seeing WWE and NXT employees wearing Bullet Club shirts and was now looking to eliminate the villainous stable from professional wrestling, starting with A.J. Styles. Yoshitatsu wrestled his return match on November 8 at Power Struggle, where he was defeated by Styles, following outside interference from Jarrett. Styles won after performing with his signature finisher, the Styles Clash. While performing the move, Yoshi Tatsu moved his head down before the point of impact with the mat. Instead of having his face slammed into the mat he took his weight, Styles' weight, and all of the force onto his neck. After the match, Jarrett hit Yoshitatsu with a guitar. On November 14, Yoshitatsu and Hiroshi Tanahashi announced they were forming a new tag team named "The World". The World was scheduled to take part in the 2014 World Tag League, but after their opening match on November 22, Yoshitatsu was forced to pull out of the tournament with a neck injury. On November 25, Yamamoto announced he had two broken bones in his neck, suffered presumably in his match with Styles when he botched the Styles Clash. Yamamoto had a halo installed in his skull, which he wore for the next three months. In May 2015, Yamamoto started training for a comeback at the Team Vision Gym in Orlando, Florida.

On January 4, 2016, Yoshitatsu returned as part of the English announcing team at Wrestle Kingdom 10 in Tokyo Dome. On March 22, NJPW announced that Yoshitatsu would wrestle his NJPW return match on April 10 at Invasion Attack 2016, where he, Hiroshi Tanahashi and Michael Elgin defeated Bullet Club's The Elite (Kenny Omega and The Young Bucks (Matt Jackson and Nick Jackson)) to win the NEVER Openweight 6-Man Tag Team Championship. Afterwards, Yoshitatsu announced he was forming a new stable named "Hunter Club" to oppose Bullet Club. However, neither Elgin nor Tanahashi accepted Yoshitatsu's invitation to join the stable, which led to Captain New Japan stepping up as the first member of the new group. Yoshitatsu then debuted a new gimmick, where he began mimicking Triple H, which included him adopting the Pedigree as his finishing move. Yoshitatsu, Elgin and Tanahashi made their first successful title defense on April 23 against the Bullet Club trio of Bad Luck Fale, Kenny Omega and Yujiro Takahashi. On May 3 at Wrestling Dontaku 2016, they lost the title back to Omega and The Young Bucks. On September 12, Yoshitatsu, upset with Captain New Japan's poor performances, announced a Twitter poll that would decide whether he would get to stay in Hunter Club. On September 25 at Destruction in Kobe, Yoshitatsu revealed the result of the poll and agreed to remove Captain New Japan from Hunter Club. This led to Captain attacking Yoshitatsu and aligning himself with Bullet Club. After starting a feud with Captain New Japan, now renamed "Bone Soldier", Yoshitatsu announced on November 5 that he had recruited Billy Gunn as his new Hunter Club partner for the 2016 World Tag League. Yoshitatsu and Gunn finished the tournament on December 8 with a record of three wins and four losses, failing to advance from their block, though Yoshitatsu managed to pin Bone Soldier in their final round-robin match. In April 2017, Yoshitatsu joined the Taguchi Japan stable.

=== Consejo Mundial de Lucha Libre (2017) ===
In February 2017, NJPW sent Yoshitatsu to their Mexican partner promotion Consejo Mundial de Lucha Libre (CMLL) for a tour. He debuted for the promotion on February 17.

=== All Japan Pro Wrestling (2017–2023) ===
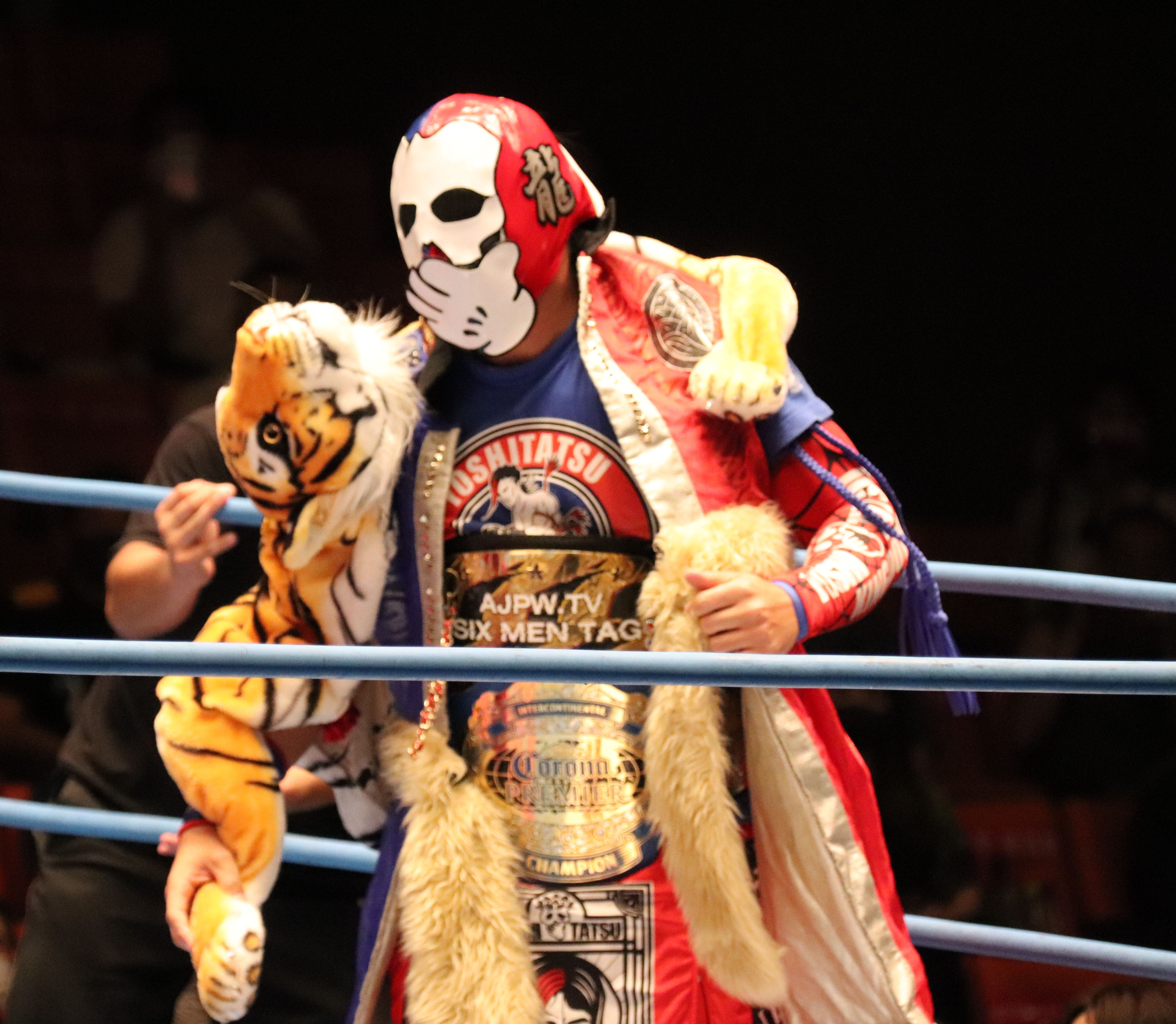
Yoshitatsu in 2021

On September 12, 2017, Yoshitatsu made his debut for All Japan Pro Wrestling (AJPW), entering the annual Ōdō Tournament and defeating Tajiri in his first round match. Six days later, he was eliminated from the tournament in the second round by Triple Crown Heavyweight Champion Kento Miyahara. On November 9, Yoshitatsu unsuccessfully challenged Joe Doering for the Triple Crown Heavyweight Championship. He entered the 2017 Real World Tag League with Miyahara and had a good showing, winning five matches, but was one short of a finals berth. On February 3, 2018, Yoshitatsu and Miyahara defeated Shuji Ishikawa and Suwama to win the World Tag Team Championship. Calling themselves Yoshiken, their reign lasted only 22 days, as they lost the belts to The Big Guns on February 25. In April, he entered his first Champion Carnival, posting three wins to finish fifth in block B. Challenging Ishikawa and Suwama for the World Tag Team Championship for a second time, Yoshiken were defeated on August 18.

On May 27, 2019, Yoshitatsu defeated Tajiri to win the Gaora TV Championship. Tatsu signed full time with All Japan on January 1, 2020, with the contract being announced at their first show of the year on January 2. After nine successful title defences and a record breaking 587 days as champion, Yoshitatsu lost the Gaora TV Championship to Jun Kasai in a tables, ladders and chairs match on January 3, 2021. Yoshitatsu would compete in a series "Different Style Fights", innovated by Antonio Inoki, these worked matches pit professional wrestlers against martial artists and have a focus on a more realistic style of pro-wrestling. His most notable match came on June 26 where he defeated former Oriental and Pacific Boxing Federation champion boxer turned mixed martial artist Yōsuke Nishijima. On July 22, he won the AJPW TV Six-Man Tag Team Championship with Carbell Ito and Seigo Tachibana from Tajiri, Yusuke Kodama and Hokuto Omori. They were forced to vacate the title after Carbell Ito suffered a fractured wrist on September 28 but Yoshitatsu and Tachibana would regain the titles on October 16 with Takayuki Ueki.

On December 31, 2023, at #ajpwMANIAx2023, he announced he was leaving AJPW.

=== DDT Pro-Wrestling (2024) ===
On January 3, 2024, Yoshi Tatsu made an appearance at the start of the D-Oh Grand Prix 2023 Final event where it was announced he would tour with DDT Pro-Wrestling starting January 5.

=== Pro Wrestling NOAH (2024–Present) ===
Yoshitatsu debuted on Noah on September 30 under a mask and weeks later created the stable Team 2000X with Jack Morris and Daga.

== Other media ==
As Tatsu, Yamamoto is featured as a playable superstar for the WWE SmackDown vs. Raw 2011, WWE '12 and WWE '13 (as DLC) video games. He was previously featured in King of Colosseum II and Wrestle Kingdom 2 under his real name.

== Personal life ==
Yamamoto is a graduate from Kokushikan University with a degree in political science. Yamamoto is also married and has a child.

== Championships and accomplishments ==
- All Japan Pro Wrestling
  - Gaora TV Championship (1 time)
  - AJPW TV Six-Man Tag Team Championship (2 times) – with Seigo Tachibana and Carbell Ito (1), Seigo Tachibana and Takayuki Ueki (1)
  - All Asia Tag Team Championship (2 times) – with Tajiri (1) and Atsushi Onita (1)
  - World Tag Team Championship (1 time) – with Kento Miyahara
- I Believe in Wrestling
  - SCW Florida Heavyweight Championship (1 time)
- New Japan Pro-Wrestling
  - NEVER Openweight 6-Man Tag Team Championship (1 time) – with Hiroshi Tanahashi and Michael Elgin
- Pro Wrestling Illustrated
  - Ranked No. 78 of the top 500 singles wrestlers in the PWI 500 in 2010
- Pro Wrestling Riot
  - PWR Championship (1 time)
- Uce Wrestling
  - Corona Premier Intercontinental Championship (1 time)

== Mixed martial arts record ==
Professional record breakdown
1 match	0 wins	1 loss
By knockout	0	0
By submission	0	1
By decision	0	0

Res.	Record	Opponent	Method	Event	Date	Round	Time	Location	Notes
Loss	0–1	Hiroyuki Ota	Submission (armbar)	TFC – Titan Fighting Championship 3	April 30, 2001	1	3:44	Tokyo, Japan	
