= Young Lion Cup =

Professional wrestling tournament

The Young Lion Cup (ヤングライオン杯, Yangu Raionhai) is an infrequent professional wrestling tournament promoted by New Japan Pro-Wrestling (NJPW) as a means of showcasing the younger talent on their roster. The tournament is the successor to the Karl Gotch Cup that NJPW promoted in the 1970s. NJPW has held the tournament eleven times since 1985. After the 2005 tournament, NJPW did not hold another Young Lion Cup for 12 years, until reviving the tournament in 2017, 2019 and again in 2026.

The Young Lion Cup is a round-robin tournament in the same style as NJPW's annual G1 Climax tournament. Wrestlers traditionally earn two points for a victory, one point for any sort of draw and zero points for a loss. In some years, the two wrestlers with the most points at the end of the round-robin tournament would then face off in a singles match for the Young Lion Cup trophy, while in other years, the wrestler with the most points would be declared the winner. The winners of the Young Lion Cup would also be rewarded with a learning excursion overseas. It was held as a single-elimination tournament in 2026.

In 2020, another tournament featuring young lions, Lion's Break Crown, was organized by NJPW, this time as a single-elimination tournament.

== Winners ==
| Tournament | Year | Winner | Total won | Reference |
|---|---|---|---|---|
| Young Lion Cup | 1985 | Shunji Kosugi | 1 | |
| Young Lion Cup | 1986 | Keiichi Yamada | 1 | |
| Young Lion Cup | 1987 | Masahiro Chono | 1 | |
| Young Lion Cup | 1989 | Naoki Sano | 1 | |
| Young Lion Cup | 1993 | Hiroyoshi Yamamoto | 1 | |
| Young Lion Cup | 1994 | Satoshi Kojima | 1 | |
| Young Lion Cup | 1995 | Manabu Nakanishi | 1 | |
| Young Lion Cup | 1996 | Tokimitsu Ishizawa | 1 | |
| Young Lion Cup | 2000 | Kenzo Suzuki | 1 | |
| Young Lion Cup | 2004 | Ryusuke Taguchi | 1 | |
| Young Lion Cup | 2005 | Hirooki Goto | 1 | |
| Young Lion Cup | 2017 | Katsuya Kitamura | 1 | |
| Young Lion Cup | 2019 | Karl Fredericks | 1 | |
| Young Lion Cup | 2026 | Katsuya Murashima | 1 | |

== 1985 ==
Final standings
| Shunji Kosugi | 32.5 |
| Keiichi Yamada | 32.5 |
| Tatsutoshi Goto | 32.5 |
| Naoki Sano | 25 |
| Keiji Muto | 22.5 |
| Hirokazu Hata | 15 |
| Masahiro Chono | 12.5 |
| Shinya Hashimoto | 7.5 |
| Yuji Funaki | 0 |

| Final |
| Keiichi Yamada | Pin |
| Shunji Kosugi | 21:00 |

== 1986 ==
Final standings
| Keiichi Yamada | Winner |
| Tatsutoshi Goto | Runner up |
| Akira Nogami | Unknown |
| Hirokazu Hata | Unknown |
| Masahiro Chono | Unknown |
| Masaharu Funaki | Unknown |
| Shinya Hashimoto | Unknown |
| Naoki Sano | Unknown |

| Final |
| Keiichi Yamada | Pin |
| Tatsutoshi Goto | 12:49 |

== 1987 ==
Final standings
| Masahiro Chono | 38 |
| Shinya Hashimoto | 37 |
| Yuji Funaki | 30 |
| Akira Nogami | 25 |
| Yoji Anjo | 20 |
| Tatsuo Nakano | 20 |
| Kenichi Oya | 5 |
| Osamu Matsuda | 5 |
| Akira Katayama | 5 |

| Young Lion Cup | Chono | Hashimoto | Funaki | Nogami | Anjo | Nakano | Oya | Matsuda | Katayama |
|---|---|---|---|---|---|---|---|---|---|
| Chono | X | Draw (20:00) | Funaki (11:49) | Chono (11:02) | Chono (9:35) | Chono (9:08) | Chono (9:41) | Chono (8:24) | Chono (9:41) |
| Hashimoto | Draw (20:00) | X | Hashimoto (11:36) | Hashimoto (8:52) | Hashimoto (7:48) | Hashimoto (8:52) | Hashimoto (8:19) | Hashimoto (8:23) | Hashimoto (11:33) |
| Funaki | Funaki (11:49) | Hashimoto (11:36) | X | Nogami (10:32) | Funaki (15:04) | Funaki (5:51) | Funaki (9:26) | Funaki (10:27) | Funaki (9:13) |
| Nogami | Chono (11:02) | Hashimoto (8:52) | Nogami (10:32) | X | Anjo (??:??) | Nogami (9:42) | Nogami (8:57) | Nogami (11:17) | Nogami (7:44) |
| Anjo | Chono (9:35) | Hashimoto (7:48) | Funaki (15:04) | Anjo (??:??) | X | Nakano (10:24) | Anjo (11:38) | Anjo (11:05) | Anjo (7:54) |
| Nakano | Chono (9:08) | Hashimoto (8:52) | Funaki (5:51) | Nogami (9:42) | Nakano (10:24) | X | Nakano (8:22) | Nakano (7:23) | Nakano (6:37) |
| Oya | Chono (9:41) | Hashimoto (8:19) | Funaki (9:26) | Nogami (8:57) | Anjo (11:38) | Nakano (8:22) | X | Matsuda (9:26) | Oya (11:35) |
| Matsuda | Chono (8:24) | Hashimoto (8:23) | Funaki (10:27) | Nogami (11:17) | Anjo (11:05) | Nakano (7:23) | Matsuda (9:26) | X | Katayama (11:16) |
| Katayama | Chono (9:41) | Hashimoto (11:33) | Funaki (9:13) | Nogami (7:44) | Anjo (7:54) | Nakano (6:37) | Oya (11:35) | Katayama (11:16) | X |

| Final |
| Masahiro Chono | Pin |
| Shinya Hashimoto | 14:11 |

== 1989 ==
Final standings
| Naoki Sano | Winner |
| Hiro Saito | Runner up |
| Norio Honaga | Unknown |
| Hirokazu Hata | Unknown |
| Tatsutoshi Goto | Unknown |
| Takayuki Iizuka | Unknown |
| Kuniaki Kobayashi | Unknown |
| Osamu Kido | Unknown |

| Final |
| Naoki Sano | Pin |
| Hiro Saito | 10:43 |

== 1993 ==
Final standings
| Osamu Nishimura | 7 |
| Hiroyoshi Yamamoto | 6 |
| Manabu Nakanishi | 5 |
| Satoshi Kojima | 4 |
| Yuji Nagata | 3 |
| Shinjiro Otani | 3 |
| Tokimitsu Ishizawa | 2 |
| Tatsuhito Takaiwa | 0 |

| Results | Ishizawa | Kojima | Nagata | Nakanishi | Nishimura | Otani | Takaiwa | Yamamoto |
|---|---|---|---|---|---|---|---|---|
| Ishizawa | X | Kojima (8:44) | Ishizawa (7:37) | Nakanishi (7:31) | Nishimura (9:03) | Otani (9:57) | Ishizawa (5:57) | Yamamoto (11:35) |
| Kojima | Kojima (8:44) | X | Nagata (9:05) | Nakanishi (9:44) | Nishimura (9:59) | Kojima (11:13) | Kojima (8:37) | Kojima (11:00) |
| Nagata | Ishizawa (7:37) | Nagata (9:05) | X | Nakanishi (10:59) | Nishimura (11:19) | Nagata (10:33) | Nagata (9:55) | Yamamoto (10:59) |
| Nakanishi | Nakanishi (7:31) | Nakanishi (9:44) | Nakanishi (10:59) | X | Nishimura (8:47) | Nakanishi (8:35) | Nakanishi (9:00) | Yamamoto (13:02) |
| Nishimura | Nishimura (9:03) | Nishimura (9:59) | Nishimura (11:19) | Nishimura (8:47) | X | Otani (9:30) | Nishimura (5:52) | Yamamoto (13:12) |
| Otani | Otani (9:57) | Kojima (11:13) | Nagata (10:33) | Nakanishi (8:35) | Otani (9:30) | X | Otani (9:13) | Yamamoto (10:27) |
| Takaiwa | Ishizawa (5:57) | Kojima (8:37) | Nagata (9:55) | Nakanishi (9:00) | Nishimura (5:52) | Otani (9:13) | X | Yamamoto (11:03) |
| Yamamoto | Yamamoto (11:35) | Kojima (11:00) | Yamamoto (10:59) | Yamamoto (13:02) | Yamamoto (13:12) | Yamamoto (10:27) | Yamamoto (11:03) | X |

| Final |
| 1 | Osamu Nishimura | Pin |
| 2 | Hiroyoshi Yamamoto | 12:23 |

== 1994 ==
The 1994 Young Lion Cup featured a league with at least four wrestlers, although more may have participated. The four confirmed participants were Satoshi Kojima, Manabu Nakanishi, Nobukazu Hirai from WAR, and Tatsuhito Takaiwa. The league scores remain unclear but Kojima and Nakanishi qualified for the finals where Kojima defeated Nakanishi by submission.

Final standings
| Satoshi Kojima | Winner |
| Manabu Nakanishi | Runner up |
| Nobukazu Hirai | Unknown |
| Tatsuhito Takaiwa | Unknown |

== 1995 ==
The 1995 Young Lion Cup featured a league with at least six participants, although more may have participated. The confirmed participants were Manabu Nakanishi, Yuji Nagata, Yuki Ishikawa from Pro Wrestling Fujiwara Gumi, Tokimitsu Ishizawa, Tatsuhito Takaiwa, and Shinjiro Otani. The final league scores remain unclear but Nakanishi and Nagata both qualified for the final match, this was the second time Nakanishi had made it to the main event. In the finals Nakanishi defeated Nagata to claim the Young Lion Cup trophy.

Final standings
| Manabu Nakanishi | Winner |
| Yuji Nagata | Runner up |
| Yuki Ishikawa | Unknown |
| Tokimitsu Ishizawa | Unknown |
| Tatsuhito Takaiwa | Unknown |
| Shinjiro Otani | Unknown |

== 1996 ==
Tokimitsu Ishizawa defeated Yuji Nagata by pinfall (12:27)

== 2000 ==
NJPW brought back the Young Lion Cup in 2000 with a round-robin tournament that took place between April 14 and May 5, 2000 during NJPW's "Strong Energy II 2000" tour. The tournament featured five rookies from NJPW, Shinya Makabe, Kenzo Suzuki, Wataru Inoue, Katsuyori Shibata and Hiroshi Tanahashi as well as Masakazu Fukuda from the G-EGGS promotion. The tournament was marred by a tragedy on the first night when Masakazu Fukuda was hurt by a flying elbow smash from Shibata. Following the blow he collapsed on the mat and was taken to the hospital. He died five days later from an internal brain hemorrhage. The rest of the tournament was dedicated to Fukuda's memory. Both Shinya Makabe and Kenzo Suzuki remained undefeated after the first four rounds, qualifying them for the final before they had even wrestled the final match of the league. On April 30, 2000 Makabe defeated Suzuki, making him the only undefeated wrestler in the tournament. On May 5, 2000, during Wrestling Dontaku 2000, Kenzo Suzuki defeated Makabe to win the 2000 Young Lion Cup.

Final standings
| Shinya Makabe | 10 |
| Kenzo Suzuki | 8 |
| Katsuyori Shibata | 6 |
| Hiroshi Tanahashi | 4 |
| Wataru Inoue | 2 |
| Masakazu Fukuda | 0 |

| Young Lion Cup | Fukuda | Inoue | Makabe | Shibata | Suzuki | Tanahashi |
|---|---|---|---|---|---|---|
| Fukuda | X | Inoue (Forfeit) | Makabe (Forfeit) | Shibata (Forfeit) | Suzuki (Forfeit) | Tanahashi (Forfeit) |
| Inoue | Inoue (Forfeit) | X | Makabe | Shibata | Suzuki | Tanahashi |
| Makabe | Makabe (Forfeit) | Makabe | X | Makabe | Makabe | Makabe |
| Shibata | Shibata (Forfeit) | Shibata | Makabe | X | Suzuki | Shibata |
| Suzuki | Suzuki (Forfeit) | Suzuki | Makabe | Suzuki | X | Suzuki |
| Tanahashi | Tanahashi (Forfeit) | Tanahashi | Makabe | Shibata | Suzuki | X |

| Final |
| Shinya Makabe | Pin |
| Kenzo Suzuki | 15:08 |

== 2004 ==
Ryusuke Taguchi defeated Kazuya Yuasa by pinfall (11:20).

== 2005 ==
The 2005 Young Lion Cup was the tenth tournament held by NJPW and ran from to March 3 to March 23, 2005. The league matches took place during NJPW's "Big Fight Series 2005" tour and the final was on their NJPW "Nexess V" show. The tournament was scheduled to feature seven wrestlers but Tommy Williams was injured and had to withdraw from the competition without wrestling a single match, forfeiting all matches. The tournament also featured Naofumi Yamamoto, Yujiro, Hiroshi Nagao and Akiya Anzawa, in addition to the top two point scores Hirooki Goto (9 points) and Hiroyuki Ito (11 points). In the league Ito wrestled to a draw against Goto and won the other five matches, making him the only undefeated participant. On March 23, 2005, Hirooki Goto defeated Hiroyuki Ito to win the 2005 Young Lion Cup.

Final standings
| Hiroyuki Ito | 11 |
| Hirooki Goto | 9 |
| Akiya Anzawa | 8 |
| Hiroshi Nagao | 6 |
| Yujiro | 4 |
| Naofumi Yamamoto | 4 |
| Tommy Williams (withdrew) | 0 |

| Young Lion Cup | Anzawa | Goto | Ito | Nagao | Williams | Yamamoto | Yujiro |
|---|---|---|---|---|---|---|---|
| Anzawa | X | Anzawa (08:51) | Ito (07:59) | Anzawa (07:42) | Anzawa (Forfeit) | Anzawa (07:16) | Yujiro (10:04) |
| Goto | Anzawa (08:51) | X | Draw (20:00) | Goto (06:03) | Goto (Forfeit) | Goto (05:53) | Goto (07:19) |
| Ito | Ito (07:59) | Draw (20:00) | X | Ito (03:54) | Ito (Forfeit) | Ito (06:56) | Nagao (08:47) |
| Nagao | Anzawa (07:42) | Goto (06:03) | Ito (03:54) | X | Nagao (Forfeit) | Nagao (09:02) | Yamamoto (06:05) |
| Williams | Anzawa (Forfeit) | Goto (Forfeit) | Ito (Forfeit) | Nagao (Forfeit) | X | Yamamoto (Forfeit) | Yujiro (Forfeit) |
| Yamamoto | Anzawa (07:16) | Goto (05:53) | Yamamoto (06:05) | Nagao (09:02) | Yamamoto (Forfeit) | X | Yamamoto (06:05) |
| Yujiro | Yujiro (10:04) | Goto (07:19) | Ito (06:56) | Nagao (08:47) | Yujiro (Forfeit) | Yamamoto (06:05) | X |

| Final |
| Hiroyuki Ito | Pin |
| Hirooki Goto | 9:55 |

== 2017 ==
After his match at the Lion's Gate Project 7 event on July 4, 2017, Yuji Nagata proposed bringing back the Young Lion Cup. On September 26, NJPW officially announced the revival of the tournament after 12 years. The round-robin tournament started on October 12 at Lion's Gate Project 8 and concluded on December 21 at Lion's Gate Project 10, and included six wrestlers who debuted in 2016 and 2017. The tournament was dedicated to the memory of Kotetsu Yamamoto, who served as the head of the NJPW Dojo.

Final standings
| Katsuya Kitamura | 10 |
| Hirai Kawato | 8 |
| Tomoyuki Oka | 6 |
| Shota Umino | 4 |
| Ren Narita | 1 |
| Tetsuhiro Yagi | 1 |

| Young Lion Cup | Kawato | Kitamura | Narita | Oka | Umino | Yagi |
|---|---|---|---|---|---|---|
| Kawato | X | Kitamura (4:12) | Kawato (7:14) | Kawato (5:35) | Kawato (8:27) | Kawato (6:43) |
| Kitamura | Kitamura (4:12) | X | Kitamura (5:35) | Kitamura (11:20) | Kitamura (10:04) | Kitamura (8:32) |
| Narita | Kawato (7:14) | Kitamura (5:35) | X | Oka (13:22) | Umino (6:08) | Draw (15:00) |
| Oka | Kawato (5:35) | Kitamura (11:20) | Oka (13:22) | X | Oka (10:50) | Oka (7:13) |
| Umino | Kawato (8:27) | Kitamura (10:04) | Umino (6:08) | Oka (10:50) | X | Umino (7:54) |
| Yagi | Kawato (6:43) | Kitamura (8:32) | Draw (15:00) | Oka (7:13) | Umino (7:54) | X |

== 2019 ==
The 2019 Young Lion Cup was announced on August 27 and was held on the Destruction tour throughout September. It featured 8 participants: 4 from the New Japan Dojo, 3 from the Los Angeles Dojo, and 1 from the Fale Dojo. 2 competitors also competed in the 2017 tournament. Karl Fredericks won with 12 points.

Final standings
| Karl Fredericks | 12 |
| Shota Umino | 10 |
| Ren Narita | 10 |
| Alex Coughlin | 8 |
| Clark Connors | 8 |
| Yota Tsuji | 4 |
| Michael Richards | 2 |
| Yuya Uemura | 2 |

| Young Lion Cup | Uemura | Tsuji | Umino | Narita | Richards | Coughlin | Connors | Fredericks |
|---|---|---|---|---|---|---|---|---|
| Uemura | X | Tsuji (8:50) | Umino (6:53) | Narita (8:35) | Richards (8:47) | Coughlin (7:49) | Uemura (9:31) | Fredericks (6:12) |
| Tsuji | Tsuji (8:50) | X | Umino (7:34) | Narita (7:49) | Tsuji (6:44) | Coughlin (10:12) | Connors (7:43) | Fredericks (7:23) |
| Umino | Umino (6:53) | Umino (7:34) | X | Umino (9:09) | Umino (8:00) | Umino (8:14) | Connors (6:50) | Fredericks (7:17) |
| Narita | Narita (8:35) | Narita (7:49) | Umino (9:09) | X | Narita (7:18) | Narita (7:49) | Connors (7:25) | Narita (7:06) |
| Richards | Richards (8:47) | Tsuji (6:44) | Umino (8:00) | Narita (7:18) | X | Coughlin (6:13) | Connors (7:09) | Fredericks (6:12) |
| Coughlin | Coughlin (7:49) | Coughlin (10:12) | Umino (8:14) | Narita (7:49) | Coughlin (6:13) | X | Coughlin (7:53) | Fredericks (8:01) |
| Connors | Uemura (9:31) | Connors (7:43) | Connors (6:50) | Connors (7:25) | Connors (7:09) | Coughlin (7:53) | X | Fredericks (7:06) |
| Fredericks | Fredericks (6:12) | Fredericks (7:23) | Fredericks (7:17) | Narita (7:06) | Fredericks (6:12) | Fredericks (8:01) | Fredericks (7:06) | X |

== 2026 ==
The 2026 Young Lion Cup was announced on January 6 and was held on the Road to the New Beginning tour throughout that January culminating on February 1.. This was the first Young Lion Cup to be held as a single-elimination tournament. It featured six participants: 5 from the New Japan Dojo and 1 from the LA Dojo.

1st round Road to the New Beginning: Night 1 January 19, 2026
Masatora Yasuda | Submission
Tatsuya Matsumoto | 8:33
Daiki Nagai | Disqualification
Zane Jay | 7:19

Semifinals; Road to the New Beginning: Night 2 January 20, 2026
Shoma Kato | Submission
Masatora Yasuda | 6:55
Katsuya Murashima | Submission
Daiki Nagai | 9:19

Final; Road to the New Beginning: Night 3 February 1, 2026
Shoma Kato | 11:15
Katsuya Murashima | Submission
