= Akiya Anzawa =

Japanese retired professional wrestler

Personal information
- Born: 9 January 1981 (age 45) Kariwa, Niigata, Japan

Professional wrestling career
- Ring name: Akiya Anzawa
- Billed height: 1.75 m (5 ft 9 in)
- Billed weight: 88 kg (194 lb)
- Trained by: Animal Hamaguchi; NJPW Dojo
- Debut: 21 September 2003
- Retired: August 2006

Akiya Anzawa (born 9 January 1981) is a Japanese retired professional wrestler. Anzawa would spend his entire professional wrestling career, competing for New Japan Pro-Wrestling (NJPW) on mainly the mid-card. Akiya is the brother of professional wrestler Taku Anzawa.

== Professional wrestling career ==
Akiya has a background in Sports as he competed in Judo, a type of Mixed martial arts. He began training in the NJPW Dojo as a "Young Lion" to become a professional wrestler. He took lessons from Animal Hamaguci.

=== New Japan Pro Wrestling (2003–2006) ===
Akiya's work as a Young Lion in training would become noticed by NJPW Officials. Anzawa would then make his professional debut on 21 September 2003 at an NJPW Road to Ultimate Crush show, being televised. He lost to Ryusuke Taguchi and after the match he shook hands with Taguchi to show a sign of respect. He would win his first match days after against fellow Young Lion, Hiroshi Nagao at a house show. The two wrestlers began trading victories against each other.

He would compete in both the 2004 and 2005 Young Lion Cups. He would not score enough points to make it to the finals in both events.

In 2004, Akiya, Katsuyori Shibata and Hirooki Goto formed a stable named "Shibata Kenka Michi". The stable lasted a couple of months before being disbanded. Akiya would briefly feud with Goto and compete against Shibata. In October 2004, Akiya would lose to Katsuhiko Nakajima in the Young Lion Toukon Tournament.

In 2005, Anzawa competed in the Best of the Super Juniors XII but would not score enough points to win the tournament.

Anzawa competed in his last match when he tag teamed with Koji Kanemoto & Tiger Mask to face off against Gedo, Jado and Minoru in January 2006 at the NJPW 2006 Fan Thanksgiving Day event.

=== Retirement ===
In early August 2006. Akiya Anzawa announced his retirement from professional wrestling as a whole. He now lives in Niigata with his family.

== See also ==
- List of New Japan Pro Wrestling personnel
- Wrestling in Japan
