= Stardom New Blood 17 =

2024 World Wonder Ring Stardom event

New Blood 17
- Promotion: World Wonder Ring Stardom
- Date: December 26, 2024
- City: Tokyo, Japan
- Venue: New Pier Hall
- Attendance: 215

Event chronology
← Previous; Historic X-Over 2	Next → Dream Queendom

New Blood chronology
← Previous; New Blood West 2	Next → New Blood 18

Stardom New Blood 17 (スターダム ニュー ブラッド 17, Sutādamu nyū Buraddo 17) was a professional wrestling event promoted by World Wonder Ring Stardom. The event took place on December 26, 2024, in Tokyo, Japan at the New Pier Hall.

Six matches were contested at the event. The main event saw Rice Or Bread (Waka Tsukiyama and Hanako) defeat Devil Princess (Rina and Azusa Inaba) to win the New Blood Tag Team Championship.

== Production ==
=== Background ===
"New Blood" is a series of events that mainly focus on matches where rookie wrestlers, usually with three or fewer years of in-ring experience, evolve. Besides wrestlers from Stardom, various superstars from multiple promotions of the Japanese independent scene are invited to compete in bouts that are usually going under the stipulation of singles or tag team matches.

The show featured professional wrestling matches that result from scripted storylines, where wrestlers portray villains, heroes, or less distinguishable characters in the scripted events that build tension and culminate in a wrestling match or series of matches.

=== Event ===
The entire event was broadcast live on Stardom's YouTube channel. In the first bout, Kohaku defeated Matoi Hamabe in singles competition. Next up, Tomoka Inaba, Hina and Ranna Yagami picked up a win over World Woman Pro-Wrestling Diana's Himiko, Mizuki Kato and Yuma Makoto in six-woman tag team competition. The third bout saw Tam Nakano and Yuna Mizumori outmatching Sumika Yanagawa and Misa Kagura in tag team action. Next up, Honoka defeated Rian in singles competition. In the semi main event, Saori Anou, Aya Sakura and Sayaka Kurara defeated Evolution's Chi Chi, Zones and Soy. After the bout concluded, Sakura challenged Chi Chi to a match for the latter's Sendai Girls Junior Championship on further notice.

In the main event, Waka Tsukiyama and Hanako defeated Rina and Azusa Inaba to win the New Blood Tag Team Championship, ending the latter team's reign at 156 days and two defenses.

== Results ==
No.	Results	Stipulations	Times
1	Kohaku defeated Matoi Hamabe	Singles match	9:30
2	God's Eye (Tomoka Inaba, Hina and Ranna Yagami) defeated Himiko, Mizuki Kato and Yuma Makoto	Six-woman tag team match	11:48
3	Cosmic Angels (Tam Nakano and Yuna Mizumori) defeated Sumika Yanagawa and Misa Kagura	Tag team match	14:47
4	Honoka defeated Rian	Singles match	10:03
5	Cosmic Angels (Saori Anou, Aya Sakura and Sayaka Kurara) defeated Chi Chi, Zones and Soy	Six-woman tag team match	14:20
6	Rice Or Bread (Waka Tsukiyama and Hanako) defeated Devil Princess (Rina and Azusa Inaba) (c)	Tag team match for the New Blood Tag Team Championship	17:41
(c) / – the champion(s) heading into the match
