= Stardom New Blood West 2 =

2024 World Wonder Ring Stardom event

New Blood West 2
- Promotion: World Wonder Ring Stardom
- Date: November 16, 2024
- City: Osaka, Japan
- Venue: Azalea Taisho Hall
- Attendance: 246

Event chronology
← Previous; 2024 Goddesses of Stardom Tag League	Next → Historic X-Over 2

New Blood chronology
← Previous; New Blood 16	Next → New Blood 17

Stardom New Blood West 2 (スターダム ニュー ブラッド ウェスト 2, Sutādamu nyū Buraddo u~esuto 1) was a professional wrestling event promoted by World Wonder Ring Stardom. The event took place on November 16, 2024, in Osaka, Japan at the Azalea Taisho Hall.

Five matches were contested at the event. The main event saw Devil Princess (Rina and Azusa Inaba) successfully retain the New Blood Tag Team Championship against God's Eye (Lady C and Ranna Yagami).

== Production ==
=== Background ===
"New Blood" is a series of events that mainly focus on matches where rookie wrestlers, usually with three or fewer years of in-ring experience, evolve. Besides wrestlers from Stardom, various superstars from multiple promotions of the Japanese independent scene are invited to compete in bouts that are usually going under the stipulation of singles or tag team matches.

The show featured professional wrestling matches that result from scripted storylines, where wrestlers portray villains, heroes, or less distinguishable characters in the scripted events that build tension and culminate in a wrestling match or series of matches.

=== Event ===
The entire event was broadcast live on Stardom's YouTube channel. It started with the singles confrontation between Hanan and Matoi Hamabe in the latter's very in-ring debut match, bout won by Hanan. Next up, High Speed Champion Mei Seira and Future of Stardom Champion Miyu Amasaki picked up a victory over Yuna Mizumori and Momoka Hanazono in tag team competition. The third bout saw Professional Wrestling Just Tap Out's Sumika Yanagawa and Misa Kagura defeating Aya Sakura and Kurara Sayaka in tag team competition. Next up, ChiChi and Zones defeated Hanako and Rian in another tag team bout.

In the main event, Rina and Azusa Inaba defeated Lady C and Ranna Yagami to secure the second consecutive defense of the New Blood Tag Team Championship in that respective reign.

== Results ==
No.	Results	Stipulations	Times
1	Hanan defeated Matoi Hamabe	Singles match (Note: This was Hamabe's debut match. Her official ring name was announced on November 15, 2024.)	9:37
2	Neo Genesis (Mei Seira and Miyu Amasaki) defeated Yuna Mizumori and Momoka Hanazono	Tag team match	12:35
3	Sumika Yanagawa and Misa Kagura defeated Sakurara (Aya Sakura and Sayaka Kurara)	Tag team match	15:38
4	ChiChi and Zones defeated Empress Nexus Venus (Hanako and Rian)	Tag team match	11:51
5	Devil Princess (Rina and Azusa Inaba) (c) defeated God's Eye (Lady C and Ranna Yagami)	Tag team match for the New Blood Tag Team Championship	16:20
(c) / – the champion(s) heading into the match
