= Hiroshi Nagao =

Japanese professional wrestler

Personal information
- Born: Hiroshi Nagao; 26 December 1979 (age 46)

Professional wrestling career
- Ring name(s): Hiroshi Nagao; Nagao Ginga; Giant Vabo; Makai X
- Billed height: 1.96 m (6 ft 5 in)
- Billed weight: 253 lb (115 kg)
- Trained by: NJPW dojo Kenzo Suzuki; Kotetsu Yamamoto
- Debut: February 2, 2003
- Retired: October 26, 2008

Hiroshi Nagao (長尾 浩志, Nagao Hiroshi; December 26, 1979) is a retired Japanese professional wrestler who worked for New Japan Pro Wrestling (NJPW) and Hustle. Throughout Nagao's career, he competed mainly on the mid-card.

== Personal life ==
Hiroshi has a background in sports. During his time in school, Hiroshi would play volleyball and basketball due to his tall frame and interests.

Hiroshi is a fan of professional wrestling. He looked up to former NWA Worlds Heavyweight Champion Giant Baba who is his favourite wrestler who inspired him to wrestle. This is also the reason why he used the ring name "Giant Vabo".

== Professional wrestling career ==
=== New Japan Pro Wrestling (2003–2006) ===
Hiroshi trained under the NJPW Dojo in Japan as a "Young Lion". He was noticed by NJPW because of his size. He was postponed to his debut twice due to injuries.

Nagao made his professional debut in February 2003 for NJPW. He would star by forming the "Makai Club" which was a stable that included Hiroshi, named "Makai X" alongside leader Tadao Yasuda and the other Makais.

In 2005, Nagao competed in the Young Lion cup, but was unsuccessful. He was eliminated in the semi-finals by Akiya Anzawa. He then competed in the IWGP U-30 Openweight Title League. However, for Hiroshi, he did not score enough points in the league.

Hiroshi lost his last match in NJPW to Ryushi Yanagisawa.

=== Hustle (2006–2008) ===
After NJPW, Hiroshi made an appearance for All Japan Pro wrestling and occasional appearances for various shows in Japan such as Riki Pro and Pro Wrestling Zero1. He would sign a deal with Hustle which was the main wrestling promotion that Hiroshi would compete for. He debuted there as a member of Generalissimo Takada's Takada Monster Army. Hiroshi adopted a volleyball gimmick where he would make his entrance wearing a volleyball attire and carry a net of volleyballs, under the ring name "Giant Vabo" (parodying Giant Baba and a misspelling of volleyball). He formed a tag team with Giant Silva.

He was later expelled from the Monster Army, after which he changed his ring name to "Nagao Ginga" and his gimmick to a gymnast, teaming up with Ginga Iketani.

Towards the end of Hiroshi's career, he would compete in the Hustle Grand Prix, which is a knock-out system. In the first round, Hiroshi defeated Commander An Jo but would be defeated in the second round by Bono-chan on pay-per-view. On October 26, 2008, Hiroshi Nagao announced his retirement from competing in professional wrestling. Nagao's last match was against Zeus on a Hustle show, in a losing effort.

== In other media ==
Nagao is a playable character in the video game titled "King Of Colosseum II" created by Spike for PlayStation 2 in 2004.

== Mixed martial arts record ==
Professional record breakdown
1 match	0 wins	1 loss
By knockout	0	1
By submission	0	0
By decision	0	0

Res.	Record	Opponent	Method	Event	Date	Round	Time	Location	Notes
Loss	0-1	(Japan) Ryuta Noji	KO (knee)	Deep - 50th Impact	October 24, 2010	1	1:33	Tokyo, Japan	

== See also ==
- List of New Japan Pro Wrestling personnel
- Hustle professional wrestling Alumni
