= Katsuya Murashima =

Japanese professional wrestler

Personal information
- Born: Katsuya Murashima; November 1, 2000 (age 25) Ushiku, Ibaraki, Japan

Professional wrestling career
- Ring name: Katsuya Murashima
- Billed height: 5 ft 7 in (1.72 m)
- Billed weight: 100 kg (220 lb)
- Trained by: Hiroshi Tanahashi; Junji Hirata; NJPW Dojo
- Debut: November 21, 2023

Katsuya Murashima (村島 克哉, Murashima Katsuya; born November 1, 2000) is a Japanese professional wrestler signed to New Japan Pro-Wrestling (NJPW). He is on an international learning excursion, working for Westside Xtreme Wrestling (wXw) in Germany. He is the winner of the 2026 Young Lion Cup.

== Early life ==
Katsuya Murashima was born on November 1, 2000, in Ushiku, Ibaraki. He participated in amateur wrestling during his youth, winning the East Japan Student Championships in the 86 kg and 92 kg classes.

== Professional wrestling career ==
=== New Japan Pro-Wrestling (2023–present) ===
In April 2023, Murashima took part in New Japan Pro-Wrestling's (NJPW) entrance test and passed, working as a "Young Lion" (NJPW's term for rookies) from thereon. He made his in-ring debut on November 21, losing to Yuto Nakashima. At The New Beginning in Nagoya on January 20, 2024, he fought fellow Young Lion Shoma Kato to a time limit draw. Three days later, Murashima won the first match of his career, when he and Ryusuke Taguchi defeated Kato and Yoh in a tag team match. On October 5, he defeated Daiki Nagai in his first singles match. During this time, Murashami began working several tag team matches with Hiroshi Tanahashi and Jado, facing various stables including United Empire, Bullet Club, The Mighty Don't Kneel (TMDK), Just 4 Guys, Los Ingobernables de Japon (L.I.J.) and House of Torture.

At Power Struggle on November 4, 2024, he competed on the televised portion of the show, teaming with Intergalactic Jet Setters (Kevin Knight and KUSHIDA) and The Velocities (Jude London and Paris de Silva) in a loss to Bullet Club (Clark Connors, Drilla Moloney, Gabe Kidd, Robbie X and Taiji Ishimori) in a ten-man tag team match. On February 11, 2025, at The New Beginning in Osaka, he and El Desperado lost to United Empire's Francesco Akira and Jeff Cobb. Later that month, Murashima took part in the NJPW and Consejo Mundial de Lucha Libre (CMLL) co-promoted Fantastica Mania 2026 tour. Murashima made his pay-per-view debut on the Death Vegas Invitational pre-show on June 24, where he, Nagai, Taguchi and Master Wato lost to Dragon Libre, Gentaro, Kengo and Tatsuhito Takaiwa.

On January 4, 2026, Murashima and Masatora Yasuda defeated Kato and Tatsuya Matsumoto on the pre-show of Wrestle Kingdom 20, NJPW's biggest show of the year. Following the event, Murashima was announced as a participant in the revived Young Lion Cup tournament. He received a bye to the semi-finals, defeating Nagai. On February 1, Murashima defeated Kato in the finals to win the tournament. It was subsequently announced that he would be sent on a learning excursion outside Japan, signaling his graduation as a Young Lion. Murashima competed in his final match before his excursion at The New Beginning in Osaka on February 11, where he and Kato lost to Togi Makabe and Toru Yano.

=== Westside Xtreme Wrestling (2026–present) ===
On February 11, 2026, Westside Xtreme Wrestling (wXw) announced that Murashima would begin his excursion with them and join their roster full-time the following month, while also receiving further training at the wXw Wrestling Academy. He made his wXw in-ring debut at Inner Circle 19 - Homecoming on March 5, losing to Robert Dreissker. At Drive of Champions on June 6, Murashima was involved in a four-way match for the wXw Shotgun Championship involving Dennis Dullnig, Dieter Schwartz and Alex Tischer, who retained the championship.

== Championships and accomplishments ==
- New Japan Pro-Wrestling
  - Young Lion Cup (2026)
