= Shunji Kosugi =

Personal information
- Born: February 17, 1960 (age 66) Sado, Niigata, Japan

Professional wrestling career
- Ring name: Shunji Kosugi
- Billed height: 1.75 m (5 ft 9 in)
- Billed weight: 98 kg (216 lb)
- Trained by: Kotetsu Yamamoto; Tatsumi Fujinami; Yoshiaki Fujiwara; Karl Gotch
- Debut: January 11, 1981
- Retired: September 26, 2010

Shunji Kosugi (小杉俊二, Kosugi Shunji) (born February 17, 1960), is a retired Japanese professional wrestler, who was based in New Japan Pro-Wrestling (NJPW).

== Career ==
Shunji Kosugi made his debut on January 11, 1981 against Norio Honaga. He was known for his technical prowess in the ring, influenced by Karl Gotch. He was the last man to defeat Satoru Sayama, before Sayama became Tiger Mask and also the very first opponent of the future Jushin Thunder Liger, Keiichi Yamada. Kosugi's biggest accomplishment came in April 1985, when he defeated Yamada to win the very first Young Lion Cup.

As time went on, Kosugi suffered a severe back injury, which forced him to retire on April 10, 1988. His last recorded match as an active wrestler occurred on March 18, teaming with Don Arakawa, losing to Hiro Saito and Norio Honaga.

== Retirement ==
After retiring from the ring, he returned to his hometown to run a liquor store, owned by his wife's family.

On September 26, 2010, after over 22 years since his last match, Kosugi made a surprise return in a battle royal, held by Tatsumi Fujinami's Dradition promotion. Although he lost, he received a standing ovation by body slamming Kikutaro.

On September 18, 2019, at a Pro Wrestling Zero1 in Sado, he handed a bouquet to the soon retiring Jushin Thunder Liger.

== Championships and accomplishments ==
- New Japan Pro-Wrestling

- Young Lion Cup (1985)

- Tokyo Sports

- Service Award (1988)
