= Disband =

Disband may refer to:

- Disband (TV series) stylized as disBand, show on MuchMusic
- Disband (band), American band
