= List of current champions in New Japan Pro-Wrestling =

New Japan Pro-Wrestling (NJPW) is a professional wrestling promotion based in Nakano, Tokyo. Title reigns are either determined by professional wrestling matches or are awarded to a wrestler, as a result of the culmination of various scripted storylines. There are 11 total active championships promoted by NJPW - featuring six singles championships, three traditional tag team championships, and a six-man tag team championship for male wrestlers, with two singles championship for female wrestlers. 16 wrestlers currently hold the titles.

The list includes the number of times the wrestler has held the title, the date and location of the win, and a description of the winning bout. The following is correct as of November 20, 2026.

== Overview ==
Men's Singles

At the top of NJPW's championship hierarchy for male wrestlers in the heavyweight division is the IWGP Heavyweight Championship. Secondary titles include the IWGP Global Heavyweight Championship, and the NJPW World Television Championship.

In the junior heavyweight division, the IWGP Junior Heavyweight Championship is the primary title.

The NEVER Openweight Championship and the Strong Openweight Championship are available to male wrestlers regardless of weight class.

Men's Tag Team

For tag teams, there are three traditional championships for two-man teams—the IWGP Tag Team Championship, the Strong Openweight Tag Team Championship, and the IWGP Junior Heavyweight Tag Team Championship for the junior heavyweight division.

The NEVER Openweight 6-Man Tag Team Championship serves as the title for three-man teams.

Women's Division

There are two championships for female wrestlers in NJPW - the IWGP Women's Championship (the primary title which is defended in NJPW and partner promotion Stardom), and the Strong Women's Championship.

== Current champions ==
As of November 20, 2026.

=== Men's division ===
==== Singles ====
Championship	Current champion(s)	Reign	Date won	Days held	Successful defenses	Location	Notes	Ref.
IWGP Heavyweight Championship	Yota Tsuji	2	June 14, 2026	159	1	Osaka, Japan	Defeated Callum Newman at Dominion 6.14 in Osaka-jo Hall.	
IWGP Global Heavyweight Championship	Gabe Kidd	2	July 6, 2026	137	1	Tokyo, Japan	Defeated Shota Umino at Road to G1 Climax: Night 6	
IWGP Junior Heavyweight Championship	Yoh	1	June 14, 2026	159	1	Osaka, Japan	Defeated Douki at Dominion 6.14 in Osaka-jo Hall.	
NEVER Openweight Championship	Aaron Wolfey	2	June 14, 2026	159	0	Osaka, Japan	Defeated Ren Narita at Dominion 6.14 in Osaka-jo Hall.	
Strong Openweight Championship	Boltin Oleg	1	February 27, 2026	266	0	Trenton, New Jersey	Defeated Tomohiro Ishii at The New Beginning USA	
NJPW World Television Championship	Toru Yano	1	November 19, 2026	1	0	Tokyo, Japan	Defeated Shun Skywalker at Tanahashi Jam 2.	
NJPW TAMASHII Openweight Championship	Don Fale	1	October 10, 2026	188	Auckland, New Zealand	Defeated Johnny Recon and Trent Hooper on Tamashii.		

==== Tag team ====
Championship	Current champion(s)	Reign	Date won	Days held	Successful defenses	Location	Notes	Ref.
IWGP Tag Team Championship	Knock Out Brothers (Yuto-Ice and Oskar)	2	October 6, 2026	45	0	Tokyo, Japan	Defeated United Empire (Henare and Great-O-Khan) of Night 1 of Road to King of Pro-Wrestling.	
IWGP Junior Heavyweight Tag Team Championship	El Desperado and Místico	1 (5, 1)	May 4, 2026	200	1	Fukuoka, Japan	Defeated Ichiban Sweet Boys (Robbie Eagles and Kosei Fujita) on Night 2 of Wrestling Dontaku.	
Strong Openweight Tag Team Championship	Unbound Co. (Taiji Ishimori & Titan)	1	November 16, 2026	4	2	Mexico City, Mexico	Defeated United Empire (TJP and Templario) at CMLL Viernes Espectacular.	
NEVER Openweight 6-Man Tag Team Championship	Unbound Co. (Yuto-Ice, Oskar, and Jeff Cobb)	1	October 12, 2026	39	0	Tokyo, Japan	Defeated United Empire (Will Ospreay, Henare, and Great-O-Khan) at King of Pro-Wrestling.	
NJPW TAMASHII Tag Team Championship	Ungrateful 1s (T.J. Illes and Trent Hooper)	1	May 16, 2026	188	0	Auckland, New Zealand	Defeated The Pretty Boys (Magic Mark and Pretty Richie) on Tamashii.	

=== Women's division ===
Championship	Current champion(s)	Reign	Date won	Days held	Successful defenses	Location	Notes	Ref.
IWGP Women's Championship	Syuri	2	October 13, 2025	403	5	Tokyo, Japan	Defeated Sareee at King of Pro-Wrestling.	
Strong Women's Championship	Alex Windsor	1	March 8, 2026	257	1	London, England	Defeated Syuri at Wrestle Queendom VIII. This was a Pro-Wrestling: EVE event.	
