= Thekla (wrestler) =

Austrian professional wrestler (born 1993)

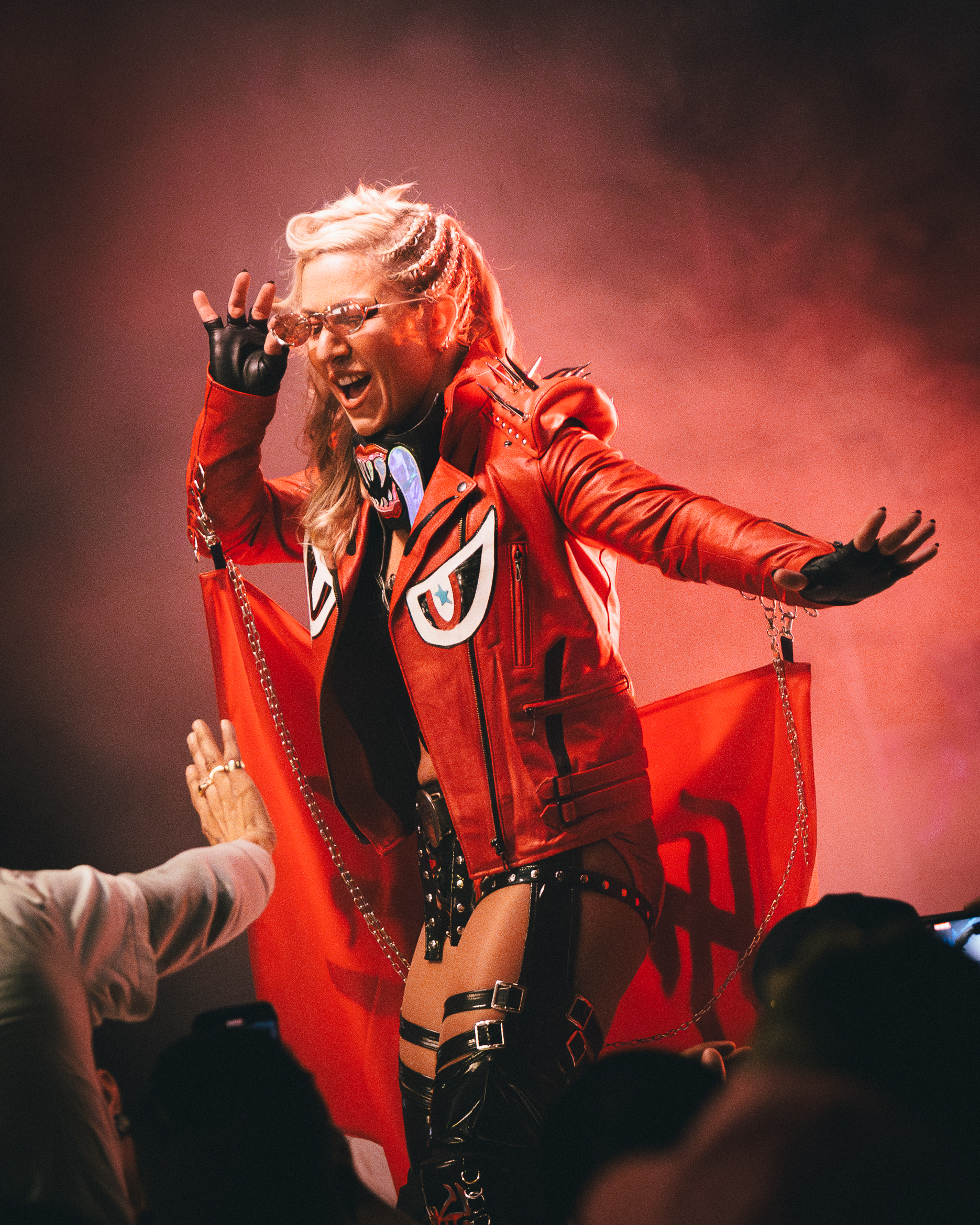
- Thekla in April 2025

Personal information
- Born: Thekla Kaischauri; 30 April 1993 (age 33) Vienna, Austria
- Education: University of Applied Arts Vienna (MFA)

Professional wrestling career
- Ring name: Thekla
- Billed height: 155 cm (5 ft 1 in)
- Billed weight: 52 kg (115 lb)
- Billed from: Vienna, Austria
- Trained by: Gerhard Hradil; Ice Ribbon Dojo; Liesinger Loisl; Lord Humungus; Mirko Panic; Mio Shirai; Tsukushi Haruka; Wrestling School Austria
- Debut: 18 June 2017

Thekla Kaischauri (born 30 April 1993), better known mononymously as Thekla (Japanese: テクラ, Hepburn: Tekura), is an Austrian professional wrestler. As of May 2025, she is signed to All Elite Wrestling (AEW) and is a member of the Triangle of Madness stable. She also appears in partner promotion World Wonder Ring Stardom, where she, along with Julia Hart and Skye Blue, are the reigning Artist of Stardom Champions in their first reign as a team and her second individual reign. In Stardom, she became one of the few high-profile gaijin in Japanese women's wrestling.

Known for her villainous character work, Kaischauri is nicknamed the "Idol Killer" for her brusque and antagonistic in-ring persona, which contrasts sharply with the cute and cheerful "idol" archetype expected of most female wrestlers in Japan. As a founding and principal member of Stardom's villainous H.A.T.E. stable, she was portrayed as someone who sought to "rid the joshi wrestling scene" of idol culture, which drove most of her feuds and storylines. She is also billed as "The Toxic Spider" for combining an aggressive and agile wrestling style (which emphasizes grappling, submission, and fluid acrobatics) with arachnid-themed attires and moves.

Kaischauri performs with a gimmick that incorporates elements from her background in dance, gymnastics, music, and visual art. Her performance style differs from traditional joshi puroresu conventions. She is a former SWA World Champion, Goddess of Stardom Champion (with Momo Watanabe), and Artist of Stardom Champion (with Giulia and Mai Sakurai).

Before joining Stardom in 2022, Kaischauri toured the independent circuit in Austria and Japan, achieving breakthrough success in the latter at Ice Ribbon, where she won the Triangle Ribbon Championship and earned a reputation for her technical fighting style and heel work. In AEW, she is a former one-time AEW Women's World Champion.

== Early life ==
Thekla Kaischauri was born in Vienna on 30 April 1993, the daughter of a Georgian mother and Austrian father. She grew up in the city's Landstraße district. She was an active child who practised ballet, gymnastics, martial arts, and swimming, as well as playing the violin. As a teenager, she played guitar and formed a punk rock band called the Death Row Groupies. She continued her education after beginning her professional wrestling career, and graduated from the University of Applied Arts Vienna with an MFA in 2020.

== Professional wrestling career ==
=== Independent circuit (2017–2020) ===
As a student, Kaischauri was highly active in Vienna's DIY and punk scene, which overlapped with the city's underground wrestling subculture. She was inspired to become a professional wrestler after she "accidentally happened to run into a wrestling show" around the age of 19. She also frequently visited the Weberknecht for its underground wrestling matches, which were held in the basement by Wrestling School Austria (WSA).

Kaischauri trained at WSA in Vienna under Gerhard Hradil, one of many professional wrestlers who used the Humungus character, and later recounted creating her signature "spider-like moves" in a "basement dojo" in Leopoldstadt. Using the mononym Thekla (Kaischauri's real first name), she made her professional wrestling debut on 18 June 2017, for the Vienna's chapter of World Underground Wrestling (WUW), a Japan-based federation of independent promotions from around the world. For most of the following year, Thekla performed in Vienna's underground wrestling scene, which lacked many of the rules and conventions of mainstream professional wrestling, such as an enclosed ring and time limits. Most matches were at Weberknecht, with the rest taking place at pub cellars and other informal venues. Kaischauri fondly recalled the city's wrestling scene as "loud, chaotic, and cheeky", and described "Viennese audiences" as "the best".

Thekla's in-ring debut took place on 21 April 2018 at IPW Germany Eishaus Explosion 2, an event promoted by Independent Pro Wrestling (IPW) Germany in Lübeck. On 8 July 2018, she returned to Weberknecht to wrestle in the main event of WUW Summerfest, failing to take the WUW Austria Women's Championship in a Triple Threat Submission match. Thekla would perform only sporadically in her native Austria, mostly for WUW and Rings of Europe (RoE) in Vienna, as her career increasingly shifted towards Japan.

=== Transition to Japan (2018) ===
Through WSA's membership in the Japan-based WUW, and Hradil's professional ties to the Japanese wrestling scene, Kaischauri began performing in the Japanese independent circuit in late 2017. She considers her entry into Japan as the first time she truly began to perform as a professional wrestler. Over the next two years, she divided her time between Vienna and Japan, with the vast majority of her appearances in the latter. In winter 2020, following a six-week tour in Japan, she opted to remain in the country in the wake of the COVID-19 lockdowns, seeing an opportunity to continue advancing her wrestling career in the Japanese market. Thekla subsequently appeared in several independent Japanese wrestling promotions, including Frontier Martial-Arts Wrestling, Gleat, Seadlinnng, and World Woman Pro-Wrestling Diana.

Kaischauri later described adjusting to Japanese professional wrestling, which differed significantly from the Viennese underground scene: "In the cellar of the Weberknecht it is hard, damp, and dirty. You fight on a small stage on 5 cm thick mats, which can be painful. But it's raw and awesome, the audience is fully involved and very close to you. The Japanese, on the other hand, are much quieter and more distant, especially during the Corona period. It was often really quiet as a mouse during fights, because clapping and screaming were forbidden. So you're fighting in front of an audience that makes 'Yikes!' to the maximum – but when that happens, then you know: 'now I've got it.'" She also recounts having to break through cultural and linguistic barriers as a foreigner working in Japan, including her successful efforts to learn the language.

=== Ice Ribbon (2019–2021) ===
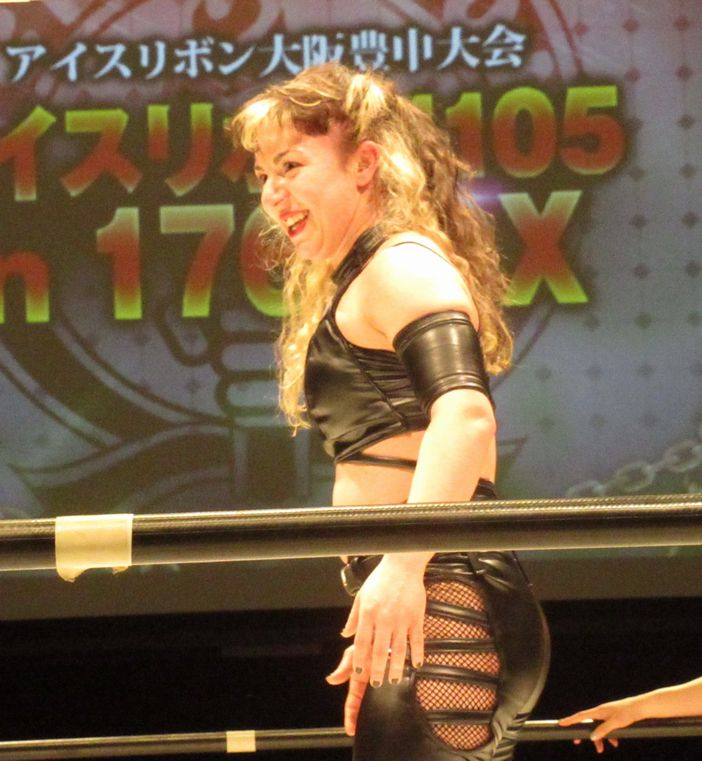
Thekla in March 2021

Thekla made her first appearance at Ice Ribbon on 27 July 2019, teaming up with Hamuko Hoshi and Suzu Suzuki in a losing effort against Asahi, Matsuya Uno and Tsukasa Fujimoto in a six-woman tag team match. She spent most of the summer performing at Ice Ribbon shows in Japan before briefly returning to Austria in September, where she later won her first championship title, the World Underground Wrestling (WUW) Women's Championship, on 15 December 2019 at the Weberknecht.

Thekla returned to Ice Ribbon in 2020 and spent most of the year wrestling in their events; her tenure was focused on defending the WUW Women’s Championship, which she briefly lost to Cherry in July before reclaiming it the following month. Thekla successfully held the title for the rest of the year, traveling to Austria in September to perform in a few shows for WUW and ROE through October. She returned to Japan in late 2020 and opted to settle in the country during COVID-19 lockdown. Due to the subsequent stoppage of live shows, Thekla trained at Ice Ribbon's dojo on the outskirts of Tokyo; she described the period as "lonely" but "extremely focused" and "the basis for the success I have now." Her 2020 run with Ice Ribbon was highlighted for noteworthy matches against Risa Sera, Suzu Suzuki, and Maya Yukihi.

In January 2021, Thekla announced her return to Ice Ribbon full time. The following month, she unsuccessfully challenged Tsukushi Haruka for the IW19 Championship. Behind the scenes, she began receiving more wrestling training from Haruka and Mio Shirai. On 21 April 2021, Thekla was likewise thwarted by Risa Sera in a title match for the FantastICE Championship. On 3 May, at the promotion's Yokohama Ribbon show, Thekla captured the Triangle Ribbon Championship title after defeating Ibuki Hoshi and defending champion Matsuya Uno in a three-way contest, becoming the 40th Triangle Ribbon Champion.

On 13 November 2021, Thekla lost the WUW Women's Championship to Akane Fujita, having had the second longest single reign in the title's history as of February 2025, at 441 days; her combined reign of 658 days likewise remains the second longest. The match against Fujita would be her last appearance for Ice Ribbon, where she was described as a "big hit" for her distinctively aggressive persona and fighting style, which included engaging in "psychological warfare" against opponents on social media.

=== World Wonder Ring Stardom (2021–2026) ===
==== Debut and Donna Del Mondo (2021–2024) ====
Thekla first appeared for World Wonder Ring Stardom at its 2021 Super Wars trilogy event, during which she and Mirai performed as unknown masked assailants who kept attacking various wrestlers from the start of the first event on 3 November through the last event on 18 December 2021. On 25 December, Giulia announced that both masked wrestlers would join her Donna Del Mondo (DDM) stable at the beginning of 2022. On 3 January 2022, Thekla and Mirai were unveiled as the masked assailants and teamed up with Giulia to defeat Cosmic Angels (Tam Nakano, Unagi Sayaka and Mai Sakurai). DDM would come to enjoy "unprecedented dominance" of the Stardom promotion, as it was now composed of "seven members who are all legitimate contenders for the World and Wonder of Stardom Championships".

At Stardom Nagoya Supreme Fight on 29 January 2022, Thekla defeated Mina Shirakawa for the vacant SWA World Championship, earning her first title at the promotion. She lost the championship on 5 May to Mayu Iwatani during the Golden Week Fight Tour. At Flashing Champions on 28 May, Thekla unsuccessfully challenged AZM for the High Speed Championship. Thekla was announced as one of the 2022 5 Star Grand Prix participants, to compete in the Red Stars Block, but was unable to take part in the tournament due to injuries. She would ultimately take part in the 2024 edition of the event, instead performing in the Blue Stars Block, for which she would receive the 5★Star GP Award for her match against Suzu Suzuki.

In February 2022, roughly a month after her debut at Stardom, Thekla was described as one of the promotion's "10 best wrestlers" by The Sportster, which cited her bout against Shirakawa and subsequent winning of the SWA World Championship in her first attempt; the same publication later identified her as one of five wrestlers at Stardom who would "thrive" at WWE, the largest American promotion. In October 2022, Thekla was inaugurally listed among the top 150 female wrestlers in the PWI Women's 150, ranking No. 69; she would subsequently make PWI's 2023 and 2024 lists the top 250 female wrestlers worldwide.

At Flashing Champions 2023 on 27 May, Thekla and DDM stablemates Giulia and Mai Sakurai—collectively known as the Baribari Bombers—defeated REStart to win the Artist of Stardom Championship. Thekla would later be named alongside Giulia and Sakurai as forming one of PWI's top 100 tag teams of 2023, ranking No. 17. In November 2023, Thekla made her first major appearance outside Japan since January 2021, performing in matches in Singapore as part of the three-day Bushiroad Expo Asia 2023, which was co-produced by Stardom and Singaporean promotion Grapplemax.

At New Years Stars 2024 on 3 January 2024, the Baribari Bombers participated in the 2024 Triangle Derby. After reaching the finals and deciding to defend the Artist of Stardom Championship, they lost the match and titles to Abarenbo GE. The next day, just before Stardom's main event at NJPW's January 4 Tokyo Dome Show, Thekla and Mai Sakurai joined Giulia as the latter announced the dissolution of the Donna del Mondo faction. Kaischauri stated she would temporarily step away from the promotion and focus on artistic projects.

==== Oedo Tai / H.A.T.E (2024–2025) ====
Following her brief hiatus, Thekla returned to Stardom on 27 April 2024, causing Mina Shirakawa to lose her match again Natsuko Tora, and joining the latter's villainous Oedo Tai faction. In a subsequent promo, Thekla denounced her former faction and stablemates and said she was coming back to "completely eradicate idol culture". She subsequently appeared at Stardom Nighter in Korakuen II on 23 July alongside her new Odeo Tai stablemate Momo Watanabe, with whom she successfully won the Goddesses of Stardom Championship by defeating God's Eye members Syuri and Konami. Five days later, during the Stardom Sapporo World Rendezvous, Tora, surrounded by Saya Kamitani and the members of Oedo Tai, Thekla included, declared that Oedo Tai was dissolved and the assembled stable would be known by the newly created unit, H.A.T.E..

Thekla was a main contender at the Historic X-Over II pay-per-view crossover event between Stardom and its parent promotion New Japan Pro-Wrestling, which was broadcast live on 17 November 2024 from the EDION Arena in Osaka. She also wrestled at the fourth annual Stardom Dream Queendom 2024 on 29 December, where she and fellow H.A.T.E. stablemate Momo Watanabe lost their Goddesses of Stardom Championship titles against Hanan and Saya Iida of the Stars faction. At Stardom All Star Grand Queendom 2025, Thekla was defeated by Sayaka Kurara. Due to the stipulation, Thekla would have had to join Kurara in Cosmic Angels, but instead she attacked Stardom president Taro Okada, who (kayfabe) fired her, writing her off and officially ending her four-year tenure with the promotion.

=== All Elite Wrestling (2025–present) ===
Thekla made her All Elite Wrestling (AEW) debut on 28 May 2025 episode of Dynamite, where she attacked Jamie Hayter. On 4 June at Collision: Fyter Fest, Thekla made her in-ring debut, defeating Lady Frost. On 12 July at All In, Thekla participated in the women's Casino Gauntlet match, but failed to win. On the following episode of Dynamite, Thekla aligned herself with Julia Hart and Skye Blue after the duo helped her win a $100K four-way match. The trio would go by the name of "Triangle of Madness". At All Out on September 20, Thekla competed in a four-way match for the AEW Women's World Championship, but failed to win. On October 18 at WrestleDream, Thekla was defeated by Jamie Hayter, suffering her first singles loss in AEW. On November 12 at Blood & Guts, Triangle of Madness competed in the first ever women's Blood and Guts match, where their team was victorious.

On the January 28, 2026 episode of Dynamite, Thekla unsuccessfully challenged Kris Statlander for the Women's World Championship. On the February 11 episode of Dynamite, Thekla defeated Statlander in a strap match to become the AEW Women's World Champion, marking her first world championship in her career. At Revolution on March 15, Thekla retained her title against Statlander in a two out of three falls match, winning 2-1. On April 12 at Dynasty, Thekla successfully defended her title against Jamie Hayter. At Double or Nothing on May 24, Theka successfully defended her title in a four-way match against Hayter, Statlander, and Hikaru Shida. At Forbidden Door on June 28, Thekla successfully defended her title against World Wonder Ring Stardom's Starlight Kid. At Redemption on July 26, Thekla lost her title to Willow Nightingale, ending her reign at 165 days. On September 26 at All Out, Thekla defeated Nightingale in a Redemption rematch to become the number one contender for the women's world title, which was now held by Mercedes Moné. On October 17 at WrestleDream, Thekla failed to regain the title from Moné.

On November 4, Triangle of Madness competed in a six-on-six Blood and Guts match at the namesake event, where their team was defeated.

=== Return to World Wonder Ring Stardom (2026–present) ===
While signed to All Elite Wrestling, Thekla would continue to make appearances for Stardom through a working relationship. At Stardom American Dream 2026 on April 17, 2026, Theka returned to Stardom and attacked Taro Okada, continuing their feud. At Stardom The Conversion 2026 on June 20, Thekla returned to Japan and once again tried to attack Okada before being ran off her Forbidden Door opponent Starlight Kid. At 2026 5 Star Grand Prix on July 18, Thekla, alongside Triangle of Madness stablemates Julia Hart and Skye Blue, defeated Dream Trine (Hina, Ami Sohrei, and Lady C) to win the Artist of Stardom Championship.

== Professional wrestling style and persona ==
Kaischauri's wrestling style has been called "very unique, hyper energy, and frenetic", due in large part to her childhood training in ballet and gymnastics, which allows her to be "hyper flexib[le]". Profil described her "movement [as coming] from another world, one that is otherwise only inhabited by eight-year-old ballet gymnasts or floor gymnasts with bodybuilder abdominal muscles". During her tenure at Ice Ribbon, she was identified as having "excellent technical wrestling skills", which focuses on holds, takedowns, submissions, and grappling. In addition to practicing martial arts in her youth, she received initial professional wrestling training at the Wrestling School Austria (WSA), where she learned basic techniques of rolling, grappling, and striking, and trained at Ice Ribbon's dojo in Tokyo from late 2019. Kaischauri states that her training regimen is well-rounded and focuses on "Power, muscles, cardio, technique" which she described as "all [being] important" for her performances. She is also known to design her own wrestling gear and apparel, and writes her own entrance theme. During her time in Stardom as a member of the H.A.T.E. stable, she often contributes creative ideas to the stable.

== Personal life ==
Kaischauri is a fan of the football club SK Rapid Wien.

In addition to her native Austrian German, Kaischauri reportedly also speaks English, Spanish, French, Georgian, and Japanese, teaching herself the latter after moving to Japan.

Outside of wrestling, Kaischauri paints, makes music, and exhibits her art. She once participated in a production at the national Burgtheater in Vienna, and used her in-ring hiatus in early 2024 to focus on artistic pursuits. In November 2024, she announced that she would be hosting an art exhibition in Tokyo during NJPW Wrestle Kingdom 19 in January 2025. She believes her careers as an artist and a wrestler are interrelated, stating that "wrestling inspires the painting and then the painting inspires what [she does] in the ring". She considers professional wrestling to be a form of creative expression in its own right, stating that "the ring is [her] canvas and [she paints] a pretty wild picture".

Kaischauri has a self-described "soft spot for Japanese culture", which she cited as one of her reasons for moving to Japan in 2020. She has been compared to Canadian professional wrestler Kenny Omega, who likewise found success performing primarily in Japan and settled there. Her manager Kanae Imai claimed that she is "one of the few foreigners who started their careers in Japan themselves".

Kaischauri has expressed interest in performing outside Japan, including Cambodia, Nepal, and North America. In November 2024, she stated that she was exploring opportunities in the United States and that she would make an announcement in the future; six months later, she debuted for AEW.

== Championships and accomplishments ==
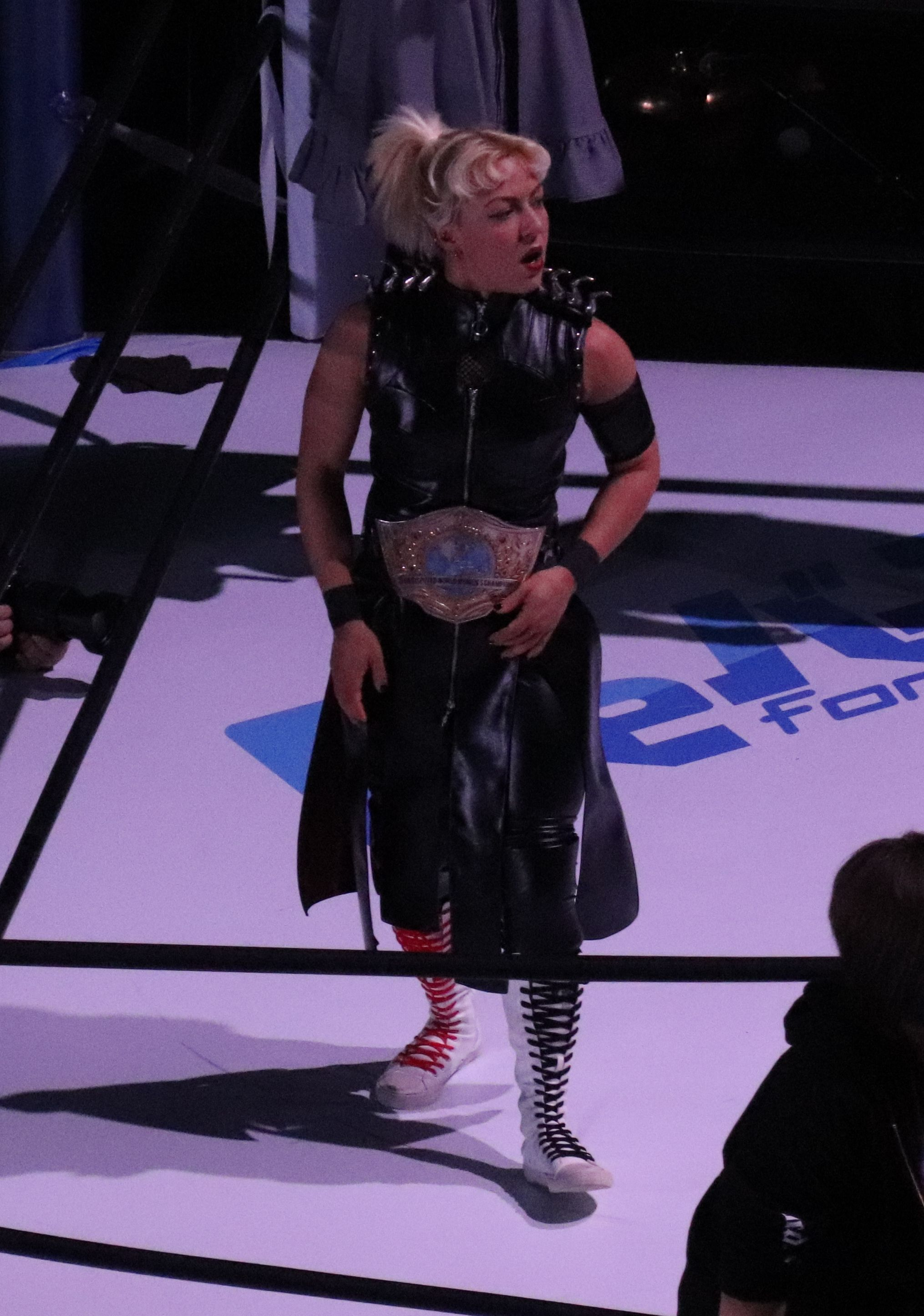
In Stardom, Thekla is a former SWA World Champion.

- All Elite Wrestling
  - AEW Women's World Championship (1 time)
- Ice Ribbon
  - Triangle Ribbon Championship (1 time)
  - WUW Underground Wrestling Women's Championship (2 times)
- Pro Wrestling Illustrated
  - Ranked No. 3 of the top 250 female wrestlers in the PWI Female 250 in 2026
  - No. 17 of the top 100 tag teams (Donna Del Mondo) – PWI Top 100 Tag team (2023)
- World Wonder Ring Stardom
  - Goddess of Stardom Championship (1 time) – with Momo Watanabe
  - Artist of Stardom Championship (2 times, current) – with Giulia and Mai Sakurai (1) and Julia Hart and Skye Blue (1, current)
  - SWA World Championship (1 time)
  - 5★Star GP Awards (1 time)
    - Blue Stars Best Match Award (2024) vs. Suzu Suzuki on 20 August in Blue Stars B
