= Stardom 5 Star Grand Prix 2024 =

2024 World Wonder Ring Stardom wrestling event

- Promotional poster

Tournament information
- Sport: Professional wrestling
- Location: Japan
- Dates: August 10, 2024–August 31, 2024
- Tournament format: Four-block round-robin
- Host: World Wonder Ring Stardom
- Participants: 28

Final positions
- Champions: Maika
- Runner-up: Saya Kamitani

Tournament statistics
- Matches played: 93

Stardom 5 Star Grand Prix 2024 (スターダム5スターグランプリ2024, Sutādamu 5 sutāguranpuri 2024), often stylized as 5★Star GP 2024 was the thirteenth annual professional wrestling tournament under the Stardom 5Star Grand Prix Tournament branch promoted by the Japanese promotion World Wonder Ring Stardom. It took place between August 10 and 31, 2024.

== Tournament history ==
The Stardom 5 Star Grand Prix is a professional wrestling tournament held each summer by Stardom. Similar to Bushiroad-owned male counterpart New Japan Pro-Wrestling with the G1 Climax tournament, it is currently held as a round-robin tournament with wrestlers split into two pools. The winner of each pool will compete in the final to decide the winner. As is the case with G1 Climax, a win is two points and a draw is one point for each wrestler.

=== Storylines ===
The event featured professional wrestling matches that resulted from scripted storylines, where wrestlers portrayed villains, heroes, or less distinguishable characters in the scripted events that built tension and culminated in a wrestling match or series of matches.

== Qualifiers ==
The format of the tournament saw 28 wrestlers divided in two major blocks divided in other two sub-blocks. Stardom initially announced twenty-four contestants with four extra having to undergo a series of qualifying matches for the last spot in each of the final blocks.

=== A Block Qualifiers ===
Round 1 (July 23, 2024)
Miyu Amasaki	Pin
Aya Sakura	4:21
Momo Kohgo	6:54
Lady C	Pin

Round 2 (July 28, 2024)
Miyu Amasaki	Pin
Lady C	11:04

=== B Block Qualifiers ===
Round 1 (July 23, 2024)
Waka Tsukiyama	Pin
Sayaka Kurara	4:00
Ruaka	4:28
Yuna Mizumori	DQ

Round 2 (July 27, 2024)
Waka Tsukiyama	9:30
Yuna Mizumori	Pin

== Participants ==
*Noted underneath are the champions who held their titles at the time of the tournament. The titleholders or even the number of contestants can change over time.

Wrestler	Unit	Notes
AZM	Neo Genesis	
Hanan	Stars	
Hazuki	Stars	
Koguma	Stars	
Konami	H.A.T.E.	
Manami	Unaffiliated	Sendai Girls' Pro Wrestling
Maika	Empress Nexus Venus	Winner
Mayu Iwatani	Stars	IWGP Women's Champion
Mei Seira	Neo Genesis	High Speed Champion
Momo Watanabe	H.A.T.E.	Goddess of Stardom Champion
Ruaka	H.A.T.E.	Replaced Natsuko Tora; who gave up her spot to Ruaka after winning the World of Stardom Championship at Stardom Sapporo World Rendezvous.
Natsupoi	Cosmic Angels	Wonder of Stardom Champion; Artist of Stardom Champion
Ranna Yagami	God's Eye	Replaced Ami Sourei; who sustained a torn ACL.
Saki Kashima	God's Eye	
Saori Anou	Cosmic Angels	Artist of Stardom Champion
Saya Iida	Stars	
Saya Kamitani	H.A.T.E.	
Starlight Kid	Neo Genesis	
Suzu Suzuki	Neo Genesis	
Syuri	God's Eye	
Tam Nakano	Cosmic Angels	Artist of Stardom Champion
Thekla	H.A.T.E.	Goddess of Stardom Champion
Tomoka Inaba	God's Eye	
Xena	Empress Nexus Venus	
Yuna Mizumori	Cosmic Angels	Red Block B qualifier winner
Miyu Amasaki	Neo Genesis	Red Block A qualifier winner
Risa Sera	Prominence	Freelancer; Announced as one of the two mystery competitiors on July 27, 2024.
Anna Jay	AEW	All Elite Wrestling; Announced as one of the two mystery competitiors on July 27, 2024.

== Standings ==
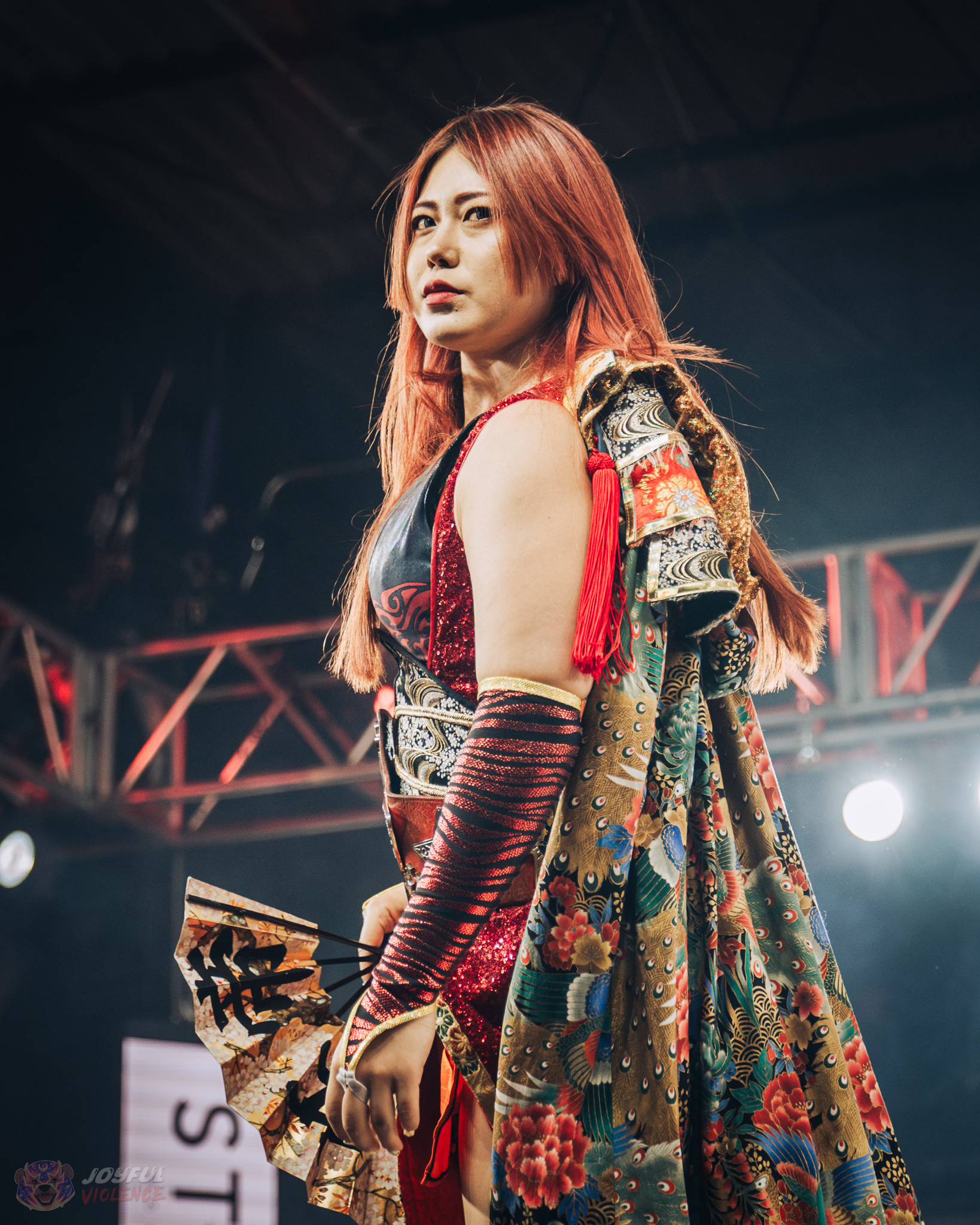
2024 Stardom 5Star Grand Prix winner Maika.

=== Overview ===
Final standings
Blue Stars A		Blue Stars B		Red Stars A		Red Stars B	
Syuri	8	Saya Kamitani	8	Maika	12	Mayu Iwatani	10
Starlight Kid	8	Suzu Suzuki	7	Natsupoi	9	AZM	8
Saori Anou	7	Hanan	7	Hazuki	7	Tomoka Inaba	8
Anna Jay	6	Risa Sera	6	Konami	6	Mei Seira	8
Koguma	6	Saki Kashima	6	Manami	5	Momo Watanabe	4
Xena	4	Ranna Yagami	4	Ruaka	3	Saya Iida	4
Miyu Amasaki	3	Thekla	4	Yuna Mizumori	0	Tam Nakano	0

Blue Stars A	Anou	Syuri	Kid	Xena	Koguma	Jay	Amasaki
Anou	—N/a	Anou (12:17)	Draw (15:00)	Anou (13:21)	Koguma (3:16)	Jay (5:31)	Anou (10:20)
Syuri	Anou (12:17)	—N/a	Syuri (11:08)	Syuri (12:00)	Koguma (10:33)	Syuri (5:35)	Syuri (7:07)
Kid	Draw (15:00)	Syuri (11:08)	—N/a	Kid (10:31)	Kid (13:35)	Kid (9:49)	Draw (15:00)
Xena	Anou (13:21)	Syuri (12:00)	Kid (10:31)	—N/a	Xena (9:04)	Xena (10:03)	Amasaki (2:15)
Koguma	Koguma (3:16)	Koguma (10:33)	Kid (13:35)	Xena (9:04)	—N/a	Jay (6:41)	Koguma (0:49)
Jay	Jay (5:31)	Syuri (5:35)	Kid (9:49)	Xena (10:03)	Jay (6:41)	—N/a	Jay (8:02)
Amasaki	Anou (10:20)	Syuri (7:07)	Draw (15:00)	Amasaki (2:15)	Koguma (0:49)	Jay (8:02)	—N/a

Blue Stars B	Suzuki	Kamitani	Hanan	Yagami	Kashima	Thekla	Sera
Suzuki	—N/a	Kamitani (10:38)	Draw (8:56)	Suzuki (5:06)	Suzuki (4:58)	Suzuki (11:09)	Sera (13:49)
Kamitani	Kamitani (10:38)	—N/a	Hanan (9:55)	Kamitani (8:13)	Kashima (6:45)	Kamitani (12:33)	Kamitani (10:48)
Hanan	Draw (8:56)	Hanan (9:55)	—N/a	Yagami (6:50)	Kashima (0:20)	Hanan (9:42)	Hanan (13:32)
Yagami	Suzuki (5:06)	Kamitani (8:13)	Yagami (6:50)	—N/a	Yagami (0:30)	Thekla (3:40)	Sera (8:46)
Kashima	Suzuki (4:58)	Kashima (6:45)	Kashima (0:20)	Yagami (0:30)	—N/a	Kashima (3:43)	Sera (9:50)
Thekla	Suzuki (11:09)	Kamitani (12:33)	Hanan (9:42)	Thekla (3:40)	Kashima (3:43)	—N/a	Thekla (7:44)
Sera	Sera (13:49)	Kamitani (10:48)	Hanan (13:32)	Sera (8:46)	Sera (9:50)	Thekla (7:44)	—N/a

Red Stars A	Maika	Hazuki	Ruaka	Konami	Manami	Natsupoi	Mizumori
Maika	—N/a	Maika (14:39)	Maika (7:42)	Maika (7:38)	Maika (8:57)	Maika (13:11)	Maika (9:06)
Hazuki	Maika (14:39)	—N/a	Hazuki (9:19)	Konami (9:36)	Hazuki (9:08)	Natsupoi (15:00)	Hazuki (10:21)
Ruaka	Maika (7:42)	Hazuki (9:19)	—N/a	Konami (6:26)	Draw (15:00)	Natsupoi (8:58)	Ruaka (7:43)
Konami	Maika (7:38)	Konami (9:36)	Konami (6:26)	—N/a	Manami (9:57)	Natsupoi (7:39)	Konami (6:33)
Manami	Maika (8:57)	Hazuki (9:08)	Draw (15:00)	Manami (9:57)	—N/a	Natsupoi (12:56)	Manami (5:06)
Natsupoi	Maika (13:11)	Draw (15:00)	Natsupoi (8:58)	Natsupoi (7:39)	Natsupoi (12:56)	—N/a	Natsupoi (11:33)
Mizumori	Maika (9:06)	Hazuki (10:21)	Ruaka (7:43)	Konami (6:33)	Manami (5:06)	Natsupoi (11:33)	—N/a

Red Stars B	Iwatani	Nakano	Watanabe	AZM	Seira	Iida	Inaba
Iwatani	—N/a	Iwatani (13:45)	Iwatani (12:55)	AZM (9:34)	Iwatani (10:37)	Iwatani (12:41)	Iwatani (4:23)
Nakano	Iwatani (13:45)	—N/a	Watanabe (13:21)	AZM (9:43)	Seira (12:19)	Iida (13:52)	Inaba (11:36)
Watanabe	Iwatani (12:55)	Watanabe (13:21)	—N/a	AZM (11:24)	Seira (10:36)	Watanabe (11:12)	Inaba (12:01)
AZM	AZM (9:34)	AZM (9:43)	AZM (11:24)	—N/a	Draw (15:00)	Iida (7:59)	Draw (12:47)
Seira	Iwatani (10:37)	Seira (12:19)	Seira (10:36)	Draw (15:00)	—N/a	Seira (7:26)	Draw (15:00)
Iida	Iwatani (12:41)	Iida (13:52)	Watanabe (11:12)	Iida (7:59)	Seira (7:26)	—N/a	Inaba (7:18)
Inaba	Iwatani (4:23)	Inaba (11:36)	Inaba (12:01)	Draw (12:47)	Draw (15:00)	Inaba (7:18)	—N/a

Quarterfinals (August 28, 2024)
Blue A1	Syuri	13:02
Blue B2	Hanan	Pin
Blue B1	Saya Kamitani	Pin
Blue A2	Starlight Kid	15:53
Red A1	Maika	Pin
Red B2	AZM	11:11
Red B1	Mayu Iwatani	Pin
Red A2	Natsupoi	11:28

Semifinals (August 31, 2024)
Hanan	10:22
Saya Kamitani	Pin
Maika	Pin
Mayu Iwatani	11:44

Final (August 31, 2024)
Saya Kamitani	27:23
Maika	Pin

== Results ==
=== Day 1 ===
The first day took place on August 10, 2024.

No.	Results	Stipulations	Times
1	Stars (Saya Iida, Koguma and Momo Kohgo) defeated God's Eye (Lady C and Hina) and Rian by pinfall	Six-woman tag team match	8:37
2	Azusa Inaba and H.A.T.E. (Natsuko Tora, Rina and Thekla) defeated Cosmic Angels (Aya Sakura, Sayaka Kurara and Yuna Mizumori) and Waka Tsukiyama by submission	Eight-woman tag team match	9:37
3	Anna Jay defeated Saori Anou by pinfall	Blue Stars A match in the 5Star Grand Prix tournament	5:31
4	Konami defeated Ruaka by pinfall	Red Stars A match in the 5Star Grand Prix tournament	6:26
5	Miyu Amasaki defeated Xena by pinfall	Blue Stars A match in the 5Star Grand Prix tournament	2:15
6	Ranna Yagami defeated Saki Kashima by pinfall	Blue Stars B match in the 5Star Grand Prix tournament	3:30
7	Suzu Suzuki vs. Hanan ended in a double countout	Blue Stars B match in the 5Star Grand Prix tournament	8:56
8	Hazuki defeated Manami by pinfall	Red Stars A match in the 5Star Grand Prix tournament	9:08
9	Mei Seira vs. Tomoka Inaba ended in a time-limit draw	Red Stars B match in the 5Star Grand Prix tournament	15:00
10	Syuri defeated Starlight Kid by submission	Blue Stars A match in the 5Star Grand Prix tournament	11:08
11	AZM defeated Momo Watanabe by pinfall	Red Stars B match in the 5Star Grand Prix tournament	11:24
12	Saya Kamitani defeated Risa Sera by pinfall	Blue Stars B match in the 5Star Grand Prix tournament	10:48
13	Maika defeated Natsupoi by pinfall	Red Stars A match in the 5Star Grand Prix tournament	13:11
14	Mayu Iwatani defeated Tam Nakano by pinfall	Red Stars B match in the 5Star Grand Prix tournament	13:45

=== Day 2 ===
The second day took place on August 11, 2024

No.	Results	Stipulations	Times
1^{P}	God's Eye (Lady C and Hina) defeated Rian and Waka Tsukiyama by pinfall	Tag team match	8:08
2	Maika defeated Yuna Mizumori by pinfall	Red Stars A match in the 5Star Grand Prix tournament	9:06
3	Hazuki defeated Ruaka by pinfall	Red Stars A match in the 5Star Grand Prix tournament	9:19
4	Manami defeated Konami by pinfall	Red Stars A match in the 5Star Grand Prix tournament	9:57
5	H.A.T.E. (Rina and Natsuko Tora) defeated meltear (Tam Nakano and Natsupoi) by submission	Tag team match	11:44
6	Tomoka Inaba defeated Momo Watanabe by pinfall	Red Stars B match in the 5Star Grand Prix tournament	12:01
7	Mei Seira vs. AZM ended in a time-limit draw	Red Stars B match in the 5Star Grand Prix tournament	15:00
8	Mayu Iwatani defeated Saya Iida by pinfall	Red Stars B match in the 5 StarGrand Prix tournament	12:41
P / – the match was broadcast on the pre-show

=== Day 3 (Afternoon) ===
Two shows were held on day three, with the first taking place in the afternoon on August 12, 2024.

No.	Results	Stipulations	Times
1	Miyu Amasaki defeated Momo Kohgo, Waka Tsukiyama and Ranna Yagami by pinfall	Four-way match	4:19
2	Starlight Kid defeated Anna Jay by submission	Blue Stars A match in the 5Star Grand Prix tournament	9:49
3	Suzu Suzuki defeated Saki Kashima by pinfall	Blue Stars B match in the 5Star Grand Prix tournament	4:58
4	Xena defeated Koguma by pinfall	Blue Stars A match in the 5Star Grand Prix tournament	9:04
5	Saya Kamitani defeated Thekla by pinfall	Blue Stars B match in the 5Star Grand Prix tournament	12:33
6	Saori Anou defeated Syuri by pinfall	Blue Stars A match in the 5Star Grand Prix tournament	12:17
7	Hanan defeated Risa Sera by pinfall	Blue Stars B match in the 5Star Grand Prix tournament	13:32

=== Day 3 (Evening) ===
The second show on day three took place in the evening on August 12, 2024.

No.	Results	Stipulations	Times
1	Natsupoi defeated Yuna Mizumori by submission	Red Stars A match in the Stardom 5Star Grand Prix tournament	11:33
2	AZM vs. Tomoka Inaba ended in a double countout	Red Stars B match in the Stardom 5Star Grand Prix tournament	12:47
3	Konami defeated Hazuki by pinfall	Red Stars A match in the Stardom 5Star Grand Prix tournament	9:36
4	God's Eye (Lady C and Hina) defeated H.A.T.E. (Natsuko Tora and Rina) by pinfall	Tag team match	13:57
5	Mei Seira defeated Momo Watanabe by pinfall	Red Stars B match in the Stardom 5Star Grand Prix tournament	10:36
6	Manami vs. Ruaka ended in a time-limit draw	Red Stars A match in the Stardom 5Star Grand Prix tournament	15:00
7	Saya Iida defeated Tam Nakano by pinfall	Red Stars B match in the Stardom 5Star Grand Prix tournament	13:52

=== Day 4 ===
The fourth day took place on August 15, 2024.

No.	Results	Stipulations	Times
1	God's Eye (Lady C and Hina) defeated Stars (Momo Kohgo and Hazuki) and Cosmic Angels (Sayaka Kurara and Aya Sakura) by pinfall	Three-way tag team match	10:21
2	AZM defeated Tam Nakano by pinfall	Red Stars B match in the Stardom 5Star Grand Prix	9:43
3	Thekla defeated Ranna Yagami by pinfall	Blue Stars B match in the Stardom 5Star Grand Prix tournament	3:40
4	Koguma defeated Miyu Amasaki by pinfall	Blue Stars A match in the Stardom 5Star Grand Prix tournament	0:49
5	Tomoka Inaba defeated Saya Iida by pinfall	Red Stars B match in the Stardom 5Star Grand Prix tournament	7:18
6	H.A.T.E. (Natsuko Tora, Rina and Saya Kamitani) defeated Empress Nexus Venus (Xena and Waka Tsukiyama) and Mei Seira by pinfall	Six-woman tag team match	8:33
7	Natsupoi defeated Ruaka by submission	Red Stars A match in the Stardom 5Star Grand Prix tournament	8:58
8	Saki Kashima defeated Hanan by pinfall	Blue Stars B match in the Stardom 5Star Grand Prix tournament	0:20
9	Manami defeated Yuna Mizumori by pinfall	Red Stars A match in the Stardom 5Star Grand Prix tournament	5:06
10	Syuri defeated Anna Jay by submission	Blue Stars A match in the Stardom 5Star Grand Prix tournament	5:35
11	Maika defeated Konami by pinfall	Red Stars A match in the Stardom 5Star Grand Prix tournament	7:38
12	Risa Sera defeated Suzu Suzuki by pinfall	Blue Stars B match in the Stardom 5Star Grand Prix tournament	13:49
13	Saori Anou vs. Starlight Kid ended in a time-limit draw	Blue Stars A match in the Stardom 5Star Grand Prix tournament	15:00
14	Mayu Iwatani defeated Momo Watanabe by pinfall	Red Stars B match in the Stardom 5Star Grand Prix tournament	12:55

=== Day 5 ===
The fifth day took place on August 17, 2024.

No.	Results	Stipulations	Times
1	Saya Kamitani defeated Ranna Yagami by pinfall	Blue Stars B match in the Stardom 5Star Grand Prix tournament	8:13
2	Xena defeated Anna Jay by pinfall	Blue Stars A match in the Stardom 5Star Grand Prix tournament	10:03
3	Aya Sakura defeated Rian by submission	Singles match	6:48
4	Hanan defeated Thekla by pinfall	Blue Stars B match in the Stardom 5Star Grand Prix tournament	9:42
5	Starlight Kid defeated Koguma by submission	Blue Stars A match in the Stardom 5Star Grand Prix tournament	13:35
6	Risa Sera defeated Saki Kashima by pinfall	Blue Stars B match in the Stardom 5Star Grand Prix tournament	9:50
7	Saori Anou defeated Miyu Amasaki by pinfall	Blue Stars A match in the Stardom 5Star Grand Prix tournament	10:20

=== Day 6 ===
The sixth day took place on August 18, 2024.

No.	Results	Stipulations	Times
1	Maika defeated Ruaka by pinfall	Red Stars A match in the Stardom 5Star Grand Prix tournament	7:42
2	Hazuki defeated Yuna Mizumori by pinfall	Red Stars A match in the Stardom 5Star Grand Prix tournament	10:21
3	Mei Seira defeated Saya Iida by pinfall	Red Stars B match in the Stardom 5Star Grand Prix tournament	7:26
4	Natsuko Tora defeated Aya Sakura by submission	Singles match	9:03
5	Natsupoi defeated Konami by pinfall	Red Stars A match in the Stardom 5Star Grand Prix tournament	7:39
6	Momo Watanabe defeated Tam Nakano by submission	Red Stars B match in the Stardom 5Star Grand Prix tournament	13:21
7	AZM defeated Mayu Iwatani by pinfall	Red Stars B match in the Stardom 5Star Grand Prix tournament	9:34

=== Day 7 ===
The seventh day took place on August 20, 2024.

No.	Results	Stipulations	Times
1	Anna Jay defeated Miyu Amasaki by submission	Blue Stars A match in the Stardom 5Star Grand Prix tournament	8:02
2	Risa Sera defeated Ranna Yagami by pinfall	Blue Stars B match in the Stardom 5Star Grand Prix tournament	8:46
3	Koguma defeated Syuri by pinfall	Blue Stars A match in the Stardom 5Star Grand Prix tournament	10:33
4	Saki Kashima defeated Saya Kamitani by pinfall	Blue Stars B match in the Stardom 5Star Grand Prix tournament	6:45
5	Suzu Suzuki defeated Thekla by pinfall	Blue Stars B match in the Stardom 5Star Grand Prix tournament	11:09
6	Saori Anou defeated Xena by pinfall	Blue Stars A match in the Stardom 5Star Grand Prix tournament	12:31

=== Day 8 ===
The eighth day took place on August 23, 2024.

No.	Results	Stipulations	Times
1^{P}	Momo Kohgo defeated Rian and Sayaka Kurara by pinfall	Three-way match	4:30
2	Mayu Iwatani defeated Mei Seira by pinfall	Red Stars B match in the Stardom 5Star Grand Prix tournament	10:37
3	Konami defeated Yuna Mizumori by submission	Red Stars A match in the Stardom 5Star Grand Prix tournament	6:33
4	H.A.T.E. (Natsuko Tora, Ruaka and Rina) defeated Aya Sakura, Hina and Waka Tsukiyama by pinfall	Six-man tag team match	11:31
5	Momo Watanabe defeated Saya Iida by pinfall	Red Stars B match in the Stardom 5Star Grand Prix tournament	11:12
6	Tomoka Inaba defeated Tam Nakano by submission	Red Stars B match in the Stardom 5Star Grand Prix tournament	11:36
7	Natsupoi defeated Manami by submission	Red Stars A match in the Stardom 5Star Grand Prix tournament	12:56
8	Maika defeated Hazuki by pinfall	Red Stars A match in the Stardom 5Star Grand Prix tournament	14:39
P / – the match was broadcast on the pre-show

=== Day 9 ===
The ninth day took place on August 24, 2024.

No.	Results	Stipulations	Times
1^{P}	Waka Tsukiyama defeated Momo Kohgo and Rian by pinfall	Three-way match	5:32
2	Ranna Yagami defeated Hanan by pinfall	Blue Stars B match in the Stardom 5Star Grand Prix tournament	6:50
3	Anna Jay defeated Koguma by submission	Blue Stars A match in the Stardom 5Star Grand Prix tournament	6:41
4	God's Eye (Saki Kashima and Hina) defeated H.A.T.E. (Natsuko Tora and Rina) and Cosmic Angels (Aya Sakura and Sayaka Kurara) by pinfall	Three-way tag team match	7:41
5	Starlight Kid vs. Miyu Amasaki ended in a time-limit draw	Blue Stars A match in the Stardom 5Star Grand Prix tournament	15:00
6	Thekla defeated Risa Sera by disqualification	Blue Stars B match in the Stardom 5Star Grand Prix tournament	7:44
7	Syuri defeated Xena by pinfall	Blue Stars A match in the Stardom 5Star Grand Prix tournament	12:00
8	Saya Kamitani defeated Suzu Suzuki by pinfall	Blue Stars B match in the Stardom 5Star Grand Prix tournament	10:38
P / – the match was broadcast on the pre-show

=== Day 10 ===
The tenth day took place on August 25, 2024.

No.	Results	Stipulations	Times
1	Suzu Suzuki defeated Ranna Yagami by pinfall	Blue Stars B match in the Stardom 5Star Grand Prix tournament	5:06
2	Syuri defeated Miyu Amasaki by pinfall	Blue Stars A match in the Stardom 5Star Grand Prix tournament	7:07
3	Saya Iida defeated AZM by pinfall	Red Stars B match in the Stardom 5Star Grand Prix tournament	7:59
4	Maika defeated Manami by pinfall	Red Stars A match in the Stardom 5Star Grand Prix tournament	8:57
5	Ruaka defeated Yuna Mizumori by pinfall	Red Stars A match in the Stardom 5Star Grand Prix tournament	7:43
6	Saki Kashima defeated Thekla by pinfall	Blue Stars B match in the Stardom 5Star Grand Prix tournament	3:43
7	H.A.T.E. (Natsuko Tora and Rina) defeated Anna Jay and Hina by pinfall	Tag team match	10:21
8	Koguma defeated Saori Anou by pinfall	Blue Stars A match in the Stardom 5Star Grand Prix tournament	3:16
9	Starlight Kid defeated Xena by submission	Blue Stars A match in the Stardom 5Star Grand Prix tournament	10:31
10	Natsupoi vs. Hazuki ended in a time-limit draw	Red Stars A match in the Stardom 5Star Grand Prix tournament	15:00
11	Mayu Iwatani defeated Tomoka Inaba by pinfall	Red Stars B match in the Stardom 5Star Grand Prix tournament	4:23
12	Mei Seira defeated Tam Nakano by referee stoppage	Red Stars B match in the Stardom 5Star Grand Prix tournament	12:19
13	Hanan defeated Saya Kamitani by pinfall	Blue Stars B match in the Stardom 5Star Grand Prix tournament	9:55

=== Day 11 ===
The eleventh day took place on August 28, 2024.

No.	Results	Stipulations	Times
1	AZM defeated Tomoka Inaba and Mei Seira 2–1–1	Three-way Red Stars B playoff two-out-of-three falls match in the Stardom 5Star Grand Prix tournament	11:47
2	Hanan defeated Suzu Suzuki by pinfall	Blue Stars B playoff match in the Stardom 5Star Grand Prix tournament	10:34
3	Hina and Tam Nakano defeated H.A.T.E. (Natsuko Tora and Rina) by pinfall	Tag team match	13:48
4	Saya Kamitani defeated Starlight Kid by pinfall	Quarterfinals match in the Stardom 5Star Grand Prix tournament	15:53
5	Hanan defeated Syuri by pinfall	Quarterfinals match in the Stardom 5Star Grand Prix tournament	13:02
6	Mayu Iwatani defeated Natsupoi by pinfall	Quarterfinals match in the Stardom 5Star Grand Prix tournament	11:28
7	Maika defeated AZM by pinfall	Quarterfinals match in the Stardom 5Star Grand Prix tournament	11:11

=== Day 12 ===
The twelfth and final day took place on August 31, 2024.

No.	Results	Stipulations	Times
1^{P}	Waka Tsukiyama defeated Rian by pinfall	Singles match	8:14
2^{P}	Fukuoka Double Crazy (Hazuki and Koguma) defeated Cosmic Angels (Sayaka Kurara and Aya Sakura) by pinfall	Tag team match	10:38
3	Maika defeated Mayu Iwatani by pinfall	Semifinals match in the Stardom 5Star Grand Prix tournament	11:44
4	Saya Kamitani defeated Hanan by pinfall	Semifinals match in the Stardom 5Star Grand Prix tournament	10:22
5	Anna Jay defeated Momo Kohgo by submission	Singles match	7:09
6	Xena defeated Saya Iida by pinfall	Singles match	8:57
7	Neo Genesis (AZM, Suzu Suzuki, Mei Seira, Miyu Amasaki and Starlight Kid) defeated God's Eye (Syuri, Saki Kashima, Lady C and Ranna Yagami) and Risa Sera	Ten-woman tag team match	13:11
8	Cosmic Angels (Natsupoi, Saori Anou and Yuna Mizumori) defeated H.A.T.E. (Konami, Thekla and Ruaka)	Six-woman tag team match	8:40
9	Rina (c) defeated Hina by submission	Singles match for the Future of Stardom Championship	14:28
10	Tam Nakano defeated Natsuko Tora (c) by pinfall	Singles match for the World of Stardom Championship	27:12
11	Maika defeated Saya Kamitani by pinfall	Stardom 5Star Grand Prix tournament final	27:23
(c) / – the champion(s) heading into the match; P / – the match was broadcast on the pre-show

== See also ==
- G1 Climax
- N-1 Victory
