= Stardom Sapporo World Rendezvous =

2024 World Wonder Ring Stardom event

- Left: Promotional poster for night one Right: Promotional poster for night two
- Promotion: World Wonder Ring Stardom
- Date: July 27–28, 2024
- City: Sapporo, Japan
- Venue: Chateraise Gateaux Kingdom Sapporo
- Attendance: Night 1: 701; Night 2: 732

Event chronology
← Previous; The Conversion	Next → 5 Star Grand Prix 2024

Sapporo World Rendezvous chronology
← Previous; First	Next → 2025

Stardom Sapporo World Rendezvous (スターダム サッポロワールドランデブー, Sutādamu sapporowārudorandebū) was two-night professional wrestling event promoted by World Wonder Ring Stardom. The event took place on July 27 and 28, 2024, in Sapporo at Chateraise Gateaux Kingdom Sapporo.

The card comprised a total of 17 matches, with nine on the first night and eight on the second, including one match on Night 1's pre-show and two on Night 2. Four of Stardom's ten championships were on the line. In the main event for Night 1, Natsupoi defeated Saori Anou to win the Wonder of Stardom Championship. In the main event for Night 2, Natsuko Tora defeated Maika to win the World of Stardom Championship, and announced both the dissolution of Oedo Tai and the formation of H.A.T.E.

== Production ==
=== Background ===
The show featured professional wrestling matches that result from scripted storylines, where wrestlers portray villains, heroes, or less distinguishable characters in the scripted events that build tension and culminate in a wrestling match or series of matches.

== Night 1 ==
=== Event ===
The first night of the event started with a preshow bout broadcast live on Stardom's YouTube channel in which Lady C and Hina picked up a win over one third of the Artist of Stardom Champions Xena and Rian.

The main card started with IWGP Women's Champion Mayu Iwatani picking up a victory over Hanako in singles competition. Next up, Saki Kashima defeated Aya Sakura in another singles match. Next up, Yuna Mizumori defeated Cosmic Angels stablemate Waka Tsukiyama to qualify in the last spot of the Stardom 5Star Grand Prix 2024's Red Block A side. Next up, Tam Nakano defeated Cosmic Angels stablemate Aya Sakura in singles competition. In the sixth bout of the night, the newly-created unit of Neo Genesis represented by Starlight Kid, AZM, Suzu Suzuki, Mei Seira and Miyu Amasaki defeated Hazuki, Koguma, Hanan, Saya Iida and Momo Kohgo of Stars in their very debut as a stable. After defecting God's Eye and turning on Syuri at their Goddess of Stardom Championship title defense four days prior of the event on July 23, 2024, Konami returned to Oedo Tai, the faction from which she emerged into God's Eye. Syuri teamed up with High Speed Champion Saya Kamitani, Mina Shirakawa and Maika to defeat Momo Watanabe, Thekla, Konami and Ruaka in eight-woman tag team action. In the semi main event, Rina defeated Ranna Yagami to secure the tenth consecutive defense of the Future of Stardom Championship in that respective reign which at the time was a record tier. After the bout concluded, Hina stepped in to furtherly challenge Rina.

In the main event, Natsupoi defeated Cosmic Angels stablemate Saori Anou to win the Wonder of Stardom Championship, ending the latter's reign at 12 days and no defenses, making it the shortest in the title's history at the time.

=== Results ===
Night 1 (July 27)
No.	Results	Stipulations	Times
1^{P}	God's Eye (Lady C and Hina) defeated Xena and Rian by pinfall	Tag team match	8:28
2	Mayu Iwatani defeated Hanako by pinfall	Singles match	12:16
3	Saki Kashima defeated Aya Sakura by pinfall	Singles match	0:26
4	Yuna Mizumori defeated Waka Tsukiyama by pinfall	5 Star Grand Prix A-Block qualifier	9:30
5	Tam Nakano defeated Sayaka Kurara by pinfall	Singles match	11:44
6	Neo Genesis (Starlight Kid, AZM, Suzu Suzuki, Mei Seira and Miyu Amasaki) defeated Stars (Hazuki, Koguma, Hanan, Saya Iida and Momo Kohgo) by pinfall	Ten-woman tag team match	15:50
7	Empress Nexus Venus (Mina Shirakawa and Maika), Saya Kamitani and Syuri defeated Oedo Tai (Momo Watanabe, Thekla, Konami and Ruaka)	Eight-woman tag team match by pinfall	13:55
8	Rina (c) defeated Ranna Yagami by pinfall	Singles match for the Future of Stardom Championship	12:16
9	Natsupoi defeated Saori Anou (c) by pinfall	Singles match for the Wonder of Stardom Championship	19:16
(c) / – the champion(s) heading into the match; P / – the match was broadcast on the pre-show

== Night 2 ==
=== Event ===
The preshow included two bouts which were broadcast live on Stardom's YouTube channel. In the first one, Yuna Mizumori defeated Momo Kohgo, Ruaka and Rian in four-way action, and in the second one, Mei Seira defeated Saya Kamitani to win the High Speed Championship, ending the latter's reign at 92 days and two defenses.

In the first main card bout, Miyu Amasaki defeated Lady C to claim the last spot of the Blue Block A in the Stardom 5Star Grand Prix 2024. Next up, Hanako picked up a victory over Sakura Aya in singles competition. In the fifth match, Mina Shirakawa, Xena and Waka Tsukiyama defeated the teams of Neo Genesis (Starlight Kid, AZM and Suzu Suzuki), Stars (Hazuki, Koguma and Saya Iida), Oedo Tai (Momo Watanabe, Thekla and Rina) and God's Eye (Saki Kashima, Hina and Ranna Yagami) in a tag team gauntlet match. The sixth match saw Syuri defeating Konami by disqualification after the latter attacked both Syuri and the referee with illegal weapons. In the seventh match, IWGP Women's Champion Mayu Iwatani and Hanan defeated Tam Nakano and Wonder of Stardom Champion Natsupoi in tag team competition.

In the main event, Natsuko Tora defeated Maika to win the World of Stardom Championship, ending the latter's reign at 212 days and six defenses. Tora received some help from Saya Kamitani who joined forces with her, abandoning Queen's Quest and thus declaring the stable's folding. After the bout concluded, Tora also announced the dissolution of Oedo Tai and the birth of the newly-created unit of H.A.T.E. featuring herself, Saya Kamitani, Momo Watanabe, Thekla, Konami, Rina and Ruaka.

=== Results ===
Night 2 (July 28)
No.	Results	Stipulations	Times
1^{P}	Yuna Mizumori defeated Momo Kohgo, Ruaka and Rian by pinfall	Four-way match	4:43
2^{P}	Mei Seira defeated Saya Kamitani (c) by pinfall	Singles match for the High Speed Championship	8:39
3	Miyu Amasaki defeated Lady C by pinfall	5 Star Grand Prix A-Block qualifier	11:04
4	Hanako defeated Aya Sakura by pinfall	Singles match	10:04
5	God's Eye (Saki Kashima, Ranna Yagami and Hina) defeated Empress Nexus Venus (Mina Shirakawa, Xena and Waka Tsukiyama), Neo Genesis (Starlight Kid, AZM and Suzu Suzuki), Stars (Hazuki, Koguma and Saya Iida), Oedo Tai (Momo Watanabe, Thekla and Rina) by pinfall	Four-way tag team gauntlet match	17:23
6	Syuri defeated Konami by disqualification	Singles match	8:05
7	Eye Contact (Mayu Iwatani and Hanan) defeated Cosmic Angels (Tam Nakano and Natsupoi) by pinfall	Tag team match	14:01
8	Natsuko Tora defeated Maika (c) by pinfall	Singles match for the World of Stardom Championship	19:45
(c) / – the champion(s) heading into the match; P / – the match was broadcast on the pre-show
