= H.A.T.E. (professional wrestling) =

Professional wrestling stable in World Wonder Ring Stardom

- Current logo of the stable (2024–present)

Stable
- Leader: Natsuko Tora
- Members: Momo Watanabe; Saya Kamitani; Konami; Ruaka; Rina; Fukigen Death; Azusa Inaba; Bea Priestley
- Former members: Thekla
- Debut: July 28, 2024
- Years active: 2024–present

H.A.T.E. (ヘイト, heito) (abbreviated from: Harass, Abuse, Terrorize, Eradicate) is a villainous professional wrestling stable mainly performing in the Japanese professional wrestling promotion World Wonder Ring Stardom. Led by Natsuko Tora, the stable also consists of Momo Watanabe, Saya Kamitani, Konami, Ruaka, Rina, Fukigen Death, Azusa Inaba and Bea Priestley.

== History ==
=== Formation (2024) ===
On the second night of the Stardom Sapporo World Rendezvous from July 28, 2024, Natsuko Tora defeated Maika to win the World of Stardom Championship with help from Saya Kamitani who attacked Maika, giving Tora momentum to pick up the victory. Kamitani declared Queen's Quest's dissolution, joining forces with Tora and the rest of the time's Oedo Tai members: Momo Watanabe, Thekla, Konami, Rina and Ruaka. Tora then declared the dissolution of Oedo Tai, as the assembled forces would instead be going by the newly created unit, H.A.T.E.

=== Championship reigns and pursuits (2024–present) ===
After winning the World of Stardom Championship at Stardom Sapporo World Rendezvous, Natsuko Tora gave up her spot in the Stardom 5 Star Grand Prix 2024 and granted it to Ruaka. The stable was also represented by Konami, Momo Watanabe, Saya Kamitani and Thekla in the competition. Kamitani made it to the finals, but was defeated by Maika. Tora also lost the World of Stardom Championship to Tam Nakano the same night, ending her reign at 34 days. Devil Princess (Rina and Azusa Inaba) lost the New Blood Tag Team Championship, which they won as part of Oedo Tai on July 23, 2024, to Empress Nexus Venus (Waka Tsukiyama and Rian) on December 26 at New Blood 17. H.A.T.E Supreme (Watanabe and Thekla) lost the Goddesses of Stardom Championship to wing★gori (Hanan and Saya Iida) at Dream Queendom on December 29. However, the faction later regained the World of Stardom Championship at the same event, when Saya Kamitani defeated Nakano.

On April 16, 2025, Tora and Konami lost to Neo Genesis (Starlight Kid and AZM) On All Star Grand Queendom, Kamitani retained the World of Stardom Championship against Nakano in a Career vs. Career match, Rina faced Yomiko Hotta in a losing effort, and Thekla lost a match against Sayaka Kurara. Due to the stipulation of the match, if Thekla had won, she would have got a match against Stardom president Taro Okada, but since Kurara won, Thekla was forced to join Cosmic Angels. Thekla refused and was fired instead after attacking Okada. On July 14 at Sareee-ISM Chapter VIII, Sareee and Takumi Iroha defeated BMI2000 (Tora and Ruaka) On July 24 at Nighter in Korakuen, BMI2000 defeated wing★gori (Hanan and Iida) to win the Goddesses of Stardom Championship. From July 27 till August 23, Tora, Kamitani, Rina, Ruaka, Azusa, Watanabe, and Konami participated in the Stardom 5 Star Grand Prix (Red Stars B, Red Stars A, Red Stars B, Blue Stars A, Red Stars A, Blue Stars B, and Blue Stars B respectively), with Tora, Ruaka, Azusa and Konami all failing to finish out of their blocks; Kamitani, Rina, and Watanabe all advanced out of their blocks, with Kamitani advancing directly to the quarterfinals ad Block leader, while Rina and Watanabe entered the playoffs. Rina defeated Bea Priestley, and Watanabe defeated Ami Sohrei to advance to the quarterfinals on August 20. On the same night in the quarterfinals, AZM defeated Kamitani, Rina defeated Natsupoi, and Watanabe defeated Sareee. On the final night of the tournament (August 23), Tora, Ruaka and Kamitani defeated Priestley and Stars (Hanan and Saya Iida, Rina was knocked out in the semifinals by AZM, while Watanabe defeated Saori Anou in the semifinals. On the same night, Watanabe defeated AZM in the finals to win her first 5 Star Grand Prix in her second finals appearance. At SEAdLINNNG 10th Anniversary on August 22, BMI2000 defeated Unagi Sayaka and Honori Hana. At Stardom Nighter In Korakuen on September 10, 2025, Konami, Rina and Fukigen Death defeated Neo Genesis (Starlight Kid, AZM and Miyu Amasaki) to win the Artist of Stardom Championship. At Stardom Nighter In Korakuen on September 27, Stars (Hanan, Iida and Priestley) defeated Watanabe, Konami and Fukigen by disqualification, God's Eye (Ami Sohrei, Lady C, and Kiyoka Kotatsu) defeated Tora, Ruaka and Rina, and Kamitani defeated AZM in a Winner Takes All match to win AZM's NJPW Strong Women's Championship and also retain her World of Stardom Championship. At Crimson Nightmare, Stars (Bea Priestley, Momo Kohgo and Saya Iida) defeated Tora, Ruaka and Rian in a six-woman tag team match, Konami defeated Starlight Kid to win the Wonder of Stardom Championship, and Kamitani defeated Watanabe to retain both the World of Stardom Championship and NJPW Strong Women's Championship.

On January 4, 2026 at NJPW Wrestle Kingdom 18, Kamitani lost the Strong Women's Championship to Syuri while also failing to win the IWGP Women's Championship in the process. On February 7 at Supreme Fight, Tora and Ruaka defeated Hanan and Bea Priestley to retain the Goddesses of Stardom Tag Team Championship, Konami defeated Ami Sohrei to retain the Wonder of Stardom Championship, and Kamitani defeated Starlight Kid to retain the World of Stardom Championship. On April 26 at All Star Grand Queendom, Tora and Ruaka lost the Goddesses of Stardom Championship to 02line (AZM and Miyu Amasaki), Konami lost the Wonder of Stardom Championship to Hanan; post-match Bea Priestley turned on Hanan and joined H.A.T.E., and Kamitani lost the World of Stardom Championship to Sayaka Kurara.

=== Independent circuit (2024–present) ===
Konami and Watanabe along with Medusa Complex (Charli Evans and Millie McKenzie) defeated Alex Windsor, Kanji, Emersyn Jayne and Skye Smitson at EVE 128: Halloween Forever on November 1, 2024.

== Members ==
H.A.T.E.
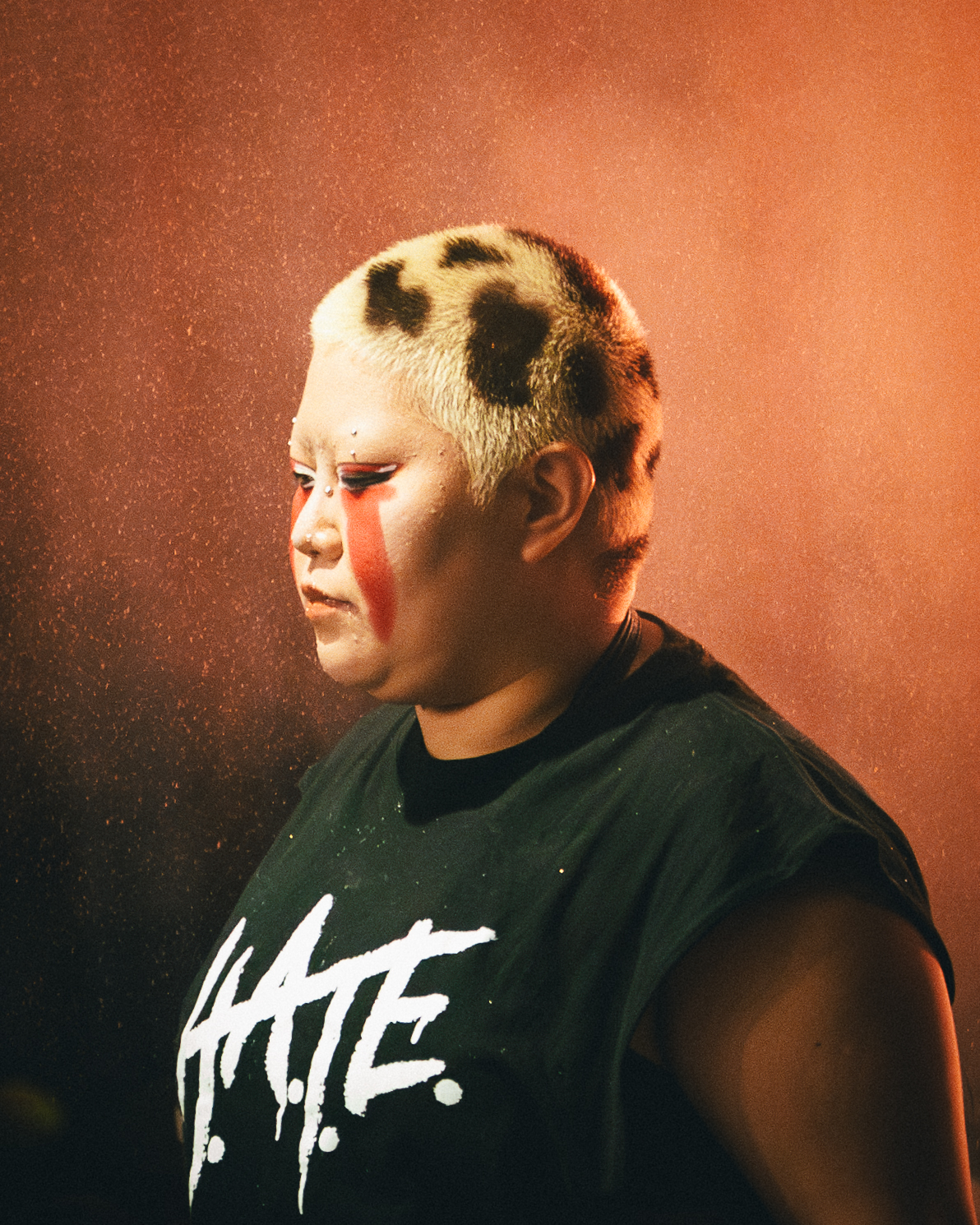
Natsuko Tora (I)

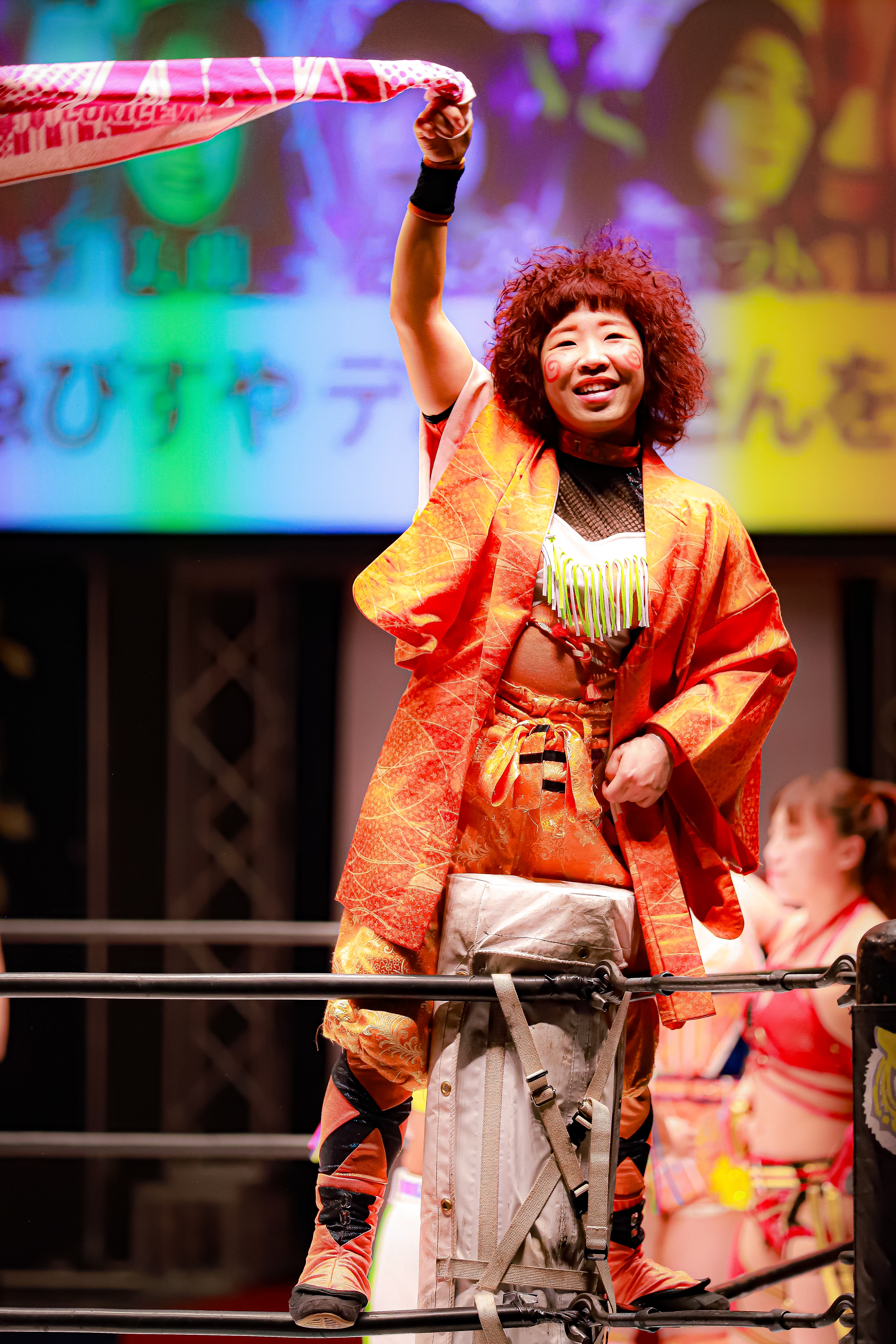
Fukigen Death

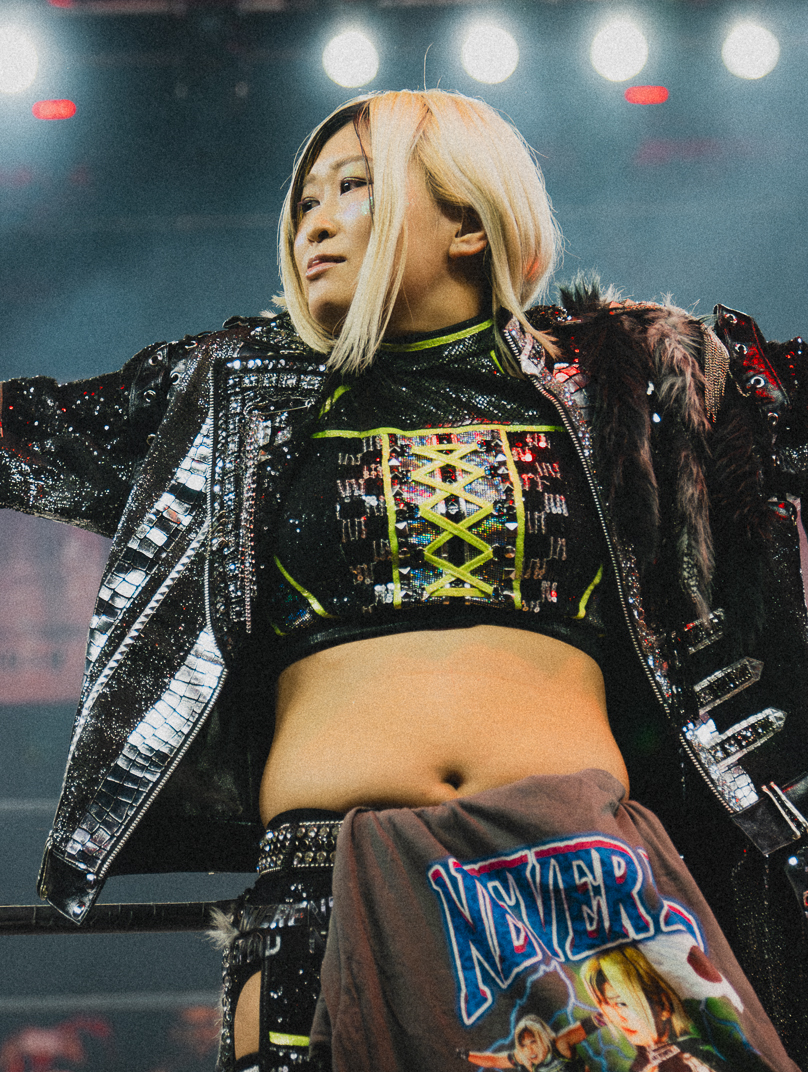
Konami

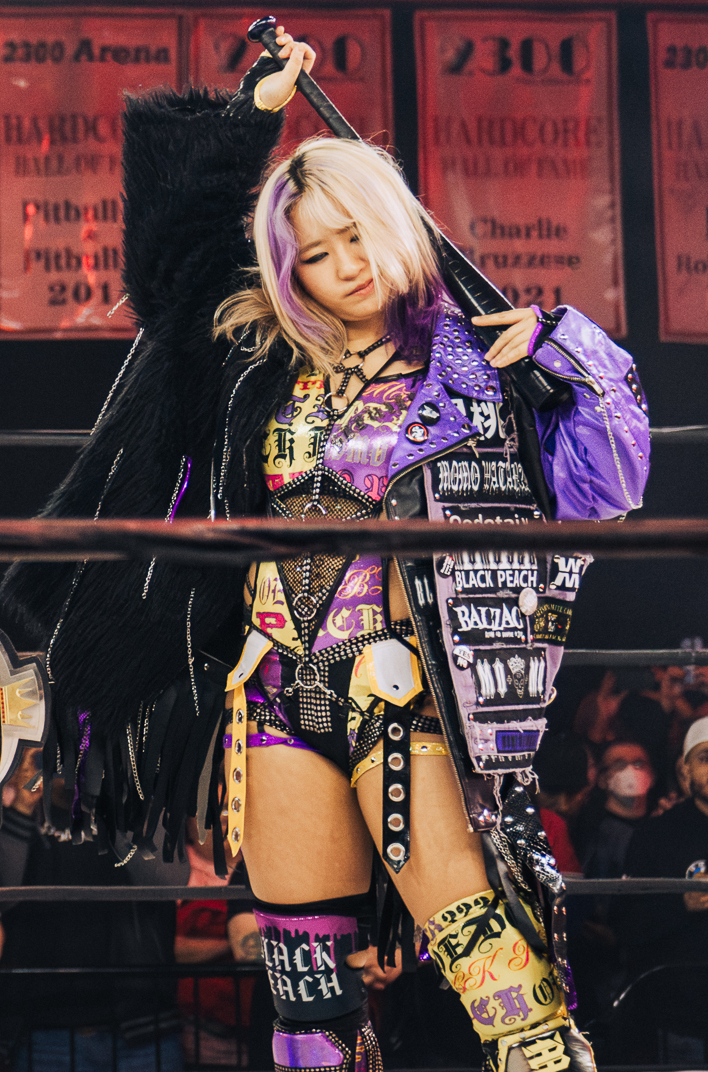
Momo Watanabe

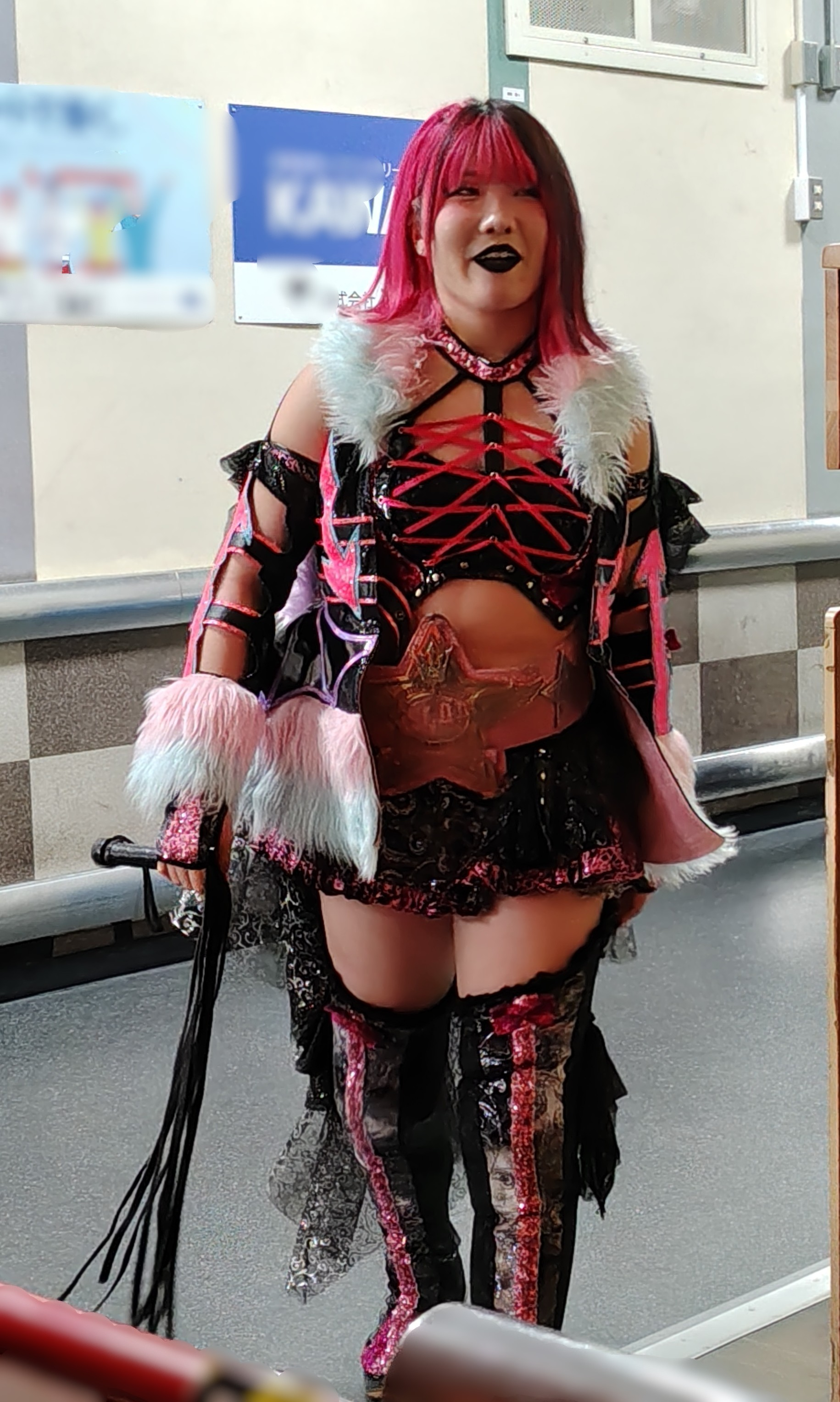
Rina

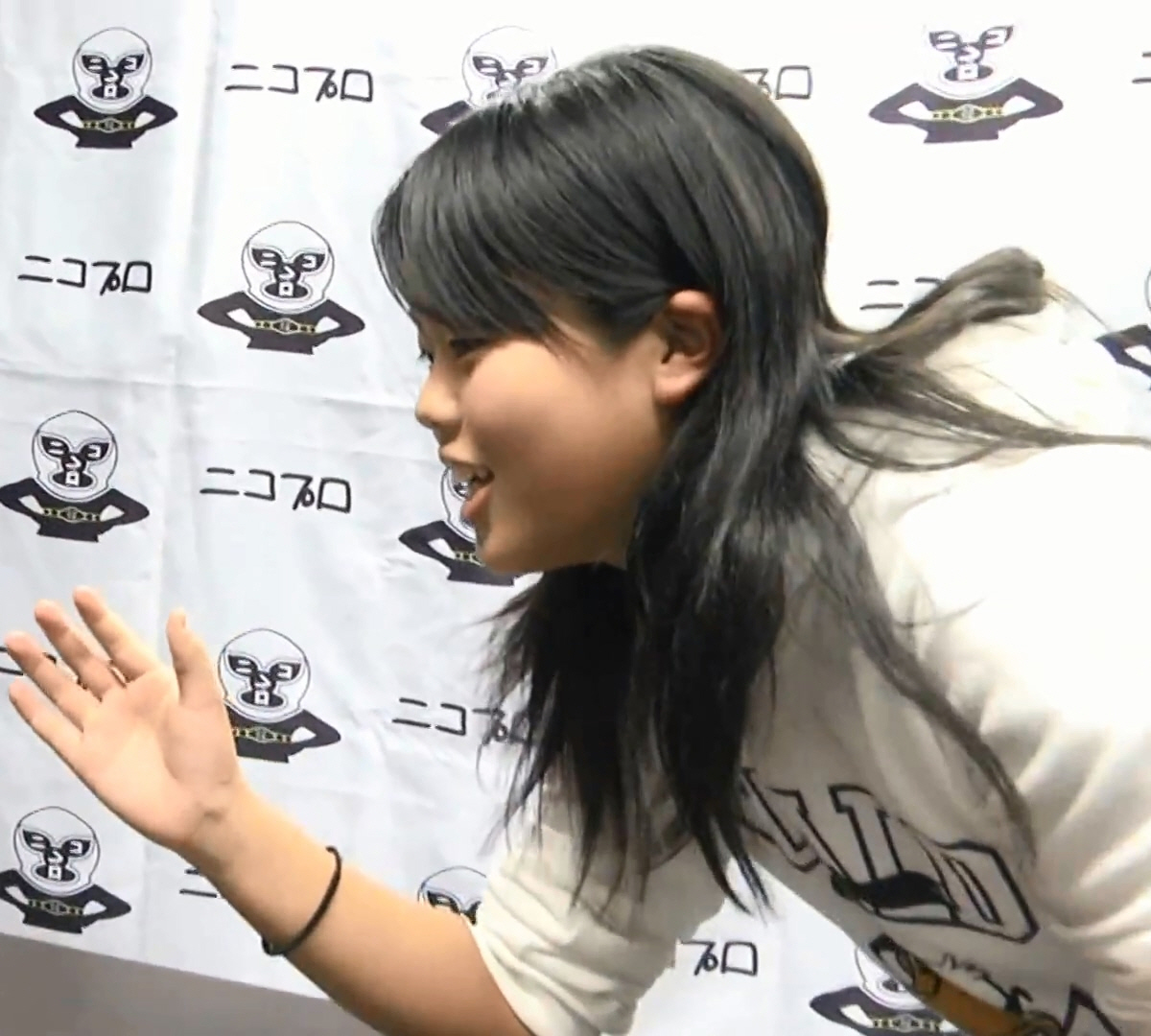
Ruaka

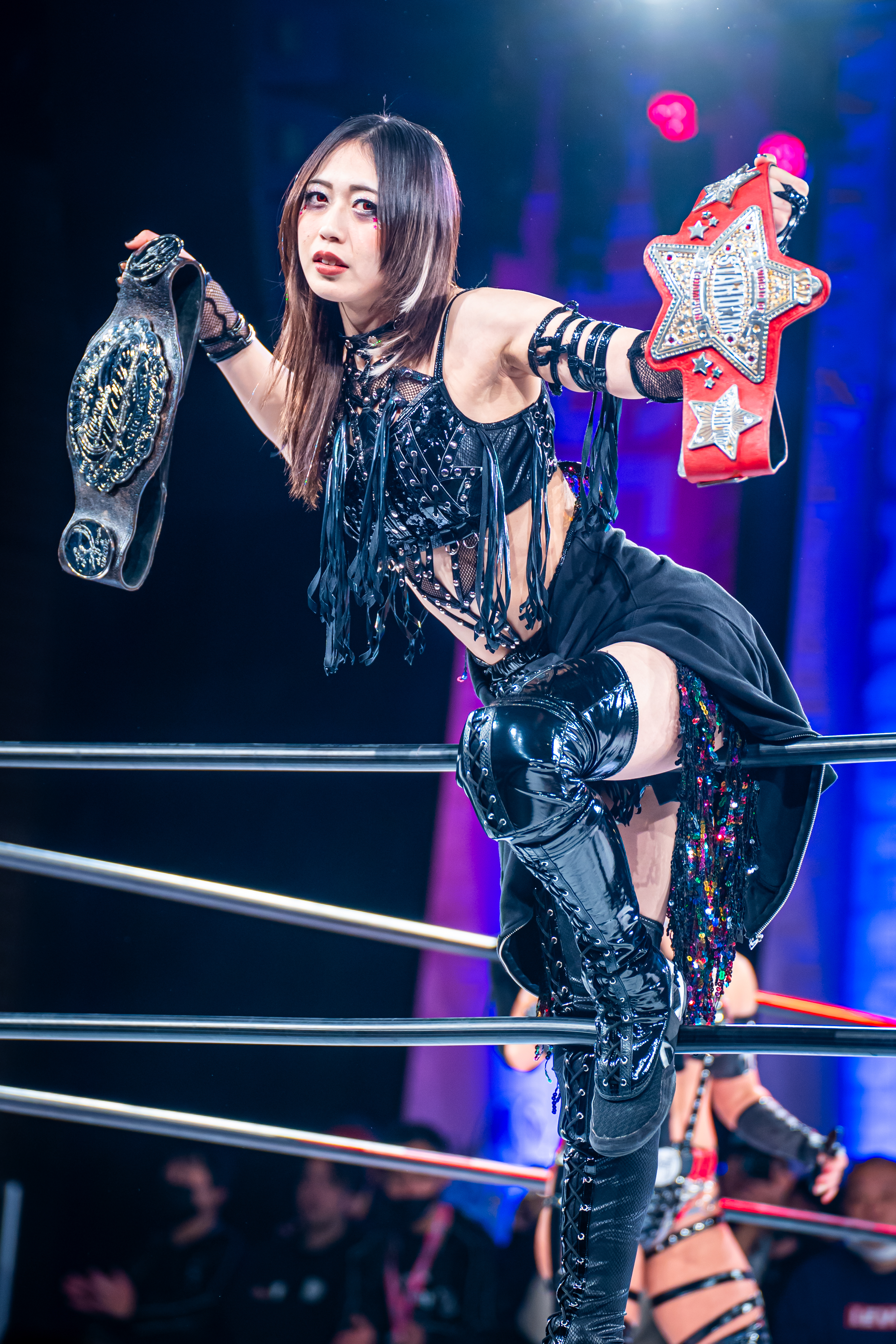
Saya Kamitani

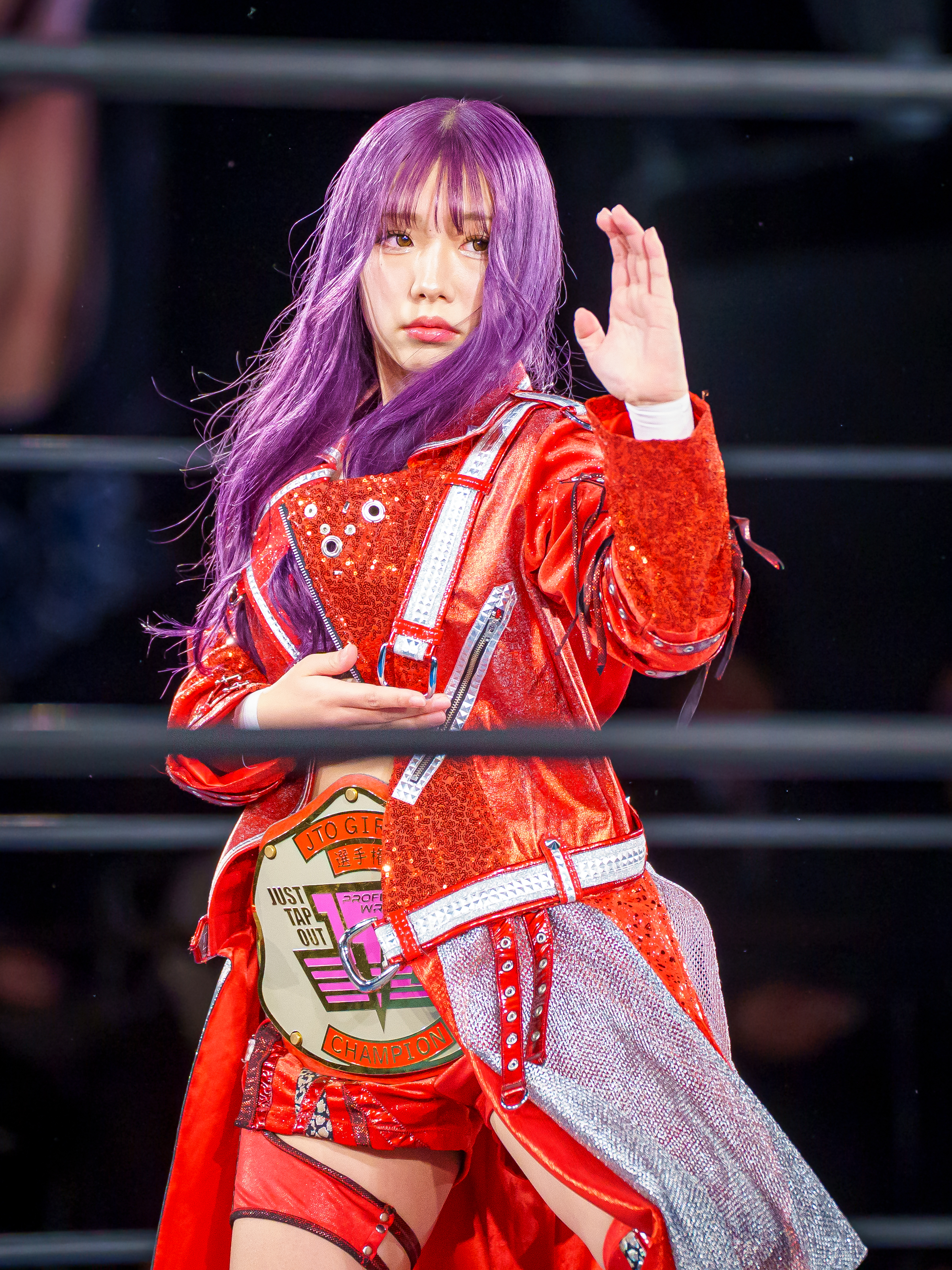
Azusa Inaba

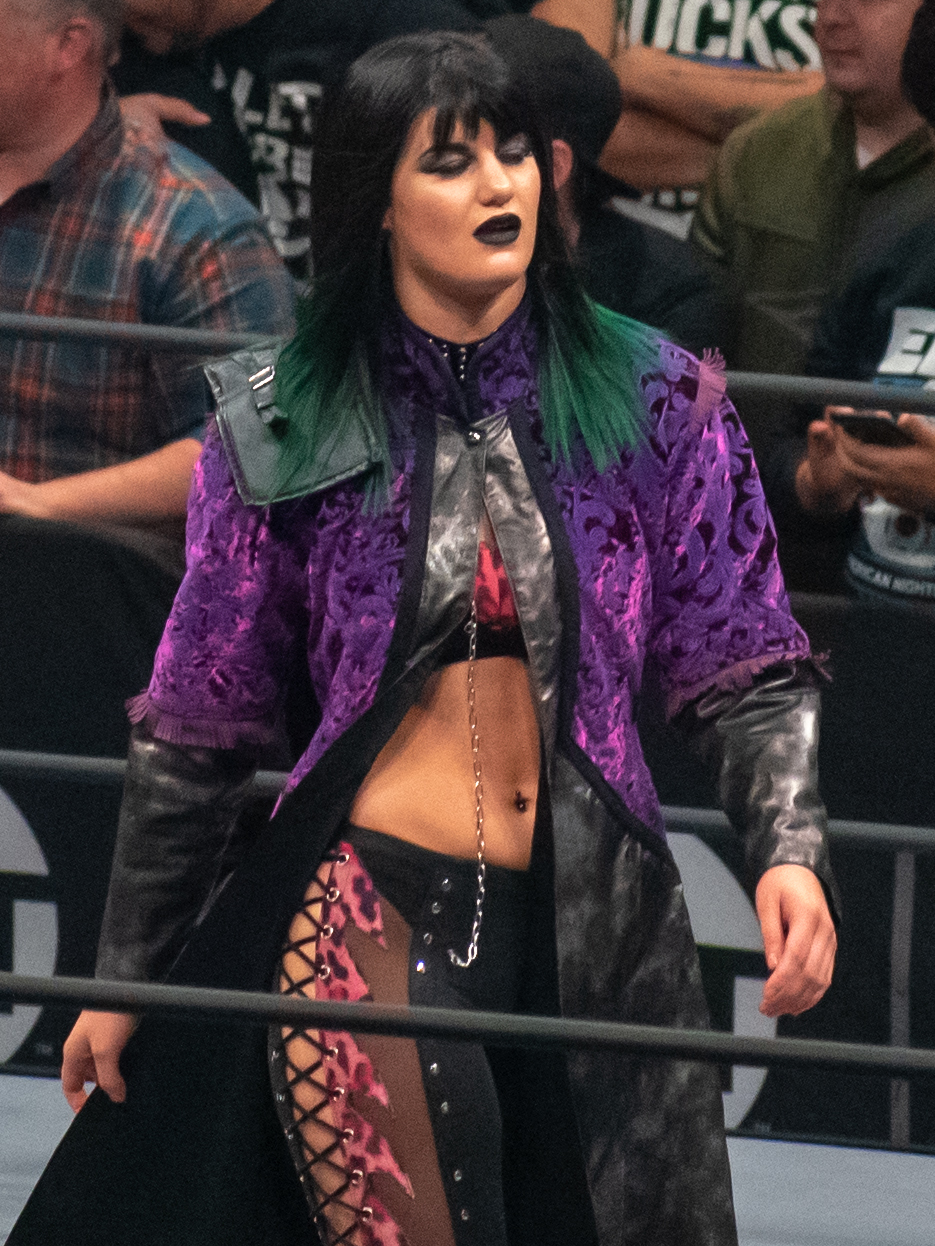
Bea Priestley

| * | Founding member |
| I | Leader |

=== Current ===
| Member | | Joined |
|---|---|---|
| Natsuko Tora | *I | July 28, 2024 |
| Fukigen Death | * | July 28, 2024 |
| Konami | * | July 28, 2024 |
| Momo Watanabe | * | July 28, 2024 |
| Rina | * | July 28, 2024 |
| Ruaka | * | July 28, 2024 |
| Saya Kamitani | * | July 28, 2024 |
| Azusa Inaba (Note: Inaba joined the stable as an associate member on July 28, 2024 before being accepted as an official member on September 13, 2024.) | | September 13, 2024 |
| Bea Priestley | | April 26, 2026 |

=== Former ===
| Member | | Joined | Left |
|---|---|---|---|
| Thekla | * | July 28, 2024 | April 27, 2025 |

== Sub-groups ==
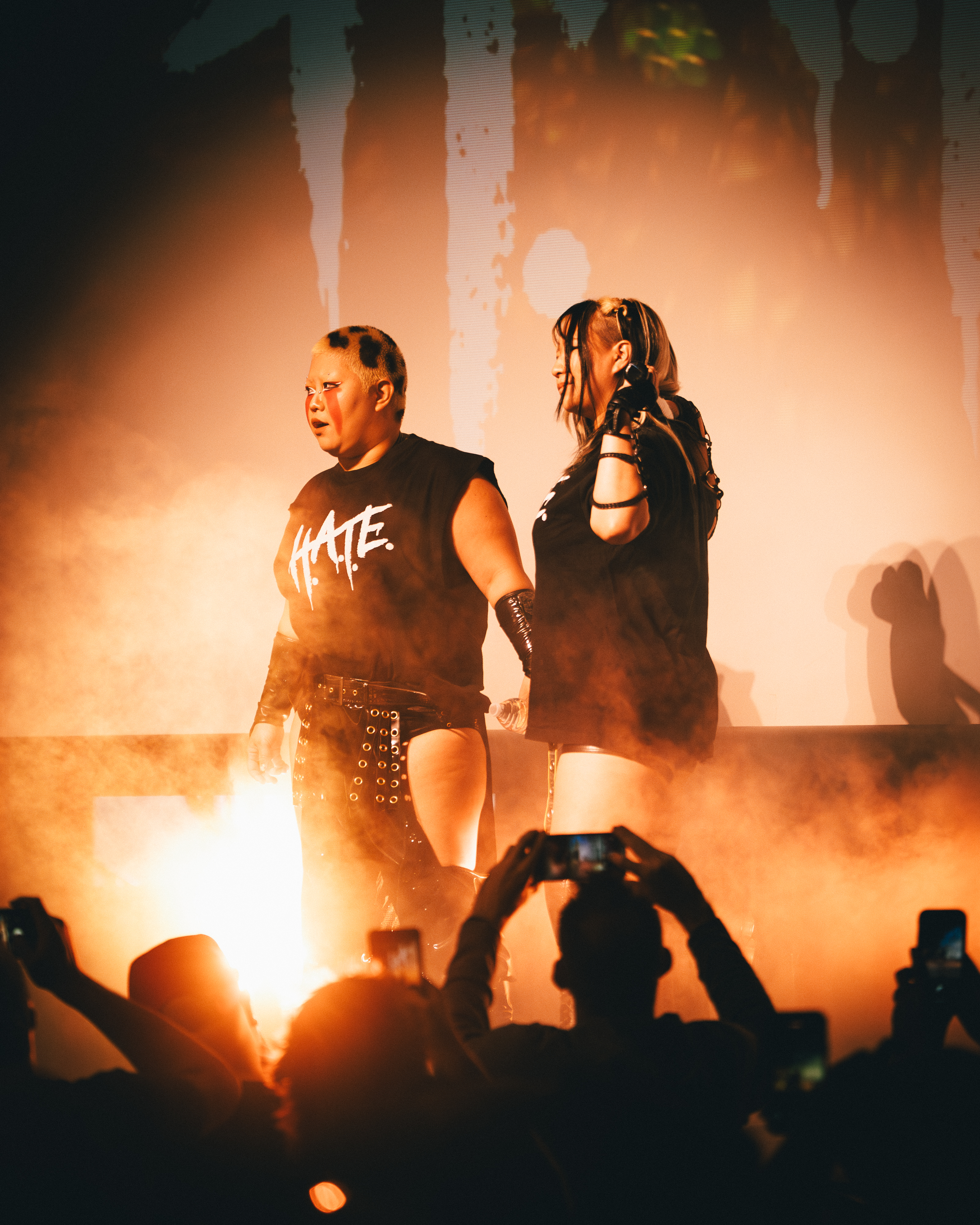
XL (Momo Watanabe and Natsuko Tora) in April 2025.

=== Current ===
| Affiliate | Members | Tenure | Type |
|---|---|---|---|
| BMI2000 | Natsuko Tora; Ruaka | 2024–present | Tag team |
| XL | Momo Watanabe; Natsuko Tora | 2024–present | Tag team |
| Devil Princess | Rina; Azusa Inaba | 2024–present | Tag team |
| PsyQueen | Saya Kamitani; Konami | 2024–present | Tag team |
| BlackSwan | Saya Kamitani; Momo Watanabe | 2026 | Tag team |

=== Former ===
| Affiliate | Members | Tenure | Type |
|---|---|---|---|
| H.A.T.E. Supreme | Momo Watanabe; Thekla | 2024–2025 | Tag team |

== Championships and accomplishments ==
- New Japan Pro-Wrestling
  - Strong Women's Championship (1 time) – Kamitani
- Ice Ribbon
  - Triangle Ribbon Championship (1 time) – Death
- Pro Wrestling Illustrated
  - Ranked Kamitani No. 3 of the top 250 female singles wrestlers in the PWI Women's 250 in 2025
  - Ranked Tora No. 43 of the top 250 female singles wrestlers in the PWI Women's 250 in 2024
  - Ranked Rina No. 58 of the top 250 female singles wrestlers in the PWI Women's 250 in 2024
  - Ranked Inaba No. 130 of the top 250 female singles wrestlers in the PWI Women's 250 in 2025
- Pro Wrestling Wave
  - Wave Single Championship (1 time) – Kamitani
- Professional Wrestling Just Tap Out
  - Queen of JTO Championship (1 time, current) – Inaba
  - JTO Girls Championship (2 time, current) – Inaba
  - JTO Girls Tag Team Championship (1 time) – Inaba with Aoi
  - The Second Grand Slam Champion – Inaba
  - JTO Girls Tournament (2025) - Inaba
- World Wonder Ring Stardom
  - Artist of Stardom Championship (1 time) – Konami, Rina & Death
  - World of Stardom Championship (2 times) – Tora (1) and Kamitani (1 time)
  - Wonder of Stardom Championship (1 time) – Konami
  - Goddesses of Stardom Championship (2 times) – Watanabe and Thekla (1), Tora and Ruaka (1)
  - New Blood Tag Team Championship (1 time) – Rina and Inaba
  - Future of Stardom Championship (1 time) – Rina
  - Stardom 5Star Grand Prix Tournament
    - (2025) – Momo Watanabe
    - (2026) – Rina
  - 5★Star GP Awards (13 times)
    - Blue Stars Best Match Award (2024) vs. Suzu Suzuki on August 20 in Blue Stars B – Thekla
    - Blue Stars Best Match Award (2025) vs. Sareee on July 27 in Blue Stars B – Konami
    - Blue Stars Best Match Award (2026) vs. Saya Kamitani on August 3 in Blue Stars B - Watanabe
    - Blue Stars Best Match Award (2026) vs. Momo Watanabe on August 3 in Blue Stars B - Kamitani
    - Red Stars Best Match Award (2024) vs. Mayu Iwatani on August 15 in Red Stars B – Watanabe
    - Red Stars Best Match Award (2025) vs. Natsuko Tora on August 2 in Red Stars B – Rina
    - Red Stars Best Match Award (2025) vs. Rina on August 2 in Red Stars B – Tora
    - Technique/Skill Award (2025) - Rina
    - Technique/Skill Award (2026) - Ruaka
    - Fighting Spirit Award (2025) - Rina
    - Best Match Award (2025) vs. AZM on August 23 - Rina
    - Best Match Award (2026) vs. Konami on August 18 - Rina
    - Best Match Award (2026) vs. Rina on August 18 - Konami
  - Stardom Year-End Award (8 times)
    - Best Match Award vs. Mayu Iwatani - Watanabe (2024)
    - Fighting Spirit Award – Watanabe (2024)
    - Special Merit Award - Kamitani (2024)
    - MVP Award – Kamitani (2025)
    - Best Match Award – Kamitani vs. Tam Nakano (2025)
    - Best Tag Team Award – Tora and Ruaka (2025)
    - Best Unit Award (2025)
    - Shining Award – Kamitani (2025)
