= Tam Nakano =

Japanese professional wrestler

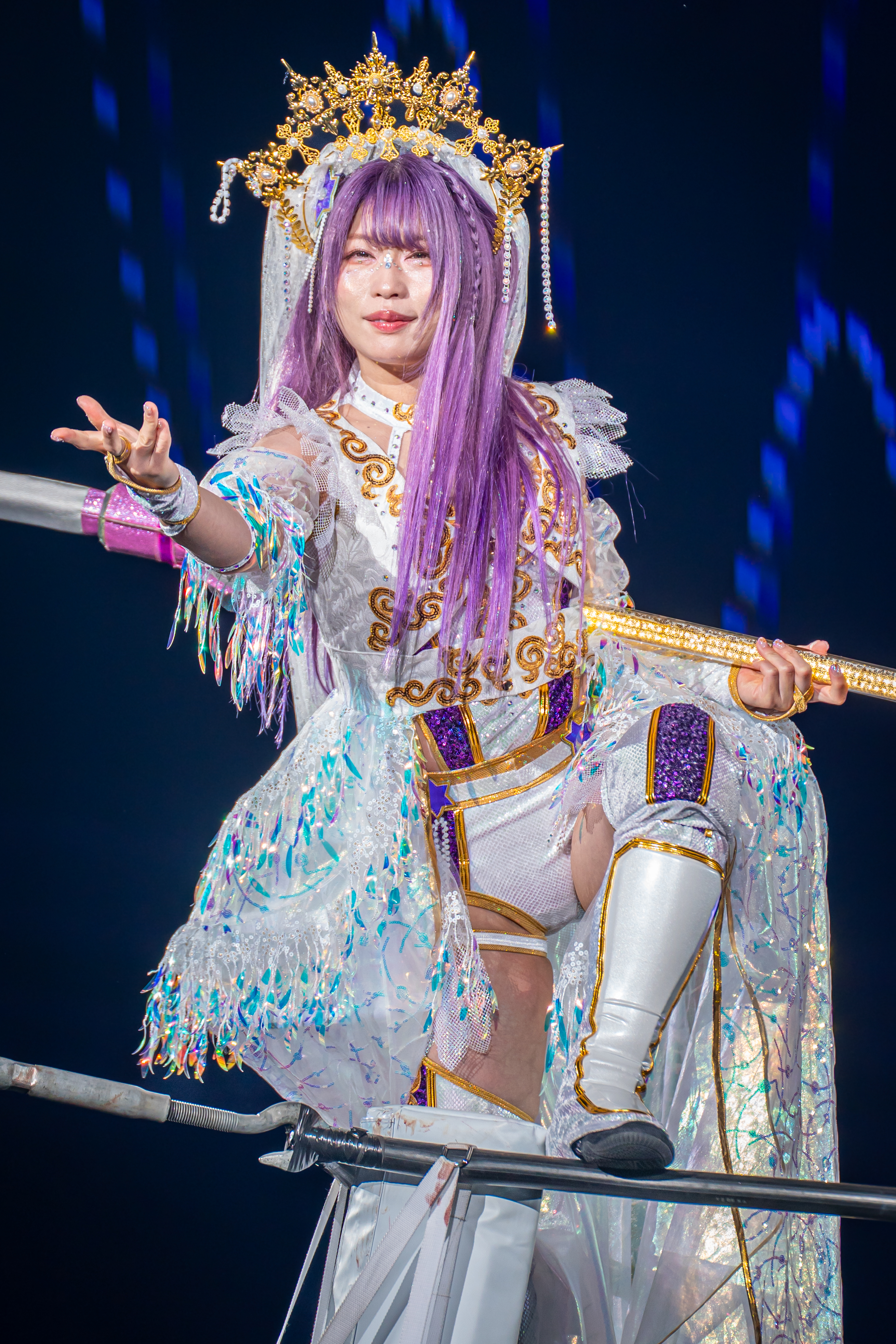
- Tam Nakano in April 2025

Personal information
- Born: Yuria Tauchi; March 22, 1988 (age 38) Anjō, Japan

Professional wrestling career
- Ring name(s): Tam Nakano; Dame de Panko
- Billed height: 157 cm (5 ft 2 in)
- Billed weight: 56 kg (123 lb)
- Trained by: Mayu Iwatani
- Debut: July 18, 2016
- Retired: April 27, 2025

Yuria Tauchi (田内 友里愛, Tauchi Yuria; born March 22, 1988), better known by her ring name Tam Nakano (中野 たむ, Nakano Tamu) is a Japanese retired professional wrestler and idol. She is best known for her time in World Wonder Ring Stardom, where she was a former leader of Cosmic Angels.

Nakano began her career as an idol with Actwres girl'Z in 2015, and made her debut as a professional wrestler the following year. She left the promotion in 2017 and began working for Frontier Martial Arts Wrestling (FMW) and Stardom as a freelancer, officially signing with Stardom later that year.

In Stardom, along with Mina Shirakawa and Unagi Sayaka, she founded and led the Cosmic Angels stable until her retirement. She went on to become a two-time World of Stardom Champion, two-time Wonder of Stardom Champion, one-time Goddesses of Stardom Champion, and four-time Artist of Stardom Champion.

Nakano also won the 2019 Goddesses of Stardom Tag League and received the 2023 Tokyo Sports Women's Wrestling Grand Prize.

== Early life ==
Yuria Tauchi was born in Anjō on March 22, 1988. She began dancing and performing from the age of 3 and trained in ballet. She went on to graduate from a theatre-focused vocational school. Originally, she worked as a musical dancer and dance instructor, and worked part-time to supplement her dance career. She auditioned to be a theme park dancer at Tokyo Disneyland and Sanrio Puroland, but failed to pass.

She joined the underground idol group "Katamomi Girls" from their inception in 2012 until her graduation in 2015. Her life as an underground idol was difficult, and in interviews she mentioned frequent arguments with management and live shows "where the number of [group] members equaled the number of customers".

Along with some former members of Katamomi Girls, she formed and produced idol group "info.m@te" and performed under the stage name Tam Nakano (中野 たむ, Nakano Tamu) until their disbandment in 2016.

During her time in info.m@te, she worked at Actwres girl'Z shows as an idol, a choreographer and dancer. She became interested in professional wrestling after watching a match between Natsumi Maki and Saori Anou and decided to become a trainee.

== Professional wrestling career ==
=== Actwres Girl’z and freelancing (2016–2017) ===
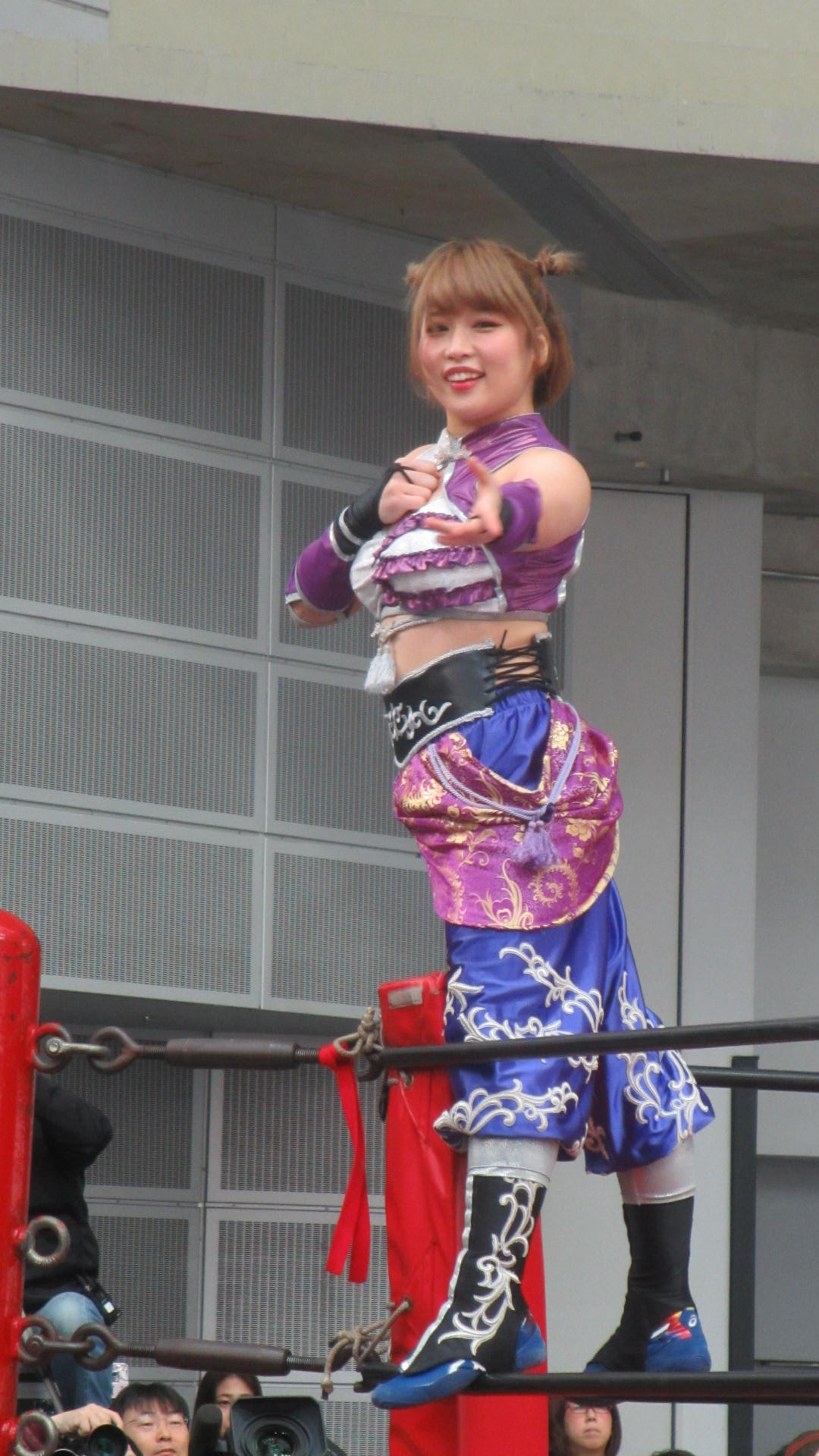
Nakano in December 2016

As a trainee, her talent was recognized by Yumiko Hotta and she subsequently made her debut under the ring name Tam Nakano (中野 たむ, Nakano Tamu) on July 24, 2016, losing to Saori Anou. Nakano continued to regularly compete in Actwres girl'Z until June 2017, when she announced she would be leaving the promotion to become a freelancer. Nakano's first match as a freelancer took place 2 days later, when she and Manami Katsu defeated Miss Koharu and Miss Mongol.

=== World Wonder Ring Stardom (2017–2025) ===
Nakano appeared at the World Wonder Ring Stardom show in Korakuen Hall on July 16, 2017, and announced her intentions to compete in the 2017 5★STAR GP. On August 13, Nakano qualified for the tournament after defeating Natsuko Tora. Nakano finished the tournament with 1 win and two points, unable to advance to the finals.

==== Oedo Tai (2017–2018) ====
On September 9, Nakano turned heel for the first time in her career, joining the villainous Oedo Tai faction. In October, Nakano suffered an injury and was unable to compete, but continued to appear with Oedo Tai as a manager, and introduced her mascot, a stuffed panda known as Producer P. On November 1, Nakano officially signed with the promotion. On January 21, 2018, as a result of being the last person eliminated in a special Queen's Quest vs Oedo Tai gauntlet match, Nakano was kicked out of Oedo Tai.

==== Stars (2018–2020) ====
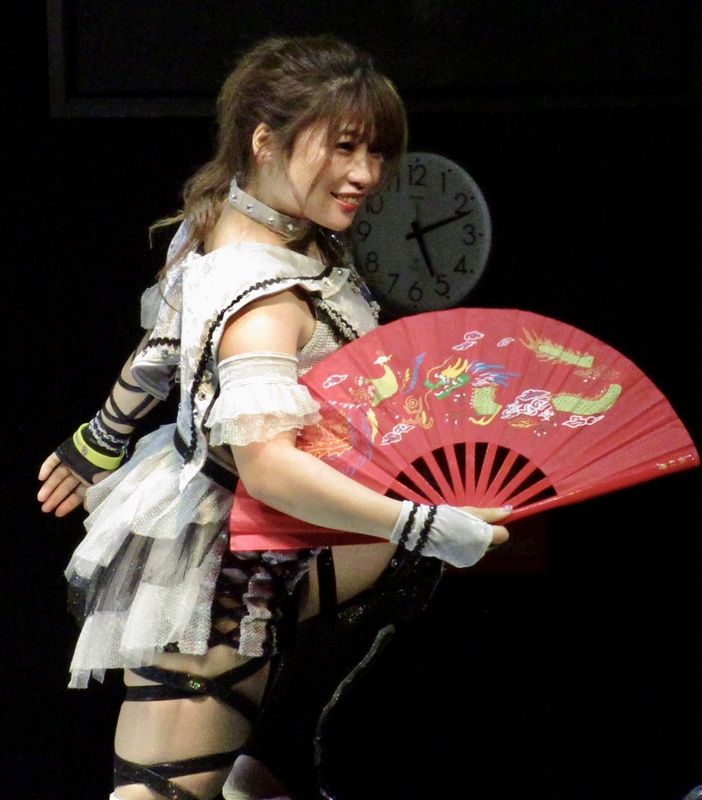
Nakano in December 2019

She subsequently turned face and began teaming with Mayu Iwatani. On February 18, the duo unsuccessfully challenged Tam's former stablemates Hana Kimura and Kagetsu for the Goddesses of Stardom Championship. On April 1 at Stardom Dream Slam 2018 in Nagoya, Nakano teamed with Stardom ace Io Shirai to defeat Oedo Tai (Kagetsu and Sumire Natsu) in a current blast exploding bat deathmatch. On September 30, Nakano, along with Iwatani and Saki Kashima, defeated J.A.N. (Jungle Kyona, Natsuko Tora and Kaori Yoneyama) to win the Artist of Stardom Championship, Nakano's first title in professional wrestling. At Mask Fiesta 2018 on October 28, Nakano, under the ring name Dame de Panko, teamed up with La Gatita and Mayuchica to defeat Bear Dog, Black Jungle Fairy and Night Bear.

In the 2019 Cinderella Tournament, Nakano faced her former stablemate Kagetsu in the first round. The match ended in a time-limit draw, eliminating both wrestlers. On May 16, Iwatani, Kashima and Nakano lost the Artist of Stardom Championship to Tokyo Cyber Squad (Kimura, Konami and Kyona), ending their reign at 228 days. On June 16, Nakano challenged Arisa Hoshiki for the Wonder of Stardom Championship, but was unsuccessful. Nakano, along with Iwatani and Kashima, won back the title on June 23, however, lost it in the next month on July 20. On November 15, Nakano, along with Hoshiki, won the annual Goddesses of Stardom Tag League, when they defeated Bea Priestley and Jamie Hayter in the finals. After winning the Tag League, Hoshiki and Nakano challenged Konami and Kyona on November 24 for the Goddesses of Stardom Championship, but were unsuccessful.

In July 2020, a feud began between Nakano and Giulia, initially for the Wonder of Stardom Championship, that would continue intermittently for several years. On July 26, at Cinderella Summer in Tokyo, Nakano lost to Giulia in the finals of a tournament for the vacant Wonder of Stardom Championship. On October 3, Nakano challenged Giulia again for the Wonder of Stardom Championship, however, was unsuccessful in the second time.

==== Stardom Idols (2018) ====
During her time in Stars, Nakano launched "Stardom Idols", a sister promotion of Stardom, where the roster of 15 idols would perform original music combined with wrestling at their own shows, with Nakano serving as General Manager.

Stardom Idols was short-lived, but two participants, Itsuki Hoshino and Saya Kamitani, passed Stardom's pro-test and joined the main roster. Kamitani would go on to become one of Stardom's top stars and face Nakano in her retirement match.

==== Cosmic Angels leadership and retirement (2020–2025) ====
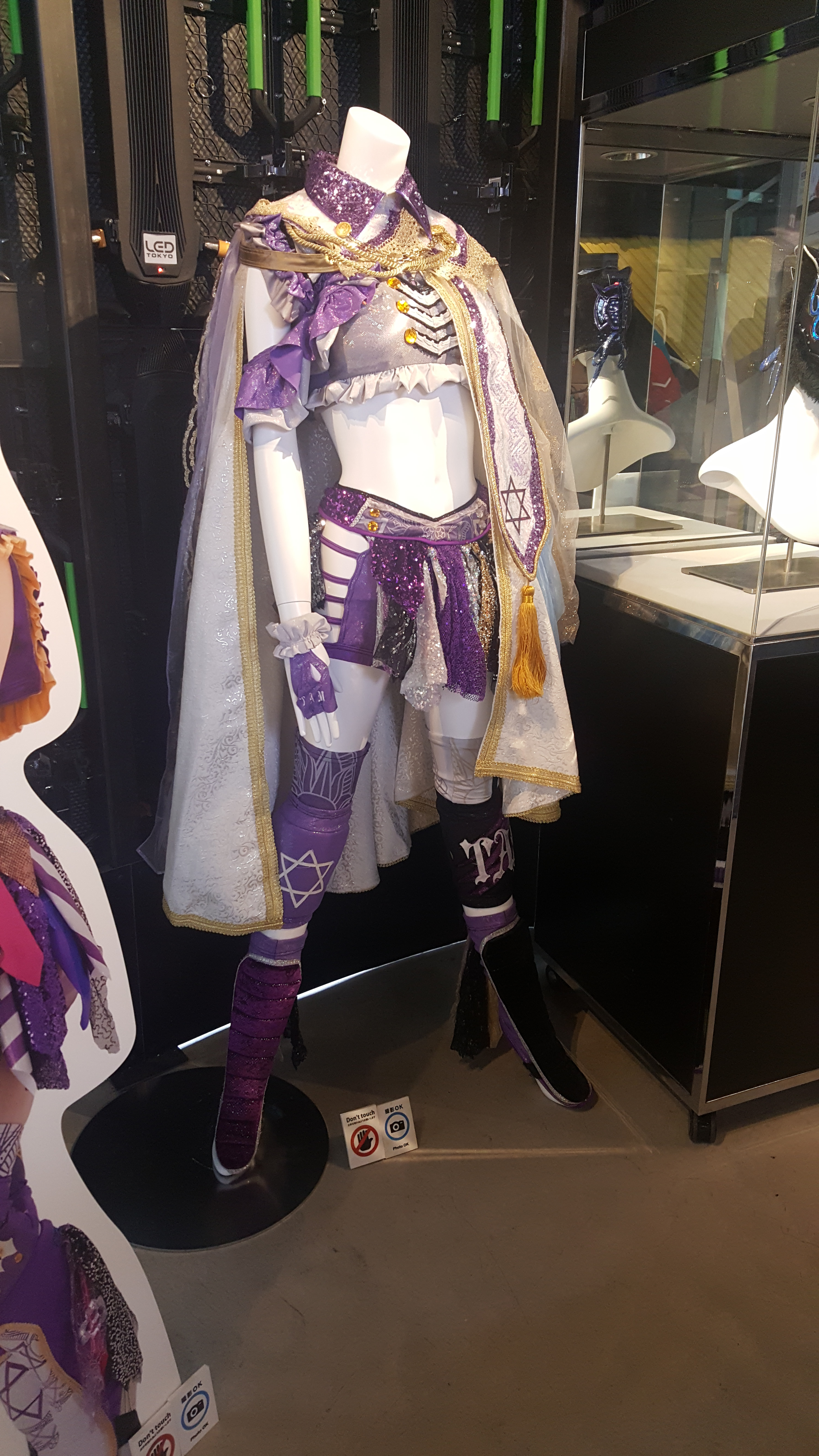
Nakano's ring gear in Stardom's pop-up Tokyo store in November 2021

On November 15, Nakano, along with fellow Stars members Mina Shirakawa and Unagi Sayaka formed a new group within Stars named "Cosmic Angels", as the trio defeated Kashima, Rina and Tora. On December 16, Cosmic Angels defeated Kashima, Priestley and Tora to win the Artist of Stardom Championship. On December 20, after Cosmic Angels had their first successful title defense against Gokigen Death, Iwatani and Starlight Kid, Iwatani announced that Cosmic Angels are leaving Stars to be their own unit.

On March 3, 2021, at All Star Dream Cinderella, Nakano defeated Giulia in a Hair vs. Hair match to win the Wonder of Stardom Championship, her first singles title in the promotion. She held the title until Dream Queendom, where she was defeated by Saya Kamitani, ending her reign at 301 days.

On June 26, 2022, Nakano faced Natsupoi in the first steel cage match at Stardom, which Nakano was victorious. On July 9, during a multi-woman match, Natsupoi betrayed her own unit Donna Del Mondo by attacking their leader Giulia, Nakano's rival, and joined Nakano's Cosmic Angel unit, thus turning face in the process. On July 9, at Mid Summer Champions in Nagoya, Nakano had her first match for the World of Stardom Championship where she challenged Syuri for the title, but was unsuccessful. On August 21, at Stardom x Stardom: Nagoya Midsummer Encounter, Nakano alongside Natsupoi defeated FWC (Hazuki and Koguma) to win the Goddesses of Stardom Championship. Together, now known as meltear, Nakano and Natsupoi had two successful title defenses before losing the championship to 7Upp (Nanae Takahashi and Yuu), on December 29, at Dream Queendom 2022, ending their reign at 130 days.

At All Star Grand Queendom 2023 held on April 23 at Yokohama Arena, Nakano defeated Giulia to win the World of Stardom Championship for the first time in her career. Nakano marked her first defense of the title at Flashing Champions 2023, when she defeated Mina Shirakawa in a Winner Takes All match to retain her World Championship and win the Wonder of Stardom Championship for the second time. On July 2, at Mid Summer Champions 2023, Nakano lost the Wonder of Stardom Championship to Mirai, ending her second reign at 36 days. At Stardom x Stardom: Osaka Summer Team on August 13, Nakano successfully defended her World of Stardom Championship over Megan Bayne.

During her match against Natsuko Tora at Nagoya Golden Fight 2023, Nakano injured her knee while successfully defending her title. On November 20, then-executive producer Rossy Ogawa announced that the World of Stardom Championship would be vacated due to the severity of Nakano's injury, with a new champion crowned at Dream Queendom 2023. Nakano made her return at Supreme Fight 2024, teaming up with Yuna Mizumori to defeat Mina Shirakawa and Waka Tsukiyama. On the final night of the 2024 Cinderella Tournament, she faced Giulia for what became the final match in their rivalry, ending in a time-limit draw.

At Stardom in Hamamatsu, Nakano, along with Natsupoi and Saori Anou, won the Artist of Stardom Championship after defeating Empress Nexus Venus (Mina Shirakawa, Maika, and Xena). After the match, Natsuko Tora, along with her recently formed stable H.A.T.E., entered the ring to taunt Nakano about her ambitions and injuring her leg the previous year. After a brief fight, Tora trapped Nakano's weakened leg using a chair and repeatedly struck it with a steel pipe. While Saya Kamitani pinned her down, Tora cut Nakano's hair, declaring war between Cosmic Angels and H.A.T.E. The following week at a show in Shibuya, Nakano, along with Natsupoi, faced Tora and Rina in a match where Tora continued to attack Nakano's injured knee.

Nakano entered the 2024 5 Star Grand Prix with her knee still weakened and started poorly, losing her first three matches. After her loss to AZM, Tora taunted Nakano and challenged her to a match for the World of Stardom Championship. Nakano was subsequently eliminated from the tournament, finishing at the bottom of Red Stars B with 0 points. During the final night of the 5 Star Grand Prix on August 31, Nakano defeated Tora to win the World of Stardom Championship for the second time.

On December 29 at Dream Queendom, Nakano lost the title to Saya Kamitani ending her reign at 120 days. On February 24, 2025 at Stardom Path of Thunder, Nakano teamed with Sayaka Kurara to defeat Kamitani and Tora. Per the stipulation, Kamitani was forced to grant any request Nakano wanted, with the latter challenging Kamitani to a Loser Leaves Stardom match on March 3. On March 3 at Stardom Nighter, Kamitani defeated Nakano, but would grant Nakano one last opportunity at the World of Stardom Championship at Stardom All Star Grand Queendom 2025 on April 27 in a Career vs. Career match. On March 4 at a press conference, Nakano announced that her Stardom contract had been (kayfabe) terminated, but would continue to perform from the promotion as a freelancer.

On April 27 at Stardom All Star Grand Queendom 2025, Nakano lost to Kamitani and was forced to retire from professional wrestling. The match was notably awarded a 5.25 star rating by Dave Meltzer of the Wrestling Observer Newsletter.

=== New Japan Pro-Wrestling (2021–2024) ===
On January 5, 2021, at the second night of New Japan Pro-Wrestling (NJPW)'s Wrestle Kingdom 15, Nakano made her first NJPW appearance where she, alongside Mayu Iwatani, lost to Giulia and Syuri in a dark match. On August 8, 2022, at the second night of Wrestle Kingdom 16, Nakano had her first match on the main card of NJPW, where she alongside Saya Kamitani defeated Iwatani and Starlight Kid. On November 20, 2022, Nakano participated in the first NJPW and Stardom collaboration event, Historic X-Over, in an eight-person mixed tag team match, where Nakano alongside Natsupoi (as meltear) and Suzuki-gun (Taichi and Yoshinobu Kanemaru) defeated the teams of Black Desire (Momo Watanabe and Starlight Kid) and Suzuki-gun (El Desperado and Douki).

On January 4, 2023, on the first night of Wrestle Kingdom 17, Nakano challenged the inaugural IWGP Women's Champion Kairi for the title, but was unsuccessful.

At Forbidden Door on June 30, 2024, Nakano and Willow Nightingale defeated Kris Statlander and Momo Watanabe on the Zero Hour show.

== Other ventures ==
Tauchi is trained in kung fu, which she often referenced with her ring attire and wrestling style.

Tauchi released her first EP alongside fellow wrestler Natsupoi, Tears Tail, on April 19, 2023.

Tauchi competed in the 42nd SASUKE tournament, where she failed the third obstacle of the first stage.

== Championships and accomplishments ==
- Pro Wrestling Illustrated
  - Ranked No. 76 of the top 100 female wrestlers in the PWI Female 100 in 2019
  - Ranked No. 9 of the top 150 female wrestlers in the PWI Women's 150 in 2021
  - Ranked No. 5 of the top 250 women's wrestlers in the PWI Women's 250 in 2023
- World Wonder Ring Stardom

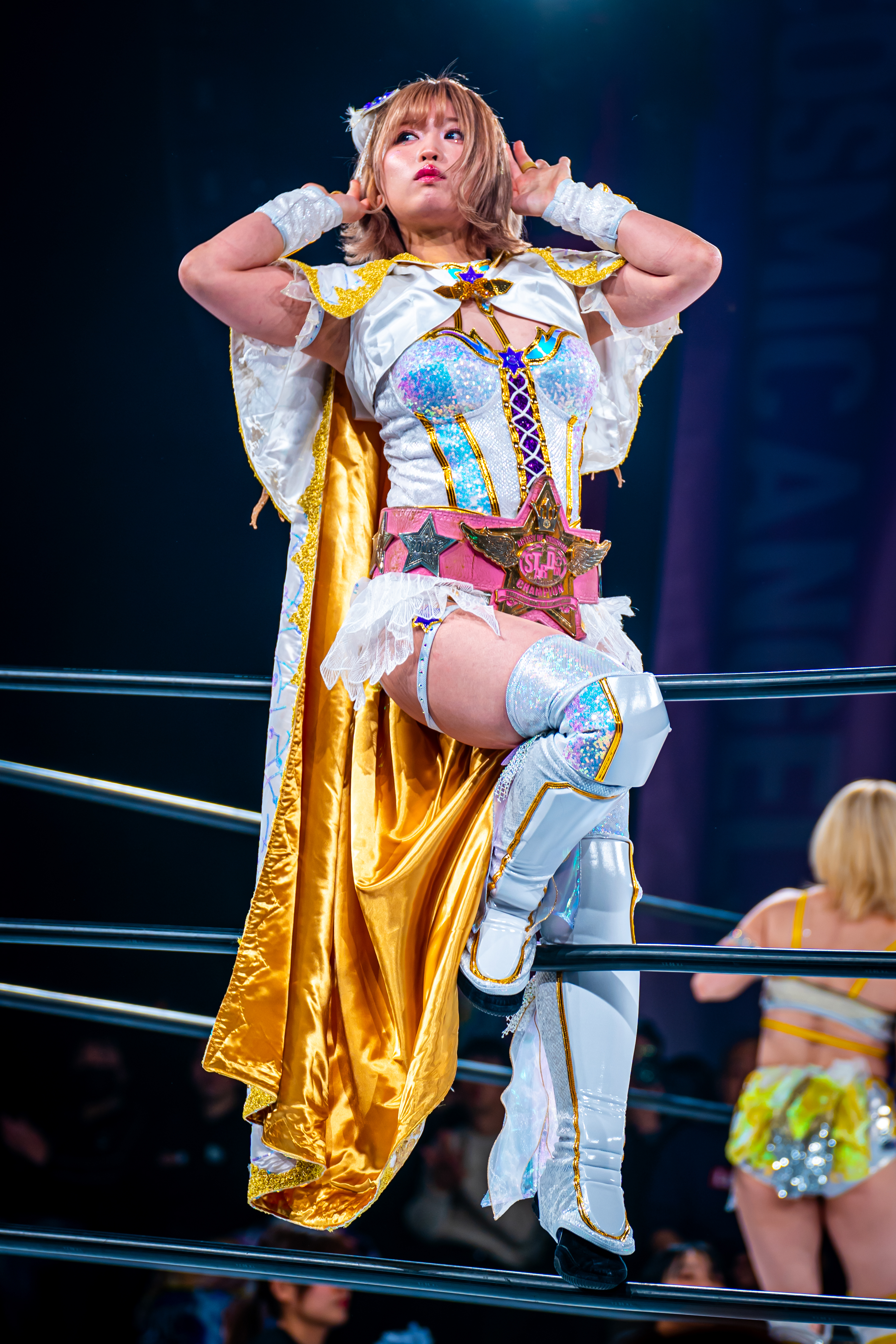
Nakano as Artist of Stardom Champion in 2025

  - Dream Come True Tournament Winner (2018)
  - Artist of Stardom Championship (4 times) – with Mayu Iwatani and Saki Kashima (2), Mina Shirakawa and Unagi Sayaka (1) and Natsupoi and Saori Anou (1)
  - Goddesses of Stardom Championship (1 time) – with Natsupoi
  - Wonder of Stardom Championship (2 times)
  - World of Stardom Championship (2 times)
  - Goddesses of Stardom Tag League (2019) – with Arisa Hoshiki
  - 5★Star GP Award (4 times)
    - 5★Star GP Fighting Spirit Award (2017)
    - 5★Star GP Finalist Award (2022)
    - 5★Star GP Outstanding Performance Award (2019)
    - 5★Star GP Red Stars Best Match Award (2020) vs. Giulia on September 13
  - Stardom Year-End Award (10 times)
    - Best Match Award (2019) vs. Arisa Hoshiki on June 16
    - Best Match Award (2021) vs. Giulia at All Star Dream Cinderella
    - Best Tag Team Award (2022) with Natsupoi
    - Fighting Spirit Award (2020)
    - Shining Award (2022)
    - MVP Award (2023)
    - Best Unit Award (2018) as a part of Stars, (2024) as part of Cosmic Angels
    - Special Merit Award (2025)
    - Best Match Award (2025) vs. Saya Kamitani at All Star Grand Queendom 2025
- Tokyo Sports
  - Women's Wrestling Grand Prize (2023)

== Luchas de Apuestas record ==
Winner (wager)	Loser (wager)	Location	Event	Date	Notes
Tam Nakano (Hair)	Giulia (Hair)	Tokyo, Japan	All Star Dream Cinderella	March 3, 2021	
Saya Kamitani (Contract)	Tam Nakano (Contract)	Tokyo, Japan	Stardom Nighter at Korakuen Hall	March 3, 2025	
Saya Kamitani (Career)	Tam Nakano (Career)	Yokohama, Japan	Stardom All Star Grand Queendom 2025	April 27, 2025	
