= Natsuko Tora =

Japanese professional wrestler (born 1991)

- Tora at a Stardom press conference in July 2017

Personal information
- Born: January 30, 1991 (age 35) Kawasaki, Kanagawa, Japan

Professional wrestling career
- Ring name(s): Natsuko Tora; Night Bear
- Billed height: 1.54 m (5 ft 1/2 in)
- Billed weight: 75 kg (165 lb)
- Billed from: Kawasaki, Kanagawa, Japan
- Trained by: World Wonder Ring Stardom
- Debut: October 30, 2016

Natsuko Tora (刀羅 ナツコ, Tōra Natsuko; born January 30, 1991) is a Japanese professional wrestler. She is signed to World Wonder Ring Stardom, where she is the leader of H.A.T.E

She is a former two-time Artist of Stardom Champion, two-time Goddesses of Stardom Champion, and a one-time World of Stardom Champion. Tora was the fourth and final leader of the Oedo Tai stable, disbanding it and creating it's spinoff version, the unit of H.A.T.E.

== Professional wrestling career ==
=== World Wonder Ring Stardom ===
==== J.A.N. (2016–2018) ====
On October 30, 2016, Tora made her professional wrestling debut where she teamed with Arisu Nanase as the two faced Azumi and Kaori Yoneyama in a losing effort. In 2017, Tora joined "Team Jungle", a group that involved the likes of Hiroyo Matsumoto, Jungle Kyona and Yoneyama. The group was later named "J.A.N.", an acronym for Jungle Assault Nation. On May 21, 2017, Tora received her first title match where she teamed with Kyona and Mayu Iwatani as they challenged Hiromi Mimura, Kairi Hojo and Konami for the Artist of Stardom Championship, but were unsuccessful.

On May 27, 2018, Tora, alongside Kyona and Yoneyama, defeated Oedo Tai (Hana Kimura, Hazuki and Kagetsu) to win the vacant Artist of Stardom Championship. The trio held the title until September 30, when they lost the title to Stars (Iwatani, Saki Kashima and Tam Nakano) during the afternoon show. On the evening show on the same day, Tora, alongside Kyona defeated Iwatani and Kashima to win the Goddesses of Stardom Championship. At Mask Fiesta 2018 on October 28, Tora, under the ring name Night Bear, teamed up with Bear Dog and Black Jungle Fairy in a loss to Dame de Panko, La Gatita and Mayuchica. Kyona and Tora held the Goddesses of Stardom Championship until November 23, when they lost the title to Queen's Quest (Momo Watanabe and Utami Hayashishita). On December 16, Tora challenged Watanabe for the Wonder of Stardom Championship during the main event on the sixth day of Goddesses of Stars show, but was unsuccessful.

==== Oedo Tai (2018–2024) ====
On April 14, 2019, during the second annual draft, Tora was drafted to Oedo Tai after Kyona lost a five-way match, causing J.A.N. to disbanded. With Tora arrival to Oedo Tai, Tora embraced her villainous side. Tora became the leader of Oedo Tai with the former leader Kagetsu retiring. On March 24, 2020, Tora competed in the annual Cinderella Tournament and succeeded to advance to the finals where she was defeated by Giulia. On November 14, Tora, alongside Bea Priestley and Kashima, defeated Donna Del Mondo (Giulia, Maika and Syuri) to win the Artist of Stardom Championship. On December 16, Tora, alongside Kashima and Priestley, lost the Artist of Stardom Championship to Cosmic Angels (Mina Shirakawa, Nakano and Unagi Sayaka).

On January 17, 2021, at Stardom 10th Anniversary Show, Tora challenged Giulia for the Wonder of Stardom Championship in a no disqualification match, but was unsuccessful. On July 7, Tora challenged Hayashishita for the World of Stardom Championship during the main event of Yokohama Dream Cinderella 2021 in Summer, however, the match was stopped by the referee after Tora suffered an injury, which was later confirmed to be a torn ACL.

==== H.A.T.E. (2024–present) ====
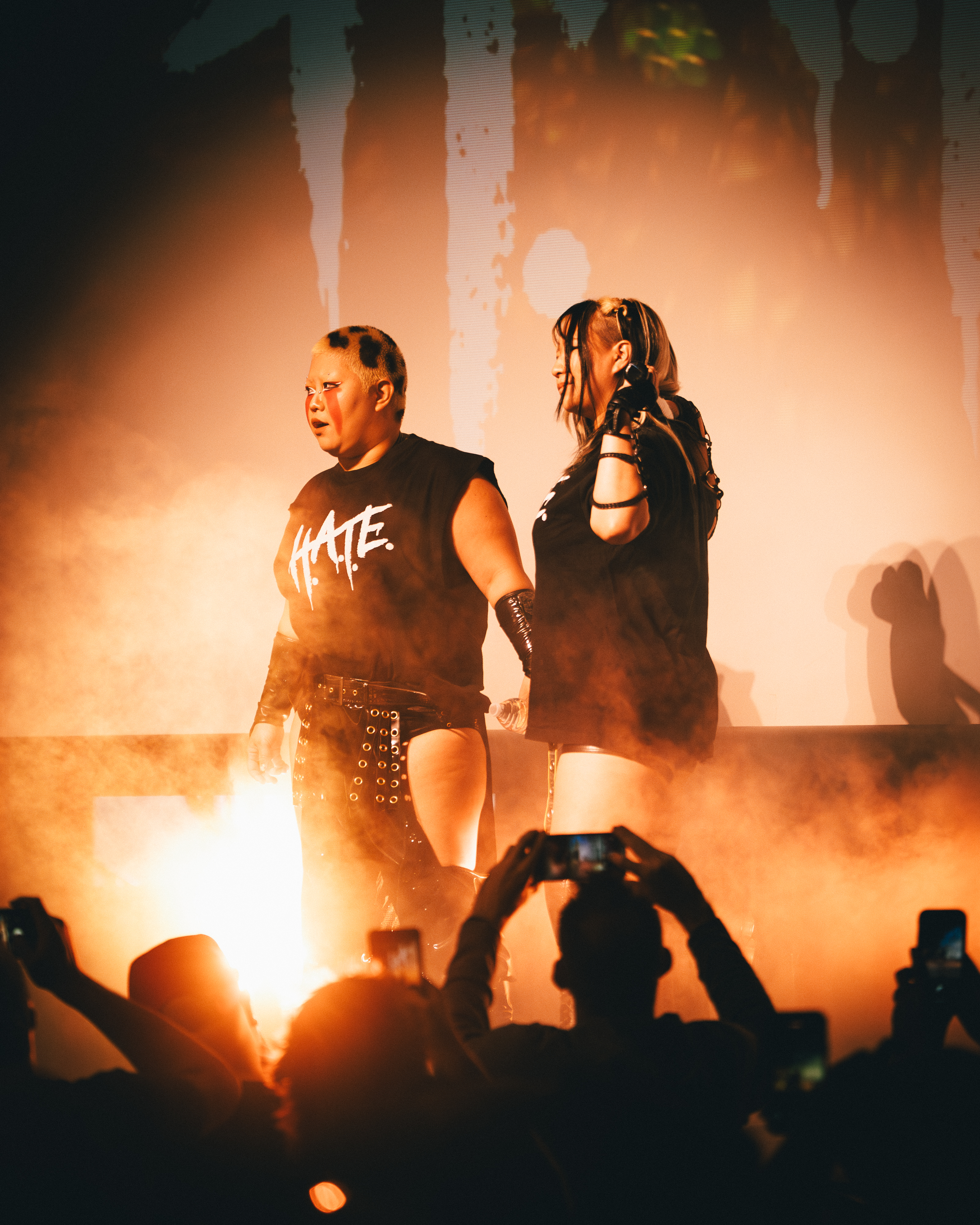
Tora (left) with Momo Watanabe as "XL" in April 2025.

On the second night of the Stardom Sapporo World Rendezvous on July 28, 2024, Tora announced the dissolution of Oedo Tai and the birth of the newly created unit of H.A.T.E. (which represented a spinoff of the latter unit) featuring herself, Saya Kamitani, Momo Watanabe, Thekla, Konami, Rina and Ruaka.

== Championships and accomplishments ==
- Pro Wrestling Illustrated
  - Ranked No. 43 of the top 250 female wrestlers in the PWI Women's 250 in 2024
- World Wonder Ring Stardom
  - World of Stardom Championship (1 time)
  - Artist of Stardom Championship (2 times) – with Bea Priestley and Saki Kashima (1), and Jungle Kyona and Kaori Yoneyama (1)
  - Goddesses of Stardom Championship (2 times) – with Jungle Kyona (1) and Ruaka (1)
  - Top Unit Trios Tournament (2021) – with Saki Kashima and Ruaka
  - 5★Star GP Award (2 time)
    - 5★Star GP Fighting Spirit Award (2023)
    - 5★Star GP Red Stars Best Match Award (2025) vs. Rina on August 2 in Red Stars B
  - Stardom Year-End Award (2 times)
    - Best Unit Award (2021) as part of Oedo Tai, shared with Momo Watanabe, Rina, Ruaka, Saki Kashima and Starlight Kid
    - Fighting Spirit Award (2018)
    - Best Tag Team Award (2025) – with Ruaka
    - Best Unit Award (2025) – as part of H.A.T.E.
