= The Swords of Essex =

Professional wrestling tag team

Swords of Essex

Tag team
- Former member(s): Will Ospreay; Paul Robinson; Scott Wainwright; Amazon
- Debut: May 12, 2013
- Years active: 2013–2019, 2023

The Swords of Essex was a British professional wrestling tag team consisting of Will Ospreay, Paul Robinson, Scott Wainwright and Amazon. The team has competed for various notable British promotions such as International Pro Wrestling: United Kingdom, PROGRESS Wrestling, and Revolution Pro Wrestling.

Robinson and Ospreay began teaming in 2013 for Future Pro Wrestling (FPW) and became a very successful tag team in the British wrestling circuit. A highly decorated tag team, Swords of Essex won numerous tag team championships including the British Tag Team Championship, the FPW Tag Team Championship, and PROGRESS Tag Team Championship once each. They broke up as a tag team in 2014 and began feuding with each other in PROGRESS before reuniting in late 2015. They were joined by Scott Wainwright in 2016, making it a trio. Together, the three held the British Triangle Championship once, while their combinations won tag team titles. Robinson and Wainwright would win the IPW:UK Tag Team Championship and the RCWA Tag Team Championship once each while Ospreay and Wainwright would win the WCPW Tag Team Championship once.

Wainwright left the group in 2017 due to injury, making Swords of Essex, a tag team again. The team disbanded in 2019 as Ospreay began wrestling full-time exclusively for New Japan Pro-Wrestling. Swords of Essex would then reunite in 2023.

== History ==
=== Original tag team ===
==== Future Pro Wrestling (2013–2015) ====
Paul Robinson and Will Ospreay teamed together for the first time for Future Pro Wrestling (FPW) at the promotion's Crowning Glory event on May 12, 2013, defeating Terry Striker and The Warden. Soon after, Swords of Essex participated in a tournament to determine the inaugural FPW Tag Team Championship. They defeated The Lords of the Ring (Jonathan Windsor and Master Joel) in the first round and Project Ego (Kris Travis and Martin Kirby) at SummerTime Brawl 3 in the semi-final round at Reloaded 3.0 to advance to the final to the tournament, a four-way elimination match at Crowning Glory on May 11, 2014. They defeated The Alpha Males (Charlie Garrett and Iestyn Rees), The Bhangra Knights (Darrell Allen and RJ Singh) and The London Riots (James Davis and Rob Lynch) in the tournament final to become the first-ever FPW Tag Team Champions.

The team successfully defended the titles against teams such as Terry Striker and The Warden at School's In 2, and The Addiction (Christopher Daniels and Frankie Kazarian) at Trick Or Treat 4, before participating in a three-way Best of Four Series against The Alpha Males and The London Riots for the titles. Swords of Essex lost the first two matches at Jingle Bell Brawl. At Reloaded IV - Back To The Futurezone, Robinson no-showed the third match of the series and Ospreay singlehandedly defended the titles against Alpha Males and London Riots in a three-way match, in which London Riots' IPW:UK Tag Team Championship and NGW Tag Team Championship were also on the line. London Riots won the match and the series.

==== Revolution Pro Wrestling (2013–2014) ====
Robinson and Ospreay used the name "Swords of Essex" for the first time at a Revolution Pro Wrestling event Road To Thunder on May 26, 2013, by defeating London Riots to become the #1 contenders for the British Tag Team Championship. Swords of Essex received their title shot at When Thunder Strikes, where they defeated Project Ego to win the British Tag Team Championship. Swords of Essex made their first successful title defense against Ligero and Mark Haskins via disqualification at Summer Sizzler. At Uprising, Swords of Essex teamed with Project Ego to defeat Ligero, Haskins and London Riots in an eight-man tag team match. This led to Swords of Essex defending the titles against London Riots in a match at Christmas Cracker, which Swords of Essex won to retain. At High Stakes on March 15, 2014, Swords of Essex lost the titles to The Inner City Machine Guns (Rich Swann and Ricochet). The following day, at Sittingbourne Spectacular, Swords of Essex wrestled their last match as a team in RPW, in which they defeated Jay Lethal and Sonjay Dutt.

==== PROGRESS Wrestling (2014–2015) ====
Swords of Essex teamed together for the first time in PROGRESS Wrestling at Chapter Eleven: To Fight War, You Must Become War on January 26, 2014, where they participated in a tournament to crown the inaugural PROGRESS Tag Team Champions, losing to FSU (Eddie Dennis and Mark Andrews) in the semi-final. At Chapter 13: Unbelievable Jeff, Swords of Essex participated in a four-way elimination match to determine the #1 contenders for the Tag Team Championship, against London Riots, Project Ego and Screw Indy Wrestling (Mark Haskins and Sha Samuels). Following the elimination of Project Ego and Screw Indy Wrestling, Robinson turned on Ospreay by walking off while Ospreay was about to tag him, resulting in London Riots beating Ospreay. After the match, the PROGRESS Champion Jimmy Havoc ordered London Riots to tie Ospreay with a chair and tried to stab him with a knife but PROGRESS wrestlers made the save and prevented Havoc from harming Ospreay. As a result, Robinson joined Havoc, Isaac Zercher, and London Riots in forming a faction called Regression and began feuding with Ospreay due to jealousy from his popularity with the audience.

Robinson and Ospreay feuded with each other as they competed in various tag team matches on opposing teams, until the two former partners had a grudge match against each other at Chapter 16: Very Very Very Breaky Breaky Breaky Bishi Bishiii, which Ospreay won. The rivalry escalated to a new level when Robinson defeated Regression leader Jimmy Havoc in a no disqualification match at Chapter 21: You Know We Don't Like To Use The Sit Down Gun to become the #1 contender for the PROGRESS Championship. Robinson received the PROGRESS Championship title shot against Ospreay at Chapter 22: Trust, Encouragement, Reward, Loyalty, Satisfaction, which Ospreay won to retain the title.

=== Expansion ===
==== International Pro Wrestling: United Kingdom (2014–2016) ====
Swords of Essex began teaming in International Pro Wrestling: United Kingdom at The Quarter Finals on May 17, 2014, in the midst of Robinson's IPW:UK World Championship reign. Swords of Essex won their first match in IPW:UK by defeating El Loco Gringo and Mexican Eagle. The two tag team partners would then begin feuding with each other. Robinson won the first encounter at A Taste of IPW:Germany. The following day, at Christmas Cracker, Robinson teamed with Brian Myers to defeat Ospreay and Tom Dawkins. Ospreay would avenge the losses by defeating Robinson in a No Holds Barred match on the first night of Weekend of Champions. Ospreay then ended the feud by defeating Robinson in a rematch on the second night.

At Supershow on November 8, 2015, Ospreay defeated Robinson and Tom Dawkins in a three-way match. After the match, Swords of Essex reunited as a team. They competed at Christmas Cracker on December 20, where they defeated Scott Star and Tom Dawkins. Shortly after, Scott Wainwright joined Swords of Essex as a third member of the group. His first match as a Swords of Essex member took place at Supershow 2 on March 28, 2016. At the event, Ospreay and Wainwright participated in a four-way match to determine the #1 contenders for the IPW:UK Tag Team Championship. The match was won by 2 Unlimited (Jay Sammon and Patrick Sammon). Later at the event, Ospreay lost a loser leaves town match to Tom Dawkins, forcing Ospreay to leave the promotion.

Following Ospreay's departure, Robinson continued to team with Wainwright as Swords of Essex in IPW:UK. At Biggest Show Ever, Swords of Essex defeated DND (Cieran Donnelly and Danny Duggan) to win the Tag Team Championship. They successfully defended the titles against DND in a rematch at Brawl at the Hall. During this time, Amazon joined Swords of Essex and Ospreay was reinstated into IPW:UK. At Supershow 5, Swords of Essex used the Freebird Rule as Ospreay and Amazon substituted for the injured Wainwright and an inactive Robinson and defended the Tag Team Championship against The London Riots and DND in a three-way match. As a result, Ospreay and Amazon were recognized as co-champions. London Riots won the match, ending Swords of Essex's title reign.

==== Reloaded Championship Wrestling Alliance (2015–2016) ====
After a year of feuding in PROGRESS Wrestling, Swords of Essex reunited in Reloaded Championship Wrestling Alliance (RCWA), as Ospreay and Robinson teamed with each other in an eight-person tag team match at Battle Lines on November 14, 2015. They were a part of Team Sanders (Chuck Cyrus and Priscilla) against Team Weston (Ash Draven, Joel Masters, Kip Sabian and Sean Wilson), in a match where if Team Sanders won, Lauren Sanders would get control of RCWA and if Team Weston won, Sam Weston would win control of the company. Robinson would begin a feud with The Reckoning (Ash Draven, Ryan Wilson, and Sean Wilson), which led Swords of Essex to challenge Draven and Sean to a match for the RCWA Tag Team Championship at Saturday Night on May 7, 2016. Swords of Essex failed to win the titles. At Live in Rainham, Swords of Essex defeated Sabian and Reckoning in a handicap match.

Swords of Essex, represented by Robinson and Scott Wainwright, would later defeat Reckoning to win the Tag Team Championship. They made a successful title defense against KOSS Industries (Kosta K and Malik) on December 10, before vacating the titles on May 13, 2017, due to Wainwright's injury.

==== WhatCulture Pro Wrestling (2016–2017) ====
Swords of Essex began teaming in WhatCulture Pro Wrestling on the November 19, 2016 episode of Loaded, where Robinson and Wainwright defeated Moustache Mountain (Trent Seven and Tyler Bate). The rivalry continued at Delete WCPW pay-per-view, where Swords of Essex and Bea Priestley defeated Moustache Mountain and Nixon Newell in a mixed tag team match. Swords of Essex continued their alliance with Priestley as they teamed with Bully Ray to take on Martin Kirby and Matt Hardy in a no disqualification handicap match on the December 17 episode of Loaded, which Kirby and Hardy won. However, at KirbyMania, Ray and Swords of Essex defeated Drew Galloway, Johnny Moss and Liam Slater. Swords of Essex continued their success by defeating Joe Hendry and Martin Kirby at Lights Out. On the January 16, 2017 episode of Loaded, Swords of Essex unsuccessfully challenged Johnny Moss and Liam Slater for the WCPW Tag Team Championship.

However, at the True Destiny, Ospreay substituted for Robinson and teamed with Wainwright to represent Swords of Essex as they defeated Slater and Moss, El Ligero and Gabriel Kidd, and Prospect (Alex Gracie and Lucas Archer) to win the Tag Team Championship. Swords of Essex made their first successful title defense against The South Coast Connection (Ashley Dunn and Kelly Sixx) at Chain Reaction. At Bulletproof: Championship Showdown, Swords of Essex retained the titles against Liam Slater and Matt Riddle, Prospect and The Young Bucks (Matt Jackson and Nick Jackson) in a four-way match. At Built To Destroy, Swords of Essex defeated Prospect to retain the titles in their third title defense. However, on the August 4 episode of Loaded, Swords of Essex lost the titles to War Machine (Hanson and Ray Rowe).

==== Return to PROGRESS Wrestling (2018–2019) ====
Wainwright's injury would lead to him leaving Swords of Essex, thus reducing it to the original tag team of Robinson and Ospreay. At the Chapter 82: Unboxing Live! 3 - A Dukla Prague Away Kit event on December 30, 2018, Swords of Essex reunited in PROGRESS as they defeated Aussie Open (Kyle Fletcher and Mark Davis) to win the PROGRESS Tag Team Championship. Swords of Essex successfully defended the titles against CCK (Chris Brookes and Kid Lykos) and Aussie Open, before losing the titles back to Aussie Open in a Tables, Ladders and Chairs match at Chapter 87: Breadknife. This was Ospreay's last match in PROGRESS for four years as he signed a full-time five-year deal with New Japan Pro-Wrestling after having wrestled for the company for three years. As a result, Swords of Essex disbanded as Robinson continued to wrestle in England.

=== Reunion (2023) ===
On May 7, 2023, PROGRESS Wrestling issued a statement in conjunction with TNT Extreme Wrestling on its website that Swords of Essex would reunite as a team after four years and compete for both promotions. This marked Ospreay's return to PROGRESS after four years and Robinson's return after three years. Ospreay was also announced as a participant in the 2023 Super Strong Style 16 tournament. Ospreay defeated Tate Mayfairs in the first round, before losing to Nathan Cruz by disqualification in the quarterfinals. On the third night of the event, Swords of Essex competed in their first match as a team in four years, in which they teamed with Callum Newman to defeat Newman's CPF teammates Danny Black, Joe Lando and Maverick Mayhew.

== Championships and accomplishments ==
- Future Pro Wrestling
  - FPW Tag Team Championship (1 time, inaugural) – Robinson and Ospreay
- International Pro Wrestling: United Kingdom
  - IPW:UK World Championship (1 time) – Robinson
  - IPW:UK Tag Team Championship (1 time) – Amazon, Robinson, Wainwright and Ospreay
- PROGRESS Wrestling
  - PROGRESS Tag Team Championship (1 time) – Robinson and Ospreay
- Reloaded Championship Wrestling Alliance
  - RCWA Tag Team Championship (1 time) – Robinson and Wainwright
- Revolution Pro Wrestling
  - British Tag Team Championship (1 time) – Robinson and Ospreay
- WhatCulture Pro Wrestling
  - WCPW Tag Team Championship (1 time) – Ospreay and Wainwright
- Other titles
  - British Triangle Championship (1 time) – Robinson, Ospreay and Wainwright
