= IPW:UK Tag Team Championship =

Professional wrestling tag team championship

Details
- Promotion: International Pro Wrestling: United Kingdom
- Date established: 17 July 2005
- Date retired: 24 September 2017

Other names
- IPW:UK Tag Team Championship (2005-2007, 2012-2017); IPW:UK British Tag Team Championship (2007-2012)
Statistics
- First champions: AK-47 (Ashe and Kris Linnell)
- Final champions: The Collevtive (Sammy Smooth & James Castle)
- Most reigns: The London Riots (James Davis and Rob Lynch) (3 times)
- Longest reign: The Leaders Of The New School (Marty Scurll and Zack Sabre Jr.) (630 days)
- Shortest reign: The London Riots (James Davis and Rob Lynch) (27 days)

The IPW:UK Tag Team Championship was a professional wrestling tag team championship created and promoted by the English professional wrestling promotion International Pro Wrestling: United Kingdom. The inaugural champions was AK-47 (Ashe and Kris Linell) and they won the titles on July 7, 2005.

The championship was originally established on 7 July 2005 as the IPW:UK Tag Team Championship. At Weekend of Champions Night 2, AK47 (Ashe and Kris Linnell) defeated the Chav Army (Battalion and Flaming Red) in the finals of a tournament to become the inaugural champions. On 4 May 2008 at IPW:UK Royale Rewards; the reigning IPW:UK Tag Team Champions The Kartel (Sha Samuels and Terry Frazier) defeated the reigning Real Quality Wrestling Tag Team Champions The Thrillers (Joel Redman and Mark Haskins) to unify both titles. The titles were renamed the IPW:UK British Tag Team Championships.

In August 2012, then IPW:UK booker Andy Quildan left the company thus Revolution Pro Wrestling (RPW or RevPro) was founded. At RevPro Summer Sizzler 2012, Project Ego (Kris Travis and Martin Kirby) cashed-in their Money in the Bank briefcase to become the IPW:UK British Tag Team Champions. After losing the titles on March 30, 2013; Project Ego continued to be recognized as the RPW British Tag Team Champions.

== Title history ==
Key
No.	Overall reign number
Reign	Reign number for the specific team—reign numbers for the individuals are in parentheses, if different
Days	Number of days held
+	Current reign is changing daily

No.	Champion	Championship change			Reign statistics		Notes	Ref.
No.	Champion	Date	Event	Location	Reign	Days	Notes	Ref.
1	AK-47 (Ashe and Kris Linnell)	17 July 2005	IPW:UK 2nd Anniversary Weekend: Night 2	Orpington, Greater London, England	1	216	Defeated the Chav Army (Battalion and Flaming Red) in the finals of tournament to become the inaugural champions.	
2	The Untouchables (Dave Moralez and Jack Storm)	18 February 2006	IPW:UK A Taste of IPW	Orpington, Greater London, England	1	218		
3	The Dragon Hearts (Dragon Phoenix and Spud)	24 September 2006	IPW:UK 2nd Anniversary Weekend: Night 2	Orpington, Greater London, England	1	77	This was a Tables, ladders, and chairs match.	
4	Swiss Money Holding (Ares, Claudio Castagnoli, and Marc Roudin)	10 December 2006	IPW:UK The Dome Show	Colchester, Essex, England	1	287	They defended the titles under the Freebird Rule though it was mostly Ares and Castagnoli.	
5	The Kartel (Sha Samuels and Terry Frazier)	23 September 2007	IPW:UK 3rd Anniversary Weekender: Night 2	Orpington, Greater London, England	1	371	On May 4, 2008 at Royale Rewards; the Kartel defeated reigning Real Quality Wrestling Tag Team Champions The Thrillers (Doug Basham, Joel Redman, Mark Haskins, and Ricky Hype) to unify both titles. The titles were renamed the IPW:UK British Tag Team Championships.	
6	The Thrillers (Doug Basham, Joel Redman, Mark Haskins, and Ricky Hype)	28 September 2008	IPW:UK Fourth Anniversary Tour: Wolves	Wolverhampton, West Midlands, England	1	217	They defended the titles under the Freebird Rule.	
7	The Leaders of the New School (Marty Scurll and Zack Sabre Jr.)	3 May 2009	The Sittingbourne Spectacular	Sittingbourne, Kent, England	1	495		
8	The All Stars (Mikey Whiplash and Robbie Dynamite)	10 September 2010	Dragon Gate: Yokosuka vs. SHINGO 2	Hoddesdon, Hertfordshire, England	1	86	This took place in a dark match.	
9	The Leaders of the New School (Marty Scurll and Zack Sabre Jr.)	5 December 2010	IPW:UK Brawl at the Hall 2010	Sittingbourne, Kent, England	2	630	Defeated ¡Peligro Abejas! (El Generico and Paul London) in the finals of a three-team round-robin tournament also involving The All Stars.	
10	Project Ego (Kris Travis and Martin Kirby)	26 August 2012	IPW:UK Summer Sizzler 2012	Sittingbourne, Kent, England	1	216	This was Project Ego's Money in the Bank cash-in match.	
11	The Wild Cats (Dark Panther and Lion Kid)	30 March 2013	IPW:UK Battle Royale 2013	Swanley, Kent, England	1	49	The Wild Cats cashed-in their 2012 Royale Reward. Project Ego continued to be recognized as the RPW British Tag Team Champions.	
12	The London Riots (James Davis and Rob Lynch)	18 May 2013	IPW:UK Royale Rewards 2013	Swanley, Kent, England	1	134		
13	The Bhangra Knights (Darrell Allen and RJ Singh)	29 September 2013	IPW:UK 9th Anniversary Show	Hoddesdon, Hertfordshire, England	1	112	This was a 30-minute Iron man match.	
14	The London Riots (James Davis and Rob Lynch)	19 January 2014	IPW:UK Zack vs. Hero	Tonbridge, Kent, England	2	539		
15	DND (Cieran Donnelly and Danny Duggan)	12 July 2015	IPW:UK Title Showdown	Tonbridge, Kent, England	1	406		
16	The Swords of Essex (Amazon, Paul Robinson, Scott Wainwright and Will Ospreay)	21 August 2016	IPW:UK Biggest Show Ever	Brixton, Greater London, England	1	119	Paul Robinson and Scott Wainwright won the titles but Will Ospreay and Amazon were retroactively recognized as champions under the freebird rule and occasionally defended the titles. Amazon was the first ever female wrestler to win the titles.	
17	The London Riots (James Davis and Rob Lynch)	18 December 2016	IPW:UK Supershow 5: Ospreay vs. Rhodes	Rochester, Kent, England	3	27	This was a three-way match which also included DND (Cieran Donnelly and Danny Duggan). Will Ospreay and Amazon defended the titles on the behalf of The Swords of Essex.	
18	DND (Cieran Donnelly and Danny Duggan)	14 January 2017	IPW:UK Tables, Ladders & Chairs Challenges	Selsdon, Greater London, England	2	246	This was a Tables, ladders, and chairs match.	
19	The Collective (James Castle, Lewis Howley and Sammy Smooth)	17 September 2017	IPW:UK SuperShow 11: Havoc vs. Noir	Rochester, Kent, England	1	182		
20	The Filthy Club (Jack Sexsmith and Robert Sharpe)	18 March 2018	IPW:UK Clapham Calling	Clapham, Greater London, England	1	136		
21	The Anti-Fun Police (Chief Deputy Dunne and Los Federales Santos Jr.)	1 August 2018	IPW:UK Live at Unit Nine: August 2018	Milton Keynes, Buckinghamshire, England	1	189		
22	Team Storm (Andreas Corr and Jonny Storm)	6 February 2019	IPW:UK International Pro Wrestling #4	Milton Keynes, Buckinghamshire, England	1	35	Aired on tape delay on March 1.	
23	Pretty Deadly (Lewis Howley and Sam Stoker)	13 March 2019	IPW:UK Pro Wrestling #8	Milton Keynes, Buckinghamshire, England	1 (2, 2)	77	Aired on tape delay on March 29. Stoker previously known as Sammy Smooth.	
24	The Anti-Fun Police (Chief Deputy Dunne and Los Federales Santos Jr.)	29 May 2019	IPW:UK LAX-Treme Measures 2019	Canterbury, Kent, England	2	548	This was a three-way Tables match also including Latin American Xchange (Ortiz and Santana).	
—	Deactivated	27 November 2020	—	—	—	—	The title was declared vacant and retired on 17 November 2020.	

== Combined reigns ==
=== By team ===
Rank	Champion	No. of reigns	Combined days
1	The Leaders of the New School (Marty Scurll and Zack Sabre Jr.)	2	1,125
2	The Anti-Fun Police (Chief Deputy Dunne and Los Federales Santos Jr.)	2	727
3	The London Riots (James Davis and Rob Lynch)	3	700
4	DND (Cieran Donnelly and Danny Duggan)	2	652
5	The Kartel (Sha Samuels and Terry Frazier)	1	371
6	Swiss Money Holding (Ares, Claudio Castagnoli, and Marc Roudin)	1	287
7	The Untouchables (Dave Moralez and Jack Storm)	1	218
8	The Thrillers (Doug Basham, Joel Redman, Mark Haskins, and Ricky Hype)	1	217
9	AK-47 (Ashe and Kris Linnell)	1	216
9	Project Ego (Kris Travis and Martin Kirby)	1	216
11	The Collective (James Castle, Lewis Howley and Sammy Smooth)	1	182
12	The Filthy Club (Jack Sexsmith and Robert Sharpe)	1	136
13	The Swords of Essex (Amazon, Paul Robinson, Scott Wainwright and Will Ospreay)	1	119
14	The Bhangra Knights (Darrell Allen and RJ Singh)	1	112
15	The All Stars (Mikey Whiplash and Robbie Dynamite)	1	86
16	Pretty Deadly (Lewis Howley and Sam Stoker)	1	77
16	The Dragon Hearts (Dragon Phoenix and Spud)	1	77
18	The Wild Cats (Dark Panther and Lion Kid)	1	49
19	Team Storm (Andreas Corr and Jonny Storm)	1	35

=== By wrestler ===
Rank	Wrestler	No. of reigns	Combined days
1	Marty Scurll	2	1,125
1	Zack Sabre Jr.	2	1,125
3	Chief Deputy Dunne	2	727
3	Los Federales Santos Jr.	2	727
5	James Davis	3	700
5	Rob Lynch	3	700
7	Cieran Donnelly	2	652
7	Danny Duggan	2	652
9	Sha Samuels	1	371
9	Terry Frazier	1	371
11	Ares	1	287
11	Claudio Castagnoli	1	287
11	Marc Roudin	1	287
14	Lewis Howley	2	259
14	Sammy Smooth/Sam Stoker	2	259
16	Dave Moralez	1	218
16	Jack Storm	1	218
18	Doug Basham	1	217
18	Joel Redman	1	217
18	Mark Haskins	1	217
18	Ricky Hype	1	217
22	Ashe	1	216
22	Kris Linnell	1	216
22	Kris Travis	1	216
22	Martin Kirby	1	216
26	James Castle	1	182
27	Jack Sexsmith	1	136
27	Robert Sharpe	1	136
29	Amazon	1	119
29	Paul Robinson	1	119
29	Scott Wainwright	1	119
29	Will Ospreay	1	119
33	Darrell Allen	1	112
33	RJ Singh	1	112
35	Mikey Whiplash	1	86
35	Robbie Dynamite	1	86
37	Dragon Phoenix	1	77
37	Spud	1	77
39	Dark Panther	1	49
39	Lion Kid	1	49
41	Andreas Corr	1	35
41	Jonny Storm	1	35

== See also ==
- IPW:UK World Championship
- IPW:UK Women's Championship
- IPW:UK Junior Heavyweight Championship
