= Swiss Money Holding =

Professional wrestling tag team

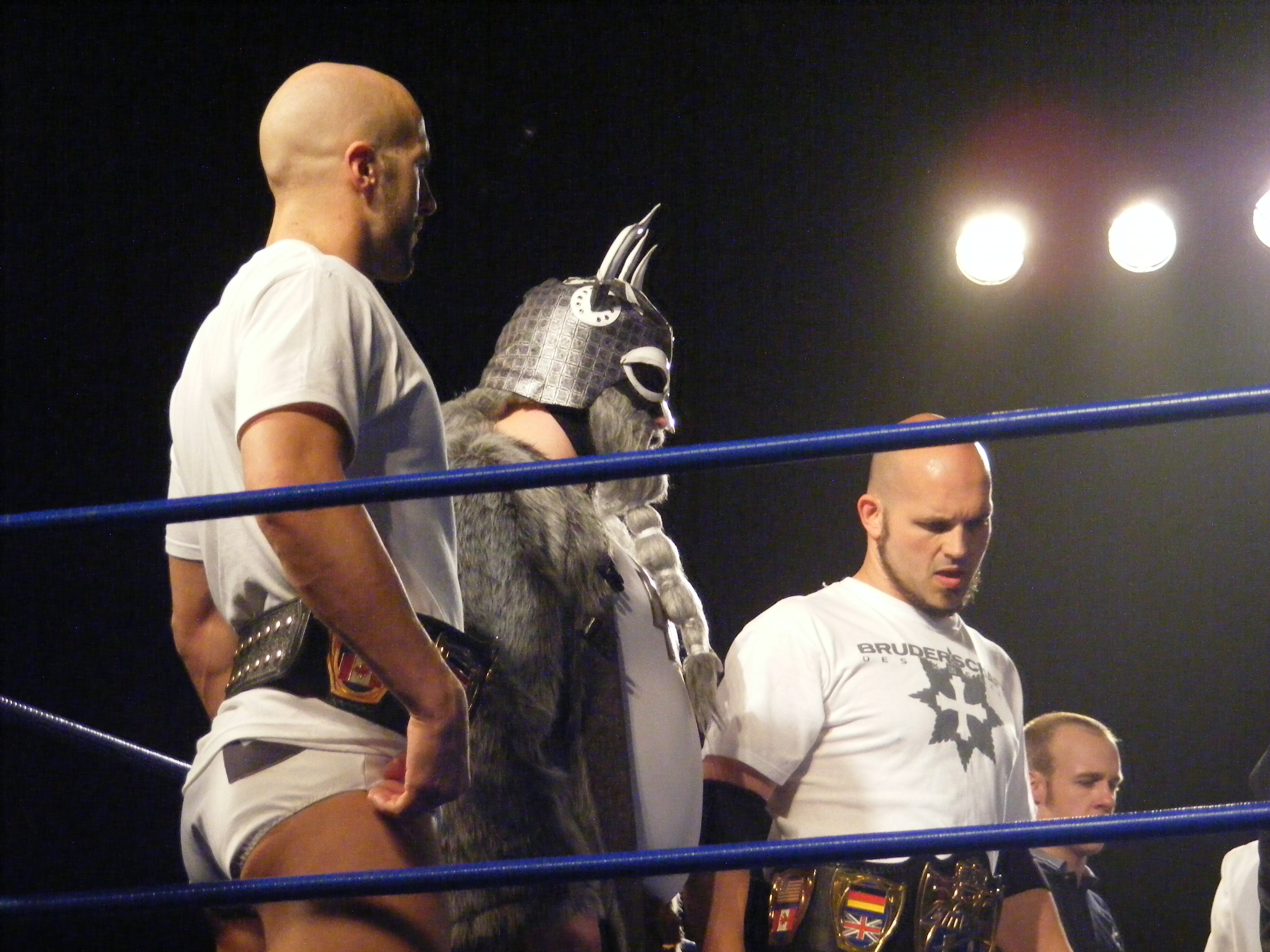
- Ares (right) and Castagnoli (left) as the Chikara Campeones de Parejas, with Tursas (center) at the 2010 King of Trios

Tag team
- Members: Ares; Double C Marc Roudin
- Name(s): Swiss Money Holding $wiss Money Holding; Swi$$ Money Holding
- Billed heights: Ares: 6 ft 0 in (1.83 m); Double C: 6 ft 5 in (1.96 m); Roudin: 5 ft 7 in (1.70 m)
- Combined billed weight: 457 lb (207 kg) (Ares and Double C)
- Billed from: Zurich, Switzerland; United Bank of Switzerland
- Former member: Don Heavy
- Debut: 2001
- Disbanded: September 2011

The Swiss Money Holding was a professional wrestling tag team originally composed of Ares and Claudio Castagnoli, and later joined by Marc Roudin in late 2004. Their in-ring personas parodied Swiss bankers from the United Bank of Switzerland. The team first worked for Westside Xtreme Wrestling in Essen, Germany, for much of their early career and later competed in promotions throughout the continent. Within a few years, $MH were considered one of the top tag teams in Europe having won titles in Germany, the United Kingdom and Switzerland.

They are regarded as one of the most dominant tag teams in the history of International Pro Wrestling: United Kingdom having held the promotion's tag team titles for a record 12 months, and have been acknowledged by Britain's UK Pitbulls and visiting American wrestlers such as Chris Hero and Colt Cabana.

At the invitation of Hero, Ares and Castagnoli eventually traveled to the United States where they wrestled in several major independent promotions, most notably, IWA Mid-South and Chikara. After their return to Europe in 2004, Castagnoli went back to the US wrestle full-time for Chikara while Ares remained to Europe to carry on with Marc Roudin. Though Castagnoli would continue to team with Ares from time to time, they would not reunite until Ares' surprise appearance at Chikara's “Three-Fisted Tales” show in 2009. Becoming part of the BDK, they would go on to win the 2010 King of Trios with Tursas.

== Career ==
=== Westside Xtreme wrestling (2001–2003) ===
Swiss Money Holding was formed in 2001 when wXw promoter Hate and wrestler SigMasta Rappo, their trainer, decided to pair the two Swiss wrestlers as a tag team. Their first match together was against Euro Threat (HATE and SigMasta Rappo) at the "Taste It Twice" supercard on May 13, 2001. Both had only very recently joined the German promotion, however their similar personalities and ring style proved immediately popular with fans. Wrestling as "heels", their in-ring personae were parodies of Swiss bankers.

From 2001 to 2003, Don Heavy, a trainee of Ares' and Castagnoli's, would also occasionally team with the duo as the third member of the team. The team would eventually win the wXw Tag Team Championship a record 3-times by the end of 2002, and Castagnoli won the wXw Heavyweight title from Jimmy Jacobs at the end of 2003. That same year, they also won a "tag team turmoil match" against Fighting Spirit, Louis Van Eden and Luchadore Sitoci, Z Shooting Star Sick and Steve Douglas, Darksoul and Alex Pain and Murat Bosporus and Thomas Blase to become the first tag team champions for German Stampede Wrestling.

They soon began wrestling in other German promotions, such as Athletik Club Wrestling, European Wrestling Fighters, and the New Alliance of Wrestling Athletes, as well as outside the country. Among these were Austria's Riotgas Wrestling Alliance and Wrestling Warriors Austria, and Freestyle Championship Wrestling in the Netherlands. Ares and Castagnoli faced each other in singles matches during this time and, on April 18, 2003, they participated in a 4 Way Dance against American wrestlers Chris Hero and Mike Quackenbush at the 2-day wXw supercard "Gott Eggs?". They also faced Hero and Quackenbush in a tag team match, and Hero in singles matches throughout the year.

=== Touring the United States (2003) ===
Hero was so impressed by their performance, he invited them to perform in the United States. They soon embarked on a summer tour of the US competing in a number of independent promotions on the East Coast and Midwestern United States. On July 4, 2003, Ares and Castagnoli made their first US appearance for IWA Mid South defeating Chris Hero and Mark Wolf at the "We Are Family" supercard in Clarksville, Indiana. The following night in Allentown, Pennsylvania, Swiss Money Holding made their Chikara debuts at the 2003 Tag World Grand Prix. They defeated Senior Assault Team (Melvin Snodgrass and Lester Crabtree) in the first round but were eliminated after drawing with the SuperFriends (Chris Hero and Mike Quackenbush).

Following a second appearance at the IWA Arena, Ares and Castagnoli took part in a third supercard, "X-treme Combat III", held by Xtreme Intense Championship Wrestling in Warren, Michigan, on July 13, 2003. They wrestled in the main event, a 3 Way Dance, against Jaimy CoxXx and Alex Shelley and XICW Tag Team Champions Gavin Starr and Jimmy Jacobs.

=== Introduction of Marc Roudin (2003–2009) ===
After their return to Europe, Castagnoli wanted to return to the United States so he could wrestle full-time for Chikara. As a result, Marc Roudin was brought in to replace him. Castagnoli would return to team with Ares on occasion, and while the trio were billed as a 3-man team, all three members were rarely seen together. Castagnoli's growing involvement with Chikara, and later Ring of Honor, saw Roudin making up the bulk of appearances with Ares for the next few years.

In early 2004, Swiss Money Holding began wrestling in France for Force Francophone de Catch and the International Catch Wrestling Alliance. On June 19, Castagnoli regained the wXw Heavyweight Championship from Ian Rotten in Wein, Austria. A month later, Castagnoli participated in the 2004 Ted Petty Invitational for IWA Mid-South while Ares faced Colt Cabana in his Germany debut. Ares would also win the wXw Heavyweight title the following year and, together with Roudin, also regained the GSW Tag Team Championship from Eric Schwarz and Michael Kovac on April 9, 2005.

On September 23, 2005, Swiss Money Holding was scheduled to appear for Italian Championship Wrestling's "Pandemonium IV" in Sondrio, Italy to face its tag team champions the Party Boyz (Ace and Andres Diamond). When Ares showed up without a partner, there was some confusion as to which team member would be joining him. While conducting an in-ring interview with the Party Boyz, General Manager Amarillo attacked both men revealing himself to be Ares' secret partner. In their title match later that night, Amarillo was pinned by Andres Diamond.

On December 10, 2006, Ares and Castagnoli made their debut in International Pro Wrestling: United Kingdom where they unexpectedly defeated IPW: UK Tag Team Champions Dragon Phoenix and Bubblegum, the latter substituting for injured co-champion Spud, in Colchester, England. Taking the titles back to Germany, Swiss Money Holding legitimized their claim on the belts by beating former champions The Dragon Hearts (Phoenix & Spud) in a rematch at the Orpington Halls upon their return to IPW: UK. Ares and Marc Roudin successfully defended the titles in Orpington against Team NOAH (Doug Williams and Go Shiozaki) on April 22, and The Dragon Hearts at the "A Taste Of IPW" show a week later. Ares and Castagnoli also entered the 2007 King Of Europe Cup with Trent Acid at the Olympia in Liverpool but were eliminated by the team of Atsushi Aoki, El Generico and Martin Stone.

In the first half of 2007, Ares and Roudin won both the ROE Switzerland and Fighting Spirit Federation tag team titles. Over the summer, they then feuded with The Kartel (Sha Samuels and Terry Frazier) and eventually lost the IPW: UK titles to them in August.

Ares also made a US appearance on November 7, teaming with Allison Danger in a mixed tag team match against Mr. Wrestling 3 and Shark Girl at the Carolina Wrestling Association's "All Or Nothing II" in York, South Carolina. Becky Bayless was the special guest referee. A month later, Swiss Money Holdind defeated SigMasta Rappo and British Stallion at "Winter Heat" for Swiss Championship Wrestling on December 15, 2007.

On January 19, 2008, Ares and Castagnoli faced fellow stablemate Marc Roudin and Chris Hero for the wXw Tag Team titles. Roudin and Hero had won them from AbLas (Absolute Andy and Steve Douglas) in Oberhausen, Germany, the previous November. At "IPW: UK vs. The World", Swiss Money Holding once more attempted to win back the IPW: UK titles from The Kartel at Broxbourne Civic Hall on March 15 but failed to defeat them. This was their last appearance in the promotion.

At the end of the year, Castagnoli and Roudin entered the 2008 Tag World Grand Prix in Oberhausen, Germany, on November 4, 2008. They were eliminated in the first round by The UnStable (Vin Gerard and STIGMA) when Gerard pinned Roudin.

By early 2009, Ares was also wrestling in the United States full-time following his marriage to Allison Danger. On January 29, he and Castagnoli took on the Carolina Wrestling Federation's Team Maction ("Krazy K" Kirby Mack and T.J. Mack) at the Carolina Sports Arena in Burlington, North Carolina. Kirby Mack sprained his right elbow during this match.

=== Reunion in Chikara (2009–2011) ===
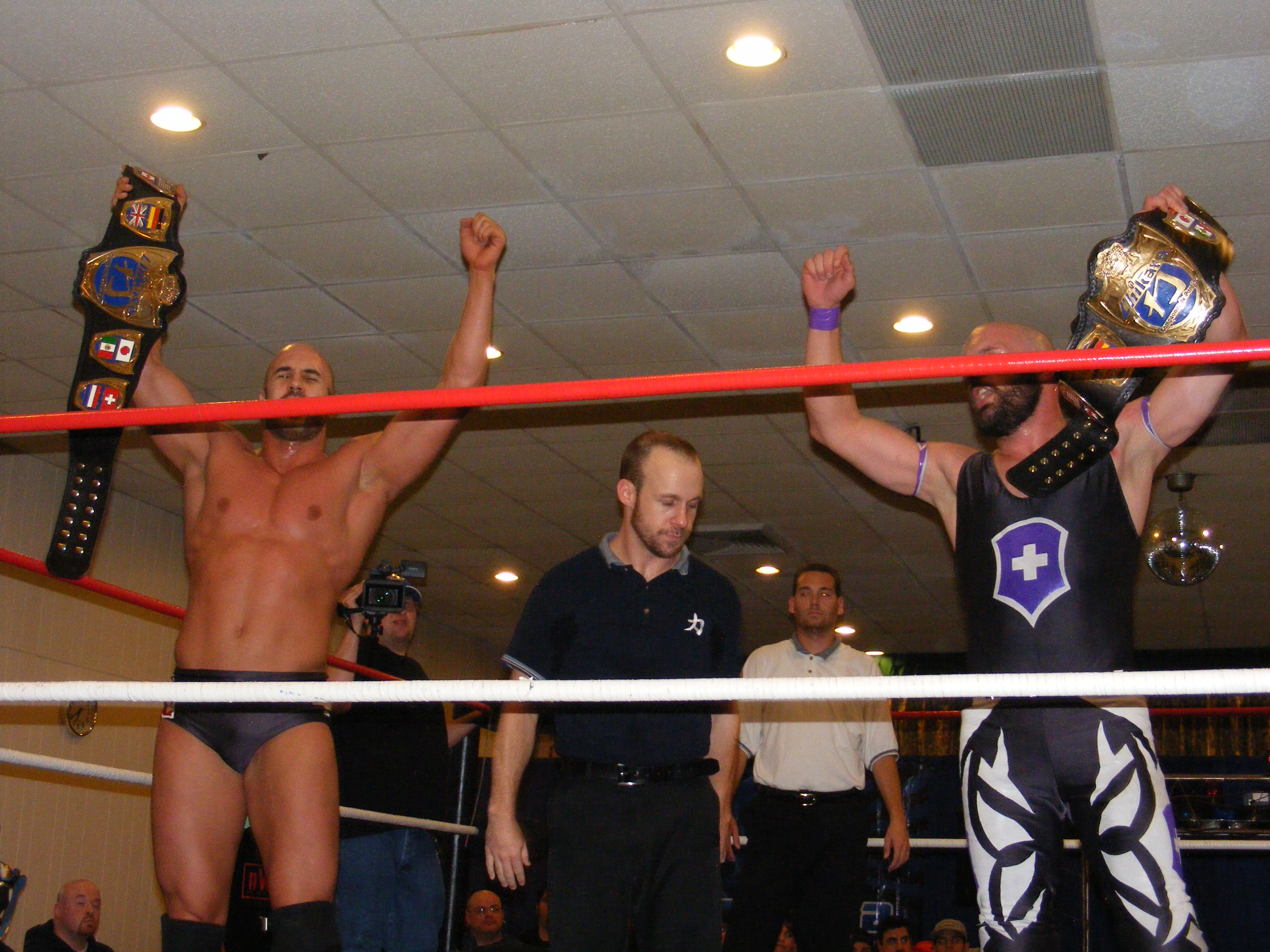
Ares and Claudio Castagnoli as the Chikara Campeones de Parejas in October 2010

After six years, the official SMH reunion between Ares and Castagnoli took place at the end of Chikara's “Three-Fisted Tales” show in Philadelphia, Pennsylvania, on November 22, 2009. When Ares revealed himself as the masked man who had been stalking UltraMantis Black, Castagnoli turned heel and attacked ally Mike Quackenbush. After beating the entire face roster Castagnoli aligned himself with Ares, Tursas, Pinkie Sanchez, Tim Donst, Sara Del Rey and Daizee Haze to form the Bruderschaft des Kreuzes.

After picking up the three points required to challenge for the Campeonatos de Parejas in just one weekend, Castagnoli and Ares defeated The Colony (Fire Ant and Soldier Ant) on March 20, 2010, to win the titles, making Castagnoli the first two-time Campeon de Parejas in Chikara history. In April Castagnoli, Ares and Tursas defeated the teams of The Osirian Portal (Amasis and Ophidian) and Sara Del Rey, Team Perros del Mal (El Alebrije, Cuije and El Orientál), Team Big Japan Wrestling (Daisuke Sekimoto, Kankuro Hoshino and Yuji Okabayashi) and The Colony (Fire Ant, Soldier Ant and Green Ant) over a three-day tournament to win the 2010 King of Trios. The team was broken up again in September 2011, when Castagnoli signed with WWE.

== Championships and accomplishments ==
- Chikara
  - Chikara Campeonatos de Parejas (1 times) – Ares and Castagnoli
  - King of Trios (2010) – Ares, Castagnoli and Tursas
- German Stampede Wrestling
  - GSW World Heavyweight Championship - Ares
  - GSW Tag Team Championship (2 times) – Ares, Castagnoli, Heavy and Roudin (1), Ares and Roudin (1)
- International Pro Wrestling: United Kingdom
  - IPW:UK Tag Team Championship (1 time) – Ares, Castagnoli and Roudin
- Pro Wrestling Illustrated
  - PWI ranked Ares # 122 of the 500 best singles wrestlers of the PWI 500 in 2007
  - PWI ranked Claudio Castagnoli # 67 of the 500 best singles wrestlers of the PWI 500 in 2007
- Revolution Pro Wrestling
  - Undisputed British Tag Team Championship (1 time)
- Swiss Wrestling Federation
  - SWF Heavyweight Championship (1 time) - Ares
  - SWF Powerhouse Championship (3 times) - Castagnoli (2) and Heavy (1)
  - SWF Light Heavyweight Champion (1 time) - Roudin
  - SWF Tag Team Championship (1 time) – Ares and Castagnoli
- Westside Xtreme Wrestling
  - wXw World Heavyweight Championship (4 times) – Ares (2) and Castagnoli (2)
  - wXw Tag Team Championship (3 times) – Ares and Castagnoli
