= James Castle (wrestler) =

English professional wrestler (1988–2024)

Personal information
- Born: 11 July 1988 London, England
- Died: 15 June 2024 (aged 35) England
- Cause of death: Acute myeloid leukemia

Professional wrestling career
- Ring name: James Castle
- Trained by: Andrew Simmons
- Debut: 2013
- Retired: 2020

Jamie Stacey (11 July 1988 – 15 June 2024), better known by the ring name James Castle, was an English professional wrestler. He primarily performed in the United Kingdom, most notably International Pro Wrestling: United Kingdom (IPW:UK) and Revolution Pro Wrestling (RevPro). He also wrestled for the National Wrestling Alliance (NWA).

== Professional wrestling career ==
Castle made his in-ring debut in RevPro in 2013. He was part of the stable The Revolutionists. On 14 June 2015, alongside Sha Samuels, he won the British Tag Team Championship. They held the titles until 12 June 2016, at Angle vs. Sabre Jr., Castle and Samuels teamed together until 5 March 2017, at Live at the Cockpit 14, when they lost to Moustache Mountain, after which Castle turned on Samuels, ending their partnership.

During his time in International Pro Wrestling: United Kingdom affiliation, Castle captured the IPW:UK Tag Team Championship one time as a freebird trio with Pretty Deadly, known as The Collective.

== Personal life and death ==
Castle was married to fellow wrestler Zoe Lucas. He was forced to retire from in-ring competition after he was diagnosed with acute myeloid leukemia after 2019. By January 2024, Castle's diagnosis became terminal and he died five months later on 15 June 2024, at the age of 35.

== Championships and accomplishments ==
- International Pro Wrestling: United Kingdom
  - IPW:UK Tag Team Championship (1 time) – with Lewis Howley and Sam Stoker
- Maximum Aggression Wrestling
  - MAW Absolute Championship (1 time)
- Revolution Pro Wrestling
  - RPW Undisputed British Tag Team Championship (1 time) – with Sha Samuels
- The Wrestling League
  - WL Heavyweight Championship (3 times)

== See also ==
- List of premature professional wrestling deaths
