= Simon Rigby =

English businessman

- Born: December 1961
- Died: 26 August 2020 (aged 58)
- Occupation: Businessman

William Simon Rigby (December 1961 – 26 August 2020) was an English businessman. At the time of his death he was an active member of over 70 companies.

== Early life and career ==
Rigby was born in 1961. The son of a farmer and one of six siblings, he grew up in Warton, Lancashire.

He graduated from the University of Hull with a degree in economics and began his career on the eastern side of the Pennines, working for Yorkshire Electricity. He bought out the company and formed Spice PLC.

As chief executive officer of Spice, which began with twelve employees, he oversaw the company's record turnover of £400 million with a staff of 4,500. Cinven purchased Spice in 2010 for £450 million.

In 2014, he purchased Preston Guild Hall from Preston City Council for £1. It was returned to the council in 2019 after alleged significant lease agreement breaches.

He saved Lancashire ice-cream purveyors Bonds of Elswick from liquidation in December 2017. The same year, he was named Lancastrian of the Year at the Biba Awards.

Rigby established The Rigby Organisation, which is headquartered at Whitehills Business Park in Blackpool.

== Personal life ==
Rigby was awarded an MBE in 2017, for services to business in the North West.

He was married to Linda, with whom he had two children.

== Death ==
Rigby died in 2020, aged 58.
