= BPI =

BPI may refer to:

== Banks ==
- Banca Popolare Italiana, an Italian bank merged into Banco Popolare
- Banco Português de Investimento, a Portuguese bank
- Bank of the Philippine Islands, the oldest bank in the Philippines and Southeast Asia
- Bpifrance, a French bank

== Business ==
- Beef Products, manufacturer of lean finely textured beef, or LFTB.
- British Phonographic Industry, a record industry trade association
- British Power International, a UK-based power sector consultancy
- Bundesverband der Pharmazeutischen Industrie, the German trade group for the pharmaceutical industry
- Burma Pharmaceutical Industry, a pharmaceutical brand name in Myanmar

== Health and medicine ==
- Bipolar I disorder
- Brachial plexus injury, an injury to the nerves that conduct signals from the spinal cord to the shoulder, arm and hand

== Measurements ==
- Base peak intensity, a type of mass chromatogram
- Bits-per-inch or bytes-per-inch, used to specify the data density of magnetic tape
- Bomb Power Indicator, used by the Royal Observer Corps during the Cold War to detect nuclear explosions
- Brief Pain Inventory, used to measure the change in pain intensity after treatment, for example, with anti-cancer drugs

== Science and technology ==
- Bactericidal permeability-increasing protein, an endogenous antibiotic protein that is part of the innate immune system encoded by the gene BPI
- Baseline Privacy Interface, a MAC layer security service
- Boolean prime ideal theorem, a mathematical theorem
- Branch on Program Interrupt, a simulated IBM S/360 and S/370 instruction under the Michigan Terminal System

== Other uses ==
- Baltimore Polytechnic Institute, a public high school in Maryland, United States
- Bard Prison Initiative, an inmate college degree program offered by Bard College, New York State
- Bibliothèque publique d'information, a large public library in the Centre Pompidou in Paris, France
- Bureau of Plant Industry (Philippines), a Philippines government agency
- Business process interoperability, a state that exists when a business process can meet a specific objective automatically utilizing essential human labor only
