= World of Sport Wrestling =

British professional wrestling television series and promotion

- Genre: Sports entertainment Professional wrestling
- Developed by: ITV
- Directed by: Simon Staffurth
- Starring: WOS Wrestling roster
- Narrated by: Alex Shane; SoCal Val
- Theme music composer: Paul Farrer
- Opening theme: "ITV World of Sport Wrestling 2018 - Main Theme"
- Composer: Paul Farrer
- Country of origin: United Kingdom
- Original language: English
- No. of seasons: 1

Production
- Executive producers: Simon Marsh; Tom McClennan
- Production locations: Dock10 studios (2016); Epic Studios (2018)
- Editors: Nikki Chang; Matthew East-Jones; Phillip Lindsey-Cooke
- Camera setup: Multicamera setup
- Running time: 60 minutes
- Production companies: ITV; Top Rope Sports

Original release
- Network: ITV
- Release: 31 December 2016 – November 29, 2018

WOS Wrestling (originally an acronym for World of Sport Wrestling) is a British professional wrestling television series and promotion. It was marketed as a relaunch of the wrestling segment from the ITV sports programme World of Sport, which ran from 1965 to 1985.

WOS Wrestling debuted on 31 December 2016 with a two-hour special on ITV. This was followed by a ten-episode series in 2018, and a six-date live tour between January and February 2019. The promotion went on a five-year hiatus before announcing its return on 28 June 2024, with a TV taping to take place later that year on 14 September.

== History ==
=== Background ===
ITV transmitted professional wrestling for over 33 years from November 1955 to December 1988. The bulk of this was screened on Saturday afternoons or lunchtimes (although other slots including midweek late evenings, midweek lunchtimes and bank holiday Monday afternoons were also used). Throughout World of Sport's lifetime, the Saturday afternoon coverage was generally incorporated into the package show as a slot. Joint Promotions held exclusive rights to ITV television coverage until the end of 1986, when they rotated with tapings of All Star Wrestling and occasional WWF special editions.

The distinct British wrestling style of Admiral-Lord Mountevans rules has persisted in the United Kingdom to the present day. Since the early 1990s, an additional strand of wrestling promotions has emerged that were producing more American-styled shows. The two genres have become known commonly as "Old School" and "New School", respectively, after the names used in an invasion angle run by the FWA promotion around 2001. Over the years, numerous attempts were made to relaunch professional wrestling on British television, with various promotions covered on a single local ITV franchise or satellite/digital channels; often touted as the "revival" of British Wrestling. ITV screened World Championship Wrestling (WCW) programming in the early hours and from 1992 to 1995 in their old Saturday afternoon slot, but no homegrown promotion ever received regular syndicated coverage.

In the 21st century, vintage ITV coverage was repeated as World of Sport on digital channels such as The Wrestling Channel and Men and Movies, resulting in the name "World of Sport" becoming a frequent retronym for the traditional, old-school style of British wrestling.

=== Development and relaunch ===
A pilot for a television series called World of Sport Wrestling was filmed at the Fairfield Halls, Croydon in November 2013. Branding itself as a direct revival of World of Sport on its old slot, WOS Wrestling was hosted by veteran ring announcer Lee Bamber. After it was rejected by ITV, the pilot was eventually uploaded to YouTube on 12 June 2015 by creator John Chapman. It would later be reuploaded in 2023.

On 19 October 2016, ITV commissioned a two-hour, one-off, World of Sport Wrestling special. The show would featured independent wrestlers such as Grado and Sha Samuels, and commentary from former WWE announcer Jim Ross.

The special was taped on 1 November 2016 from dock10 studios in Greater Manchester., and would premiere on 31 December 2016. The main storyline running through the show focused on Grado's quest to become WOS champion. He would lose to Dave Mastiff in a match to become inaugural champion before eventually winning the belt in a rematch at the end of the broadcast.

On 23 March 2017, ITV announced that they had commissioned a ten-episode series of WOS Wrestling in partnership with Total Nonstop Action (TNA) Wrestling (then known as Impact Wrestling). Then-Impact CCO Jeff Jarrett would serve as an executive producer, along with Tom McLennan and Simon Marsh. A TV taping was scheduled to take place at Preston Guild Hall on 25 and 26 May. On 28 April, Pro Wrestling Insider reported that the WOS tapings had been postponed.

=== 2018 Series and live tour ===
In April 2018, ITV announced the return of WOS Wrestling as a ten-part series. The series was taped at Epic Studios in Norwich, on May 10, 11, and 12.

WOS's first series was broadcast from July 28 until September 29, and was hosted by Alex Shane and SoCal Val. Its main storyline focused on the championship reign of Rampage, and his pursuit by challenger Justin Sysum. Sysum competed in Rampage's Triple Threat title match with Grado. After a controversial countout loss in episode 3, Sysum defeated the champion in a tag match in episode 7. In the final two episodes, Sysum earned himself a title shot and ultimately defeated Rampage to win the title. Other storylines saw the establishment of a women's championship, a Tag Team Championship tournament, and Grado's running battles with disapproving WOS executive Stu Bennett. Recurring characters have included masked monster heel Crater, treacherous heel Martin Kirby and his former partner, singing babyface Joe Hendry.

At the conclusion of episode 6 (transmitted 1 September 2018) a six-date live tour was announced for January 2019. The WOS Women's Championship changed hands four times, while Sysum made four defences of his WOS Championship against former champion Rampage. The WOS Tag Team Championship were not defended, however, as Davey Boy Smith Jr. was not on the tour.

The TV programme received a nomination for Digital Content for the Royal Television Society's East Awards 2019.

On May 8, 2019, upstart American promotion All Elite Wrestling (AEW) reached a media rights deal with ITV. When asked about this on Twitter in-regards to ITV, Wrestling Observer's Dave Meltzer responded in a tweet on 28 May 2019 that WOS Wrestling had been cancelled.

On 13 December 2019, the WOS Twitter account uploaded a teaser video.

=== 2024 revival ===
At 09:00 BST on 28 June 2024, a short teaser video was posted announcing the promotion's return with a TV taping event called "WOS: The Return". The event will be held on 14 September. Narrated by Sha Samuels, the video showed the WOS Heavyweight Championship, and the WOS logo with "The Return" written underneath. Advertised as appearing were Adam Maxted, Iestyn Rees, Joel Redman, Eddie Ryan, Sheikh El Sham, Niwa Niwa, Nathan Angel, Jake McCluskey, Ashton Smith, Session Moth Martina, Nightshade and SoCal Val.

Fightful reported that, due to trademark issues with ITV, the official name of the promotion would be shortened to WOS Wrestling. It was also announced by WOS that the promotion's programming would be broadcast through online platforms, rather than on ITV's television networks. Talent announced for the event included Grado, Sha Samuels, L.A. Taylor. On 2 August 2024, it was announced that NORTH Wrestling and Progress Wrestling announcer Tom Campbell would be providing commentary.

== Programme sales ==
Broadcasting rights to the series were licensed in India to Discovery Communications-branded channel DSport. Series 1 was transmitted on Tuesday nights at 9pm from 26 February 2019.

In the United States, Series 1 was screened on Stadium on Sunday nights 7pm EST, starting 12 May 2019, the first ever purchase of a UK wrestling programme by a US television channel.

== List of WOS Wrestling Episodes ==
=== 2013 pilot ===
No.	Recording date	Recording location	Transmission date	Matches
1	November 2013	Fairfield Hall, Croydon	unbroadcast	Karl Kramer defeated Hakan by two falls to one; Yorghos defeated Jon Ritchie by two falls to one; Alan Lee Travis defeated Joe E Legend by two falls to one to defend the LDN British Heavyweight Championship; Johnny Kidd defeated Matt Kaye by two falls to one; Zak Knight defeated Zebra Kid by two falls to one

=== New Year's Eve 2016 special ===
No.	Recording date	Recording location	Transmission date	Matches
1	1 November 2016	dock10 studios, Salford Quays	31 December 2016	Vacant World of Sport title: Dave Mastiff defeated Grado by pinfall to win the WOS Championship; Kenny Williams defeated Sam Bailey, CJ Banks and Danny Hope in a Ladder match; Viper defeated Alexis Rose by pinfall; Joe Coffey and Mark Coffey defeated Rampage and Ashton Smith by pinfall; El Ligero defeated Zack Gibson by pinfall; Grado won a Battle Royal, defeating Williams, Coffey, Coffey, Ligero, Sha Samuels, Johnny Moss and British Bulldog Jr.; World of Sport championship: Grado defeated Mastiff by pinfall to win the WOS championship

=== 2018 Series ===
No.	Recording date	Recording location	Transmission date	Matches
1	10–12 May 2018	Epic Studios, Norwich	28 July 2018	Justin Sysum won a Five-Way elimination match over Crater, Sha Samuels, Rampage and Adam Maxted) to win a shot at WOS Champion Grado. After the match, WOS Executive Stu Bennett ruled that instead, Sysum would face Rampage and Grado in a triple threat match for the title as the referee had missed Rampage also beating the count; British Bulldog Jr. defeated Will Ospreay; WOS Tag Team Championship tournament quarter final: Kip Sabian and Iestyn Rees defeated Martin Kirby and Joe Hendry; Rampage defeated Grado and Justin Sysum to win the WOS Championship in a triple threat match
2	10–12 May 2018	Epic Studios, Norwich	4 August 2018	Rampage defeated Joe Hendry by pinfall to defend the WOS Championship; Gabriel Kidd defeated Lionheart, Robbie X and Liam Slater in a Fatal Four Way lumberjack match to win a contract for "a big opportunity"; WOS Tag Team Championship tournament quarter final: Nathan Cruz and Adam Maxted defeated Doug Williams and HT Drake; Kay Lee Ray defeated Viper and Bea Priestley in a Triple Threat match to become the first WOS Women's Champion
3	10–12 May 2018	Epic Studios, Norwich	11 August 2018	Grado defeated Sha Samuels; Martin Kirby defeated Joe Hendry; WOS Tag Team Championship tournament quarter final: BT Gunn and Stevie Boy defeated Brad Slayer and CJ Banks; Crater defeated Gabriel Kidd. (This was the match from the contract Kidd won the previous week); Rampage defeated Justin Sysum to defend the WOS Championship
4	10–12 May 2018	Epic Studios, Norwich	18 August 2018	Kay Lee Ray's defence of the WOS Women's Championship against Bea Priestly ended in No Contest after Viper and Ayesha both interfered; Will Ospreay defeated Martin Kirby; WOS Tag Team Championship tournament quarter final: Grado and British Bulldog Jr. defeated Crater and Robbie X; Justin Sysum defeated Joe Hendry and Nathan Cruz in a Triple Threat Match
5	10–12 May 2018	Epic Studios, Norwich	25 August 2018	WOS Tag Team Championship tournament semi final: Kip Sabian and Iestyn Rees defeated BT Gunn and Stevie Boy; Crater defeated Liam Slater and Gabriel Kidd; WOS Tag Team Championship tournament second inal: Nathan Cruz and Adam Maxted defeated Grado and British Bulldog Jr.; WOS Women's Championship battle royal: Champion Kay Lee Ray defeated Viper, Ayesha, Bea Priestly and Casey Owens to successfully defend her title
6	10–12 May 2018	Epic Studios, Norwich	1 September 2018	Rampage defeated British Bulldog Jr. by pinfall to successfully defend the WOS Championship; Joe Hendry defeated Martin Kirby in a Submission Match: WOS Tag Team Championship tournament final: Kip Sabian and Iestyn Rees defeated Nathan Cruz and Adam Maxted to win the titles. After the match, Cruz turned on Maxted; Handicap tag match – Justin Sysum defeated CJ Banks and Sha Samuels to earn a future challenge to WOS Champion Rampage
7	10–12 May 2018	Epic Studios, Norwich	8 September 2018	Ladder match, loser leaves WOS, battle of former tag team partners: Adam Maxted defeated Nathan Cruz; Fatal four way:Gabriel Kidd beat Crater, Robbie X and Liam Slater. All other three men pinned Crater, Kidd was awarded the win as first man down; Martin Kirby used the ropes to pin Grado after both men used a toothbrush as a weapon from Grado's trademark bum-bag; Justin Sysum and Joe Hendry defeated Rampage and Sha Samuels
8	10–12 May 2018	Epic Studios, Norwich	15 September 2018	Viper defeated Ayesha to win a shot at the WOS Women's Championship; Couple vs Couple Mixed tag team match: Will Ospreay and Bea Priestly defeated Stevie Boy and Kay Lee Ray; British Bulldog Jr. defeated Iestyn Rees; Robbie X defeated Crater in a match where the goal was to pull off the opponent's mask. (The commentary team did not identify the unmasked Crater and he replaced his mask immediately after the loss)
9	10–12 May 2018	Epic Studios, Norwich	22 September 2018	Kay Lee Ray defeated Viper to successfully defend the WOS Women's Championship; Crater, Moose, Nathan Cruz, Adam Maxted, Justin Sysum, Gabriel Kidd, Sha Samuels and CJ Banks were the final eight survivors of the 16-man elimination tag team stage of Buzzer Battle, eliminating British Bulldog Jr., Kip Sabian, Iestyn Rees, Grado, Robbie X, Liam Slater, BT Gunn and Stevie Boy to advance to the Battle Royal stage; Justin Sysum won the Eight Man Battle Royal stage of the Buzzer Battle to win a shot at WOS Championship, last eliminating Crater
10	10–12 May 2018	Epic Studios, Norwich	29 September 2018	Grado and British Bulldog Jr. defeated Iestyn Rees and Kip Sabian to win the WOS Tag Team Championship; Justin Sysum defeated Rampage to win the WOS Championship

== Championship reigns ==
=== WOS Championship ===
WOS Championship

Details
- Promotion: World of Sport Wrestling
- Date established: 2 November 2016
- Date retired: 3 February 2019
Statistics
- First champion: Dave Mastiff
- Final champion: Justin Sysum
- Most reigns: All champions (1 reigns)
- Longest reign: Grado (554 days)
- Shortest reign: Dave Mastiff (<1 day)
- Oldest champion: Rampage (34 years, 276 days)
- Youngest champion: Grado (28 years, 154 days)
- Heaviest champion: Dave Mastiff (315 lbs)
- Lightest champion: Grado (235 lb)

Key
No.	Overall reign number
Reign	Reign number for the specific champion
Days	Number of days held
Days recog.	Number of days held recognized by the promotion
+	Current reign is changing daily

No.	Champion	Championship change			Reign statistics			Notes	Ref.
No.	Champion	Date	Event	Location	Reign	Days	Days recog.	Notes	Ref.
1	Dave Mastiff	2 November 2016	World Of Sport Wrestling	Manchester, England	1	<1	<1	Defeated Grado to become the inaugural champion. Aired on 31 December 2016	
2	Grado	2 November 2016	World Of Sport Wrestling	Manchester, England	1	554	574	Aired on 31 December 2016	
3	Rampage	10 May 2018	World Of Sport Wrestling	Norwich, England	1	2	63	This was a 3-Way match also involving Justin Sysum. Aired on 28 July 2018	
4	Justin Sysum	12 May 2018	World Of Sport Wrestling	Norwich, England	1	267	127	Aired on 29 September 2018	
—	Deactivated	3 February 2019	WOS Live Tour Tag 6	Norwich, England	—	—	—	The Title became deactivated when WOS held their last event.	
5	Sha Samuels	14 September 2024	WOS - Evening Show	Norwich, England	1	752+	752+	Defeated Adam Maxted for the vacant belt	

=== WOS Tag Team Championship ===
WOS Tag Team Championship

Details
- Promotion: World of Sport Wrestling
- Date established: 10 May 2018
- Date retired: 3 February 2019
Statistics
- First champions: Kip Sabian and Iestyn Rees (1 Day)
- Final champions: Grado and British Bulldog Jr.
- Most reigns: All champions (1 reigns)
- Longest reign: Grado and British Bulldog Jr. (267 days)
- Shortest reign: Kip Sabian and Iestyn Rees
- Oldest champion: Iestyn Rees (35 years)
- Youngest champion: Kip Sabian (28 years)
- Heaviest champion: Iestyn Rees 251 lb (114 kg)
- Lightest champion: Kip Sabian 180 lb (82 kg)

Key
No.	Overall reign number
Reign	Reign number for the specific champion
Days	Number of days held
Days recog.	Number of days held recognized by the promotion
+	Current reign is changing daily

No.	Champion	Championship change			Reign statistics			Notes	Ref.
No.	Champion	Date	Event	Location	Reign	Days	Days recog.	Notes	Ref.
1	Alpha Bad (Iestyn Rees and Kip Sabian)	11 May 2018	World Of Sport Wrestling	Norwich, England	1	1	28	Defeated Nathan Cruz and Adam Maxted in a tournament final to win the title. Aired on 1 September 2018	
2	British Bulldog Jr. and Grado	12 May 2018	World Of Sport Wrestling	Norwich, England	1	267	127	Aired on 29 September 2018	
—	Deactivated	3 February 2019	WOS Live Tour Tag 6	Norwich, England	—	—	—	The Title became deactivated when WOS held their last event.	
3	UK Pitbulls (Big Dave & Bulk)	14 September 2024	WOS - Evening Show	Norwich, England	1	752+	752+	Defeated CW Davies & Jack Landers for the vacant belts	

=== WOS Women's Championship ===
WOS Women's Championship

Details
- Promotion: World of Sport Wrestling
- Date established: 10 May 2018
- Date retired: 3 February 2019
Statistics
- First champion: Kay Lee Ray
- Final champion: Katy Lees
- Most reigns: Viper (2 reigns)
- Longest reign: Kay Lee Ray (253 days)
- Shortest reign: Viper (1 day)
- Oldest champion: Kay Lee Ray (28 years)
- Heaviest champion: Viper 207 lbs (94 kg)

Key
No.	Overall reign number
Reign	Reign number for the specific champion
Days	Number of days held
Days recog.	Number of days held recognized by the promotion
+	Current reign is changing daily

No.	Champion	Championship change			Reign statistics			Notes	Ref.
No.	Champion	Date	Event	Location	Reign	Days	Days recog.	Notes	Ref.
1	Kay Lee Ray	10 May 2018	World of Sport Wrestling	Norwich, Norfolk	1	253	167	Defeated Viper and Bea Priestley to win the title. Aired on 4 August 2018	
2	Viper	18 January 2019	WOS Wrestling UK Tour 2019	Southampton, Hampshire	1	1	1	This was a 3-way match also including Bea Priestley	
3	Bea Priestley	19 January 2019	WOS Wrestling UK Tour 2019	Newport, Gwent	1	7	7		
4	Viper	26 January 2019	WOS Wrestling UK Tour 2019	Blackpool, Lancashire	2	8	8		
5	Katy Lees	3 February 2019	WOS Wrestling UK Tour 2019	Bethnal Green, Greater London	1	<1	<1	This was a 3-way match also including Bea Priestley	
—	Deactivated	3 February 2019	WOS Live Tour Tag 6	Norwich, England	—	—	—	The Title became deactivated when WOS held their last event.	
6	Alex Windsor	14 September 2024	WOS - Evening Show	Norwich, England	1	752+	752+	Defeated LA Taylor for the vacant belt in the finals of the WOS Women's Title Tournament	

== See also ==
- List of professional wrestling promotions in Great Britain and Ireland
- List of professional wrestling television series
