= Sha Samuels =

English Professional Wrestler

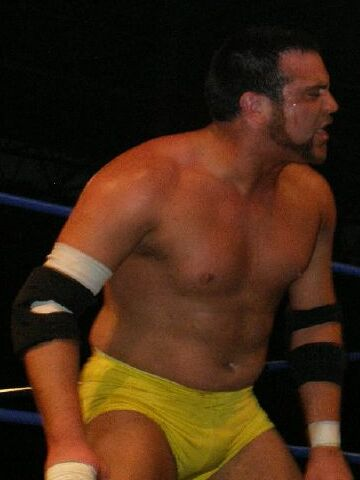

Personal information
- Born: Shaaheen Hosseinpour; 27 February 1985 (age 41) London, England, UK
- Spouse: Wipha Singwirat
- Children: 2

Professional wrestling career
- Ring name(s): Sha Samuels; Ed Harvey; Sirius
- Billed height: 185 cm (6 ft 1 in)
- Billed weight: 97.5 kg (215 lb)
- Billed from: London, United Kingdom
- Trained by: Dino Scarlo; Mel Stuart

Shaaheen Hosseinpour (born 27 February 1985), better known by the ring name Sha Samuels, is an English professional wrestler performing for Revolution Pro Wrestling (RevPro), where he is a former two-time Undisputed British Heavyweight Champion. He is also known for his time in WWE where he performed on the NXT UK brand.

== Professional wrestling career ==
=== Insane Championship Wrestling (2014–present) ===
Sha Samuels debuted for Insane Championship Wrestling in 2014 in London, teaming alongside Rob Cage & Jackie Polo, in a losing effort against Grado, Wolfgang & Noam Dar. Samuels quickly become embroiled in a rivalry against Grado, with Sha tormenting Grado for months, leading to a singles match between the two at Fear & Loathing VII at the Barrowland Ballroom. Sha would be victorious in this match, after Martin Stone became involved in the contest.

The following year, Sha aligned himself with James R. Kennedy's faction, The 55, composed of Sha, Kid Fite, Timm Wylie, Martin Kirby & Bram. Often acting as hired mercenaries for The Black Label, the team of Samuels & Kid Fite would eventually target Polo Promotions and the ICW Tag Team Championships. After a number of contests between the teams, including a match at Fear & Loathing VIII, The 55 would eventually capture the titles at the final event of 2015. Sha & Fite would remain champions until Barramania II, on 3 April 2016, losing the titles back to Polo Promotions.

At Shug's Hoose Party 3, Sha would shock the ICW fans, when he defected from The Black Label to join Mark Dallas's team, aligning with Grado & Noam Dar against Drew Galloway, Wolfgang & Jack Jester, to win Dallas 50% of the company back from Red Lightning. This story would continue for the rest of the year, with Team Dallas (Sha Samuels, DCT, Chris Renfrew & Grado) defeating The Black Label (Drew Galloway, Jack Jester, Bram & Kid Fite) to gain 100% control of ICW. In the aftermath of this, Sha continued to feud with former tag team partner Kid Fite, leading to a Glasgow Street Fight at Barramania 3, which involved Sha almost being run down by a car, and both men fighting inside the legendary Barras market, before Sha picked up the win, ending the feud.

That same night, Sha was assaulted by his former friend Grado, who signed with Rudo Sports & Entertainment Brand, headed by the returning Red Lightning. After months of refusing to face Grado, Sha eventually agreed, and defeated Grado in a Loser Leaves ICW match at Shug's Hoose Party 4. That same weekend, Sha also teamed with Noam Dar in a special one-off match, against Bram and then-ICW World Heavyweight Champion Joe Coffey.

Sha then began teaming with Jack Jester as The Kinky Party, an odd-couple pairing that became extremely popular with fans. After being attacked by the Kings Of Catch, Sha & Jester challenged the young team to a match at Fear & Loathing, which The Kinky Party would go on to win. With their eyes set on the ICW Tag Team Championships, The Kinky Party eventually faced The P.O.D (Rampage Brown & Ashton Smith) for the titles in Newcastle, successfully capturing them. This began an almost 8 month reign, in which The Kinky Party found themselves at odds with ALPHA/EVIL (Bram & Iestyn Rees). After defending the titles against ALPHA/EVIL for a second time at Fear & Loathing XI, The Kinky Party would lose the titles back to The P.O.D that same night, with Ashton & Rampage cashing in their title match opportunity that they had won earlier in the evening.

After unsuccessfully attempting to regain the titles, Sha & Jester have become embroiled in a rivalry with The Anti-Fun Police.

=== World of Sport Wrestling (2017) ===
On 23 March 2017 Impact Wrestling announced that they would be teaming with ITV to yet again bring back World of Sport Wrestling with Jeff Jarrett as an executive producer as a ten episode series. The show was announced to be taping at Preston Guild Hall on 25 and 26 May. Samuels was confirmed as one of the independent wrestlers to be part of the roster.

=== WWE NXT UK (2021–2022) ===
In January 2021, Samuels profile was added to the WWE Performance Center roster, indicating that he has signed with WWE. On the 14 January episode of NXT UK, Sha made his debut under the name Ed Harvey, in a losing effort against Joe Coffey, however, during the match, Samuels renounced the "Ed Harvey" name and declared himself to be "Sha Samuels", with the announcers referring to him as such for the remainder of the match. Since that point onwards, Samuels was associated with his long-time friend Noam Dar on the NXT UK programming.

On 18 August 2022, Samuels was released from his WWE contract.

== Championships and accomplishments ==
- 4 Front Wrestling
  - 4FW Heavyweight Championship (1 time)
- Catch Wrestling Council
  - CWC Tag Team Championship (1 time) – with Terry Frazier
- Extreme World Warfare
  - EWF Tag Team Championship (1 time) – with Terry Frazier
- Insane Championship Wrestling
  - ICW Zero-G Championship (1 time)
  - ICW Tag Team Championship (2 times) – with Kid Fite (1) and Jack Jester (1)
  - Lionheart League (2021)
- Iron Girders Pro Wrestling
  - ACME Wrestling Interpromotional Championship (1 time)
- International Pro Wrestling: United Kingdom
  - IPW:UK Championship (1 time)
  - IPW:UK Tag Team Championship (1 time) – with Terry Frazier
- Over the Top Wrestling
  - OTT Tag Team Championship (1 time) – with Zack Gibson and Charlie Sterling (Freebird Rule)
- Preston City Wrestling
  - PCW Heavyweight Championship (1 time)
  - PCW Tag Team Championship (2 times) – with Lionheart (1), Jack Jester (1)
- Pro Wrestling Illustrated
  - Ranked No. 147 of the top 500 singles wrestlers in the PWI 500 in 2026
- Revolution Pro Wrestling
  - Undisputed British Heavyweight Championship (2 times)
  - RPW Undisputed British Tag Team Championship (4 times) – with Terry Frazier (2), James Castle (1) and Josh Bodom (1)
  - Revolution Rumble (2025)
- Rock and Metal Wrestling Action
  - RAMWA Tag Team Championship (2 times) – with Terry Frazier
- Target Wrestling
  - Target Wrestling Championship (1 time)
- SAS Wrestling
  - Declaration of War Tournament (2009)
- The Wrestling League
  - Wrestling League Heavyweight Championship (1 time)
- World of Sport Wrestling
  - WOS Championship (1 time, current)
- Westside Xtreme Wrestling
  - wXw World Tag Team Championship (1 time) – with Terry Frazier
- WrestleForce
  - WrestleForce World Heavyweight Championship (1 time)
  - WrestleForce International Championship (1 time, current)
  - League of Champions Tournament (2014)
