= Bea Priestley =

English-New Zealander professional wrestler (born 1996)

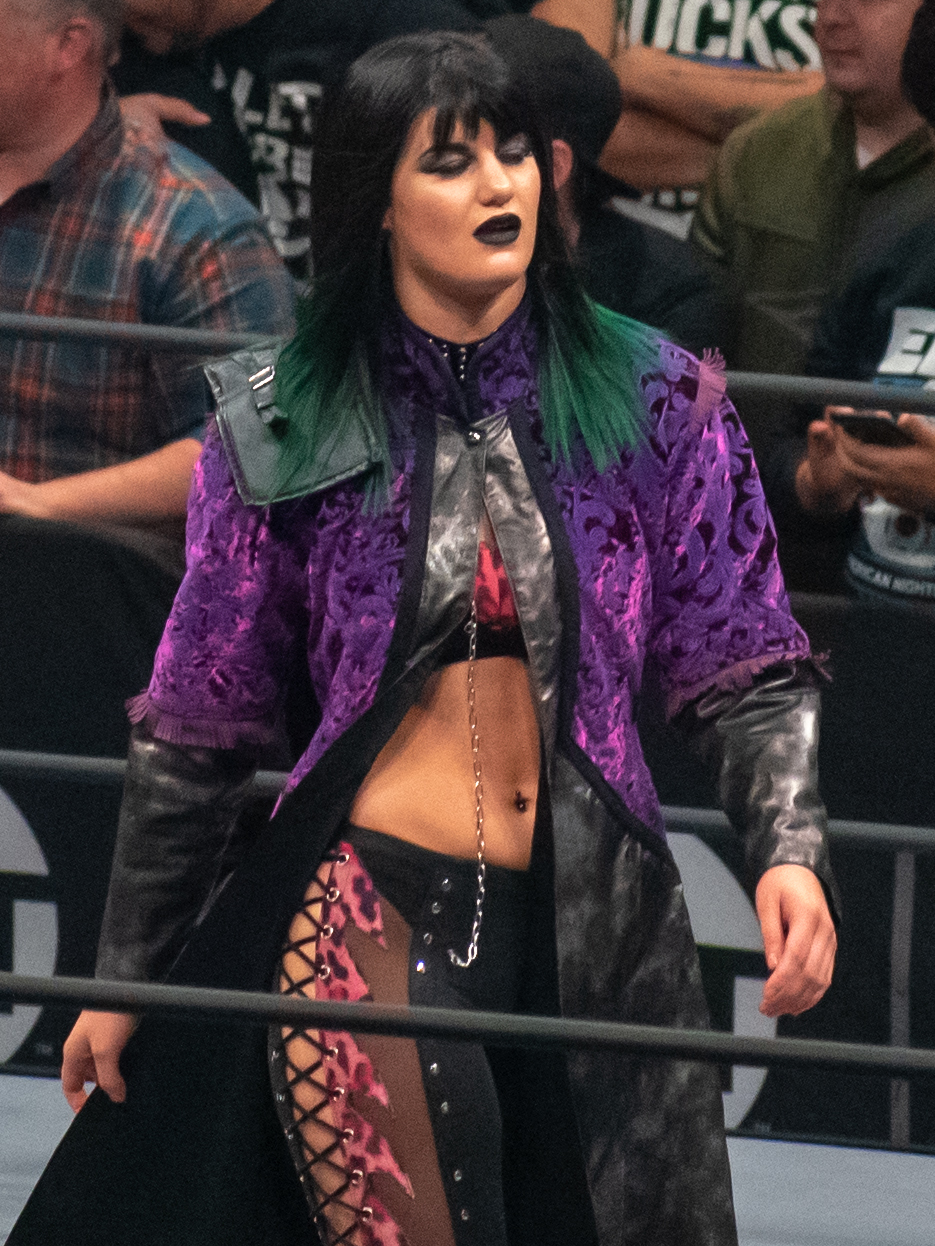
- Priestley in October 2019

Personal information
- Born: Beatrice St. Claire Priestley; 22 March 1996 (age 30) Harrogate, North Yorkshire, England
- Spouse: Riley Osborne (m. 2024)

Professional wrestling career
- Ring name(s): Amy St. Clere; Bea Priestley; Blair Davenport; Tammy Leigh
- Billed height: 170 cm (5 ft 7 in)
- Billed weight: 64 kg (141 lb)
- Billed from: Wellington, New Zealand
- Trained by: Travis Banks
- Debut: 2012

Beatrice St. Claire Priestley (born 22 March 1996) is an English-New Zealander professional wrestler. She is currently signed to World Wonder Ring Stardom, where she performs under her real name (stylized as Bea Priestley) and is a member of H.A.T.E.. She previously performed in WWE under the ring name Blair Davenport. Priestley is also known for her appearances in All Elite Wrestling (AEW), World of Sport Wrestling, Defiant Wrestling, and Progress Wrestling.

== Professional wrestling career ==
=== Early career (2012-2016) ===
Born in Harrogate, England, Priestley moved to Wellington, New Zealand, at the age of 10. Priestley began training at New Zealand Wide Pro Wrestling's developmental facility under Travis Banks, and debuted for the company as Amy St. Clere when she was 16 years old. After four years, during which she also wrestled for Impact Pro Wrestling as Beatrice Priestley and the Hughes Academy as Tami-Leigh, Priestley returned to England to further her career, training in Progress Wrestling's developmental program 'The Projo'.

=== Progress Wrestling (2016–2019) ===
Priestley made her debut for Progress Wrestling on 13 March 2016, being defeated by Elizabeth. In December 2016, Priestley participated in the tournament to crown the first ever Progress Women's Champion where Priestley lost to the eventual winner Toni Storm. Throughout the year of 2017 and 2018, Priestley would mainly compete in six-man tag team matches and even feuding with Millie McKenzie.

=== What Culture Pro Wrestling / Defiant Wrestling (2016–2019) ===
Priestley debuted for What Culture Pro Wrestling (WCPW) on 27 July at Loaded #5, losing to Nixon Newell, but she defeated Newell the following day. On 24 August Priestley and Newell faced off once again, this time in a Last Woman Standing match to crown the first ever WCPW Women's Champion, won by Newell. Priestley unsuccessfully challenged Newell once again at Loaded #19, this time by disqualification. After the match, Priestley's Pacitti Club stablemates The Swords of Essex put Newell out of action and Priestley stole her title, declaring herself "the true Women's Champion". Priestley lost her stolen WCPW Women's Championship to the returning Newell at WCPW True Destiny in February, who had replaced Tessa Blanchard in the match. One day later Priestley regained the WCPW Women's Championship, defeating Nixon Newell in a No Disqualification match.

On 16 June 2017 Priestley was unable to compete, and her replacement Viper lost the title by pinfall to Kay Lee Ray. After that, Priestley would feud with Viper until the last episode of Loaded, where Priestley defeated Viper to end the feud. On 17 June 2018 Priestley defeated Millie McKenzie to regain the Defiant Women's Championship. On 3 December 2018 Priestley lost the title to Kanji in a Gauntlet match involving Kay Lee Ray, Lana Austin, Little Miss Roxxy, and Millie McKenzie.

=== World Wonder Ring Stardom (2017–2021) ===
On 14 October 2017 Priestley made her debut for the World Wonder Ring Stardom promotion by entering the Goddesses of Stardom Tag League tournament. Days before the final of the tournament Priestley unsuccessfully challenged Toni Storm for the SWA World and World of Stardom Championship in Stardom event in Taiwan. She ended up winning the tournament along with Kelly Klein. Following the tournament, Priestley and Klein unsuccessfully challenged Oedo Tai (Hana Kimura and Kagetsu) for the Goddesses of Stardom Championship. In her six-month stay in Stardom, Priestley made it to the finals of the 2018 Cinderella Tournament, before losing to the eventual winner Momo Watanabe. At Mask Fiesta 2018 on 28 October 2018, Davenport dressed up as Marty Scurll and teamed up with Candy Skull in a win over Hanita and La Maestra.

On 4 May 2019, at Golden Week Stars 2019 Queen's Quest Produce, Priestley defeated Kagetsu for the World of Stardom Championship.

In January 2020, Priestley paired with Oedo Tai member Jamie Hayter to capture the Goddesses of Stardom Championship, the first foreign tag team to hold the championships. She would later join the villainous Oedo Tai faction after betraying Queen's Quest stable-mate Momo Watanabe. On 20 July 2020, Stardom stripped the tag titles from Priestley and Hayter, as the duo could not defend the titles in Japan due to the COVID-19 pandemic. Priestley made her return to the company on 19 September, where she attacked Saya Iida in her match against Natsuko Tora, and later attacked Momo Watanabe and Utami Hayashishita. On 3 October at Yokohama Cinderella, Priestley defeated Watanabe to win the vacant SWA World Championship.

=== World of Sport (2018–2019) ===
At 5 May 2018 tapings of the newly revived World of Sport Wrestling, Priestley failed to win the vacant WOS Women's Championship in a three-way match against Kay Lee Ray and Viper. She unsuccessfully challenged Ray for the title on subsequent episodes in a battle royal and a singles match against Ray after being attacked by Viper. On 19 January 2019, on a WOS house show tour, Priestley won the title in a singles match when she successfully pinned Viper. On 2 February 2019 Priestley lost the title to Viper after that she left the promotion.

=== All Elite Wrestling (2019–2020) ===
On 22 January 2019 it was reported that Priestley was close to signing a contract with All Elite Wrestling (AEW) after turning down a WWE contract. It was announced on the edition of 27 February 2019 of "Road To Double Or Nothing" that Priestley would be joining the company, and would be making her debut at Fight for the Fallen on 13 July 2019, where she would team with Shoko Nakajima to defeat Britt Baker and Riho. She entered an on-screen feud with Britt Baker after legitimately concussing Baker after kicking her in the back of the head. Ending their feud, where Baker openly referred to Priestley as "un-professional", Priestley eventually lost the conclusive singles match of this feud to Baker at Full Gear. On the Thanksgiving Eve special episode of Dynamite, Priestly and Emi Sakura defeated Hikaru Shida and Kris Statlander. Priestley appeared on 11 December 2019 edition of Dark, where she was defeated by "the Alien" Kris Statlander.

On 11 March 2020 episode of Dynamite, Priestley returned and teamed with AEW Women's World Champion Nyla Rose to defeat the team of Hikaru Shida and Kris Statlander. After the match she attacked Rose and called her shot at the AEW Women's World Championship. Priestley was released from AEW on 13 August 2020 due to being unable to travel from her home in Japan due to restrictions from COVID-19.

=== New Japan Pro-Wrestling (2020–2021) ===
On 16 October 2020, Priestley made her debut appearance in New Japan Pro-Wrestling, where she interfered in her boyfriend Will Ospreay's match against Kazuchika Okada in the G1 Climax.

=== WWE (2021–2025) ===
==== NXT UK and NXT (2021–2024) ====
On 24 June 2021, it was reported that Priestley signed a contract with WWE, where a vignette aired promoting Priestley's arrival to the NXT UK brand with her new ring name Blair Davenport. Davenport would score a winning streak over several opponents such as Xia Brookside, Nina Samuels, Emilia McKenzie and many more until she seized an opportunity to challenge Meiko Satomura for the NXT UK Women's Championship. On 6 January 2022 episode of NXT UK, Davenport failed to capture the title from Satomura, marking her first loss in NXT UK. On 23 August 2022 episode of NXT 2.0, Davenport made her in-ring debut for the NXT brand and collected her first win over Indi Hartwell, and was then confronted by the NXT Women's Champion Mandy Rose and the NXT UK Women's Champion Satomura, which set up a triple threat match to unify both the NXT UK Women's Championship and the NXT Women's Championship at the Worlds Collide on 4 September, where Davenport lost when she was pinned by Rose.

On 30 May 2023 episode of NXT, Davenport was revealed to be the attacker that left many of the women's division on the shelf. She made her in-ring return, where she defeated Dani Palmer the following week. On 9 December at NXT Deadline, Davenport won the women's Iron Survivor Challenge to earn an NXT Women's Championship match against Lyra Valkyria at NXT: New Year's Evil, where Davenport failed to win the title at the event. On 5 March at NXT: Roadblock, Davenport was defeated by Fallon Henley after a returning Sol Ruca cost her a match. On the 2 April episode of NXT, Davenport was defeated by Ruca. Two weeks later, Davenport knocked Ruca off the top rope, costing her a match against Lola Vice. Later that night backstage, NXT General Manager Ava scheduled a match between the two for Spring Breakin' in a Beach Brawl match, where Davenport lost in her final match for NXT.

==== SmackDown (2024–2025) ====
At Night 2 of the 2024 WWE Draft, Davenport was promoted to the SmackDown brand. On the 28 June episode of SmackDown, Davenport made her main roster debut but she failed to qualify for the women's Money in the bank ladder match in a qualifier triple threat match that included Naomi and Indi Hartwell, where Naomi won. On the 2 August episode of SmackDown during the tag team title match between WWE Women's Tag Team Champion The Unholy Union (Alba Fyre and Isla Dawn) and Bianca Belair and Jade Cargill, Davenport attacked Cargill, which resulted in The Unholy Union retaining their championship by disqualification while forming a short-lived alliance with Davenport.

Davenport's last televised match was on the 22 November 2024 episode of SmackDown where she lost in the first round of tournament to crown the inaugural Women's United States Champion. On 7 February 2025, Priestley was released from WWE, thus ending her four-year run with the company. Prior to her release, Priestley was originally planned to join Chelsea Green's Secret Hervice stable. Her spot was then given to Alba Fyre.

=== Return to NJPW (2025–present) ===
On 9 May 2025 at Resurgence, Priestley made her return to NJPW, where she defeated Viva Van.

=== Return to World Wonder Ring Stardom (2025–present) ===
==== STARS (2025–2026) ====
On 5 July 2025, it was announced that Priestley would make her return to Stardom as a participant in the 2025 Stardom 5 Star Grand Prix, where she was placed in Red Stars A Block. Priestley finished her block with 10 points which included a win over the reigning World of Stardom Champion Saya Kamitani and advanced to the playoffs, where she was eliminated in the first round by Rina. On 14 September, Priestley joined the Stars unit. In November, Priestley teamed with stabelmate Saya Iida in the 2025 Goddesses of Stardom Tag League. The duo were placed in A Block and finished with 8 points, before being eliminated in the first round by Aya Sakura and Sayaka Kurara of Cosmic Angels.

At Stardom Supreme Fight 2026 on 7 February 2026, Priestley and Hanan unsuccessfully challenged BMI2000 (Natsuko Tora and Ruaka) for the Goddesses of Stardom Championship.

==== H.A.T.E (2026–present) ====
On 26 April at Stardom All Star Grand Queendom 2026, Priestley turned heel and joined H.A.T.E. after attacking Hanan and her now-former Stars stablemates.

== Other media ==
Priestley made her video game debut in Fire Pro Wrestling World as part of the STARDOM DLC. She made her WWE game debut in the Revel with Wyatt Pack on WWE 2K23 and in WWE 2K24.

== Personal life ==
Priestley was diagnosed with a brain tumor when she was 14 years old. She underwent surgery to remove it at 18 years old.

From 2017 to 2021, she was in a relationship with Will Ospreay. In 2022, she started dating fellow professional wrestler Riley Osborne.

On 19 December 2023, Priestley announced on her Instagram page that she and Osborne are engaged. On 26 July 2024, the two got married.

== Championships and accomplishments ==
- What Culture Pro Wrestling / Defiant Wrestling
  - WCPW/Defiant Women's Championship (2 times)
- Fight Forever Wrestling
  - Fight Forever Women's World Championship (1 time)
- Pro Wrestling Illustrated
  - Ranked No. 20 of the top 100 female singles wrestlers in the PWI Women's 100 in 2019
  - Ranked No. 29 of the top 50 tag teams in the PWI Tag Team 50 in 2020 with Jamie Hayter
- World of Sport Wrestling
  - WOS Women's Championship (1 time)
- World Wonder Ring Stardom
  - Artist of Stardom Championship (1 time) – with Natsuko Tora and Saki Kashima
  - Goddesses of Stardom Championship (2 times) – with Jamie Hayter (1) and Konami (1)
  - SWA World Championship (1 time)
  - Goddesses of Stardom Tag League (2017) – with Kelly Klein
  - World of Stardom Championship (1 time)
  - Trios Tag Team Tournament (2019) – with Utami Hayashishita and Viper
  - Stardom Year-End Award (1 time)
    - Outstanding Performance Award (2020)
- WWE
  - Women's Iron Survivor Challenge (2023)
