= Neil Bratchpiece =

Scottish comedian

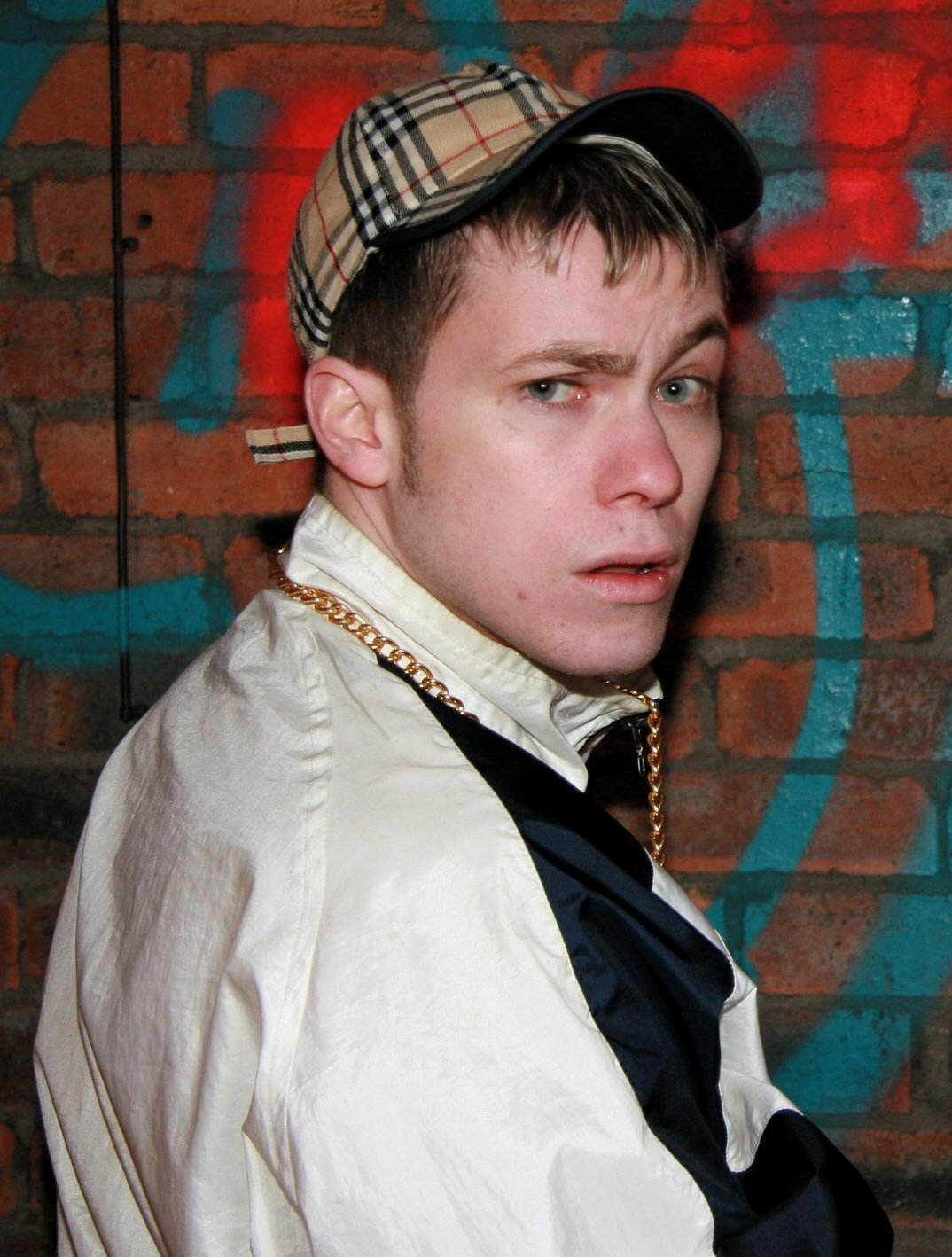
- Bratchpiece as The Wee Man, 2007
- Born: 24 October 1983; Motherwell, Scotland
- Other names: The Wee Man
- Occupation(s): Comedian, actor
- Years active: 2007–present
- Known for: Playing The Wee Man

Neil Bratchpiece (born 24 October 1983) is a Scottish comedian, actor and writer who initially found fame through his comedy persona as The Wee Man. He rose to prominence in 2007 when he appeared in the YouTube video "Here You (That'll Be Right)" by NEDS Kru which became a viral success. He has made regular stand-up and comedy club appearances, including alongside his brother and father. His performances have included "Comedian Rap Battle" sketches and Insane Championship Wrestling performances. Over several years, Bratchpiece has been an active YouTuber, appearing in character in multiple videos.

== Early life ==
Bratchpiece was born in Motherwell, North Lanarkshire, Scotland, on 24 October 1983, into a family of Jewish descent and attended Dalziel High School. His father Mark, and brother David were both stand-up comedians. Bratchpiece started his involvement in comedy whilst at school, winning the Glasgow heat of the Fanta Teen Comedy Awards with a friend, then performing in the finals at the Comedy Store in London. He studied English, Film and Television Studies at the University of Glasgow.

== Viral YouTube video ==
The Wee Man character first rose to prominence when he appeared in the viral YouTube video "Here You (That'll Be Right)" by NEDS Kru which had a million views by the start of August 2007. By 2021, the video had garnered over 4.5 million views and featured the character fulfilling the role of a stereotypical Scottish "ned", drinking Buckfast Tonic Wine.

== Live performance ==
Bratchpiece continued to perform regular shows with family members. A later regular show was styled around a pub quiz. By 2012 they had performed at the Glasgow International Comedy Festival for ten consecutive years. They were booked as a comedy act for the RockNess 2012 festival. In 2014 he performed in Keir McAllister's dark comedic play Hindsight.

He was involved with "Comedian Rap Battle" performances, which brought a Scottish take on rap battling. Performing in Glasgow initially, the rhythm was different from normal comedy performances, but with Ro Campbell he took the concept to the Edinburgh Festival Fringe in 2013, and gained some praise. He performed at the T in the Park in 2014.

== Writing ==
Bratchpiece had entered sketch writing through an unusual route, however he established himself as a regular performer on the Scottish stand-up comedy circuit. At the Scottish Comedy Awards, he won the category of Best Writer in 2017 and made the shortlist in 2019.

== Insane Championship Wrestling ==
Since 2010, The Wee Man character has appeared as a manager, occasional commentator and occasional wrestler for Insane Championship Wrestling (ICW), a Scottish-based professional wrestling promotion. In ICW, he managed a tag team called 'The Bucky Boys', consisting of Davey Boy and Stevie Boy, using a boisterous ned gimmick for the stable. The team were featured prominently in a documentary produced by Vice magazine called 'The British Wrestler'. The company has since risen to prominence through the BBC Scotland documentary Insane Fight Club.

== Television ==
Bratchpiece has made several television appearances, including BBC Scotland sitcom Scot Squad, Episode 1.5 in 2014), and Channel 4 show Scotland in a Day. He has also performed on radio, most notably as part of sketch group Endemic on BBC Radio 4 show Sketchorama.

=== Other work ===
In May 2009, Bratchpiece travelled to Sweden with five other theatrical performers as part of an international cultural exchange.

In 2014 Colin McCredie and Des McLean took part in his "Parliamo Glasgow" sketch, which also featured the wrestlers Mark Dallas, Drew Galloway and Grado.

Other videos included "Manky Xmas", "Da Fleeto" and "Banter". Cameos in subsequent videos have included Robert Florence, Tom Urie, Raymond Mearns, Gavin Mitchell, Janey Godley and Rhino.

In 2015, he pulled a stunt with a stage invasion on English comedian Lee Nelson's Fringe show.
