= Liam Slater =

British professional wrestler (born 1993)

Personal information
- Born: 7 October 1993 (age 33) Keighley, West Yorkshire, England

Professional wrestling career
- Ring name(s): Liam Slater; Liam Lazarus
- Billed height: 5 ft 10 in (1.78 m)
- Billed weight: 181 lb (82 kg)
- Billed from: Keighley
- Trained by: El Ligero
- Debut: 2012

Liam Slater (born 7 October 1993) is a British professional wrestler. He currently performs on the British independent circuit – predominantly for North Wrestling and Revolution Pro Wrestling (RevPro), where he is the leader of The Slater Dojo.

== Professional wrestling career ==
=== British independent circuit (2012–present) ===
Liam started training at UK Wrestling, Wakefield in 2012 under MVK Valkabious. He went on to win the UKW Academy Championship soon after his debut until being defeated a year later by Rocky Future. Liam then began training under El Ligero, and (using the name Liam Lazarus) worked for a variety of independent UK promotions, including Great British Wrestling, Megaslam Wrestling, ICE Wrestling and Tidal Championship Wrestling. While working for TCW, Lazarus engaged in a feud with Rampage Brown over possession of the TCW Championship. Having defeated former champion and mentor El Ligero, Lazarus captured the title from Brown in a singles match at Silent Nightmare but was knocked out at one point during the bout. Due to the nature of his victory, Brown constantly challenged Lazarus to prove the validity of his championship status while preparing for their rematch. Lazarus fought successful defences against Joey Hayes, Morgan Webster, Johnny Gargano, Martin Kirby, Kenny Williams and Jackie Polo, before facing Brown in a rematch at High Tide 2015 under last man standing rules, a match which Lazarus won following interference from long-time rival Sean Only. He eventually lost the title to Dara Diablo on 27 September at Against All Odds 2 in a four corners chair match which also featured El Ligero and Matt Myers. Diablo defeated El Ligero to win the match, meaning Liam Lazarus lost his title without being pinned or submitting.

=== New Generation Wrestling (2013–2017) ===
Slater made his NGW debut in May 2013 at their Ambition house show, wrestling Ricky Halestorm to a no contest. He has spent most of his time with NGW working as enhancement talent, competing and losing in matches against wrestlers including Zack Gibson, Rampage Brown, Joseph Connors, Justin Sysum, Mike Hitchman and Dara Diablo. He enjoyed greater success as a tag team wrestler with partner Dan James, earning his first televised victory against The Control in a six-man tag with alongside James and Justin Sysum at the NGW 7th Anniversary show. At Ultimate Showdown, James abandoned Slater during a tag team match with The Proven, turning heel and beginning a feud between the two. He would go on to interfere in a match between Slater and 'The Righteous' Joseph Connors at Collision Course 2015, costing Slater the victory and seemingly allying himself with Connors.

=== What Culture Pro Wrestling/ Defiant Wrestling (2016–2017) ===
At WCPW Stacked Slater made his What Culture Pro Wrestling debut as he teamed with Gabriel Kidd as they were defeated by Martin Kirby & Travis Banks. At WCPW True Legacy Slater would team with Johnny Moss as they defeated Moustache Mountain (Trent Seven & Tyler Bate) in the First Match of the WCPW Tag Team Championship Tournament. On WCPW Loaded #16 Slater and Moss defeated Prospect (Alex Gracie & Lucas Archer) in the Semi Final Match of the WCPW Tag Team Championship Tournament. At WCPW Delete WCPW Slater and Moss defeated The Coffey Brothers (Joe Coffey & Mark Coffey) in the Final Match of the WCPW Tag Team Championship Tournament as they were crowd the first WCPW Tag Team Championship. Slater and Moss made their first championship defence against Pete Dunne & Travis Banks. At WCPW True Destiny Slater and Moss lost the WCPW Tag Team Championship to The Swords of Essex (Scott Wainwright & Will Ospreay) in a fatal four-way tag ladder match, the match also included El Ligero & Gabriel Kidd and Prospect (Alex Gracie & Lucas Archer). At WCPW Exit Wounds Slater was unsuccessful at winning the WCPW Internet Championship against Cody Rhodes. At WCPW's last ever Loaded, he then began showing signs of a heel turn, becoming a silent and showing detentions towards the debuting Pastor William Eaver. At #WeAreDefiant, Slater cemented his heel turn by costing Gabriel Kidd a match against Eaver, not only by counting a pinfall, but also attacking Prince Ameen from behind, thus aligning himself with Eaver. On the 15 December episode of Defiant, he and Eaver defeated Kidd and Ameen in a tag, in which Jurn Simmons interfered in.

== Championships and accomplishments ==
- North Wrestling
  - North Championship (1 time)
- Absolute Wrestling
  - King Of The North (2015)
- Tidal Championship Wrestling
  - TCW Championship (1 time)
  - TCW Open Championship (1 time)
- Main Event Wrestling
  - MEW North East Championship (1 time)
- Grapple Wrestling
  - Grapple Tag Team Championship (1 time) - with Mike Rolls
- Great British Wrestling
  - GBW Championship (1 time)
- Revolution Pro Wrestling
  - Undisputed British Tag Team Championship (1 time) – with Leon Slater
- RISE Underground Pro Wrestling
  - ASCENT Tournament (2021)
- UK Wrestling
  - Academy Championship (1 time)
- What Culture Pro Wrestling
  - WCPW Tag Team Championship (1 time, inaugural) - with Johnny Moss
