= British Tag Team Championship (RevPro) =

Professional wrestling tag team championship

Undisputed British Tag Team Championship
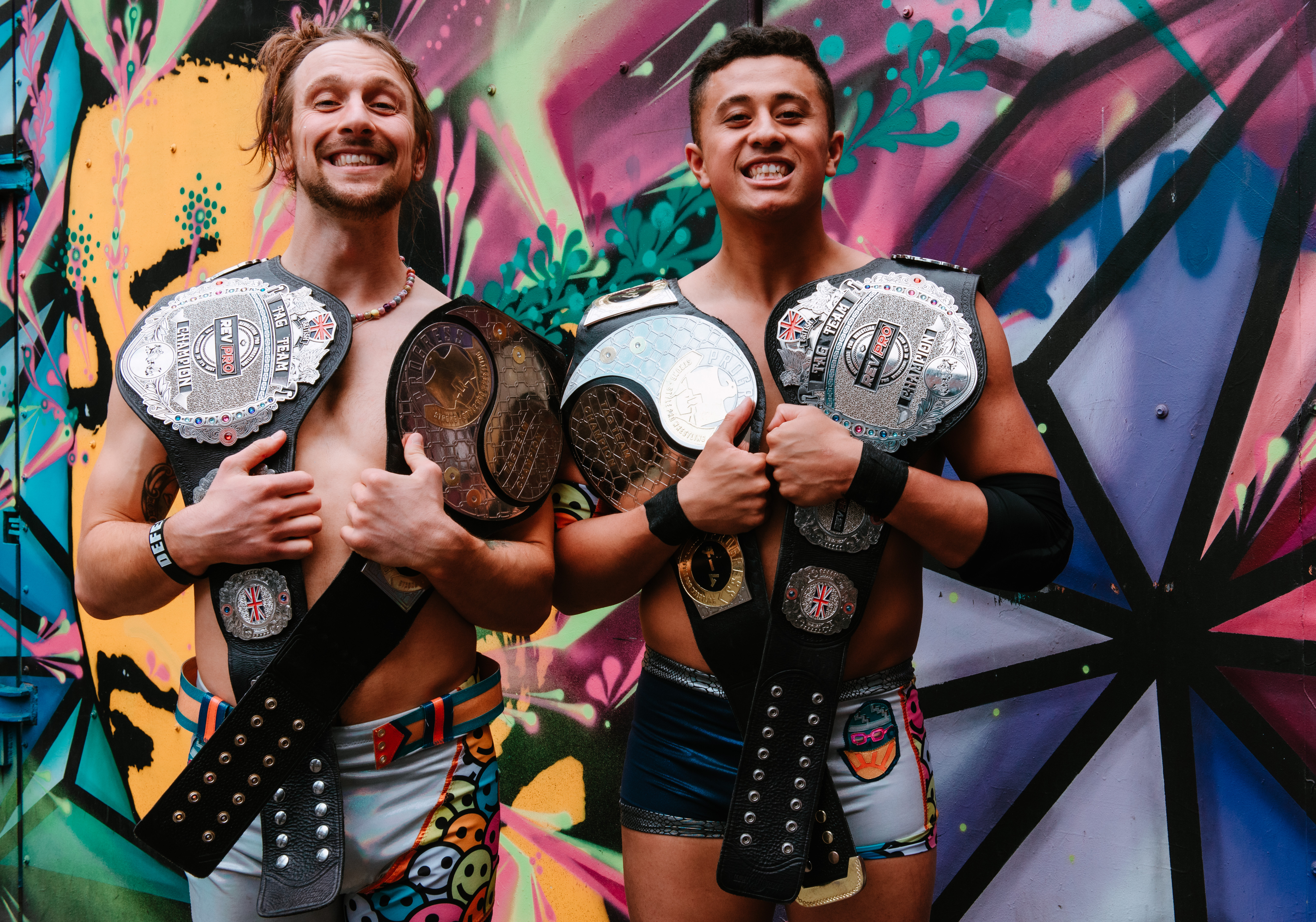
- Sunshine Machine (Chuck Mambo and TK Cooper) with the titles on their left shoulder in 2022.

Details
- Promotion: Revolution Pro Wrestling
- Date established: July 17, 2005
- Current champions: FTR (Dax Harwood and Cash Wheeler)
- Date won: August 29, 2026

Other names
- IPW:UK Tag Team Championship (2005 - 2013); British Tag Team Championship (2013 - 2017); Undisputed British Tag Team Championship (2017 - present)
Statistics
- First champions: AK-47 (Ashe and Kris Linell)
- Most reigns: As tag team (2 reigns): Aussie Open; The Kartel; The Leaders of the New School; Sunshine Machine; The Thrillers; As individual (4 reigns): Joel Redman; Sha Samuels
- Longest reign: The Leaders of the New School (630 days)
- Shortest reign: The Inner City Machine Guns (1 day)

The Undisputed British Tag Team Championship is a professional wrestling championship owned by the Revolution Pro Wrestling (RevPro/RPW) promotion. The title was created and debuted on 17 July 2005. The inaugural champions were AK-47 (Ashe and Kris Linell).

The current champions are FTR (Dax Harwood and Cash Wheeler), who are in their first reign as a team and individually. They won the title by defeating Cowboy Way (Thomas Shire and 1 Called Manders), at RevPro 14 Year Anniversary Show in London, on August 29, 2026.

== Title history ==
As of November 14, 2026, there have been 36 reigns shared between 31 different teams consisting of 59 distinctive champions with three vacancies. The inaugural champions were AK-47 (Ashe and Kris Linell). The teams of Aussie Open, The Kartel, The Leaders of the New School, Sunshine Machine and The Thrillers have the most reigns as a team at two, while individually, Joel Redman and Sha Samuels have the most with four. The team with the longest reign is The Leaders of the New School (Marty Scurll and Zack Sabre Jr.), who held the title for 630 days, while the shortest reign belongs to The Inner City Machine Guns (Rich Swann and Ricochet), who held the title for 1 day.

The current champions are FTR (Dax Harwood and Cash Wheeler), who are in their first reign as a team and individually. They won the title by defeating Cowboy Way (Thomas Shire and 1 Called Manders), at RevPro 14 Year Anniversary Show in London, on August 29, 2026.

=== Reigns ===
Key
No.	Overall reign number
Reign	Reign number for the specific team—reign numbers for the individuals are in parentheses, if different
Days	Number of days held
+	Current reign is changing daily

No.	Champion	Championship change			Reign statistics		Notes	Ref.
No.	Champion	Date	Event	Location	Reign	Days	Notes	Ref.
IPW:UK
1	AK-47 (Ashe and Kris Linell)	17 July 2005	Weekend of Champions: Night II	Orpington, Kent, England	1	216	Defeated The Chav Army (Battalion and Flaming Red) in the tournament final to become inaugural champions.	
2	The Untouchables (Dave Moralez and Jack Storm)	18 February 2006	A Taste of IPW	Orpington, Kent, England	1	218		
3	Dragon Hearts (Dragon Phoenix and Spud)	24 September 2006	2nd Anniversary Weekend: Night II	Orpington, Kent, England	1	77	This was a Tables, Ladders, and Chairs match.	
4	$wiss Money Holding (Ares and Claudio Castagnoli)	10 December 2006	The Dome Show	Colchester, Essex, England	1	287	Defeated Luke Phoenix (aka Dragon Phoenix) and Bubblegum, who substituted for Spud.	
5	The Kartel (Sha Samuels and Terry Frazier)	23 September 2007	3rd Anniversary Weekend: Night II	Orpington, Kent, England	1	371		
6	The Thrillers (Doug Basham, Iestyn Rees, Joel Redman, Mark Haskins and Ricky Hype)	28 September 2008	Fourth Anniversary Tour - Wolves	Wolverhampton, West Midlands, England	1	217	Defended the title under the Freebird Rule.	
7	The Leaders of the New School (Marty Scurll and Zack Sabre Jr.)	3 May 2009	The Sittingbourne Spectacular	Sittingbourne, Kent, England	1	495	Defeated Joel Redman and Mark Haskins, who represented The Thrillers.	
8	The All Stars (Mikey Whiplash and Robbie Dynamite)	10 September 2010	Dragon Gate Yokosuka vs. SHINGO 2	Hoddesdon, Hertfordshire, England	1	86	This was a Dark match	
9	The Leaders of the New School (Marty Scurll and Zack Sabre Jr.)	5 December 2010	Brawl At The Hall	Sittingbourne, Kent, England	2	630	Defeated ¡Peligro Abejas! (El Generico and Paul London) in the finals of a three-team round-robin tournament, also involving The All Stars.	
10	Project Ego (Kris Travis and Martin Kirby)	26 August 2012	Summer Sizzler	Sittingbourne, Kent, England	1	293		
RevPro
11	The Swords of Essex (Paul Robinson and Will Ospreay)	15 June 2013	When Thunder Strikes	Bethnal Green, Greater London, England	1	273		
12	The Inner City Machine Guns (Rich Swann and Ricochet)	15 March 2014	High Stakes	Bethnal Green, Greater London, England	1	1		
13	The Kartel (Sha Samuels and Terry Frazier)	16 March 2014	Sittingbourne Spectacular	Sittingbourne, Kent, England	2	91		
14	England's Calling (Joel Redman (2) and Martin Stone)	15 June 2014	Summer Sizzler	Bethnal Green, Greater London, England	1	245		
15	The Thrillers (Joel Redman (3) and Mark Haskins (2)	15 February 2015	High Stakes	Bethnal Green, Greater London, England	2	119	Mark Haskins replaced Martin Stone as Joel Redman's tag team partner.	
16	The Revolutionists (James Castle and Sha Samuels (3))	14 June 2015	Summer Sizzler	Bethnal Green, Greater London, England	1	364	Defeated Joel Redman and Jake McCluskey, who substituted for Mark Haskins.	
17	Charlie Garrett and Joel Redman (4)	12 June 2016	Angle vs. Sabre Jr.	Bethnal Green, Greater London, England	1	266		
18	CCK (Chris Brookes and Travis Banks)	5 March 2017	Live At The Cockpit	Marylebone, London, England	1	232		
19	Moustache Mountain (Trent Seven and Tyler Bate)	23 October 2017	Monday Night Mayhem	Portsmouth, Hampshire, England	1	89		
20	Suzuki-gun (Minoru Suzuki and Zack Sabre Jr. (3))	20 January 2018	High Stakes	Bethnal Green, Greater London, England	1	475		
21	Aussie Open (Kyle Fletcher and Mark Davis)	10 May 2019	Epic Encounter	Bethnal Green, Greater London, England	1	50		
22	Josh Bodom and Sha Samuels (4)	29 June 2019	Ungovernable	Manchester, England	1	71	This was a four-way match, also involving Los Ingobernables de Japón (Bushi & Evil) and Team WhiteWolf (A-Kid & Carlos Romo).	
—	Vacated	September 8, 2019	—	—	—	—	Stripped of the championships after Bodom was fired by RevPro following a shoot attack on referee Aaren Wilde on August 30, 2019.	
23	The Legion (Great-O-Kharn and Rampage Brown)	13 October 2019	Live In Southampton	Southampton, England	1	560	Defeated Dan Magee and Kurtis Chapman for the vacant titles. On 24 November 2019, edition of British J Cup, Legion defeated Moonlight Express (Mao and Mike Bailey) to unify the titles with SWE Tag Team Championship.	
—	Vacated	25 April 2021	—	—	—	—	Vacated when Rampage Brown signed with WWE and Great-O-Kharn returned to Japan.	
24	Destination Everywhere (Michael Oku and Connor Mills)	21 August 2021	IX Anniversary	Manchester, England	1	29	Defeated The Legion (Lucian Phillips and Screwface Ahmed) in the finals of Great British Tag League to win the vacant titles.	
25	Aussie Open (Kyle Fletcher and Mark Davis)	19 September 2021	High Stakes	Manchester, England	2	63	This was a winner takes all match, where Aussie Open's PWA Tag Team Championship was also in the line.	
26	Ricky Knight Jr. and Roy Knight	21 November 2021	Uprising	London, England	1	49		
27	Sunshine Machine (Chuck Mambo and TK Cooper)	9 January 2022	Live In London	London, England	1	287	Defeated Ricky Knight Jr. and Zak Knight, who substituted for Roy Knight.	
28	Greedy Souls (Brendan White and Danny Jones)	23 October 2022	Live In London	London, England	1	259		
29	Subculture (Flash Morgan Webster and Mark Andrews)	9 July 2023	Epic Encounter 2023	London, England	1	266		
30	Grizzled Young Veterans (James Drake and Zack Gibson)	31 March 2024	Revolution Rumble	London, England	1	146		
31	Sunshine Machine (Chuck Mambo and TK Cooper)	24 August 2024	RevPro 12th Anniversary Show	London, England	2	119		
32	Jay Joshua and Connor Mills (2)	21 December 2024	Uprising	London, England	1	85		
33	Young Guns (Ethan Allen and Luke Jacobs)	16 March 2025	Epic Encounter	Wolverhampton, England	1	427		
34	Slater Dojo (Leon Slater and Liam Slater)	17 May 2026	Revolution Rumble	Doncaster, England	1	55		
35	Cowboy Way (Thomas Shire and 1 Called Manders)	12 July 2026	Live in Sheffield 26	Sheffield, England	1	48		
36	FTR (Dax Harwood and Cash Wheeler)	29 August 2026	RevPro 14 Year Anniversary Show	London, England	1	77+		

== Combined reigns ==
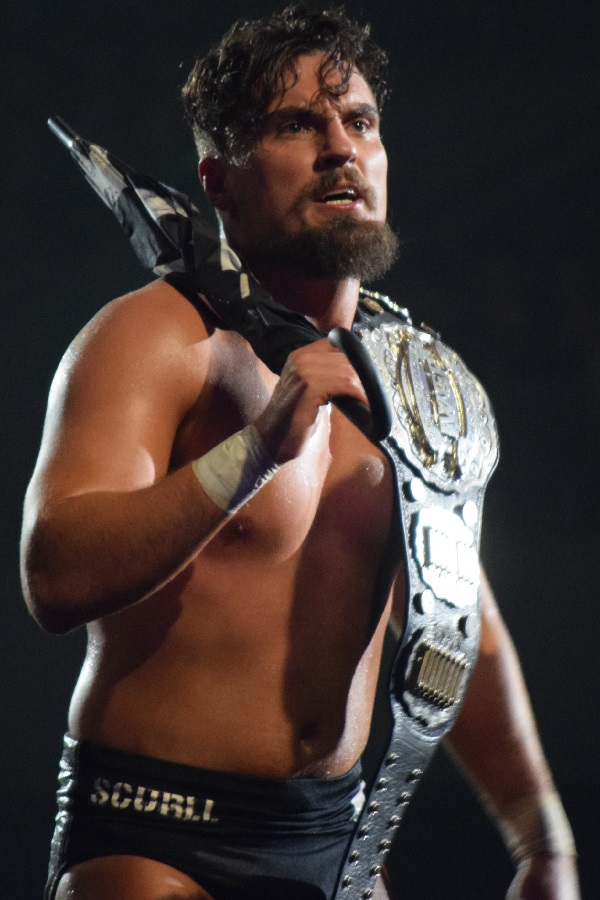
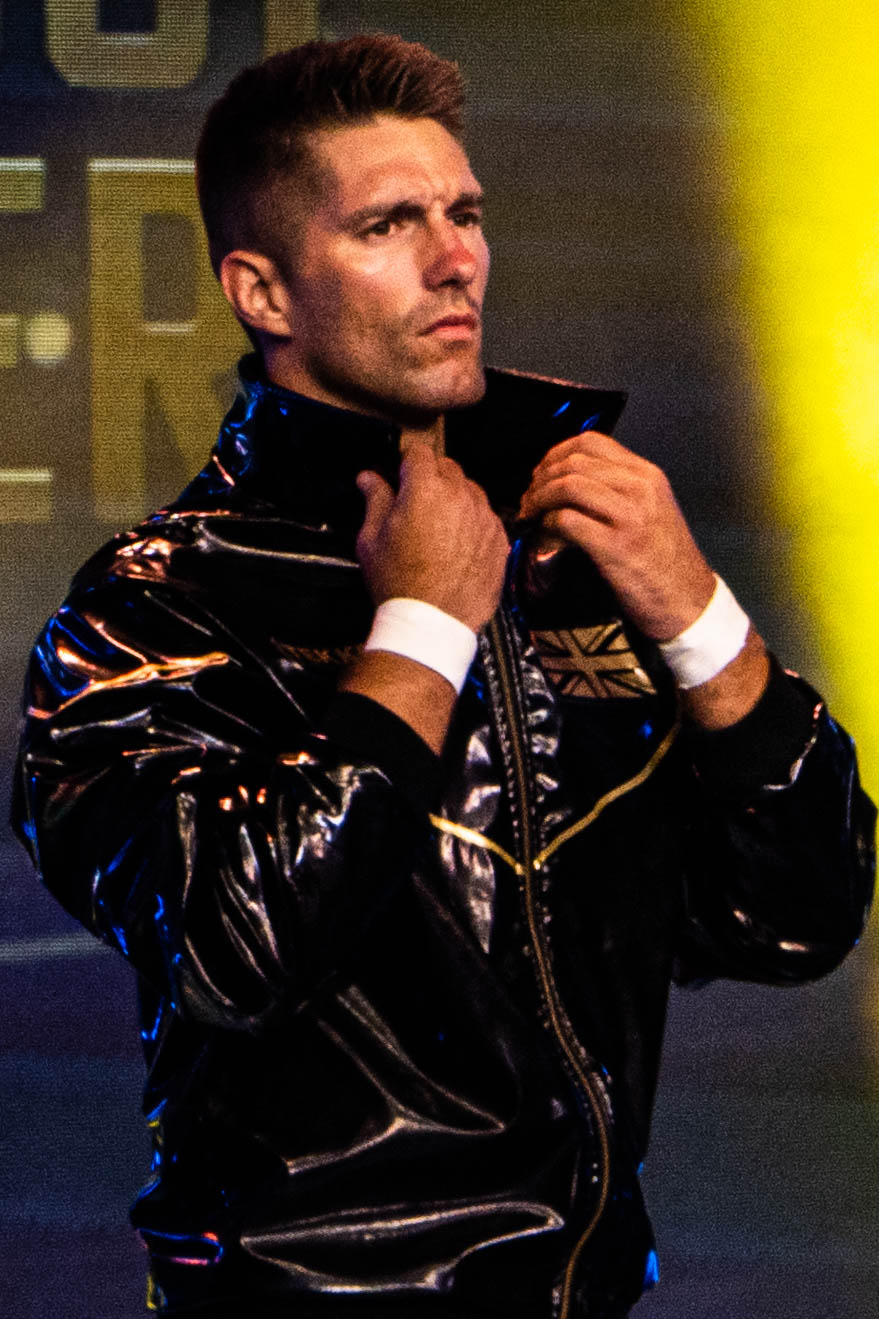
Record tying two-time and longest reigning champions The Leaders of the New School (Marty Scurll and Zack Sabre Jr.)

As of November 14, 2026.

†	Indicates the current champion

=== By team ===
Rank	Team	No. of reigns	Combined days
1	The Leaders of the New School (Marty Scurll and Zack Sabre Jr.)	2	1,125
2	The Legion (Great-O-Khan and Rampage Brown)	1	560
3	Suzuki-gun (Minoru Suzuki and Zack Sabre Jr.)	1	475
4	The Kartel (Sha Samuels and Terry Frazier)	2	462
5	Young Guns (Ethan Allen and Luke Jacobs)	1	427
6	Sunshine Machine (Chuck Mambo and TK Cooper)	2	406
7	The Revolutionists (James Castle and Sha Samuels)	1	364
8	The Thrillers (1st reign: Doug Basham, Iestyn Rees, Joel Redman, Mark Haskins and Ricky Hype) (2nd reign: Redman and Haskins)	2	336
9	Project Ego (Kris Travis and Martin Kirby)	1	293
10	$wiss Money Holding (Ares and Claudio Castagnoli)	1	287
11	The Swords of Essex (Paul Robinson and Will Ospreay)	1	273
12	Charlie Garrett and Joel Redman	1	266
12	Subculture (Flash Morgan Webster and Mark Andrews)	1	266
14	Greedy Souls (Brendan White and Danny Jones)	1	259
15	England's Calling (Joel Redman and Martin Stone)	1	245
16	CCK (Chris Brookes and Travis Banks)	1	232
17	The Untouchables (Dave Moralez and Jack Storm)	1	218
18	AK-47 (Ashe and Kris Linell)	1	216
19	Grizzled Young Veterans (James Drake and Zack Gibson)	1	146
20	Aussie Open (Kyle Fletcher and Mark Davis)	2	113
21	Moustache Mountain (Trent Seven and Tyler Bate)	1	89
22	The All Stars (Mikey Whiplash and Robbie Dynamite)	1	86
23	Jay Joshua and Connor Mills	1	85
24	FTR † (Dax Harwood and Cash Wheeler)	1	77+
25	Dragon Hearts (Dragon Phoenix and Spud)	1	77
26	Josh Bodom and Sha Samuels	1	71
27	Slater Dojo (Leon Slater and Liam Slater)	1	55
28	Ricky Knight Jr. and Roy Knight	1	49
29	Cowboy Way (Thomas Shire and 1 Called Manders)	1	48
30	Destination Everywhere (Michael Oku and Connor Mills)	1	29
31	The Inner City Machine Guns (Rich Swann and Ricochet)	1	1

=== By wrestler ===
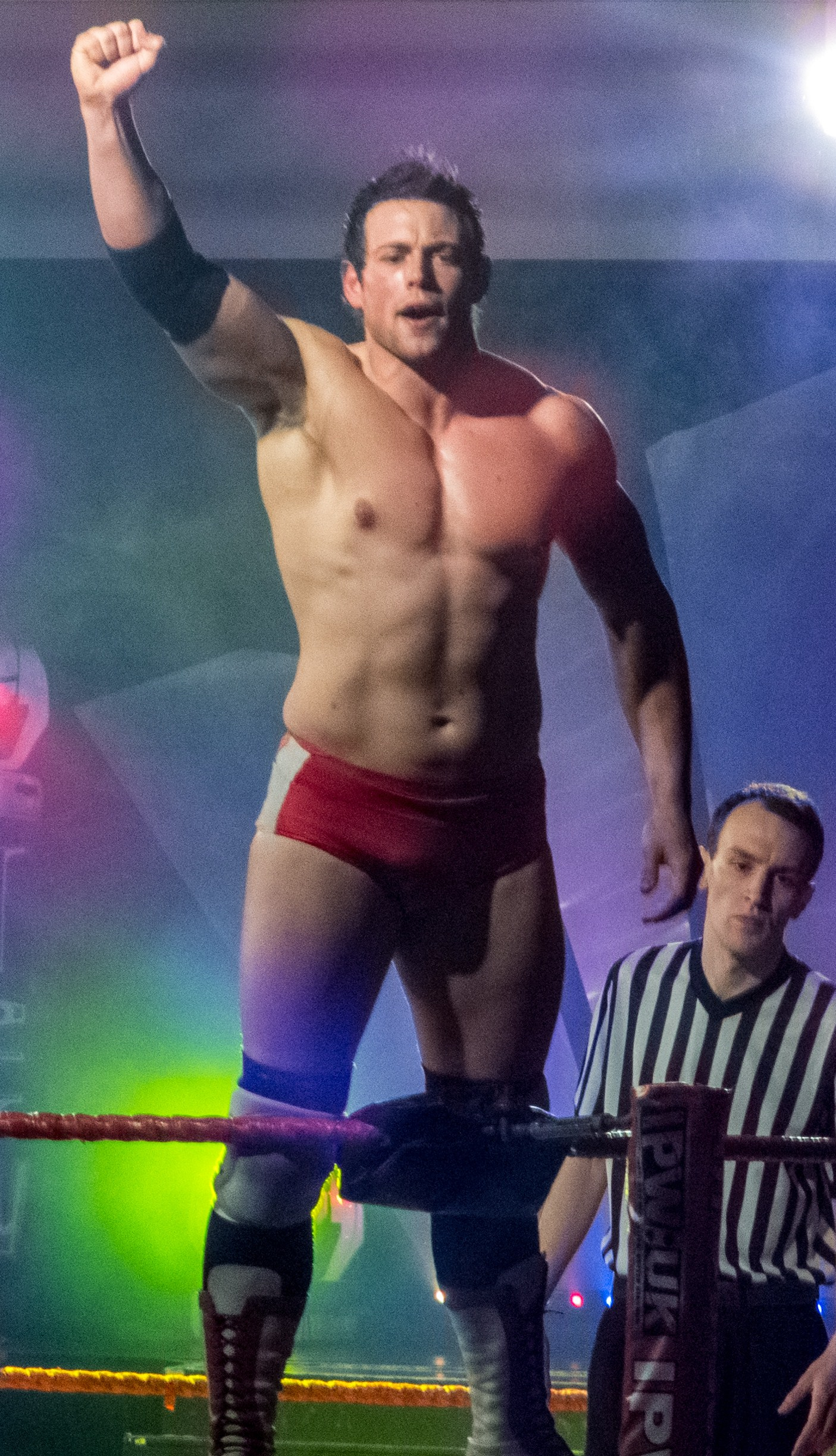
Record tying four-time champion (with Sha Samuels) Joel Redman.

Rank	Wrestler	No. of reigns	Combined days
1	Zack Sabre Jr.	3	1,600
2	Marty Scurll	2	1,125
3	Sha Samuels	4	897
4	Joel Redman	4	847
5	Great-O-Khan	1	560
5	Rampage Brown	1	560
7	Minoru Suzuki	1	475
8	Terry Frazier	2	462
9	Ethan Allen	1	427
9	Luke Jacobs	1	427
11	Chuck Mambo	2	406
11	TK Cooper	2	406
13	James Castle	1	364
14	Mark Haskins	2	336
15	Kris Travis	1	293
15	Martin Kirby	1	293
17	Ares	1	287
17	Claudio Castagnoli	1	287
19	Paul Robinson	1	273
19	Will Ospreay	1	273
21	Charlie Garrett	1	266
21	Flash Morgan Webster	1	266
21	Mark Andrews	1	266
24	Brendan White	1	259
24	Danny Jones	1	259
26	Martin Stone	1	245
27	Chris Brookes	1	232
27	Travis Banks	1	232
29	Dave Moralez	1	218
29	Jack Storm	1	218
31	Doug Basham	1	217
31	Iestyn Rees	1	217
31	Ricky Hype	1	217
34	Ashe	1	216
34	Kris Linell	1	216
36	James Drake	1	146
36	Zack Gibson	1	146
38	Connor Mills	2	114
39	Kyle Fletcher	2	113
39	Mark Davis	2	113
41	Trent Seven	1	89
41	Tyler Bate	1	89
43	Mikey Whiplash	1	86
43	Robbie Dynamite	1	86
45	Jay Joshua	1	85
46	Dax Harwood †	1	77+
46	Cash Wheeler †	1	77+
48	Dragon Phoenix	1	77
48	Spud	1	77
50	Josh Bodom	1	71
51	Leon Slater	1	55
51	Liam Slater	1	55
53	Ricky Knight Jr.	1	49
53	Roy Knight	1	49
55	Thomas Shire	1	48
55	1 Called Manders	1	48
57	Michael Oku	1	29
58	Rich Swann	1	1
58	Ricochet	1	1

== See also ==
- Professional wrestling in the United Kingdom
- British Heavyweight Championship
- British Cruiserweight Championship
