= British Power International =

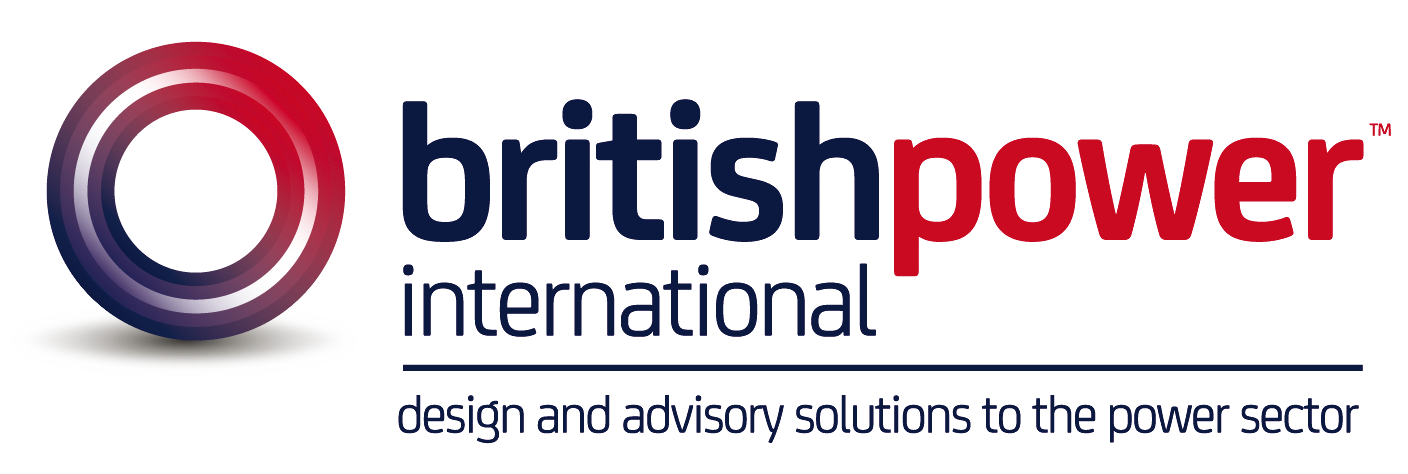
- Industry: Electrical Engineering Consultancy
- Predecessor: British Electricity International (BEI)
- Headquarters: Colchester Essex, UK
- Number of locations: 3 Offices at 08-2010
- Area served: International
- Key people: Azad Panwar (GM)
- Parent: EnServe Group

British Power International (BPI) provides design and advisory solutions to the power sector and is based in Colchester, Essex. BPI is part of the Freedom Group, who has recently been acquired by NG Bailey.

The company's design practice focuses on power system planning, design, asset management and provides associated project management, safety and quality assurance services. Its consulting practice provides advice on the technical, financial, safety and environmental aspects of power generation, transmission, distribution and supply in a range of regulatory frameworks and market conditions. Based in the UK it operates worldwide.

== Customers ==
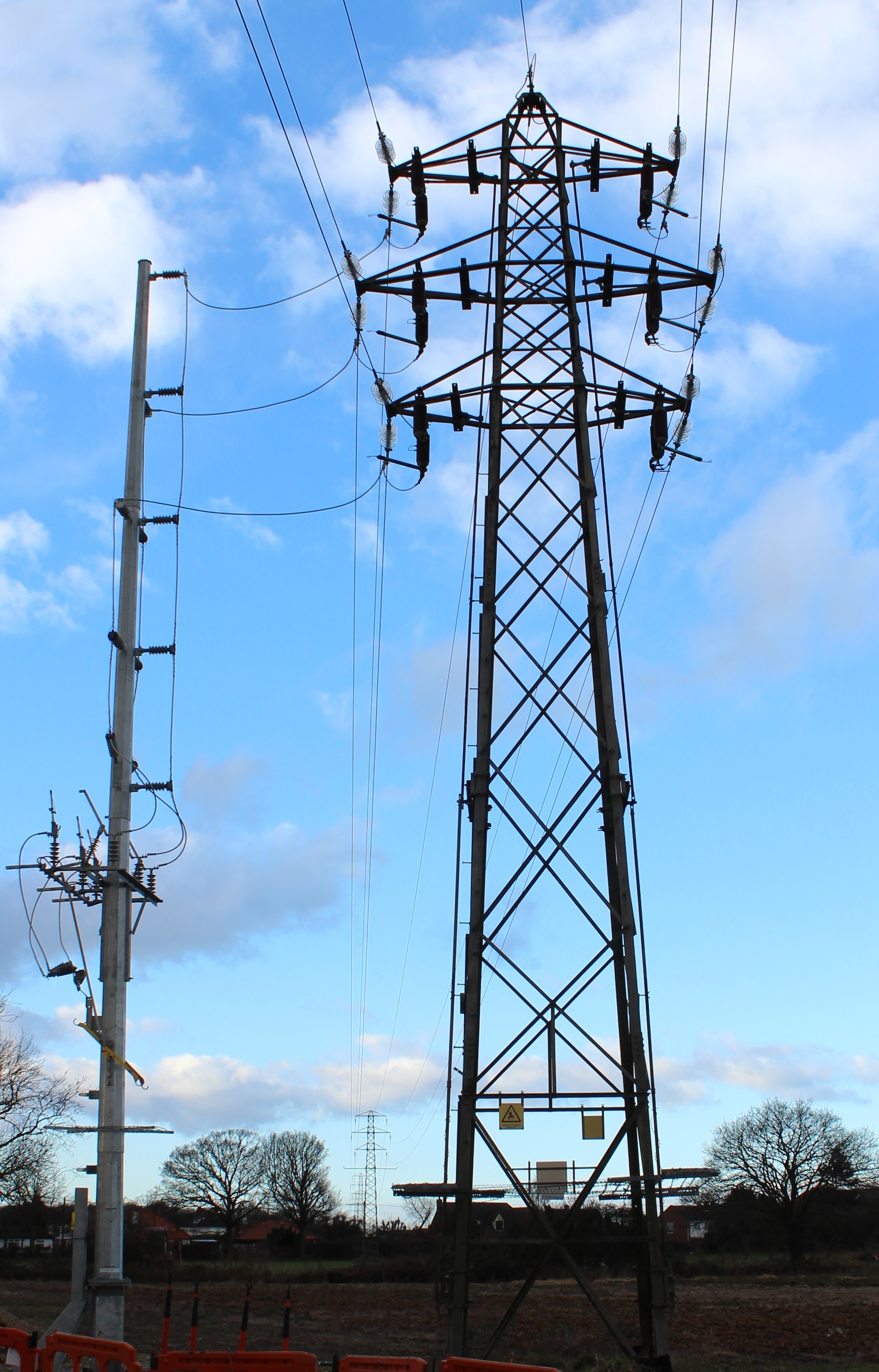
A BPI Point of Connection (POC) mast (left) connected to one circuit of a tension tower (right)

The company has a broad customer base. BPI has worked for the UK Government and UK Regulatory Authority (Ofgem) as an adviser and auditor of electricity companies’ performance. It provides design services to electricity network operators in the UK. Internationally it works for NGOs, including the Asian Development bank, as well as Governments, Regulatory Authorities and actual and potential investors in the power sector.

== Community ==
The company has recognised the shortage of qualified engineers in the UK and has taken initiatives to encourage students to take an interest in the electricity sector. BPI has supported the work of both Colchester Institute in setting up a course specifically aimed at preparing students for a career in the power sector, and the Masters Programme at the University of Newcastle.

== History ==
Formed in 1979 as British Electricity International, it was the international arm of the UK's electricity supply industry, exporting technical and commercial expertise worldwide. Following the privatisation of the electricity industry, ownership passed later on, to a successor company, National Power at that time; from 1996 (renamed as British Power International) it became part of Eastern Group, one of the UK's leading power companies.

In 1999 it became an independent consultancy practice (British Power International Limited).

In 2008 Spice plc acquired British Power International ltd. In September 2011 Spice Limited rebranded as EnServe Group.
