= EnServe =

British utility infrastructure services company

EnServe Group Limited
- Company type: Limited company
- Industry: Support services
- Founded: 1996
- Headquarters: Macclesfield, Cheshire, United Kingdom
- Key people: Mark Perkins 2015 to exit (CEO)
- Revenue: £312.2 million (2008)
- Operating income: £24.6 million (2008)
- Net income: £13.7 million (2008)
- Parent: Rubicon
- Subsidiaries: Subsidiaries: Freedom Group; British Power International; Evolve Analytics; Metro Rod; Meter-U; H2O Water Services
- Website: www.enservegroup.com

EnServe Group Limited (formerly Spice Limited) is a support services company headquartered in Macclesfield, United Kingdom which provides infrastructure services to the utility sector.

Formerly listed on the London Stock Exchange and a constituent of the FTSE 250 Index, it was wholly owned by the private equity company Cinven between 2010 and 2016, when it was bought by Rubicon and Grovepoint.

== History ==
The company was founded by Simon Rigby in 1996 as a management buy out from Yorkshire Electricity initially trading as Freedom Maintenance. It was first listed on the Alternative Investment Market in 2004. In 2006 it bought Inenco and ParGas and Apollo Heating, in 2007 it purchased Gas Heating UK and in 2008 it acquired Saturn Energy, Energy 2000, British Power International and the National Industrial Fuel Efficiency Service.

The Company transferred to the main list of the London Stock Exchange in 2008. Spice plc was unlisted in December 2010 after a buyout by European investment group Cinven and renamed as Spice ltd. In September 2011 Spice Limited was renamed EnServe Group Limited.

Rubicon and Grovepoint purchased Enserve Group from Cinven in January 2016.

== Operations ==
The company has the following divisions:

- Electricity
- Water
- Analytics
