= The Kartel =

Professional wrestling tag team

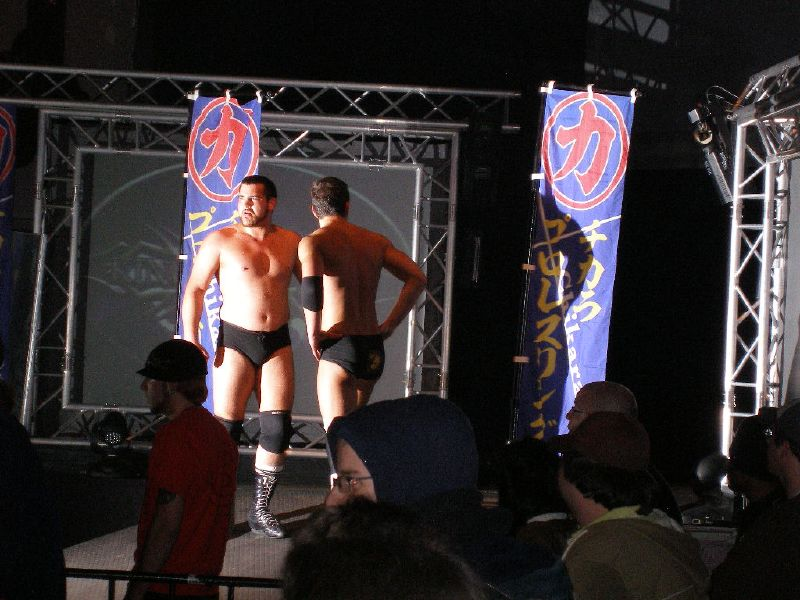

Tag team
- Members: Terry Frazier; Sha Samuels
- Name: The Kartel
- Billed heights: 6 ft 2 in (1.88 m) - Frazier; 5 ft 11 in (1.80 m) - Samuels
- Combined billed weight: 415 lb (188 kg)
- Billed from: London, United Kingdom
- Debut: 2002
- Trained by: Dropkixx; Dino Scarlo; Mel Stuart - Samuels; Alex Shane - Frazier; Tony Scarlo - Frazier

The Kartel was a professional wrestling tag team made up of Terry Frazier and Sha Samuels. They are best known their work on the independent circuit mainly within the United Kingdom.

== Professional wrestling career ==
Frazier, and Samuels, The East End Mauler, both hail from east London and would begin training at the Dropkixx academy sometime at the beginning of the 21st century; training with various teachers under the watchful eye of Dino Scarlo.

Frazier, at the age of 14 and using the name Scott Frazier, faced Matt Stevens in his first professional match while Samuels faced Kristian Linnell around the same time. It wasn't long before both men were brought together to become the (often heel) tag team known as The Kartel.

The self professed "Winners" gained a measure of success, winning titles in various smaller promotions while also competing in more high profile UK independents; including SAS Wrestling, and International Pro Wrestling: United Kingdom. The Kartel would also tour Italy with the Italian Championship Wrestling promotion.

In 2003, at the age of 16, Frazier was considered one of the youngest UK pro wrestlers yet he still managed to gain the opportunity to go to Atlanta, Georgia in the United States to train with William Regal, Chris Benoit and Dave Taylor of WWE fame.

While Samuels improved on his stiff style of wrestling, the smaller built Frazier began using sport supplements to gain muscle mass so that he could become more eligible for tours Stateside and in Japan.

In 2007 both Samuels and Frazier embarked on a training excursion to South East Asia to both gain knowledge of eastern training methods, and to improve upon fitness and strength.

The Kartel became IPW:UK Tag Team Champions for the first time when they defeated $wiss Money Holding on 23 September 2007 in Orpington, Kent. Later, they unified IPW:UK Tag Team titles with RQW British Tag Team Championships to become Unified British Tag Team champions.

In February 2008, the Kartel competed Chikara's King of Trios tournament in Philadelphia, United States, teaming with Martin Stone as Team IPW:UK, but were defeated in the second round of the tournament by the Golden Trio (Delirious, Hallowicked and Helios).

The Kartel stopped working as an active tag team in IPW:UK during the summer of 2010 after Samuels turned on Frazier during an in-ring angle at the "Sittingbourne Spectacular". Samuels continues to wrestle around Europe as a singles star, whilst Frazier is less active, making the odd appearance here and there.

Frazier later became an actor under the name Terry Dormer.

== Championships and accomplishments ==
- Catch Wrestling Council

- CWC Tag Team Championship (1 time)

- Extreme World Warfare

- EWF Tag Team Championship (1 time)

- International Pro Wrestling: United Kingdom / Real Quality Wrestling

- British Tag Team Championship (1 time)

- Revolution Pro Wrestling
  - RPW Undisputed British Tag Team Championship (2 times)
- Rock and Metal Wrestling Action

- RAMWA Tag Team Championship (2 times)

- Westside Xtreme Wrestling

- wXw Tag Team Championship (1 time)
