= Preston Guild Hall =

Entertainment venue in Preston, Lancashire, England

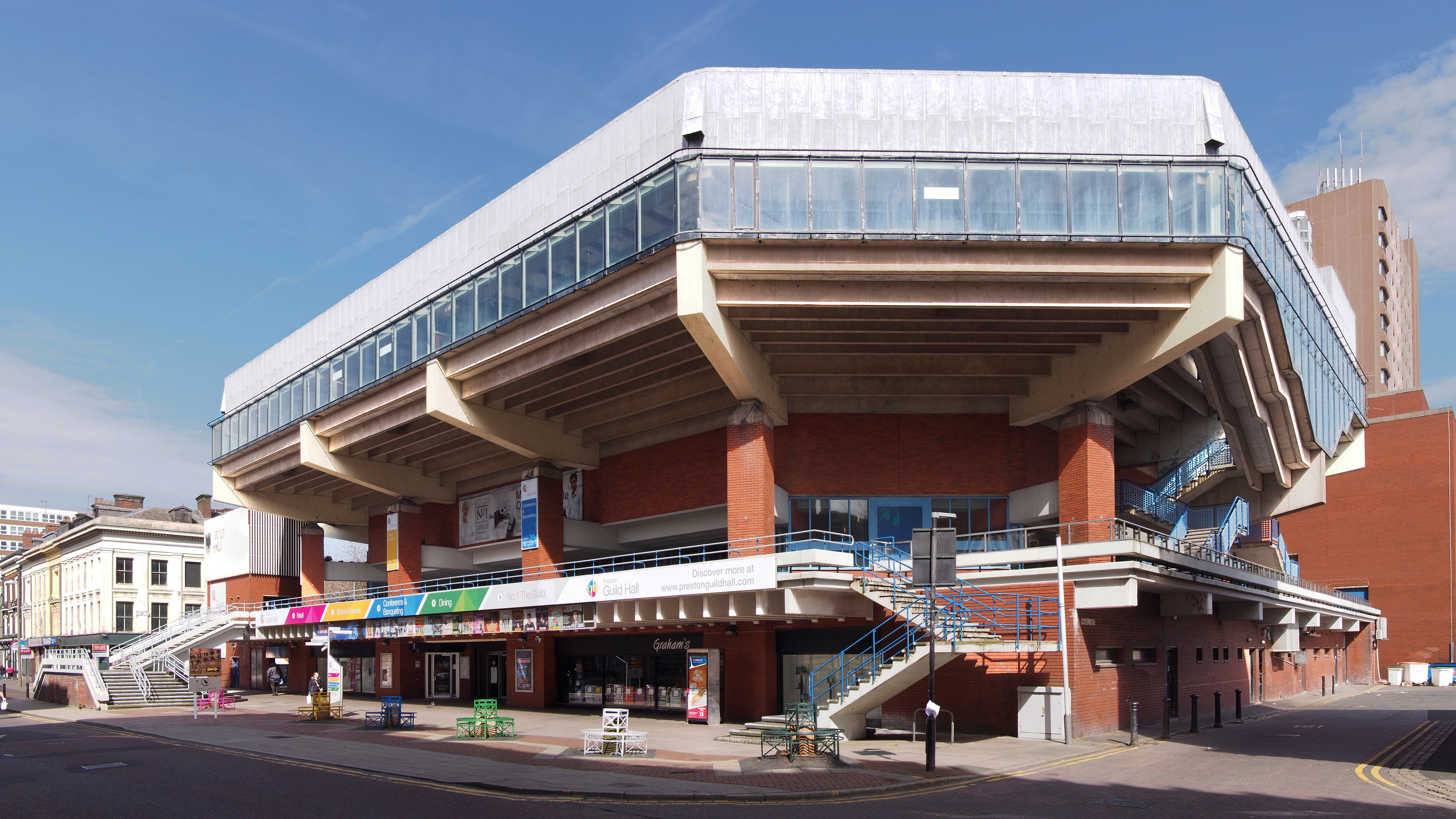
- Pictured in April 2015

- Location in Preston city centre
- Full name: Preston Guild Hall and Charter Theatre
- Location: Preston, Lancashire
- Coordinates: 53°45′35″N 2°41′51″W
- Owner: Preston City Council
- Operator: Preston Guild Hall Ltd
- Capacity: 2,034 (Grand Hall); 780 (Charter Theatre); 350 (Foyer)
- Type: Concert venue (Grand Hall); Theatre (Charter Theatre)
- Acreage: 1,087 m^{2} (Grand Hall); 336 m^{2} (Charter Theatre); 529 m^{2} (Foyer)
- Public transit: Preston bus station

Construction
- Opened: 1973; 53 years ago

Preston Guild Hall is an entertainment venue in Preston, Lancashire, England, which opened in 1973.

== History ==
The Guild Hall was commissioned to replace the town's Public Hall. The new building, which was designed by Robert Matthew, Johnson Marshall, was due to be ready for the Preston Guild of 1972, but after construction was delayed, it only officially opened in 1973.

The complex has two performance venues, the Grand Hall which holds 2,034 people and the Charter Theatre which holds 780 people. There is direct pedestrian access, via footbridge, from the adjacent Preston bus station and car park.

Artists that have performed at the venue include Royal Liverpool Philharmonic Orchestra, Libor Pešek and Vasily Petrenko. Led Zeppelin and David Bowie both performed at the venue in 1973 and The Smiths in 1986 among others. Bing Crosby gave one of his last concerts at the Guild Hall in September 1977, less than a month before his death. It also hosted the UK Snooker Championship for the years 1978 to 1997.

In 2013, Preston City Council considered demolishing the venue due to high running costs, but instead sold it in 2014 to local businessman Simon Rigby for an undisclosed sum, later revealed to be £1. In return Rigby promised to spend £1m in renovations. Ongoing financial problems saw Rigby close the venue in May 2019 and he was forced to place the business into administration. Preston City Council, one of the company's creditors, subsequently reclaimed possession of the building, citing "significant breaches" in the lease agreement and the "unacceptable behaviour" of Rigby's attempt to transfer ownership to a charity of which he was a trustee.

The building was due to host the Business Expo in April 2020 but this event had to be cancelled due to the COVID-19 pandemic. The Guild Hall was set to reopen in November 2023 but this was delayed until March 2024 due to concerns over the use of aerated concrete on the site.
