= Adam Maxted =

Northern Irish professional wrestler

Personal information
- Born: 27 March 1992 (age 34) Belfast, Northern Ireland

Professional wrestling career
- Ring name: Adam Maxted
- Billed height: 6 ft 3 in (1.91 m)
- Billed weight: 235 lb (107 kg)
- Billed from: Belfast, Northern Ireland
- Debut: 20 June 2015

Adam Maxted (born 27 March 1992) is a Northern Irish professional wrestler and former contestant on ITV2 show Love Island. Having been a contestant on Series two of Love Island, having entered at day 11, Maxted paired up with Katie Salmon and finished the series in fourth position.

== Love Island ==
In 2016, Maxted was selected to be a part of the second series of ITV's Love Island; where he appeared from the 11th day, until the end, selecting fellow contestant Katie Salmon as his date. The pair ended the series in fourth place, behind eventual winners, Nathan and Cara. In 2024, Maxted was selected to be a part of ITV's Love Island: All Stars, entering on the 26th day. He was dumped on the 35th day along with his partner, Arabella Chi, after a vote from the previously dumped Islanders.

== Professional wrestling career ==
=== Early career (2015–2017) ===
Maxted left Love Island and continued his wrestling training, eventually earning his debut match in August 2016, at Southside Wrestling, being defeated by Joseph Connors. Maxted later had matches for Preston City Wrestling, British Championship Wrestling, Over the Top Wrestling, and 4 Front Wrestling, in 2017. In May 2017, Maxted was called up to have his first WWE Tryout, in the O2 Arena.

Maxted had his first championship matches, competing for the All-Ulster Title and challenging Josh Knott for the Pro Wrestling Pride Catch Division Championship. He then made trips to France, and Pakistan, where he challenged for the PWE World Heavyweight Title. In November 2017, Maxted won the IPW:UK All England Championship, defeating Earl-Black Junior.

In 2018, after signing for 5 Star Wrestling, he appeared on FreeSports, where he and Charlie Sterling won the 5* Tag Team Championship.

=== World of Sport (2018) ===
On 4 August 2018, he made his debut for World of Sport, teaming up with Nathan Cruz to take on Doug Williams and HT Drake in the WOS Tag Team Title Tournament. Maxted and Cruz went on to defeat the team of Grado and Davey Boy Smith Jr. to advance to the finals, however they were unsuccessful to become the 1st Tag Team Champions, losing the final to Kip Sabian and Lestyn Rees. Nathan Cruz then betrayed Maxted shortly after. On 24 August, episode 5, Maxted defeated Cruz in a Ladder Match, which who ever loses must leave WOS forever.

=== Over The Top Wrestling (since 2016) ===
Adam Maxted debuted for Irish promotion Over The Top Wrestling in 2016. He is the current co-holder of the OTT Tag Team Championship. Maxted also holds the record for longest reigning OTT Gender Neutral with his tenure lasting 560 days.

=== Insane Championship Wrestling ===
Adam Maxted debuted for Glasgow's Insane Championship Wrestling promotion on 29 September 2018, losing to Lionheart on ICW: Fight Club. He joined The Kings of the North with Bonesaw and Damian Corvin to enter the King of Hawners tournament but were eliminated in the semi-finals by The Wild Boys (Andy Wild, Aaron Echo and Kieran Kelly). The trio took another loss at ICW: Fear & Loathing XII in a match with Noam Dar, Sha Samuels and Jack Jester.

Maxted challenged Kez Evans for the ICW Zero-G Championship but was again defeated. His last appearance to date was a tag team victory with Luke Kyro over KOE (Kai Williams King and King Killa) at ICW: Fear & Loathing XIII on 21 November 2021.

== Personal life ==
Following Love Island, Maxted entered into a relationship with fitness instructor Carly Taylor.

== Championships and accomplishments ==
- 5 Star Wrestling
  - 5 Star Wrestling: Tag Team Championship (1 time, inaugural, final) - with Charlie Sterling
  - 5 Star Wrestling: Tag Team Championship Championship Tournament (2018) - with Charlie Sterling
- Big League Wrestling/ Ultimate Pro Wrestling
  - UPW Heavyweight Championship (2 time)
  - BLW/ UPW World Heavyweight Championship (3 time)
  - BLW Tag Team Championship (1 time) - with Chris Andrews
- Frontline Wrestling
  - Frontline Heavyweight Championship (1 time)
- International Pro Wrestling United Kingdom
  - All England Championship (1 time)
- Ironfist Wrestling
  - Ironfist Heavyweight Championship (1 time)
  - King Of The Ironfist Tournament (2019)
- Main Event Wrestling
  - MEW Heavyweight Championship (3 times)
- New Breed Wrestling Association
  - NBWA Heavyweight Championship (1 time)
- Over the Top Wrestling
  - OTT Gender Neutral Championship (1 time)
  - OTT Tag Team Championship (1 time) - with Charlie Sterling
- Southside Wrestling Entertainment
  - SWE European Championship (1 time)
