= Chris Andrews (wrestler) =

British independent wrestler (born 1984)

Personal information
- Born: 12 October 1984 (age 41) Crediton, England

Professional wrestling career
- Ring name: Chris Andrews
- Billed height: 6 ft 0 in (183 cm)
- Billed weight: 220 lb (100 kg)
- Trained by: VPW School of Excellence
- Debut: 2005

Chris Andrews (born 12 October 1984) is a British independent professional wrestler, from Crediton, Devon currently active in the United Kingdom. Andrews started his in-ring career in 2005, training at the Varsity Pro Wrestling School of Excellence. Andrews sometimes tag teamed with his brother Sam Andrews as the "Andrews Brothers."

As of January 2018, Andrews is a seven-time heavyweight champion, including winning the PWP Heavyweight Championship on two occasions, and a two time DWA tag team champion as part of the "Andrews Brothers".

== Career ==
=== Varsity Pro Wrestling (2005–08) ===
Starting out in the Varsity Pro Wrestling (VPW) school, run by the UK Kid, Andrews later wrestled Kid for Revolution British Wrestling, and Premier Promotions in losing efforts. However, Andrews made an appearance at the VPW debut show on 16 September 2005 in Horndean, Hampshire, Andrews took on and defeated "Bulldozer", picking up his first professional victory. After that match a jealous Kris Kay attacked Andrews who had to be helped to the backstage area by ring staff.

Later on in the same night Andrews got a measure of revenge by costing Kay a match to Andy Simmonz, afterwards an irate Kris Kay challenge Andrews to a match at the next show, Andrews accepted. On 28 October 2005 Andrews took on Kay, where Andrews lost after a chair shot. Andrews and Kay fought again a month later on 25 November 2005 and this time it was Andrews who managed to pick up the win over rival Kris Kay in a feud ending bout. Andrews wrestled in Crediton on 26 January 2006 where he lost a singles match to trainer The UK Kid only to later pick up a victory over The UK Kid and Spiro, where he teamed for the first time with his brother. Andrews faced Billy Gunn on 17 February 2006 in James' first UK independent match, only to be defeated due to an inadvertent distraction from Phil Powers.

Andrews moved into 2007 and gained victories over Joel Redman, as well as started working for All Star Wrestling. Andrews won his first professional title, winning a battle royale to win the vacant VPW Championship in Bridgwater, Somerset. He, however, lost the title later that night back to the UK Kid. Andrews moved into 2008, with wins over Andy Symmondz, Matt Bourne, and Sam Andrews, before losing twice to his brother.

=== Wrestling.IE (2009–2010) ===
Moving into 2009, Andrews started to work for the Wrestling.IE brand, (also known as Sports Entertainment Wrestling), in Northern Ireland. He took part in the company's King of the ring tournament, reaching the semi-finals, which was won by fellow Devonian, Joel Redman. The two formed a team of five, known as the 'Risktakers' and were undefeated in five 10-man tag team matches for the company.

=== Devon Wrestling (2010–12) ===
In 2010, Andrews began to wrestle for Joel Redman's startup company the Devon Wrestling Alliance, from his home county of Devon. Andrews won his first two matches in the company and won the DWA Tag Team championships with his brother, with a win over Danny and Mark Walsh. They later lost the titles in May, following a loss to Gilligan Gordon and Marcus Baine. He was a part of Joel Redman's last UK date before joining the WWE, defeating Redman, and Riley in a tag match with partner Sam Andrews for Pro Wrestling Pride.

=== Multiple Championship Reigns (2012–13) ===
Later, in 2012, The Andrew's brothers once again won the tag team titles and defended them in a ladder match against Danny and Mark Walsh. Andrews also defeated Nick Riley in a mountevans rules match, 2–1 to win the DWA Trophy, on 15 September 2012. In November, Andrews made a surprise return to Varsity Pro Wrestling, defeating champion The UK Kid, in his return match. Andrews ended the year as a triple heavyweight champion, winning the Pro Evolution championship in November.

At the beginning of 2013, Andrews went undefeated until June. Andrews defended the EVW Championship against Dave Mastiff and Joey Sniper, before becoming the first PWP Heavyweight Champion, defeating Mike Hitchman, PJ Jones and the UK Dominator.

Andrews then defeated Kid Kash, at the Plymouth Wrestling Alliance's 4th Anniversary show on 5 May 2013. Andrews also picked up the DCW:SW Championship, a company that he started based in Crediton, and thus making him a five-time consecutive heavyweight champion (6-times total) in the South West of England. Andrew's first loss of the year came at the hands of Val Kabious in Kamikaze wrestling, and he later lost his Pro Evolution Wrestling championship to Justin Sysum, in June 2013.

Andrews also lost his Pro Wrestling Pride heavyweight championship, being defeated by Mike Mason. Andrews was later defeated in his year long reign of the Varsity Pro Wrestling championship on 1 November by Leon Shah.

=== Swiss Wrestling Entertainment (2014) ===
Andrews moved into 2014 having lost all of his heavyweight championships and continued to challenge in new promotions. Andrews debuted in 2014 for NWA: New Breed Wrestling, as well as WrestleForce, Plex Wrestling and Combat Sports Federation. He also made his first trip to wrestle outside of the United Kingdom, wrestling for Swiss Wrestling Entertainment (SWE). Andrews defeated John Klinger in October, 2014, before challenging El Ligero for the SWE Championship in December, in a losing effort.

=== Pro Wrestling Pride (2014–17) ===
Andrews made his return to Pro Wrestling Pride in October 2014, and in his return, defeated Tyler Hawke and won a battle royale to become the number one contender for the PWP Heavyweight Championship, held by the UK Dominator. The UK Dominator set Andrews up with gauntlet matches for him to compete in before their match in Exeter. Having lost one by count out, The UK Dominator chose a lumberjack match for their title match. Andrews defeated Dominator in this match and won a second Pride Heavyweight Championship on 18 January 2015 in the Corn Exchange, Exeter.

Andrews defended the championship in Teignmouth, besting Wale's Mason Ryan, before losing the championship to Prizefighter's champion 'Big Grizzly' Steve Griffiths. Andrews also lost the rematch, which also included Bram. At PWP Heroes and Legends, Andrews defeated Chris Masters, after an F5. Andrews later won a battle royale to become number one contender again, in Truro in August 2015, where he defeated champion Steve Griffiths, but did not win the championship thanks to the champions advantage, having won by disqualification. Andrews once again challenged for the championship, in Exeter in December 2015, losing a fatal-four way also including Rhyno and the UK Dominator.

Andrews began 2016 without loss, even winning two handicap two on three matches. Andrews again challenged Steve Griffiths for the championship in March, seeing his first loss of the year. In June, Andrews once again won a number one contendership battle royale at PWP Heroes & Legends 3 and challenged champion Eddie Ryan for the championship in Plymouth Guildhall. Before the event, Andrews picked up his first win against old nemesis, Steve Griffiths in Penzance, before losing the championship match to Ryan.

Later, in November 2016, Andrews took part in a six-man elimination match for the PWP Heavyweight Championship, including John Harding, James Baker, Doug Williams, Bram, and champion Eddie Ryan. During the match, Andrews legitimately had his head cut open with a saucepan, but continued the match. After Ryan was eliminated, Andrews wrestled Bram. Following two Piledriver on a chair, Andrews lost the match as the runner-up. During this time, Andrews began to tag with masked wrestler Ultimo Tiger on events.

Andrews made his return to SWE, where he wrestled Lucha Underground wrestler Matt Cross for the number one contendership, but came up short. In July 2017, Andrews appeared at Pro Wrestling Pride's last three shows, winning a tag match with Carlito before defeating Adam Maxxted, and Kenny Kilbane.

=== Big League Wrestling (2017–18) ===
Andrews competed in Big League Wrestling (BLW)'s first event in 2017 BLW Inception, where he defeated "Big Grizzly" Steve Griffiths. Andrews later lost to Psycho Phillips at BLW Gold Rush. Andrews once again wrestled Eddie Ryan this time for BLW in November 2017, defeating Ryan in a hardcore match.

Andrews also made his Pro Wrestling Chaos debut in 2017, where in November, he lost to Nathan Bane.

== Championships and accomplishments ==
- Big League Wrestling
  - BLW Tag Team Championship (1 time) with Adam Maxted
- Devon Wrestling Alliance
  - DWA Trophy Championship (1 time)
  - DWA Tag Team Championship (2 times) - With Sam Andrews
- Dynamic Championship Wrestling: South West
  - DCW: SW Championship (1 time)
- Pro Evolution Wrestling
  - Pro EVW Heavyweight Championship (2 times)
- Pro Wrestling Pride
  - PWP Heavyweight Championship (2 times)
- Varsity Pro Wrestling
  - VPW Championship (2 times)
