= Chris Andrews =

Chris Andrews may refer to:

- Chris Andrews (singer) (born 1942), pop musician and songwriter ("Yesterday Man")
- Chris Andrews (entrepreneur) (1956–2012), digital pioneer, restitution activist
- Chris Andrews (translator) (born 1962), Melbourne-based poet and translator
- Chris Andrews (American politician), New Hampshire politician
- Chris Andrews (Irish politician) (born 1964), Irish Sinn Féin (and formerly Fianna Fáil) politician
- Chris Andrews (rower) (born 1961), ocean rower
- Chris Andrews (wrestler) (born 1984), professional wrestler from Crediton, Devon

== See also ==
- Christopher Andrews (disambiguation)
