= PWP Heavyweight Championship =

Wrestling competition

Details
- Promotion: Pro Wrestling Pride (PWP)
- Date established: April 28, 2013
- Current champion: Bram (wrestler)
- Date won: 25 June 2017
Statistics
- First champion: Chris Andrews
- Most reigns: Multiple (2 Reigns)
- Longest reign: Steve Griffiths (301 days)
- Shortest reign: PJ Jones (<1 day)
- Heaviest champion: Steve Griffiths; 305 lbs (139 kg)

The PWP Heavyweight Championship is a professional wrestling championship owned by Pro Wrestling Pride. It was the second championship incorporated by Pro Wrestling Pride; behind the PWP Catch Division Championship. As the companies main championship, it is usually competed for in the main event of each show.

The Championship was established on the companies 5th show, in Teignmouth, Devon in the main event. Chris Andrews would become the first champion, in a four-way match for the championship; defeating 'Wild Boar' Mike Hitchman, PJ Jones & The UK Dominator.

== PWP Heavyweight Wrestling ==
Unlike the catch division championship, the Heavyweight championship in Pro Wrestling Pride is designed to be fought over by heavyweight wrestlers, rather than the no-limits PWP Catch Division Championship. This is suggested by the lightest wrestler to hold the championship – PJ Jones weighing in at 211 lbs, and the heaviest being Steve Griffiths at 305lbs.

It is also unusual for the championship to be defended in gimmick matches, unlike other championships. The belt is usually contested under regular match rules; with the only exceptions being best two out of three falls matches, a lumberjack match, and a loser leaves town match. Certain tournaments in Pro Wrestling Pride win number one contendership for the championship, including the Prizefighters tournament, and the King of Christmas Rumble winner. To date, only Steve Griffiths has won the championship this way.

Since its inception, the championship has been challenged for by likes of James Storm, Hardcore Holly, Rhyno and Billy Gunn.

Unlike the catch division championship (trophy), and the tag team championships (medallions), the heavyweight championship has always been represented as a traditional championship belt.

== Title History ==
The full history of the championship is listed below. As the championship is currently on hiatus; the current championship reign of Bram is being accumulated; however, it may not be accurate. The championship status as of 12 September 2025.

=== Championship Lineage ===
Key
No.	Overall reign number
Reign	Reign number for the specific champion
Days	Number of days held
Defences	Number of successful defences
+	Current reign is changing daily

No.	Champion	Championship change			Reign statistics			Notes	Ref.
No.	Champion	Date	Event	Location	Reign	Days	Defences	Notes	Ref.
1	Chris Andrews	April 28, 2013	PWP Debut Show	Teignmouth, Devon	1	119	1	Defeated Mike Hitchman, PJ Jones and The UK Dominator to become the inaugural champion	
2	Mike Mason	August 25, 2013	Unnamed	Exmouth, Devon	1	180	2		
3	Danny Walsh	February 21, 2014	Adrenaline Rush Tour – Day 1	Babbacombe, Devon	1	1	0	This was a No Disqualification match	
4	Mike Mason	February 22, 2014	Adrenaline Rush Tour – Day 2	Exeter, Devon	2	1	0		
5	Danny Walsh	February 23, 2014	Adrenaline Rush Tour – Day 3	Chudleigh, Devon	2	160	3	This was a Last Man Standing Loser Leaves Town match.	
6	PJ Jones	August 2, 2014	PWP Nevermore... Never Again – Raven's Last UK Stand	Torquay, Devon	1	0	0		
7	UK Dominator	June 22, 2014	PWP Nevermore... Never Again – Raven's Last UK Stand	Torquay, Devon	1	169	2	Cashed in a Money in the Bank contract won earlier that night.	
8	Chris Andrews	January 18, 2015	PWP One Night Only	Exeter, Devon	2	105	1	This was a lumberjack match.	
9	Steve Griffiths	March 5, 2015	PWP 2nd Anniversary Show	Exeter, Devon	1	136	3		
10	Mr. Kennedy	July 19, 2015	PWP Heroes & Legends	Paignton, Devon	1	42	0	This was a Two out of three falls match	
11	Steve Griffiths	August 30, 2015	PWP Inner City Showdown	Truro, Cornwall	2	301	0		
12	Eddie Ryan	June 26, 2016	PWP One of A Kind	Taunton, Somerset	1	126	5		
13	Bram	October 30, 2016	PWP Undisputed 2	Taunton, Somerset	1	42	0	This was a six-man elimination match, also including Doug Williams, Chris Andrews, James Baker and John Harding	
14	Ultimo Tiger	December 11, 2016	Heroes & Legends 4	Paignton, Devon	1	146	0	This was a No Disqualification match	
15	Bram	May 6, 2017	PWP Live In Falmouth	Falmouth, Cornwall	2	3,041+	6	This was a No Disqualification match.	

== Combined reigns ==
The total list of combined championship days held. As of 12 September 2025.

†	Indicates the current champion

Rank	Wrestler	No. of reigns	Combined days
1	Bram†	2	606+
2	Chris Andrews	2	224
3	Steve Griffiths	2	378
4	Mike Mason	2	181
5	The UK Dominator	1	169
6	Danny Walsh	1	161
7	Ultimo Tiger	1	145
8	Eddie Ryan	1	126
9	Mr. Kennedy	1	49
10	PJ Jones	1	<1

== Triple Crown Champion ==
In professional wrestling, a triple crown champion is a wrestler that has won three of a promotions championships; specifically, a world championship, secondary singles championship and tag team championship. To date, only one wrestler has won the PWP Heavyweight, PWP Catch & PWP tag team Championships – Ultimo Tiger, "completing" the triple crown with his win of the Heavyweight Championship in December 2016. He had previously won the other two championships in 2014, winning the tag team championships with his 'Wrestling Time' partner Darren Saviour.

Champion	Primary championship	Tag team championship	Secondary championship
Champion	PWP Heavyweight Championship	PWP Tag Team Championship	PWP Catch Division Championship
Ultimo Tiger	December 11, 2016	October 5, 2014 (with Darren Saviour)	May 17, 2014

== See also ==
- Professional Wrestling
- List of professional wrestling promotions in the Great Britain and Ireland
- Pro Wrestling Pride
