= Johnny Kidd (wrestler) =

Retired British professional wrestler

Personal information
- Born: John Lowing; 20 September 1955 (age 70) Balham, London, England

Professional wrestling career
- Ring name: Johnny Kidd
- Billed height: 175 cm (5 ft 9 in)
- Billed weight: 102 kg (225 lb)
- Trained by: Ken Joyce; Ampthill Amateur Wrestling Club
- Debut: 1978
- Retired: October 29, 2024

John Lowing (born 20 September 1955) is a British retired professional wrestler best known under the ring name Johnny Kidd. Kidd was best known for his work during what was known as the Golden Era of British Wrestling.

== Professional wrestling career ==
Kidd made his professional wrestling debut in a singles match against Tony Scarlo at the Salisbury City Hall in Salisbury, Wiltshire after being trained by the Ampthill Amateur Wrestling Club.

Kidd found his most success during the Golden Era of British Wrestling when the television show World of Sport was launched featuring wrestling in the mid-1960s.

A practitioner of the British style of wrestling, Kidd found little success in the more modern form of wrestling. However, Kidd would find sanctuary in old-school promotions like Revolution British Wrestling, and Premier Promotions where he won various titles. Kidd still continues to compete in wrestling to this day, wrestling for various promotions around the UK, mostly LDN Wrestling, where has competed on all 4 Legends Showdown events.

Outside of wrestling Kidd is a technical advisor for Vauxhall Motors. In October 2009 Kidd lost to Matt Jarrett at GL1 Gloucester Leisure Centre.

On 28 February 2010, Kidd competed in a special attraction match against Joel Redman in Tiverton, Devon for the Devon Wrestling Association, which he lost after being attacked with a steel chair.

On 30 July 2011, Kidd made his debut for American promotion Chikara, defeating compatriot Johnny Saint in a match contested under World of Sport rules. The following day Saint, teaming with Mike Quackenbush, pinned Kidd, teaming with Colt Cabana, in a tag team match.

Kidd made another appearance for the Devon Wrestling Association in February 2012, competing in a mountevans rules match against DWA Trophy holder Nick Riley for the Trophy itself, in which he was unsuccessful.

In 2015, Kidd announced his retirement would be held in Chikara in May 2016. On 11 November 2015, Kidd wrestled Japanese wrestler Ultimo Dragon, for Pro Wrestling Pride at PWP Heroes & Legends 2, in a losing encounter, but would return to the company in 2016, wrestling three matches, and winning the PWP Catch Division Championship from Scotty Essex. He would lose the rematch in Teignmouth, Devon in a Mountevens match.

On 28 May 2016, Kidd faced Mike Quackenbush at a Chikara event in Manchester in his retirement match, which ended in a draw after eight rounds. Kidd came out of retirement for a Chikara event in Wolverhampton on 2 September 2017, losing to Quackenbush in a British Rules match.

On 23 March 2019 Kidd came out of retirement for a one-off event in Godalming Surrey for LDN Wrestling losing in both of his matches.

In August 2019 Johnny Kidd was inducted into the British Wrestlers Reunion Hall of Fame at the annual Reunion held at The Bridges Public House, receiving the award from Blondie Bob Barratt.

On 7 December 2019, Johnny Kidd wrestled a match in Bucharest, Romania against Tom Fulton, for the co-main event of that night's end of the year event. The match was part of the Deadly Sinners showcase, put forth by Romanian Wrestling Alliance, or RWA for short. The winner of the encounter was Tom Fulton, after winning rounds 2 and 5 of a British rules match; round 1 and 4 were a tie, with Johnny Kidd winning only round 3.

In 2023 Kidd became a referee for LDN Wrestling and in 2024 is seen more in this role than as an active wrestler. He wrestled his last match on October 29, 2024 when he lost to Alan Lee Travis in a Best 2 of 3 Falls match.

== Championships and accomplishments ==
- Dutch Extreme Wrestling

- DEW Hybrid Championship (1 time)

- HCW Championship Wrestling

- HCW Heritage Championship (1 time)

- LDN Wrestling

- Golden Grappler 2007
- LDN British Heavyweight Championship (1 time)

- Premier Promotions

- Ken Joyce Trophy (2008)

- Premier Wrestling Federation

- PWF Welterweight Championship (1 time)

- Pro Wrestling Pride

- PWP Catch Division Championship (1 time)

- Revolution British Wrestling

- RBW British Middleweight Championship (1 time)

- Scottish School of Wrestling

- SSW 24/7 Hardcore Championship (1 time)
