= The UK Kid =

British professional wrestler

Personal information
- Born: Thomas Jones

Professional wrestling career
- Ring name: The UK Kid
- Billed height: 5 ft 10 in (1.78 m)
- Billed weight: 185 lb (84 kg)
- Billed from: Fareham, Hampshire, England
- Trained by: Kris Kay; The Shawn Michaels Wrestling Academy; Dory Funk's Funking Conservatory

Thomas Jones is a British professional wrestler and promoter better known by his ring name The UK Kid. As well as founding his own promotion Varsity Pro Wrestling, Jones has competed in various other professional wrestling promotions in the United Kingdom including All Star Wrestling, LDN Wrestling, Pro Wrestling Guerrilla, Real Quality Wrestling and Catch Wrestling Council.

== Career ==
Thomas Jones began training at the age of 16 under Kris Kay in Gosport, England. He later went on to train at the Dory Funk's Funking Conservatory. Following his training he went on to make his professional wrestling debut in August 1999, and later would make his debut in the United States against Kris Krugar in San Antonio, Texas after Graduation from the Shawn Michaels Wrestling Academy and working in Texas for HBK's Texas Wrestling Alliance

=== Varsity Pro Wrestling ===
In 2006, Jones began running the Varsity Pro Wrestling (VPW) promotion and School of Excellence, performing throughout England as he trained future British stars Chris Andrews, Rob Holte, Robbie Everest, Sam Andrews and others. He also began the training process for Sheamus. The school runs regular sessions several times per week and features guest trainers such as Bob Holly, Kip James and The Road Dogg several times per year.

In February 2008, Jones, as the UK Kid, worked an angle on a VPW event in Portsmouth with Billy Gunn, interfering after Gunn's match, beating him with a chair and leaving him bleeding. Gunn vowed revenge on the next VPW Portsmouth show, though it came at the hands of another individual. When a change to Gunn's contractual status with TNA made him incapable of attending the VPW show in May, he sent long-time friend Bob Holly to "teach the UK Kid a lesson", something that Holly accomplished in a tables, ladders and chairs match held in front of over 600 rabid fans.

This highly successful event was followed up with a return to the Portsmouth Guildhall in August, an event that began with the UK Kid revealing that he had arranged for a 15-foot steel cage to be provided and challenged Holly to a rematch. Holly declined, saying that he had already beaten the Kid in a TLC match, so felt it would be unfair to prevent others on the roster getting a chance to humble Jones's arrogant alter-ego. Holly backed "The Devon Powerhouse" Chris Andrews for the match and offered him support in a backstage interview before the match. In the main event of the show, the UK Kid and Andrews wrestled in the cage for over 20 minutes with Andrews obtaining a large gash on his forehead as a result of the intense action. The resourceful UK Kid eventually managed to fight off Andrews's onslaught long enough to retrieve a roll of electrical tape he had sneaked into the cage before the match, and used it to secure Andrews to the ring ropes. With Andrews immobilised, the UK Kid brought a chair into the ring and began pounding his opponent. Bob Holly, who had defeated Matt Vaughn earlier in the evening and was watching backstage, returned to ringside, entered the cage and snatched the chair away from the UK Kid. A tense moment followed before Holly, to the shock of the audience, began beating the defenceless Andrews. Andy Boy Simmonz, Jason Dunce, Jake McCluskey and a host of VPW officials all attempted to come to Andrews's rescue but were prevented from entering the cage by both Holly and the UK Kid. Eventually the beat-down subsided and Andrews — now a bloody mess — was helped backstage and to a local medical facility.

In October, on the next VPW Guildhall show, The UK Kid and Holly revealed their "International Alliance", explaining that Chris Andrews needed to be put in his place. Andrews brought backup in the form of Billy Gunn's long time tag team partner, The Road Dogg and they issued challenges to Holly and the UK Kid respectively. Later that night, UK Kid defeated The Road Dogg by pinfall, following interference by Bob Holly.

Come February 2010 and the promotion's return to Portsmouth, the evening started badly and just got worse for the UK Kid. During an interview segment, he and Bob Holly belittled teenage sensation "Mr. Moonsault" Jake McCluskey, who had just picked up first VPW victory. An impromptu match followed where McCluskey took advantage of the UK Kid's overconfidence, wrapping him up in a small package for his second victory of the night. In the main event of the evening, Holly and the Kid teamed up in a losing effort against Chris Andrews and Billy Gunn.

The following evening in Basingstoke saw the UK Kid gain a measure of revenge, pinning Billy Gunn in a singles match but later being on the losing team in a six-man tag match between himself, Bob Holly and Rob Holte facing Gunn, Jake McCluskey and Chris Andrews.

=== Work for other promotions ===
In August 2006, The UK Kid teamed with Charlie Rage to lose to The Big Show in a handicap match at Wembley Arena, London for WWE.

The UK Kid was a regular addition to the !Bang! TV Show after training with Dory Funk Jr in Florida, and assisting in training camps and seminars in Florida when ever in the area. Working with names such as New Japan's Osamu Nishamura, Paul London and Bang TV Regular Adam Windsor.

February 2003 The UK Kid made his All Star Wrestling debut, working the circuit around the UK, holiday camps during the summer often up to 100 shows during the summer period balanced with traditional town Venue shows for top UK promoter Brian Dixon. Stars of the VPW School of Excellence and VPW could often be seen getting in ring experience on the All Star stage including AEW Star and former IWGP Heavyweight Champion Jay White.

On 28 August 2008, at Scottish School of Wrestling's "Tainted Tradition" event, The UK Kid won the SPWO UK Championship after defeating 9 other men in a 10-man Battle royal.

On 17 April 2012 the UK Kid wrestled a dark match for WWE at the London tapings of SmackDown, losing to Antonio Cesaro.

17th May 2013, Fairfield Halls, Croydon. The UK Kid performing as The Stomper would step into the ring with British Legend and legitimate tough guy Skull Murphy in an unsanctioned hardcore match.

2017 onwards The UK Kid was seen mostly wrestling and teaching in France and across Europe for various promotions.

== Championships and accomplishments ==
- Scottish School of Wrestling
  - SPWO UK Championship (1 time)
- Varsity Pro Wrestling
  - Varsity Pro Wrestling Championship (1 time)
