= Ultimo Tiger =

Scottish professional wrestler

Personal information
- Born: Glen Ferguson; 4 June 1990 (age 36) Glasgow, Scotland

Professional wrestling career
- Ring name(s): Ultimo Tiger; Glen Oulette; Glen Alexander
- Billed height: 5 ft 11 in (1.80 m)
- Billed weight: 183 lb (83 kg)
- Billed from: The Tiger's Den
- Trained by: Joel Redman; The UK Dominator; Darren Saviour
- Debut: 2013

Glen Ferguson (born 4 June 1990) better known by his ring name Ultimo Tiger is a Scottish professional wrestler currently active in the United Kingdom. Ferguson, originally from Glasgow, Scotland started his in-ring career in 2013 in Devon. Ferguson competes underneath a mask in the same style as Mexican luchadores as Ultimo Tiger, but also wrestles without a mask as Glen Alexander.

As of October 2017, Ferguson is a former heavyweight champion, having successfully won seven professional wrestling championships, and is the first Pro Wrestling Pride Triple Crown Champion.

== Early life ==
Ferguson grew up in Glasgow, Scotland and moved to Devon at a young age. He was a member of the Exeter metal band Pillars.

== Professional wrestling career ==
=== Early career and first championship matches (2012–2014) ===
Ferguson began wrestling training in 2009, training with Joel Redman and the UK Dominator at the Devon Wrestling Alliance wrestling school; however due to other commitments did not pursue wrestling further at that time. In 2012, Ferguson started pro wrestling training again at the Limited Edition Promotions training school in Torquay, which coincided with his brother Darren opening Pro Wrestling Pride. Later that year Ferguson joined Megaslam wrestling in Yorkshire at their annual holiday camp tour, before his debut match for PWP against Morgan Webster in April 2013; which he would win.

Tiger wrestled exclusively for Pro Wrestling Pride in 2013, with his second match being involved in a fatal-4-way for the PWP Catch Division Championship, won by Darren Saviour. He challenged for the championship twice more in 2013, losing on both occasions to Tyler Hawke. This led to an "I Quit" match between the two, with Tiger putting his mask on the line for the championship. Tiger defeated Hawke to win his first professional wrestling championship. Tiger held onto the championship for just over a month, but lost his first defence of the belt to Dick Riley in Saltash, Cornwall.

=== Wrestling Time (2014–2015) ===
Tiger tagged with Raven, and Darren Saviour in a hardcore 6-man tag in August 2014, which was thought to be Raven's last ever UK appearance, as the trio defeated Hawke, and his stable mates (Mark Walsh & Calum Cain). Tiger start edup a new tag team, teaming with Saviour, calling the team "Wrestling Time", based on the popular animated TV show Adventure Time. The pair wpm the vacant PWP Tag team Championships on 5 October 2014, defeating French pair 'Le Cousins Autier', for Tiger's second championship.

"Wrestling Time" looked to hold the championships into 2015, with a win over The Dunne Bros (Damien Dunne and Pete Dunne), but lost the belts to Danny and Mark Walsh in December. On 25 January 2015, Tiger wrestled former Tiger Mask Koji Kanemoto, at PWP Fighting Spirit, but would lose. Tiger claimed the match was "probably one of the biggest moments in wrestling (he) will ever have." Tiger then defeated Dick Riley, before claiming his second PWP Catch Division Championship once again defeating Tyler Hawke in Newton Abbot.

Tiger made his debut outside of Pro Wrestling Pride when he wrestled for the Plymouth Wrestling Alliance tag team championships on 22 February 2015. "Wrestling Time" challenged P. J. Jones and The UK Dominator, for the belts, but would come up short. Tiger returned to defeat John Harding at the companies 6th anniversary show, at the Plymouth Guildhall. Tiger also wrestled for the Combat Sports Federation in May, defeating Joshua Knott. He defended the Catch Division championship throughout the first half of 2015, defeating Chris Sabin (in a four-way including Harding and Knott), Jigsaw, Rockstar Spud and Kiaser in a triple threat and Chris Hero. On 2 August 2015 Tiger lost the belt to Doug Williams, when the latter cashed in a Money in the Bank briefcase, having only just defeated Hero. Tiger regained the championship against Williams two weeks later in Taunton.

On 21 August 2015 Tiger successfully defended the championship in a fatal-4-way match in Newton Abbot, defeating Gideon, John Harding and Eddie Ryan. Later that month, on 30 August, Tiger defeated JD Knight and defended the championship in Truro. In September 2015 Tiger took part in the 'Plex Wrestling King of the Brit's tournament, with his semi-final coming to a double-pin draw against El Ligero. He returned twice more in 2015 defeating Preston Sage & Lion Kid. He concluded 2015 as Catch Division Champion, winning another 4-way match at PWP Heroes & Legends 2, defeating Scotty Essex, Tiger Ali & Ho Ho Lun.

=== Heavyweight Champion (2016) ===
Starting in 2016 Tiger wrestled Kenny Omega in Taunton, in a non-championship match; which he lost. He also lost his Catch Division Championship, in a triple threat when Scotty Essex pinned Tajiri on 7 February 2016. Shortly afterwards, Tiger travelled to Portugal, where he wrestled for the French APC (Association les Professionnels du Catch) championship, but did not defeat champion Hellmer Lo'Guennec.

Tiger got his first opportunity for the PWP Heavyweight Championship on 28 February 2016, however he lost to Steve Griffiths, before winning a match against Scotty Essex for the Catch title in March, 2016. Despite winning the match, Tiger did not win the championship because he won the match by disqualification. On 8 May 2016 he wrestled for the Wrestle-1 Cruiserweight Championship, in a match against Kotaro Suzuki in Penzance.

In May 2016 Tiger started appearing for the Devon Wrestling Association, where he defeated Tyler Hawke, and returned later that year to wrestle the UK Dominator, and Joshua Knott. On 26 June 2016 he won a six-man tag team match at PWP One of a Kind

He made his debut for Pro Evolution Wrestling winning a tag team match with Matt Maddoxx, defeating the Heritage City Hitmen, before on the 10th, winning a four-way including P. J. Black, Mark Andrews and Scotty Essex to regain the PWP Catch Division Trophy for a record fourth time. He defended the belt three times at Hyper Japan 2016; against Kelly Sixx, Keizer, and Spanish wrestler HardFlyer.

Tiger challenged Abyss on 18 August 2016, losing the match in Bideford, Devon. Tiger defended the catch championship twice against Josh Knott, with the second encounter resulting in a double disqualification. Tiger lost a non-title match in Tavistock to Kelly Sixx, leading to a PWP Catch Division Championship Tables, Ladders & Chairs Triple Threat between Sixx, Tiger & Knott. Sixx won match, pinning Knott to win the championship with Tiger handcuffed in the ring.

Tiger challenged for the PWP Heavyweight Championship once again, this time facing champion Bram. He successfully wom the heavyweight championship, defeating Bram with a piledriver, and a balcony dive. In winning the championship, he became the first person to win the Pro Wrestling Pride Triple Crown; winning the PWP Tag Team Championships, the PWP Catch Division Championship, and the PWP Heavyweight Championship. He defended the championship successfully against Kay Jutler in Penzance, in December.

=== Championship Defences (2017) ===
Tiger took the PWP Heavyweight Championship into 2017, defeating Dick Justice on 22 January 2017, before tagging with him later that evening. He had wins over John Harding and Joel Redman for the championship. Tiger defended the belt in a triple threat at PWP Prizefighters 2017 against Tyler Hawke & Lomaxx. He appeared for Exposure Entertainment Wrestling, wrestling in a four-corners tag team match with Tyler Hawke, at EWE Luchamania II. He defeated Gideon at Battle for Bideford 4 but lost the championship back to Bram, who he had defeated the championship for in Falmouth.

After losing the heavyweight championship, Tiger wrestled two current Impact Wrestling champions, where he lost to Impact X Division Champion Low Kion 7 May 2017. He would also come up short against then Impact Grand Champion Moose, on 25 June 2017; but neither championship was on the line. Tiger won his return match to the Devon Wrestling Alliance, defeating Buddaine.

Tiger competed in the PWP Heroes & Legends 5 weekend; competing in Taunton, Launceston, and Plymouth, winning two triple threats (Against Eddie Dennis & HardFlyer, and HardFlyer & Hellmer Lo'Guennec), before losing Simon Grimm on the Sunday. Tiger would later win the Fight League Pro championship in Brussels on 12 November, defeating longtime nemesis Bram. After the fold of Pro Wrestling Pride, Tiger would later remove his mask full-time, and wrestle as Glen Alexander.

== Other media ==
Ferguson was featured in the "Golden Stars" trading cards set, as Ultimo Tiger with creator Ruben Cabral saying that Tiger "is the type of wrestler that makes you jump out of your chair moment after moment and you never know what’s coming next."

Ferguson is an avid video game streamer, under the name "Glenasawrus".

== Championships and accomplishments ==
- Pro Wrestling Pride
  - PWP Heavyweight Championship (1 time)
  - PWP Catch Division Championship (4 times)
  - PWP Tag Team Championships (1 time) - With Darren Saviour
  - PWP Triple Crown Championship (1 time)
- Fight League Pro Wrestling
  - Fight League Champion (1 time, current) - As Glen Alexander

== Luchas de Apuestas record ==
Winner (wager)	Loser (wager)	Location	Event	Date	Notes
Ultimo Tiger (mask)	Tyler Hawke (Championship)	Torquay, Devon	PWP Pride & Glory 2014	17 May 2014	
