= Clint Evans =

Clint Evans may refer to:

- Clint Evans (baseball)
- Clint Evans (rower)
