= Hardcore Holly =

American professional wrestler (born 1963)

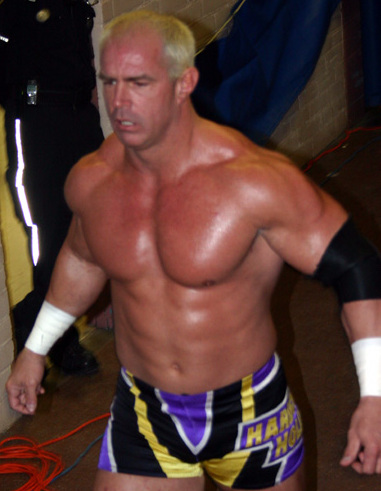
- Holly in 2005

Personal information
- Born: Robert William Howard; January 29, 1963 (age 63) Glendale, California, U.S.
- Spouse: Linda Kievet (m. 2010)
- Children: 1

Professional wrestling career
- Ring name(s): Bob Holly; Bob "Spark Plug" Holly; Bob Howard; Bombastic Bob; Hardcore Holly; Thurman "Sparky" Plugg
- Billed height: 6 ft 0 in (183 cm)
- Billed weight: 235 lb (107 kg)
- Billed from: Mobile, Alabama
- Trained by: Bob Sweetan; Rip Tyler
- Debut: May 23, 1988

Robert William Howard (born January 29, 1963) is an American professional wrestler. He is best known for his tenure in WWE, where he performed under the ring name Hardcore Holly.

After debuting in 1988, Holly worked for World Organization of Wrestling, Smoky Mountain Wrestling, and other independent promotions, before joining WWE full-time in 1994. Initially portraying the character of a NASCAR driver, Thurman "Sparky" Plugg, his name was soon changed to Bob "Spark Plug" Holly. In 1998, under the name of Bombastic Bob, he formed a team with Bart Gunn known as The Midnight Express. Towards the end of that same year, Howard reverted to the Bob Holly name as he joined the stable titled The J.O.B. Squad.

After the disintegration of The J.O.B. Squad in early 1999, Howard won his first singles title in WWE and shortly after he became known simply as Hardcore Holly, developing a stern and punishing persona in the process. After taking up the Hardcore Holly gimmick, he was joined by on-screen cousins Crash in 1999 and Molly in 2000. In 2002, Hardcore Holly suffered a broken neck during a match with Brock Lesnar, which sidelined him for over a year. Upon his return, he engaged in a major feud with Lesnar for the WWE Championship and minor feuds with other wrestlers, such as Mr. Kennedy and Rob Van Dam. He later formed a tag team combination with Cody Rhodes in 2007. Holly was released from WWE in 2009, wrestling only intermittently on the independent circuit afterwards. In 2013, he published his autobiography, The Hardcore Truth: The Bob Holly Story.

Championships held by Holly over the course of his career include the WWF/E World Tag Team Championship, NWA World Tag Team Championship, and WWF Hardcore Championship.

== Early life ==
Robert William Howard was born on January 29, 1963 in Glendale, California, where he and his older brother were raised by his mother. After his mother remarried, the family relocated to Ventura, California and then to Grants Pass, Oregon, where Howard attended Grants Pass High School. After graduating, Howard worked in a beer warehouse before moving to Mobile, Alabama with the mother of his daughter, Stephanie. Howard spent several years working as a mechanic for Meineke (supplementing his income by boxing in bars) before joining Taylor Wharton as a pipe cutter, where he trained as a welder. Howard later moved to Cowin Equipment, where he worked as a mechanic and welder.

== Professional wrestling career ==
=== Early career (1988–1990) ===
Holly trained under Bob Sweetan, Marcelle Pringle, and Rip Tyler, and debuted in 1988 in the Mobile area in the World Organization Of Wrestling promotion where he held titles on and off, including the WOW Tag Team Championship with Ron Starr when they defeated the Rock 'n' Roll Express. From there, he wrestled in Memphis and then in the NWA (National Wrestling Alliance) with moderate success.

=== World Championship Wrestling (1990–1991) ===
In 1990, Holly began making television appearances in World Championship Wrestling under the name "Bob Holly", being utilized primarily as a jobber. His first match came on July 30 in Gainesville, Georgia, when he was defeated via submission by WCW United States Heavyweight Champion Lex Luger. Holly then wrestled in a six-man match in Marietta, Georgia on August 6, teaming with Tim "Powerhouse" Parker and Brad Bratton against Ric Flair, Arn Anderson and Barry Windham. On August 13, Holly faced Flair in a singles match that aired on World Championship Wrestling, losing via submission. After an absence of several months, he made a final appearance at a World Championship Wrestling taping on January 21 teaming with Dave Johnson in an unsuccessful effort against The Freebirds in a match that aired February 9, 1991.

=== Smoky Mountain Wrestling (1991–1992) ===
Holly joined Jim Cornette's new Smoky Mountain Wrestling promotion and made his debut at the company's very first television taping on October 30 in Greenville, South Carolina, defeating Tim Frye. Billed as "Hollywood" Bob Holly, he received a televised push and portrayed a snobbish-street thug, West Coast character. Afterward, he worked for Buck Robley and The NWF out of Louisiana. He teamed with Robert Gibson there as the Rock N Roll Express. In 1993, Holly did not wrestle at all that year and took a hiatus.

=== World Wrestling Federation / World Wrestling Entertainment (1994–2009) ===
==== Spark Plug (1994–1997) ====
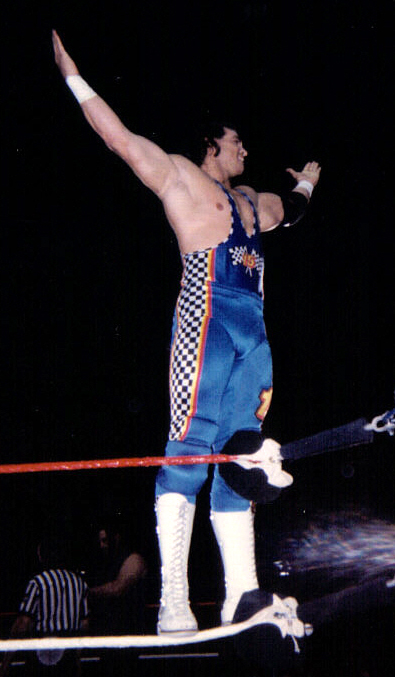
Bob "Spark Plug" Holly in 1996

In 1991, Holly made his initial appearance in the World Wrestling Federation (WWF). Again, he was portrayed as a jobber using the name "Bob Holly". His sole match was teaming with Mike Sample in a loss to The Bushwhackers on the March 30 edition of WWF Superstars (match was taped on March 11 in Pensacola, Florida).

Holly returned to the WWF on January 11, 1994. He competed in the 1994 Royal Rumble match, lasting over 21 minutes. His initial gimmick was that of a NASCAR driver turned wrestler called Thurman "Sparky" Plugg. By late summer 1994, Holly changed his name to Bob "Spark Plugg" Holly. According to Holly, he went to Vince McMahon and asked him to change his name because he didn't like the name Thurman and his friends and family were teasing him over it, but wanted to keep the NASCAR gimmick, and McMahon agreed.

Holly alongside 1-2-3 Kid took part at WWF World Tag Team Championship Tournament (1995). After defeating Well Dunn and Heavenly Bodies, they reached the finals, which was held at the Royal Rumble in January 1995. There, Holly and the 1–2–3 Kid defeated Bam Bam Bigelow and Tatanka to crown new WWF Tag Team Champions. Their title reign lasted only one day, however, as the next day, on WWF Monday Night Raw, the duo lost the tag team title to The Smoking Gunns.

On the May 7, 1995 (taped April 26, 1995) episode of WWF Action Zone, Holly pinned WWF Intercontinental Champion Jeff Jarrett in a title match, but as Jarrett had his foot on the ropes the title was vacated. Later on in the show, Jarrett defeated Holly in a rematch for the vacant title after pinning Holly with a roll-up. Holly's title win is no longer recognized by WWE. Holly then competed in the 1995 King of the Ring tournament, defeating Mantaur to qualify before losing to The Roadie in the quarterfinals. He was then the first WWF pay-per-view opponent of Hunter Hearst Helmsley, losing to him at SummerSlam.

At Survivor Series, Holly was part of the Underdogs team along with Marty Jannetty, Hakushi, and Barry Horowitz. They were defeated by the Body Donnas team of Skip, Doctor of Desire Tom Prichard, Rad Radford and the 1–2–3 Kid.

Despite lasting nearly 40 minutes in the Royal Rumble, Holly made very few television appearances in the WWF throughout 1996 and 1997. In 1997 he scored two victories over Owen Hart on the May 19 episode of Raw by pinfall and Brian Pillman on the August 4 episode of Raw by count-out. Afterwards, Holly was inactive during the rest of 1997 and temporarily went back to welding.

==== The Midnight Express (1998) ====
In February 1998, Holly returned after a six-month hiatus with newly blonde hair, and together with Bart Gunn joined forces with Jim Cornette as part of Jeff Jarrett's National Wrestling Alliance stable. Holly, renamed "Bombastic Bob", and Gunn, renamed "Bodacious Bart", were known collectively as The Midnight Express. The tag team defeated The Headbangers for the NWA World Tag Team Championship on March 30, 1998 and held the titles until August 14 of that year, when they were defeated by The Border Patrol. They challenged the New Age Outlaws for the WWF Tag Team Championship at the King of the Ring pay-per-view, but were unsuccessful.

In mid-1998, Holly competed in the WWF Brawl for All, a 16-man shootfighting tournament. He was eliminated in the first round by the eventual winner, Bart Gunn, who defeated him on points; Holly has the distinction of being the only one of Gunn's opponents he was unable to knock out. They disbanded in July and Holly went on his own, working in lower card matches on Shotgun Saturday Night.

==== J.O.B. Squad (1998–1999) ====
In November 1998, Al Snow, Holly, and Scorpio united and formed the J.O.B. Squad (later members of the stable also included Gillberg and The Blue Meanie). During that same month on an edition of Raw, they helped Mankind defeat Ken Shamrock and The Big Boss Man in a triple threat match, as Mankind (though not a member of the stable) became a close associate. At 1998's Survivor Series pay-per-view, Holly and Scorpio defeated The Legion of Doom (Animal and Droz) in a warmup match. Two months later at the Royal Rumble pay-per-view, Holly and Scorpio notably defeated Too Much in one of the warmup matches.

In February 1999, the members gradually drifted apart: Scorpio was released by the WWF, Gillberg was later phased out of storylines, and The Blue Meanie allied with Goldust; thus, after dwindling down to only two members, Snow wrestled against himself on an edition of Raw before Holly came down to the ring to prevent Snow from hurting himself. The two fought and it led to the formal breakup of the J.O.B. Squad. Later that month at St. Valentine's Day Massacre: In Your House, Holly defeated Snow for the WWF Hardcore Championship to permanently end the J.O.B. Squad. A week later on Raw, for his title defense match against former partner Bart Gunn, Holly formally changed his name to Hardcore Holly.

==== Hardcore Champion and the Holly Cousins (1999–2001) ====
Holly dropped the championship to Billy Gunn on the March 15, 1999 edition of Raw, but regained the title two weeks later at WrestleMania XV, in a triple threat hardcore match also involving Al Snow. He lost the title to Al Snow at Backlash, and soon began referring to himself as "The Big Shot", feuding with Big Show and Kane. On the August 16, 1999 edition of Raw, Holly introduced his on-screen "cousin" Crash Holly, where both ended up taunting and fighting each other, projecting a rather strained cousins relationship.

They unsuccessfully challenged for the WWF Tag Team Championship at SummerSlam. Although simultaneously arguing over who was the better Holly, they won the WWF Tag Team Championship on the October 18, 1999 edition of Raw, by defeating the Rock 'n' Sock Connection, after Triple H interfered. They lost the titles two weeks later to Mankind and Al Snow on the November 4 edition of SmackDown! The Holly Cousins and Too Cool defeated Edge, Christian and The Hardy Boyz in a traditional four-on-four elimination match at Survivor Series, where Holly was the lone survivor.

On the November 18, 1999 edition of SmackDown!, Holly challenged The Big Show for the WWF Championship, but was defeated. In early 2000, Hardcore Holly pursued the Intercontinental Championship, losing a match against Chyna due to interference from Chris Jericho. He then lost a Triple Threat Match against Chyna and Jericho for the championship at the Royal Rumble, which was won by Jericho. He lost two more subsequent matches to Jericho for the title, ending their feud.

After Crash Holly won the Hardcore Championship on the February 24, 2000 episode of SmackDown!, the cousins began feuding over the title. Holly won the Hardcore Championship in a "hardcore" 13-man battle royal at WrestleMania 2000. He lost the title back to Crash the following night on Raw. He then sporadically challenged for both the Intercontinental and Hardcore championships the following months. Holly then missed several months of ring time due to a legitimately broken arm, suffered in a match with Kurt Angle on the June 29, 2000 edition of SmackDown!. After his return, later in 2000, another on-screen cousin, Molly Holly was introduced. Holly returned on the November 13, 2000 edition of Raw, where Holly, Crash Holly and The Undertaker defeated Edge, Christian, and Kurt Angle in a six-man tag match. At Survivor Series, Holly faced William Regal for the WWF European Championship but lost by disqualification. Holly got a rematch at the title at Armageddon but was defeated by Regal. At the Royal Rumble, Holly competed in the 30-man Royal Rumble match but was eliminated by The Undertaker. In February, Holly won the Hardcore title three more times, but each time re-lost the title moments later under the "24/7 Hardcore rule". Holly competed in the King of the Ring tournament but lost to Kurt Angle in the first round. Then Holly continued teaming with Crash until December 2001.

==== Various storylines (2002–2006) ====
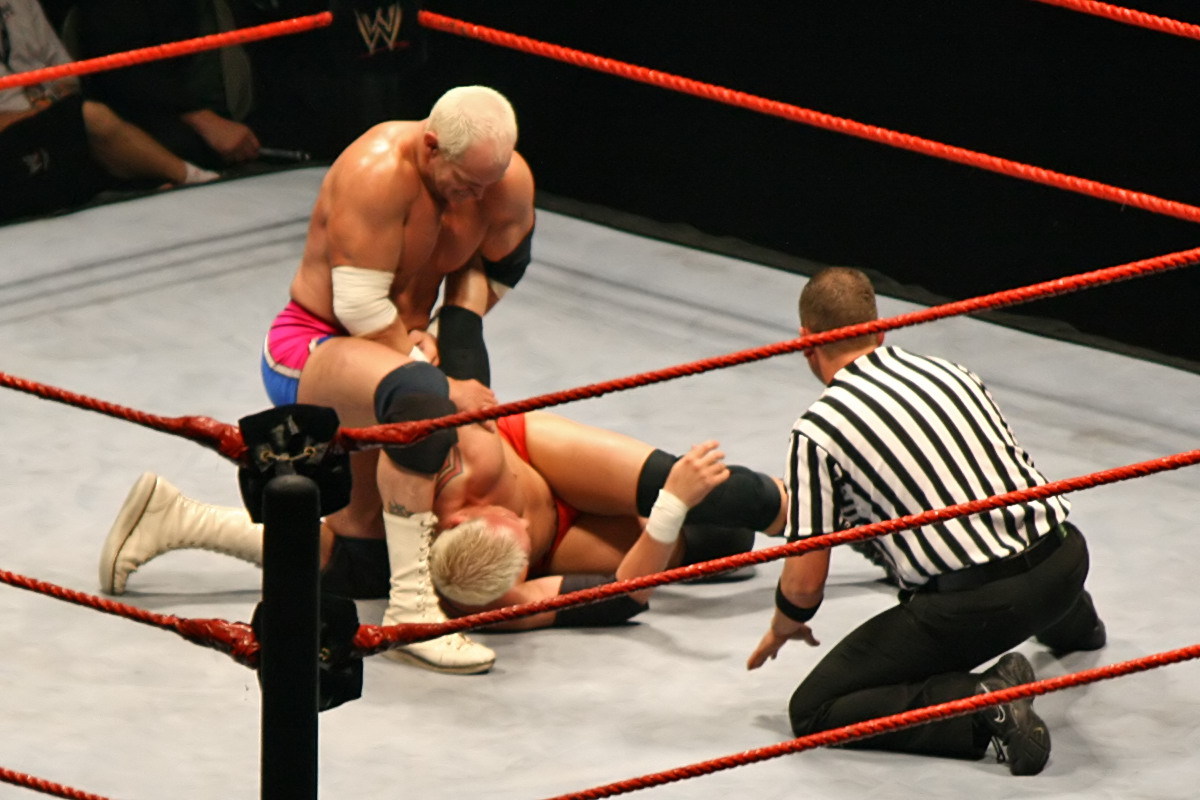
Holly with an armbar locked firmly on Mr. Kennedy

In early 2002, Howard worked as one of a collection of trainer/hosts for Tough Enough II, a reality competition television series produced by WWE and MTV where participants underwent professional wrestling training and competed for a contract with WWE. In 2002, Holly turned heel on SmackDown! and began a short feud with Randy Orton. He then had a minor feud with Kurt Angle after eliminating him from a battle royal, turning him face again. On the September 12, 2002, edition of SmackDown!, Holly suffered a broken neck during a match against Brock Lesnar, when he was powerbombed neck first on the mat. He had a thirteen-month hiatus from wrestling after surgery. While awaiting surgery, Holly made a guest appearance on Tough Enough III. The show caused some controversy when, during the course of a practice match, Howard stiffed a competitor, Matt Cappotelli, leaving him bleeding. Cappotelli later said that there was no ill-feeling between the two because of the incident.

In October 2003, Holly began training at Ohio Valley Wrestling, WWE's developmental territory, in preparation for his return to the main roster. Holly returned at the Survivor Series pay-per-view on November 16 for revenge against Lesnar for his neck injury. He challenged Lesnar to a match for the WWE Championship at the Royal Rumble on January 25, 2004, but lost.

During 2004 and early 2005, he formed short-lived tag teams with Billy Gunn, and later Charlie Haas in the hunt for the WWE Tag Team Championship, but was unsuccessful with both partners. He also failed to claim the WWE Championship from John "Bradshaw" Layfield (JBL) in a hardcore match on the October 14 episode of SmackDown!.

In mid-2005, Holly went into singles competition trying to acquire the United States Championship from Orlando Jordan. After being defeated twice by Jordan, Holly finally managed to pick up a non-title win over Jordan via disqualification on WWE Velocity, which aired on August 6, 2005. Holly then entered a short feud with SmackDown! newcomer, Mr. Kennedy. This feud climaxed on October 9, 2005, at No Mercy, where Kennedy defeated Holly after a Green Bay Plunge.

Holly then underwent several surgeries to repair nagging injuries. He was hospitalized after a staph infection developed in a right arm wound. The infection was possibly career-threatening, as doctors were worried at one point that the arm may have to undergo amputation. The subsequent treatments were a success, however.

==== ECW Championship pursuits (2006–2007) ====
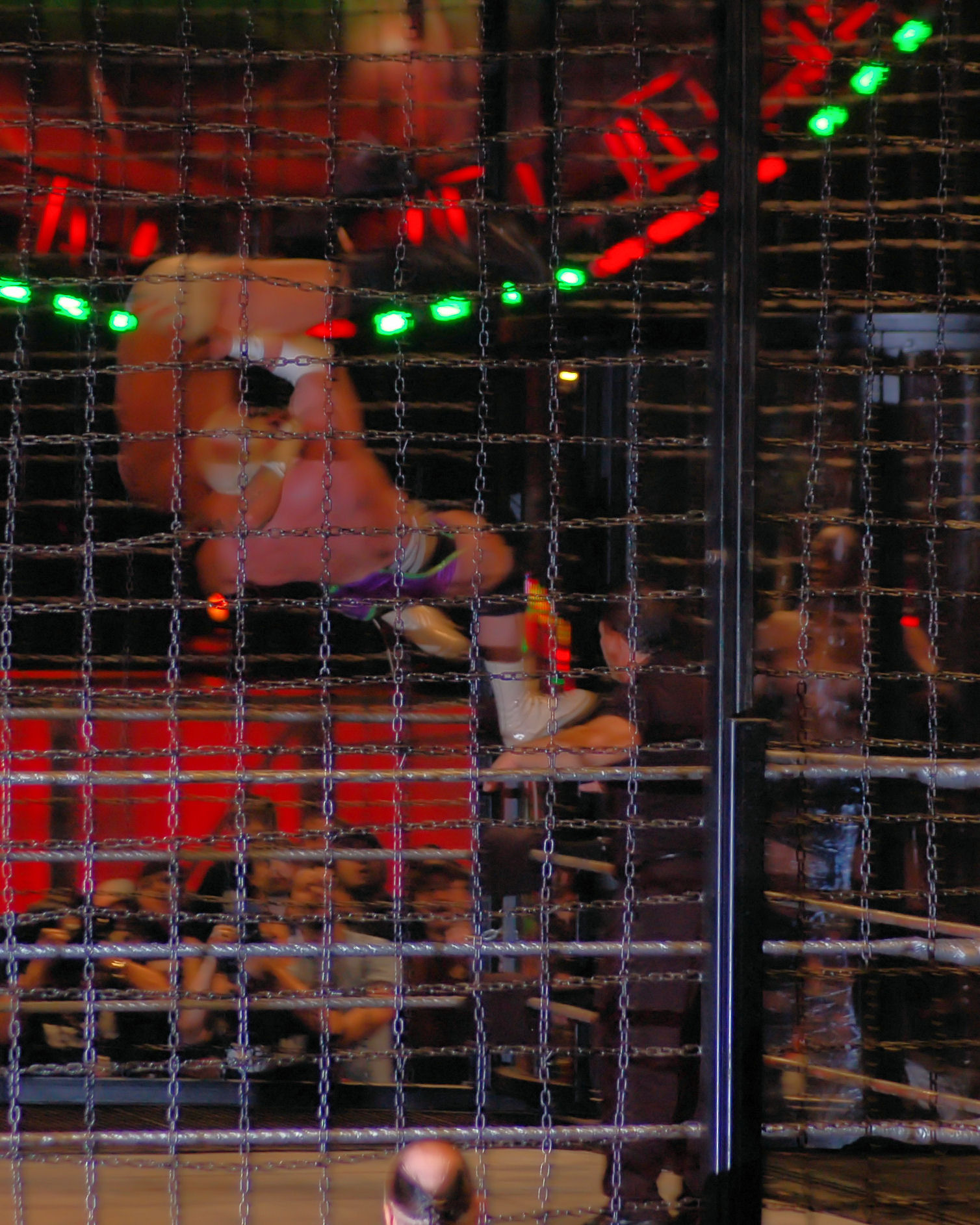
Holly performing a superplex on CM Punk in the Extreme Elimination Chamber at the December to Dismember event

Holly made a surprise appearance at WWE's ECW house show event on August 21, 2006, in Allentown, Pennsylvania, defeating Balls Mahoney. Holly made his ECW television debut the next night, August 22, appearing in a promo with Paul Heyman, and later attacking Rob Van Dam and Danny Doring during a match. Holly, now as a heel, soon joined with Heyman and his other associates to feud with Van Dam and others.

On September 26, 2006, Holly received 24 stitches from WWE Doctor Ferdinand Rios in his back after suffering a severe laceration during an Extreme Rules match against Rob Van Dam when he landed on the metal railing of a table he was suplexing Van Dam out of the ring and through during an ECW show in Tulsa, Oklahoma. Holly obtained the injury early in the match but continued to wrestle until the match's conclusion when he was pinned. After the match, as he was being helped out of the ring, he received a standing ovation from fans. The legitimate incident caused fans to cheer Holly in the following weeks, leading him to become a face character and a feud with Paul Heyman's other enforcer Test. His second to latest run as a face was short lived as he eventually turned on Rob Van Dam when they were partners in a tag match.

When Sabu was found kayfabe unconscious in the locker room area before the Extreme Elimination Chamber at December to Dismember on December 3, Holly was chosen as his replacement. Holly entered with Rob Van Dam as the first of two combatants. He was the second to be eliminated; he was eliminated by Test by a running big boot. Subsequently, he entered into a feud with CM Punk whereby Holly, now a tweener, showed his endurance by surviving Punk's Anaconda Vice submission hold. Holly then gave Punk his first loss in ECW; Punk had been undefeated for half a year. After Test replaced Holly in a match against ECW World Champion Bobby Lashley, Holly vowed he would become champion whether he faced Test or Lashley. Holly then was one of the ECW superstars entered in the Royal Rumble on January 28, 2007, but was eliminated by The Great Khali. Holly soon became the number one contender for Lashley's ECW World Championship and faced off against Lashley, albeit unsuccessfully.

On the April 3 episode of ECW, Holly lost to Snitsky. After the match, Snitsky wedged Holly's arm between the steel steps and repeatedly hit the steps with a steel chair, resulting in a broken arm in the storyline. Holly had surgery on April 16 because of a staph infection and missed around five months.

==== Teaming with Cody Rhodes and departure (2007–2009) ====
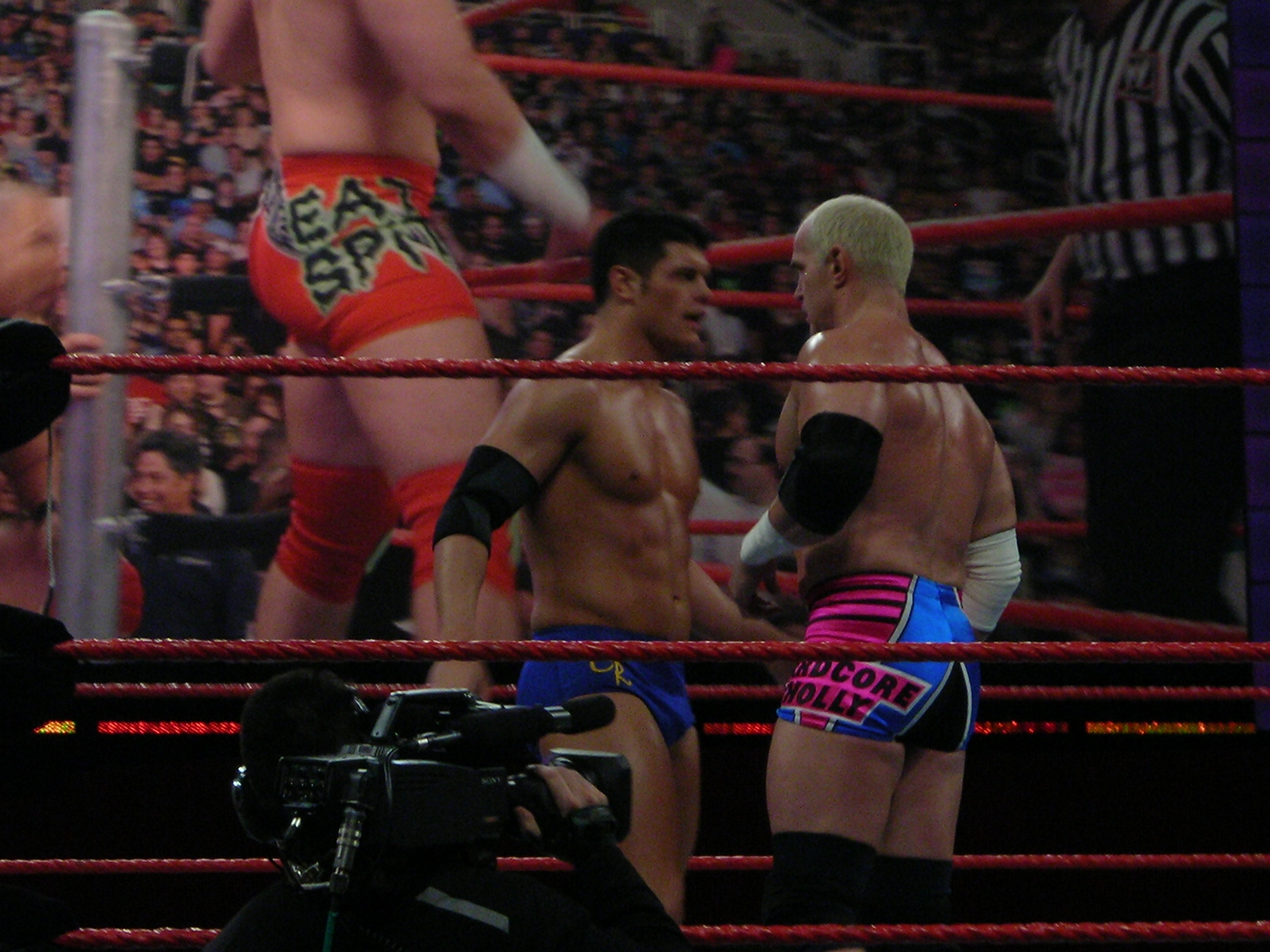
Holly's final feud was against rookie Cody Rhodes, who became his protégé. The two won the World Tag Team Championship together.

Holly was drafted back to SmackDown! from ECW on June 17, 2007, as part of the Supplemental Draft. Despite his draft, Holly would return to in-ring action on the Raw brand by September 24, 2007, defeating the rookie Cody Rhodes. This match initiated a brief "respect" feud between the two, with Holly defeating Rhodes on the next two episodes of Raw. On the October 22 episode of Raw, Holly turned face when he saved Rhodes from a post-match assault by Shelton Benjamin and Charlie Haas. Holly and Rhodes subsequently teamed up and emerged victorious in a tag team match against Benjamin and Haas the following week. Their teamwork led to a title opportunity when they defeated Paul London and Brian Kendrick and The Highlanders in a WWE.com exclusive match, courtesy of Holly's Alabama Slam. Holly and Rhodes, however, were unsuccessful in their challenge for the World Tag Team Championship at Survivor Series on November 18 against the reigning champions Lance Cade and Trevor Murdoch.

Despite this setback, on the December 10, 2007, episode of Raw during the brand’s 15th Anniversary show, Holly and Rhodes captured the World Tag Team Championship from Cade and Murdoch. The pair successfully defended their titles on multiple occasions, including matches against teams like Carlito and Santino Marella, and Paul London and Brian Kendrick.

At the Night of Champions event on June 29, 2008, Rhodes turned on Holly, teaming with Ted DiBiase to defeat Holly and claim the World Tag Team Championship. This marked Holly’s final WWE pay-per-view appearance. Following this, Holly took an extended hiatus from WWE television for seven months. He was released from his contract on January 16, 2009, after 15 years with the company, ending his lengthy tenure with WWE.

In the months preceding his release, Holly faced personal struggles, including a suspension due to a pain pill addiction. The incident that led to this suspension involved Holly being caught stealing painkillers from another wrestler’s bag, which resulted in his immediate placement in rehab.

=== Later career (2009–2019) ===
In May 2009, Holly traveled to England and wrestled for Varsity Pro Wrestling. On May 26, Holly defeated The UK Kid in a Tables, Ladders, and Chairs match during which he sustained a rib injury. Throughout mid-2009, Holly wrestled for National Wrestling Superstars, competing against wrestlers including Danny Demento, Salvatore Sincere, and D. J. Hyde. Holly then took a break from wrestling from 2010 until 2013.

On March 19, 2013, Holly, now bald and sporting a new tattoo, made a one night appearance for Total Nonstop Action Wrestling (TNA) as he took part in a six-man tag team match and teamed with James Storm and Magnus to defeat Aces & Eights (D.O.C., Wes Brisco, and Knux) at the TNA One Night Only event Hardcore Justice 2, which was aired on July 5, this was Holly's only match for TNA. Later that year he would wrestle for Southside Wrestling Entertainment and Preston City Wrestling in the U.K. and for Melbourne City Wrestling in Australia.

On May 7, 2016, Holly wrestled in the Netherlands for Pro Wrestling Showdown. Holly would also spend time in the UK, competing for PCW, Kamikaze Pro, Southside. Holly would also challenge Eddie Ryan for the Pro Wrestling Pride Heavyweight Championship, and Joseph Conners for the IPW:UK World Heavyweight Championship; however he would win neither championship.

Holly participated in a triple threat match against Cody Hall and Luke Hawx for the British WAW promotion on June 2, 2019. Although Holly did not announce a retirement afterwards, the match is his last known to date.

== Auto racing career ==
In 1992, Howard began auto racing in Mobile, Alabama at the Mobile International Speedway. Driving a 1974 Chevrolet Malibu, Howard placed fifth in the 1992 season and won the 1993 season.

In 1995, Howard began driving a World Wrestling Federation-sponsored super late model in the All Pro Series in an attempt at cross promotion. After the World Wrestling Federation (WWF) withdrew its sponsorship, WWF chairman Vince McMahon gifted the equipment to Howard.

== Other media ==
=== Filmography ===
Film
Year	Title	Role	Notes
2000	Operation Sandman	Sturner	Television film
2016	Thanks for Reading	The Reader	Short film

Television
Year	Title	Role	Notes
2005	MTV's The 70s House	Himself	Episode: "Dodge Ball"

=== Bibliography ===
- The Hardcore Truth: The Bob Holly Story (2013) (with Ross Williams)

== Personal life ==
Howard has a daughter named Stephanie from his first marriage. In 2009, Howard moved to Dubuque, Iowa as he reconnected with his high school girlfriend, Linda Kievet. Howard has been married to Kievet since 2010.

Howard's autobiography, titled The Hardcore Truth: The Bob Holly Story was released in the United States on April 1, 2013. Co-authored by former British wrestler Ross Owen Williams, an actor and writer who wrestled Holly in June 2010, it was published by ECW Press.

== Championships and accomplishments ==
- Kamikaze Pro
  - Kamikaze Pro Championship (1 time)
- Pro Wrestling Illustrated
  - PWI ranked him #41 of the top 500 best singles wrestlers in the PWI 500 in 2000
  - PWI ranked him #391 of the 500 best singles wrestlers of the PWI Years in 2003
- Under the Lights
  - UTL Lights Out Championship (1 time)
- World Wrestling Federation / World Wrestling Entertainment
  - NWA World Tag Team Championship (1 time) – with Bodacious Bart
  - WWF Hardcore Championship (6 times)
  - WWF/E World Tag Team Championship (3 times) – with The 1–2–3 Kid (1), Crash Holly (1), and Cody Rhodes (1)
  - WWF World Tag Team Championship Tournament (1995) – with The 1-2-3 Kid
- World Wrestling Organization
  - WWO United States Heavyweight Championship (1 time)
  - WWO Tag Team Championship (1 time) – with Ron Starr
