= 5 Star Wrestling =

British wrestling promotion

Pro Wrestling UK Ltd
- Acronym: 5 Star
- Founded: 2015
- Defunct: 20 March 2018
- Style: Professional wrestling Sports entertainment
- Headquarters: Scotland, United Kingdom
- Founder: Daniel Hinkles
- Website: 5 Star Wrestling

5 Star Wrestling (stylised as 5★ Wrestling) was a professional wrestling promotion based in Scotland. The company operated from 2015 to 2018 and promoted events throughout the United Kingdom and Ireland. They also produced a television series which was broadcast on FreeView television for the FreeSports channel. The company was established to focus on promoting live professional wrestling events, after sister company Serious Parody released the 5 Star Wrestling game for PlayStation 3.

== Overview ==
5 Star Wrestling's first event in September 2015 was similarly titled to that of their later video game 5 Star Wrestling: ReGenesis and saw John Morrison defeat Ricochet in a two out of three falls match in the main event. Morrison would then win the 5 Star Wrestling Championship defeating AJ Styles in Newcastle, and defending against Carlito, P. J. Black and retaining in a one-night 8-man tournament in the same month. The one-night 8-man tournament would be featured on Channel 5, under the name Dominant Wrestling: Live from Dundee.

After these events, 5 Star announced they would hold a 128-man tournament throughout 2017, and offered CM Punk $1 million (£770,000) to appear in the tournament, which he refused. The tournament would later be postponed until February 2018. Television channel FreeSports would pull out of a deal with Preston City Wrestling, to work with 5 Star to promote shows in 2018. In January 2018, 5 Star Wrestling held a press conference in Sheffield, promoting new shows through 2018. On 1 February 2018, 5 Star's debut on FreeSports, a new championship was established known as the "Tap Or Snap Title", which was won by Mark Haskins, winning a five-man elimination match for the championship. The event would also see Hager defeat Ryan, and John Morrison retain the 5* Championship over Rob Van Dam. A tag team title championship tournament was also established on this show, and later won by former Love Island contestant Adam Maxted, and partner Charlie Sterling.

In addition to their own championship titles, 5 Star also recognised and hosted matches for Southside Wrestling Heavyweight Championship and the Union of European Wrestling Alliances Cruiserweight Championship.

On 20 March 2018, 5 Star would announce on Twitter that they were to cancel upcoming shows; owing to the folding of their parent company "Pro Wrestling UK Ltd".

== Other media ==
5 Star Wrestling
- Developer: Serious Parody Ltd
- Publisher: Serious Parody Ltd
- Platform: PlayStation 3 (Original) PlayStation 4 (ReGenesis)
- Release: PlayStation 3: WW: 17 March 2015; PlayStation 4: WW: 20 January 2016
- Genres: Simulation, Parody
- Modes: Single-player, Multi-player

=== Video games ===
Originally announced in 2013, 5 Star Wrestling was released for PlayStation 3 in 2015, developed and published by sister company Serious Parody. An updated version called 5 Star Wrestling: ReGenesis was released on PlayStation 4 20 January 2016, exclusively on PlayStation Network. The game featured parodied versions of famous wrestlers, such as "HarVee Dee", as RVD.

The game cites having "true ring psychology", "Heel and Face mechanics, a revolutionary Limb Damage System and Rivalries that impact gameplay." The game features a 40-hour Challenge campaign with 128 challenges, over 400 objectives, and "more moves-per-wrestler than any other game." The game also features a unique "finisher-to-finisher" reversal system, which allows finishers to be countered immediately into a finisher for the opponent under certain circumstances.

As well as featuring parodies on many wrestlers, the game also featured many parodies of music, arenas and tropes of professional wrestling games.

=== Reception ===
Reception

Review scores
Publication	Score
PlayStation Official Magazine – UK	20% (PS3)
Push Square	3/10 (PS3)
PlayStation Universe	60% (PS3)
Bonus Stage	7/10 (PS4)

The original 5 Star Wrestling game received mixed reception from critics. APG Nation gave the game 8/10 stating that "The damage system deserves praise on so many levels." Push Square gave the game 3/10, refuting the game by saying "As it stands, without any online functionality, no creation suite, a litigious gaggle of performers, and dodgy mechanics, this game is all but impossible to recommend to anyone." The Official PlayStation magazine was even harsher, giving the game only 20%. PlayStation Universe were less harsh, however, rating the game 60% saying "5 Star Wrestling delivers a clever and refreshing take on the genre in the ring, but is massively hampered by its mountain of drawbacks and flaws outside of it. Fight your way through that and there's a satisfying depiction of how wrestling works waiting to be discovered."

The improved version 5 Star Wrestling: ReGenesis, received better critical response. Bonus Stage reviewed the PS4 game and gave the game 7/10, saying: "despite issues... 5 Star Wrestling remains very difficult to dislike". however, they acknowledge the amount of bugs citing "despite some obvious visual improvements and ironing out of many of its forebear's more prominent bugs, 5 Star Wrestling is still an inherently ugly video game."

== Championships ==
=== 5 Star Wrestling Championship ===
Key
No.	Overall reign number
Reign	Reign number for the specific champion
Days	Number of days held

No.	Champion	Championship change			Reign statistics		Notes	Ref.
No.	Champion	Date	Event	Location	Reign	Days	Notes	Ref.
1	John Morrison	13 January 2016	UK Tour	Newcastle upon Tyne, England	1	757	Defeated A.J. Styles to become the inaugural champion.	
2	Jake Hager	8 February 2018	Live From Newcastle	Newcastle, Tyne And Wear, England, UK	1	40		
—	Deactivated	20 March 2018	—	—	—	—	Deactivated when the promotion closed down	

=== 5 Star Tap or Snap Championship ===
Key
No.	Overall reign number
Reign	Reign number for the specific champion
Days	Number of days held

No.	Champion	Championship change			Reign statistics		Notes	Ref.
No.	Champion	Date	Event	Location	Reign	Days	Notes	Ref.
1	Mark Haskins	1 February 2018	Live From Liverpool	Liverpool, England	1	21	Haskins defeated BT Gunn, Joey Axl, Morgan Webster and Nathan Cruz in a Five Way Elimination Match to become Inaugural champion.	
2	Matt Riddle	22 February 2018	Live In Plymouth	Plymouth, England	1	26		
—	Deactivated	20 March 2018	—	—	—	—	Deactivated when the promotion closed down	

=== 5 Star Tag Team Championship ===
No.	Champion	Reign	Date	Days held	Location	Event	Notes	Ref.
1	Max Money (Adam Maxted & Charlie Sterling)	1	8 February 2018	40	Newcastle, England	Live From Newcastle	Defeated El Ligero and Jody Fleisch in a tournament final to win the titles.	
—	Deactivated	—	20 March 2018	—	—	—	Deactivated when the promotion closed down	

=== Real Wrestling Championship ===
No.	Champion	Reign	Date	Days held	Location	Event	Notes	Ref
1	Eddie Ryan	1	1 March 2018	19	Belfast, Northern Ireland	Live In Belfast	Defeated Zack Gibson to become Inaugural champion.	
—	Deactivated	—	20 March 2018	—	—	—	Deactivated when the promotion closed down	

== See also ==
- Professional wrestling
- List of professional wrestling promotions in Great Britain and Ireland
