= Eddie Ryan =

British professional wrestler (born 1985)

Personal information
- Born: Vincent Rubio; 5 November 1985 (age 41) Plymouth, Devon, England

Professional wrestling career
- Ring name(s): Edouardo Reyes; Eddie Reyes; Eddie Ryan; Tony Bauer
- Billed height: 6 ft 2 in (1.88 m)
- Billed weight: 225 lb (102 kg)
- Billed from: Plymouth, England
- Debut: 31 January 2009

Vincent Rubio (born 5 November 1985), better known by the ring name Eddie Ryan, is a British professional wrestler currently active in the United Kingdom. Rubio, originally from Plymouth, England, started his in ring career in 2008 at the 4 Front Wrestling (4FW) training school. His first match was in January of the following year for 4FW under the ring name Eddie Reyes, being given the gimmick of a Spanish wrestler. Before representing England overseas in Japan and the United States, Rubio changed his ring name to Eddie Ryan, with an English gimmick.

In 2018, Rubio first appeared on national television channel FreeSports for 5 Star Wrestling, and later as a part of the NXT UK brand of World Wrestling Entertainment. Ryan is a twenty-time heavyweight champion, and held nine tag team championships with his partner Jason Larusso, as a part of “The Lionhearts”, Charlie Sterling as a part of "Crazy Teacups", & Joel Redman as a part of “The Professionals”.

== Early life ==
Rubio grew up in Plymouth, England. As a teenager, Rubio played football until his final year of university and watched professional wrestling. He graduated from Plymouth University with a Bachelor of Arts in business administration in 2008. Afterward, he moved to Swindon to train to become a professional wrestler.

== Professional wrestling career ==
=== Early career (2008–2011) ===
Rubio started his professional wrestling career in 2008 by training at the 4 Front Wrestling (4FW) Training School. He had his first professional match in January of the following year at 4FW New Year’s Wrestlution under the name of Eddie Reyes, with the gimmick of a Spanish wrestler. Rubio competed in a five-way ladder match Money in the bank, featuring Mark Sloan, Wade Fitzgerald, Mark Haskins and won by Dave Sharp. Rubio wrestled predominantly for 4FW during his first year, but made his debut for Pro Evolution Wrestling (Pro EVW) in July with a loss to Jack Dynamo. He gained his first championship match by the end of the year in a battle royale at the 4FW Halloween Spectacular 2009, but lost the match for the 4FW Heavyweight Championship again to Jack Dynamo a full year after his debut in January 2010.

Rubio continued with his work in 4FW and Pro EVW, but also branched out into new territories in 2010, with matches in Welsh Wrestling and XWA. He made his first appearance outside of the UK, wrestling for the Nordic Championship Wrestling Cruiser weight Championship in Hamburg, Germany. Rubio had his final match as "The Spanish Sensation" Eddie Reyes in June 2011 at 4FW Steel Cage Warfare, in a loss to Joel Redman. So he could represent England, Rubio changed his gimmick to being English, and his ring-name to Eddie Ryan. Rubio competed in six matches in the United States, including a losing effort for the vacant Power League Wrestling Heavyweight Championship. Rubio also competed in the Korakuen Hall in Tokyo, Japan, where he won a tag team match for Pro Wrestling Zero1.

=== The Lionhearts and 4FW Champion (2012–2015) ===
In February 2012, Rubio returned to England from Japan, and won his first professional championship in a ten-man ladder match. He defended the championship against the likes of Sha Samuels, Benham Ali and Dave Mastiff before losing the championship to Samuels in March 2013; holding the championship for over a year. During this time, he also returned to his home town of Plymouth for the Plymouth Wrestling Alliance (PWA). Before the end of 2013, Ryan won the 4FW Championship back in a 2-on-1 Handicap match.

Ryan start tagging with Jason Larusso, creating the tag team "The Lionhearts". Throughout 2013, the team received four tag team championship matches, for the Pro EVW, Alternate Wrestling World, Pro Wrestling Pride (PWP) and Michinoko Pro Wrestling tag team championships, however they lost all of them. In late 2014, they won the 4FW Tag Team Championship by defeating The Hunter Brothers.

Whilst holding the 4FW Heavyweight Championship, Ryan become the number one contender for the PWA Heavyweight Championship, and on 5 March 2014 Ryan won the PWA Heavyweight Championship from Chris Marvel on the company's 5th anniversary show. He defended the championship multiple times, defeating John Harding, Danny Walsh, and Robbie E. Ryan held the championship for an entire year, before losing at the 6th anniversary show, to Danny Walsh.

Focusing on both tag team and singles wrestling, The Lionhearts won their second tag team championship, this time the Pro Wrestling Pride Tag Team Championship, besting old nemesis Danny Walsh, and brother Mark Walsh. They became double champions after winning a four-team gauntlet match to regain the 4FW Tag Team Championship. The team lost the Pride Tag Team Championship two months after winning them back to Mark Walsh, and his new partner, Tyler Hawke.

=== Singles success and TNA Heavyweight Championship match (2016) ===
Ryan started 2016 by competing in a tournament to crown the first 4FW South East Champion, where he lost to JD Knight in the final. In February, he lost the 4FW Tag Championship with partner Jason Larusso, effectively ending the team. Ryan then focused primarily on singles competition and received wins against Chris Dickinson, Kelly Sixx and Joshua Knott, before winning the 3rd Annual PWP Prizefighters Tournament, defeating Lomaxx in the final and gaining a PWP Heavyweight Championship opportunity. He was unsuccessful at PWP Pride & Glory 2016, but he won the championship at the next show, PWP One of a kind, besting Steve Griffiths in Taunton, England.

As champion, Ryan successfully defended the championship against Hardcore Holly at PWP Heroes and Legends 3, as well as wins over Chris Andrews, Danny Jones and Chuck Cyrus. He lost the championship in an elimination six-pack challenge to Bram, due to interference from the "House of Bones" tag team, Gideon and Lomaxx. Ryan got revenge by winning a tag team match against the House of Bones, partnering James Storm. In August, Ryan won his fourth heavyweight championship, defeating JD Knight for the South East Professional Wrestling Heavyweight Championship in Kent.

Ryan continued working for Plymouth Wrestling Association, and on 17 April he won a number one contenders match for the TNA Heavyweight Championship against Drew Galloway. Ryan lost the championship match at the company's 7th anniversary show. Ryan also challenged for the PWA Heavyweight Championship against Tyler Hawke, but did not successfully win the championship.

=== Heavyweight and tournament success (2017) ===
In January, Ryan had his first Ultimate Pro Wrestling championship opportunity, where he lost to Lestyn Rees. He also challenged for new championships, including the Pro Wrestling PWP Catch Division Championship against Joshua Knott, and the King Of Chaos Championship, in a seven-man match, losing on both occasions. He won the Pride Prizefighters tournament for the second time in a row, however, he lost the corresponding championship match again, losing in a fatal-4-way to Bram.

Ryan had success in Pro Wrestling Chaos during the year, with wins over Rampage Brown, Dick Riley, Mikey Whiplash, and wrestled Tommy Dreamer and Paul London. In July, Ryan unsuccessfully challenged for the Ironfist Wrestling Heavyweight Championship, losing to Mark Haskins. He returned to the company in September, to attempt the Mount Olympus Challenge, a seven-man match, won by Max Alexander. In March, Ryan won his second one-night tournament, where he won the Plymouth Wrestling Association Trail to Prevail tournament. This led to him besting Robin Lekime for the PWA Heavyweight championship on 30 April. He then defended the championship against Lekime twice more, winning the final encounter 3–2 in a 30-minute Iron Man match at Heat Wave II.

Ryan twice battled for the Ultimate Pro Wrestling championship number one contendership; on 9 September 2017 he lost a triple threat match to Josh Bodom (also including Ryan Smile), and also lost a singles match to Bodom on 20 October. On 28 October Ryan had his first singles match for the Pro Wrestling Chaos championship, losing to Eddie Dennis. Ryan finished out the year wrestling for Ultimate Pro Wrestling, and in Big League Wrestling, losing to Chris Andrews.

=== 5 Star Wrestling (2018) ===
In late 2017, Ryan was named a member of the roster for the 5 Star Wrestling tour in 2018, also featuring Rob Van Dam, Rey Mysterio and Jack Hager, that was broadcast on FreeSports. Following this Rubio announced that he was to be wrestling full-time, quitting his job as a Data Analyst. During a press conference before the tour, a kayfabe fight between Hager and Ryan occurred over Hager's disrespectful attitude against British wrestlers, where Hager stated that British wrestlers "don’t matter. Ryan was defeated by Hager in the Echo Arena, on the first night of the tour in the main event on 1 February 2018, on 5 Star Wrestling's debut on FreeSports.

On 22 February Ryan made a public challenge to Hager, who was now the 5 Star Champion, for a championship match. The event saw Ryan's challenge be met by Hager, but only if Ryan could win a "five-star gauntlet match", winning against five wrestlers in a row. Ryan defeated Markus Burke, and then HT Drake, before defeating Tim Wyde by disqualification, after interference from Hager. Ryan was then forced to take on Dave Mastiff and old rival "Big Grizzly" Steve Griffiths in a two-on-one handicap match, which he also won. After the match, Ryan was rewarded a championship match against Hager in that evening's main event, which he lost after outside interference from Bram. In March 2018, 5 Star Wrestling folded, however, on the last broadcast, Ryan won the newly created 5 Star Wrestling: Real Championship from Zack Gibson, in Belfast.

=== NXT UK (2018) ===
Ryan made his debut for World Wrestling Entertainment under the NXT UK brand on 13 October 2018, where he competed and won in the Plymouth Pavilions. The following night, Ryan competed in a losing effort against Fabian Aichner.

== Personal life ==
Rubio is a supporter of Plymouth Argyle FC.

== Professional wrestling persona ==
Originally portraying as a Spanish gimmick, Rubio wrestled under the name of Eddie Reyes, using a sitout scoop slam piledriver to win matches, known as the España Slam. Later, after his character changed nationality, Rubio utilised a superkick to win matches; being referred to as "The English Lion". Along with his name, Ryan would often wear a gladiatorial cape to the ring; or if wrestling in Plymouth, a Plymouth Argyle football shirt. In 2018, for 5 Star Wrestling, Rubio used a running crucifix powerbomb known as the George Cross to finish matches, a move name designed to utilise his place as a babyface representing the country.

== Championships and accomplishments ==
- 5 Star Wrestling
  - 5 Star Wrestling: Real Championship (1 time, inaugural, final)
  - 5 Star Wrestling: Real Championship Tournament (2018)
- 4 Front Wrestling
  - 4FW Heavyweight Championship (2 times)
  - 4FW Tag Team Championship (2 times) – with Jason Larusso
- Alternative Wrestling World
  - AWW Tag Team Championship (1 time) – with Jason Larusso
- British Kingdom Pro-Wrestling
  - Brit King Pro Championship (1 time)
- Combat Sports Federation
  - CSF All-Nations Heavyweight Championship (2 time, current)
- Elite Wrestling Entertainment
  - EWE Heavyweight Championship (1 time)
  - EWE Heavyweight Title Tournament (2019)
- Full Force Wrestling
  - FFW British Heavyweight Championship (2 times)
- Grandslam Wrestling
  - GSW Tag Team Championship (current)
- Plymouth Wrestling Alliance/Association
  - PWA Heavyweight Championship (3 times, final)
  - PWA Trail to Prevail Tournament (1 time)
- Pro Wrestling Chaos
  - PWC Knights of Chaos Championship (2 times) - with Charlie Sterling
- Pro Wrestling Pride
  - PWP Heavyweight Championship (1 time)
  - Prizefighters Champion (2 times) – 2016, 2017
  - PWP Tag Team Championship (1 time) – with Jason Larusso
- Reach Wrestling
  - Reach Heavyweight Championship (2 times)
- South East Professional Wrestling
  - SEPW Heavyweight Championship (1 time)
- Strike Wrestling
  - Strike Heavyweight Championship (2 times)
- South West Wrestling
  - SWW Heavyweight Championship (2 times)
  - SWW Tag Team Championship (2 times) - with Joel Redman
- Ultimate Pro Wrestling
  - UPW World Heavyweight Championship (1 time)
  - UPW Undisputed Heavyweight Championship (1 time)
