= Christopher Andrew =

Christopher Andrew may refer to:

- Christopher Andrew (historian) (born 1941), Cambridge University historian
- Rob Andrew (born 1963), Christopher Robert "Rob" Andrew, English rugby union player

== See also ==
- Christopher Andrews (disambiguation)
