= Christopher Andrews =

Christopher Andrews may refer to:

- Christopher Columbus Andrews (1829–1922), American brigadier general
- Christopher Andrews (writer) (born 1970), American actor and writer; see Living Dead
- Christopher Andrews (singer) (born 1942), English-German singer-songwriter
- Christopher Andrews (editor) on Joey (1986 film)

== See also ==
- Christopher Andrewes (1896–1988), British virologist
- Chris Andrews (disambiguation)
- Christopher Andrew (disambiguation)
