= PWP Catch Division Championship =

Wrestling competition

Details
- Promotion: Pro Wrestling Pride (PWP)
- Date established: May 13, 2012
- Current champion: Tyler Hawke
- Date won: June 25, 2017
Statistics
- First champion: Stevie Jones
- Most reigns: Stevie Jones/Tyler Hawke and Ultimo Tiger (4 reigns)
- Longest reign: Tyler Hawke (3,224+ days)
- Shortest reign: Bobbi Tyler (1 day)
- Heaviest champion: Josef von Schmidt 260 lbs (118 kg)

The PWP Catch Division Championship is a professional wrestling championship owned by Pro Wrestling Pride. It was the first championship incorporated by Pro Wrestling Pride, and the company's second-tier championship behind the PWP Heavyweight Championship. Despite the championship being the secondary championship for the promotion, it has been known to main-event shows above the heavyweight championship.

The championship was established on the first Pro Wrestling Pride show under the company's banner on 13 May 2012, where Tyler Hawke defeated Wales' 'Wild Boar' Mike Hitchman. The design of the championship is that of a trophy rather than a traditional championship belt. Despite the championship being predominantly male, it has been won by a female. Bobbi Tyler won the championship for a single day in January 2017.

== Catch Division Wrestling ==
Rather than a midcard title based on a weight (Such as All Japan Pro Wrestling's Junior Heavyweight Championship, or World Championship Wrestling's Cruiserweight championship), and is more in line with Total Nonstop Action Wrestling's X-Division Championship, which stated the division was 'not about weight limits, it's about no limits!" The catch division, was likely originally designed as a showcase of catch wrestling, rather than high-flying wrestling, with well known grapplers Johnny Kidd and Doug Williams winning the title.

However, the style has changed over the duration of the belt's life, with the aforementioned catch style, with a mix of luchador, Puroresu and even more 'extreme styles'. This is reflected in the match types contested for this championship, with "catch as catch can" wrestling style (See Mountevans Rules), Luchas de Apuestas and even TLC matches. The division's prize was a catch division trophy, and not a traditional belt.

== Title history ==
The full history of the championship is listed below. As the championship is currently on hiatus; the current championship reign of Tyler Hawke is being accumulated; however, it may not be accurate.

Key
| No. | Overall reign number |
| Reign | Reign number for the specific champion |
| Days | Number of days held |
| Defenses | Number of successful defenses |
| + | Current reign is changing daily |

| No. | Champion | Championship change | | | Reign statistics | | | Notes | Ref. |
| No. | Champion | Date | Event | Location | Reign | Days | Defenses | Notes | Ref. |
|---|---|---|---|---|---|---|---|---|---|
| 1 | Stevie Jones | May 13, 2012 | PWP Debut Show | Teignmouth, England | 1 | 105 | 2 | Defeated Mike Hitchman to become the inaugural champion. | |
| 2 | Josef von Schmidt | August 26, 2012 | House show | Teignmouth, England | 1 | 245 | 1 | | |
| 3 | Darren Saviour | April 28, 2013 | House show | Teignmouth, England | 1 | 126 | 3 | | |
| 4 | Tyler Hawke | September 1, 2013 | House show | Exeter, England | 2 | 258 | 2 | Previously held the title under the name Stevie Jones. | |
| 5 | Ultimo Tiger | May 17, 2014 | Pride & Glory 2014 | Torquay, England | 1 | 36 | 0 | This was a Title vs Mask "I Quit" match. | |
| 6 | Dick Riley | June 22, 2014 | House show | Saltash, England | 1 | 105 | 3 | | |
| 7 | Joel Redman | October 5, 2014 | Hardcore Halloween | Exeter, England | 1 | 49 | 0 | | |
| 8 | Tyler Hawke | November 23, 2014 | House show | Torquay, England | 3 | 84 | 1 | This was a Three Stages of Hell match. | |
| 9 | Ultimo Tiger | February 15, 2015 | House show | Newton Abbot, England | 2 | 168 | 5 | | |
| 10 | Doug Williams | August 2, 2015 | Big Trouble in Little Tavi | Tavistock, England | 1 | 14 | 1 | Cashed in his "Money In The Bank" contract. | |
| 11 | Ultimo Tiger | August 16, 2015 | Too Legit To Quit | Taunton, England | 3 | 175 | 5 | | |
| 12 | Scotty Essex | February 7, 2016 | The Real Rock 'N' Rollas | Plymouth, England | 1 | 98 | 0 | This was a three-way match also involving Tajiri. | |
| 13 | Johnny Kidd | May 15, 2016 | The Battle of Bideford | Bideford, England | 1 | 7 | 0 | | |
| 14 | Scotty Essex | May 22, 2016 | Johnny Kidd's Last Devon Stand | Teignmouth, England | 2 | 49 | 0 | This was a Mountevans match. | |
| 15 | Ultimo Tiger | July 10, 2016 | Heroes & Legends 3 | Paignton, England | 4 | 112 | 5 | This was a four-way match also involving Mark Andrews & PJ Black. | |
| 16 | Kelly Sixx | October 30, 2016 | Undisputed 2 | Taunton, England | 4 | 89 | 1 | This was a three-way Tables, Ladders, and Chairs match also involving Joshua Knott. | |
| 17 | Bobbi Tyler | January 27, 2017 | Maximum Mayhem | Taunton, England | 1 | 1 | 0 | First female wrestler to hold the title. | |
| 18 | Joshua Knott | January 28, 2017 | Maximum Mayhem | Bideford, England | 1 | 148 | 1 | | |
| 19 | Tyler Hawke | June 25, 2017 | Live In Plymouth | Plymouth, England | 4 | 3,224+ | 2 | This was a street fight match. | |

== Combined reigns ==
The total list of combined championship days held as of April 23, 2026:

| † | Indicates the current champion |

| Rank | Wrestler | No. of reigns | Combined days |
|---|---|---|---|
| 1 | Stevie Jones/Tyler Hawke † | 4 | 3,671+ |
| 2 | Ultimo Tiger | 4 | 491 |
| 3 | Josef von Schmidt | 1 | 245 |
| 4 | Joshua Knott | 1 | 148 |
| 5 | Scotty Essex | 2 | 147 |
| 6 | Darren Saviour | 1 | 126 |
| 7 | Dick Riley | 1 | 105 |
| 8 | Kelly Sixx | 1 | 89 |
| 9 | Joel Redman | 1 | 49 |
| 10 | Doug Williams | 1 | 14 |
| 11 | Johnny Kidd | 1 | 7 |
| 12 | Bobbi Tyler | 1 | 1 |

== See also ==
- Catchweight
- List of professional wrestling promotions in the Great Britain and Ireland
- Pro Wrestling Pride
