= British Kingdom Pro-Wrestling =

- Acronym: Brit King Pro
- Founded: 2004
- Style: Professional wrestling; Sports entertainment; Puroresu
- Headquarters: United Kingdom
- Owner: Dave Sharp
- Website: BritishKingdomPro.com

British Kingdom Pro-Wrestling previously 4 Front Wrestling (Sometimes acronymed as 4FW) is a pro wrestling company based in the South West of England, established in 2004 by Dave Sharp. Since 2004, the company has promoted a range of shows; utilising events through England, primarily in the Swindon and Oxford areas.

== Style and partners ==
4FW is well known for its use of United Kingdom wrestlers, but also its partners with international promotions. The promotion has a high puroresu vibe, and has had its own wrestlers appear in Japan and Mexico. The company has a working relationship with Michinoku Pro wrestling, as well as Wrestle-1. It is also a regular occurrence for high-profile wrestlers from Japan and United States of America to have one-off matches in the company. 4FW also has a 'Junior Heavyweight' Championship, which is common in Japan, rather than a more traditional cruiserweight, or light heavyweight in the rest of the world.

== Synopsis ==
4FWs first show was held at Pinehurst People's Centre in 2005 'and so it begins' They had opened a wrestling school held at Cheney Manor, training wrestler's such as Saime Sahin, Tiger Ali and Eddie Ryan. In 2011, Owner and Promoter Dave Sharp retired from Pro Wrestling due to neck injuries, which lead to the promotion running more events.

Perhaps 4FWs most well known was 4FW Ultimate Supremacy 2015 which held an event featuring recently released from WWE Wrestlers Rey Mysterio against Alberto Del Rio in the main event. The event brought around 1,000 fans into Swindon for the event held in Swindon MECCA. 4FW also has an on-demand video service for all of its previous shows library in the same vein as the WWE Network on Powerbomb TV.

4FW has also reached out to new fans by using other international talent such as Cody Rhodes, however, Rhodes was unable to make the show, so Kenny Omega took his place in the match, flying from Japan to the UK for the match against Tiger Ali.

== Junior Heavyweight Championship ==
During its tenure, 4FW has had a number of notable Junior Heavyweight Champions. Due to the unique nature of the championship, it has been defended in Hong Kong and Japan. The championship was first won by Gino in July 2006, winning an 8-man tournament and who held the championship for 91 days, before losing the belt to El Ligero. Ligero would lose the championship to Ashley Reed, before being vacated (presumed forever), until its reintroduction in 2010.

The championship would be now won by Dave Sharp himself defeating Benham Ali in 2010. He would lose the championship to Owen Phoenix who would hold it for a record 731 days (Two years). The championship would be won by Jason Larusso, Benham Ali, and Pete Dunne until 2013. Dunne would hold the championship for almost half a year. Kenbai would defeat Dunne for the gold at Ultimate Supremacy 2013, and would defend the belt against Hiromu Takahashi, Taro Nohashi for Michinoku Pro in Japan and Ho Ho Lun in Hong Kong, before being won by Ken45. The title would later be returned to the company, when Tiger Ali won the championship during a tour of Japan.

Owen Phoenix would return to wrestling, after an absence and win the championship back, and hold it for 167 days, holding the championship for a total of 898 days. At the start of 2015, the former Tiger Mask; Koji Kanemoto, would defeat Phoenix for the title, but would later have to vacate the championship. Kenny Omega and Mark Haskins would battle for the vacant championship at 4FW New Years Wrestleution 2016, with Omega winning the vacant championship. He would hold the championship shortly; and vacate the belt after, stating that he was not a Junior Heavyweight, an angle that he had been working in New Japan Pro-Wrestling. To date, Omega is still undefeated in 4FW, with 5 wins from 5.

Less than a month later, Haskins would win the championship, this time defeating P. J. Black, but would have to vacate the championship himself due to nagging injuries. Bubblegum would then win the vacant championship against Mega Pegasus in Swindon on 21 January 2017. The final show as 4FW happened in February 2020 before rebranding as British Kingdom Pro-Wrestling in 2023.

== Championships ==
Championship	Champion(s)	Previous	Date won	Days	Reference
Brit King Pro Heavyweight Championship	Chris Bronson	Eddie Ryan	21 June 2025	399+	
Brit King Pro Junior Heavyweight Championship	Brian Kendrick	Prince Phoenix	26 October 2025	272+	

== See also ==
- Professional Wrestling
- List of professional wrestling promotions in the Great Britain and Ireland
