= Clint Evans (rower) =

Ocean rower

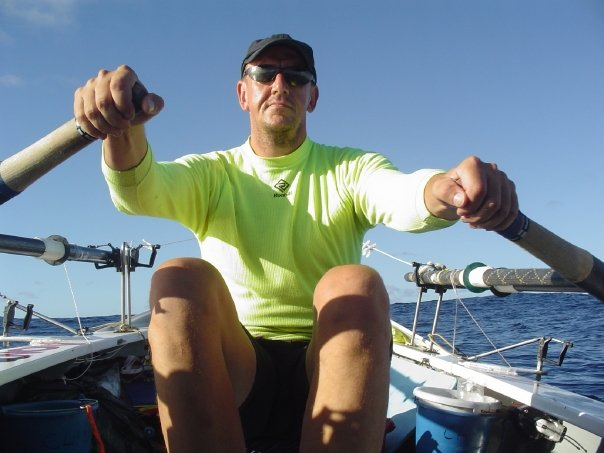
Clint Evans – Ocean Rower

Clint Evans (born 9 April 1961) is an ocean rower and winner of the 2005 Atlantic Rowing Race with his partner Chris Andrews in their boat C^{2} – the first British crew to win the Atlantic Rowing Race..

Evans is a strategy and business performance consultant, mentor and coach. He is the former chief executive officer of Barlow Lyde & Gilbert – an international law firm, Director of Brand and Talent at major law firm Reynolds Porter Chamberlain, and a former Director at Henley Management College. He was educated at Emanuel School in Battersea, London, and rowed for Great Britain at U23 Level and for Wales. He is the owner and managing director of SOS Consulting.
