= Chris Andrews (rower) =

British rower and ocean rower

Chris Andrews (born 4 March 1961) is an ocean rower and winner of the 2005 Atlantic Rowing Race with his partner Clint Evans in their boat C^{2} – the first British crew to win the Atlantic Rowing Race.

Andrews is the former director of risk management of Clifford Chance – an international law firm and a former director at Ernst & Young. He was educated at Latymer Upper School in Hammersmith, London and Reading University, where he studied law. He rowed for Great Britain at World Championship Level in 1989 (Bled, Yugoslavia) and 1990 (Lake Barrington, Tasmania), in both years in the men's quadruple scull. He is the director of risk and compliance at the law firm Pinsent Masons LLP.
