= Pro Wrestling Pride =

- Acronym: PWP
- Founded: 2012
- Defunct: 2017
- Style: Professional wrestling Sports entertainment
- Headquarters: United Kingdom
- Founder: Darren Ferguson
- Owner: Darren Ferguson
- Website: prowrestlingpride.com

Pro Wrestling Pride (sometimes referred to as Pride Promotions, or simply PWP) was a pro wrestling company based in the South West of England, established in 2012 by professional wrestler Darren 'Saviour' Ferguson. Since its inception in 2012 until its demise in 2017, the company promoted a range of shows; utilizing events through South West England, and occasionally in wider Europe.

== Style ==
The promotion was well known for its liberal use of United Kingdom-based wrestlers, and international stars (Such as Jim Duggan, Mr. Anderson and Rob Van Dam). The style of the events could be best described as traditional sports entertainment, with events designed to be 'fun for all ages', suitable for families, as opposed to the more 'extreme' or alternative style which is marketed at older viewers (See Extreme Championship Wrestling.)

== Catch Division Wrestling ==
The company was also different from other similar wrestling company's for its 'catch division' championship. Rather than a midcard title based on a weight (Such as All Japan Pro Wrestling's Junior Heavyweight Championship, or World Championship Wrestling's Cruiserweight championship), and was more in line with Total Nonstop Action Wrestling's X-Division Championship; which stated the division was 'not about weight limits, it's about no limits!" The catch division, was likely originally designed as a showcase of catch wrestling; rather than high-flying wrestling, with well known grapplers Johnny Kidd (wrestler) and Doug Williams winning the title.

The style however, changed over the duration of the belt's longevity; with the aforementioned catch style, with a mix of luchador, Puroresu and even more 'extreme styles'. This was reflected in the match types contested for this championship; with "catch as catch can" wrestling style (See Mountevans Rules), Luchas de Apuestas and even TLC matches. The division's prize was a catch division trophy, and not a traditional belt.

== History ==
=== Formation ===
Pride was founded in 2012 by Darren Ferguson. Having been an independent wrestler since 2009 under the ring name 'Darren Saviour' wanted to create a brand of pro wrestling for the South West of England. The name of the company was designed not to be territorial, and thus given the name Pride; in direct comparison to the local companies Devon Wrestling Association, and Plymouth Wrestling Alliance/Association.

The company's first show was actually not an official production under the Pro Wrestling Pride banner. It was a mixed boxing and professional wrestling show based in the Plymouth Guildhall named 'Plymouth Prizefighters 2'. The event was not advertised as a Pride event; however the event was agreed as cannon in the company's history as it was featured on the company's YouTube channel and could be considered a pilot episode. The 'Prizefighters' name would go on to be used for the company's annual knockout tournament (See "Early Years")

The first show advertised under the Pro Wrestling Pride name took place on 13 May 2012, in Fergusson's home town of Teignmouth; which featured the company's first championship match; with Tyler Hawke besting 'Wild Boar' Mike Hitchman for the PWP Catch Division Championship. It was also notable for local Devon wrestler Joel Redman having his last match in the UK on the show before signing with WWE under the NXT brand. Redman would later return to the UK in 2015 having been the first NXT Tag Team Champions with partner Adrian Neville.

=== Early Years (2012-14) ===
PWP would run two more shows in 2012, the events taking place in the Carlton Theatre, Teignmouth. These events would take place on the 25/26 August weekend; and would feature US based wrestler Josef Von Schmidt. Schmidt would defeat Tyler Hawke for the championship during the weekender, and defend the championship in the United States against A. R. Fox. The PWP Heavyweight Championship was also established, won by Crediton wrestler Chris Andrews in a fatal-4 Way Match.

In 2013, the company would branch out to new towns, cities and venues. Running shows in Exeter (Exeter Corn Exchange) establishing the PWP Tag Team Championships, Totnes (Totnes Civic Hall), featuring the company's first No Disqualification Match - With a Texas Tornado Tag Team Match and Torquay (Town Hall.)

This trend would continue through 2014; with the 'adrenaline rush' tour, with three new locations in three days; before the brand's first venture outside of Devon. The show was to take place in Saltash, Cornwall, and would be the first instance of the annual 'Prize Fighters' Tournament, an 8-person Single-elimination tournament in the span of one night; reminiscent of the King Of The Ring Tournament.

May 2014 had to date the company's only Luchas de Apuestas match; with a championship vs mask "I Quit" match for the Catch Division Trophy. However, the match ended with a traditional title change, and not an unmasking. The match would take place at 'Pride and Glory 2014', an event that has marked the company's spiritual anniversary every year, if not its chronological anniversary.

Before the end of 2014, Pride held an event featuring former Extreme Championship Wrestling alumnus Raven, promoting the show as the stars final event in the UK. At the time, the star had not wrestled for over a year, and had considered retiring. Raven would actually return to Pride two year later; having only wrestled in the United States in between.

=== Heroes and Legends ===
Late in 2014, Pride would return to Saltash, and promote a match between then Catch Division Champion Dick Riley, and Ring Of Honor Television Champion Jay Lethal for both championships. Despite neither championship changing hands, this is the first instance of an outside championship being defended on a Pride wrestling event. This would be followed by a TNA Tag Team Championships Match in 2015, with The American Wolves defending.

With the size of crowds escalating, the next project had been conceived; known as 'Heroes & Legends' (Sometimes shortened to ""H&L", an event with multiple high-profile wrestling stars, and WWE Hall Of Fame members. Featuring Rockstar Spud, Chris Masters, Roderick Strong & Jim Duggan the event was a success; with over 800 in attendance, over double the size of any Pride crowd before it. The event also saw multiple time TNA World Heavyweight Champion Mr. Anderson win the Pride Heavyweight Championship, although he would lose the championship four weeks later in Truro.

With the success of "H&L"; the second titled show was designed for later that year. This event featured a main event of Rhyno against Steve Griffiths for the championship, as well as a plethora of talent, including Hall Of Famer Ted DiBiase. The event would catch on, and become a bi-annual event.

=== Growth, Hiatus & Eventual Demise (2016-2017) ===
Towards the end of 2015, Pride would do its first show outside of Devon or Cornwall, where they would appear in Taunton, Somerset; which would then hold three shows in January with Kenny Omega (who would be awarded a 5-star match by Pro Wrestling Illustrated that year) and WWE Hall of Famer Tatanka, July featuring Rob Van Dam in front of over 800 people, and in October with Adam Rose Pride would promote 25 shows in the year of 2016, despite taking the month of November off. Pride would also introduce a female only championship; with Nadia Sapphire winning the Pride Women's Championship in October 2016.

However, despite crowd attendances growing and United Kingdom wrestling being its strongest since the 1980s, increasing competition and heightened number of events required more events to feature international wrestlers than ever before. This in turn affected Pride and in September 2017, the company fell into hiatus as owner Darren Ferguson placed the company in a state of hiatus owing to debts surrounding the shows. Despite saying that he would be "closing down all future live events", he has also stated that the company would start up again once issues had been resolved.

The company's last shows before the hiatus included a three-day tour with shows in Taunton, Launceston and Plymouth, with the last being the 5th iteration of the Heroes and Legends event. These shows included guest appearances from Simon Gotch, Carlito and Joey Ryan.

== International Events ==
Despite being a regional touring product; based in the South West of England, Pride promoted shows in Europe outside of the UK. The first of these, being the 2015 international Brussels Tattoo Convention, and then again in February 2016 taking a team to co-promote two shows in Lisbon based Centro De Treinos De Wrestling. The team they would take included regular Pride members Saviour himself, Jigsaw, Ultimo Tiger, Cy Gregory and even Senior Referee Ed Dyer.

== Championships and accomplishments ==
=== Pro Wrestling Pride Championship ===
- Final Champion: Bram

=== Pro Wrestling Pride Catch Division Championship ===
- Final champion: Tyler Hawke

=== Pro Wrestling Pride Tag Team Championship ===
- Final champion: The Professionals (Joshua Knott & Joel Redman)

=== Pro Wrestling Pride Women's Championship ===
- Final champion: Bobbi Tyler

=== Pride Prizefighters Tournament ===
- 2017 Winner: Eddie Ryan
- 2016 Winner: Eddie Ryan
- 2015 winner: Steve Griffiths
- 2014 winner: Darren Saviour

== See also ==
- Professional Wrestling
- List of professional wrestling promotions in the Great Britain and Ireland
