= Corn Exchange, Exeter =

Commercial building in Exeter, Devon, England

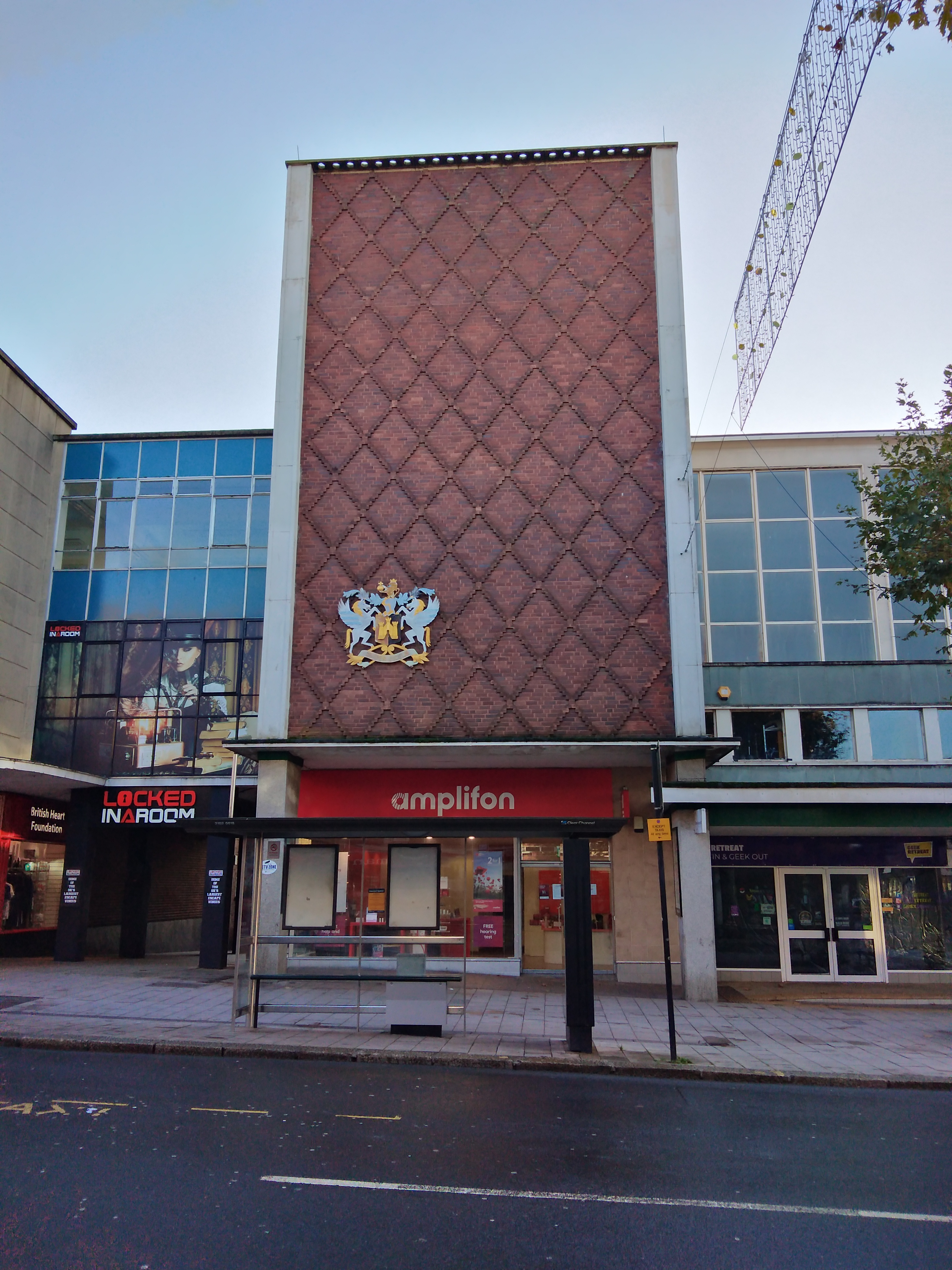
- Corn Exchange, Exeter

- Shown in Devon
- 50.7217°N 3.5327°W
- Location: Market Street, Exeter

History
- Built: 1960

Site notes
- Architect: Harold Rowe
- Architectural style: Modernist style
- Website: www.exetercornexchange.co.uk

The Corn Exchange is a market hall and events venue in the Market Street, Exeter, Devon, England. It was designed by the city architect, Harold Rowe and completed in 1960.

== History ==
The current building was commissioned to replace a structure known as the "Lower Market" which was bounded by Fore Street, Market Street, Guinea Street and Milk Street. (Note: There was also a structure known as the "Higher Market" in Queen Street.) The Lower Market was designed by Charles Fowler in the neoclassical style, built in ashlar stone and was officially opened on 9 December 1836. The principal rooms were a long colonnaded main hall which was used as a butchers' market and a room, above the main entrance in Guinea Street, which operated as a corn exchange. The Lower Market was badly damaged by German bombing in the Baedeker Blitz on 4 May 1942 during the Second World War and was consequently demolished in the late 1950s.

The new building was designed by the city architect, Harold Rowe, in the Modernist style, built in concrete and glass and was opened as "St George's Hall" in 1960. The design involved a main frontage in three sections facing onto Market Street. The central section featured a tall brick structure with diamond-shaped decoration, to which the city coat of arms was fixed at first floor level, flanked by full-height concrete pillars supporting a perforated beam. The three-storey side sections were faced with alternating bands of blue panelling and glass. Internally, the principal rooms were a market hall on the ground floor and an events venue on the first floor. The architectural historian, Nikolaus Pevsner, was unimpressed with the design and described it as "a rather tatty effort in a belated Festival of Britain spirit".

The events venue on the first floor was a popular venue in the 1970s and 1980s: performers included the rock band Thin Lizzy in February 1972, the rock band, New Model Army, in May 1985 and the pub rock band Dr. Feelgood in November 1989.

Following a refurbishment in 2007, the building was re-branded as the "Corn Exchange" recalling one of the uses of the earlier structure on the site. The works, which cost £1.8 million, involved improvements to the auditorium on the first floor as well as the conversion of the ground floor into a sustainable "food emporium". The auditorium has a capacity of 500, seated or standing. There are also two small meeting rooms.

In January 2020, Exeter City Council confirmed that it was considering making further improvements to the Corn Exchange as an alternative to a commissioning a completely new venue for major public events in the city. One of the episodes of the BBC New Comedy Award was held at the venue in 2022.

== See also ==
- Corn exchanges in England
