= List of professional wrestling promotions in Great Britain and Ireland =

This is a list of professional wrestling promotions in Great Britain and Ireland, including England, Scotland, Wales, the Republic of Ireland, Northern Ireland, and the Isle of Man and lists both active and notable defunct professional wrestling promotions from the 1950s to the present day.

== England ==
| Promotion name | Location | Promoter(s) | Years active | Notes |
|---|---|---|---|---|
| 1 Pro Wrestling | Doncaster | Steven Gauntley, Adam Moverley | 2005–2011 2022–2023 | |
| 5 Star Wrestling | Sheffield, Liverpool | Daniel Hinkles | 2015–2018 | |
| All Star Wrestling | Liverpool | Brian Dixon (1970-2023); Joseph Allmark (2022–present) | 1970–present | Longest-running UK wrestling promotion. |
| ATTACK! Pro Wrestling | Bristol, Cheltenham, London | Mark Andrews | 2011–present | Founded by Pete Dunne & Jim Lee in Birmingham in 2011. They also run shows in Cardiff in Wales. |
| Bellatrix Female Warriors | Norfolk, Essex | Saraya Knight | 2006–2009, 2011–present | Female-only wrestling promotion originally known as World Association of Women's Wrestling |
| British Kingdom Pro-Wrestling (Formerly 4 Front Wrestling) | Wiltshire | David Sharp | 2004–present | |
| Frontier Wrestling Alliance (FWA) | Portsmouth, Essex, London | Elisar Cabrera, Mark Sloan, Alex Shane, Tony Simpson | 1993–2007, 2009–2012 | |
| International Pro Wrestling: United Kingdom (IPW:UK) | Portsmouth, Essex, London | Daniel Edler, Billy Wood, Paul Hopkins | 2004–2017 | |
| Joint Promotions / Ring Wrestling Stars | London | Les Martin and Dale family cartel The Hurst Syndicate; Jarvis Astaire; William Hill plc Max Crabtree | 1952–1995 | |
| Lucha Britannia | London | Garry Vanderhorne | 2006–present | |
| New Generation Wrestling (NGW) | Hull | Richard Dunn | 2008–present | |
| NXT UK (WWE) | London, Cardiff, Blackpool | Triple H Vince McMahon | 2018–2022 | WWE's UK-based brands. |
| Preston City Wrestling (PCW) | Preston | Steve Fludder | 2011–present | |
| PROGRESS Wrestling | London | Jon Briley and Glen Joseph | 2012–present | |
| Pro-Wrestling: EVE | London | Dann Read, Emily Read | 2010–present | Female-only wrestling promotion. |
| Pro Wrestling Pride | South West | Darren Saviour | 2012–2017 | |
| Revolution Pro Wrestling | London Hampshire | Andy Quildan, Andy Simmonz | 2012–present | |
| TNT Extreme Wrestling | Liverpool | Jay Apter, Lee McAteer, Martyn Best | 2015–present | |
| World Association of Wrestling (WAW) | East Anglia | Ricky Knight, Zak Zodiac | 1993–present | |

== Ireland ==
| Name | Location | Owner(s) | Years active | Notes |
|---|---|---|---|---|
| Irish Whip Wrestling | Dublin | Simon Rochford | 2002–present | |
| Fight Factory Pro Wrestling | Dublin | Phil Boyd | 2004–present | |
| Over the Top Wrestling | Dublin/Belfast | Joe Cabray | 2014–present | |

== Scotland ==
| Name | Location | Owner(s) | Years active | Notes |
|---|---|---|---|---|
| Relwyskow Promotions (as independent) | Glasgow | Ann Relwyskow | 1986–1994 | Previously part of Joint Promotions, not included in 1986 sale to Max Crabtree. Produced TV specials for Grampian and STV 1990 and 1993 |
| Insane Championship Wrestling | Glasgow | Mark Dallas & Duncan Gray | 2006–present | |

== Wales ==
| Name | Location | Owner(s) | Years active | Notes |
|---|---|---|---|---|
| ATTACK! Pro Wrestling | Cardiff | Mark Andrews | 2011–present | Founded by Pete Dunne & Jim Lee in Birmingham in 2011. They also run shows in different parts of England such as Bristol, Cheltenham and London. |
| British Wrestling Federation | Rhyl | Orig Williams | 1960s - c.2002 | Produced Welsh language TV wrestling show Reslo for S4C 1982-1995 |

== See also ==
- List of professional wrestling promotions
- List of women's wrestling promotions
- List of professional wrestling promotions in Europe
