= Joel Redman =

English professional wrestler (born 1987)

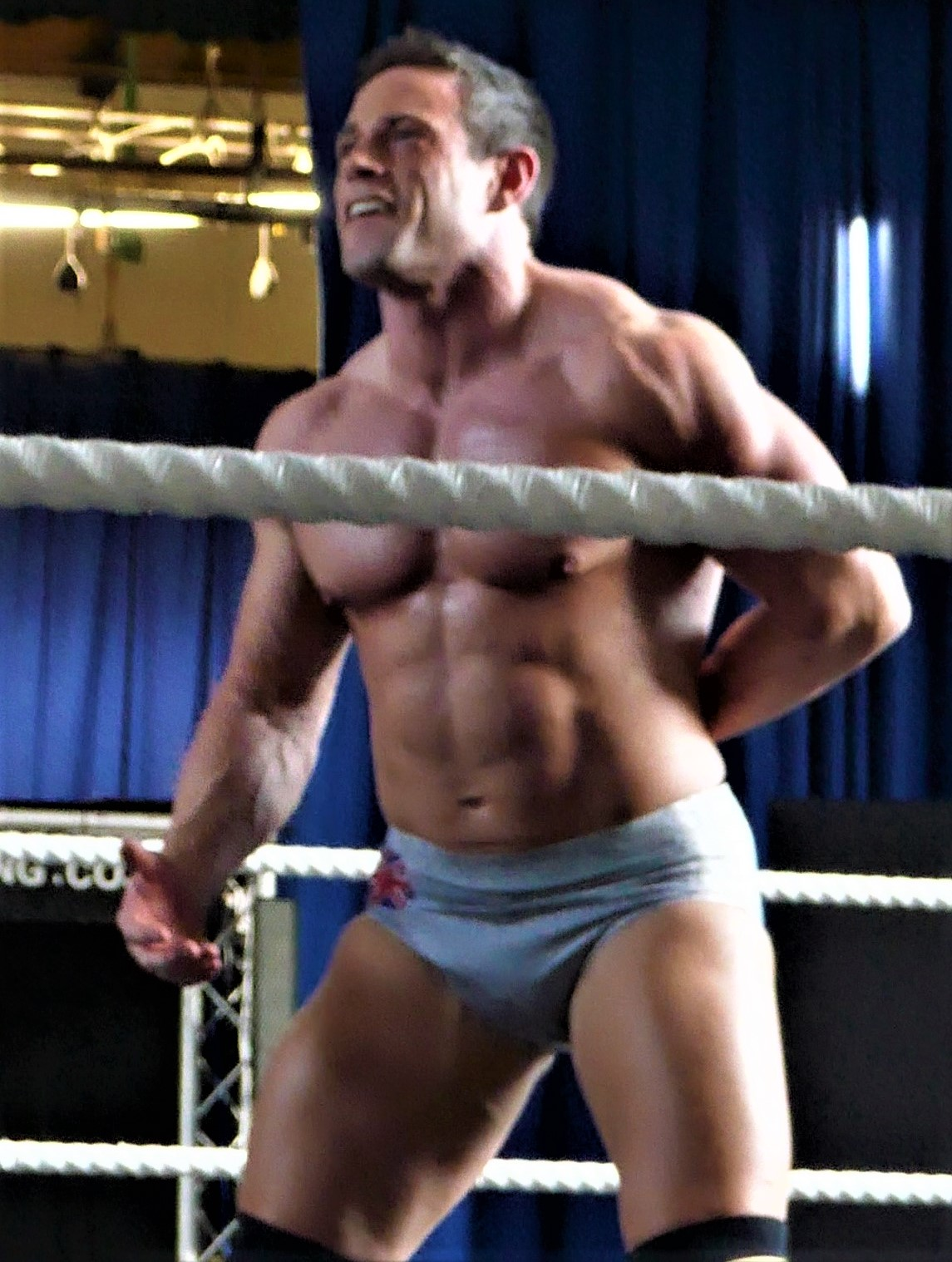
- Redman in May 2018

Personal information
- Born: Joel Pettyfer; 21 February 1987 (age 39) Exeter, Devon, England
- Education: East Devon College

Professional wrestling career
- Ring name(s): Joel Pettifer; Joel Redman; Joey Redman; Jules Redman; Oliver Grey
- Billed height: 6 ft 2 in (188 cm)
- Billed weight: 240 lb (109 kg)
- Billed from: Devon
- Trained by: Revolution British Wrestling; Victory Pro Wrestling; Frontier Wrestling Alliance
- Debut: 2006

Joel Pettyfer (born 21 February 1987) is an English professional wrestler, better known by his ring name Joel Redman. Pettyfer is currently performs on the independent circuit in the United Kingdom, He is best known for his time with International Pro Wrestling: United Kingdom, where he is a former Unified British Tag Team Champion alongside Mark Haskins and Real Quality Wrestling and was a regular competitor in the Frontier Wrestling Alliance. He is also known for his working in WWE's developmental territory NXT under the ring name Oliver Grey, where he was one half of the inaugural NXT Tag Team Champions along with Adrian Neville, often collectively known as British Ambition.

== Professional wrestling career ==
=== Early career (2006) ===
Pettyfer started wrestling with Devon Junior Wrestling Alliance, where he wrestled under his name, before going to Revolution British Wrestling and other UK indie promotions. His first appearance in the newly named Varsity Pro Wrestling (formerly RBW's southwest branch) was in Crediton, Devon, where he would wrestle as Joel Redman in a match where he would be defeated by American wrestler Spiro from San Antonio, Texas on 26 January 2006.

On a later VPW show, Redman attacked Aviv Maayan after Maayan's match. "The Twisted Genius" Dean Ayass returned to the ring and introduced Redman as his new protégé. On VPW's first Charity Show, Maayan got his chance to face Redman, which Maayan won. However, this would not end their feud, as once again, after Mayaan lost a match to Jorge Castano, Redman and Ayass would once again come to the ring and attack Mayaan. After this attack, Ayass would grab the microphone and tell the fans that on the next show back in Horndean, Joel Redman would face Aviv Mayaan once again.

Redman's feud with Aviv Mayaan would not just be contained to VPW. After becoming an alumnus of the training school, Redman went on to train in the FWA Academy, where he would face off with Mayaan again, touring a Title tournament this time on the losing end of the match. After dominating several opponents throughout the end of 2006 in FWA:A, Redman would team up with FWA:A Champion LT Summers to defeat Mark Sloan and Ollie Burns for the FWA:A Tag Team Championships.

=== Premier Promotions (2006–2012) ===
Over the years, Redman has become a regular for Premier Promotions and debuted in 2006, teaming with Kris Kay to defeat Chris Andrews and Sam Andrews. In late 2007, Redman participated in a one-night tournament, losing to Danny Collins in the semi-finals. In early 2008, the PWF Mid-Heavyweight Championship was vacated by Doug Williams, and to find a champion, there was a round robin tournament in which Redman was involved; however, he lost all his matches and was eliminated. Throughout 2008, Redman had made an impression on Premier Promotions with his technical prowess and spirit, never to give up, which culminated on 4 September when Redman defeated Marty Scurll in the finals of the Ian Dowland Trophy. With this win, he took on Ricky Knight for the PWF Mid-Heavyweight Championship but lost via countout. Towards the end of 2009, a year Redman spent away from Premier Promotions, he returned to participate in the Ken Joyce Trophy 2009. Still, he would lose to legendary British wrestler Robbie Brookside in the semi-final. In March 2010, he won a one-night tournament and would win another in April. Redman would once again become a regular for Premier Promotions and defeated Justin Starr towards the end of the year to win the Ken Joyce Trophy 2010. Following this win, on 27 February 2011, he defeated UK Dominator in a British rules match for the vacant PWF International Championship. As the reigning champion, Redman entered the Worthing Trophy 2011 and reached the final, where Danny Garnell defeated him. Redman teamed up with Jonny Storm to take on Kris Kay and UK Dominator in a British rules match for the vacant PWF Tag Team Championship, which they lost. Redman vacated the PWF International Championship when he was signed by World Wrestling Entertainment and moved to their developmental system, NXT Wrestling.

=== UK "New School" promotions (2007–2009, 2015–2017) ===
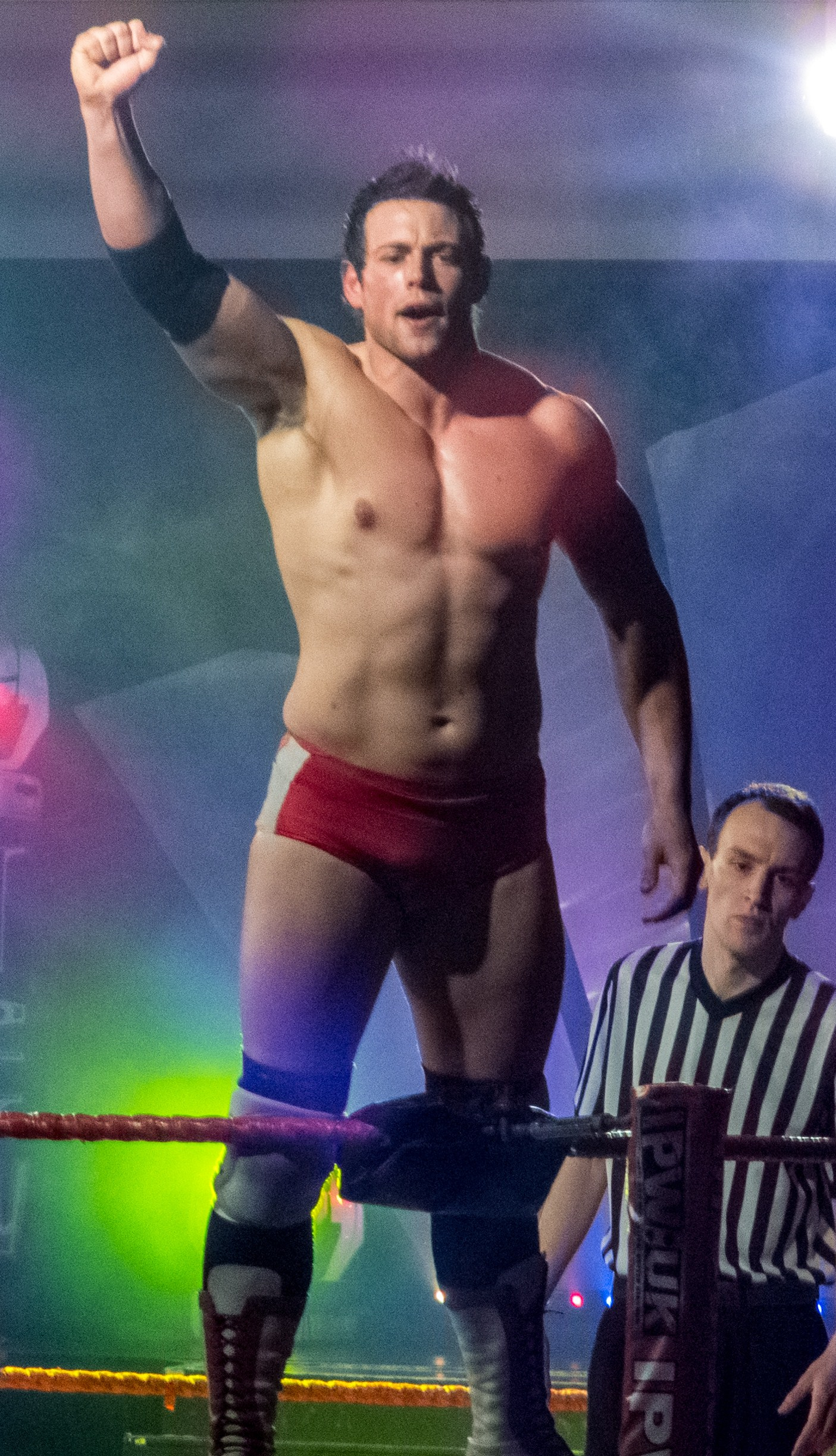
Redman at an IPW:UK show in April 2012.

Redman formed a team with Mark Haskins known as The Thrillers. On their debut match, involving a special guest referee, they lost to The South Coast Rock 'n' Roll Express (Ian Logan and Jake McCluskey) on 14 July 2007. The team would go on a losing streak for the next few months and even lost to The Kartel (Sha Samuels and Terry Frazier) in a match for the IPW:UK Tag Team Championship. The Thrillers won their first match as a tag team in a dark match by defeating JP Monroe and Jules Lambrini on 27 January 2008.

The team debuted for Real Quality Wrestling on 16 February 2008 and defeated the Maximum Head (Dan Head & Max Voltage), and would beat The Lost Boys (Danny Darko and Jo FX) next month. After their two successful matches, they challenged The Damned Nation (Cameron Kraze and Dragon Aisu) on 26 April for the RQW Tag Team Championship, which they won.

The Thrillers returned to International Pro Wrestling: United Kingdom on 4 May, triumphant with tag team gold in the form of RQW Tag Team Championship, only to lose the championship to The Kartel (Sha Samuels & Terry Frazier) in a championship unification match, which also involved the IPW:UK Tag Team Championship. The team debuted for One Pro Wrestling, losing to BritRage (Mark Sloan & Wade Fitzgerald). However, they would beat The Kartel on 28 September for the Unified British Tag Team Championship. The Thrillers would then debut for Westside Xtreme Wrestling at the beginning of 2009 and won a wXw Tag Team Championship contendership match defeating Adam Polak and Lazio Fe. With that win, they challenged Doug Williams and Martin Stone for the wXw Tag Team Championship the following month, but were unable to win the title.

Upon their return to IPW:UK, The Thrillers lost the Unified British Tag Team Championship to The Leaders of The New School (Marty Scurll and Zack Sabre Jr.). The Thrillers tried to regain the championship on two separate occasions, the first ending in a DQ and the second where they were defeated clean in a tables, ladder, and chairs match.

On 15 February 2015, Martin Stone was confirmed to have returned to the United States for another company, so Joel Redman had to choose another partner to substitute for Stone. At High Stakes, this partner was revealed to be Mark Haskins, successfully defending the titles and reuniting once more. After Haskins was injured in mid-2015, Jake McCluskey stepped in as a replacement partner at Summer Sizzler; however, Redman and McCluskey were unable to defeat The Kartel (Sha Samuels and James Castle) and subsequently lost the British Tag Team Championship. In 2016, Redman began teaming with Charlie Garrett, and the duo successfully defeated The Kartel on 12 June 2016 at Angle vs Sabre Jr. to end their reign at two days short of one year.

Their first defence took place the following month at Summer Sizzler, defeating Jody Fleisch and Jonny Storm, Jake McCluskey and Kieran Bruce and The Legion of Lords (Gideon Grey and Rishi Ghosh) in a fatal four way to retain. Redman and Garrett successfully defended the championships again in November, defeating NJPW's Los Ingobernables de Japón (Evil and Bushi) at Global Wars UK. Redman and Garrett (now known as Charlie Sterling) made two successful defences in January 2017, first defeating The London Riots (James Davis and Rob Lynch) at Live at the Cockpit 12, and War Machine (Hanson and Raymond Rowe) at High Stakes.

=== Irish Whip Wrestling (2008–2009) ===
Redman made his debut for Irish Whip Wrestling on 5 July 2008 in a four corners match for the IWW International Heavyweight Championship, which Mandrake won; the match also involved Doug Basham and Vic Viper. After competing in only a few matches in 2008, the following year, he became a regular at the promotion. He took on LA Warren for the IWW Zero Gravity Championship and Mandrake for the IWW International Heavyweight Championship on multiple occasions, but would also come up short. In mid-2009, Redman had formed a partnership with Captain Rooney, which for their short time together worked, winning all their matches; however, Rooney turned on Redman and joined up with Bingo Ballance. The Redman and Ballance feud culminated with Ballance coming out on top. Redman's last match for IWW was against Mandrake for the IWW International Heavyweight Championship, once again losing.

=== WWE ===
==== Florida Championship Wrestling (2012) ====
In a March 2012 interview, Pettyfer stated that he had signed a contract with WWE following two try-out matches and was waiting for his visa to be approved before traveling to Florida to join WWE's developmental territory. Pettyfer debuted under the Joel Redman name at a Florida Championship Wrestling (FCW) live event on 20 June 2012, teaming with Conor O'Brian, against Garrett Dylan and Rick Victor in a losing effort. On the 28 June 2012 FCW live event, Pettyfer competed under his real name, teaming with CJ Parker in a losing effort against Big E Langston and Lincoln Broderick. Pettyfer would make his singles debut at the 29 June 2012 FCW live event against Mason Ryan in a losing effort.

==== NXT (2012–2014) ====
On 19 September 2012, Pettyfer made his NXT televised debut using the ring name Oliver Grey and lost two sparring matches to Kassius Ohno.

In early 2013, Grey began teaming with Adrian Neville, and the two entered the tournament to determine the inaugural NXT Tag Team Champions. They defeated 3MB (Heath Slater and Drew McIntyre) and Kassius Ohno and Leo Kruger en route to the final, where they defeated The Wyatt Family (Luke Harper and Erick Rowan) on the 13 February episode of NXT, originally taped on 31 January. Grey then suffered a torn anterior cruciate ligament and was written off television in March 2013 after an attack by the Wyatt Family. Whilst Grey was injured, he was replaced as tag champion by Bo Dallas, with whom Neville lost the title to the Wyatt Family on 2 May.

After over a year off television, Grey returned on the 10 April 2014 episode of NXT, and promptly lost his first match back against Camacho on the 17 April episode. On 30 April 2014, it was reported that WWE had released Grey. His final TV appearance on the 8 May 2014 episode of NXT (taped before his release) was participating in a 20-man battle royal to determine the number one contender for the NXT Championship, only to be the first one eliminated by Brodus Clay.

=== All Star Wrestling (2017–present) ===
On 22 October 2017 in Ipswich, Redman as Oliver Grey defeated Harlem Bravado for the All Star Wrestling "Superslam" British Heavyweight Championship. In February 2020. In Gravesend, he lost the title to Niwa, a Māori person from New Zealand. Due to his country's COVID-19 restrictions, Niwa was unavailable to defend his championship until 2022, when he returned to the UK, and Grey regained the title in Telford, defending it in numerous rematches with Niwa for the remainder of the year. One such rematch on 16 October 2022 in New Brighton was attended by legendary masked wrestler Kendo Nagasaki as a ringside judge. During the match, Nagasaki used his "powers" to prevent Niwa from seizing the championship belt to use as a weapon. Niwa and Grey/Redman have taken their feud to other UK promotions, including Rumble Wrestling.

=== All Japan Pro Wrestling (2019) ===
On 4 April 2019, Redman debuted for the Japanese promotion All Japan Pro Wrestling, teaming with Dylan James, Gianni Valletta and Sam Adonis to defeat Ryouji Sai, Yoshitatsu, Yuma Aoyagi and Zeus. He took part in the 2019 edition of the Champion Carnival tournament, finishing second to last in the B-block with 6 points. Redman challenged for his first title in All Japan on 24 October 2019 when he and fellow WWE alumni Yoshitatsu challenged Zeus and Ryoji Sai for the AJPW World Tag Team Championships. Redman and Tatsu, now working under the tag team name of One World, would also enter the 2019 edition of the Real World Tag League in November that year.

== Personal life ==
From an early age, Pettyfer played rugby and participated in judo. He attended East Devon College. While wrestling in England, Pettyfer simultaneously worked as a forester.

== Championship and accomplishments ==
- All Star Wrestling
  - ASW Superslam Championship (2 times, current)
- Combat Championship Wrestling
  - CCW Heavyweight Championship (1 time, current)
- Devon Wrestling Association
  - DWA Trophy Championship (2 times)
  - DWA Trophy Championship Tournament (2009)
- Evolution Wrestling
  - Evolution Heavyweight Championship (3 times)
- Full Force Wrestling
  - FFW Championship (2 times)
- FWA Academy
  - FWA Academy Tag Team Championship (1 time) – with LT Summers
  - FWA Tag wars Tournament – with LT Summers (2006)
- Grand Slam Wrestling
  - GSW British Championship (1 time, inaugural)
  - GrandSlam Tag Team Championship (1 time, current) - with Eddie Ryan
- International Pro Wrestling: United Kingdom
  - IPW:UK Tag Team Championship (1 time) – with Doug Basham, Mark Haskins and Ricky Hype
- Premier Promotions
  - PWF International Championship (1 time)
  - Ian Dowland Trophy (2008)
  - Ken Joyce Trophy (2010)
- Pro Evolution Wrestling
  - Pro-EVW Heavyweight Championship (2 times)
- Pro Wrestling Pride
  - PWP Catch Division Championship (1 time)
  - PWP Tag Team Championship (1 time) – with Joshua Knott
- Pro Wrestling Illustrated
  - PWI ranked him #205 of the top 500 singles wrestlers in the PWI 500 in 2013
- REACH Wrestling
  - REACH Championship (1 time)
  - REACH Journey for Gold Tournament (2019)
- Real Quality Wrestling
  - RQW Tag Team Championship (1 time) – with Mark Haskins
- Revolution Pro Wrestling
  - RPW Undisputed British Tag Team Championship (4 times) – with Doug Basham, Iestyn Rees, Mark Haskins and Ricky Hype (1), Martin Stone (1), Mark Haskins (1) and Charlie Garrett (1)
- South West Wrestling
  - SWW Tag Team championship (2 times) – with Eddie Ryan
- United X Conquer Wrestling
  - UXC Heavyweight Championship (1 time)
- Wrestling in Europa
  - Southern Countries Trophy (2010)
  - Tournament Of Conquest (2018)
- WWE
  - NXT Tag Team Championship (1 time, inaugural) – with Adrian Neville
  - NXT Tag Team Championship Tournament (2013) – with Adrian Neville
