= Lucha Britannia =

British professional wrestling promotion

- Acronym: LB
- Founded: 2006
- Style: Lucha libre Vaudeville
- Headquarters: Bethnal Green, London
- Founder: Garry Vanderhorne
- Owner: Garry Vanderhorne
- Website: http://www.luchabritannia.com/

Lucha Britannia is a British professional wrestling promotion based in Bethnal Green, London since 2006. It is known for popularizing the lucha libre wrestling style in the UK.

== History ==
Lucha Britannia was created by Garry Vanderhorne in 2006 from Rock & Metal Wrestling Action (RAMWA), as an alternative form of physical theatre, music, cabaret, comedy and professional wrestling. In 2007, Lucha Britannia held the first of its six sell-out shows at Bethnal Green Working Men's Club. By November 2007 The promotion had outgrown the Working Men's Club and moved to SeOne, a large nightclub beneath London Bridge station. In December that year they were listed by Time Out in their (London) top five Best alternative nightlife of 2007.

In the summer of 2008 Lucha Britannia featured on the BBC's coverage of the Reading and Leeds festivals and in October that year they co-hosted the inaugural Bizarre Ball in conjunction with Bizarre Magazine. In 2009, Lucha Britannia became the first UK based wrestling promotion to feature on live British television in twenty-five years when they featured in their coverage of the Brit Awards after-party at Earls Court hosted by Rufus Hound. Later that year they returned to co-produce and host the second Bizarre Ball again for Bizarre Magazine.

During 2011, Lucha Britannia put on seventeen events in London and around the UK. In 2016 the promotion increased to hosting semi-monthly shows called Lucha Underground at the Resistance Gallery in Bethnal Green, East London on Friday nights.

Events continued at the Resistance Gallery until 2020 when it briefly closed during the COVID-19 pandemic. It triumphantly returned in April 2023 at Village Underground in Shoreditch where there are now regular shows.

== Style ==
Lucha Britannia combines the Mexican lucha libre style of wrestling that is characterized by the wearing of colourful masks, rapid sequences of holds and maneuvers, tag-teams and "high-flying" with the traditional British technical style, and Japanese puroresu wrestling format. Aside from wrestling, Lucha Britannia events also include risqué cabaret performances, comedic interludes and side acts.

All the characters and performers in Lucha Britannia loosely fit into a fantastical narrative called the "RetroFutureVerse" wherein a fractious band of outlawed prize-fighters (known as the "United Resistance Movement") battle for justice and dignity against the dastardly representatives of tyrannical rulers (known either as "The State" or "The Yankee Boche") in an ornately cruel, futuristic dystopia.

The promotion runs regular monthly shows from the Village Underground – a venue in Shoreditch in London's East End. Lucha Britannia spawned the London School of Lucha Libre, Lucha Britannia's own professional-wrestling training academy, as well as hosting a variety of other events.

Lucha Britannia has also been an attraction on television and at major UK festivals including the Glastonbury Festival, Download Festival, Reading Festival, Leeds Festival and The Brit Awards.

Regular events include immersive theatre with many elements of wrestling, comedy, and sinister cabaret in their shows.

== World Championship ==
As only months are known, each reign is listed as beginning on the first of the month although this may not be true.

Key
No.	Overall reign number
Reign	Reign number for the specific champion
N/A	The information is not available or is unknown
+	Current reign is changing daily

No.	Champion	Championship change			Reign statistics		Notes	Ref.
No.	Champion	Date	Event	Location	Reign	Days	Notes	Ref.
1	Leon Brittannico	20 January 2012	Lucha Britannia	London, England	1	273	Defeated Bradford W. Bush to become inaugural champion.	
2	Santeria	19 October 2012	Lucha Britannia	London, England	1	147		
3	Metallico	15 March 2013	March Madness	London, England	1	77		
4	Dark Brittanico	31 May 2013	The Super Lucha Summer Extravaganza	London, England	1	140		
5	Metallico	18 October 2013	October Frightmare	London, England	2	<1		
6	Santeria	18 October 2013	October Frightmare	London, England	2	42		
7	Anteios	29 November 2013	I Was Santa's Love Slave	London, England	1	112		
8	The Bengal Tiger	21 March 2014	Lucha Britannia	London, England	1	56	Defeated Santeria for the vacant title.	
9	Dark Britannico	16 May 2014	Lucha Britannia	London, England	2	35		
10	Glamsexico	20 June 2014	Lucha Britannia	London, England	1	56		
11	Leon Britannico	15 August 2014	Lucha Britannia	London, England	1	77		
12	Santeria	31 October 2014	Lucha Britannia	London, England	3	77		
13	Freddie Mercurio	16 January 2015	Lucha Britannia	London, England	1	91		
14	Santeria	17 April 2015	April’s Atonement	London, England	4	63	This was a three-way match, also involving Metallico.	
15	Cassius	19 June 2015	Lucha Britannia	London, England	1	154		
16	Fug	20 November 2015	Lucha Britannia	London, England	1	28	This was a three-way match, also involving Santeria.	
17	Cassius	18 December 2015	Lucha Britannia	London, England	2	21		
18	Freddie Mercurio	8 January 2016	Lucha Britannia	London, England	2	7		
19	Cassius	15 January 2016	Lucha Britannia	London, England	3	63		
20	La Diablesa Rosa	18 March 2016	Lucha Britannia	London, England	1	154		
21	Lord Reginald Windsor	19 August 2016	Lucha Britannia	London, England	1	63		
22	Jerry Bakewell	21 October 2016	Lucha Britannia	London, England	1	28		
23	Malik	18 November 2016	Lucha Britannia	London, England	1	28		
24	Cassius	16 December 2016	Lucha Britannia	London, England	4	35		
25	La Diablesa Rosa	20 January 2017	Lucha Britannia	London, England	2	91		
26	Hombre Del Rocka	21 April 2017	Lucha Britannia	London, England	1	56		
27	La Diablesa Rosa	16 June 2017	Lucha Britannia	London, England	3	63		
28	Pavo Real	18 August 2017	Lucha Britannia	London, England	1	154		
29	La Diablesa Rosa	19 January 2018	Lucha Britannia	London, England	4	182		
30	Jerry Bakewell	20 July 2018	Lucha Britannia	London, England	2	63		
31	Fug	21 September 2018	Lucha Britannia	London, England	2	147		
32	Triffidos	15 February 2019	Lucha Britannia	London, England	1	106		
33	El Ray Anansie	1 June 2019	Lucha Britannia	London, England	1	0		
34	Triffidos	1 June 2019	Lucha Britannia	London, England	1	56		
35	El Ray Anansie	27 July 2019	Lucha Britannia	London, England	2	1		
36	Triffidos	28 July 2019	Lucha Britannia	London, England	2	80		
37	Hanuman	16 October 2019	Lucha Britannia	London, England	1	30		
38	Cara Noir (Pava Real)	15 November 2019	Lucha Britannia	London, England	2	63		
39	Disco Diablo	17 January 2020	Lucha Britannia	London, England	1	1,273		
40	Bradford W. Bush	13 July 2023	Lucha Britannia	London, England	1	133	First match after the Pandemic	
41	Marduk Malik	23 November 2023	Lucha Britannia	London, England	2	120		
42	Bullito	22 March 2024	Lucha Britannia	London, England	1	0	Champion for only eight minutes!	
43	La Diablesa Rosa	22 March 2024	Lucha Britannia	London, England	5	846	La Diablese Rosa retired because she was pregnant.	
44	Patito Peligroso	16 July 2026	Lucha Britannia	London, England	0	69+		

== See also ==
- Professional wrestling in the United Kingdom
- List of professional wrestling promotions in the United Kingdom
