= Will Ospreay =

English professional wrestler (born 1993)

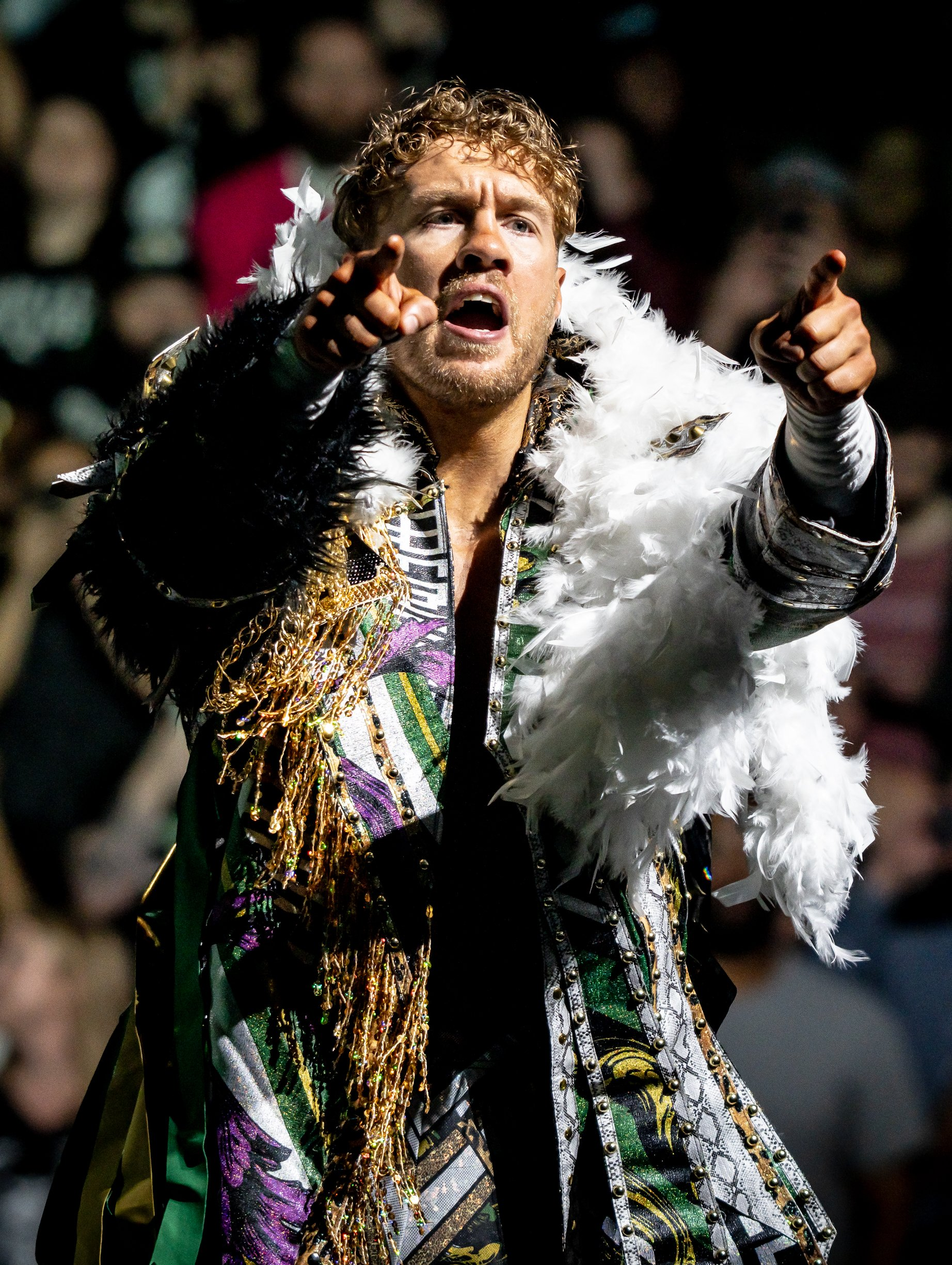
- Ospreay in 2024

Personal information
- Born: William Peter Charles Ospreay; 7 May 1993 (age 33) London, England
- Spouse: Alex Windsor (m. 2026)

Professional wrestling career
- Ring name(s): Jason Artem; Dark Britannico; Neo Britannico; Will Ospreay
- Billed height: 1.85 m (6 ft 1 in)
- Billed weight: 100 kg (220 lb)
- Billed from: Essex, England
- Trained by: Garry Vanderhorn; Greg Burridge; London School of Lucha Libre
- Debut: 1 April 2012

William Peter Charles Ospreay (born 7 May 1993) is an English professional wrestler. As of November 2023, he is signed to All Elite Wrestling (AEW), where he is the leader of the AEW branch of the United Empire and current AEW World Champion in his first reign. He also makes appearances for New Japan Pro-Wrestling (NJPW), while also working for Pro-Wrestling: EVE as a producer and a member of the creative team. Known for his in-ring ability, he is widely regarded as one of the best wrestlers in the world.

Ospreay previously wrestled for NJPW's United Kingdom-based partner promotion Revolution Pro Wrestling (RevPro), where he is a former and longest reigning Undisputed British Heavyweight Champion. He also wrestled for British promotion Progress Wrestling, where he is a former Progress World Champion.

Ospreay began his career on the UK independent circuit in 2012. In 2016, after being recommended by AJ Styles, he began to work with the Japanese promotion NJPW as part of the junior heavyweight division, becoming a three-time IWGP Junior Heavyweight Champion and the winner of the 2016 and 2019 Best of the Super Juniors. In 2019, Ospreay also won the NEVER Openweight Championship. That same year, Ospreay participated in the G1 Climax, NJPW's biggest tournament featuring heavyweight wrestlers. In 2020, he made his transition to the heavyweight division, where he won the IWGP Heavyweight Championship. He was also the winner of 2021 New Japan Cup. Ospreay is a former two-time and the final IWGP United States Heavyweight Champion, as the title was deactivated in December 2023 when Ospreay was in his second reign.

Before signing with AEW, Ospreay had also periodically ventured into the American wrestling circuit; he made appearances in NJPW partner promotions Total Nonstop Action Wrestling (TNA, formerly known as Impact Wrestling) and Ring of Honor (ROH), where he is a former ROH World Television Champion, as well as independent promotions like Pro Wrestling Guerrilla (PWG). After making appearances in AEW in 2022 and 2023, he signed with the company and officially joined its roster after his NJPW contract expired in February 2024. In AEW, he became a two-time AEW International Champion and the winner of the 2026 Owen Hart Cup. He won the AEW World Championship at All In in 2026.

Ospreay holds the record for the most 5 or more stars matches given by wrestling journalist Dave Meltzer with a total of 59 matches; he is also one of five wrestlers to have wrestled two five-star matches on the same night, a feat he achieved at AEW's Worlds End in 2024.

== Early life ==
William Peter Charles Ospreay was born in London's Havering borough on 7 May 1993. He decided to become a wrestler after watching the three-way match between AJ Styles, Christopher Daniels, and Samoa Joe at TNA's 2005 Unbreakable event. Ospreay, alongside friend Kip Sabian, did backyard wrestling before Ospreay received formal professional wrestling training at Lucha Britannia's London School of Lucha Libre in Bethnal Green.

== Professional wrestling career ==
=== Early career (2012) ===
Ospreay made his professional debut at the co-promoted BritWres-Fest on 1 April 2012 as the masked character Dark Britannico, the evil twin of Leon Britannico who was played by Paul Robinson, Ospreay's future tag team partner in the team The Swords of Essex. While wrestling with Lucha Britannia he twice won the Lucha Britannia World Championship.

=== Progress Wrestling (2012–2019, 2023) ===
Ospreay soon became a regular for Progress Wrestling, debuting for them at Chapter Two: The March of Progress with Alex Esmail in a loss to The London Riots (James Davis and Rob Lynch). His performance earned him a place in the Natural Progression Series I tournament, aimed at scouting and showcasing new wrestlers. He lost in the first round to eventual winner Mark Andrews in November and again in a rematch the following May. Andrews, who, as part of his reward for winning, picked Ospreay to enter the following Natural Progression Series tournament. The two met again in January 2014 in the first round of the Progress Tag Team Championship tournament, with FSU (Andrews' team with Eddie Dennis) defeating The Swords of Essex (Ospreay's team with Paul Robinson).

In his Natural Progression Series II opening match, his opponent Zack Gibson tried to win by holding the ropes. Robinson prevented Gibson using the ropes, which in turn distracted the referee for long enough for Gibson to low-blow Ospreay and make Ospreay submit. On 18 May, The Swords of Essex were one of the final two teams standing in a four-team elimination match to decide contenders to the Progress Tag Team Championship. During the match, Ospreay, having been isolated for some time, reached out to tag his partner, but Robinson jumped off the apron and walked out on Ospreay. Ospreay was left on his own and lost the match, after which the Progress Champion Jimmy Havoc came to the ring and ordered London Riots to tie Ospreay. Havoc pulled out a knife and threatened to torture Ospreay, blaming it on Ospreay's popularity with the fans, before other wrestlers came out and intervened, freeing Ospreay. Havoc and The London Riots formed an allegiance known as Regression, which also featured Robinson.

On 27 July, Ospreay entered the eight-man, staggered entry elimination Thunderbastard match, the winner of whom can pick a time for a Progress Championship match. Ospreay entered the match third and was immediately low-blowed by Robinson, who had already entered, and disqualified himself in the hopes of taking out Ospreay. Ospreay recovered and eventually eliminated Marty Scurll last to win Thunderbastard. The following show saw Ospreay team up with FSU and Noam Dar in an eight-man tag team match with FSU and Havoc's respective titles, Ospreay's title contendership and everyone else's Progress contracts at stake, depending which individual lost. During the match, Ospreay moonsaulted from the Electric Ballroom's balcony onto his opponents, on the floor. Later, he had Havoc in position to be pinned but as he jumped from the top rope, Robinson dragged Havoc outside, leading Ospreay to pin Davis and end the London Riots' contract with Progress.

At the next event, Ospreay defeated Robinson and announced he would invoke his Thunderbastard right to challenge for Havoc's championship at the following show. He lost the championship match in January after Havoc loosened the top rope, making it more difficult for Ospreay to do high-flying moves, and used it as a weapon. During the Spring Bank Holiday weekend, Ospreay defeated El Ligero, Mark Haskins, Roderick Strong and Zack Sabre Jr across two days to win the first Super Strong Style 16 tournament and once again lay claim to Havoc's championship. Their rematch took place on 26 July in a no disqualification match where the reinstated London Riots neutralised the threat of Robinson's interference and Ospreay ended Havoc's 609 day reign to become Progress Champion.

Ospreay successfully defended his title against the 2015 Thunderbastard Haskins and then Robinson. Robinson attacked Ospreay after losing to him, but a returning Mark Andrews saved Ospreay. Ospreay went on to finally beat Andrews to defend his title. Ospreay also headlined Progress' first main show outside of London in Manchester, in a triple threat match against Zack Gibson and Morgan Webster to close out 2015.

He lost the championship on 24 January 2016 to Marty Scurll when the referee stopped the match as Ospreay had passed out while being handcuffed in Scurll's chickenwing submission. Ospreay lost a rematch with Scurll at WrestleCon Supershow in Texas, USA, in April and also lost a contendership match against Haskins on 31 July. He spent the rest of the year in showcase matches against non-regular Progress wrestlers, losing to Zack Sabre Jr., Shane Strickland, Matt Riddle, and Adam Cole. Finally, on 30 December, at a card composed exclusively of unannounced matches, Ospreay lost to Havoc. After the match, Havoc invited Ospreay to join him in his fight against British Strong Style, who held the World and Tag Team Championship. Ospreay instead attacked Havoc and then realigned with Swords of Essex partner Paul Robinson. Ospreay attacked Havoc again during the latter's Progress World Championship match, leading to a Fans Bring The Weapons match in March. During the match, Ospreay challenged Havoc to put their Progress contracts on the line before losing the match and leaving the promotion.

Ospreay returned at the last event of 2017 as a mystery opponent for Progress Champion Travis Banks, but he lost the match. At Chapter 61, Ospreay defeated Adam Brooks, this was his first victory in the promotion since losing the Progress Championship in 2016. At Progress Chapter 66, Ospreay defeated Mark Haskins.

On 7 May 2018, day 3 of the 2018 Super Strong Style 16 tournament, Ospreay challenged Jimmy Havoc to a match at Wembley Arena on 30 September 2018, but was forced to withdraw due to contractual obligations with New Japan Pro-Wrestling. The match was then set for Chapter 75, with Ospreay emerging victorious in a no disqualification, 2 out of 3 falls match with former tag team partner Paul Robinson as referee. At Chapter 82: Unboxing Live, Ospreay and Paul Robinson defeated Aussie Open (Kyle Fletcher & Mark Davis) to become the Progress Tag Team Champions.

In May 2023, Ospreay returned to Progress as part of the 2023 Super Strong Style 16 tournament. He defeated Tate Mayfairs in his first match, but lost by disqualification to Nathan Cruz, eliminating him from the tournament. However, he reformed the Swords of Essex when his former tag partner, Paul Robinson, came out to give his support. On Day 3, The Swords of Essex were assisted by Callum Newman to beat CPF in a tag match in a winning effort.

=== British independent circuit (2012–2023) ===
Throughout his career, Ospreay was regular on the British independent scene and has regularly wrestled for International Pro Wrestling: United Kingdom (IPW: UK) since September 2012 in singles matches, with Paul Robinson as Swords of Essex and with Tom Dawkins as Spitfire Britannia, playing off their alter egos Pure Britannico and Neo Britannico for Lucha Britannia. Ospreay made it through to the final of the UK Super 8 tournament in both 2014 and 2015, losing to Zack Sabre Jr and Rampage Brown respectively. He won the 30-man Battle Royale 2014 in April but failed to win it the following year when the All England Championship was on the line. On 28 March 2016, Ospreay lost a Loser Leaves Town match to his former Spitfire Britannia partner Dawkins.

The Swords of Essex began wrestling for Future Pro Wrestling (FPW) in May 2013 and, after a series of wins, became the first FPW Tag Team Champions after winning a four-way match. They held the titles for nine months and eventually became embroiled in a Best of Four match series against both The London Riots and The Alpha Males (Iestyn Rees & Charlie Garrett) for the FPW Tag Team Championship. The Swords of Essex failed to win a match in the series, with Ospreay wrestling the final match, which also had the London Riots' IPW:UK and New Generation Wrestling Tag Team Championship on the line, without Robinson. Ospreay has been unable to replicate similar success as a singles wrestler, twice entering the Zero G tournament but failing to win.

Ospreay also became a regular for Southside Wrestling Entertainment (SWE) from March 2014 onwards. After failing to win the Speed King Championship from Kay Lee Ray in a co-promoted show with Combat Zone Wrestling in October, he won it a fortnight later in a Six-Way Elimination match. He defended it over the following months to many SWE and guest wrestlers, eventually putting it on the line in the annual Speed King Tournament, where he beat Mark Andrews in the semi-final in a Best of Three falls match, but lost the title to El Ligero in a Six-Way Elimination match on 30 May 2015. The following March, he unsuccessfully challenged Joseph Connors for the SWE Heavyweight Championship, but on 7 August won the Speed King championship for the second time from Andrew Everett.

On 27 August 2016, Ospreay posted a Facebook live video unveiling a new British Triangle Championship with his three Swords of Essex partners Paul Robinson, Jerry Sevanchez, and Scott Wainwright. They announced that the trios championships were not specific to any promotion and could therefore be defended anywhere.

Ospreay wrestled a series of shows across 2016 for What Culture Pro Wrestling (WCPW) for both their weekly YouTube broadcast and iPPV shows, scoring wins over Noam Dar, Marty Scurll, and feud with Martin Kirby. On WCPW Loaded #15 Ospreay defeated Martin Kirby with help from Adam Pacitti, Paul Robinson & Scott Wainwright, joining the Pacitti Club. At WCPW True Destiny, Ospreay teamed with Scotty Wainwright and defeated El Ligero & Gabriel Kidd and Johnny Moss & Liam Slater and Prospect (Alex Gracie & Lucas Archer) in a four-way ladder match to become WCPW Tag Team Champions. They lost the title to War Machine on an episode of Loaded. In August 2017, Ospreay made it to the finals of the Pro Wrestling World Cup before losing to Kushida.

On 4 January 2017, Ospreay, along with fellow British wrestler Ryan Smile, started their own promotion, known as Lucha Forever, with their first show, The Dawning of Forever, taking place on 17 April in Birmingham.

=== Revolution Pro Wrestling (2013–2024, 2026) ===
Ospreay debuted for Revolution Pro Wrestling (RevPro) on 10 February 2013 with a win over Mike Hitchman. He soon started appearing in tag matches with Paul Robinson as The Swords of Essex and, after earning contendership with a win over The London Riots, won the British Tag Team Championship on 15 June 2013 during RevPro's first show at York Hall by defeating Project Ego (Kris Travis and Martin Kirby). After losing to Ricochet in a singles match, The Swords of Essex lost their British Tag Team Championship to Ricochet and his partner Rich Swann, The Inner City Machine Gun on 15 March 2014.

On 19 October, Ospreay beat Josh Bodom for the British Cruiserweight Championship in a match that also included Swann. The day before, he had lost a match to Matt Sydal and so in May 2015, the two had a rematch. Although Ospreay won the rematch, with their series at 1–1, the two were booked in a Best of Three Falls match with the British Cruiserweight Championship on the line. After losing the first fall, he retained the title with two straight falls. After an eleven-month reign, with a number of title defences, Ospreay lost the title back to Bodom on 5 September 2015.

Ospreay bounced back with wins over P. J. Black, René Duprée, and Ricochet, which put him in line for a three-way match for AJ Styles' British Heavyweight Championship, which also featured Marty Scurll, where the champion retained. The following day, on 3 October 2015, he lost to New Japan Pro-Wrestling's Kazuchika Okada. Okada, impressed with Ospreay, went on to recommend him to NJPW officials. This, along with endorsements from AJ Styles and Hiroshi Tanahashi, eventually led to Ospreay being signed by NJPW. In 2016 Ospreay beat Scurll and the new Cruiserweight Champion Pete Dunne in a non-title triple threat match, as well as beating Mike Bailey, which saw him earn a Cruiserweight Championship match against Dunne on 10 July which he won. The following month, Ospreay headlined York Hall in a match against Vader. The feud began after Vader had criticised a NJPW Best of the Super Juniors match between Ospreay and Ricochet in May, comparing the match to "a gymnastics routine". The debate escalated over Twitter, with many wrestling journalists and veterans weighing in on the debate. Their match eventually took place on 12 August, with Ospreay losing to Vader after Dunne interfered while the referee was distracted. On 13 April 2017, Ospreay lost the British Cruiserweight Championship to interim champion Josh Bodom. Following a non-title contest against Zack Sabre Jr at 'Monday Night Mayhem' in Portsmouth. in which Ospreay won on 10 November 2017 at Global Wars, Ospreay failed to win the Undisputed British Heavyweight Championship from Zack Sabre Jr. At High Stakes on 14 February 2020, Ospreay defeated Sabre Jr. to win the Undisputed British Heavyweight Championship.

Following RevPro events being hindered due to the COVID-19 pandemic, Ospreay made his first title defence on 4 October at RevPro Epic Encounters 3, defeating Kyle Fletcher. On 15 November 2020, Ospreay made another defence, defeating Ricky Knight Jr. at RevPro Epic Encounters 5. The following year at RevPro's Ninth Anniversary on 21 August 2021, Ospreay defended his title against Doug Williams. A month later, Ospreay once again defeated Knight Jr a title vs title match to unify Ospreay's Undisputed British Heavyweight Championship and Knight Jr's British Heavyweight Championship. Ospreay made his final title defence of the year, defeating Shota Umino at RevPro Uprising 2021.

Ospreay made his first title defence of 2022, defeating Michael Oku at RevPro High Stakes 2022. His next title defence was against Mike Bailey on night 1 of RevPro's 10th Anniversary show on 20 August. On Night 2 the following day, Ospreay lost the Undisputed British Heavyweight Championship to Ricky Knight Jr, ending his reign at 919 days, 7 successful title defences, and making Ospreay the longest-reigning Undisputed British Heavyweight Champion in history.

Ospreay returned to RevPro for the first time since losing his title at Revpro Uprising 2022 in December, defeating Tomohiro Ishii. Ospreay made sporadic appearances for RevPro for the remainder of 2023, defeating the likes of Big Damo, Luke Jacobs and Eddie Dennis. Ospreay had a standout match on 9 July at RevPro Epic Encounter, defeating Leon Slater. On 26 August, at RevPro 11th Anniversary Show, Ospreay defeated Shingo Takagi, ahead of his match against Chris Jericho at All Elite Wrestling's (AEW) All In at Wembley Stadium, leading to Jericho making an appearance at the show and attacking Ospreay. At RevPro Uprising on 16 December, Ospreay defeated Gabe Kidd. Following the match, Ospreay announced that ahead of his recent signing to AEW, 18 February 2024 would be his final RevPro event. On 18 February, Ospreay unsuccessfully challenged Michael Oku for the Undisputed British Heavyweight Championship at High Stakes.

On 11 August 2024, Ospreay made a one-night return to RevPro and attacked MJF, who he was feuding with at the time in All Elite Wrestling. Ospreay also made another appearance on 29 August 2026 at RevPro's 14th Anniversary event, teaming with CPF (Danny Black, Maverick Mayhew, Joe Lando, and Callum Newman) to defeat Will Kaven, Mark Trew, Kieron Lacey, and Ricky Knight Jr..

=== Total Nonstop Action Wrestling (2016) ===
On 29 January 2016, Ospreay made his debut for Total Nonstop Action Wrestling (TNA), during the promotion's tour of the United Kingdom. Ospreay unsuccessfully entered the 2016 Joker's Wild tournament and challenged for both the TNA King of the Mountain Championship and TNA World Tag Team Championship. Dave Meltzer of the Wrestling Observer Newsletter reported that TNA had plans to push Ospreay, but upon finding out that he had signed to appear for NJPW, relegated him to a short match on their secondary television programme.

=== International promotions (2016–2022) ===
On 1 April 2016, Ospreay made his debut for Evolve, losing to Zack Sabre Jr. at Evolve 58 and Ricochet at Evolve 59, both in Dallas, Texas, USA. On 12 July, Paul Heyman, during a speaking tour of the United Kingdom, offered Ospreay an Evolve contract on behalf of Gabe Sapolsky while clarifying that the contract did not affect his NJPW deal. On 20 July, Pro Wrestling Torch reported Ospreay had signed the contract to make Evolve his American home promotion, but the Wrestling Observer Newsletter disputed this, reporting Ospreay did not sign and was still in talks with Evolve, PWG, TNA, and ROH, another American promotion who had a relationship with NJPW which Ospreay later confirmed.

In August 2017, Ospreay made his debut appearance for Pro Wrestling Australia (PWA) at their Sydney event Call to Arms. Originally scheduled to face PWA Heavyweight Champion Robbie Eagles in a non-title match for the main event, Eagles made the last-minute decision to put his title on the line. Ospreay ultimately defeated Eagles and won the PWA Heavyweight Championship for the first time. Afterwards, Ospreay announced that he was moving to Australia and began working regularly for PWA and other local independent promotions. Ospreay stated that he felt he could help the Australian wrestling scene grow, while the U.K. scene did not need him. Days later, Ospreay faced Adam Brooks in the main event of a Melbourne City Wrestling show, Ballroom Brawl; defeating him to win the MCW Intercommonwealth Championship.

From 2018 to 2022, Ospreay continue to wrestle for MCW in Australia and for various promotions in the United States, such as Warrior Wrestling, House of Glory (HOG), Northeast Wrestling, and Game Changer Wrestling (GCW).

=== New Japan Pro-Wrestling (2016–2024) ===
==== IWGP Junior Heavyweight Champion (2016–2018) ====
After the Global Wars UK event, where Ospreay faced Kazuchika Okada, New Japan wrestlers Hiroshi Tanahashi, AJ Styles and Okada recommended him to NJPW. On 3 March 2016, Ospreay was announced as the newest member of the NJPW stable Chaos. Appearing in a video, Ospreay challenged Kushida to an IWGP Junior Heavyweight Championship match at Invasion Attack 2016 on 10 April. On 10 April, Ospreay failed in his title challenge against Kushida. Following the match, it was reported that NJPW had offered Ospreay a contract to become a regular for the promotion.

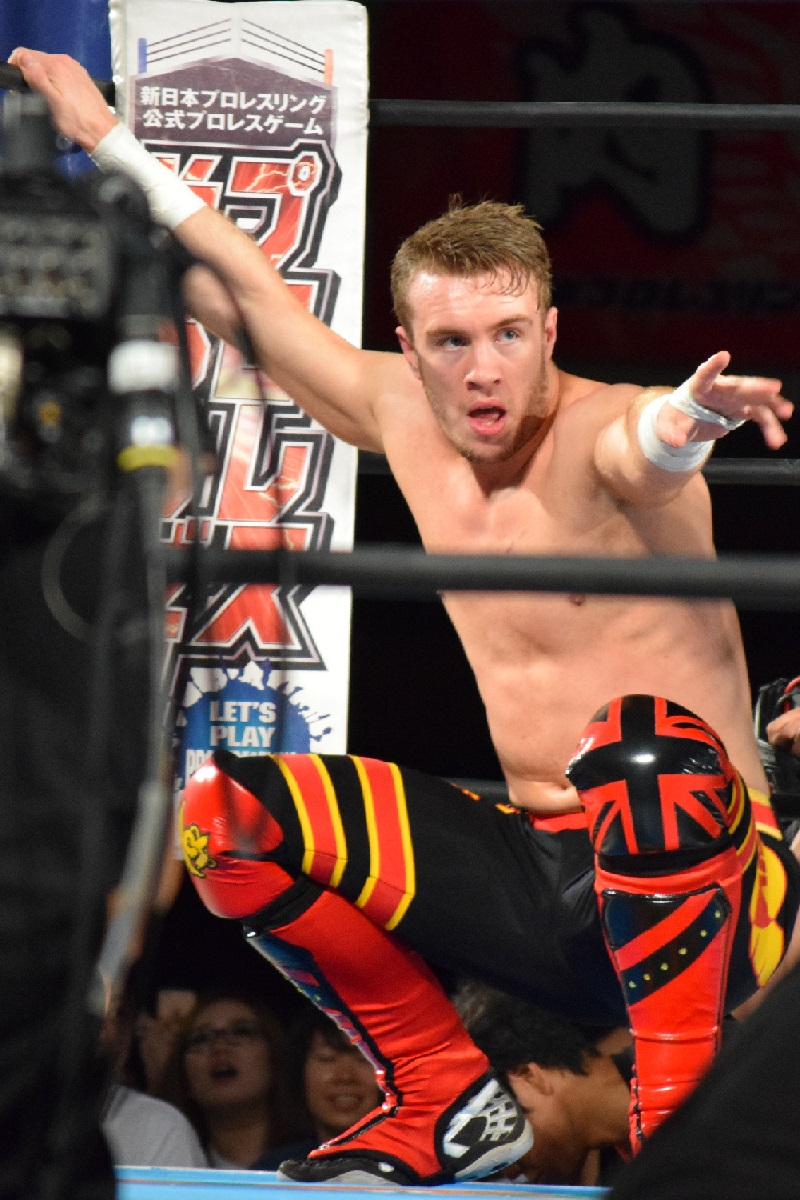
Ospreay at the 2016 Best of the Super Juniors tournament

The following month, Ospreay entered the 2016 Best of the Super Juniors tournament. On 27 May, Ospreay faced Ricochet in the tournament in a match that received widespread attention in the professional wrestling world, including praise from veterans like William Regal. Vader, however, compared the match to a "gymnastics routine". Ospreay won his block in the tournament with a record of four wins and three losses, advancing to the finals. On 7 June, Ospreay defeated Ryusuke Taguchi in the finals to win the 2016 Best of the Super Juniors, becoming the youngest winner in the history of the tournament as well as the first English and the fifth gaijin wrestler to win tournament. Following the win, Ospreay was granted another shot at the IWGP Junior Heavyweight Championship, but was again defeated by Kushida on 19 June at Dominion 6.19 in Osaka-jo Hall.

On 20 July, Ospreay entered the 2016 Super J-Cup, defeating Consejo Mundial de Lucha Libre (CMLL) representative Titán in his first round match. On 21 August, he was eliminated from the tournament in the second round by Matt Sydal. On 8 October, Ospreay received his first shot at the NEVER Openweight 6-Man Tag Team Championship, but he and his Chaos stablemates Beretta and Rocky Romero were defeated by the defending champions David Finlay, Ricochet, and Satoshi Kojima. On 11 February 2017 at The New Beginning in Osaka, Ospreay unsuccessfully challenged Katsuyori Shibata for the British Heavyweight Championship. In May, Ospreay won his block in the 2017 Best of the Super Juniors tournament with a record of five wins and two losses, advancing to his second consecutive final. On 3 June, Ospreay was defeated in the final by Kushida.

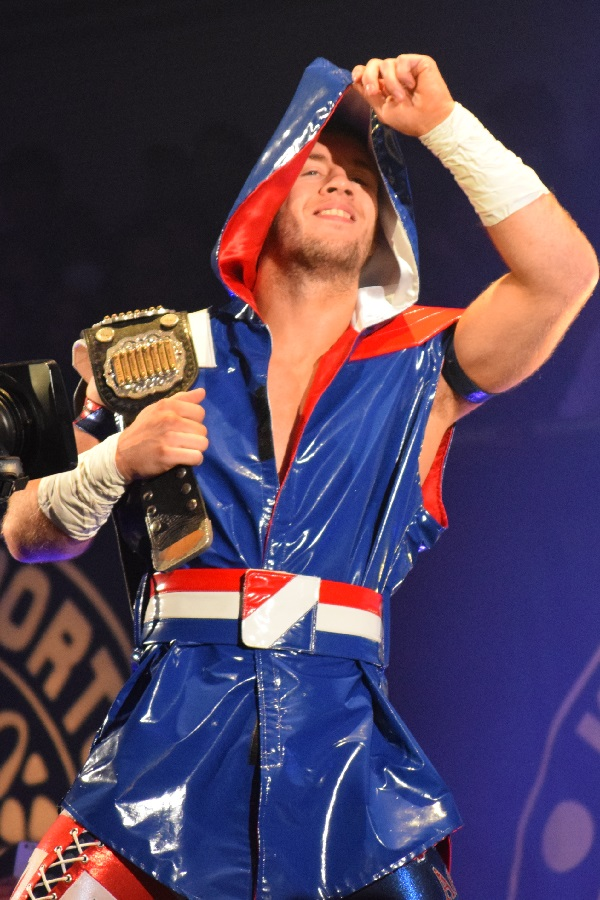
Ospreay as the IWGP Junior Heavyweight Champion in November 2017

On 9 October at King of Pro-Wrestling, Ospreay defeated Kushida to win the IWGP Junior Heavyweight Championship for the first time, becoming the first British holder of the title, but he lost the title to Marty Scurll in his first defence on 5 November at Power Struggle. Ospreay regained the title from Scurll on 4 January 2018 at Wrestle Kingdom 12 in Tokyo Dome in a four-way match that involved Hiromu Takahashi and Kushida. On 10 February, Ospreay retained the title against Hiromu Takahashi at The New Beginning in Osaka, and retained it in rematch against Marty Scurll at Sakura Genesis on 1 April. During the latter match, Ospreay was legitimately injured after his foot hit the rope mid-rotation after attempting a Spanish Fly off of the ring apron, causing him to land on his head on top of the apron and begin bleeding profusely from his scalp. After successfully retaining his title at Wrestling Dontaku 2018 in a rematch against Kushida, he was attacked by the newest Bullet Club member, Taiji Ishimori. Ospreay entered the 2018 Best of the Super Juniors, finishing the tournament with 5 wins and 2 losses, but didn't advance to the finals due to his loss against Ishimori on the first day of the tournament. Ospreay lost the IWGP Junior Heavyweight Championship to the tournament winner, Hiromu Takahashi, at Dominion 6.9 in Osaka-jo Hall on 9 June in his fourth defence. At Fighting Spirit Unleashed, Ospreay entered a tournament to crown a new IWGP Junior Heavyweight Champion, due to Takahashi getting a neck injury and forcing him to vacate the belt, and lost against Marty Scurll.

==== Transition to heavyweight (2018–2020) ====
At King of Pro-Wrestling, Ospreay teamed with Hirooki Goto and Tomohiro Ishii in a winning effort against Suzuki-gun, represented by Minoru Suzuki, Takashi Iizuka, and NEVER Openweight Champion Taichi, where Ospreay pinned Taichi for the win. After the match, Ospreay called out Taichi for a championship match, which hinted at him going to the Heavyweight division. The match was made official for Power Struggle (2018); however, it was announced on Twitter that the match had been cancelled due to Ospreay's injury. On the final day of World Tag League, Ospreay returned to New Japan, where he defeated Taichi. On the same night, he challenged the new NEVER Openweight Champion, Kota Ibushi, to a championship match at Wrestle Kingdom 13 on 4 January. At Wrestle Kingdom, Ospreay defeated Ibushi for the title, becoming the first Junior Heavyweight to hold the championship.

Ospreay made his first successful title defence at RevPro New Year's Resolution against Chris Brookes, and retained it again successfully against Dalton Castle at Honor Rising: Japan 2018 on 22 February. At New Japan's Anniversary Show, he faced IWGP Heavyweight Champion Jay White in a losing effort. Despite still being classified as a Junior Heavyweight, Ospreay entered the 2019 New Japan Cup, defeating Bad Luck Fale and Lance Archer before being eliminated by fellow Chaos member Kazuchika Okada. It was announced that Ospreay will face ROH Television Champion Jeff Cobb in a winner-takes-all match at G1 Supercard. At the event, Ospreay lost the match and his title to Cobb.

Ospreay participated in the 2019 edition of Best of the Super Juniors, where he won his block with a record of 7–2, advancing to the final. In the preliminary rounds, he suffered losses against long-time rivals Robbie Eagles and El Phantasmo. On 5 June, Ospreay defeated Shingo Takagi to win the tournament for the second time, earning an IWGP Junior Heavyweight Championship match at Dominion. The match between Ospreay and Shingo was awarded a 5.75 rating by Dave Meltzer of the Wrestling Observer Newsletter, the highest rating for a wrestling match in 2019. This was also the first match in which Takagi was pinned after his debut in NJPW. At Dominion, Ospreay defeated Dragon Lee to win the IWGP Junior Heavyweight Championship for the third time in his career. With this wrestling match being awarded 5 stars, Dave Meltzer and Bryan Alvarez suggested that Ospreay had reached a point in his career where he was a serious contender for being the best wrestler in the world. After winning the title, Ospreay announced his intention to enter the G1 Climax 29 in his quest of bridging the gap between heavyweight and junior heavyweight wrestlers. Later that week, Ospreay was announced as a participant in the G1, while also making his first title defence against Robbie Eagles at Southern Showdown in Melbourne.

He started the G1 Climax campaign at G1 Climax in Dallas, where he was defeated by Lance Archer. He obtained his first win by defeating Sanada, but lost in the third round of the tournament against Kota Ibushi. Between the second and the third round, he suffered a legit injury that almost made him unable to participate further in the G1 Climax, but nevertheless, he managed to get cleared in a very short amount of time. Afterwards, Ospreay faced Chaos leader Kazuchika Okada in the main event of Night 7 of the G1 Climax, yet lost in another well-received match. On 4 January 2020, at Wrestle Kingdom 14, Ospreay lost the IWGP Junior Heavyweight Championship to Hiromu Takahashi, during which he suffered a heel injury, reportedly from landing on his feet when Takahashi dropped him from the top rope.

==== United Empire (2020–2024) ====
On 2 February, at The New Beginning in Sapporo, Ospreay was unsuccessful at winning the British Heavyweight Championship from Zack Sabre Jr. On 4 February, during the Road to New Beginning tour, Ospreay pinned Sabre Jr. in a tag team match between Chaos and Suzuki-gun. After the match, Ospreay challenged Sabre Jr. to another match for the title, which was scheduled at RevPro's High Stakes event. At the event, Ospreay defeated Sabre Jr. to win the British Heavyweight Championship. After the match, Ospreay announced that he will be moving to New Japan's Heavyweight division.

Ospreay was supposed to be part of the 2020 New Japan Cup starting on 4 March; however, NJPW suspended all of its activities in late February due to the COVID-19 pandemic. Although the company eventually resumed its activities with the New Japan Cup in June, travel limitations due to the pandemic have prevented most foreign wrestlers from returning to Japan. Ospreay made his return in September, where he participated in his second G1 Climax in the A Block, and ended his run with twelve points. At night 17 of the G1 Climax, Ospreay defeated Kazuchika Okada after interference from Ospreay's girlfriend Bea Priestley and the returning young lion Great-O-Khan. After the match, Ospreay attacked Okada, turning heel, leaving Chaos, and forming a new stable called United Empire. Ospreay then won the 2021 New Japan Cup, earning him the right to challenge Kota Ibushi for the newly-unified IWGP World Heavyweight Championship at Sakura Genesis. At the event, Ospreay defeated Ibushi to win the IWGP World Heavyweight Championship for the first time, becoming the first British holder of NJPW's top championship and became the fourth wrestler to win the IWGP Junior Heavyweight and IWGP Heavyweight Championships. At Wrestling Dontaku, Ospreay made his first defence of the title when he defeated Shingo Takagi. However, he suffered a neck injury during the match and was forced to vacate the title on 20 May 2021.

Just three months after his injury, Ospreay made a surprise return at Resurgence on 14 August, and delivered a promo declaring himself the true IWGP World Heavyweight Champion as he was never beaten for the title and revealed an identical belt. He also claimed to recognize IWGP World Heavyweight Champion Shingo Takagi to be an "Interim champion", and that he would compete on New Japan's American show Strong rather than participate in G1 Climax 31. In the build-up to Wrestle Kingdom 16, it was announced that Ospreay would face Night 1's main event winner in Night 2's main event on 5 January to unify the World Championships. On 4 January, Kazuchika Okada defeated Shingo Takagi to win the World Championship. On 5 January, Okada defeated Ospreay to win and unify both World Championships.

After his defeat, Ospreay stuck around in Japan, teaming with his United Empire teammates. Ospreay was announced for that year's New Japan Cup, where he defeated Bushi, El Phantasmo and IWGP United States Heavyweight Champion Sanada to make it to the tournament quarterfinals. During his third-round match, Ospreay fractured Sanada's orbital bone, resulting in a referee stoppage. In the quarterfinal round, he lost to the eventual winner Zack Sabre Jr. After the tournament, at Hyper Battle, it was announced Sanada was forced to vacate the US title, and Ospreay expressed interest in fighting for the vacant title, along with former champion Hiroshi Tanahashi. Ospreay returned to the NJPW United States shows on 16 April at Windy City Riot to face Jon Moxley, who Ospreay had called out at Resurgence and in post-match interviews during his New Japan Cup run. At the event, he was defeated. Ospreay challenged for the US title at Capital Collision on 14 May in a four-way match, involving Tanahashi, Moxley and Juice Robinson, but failed to win the championship after being pinned by Robinson. Ospreay, along with Sanada, was set to get another title shot, at Dominion 6.12 in Osaka-jo Hall on 12 June in a Three-way match; however, when Robinson had to vacate the championship due to his appendicitis, Ospreay faced Sanada one-on-one for the vacant championship, where he was victorious, although he didn't possess the championship belt, due to former champion Robinson refusing to give it back.

Also during Dominion, Ospreay was announced as a participant in the G1 Climax 32 tournament starting in July, as a part of the D block. Ospreay scored 8 points in his block, advancing to the semi-finals and gaining the physical IWGP United States Championship belt from Robinson, and David Finlay, who both competed in the D Block. In the semi-final round, Ospreay defeated C Block winner Tetsuya Naito to advance to the tournament finals., but lost in the finals to Okada.

Following his G1 loss, Ospreay continued to defend his IWGP United States Heavyweight Championship, avenging a D-Block G1 loss to Finlay and defeating him at NJPW Burning Spirit in September. In October at Royal Quest II, Ospreay defeated Shota Umino. At Battle Autumn in November, Ospreay again retained the title, defeating Naito once more. After his defence against Naito, Ospreay was confronted by Umino, who made his return to Japan and was struck down by him. Umino challenged Ospreay for the U.S. Championship at Historic X-Over, but Ospreay successfully retained again. After the match, Kenny Omega of All Elite Wrestling appeared on the titantron, belittling Ospreay, and challenged him championship at Wrestle Kingdom 17, which Ospreay accepted. Ospreay lost the championship to Omega at Wrestle Kingdom, ending his reign at 206 days.

Ospreay attempted to rebound by entering the 2023 New Japan Cup in March. Ospreay received a bye to the second round, where he defeated United Empire stablemate Mark Davis to advance to the quarterfinals. However, it was announced soon after that Ospreay had suffered a shoulder injury and would forfeit his place in the tournament, causing Davis to take his place and advance to the next round. In April, NJPW announced a tournament to find a new number one contender for Kenny Omega's IWGP United States Heavyweight Championship, where Ospreay was announced as one of four participants in the tournament, signalling his return from injury. Ospreay returned to action on 21 May at Resurgence, where he defeated Hiroshi Tanahashi to advance to the tournament final. The tournament final commenced at Dominion 6.4 in Osaka-jo Hall the following month, where Ospreay defeated Lance Archer to become number one contender for Omega's title. On 6 June at a NJPW press conference, the rematch between Ospreay and Omega for the title was confirmed to take place later in the month at AEW's Forbidden Door, and Ospreay defeated Omega at the event on 25 February to regain the IWGP United States Heavyweight Championship for a second time.

In July, Ospreay attempted to maintain his momentum by entering the yearly G1 Climax tournament, competing in the B Block. Despite losing to Taichi on the first night, Ospreay finally and cleanly defeated longtime rival and former teammate Kazuchika Okada. Ospreay finished with 10 points, making him the block runner-up and therefore advancing him to the quarterfinal round. In the quarterfinals, Ospreay defeated David Finlay but lost to eventual tournament winner Tetsuya Naito in the semi-finals, eliminating him from the tournament. Following the match, Ospreay claimed to be tired of holding a title which he had "no attachment to". He then discarded the IWGP United States Heavyweight belt and unveiled a custom one featuring Union Jacks, naming it the "IWGP United Kingdom Heavyweight Championship". Despite this, New Japan never officially renamed the title, and Ospreay later began carrying both belts to represent the IWGP United States Heavyweight Championship.

On 17 September, Ospreay competed in an inter-promotional match against Naomichi Marufuji of Pro Wrestling Noah at the latter's 25th Anniversary show, marking his Pro Wrestling Noah debut. Prior to the event, Ospreay claimed the match to be a "dream match" for himself, having idolised Marufuji during his career. At the event, Ospreay defeated Marufuji. Back in NJPW, Ospreay successfully defended the IWGP United Kingdom Heavyweight Championship against Yota Tsuji at Destruction in Kobe. The following month, Ospreay defended his championship against NJPW World Television Champion, Zack Sabre Jr., at Royal Quest III, and Shota Umino at Power Struggle, the month after. After defeating Umino, Ospreay was confronted by former IWGP United States Heavyweight Champion, AEW's Jon Moxley. Before a challenge could be laid out, both men were attacked by the new Bullet Club leader, David Finlay, who used a mallet to destroy both the IWGP United States Heavyweight Championship and the IWGP United Kingdom Heavyweight Championship belts. Finlay's manager Gedo then challenged Ospreay and Moxley to a three-way match, on Finlay's behalf, for a brand new championship at Wrestle Kingdom 18. Soon after the match was made official by NJPW. The IWGP United States Heavyweight Championship was retired on 11 December, ending Ospreay's second title reign at 169 days and making him the final champion. The match at Wrestle Kingdom 18 was then announced to be for the newly created IWGP Global Heavyweight Championship instead. At Wrestle Kingdom 18, Ospreay failed to win the new title, as it was won by Finlay.

Following Wrestle Kingdom, Ospreay continued to feud with Finlay, where United Empire and Finlay's Bullet Club War Dogs uncontrollably brawled at New Year Dash!!, causing a no-contest. After the two teams were separated, Ospreay challenged Bullet Club War Dogs to a match against United Empire at The New Beginning in Osaka on 11 February, allowing Finlay to pick the stipulation. Finlay chose a Steel cage match, which was made official. Before this final NJPW match, Ospreay faced Kazuchika Okada at Battle in the Valley on 13 January, but lost. After the match, the two former stablemates embraced in the ring. At New Beginning in Osaka, United Empire was defeated by Bullet Club War Dogs in the 10-man steel cage match. After the match, Ospreay thanked the NJPW fans and promised to return to the promotion one day, before embracing his United Empire stablemates in the ring.

=== Ring of Honor (2016–2018) ===
On 8 November 2016, Ring of Honor (ROH) announced that Ospreay had signed a contract with the promotion, which went into effect on 1 December. On 18 November, Ospreay defeated Bobby Fish in his ROH debut match in Liverpool to become the new ROH World Television Champion. He lost the title to Marty Scurll two days later, during the final day of ROH's three-day tour of the United Kingdom. Ospreay had been given another opportunity to regain the title in a four corners match at ROH's December pay-per-view, Final Battle 2016, but Scurll retained his title. At Final Battle 2017, Ospreay was defeated by Matt Taven. On 15 September 2018 episode of ROH TV, Jay Lethal issued an open challenge, which Ospreay answered. The match was signed for ROH Death Before Dishonor later that month, in which Ospreay lost.

=== Frontline Wrestling (2018–2019) ===
In 2018, Ospreay announced that the start of his own promotion, Frontline Wrestling. He described Frontline as a British Puroresu-style company that wants to take wrestling in England back to being seen as a sport. On 28 June 2018, they ran their first event, "Build Me An Empire". Upon the promotion's one-year anniversary, Ospreay sold Frontline to move to Japan and pursue a full-time schedule in New Japan Pro Wrestling.

=== All Elite Wrestling (2022–present) ===
==== Sporadic appearances (2022–2023) ====
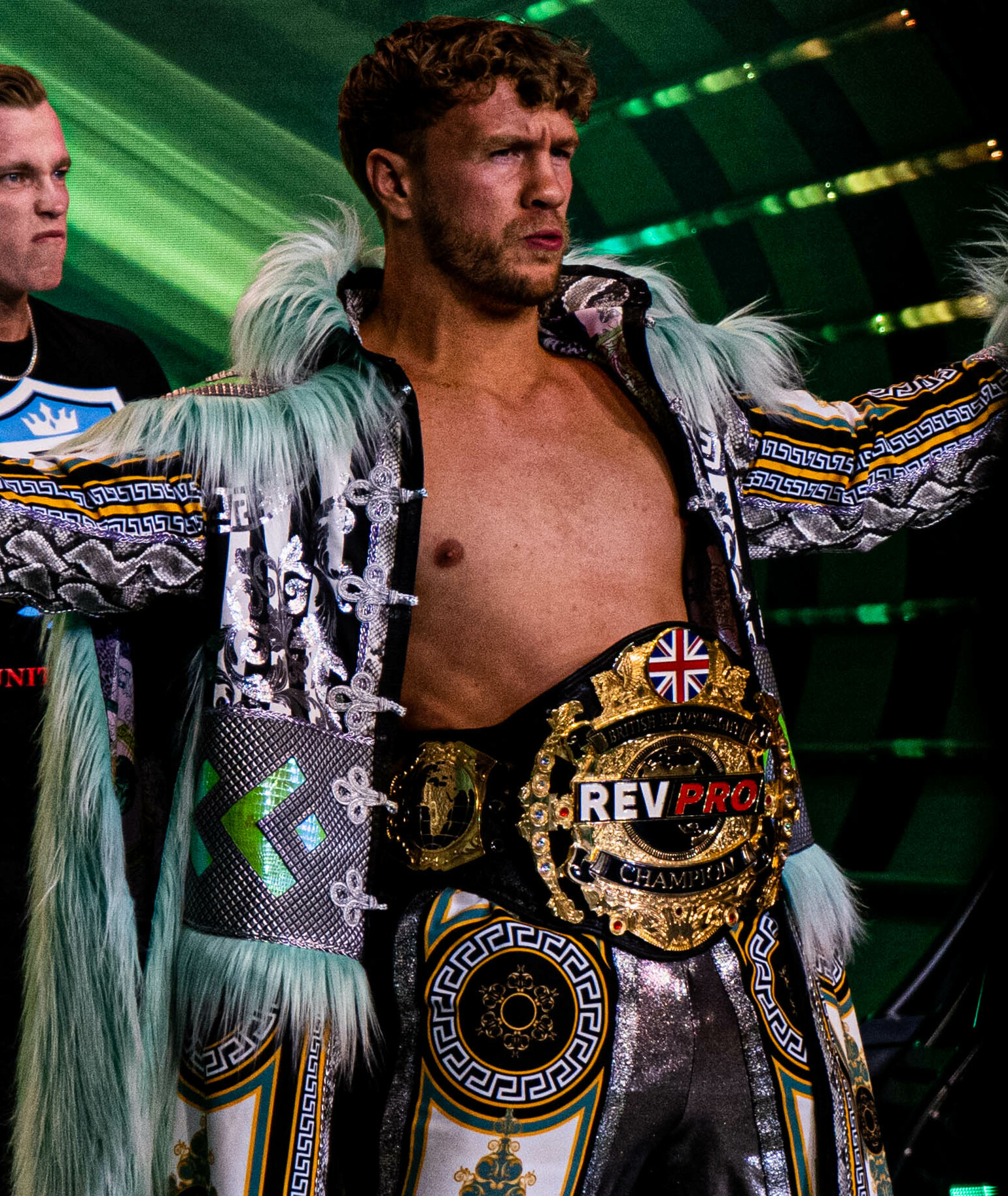
Ospreay at Forbidden Door in 2022

While still signed with New Japan Pro-Wrestling, Ospreay made his surprise debut for All Elite Wrestling (AEW) on 8 June 2022 episode of Dynamite, where he, along with United Empire stablemates Aaron Henare, and Aussie Open (Kyle Fletcher and Mark Davis), attacked Trent Beretta and FTR. On 10 June 2022 episode of Rampage, Beretta and FTR picked up a victory against Ospreay and Aussie Open. Ospreay competed in his first singles match on 15 June special episode of Dynamite, Road Rager, where he defeated Dax Harwood. After the match, Ospreay and his United Empire stablemates attacked FTR and Roppongi Vice once more, only to be interrupted by Orange Cassidy, who stared down Ospreay. Soon after, a singles match between both men was scheduled for AEW and NJPW's collaborative show Forbidden Door, for Ospreay's newly won IWGP United States Heavyweight Championship. At the event, Ospreay successfully defended the title against Cassidy. After the match, Ospreay and Aussie Open attacked Cassidy and Roppongi Vice, only to be stopped by Katsuyori Shibata, who attacked the trio.

On 27 July, the AEW World Trios Championship was revealed, with Ospreay and Aussie Open being named as participants in the tournament to crown the inaugural champions. On 24 August, Ospreay and Aussie Open defeated Death Triangle to progress to the semifinals, where they were defeated by The Elite (Kenny Omega and The Young Bucks) on 31 August. After the match, United Empire attacked The Elite.

Ospreay returned to AEW on 14 June 2023 episode of Dynamite, attacking IWGP United States Heavyweight Champion Kenny Omega at the end of the show, ahead of the two men's upcoming match at Forbidden Door. On the same week's episode of Rampage, Ospreay teamed with United Empire stablemates Jeff Cobb and Kyle Fletcher to defeat Chaos (Trent Beretta, Chuck Taylor and Rocky Romero).

==== Don Callis Family (2023–2024) ====
Ospreay returned to AEW on 16 August episode of Dynamite, aiding Don Callis by attacking Chris Jericho alongside Konosuke Takeshita, before being chased off by Jericho's ally Sammy Guevara. Later in the show, Jericho challenged Ospreay to a match at All In at Wembley Stadium. At All In, Ospreay defeated Jericho with the Stormbreaker. As a member of the Don Callis Family, Ospreay teamed with Konosuke Takeshita and Sammy Guevara, who had since betrayed Chris Jericho to join Callis, to face Jericho, Kenny Omega, and Kota Ibushi in a six-man tag-team match at WrestleDream on 1 October. At the event, Ospreay, Takeshita, and Guevara were victorious.

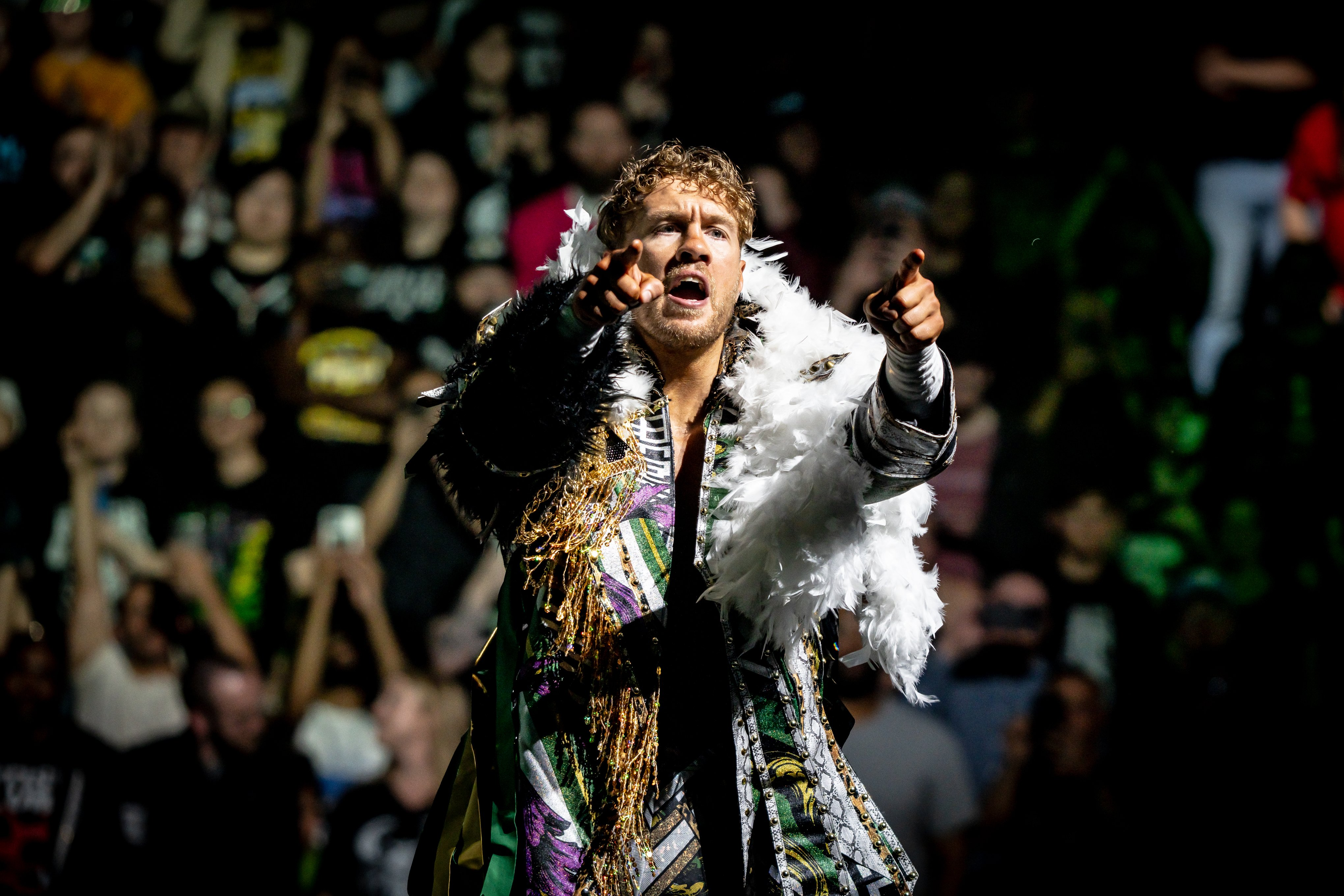
Ospreay making his entrance at AEW Revolution 2024

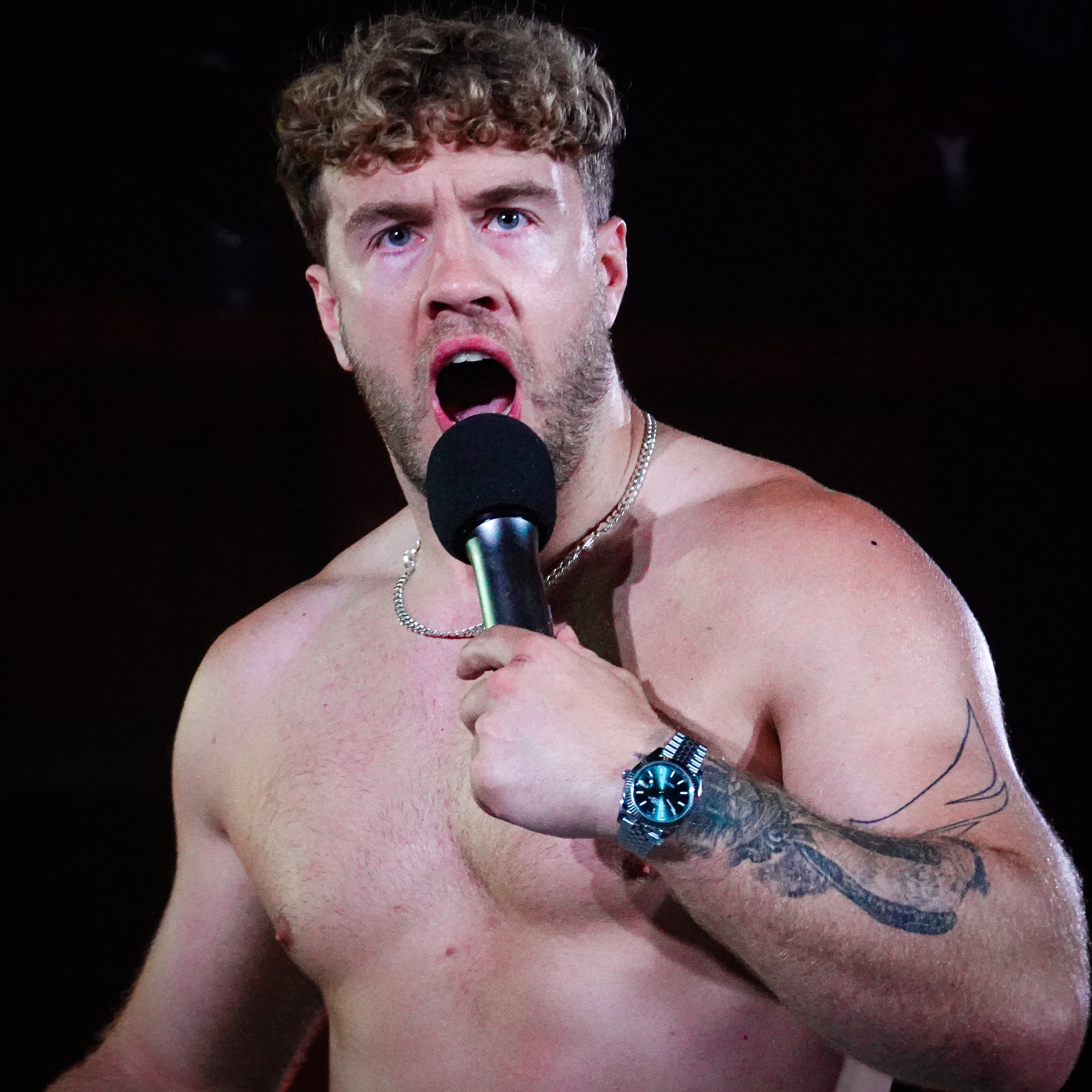
Ospreay in August 2024

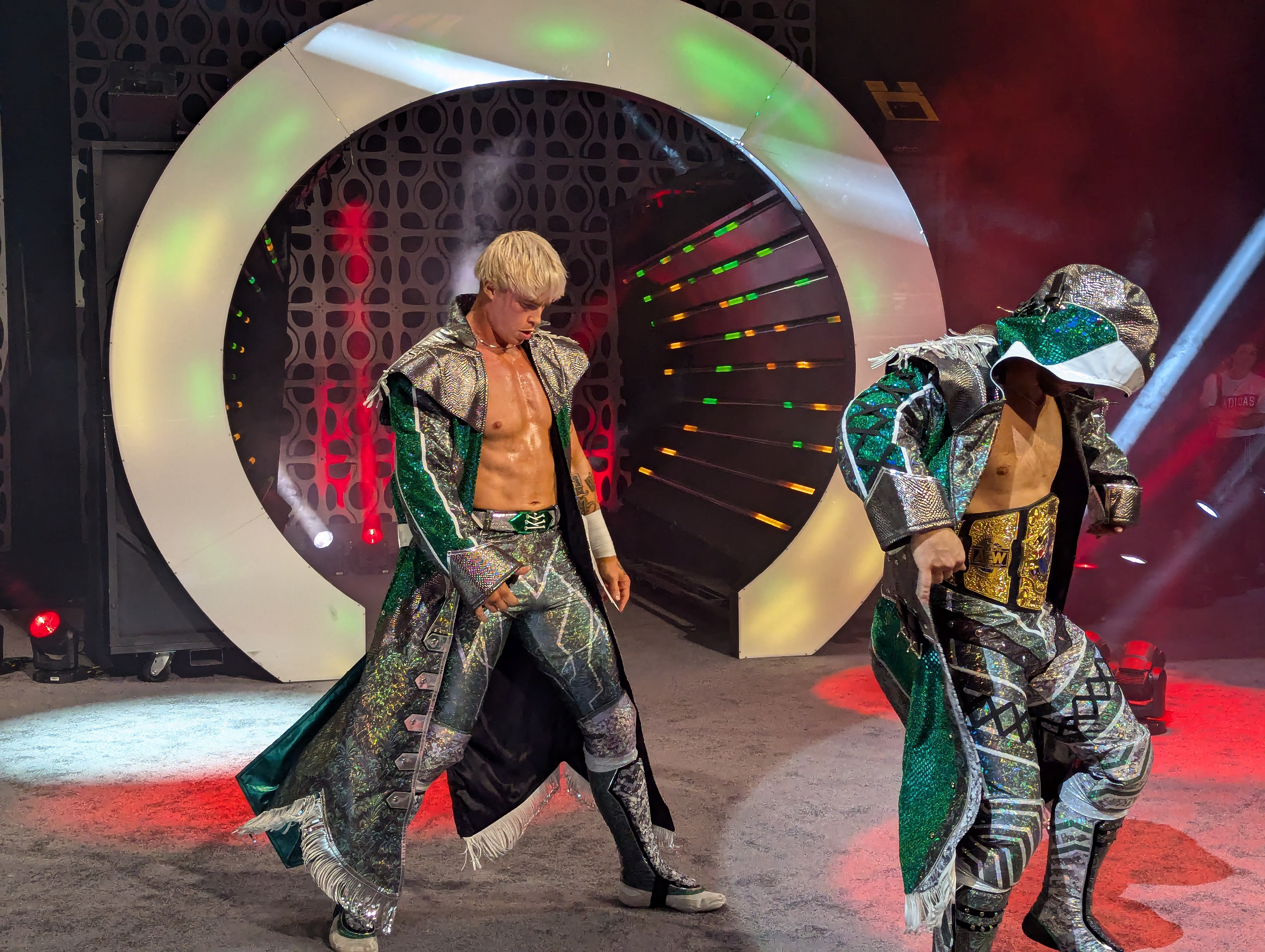
Ospreay (right) teaming with Kyle Fletcher in 2024

On 18 November at Full Gear, it was revealed that Ospreay had signed a multi-year deal with All Elite Wrestling, with AEW President Tony Khan touting his acquisition as a "blockbuster signing". He officially joined the AEW roster in February 2024. Ospreay's contract allowed him to reside in the United Kingdom and also make select appearances for NJPW. Ospreay's first match as an AEW-contracted wrestler took place on 3 March 2024 at Revolution, defeating fellow Don Callis Family stablemate, Konosuke Takeshita. On 21 April at Dynasty, Ospreay defeated Bryan Danielson. This match was rated 6.5 stars by Dave Meltzer, which makes the match the second greatest match ever by his ratings, only behind Kazuchika Okada vs. Kenny Omega from Dominion 6.9.

On 24 April episode of Dynamite, Ospreay won a Casino Gauntlet Match, earning the right to challenge Roderick Strong for the AEW International Championship at Double or Nothing. At the event, Ospreay defeated Strong to win the International Championship, winning his first title in AEW. On 29 May episode of Dynamite, Ospreay won his second Casino Gauntlet Match, this time to earn the right to challenge Swerve Strickland for the AEW World Championship at Forbidden Door. On 1 June episode of Collision, Ospreay successfully defended his title in his first defence against Kyle O'Reilly. At Forbidden Door on 30 June, Ospreay lost to Strickland, failing to win the AEW World Championship and suffering his first singles loss in AEW. On 3 July episode of Dynamite, Ospreay left the Don Callis Family and successfully defended his International Championship against Daniel Garcia. Despite leaving The Don Callis Family, Ospreay remained aligned with member Kyle Fletcher.

==== Various feuds (2024–2026) ====
At Dynamite 250 on 17 July, Ospreay lost the International Championship to MJF, ending his reign at 52 days, only to win the title back on 25 August at All In. On 7 September at All Out, Ospreay successfully defended his title against Pac. On 11 September episode of Dynamite, Ospreay teamed with Kyle Fletcher to win a tag team Casino Gauntlet match to earn a shot at The Young Bucks' AEW World Tag Team Championship at Grand Slam on 25 September, but failed to win the titles at the event. On the fifth anniversary episode of Dynamite on 2 October, Ospreay defended his title against Ricochet; however, Konosuke Takeshita attacked both men, causing the match to end in a no contest. On 12 October at WrestleDream, Ospreay lost his title to Takeshita in a three-way match, also involving Ricochet, ending his second reign at 48 days. After the match, Ospreay was attacked by Kyle Fletcher, effectively ending their alliance.

On 23 November at Full Gear, Ospreay was defeated by Fletcher. The next day, Ospreay was announced as a participant in the 2024 Continental Classic, where he was placed in the Gold league. Ospreay finished the tournament with 9 points and advanced to the playoff stage on 28 December at Worlds End. At Worlds End, Ospreay defeated Fletcher in the semi-finals, but lost to eventual winner Kazuchika Okada in the finals. At Grand Slam Australia on 15 February 2025, Ospreay and Omega defeated Fletcher and Takeshita in a tag-team match. At Revolution on 9 March, Ospreay defeated Fletcher in a steel cage match to end their feud.

On 12 March episode of Dynamite, Ospreay announced his entry into the men's bracket of the Owen Hart Cup, a tournament where the winner received an AEW World Championship match at All In. In the quarterfinal round of the tournament, Ospreay defeated Kevin Knight at Dynasty on 6 April. At Dynamite: Spring BreakThru on 16 April, Ospreay defeated Konosuke Takeshita in the semifinal round, advancing to the finals on 25 May at Double or Nothing, where he lost to "Hangman" Adam Page. After Double or Nothing, Ospreay attempted to recruit Swerve Strickland to join him in assisting Page against the reigning AEW World Champion Jon Moxley and his Death Riders stable, but to no avail. After a match against Strickland that ended in a time-limit draw on 11 June at Dynamite: Summer Blockbuster, both men were attacked by The Young Bucks. At All In on 12 July, Ospreay and Strickland defeated The Young Bucks. Per the added stipulation of the match, The Young Bucks were stripped of their (kayfabe) executive vice presidents positions of AEW. On 24 August at Forbidden Door, Ospreay teamed with Darby Allin, Hiroshi Tanahashi, and the Golden Lovers (Kenny Omega and Kota Ibushi) to defeat the Death Riders, The Young Bucks, and Gabe Kidd in a lights out steel cage match. After the match, the Death Riders attacked Ospreay, writing him off television to allow him to heal a herniated disc in his C2 and C6 spine, for which he underwent a double fusion neck surgery.

On 15 March 2026, Ospreay returned from injury at Revolution and attacked the Death Riders after Jon Moxley had retained his AEW Continental Championship. On 12 April at Dynasty, Ospreay unsuccessfully challenged Moxley for the title. Following the event, Ospreay aligned with the Death Riders after accepting Moxley's offer to train him, with Moxley believing Ospreay had become mentally fragile following his injury and would continue to get hurt if he remained on his current path. Over the following weeks, Ospreay was shown training with and teaming alongside members of the Death Riders.

==== AEW World Champion (2026–present) ====
From May to June, Ospreay won the 2026 Owen Hart Cup, defeating Samoa Joe in the quarterfinal at Double or Nothing on 24 May, Mark Davis in the semifinal on 3 June episode of Dynamite, and Swerve Strickland in the grand final at Forbidden Door on 28 June. On 1 July episode of Dynamite, Ospreay officially joined the Death Riders, but betrayed the group at Redemption on 26 July after refusing to attack Kenny Omega and officially leave on the following episode of Dynamite after returning his Death Rider badge to Moxley. On 30 August at All In: London in Wembley Stadium, Ospreay defeated Omega to capture the AEW World Championship for the first time, while also becoming the first English-born wrestler to win a world championship in the United Kingdom and the second wrestler to kick out of Omega's finisher, the One-Winged Angel, for the first time in fourteen-years. (Note: MJF also kicked out of the move earlier in 2026, though this came after a long count.) On the following episode of Dynamite, Ospreay announced that he would be starting a branch of the United Empire in AEW, the stable that he originally founded and led in NJPW. Over the following weeks, Ospreay added Mike Bailey and The Brawling Birds (Alex Windsor and Jamie Hayter) to United Empire to go with Andrade El Idolo, who had joined the group in Japan. On September 26 at All Out, Ospreay successfully defended his title against Jon Moxley. In October, Ospreay successfully defended his title against long-time rival Kazuchika Okada at Grand Slam France on 6 October, and against seven other wrestlers at WrestleDream on 17 October in a Clockwork Carnage match after pinning Adam Copeland to secure the winning fall as time expired. On November 4, Ospreay competed in a six-on-six Blood and Guts match at the namesake event, where his team was defeated after Copeland surrendered on his behalf. On 14 November at Full Gear, Ospreay successfully defended his title against Kyle Fletcher.

=== Return to Impact Wrestling / TNA (2023–2024) ===
Through a working partnership between New Japan Pro-Wrestling (NJPW) and Impact Wrestling (formerly Total Nonstop Action Wrestling), Ospreay was announced to be making his return to Impact after seven years in October. Ospreay returned at Bound for Glory, on 21 October. Soon after, Ospreay's opponent was revealed to be Mike Bailey, in a match that was originally scheduled for Multiverse United, in March prior to Ospreay's injury. At the event, Ospreay defeated Bailey. On 27 October at Turning Point, Ospreay defeated Eddie Edwards. Ospreay's winning streak in Impact continued on 16 November, where Ospreay defeated Josh Alexander. Ospreay returned to Impact, which had now reverted to its original TNA name, in 2024, facing Josh Alexander in a rematch on 18 January 2024, which he lost.

=== Pro-Wrestling: EVE (2025–present) ===
On 13 February 2025, it was reported that Ospreay had begun working as a producer and member of the creative team for the independent women's wrestling promotion Pro-Wrestling: EVE.

=== Return to NJPW (2026–present) ===
On 4 January 2026, at Wrestle Kingdom 20, Ospreay made a surprise appearance in NJPW as part of Hiroshi Tanahashi's retirement ceremony. Following the event, he entered into a storyline at New Year Dash!! on 5 January with his former protégé and new leader of the United Empire, Callum Newman, promising to return to NJPW to support the stable. Newman later teased attacking Ospreay, but was restrained by Henare and Great-O-Khan. Ospreay returned to in-ring competition for NJPW at Sakura Genesis on 4 April, teaming with Great-O-Khan and Henare to defeat Yuya Uemura, Taichi and El Desperado. At Night 2 of Wrestling Dontaku on 4 May, Ospreay, Henare, and O-Khan defeated Bishamon-tin (Boltin Oleg, Hirooki Goto, and Yoshi-Hashi) to win the NEVER Openweight 6-Man Tag Team Championship. Later that night, after Callum Newman retained the IWGP Heavyweight Championship against Shingo Takagi, tensions between Ospreay and Newman escalated when Newman pressured Ospreay into attacking Takagi and criticized him for aligning himself with the Death Riders in AEW. On October 12 at King of Pro-Wrestling, Ospreay, Henare and O-Khan lost the titles to Unbound Co. (Yuto-Ice, Oskar, and Jeff Cobb), ending their reign at 161 days. On November 3 at Power Struggle, Ospreay and Newman failed to win the IWGP Tag Team Championship from the Knock Out Brothers after Newman caused a disqualification. Following the match, Ospreay and Newman brawled after months of tension before the latter challenged the former to a match at Wrestle Kingdom 21 which Ospreay accepted.

== Professional wrestling style and persona ==
Following a low blow, Ospreay uses the "Hidden Blade" to win a match against Amazing Red in 2021.

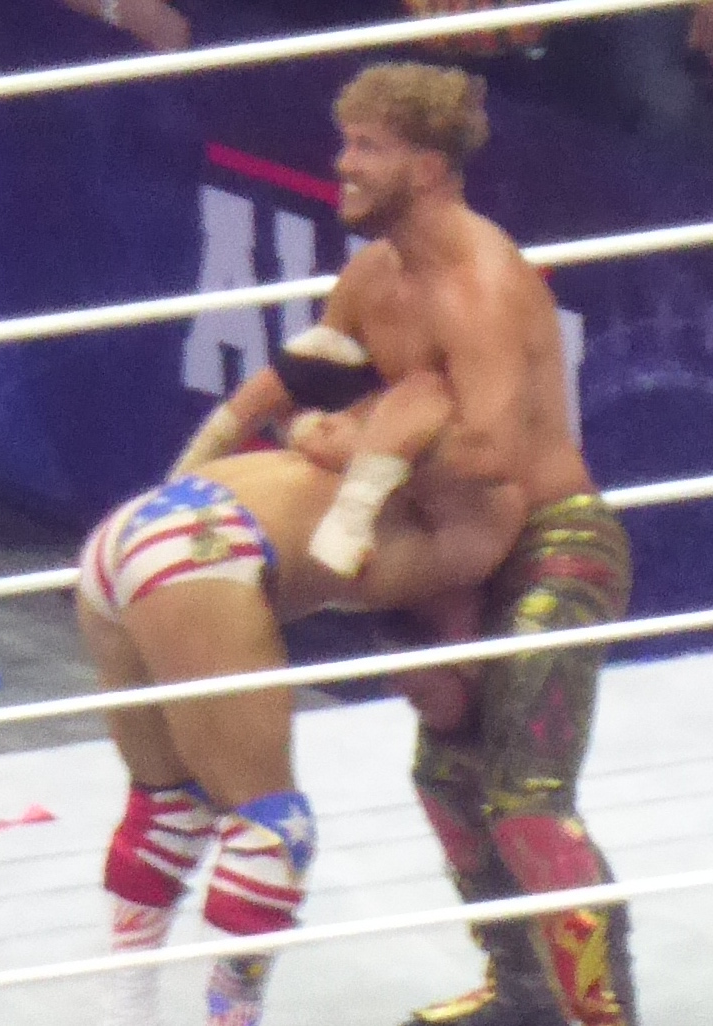
Ospreay performing the Tiger Driver '91 on MJF

Ospreay is known for his high-flying, high-risk style of wrestling, being nicknamed "The Aerial Assassin". He has said that this nickname is a reference to the Assassin's Creed video games and was a persona he adopted to stand out from other British high-flying wrestlers, particularly Pac. As a junior heavyweight, Ospreay used a springboard cutter named the OsCutter as his finishing maneuver. This high-risk style has caused concern about Ospreay's health and length of his career. This included a neck injury he suffered against Marty Scurll on 1 April 2018. He later decided to tone down his in-ring style after receiving advice from Chris Jericho in 2018.

After his match against Kota Ibushi at Wrestle Kingdom 13, Ospreay shortened his nickname to "The Assassin" and debuted a new finisher, a swinging back elbow he later named the Hidden Blade. Since his transition to the Heavyweight division in 2020, Ospreay bulked up in size and muscle and gave himself the new nickname "The Commonwealth Kingpin". This led to him changing his in-ring style, as he continued to use high-flying offence but incorporated more technical skill as well as powerful offence, which includes a butterfly neckbreaker dubbed the Stormbreaker. In 2023, he returned to "The Aerial Assassin" moniker and began using a kneeling double underhook powerbomb called the Tiger Driver '91. In 2026, he began using a armbar dubbed Death Ground.

== Personal life ==
Ospreay started a relationship with English-New Zealand wrestler Bea Priestley in 2017. They planned to move to Japan together because their careers were there, but had split up by 2021. Ospreay is in a relationship with fellow wrestler Alex Windsor and is the step-father to Windsor's son. Ospreay cited his desire to be able to raise his step-son in the United Kingdom as a major reason he signed with AEW instead of WWE in late 2023, as WWE would have required him to move to the United States, while AEW is willing to fly him in from the UK to all their events. Ospreay and Windsor married in June 2026.

Ospreay is dyslexic and has ADHD.

== Championships and accomplishments ==
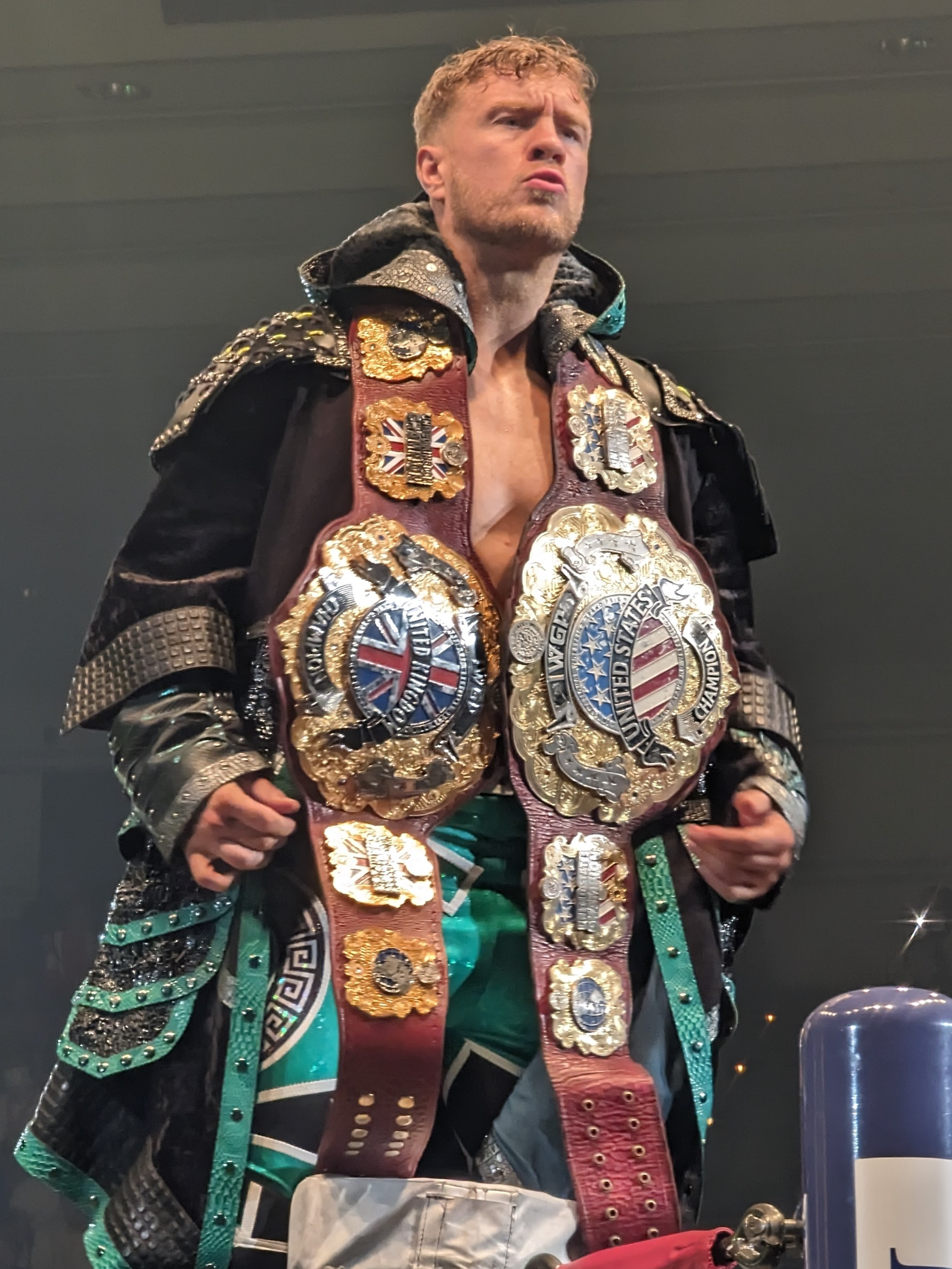
Ospreay with the "IWGP United Kingdom Heavyweight Championship" (left), his custom version of the IWGP United States Heavyweight Championship (right), which he held twice in NJPW

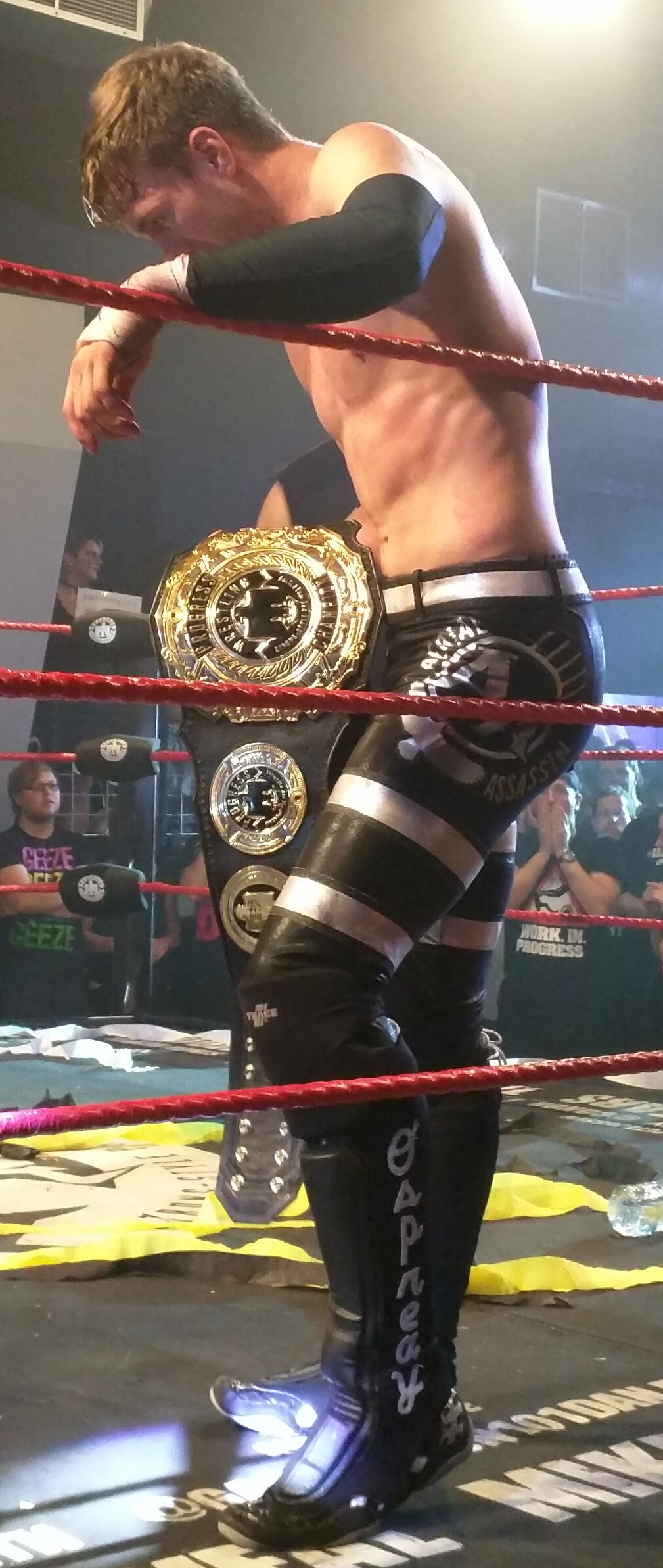
Ospreay as Progress Wrestling Champion

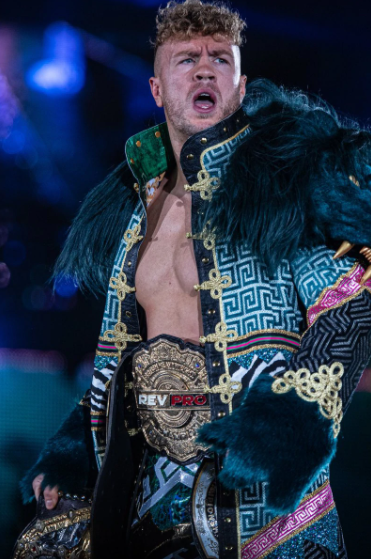
In RevPro, Ospreay is a former and longest reigning Undisputed British Heavyweight Champion

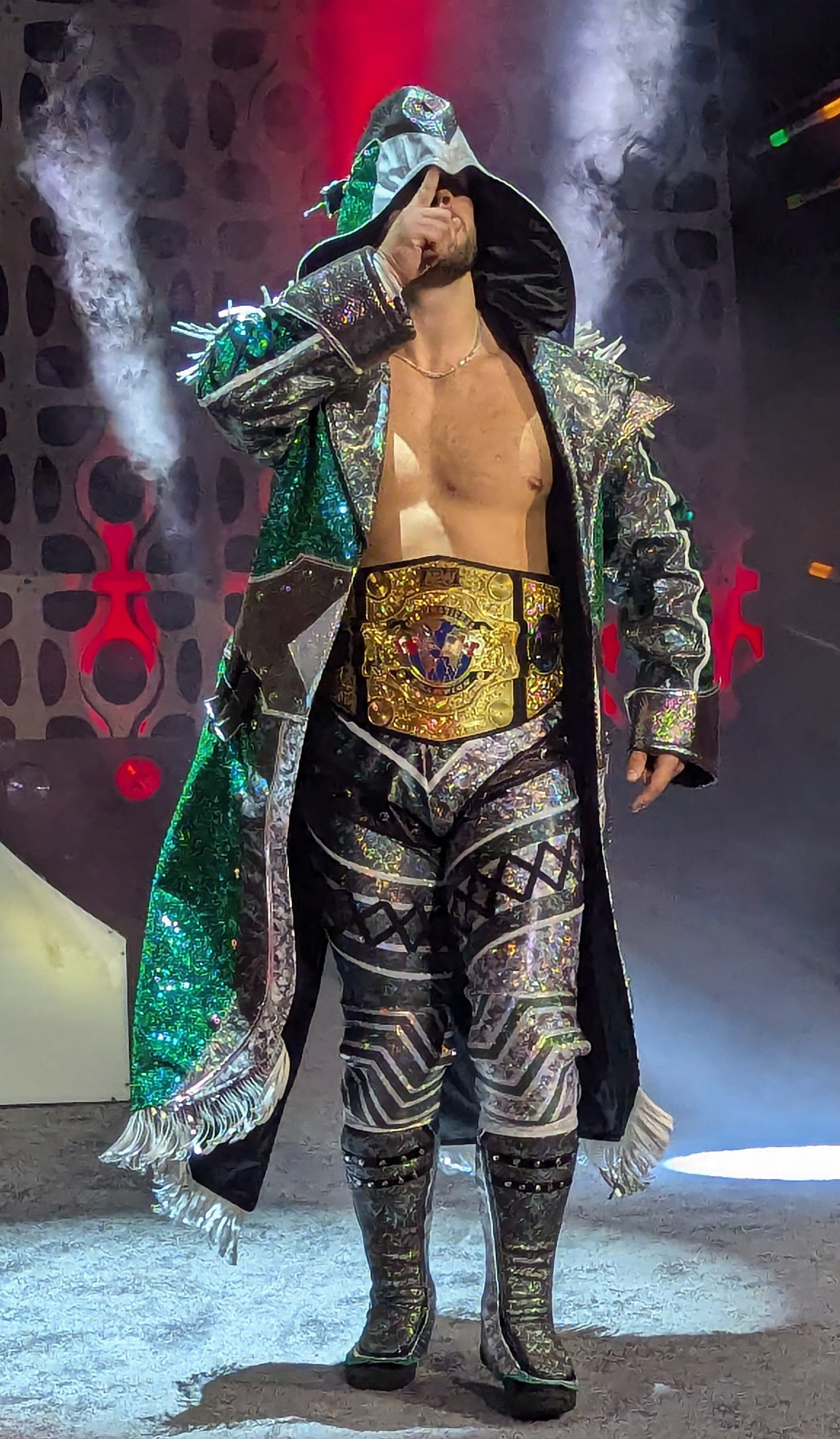
In AEW, Ospreay is a two-time AEW International Champion

- All Elite Wrestling
  - AEW World Championship (1 time, current)
  - AEW International Championship (2 times)
  - Owen Hart Cup (2026)
- ESPN
  - Match of the Year (2023) – vs. Kenny Omega (tie between their matches at Wrestle Kingdom 17 and Forbidden Door)
  - Match of the Year (2024) – vs. Bryan Danielson at AEW Dynasty
- Future Pro Wrestling
  - FPW Tag Team Championship (1 time) – with Paul Robinson
  - FPW Tag Team Championship Tournament (2014)
- Impact Wrestling
  - Impact Year End Awards
    - Match of the Year (2023) vs. Mike Bailey at Bound for Glory
- Inside The Ropes Magazine
  - Ranked No. 10 of the top 50 wrestlers in the world in the ITR 50 in 2020
- Lucha Britannia
  - Lucha Britannia World Championship (2 times)
- Melbourne City Wrestling
  - MCW Intercommonwealth Championship (1 time)
- New Japan Pro-Wrestling
  - IWGP Heavyweight Championship (1 time) (Note: During Ospreay's reign, the title was called the IWGP World Heavyweight Championship.)
  - IWGP United States Heavyweight Championship (2 times, final)
  - IWGP Intercontinental Championship (1 time) (Note: With the reactivation of the IWGP Heavyweight Championship and the restored and combined histories of both it, the World Heavyweight, and the Intercontinental titles, all former IWGP World Heavyweight Champions are retroactively recognized as having been an IWGP Intercontinental Champion.)
  - IWGP Junior Heavyweight Championship (3 times)
  - NEVER Openweight Championship (1 time)
  - NEVER Openweight 6-Man Tag Team Championship (1 time) – with Henare and Great-O-Khan
  - New Japan Cup (2021)
  - Fifth NJPW Triple Crown Champion
  - Third NJPW Grand Slam Champion
  - Best of the Super Juniors (2016, 2019)
- New York Post
  - Match of the Year (2023) – vs. Kenny Omega at Wrestle Kingdom 17
- One Pro Wrestling
  - 1PW World Heavyweight Championship (1 time)
- Preston City Wrestling
  - PCW 'One to Watch in 2015' End of Year Award (2014)
- Progress Wrestling
  - Progress Championship (1 time)
  - Progress Tag Team Championship (1 time) – with Paul Robinson
  - Super Strong Style 16 (2015)
  - Thunderbastard (2014)
- Pro Wrestling Australia
  - PWA Heavyweight Championship (1 time)
- Pro Wrestling Illustrated
  - Ranked No. 3 of the top 500 singles wrestlers in the PWI 500 in 2024
- Reloaded Championship Wrestling Alliance
  - RCWA Elite-1 Championship (1 time)
- Revolution Pro Wrestling
  - Undisputed British Heavyweight Championship (1 time)
  - British Cruiserweight Championship (2 times)
  - Undisputed British Tag Team Championship (1 time) – with Paul Robinson
  - Second Triple Crown Champion
- Ring of Honor
  - ROH World Television Championship (1 time)
  - Best Move of the Year (2017) – OsCutter
- SoCal Uncensored
  - Match of the Year (2016) – with Matt Sydal & Ricochet vs. Adam Cole & The Young Bucks on 3 September
- Southside Wrestling Entertainment
  - SWE Speed King Championship (2 times)
- Sports Illustrated
  - Best in the Ring (2025)
  - Ranked No. 6 of the top 10 men's wrestlers in 2018
  - Ranked No. 5 of the top 10 wrestlers in 2022 and 2023
- Tokyo Sports
  - Best Bout Award (2022) – vs. Kazuchika Okada on 18 August
- Warrior Wrestling
  - Warrior Wrestling Championship (1 time)
- What Culture Pro Wrestling/Defiant Wrestling
  - WCPW Tag Team Championship (1 time) – with Scotty Wainwright
  - Defiant Wrestling Award for Match of the Year (2017) – vs. Drew Galloway on 6 March
- Wrestling Observer Newsletter
  - Best Flying Wrestler (2016–2019, 2024)
  - Best Wrestling Maneuver (2019) – Storm Breaker
  - Best Wrestling Maneuver (2022–2024) – Hidden Blade
  - Europe MVP (2021–2023)
  - Japan MVP (2023)
  - Non-Heavyweight MVP (2018, 2019)
  - Most Outstanding Wrestler (2019, 2022–2024)
  - Pro Wrestling Match of the Year (2019) vs. Shingo Takagi on 5 June at the Best of the Super Juniors finals
  - Pro Wrestling Match of the Year (2022) vs. Kazuchika Okada on 18 August at the G1 Climax 32 finals
  - Pro Wrestling Match of the Year (2023) vs. Kenny Omega on 4 January at Wrestle Kingdom 17
  - Pro Wrestling Match of the Year (2024) vs. Bryan Danielson on 21 April at Dynasty
  - Wrestler of the Year (2023)
- Other titles
  - British Triangle Championship (1 time) – with Paul Robinson and Scott Wainwright
