= Dusty – The Dusty Springfield Musical =

Dusty
- The Dusty Springfield Musical
- Music: Various
- Lyrics: Various
- Book: Jonathan Harvey
- Basis: The life and music of Dusty Springfield
- Productions: 2018 UK tour

Dusty – The Dusty Springfield Musical is a jukebox musical by Jonathan Harvey based on the life and music of singer Dusty Springfield, featuring songs sung by Springfield.

== Production ==
The musical made its world premiere at the Theatre Royal, Bath from 23 June to 7 July 2018, before touring to Lyceum Theatre, Sheffield (10 to 14 July), Theatre Royal, Newcastle (17 to 21 July) and The Lowry, Salford (24 to 28 July). The production was directed by Maria Friedman and starring Katherine Kingsley in the title role.

== Cast and characters ==
Character	2018 cast
Dusty Springfield	Katherine Kingsley
Billings / Ray	Rufus Hound
Kay	Roberta Taylor
Ensemble / Alternate Dusty	Tricia Adele-Turner
Morgan	Adam Bailey
Kiki	Alex Bowen
Pat	Esther Coles
Lois	Joanna Francis
Wexler	Paul Grunert
Ruby	Ella Kenion

== See also ==
- Dusty – The Original Pop Diva, a 2006 Australian jukebox musical based on the life of Dusty Springfield
