= The Good Life (play) =

2021 play

- Original language: English
- Written by: Jeremy Sams (play); Bob Larbery and John Esmonde (TV series)
- Genre: Comedy

Premiere
- Date: 7 October 2021
- Place: Theatre Royal, Bath

The Good Life is a play by Jeremy Sams based on the BBC sitcom of the same name written by Bob Larbey and John Esmonde.

== Production ==
The play opened at the Theatre Royal, Bath on the 7th October 2021 before embarking on a UK tour that lasted until December. It was directed by Sams and starred Rufus Hound as Tom Good, Preeya Kalidas as Margo Leadbetter, Dominic Rowan as Jerry Leadbetter and Sally Tatum as Barbara Good.

== Cast ==
Character	UK Tour (2021)
Tom Good	Rufus Hound
Margo Leadbetter	Preeya Kalidas
Jerry Leadbetter	Dominic Rowan
Barbara Good	Sally Tatum
"Sir" aka Andrew Ferguson, Harry the Pigman, Policeman and Dr Joe	Nigel Betts
Felicity Ferguson, Milkwoman and Mary the Receptionist	Tessa Churchard
