= Jeremy Sams =

British theatre director, composer, & lyricist (born 1957)

- Born: 12 January 1957 (age 69) Croydon, London, England
- Occupation: Writer; director; composer; translator; orchestrator; lyricist
- Notable works: Chitty Chitty Bang Bang
- Children: 1

Jeremy Sams (born 12 January 1957) is a British theatre director, composer, and lyricist.

== Early life and education ==
Born and raised in Croydon, London, Sams is the son of the Shakespearean scholar and musicologist Eric Sams and his wife Enid (née Tidmarsh). He was educated at the independent Whitgift School.

Sams attended Magdalene College, Cambridge and initially read modern languages (French and German) before switching to music. After Cambridge, he went on to train as a pianist at the Guildhall School of Music and Drama.

== Career ==
At the start of his career, Sam worked as a freelance pianist and coach, giving frequent recitals and tours and doing stints as a repetiteur at opera houses in Brussels and Ankara. His first big break in theatre came about through working with Steven Pimlott in the early 1980s, when he was commissioned by Pimlott to write the music for his production of Ring Round the Moon at the Manchester Royal Exchange.

Sams directed a revival of Michael Frayn's farce Noises Off, which he mounted in London's Royal National Theatre in 2000. This production then transferred to the West End, and then to Brooks Atkinson Theatre on Broadway in 2001.

Among his other directing credits are the West End musicals Spend Spend Spend (1999), the story of Viv Nicholson, who squandered a fortune won in the British lottery, and a stage adaptation of the film Chitty Chitty Bang Bang (2002) for both of which he received Laurence Olivier Award nominations; the 2002 Broadway production Amour, which he translated from the original French libretto by Didier Van Cauwelaert. His efforts earned him two Tony Award and two Drama Desk Award nominations. His directing credits also include Jason Carr and Gary Yershon's musical of The Water Babies at the Chichester Festival Theatre in 2003. He directed the Jason Robert Brown Broadway musical13 at the Bernard B. Jacobs Theatre, on Broadway. He has also written and directed the stage adaptation of The Good Life based on the BBC TV sitcom which toured the UK in autumn 2021. He directed a stage adaptation of The Lavender Hill Mob based on the 1951 Ealing comedy film which began touring in autumn 2022.

Sams' many translations include plays by Botho Strauß; Mozart's The Marriage of Figaro, The Magic Flute, Puccini's La Boheme, and Wagner's The Ring Cycle for ENO; The Merry Widow for Covent Garden; Les Parents terribles, The Miser and Mary Stuart for the Royal National Theatre; The Threepenny Opera for the Donmar Warehouse; and What's in a Name? for the Birmingham Repertory Theatre.

Sams' composing credits include the 1995 BBC film adaptation of Jane Austen's Persuasion, for which he won the British Academy Television Craft Awards for Best Original Music. Other scores include The Mother (2003) and Enduring Love (2004).

Sams has written, arranged, and directed music for some 50 theatre productions, including The Wind in the Willows and Arcadia (Royal National Theatre) and The Merry Wives of Windsor (Royal Shakespeare Company).

== Honours ==
In 2013, Sams was awarded an honorary degree by Birmingham City University and was appointed as an Honorary Fellow of the Royal Academy of Music.

== Personal life ==
Sams has one child with his former partner, actress Maria Friedman.

== Works ==
=== Published play texts ===
Year	Title	Publisher	Note
1990	Macbeth	John Calder	Translation of the libretto from Giuseppe Verdi's Macbeth
1991	Don Juan on Trial	Dramatic Publishing	Translation of Eric-Emmanuel Schmitt's play
1994	Les Parents terribles	Nick Hern Books	Translation of Jean Cocteau's play
1995	Wild Oats	Nick Hern Books	Adaptation of John O'Keefe's play
1996	Mary Stuart	Nick Hern Books	Translation of Friedrich Schiller's play
1997	Anouilh Plays: 2	Methuen Drama	Includes Sams' translation of Jean Anouilh's The Rehearsal and Becket
2002	Antigone	Samuel French, Inc.	Translation of Anouilh's play
2005	Scapino	Nick Hern Books	Translation of Molière's play
2005	Botho Strauss: Three Plays	Oberon Books	Translation of The Park, Seven Doors, and The Room by Botho Strauss
2021	The Good Life	Nick Hern Books	Adapted from the TV series by John Esmonde and Bob Larbey

== Awards and nominations ==
Awards and nominations received by Jeremy Sams
Year	Awards Ceremony	Category	Nominated work(s)	Result	Note/Refs
1995	Laurence Olivier Awards	Best Revival of a Play or Comedy	Les Parents terribles	Nominated	Nominated as translator of the play
1995	Laurence Olivier Awards	Best Musical Revival	The Threepenny Opera	Nominated	Nominated as translator of the lyrics
1996	British Academy Television Awards	Best Original Music	Persuasion	Won	
2000	Laurence Olivier Awards	Best Director	Spend Spend Spend	Nominated	
2002	Outer Critics Circle Awards	Outstanding Direction of a Play	Noises Off	Nominated	
2003	Laurence Olivier Awards	Best New Musical	Chitty Chitty Bang Bang	Nominated	Joint nomination with Richard M. Sherman and Robert B. Sherman
2003	Tony Awards	Best Book of a Musical	Amour	Nominated	Joint nomination with Didier van Cauwelaert
2003	Tony Awards	Best Original Score (Music and/or Lyrics) Written for the Theatre	Amour	Nominated	Joint nomination with Michel Legrand and Didier van Cauwelaert
2003	Drama Desk Awards	Outstanding Book of a Musical	Amour	Nominated	Joint nomination with Didier van Cauwelaert
2003	Drama Desk Awards	Outstanding Lyrics	Amour	Nominated	Joint nomination with Didier van Cauwelaert
2005	Ivor Novello Awards	Best Original Film Score	Enduring Love	Won	
2007	Laurence Olivier Awards	Best Revival	Donkey's Years	Nominated	Director of the revival
