= Hoe Bridge School =

Independent school in Woking, Surrey, England

Location
- Hoe Place, Old Woking Road; Woking, Surrey, GU22 8JE; England; 51.3081°N 0.5368°W

Information
- Type: Independent Pre-prep & prep school
- Motto: Semper Optimum Meum
- Established: 1986
- Local authority: Surrey
- Department for Education URN: 125397 Tables
- Head teacher: Chris Webster
- Gender: Mixed
- Age: 3 to 16
- Enrolment: 548 (as of 2026)
- Website: www.hoebridgeschool.co.uk

Hoe Bridge School is an independent co-educational all-through school in Woking, England. At its last full inspection in 2023 it was rated excellent by the Independent Schools Inspectorate. The school was established in 1986 following the merger of two former proprietorial boys schools, Allen House and St Michael's School. In 1987 it became a charitable trust administered by a board of governors, and developed to include girls up to Year 6 in 1999. The school is based in a seventeenth century house and is set in its own grounds in Woking, Surrey.

== Site and facilities ==
Hoe Place is a former mansion which is home to the Hoe Bridge Prep department. It dates from 1680 and was a favourite retreat of Lady Castlemaine, a mistress of King Charles II.

The chapel, which houses teaching and music rooms, dates back to 1850 and has an original ice house in the gardens. The mansion remained a private residence until the 1920s, when Hoe Place Preparatory School was established in 1928 and in turn, became St. Michael's School in 1964.

Hoe Bridge School itself was formed in 1986 when St Michael's School merged with Allen House Preparatory School which had been founded at Box Grove near Guildford, then on part of the present Royal Grammar School site. In 2019 the school opened a new performing arts facility.

The school also features a new senior school (for children aged 13 to 16, years 9, 10 and 11) on the old Greenfield School site, the Hoe Bridge site was opened in September 2026. The new site retains the original Greenfield nursery for children aged 6 months to 16.

== Activities ==
The school sponsors a girls' field hockey team.

== Notable alumni ==
- Rufus Hound, comedian
