= Katherine Kingsley =

English actress

- Born: Cambridge, England
- Education: Bristol Old Vic Theatre School
- Years active: 2004–present
- Known for: Actress; voice actress; theatre actress
- Spouse: Dominic Tighe

Katherine Kingsley is an English actress.

== Early life ==
Born and raised in Cambridge and schooled at Parkside Community College and Long Road Sixth Form College, Kingsley moved to London to study with the English National Opera's The Knack, before studying acting at the Bristol Old Vic Theatre School.

== Career ==
Kingsley is a three-time Olivier Award Nominee. She has performed in iconic venues such as the Donmar Warehouse and the Menier Chocolate Factory, as well as the Chichester Theatre and many other West End venues. She has received critical praise for her turn as Marlene Dietrich in the Donmar production of Piaf, which led to an Olivier nomination in 2009. Furthermore, Katherine's portrayal of Lina Lamont in the 2012 Chichester Festival theatre production of Singin' In The Rain, led to a second nomination for an Olivier Theatre Award. Katherine has also been involved in The 39 Steps at the Criterion theatre.

Katherine played the character of Helena, opposite David Walliams and Sheridan Smith in the Michael Grandage Company's production of A Midsummer Night's Dream, the classic Shakespearean comedy. Directed by Michael Grandage himself, the production ran from 7 September to 16 November 2013 at London's Noël Coward Theatre.

On 1 November 2013, it was announced Katherine would play the role of Christine Colgate in the West End production of Dirty Rotten Scoundrels. This opened in March 2014. She has been nominated for a Whats On Stage Award and a Manchester Theatre Award for this.

In addition to her stage work, Katherine has also worked for BBC and ITV in various TV projects including, The Bill and Casualty, Bad Education, Uncle Series 2, and the Michael Grandage film, Genius, starring Jude Law, Colin Firth, Nicole Kidman and Laura Linney.

In 2016, she appeared in "Hated in the Nation", an episode of the anthology series Black Mirror. She also voiced the female announcer for the multiplayer of Battlefield 1.

In 2018, Kingsley played the title role in Dusty - The Dusty Springfield Musical by Jonathan Harvey based on the life of Dusty Springfield, touring the UK.

In 2021 Katherine took the part of Angela Snow in the latest reboot of "The Darling Buds of May" - "The Larkins" on ITV.

In 2022, Kingsley played the Acrobat's stepsister in Matilda the Musical.

Kingsley will be playing the Grand High Witch in the world premiere of the National Theatre's stage adaption of The Witches starting in November 2023.

== Personal life ==
She married actor Dominic Tighe and they have worked together on screen as well.

== Filmography ==
=== Television series ===
Year	Title	Role	Notes
2004	Hollyoaks	Caroline	2 episodes
2009	The Bill	FIO Linda Preston	Episode: Conviction: To the Limit
2014	Bad Education	Mrs. Grayson	Episode: The Exam
2015	Uncle	Claire	S2. Episode 4
2016	The Secret	Kyle Howell	2 episodes
2016	Black Mirror	Dana Costello	Episode: Hated in the Nation
2017	Endeavour	Mona Davies	Episode: Game
2017	Decline and Fall	Pamela Popham	S1. Episode: 2
2018	The Alienist	Mrs. Williams	Episode: These Bloody Thoughts
2018	No Offence	Anthonia Cairns	Episode: In His Head
2021–2022	The Larkins	Angela Snow	5 episodes
2024	Sister Boniface Mysteries	Bunny Frobisher	Episode: Once Upon a Time

=== Film ===
Year	Title	Role	Notes
2016	Genius	Purring Woman	
2019	Agatha and the Curse of Ishtar	Katharine Woolley	
2022	Matilda the Musical	The Acrobat's stepsister	

=== Video games ===
List of voice performances in video games
Year	Title	Role	Notes					
2016	Battlefield 1	Shooter	PC					
2017	Get Even	Rose / Additional voices	Xbox One					
2017	Forza Motorsport 7	The Storyteller	English version					
2018	Sea of Thieves	Grace Morrow / Annick / Wanda	Xbox Series X					
2018	Moonraker: The Radio Play	Gala Brand	PC					
2018	Vampyr	Elisabeth Ashbury / Camellia / Giselle Paxton / Hunter Katherine	PlayStation 4					
2018	We Happy Few	Victoria Byng	Xbox One					
2019	Battlefleet Gothic: Armada 2	Yvraine / Narrator	PC					
2019	Tom Clancy's Ghost Recon Breakpoint	Nomad Replicated Female	GeForce Now					
2019	We Happy Few: We All Fall Down	Victoria	PC					
2020	Kosmokrats	Olga	PC					
2020	Assassin's Creed Valhalla	Villagers / Hunters / Additional voices	PlayStation 5					
2021	Discovery Tour: Viking Age	Voice	PlayStation 4					
2021	Scarf	Voice	English version					
2022	Dying Light 2	Additional voices	PlayStation 5					
2022	Assassin's Creed Valhalla: Dawn of Ragnarök	Additional voices	PlayStation 5					
2023	Final Fantasy XVI	Additional voices	PlayStation 5					
2023	The Talos Principle 2	The Sphinx	PC					
2024	Flintlock: The Siege of Dawn	Inaya	PlayStation 5					
2024	Unknown 9: Awakening	Voice	Xbox One	-	2025	Battlefield 6	Additional voices	Playstation 5

== Awards and nominations ==
- 2009 - Oliver Award for Best Supporting Actress in a Musical for Piaf at The Donmar Warehouse and Vaudeville Theatre.
- 2012 - Olivier Award for Best Supporting Actress in a Musical for Lina Lamont in Singin' In The Rain at The Palace Theatre.
- 2012 - Whats On Stage Award for Best Supporting Actress in a Musical for Lina Lamont in Singin' In The Rain at The Palace Theatre.
- 2014 - Olivier Award for Best Supporting Actress in a Play for Helena in a Midsummer Night's Dream at The Noël Coward Theatre.
- 2015 - Whats On Stage Award for Best Supporting Actress in a Musical for Christine Colgate in Dirty Rotten Scoundrels at The Savoy Theatre.
- 2015 - Manchester Theatre Award for Best Actress in a Visiting Production.
