= Rufus Hound =

British actor, comedian and presenter (born 1979)

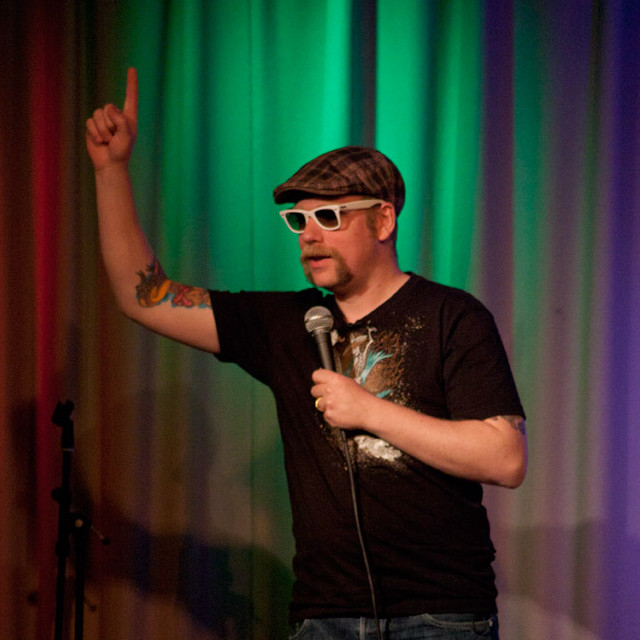
- Hound in 2011
- Born: Robert James Blair Simpson; 6 March 1979 (age 47); Essex, England
- Occupations: Actor; comedian; presenter
- Spouse: Beth Johnson (m. 2007; div. 2020)
- Children: 2

Rufus Hound (born Robert James Blair Simpson; 6 March 1979) is an English actor, comedian and presenter.

== Early life ==
Hound was born on 6 March 1979 in Essex and moved to Surrey at the age of 7. His father was an accountant and his mother a civil servant; Hound, one of twin sons, described his upbringing as 'intensely middle-class'. He was educated at Hoe Bridge School Woking, Frensham Heights and Godalming College, where he was elected as a Student Representative and built the college radio station. After leaving school he began working for a PR agency but started performing comedy in the evenings. In 2000, he left his job as an account executive for Claire's Accessories to begin working full-time as a stand-up comedian. While working at the Edinburgh Festival he adopted the stage name 'Rufus Hound' for the first time.

== Career ==
=== Television and radio ===
Hound hosted Destination Three, the coverage of the Glastonbury Festival and Top of the Pops in 2005 and 2006 alongside Fearne Cotton. He presented the idiosyncratic reality show Grime Scene Investigation on BBC Three with staff and students from Aston University, and narrated BBC Two's broadcasts of MythBusters. He has also appeared in many comedy shows and quizzes such as Street Cred Sudoku and Nevermind the Buzzcocks, as well as Celebrity Juice where he was a regular panellist. He narrated the 2009 series Rocket Science and has appeared on The Apprentice: You're Fired! and Richard & Judy. He also presented Outtake TV on BBC1, replacing Anne Robinson.

In early 2008, Hound appeared twice on ITV's Thank God You're Here in the UK, after initially working as the warm-up act. In late summer 2008, Hound joined the panel show Argumental as the Blue Team Captain. Hound was the narrator for the gaming series Playr and presents What Do Kids Know? on UKTV-owned channel Watch. Hound took part in Let's Dance for Sport Relief, dancing to Cheryl Cole's "Fight for This Love" and won the final of the series on 13 March 2010. Partnered with Flavia Cacace, Hound won the 2013 Strictly Come Dancing Christmas special.

Hound hosted the year 2000 edition of My Funniest Year, a look at a past year of British television, which was broadcast on Channel 4 in September 2010. He has been a regular panelist on Celebrity Juice, hosted by Keith Lemon, and has appeared at Bright Club a number of times. In January 2011, Hound participated in the former Channel 4 reality series Famous and Fearless. He came third for the boys' team, and was referred to as "The Ruthless Hound". In 2012, Hound was a team captain for Mad Mad World.

Since 2012, he has presented a programme on BBC Radio Four called My Teenage Diary, in which celebrities talk about the diary that they kept in their teenage years. On 22 February 2016, Hound made his debut as a panellist on BBC Radio 4's Just A Minute alongside regular Paul Merton and semi-regulars Pam Ayres and Graham Norton.

Hound plays a fictionalised version of himself in the CBBC television series Hounded as the protagonist, a normal television presenter who must constantly foil the plans of Dr Muhahaha, who plans on taking over the world. In 2015, Hound played Sam Swift in an episode of the ninth series of Doctor Who, titled "The Woman Who Lived", and appeared in the Channel 4 drama series Cucumber as an eccentric character called Rupert.

Hound contributed his vocals to the track "Tazer Beam" by The Skints from their album FM, released in March 2015.

In 2016, Hound played the part of Duncan in the sixth series of the Sky 1 sitcom Trollied.

SInce 2017, Hound has made regular appearances in Big Finish audio dramas, playing a regeneration of The Meddling Monk.

In November 2017, Hound temporarily took over hosting responsibilities of Iain Lee's Talkradio show, named The Late Night Alternative as Iain Lee joined the cast of the 2017 series of I'm a Celebrity...Get Me Out of Here!. from 2018 to 2020 he has provided the voice of Waffle on the CBeebies and BBC One show Waffle the Wonder Dog.

In 2021, Hound participated in the thirteenth series of Dancing on Ice opposite professional partner Robin Johnstone. They were forced to withdraw from the competition in week 4 after Hound tested positive for COVID-19. From October to November 2021, Hound appeared in four episodes of the BBC soap opera Doctors as Keith "Starbuck" Dursley.

=== Film ===
Hound made his acting debut in the Direct-to-DVD film Big Fat Gypsy Gangster which was directed by Ricky Grover. He also stars in the 2012 film The Wedding Video.

=== Theatre ===
From October 2012 through February 2013, Hound played the lead role of Francis Henshall in the National Theatre production of One Man, Two Guvnors on a UK tour. Following the end of the tour, he took over the role in the West End production at the Theatre Royal Haymarket from 4 February 2013. In summer 2013 he played Roy in Chichester Festival Theatre's revival of Neville's Island by Tim Firth at the Theatre in the Park (a temporary theatre, while the Festival theatre was being refurbished).

In 2014, Hound played the role of Freddie in the West End production of Dirty Rotten Scoundrels at the Savoy Theatre after out-of-town tryouts in Manchester and Aylesbury.

In early 2016 he played the role of Sancho Panza in the Royal Shakespeare Company's production of Don Quixote, adapted by James Fenton. The production transferred to the Garrick Theatre in London's West End for a limited season from October 2018 to February 2019.

On 23 April 2016, Hound appeared in Shakespeare Live! From The RSC at the Royal Shakespeare Theatre in Stratford-upon-Avon (which was also broadcast live on BBC Two) celebrating the birthday and 400 years since the death of William Shakespeare. He appeared as the Second Gangster opposite Henry Goodman performing 'Brush Up Your Shakespeare' from the musical Kiss Me, Kate.

In late 2016, he played Toad in the world premiere of the new musical, The Wind in the Willows in Plymouth, Salford and Southampton. In June 2017 he reprised the role for a West End transfer at the London Palladium, after playing Dr Prentice in a revival of What The Butler Saw by Joe Orton at the Curve Theatre, Leicester and Theatre Royal Bath in March 2017.

In April 2018, he returned to Chichester Festival Theatre to play Garry Essendine in a revival of Present Laughter by Noël Coward. From June 2018 he played Vic Billings / Ray in Dusty - The Dusty Springfield Musical on a UK tour.

He has played the role of Constant in the Royal Shakespeare Company's production of The Provoked Wife by John Vanbrugh and returned to the RSC for winter 2019 to play Dennis's Dad in the new musical The Boy in the Dress, based on the book by David Walliams.

In March 2020, he was due to play the role of Hugo/Loco Chanelle in the West End production of Everybody's Talking About Jamie, prior to the suspension of performances due to COVID-19. During November and December 2020 he portrayed Buttons in the adult pantomime Cinderella: A Socially Distanced Ball at the Turbine Theatre (at the Battersea Power Station), written by Jodie Prenger and Neil Hurst.

In 2021, he played Tom Good in the UK tour of The Good Life based on the BBC sitcom. He appeared as Abanazar in Aladdin at the New Theatre Peterborough during Christmas of 2021.

In late 2023, Hound played Pseudolus in Stephen Sondheim's A Funny Thing Happened on the Way to the Forum at Billetterie Lido 2 in Paris.

In late 2024, Hound played Jacob Marley in Mark Gatiss' adaptation of A Christmas Carol: A Ghost Story by Charles Dickens at the Birmingham Repertory Theatre.

Year	Title	Role	Venue
2012	Utopia	Performer	Soho Theatre
2012–13	One Man, Two Guvnors	Francis Henshall	UK tour
2013	One Man, Two Guvnors	Francis Henshall	Theatre Royal Haymarket
2013	Neville's Island	Roy	Theatre in the Park, Chichester
2014	Dirty Rotten Scoundrels	Freddy Benson	Manchester Opera House
2014	Dirty Rotten Scoundrels	Freddy Benson	Aylesbury Waterside Theatre
2014	Dirty Rotten Scoundrels	Freddy Benson	Savoy Theatre
2015	The War of the Roses	Bedford/Bolingbroke/Jack Cade/Rivers	Rose Theatre, Kingston
2016	Don Quixote	Sancho Panza	Swan Theatre, Stratford-upon-Avon
2016	Shakespeare Live! From the RSC	Second Gangster	Royal Shakespeare Theatre, Stratford-upon-Avon
2016	The Wind in the Willows	Toad	Theatre Royal, Plymouth
2016	The Wind in the Willows	Toad	The Lowry, Salford
2016	The Wind in the Willows	Toad	Mayflower Theatre, Southampton
2017	What the Butler Saw	Dr Prentice	Curve, Leicester
2017	What the Butler Saw	Dr Prentice	Theatre Royal, Bath
2017	The Wind in the Willows	Toad	London Palladium
2018	Present Laughter	Garry Essendine	Chichester Festival Theatre
2018	Dusty - The Dusty Springfield Musical	Billings / Ray	UK tour
2018–19	Don Quixote	Sancho Panza	Garrick Theatre
2019	The Provoked Wife	Constant	Swan Theatre, Stratford-upon-Avon
2019–20	The Boy in the Dress	Dennis' Dad	Royal Shakespeare Theatre, Stratford-upon-Avon
2020	Cinderella: A Socially Distanced Ball	Buttons	Turbine Theatre
2021	The Good Life	Tom Good	UK tour
2021	Aladdin	Abanazar	New Theatre Peterborough
2022	Jack and the Beanstalk	King Nigel of Norwich	Theatre Royal, Norwich
2023	It's Headed Straight Towards Us	Gary	Park Theatre, London
2023	A Funny Thing Happened on the Way to the Forum	Pseudolus	Billetterie Lido 2 Paris
2024	A Christmas Carol: A Ghost Story	Jacob Marley	Birmingham Repertory Theatre

== Personal life ==
Hound lives in Hampton, London.

In April 2007, Hound was married at the Little White Wedding Chapel in Las Vegas Strip, Nevada, to Beth Johnson, whom he had met at the Reading Festival the year before. They have two children together Alby & Hilda. They separated as of April 2020. Rufus has since been linked romantically with actress Sally Hodgkiss.

=== Politics ===
Hound campaigned for the Liberal Democrats at the 2010 general election. He has subsequently declared his support for the Labour Party. In an episode of The Jonathan Ross Show, which aired on 25 January 2014, Hound announced plans to run as a Member of the European Parliament for the party in the London constituency in the 2014 European Parliament election. Hound was the fifth candidate on the National Health Action Party list, which came ninth, receiving 23,253 votes (1.06 per cent of the vote).

Hound has made critical statements against Conservative Party figures David Cameron and Jeremy Hunt.

In August 2015, Hound endorsed Jeremy Corbyn's campaign in the Labour Party leadership election. He tweeted: "Understand your thinking, but Corbyn=alternative. The others =Tory policies inflicted with mea culpa eyes". In July 2016, he also supported Corbyn after mass resignations from his cabinet and a leadership challenge. He performed stand-up at "Keep Corbyn event" in Kentish Town

=== Manchester Arena bombing conspiracy theory ===
In May 2017, Hound wrote a series of tweets concerning the Manchester Arena bombing, in which he implied the attack was a false flag operation designed to help the Conservative Party in the upcoming general election, likening it to the German Reichstag fire of 1933. The comments were widely condemned: he was compared to 9/11 truther conspiracy theorists and accused of insensitivity to the victims of the attack; he later issued an apology via social media.

== Stand-up DVDs ==
- Being Rude! (7 November 2011)

Preceded by Robert Webb	Winner of Let's Dance for Sport Relief; 2010	Succeeded by Charlie Baker and James Thornton
