= Greg Burridge =

British professional wrestler

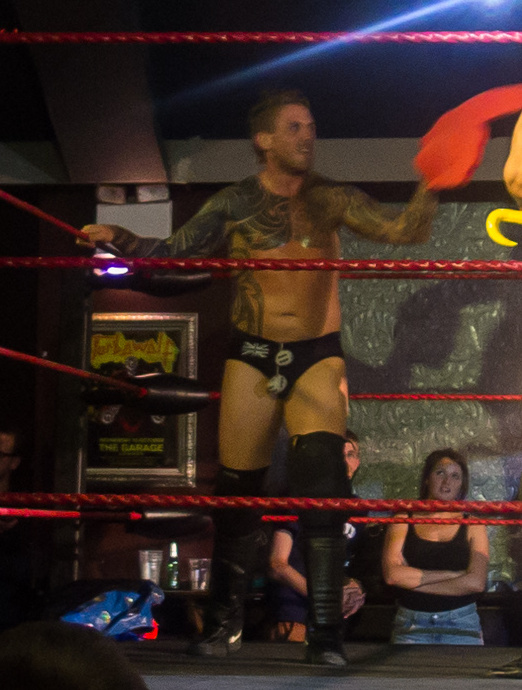
- Greg Burridge at Progress Wrestling Chapter 3 in September 2012

Personal information
- Born: 12 September 1981 (age 44) Romford, Essex, England
- Website: gregburridge.net/bio/ burridgefightdesign.com

Professional wrestling career
- Ring name(s): Greg Burridge; Darren Burridge
- Billed height: 6 ft 1 in (185 cm)
- Billed weight: 209 lb (95 kg)

Greg Burridge (born 12 September 1981) is an English professional wrestler, actor and stuntman, currently working with the London school of Lucha Libre, and co-owner of Lucha Britannia. Burridge started his career as a professional wrestler in 2002, best known for his time with 1 Pro Wrestling and Preston City Wrestling.

Burridge started acting and performing stunts in 2008, working on films including Harry Potter and the Deathly Hallows – Part 2 and Dracula Untold. Burridge has also worked as a stunt director. In 2018, Burridge wrote and created his own feature-length movie, London Rampage.

== Championships and accomplishments ==
- 1 Pro Wrestling
  - 1PW Openweight Championship (1 time)
  - 1PW Tag Team Championship (1 time) – with Colt Cabana
- Future Pro Wrestling
  - FPW Championship (1 time)
- Lucha Britannia
  - Lucha Britannia World Championship (2 times)
- Nordic Championship Wrestling
  - NCW World Heavyweight Championship (1 time)
- Southside Wrestling Entertainment
  - SWE Heavyweight Championship (1 time)
- WrestleForce
  - WrestleForce World Championship (2 times)
