= ECCW Pacific Cup =

ECCW Pacific Cup is an annual professional wrestling tournament held by the Canadian promotion Elite Canadian Championship Wrestling (ECCW). The first edition of the tournament took place on November 24, 2000 in New Westminster, with Asian Cougar defeating Havoc and Tony Kozina in the final. After a hiatus in 2001, the event was moved closer to the start of the year in 2002, and the location alternated between Surrey and Vancouver in later years. After years of doing the singles version of the ECCW Pacific Cup, ECCW held a tag team version in 2004.

== Format ==
Wrestlers compete in a variety of "qualifying" matches, usually either singles matches or tag team matches, with the winner(s) of each match advancing to an elimination match where the last remaining competitor would be deemed the Survival of the Fittest winner.

== List of winners ==
Winners
Year	Name
2000	Asian Cougar
2002	Black Dragon
2003	Scotty Mac
2004	Major Hardway
2005	Aaron Idol
2006	Memphis Raines
2007	Kyle O'Reilly
2008	Billy Suede
2009	El Phantasmo
2010	Artemis Spencer
2011	RICK
2012	Bishop
2013	"The Loose Cannon" Kenny Lush
2014	Bishop
2015	Alex Plexis
2016	Ethan H. D.
2017	Nicole Matthews

== History ==
=== 2004 Tag Tournament ===
The 2004 Pacific Cup Tag Tournament was held over two days: May 7 in Vancouver and May 8 in New Westminster, British Columbia. It was a 12-team single-elimination tournament. After the first round, Madison came to the ring and drew the names of two teams (Models Inc. and The Heatseekers), and those two teams battled in a wildcard match. The winner of the wildcard match was given a bye to the semi-finals of the tournament.

Participants:

- Insert Cool Name Here (Adam Firestorm & Tony Kozina)
- Models Inc. (MR2 & Memphis Raines)
- Oriental Tigers (Asian Cooger & Ueno Yukihide)
- The Heatseekers (Aaron Idol & Sweet Daddy Devastation)
- Double Platinum (Vance Nevada & Disco Fury)
- The Emergency Response Team (Vid Vain & R.A.G.E.)
- Explicit Content (Major Hardway & Dropkick Murphy)
- The Dark Horses (Cole Bishop & Dave Richards)
- The Ballard Brothers (Shane & Shannon Ballard)
- Club International (Skag Rollins & Seth Knight)
- Team MatRats (Scotty Mac & Jack Evans)
- Team All Star (Machette Singh & Fade)

=== 2005 ===
On day two of the 2005 Pacific Cup tournament, on April 23, 2005, Aaron Idol beat Puma and Bryan Danielson in a triple threat match in the finals of the Pacific Cup tournament that lasted 30 minutes. After the match, Danielson smashed the Pacific Cup trophy and claimed that ECCW was inferior to New Japan Pro-Wrestling. Puma and Danielson then beat down Idol. Promoter Dave Republic then issued a challenge to New Japan, and gave Antonio Inoki 30 days to respond. Inoki did not respond and the challenge was then dropped as a result.

=== 2006 ===
The 2006 edition of the tournament was also held to fill the vacant NWA Canadian Junior Heavyweight Championship, which Idol had given up in March that year to challenge for the NWA/ECCW Heavyweight title. Memphis Raines defeated Kyle O'Reilly in the championship final on June 23, 2006 in Surrey to win both the Pacific Cup and the NWA Canadian Junior title.

=== 2007 ===
The 2007 Pacific Cup took place in Vancouver, BC, on June 16, 2007. Among the competitors who took part were Ring of Honor star Davey Richards, former NWA World Junior Heavyweight Champion "Tornado" Tony Kozina, 2006 Pacific Cup winner Memphis Raines, NWA Canadian Junior Heavyweight Champion Ice, and Kyle O'Reilly. O'Reilly beat Kozina and Scotty Mac in a three-way tournament final to win the Pacific Cup. The event also featured a first-round match in the tournament to crown a new NWA World Heavyweight Champion, as former ROH World Champion "American Dragon" Bryan Danielson defeated top NWA contender "Bomber" Nelson Creed by submission.

=== 2008 ===
The 2008 Pacific Cup tournament took place in Vancouver, BC on June 7, 2008. Billy Suede emerged victorious in front of a packed house in Vancouver by defeating both El Phantasmo and defending Pacific Cup champion Kyle O'Reilly in the finals. O'Reilly defeated Halo and Azeem The Dream to make it to the final. Phantasmo defeated Ravenous Randy in round one, and defeated 2002 Pacific Cup champion Black Dragon in the semifinals by submission. Suede defeated fellow Storm Wrestling Academy graduate CJ Strongheart in the first round, and defeated "Dastardly" Danni Deeds in the semifinals. Deeds was the replacement for Ice, who suffered a concussion in his first round victory over Jamie Diaz and was ruled unable to continue by ECCW officials. In a feature match made at the start of the show by ECCW owner Dave Republic, Scotty Mac successfully defended the NWA Canadian Heavyweight championship in a falls count anywhere match versus both The Cremator and Synn. Mac was sent over the upper balcony by The Cremator, but landed on both Synn and his own Chilltown stablemates (Sid Sylum, Azeem the Dream, and The Natural) and pinned Synn to retain his title.

=== 2009 ===
The 2009 Pacific Cup tournament took place in Vancouver, British Columbia, on June 6, 2009. El Phantasmo emerged victorious, by defeating Rick "The Weapon" X and Azeem The Dream. Rick "The Weapon" X was a replacement for Manther, who was injured.

=== 2010 ===
On June 6, 2010 Artemis Spencer defeated 2007 winner Kyle O'Reilly in the finals to win the Pacific Cup. All the opponents he defeated on his path were former Pacific Cup Champions. Spencer defeated 2006 winner Memphis Raines in the first round, reigning 2009 Champion El Phantasmo in the semi-finals and finally O'Reilly in the finals. At the end of the final match when El Phantasmo came to the ring to present the trophy to Spencer, Spencer delivered a low blow to Phantasmo setting up a rematch at the next event.

=== 2011 ===
The 2011 Pacific Cup tournament took place on June 18, 2011 in Vancouver and saw controversy, as El Phantasmo was attacked by a masked man following his semi-final victory over Billy Suede and was eliminated from the tournament. RICK was inserted as the assigned alternate into the tournament, and won the final bout over 2010 champion Artemis Spencer to win the Pacific Cup tournament by only winning one match.

=== 2012 ===
The 2012 Pacific Cup tournament took place on February 24, 2012 in Surrey and February 25th, 2012 in Vancouver, and reverted to a two-night, 16-man tournament format, with no weight restrictions. Artemis Spencer was forced by ECCW owner Michael Sweetser to put the NWA Canadian Heavyweight Championship on the line during each of his tournament matches. Spencer made it to the finals, losing both the Pacific Cup final and the championship to Bishop.

=== 2013 ===
The 2013 Pacific Cup tournament took place March 9, 2013 in Vancouver. Davey Richards and ECCW original Tony Kozina returned home to take part in the 8-man tournament. Tag team partners The Stallions, Tony Baroni and Artemis Spencer, met in the first round with Tony Baroni getting the advantage. He faced El Phantasmo in the second round, who beat Andy "The Dreadful" Bird in the opening match of the night. El Phantasmo pulled out the victory over Baroni, sending him to the finals. Kenny Lush defeated former ROH World Champion Davey Richards and Bishop defeated "Tornado" Tony Kozina in their respective first round matches. In a battle of the behemoths in ECCW, Kenny Lush edged out Bishop after a top-rope Death Valley Driver, punching his ticket into the finals where he defeated El Phantasmo to capture his first Pacific Cup.

=== 2014 ===
The 2014 Pacific Cup tournament, billed as "Tournament of Champions", took place March 15, 2014 in Vancouver. The 8-man tournament consisted of the last 8 years of winners, meaning that a two-time Pacific Cup winner was inevitable. In the opening contest, RICK blasted Artemis Spencer with a chair when he came out of the curtain but was ultimately unable to usurp Spencer from the tournament. Bishop defeated Memphis and Billy Suede edged out El Phantasmo to advance into the second round. In the semi-finals, fan-favourite Artemis Spencer was again unable to eliminate Bishop in a rematch from the 2012 Finals, and two-time ROH tag-team champion Kyle O'Reilly was upset by Billy Suede who overcame a huge obstacle in O'Reilly, but could not manage that same luck with Bishop, who Bishop-Bombed his way into history as the only competitor to win the Pacific Cup twice.

== See also ==
- Professional wrestling in Canada
