= Rockford 2001 =

Canadian wrestler (born 1968)

Rockford
Personal information
- Born: Todd Fenwick; 24 September 1968 (age 58) Esterhazy, Saskatchewan, Canada

Professional wrestling career
- Ring name(s): Riptide Rockford; Rockford; Rockford 2000; Rockford 2001
- Billed height: 6 ft 0 in (183 cm)
- Billed weight: 214 lb (97 kg)
- Trained by: Michelle Starr; Tim Flowers
- Debut: 1993
- Retired: 2013

Todd Fenwick (born 1968 in Esterhazy, Saskatchewan, Canada) is a Canadian retired professional wrestler and actor better known by his ring name Rockford.

Fenwick is a veteran of the Independent circuit, a former NWA World Junior Heavyweight Champion, and a member of the SLAM! Wrestling Canadian Hall of Fame. As an actor, he has appeared on the television show Dark Angel.

== Professional wrestling career ==
Fenwick is a veteran of the US west coast wrestling scene. He was introduced to the wrestling business by his wife, who had planned on becoming a professional wrestler prior to a car accident. After attending a show together, Fenwick decided to enter the business himself. "I figured I could do it. Ten years later, here I am," Fenwick stated. His wife also acts as his valet under the name "Freedom".

Prior to entering pro wrestling, Fenwick had played football for 14 years in British Columbia Canadian Junior Football League where he was a Canadian junior all-star four years consecutively. He is also an alumnus of the University of Washington, where he also played football. He was trained in professional wrestling by Michelle Starr and Tim Flowers, and credits his football tenure in preparing him for the tempestuous nature of the training. He stated that "I was used to the BS Marine stuff from football. Intimidation doesn't cut it with me". He has said that he was taught very little from Starr and Flowers and credits his long road journeys with veteran wrestlers Bad News Allen and Jimmy Snuka for teaching him most of what he learned about the business.

Since his debut, Fenwick has wrestled primarily throughout the Pacific Northwest, competing for promotions such as Elite Canadian Championship Wrestling, All-Star Wrestling, ICW and CWF. He has also performed for World Championship Wrestling before its folding. He has had memorable rivalries with wrestlers such as Tony Kozina, whom he credits as being the best worker in wrestling. "I feel that God short-changed Tony by not giving him size. If he was bigger, he'd be a millionaire" Fenwick stated of Kozina. Throughout his career, Fenwick has focused on the character-driven aspect of wrestling, stating that "our job is to go out and entertain the fans, that's what they pay for when they buy their tickets". Outside of wrestling, Fenwick runs his own business selling pipes and is the Head Coach of the White Rock Titans Football minors.

== Championships and accomplishments ==
- National Wrestling Alliance
  - NWA World Junior Heavyweight Championship
- Elite Canadian Championship Wrestling
  - ECCW Vancouver Island Heavyweight Championship
- International Championship Wrestling (Canada)
  - ICW Tag Team Championship
