= Adam Firestorm =

New Zealand professional wrestler (1976–2009)

Personal information
- Born: Adam Travis Dykes; November 25, 1976 Auckland, Auckland, New Zealand
- Died: November 5, 2009 (aged 32)
- Cause of death: Suicide
- Website: AdamFirestorm.com

Professional wrestling career
- Ring name(s): Adam Firestorm; El Antorcha; Torch
- Billed height: 5 ft 10 in (1.78 m)
- Billed weight: 175 lb (79 kg)
- Trained by: Michelle Starr; Velvet McIntyre
- Debut: March 12, 1996 vs. Skull Manson

Adam Travis Dykes (November 25, 1976 – November 5, 2009) was a New Zealand–Canadian professional wrestler, known by his ring name Adam Firestorm, who competed in North American independent promotions in the Pacific Northwest and Western Canada during the late 1990s and early 2000s, most notably as a mainstay of Extreme Canadian Championship Wrestling. Several of his most memorable matches include top Canadian independent wrestlers such as "Rocket" Randy Tyler, Dr. Luther, Chance Beckett, "Tornado" Tony Kozina, "Fallen Angel" Christopher Daniels, Bryan Danielson, Bryan Alvarez, Asian Cougar and Juggernaut.

In addition to ECCW, he competed for Portland Wrestling, Can Am Wrestling Federation, Stampede Wrestling, Prairie Wrestling Alliance, Pacific Northwest Championship Wrestling, Canadian All Pro Wrestling, W.H.I.P. Wrestling, Bad Boys of Wrestling, and the Continental Association of Wrestling.

== Career ==
=== Early career (1995–1996) ===
Firestorm first became involved in wrestling as a writer for the magazine Northwest Wrestler, which covered wrestling in Oregon, Washington State, and British Columbia. He later went on to become editor of the publication. Some time later, Firestorm and fellow Northwest Wrestler staff member James Olson were hired by West Coast Championship Wrestling to take over publishing their official event program. In addition, Firestorm worked as timekeeper, ring announcer, ring crew, and videographer at different periods. He released two videotape during this time, WCCW Mat Mayhem, and Ring Wars.

Trained for the ring primarily by WCCW (and later ECCW) wrestler/promoter "Gorgeous" Michelle Starr, he also trained for three months with former WWE Women's Champion Velvet McIntyre.

When a wrestler failed to appear for an ECCW (Extreme Canadian Championship Wrestling) tour of Vancouver Island in March 1996, Firestorm was called into action under the masked guise of El Antorcha. He won his debut match (a steel cage match) against Skull Manson in Port Alberni, British Columbia.

=== Extreme Canadian Championship Wrestling (1996–2002) ===
With about a year of experience, El Antorcha won a Doomsday Battle Royal to claim the vacant ECCW Heavyweight Title. Firestorm suffered several injuries in the bout (a battle royal with weapons), which was a major factor in his loss of the title in April 1997.

Firestorm assisted Michelle Starr with training several wrestlers in 1997 after the opening of the ECCW Pro Wrestling School. He teamed with one of the first graduates, Strife, to form Generation X. They challenged for the ECCW tag team titles on several occasions.

During 1998, Firestorm traded the ECCW Junior Heavyweight title back and forth several times with "Tornado" Tony Kozina. He also held the NWA Pacific Northwest Junior Heavyweight title several times after ECCW joined the National Wrestling Alliance.

In 1999, he unified the two junior titles, winning a one-night tournament. In the finals, he defeated Disco Fury and Chance Beckett in a Triple Threat Ladder Match. After losing the title, he went on to capture the prestigious NWA Canadian Junior Heavyweight title twice, defeating The Black Dragon both times.

In 2000, El Antorcha's feud with Chance Beckett came to a head, with heel ECCW Commissioner and NWA representative Dave Republic siding with Beckett. Republic would continuously allow outside interference on the behalf of Beckett until Torch lost the Pacific Northwest Junior Heavyweight Title to Beckett. When the behaviour continued during rematches, Republic forced the mask to be put up in order to grant another rematch. Firestorm again lost due to outside interference and was forced to unmask. Later that same evening, Beckett returned to the ring to gloat over winning the match, keeping his title and taking the mask. Firestorm stormed the ring and beat down Beckett until he agreed to one more rematch. A furious Dave Republic ordered the rematch would be a ladder match. Firestorm, wrestling for the first time unmasked as Adam Firestorm, defeated Beckett in the ladder match to regain his championship. Republic forced Firestorm to face his first challenger, Disco Fury, just moments after the ladder match ended. Disco capitalized on a weakened Firestorm to handily win the belt.

=== Alliance with Ladies Choice (2003–2005) ===
Firestorm briefly competed as a heel during 2003. Turning on tag team partners Scotty Mac and Ja Jakobe, Firestorm aligned himself with Aaron Idol, Sweet Daddy, and Chance Beckett. A full-time team with Beckett never materialized, so Firestorm formed a team with the hated Ladies Choice, feuding with Scotty Mac and various partners.

During the Summer of 2003, Firestorm and Ladies Choice faced Scotty Mac and MTV Canada host Brian Adler in a nationally televised bout on the program MTV Select.

Firestorm's run as a heel came to an end following a loss against Rocky Della Serra in New Westminster, British Columbia, in December 2003. Firestorm announced he would be leaving ECCW and the Northwest, and thanked the fans. Partner Ladies Choice took issue with this and attacked Firestorm before Della Serra returned to help Firestorm fight him off.

While wrestling on a Stampede Wrestling event in Cochrane, Alberta, in May 2005, Firestorm suffered a serious elbow injury. The injury came during a dive outside the ring against "Livewire" Matt Richards. While originally diagnosed by emergency department doctors at Foothills Hospital in Calgary as a case of tendinitis, X-rays would show a crack in the elbow 85% through the bone. Firestorm was told to rest the arm and it would heal within eight weeks. One year later, after swelling from the elbow caused tendon and ligaments in the arm to atrophy (causing a loss in range of motion), X-rays at the time revealed the crack was still present. Surgery options were few, with the best offering a 2% R.O.M. improvement, while carrying a risk of a loss of an additional 15%. Firestorm chose not to have the procedure.

=== 2007–2009 ===
Firestorm's wrestling appearances (all non-physical) were few after his injury. In September 2007, El Antorcha made a surprise return, appearing in the corner of El Phantasmo at an All Star Wrestling event in Comox, British Columbia. El Antorcha also appeared on a December 2007 wrestling event in Victoria, British Columbia.

He instead focused on video production (he attended film school at the Southern Alberta Institute of Technology in Calgary, Alberta), and assisting various promoters and wrestlers with promotional materials and websites. Firestorm lived in Victoria, British Columbia, with his wife and son, where he operated his own video production company, Firestorm Video Production. He also co-hosted the Ringside Live internet radio show with Ian Hamilton every Friday night.

In September 2009 Dykes was severely injured when a van he was a passenger in collided with a 600 lb elk on Vancouver Island. As he later wrote in his blog, "[We] are all very lucky. And I can joke that I took an elk's butt to the face and lived to talk about [it]... even perhaps comment on any recent meals he had eaten. When you look at what was left of the van, you can see how very close I came to being killed."

Dykes died on November 5, 2009, from an apparent suicide due to his suffering from depression.

== Championships and accomplishments ==
- NWA: Extreme Canadian Championship Wrestling
  - NWA Canadian Junior Heavyweight Championship (2 times)
  - NWA/ECCW Heavyweight Championship (1 time)
- Pro Wrestling Illustrated
- The Future of Wrestling
  - TFW Tag Team Championship (1 time) – with Juggernaut
- Pro Wrestling Illustrated
  - PWI ranked him #269 of the 500 best singles wrestlers in the PWI 500 in 2002

== See also ==
- List of premature professional wrestling deaths
