= El Phantasmo =

Canadian professional wrestler

- El Phantasmo in August 2026

Personal information
- Born: Riley Vigier; October 24, 1986 (age 40) Vancouver, British Columbia, Canada

Professional wrestling career
- Ring name(s): El Phantasmo; ELP; Riley Vincent
- Billed height: 6 ft 0 in (1.83 m)
- Billed weight: 186 lb (84 kg)
- Billed from: Vancouver, British Columbia
- Trained by: Aaron Idol; Disco Fury; Scotty Mac
- Debut: October 30, 2005

Riley Vigier (born October 24, 1986) is a Canadian professional wrestler. He is signed to New Japan Pro-Wrestling (NJPW), where he performs under the ring name El Phantasmo (often shortened to ELP).

In NJPW, Phantasmo was a former member of Bullet Club and became a three-time IWGP Junior Heavyweight Tag Team Champion (all with Taiji Ishimori) and a two-time Super J-Cup winner while in the stable. Starting in 2023, he transitioned into the heavyweight division and would also be kicked out of Bullet Club, leading to him joining the Guerrillas of Destiny. He would team with Hikuleo, with whom he became a two-time Strong Openweight Tag Team Champion and one-time IWGP Tag Team Champion, and at one time held both sets of tag team championships simultaneously. He won his first NJPW singles title, the NJPW World Television Championship, at Wrestle Kingdom 19 in January 2025. He has also worked for Impact Wrestling, and various independent promotions in Canada, the European Union and the United Kingdom.

== Professional wrestling career ==
=== Extreme Canadian Championship Wrestling (2005–2017) ===
El Phantasmo's wrestling training group in 2005 included Kyle O'Reilly and Gurv Sihra. His ring name is a reference to a song on White Zombie's Astro-Creep: 2000. Phantasmo's debut in professional wrestling for NWA: Extreme Canadian Championship Wrestling (ECCW) was in a battle royal at Halloween Hell in October 2005. Phantasmo formed a tag team with Halo known as the Masked Dudes of Doom. On March 3, 2007, they became the #1 contenders to the NWA/ECCW Tag Team Championship after beating Models, Inc. in a Tables, Ladders, and Chairs match main eventing in Vancouver. After falling short on three occasions, the Masked Dudes of Doom finally won the titles in another TLC match against Chill Town on May 5 in Vancouver. After only one successful title defense, they went on to lose the titles to Greatness on Demand in a six-man tag match on July 27 in Surrey.

A regular competitor in the ECCW Pacific Cup tournament, Phantasmo made it to the finals in two consecutive years. In 2008, Billy Suede won the tournament in the three-way final which also included Phantasmo and O'Reilly. In 2009, Phantasmo finally won the Pacific Cup by beating Rick The Weapon X and Azeem The Dream in the finals. In 2010, however, Phantasmo lost to eventual tournament winner Artemis Spencer in the semi-finals. Though he did present Spencer with the trophy, Phantasmo received a kick to the groin for his show of sportsmanship towards his ex-teammate and rival.

Phantasmo won his first ECCW Championship on July 6, 2013. He lost the championship to "Ravenous" Randy Myers on January 18, 2014, at Ballroom Brawl 1 in a ladder match. He won the ECCW Championship for the second time on January 16, 2016, at Ballroom Brawl 5 by defeating Scotty Mac in a steel cage match. Phantasmo lost the title to O'Reilly on January 14, 2017, at Ballroom Brawl 7, in an open challenge to any TV wrestler. His last match in ECCW for 2017, was on May 27, 2017, for the Canadian Championship, where he was defeated by Andy Bird.

=== Revolution Pro Wrestling (2017–2020, 2023-Present) ===
El Phantasmo debuted for Revolution Pro Wrestling at the Cockpit 17 on June 4, 2017, and was defeated by David Starr. In 2018, he participated in the British J-Cup, a tournament he won. On May 19, 2019, he defeated Starr in a ladder match at RPW's Epic Encounter event to win the RPW British Cruiserweight Championship for the first time. On February 14, 2020, Phantasmo lost the title to Michael Oku, ending his reign at 280 days.

=== New Japan Pro-Wrestling (2019–present) ===
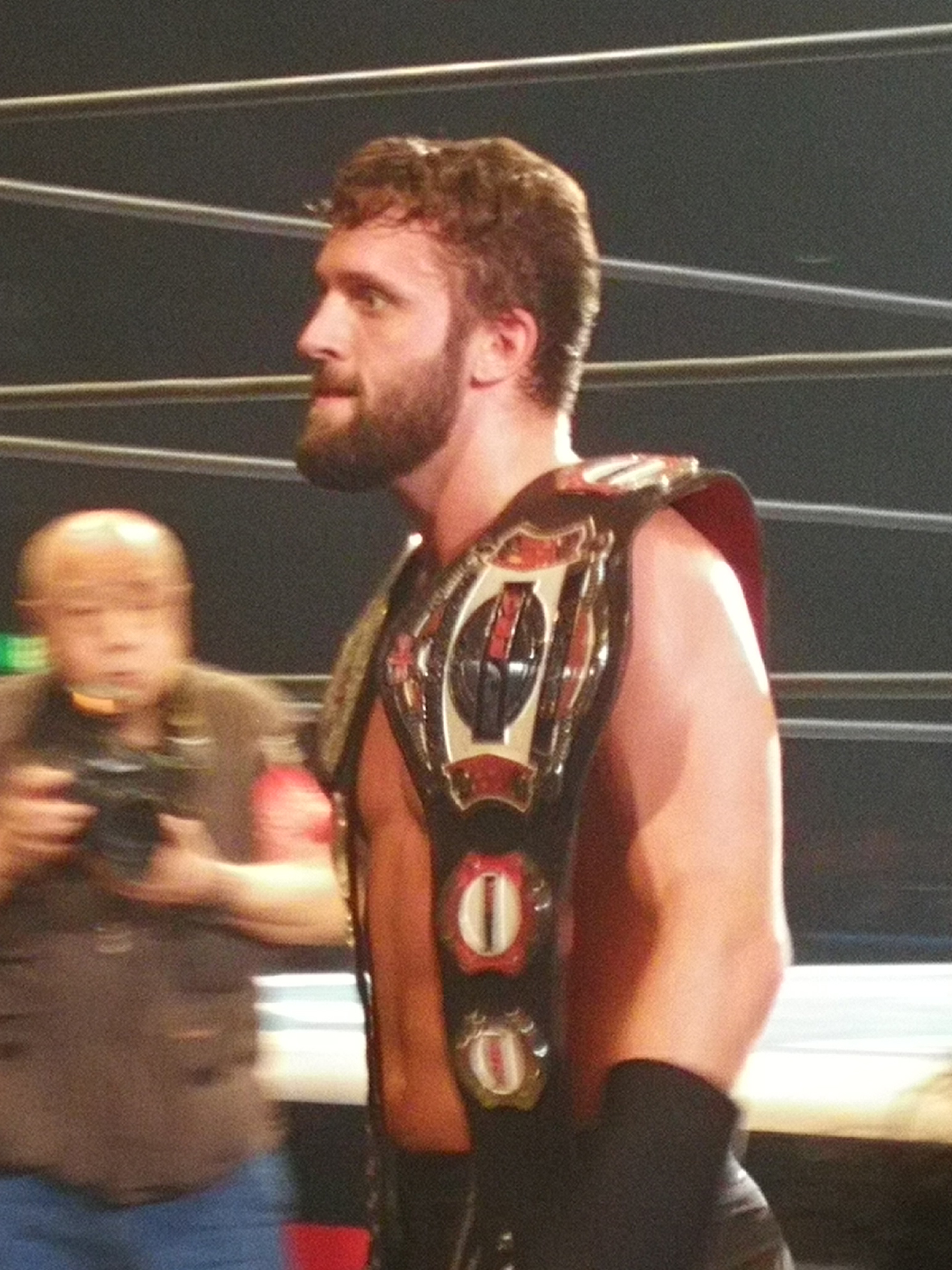
El Phantasmo pictured in November 2019. At the time, he was a double champion, as he was RPW British Cruiserweight Champion and IWGP Junior Heavyweight Tag Team Champion.

==== Bullet Club (2019–2023) ====
During the first night of the New Japan Cup 2019, a vignette was shown promoting El Phantasmo's debut. In doing so, he was announced as the newest member of Bullet Club. In his debut, he pinned Will Ospreay in a tag team match. His first singles win came against Bandido shortly after. Phantasmo then entered the Best of the Super Juniors and ended third in his block ending with 6 wins and 3 losses with a total of 12 points. On June 16, 2019, Phantasmo and Taiji Ishimori defeated Roppongi 3K (Yoh and Sho) to win the IWGP Junior Heavyweight Tag Team Championship. On night four of the Kizuna Road tour, Phantasmo, Yujiro Takahashi and Chase Owens competed for the NEVER Openweight Six-Man Tag Team Championship but were defeated by Ryusuke Taguchi, Togi Makabe and Toru Yano. At night one of Southern Showdown, he defended his RPW British Cruiserweight Championship against Rocky Romero. On August 25, Phantasmo defeated Dragon Lee to win the 2019 Super J-Cup tournament.

At Royal Quest, Phantasmo and Ishimori lost to Chaos (Will Ospreay and Robbie Eagles). At Road To Destruction Yamaguchi, the Bullet Club team of Phantasmo, Owens and Ishimori defeated Eagles, Ospreay and Tomoaki Honma in a six man tag team match. At King of Pro-Wrestling, Phantasmo lost to Ospreay in an IWGP Junior Heavyweight Championship match. At Wrestle Kingdom 14, Phantasmo and Ishimori lost the IWGP Junior Heavyweight Tag Team Championship to Roppongi 3K. At New Year Dash!!, Phantasmo and Ishimori competed in fatal 4-way tag team match which was won by Suzuki-gun (Yoshinobu Kanemaru and El Desperado). On December 12, Phantasmo defeated ACH in the finals of the Super J-Cup. Immediately after the match, Phantasmo called out Hiromu Takahashi and accepted his challenge to a match at Wrestle Kingdom 15, where the winner would face IWGP Junior Heavyweight Champion Ishimori on the second night of Wrestle Kingdom for the title. On night one, Phantasmo lost to Takahashi, who earnt the title match on night two.

On January 23 at the Road to The New Beginning, Phantasmo and Ishimori defeated Desperado and Kanemaru to win the IWGP Junior Tag-Team titles once again., however, they lost them back to the duo a month later. At Castle Attack, Phantasmo failed to win the IWGP Junior Heavyweight Championship, losing a three-way match to Bushi and Desperado. At Kizuna Road, Phantasmo and Ishimori, defeated Roppongi 3K to once again win the IWGP Junior Heavyweight Championships, after Phantasmo hit a superkick which was questioned to be loaded with a metal slug, which was a foreign, illegal weapon. They retained the titles against Mega Coaches (Rocky Romero and Ryusuke Taguchi) at Wrestle Grand Slam in Tokyo Dome. The duo entered the Super Junior Tag League, but the tournament was won by Desperado and Kanemaru. The title match was scheduled for Wrestle Grand Slam in MetLife Dome, where Phantasmo and Ishimori lost the titles.

In November, Phantasmo entered the Best of the Super Juniors tournament and finished with 12 points with a record of 6 wins and 5 losses, failing to advance to the finals. At Wrestle Kingdom 16, Phantasmo and Ishimori, now going by the name of "Bullet Club's Cutest Tag Team", failed to regain the IWGP Junior Heavyweight Tag Team Championship, after losing a three-way match between Mega Coaches and champions Flying Tiger (Robbie Eagles and Tiger Mask), who retained. During the match, Mega Coaches and Flying Tiger, removed Phantasmo's boot and revealed the metal slug, ending his use of the weapon in matches.

During the NJPW New Years Golden Series tour, Bullet Club's Cutest Tag Team failed to capture the Junior Heavyweight titles once again. Around this time, Phantasmo expressed interest in competing as a heavyweight wrestler. After showing promise against heavyweight wrestlers, Phantasmo entered his first heavyweight tournament, the New Japan Cup. He received a bye to the second round, but was defeated by Will Ospreay. Phantasmo continued to be classed as a Junior Heavyweight, as he entered the Best of the Super Juniors, finishing the tournament with 12 points, with a record of 6 wins and 3 losses and the last match loss to El Desperado, preventing him making the finals. At Forbidden Door, Phantasmo teamed with former Bullet Club members The Young Bucks to take on Dudes with Attitude (Sting, Darby Allin and Shingo Takagi), where they were defeated.

Impressive performances earnt Phantasmo a place in the heavyweight G1 Climax 32 tournament, where he competed in the D Block. He finished the tournament with 6 points, failing to advance to the semi-finals. After his tournament campaign ended, Phantasmo officially announced his transition into the Heavyweight division. Following the culmination of the tournament, Phantasmo began a feud with Takagi, the reigning Provisional KOPW Champion, who he had beaten in his final G1 Climax match. This led to a match at Declaration of Power, where Phantasmo was defeated by Takagi in a Who's Your Daddy match, and was thus forced to call Takagi "Daddy". A rematch between the two men, was scheduled for the Provisional KOPW Championship at Rumble on 44th Street, where Phantasmo once again lost to Takagi.

On January 4, 2023, at Wrestle Kingdom 17, Phantasmo competed in the New Japan Ranbo, but failed to last till the final 4. On February 11, at The New Beginning in Osaka, Phantasmo faced Tama Tonga for the NEVER Openweight Championship, but was unsuccessful. The following month, Phantasmo competed in the New Japan Cup, but was eliminated in the first round by Tetsuya Naito. In the following months, Phantasmo began showing signs of growing animosity, with the new Bullet Club leader David Finlay, who had joined the club following his attack on former leader Jay White at Battle in the Valley. The tension culminated in April at Sakura Genesis, where after a tag victory over the Guerrillas of Destiny and Master Wato, Phantasmo and Finlay began shoving one another with Kenta and Gedo attempting to separate the two stablemates. However, Gedo and Kenta instead attacked Phantasmo with Kenta hitting a Go 2 Sleep on Phantasmo. Soon after, Phantasmo's longtime tag-team partner Taiji Ishimori entered the ring, joining the attack and hitting Phantasmo with a low blow. The four men posed in the ring, confirming Phantasmo's removal from Bullet Club. At Wrestling Dontaku, Phantasmo made his return to the promotion and turned face by attacking Finlay. At Dominion, Phantasmo unsuccessfully challenged Finlay for the NEVER Openweight Championship.

==== Guerillas of Destiny (2023–2024) ====
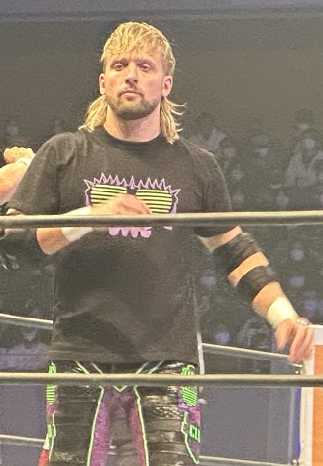
El Phantasmo in 2023

On June 25, Phantasmo competed on the buy-in of Forbidden Door, which was held in Toronto, defeating All Elite Wrestling's Stu Grayson. The following month, Phantasmo competed in the annual G1 Climax tournament. Phantasmo competed in the B Block, finishing with 6 points, narrowly missing out on a place in the quarterfinals, following a loss to Will Ospreay in his final block match. Following this, Phantasmo aligned himself with the Guerillas of Destiny stable, who were all also former Bullet Club members. Phantasmo officially joined the stable on the final day of the G1 tournament.

On October 9 at Destruction in Ryogoku, Phantasmo and Hikuleo defeated Bullet Club War Dogs (Alex Coughlin and Gabe Kidd) to become the new Strong Openweight Tag Team Champions. From November 25 until December 6, Hikuleo and Phantasmo took part in the 2023 World Tag League, where they won their block with a record of five wins and two losses, advancing to the semifinals of the tournament. On December 8, Phantasmo and Hikuleo defeated Mikey Nicholls and Shane Haste in the semifinals and then were defeated by IWGP Tag Team Champions Bishamon (Hirooki Goto and Yoshi-Hashi) on December 10 in the finals of the World Tag League. As winners and champions, Bishamon challenged Hikuleo and Phantasmo to a rematch for both IWGP and the Strong Openweight Tag Team Championships in a Winner Takes All match. On January 4, 2024 at Wrestle Kingdom 18, Phantasmo and Hikuleo defeated Bishamon in the match, becoming double tag team champions. They lost the IWGP Tag Team Championship to Chase Owens and KENTA on February 11 at The New Beginning in Osaka. On April 12 at Windy City Riot, Phantasmo and Hikuleo lost the Strong Openweight Tag Team Championship to TMDK (Mikey Nicholls and Shane Haste) in a four corners match, but would regain them on May 11 at Resurgence. On June 6 at Dominion 6.9 in Osaka-jo Hall, Phantasmo and Hikuleo lost the Strong Openweight Tag Team Championships back to TMDK in a Winner Takes All match involving the IWGP Tag Team Championships. Following this match, it was reported that Hikuleo would be departing NJPW, leaving Phantasmo as a singles wrestler once again.

==== Singles competition (2024–present) ====
At Korakuen Hall on December 22, Phantasmo made a stunning return announcing that he was cancer-free and, with a decisive shot to Ren Narita, declared that he would be competing for the NJPW World TV Championship. On January 4, 2025, at Wrestle Kingdom 19, Phantasmo won the title in a Four-way match. He lost the title to Great-O-Khan at Sakura Genesis. He later won the title back from Great-O-Khan at NJPW Wrestling Hizen no Kuni on April 29, 2025. On May 3, 2025, Phantasmo defended the NJPW World Television Championship against NEVER Openweight Champion Konosuke Takeshita in a time limit draw. It was then announced that Takeshita would defend the NEVER Openweight Championship against Phantasmo at Resurgence. At the event, Phantasmo failed to win the NEVER Openweight Championship from Takeshita.On June 29 at Tanahashi Jam, Phantasmo successfully defended the title against Taiji Ishimori.

On February 27, 2026 at The New Beginning USA, Phantasmo lost the World TV Championship to Konosuke Takeshita, ending his second reign at 304 days.

=== Impact Wrestling (2021–2023) ===
On the April 29, 2021 episode of Impact!, it was announced via vignette that El Phantasmo would make his Impact Wrestling debut sometime in the following weeks. During the next episode, Phantasmo made his in-ring debut, soundly defeating enhancement talent, VSK. The week afterwards, Phantasmo won a six-way, number-one contender's match for the right to challenge Josh Alexander for the Impact X Division Championship at Under Siege. At the event, he failed to defeat Alexander for the title. Phantasmo made his return to the company on the September 23 episode of Impact!, assisting fellow Bullet Club members Hikuleo and Chris Bey during their feud against FinJuice (David Finlay and Juice Robinson). In October, Phantasmo entered a tournament to determine the new X Division Champion, where he defeated Willie Mack and Rohit Raju in the first round, but lost to Trey Miguel in the final at Bound for Glory.

On May 7, 2022, at Under Siege, Phantasmo made his return to the company by teaming with Bullet Club for a 10-man tag team match against Honor No More in a losing effort.

On August 20, 2023, at Multiverse United 2, The World (Phantasmo, The DKC, Josh Alexander, PCO and Guerrillas of Destiny (Tama Tonga and Tanga Loa)) lost to Bullet Club (Kenta, ABC (Ace Austin and Chris Bey) and Bullet Club War Dogs (Alex Coughlin, Clark Connors and David Finlay) in a 12 man tag team match.

=== All Elite Wrestling / Ring of Honor (2022–present) ===
Due to NJPW's working relationshp with All Elite Wrestling (AEW), Phantasmo has appeared at the co-promoted event Forbidden Door in 2022, 2023 and 2024, teaming with The Young Bucks in a six-man tag team match in his debut, defeating Stu Grayson in 2023, and competing in the AEW TNT Championship ladder match in 2024. In 2026 Phantasmo also began appearing for AEW's sister promotion Ring of Honor (ROH). On August 18, he faced Adam Priest on an ROH YouTube special. He later competed at Death Before Dishonor on August 21, where he defeated Adam Brooks on the Zero Hour pre-show. On October 15, Phantasmo challenged Action Andretti for the ROH World Television Championship. The match ended in a 15-minute time-limit draw, allowing Andretti to retain the title. After the match, Phantasmo demanded another opportunity and attacked Andretti with his championship belt.

== Personal life ==
Before moving to England in 2017 to pursue wrestling full-time, Vigier worked as a graphic designer and editor for Electronic Arts and Bardel Entertainment. He has also designed posters for NJPW Strong events and his own merchandise.

In October 2024, Vigier was diagnosed with cancer. On December 22, 2024, he announced that he had beaten cancer.

== Championships and accomplishments ==
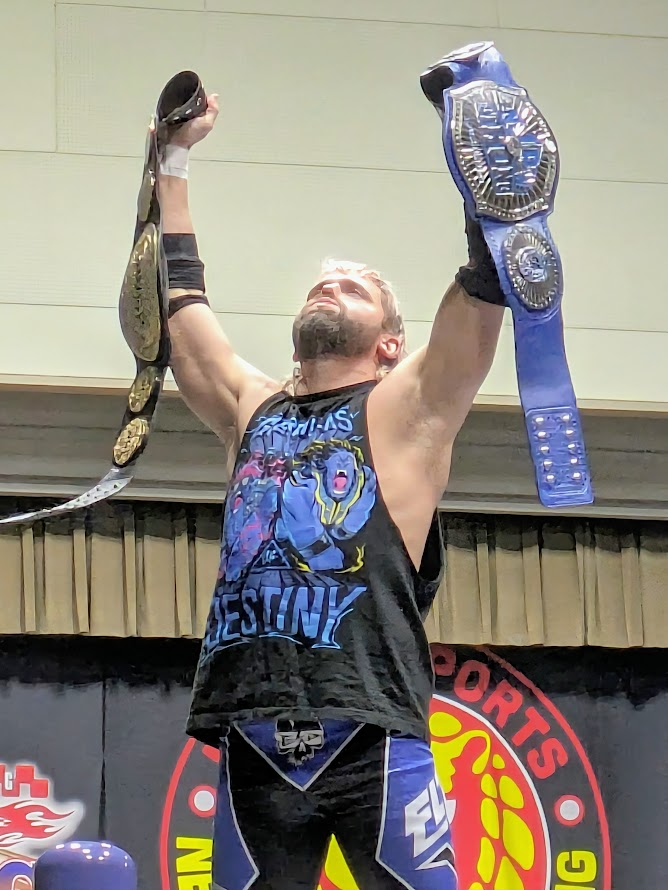
In New Japan Pro-Wrestling, Phantasmo is an IWGP Tag Team Champion, a two-time Strong Openweight Tag Team Champion...

...and a two-time NJPW World Television Champion.

- German Wrestling Federation
  - Light Heavyweight World Cup (2019)
- New Japan Pro-Wrestling
  - NJPW World Television Championship (2 times)
  - IWGP Junior Heavyweight Tag Team Championships (3 times) – with Taiji Ishimori
  - Strong Openweight Tag Team Championship (2 times) – with Hikuleo
  - IWGP Tag Team Championship (1 time) – with Hikuleo
  - Super J-Cup (2019, 2020)
- NWA: Extreme Canadian Championship Wrestling
  - ECCW Championship (3 times)
  - ECCW Tag Team Championship (1 time) – with Halo
  - Pacific Cup Tournament (2009)
  - Most Popular Wrestler of the Year (2008)
  - Wrestler of the Year award (2008)
- Pro Wrestling Illustrated
  - Ranked No. 91 of the top 500 singles wrestlers in the PWI 500 in 2025
- Revolution Pro Wrestling
  - RPW British Cruiserweight Championship (1 time)
  - British J-Cup (2018)
- WrestleCore
  - WrestleCore Infinity Championship (1 time)

== Luchas de Apuestas record ==
Winner (wager)	Loser (wager)	Location	Event	Date	Notes
El Phantasmo (mask)	Halo (mask)	Surrey, British Columbia	Live event	July 25, 2008	
El Phantasmo (mask) and Rick The Weapon X	The Divine Prophet (beard) and Artemis Spencer	Surrey, British Columbia	Live event	January 29, 2010	
