= NWA Pacific Northwest Junior Heavyweight Championship =

Details
- Promotion: National Wrestling Alliance; Elite Canadian Championship Wrestling
- Date established: October 20, 1998
- Date retired: January 26, 2007
Statistics
- First champion(s): Tony Kozina
- Most reigns: Tony Kozina (six reigns)
- Longest reign: Havoc (364 days)

The NWA Pacific Northwest Junior Heavyweight Championship was the junior heavyweight championship of Elite Canadian Championship Wrestling, a member of the National Wrestling Alliance based in Vancouver, British Columbia. The championship was considered a secondary championship to the NWA Canadian Junior Heavyweight Championship, with both belts being defended in the promotion. The championship was established in 1998, with Tony Kozina as the first champion. The belt was deactivated in 2007.

== Title history ==
Wrestler:	Times:	Date:	Location:	Notes:
Tony Kozina	1	October 20, 1998	Lilooet, British Columbia	
Torch	1	October 21, 1998	100 Mile House, British Columbia	
Tony Kozina	2	October 23, 1998	Fraser Lake, British Columbia	
Torch	2	October 24, 1998	Burns Lake, British Columbia	
Tony Kozina	3	November 20, 1998	Campbell River, British Columbia	
Ladies Choice	1	January 29, 1999	New Westminster, British Columbia	
Tony Kozina	4	February 26, 1999	New Westminster, British Columbia	
Disco Fury	1	May 13, 1999	Maple Ridge, British Columbia	Defeated Tony Kozina and Torch in a Triple Threat match.
Tony Kozina	5	May 15, 1999	Powell River, British Columbia	Kozina vacates the title on July 22, 1999 to concentrate on the NWA Canadian Junior Heavyweight Championship.
Ladies Choice	2	August 20, 1999	New Westminster, British Columbia	Defeated Strife and Chance Beckett in a 3-way Dance to win the vacant title.
Torch	3	May 26, 2000	New Westminster, British Columbia	
Scotty Mac	1	April 28, 2001	Vancouver, Washington	Defeated Disco Fury and Tony Kozina in a 3-way match.
Tony Kozina	6	July 21, 2001	Vancouver, Washington	Vacant in 2002.
Havoc	1	April 5, 2002	Chehalis, Washington	Defeats Seth Knight in a tournament final.
Scotty Mac	2	April 4, 2003	Kelowna, British Columbia	Vacant in 2003.
Matt Classic	1	August 22, 2003	Surrey, British Columbia	Defeats Memphis Raines in a tournament final. The title is vacated when Classic relocates to Montreal.
Memphis Raines	1	April 1, 2005	Port Coquitlam, British Columbia	Defeated Aaron Idol and Chance Beckett in a triple threat match.
Aaron Idol	1	May 27, 2005	Surrey, British Columbia	Defeated Memphis Raines and Chance Beckett in a triple threat match.
Mikey Dasheezits	1	February 17, 2006	Vancouver, British Columbia	
Gurv Sihra	1	May 26, 2006	Comox, British Columbia	
Harv Sihra	1	January 26, 2007	Surrey, British Columbia	The Sihras reunite after the match and throw down the belt; the title is deactivated immediately after.
Deactivated	—	January 26, 2007	Surrey, British Columbia	The Sihras reunite after the match and throw down the belt; the title is deactivated immediately after.

== See also ==
- List of National Wrestling Alliance championships
