= ECCW Vancouver Island Championship =

ECCW Vancouver Island Heavyweight Championship

Details
- Promotion: Elite Canadian Championship Wrestling (ECCW)
- Date established: May 9, 1998
- Date retired: 2012

Other names
- ECCW Vancouver Island Championship; ECCW Vancouver Island Heavyweight Championship
Statistics
- First champion: Destruction
- Final champion: BJ Laredo
- Most reigns: Lumberjack Bubba; Randy Tyler; Azeem The Dream (2 reigns)

The ECCW Vancouver Island Heavyweight Championship is a secondary title in Elite Canadian Championship Wrestling. As its name suggests, the title is defended almost exclusively at ECCW events on Vancouver Island, in cities such as Nanaimo and Victoria. Sanctioned by the National Wrestling Alliance, the title was promoted as the NWA Vancouver Island Heavyweight Championship. It originally lasted from 1998 until some time after the last champion, Rockford 2000, won the title in 2001, then was reactivated in 2007 when Sid Sylum began claiming the title.

== Title history ==
As of 15 March 2026.

Names	Years
ECCW Vancouver Island Championship	N/A
ECCW Vancouver Island Heavyweight Championship	N/A

Key
No.	Overall reign number
Reign	Reign number for the specific champion
Days	Number of days held
+	Current reign is changing daily

No.	Champion	Championship change			Reign statistics		Notes	Ref.
No.	Champion	Date	Event	Location	Reign	Days	Notes	Ref.
Extreme Canadian Championship Wrestling (ECCW), National Wrestling Alliance (NWA) and Elite Canadian Championship Wrestling (ECCW)
†	Gorgeous Michelle Starr	August 16, 1996	—	Nanaimo, BC	1	1	Starr defeated Mike Roselli to become the inaugural champion.	
—	Unified	August 17, 1996	—	Nanaimo, BC	—	—	Mike Roselli defeated Starr in a rematch to unify the Vancouver Island Championship with the ECCW Heavyweight Championship.	
1	Destruction	May 9, 1998		Parksville, BC	1	N/A	Wins a bunkhouse battle royal to become the inaugural champion.	
2	Lumberjack Bubba	June 6, 1998		Duncan, BC	1	N/A		
3	"Rocket" Randy Tyler	November 8, 1998		Cowichan Valley, BC	1	N/A		
—	Vacated	November 1998	—	—	—	—	Tyler is stripped of the title by NWA president Howard Brody	
4	Lumberjack Bubba	November 20, 1998		Campbell River, BC	2	N/A	Defeated Mike Roselli to win the vacant title.	
5	Michelle Starr	April 22, 1999		Nanaimo, BC	1	N/A		
—	Vacated	1999	—	—	—	—	Starr is stripped of the title due to also holding the NWA Canadian Heavyweight and NWA/ECCW Pacific Northwest Heavyweight Championships	
6	Randy Tyler	July 24, 1999		Nanaimo, BC	2	N/A	Defeats Steve Rizzono	
—	Vacated	October 1999	—	—	—	—	Tyler is stripped for failing to defend the title.	
7	Steve Rizzono	October 1, 1999		Victoria, BC	1	N/A	Defeats Bomber & Juggernaut in 3-way tournament final	
8	Mad Bomber	November 6, 1999		Quesnel, BC	1			
9	Ladies Choice	February 18, 2000		Nanaimo, BC	1	N/A		
10	Rockford 2000	July 27, 2001		Victoria, BC	1	N/A	Still champion as of January 26, 2002	
—	Deactivated	–	—	–	–	–	The title became deactivated	
11	Sid Sylum	December 1, 2007			1	N/A	Sylum declares himself as champion after winning the 2007 Vancouver Island Cup Tournament, defeating Kyle O'Reilly on August 19, 2007, in Nanaimo, BC	
12	Cremator	April 25, 2009		Nanaimo, BC	1	N/A		
13	Azeem The Dream	January 22, 2011		Victoria, BC	1	N/A		
14	Jamie Diaz	March 18, 2011		Surrey, BC	1	N/A		
15	Azeem The Dream	April 29, 2011		Surrey, BC	2	N/A		
16	BJ Laredo	December 1, 2012		Duncan, BC	1	N/A		
—	Deactivated	–	—	–	–	–	The title once more became deactivated in 2012.	

== See also ==
- Professional wrestling in Canada
- Elite Canadian Championship Wrestling
- National Wrestling Alliance
