= Billy Suede =

Canadian professional wrestler

Personal information
- Born: East Vancouver, British Columbia, Canada

Professional wrestling career
- Ring name: Billy Suede
- Billed height: 5 ft 7 in (1.70 m)
- Billed weight: 167 lb (76 kg)
- Billed from: East Vancouver, British Columbia, Canada
- Trained by: Storm Wrestling Academy
- Debut: February 24, 2007

Billy Suede is a professional wrestler based out of Western Canada. He is best known for working for NWA: Extreme Canadian Championship Wrestling, but has competed for independent promotions in Canada and the United States, as well as in the Philippines.

Suede is one of a few wrestlers who came to ECCW after training in Alberta with Lance Storm.

== Professional wrestling career ==
=== PowerZone Wrestling ===
Suede made his professional debut on February 24, 2007 with PZW, losing to JR Trinidad in Medicine Hat, Alberta. He appeared on a few more shows before returning to BC.

=== Extreme Canadian Championship Wrestling ===
Billy Suede debuted for NWA: Extreme Canadian Championship Wrestling on April 21, 2007 in Port Coquitlam in a loss to Kyle O'Reilly. A few weeks later, Suede teamed with O'Reilly to defeat Bryan Danielson and Sid Sylum for his first victory in wrestling. A month after winning the Pacific Cup, on July 5, 2008 Suede won the NWA Canadian Junior Heavyweight Championship from O'Reilly. On October 3, 2009, Suede defeated Memphis to win the NWA/ECCW Heavyweight Championship for the first time.

Even as a champion already, Suede teamed with Kenny Lush in a tournament to decide new ECCW Tag Team Champions. The tournament stretched out over multiple shows, with Suede and Lush beating Egos & Icons to win the ECCW Tag Team Championship on November 7 in Vancouver.

==== Pacific Cup ====
Having made an impact in the tournament since his rookie year, Suede made it to the semi-finals of the 2007 Pacific Cup before losing to Tony Kozina. However, Billy would not be denied and won the tournament in 2008, beating CJ Strongheart and Danni Deeds before winning the three-way final against El Phantasmo and Kyle O'Reilly. 2009 saw Suede lose to Rick the Weapon X in the second round, continuing his streak of winning at least the first round match in every year he has participated in the tournament. The streak continued in 2010, as Billy lost in the second round to O'Reilly.

=== Philippine Wrestling Revolution ===
On February 26, 2017, Suede moved to the Philippines and competed in the Philippine Wrestling Revolution. He debuted against Chilly Willy who wrestled under the name Blackzilla. In July 2017, he defeated defending champion Chris Panzer to win the PWR Championship. Suede however lost the title back to Panzer during a triple threat match involving Ralph Imbayashi at PWR: Sugod. Suede then faced fellow Canadian Zayden Trudeau at Oktoberplex in a match which he dubbed the All-Canadian Classic. The two wrestled an intense match, exchanging enzuigiris and submissions to send the crowd into a frenzy but Trudeau came up victorious in the end. In September 22, 2019, Suede returned in PWR Live: Beautiful (named after his moniker) and faced Mike Madrigal in a winning effort.

== Championships and accomplishments ==
- NWA: Extreme Canadian Championship Wrestling
  - ECCW Heavyweight Championship (1 time)
  - ECCW Tag Team Championship (2 times) - Kenny Lush (1) and Tony Baroni (1)
  - ECCW Pacific Cup Tournament (2008)
  - NWA Canadian Junior Heavyweight Championship (1 time)
- PWR: Philippine Wrestling Revolution
  - PWR Championship (1 time)
