= Rick Patterson (wrestler) =

Pro wrestler

Personal information
- Born: Rick Patterson; 6 July 1969 Springfield, Manitoba, Canada

Professional wrestling career
- Ring name(s): Rick Patterson; Leatherface; Ricky Bruno; Armond Tanzarion
- Billed height: 6"4
- Billed weight: 270 lb (122 kg)
- Trained by: Walter Shefchuck, Al Tomko
- Debut: 1982
- Retired: Still active

Richard Patterson (born 6 July 1969) is a Canadian professional wrestler who is known as Leatherface and spent his career in Canada, Amman Jordan, Mexico, New Zealand, Japan, and South Korea

== Professional wrestling career ==
Rick Patterson made his professional wrestling debut in 1982 in Winnipeg. In 1983, Patterson made his debut in Vancouver for NWA All-Star Wrestling where he became a four-time NWA Canadian Tag Team Championship. He also worked for Stampede Wrestling in Calgary, Maritimes, the Central States, Puerto Rico and Mexico.

In 1988, he was the last to win the NWA Central States Tag Team Championship with Stevie Ray before the promotion folded.

In 1993 Patterson became Leatherface in Japan for W*ING and tied it in with the villain of the same name from the movie The Texas Chainsaw Massacre a gimmick given by Víctor Quiñones. Michael Penzel formerly known as Corporal Kirchner in the WWF was the original Leatherface who was sent to jail for six months following an attempted assault by a fan, which left the fan with severe facial injuries. Later went to International Wrestling Association of Japan.

Leatherface later teamed with Penzel after being released from prison in 1994. Penzle was known as Super Leatherface/Original Leatherface. later had matches with Terry Funk, and Mick Foley. In 1996, he teamed with Eddie Watts as Steelface.

Later in his career, he returned to Canada, surviving the Canadian Death Tour and continued to work in Japan.

On May 25, 2015, he defeated Bob Sapp in the Korean promotion World Wrestling Association to win the vacant WWA World Heavyweight Championship. Two days later, he teamed up with Sapp against Hong Sang Jin and Kim Jong Wang, but they lost. It was the final match of his professional career.

== Championships and accomplishments ==
- NWA All-Star Wrestling
  - NWA Canadian Tag Team Championship (Vancouver version) (4 times) - with Timothy Flowers (1), Randy Rich (1) Rick Davis (1) and Sonny Myers (1)
- Heart of America Sports Attractions
  - NWA Central States Tag Team Championship (2 times) – with Mike Stone (1) and Steve Ray (1)
- NWA: Extreme Canadian Championship Wrestling
  - NWA/ECCW Hardcore Championship (1 time)
- World Wrestling Association (South Korea)
  - WWA World Heavyweight Championship (1 time)
  - WWA World Tag Team Championship (2 times) – with King Man (1) and Kenny Lush (1)

=== Luchas de Apuestas record ===
Winner (wager)	Loser (wager)	Location	Event	Date	Notes
Vampiro (hair)	Rick Patterson (hair)	Monterrey, Nuevo León	Live event	June 28, 1992	
Latin Lover (wrestler) (hair)	Rick Patterson (hair)	Monterrey, Nuevo León	Live event	Unknown	
