= Dr. Luther =

Canadian professional wrestler

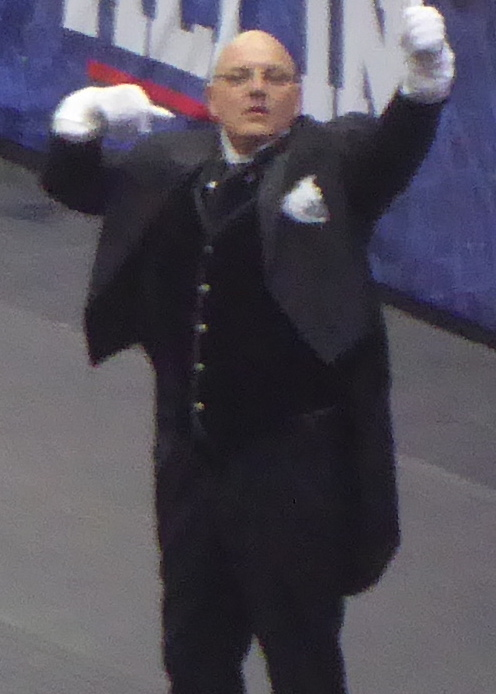
- Luther in 2024

Personal information
- Born: Len Olson; October 30, 1968 (age 57) Calgary, Alberta, Canada

Professional wrestling career
- Ring name(s): Atomic Punk; Dr. Luther; Lenny St. Clair; Luther; Mad Jack; Father Dante
- Billed height: 6 ft 1 in (1.85 m)
- Billed weight: 255 lb (116 kg)
- Billed from: The Kingdom of Nye
- Trained by: Hart Dungeon
- Debut: 1988

YouTube information
- Channel: LuthersWorldOf
- Subscribers: 3.44 thousand
- Views: 40.9 thousand
- Last updated: July 12, 2025

Len Olson (born October 30, 1968), better known by the ring names Dr. Luther or simply Luther, is a Canadian professional wrestler signed to All Elite Wrestling (AEW), where he works as both a wrestler and producer. He is also known for his appearances in Japan for Frontier Martial-Arts Wrestling (FMW), WAR, and IWA Japan in the 1990s. Olson has also appeared in numerous promotions throughout the Canadian independent circuit in the 1990s and 2000s.

== Professional wrestling career ==
=== Early career (1988–1992) ===
Olson was born and raised in Calgary, and was brought up with Stampede Wrestling. He was trained by Keith Hart in the Hart Dungeon. On April 12, 1991, Olson lost to Chris Jericho in CNWA. He continued to wrestle in Calgary until 1992.

=== Frontier Martial-Arts Wrestling (1992–1994) ===
In 1992, Olson was invited on a tour of Japan with the Frontier Martial-Arts Wrestling promotion. Told to develop a character for himself, Olson donned a straitjacket and face mask and adopted the ring name "Dr. Luther". As Dr. Luther, Olson would throw chairs and run into the audience, quickly becoming a popular and feared wrestler.

Olson teamed with Dr. Hannibal (Steve Gillespie). He feuded with many Japanese like Tarzan Goto, Hayabusa, Mr. Gannosuke and Atsushi Onita. He feuded with other wrestlers such as Sabu, The Sheik and Mike Awesome, who was known as the Gladiator. In February 1993, he and Dr. Hannibal joined the original Team Canada, which included The Gladiator, Big Titan, and Ricky Fuji.

In 1992, Olson held the AWA World Light Heavyweight Championship.

On May 5, 1993, Dr. Luther and Hannibal Lector (Dr. Hannibal) lost to Sabu and Sabu's uncle The Sheik. By 1994, Olson left Japan and wrestled in various promotions. In 2001 he returned to FMW and won the tag team titles with Biomonster DNA.

=== WAR and IWA Japan (1995–1997) ===
In July 1995, Olson appeared with the Japanese promotion WAR. He returned to the promotion in March 1996, regularly teaming with Big Titan.

He returned to Japan in 1996 and teamed with Freddie Krueger until 1997.

=== ECW and WCW (1998, 2000) ===
In August 1998 Dr. Luther competed in two matches for Extreme Championship Wrestling losing to Mike Awesome and Tommy Rogers.

On August 26, 2000, Olson was on World Championship Wrestling's WCW Worldwide as Mad Jack losing to Vampiro.

=== Independent circuit (1997–2004, 2009–2020) ===
In 1998 Dr. Luther made his debut in Elite Canadian Championship Wrestling (ECCW) based in British Columbia. In April 2000 he lost to Kurrgan. On November 23, 2000, Luther won the ECCW Heavyweight title by defeating The Juggernaut. He held the title for 373 days until losing it to Chance Beckett on December 1, 2001. During the title reign, Luther retained his titles by defeating Sabu, Tommy Dreamer and Christopher Daniels. He left in 2002.

After ECCW Luther left the company in 2002 and went to other independents. He stopped in Portland, Oregon, wrestling for Portland Wrestling. He lost to Raven on September 3, 2004. His last feud was with Skag Rollins. He retired in 2004.

In 2009 he returned and wrestled in Marysville, Washington. In 2011 he wrestled in Hollywood as Father Dante. In 2016 Dr. Luther returned to wrestling in ECCW.

=== All Elite Wrestling (2020–present) ===
Dr. Luther began working with All Elite Wrestling in late 2019. On the January 8, 2020 edition of Dynamite, Luther made his first television appearance during a match for the AEW Women's World Championship between Riho and Kris Statlander as the fourth member of the heel Nightmare Collective stable (which consisted of Awesome Kong, Brandi Rhodes, and Mel). However, the angle was badly received by fans and was dropped in February after Kong left the promotion to film the final season of GLOW. Luther made his in ring debut for the promotion on the February 28th edition of Dark in a winning effort against Sonny Kiss. On March 11, Olson was officially signed to a contract with AEW as both a performer and working in an unspecified role in the AEW office. Luther would then form the Chaos Project tag team with Serpentico on AEW Dark, where they developed a winning streak. On the September 30 episode of Dynamite, Luther and Serpentico attacked Chris Jericho and Jake Hager after Jericho provoked Luther thus setting up a match for the following week. The following week on Jericho's 30 year anniversary show, Luther and Serpentico in their debut match on Dynamite were defeated by Jericho and Hager.

On October 25, 2023 edition of Dynamite, Luther became the valet of "Timeless" Toni Storm, serving as a butler character to her Golden age of Hollywood starlet persona. Luther would turn face after Storm's protégé and understudy, Mariah May, won the Women's Owen Hart Cup and turned on him and Storm. After Storm lost the AEW Women's World Championship to May at All In, both Luther and Storm went on a hiatus from AEW. With Storm's re-emergence as "Timeless" in late January 2025, Luther made his return to Storm's side on the February 8 episode of Collision.

== Championships and accomplishments ==
- Canadian Rocky Mountain Wrestling
  - CRMW Mid-Heavyweight Championship (2 times)
- DOA Pro Wrestling
  - DOA Heavyweight Championship (1 time)
- Elite Canadian Championship Wrestling
  - ECCW Championship (1 time)
  - ECCW Tag Team Championship (4 times) – with Incubus (2) and Juggernaut (1) and Randy Myers (1)
- Frontier Martial-Arts Wrestling
  - AWA World Light Heavyweight Championship (1 time)
- Indigenous Wrestling Alliance
  - IWA Heavyweight Championship (1 time)
- North American Wrestling
  - NAW Heavyweight Championship (2 times)
- West Coast Championship Wrestling
  - WCCW Heavyweight Championship (1 time)
- Western Canada Extreme Wrestling
  - WCEW Tag Team Championship (1 time) – with Juggernaut
