= NWA Canadian Heavyweight Championship =

Professional wrestling championship

ECCW Canadian Championship

Details
- Promotion: National Wrestling Alliance (NWA); Elite Canadian Championship Wrestling (ECCW)
- Date established: December 17, 1978
- Date retired: N/A N/A, 2020

Other names
- NWA Canadian Heavyweight Championship (1978–2011); NWA ECCW Canadian Heavyweight Championship (2011–2014); ECCW Canadian Championship (2014–2020)
Statistics
- First champion: Dino Bravo
- Final champion: Travis Williams
- Most reigns: Angelo Mosca (5 times)
- Longest reign: Scotty Mac (743 days)
- Shortest reign: Sylver, Brian (2 days)

The ECCW Canadian Championship was the top singles title in Maple Leaf Wrestling from 1978 until 1984, when it was abandoned after the Toronto promotion partnered with the World Wrestling Federation (WWF). Its national scope was in name only, similar to the NWA National Heavyweight Championship in Georgia. The title was reinstated as the present-day, NWA Board-controlled version of the NWA Canadian Heavyweight title. Previous versions also existed in Calgary, Halifax and Vancouver. Has been defended in the World Wrestling Federation.

== Reigns ==
Names	Years
NWA Canadian Heavyweight Championship	1978–2011
NWA ECCW Canadian Heavyweight Championship	2011–2014
ECCW Canadian Championship	2014–present

Key
No.	Overall reign number
Reign	Reign number for the specific champion
Days	Number of days held
+	Current reign is changing daily

No.	Champion	Championship change			Reign statistics		Notes	Ref.
No.	Champion	Date	Event	Location	Reign	Days	Notes	Ref.
National Wrestling Alliance (NWA) and Maple Leaf Wrestling (MLW)
1	Dino Bravo	December 17, 1978	Stampede show	Toronto, ON	1	113	Defeated Gene Kiniski to become the first champion.	
2	Greg Valentine	March 8, 1979	Stampede show	Toronto, ON	1	56		
3	Dino Bravo	June 3, 1979	Stampede show	Toronto, ON	2	98		
—	Vacated	September 2, 1979	N/A	N/A	—	—	Bravo left the promotion.	
4	Dewey Robertson	September 9, 1979	Stampede show	Toronto, ON	1	260	Defeated Greg Valentine in tournament final	
5	Great Hossein Arab	May 25, 1980	Stampede show	Toronto, ON	1	56		
6	Angelo Mosca	July 20, 1980	Stampede show	Toronto, ON	1	21		
7	Great Hossein Arab	August 10, 1980	Stampede show	Toronto, ON	2	140		
8	Angelo Mosca	December 28, 1980	Stampede show	Toronto, ON	2	197		
9	Mr. Fuji	July 12, 1981	Stampede show	Toronto, ON	1	14		
10	Angelo Mosca	July 26, 1981	Stampede show	Toronto, ON	3	56		
11	Big John Studd	September 20, 1981	Stampede show	Toronto, ON	1	119		
12	Angelo Mosca	January 17, 1982	Stampede show	Toronto, ON	4	554		
13	Sgt. Slaughter	July 24, 1983	Stampede show	Toronto, ON	1	182		
14	Angelo Mosca	January 22, 1984	Stampede show	Toronto, ON	5	(Note: The exact length of Mosca's fifth reign is unknown. It may have lasted between 39 and 69 days.)		
—	Vacated	March 22, 1984	N/A	N/A	—	—	Championship vacated for undocumented reasons.	
15	Ivan Koloff	April 29, 1984	Stampede show	Toronto, ON	1	42	Defeated Brian Adidas in tournament final.	
16	Angelo Mosca Jr.	June 10, 1984	Stampede show	Toronto, ON	1	(Note: The exact length of Mosca Jr.'s first reign is unknown. It may have lasted between 21 and 51 days.)		
—	Deactivated	July 15, 1984	N/A	N/A	—	—	Maple Leaf Wrestling was sold to the World Wrestling Federation	
National Wrestling Alliance (NWA)
17	E.Z. Ryder	October 24, 1998	Stampede show	Cherry Hill, New Jersey	1	245	Defeated Paul Atlas, who was filling in for Mr. Gillis, at the NWA 50th Anniversary Show.	
18	Michelle Starr	June 26, 1999	Stampede show	Winnipeg, Manitoba	1	30		
19	E.Z. Ryder	July 25, 1999	Stampede show	Victoria, BC	2	145		
20	Carlsen	November 27, 1999	Stampede show	Winnipeg, Manitoba	1	(Note: The exact length of Crusher Carlsen's first reign is unknown. It may have lasted between 279 and 308 days.)		
—	Vacated	September 20, 2000	N/A	N/A	—	—	Championship vacated for undocumented reasons	
21	E.Z. Ryder	October 13, 2001	Stampede show	St. Petersburg, Florida	3	57	Defeated Juggernaut at the NWA 53rd Anniversary Show to win the vacant championship.	
22	Spyder	December 9, 2001	Stampede show	St. Boniface, Manitoba	1	89	Defeated Ryder and Baron von Meaner in a Triple Threat Steel Cage Match.	
23	Sylver, Brian	March 8, 2002	Stampede show	Winnipeg, Manitoba	1	2		
24	Spyder	March 10, 2002	Stampede show	Winnipeg, Manitoba	2	182		
25	Machine	September 8, 2002	Stampede show	Winnipeg, Manitoba	1	(Note: The exact length of The Machine's first reign is unknown. It may have lasted between 1 and 22 days.)		
—	Vacated	September 2, 2002	N/A	N/A	—	—	Championship held up by NWA President Jim Miller after The Machine defeated Spyder.	
26	Spyder	October 18, 2002	Stampede show	Winnipeg, Manitoba	3	140	Defeated The Machine to win held-up title.	
—	Vacated	March 7, 2003	N/A	N/A	—	—	Spyder was suspended by the NWA.	
27	Mercury	March 7, 2003	Stampede show	Winnipeg, Manitoba	1	71	Defeated Brian Jewel.	
28	Jewel	May 17, 2003	Stampede show	Winnipeg, Manitoba	1	54		
—	Vacated	July 10, 2003	N/A	N/A	—	—	Jewel was stripped of the championship.	
30	Stardom	September 24, 2003	Stampede show	Fort Garry, Manitoba	1	226	Defeated The Axe.	
31	Brown	May 7, 2004	Stampede show	Winnipeg, Manitoba	1	163	Defeated Rob Stardom in a steel cage match.	
32	Vain	October 15, 2004	Stampede show	Winnipeg, Manitoba	1	334	Won the title at the NWA 56th Anniversary Show.	
33	Starr	September 16, 2005	Stampede show	Port Coquitlam, BC	2	154		
34	R.A.G.E.	February 17, 2006	Stampede show	Vancouver, BC	1	124		
35	Vance Nevada	June 23, 2006	Stampede show	Surrey, BC	1	126		
36	Funk	October 27, 2006	Stampede show	Surrey, BC	1	210		
37	Bishop	May 25, 2007	Stampede show	Surrey, BC	1	308	Defeated Freddy Funk and Michelle Starr in a three-way match	
38	Scotty Mac	March 28, 2008	Stampede show	Surrey, BC	1	743		
39	Sylum	April 10, 2010	Stampede show	Surrey, BC	1	175		
40	Scotty Mac	October 2, 2010	Van-City Showdown	Vancouver, BC	2	167		
National Wrestling Alliance (NWA) and Elite Canadian Championship Wrestling (ECCW)
41	Baroni	March 18, 2011	Quest for the Gold	Surrey, BC	1	261	Unified the NWA/ECCW Heavyweight Championship with the NWA Canadian Heavyweight Championship.	
42	Spencer	December 3, 2011	One Shall Reign Supreme	Vancouver, BC	1	84	Title was deunified from the ECCW Championship on December 15, 2011.	
43	Bishop	February 25, 2012	Pacific Cup 2012 - Night 2	Vancouver, BC	2	287	Bishop won the title in the finals of the Pacific Cup.	
44	King of the Yukon	December 8, 2012	Gold Rush	Vancouver, BC	1	105		
45	Scotty Mac	March 23, 2013	We Will Riot	Port Coquitlam, BC	3	175		
46	Creed	September 14, 2013	One Shall Reign Supreme	Vancouver, BC	1	182	Creed won the title in a triple threat match which also included Kenny Lush.	
Elite Canadian Championship Wrestling (ECCW)
47	Baroni	March 15, 2014	Pacific Cup 2014	Vancouver, BC	2	217	Baroni won the title in a four way match which also included Ethan H. D. and King of the Yukon.	
48	Sylum	October 18, 2014	Halloween Hell	Vancouver, BC	2	77	Sylum won the title in a no disqualification match.	
—		January 3, 2015	N/A	N/A	—	—	Vacated after Sylum suffered a back injury.	
49	Creed	January 3, 2015	Van-City Showdown 2015	Vancouver, BC	2	14	Match also included Artemis Spencer and Kenny Lush.	
50	Spencer	January 17, 2015	Ballroom Brawl 3	Vancouver, BC	2	273		
—		October 17, 2015	N/A	N/A	—	—	Vacated after Spencer suffered a knee injury.	
51	Baroni	October 17, 2015	The Usual Suspects	Vancouver, BC	3	91	10-person battle royal which included Ethan H. D., Nicole Matthews, Daniel Adonis and Pete Powers.	
52	Spencer	January 16, 2016	Ballroom Brawl 5	Vancouver, BC	3	84	Defeated Baroni in a Unsanctioned match.	
53	Ethan H. D.	April 9, 2016	High Definition	Vancouver, BC	1	132		
54	Santiago	July 16, 2016	Ballroom Brawl 6	Vancouver, BC	1	183		
55	Andy Bird	January 14, 2017	Ballroom Brawl VII	Vancouver, BC	1	441		
56	Eddie Osbourne	March 31, 2018	22nd Anniversary	Vancouver, BC	1	287		
57	Spencer	January 12, 2019	N/A	Vancouver, BC	4	244		
58	Travis Williams	September 13, 2019	N/A	New Westminster, BC	1	N/A		
—	Deactivated	N/A N/A, 2020	—	—	—	—	The title became deactivated sometime in 2020 when the company defunct.	

== Combined reigns ==
As of February 9, 2026.

Key

†	Indicates the current champion
+	Indicates the combined reign is changing daily
¤	The exact length of at least one title reign is uncertain, so the shortest possible length is used.

Rank	Wrestler	No. of reigns	Combined days
1	Travis Williams	1	N/A
2	Scotty Mac	3	1,085
3	Angelo Mosca	5	867¤
4	Tony Baroni	3	623
5	Bishop/Cole Bishop	2	595
6	E.Z. Ryder	3	447
7	Artemis Spencer	3	686
8	Andy Bird	1	441
9	Spyder	3	411
10	Vid Vain	1	334
11	Crusher Carlsen	1	279¤
12	Dewey Robertson	1	260
13	Sid Sylum	2	252
14	Rob Stardom	1	226
15	Great Hossein Arab	2	216
16	Dino Bravo	2	211
17	"Fast" Freddy Funk	1	210
18	Nelson Creed	2	196
19	Michelle Starr	2	184
20	Mike Santiago	1	183
21	Sgt. Slaughter	1	182
22	Eddie Osbourne	1	287
23	Kerry Brown	1	163
24	Ethan H. D.	1	132
25	Vance Nevada	1	126
26	R.A.G.E.	1	124
27	Big John Studd	1	119
28	King of the Yukon	1	105
29	Zack Mercury	1	71
30	Greg Valentine	1	56
31	Brian Jewel	1	54
32	Ivan Koloff	1	42
33	Angelo Mosca Jr.	1	21¤
34	Mr. Fuji	1	14
35	Brian Sylver	1	2
36	The Machine	1	1¤

== See also ==
- List of National Wrestling Alliance championships
- NWA Canadian Heavyweight Championship (Calgary version)
- NWA Canadian Heavyweight Championship (Halifax version)
- NWA Canadian Heavyweight Championship (Vancouver version)
- NWA National Heavyweight Championship, counterpart in the United States, originally a regional championship before being acquired by the NWA Board
