= ECCW Hardcore Championship =

Details
- Promotion: Elite Canadian Championship Wrestling
- Date established: 29 November 1999
- Date retired: 2024
Statistics
- First champion: Moondog Manson
- Final champion: Drayco
- Most reigns: Moondog Manson (15)
- Longest reign: Moondog Manson (4319 days)
- Shortest reign: Moondog Manson (3 days)

The ECCW Hardcore Championship is a hardcore wrestling championship in Elite Canadian Championship Wrestling, a professional wrestling promotion in Vancouver, British Columbia. The title was first awarded 29 November 1999. The title is currently inactive and became so on 8 September 2024 when it was abandoned by the last Champion.

== History ==
The title was first awarded to Moondog Manson, following a match pitting him against Ladies Choice on 26 November 1999 in New Westminster, British Columbia. Both men earned the opportunity to compete for the title by winning two separate hardcore tournaments. Ladies Choice defeated Steve Rizzono in the final of the first tournament, which took place on 19 November 1999 in Campbell River, British Columbia, while Manson earned his spot by defeating Juggernaut in the final of the second tournament on 20 November 1999 in Port Hardy, British Columbia - a match that ran for over 45 minutes. As the winners of both tournaments, Manson and Ladies Choice became opponents and participants in the inaugural Hardcore Championship match.

== Title history ==
As of 28 June 2025.

Key
No.	Overall reign number
Reign	Reign number for the specific champion
Days	Number of days held
+	Current reign is changing daily

No.	Champion	Championship change			Reign statistics		Notes	Ref.
No.	Champion	Date	Event	Location	Reign	Days	Notes	Ref.
Extreme Canadian Championship Wrestling (ECCW), National Wrestling Alliance (NWA) and Elite Canadian Championship Wrestling (ECCW)
1	Moondog Manson	26 November 1999		New Westminster, British Columbia	1	30	Manson beats Ladies Choice to become the first champion.	
2	Ladies Choice	26 December 1999		New Westminster, British Columbia	1	103		
3	Moondog Manson	8 April 2000		Kelowna, British Columbia	2	3		
4	Leatherface	11 April 2000		Fraser Lake, British Columbia	1	6		
5	Moondog Manson	17 April 2000		Dease Lake, British Columbia	3	151		
6	Notorious T.I.D.	15 September 2000		New Westminster, British Columbia	1	14		
7	Moondog Manson	29 September 2000		New Westminster, British Columbia	4	133		
8	Juggernaut	9 February 2001		Hope, British Columbia	1	11		
9	Lumberjack Bubba	1 June 2001		Chilliwack, British Columbia	1			
—	Vacated	—		—	—	—	Title vacated when Lumberjack Bubba announces his retirement.	(Note: The exact length of Lumberjack Bubba's reign is unknown. It could have lasted up to 27 days.)
10	Billy Two Eagles	28 June 2001		Longview, Washington	1	11	Defeated Brian Bedlam to win the vacant championship.	
11	Brian Bedlam	19 October 2001		Portland, Oregon	1	28		
12	Wrathchild	16 November 2001		Surrey, British Columbia	1	57		
13	Moondog Manson	12 January 2002		Cloverdale, British Columbia	5	42		
14	Wrathchild	23 February 2002		Nanaimo, British Columbia	2	6		
15	Prince Aladdin	1 March 2002		Surrey, British Columbia	1	14		
16	Moondog Manson	15 March 2002		Surrey, British Columbia	6	14	Manson wins the title in a tag team match pitting Prince Alladdin/Manson vs. SCUM. The person who scored the winning fall would become the new champion.	
17	Father Juan	29 March 2002		Surrey, British Columbia	1	28	Wins a 3-way beating Moondog Manson and Wrathchild.	
18	Moondog Manson	26 April 2002		Surrey, British Columbia	7	84		
19	Michelle Starr	19 July 2002		Port Coquitlam, British Columbia	1	70		
20	The Count	27 September 2002		Surrey, British Columbia	1	89	Defeats Starr and Jimbo Richards as guest referee/commissioner and gives himself title.	
21	Memphis Raines	27 December 2002		Surrey, British Columbia	1	119		
22	Dropkick Murphy	25 April 2003		Surrey, British Columbia	1	119		
23	Moondog Manson	22 August 2003		Surrey, British Columbia	8	798		
24	Cremator	28 October 2005		Surrey, British Columbia	1	28		
25	Moondog Manson	25 November 2005		Surrey, British Columbia	9	463		
26	Scotty Mac	3 March 2007		Vancouver, British Columbia	1	174	Defeats Moondog Manson and Cremator in a 3-way match.	
27	Cremator	24 August 2007		Surrey, British Columbia	2	280		
28	Moondog Manson	30 May 2008		Surrey, British Columbia	10	518	Defeats Cremator and Prince Alladdin in a 3-way match.	
29	Cole Bishop	30 October 2009		Surrey, British Columbia	1	91		
30	Moondog Manson	29 January 2010		Surrey, British Columbia	11	413		
31	Ravenous Randy	18 March 2011		Surrey, British Columbia	1	99		
32	Moondog Manson	24 June 2011		Surrey, British Columbia	12	36		
—	Vacated	29 July 2011		Surrey, British Columbia	—	—	ECCW Owner Michael Sweetser discontinued the title, stating ECCW was going in a new direction without hardcore wrestling. The title was reactivated in October 2011 by NWA representative Bill Coltrane.	
33	Moondog Manson	28 October 2011		Surrey, British Columbia	13	64	Moondog Manson reclaimed the ECCW Hardcore Title after defeating 8 other men in a Fans Brings The Weapons Invitational.	
34	Scotty Mac	30 December 2011		Surrey, British Columbia	2	29		
35	Michael Sweetser	27 January 2012		Surrey, British Columbia	1	58	Scotty Mac turned the championship over to Sweetser.	
36	Moondog Manson	24 March 2012		Vancouver, British Columbia	14	4319	Moondog Manson was suspended from ECCW in 2013, but continued to defend the title on the independent wrestling scene with the approval of the 51% majority owner of ECCW	
37	BJ Laredo	20 January 2024		Nanaimo, British Columbia	1	107	BJ Laredo toppled Moondog Manson in a Barbedwire match to capture the ECCW Hardcore Title and VIPW Anarchy Title.	
38	Moondog Manson	5 May 2024		Port Moody, British Columbia	15	91	Moondog Manson defeated BJ Laredo and Josh Cadwell in a 3-way match.	
39	Drayco	4 August 2024		Port Moody, British Columbia	1	153		
—	Vacated	8 September, 2024	—	—	—	—	The title was vacated when it was abandoned by Drayco during a promo where Moondog Manson retrieved it from a trash can. A new version ECCW Hardcore Title was made by Canadian Apex Wrestling to replace this title which was retired to Moondog Manson. The new title is currently active and being defended.	

== Combined reigns ==
¤	The exact length of at least one title reign is uncertain, see note.

Rank	Champion	No. of reigns	Combined days
1	Moondog Manson	15	7159
2	Cremator	2	308
3	Scotty Mac	2	203
4	Memphis Raines	1	119
5	Drayco	1	153
6	Dropkick Murphy	1	119
7	Billy Two Eagles	1	113
8	Juggernaut	1	112
9	Ladies Choice	1	103
10	Ravenous Randy	1	99
11	Cole Bishop	1	91
12	The Count	1	89
13	Michelle Starr	1	70
14	Wrathchild	2	63
15	Michael Sweetser	1	58
16	Brian Bedlam	1	28
17	Father Juan	1	28
18	Notorious T.I.D.	1	14
19	Prince Alladdin	1	14
20	Leatherface	1	6
21	Lumberjack Bubba	1	¤

== See also ==
- Professional wrestling in Canada
- List of National Wrestling Alliance championships
