= Angelo Mosca Jr. =

American professional wrestler

Personal information
- Born: Angelo Mosca Jr. Hamilton, Ontario, Canada

Professional wrestling career
- Ring name: Angelo Mosca Jr.
- Billed from: Boston, Massachusetts
- Trained by: Angelo Mosca
- Debut: 1982
- Retired: 1988

Angelo Mosca Jr. is a Canadian-American retired professional wrestler, who wrestled for the Jim Crockett Promotions, Championship Wrestling from Florida, and the World Wrestling Federation in the early to mid-1980s. He is a second generation wrestler, being the son of his trainer and manager Angelo Mosca.

== Career ==
Mosca made his professional wrestling debut in 1982 in North Carolina for Jim Crockett Promotions after being trained by his father, Angelo. He worked in St. Louis and Kansas City in 1983. Later that year, he made his debut for Championship Wrestling from Florida where he worked for a year.

In 1984, he became a three-time NWA Mid-Atlantic Heavyweight Champion when he defeated Ivan Koloff in January and April 1984 dropping the title once to Koloff. Then in May, Mosca dropped the title to Dory Funk Jr. Mosca then defeated Funk for his third reign, He dropped the title to Ron Bass that August.

Mosca also won the NWA Canadian Heavyweight Championship defeating Ivan Koloff in Toronto for Maple Leaf Wrestling in June 1984. A month later the title was vacated when Maple Leaf Wrestling was bought by the World Wrestling Federation. This made him the last champion until the title was reincarnated in 1998.

Mosca would then work for the World Wrestling Federation making his debut in December 1984 with his father, Angelo as his manager at Toronto's Maple Leaf Gardens. Only worked for the WWF whenever they were in Toronto, Hamilton or Southern Ontario for TV tapings or house shows. He left the WWF in 1985.

In 1986, he returned to Jim Crockett Promotions where he worked in Canadian-based shows. He defeated Pez Whatley at MACW MoscaMania II in Hamilton on February 15, 1987. Then retired from wrestling in 1988.

== Personal life ==
Mosca's father Angelo died on November 6, 2021, at 84 years old.

== Championships and accomplishments ==
- Mid-Atlantic Championship Wrestling/Jim Crockett Promotions
  - NWA Mid-Atlantic Heavyweight Championship (3 times)
- Maple Leaf Wrestling
  - NWA Canadian Heavyweight Championship (Toronto version) (1 time)
