= Juggernaut (wrestler) =

Canadian professional wrestler (born 1975)

Personal information
- Born: Craig Renney; December 9, 1975 (age 50) Cranbrook, British Columbia

Professional wrestling career
- Ring name: Juggernaut
- Billed height: 6 ft 5 in (1.96 m)
- Billed weight: 400 lb (180 kg)
- Billed from: Canadian Rocky Mountains
- Trained by: Jim Hughes; Michelle Starr
- Debut: January 17, 1996

Craig Renney (born December 9, 1975) is a Canadian former professional wrestler best known by his ring name, Juggernaut. He has competed for several North American independent promotions and has competed in several wrestling tours in Asia. He also had a brief stint in World Championship Wrestling (WCW) in 2000.

Juggernaut is known both for his brawling and aerial abilities as well as his martial arts skills. He has competed against some of the most famous wrestlers in the business. His greatest success came in Extreme Canadian Championship Wrestling (ECCW), where he had a long rivalry with Kurrgan and won the NWA/ECCW Heavyweight Championship on six occasions. Juggernaut announced his retirement in 2007, as he wanted to quit wrestling while he was still healthy.

== Career ==
=== Early career ===
Renney grew up in Cranbrook, British Columbia and became interested in wrestling at age seven while watching a televised match between Bruno Sammartino and Gorilla Monsoon. He gained combat sport experience by earning black belts in both judo and jujutsu, and he moved to Edmonton, Alberta to train as a wrestler. He made his debut in Edmonton and wrestled in several matches there before moving to Tampa, Florida. Starting out, he wrestled for Independent Pro Wrestling, making $30 per match or less and sometimes competing in exchange for food and drinks. Juggernaut became known for his hardcore wrestling abilities, but he also impressed observers with his ability to perform a moonsault.

=== Independent circuit ===
The following year, he wrestled against Jimmy Snuka at the Washington State Fair in Vancouver, Washington. He continued to compete in various independent promotions, facing such veterans as Greg Valentine, Jim Neidhart, and The Bushwhackers. At an event in Montana, he worked in a booked loss to The Honky Tonk Man. Juggernaut began competing regularly with Extreme Canadian Championship Wrestling in 1999 and formed a tag team with Biohazard known as Toxic Insanity. They won the NWA/ECCW Tag Team Championship on March 26, 1999, by defeating Michelle Starr and Johnny Canuck. Two months later, they also won the NWA Canadian Tag Team Championship. They defended both belts until they dropped the Canadian Tag Team Championship on July 22. They regained the title two days later but were stripped of all of their belts that August. Juggernaut held the NWA/ECCW Tag Team Championship once more, winning the belts with Dr. Luther on March 31, 2000, but losing them the same night.

During this time, Juggernaut also competed as a singles wrestler. On September 12, 1999, he defeated Michelle Starr to win the NWA/ECCW Pacific Northwest Heavyweight Championship. The following month, he dropped the belt to Johnny Canuck in a three-way match. He regained the belt in a rematch but was stripped of the title in December. A tournament was held for the vacant championship, which Juggernaut won to regain the title. He then became involved in a feud with Kurrgan, and the two traded the belt back and forth. Kurrgan beat Juggernaut for the title on February 25, 2000, but Juggernaut won it back two months later. He held the belt for a day before dropping it back to Kurrgan. When Kurrgan was stripped of the title for being unable to compete at a show in July, Juggernaut won the vacant championship by defeating Leatherface (Rick Patterson). At Juggernaut's request, the match was a two out of three falls tables match. During the match, he was legitimately unable to move for several minutes and suffered memory loss after Leatherface hit him with a chair.

=== Wrestling overseas and return to North America ===
In 2000, Juggernaut began touring Asia as a wrestler. He competed in Korea for the World Wrestling Association. Two weeks after returning to Canada, he accepted an invitation from the International Wrestling Association of Japan (IWA Japan). While in Japan, he achieved his dream of wrestling in Tokyo's Korakuen Hall. Three months later, World Championship Wrestling was taping WCW Thunder in Kamloops, British Columbia and recruited Juggernaut and three other local wrestlers for a match. They faced KroniK in a handicap match with a two-minute time limit. KroniK won the match in one minute and forty-nine seconds, pinning Juggernaut after performing the High Times.

Returning to ECCW, Juggernaut defeated Moondog Manson on February 9, 2001, to win the ECCW Hardcore Championship. He held the title for almost four months before dropping it to Lumberjack Bubba. He began competing for several other independent promotions, including Calgary, Alberta-based Stampede Wrestling. In 2002, he defeated former Extreme Championship Wrestling World Heavyweight Champion Tommy Dreamer. In 2005, he won his sixth and final NWA/ECCW Pacific Northwest Heavyweight Championship by defeating Scotty Mac. He held the belt until January 27, 2006, when he dropped it to Sweet Daddy Devastation. Later that year, he teamed with TJ Wilson to win the Stampede Wrestling International Tag Team Championship. They did not lose the belts, but they were forced to vacate the title when Wilson left the promotion to sign with World Wrestling Entertainment. Meanwhile, he continued to wrestle overseas, competing in such countries as India, Singapore, Malaysia, and Brunei.

=== Retirement and semi-retirement ===
In 2007, Juggernaut announced his intention to retire from professional wrestling after nearly 1500 matches. Although he was healthy, he decided to retire before he suffered any injuries that would hurt him in his future life outside the ring. On his website, he posted a list of the ten wrestlers he wished to face before retiring. The list included such wrestlers as Samoa Joe, Aaron Idol, Bryan Danielson, and Steve Corino.

Juggernaut has since returned to wrestling on a limited basis. He appeared at an ECCW show in November 2009, attacking Azeem The Dream. On January 29, 2010, he competed in his first match since retirement. He wrestled a triple threat match against Sid Sylum and Scotty Mac in which Scotty Mac retained the NWA Canadian Heavyweight Championship.

== Championships and accomplishments ==
- New Pro Wrestling America
  - NPWA Heavyweight Championship (1 time)
- NWA: Extreme Canadian Championship Wrestling
  - NWA Canadian Tag Team Championship (2 times) – with Biohazard
  - NWA/ECCW Hardcore Championship (1 time)
  - NWA/ECCW Pacific Northwest Heavyweight Championship (6 times)
  - NWA/ECCW Tag Team Championship (2 times) – with Biohazard (1) and Dr. Luther (1)
- Prairie Wrestling Alliance
  - PWA Championship (1 time)
  - PWA Mayhem Championship (1 time)
  - PWA Canadian Tag Team Championship (1 time) – with Tex Gaines
- Premier Championship Wrestling
  - PCW Xtreme Championship (1 time)
- Premier Wrestling Federation
  - PWF Extreme Championship (1 time)
- Pro Wrestling Illustrated
  - Ranked No. 292 of the 500 best singles wrestlers of the PWI 500 in 2005
- Ring Around The Northwest Newsletter
  - Tag Team of the Year (1999) with Biohazzard
  - Wrestler of the Year (2000)
- Stampede Wrestling
  - Stampede International Tag Team Championship (2 times) – with "Pyro" Pete Wilson (1) and TJ Wilson (1)
- The Future of Wrestling
  - TFW Heavyweight Championship (2 times)
  - TFW Tag Team Championship (1 time) – with Adam Firestorm
- Western Canadian Extreme Wrestling
  - WCEW Extreme Tag Team Championship (1 time) – with Dr. Luther
