= Christina Von Eerie =

American professional wrestler (born 1989)

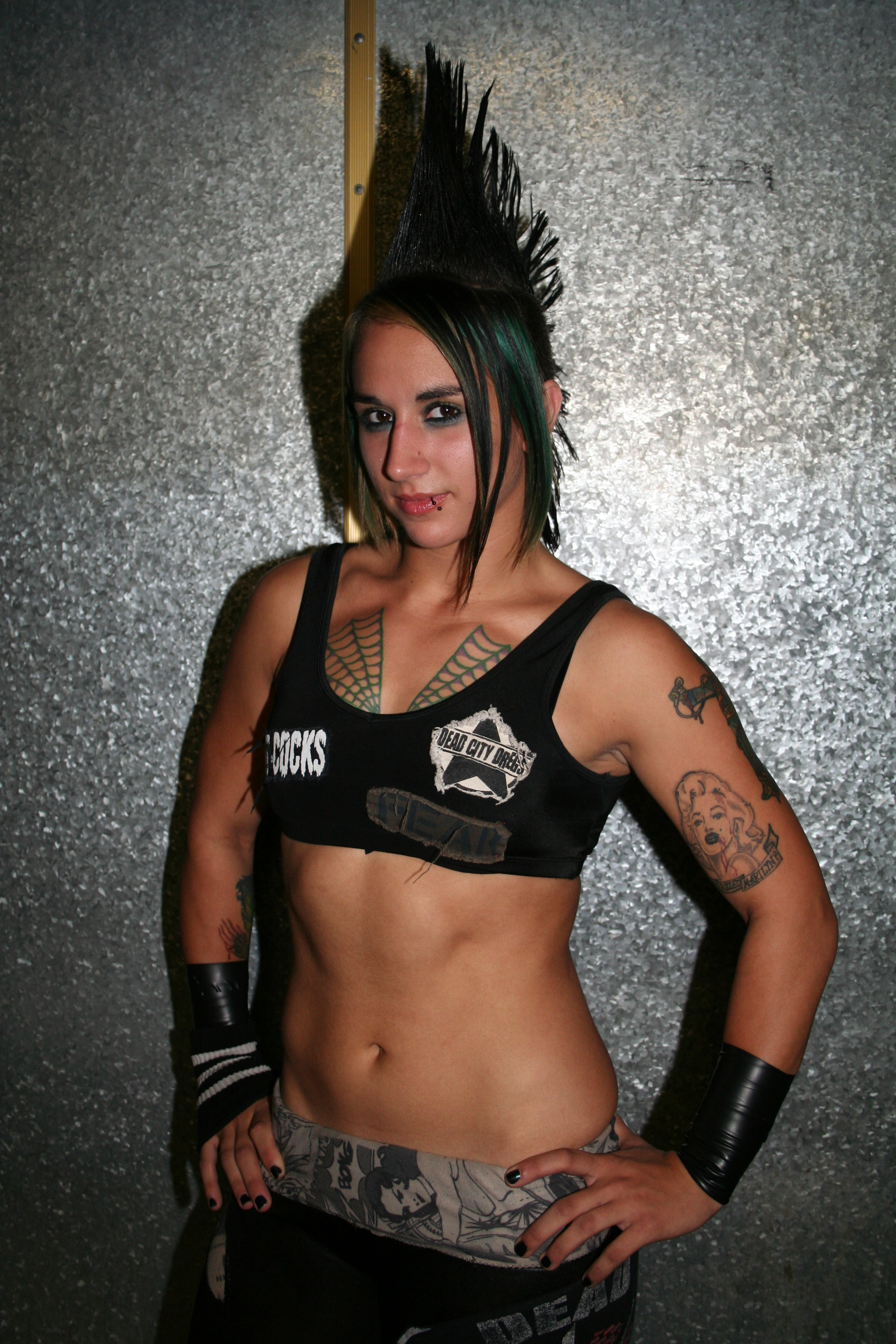
- Von Eerie in 2009

Personal information
- Born: Christina Maria Kardooni; August 28, 1989 (age 36) Sacramento, California, U.S.
- Spouse: Scotty Mac (m. 2017)

Professional wrestling career
- Ring name(s): Christina Von Eerie; Toxxin; Razor
- Billed height: 5 ft 4 in (1.63 m)
- Billed weight: 123 lb (56 kg)
- Billed from: Spook City, USA; Reno, Nevada
- Trained by: Supreme Pro Wrestling Training Academy; Bao Nguyen; The Big Ugly; Danny Secretion; Joe Applebaumer; Sir Samurai; Oliver John
- Debut: 2006

Christina Maria Kardooni (born August 28, 1989) is an American professional wrestler, known professionally as Christina Von Eerie. She has worked for various promotions, including the American Global Force Wrestling (GFW), Pro Wrestling Guerrilla (PWG), Shimmer Women Athletes and Total Nonstop Action Wrestling (TNA) / Impact Wrestling promotions as well as the Mexican AAA and the Japanese World Wonder Ring Stardom. In AAA, she held the AAA World Mixed Tag Team Championship with Alex Koslov, while in GFW she was the inaugural GFW Women's Champion.

== Professional wrestling career ==
=== Early career (2006–2009) ===
After receiving her training at the Supreme Pro Wrestling Training Academy in her hometown of Sacramento, Von Eerie made her professional wrestling debut in 2006 and started working for various professional wrestling promotions on the West Coast, most notably All Pro Wrestling (APW), Insane Wrestling League (IWL), Pro Wrestling Revolution (PWR), Xtreme Pro Wrestling (XPW) and Alternative Wrestling Show (AWS), where she held the promotion's Women's Championship on two separate occasions.

=== Pro Wrestling Guerrilla (2009–2010) ===
Von Eerie made her debut for Southern California–based Pro Wrestling Guerrilla (PWG) on September 4, 2009, at Guerre Sans Frontières, in a match, where she was defeated by Candice LeRae. She returned to the promotion on January 30, 2010, at Kurt Russellreunion, where she competed in an eight-person tag team match, where she, Ryan Taylor and the Cutler Brothers (Brandon and Dustin) defeated Candice LeRae, Jerome Robinson, Johnny Goodtime and Malachi Jackson. At the following event on February 27, Von Eerie and the Cutler Brothers were defeated in a six-person tag team match by Brandon Bonham, Candice LeRae and Joey Ryan. After working her first three matches in PWG as a heel, Von Eerie turned face for her fourth match on April 10, when she was defeated by Joey Ryan in an intergender match. Von Eerie returned to the promotion on June 11, being defeated by LeRae in a singles match for the second time in her PWG career.

=== AAA (2010) ===
On March 5, 2010, Von Eerie made her debut for Mexican professional wrestling promotion AAA, as a member of the villainous alliance La Legión Extranjera (the Foreign Legion). In her first match in the promotion, Von Eerie and her Legión stable mate Sexy Star defeated Faby and Mari Apache. On March 12, at Rey de Reyes, Von Eerie, Sexy Star and Rain were defeated by the Apaches and Cynthia Moreno in a six-woman tag team match.

After spending three months away from AAA, Von Eerie returned as a regular on June 20, replacing Rain as the third woman in La Legión Extranjera and entering into a feud with the Apache sisters, during which she regularly teamed with her stable mates Sexy Star and Jennifer Blade. On July 2 Von Eerie and her Legión stablemate Alex Koslov defeated Faby Apache and Aero Star to win the AAA World Mixed Tag Team Championship. This started a storyline, where Koslov fell in love with Von Eerie, who, however, didn't share his emotions. On July 29 Von Eerie and Blade defeated the Apaches in a lumberjack strap match. On August 14 at Verano de Escandalo Von Eerie, Koslov and Sexy Star faced the Apaches and Aero Star in a match, where both Von Eerie's and Koslov's World Mixed Tag Team Championship and Sexy Star's Reina de Reinas Championship were on the line. The match ended with Mari Apache pinning Sexy Star, which meant that she lost her title, while Von Eerie and Koslov kept theirs. At the following major event, Héroes Inmortales IV on October 1, Von Eerie and Koslov lost the World Mixed Tag Team Championship to Faby Apache and her new tag team partner Pimpinela Escarlata.

=== Independent circuit (2010–present) ===
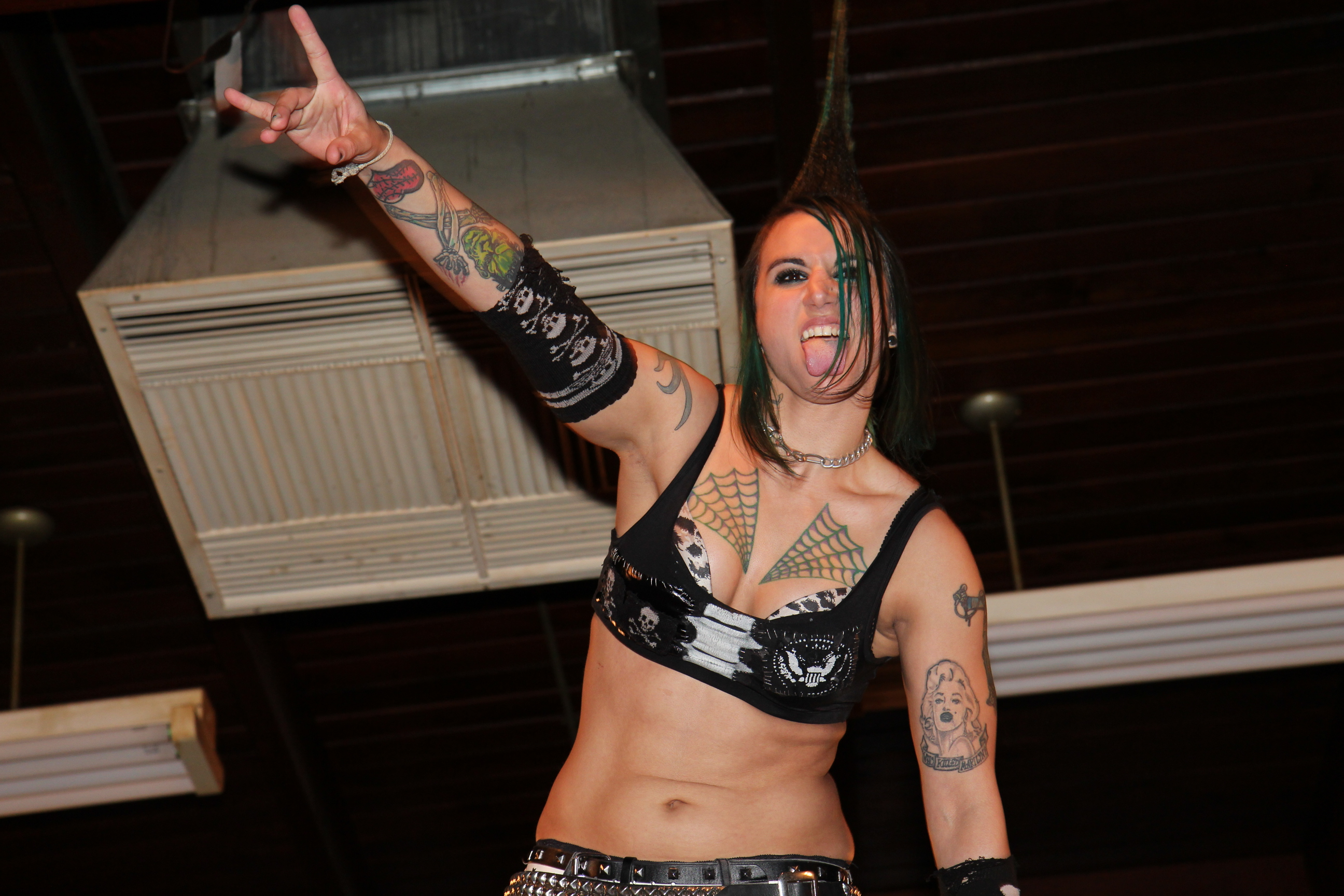
Von Errie in 2012 during a Shimmer Women Athletes show

On March 27, 2010, Von Eerie made a one–time appearance for Dragon Gate USA, accompanying Jon Moxley to the ring at the tapings of the Mercury Rising pay-per-view in Phoenix, Arizona. During Moxley's hardcore match with Tommy Dreamer, Von Eerie entered the ring and slapped Dreamer, who then proceeded to give her a piledriver. On August 25, 2010, Von Eerie took part in the first NWA Championship Wrestling from Hollywood tapings and made her debut on the fourth episode, which aired on October 22, defeating Lizzy Valentine.

On March 2, 2011, Chicago, Illinois–based all–female promotion Shimmer Women Athletes announced that Von Eerie would make her debut for the promotion at the March 26 and 27 tapings. In her Shimmer debut match on March 26 on Volume 37, Von Eerie defeated Sara Del Rey via countout. Later that same day on Volume 38, Del Rey defeated Von Eerie in a rematch. The following day on Volume 39, Von Eerie was defeated by Mercedes Martinez. Von Eerie returned to Shimmer on October 1 at Volume 41, losing to Cheerleader Melissa. The following day on Volume 44, Von Eerie teamed with Allison Danger, Leva Bates, and MsChif to defeat Bonesaw, Melanie Cruise, Mena Libra, and She Nay Nay in an eight-woman tag team match. Von Eerie returned for her third Shimmer tapings on March 17, 2012, losing to Portia Perez on Volume 45. The following day, Von Eerie formed a partnership with MsChif, with the two losing to Kana and LuFisto on Volume 47 and defeating Hailey Hatred and Kalamity on Volume 48.

On March 30, 2012, Von Eerie returned to Dragon Gate USA, when she helped BxB Hulk defeat Sami Callihan and aligned herself with his Mad Blankey stable. On July 20, Von Eerie took part in the first internet pay-per-view of the Shine Wrestling promotion, defeating Cherry Bomb. On September 8, Von Eerie made her debut for Evolve with a win over Marti Belle. In late 2012, Von Eerie began working for Combat Zone Wrestling (CZW) as the manager of Joe Gacy.

On October 27, 2012, Von Eerie returned to Shimmer, losing to Yumi Ohka on Volume 49. Later that same day on Volume 50, she picked up her biggest win in Shimmer, defeating Cherry Bomb, Kalamity and Ryo Mizunami in a four-way match. The following day on Volume 52, Von Eerie reunited with MsChif in a tag team match, where they were defeated by Kellie Skater and Tomoka Nakagawa.

On November 3, 2012, Von Eerie made her Japanese debut for the World Wonder Ring Stardom promotion, when she and Kyoko Kimura entered the Goddesses of Stardom Tag League, defeating Act Yasukawa and Saki Kashima in their opening match. On November 11, the Kimura Monster-gun representatives continued their tournament with a time limit draw against the team of Kairi Hojo and Natsumi Showzuki. On November 25, Von Eerie and Kimura were defeated in their final round-robin match by Miho Wakizawa and Nanae Takahashi and, as a result, failed to qualify for the finals of the tournament. Von Eerie returned to Stardom on June 2, 2013, teaming with Kimura in a tag team match, where they defeated Kairi Hojo and Nanae Takahashi. On June 23, Von Eerie, along with Kimura Monster-gun stablemates Hailey Hatred and Kyoko Kimura, was given an opportunity to become the new Artist of Stardom Champion, however, the three were defeated in a decision match for the vacant title by Kairi Hojo, Kaori Yoneyama and Yuhi.

Von Eerie's participation in Shimmer's October 2013 tapings was highlighted by her feud with Saraya Knight, which built to a 3 Stages of Hell match on October 20 at Volume 61, where Von Eerie was victorious over the former Shimmer Champion.

=== Total Nonstop Action Wrestling (2010–2011) ===
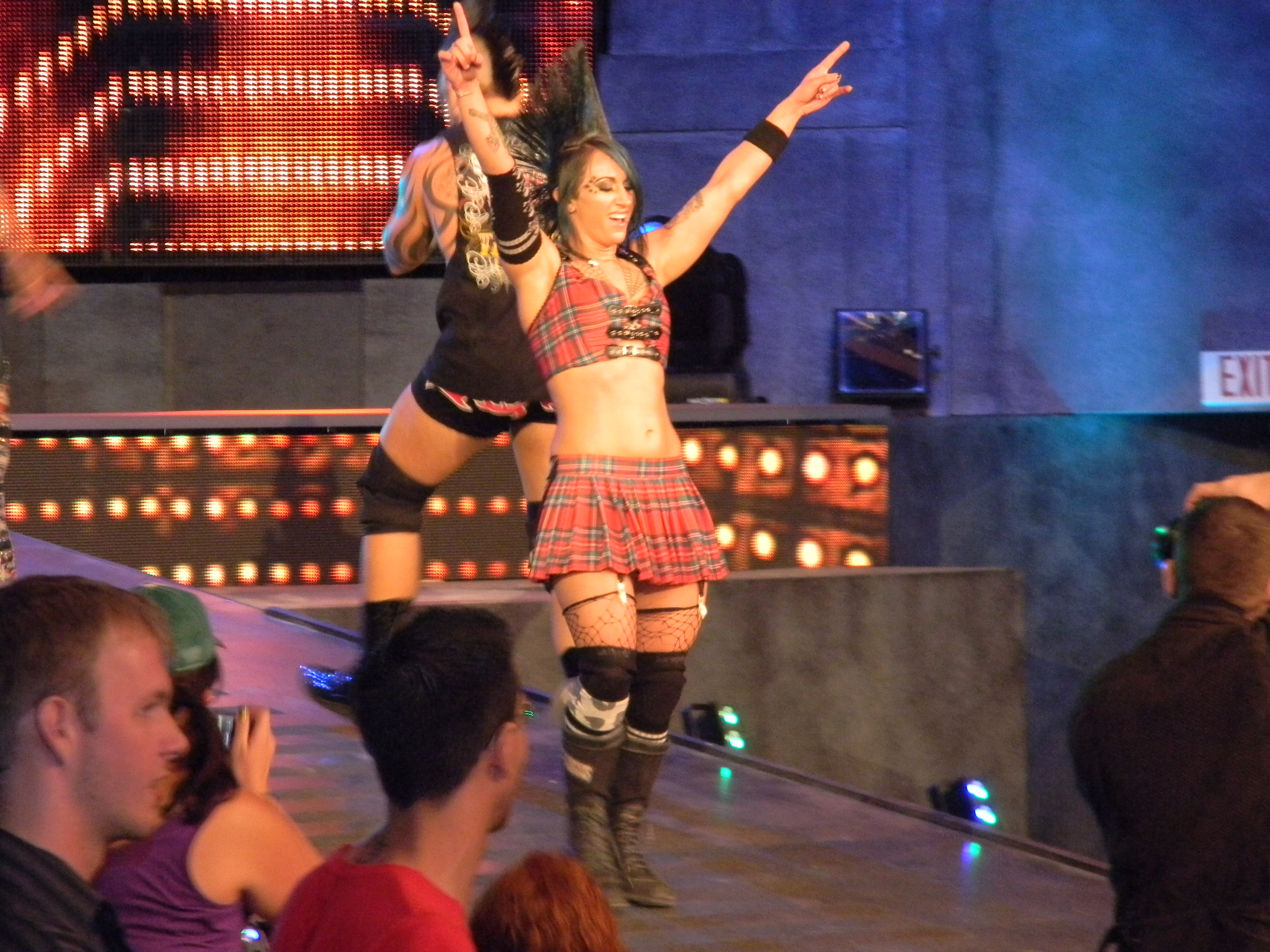
Von Eerie at a TNA Impact! taping in August 2010

Through her work in Mexico for AAA, Von Eerie was given a tryout match with Orlando, Florida–based Total Nonstop Action Wrestling (TNA), which has a working agreement with the Mexican promotion. On August 23, 2010, at the tapings of TNA Impact!, Von Eerie teamed with Shannon Moore in a dark match, where they defeated Cookie and Okada. Shortly afterwards it was reported that she had signed a contract with the promotion. Prior to her start with the promotion, Von Eerie underwent further training under Brother Devon and Brother Ray at the Team 3D Academy of Professional Wrestling and Sports Entertainment.

Kardooni made her debut on the September 22, 2011, edition of Impact Wrestling, appearing as a tattoo artist at a parlour, where Jesse Neal and Shannon Moore of the tag team Ink Inc. attacked TNA World Tag Team Champions Anarquia and Hernandez of Mexican America, back elbowing Anarquia, after being grabbed by him. On the October 13 edition of Impact Wrestling, Kardooni aligned herself with Ink Inc. by helping them clear the ring of Mexican America, when Anarquia's and Hernandez's stablemates, Rosita and Sarita, interfered in another brawl between the two teams. On October 16, during the Bound for Glory Preshow, Kardooni, now working under the new ring name Toxxin, accompanied Moore and Neal for the first time, when they unsuccessfully challenged Mexican America for the TNA World Tag Team Championship. Toxxin's first match took place on November 13 at Turning Point, where she teamed with Moore and Neal against Mexican America's Anarquia, Hernandez and Sarita in a six-person tag team match for the TNA World Tag Team Championship. Mexican America ended up retaining the title, when Sarita pinned Toxxin after hitting her with the title belt. On December 12, Jesse Neal parted ways with TNA, effectively dissolving Ink Inc. Following Neal's departure, Toxxin's profile was also removed from TNA's official website.

=== Global Force Wrestling (2015–2017) ===
On July 24, 2015, Von Eerie made her debut for Global Force Wrestling (GFW) at the promotion's first Amped television taping, defeating Lei'D Tapa and Mickie James in the first round of a tournament for the GFW Women's Championship. On October 23, Von Eerie defeated Amber Gallows in the finals to win the tournament and become the inaugural GFW Women's Champion. Throughout 2016, Von Eerie had successful title defenses against Kimber Lee and Mickie James in a three-way match, Amanda Rodriguez and Melanie Cruise. On April 20, 2017, while Von Eerie was still the GFW Women's Champion, it was announced that GFW had officially merged with Impact Wrestling, the newly renamed TNA.

=== Return to Impact Wrestling (2017) ===
Von Eerie returned to Impact Wrestling at the April 20, 2017, tapings, where she successfully defended the GFW Women's Championship against Ava Storie. The following day, she lost the title to Sienna.

== Personal life ==
Kardooni was previously in a relationship with former TNA wrestler Jesse Neal; the two were engaged in July 2011. In 2014, Kardooni was in a relationship with fellow wrestler Chris Dickinson. Kardooni married fellow professional wrestler Scotty Mac in July 2017.

Outside of professional wrestling, she was a member of two punk rock bands, in Puke and Spit she provided backing vocals and played guitar and in The Lurking Terror she played bass guitar. She left The Lurking Terror in November 2010 to focus on her professional wrestling career, while Puke and Spit broke up that same month.

Von Eerie starred in the 2023 low budget wrestling horror movie Death Rumble as Scary Mary alongside her husband and fellow wrestler, Scotty Mac.

== Championships and accomplishments ==
- AAA
  - AAA World Mixed Tag Team Championship (1 time) – with Alex Koslov
- Alternative Wrestling Show
  - AWS Women's Championship (2 times)
  - 4th Women's Tournament (2014)
- Elite Canadian Championship Wrestling
  - ECCW Tag Team Championship (1 time) – with Scotty Mac
  - ECCW Women's Championship (1 time)
- Global Force Wrestling
  - GFW Women's Championship (1 time)
  - GFW Women's Championship Tournament (2015)
- Pro Wrestling Illustrated
  - Ranked No. 29 of the top 50 female wrestlers in the PWI Female 50 in 2011
- Pro Wrestling Revolution
  - PWR World Women's Championship (1 time)
- Quintessential Pro Wrestling
  - Trouble with Angels Tournament (2014)
