= The Weirdo Hero =

- Directed by: Ryan Curtis
- Written by: Theo Francon
- Produced by: Derek Hird
- Starring: Theo Francon
- Release date: 31 August 2015
- Running time: 40 minutes
- Country: Canada
- Language: English

The Weirdo Hero is a 2015 Canadian independent theatrically released short film about a professional wrestler dealing with depression. The film uses animation together with live-action. The film stars professional wrestler Theo Francon in the lead role as "Fabulous" Frankie Myers, a play on his real life ring name "Ravenous" Randy Myers. The film was partially based on Francon's own life and experiences with depression.

== Plot ==
After winning the main championship of his promotion professional wrestler "Fabulous" Frankie Myers struggles with depression as his real life responsibilities come crashing down around him. Fighting with undiagnosed depression and treading water financially his efforts are made harder by a cartoon version of his subconscious terrorizing him with doubts of his capabilities until he finds himself on the edge of a breakdown.

== Cast ==
- Theo Francon as "Fabulous" Frankie Myers
- Hayley Gray as Gina
- Brady Roberts as Gary
- Jason Cecchini as Riley Zucchini
- Ty Olsson as Harold the Hare (voice)
- Briana Buckmaster as Security Guard Jules
- Phyllis Ramie Groves as Nurse Tammy
- Allixandra East as Sandra
- Sandy Hammond as Amy

== Production ==
The film was directed by Ryan Curtis who formerly worked on the television series Supernatural. Filming took place in Port Coquitlam. The shooting of the finale for the film done before a live audience after three warmup matches by wrestlers from the wrestling promotion ECCW. Theo Francon rehearsed scenes with director Ryan Curtis and the participating audience was credited in the film as extras.

== Release and reception ==
The film had its red carpet premiere on August 31 at the Rio Theatre in Vancouver. The film was nominated for a Leo Award in the category Best Costume Design in a Short Drama. Ryan Curtis won the Golden Lion Award in 2015 at the London Film Awards for Best First-Time Director. The film was followed by a YouTube webseries. It was selected for the 2017 Whatashort Independent International Film Festival.
