= ECCW Championship =

Professional wrestling championship

Details
- Promotion: Elite Canadian Championship Wrestling
- Date established: January 21, 1996
- Date retired: N/A N/A, 2020

Other name(s)
- ECCW Championship (1996 – 1998, 2011 – 2020); NWA/ECCW Pacific Northwest Heavyweight Championship (1998 – 2005); NWA Top Ranked Heavyweight Championship (2005 – 2006); NWA/ECCW Heavyweight Championship (2006 – 2011)
Statistics
- First champion(s): The Bodyguard
- Final champion(s): Judas Icarus
- Most reigns: Scotty Mac (6 reigns)
- Longest reign: Randy Tyler (511 days)
- Shortest reign: Mike Roselli, Sweet Daddy Devastation, and Kyle O'Reilly (<1 days)

The ECCW Championship (formerly known as the NWA/ECCW Heavyweight Championship) is the top singles championship in Elite Canadian Championship Wrestling. It was first established in 1996 in the then-independent ECCW, and its name was changed when ECCW joined the National Wrestling Alliance in 1998.

== Title history ==
Key
No.	Overall reign number
Reign	Reign number for the specific champion
Days	Number of days held
+	Current reign is changing daily

No.	Champion	Championship change			Reign statistics		Notes	Ref.
No.	Champion	Date	Event	Location	Reign	Days	Notes	Ref.
Extreme Canadian Championship Wrestling (ECCW), National Wrestling Alliance (NWA) and Elite Canadian Championship Wrestling (ECCW)
1	The Bodyguard	January 21, 1996		Campbell River, British Columbia	1	11		
—	Vacated	February 1996		—	—	—		
2	John Rambo	March 19, 1996		Port Alberni, BC	1	149	Defeated Jimmy Snuka in a tournament final.	
3	Michelle Starr	August 15, 1996		Nanaimo, British Columbia	1	221		
4	Torch	April 24, 1997	ECCW	Nanaimo, British Columbia	1	32	Wins title in a battle royal.	
5	Michelle Starr	May 26, 1997	ECCW	Duncan, BC	2	82		
6	Mike Roselli	August 16, 1997	ECCW	Nanaimo, British Columbia	1	4		
7	Randy Tyler	August 20, 1997	ECCW	Nanaimo, British Columbia	1	282		
8	Mr. Gillis	May 29, 1998	ECCW	New Westminster, BC	1	154		
9	Ladies' Choice	October 30, 1998	ECCW	New Westminster, BC	1	14	Wins title in a battle royal.	
10	Randy Tyler	November 13, 1998	ECCW	New Westminster, BC	2	77		
11	Mike Roselli	January 29, 1999	ECCW	New Westminster, BC	2	91		
—	Vacated	April 30, 1999		—	—	—	Roselli no-shows a scheduled title defense.	
12	Michelle Starr	April 30, 1999	ECCW Heavyweight Title Tournament	New Westminster, BC	3	133	Defeated Rage Man in tournament final.	
13	Juggernaut	September 10, 1999	ECCW	New Westminster, BC	1	35		
14	Johnny Canuck	October 15, 1999	ECCW	New Westminster, BC	1	12	Defeats Juggernaut and Leviathan in a Three Way match.	
15	Juggernaut	October 27, 1999	ECCW	Nanaimo, British Columbia	2	38		
—	Vacated	December 4, 1999		—	—	—	Juggernaut was stripped of the title.	
16	Juggernaut	December 11, 1999	ECCW Heavyweight Title Tournament	New Westminster, BC	3	83	Defeated Mr. Gillis in tournament final.	
17	Kurrgan	February 25, 2000	ECCW	New Westminster, BC	1	61		
18	Juggernaut	April 26, 2000	ECCW	New Westminster, BC	4	1		
19	Kurrgan	April 27, 2000	ECCW	New Westminster, BC	2	86		
—	Vacated	July 22, 2000		—	—	—	Kurrgan was stripped of the title.	
20	Juggernaut	July 22, 2000	ECCW	Surrey, BC	5	124	Defeats Leatherface to win the vacant title.	
21	Dr. Luther	November 23, 2000	ECCW	Nanaimo, BC	1	373		
22	Chance Beckett	December 1, 2001	ECCW	Vancouver, WA	1	76		
—	Vacated	February 15, 2002		—	—	—	Beckett vacates title due to personal reasons.	
23	Black Dragon	February 15, 2002	ECCW	Surrey, BC	1	105	Defeated Adam Firestorm to win the vacant title.	
24	Scotty Mac	May 31, 2002	ECCW	Surrey, BC	1	105		
25	Ladies' Choice	September 13, 2002		Surrey, BC	2	203		
26	Scotty Mac	April 4, 2003	ECCW	Surrey, BC	2	175		
27	Vance Nevada	September 26, 2003	ECCW	Surrey, BC	1	393	This was a Steel Cage match.	
28	Mike Roselli	October 23, 2004	Halloween Hell 2004	Vancouver, BC	3	1		
—	Vacated	October 23, 2004		Vancouver, BC	—	—	Vacated when Roselli, within minutes of winning the title, tries to sell the belt to Brian Sommers.	
29	Ladies' Choice	November 20, 2004	ECCW	Vancouver, BC	3	70	Defeated Juggernaut in an 8-man tournament final.	
30	Scotty Mac	January 29, 2005	ECCW	Vancouver, BC	3	48	Mac defeated Juggernaut and previous champion Ladies Choice, Abbadon, Disco Fury, Mike Roselli, Seth Knight and Vid Vain in an Eight Man Extreme Rules Battle Royal match.	
31	Juggernaut	March 18, 2005	ECCW	Surrey, BC	6	315		
32	Sweet Daddy Devastation	January 27, 2006	ECCW	Vancouver, BC	1	<1		
33	Randy Tyler	January 27, 2006		Vancouver, BC	3	511	Aaron Idol defeats SDD for the title on March 11, 2006; however, Tyler presents a contract, signed unknowingly by SDD prior to winning the title on January 27, 2006, which states that if SDD won the title, Tyler would be the rightful champion.	
34	Aaron Idol	June 22, 2007	ECCW	Surrey, BC	1	189	This was a Steel Cage match.	
35	Scotty Mac	December 28, 2007		Surrey, BC	4	301	Awarded title by forfeit when Idol is not medically cleared to wrestle due to shoulder injury.	
36	Memphis	October 24, 2008	Halloween Hell 2008	Surrey, BC	1	35	This was a Five Way, Steel Cage Submission match only featuring El Phantasmo, Kyle O'Reilly and Rick the Weapon X.	
37	Scotty Mac	November 28, 2008	ECCW	Surrey, BC	5	63	This was an I Quit match.	
38	Memphis	January 30, 2009	ECCW	Surrey, BC	2	246	This was a Texas Death match.	
39	Billy Suede	October 3, 2009	ECCW	Vancouver, BC	1	167		
40	Sid Sylum	March 19, 2010	Quest For Gold	Surrey, BC	1	249	This was a Triple Threat match.	
—	Vacated	November 23, 2010			—	—	Title is declared vacant after Sylum suffers a hip injury at Halloween Hell.	
41	Bishop	December 26, 2010	Seasons Beatings	Surrey, BC	1	69	Defeated Tony Baroni in tournament finals for vacant title at Seasons Beatings.	
42	Tony Baroni	March 5, 2011	TLC	Vancouver, BC	1	13	This was a Tables, Ladders, and Chairs match.	
—	Vacated	March 18, 2011		—	—	—		
43	Pete Powers	January 27, 2012	Clash Of The Titans	Surrey, BC	1	79	Defeats El Phantasmo in a Ladder match in the final of a tournament to crown a new champion.	
—	Vacated	April 15, 2012		—	—	—	Powers is stripped of the title, as he is unable to defend the championship in a timely fashion due to his ongoing tour of Mexico.	
44	Sid Sylum	April 27, 2012	Quest For Gold	Surrey, BC	2	78	Sylum defeats Ethan H. D. in the final of a tournament to crown a new champion.	
45	J-Sin Sullivan	July 14, 2012	Last Man Standing	Vancouver, BC	1	105	This was a Last Man Standing match.	
46	Sid Sylum	October 27, 2012	Halloween Hell 2012	New Westminster, BC	3	84	This was a Three Stages of Hell match.	
47	Cremator Von Slasher	January 19, 2013	Wild Wild New West	New Westminster, BC	1	90	This was a New West Street Fight match which also involves Bishop, Moondog Manson.	
48	Moondog Manson	April 19, 2013	Redemption	Surrey, BC	1	1	This was a Hardcore match.	
49	MR2	April 20, 2013	Vendetta	Port Coquitlam, BC	1	<1	This was a Three Way match which involves Cremator Von Slasher.	
—	Vacated	April 20, 2013		Port Coquitlam, BC	—	—	MR2 was stripped of the title due to paying off the referee on the same day he won the title.	
50	El Phantasmo	July 6, 2013	TLC VIII	Vancouver, BC	1	196	This was a Four Way Tables, Ladders, and Chairs match for the vacant Championship which involves Ravenous Randy, Sid Sylum and Tony Baroni	
51	Ravenous Randy	January 18, 2014	Ballroom Brawl	Vancouver, BC	1	154		
52	Bishop	June 21, 2014	Clash Of The Titans 2014	Vancouver, BC	2	63		
53	Nicole Matthews	August 23, 2014	All Or Nothing	Vancouver, BC	1	42		
54	Bishop	October 4, 2014	SINFUL	Vancouver, BC	3	105		
55	Nicole Matthews	January 17, 2015	Ballroom Brawl III	Vancouver, BC	2	175	This was a Tapout Or Knockout match.	
56	Artemis Spencer	July 11, 2015	Ballroom Brawl IV	Vancouver, BC	1	35	Defeated Matthews, Ethan H. D. and Billy Suede in a Ladder match. Also, Spencer's NWA Canadian Heavyweight Championship was on the line.	
57	Scotty Mac	August 15, 2015	No Holds Barred	Vancouver, BC	6	154		
58	El Phantasmo	January 16, 2016	Ballroom Brawl V	Vancouver, BC	2	364	Defeated Scotty in a Steel Cage match.	
59	Kyle O'Reilly	January 14, 2017	Ballroom Brawl VII	Vancouver, BC	1	49	Defeated El Phantasmo after ELP made an open challenge to any TV wrestler.	
—	Vacated	March 4, 2017		Vancouver, BC	—	—	O'Reilly vacated the title to ensure ECCW would have a fighting champion while he figured out his future.	
60	Nicole Matthews	March 4, 2017	Pacific Cup 2017	Vancouver, BC	3	189	Defeated El Phantasmo and Tony Baroni in the finals of the Pacific Cup to win the vacant title.	
62	Air Adonis	September 9, 2017	DEFY Vs. ECCW	Vancouver, BC	1	133	This was a Four Way match which also involves Scotty Mac and Shreddz.	
62	El Phantasmo	January 20, 2018	Ballroom Brawl IX	Vancouver, BC	3	356	This was a Three Way match which also involves Ethan H. D.	
63	Artemis Spencer	January 11, 2019	Ballroom Brawl E11even	Vancouver, BC	2	371		
64	Bandido	January 17, 2020	Ballroom Brawl XIII - Night One	Vancouver, BC	1	1		
63	Judas Icaris	January 18, 2020	Ballroom Brawl XIII - Night Two	Vancouver, BC	1	N/A	This was a Four Way match which involved Jeff Cobb and Beef Boy.	
—	Deactivated	N/A N/A, 2020	—	—	—	—	The title became deactivated sometime in 2020 when the company defunct.	

== Combined reigns ==
As of March 19, 2025.

†	Indicates the current champion
<1	Indicates reign was less than a day

Rank	Champion	No. of reigns	Combined days
1	El Phantasmo	3	916
2	Randy Tyler	3	870
3	Scotty Mac	6	846
4	Judas Icarus	1	N/A
5	Juggernaut	5	596
6	Michelle Starr	3	436
7	Sid Sylum	3	411
8	Artemis Spencer	2	406
8	Nicole Matthews	3	406
10	Vance Nevada	1	393
11	Dr. Luther	1	373
12	Ladies Choice	3	287
13	Memphis	2	281
14	Bishop	3	237
15	Aaron Idol	1	189
16	Billy Suede	1	167
17	Mr. Gillis	1	154
18	Ravenous Randy	1	154
19	John Rambo	1	149
20	Kurrgan	2	147
21	Air Adonis	1	133
21	Black Dragon	1	105
21	J-Sin Sullivan	1	105
22	Mike Roselli	3	96
23	Cremator Von Slasher	1	90
24	Pete Powers	1	79
24	Kyle O'Reilly	1	49
26	Torch	1	32
27	Tony Baroni	1	13
28	Johnny Canuck	1	12
29	The Bodyguard	1	11
30	Moondog Manson	1	1
30	Bandido	1	1
31	Sweet Daddy Devastation	1	<1
31	MR2	1	<1

== See also ==
- Elite Canadian Championship Wrestling
- National Wrestling Alliance
