= Scotty Mac =

Canadian professional wrestler

Personal information
- Born: Scott Schnurr; November 10, 1978 (age 47) Kelowna, British Columbia, Canada
- Spouse: Christina Von Eerie (m. 2017)

Professional wrestling career
- Ring name: Scotty Mac
- Billed height: 5 ft 8 in (1.73 m)
- Billed weight: 191 lb (87 kg) or 201 lb (91 kg)
- Billed from: Kelowna, British Columbia
- Trained by: House of Pain; Chance Beckett; Michelle Starr; Steve Gillespie; Can-Am Wrestling
- Debut: December 26, 2000

Scott Schnurr (born November 10, 1978), best known by his ring name Scotty Mac, is a Canadian professional wrestler. He is best known for working for Extreme Canadian Championship Wrestling/Elite Canadian Championship Wrestling, as well as several independent promotions in Canada and the United States.

Scotty Mac is one of ECCW's most decorated wrestlers, having won multiple titles on many occasions. He is currently an owner of ECCW.

== Professional wrestling career ==
=== Training (1999–2000) ===
Scotty Mac started training in professional wrestling in 1999 when he trained with Steve Gillespie in Can-Am Wrestling which is based in Alberta. Scotty did not wrestle while training in Can-Am. He would move on to Extreme Canadian Championship Wrestling's House of Pain where he trained under the tutelage of Chance Beckett and Michelle Starr.

=== Extreme Canadian Championship Wrestling (2000–2020) ===
Scotty debuted in professional wrestling for NWA: Extreme Canadian Championship Wrestling on December 26, 2000 against Chance Beckett. Not only was Beckett his trainer, but Scotty's cast for a broken wrist was removed just two days prior to the match. Less than two years after his debut, a three-month feud with Black Dragon culminated with Scotty winning the ECCW Heavyweight Championship in a steel cage match. Scotty Mac is now part owner of ECCW

==== Pacific Cup (2003, 2007) ====
Scotty won the 2003 Pacific Cup tournament, winning matches against Beckett, Tony Kozina, and Black Dragon before defeating Bryan Danielson in the finals. Scotty returned to the finals in 2007, but lost the three-way match to Kyle O'Reilly. Kozina was the third participant.

=== Portland Wrestling (2004–2005) ===
Scotty made appearances for Portland Wrestling between 2004–2005. His appearances include defeating Moondog Moretti in a chain match, and winning the tag titles with Aaron Idol as the team of New Attitude.

=== World Wrestling Entertainment (2005–2007) ===
In 2005, after only four years in wrestling, Scotty got a three-day tryout with World Wrestling Entertainment. A contract was not signed as a result. In 2006 Scotty was on ECW and defeated Kurt Angle In 2007 he was released from the temporary contract

=== All Star Wrestling (2007) ===
Scotty Mac wrestled for ASW on September 15, 2007 in Comox, British Columbia in a "No Holds Barred match" handicapped match alongside Ice and Antwong, losing to the team of The Cremator and Sgt. Kaos.

== Other media ==
After a year of being followed by cameras in 2009, Scotty was one of the main stars of the acclaimed documentary This Wrestling Life, which follows him and trainees K. C. Spinelli, Travis Sparx, and Bill Taylor through their beginnings in the wrestling business. The film also shows Scotty's dreams to wrestle at the highest levels. Scotty starred in the 2023 low budget wrestling horror movie Death Rumble as Billy 'The King' Logan alongside his wife and fellow wrestler, Christina Von Eerie.

== Personal life ==
Mac married fellow professional wrestler Christina Von Eerie in July 2017.

== Championships and accomplishments ==
- Extreme Canadian Championship Wrestling
  - ECCW Hardcore Championship (2 time)
  - The Michael Sweetser Excellence Award
  - NWA Canadian Heavyweight Championship (2 times)
  - NWA/ECCW Heavyweight Championship (5 times)
  - ECCW Pacific Cup Tournament (2003)
  - NWA Pacific Northwest Junior Heavyweight Championship (2 times)
  - ECCW Tag Team Championship (8 times) – with Havoc (1), DK Roc (2), Dropkick Murphy (2), Michael Sweetser (1), Jamie Diaz (1), Christina Von Eerie (1)
- Prairie Wrestling Alliance
  - PWA Heavyweight Championship (1 time)
- Portland Wrestling
  - PW Heavyweight Championship (1 time)
  - PW Tag Team Championship (1 time) – with Aaron Idol
- Pro Wrestling Illustrated
  - PWI ranked him #289 of the 500 best singles wrestlers of the year in the PWI 500 in 2005
- Vancouver Island Pro Wrestling
  - Island Rumble (2022)
- Other Championships
  - BCW Heavyweight Championship (1 time)
