= NWA Canadian Junior Heavyweight Championship =

Canadian wrestling championship

Details
- Promotion: National Wrestling Alliance; Elite Canadian Championship Wrestling
- Date established: December 6, 1998
- Date retired: December 26, 2011
Statistics
- First champion(s): Hysteria
- Most reigns: Disco Fury (six reigns)
- Longest reign: Major Hardway (490 days)
- Shortest reign: Torch; Kyle O'Reilly

The NWA Canadian Junior Heavyweight Championship was the National Wrestling Alliance Board-controlled version of the Canadian Junior Heavyweight title. Previous non-NWA versions of the title also existed in Alberta, Ontario and Manitoba. The title has existed since 1998.

The NWA Canadian Light Heavyweight Championship was a title that existed before the NWA Canadian Junior Heavyweight Championship. The NWA Canadian Light Heavyweight Championship was vacated upon the inception of the NWA Canadian Junior Heavyweight Championship.

Being a professional wrestling championship, it is not won via direct competition; it is instead won via a predetermined ending to a match or awarded to a wrestler because of a wrestling angle. There have been 37 reigns by 24 wrestlers with five vacancies. One of the vacancies came when Tony Kozina vacated the title upon winning the NWA World Junior Heavyweight Championship. The title is currently inactive after being deactivated by Elite Canadian Championship Wrestling, an NWA member, in December 2011.

== Title history ==
Key
No.	Overall reign number
Reign	Reign number for the specific champion
Days	Number of days held

No.	Champion	Championship change			Reign statistics		Notes	Ref.
No.	Champion	Date	Event	Location	Reign	Days	Notes	Ref.
1	Hysteria	December 6, 1998	N/A	Winnipeg, Manitoba	1	45	Defeated Alex Rain in a tournament final to become the inaugural champion.	
2	Robby Royce	January 20, 1999	CWF	Winnipeg, Manitoba	1	157	This was a three-way match which also involves Vance Nevada.	
3	Tony Kozina	June 26, 1999	CWF	Winnipeg, Manitoba	1	139	This was a three-way match which also involves Tony McGuire.	
4	Buddy Rose Jr.	November 12, 1999	ECCW	New Westminster, British Columbia	1	16		
5	Tony Kozina	November 28, 1999	ECCW	Victoria, British Columbia	2	47		
—	Vacated	January 14, 2000	—	—	—	—	Title vacated after Kozina wins the NWA World Junior Heavyweight Championship, defeating Vince Kaplack on January 14, 2000 in North Versailles, Pennsylvania.	
6	Disco Fury	February 26, 2000	N/A	Nanaimo, British Columbia	1	90	Defeated Black Dragon in a tournament final to win the vacant title.	
7	Torch	May 26, 2000	Canadian Junior Heavyweight Title Tournament	New Westminster, British Columbia	1	35	This was a three-way match which involves Chance Beckett and Disco Fury.	
8	Chance Beckett	June 30, 2000	ECCW	New Westminster, British Columbia	1	77	This was a three-way match which also involves Todd Kelly.	
9	Torch	September 15, 2000	ECCW	New Westminster, British Columbia	2	<1	This was a Ladder match.	
10	Disco Fury	September 15, 2000	ECCW	New Westminster, British Columbia	2	34		
11	The Count	October 20, 2000	ECCW	Kamloops, British Columbia	1	2		
12	Disco Fury	October 22, 2000	ECCW	Penticton, British Columbia	3	96		
13	Chance Beckett	January 26, 2001	ECCW	Surrey, British Columbia	3	259	This was a three-way match which also involves Tony Kozina.	
14	Bryan Danielson	October 12, 2001	ECCW	Surrey, British Columbia	1	75		
15	Disco Fury	December 26, 2001	ECCW	Surrey, British Columbia	4	205		
16	Asian Coogar	July 19, 2002	ECCW	Port Coquitlam, British Columbia	1	7		
17	Disco Fury	July 26, 2002	ECCW	Surrey, British Columbia	5	126		
18	Major Hardway	November 29, 2002	ECCW	Surrey, British Columbia	1	490		
19	Tony Kozina	April 2, 2004	ECCW	Surrey, British Columbia	3	204		
20	Disco Fury	October 23, 2004	Halloween Hell	Vancouver, British Columbia	6	160		
21	Dropkick Murphy	April 1, 2005	April Anarchy	Port Coquitlam, British Columbia	1	203		
22	Aaron Idol	October 21, 2005	ECCW	Port Coquitlam, British Columbia	1	13	This was a winner takes all match, in which Idol defended the NWA ECCW Pacific Northwest Junior Heavyweight Championship.	
—	Vacated	November 3, 2005	—	—	—	—	Idol vacated the title in order to concentrate on winning the NWA/ECCW Heavyweight Championship	
23	Memphis Raines	June 23, 2006	ECCW	Surrey, British Columbia	1	98	Defeated Kyle O'Reilly in a tournament final for the vacant title.	
24	MR2	September 29, 2006	ECCW	Surrey, British Columbia	1	57	This was a triple threat match which also involves Ice.	
25	Ice	November 26, 2006	ECCW	Nanaimo, British Columbia	1	238	This was a three-way ladder match which also involves Memphis Raines.	
26	Kyle O'Reilly	July 21, 2007	ECCW	Vancouver, British Columbia	1	6		
27	Ice	July 27, 2007	ECCW	Surrey, British Columbia	2	22		
28	Kyle O'Reilly	August 18, 2007	ECCW	Nanaimo, British Columbia	2	<1		
29	Ice	August 18, 2007	ECCW	North Vancouver, British Columbia	3	6		
—	Vacated	August 28, 2007	—	—	—	—	Title held up following an inconclusive ending to a match against Kyle O'Reilly; vacancy to be filled in best-of-five series between Ice and O'Reilly	
30	Kyle O'Reilly	December 28, 2007	ECCW	Surrey, British Columbia	3	190	Defeated Ice in a best of five series final.	
31	Billy Suede	July 5, 2008	ECCW	Vancouver, British Columbia	1	217		
32	Artemis Spencer	February 7, 2009	ECCW	Vancouver, British Columbia	1	139		
—	Vacated	September 26, 2009	—	—	—	—	Artemis Spencer vacated the title after he suffered a severe knee injury at the ECCW Pacific Cup.	
33	Azeem The Dream	July 4, 2009	ECCW	Vancouver, British Columbia	1	167	Defeated Jamie Diaz, Harv Sihra and Billy Suede in a four man gauntlet match for the vacant title.	
34	Gurv Sihra	December 18, 2009	ECCW	Surrey, British Columbia	1	161		
35	Azeem The Dream	May 28, 2010	All Or Nothing	Surrey, British Columbia	2	43	This was also for Pacific Cup Spot.	
36	Rick the Weapon X	July 10, 2010	The Showcase	Vancouver, British Columbia	1	195		
37	Artemis Spencer	January 21, 2011	Clash Of The Titans	Surrey, British Columbia	2	232		
38	Alex Plexis	September 10, 2011	Van-City Showdown	Vancouver, British Columbia	1	48	This was a four way match.	
39	Nick Price	October 28, 2011	Halloween Hell	Surrey, British Columbia	1	59		
—		August 28, 2007	—	—			Title was deactivated, with Nick Price recognized as the final champion.	

== Combined reigns ==
Rank	Wrestler	No. of reigns	Combined days
1.	Disco Fury	6	711
2.	Major Hardway	1	490
3.	Tony Kozina	3	390
4.	Artemis Spencer	2	372
5.	Chance Beckett	2	336
6.	Ice	3	266
7.	Billy Suede	1	217
8.	Azeem the Dream	2	210
9.	Dropkick Murphy	1	203
10.	Kyle O'Reilly	3	197
11.	Rick "The Weapon" X	1	197
12.	Gurv Sihra	1	161
13.	Robby Royce	1	147
14.	Aaron Idol	1	141
15.	Memphis Raines	1	98
16.	Bryan Danielson	1	75
17.	Nick Price	1	64
18.	MR2	1	57
19.	Hysteria	1	55
20.	Alex Plexis	1	49
21.	Torch	2	36
22.	Buddy Rose Jr.	1	16
23.	Asian Coogar	1	7
24.	The Count	1	3

== See also ==
- List of National Wrestling Alliance championships
