= Aaron Idol =

Canadian professional wrestler (born 1980)

Personal information
- Born: July 4, 1980 (age 46) Burnaby, British Columbia, Canada

Professional wrestling career
- Ring name: Aaron Idol
- Billed height: 6 ft 0 in (183 cm)
- Billed weight: 201 lb (91 kg)
- Trained by: House of Pain; Chance Beckett
- Debut: March 18, 2001

Aaron Idol (born July 4, 1980) is a Canadian professional wrestler who is best known for his work in Extreme Canadian Championship Wrestling, where he rose to become the ECCW Heavyweight Champion.

== Career ==
=== Training ===
Idol trained at the ECCW training facility House of Pain by current ECCW roster mate and star Chance Beckett. He then made his debut on March 18, 2001, against Gorilla Magilla.

=== 2005 Pacific Cup ===
Idol competed in the 2005 Pacific Cup. He defeated Memphis Raines in the first round of the tournament. He went on to defeat J. J. Perez in the semi-finals. Idol emerged victorious in the finals on day two of the 2005 Pacific Cup, which was held on April 23, 2005. He defeated Puma and "The American Dragon" Bryan Danielson in a triple threat match that lasted 30 minutes. After the match, Danielson proceeded to smash the Pacific Cup and claimed that ECCW was inferior to New Japan Pro-Wrestling. Puma and Danielson proceeded to beat down Idol. ECCW promoter Dave Republic then issued a challenge and gave Antonio Inoki 30 days to respond. Inoki did not respond and the challenge was dropped as a result.

=== NWA Pacific Northwest Junior Heavyweight Championship ===
Winning the 2005 Pacific Cup took his career to next level. On June 24, 2005, Idol challenged for the NWA Pacific Northwest Junior Heavyweight Championship. He defeated Memphis Raines and former trainer Chance Beckett in a Triple Threat Match to become the new champion.

=== NWA Canadian Junior Heavyweight Championship ===
He challenged Scotty Mac for the NWA Canadian Junior Heavyweight Championship on October 21, 2005. He defeated then champion Scotty Mac in Port Coquitlam, British Columbia. On March 11, 2006 Idol vacated the title to concentrate on the ECCW Heavyweight Championship.

=== ECCW Heavyweight Championship ===
Idol challenged for the ECCW Heavyweight Champion on many occasions, but was unsuccessful. He then got the win he was looking for; he defeated Randy Tyler in a Steel Cage Match on June 22, 2007 in Surrey, British Columbia. Idol forfeited the ECCW Heavyweight Championship to Scotty Mac on December 28, 2007, due to a shoulder injury.

== Championships and accomplishments ==
- Extreme Canadian Championship Wrestling
  - ECCW Heavyweight Championship (1 time)
  - ECCW Pacific Cup (2005)
  - NWA Canadian Junior Heavyweight Championship (1 time)
  - NWA Pacific Northwest Junior Heavyweight Championship (1 time)
- Portland Wrestling
  - PW Tag Team Championship (1 time) - with Scotty Mac
- Pro Wrestling Illustrated
  - PWI ranked him #356 of the 500 best singles wrestlers of the year in the PWI 500 in 2005
- Top Ranked Wrestling
  - TRW Cruiserweight Championship (1 time)
