= Tony Kozina =

American professional wrestler (born 1970)

Personal information
- Born: October 23, 1970 (age 55) Portland, Oregon, U.S.

Professional wrestling career
- Ring name(s): The Canadian Cougar; Tony Kozina
- Billed height: 5 ft 6 in (168 cm)
- Billed weight: 174 lb (79 kg)
- Billed from: Portland, Oregon
- Trained by: Billy Jack Haynes; Matt Osborne; North American Wrestling Asylum; Michelle Starr
- Debut: January 26, 1997

Tony Kozina (born October 23, 1970) is an American professional wrestler who is best known for his work in the Pacific Northwest especially in Extreme Canadian Championship Wrestling and National Wrestling Alliance. He has also made previous appearances in Ring of Honor (ROH), Pro Wrestling Guerrilla (PWG), Full Impact Pro (FIP), IWA-Mid South, World Wrestling Entertainment and Total Nonstop Action Wrestling (TNA).

== Professional wrestling career ==
=== Training ===
In the summer of 1996, Kozina started training with Billy Jack Haynes and "Maniac" Matt Borne and helped train others at North American Wrestling Asylum.

=== Independent wrestling (1997–present) ===
On October 20, 1998, Kozina defeated Torch for the newly created NWA Pacific Northwest Junior Heavyweight Championship. On July 21, 2001, Kozina defeated Scotty Mac to claim his sixth NWA Pacific Northwest Junior Heavyweight Championship. The title was vacated on April 5, 2002, due to inactivity. On January 14, 2000, Kozina won his first NWA World Junior Heavyweight Championship by defeating Vince Kaplack. In a rematch at the NWA 52nd Anniversary Show on October 20, Kaplack defeated Kozina to become the NWA World Junior Heavyweight Champion.

In 2012, Kozina attracted criticism when he legitimately beat and choked out 16-year-old Ryan Kidd during the course of a match they had in Iowa.

==== Canadian Wrestling's Elite (2015–present) ====
On May 5, 2017; at Canadian Wrestling's Elite 8th Anniversary Show in Winnipeg, Manitoba; Kozina defeated Mentallo to become the new Canadian Unified Junior Heavyweight Champion. This marks the first time in nearly 10 years that the title has been active. Following the match, Kozina called out Billy Corgan and the National Wrestling Alliance. He stated he wants a shot at the NWA World Junior Heavyweight Championship.

On the January 1, 2018, Canadian Wrestling's Elite stopped in St. Albert, Alberta with the "Pick Your Poison Tour." "The Original" Marky defeated Kozina to become the new Canadian Unified Junior Heavyweight Championship. On January 3, 2018; the CWE "Pick Your Poison Tour" made a stop in Calgary, Alberta. Kozina won the Canadian Unified Junior Heavyweight Championship for the second time in a Six Man Scramble which included "The Original" Marky, Chayse Britton, Strife, Darren Burns, and "The Prodigy" Matt Hart.

=== WWE ===
On August 10, 2003, Kozina teamed up with Buddy Wayne on an episode of WWE Heat. They lost to the team of Mark Jindrak and Garrison Cade.

=== Ring of Honor ===
In January 2011, Kozina faced Davey Richards in Ring of Honor in Philadelphia, Pennsylvania. Richards won via knockout when the referee stopped the bout in just under 5 minutes.

=== Total Nonstop Action Wrestling ===
On February 16, 2015 (which aired on September 4, 2015) Kozina faced Davey Richards in Total Nonstop Action Wrestling for the TNA One Night Only Gut Check pay-per-view. Richards won when Kozina went up top for a moonsault, but slipped off and Richards got the roll up for the win.

=== Fale Dojo (2018–present) ===
On May 28, 2018 Bad Luck Fale owner of Fale Dojo in New Zealand announced Kozina as their head trainer.

== Filmography ==
Film
Year	Title	Role	Notes
2016	Time Toupee	Tony Donovan	
2017	The Damnedwich	Pastor Troy	Short
2018	Ring Warriors	Himself	Documentary

== Championships and accomplishments ==
- American Wrestling Association Superstars of Wrestling
  - AWA Washington Light Heavyweight Championship (1 time)
- Canadian Wrestling's Elite
  - Canadian Unified Junior Heavyweight Championship (3 times)
- Extreme Canadian Championship Wrestling
  - NWA Canadian Junior Heavyweight Championship (3 times)
  - NWA Pacific Northwest Junior Heavyweight Championship (6 times)
- National Wrestling Alliance
  - NWA World Junior Heavyweight Championship (2 times)
- National Wrestling Alliance Virginia
  - NWA Virginia Junior Heavyweight Championship (1 time)
- Pinnacle Pro Wrestling
  - Pinnacle Tag Team Championship (1 time) – with Davey Richards
- Pro Wrestling Illustrated
  - PWI ranked him #179 of the 500 best singles wrestlers of the year in the PWI 500 in 2002
- Slam! Wrestling
  - Canadian Hall of Fame
