= Elite Canadian Championship Wrestling =

Canadian professional wrestling promotion

- Acronym: ECCW
- Founded: 1996
- Defunct: 2020
- Style: Canadian professional wrestling
- Headquarters: Vancouver, British Columbia, Canada
- Founder: Dave Republic
- Owner(s): ECCW Entertainment, Ltd.
- Formerly: Extreme Canadian Championship Wrestling
- Merged with: Top Ranked Wrestling
- Website: eccw.com

Elite Canadian Championship Wrestling (ECCW) (formerly known as NWA: Extreme Canadian Championship Wrestling and Extreme Canadian Championship Wrestling) was a Canada-based professional wrestling promotion and a former member of the National Wrestling Alliance. By 2014 it was Canada's largest wrestling promotion. It was the focus of the 2010 documentary This Wrestling Life, and was used as the scene for the independent movie Kayfabe. In 2020 the company was defunct.

== Championships and accomplishments ==
Deactivated championships

- ECCW Championship
- ECCW Canadian Championship
- ECCW Women's Championship
- ECCW Tag Team Championship
- ECCW Hardcore Championship
- ECCW Vancouver Island Championship

Other accomplishments

- ECCW Pacific Cup

== Notable wrestlers ==
Some of the notable wrestlers were:

- Scotty Mac
- Christina Von Eerie
- Aaron Idol
- Bobby Sharp
- Bryan Danielson
- Christopher Daniels
- Davey Richards
- Doink the Clown
- El Phantasmo
- Eric Young
- Gama Singh
- The Honky Tonk Man
- Jack Evans
- Jim Neidhart
- Juggernaut
- Kurrgan
- Kyle O'Reilly
- Matt Borne
- Mattias Wild
- Nova
- Puma
- Rikishi
- Sabu
- Steve Corino
- Steve Rizzono
- Tito Santana
- TJ Wilson
- Tommy Dreamer
- Tony Kozina
- Kia Stevens
- Cheerleader Melissa
- Davina Rose
- Lisa Moretti
- K. C. Spinelli
- LuFisto
- Nattie Neidhart
- Olympia Hartauer
- Rebecca Knox
- Taya Valkyrie
- Scott Henson
- Lindsay Hart

== See also ==
- List of National Wrestling Alliance territories
- List of independent wrestling promotions in Canada
- The Weirdo Hero, film shot with the help of ECCW
