= List of twins =

List of notable twins

This is a list of notable twins, siblings resultant from a multiple birth.

== Actors ==
- Raymond and Richard Gutierrez (1984–)
- David and Anthony Meyer (1972–)
- Gabriela and Daniela Spanic (1973–)
- Dylan and Cole Sprouse (1993–)

== Artists ==
- Dean and Dan Caten (1964–)
- Mishel Feldman and Nicol Feldman (1996–)
- Os Gêmeos (1974–)
- Tim (1939–2006) and Greg Hildebrandt (1939–2024)
- Masashi and Seishi Kishimoto (1974–)
- Kilmeny Niland (1950–2009) and Deborah Niland (1950–)
- Anton Pieck (1895–1987) and Henri Pieck (1895–1972)
- Moses (1899–1974) and Raphael Soyer (1899–1987)
- Doug and Mike Starn (1961–)
- Jerome Witkin and Joel-Peter Witkin (1939–)

== Authors and writers ==
- Julius (1909–2000) and Philip Epstein (1909–1952)
- Julia DeVillers and Jennifer Roy
- Matthew and Michael Dickman (1975–)
- June (1963–) and Jennifer Gibbons (1963–1993), "The Silent Twins"
- Austin and Lev Grossman (1969–)
- Alex and Brett Harris (1988–)
- Linda and Terry Jamison (1965–)
- Eppie Lederer (1918–2002) and Pauline Phillips (1918–2013), née Esther Pauline Friedman and Pauline Esther Friedman; professionally known, respectively, as Ann Landers (from 1955) and Abigail Van Buren/Dear Abby
- Ross (1925–1975) and Norris McWhirter (1925–2004)
- Anthony (1926–2001) and Peter Shaffer (1926–2016)
- Agnes (1843–1926) and Margaret Smith (1843–1920)
- Brittany and Brianna Winner (1995–)

== Businesspeople ==
- David and Frederick Barclay (1934–)
- Randolph Apperson Hearst (1915–2000) and David Whitmire Hearst (1915–1986)
- Bill and Bob Meistrell
- Freelan Oscar Stanley (1849–1940) and Francis Edgar Stanley (1849–1918)
- Cameron and Tyler Winklevoss (1981–)

== Filmmakers ==
- Ludovic and Zoran Boukherma (1992–)
- John (1913–1985) and Roy Boulting (1913–2001)
- Matt and Ross Duffer (1984–)
- Allen and Albert Hughes (1972–)
- George (1942–2011) and Mike Kuchar (1942–)
- Danny and Michael Philippou (1992-)
- Mark and Michael Polish (1970–)
- Stephen and Timothy Quay (1947–)
- Jen and Sylvia Soska (1983–)

== Models ==
- Shane and Sia Barbi (1963–)
- Derek and Keith Brewer (1973–)
- Kyle and Lane Carlson (1978–)
- Ava and Leah Clements (2010–)

== Music ==
- Fuwawa and Mococo Abyssgard, members of FuwaMoco
- Natalie and Nicole Albino, members of Nina Sky
- Jay (John) and Michael Aston (1957–), of Gene Loves Jezebel (1980–1989; 1995–1997)
- Miko and Yumi Bai of By2
- Didem and Sinem Balık, opera singers
- George and Jack Barnett, members of These New Puritans
- David Michael and Isabella "Bunny" Bennett, members of Steam Powered Giraffe
- Mike and Pete Bishop, members of The Bishops
- Anders and Jonas Björler, members of At the Gates and The Haunted
- Claire and Antoinette Cann, piano duo
- Brian and Brandon Casey, members of Jagged Edge
- Jamie and Vincent Cavanagh, members of Anathema
- Alex and Gregg Chamberlain, Twin duo called New Horizon singers, songwriters and Tiktokers
- Andrew and Brian Chaplin (1990–), members of South African-based electro duo Locnville
- ChoA and Way of Crayon Pop
- Alex and Nels Cline (1956–), avant-garde musicians
- Keven "Dino" (1974–2003) and Solomon "Shazam" Conner (1974–), members of H-Town
- Andraé (1942–2015) and Sandra Crouch (1942–), gospel singers
- Katie and Allison Crutchfield, members of P.S. Eliot
- Cherie Currie and Marie Currie, singers
- Kelley and Kim Deal, members of The Breeders
- Alejandra and Claudia Deheza of the band School of Seven Bells
- Niki and Gabi DeMartino, singers and media personalities
- Aaron and Bryce Dessner, members of The National
- Tom and David Farmer, members of Blackfoot Sue
- Lamb and Lynx Gaede, members of Prussian Blue
- Marge (1948–1996) and Mary Ann Ganser (1948–1970), members of The Shangri-Las
- Robin (1949–2012) and Maurice Gibb (1949–2003), members of the Bee Gees
- Paweł and Łukasz Golec, members of Golec uOrkiestra
- Matt and Luke Goss (29 September 1968–), members of Bros
- John and Edward Grimes (1991–), pop duo Jedward
- Angus and Anthony Guo (1981-), members of 2moro
- Marcus and Martinus Gunnarsen, pop duo Marcus & Martinus
- Tim and Phil Hanseroth, members of Brandi Carlile's band
- Christoph and Anton Hochheim, members of The Depreciation Guild
- Rommel and Robert Hinds-Grannum, hip-hop duo A-Game
- Ryu Hwa-young of T-ara and Ryu Hyo-young of Coed School (1993–)
- Warattha and Charattha Imraporn (a.k.a. Noey and Jam), Thai pop duo Neko Jump
- Monica and Gabriela Irimia (1982–), pop duo The Cheeky Girls
- Emi and Yumi Ito (1941–), pop duo The Peanuts
- Yusuke and Hisato Izaki, members of Flame
- Ryan and Gary Jarman (1980–) members of The Cribs
- Jo Kwang-min and Jo Young-min of Boyfriend (1995–)
- Ben and James Johnston, members of Biffy Clyro
- Sukriti Kakar and Prakriti Kakar, Indian playback singers
- Herbert and Harold Kalin, the Kalin Twins
- Marianna and Stephanie Kapsetaki (1991–), piano duo
- Péter and Zoltán Katona (1968–), guitar duo Katona Twins
- Bill and Tom Kaulitz (1989–), members of Tokio Hotel
- Heather and Jennifer Kinley, country music duo The Kinleys
- Felisha and Fallon King, members of Cherish
- Rafi and Sevan Kirder (1980–), members of Red Shamrock and ex-members of Eluveitie
- Joshua and Jacob Kiszka, members of Greta Van Fleet
- Camille and Kennerly Kitt, harp duo The Harp Twins
- Ryan and Dan Kowarsky, duo RyanDan
- Supachaya Lattisophonkul and Pailin Rattanasangsatian (a.k.a. Bell and HwaHwa), Thai pop duo China Dolls
- Remy and Pascal Le Boeuf, jazz duo Le Boeuf Brothers
- Nathan and Matthew Leone, members of Madina Lake
- Sari and Romy Lightman, members of Tasseomancy
- Evan and Jaron Lowenstein, duo Evan and Jaron
- Edele and Keavy Lynch (1979–), members of B*Witched
- Peggy and Patsy Lynn, The Lynns
- Megan and Liz Mace, aka Megan & Liz
- Benji and Joel Madden (1979–), members of Good Charlotte and The Madden Brothers
- Michael and John McGlynn (1964–), directors of Anúna
- Wendy and Susannah Melvoin (1964–), singers and former members of Prince's backup band The Revolution
- Kenji and Koji Mihara, members of Frederic (band)
- Jacob and Joshua Miller, members of Nemesis Rising
- Gabriela and Mihaela Modorcea (1985–), duo Indiggo
- Ben and Alex Moore, members of Oliver Riot
- Alanis and Wade Morissette (1974–), singer/songwriters
- Sakamoto Naoya and Sakamoto Kazuya, of On/Off
- Christina and Michelle Naughton, piano duo
- Gunnar and Matthew Nelson, members of band Nelson
- Miriam and Olivia Nervo, members of NERVO
- Jeni and Kyndi Niquette, pop rock duo Jen and Kat
- Peter and Paul Okoye, members of P-Square
- Jacob and Joshua Olds, members of Family Force 5
- Ferhan & Ferzan Önder, piano duo
- Lisa and Jessica Origliasso, pop duo The Veronicas
- Simone and Amedeo Pace, members of Blonde Redhead
- Charles (1948–) and John Panozzo (1948–1996), members of Styx
- Güher and Süher Pekinel, piano duo
- Mary and Geraldine Peppin, piano duo
- John and Joshua Pritchard, members of Ruin/Renewal and Brother & Co.
- Tegan and Sara Quin (1980–), members of indie music duo Tegan and Sara
- Charlie and Craig Reid, folk duo The Proclaimers
- John Len Ruela and Len John Ruela Pearce (1991–), members of Justice Crew
- Paul (1948–1992) and Barry Ryan (1948–), formed the group Paul and Barry Ryan
- Gabriel and Michael Saalfield, The Royce Twins, singer songwriters of Australia
- Lee and Tyler Sargent, members of Clap Your Hands Say Yeah
- Keith and Kevin Schultz, members of Keith, Kevin and Air
- Denny and Kenny Scott, members of Swirl 360
- Walter and Wallace "Scotty" Scott, members and lead singers of The Whispers
- Tom and Dan Searle, members of Architects
- Wyatt and Fletcher Shears, members of The Garden
- Toni and Trisha Sherwood, members of 11:30
- Stuart and James Steele, members of Exit Ten
- Ani and Nia Sulkhanishvili (1988–), piano duo
- Daniel ("Dan") and Eric Tadros, members of Tadros
- Anastasiya and Maria Tolmachevy, child singers; won the Junior Eurovision Song Contest
- Gyða and Kristín Anna Valtýsdóttir, former members of múm
- Janice and Jill Vidal, singers
- Mona and Lisa Wagner, members of The MonaLisa Twins
- Chandra and Leigh Watson, members of The Watson Twins
- Andrew and David Williams, members of The Williams Brothers
- Andy and Jez Williams, members of Doves
- Marvin and Carvin Winans (1958–)
- Ben and Zach Yudin, members of Cayucas
- Xion, a member of Oneus, and Dongmyeong, a member of Onewe

== Politicians ==
- Didier (1937–2024) and Franck Borotra (1937–)
- Barbara Bush and Jenna Bush Hager (1981–)
- Julian and Joaquin Castro (1974–)
- Jean-Louis (1944–2025) and Bernard Debré (1944–2020)
- Angela and Maria Eagle (1961–), British MPs
- Jaynet and Joseph Kabila (1971–)
- Jarosław (1949–) and Lech Kaczyński (1949–2010)
- Jerry Kilgore and Terry Kilgore (1961–)
- Mariana Mortágua and Joana Mortágua (1986–), Portuguese MPs and daughters of Camilo Mortágua
- Nechirvan Barzani (1966–) (2nd President of Kurdistan Region) and Dilovan Barzani (1966‒2018)

== Religion ==
- Jacob and Esau, sons of Isaac
- Pharez and Zerah, sons of Judah
- Shatrughna and Lakshmana, sons of Dasharatha
- Lava and Kusha, sons of Rama
- Nakula and Sahadeva, sons of Pandu
- Benedict (480–547) and Scholastica (480–543)
- Cosmas and Damian (c. 3rd century AD-c. 303 or 287)
- Crispin and Crispinian (c. 3rd century AD-286)
- Florus and Laurus (c. 2nd century AD)
- Gervasius and Protasius (c. 2nd century AD)
- Mark and Marcellian (c. 3rd century AD-c. 286)
- Michael Ball (1932–), retired Bishop of Truro, and Peter Ball (1932 – 2019), retired Bishop of Gloucester and convicted sex offender, co-founders of the Community of the Glorious Ascension
- 10th Jebtsundamba Khutuktu (2015-)

== Royalty ==
- Antiochus XI Epiphanes (124/109 BCE – 93 BCE) and Philip I Philadelphus (124/109 BCE – 83 or 75 BCE)
- Alexander Helios (b. 40 BCE) and Cleopatra Selene II (40 BCE–6 CE)
- Ramon Berenguer II (1053/54–1082) and Berenguer Ramon II (1053/54–1097/99)
- James II of Scotland (1430–1460) and Alexander Stewart, Duke of Rothesay (1430–1430)
- Lady Eliza Spencer and Lady Amelia Spencer (1992–), British models and socialites, nieces of Diana, Princess of Wales
- Princess Louise Élisabeth of France (1727–1759) and Princess Henriette of France (1727–1752)
- Philipp, Landgrave of Hesse (1896–1980) and Prince Wolfgang of Hesse (1896–1989)
- Prince Christoph (1901–1940) and Prince Richard of Hesse (1901–1969), younger brothers of Philipp and Wolfgang
- Princess Aisha and Princess Sara bint Al Faisal (1997–)
- Prince Alexander and Prince Philip of Yugoslavia (1982–)
- Prince Dimitri of Yugoslavia and Prince Michael of Yugoslavia (1958–)
- Prince Sergius of Yugoslavia and Princess Helene of Yugoslavia (1963–), younger siblings of Dimitri and Michael
- Prince Jaime, Count of Bardi and Princess Margarita of Bourbon-Parma (1972–)
- Prince Jean and Princess Margaretha of Luxembourg (1957–)
- Prince Vincent and Princess Josephine of Denmark (2011–), fraternal twins of King Frederik X of Denmark and Queen Mary of Denmark
- Shah Mohammad Reza Pahlavi (1919–1980) and Princess Ashraf Pahlavi of Iran (1919–2016)
- Sempad (1276/1277–1310/1311) and Isabella of Armenia (1276/1277–1323)
- Victoire de Valois (1556–1556) and Jeanne de Valois (died as an infant), twin daughters of Henry II of France and Catherine de Medici
- Princess Amalie (1776–1823) and Caroline of Baden (1776–1841), Caroline was mother of two sets of twins: Elizabeth and Amalie; Sophie and Maria
- Elisabeth Ludovika of Bavaria (1801–1873) and Princess Amalie Auguste of Bavaria (1801–1877), older sisters to Sophie and Maria; older twin daughters of Caroline
- Princess Sophie of Bavaria (1805–1872) and Princess Maria Anna of Bavaria (1805–1877), younger sisters to Elizabeth and Amalie; younger twin daughters of Caroline
- Umberto of Vidin (1999–) and Sofia of Vidin (1999–), twins of Prince Konstantin-Assen of Vidin, Prince of Bulgaria and María García de la Rasilla y Gortázar.
- Princess Gabriella, Countess of Carladès and Jacques, Hereditary Prince of Monaco, (10 December 2014–), fraternal twins of Prince Albert II of Monaco and Princess Charlene of Monaco
- Princess Henriette of Belgium (1870–1948) and Princess Joséphine Marie of Belgium (1870–1871)
- Prince Nicolas and Prince Aymeric of Belgium (2005–), sons of Prince Laurent of Belgium and Princess Claire of Belgium
- Princess Antonia and Prince Rupert of Prussia (1955–)
- David II of Scotland (1324–1371) and John (1324–1327)
- Archduchess Hermine of Austria (1817–1842) and Archduke Stephen of Austria (1817–1867)
- Franz Wilhelm Prinz von Preussen (1943–) and Prince Friedrich Christian Ludwig of Prussia (1943)
- Stephen II of Hungary (1101–1131) and Ladislaus
- Prince Gabriel of Thurn and Taxis (1922–1942) and Princess Michaela of Thurn and Taxis (1922)
- Princess Henriette Adelaide of Savoy (1636–1676) and Princess Catherine Beatrice of Savoy (1636–1637)
- Maria Teresa of Savoy (1803–1879) and Maria Anna of Savoy (1803–1884)
- Maria Cristina of Naples and Sicily (1779–1849) and Maria Cristina Amelia of Naples and Sicily (1779–1783)
- Duchess Elsa of Württemberg (1876–1936) and Duchess Olga of Württemberg (1876–1932)

== Scientists ==
- Eric and Ian Agol (1970–)
- Alex and Michael Bronstein (1980–)
- Brian and Keith Conrad (1970–)
- Frank and John Craighead (1916–2001 & 2016)
- Henryk and Tadeusz Iwaniec (1947–)
- Mark and Scott Kelly (1964–)
- Stewart and Cyril Marcus (1930–1975)
- Oleg and Igor Minin (1960– )
- Jean Felix Piccard (1884-1963) and Auguste Piccard (1884-1962)
- Riazuddin (1930–2013) and Fayyazuddin (1930–)
- Sun Zhiwei and Sun Zhihong (1965–)
- Xand and Chris van Tulleken (1978–)
- Erik and Herman Verlinde (1962–)
- Akiva and Isaak Yaglom (1921–2007 & 1988)
- Alexei (1952–2007) and Alexander Zamolodchikov (1952–)

== Sportspeople ==
=== Artistic gymnastics ===
- Alice and Asia D'Amato (2003–)
- Jennifer and Jessica Gadirova (2004–)
- Paul and Morgan Hamm (1982–)
- Abigail and Emily Roper (2005-)
- Lieke and Sanne Wevers (1991–)

=== Auto racing ===
- Mario (1940–) and Aldo Andretti (1940–2020)
- Amber Cope and Angela Ruch (1983–)
- Tim and Tom Coronel (1972–)

=== Baseball umpires ===
- Mike and Ray DiMuro (1967–), sons of longtime Major League Baseball umpire Lou DiMuro. Both were substitute umpires in the late 1990s before Mike was hired to the full-time staff in 1999. The only year they overlapped was the 1997 season. They served on the same umpire crew for two games late in the season, Texas at Oakland on September 23 & 24. Ray was the home plate umpire for the first game, and Mike for the second game.

=== Beach volleyball ===
- Christoph and Markus Dieckmann (1976–)
- Emilia and Erika Nyström (1983–)

=== Biathlon ===
- Valentyna and Vita Semerenko (1986–)

=== Boxing ===
- McWilliams and McJoe Arroyo (1985–)
- Jermall and Jermell Charlo (1990–)
- Kaokor and Khaosai Galaxy (1959–)
- Pat and Luke McCormack (1995–)
- Jamie and Gavin McDonnell (1986–)
- Jason and Andrew Moloney (1991–)
- Volodymyr and Valeriy Sydorenko (1976–)
- Dora and Cora Webber (1958–)

=== Figure skating ===
- Amanda and Isabelle Nylander (1990–)

=== Golf ===
- Nicolai and Rasmus Højgaard (2001–)
- Leona and Lisa Maguire (1994–)

=== Horse racing jockeys ===
- Richard and Michael Hills (1963–)

=== Ice dancing ===
- Antonia and Ferdinand Becherer (1963–)
- Isabelle and Véronique Delobel (1978–)

=== Ice hockey ===
- Carlo and Paulo Colaiacovo (1983–)
- Mackie Samoskevich and Maddy Samoskevich (2002–)

=== Mixed martial arts ===
- Matt and Mark Hughes (1973–)
- Antônio Rodrigo Nogueira and Antônio Rogério Nogueira (1976–)

=== Motocross ===
- Lucas and Sacha Coenen (2006-)

=== Mountain running ===
- Bernard and Martin Dematteis (1986–)

=== Paralympics ===
- Bernadett and Ilona Biacsi (1985–)

=== Race walking ===
- Edward and Yerko Araya (1986–)

=== Rhythmic gymnastics ===
- Arina and Dina Averina (1998–)

=== Road bicycle racing ===
- Alexander and Vladimir Efimkin (1981–)
- Ava and Isabella Holmgren (2005–)
- Javier (1974–2018) and Ricardo Otxoa (1974–2001)
- Jolanta and Rasa Polikevičiūtė (1970–)
- Mick and Tim van Dijke (2000–)
- Martin and Peter Velits (1985–)
- Alexandre Vinokurov and Nicolas Vinokurov (2002–)
- Adam and Simon Yates (1992–)

=== Rowing ===
- Mark and Mike Evans (1957–)
- Caroline and Georgina Evers-Swindell (1978–)
- Kerstin and Manja Kowalski (1976–)
- Anja and Dana Pyritz (1970–)
- Cameron and Tyler Winklevoss (1981–)

=== Rugby union ===
- Jim and Finlay Calder (1957–)
- David and Malcolm Changleng (1970–)
- Felipe and Manuel Contepomi (1977–)
- Ben and Tom Curry (1998-)
- Marcello (1966-) and Massimo Cuttitta (1966-2021)
- Jean-Luc and Dan du Preez (1995-)
- Anthony and Saia Fainga'a (1987–)
- Jack and Josh Goodhue (1995–)
- Akona and Odwa Ndungane (1981–)
- Mike and Dan Pletch (1983–)
- Adam Cutts and Bob Wilson (1987-)

=== Sailing ===
- Tõnu and Toomas Tõniste (1967–)

=== Shooting sports ===
- Eric (1880–1963) and Vilhelm Carlberg (1880–1970)

=== Skiing ===
- Barbara and Johannes Aigner (2005–)
- Harald and Hedda Østberg Amundsen (1998–) (cross-country)
- Sharon (1953–) and Shirley Firth (1953–2013)
- Phil and Steve Mahre (1957–)
- Kenji and Tsugiharu Ogiwara (1969–)
- Lotta and Tiril Udnes Weng (1996–) (cross-country)

=== Speed skating ===
- Michel and Ronald Mulder (1986–)

=== Swimming ===
- Mildred and Marianne Muis (1968–)
- Bengt and Björn Zikarsky (1967–)

Coaches:

- Bob and Dave Barney (1932–)

=== Taekwondo ===
- Ana and Lucija Zaninović (1987–)

=== Track and field ===
- Omolade and Omotayo Akinremi (1974–)
- Me'Lisa and Mikele Barber (1980–)
- Patrick and Pascal Barré (1959–)
- Bella and Judy Bell-Gam (1956–)
- Nicholas Bett (1990–2018) and Aron Koech (1990–)
- Kevin and Jonathan Borlée (1988–)
- Dionísio and Domingos Castro (1963–)
- Giulio and Nicola Ciotti (1976–)
- Tia and Tina Clayton (2004–)
- Jörg and Uwe Freimuth (1961–)
- Anna and Lisa Hahner (1989–)
- Alvin and Calvin Harrison (1974–)
- Jenny and Susanna Kallur (1981–)
- Amanda and Hana Moll (2005–)
- Laviai and Lina Nielsen (1996-)
- Eugene and Jaimie Omalla (2000–)
- Hiromi and Takami Ominami (1975–)
- Birgit and Gabi Rockmeier (1973–)
- Antonio and Piero Selvaggio (1958–)
- Shigeru and Takeshi So (1953–)

=== Triathlon ===
- Dan and Ran Alterman (1980–)
- Isabelle and Béatrice Mouthon (1966–)

=== Wrestling ===
- Anatoly and Sergei Beloglazov (1956–)
- Tom and Terry Brands (1968–)
- Kenichi and Shin'ichi Yumoto (1984–)

=== Other ===
Twins who competed in different sports from each other include:

- Alexe Gilles (figure skating) and Piper Gilles (ice dancing) (1992–)
- Phil Neville (association football) and Tracey Neville (netball) (1977–)
- Ángel Rodríguez (association football) and Déborah Rodríguez (track and field) (1992–)
- Yao Daogang (men's association football) and Yao Wei (women's association football) (1997–)

=== Performers ===
Listed here are fields involving athletic performance but not necessarily athletic competition.

Mountaineering:

- Tashi and Nungshi Malik (1991–), first female twins to complete the Seven Summits, the Three Poles Challenge, and the Explorers Grand Slam together.

Professional wrestling:

- The Bella Twins (1983–), real names Brianna Danielson and Nicole Garcia-Colace
- Hannah and Holly Blossom (1988–), real names Lucy and Kelly Knott
- Brahman Brothers (1977–), real names Shu and Kei Sato
- Jonathan and Joshua Fatu (1985–), professional wrestlers better known as Jimmy and Jey Uso
- Sam and Solofa Fatu (1965–), professional wrestlers; Solofa is better known as Rikishi. Solofa is also the father of the aforementioned Jonathan and Joshua Fatu.
- Harris Brothers (1961–)
- The Headhunters (1968–), real names Manuel and Victor Santiago
- Earl (1949–) and Dave Hebner (1949–2022)
- Renegade Twins (2000–), real names Charlette and Robyn Williamson
- Mike and Todd Shane (1967–)
- Chris and Patrick Vörös (1993–)

Theatrical gymnastics:

- Pierre and Pablo Caesar (1980–)
- Karyne and Sarah Steben (1974–) (trapeze)

== Twins notable in each of their own separate fields ==
- Paul and Andrea Boardman (1967–)
- Nyle and Nico DiMarco (1989–)
- David Gulpilil (1953–2021) and Mary Dhalapany (1953–)
- Jill and Jacqueline Hennessy (1968–)
- Jay (1948-) and Jed Johnson (1948-1996)
- Monique and Ingrid Kavelaars (1971–)
- Laverne Cox and M Lamar (1972–)
- Rita (1909–2012) and Paola Levi-Montalcini (1909–2000)
- Marcus and Morgan Luttrell (1975–)
- Alexandra and Caroline Paul (1963–)
- Charlotte and Samantha Ronson (1977–)
- Carol and Mark Thatcher (1953–)
- Gloria Morgan Vanderbilt (1904–1965) and Thelma Furness, Viscountess Furness (1904–1970)

== Other ==
- The "Twin Foxes", Albert (1857–1937) and Ebenezer (1857–1926) Fox, poachers
- Barney M. Giles and Benjamin Franklin Giles (1892—1984), military officers
- Johnny and Luther Htoo (c. 1988–), guerrilla leaders
- Cary and Michael Huang (1997–), American YouTubers and animators
- Linda and Terry Jamison (1965–), psychics
- The Kray twins, Reggie (1933–2000) and Ronald (1933–1995), organised crime
- Philip and Andrew Oliver (1968–), video game developers
- Paula and Bridgette Powers (1974–), Australian conservationists who often receive attention for their ability to speak synchronously
- David and Peter Turnley (1955–), photojournalists
- Poto and Cabengo (1970–), who invented a language to speak to each other

Other criminal incidents involving twins:

- Death of Nikki Whitehead
- Han twins murder conspiracy
- Ursula and Sabina Eriksson

== Conjoined twins ==
- Carmen and Lupita Andrade (2000–)
- Ladan and Laleh Bijani (1974–2003)
- Chang and Eng Bunker (1811–1874), the original "Siamese twins"
- Ronnie and Donnie Galyon (1951–2020), the world’s oldest conjoined twins to ever live.
- Ilona and Judit Gófitz (1701–1723)
- Abby and Brittany Hensel (born 1990), oldest surviving conjoined twins sharing a completely undivided torso; became elementary school teachers in 2013.
- Daisy and Violet Hilton (1908–1969)
- Millie and Christine McKoy (1851–1912)
- Radhika and Dudhika Nayak (born 1888; Dudhika died in 1902, Radhika in 1903)
- Spider Girls, Ganga and Jamuna Mondal (born Ayara and Jayara Ratun in 1969 or 1970)
- Giuseppina Foglia (1956—) e Santina Foglia (1956—2022) first twins divided in Europe with a successful surgical separation

== Notable people with a non-famous twin ==
- Brooke Adams, fraternal twin sister
- James Alexandrou, twin sister
- Chad Allen, twin sister
- Stephen K. Amos, twin sister
- Carl Anderson, twin brother died as an infant
- Kofi Annan, twin sister
- Carlos Arroyo, identical twin brother
- Richie Ashburn, twin sister
- Lillian Asplund, twin brother
- Nichole Ayers, twin sister
- Gracia Baur, twin sister
- Marc Bartra, twin brother
- Albert Belle, twin brother
- Blaze Berdahl, twin sister
- Josh Bernstein, twin brother
- Jonathon Blum, twin sister died in a house fire in 2004
- Eugenie Bouchard, fraternal twin sister
- Crystal Bowersox, fraternal twin brother
- Nicholas Brendon, twin brother
- Bob Brown, twin sister
- Gisele Bündchen, fraternal twin sister
- Aaron Carter, twin sister
- Gabrielle Carteris, twin brother
- Candis Cayne, fraternal twin brother
- Karen Cellini, twin sister
- Kai Cenat, twin sister
- Justin Chambers, twin brother
- Keith Chegwin, twin brother
- Gary Cherone, fraternal twin brother
- Montgomery Clift, twin sister
- Henry Cooper, twin brother
- Bucky Covington, twin brother
- Curley Culp, twin sister
- Alissa Czisny, fraternal twin sister
- Andrew Daddo, fraternal twin
- Ann B. Davis, twin sister
- Anthony Davis, twin sister
- Cody Deal, twin brother
- Fennis Dembo, twin sister
- Philip K. Dick, twin sister died after birth
- Vin Diesel, fraternal twin brother
- Jamie Dimon, fraternal twin brother
- Hunter Drew, twin brother
- Duffy, twin sister
- Alain Eizmendi, identical twin brother
- Marc Elliott, twin sister
- Karen Elson, fraternal twin sister
- John Elway, twin sister
- Theo Epstein, twin brother
- Mike Espy, twin sister
- Jerry Falwell, twin brother
- Joseph Fiennes, twin brother
- Caroline Flack, twin sister
- John "Ecstasy" Fletcher (of Whodini), twin brother
- Adam Foote, twin sister
- Samantha Futerman, identical twin sister raised separately as a citizen of France
- Max Gail, twin sister
- Andy Garcia, born with deceased conjoined twin brother
- Lucía García, twin brothers
- Dave Gorman, twin brother
- Noah Gragson, twin sister
- Eva Green, fraternal twin sister
- Jerry Hall, twin sister
- Linda Hamilton, twin sister
- Victor Davis Hanson, fraternal twin brother
- Ella Harper, unnamed twin brother died shortly after birth
- Gordon Hayward, twin sister
- William Randolph Hearst, twin died as an infant
- Jon Heder, identical twin brother
- Marilu Henner, twin sister
- Jill Hennessy, identical twin sister
- John Hensley, fraternal twin sister
- Maurice Hilleman, twin sister died shortly after birth
- Alex Hirsch, twin sister
- Ryan Howard, twin brother
- Glenn Hysén, twin sister
- Sabrina Ionescu, twin brother
- Urtzi Iriondo, identical twin brother
- Carlin Isles, twin sister
- Marlon Jackson, twin brother died at birth
- David Jason, twin brother died during birth
- Chris Joannou, twin sister
- Scarlett Johansson, twin brother
- Siva Kaneswaran, twin brother
- Jay Kay, twin brother died at birth
- Tom Kean Jr., twin brother
- Cory Kennedy, fraternal twin sister
- Joseph P. Kennedy III, fraternal twin brother
- Junsu Kim, fraternal twin brother
- David Kohan, twin brother
- Ashton Kutcher, fraternal twin brother
- Gabriel Landeskog, twin sister
- Chris Lane, twin brother
- Kate Lawler, twin sister
- Gigi Leung, twin brother
- Liberace, twin died as an infant
- Tony Liberatore, twin brother
- Cory Lidle, twin brother
- Jon Lindsay, fraternal twin brother
- Thad Luckinbill, twin brother
- Tom Luginbill, twin sister
- Ukko-Pekka Luukkonen, twin brother
- Mikey Madison, twin brother
- John Maine, fraternal twin brother
- Rami Malek, identical twin brother
- Shawn Marion, twin sister
- Susie Maroney, fraternal twin
- Logan Marshall-Green, twin brother
- Roberta McCain, twin sister
- Paul McDermott, twin sister
- Jay McGuiness, identical twin brother
- Gene McKinney, twin brother
- Victor A. McKusick, twin brother
- Alma Miettinen, twin sister
- Tony Moran, twin sister
- Burt Munro, twin sister died at birth
- Olly Murs, fraternal twin brother
- Mandy Musgrave, identical twin sister
- Maye Musk, identical twin sister
- Martin Nievera, fraternal twin sister
- Gaute Ormåsen, fraternal twin brother
- Jason Orange, twin brother
- John Osborne, twin sister
- Melanie Oudin, twin sister
- Maisie Peters, twin sister
- Autumn Phillips, twin brother
- Parker Posey, twin brother
- Elvis Presley, twin brother died at birth
- Richard Quest, twin sister
- Dack Rambo, twin brother
- Efren Ramirez, identical twin brother
- Megan Rapinoe, twin sister
- Judy Reyes, twin sister
- Pekka Rinne, twin sister
- Marty Robbins, twin sister
- Isabella Rossellini, twin sister
- J. D. Roth, twin sister
- Stark Sands, fraternal twin brother
- Gorka Santamaría, identical twin brother
- Brian Schatz, twin brother
- Noah Schnapp, twin sister
- Judith Scott, twin sister
- Teemu Selänne, twin brother
- Sab Shimono
- Bill Shorten, twin brother
- Lori Singer, twin brother
- Tasha Smith, twin sister
- Katy Steele, twin brother
- Curtis Strange, twin brother
- Ed Sullivan, twin brother died as an infant
- Sandra Sully
- Charles Sumner, twin sister
- Kiefer Sutherland, twin sister
- Amanda Tapping, twin brother
- Adam Thomas, fraternal twin brother
- Jim Thome, twin sister
- Jim Thorpe, twin brother
- Frances Tiafoe, twin brother
- Jon Tickle, twin brother
- Garrett Tierney, identical twin brother
- Paul Tsongas, twin sister
- Ronan Tynan, twin brother died as an infant
- Derek Thompson, twin sister
- Matt Villalta, twin brother
- Sarah Vowell, twin sister
- Emppu Vuorinen, twin brother
- Wang Qiang, twin brother
- Shayne Ward, twin sister
- Mirjam Weichselbraun, twin sister
- Ellen G. White, twin sister
- Billy Dee Williams, twin sister
- Ricky Williams, twin sister
- Kane Williamson, twin brother
- Marvin Winans, twin brother
- Brad Womack, twin brother
- Bang Yong Guk, twin brother

== Twin records ==
- Jane Haskin (1924-2001) and John Prosser Haskin, Jr. (1924-2004), Guinness World Records “World’s Heaviest Twins” with an aggregate weight of 12.58 kg (27 lbs 12 oz), were born to Mary Ann Haskin (USA), of Fort Smith, Arkansas, USA on 20 February 1924.
- Gin Kanie (1892–2001) and Kin Narita (1892–2000), widely known for their longevity
- Benny (1947–2001) and Billy McGuire (1947–1979), heaviest ever twins at 814 and 784 pounds. Born in Hendersonville, NC, US in 1947. Billy died in 1979, Benny in 2001.
- Michael and James Lanier, World's tallest twins, at 7' 6" or 2.286 m.
- Edward and Daniel Hemberg (2005–), heaviest twins born in New Zealand (and at the time Australasia) via natural delivery (Edward 3.54 kg and Daniel 3.76 kg)

== See also ==
- List of triplets
- List of multiple births
- Twins in mythology
- Conjoined twins
