= Jack Doherty (YouTuber) =

American YouTuber and online streamer (born 2003)

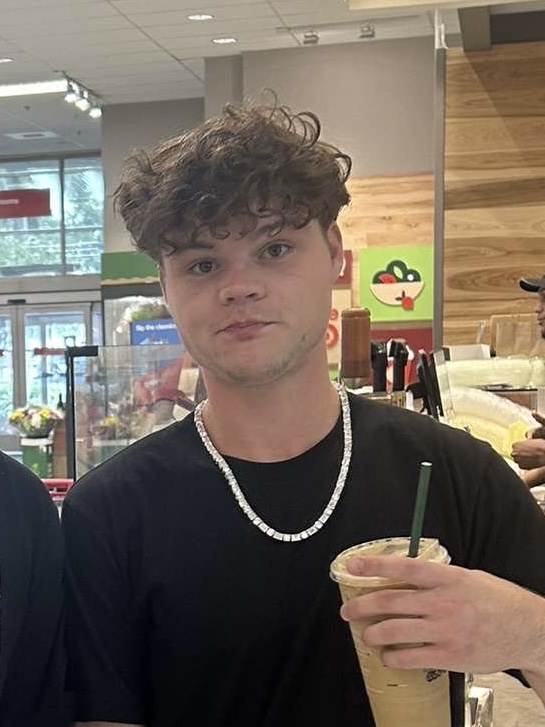
- Doherty in 2025
- Born: Jack Colin Doherty; October 8, 2003 (age 23); Long Island, New York, United States
- Occupation: YouTuber
- Years active: 2016–present

YouTube information
- Channel: Jack Doherty
- Genres: Stunts; pranks; in-real-life
- Subscribers: 15.1 million
- Views: 6.50 billion
- Last updated: April 4, 2026
- Website: www.jackdoherty.com

Jack Colin Doherty (born October 8, 2003) is an American influencer, YouTuber, and online streamer best known for performing stunts and pranks. He first rose to prominence in 2016 after his early bottle flipping videos.

Doherty has since become a controversial internet figure due to his pranks involving frequent public altercations, high-profile disputes, and several incidents related to his livestreams and personal conduct. In November 2025, Doherty was arrested in Florida for drug possession and was released shortly afterwards on bail. The following year, he was arrested in Fort Lauderdale, Florida, and charged with misdemeanor domestic battery.

== Internet career ==
Doherty uploaded a viral video titled "I FLIPPED ALL OF THESE!!". In October 2023, Doherty attended David Dobrik's Halloween party, where he was involved in a verbal altercation with other guests. The situation escalated when his bodyguard allegedly attacked one of the guests, leading to a lawsuit for assault and battery filed on February 21, 2024.

In 2024, during a live stream, Doherty hydroplaned along a Miami highway, crashing his McLaren 570S while looking at his phone while driving. This led to his ban from the streaming platform Kick, and his cameraman, Michael, receiving stitches on his head for his injuries. Doherty was cited by Florida Highway Patrol for using a wireless communication device while driving.

In October 2026, Doherty made his exhibition boxing debut on Adin Ross' BrandRisk 16 event. He defeated his opponent, Kodiyakredd, via technical knockout in the first round.

== Legal issues ==
On November 14, 2025, Doherty was arrested in Miami Beach, Florida, for traffic stunts, possession of a controlled substance (amphetamine), possession of marijuana, and resisting an officer without violence. Police say the arrest occurred after Doherty refused to move his vehicle despite blocking traffic. On November 15, 2025, Doherty was released on $3,500 bail and set to appear in court at a later date.

On September 4, 2026, Doherty was arrested and charged for domestic battery in Fort Lauderdale, Florida. He was released on $1,000 bail and ordered not to contact the alleged victim.

== Exhibition boxing record ==
1 fight	1 win	0 losses
By knockout	1	0

No.	Result	Record	Opponent	Type	Round, time	Date	Location	Notes
1	Win	1–0	Kodiyakredd	TKO	1 (3), 0:30	Oct 16, 2026	Brand Risk Warehouse, Miami, Florida, U.S.	
