= Brewer twins =

Twin models (born 1973)

- Born: Derek Brewer, Keith Brewer; September 21, 1973 (age 52); Torrance, California, United States
- Other name: BrewerTwins
- Modeling information
- Height: 5 ft 11 in (180 cm)
- Hair color: Blond
- Eye color: Blue
- Website: http://www.brewertwins.com

Derek and Keith Brewer, known as the Brewer twins, are male models.

== Biography ==
The twins were born on September 21, 1973, at Torrance Memorial Hospital in Torrance, California. Derek was born 15 minutes before Keith. Both brothers graduated from California State University, Dominguez Hills, with degrees in Business.

During their modeling career, the twins worked for clients such as GAP, Guess?, Yves Saint Laurent, Lipton, DEKA invest, Boss, Careline, and Armani. They were mentioned in the book Male Super Models, together with names like Markus Schenkenberg and David Fumero. They were ordained two of "The 50 Most Beautiful People in the World" by People magazine in 1998.

They have worked with photographers such as Bruce Weber, Steven Meisel, Tiziano Magni, Claus Wickwrath, Randall Mesdon, Marko Realmonte and also with model Cindy Crawford. They have appeared on the covers of Glamour, Esquire, Mizz, Sassy, Dolly, Student Life, Vogue, and Fortune. They are also amateur surfers and snowboarders. In 2003 they moved into the insurance business and opened their own insurance agency in 2013 in Redondo Beach, California.

== Filmography ==
Year	Title	Derek's role	Keith's role	Notes
1995	The Beast	Juror		Short film
1997	Nowhere	Ski	Surf	
2001	The Elite	Derek	Keith	

=== Television ===
Year	Title	Roles	Notes
1999	V.I.P.	Themselves	Season 1, Episode 14: "Val Under Siege with a Vengeance"

== See also ==
- Lane Twins
- Carlson twins
- List of twins
