= Voros =

Voros may refer to:

- Võros, ethnic group in Estonia
- Aaron Voros (born 1981), Canadian ice hockey player
- Chris and Patrick Vörös (born 1993), Canadian identical twins
- Christina Alexandra Voros (born 1977), American film director
- Jerry Voros (born 1930), chairman of the International Committee of the Boy Scouts of America
- Voros McCracken (born 1971), American baseball sabermetrician

== See also ==
- Vörös
