= List of triplets =

List of notable triplets

This is a list of notable triplets. One in about 8,100 natural pregnancies results in triplets.

- The mythological Irish Findemna, Bres, Nár, and Lothar, sometimes interpreted as triplets. Seduced by their sister Clothar when it was feared they would die without children.
- Tenskwatawa (1771–1836), Shawnee prophet and brother of Tecumseh, was one of a set of triplets.
- Petrus Nordin (1882–1927) a circus performer, and noted as the tallest man in Sweden at the time. His two brothers were not performers, and did not share his gigantism.
- The Kirchner triplets, Catherine, Marguerite, and Frances (born 23 August 1920 in Brooklyn, NY), believed to be the oldest identical living triplets in the United States.
- The Del Rubio triplets, Edith (B. Boyd), Elena (Boyd), and Milly (Boyd) (born 23 August 1921 in Panama), variety/musical act of the 1980s who rose to notoriety due mostly to their campy style of dress and their goofy interpretations of standards and songs of the era.
- Elisabeth Kübler-Ross (born 8 July 1926, in Zürich, Switzerland, died 24 August 2004 in Scottsdale, Arizona), psychiatrist and author perhaps best known for developing the "Five Stages of Grief", was one of a set of identical triplets.
- Carol Ann Toupes (31 January 1936 – 24 July 2004) was one of the Toupes triplets whose birth and early childhood captivated the San Francisco media of the day.
- Chris Dickerson (25 August 1939 – 23 December 2021) was an American professional bodybuilder, winning the Mr America and Mr Olympia titles. He was the youngest of triplets born to lawyer and advocate Mahala Ashley Dickerson.
- The Kosanovic triplets, identical males (born 28 November 1948, in Meadville, Pennsylvania), believed to be the oldest set of identical triplets in Oregon. Joe lives in Eagle Crest, Gerry lives in Corvallis, and Jim lives in Portland.
- María Laura, María Emilia, and María Eugenia Fernández Roussee (born 5 July 1960, in Argentina), identical triplets who worked as singers, actresses, and presenters in Argentinian radio, television, and cinema films, mainly in the 1970s and 1980s. They were known as Las Trillizas de Oro ("The Golden Triplets") in Spanish, and as Trix in Italy.
- Robert Shafran, David Kellman, and Eddy Galland (born 12 July 1961) were separated at birth in an adoption/twins study. Reunited in 1980 by coincidence, they were the subject of media attention at the time. They are mentioned in the 2007 memoir Identical Strangers, and their lives are the subject of the 2018 documentary Three Identical Strangers by film-maker Tim Wardle.
- The Levesque Triplets are identical triplet models who have walked together in various shows during New York Fashion Week and have appeared on multiple TV segments such as Good Morning America, E! Live from the Red Carpet to the Oscars, and Dr. Oz.
- Diana, Sylvia, and Vicky Villegas (born 18 April 1965) became famous briefly in the 1980s and 1990s as US/Latin pop group The Triplets. They had a hit with the song "You Don't Have To Go Home Tonight" in 1991.
- The Creel triplets, Leanna, Monica, and Joy (born 27 August 1970, in Los Angeles, California), starred in Parent Trap III and Parent Trap: Hawaiian Honeymoon, two Disney made-for-TV movies.
- The Haden triplets, Petra, Tanya, and Rachel (born 11 October 1971, in New York City), musicians who have performed individually in bands and together. They are the daughters of jazz double-bassist Charlie Haden.
- Nicole, Erica and Jaclyn Dahm (born 22 December 1977, in Minneapolis, Minnesota), identical triplets who were featured as Playmates in the December 1998 issue of Playboy magazine.
- The Karshner triplets of Lake Isabella, California, Craig, Nick, and Ryan (born 23 December 1982), models who have been featured in advertisements for Abercrombie & Fitch and Cingular.
- Bob, Clint, and Dave Moffatt (born 30 March 1984, in Tumbler Ridge, British Columbia), part of the Canadian family musical band The Moffatts. Bob and Clint are identical, while Dave is fraternal.
- Leila, Liina, and Lily Luik (born 14 October 1985), identical triplets from Estonia. They all competed in marathon at the 2016 Summer Olympics in Rio de Janeiro, becoming first set of triplets to have competed in the Olympics.
- The Armstrong triplets of Truro, Cornwall, United Kingdom, Lil, Helen, and Kate (born c. 1986), first triplets to have all been accepted into Cambridge University.
- The British boy band The Noise Next Door, is made up of triplets Craig, Scott and Ed Sutton (born 30 May 1986).
- Eino Puri, Sander Puri, and Kadri Puri (born 7 May 1988); Eino and Sander are footballers, Kadri is a volleyball player.
- Taylor Red, country music singers and identical triplet sisters Nicole Taylor, Natalie Taylor and Nika Taylor born 18 March 1991.
- Scottish Footballer Kyle Jacobs (born 14 June 1991) is a triplet alongside Devon and Sheldon.
- Leo, Gerry and Myles Fitzgerald (born 26 August 1993), played Sly and Whit in the 1999 film Baby Geniuses and also appeared as Kahuna in the sequel, Superbabies: Baby Geniuses 2 in 2004.
- Asad, Saqib and Sikander Zulfiqar (born 28 March 1997) are triplets who have each played international cricket for the Netherlands. Their father Zulfiqar Ahmed did likewise.
- Anna-Maria Alexandri, Eirini-Marina Alexandri, and Vasiliki Alexandri (born 15 September 1997) were born in Greece and compete as Austrians in synchronised swimming.
- The Dunn triplets, Zoe, Sophie and Emma Dunn (born 30 April 2000) are the only known deaf and blind triplets.
- The Sturniolo Triplets (born 1 August 2003) are fraternal triplets who run a collective YouTube channel with over seven million subscribers.

== See also ==
- List of twins
