= Super Milk Chan =

Japanese anime television series

- DVD cover featuring Milk.

スーパーミルクちゃん (Sūpā Miruku Chan)
- Genre: Parody, surreal comedy
- Anime television series
- Directed by: Hideyuki Tanaka
- Produced by: Kengo Kimura; Shin Torisawa
- Written by: Motoki Shina
- Music by: MOKU
- Studio: Tokyo Kids
- Licensed by: NA: ADV Films (2004–2009)
- Original network: Fuji TV (Flyer TV); Animax
- English network: US: Adult Swim Anime Network
- Original run: June 18, 1998 – September 24, 1998
- Episodes: 14
- Anime television series

OH! Super Milk Chan
- Directed by: Kiyohiro Omori
- Produced by: Hideyoshi Sukena; Toshiaki Anno; Kazumasa Watanabe; Masamitsu Morijiri; Masato Takami; Reiko Fukakusa
- Written by: Motoki Shina
- Music by: DJ Tasaka; MOKU; Ozaki
- Studio: Studio Pierrot
- Licensed by: NA: ADV Films (2004–2009)
- Original network: Space Shower TV (2000); Animax
- English network: CA: Razer (2006–2008); US: Adult Swim (2004–2006) Anime Network
- Original run: January 27, 2000 – April 13, 2000
- Episodes: 12

Super Milk Chan (スーパーミルクちゃん, Sūpā Miruku Chan) is a Japanese anime television series directed by Hideyuki Tanaka and produced by Genco, Suplex, framegraphics and Geneon Entertainment for Animax. The show pre-began as 14 eight-minute segment episodes which aired on Fuji Television's Flyer TV block from June 18 to September 24, 1998, from 24:45 to 24:55, with the animation being produced by Tokyo Kids. The full-length show, entitled OH! Super Milk Chan (OH！スーパーミルクチャン, OH! Sūpā Miruku Chan), ran for 12 twenty-four-minute episodes which aired on Space Shower TV from January 27 to April 13, 2000, at 19:00 and then 18:00.

The North American DVD release by A.D. Vision features two different English-dubbed versions: a straight translation of the original Japanese version (which was aired on Cartoon Network's Adult Swim block on November 7, 2004 with the original vintage episodes before making its official series premiere a week later) and an Americanized version with Western pop culture references and short live-action skits featuring ADV voice cast members.

== Summary ==
The show centers on the activities of Milk, a young 5-year-old superheroine who may or may not actually have any powers and usually can do very little besides making popular culture references. Its American slogan, as a result, became "Wholesome? Probably not. Good for you? Definitely." She lives in a house on a suspended platform with her malfunctioning robotic maid Tetsuko and her drunken pet slug Hanage (nosehair). The show follows a fairly linear formula. In each episode, the President (of "Everything", according to his name) calls with a new mission; whether Milk actually takes the mission is not guaranteed. Regardless of whether or not she takes the mission, she always takes credit and celebrates her success by going out for "sushi (or something)." Likewise, there are a number of other constants that follow through the series, often under contrived circumstances.

== Major characters ==
Milk (ミルク, Miruku) / Milk-chan (ミルクチャン, Miruku-chan)
Voiced by: Haruka Nakamura (Japanese); Hilary Haag (English)
The title character of the show, Milk is an infantile little girl whose status as a superhero is questionable. She is often selfish, vain, short-tempered, and has a habit of drooling, but is not devoid of decent qualities. She harbors a love-hate relationship with the President and Tetsuko, alternating between tormenting them and getting along with them. Although she works officially for the President, she chooses on her own whether or not she wants to follow his orders. Coincidentally, her house is in the shape of a baby bottle and she still drinks powdered milk from a baby bottle on occasion.
Tetsuko (テツコ, Tetsuko)
Voiced by: Ayumi Nagashi (Japanese); Monica Rial (direct translated version), Marcy Bannor (Americanized version) (English)
An obsolete robot maid, Tetsuko was created at the King's Idea Laboratory in 1982. She lives with and works for Milk. Tetsuko is a more conservative character, the only occasional voice of reason on the show when she is questioning Milk's greedy, questionable, or random decisions. She yearns for a stable traditional family life, which the living organisms around her do not even consider. Milk often calls her a piece of junk and Tetsuko is torn between loving Dr. Eyepatch (who may or may not be her "daddy") and being disappointed in him when he insults her or offers to replace her. She has the ability to generate a fart ("Tetsuko's gas") that is lethal enough to even kill a raging bear. The only character that brings out Tetsuko's aggressive side is Robodog, whom she hates. They are in a constant conflict over Milk's affection, much to Milk's amusement.
Hanage (ハナゲ, Hanage; born 2002)
Voiced by: Brad Pyutt (Japanese); Ben Pronsky (English)
Hanage is Milk's green, middle-aged pet slug known as a "Hanage". He has a drinking problem and is incapable of speech, though he can understand multiple languages. When he does speak, it's usually to express his thoughts; often a maudlin soliloquy, that are referred to as "the voice of Hanage's heart." "Hanage" means "nose hair" in Japanese.
President (大統領, Daitōryō; Born 1964)
Voiced by: Yuichi Nagashima (Japanese); Mike MacRae (English)
The President is a stout bald man who apparently runs the country Milk lives in (referred to only as "our nation", a subtle reference to the Japanese habit of referring to their country as such instead of using the proper names "Nihon" or "Nippon"). No one knows how he achieved his office. He assigns missions to Milk, but whether she takes them or not is her prerogative. The President proves to be inept and incapable at fulfilling his job, at one point firing his country's best missile (The Punishment Missile) on his own country at his own conclusion that his citizens would try to put him in the Guillotine or the electric chair. He has short, round arms and he frequently pounds on his desk when talking on the phone. The President likes cheap wine, loose women, and song, but he usually enjoys off-key karaoke. He also attracts flies and dearly loves his pet cat, Kanchi. His desk is decorated with a different anime or pop culture character figure on every episode.
Doctor Eyepatch (アイパッチ博士, Aipatchi Hakase; born 1966)
Voiced by: Nobuo Tobita (Japanese); Tommy Drake (English)
A mysterious blue humanoid with an eyepatch, a black cloak, and a robotic arm, Dr. Eyepatch runs the King's Idea Laboratory (王様のアイデア研究所, Ō-sama no Aidea Kenkyūsho). In each episode, he provides Milk with a new invention or gives information about topics of concern. Whether he created Tetsuko or not is never fully explained, but he always belittles her or offers to have her replaced. The eyepatch over Dr. Eyepatch's right eye changes its design every episode; sometimes it changes several times in the course of a single episode. He is seen only on a TV screen and he also once hosted the NG awards.
Landlord (大家, Ōya; born 1970)
Voiced by: Hidero (Japanese); Rob Mungle (English)
A purple-haired and white-skinned humanoid dressed in blue clothes and with a head shaped like a daikon radish. He is Milk's landlord. As Milk is perpetually over six months behind on her rent, he continually tries to get payment from her. However, whenever he tries to get the rent, she does or says something that shocks or tricks him, causing him to run back across the ladder to his own home. He is also anxious, as he once thought he lost his "purse," but shortly finds it after making a racket over it. The landlord is gay and this was disclosed in the Japanese version of Episode 9, "Financial Decay Peninsula". His being gay is openly referred to in more than one episode.
The Ant Family (アリの一家, Ari no Ikka)
Voiced by: Nobuo Tobita (Yoshiki Arita), Yūko Minaguchi (Helen) (Japanese); Todd Posthlewaite (Yoshiki Arita), Shelley Calene-Black (Helen Arita), David Matranga (Ario) (English)
A family of ants (a mother, a cuckolded father, and a baby larva) live underground near Milk's house. Their portion of the show chronicles their constant marital troubles. The family consists of Yoshiki Arita (蟻田 よしき, Arita Yoshiki), an overbearing, suspicious husband, Helen (ヘレン, Heren), an unfaithful wife, and Ario (アリ夫, Ario), their son. The family seems pretty neutral in the first three episodes, but things start to get tense afterwards. After noticing his wife's behavior and realizing that she is cheating, Yoshiki becomes more and more enraged, while Helen just denies it or changes the subject and talks to Ario. Eventually, Helen takes Ario and leaves. In the final episode of the show, Yoshiki writes a letter to his family and commits suicide.

== Other characters ==
Haruo
A robot that Tetsuko has a crush on. He only appears in the 1998 series.
The Counterfeiter
A counterfeiter who (really) likes Belgian waffles. He makes counterfeit bills to buy a lot of them. In the Japanese version, the real currency has pictures of "Kin" while the counterfeit bills have pictures of "Gin" - a reference to the oldest-living twins. In the Americanized version, the bills are differentiated by pictures of Mary-Kate and Ashley Olsen.
The Colonel
Presumably from the Navy, he and his assistant try in vain to get in contact with The President in trying to stop the Punishment Missile, but to no avail; The President is on the phone with Milk and quickly forgot about said missile. Quickly becoming a nervous wreck, The Colonel tries to get help from Dr. Eyepatch, only for the doctor to be absolutely unhelpful.
Kyuu the Myna Bird
A bird that Tetsuko started keeping, but died the next week. It looks like a toucan. His favorite thing is "Chaushu" and his favorite kind of girl is bouncy. One episode later, he is revealed to have died right away, like most myna birds do.
Kanchi (カンチ, Kanchi)
Voiced by: Manekineko Edoya
A very cute cat wearing a red dress that runs away from the president finding him disgusting for being too clinging and Milk and the gang have to find her. She is found in a place called Meow Meow World. At first she refuses to return to the president and claims that she can get by with subsidized dating, but after Milk reads the president's letter, she is moved to tears and decides to return. She was first found by the president in a cardboard box on a rainy day.
Leonardo the Japanese Bear
A violent bear from an Osaka bear farm. He defeats Robo Willy, but gets knocked out by Tetsuko's gas attack.
Pastel Mr. Shin (パステルしんさん, Pasuteru Shin-san)
A mentally disabled man dressed as a kindergarten student. He tries to get kids to play with him, but they can't because their parents said they couldn't. He gets shocked and throws a tantrum whenever they say he's not a kid. His name is a parody of Crayon Shin-chan.
Keizao Butae/Colonel Flanders
The factory manager of the Gentucky Pork Legs Factory, who resembles Colonel Sanders. While hitting on an employee, he accidentally presses the laser control button, shutting down the power of the Pork Gun which allows Tonkichi & Tononko to escape. Keizao then hires a hitman to take them out.
Barazou
A live-action cross-dressing man who appears frequently on the news. In the Americanized version, he is cut out and replaced by someone else.
Akiko Maitake (舞茸 秋子, Maitake Akiko)
Akiko is heard but never seen. She is seemingly a young Japanese girl who does video art. Her "art" is never much more than a pretentious monologue read by her as she takes a video of normal things happening in Japan. The videos are live action and cut randomly into the show in various episodes.
Tonkichi & Tonko / Palmer & Penny
Two pigs that are in love with each other. After escaping the Gentucky Pork Legs Factory, they defect to a country where people don't eat pork. As soon as they arrive, they are turned into pork legs by a hired hitman. Tonkichi may be a reference to the pig with the same name from the anime Hamtaro (though Hamtaro's English dub calls the pig Herbert)

== King's Idea Laboratory Mechas ==
- Robodog No. 1 (ロボドッグ犬1号, Robodoggu-Inu 1-Gō; Robodog-Dog No. 1)

Voiced by: Yuichi Nagashima (Japanese); David Matranga (English)
A rude, incontinent robot that Dr. Eyepatch made to help on some of Milk's missions. Tetsuko and he are bitter rivals. Robodog winds up causing a lot of conflict and trouble on Milk's missions.

- Punishment Missile - A huge, red missile painted with a strange face that is fired at the selected target by the President in order to "punish" the target.
- Submarine Milk 5 - A submarine that is used by Milk Chan to go underwater.
- Rice Cake Maker No. 3 - A rice pounder that is toilet-like in shape. It pounds rice cakes over and over.
- Dokochin 1 No. 4
- Pork Gun No. 5/The Porkcinerator: A laser gun that is used to shoot pigs and sends their bodies into another dimension, except for their legs.
- Mecha Elderly No. 7 ("Furby")/Geezerbot 1000: A robot that is designed to look like an old man. Fueled by ramen, he will suddenly become surly if he hasn't had any. He has no real function. This said to have debuted on The Tonight Show.
- Bear Slayer Robo Willy No. 8/Willy the Bear Slaying Mecha - A robot designed to slay bears unconditionally. On the mission, after one year of searching the bear, Leonardo, he gets destroyed easily by Leonardo the Japanese Bear. His design vaguely resembles Jim Kelly's character in Enter the Dragon.
- Magic Shiitake 1 No. 9/Magic Mushroom 5000: Magic Shiitake is a mushroom shaped device that warps time and space within a given radius so the user doesn't have to make an excuse to get out of whatever he doesn't want to do.

== Theme songs ==
Original

Opening
"Not Really Afraid of Wolves" (狼なんか怖くない, Ōkami Nanka Kowaku Nai)
Lyricist: Yu Aku / Composer: Takuro Yoshida / Singer: Haruka Nakamura
Ending

- "Hoodlum Highschool Rock'nRoll ~ President Version" (ツッパリHighschool Rock'nRoll～大統領編, Tsuppari Highschool Rock'nRoll ~ Daitōryō Hen)

Lyricist: Yoshiyuki Tamiya / Composer: Yoshiyuki Tamiya / Performed by Yūichi Nagashima

Alternate

Opening

- "Disco Milk"

== Episodes ==
=== Super Milk Chan ===
No.	Original title / Americanized title	Original release date
1	"Enter Milk Chan" / "You Play with Fire, You Get Burned" "Miruku Chan Tōjō no Maki" (ミルクちゃん登場の巻)	June 18, 1998
2	"Something Like, a Tokarev" / "The High Price of Fame" "Tokarefu no, Yōna Mono no maki" (トカレフの、ようなものの巻)	June 25, 1998
3	"It's Ecology Milk Chan" / "The Case of the Endangered Species" "Ekorojī da yo Miruku Chan no Maki" (エコロジーだよミルクちゃんの巻)	July 2, 1998
4	"Totally Unexpected Animal Event" / "What the Duck?" "Animaru Kisō Tengai no Maki" (アニマル奇想天外の巻)	July 9, 1998
5	"Milk's Challenger of Fire" / "Don't Play with Fire" "Miruku no Honō no Charenjā no Maki" (ミルクの炎のチャレンジャーの巻)	July 16, 1998
6	"Milk's Appraise Anything Team" / "Have a Knife Day" "Miruku no Nandemo Kantei Tai no Maki" (ミルクのなんでも鑑定隊の巻)	July 23, 1998
7	"Super Milk Chan's Boy Knife" / "The Boy and the Close Shave" "Miruku no Shōnen Naifu no Maki" (ミルクの少年ナイフの巻)	July 30, 1998
8	"Stolen Fighting Spirit" / "Solid Rocky" "Nusumareta Tō Kon no Maki" (盗まれた闘魂の巻)	August 6, 1998
9	"Tomyamkun Illusion" / "The Stink, the Stew...I'm High!" "Tomuyamukun Iryūjon no Maki" (トムヤムクン・イリュージョンの巻)	August 13, 1998
10	"Mice Die 2 Times" / "Of Mice, Men, and Milk" "Nezumi wa Ni-do Shinu no Maki" (ねずみは2度死ぬの巻)	August 20, 1998
11	"The President That Dashes Through Time" / "Time and Time Again" "Toki wo Kakeru Daitōryō no Maki" (時をかける大統領の巻)	August 27, 1998
12	"Tetsuko's Blast of a First Date" / "Hungry for Love" "Tetsuko no Buttobi Hatsu Dēto no Maki" (テツコのブッとび初デートの巻)	September 3, 1998
13	"Hunting Old Men in the Name of Heaven" / "Pretty, Witty, and Gay" "Ten ni Kawatte Oyaji Gari no Maki" (天に代わっておやじがりの巻)	September 10, 1998
14	"Farewell Milk Chan" / "It's Lonely at the Top" "Sayonara Miruku Chan no Maki" (さよならミルクちゃんの巻)	September 17, 1998

=== OH! Super Milk Chan ===
No.	Original title / Americanized title	Original airdate (WOWOW)	Original airdate (Adult Swim)
1	"Milk's Story of The Evil Spirits Go Marching In" "Miruku no Mōja ga Machi ni Yatte Kita no Maki" (ミルクの亡者が街にやって来たの巻)	January 27, 2000	November 7, 2004
A counterfeiter is making money that closely resembles the real thing. Milk is sent to uncover him, and soon discovers his one weakness: Belgian waffles!
2	"Milk's Story of From Gibachan to Dioxin" "Miruku no Giba-chan Kara Daiokishin no Maki" (ミルクのギバちゃんからダイオキシンの巻)	February 3, 2000	November 14, 2004
After dreaming that klansmen try to kill him in a guillotine, the President fires a missile on his own country. He tries to get Milk to do something, but ends up getting sidetracked to the point where the missile ends up hitting a random target - the president himself.
3	"Milk's Story of Don't Give Up! Sumi High Nine" / "The Mysterious Case of the Red Wine Tide Vintage 1961" "Miruku no Makeru na! Sumi Kō Nain no Maki" (ミルクの負けるな！墨校ナインの巻)	February 10, 2000	November 21, 2004
A ship carrying a load of wine sinks in the middle of the ocean. Milk is sent to aid the drunken fish.
4	"Milk's Story of the Return of the Young General from the Planet" / "Gross Encounters of the Worst Kind" "Miruku no Yūsei Kara no Kaettekita Waka Daishō no Maki" (ミルクの遊星からの帰ってきた若大将の巻)	February 17, 2000	November 28, 2004
Aliens, seeking new sources of food, have kidnapped the President. Milk goes out to find him but doesn't know where to start.
5	"Milk's Story of Mochi Stretching and Shrinking it" / "The Games People Play" "Miruku no Mochi ga Nobi tari Chijin dari no Maki" (ミルクのモチがのびたりちぢんだりの巻)	February 24, 2000	December 5, 2004
Milk seeks a way to make a better version of her favorite treat, mochi (rice cakes). Her searches are interrupted when the President orders her to find a missing baby.
6	"Milk's Story of Towering Homeless" / "Homeless is Where the Heart Is" "Miruku no Tawāringu Hōmuresu no Maki" (ミルクのタワーリング・ホームレスの巻)	March 2, 2000	December 12, 2004
After the cardboard houses of the homeless burn down, the President orders Milk to build them new homes.
7	"Milk's Story of Ra-Ra-Raccoon Dog - Heisei Pig Wars Oink-Oink" / "When Pigs Fly" "Miruku no Tan-Tan-Tanuki - Heisei Buta Gassen Bū-Bū no Maki" (ミルクのタンタンたぬき・平成豚合戦ブーブーの巻)	March 9, 2000	January 2, 2005
A mishap involving sexual harassment causes trouble at a pig leg factory. Two pigs in love escape and are now defecting. Milk is ordered to stop them, but she's too busy eating her own snacks.
8	"Milk's Story of Virtual Sound System" / "Sounds Like Your Problem to Me" "Miruku no Bācharu Saundo Shisutemu no Maki" (ミルクのバーチャルサウンドシステムの巻)	March 16, 2000	January 9, 2005
Milk accidentally eats a priceless Tyrannosaurus rex egg, but the President is too busy crying over his lost cat to worry. In order to smooth things over, Milk sets out to find his cat.
9	"Milk's Story of Financial Corrosion Peninsula" / "When Traveling Through Life, Watch Your Baggage" "Miruku no Kinyū Fushoku Hantō no Maki" (ミルクの金融腐蝕半島の巻)	March 23, 2000	January 16, 2005
There's a rash of purse thefts in nursing homes. Milk is sent out, with the aid of an old man robot, to combat it.
10	"Milk's Story of Ho Hokekyo - Which It Is to Die" / "If It Ain't Broke, Just Wait Awhile 'Cuz It Will Be" "Miruku no Hō Hokekyo - Shinu no wa Dotchi da no Maki" (ミルクのホーホケキョ・死ぬのはどっちだの巻)	March 30, 2000	January 23, 2005
Tetsuko breaks down due to the 2000th fart. Before Milk has a chance to fix her, she's sent to combat a killer bear.
11	"Milk's Story of Having a Thick Talk for Dinner" / "If at First You Don't Succeed, Do Another Take" "Miruku no Mattari Tōku Gochi ni Nari Masu no Maki" (ミルクのまったりトーク・ゴチになりますの巻)	April 6, 2000	January 30, 2005
An outtakes episode, hosted by Dr. Eyepatch and a man with three eyes who claims to be the show's creator.
12	"Milk's Story of Farewell Humanity: Last Episode" / "The Day After the Day After Tomorrow...Last Episode" "Miruku no Sayonara Jinrui: Episōdo Saigo no Maki" (ミルクのさよなら人類：エピソード最後の巻)	April 13, 2000	February 6, 2005
Reality is being warped by a machine that resembles a shiitake mushroom. Milk is sent to take care of the problem, but has some trouble as the mushroom's rays keep sending her back in time.
EX	"Milk Shows No Mercy! Marital Affairs are Culture!" "Miruku no Nō Māshī! Furin wa Bunkada! no Maki" (ミルクのノーマーシー！不倫は文化だ！の巻)	TBA	TBA
An extra episode made exclusively for the Grasshoppa! Vol. 2 dvd.

=== Milk's IT Revolution ===
A collection of flash shorts from the shockwave.jp website. This episode was only aired on Anime Network and was released on DVD in Japan. This collection includes shorts such as:

- Everybody's a Picasso Here - A man by the name of Uotake Lupin the Third has been going around creating sculptures out of excrement and the President sends Milk to the care of the issue. The trio stops at King's Idea Laboratory, where they are given the Mecha No. 108 "Johnny" in order to construct a museum for Uotake Lupin to build his sculptures.
- The Reform That Accompanies Milk's Pain - After seeing an advertisement about the latest King's Idea Laboratory Mecha No. 109 "Silicone Vision" (a mecha designed to detect if any person shown on television has had plastic surgery), Milk decides to purchase it. While enjoying their new device, the President informs Milk that a woman named Isabella Kaneko has taken her patron hostage and barricaded herself inside. While the report is shown on the news along with the woman's photo, the Silicone Vision detects that she has had plastic surgery done on her. Milk decides to report this information to the police, who in turn would use it to convince the woman to surrender.
- Interactive According to Milk's Will - When an alien from Planet Kubota sends images of a man saying "I'm sorry, Dad" into peoples' heads, the President orders her to do something about it. The alien is arrested for his crimes. Later, while Milk and Tetsuko are eating sausages, the aliens decides to travel to earth, only to be arrested again.
- Milk's Fight, Hoshino; Virtual Rain of Fists - While Milk and Tetsuko browse the internet and talk about pop culture, the President calls to report news about a watermelon thief.
- Milk's Sense of Virtue as a Celebrity - The president calls to tell Milk that the sense of virtue in young women has been on the decline. To assist them on their mission, the gang head to the King's Idea Laboratory, where they are given Mecha No. 103 "Nadeshiko Panties", which are designed to stay attached onto underaged girls until they turn 18.
- Milk's Sound of Rain is Lupin's Melody -

== ADV Films story arcs ==
The multi-episode story arcs are exclusive to the Americanized English dub by ADV, involving the crew of said dub company in bizarre situations.

=== 100% Whole ===
Marcy Bannor introduces the cast and crew of the Milk Chan dub; Tommy Drake dresses up in drag for a replaced scene.

=== Milk Shake ===
After a plasma TV is stolen from the break room, the ADV Films building has an automated lockdown drill. However, a blackout leaves everyone locked in separate rooms.

=== Cryin' Over Spilled Milk ===
Chris Borque loses the sound effects for Episode 8, leading the cast to perform them themselves. Meanwhile, Marcy is given Ectasy instead of aspirin.

=== Milk & Kookies ===
The ADV cast and crew go to an anime convention, where Ben Pronsky is stalked by a fan.

== TV segments ==
List of in-universe television programs seen throughout the series:

- Tama & Chuutaro/Mousey and Kitty
- Mr. Deserted Island/Deserted Island
- The Four Tire Brothers
- Pastel Mr. Shin/Colorful Mr. Shin
- Police of the North Star/Fist of South Star
- Hirosue's Rush Into Poor People's Dinner
- Company NOW/Dollars & Cents NOW
- Technology Today!

Preceded by Ima, Soko Ni Iru Boku (10/14/1999 - 1/20/2000)	Space Shower TV Thursday 19:00 Timeframe OH! Super Milk Chan (January 27, 2000 – March 30, 2000)	Succeeded by Latest Cinema Jack
Preceded by The Three-Eyed One	Space Shower TV Thursday 18:30 Timeframe OH! Super Milk Chan (April 6, 2000 - April 13, 2000)	Succeeded by Ayashi no Ceres (4/20/2000 - 9/28/2000)
