= Dolly Parton filmography =

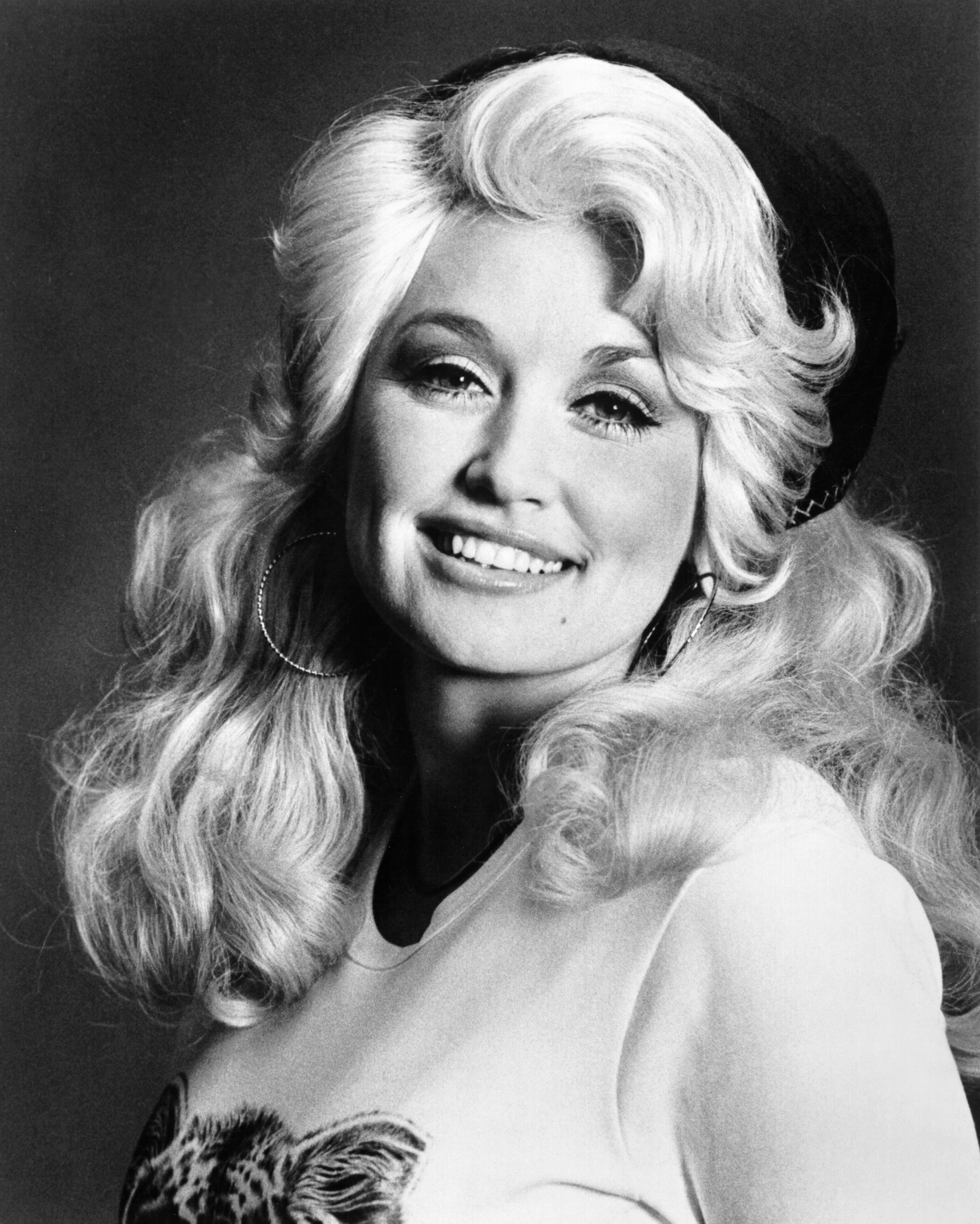
Parton in 1970

Dolly Parton was an American country singer, songwriter and actress. She appeared in 12 theatrically released films and made over 400 appearances on television.

Parton's first televised appearance was in 1956 on the Cas Walker Farm and Home Hour when she was 10 years old; she had previously appeared on Cas Walker's radio show. Her major television breakthrough came in 1967 when she was discovered by Porter Wagoner who had her join his weekly variety show, The Porter Wagoner Show. Parton appeared on 218 episodes of the show between 1967 and 1975 as a regular performer. Appearing on the show with Wagoner during this time is credited with helping to boost Parton to superstardom.

Following her departure from Wagoner's weekly show, Parton transitioned into a more pop-oriented musical style in 1976 and 1977. During this time Parton starred in her own variety show Dolly!, which ran for one season. Parton's popularity exploded following a string of appearances on The Tonight Show with Johnny Carson beginning in 1977, and she went on to be prominently featured in numerous television specials, including ones headlined by Mac Davis and Cher, with whom she shared manager Sandy Gallin.

In 1980, Parton made her theatrical film debut as Doralee Rhodes in 9 to 5. She wrote the film's theme song, which was nominated for an Academy Award and a Grammy. In 1982, Parton appeared in The Best Little Whorehouse in Texas as Mona Stangley. She contributed two additional songs to the film's score, "Sneakin' Around" and "I Will Always Love You". The film and Parton herself were nominated for Golden Globes for Best Motion Picture (Comedy or Musical) and Best Actress in a Motion Picture (Comedy or Musical), respectively. In 1984, Parton starred in Rhinestone with Sylvester Stallone. The film was panned upon its release, and is generally regarded as a commercial and critical flop. However, the soundtrack yielded two top 10 hits for Parton, "Tennessee Homesick Blues" and "God Won't Get You".

Parton starred in the Christmas television special Kenny & Dolly: A Christmas to Remember with Kenny Rogers in 1984 to promote their collaborative Christmas album Once Upon a Christmas. In 1986, Parton starred in the made-for-television film A Smoky Mountain Christmas. During the 1987–1988 television season, Parton attempted a second variety show on ABC, also titled Dolly. Like the previous series, this one also only lasted one season.

Parton starred in the 1989 film Steel Magnolias with Sally Field, Shirley MacLaine,Julia Roberts, Daryl Hannah and Olympia Dukakis.

In 1991, Parton starred in the made-for-television film Wild Texas Wind.

Parton returned to the silver screen in 1992 with James Woods in the 1992 film Straight Talk. The film received mixed reviews, with most of the praise going to Parton and Woods' performances, while criticizing the storyline. In 1993, she made a cameo appearance in The Beverly Hillbillies.

In 1994, Parton starred in two pilot episodes for sitcoms, Heavens to Betsy, and Mindin' My Own Business, neither of which were ordered to series. Parton starred in the made-for-television films Unlikely Angel in 1996 and Blue Valley Songbird in 1999.

In the 2000s, Parton made appearances in the films Frank McKlusky, C.I. and Miss Congeniality 2: Armed and Fabulous as well as television appearances on Reba and Hannah Montana.

Parton starred in the 2012 film Joyful Noise with Queen Latifah, Keke Palmer and Jeremy Jordan. She also made cameo appearances in The Year Dolly Parton Was My Mom in 2011 and Hollywood to Dollywood in 2012.

In 2015, Parton and NBC produced the made-for-television film Dolly Parton's Coat of Many Colors featuring Parton as narrator. A sequel, Dolly Parton's Christmas of Many Colors: Circle of Love was produced in 2016, again featuring Parton as narrator and in a cameo appearance as the Painted Lady who inspired her signature style.

Parton and Netflix partnered together to produce a series of television films based on Parton's songs, titled Dolly Parton's Heartstrings. It was released in 2019.

== Film ==
| Year | Title | Role | Notes | Ref. |
|---|---|---|---|---|
| 1980 | 9 to 5 | Doralee Rhodes | Film debut | |
| 1982 | The Best Little Whorehouse in Texas | Mona Stangley | | |
| 1984 | Rhinestone | Jake Farris | | |
| 1989 | Steel Magnolias | Truvy Jones | | |
| 1992 | Straight Talk | Shirlee Kenyon | | |
| 1993 | The Beverly Hillbillies | Herself | Cameo appearance | |
| 2002 | Frank McKlusky, C.I. | Edith McKlusky | | |
| 2005 | Miss Congeniality 2: Armed and Fabulous | Herself | Cameo appearance | |
| 2011 | Gnomeo & Juliet | Dolly Gnome | Voice cameo | |
| 2011 | The Year Dolly Parton Was My Mom | Herself | Voice cameo | |
| 2012 | Joyful Noise | G.G. Sparrow | Final feature film | |
| 2012 | Hollywood to Dollywood | Herself | Cameo appearance | |

== Television ==
| Year | Title | Role | Notes | Ref. |
|---|---|---|---|---|
| 1956–1964 | Cas Walker Farm and Home Hour | Herself | | |
| 1964 | The Early Morning Show | Herself | | |
| 1967 | The Ralph Emery Early Morning Show | Herself | | |
| 1967 | Music City USA | Herself | Guest performer | |
| 1967, 1973 | The Wilburn Brothers Show | Herself | Guest performer | |
| 1967–1974 | The Porter Wagoner Show | Herself | Main role | |
| 1968–1970 | The Kraft Music Hall | Herself | "2nd Annual Country Music Association Awards" "3rd Annual Country Music Association Awards" "4th Annual Country Music Association Awards" | |
| 1969 | An Old-Time Country Christmas | Herself | Television special | |
| 1970 | The Nashville Sound | Herself | Documentary | |
| 1970; 1972; 1975 | Hee Haw | Herself | Musical guest, 3 episodes | |
| 1970; 1974; 1977 | The Mike Douglas Show | Herself | Country vocalist, 1 episode Guest, 1 episode Co-host, 5 episodes | |
| 1971 | The David Frost Show | Herself | | |
| 1971 | That Good Ole Nashville Music | Herself | Guest performer | |
| 1973 | The Rowan and Martin Special | Herself | Television special | |
| 1973 | RCA's Opening Night | Herself | Television special | |
| 1973 | Burt Reynolds' Late Show | Herself | Television special | |
| 1974 | Dinah's Place | Herself | | |
| 1974 | 8th Annual Country Music Association Awards | Herself | Television special; performer – nominated for Female Vocalist of the Year and Vocal Duo of the Year | |
| 1975 | In Concert | Herself | Performer (this episode was issued on LP in 1975) | |
| 1975 | Sing Country 1975 | Herself | Television special; performer | |
| 1975 | 9th Annual Country Music Association Awards | Herself | Television special; performer – won Female Vocalist of the Year and nominated for Vocal Duo of the Year | |
| 1975 | The Ronnie Prophet Show | Herself | Guest performer | |
| 1975 | Candid Camera | Herself | 2 episodes | |
| 1975 | Grand Ole Opry 50th Anniversary | Herself | Television special | |
| 1976 | Dinah! | Herself | Guest performer | |
| 1976 | Festival of Entertainment | Herself | Television special | |
| 1976 | Sing Country 1976 | Herself | Television special; performer | |
| 1976 | The Mac Davis Show | Herself | 1 episode | |
| 1976 | 10th Annual Country Music Association Awards | Herself | Television special; performer – won Female Vocalist of the Year and nominated for Vocal Duo of the Year | |
| 1976–1977 | Dolly! | Herself | Host, also performer | |
| 1976, 1978 | The Hollywood Squares | Herself | Panelist, 6 episodes | |
| 1977 | The 4th Annual American Music Awards | Herself | Television special; nominated for Favorite Country Female Artist | |
| 1977 | The 19th Annual Grammy Awards | Herself | Television special; nominated for Best Country Vocal Performance, Female ("All I Can Do") | |
| 1977 | Captain Kangaroo | Herself | | |
| 1977 | Mac Davis: Sounds Like Home | Herself | Television special | |
| 1977 | Musikladen | Herself | | |
| 1978 | Cher... Special | Herself | Television special | |
| 1978 | 50 Years of Country Music | Herself | Television special; host | |
| 1979 | Dolly & Carol in Nashville | Herself / Trudy | Television special | |
| 1979 | The Seventies: An Explosion of Country Music | Herself | Performer; later repackaged as Country Superstars of the '70s | |
| 1979 | A Christmas Special... With Love, Mac Davis | Herself | Television special | |
| 1980 | Barbara Mandrell & the Mandrell Sisters | Herself | Episode: Pilote | |
| 1980 | Mac Davis 10th Anniversary Special: I Still Believe in Music | Herself | Television special | |
| 1981 | Lily: Sold Out | Herself | Special | |
| 1983 | Alvin and the Chipmunks | Herself | Voice role; episode: "Urban Chipmunk" | |
| 1984 | Kenny & Dolly: A Christmas to Remember | Herself | Television special (a "Making of" special was also released) | |
| 1985 | Kenny & Dolly: Real Love | Herself | Television special; promotional title: Kenny Rogers and Dolly Parton: Together | |
| 1985 | The Winning Hand | Herself | Television special | |
| 1986 | A Smoky Mountain Christmas | Lorna Davis | Television film | |
| 1987–1988 | Dolly | Herself | Host, also performer | |
| 1988 | Bob Hope's Jolly Christmas Show | Herself | Television special | |
| 1989 | Saturday Night Live | Herself / various | Host, also musical guest | |
| 1989 | Kenny, Dolly and Willie: Something Inside So Strong | Herself | Television special | |
| 1990 | Designing Women | Herself | 2 episodes | |
| 1990 | Dolly Parton: Christmas at Home | Herself | Television special | |
| 1991 | Babes | Herself | Episode: "Hello Dolly" | |
| 1991 | Wild Texas Wind | Thiola "Big T" Rayfield | Television film | |
| 1994 | Heavens to Betsy | Betsy Baxter | Unaired TV pilot | |
| 1994 | Mindin' My Own Business | Catering business owner | Unaired TV pilot | |
| 1995 | Big Dreams and Broken Hearts: The Dottie West Story | Herself | Television film; cameo appearance | |
| 1995 | Naomi & Wynonna: Love Can Build a Bridge | Herself | Television film | |
| 1996 | Unlikely Angel | Ruby Diamond | Television film | |
| 1996 | Dolly Parton: Treasures | Self | Television special | |
| 1996 | The Magic School Bus | Katrina Eloise "Murph" Murphy | Episode: "Holiday Special" | |
| 1997 | Get to the Heart: The Barbara Mandrell Story | Herself | Television film; cameo appearance | |
| 1999 | The Simpsons | Herself | Voice role; episode: "Sunday, Cruddy Sunday" | |
| 1999 | Jackie's Back | Herself | Television film; cameo appearance | |
| 1999 | Blue Valley Songbird | Leanna Taylor | Television film | |
| 2000 | Bette | Herself | Episode: "Halloween" | |
| 2005 | Reba | Dolly Majors | "Reba's Rules of Real Estate" | |
| 2006; 2007; 2010 | Hannah Montana | Aunt Dolly | 3 episodes | |
| 2009 | 17 Kids and Counting | Herself | "Duggars in Dixie"; "Duggars Meet Dolly" | |
| 2010 | Dolly Celebrates 25 Years of Dollywood | Herself | | |
| 2011 | Strictly Come Dancing | Singer | "Launch Show"; singing "Together You and I" | |
| 2012 | The Bachelorette | Herself | 1 episode | |
| 2013 | A Country Christmas Story | Herself | Television film | |
| 2013 | Kenny & Dolly: An Intimate Conversation | Herself | | |
| 2015 | Dolly Parton's Coat of Many Colors | Herself | Television film; narrator; also executive producer | |
| 2016 | Dolly Parton's Christmas of Many Colors: Circle of Love | Herself / The Painted Lady | Television film; narrator; also executive producer | |
| 2018 | Dolly & Friends: The Making of a Soundtrack | Herself | Television special; making of the Dumplin' soundtrack album | |
| 2019 | Country Music | Herself | Directed by Ken Burns; interviewed in all eight episodes | |
| 2019 | Dolly Parton's Heartstrings | Various roles | 8 episodes | |
| 2019 | Christmas at Dollywood | Herself | Television film (Hallmark) | |
| 2020 | CMT Giants: Kenny Rogers | Herself | Performer (performed: "Sweet Music Man") | |
| 2020 | Biography: Dolly Parton | Herself | Aired as Dolly Parton: Here I Am in the UK and on Netflix | |
| 2020 | Biography: Kenny Rogers | Herself | | |
| 2020 | Dolly Parton's Christmas on the Square | Angel | Television film (Netflix) | |
| 2020 | A Holly Dolly Christmas | Herself | Television special (CBS) | |
| 2022 | Grace & Frankie | Agnes | Episode: "The Beginning" | |
| 2022 | The Orville | Simulation of herself | Episode: "Midnight Blue" | |
| 2022 | Dolly Parton's Mountain Magic Christmas | Herself | Television film; also executive producer | |
| 2022 | Miley’s New Year’s Eve Party | Herself | Television special (NBC) | |
| 2022 | Dolly Parton at the BBC | Herself | A selection of Dolly Parton's live music performances at the BBC. | |
| 2023 | Call Me Kat | Herself | Episode: "Call Me Philliam" | |
