= Vörös =

Vörös is a Hungarian surname from a nickname meaning "red" in Hungarian. Notable people with the surname include:

- Aaron Voros (born 1981), Canadian ice hockey player
- Chris and Patrick Vörös (born 1993), Hungarian-Canadian identical twins; wrestlers, TikTokers
- Christina Alexandra Voros (born 1977), American director and cinematographer
- Ferenc Vörös (born 1922), Hungarian Olympic swimmer
- János Vörös (1891–1968), Hungarian military officer and politician
- Péter Vörös (born 1977), Hungarian football player
- Virág Vörös (born 1999), Hungarian ski jumper
- Zsuzsanna Vörös (born 1977), Hungarian Olympic modern pentathlete

in Czech/Slovak transcription

- Andrea Verešová (born 1980), Slovak model

== See also ==
- Voros (disambiguation)
