= Carlson twins =

American twin male models

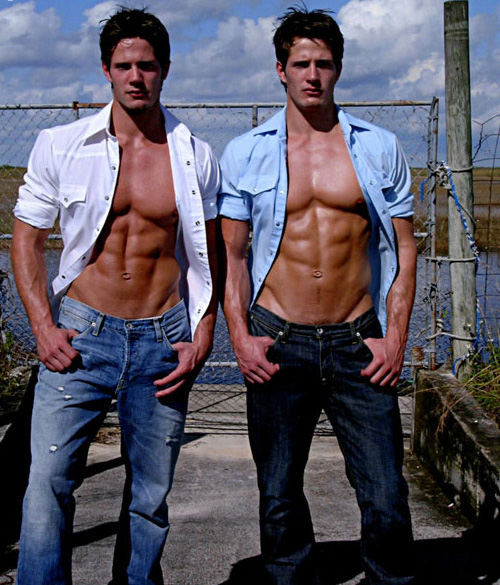
- Born: December 24, 1978 (age 47); Stillwater, Minnesota, U.S.
- Spouse: Jessica Hall (Kyle)
- Modeling information
- Height: 6 ft 0 in (183 cm)
- Hair color: Brown
- Eye color: Blue

Kyle and Lane Carlson (born December 24, 1978) are American identical twin brothers known as the Carlson twins. They work together as male fashion models.

== Biography ==
The twins were born in Stillwater, Minnesota, Kyle six minutes after Lane. The Carlson twins grew up with three siblings. Their mother Judy was a nursing assistant, and their father Rick owned a construction company. The brothers attended Stillwater High School, and both graduated from Winona State University, majoring in business. Kyle married model Jessica Hall in 2008, and they had a daughter in 2014.

== Career ==
The brothers began their modeling career when Lane was spotted in a mall in La Crosse, Wisconsin, and they then met with fashion scouts in January 2000 in Minneapolis. Their agent was David Love from Elite Model Management in Chicago. The twins then became internationally successful models, and they quickly became gay icons due to the often homoerotic imagery of their photoshoots, despite both being heterosexual. As with the Brewer twins, the Carlson twins first received public attention after modeling naked for photographer Bruce Weber.

The Carlson twins have worked for Armani, Out magazine, and Abercrombie and Fitch, with the popularity of the twins increasing after they appeared together in Abercrombie and Fitch's now discontinued catalog, A&F Quarterly (Spring Break 2001). At the peak of their careers, the Carlson twins frequently worked as underwear models, with Calvin Klein reputedly preferring Kyle to front the company's underwear campaigns.

In 2002, Lane appeared as a contestant on NBC's Fear Factor; although he made it to the final round of the series, he did not win. In 2005, the Carlson twins appeared on the WB Television Network's comedy program, Mobile Home Disaster. In 2007, Kyle was regularly featured on the HGTV program, Deserving Design, with Vern Yip. Kyle's primary role on the program involved carpentry. Lane is the executive director of Sunflower Children, which he founded with Helena Houdová, and in 2010 he promoted awareness of autism at a charity event, Sea Paddle NYC.

== See also ==
- Lane twins
- Brewer twins
- List of twins
