= ECCW Tag Team Championship =

Professional wrestling tag team championship

Details
- Promotion: Elite Canadian Championship Wrestling
- Date established: August 1996
- Date retired: N/A N/A, 2020
Statistics
- First champion: The Glamour Order of Disicipline
- Final champions: The Vörös Twins (Chris and Patrick Vörös)
- Most reigns: Glamour Order of Disicipline (7 reigns, by team), Scott Mac (9 reigns, by individual)
- Longest reign: Models Inc. (Memphis and MR2) (1 year, 5 months, 4 days)
- Shortest reign: Dr. Luther and Juggernaut High, 5in' White Boys, Michael Sweetser and Scotty Mac (<1 day)

The NWA/ECCW Tag Team Championship is the tag team title for the Elite Canadian Championship Wrestling wrestling promotion based out of British Columbia. It was activated in 1996. The first champions were the Glamour Order Of Discipline. There have been 74 reigns by 34 teams and 55 wrestlers with three vacancies. One of the vacancies came when the titles were vacated by NWA Pacific Northwest representative Mike Sweetster after ruling that the 24 July 2009 match was not an official contest and was thus null and void. The titles are currently being held by Bishy Wishy (Bishop and Fergie) who are in their first reign. On 19 April 2013, ECCW unveiled new belts for the Elite Tag Team Championships. Then champions Scotty Mac and Jamie Diaz relinquished the old NWA/ECCW Tag Team Championships to their stable mates The Greedfather and Red Dinero to have, who later deemed them the "ECCW Classic Tag Team Championships".

== Title history ==
Key
| No. | Overall reign number |
| Reign | Reign number for the specific champion |
| Days | Number of days held |
| + | Current reign is changing daily |

| No. | Champion | Championship change | | | Reign statistics | | Notes | Ref. |
| No. | Champion | Date | Event | Location | Reign | Days | Notes | Ref. |
|---|---|---|---|---|---|---|---|---|
Extreme Canadian Championship Wrestling (ECCW), National Wrestling Alliance (NWA) and Elite Canadian Championship Wrestling (ECCW)
| 1 | Glamour Order of Disicipline (Michelle Starr and Johnny Canuck) | August, 1996 | House show | New Westminster, BC | 1 | | Defeated Doink the Clown and Ole Olson to become the first champions. | |
| 2 | Brains, Brawn and Class (BBC) (Mike Roselli and Randy Tyler) | August 1996 | House show | Campbell River, BC | 1 | | | |
| 3 | Army of Darkness (Dr. Luther and Incubus) | 12 December 1997 | House show | New Westminster, BC | 1 | | | |
| The titles are held up in January 1998. | | | | | | | | |
| 3 | Army of Darkness (Dr. Luther and Incubus) | 20 February 1998 | House show | New Westminster, BC | 2 | 150 | Luther and Incubus win a tournament to determine the new champions. | |
| 4 | Glamour Order of Disicipline (Michelle Starr and Johnny Canuck) | 20 July 1998 | House show | Surrey BC | 2 | 39 | GOD defeat the New Moondogs and the Portland Connection in a triangle match after Army of Darkness no-shows the event. | |
| 5 | Dog Pound Order (Moondog Mason and Moondog Chopps) | 28 August 1998 | House show | New Westminster, BC | 1 | 31 | | |
| 6 | Glamour Order of Disicipline (Michelle Starr and Johnny Canuck) | 28 September 1998 | House show | New Westminster, BC | 3 | 116 | | |
| 7 | Dog Pound Order (Moondog Mason and Moondog Chopps) | 22 January 1999 | House show | Nanaimo, BC | 2 | 35 | | |
| 8 | Glamour Order of Disicipline (Michelle Starr and Johnny Canuck) | 26 February 1999 | House show | New Westminster, BC | 4 | 28 | | |
| 9 | Toxic Insanity (Biohazard and Juggernaut) | 26 March 1999 | House show | New Westminster, BC | 1 | 241 | | |
| Toxic Insanity was stripped of the titles in August, 1999 | | | | | | | | |
| 10 | Player's Club (Chance Beckett and Steve Rizzono) | 12 November 1999 | House show | New Westminster, BC | 1 | 14 | Player's Club defeats Brains, Brawn and Class in the final of a tournament to determine new champions. | |
| 11 | Glamour Order of Disicipline (Michelle Starr and Johnny Canuck) | 26 November 1999 | House show | New Westminster, BC | 5 | 126 | | |
| 12 | Dr. Luther^{(3)} and Juggernaut^{(2)} | 31 March 2000 | House show | New Westminster, BC | 1 | 0 | | |
| 13 | High 5in' White Boys (Chance Beckett^{(2)} and Havoc) | 31 March 2000 | House show | New Westminster, BC | 1 | 0 | | |
| 14 | Glamour Order of Disicipline (Michelle Starr and Johnny Canuck) | 31 March 2000 | House show | New Westminster, BC | 6 | 168 | | |
| 14 | Ladies Choice and Layne Fontaine | 15 September 2000 | House show | New Westminster, BC | 1 | 224 | Layne Fontaine gave up the Tag Team Championship when he said he could not contact Ladies Choice. Ladies Choice attacked him early in the show leading to a grudge match. | |
| 15 | Backwoods Militia (Major Hardway and R.A.G.E.) | 27 April 2001 | House show | Surrey, BC | 1 | 154 | Backwoods Militia defeated Chance Beckett and Rockford 2001 in the final of a tournament to determine new champions. | |
| 16 | Scotty Mac and Havoc^{(2)} | 28 September 2001 | House show | Surrey, BC | 1 | 140 | | |
| 17 | Backwoods Militia (Major Hardway and R.A.G.E.) | 15 February 2002 | House show | Surrey, BC | 2 | 121 | | |
| 18 | Glamour Order of Disicipline (Michelle Starr and Johnny Canuck) | 16 June 2002 | House show | Vancouver, BC | 7 | 39 | | |
| 19 | Jungle Fever (Abbadon and Gorilla) | 25 July 2002 | House show | Surrey, BC | 1 | 92 | | |
| 20 | Club International (Skag Rollins and Seth Knight) | 25 October 2002 | House show | Surrey, BC | 1 | 63 | | |
| 21 | Larry Blackwell and James Watkins | 27 December 2002 | APW Live Event | Hayward, CA | 1 | 1 | The title change took place at an All Pro Wrestling event. | |
| 22 | Club International (Skag Rollins and Seth Knight) | 28 December 2002 | APW Kristmas Kaos | Hayward, CA | 2 | 181 | | |
| 23 | Jungle Fever (Abbadon and Gorilla<) | 27 June 2003 | House show | Surrey, BC | 2 | 91 | | |
| 24 | Models Inc. (Memphis and MR2) | 26 September 2003 | House show | Surrey, BC | 1 | 518 | | |
| 25 | Hot and Bothered (Cole Bishop and Kurt Sterling) | 25 February 2005 | House show | Surrey, BC | 1 | 113 | | |
| 26 | Team Italia (Mike Roselli and Fabulous Fabio) | 18 June 2005 | House show | Vancouver, BC | 1 | 160 | | |
| Team Italia was stripped of the titles on 4 November 2005 due to not being able to defend the titles. | | | | | | | | |
| 27 | Hot and Bothered (Cole Bishop and Kurt Sterling) | 25 November 2005 | House show | | 2 | Surrey, BC | | |
| Hot and Bothered decide to vacate the titles. | | | | | | | | |
| 28 | Chill Town; Scotty Mac^{(2)} and DK Roc | 20 January 2006 | House show | Vancouver, BC | 1 | 64 | The title is held up pending a rematch by Commissioner Terry Joe Silverspoon after a match between Scotty Mac and DK Roc and SCUM due to outside interference by Machette Brown. | |
| 29 | Chill Town; Scotty Mac^{(3)} and DK Roc^{(2)} | 25 March 2006 | House show | Vancouver, BC | 2 | 6 | Scotty Mac defeats Wrathchild in a TLC match to win the vacant titles for himself and DK Roc. | |
| 30 | SCUM (Wrathchild and Killswitch) | 31 March 2006 | House show | Surrey, BC | 1 | 148 | | |
| 31 | Chill Town' (Scotty Mac^{(4)} and Dropkick Murphy) | 26 August 2006 | House show | Surrey, BC | 1 | 62 | | |
| 32 | The Demon's Rejects (Cremator and Abbadon^{(3)}) | 27 October 2006 | House show | Surrey, BC | 1 | 91 | | |
| 33 | Chill Town (Scotty Mac^{(5)} and Dropkick Murphy^{(2)}) | 26 January 2007 | House show | Surrey, BC | 2 | 99 | Chill Town defeated Cremator in a handicap match. | |
| 34 | Masked Dudes of Doom (El Phantasmo and Halo) | 5 May 2007 | House show | Vancouver, BC | 1 | 83 | Phantasmo and Halo defeated Chill Town and Memphis and Tony Kozina in a TLC match. | |
| 35 | Greatness on Demand (Michelle Starr^{(8)} and Disco Fury) | 27 July 2007 | House show | Surrey, BC | 1 | 123 | Starr, Disco and Johnny Canuck defeated Masked Dudes of Doom and Moondog Manson in a six-man street fight where the titles was on the line. | |
| 36 | Models Inc. (Memphis and MR2) | 27 November 2007 | House show | Surrey, BC | 2 | 67 | | |
| 37 | SuperFunk (Fast Freddy Funk and VK) | 2 February 2008 | House show | Vancouver, BC | 1 | 174 | | |
| 38 | Chill Town (Sid Sylum and Dropkick Murphy^{(3)}) | 25 July 2008 | House show | Surrey, BC | 1 | 71 | Chill Town defeated SuperFunk and the Bollywood Lions in triple threat tag team match. | |
| 39 | "The Loose Cannon" Kenny Lush and "Bomber" Nelson Creed | 4 October 2008 | House show | Vancouver, BC | 1 | 174 | | |
| 40 | Pop Culture (Ice and Cole Bishop^{(3)}) | 27 March 2009 | House show | Surrey, BC | 1 | 119 | | |
| 42 | Sid Sylum^{(2)} and Azeem the Dream | 24 July 2009 | House show | Surrey, BC | 1 | 39 | This was a three-way elimination match also featuring Scotty Mac and Dropkick Murphy, although Dropkick was attacked before the match and Scotty Mac was forced to compete on his own. | |
| – | Vacated | 1 August 2009 | | Vancouver, BC | | 463 | The titles were vacated by NWA Pacific Northwest representative Mike Sweetster after ruling that the 24 July 2009 match was not an official contest and was thus null and void. | |
| 43 | "The Loose Cannon" Kenny Lush^{(2)} and Billy Suede | 7 November 2009 | House show | Vancouver, BC | 1 | 28 | Lush and Suede won an 8-team tournament to win the vacant titles. | |
| 44 | Egos and Icons (Nick Price, Jamie Diaz and Tony Baroni) | 5 December 2009 | House show | Vancouver, BC | 1 | 202 | | |
| 45 | Memphis^{(3)} and Pete Powers | 25 June 2010 | House show | Surrey, BC | 1 | 78 | | |
| – | Vacated | 11 September 2010 | | Vancouver, BC | | 48 | The titles were vacated by ECCW Commissioner Bill Coltrane after Memphis suffered a long-term injury. A subsequent title match between Bishop and Azeem The Dream vs. Pete Powers and El Phantasmo ended in a disqualification. | |
| 46 | Church of the Divine Prophecy (The Divine Prophet and Artemis Spencer^{(2)}) | 29 October 2010 | House show | Vancouver, BC | 1 | 71 | The vacant titles were won in a three-way tag match that also featured the Bollywood Lions and the team of Alex Plexis and Billy Suede. Spencer first won the tag titles as the masked Halo. | |
| 47 | The Cremator^{(2)} and Danni Deeds | 8 January 2011 | House show | Vancouver, BC | 1 | 69 | | |
| 48 | Bollywood Lions (Harv and Gurv Sihra) | 18 March 2011 | Quest for the Gold | Surrey, BC | 1 | 253 | This match was a triple threat which also included Rick the Weapon X and El Phantasmo. | |
| 49 | Air Pirates/Riot (Alex Plexis, "Ravenous" Randy Myers, Nicole Matthews, and Andy "The Dreadful" Bird) | 26 November 2011 | Wrestling with Hunger | Port Coquitlam, BC | 1 | 112 | Plexis and Myers originally won the belts. After the formation of The Riot with Nicole Matthews, and Andy "The Dreadful" Bird on 28 January 2012, Plexis and Randy announced that any two members of the group could defend the title via the Freebird Rule. | |
| 50 | The Administration (Scotty Mac^{(6)} and Michael Sweetser) | 17 March 2012 | House show | Aldergrove, BC | 1 | 0 | Scotty and Sweetser defeated Alex Plexis and Andy The Dreadful Bird. | |
| 51 | Riot (Alex Plexis, "Ravenous" Randy Myers, Nicole Matthews, and Andy "The Dreadful" Bird) | 17 March 2012 | House show | Aldergrove, BC | 2 | 70 | Ravenous Randy and Andy The Dreadful Bird defeated The Administration; all four members of the Riot continue to defend the belts. | |
| 52 | The Administration (Scotty Mac^{(7)} and Jamie Diaz^{(2)}) | 26 May 2012 | Sweet 16 Night 2 | Surrey, BC | 1 | 154 | | |
| 53 | Riot (Alex Plexis, "Ravenous" Randy Myers, Nicole Matthews, and Andy "The Dreadful" Bird) | 27 October 2012 | Halloween Hell | New Westminster, BC | 3 | 133 | Riot won the titles in a Chamber of Extreme Fans Bring The Weapons match. | |
| 54 | The Administration (Scotty Mac^{(8)} and Jamie Diaz^{(3)}) | 9 March 2013 | Pacific Cup 2013 | Vancouver, BC | 2 | 63 | The Administration (Jamie Diaz and Scotty Mac) defeatrf Sid Sylum and The King of the Yukon, The Administration (Jordie Taylor and Red DeNero), The Bollywood Boyz (Gurv Sihra and Harv Sihra), and The Riot (Alex Plexis and Ravenous Randy) in a five team gauntlet match. | |
| 55 | The Bollywood Boyz (Harv Sihra and Gurv Sihra) | 11 May 2013 | 17th Anniversary Show | Vancouver, BC | 2 | 69 | Bollywood Boyz won the titles in a lumberjack match. | |
| 56 | The Amerikan Guns (Mike Santiago and Ethan H. D.) | 19 July 2013 | House show | Surrey, BC | 1 | 106 | | |
| 57 | The Bollywood Boyz (Harv Sihra and Gurv Sihra) | 2 November 2013 | Day of the Dead | Vancouver, BC | 3 | 77 | | |
| 58 | The Amerikan Guns (Mike Santiago and Ethan H. D.) | 18 January 2014 | Ballroom Brawl | Vancouver, BC | 2 | 84 | The American Guns defeated Bollywood Boyz and The Riot in a three-way tag team match. | |
| 59 | The Bollywood Boyz (Harv Sihra and Gurv Sihra) | 12 April 2014 | Seek and Destroy | Vancouver, BC | 4 | 133 | Steel Cage match. | |
| 60 | DTA (Jordie Taylor and Daniel Adonis) | 23 August 2014 | All or Nothing | Vancouver, BC | 1 | 103 | | |
| 61 | The Cunninghams (Karl Cunningham and Jack Cunningham) | 4 December 2014 | Payoff | Vancouver, BC | 1 | 219 | The Cunninghams defeated the DTA, House of Hell, and Scotty Mac and Shreddz in a four-way elimination match. | |
| 62 | The Bollywood Boyz (Harv Sihra and Gurv Sihra) | 11 July 2015 | Ballroom Brawl 4 | Vancouver, BC | 5 | 119 | | |
| 63 | The West Coast Express (Nelson Creed^{(2)} and Alex Plexis^{(4)}) | 7 November 2015 | North by Northwest Tag Team Tournament | Vancouver, BC | 1 | 189 | The West Coast Express defeated the Bollywood Boyz in the first round of the North by Northwest Tag Team Tournament. | |
| 64 | The Good Brothers (Nick Pesky and Mike Everett) | 14 May 2016 | Redemption 2016 | Vancouver, BC | 1 | 91 | | |
| 65 | The Wisemen ("Beautiful" Billy Suede^{(2)} and Tony Baroni^{(2)}) | 13 August 2016 | Civil War | Vancouver, BC | 1 | 154 | The Wiseman defeated The West Coast Express and The Bowling Club (Jonny Flynn and Lucky Strike Flynn) in a three-way tag team match. | |
| 66 | The Good Brothers (Nick Pesky and Mike Everett) | 14 January 2017 | Ballroom Brawl VII | Vancouver, BC | 2 | 7 | | |
| 67 | The Cunninghams (Karl Cunningham and Jack Cunningham) | 21 January 2017 | | New Westminster, BC | 2 | 21 | | |
| 68 | Repaired (Dr. Luther^{(4)} and Randy Myers^{(4)}) | 11 February 2017 | Winter Fair | Abbotsford, British Columbia | 1 | 105 | | |
| 69 | Beauty and The Builds (Scotty Mac^{(9)} and Christina Von Eerie) | 27 May 2017 | 21st Anniversary | New Westminster, BC | 1 | 77 | Best two out of three tables match. | |
| 70 | The Vörös Twins (Chris and Patrick Vörös) | 12 August 2017 | HD Rising | New Westminster, BC | 1 | 161 | | |
| 71 | Bishy Wishy (Bishop^{(4)} and Fergie) | 20 January 2018 | Ballroom Brawl IX | Vancouver, BC | 1 | 84 | | |
| 72 | The Wisemen (Billy Suede^{(3)} and Travis Williams) | 14 April 2018 | | | 1 | 273 | | |
| 72 | Grindhouse (Ashley Sixx and Cat Power) | 1 January 2019 | ECCW Ballroom Brawl E11even - Night 2 | Vancouver, BC | 1 | 217 | | |
| – | Vacated | 26 October 2019 | | | 0 | | | |
| 73 | GODS (Bishop^{(5)} and Sid Sylum ^{(3)} | 26 October 2019 | ECCW Halloween Hell 2019 | New Westminster, BC | 1 | 83 | Defeated 4 Minutes of Heat (Eddie Pearl and Ricky Gibson), Gross Misconduct (Drexel and Steve West) and State of Emergency (Matt Bronson and Sebastian Wolfe) in a Four Way Elimination Match | |
| 74 | Vörös Twins (Chris and Patrick Vörös) | 17 January 2020 | ECCW Ballroom Brawl 13 - Night 1 | Vancouver, BC | 2 | N/A | | |
| — | Deactivated | N/A N/A, 2020 | — | — | — | — | The title became deactivated sometime in 2020 when the company defunct. | |

== Combined reigns ==
As of August 30, 2025.

| † | Indicates the current champions |
| <1 | Indicates that the combined total is less than one day. |

=== By team ===
| Rank | Team | No. of reigns | Combined days |
|---|---|---|---|
| 1. | The Bollywood Lions/Bollywood Boyz (Harv Sihra and Gurv Sihra) | 5 | 659 |
| 2. | Models Inc. (Memphis and MR2) | 2 | 589 |
| 3. | Glamour Order of Discipline (Michelle Starr and Johnny Canuck) | 6 | 482 |
| 4. | Air Pirates/Riot (Alex Plexis, "Ravenous" Randy Myers, Nicole Matthews, and Andy "The Dreadful" Bird) | 3 | 315 |
| 5. | Backwoods Militia (Major Hardway and R.A.G.E.) | 2 | 275 |
| 6. | Club International (Skag Rollins and Seth Knight) | 2 | 244 |
| 7 | The Cunninghams (Karl Cunningham and Jack Cunningham) | 2 | 240 |
| 8. | Chill Town (Scotty Mac and Dropkick Murphy) | 4 | 232 |
| 9 | Scotty Mac and Jamie Diaz | 2 | 217 |
| 10. | Egos and Icons (Nick Price, Jamie Diaz and Tony Baroni) | 1 | 201 |
| 11. | The Amerikan Guns (Mike Santiago and Ethan H. D.) | 2 | 190 |
| 12. | The West Coast Express (Nelson Creed and Alex Plexis) | 1 | 189 |
| 13. | Jungle Fever (Abbadon and Gorilla) | 2 | 183 |
| 14. | Army of Darkness (Dr. Luther and Incubus) | 1 | 179 |
| 15. | SuperFunk (Fast Freddy Funk and VK) | 1 | 174 |
| 16. | Kenny Lush and "Bomber" Nelson Creed | 1 | 174 |
| 17. | Hot and Bothered (Cole Bishop and Kurt Sterling) | 2 | 169 |
| 18. | Ladies Choice and Layne Fontaine | 1 | 161 |
| 18. | The Vörös Twins (Chris and Patrick Vörös) | 1 | 161 |
| 20. | The Wisemen ("Beautiful" Billy Suede and Tony Baroni) | 1 | 154 |
| 21. | SCUM (Wrathchild and Killswitch) | 1 | 147 |
| 22. | Scotty Mac and Havoc | 1 | 140 |
| 23. | Team Italia (Mike Roselli and Fabulous Fabio) | 1 | 139 |
| 24. | Greatness on Demand (Michelle Starr and Disco Fury) | 1 | 119 |
| 25. | Pop Culture (Ice and Cole Bishop) | 1 | 119 |
| 26. | Repaired (Dr. Luther and Randy Myers) | 1 | 105 |
| 27. | DTA (Jordie Taylor and Daniel Adonis) | 1 | 103 |
| 28. | The Good Brothers (Nick Pesky and Mike Everett) | 2 | 98 |
| 29. | The Demon's Rejects (Cremator and Abbadon) | 1 | 91 |
| 30. | Masked Dudes of Doom (El Phantasmo and Halo) | 1 | 83 |
| 31. | Memphis and Pete Powers | 1 | 78 |
| 32. | Beauty and The Builds (Scotty Mac and Christina Von Eerie) | 1 | 77 |
| 33. | Bishy Wishy (Bishop and Fergie) | 1 | 84 |
| 34. | The Divine Prophet and Artemis Spencer | 1 | 72 |
| 35. | Sid Sylum and Dropkick Murphy | 1 | 71 |
| 36. | The Cremator and Danni Deeds | 1 | 69 |
| 37. | Dog Pound Order (Moondog Manson and Moondog Chopps) | 2 | 62 |
| 38. | Kenny Lush and Billy Suede | 1 | 28 |
| 39. | Player's Club (Chance Beckett and Steve Rizzono) | 1 | 14 |
| 40. | Sid Sylum and Azeem the Dream | 1 | 8 |
| 41. | Larry Blackwell and James Watkins | 1 | 1 |
| 42. | Dr. Luther and Juggernaut | 1 | <1 |
| 42. | High 5in' White Boys (Chance Beckett and Havoc) | 1 | <1 |
| 42. | The Administration (Scotty Mac and Michael Sweetser) | 1 | <1 |

=== By wrestler ===
| Rank | Wrestler | No. of reigns | Combined days |
|---|---|---|---|
| 1 | Chris Vörös | 2 | N/A |
| 1 | Patrick Vörös | 2 | N/A |
| 3 | Memphis Raines/Memphis | 3 | 667 |
| 4 | Gurv Sihra | 5 | 651 |
| 4 | Harv Sihra | 5 | 651 |
| 6 | Michelle Starr | 8 | 640 - |
| 7 | Scotty Mac | 8 | 602 - |
| 8 | MR2 | 2 | 589 |
| 9 | Johnny Canuck | 7 | 521 - |
| 10 | Alex Plexis | 3 | 504 |
| 11 | Bishop/Cole Bishop | 5 | 455 |
| 12 | Ravenous Randy/Randy Myers | 3 | 420 |
| 13 | Jamie Diaz | 3 | 419 |
| 14 | Nelson Creed | 2 | 363 |
| 15 | Tony Baroni | 2 | 356 |
| 16 | Ashley Sixx | 1 | 287 |
| 16 | Cat Power | 1 | 287 |
| 18 | Major Hardway | 2 | 275 |
| 18 | RAGE | 2 | 275 |
| 20 | Abbadon | 3 | 274 |
| 21 | Wisemen | 1 | 273 |
| 22 | Dr. Luther | 4 | 253 - |
| 23 | Seth Knight | 2 | 244 |
| 23 | Skag Rollins | 2 | 244 |
| 25 | DK Roc/Dropkick Murphy | 5 | 239 - |
| 26 | Jack Cunningham | 2 | 236 |
| 26 | Karl Cunningham | 2 | 236 |
| 28 | Kenny Lush | 2 | 202 |
| 28 | Nick Price | 1 | 202 |
| 30 | Ethan H. D. | 2 | 190 |
| 30 | Mike Santiago | 2 | 190 |
| 32 | Gorilla Marilla | 2 | 183 |
| 33 | Billy Suede | 2 | 182 |
| 33 | Fergie/Mike Everest | 3 | 182 |
| 35 | Fast Freddy Funk | 1 | 174 |
| 36 | Volcano | 1 | 174 |
| 37 | Kurt Sterling | 2 | 169 |
| 38 | Sid Sylum | 3 | 162 |
| 39 | Ladies Choice | 1 | 161 |
| 39 | Layne Fontaine | 1 | 161 |
| 41 | Cremator | 2 | 160 |
| 42 | Artemis Spencer/Amazing Halo | 2 | 154 |
| 43 | Killswitch | 1 | 147 |
| 43 | Wrathchild | 1 | 147 |
| 45 | Havoc | 2 | 140 |
| 46 | Fabulous Fabio | 1 | 139 |
| 46 | Mike Roselli | 2 | 139 - |
| 48 | Andy The Dreadful Bird | 1 | 133 |
| 49 | Nicole Matthews | 1 | 133 |
| 50 | Disco Fury | 1 | 119 |
| 50 | Ice | 1 | 119 |
| 52 | Daniel Adonis | 1 | 107 |
| 52 | Jordie Taylor | 1 | 107 |
| 54 | Nick Pesky | 2 | 98 |
| 55 | El Phantasmo | 1 | 83 |
| 56 | Pete Powers | 1 | 78 |
| 57 | Christina Von Eerie | 1 | 77 |
| 58 | Divine Prophet | 1 | 71 |
| 59 | Danni Deeds | 1 | 69 |
| 60 | Moondog Chopps | 2 | 63 |
| 60 | Moondog Manson | 2 | 63 |
| 62 | Chance Beckett | 2 | 14 |
| 62 | Steve Rizzono | 1 | 14 |
| 64 | Azeem The Dream | 1 | 8 |
| 65 | James Watkins | 1 | 1 |
| 65 | Larry Blackwell | 1 | 1 |
| 67 | BioHazard | 1 | <1 - |
| 67 | Randy Tyler | 1 | <1 - |
| 67 | Juggernaut | 1 | <1 - |

== See also ==
- Elite Canadian Championship Wrestling
- National Wrestling Alliance
- NWA Canadian Tag Team Championship
- NWA Canadian Open Tag Team Championship
- NWA Canadian Tag Team Championship (Calgary version)
- NWA Canadian Tag Team Championship (Vancouver version)
