= Dunn triplets =

World's only known deafblind triplets

- Born: Zoe Dunn; Sophie Dunn; Emma Dunn; April 30, 2000 (age 26); Texas, USA
- Known for: World's only deafblind triplets

The Dunn triplets, Zoe, Sophie and Emma (born April 30, 2000), are the world's only known deafblind triplets. They are all deaf and blind because of their extremely premature birth and first few months of life.

== Birth and infancy ==
The identical triplets are the world's only known deafblind triplets. They were born on April 30, 2000, at 24 weeks. Their mother had gone into labor at 23 weeks, and had managed to hold off delivery until signs of distress in the triplets led to an emergency Caesarean. The law in the state of Texas at the time of their birth stated that heroic efforts must be given to any child born 24 weeks or later. The three sisters spent months in hospitals, but all three survived to go home. As a result of their premature birth, all three developed advanced-stage retinopathy of prematurity. They began to lose their hearing after their first birthday and by their second birthday were completely deaf. They had developed ototoxicity from the antibiotics they were given in hospital to prevent infection.

== Treatment and education ==
The triplets live in the Austin area with their mother, Liz, stepfather, Phillip Norris, and three sisters. All three are completely deaf, but received cochlear implants shortly before their third birthday and have subsequently all been given a second cochlear implant. Sophie is legally blind, but she can still see shapes and read very large print at close range. She also has tunnel vision and wears thick glasses. Zoe and Emma see only darkness. All three have average intelligence, yet their extreme impairments cause them to perform below average Sophie can speak; the others communicate mainly through tactile signing. With the aid of a grant from the Dr. Phil Foundation, the girls have been able to curb some expenses for cochlear implant parts and low vision aids.

== Films and TV ==
The triplets have been featured on Dr. Phil twice and have been the focus of two documentaries: Through Your Eyes (2006) and Deaf and Blind Triplets (2008).
