= Lane twins =

American actors and models (born 1975)

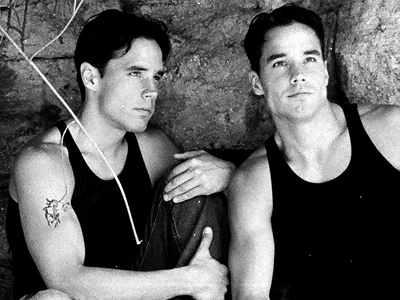
- Born: February 24, 1975 (age 51); Goldsboro, North Carolina, United States
- Modeling information
- Height: 5 ft 11 in (180 cm)
- Hair color: Brown
- Eye color: Hazel
- Website: www.lanetwins.net

Gary Lane and Larry Lane (born February 24, 1975, in Goldsboro, N.C.) are identical twin actors, models, film producers and screenwriters. The twins have appeared in feature films and national TV ads and are three-time grand prize champions of reality TV competitions. They are best known for a film they co-produced and appeared in, Hollywood to Dollywood, a feature-length documentary released theatrically in 2012. The film, about their quest to personally deliver a screenplay they've written to singer-actress Dolly Parton, played at 60 film festivals and won 24 festival awards.

== Career ==
Since the early 2000s, the Lane twins have appeared in feature films, TV programs, reality TV shows and TV commercials. As teenagers, they appeared on several episodes of Dawson's Creek and played twin colonial flag bearers in the Mel Gibson film The Patriot (2000). Other film appearances include Zoolander (2001), New Best Friend (2002), Spider-Man (2002), The Girl Next Door (2004), Eating Out 3: All You Can Eat (2009), and Jack and Jill (2011), starring Adam Sandler as twins. Gary and Larry Lane weren't both available initially for the Jack and Jill shoot and had to decline, but Sandler urged his producers to find a way to work with them. "We got the part because Adam wanted us," Gary Lane said.

Commercial appearances have included a national ad campaign for Pepsi's 100th anniversary, Dr. Scholl's Gellin Gellin, Snickers Cruncher, and a Commerce Bank ad. The Lane brothers were the "Vox Twins" for five years for Vox Vodka and were featured in a three-minute 'Twin Tested' promotional video for Virgin America airlines.

The twins have competed on and won $50,000 on NBC's Fear Factor; beating out 24 other contestants for the grand prize of $50,000 on ABC's Winter Wipeout; and won $125,000 on the reality TV competition Set For Life. Gary Lane said their goal for appearing on these shows was to win money to pay for music rights and production costs associated with their documentary Hollywood to Dollywood. "For every wipeout, I would say, 'that was for Jolene, and for every ouch, 'that was for Coat of Many Colors!,'" Gary Lane said, referring to the need to raise money for licensing rights to hit Parton songs.

In late 2013, the Lanes co-wrote and produced a comic Doritos commercial featuring actor Leslie Jordan. The commercial was a competitive entry in the Doritos 2014 'Crash the Super Bowl' video contest, but was not among the finalists.

The Lanes also collaborated on the 2022 film Still Working 9 to 5, with Gary directing and producing and Larry working as an executive producer. It's a documentary about the 1980 film 9 to 5.

== Hollywood to Dollywood ==
The Lane twins wrote a screenplay, Full Circle, which includes a role tailored for Dolly Parton. They submitted the script to Parton's management, but Parton's managers returned it as "unsolicited material." The twins decided to drive from Los Angeles, where they live, to Parton's theme park in Tennessee, Dollywood. The goal was to try and hand their script to Parton during one of her appearances at Dollywood's 25th anniversary celebration. In addition, the documentary explores the Lane twins' concerns about their Southern hometown's potential reaction to the film (and to the brothers' homosexuality) and their desire for acceptance from their Southern Baptist mother. Also on the journey is Gary's partner, Michael Bowen, who has crafted a birdhouse for Parton. The journey to deliver their screenplay is the focus of their documentary feature, Hollywood to Dollywood, which played at 60 film festivals throughout 2011 and 2012, winning 24 awards.

Parton makes an appearance in the film. After viewing the documentary, she gave the twins rights to use her music and likeness in its promotions. In a press conference, Parton said she appreciated that she was "an inspiration (to the Lanes) and someone they kind of leaned on" and that she was "proud" to be a part of their documentary. The Lane twins donate 10 percent of each Hollywood to Dollywood DVD sold to Parton's Imagination Library, an organization that provides free books to young children and is part of the Dollywood Foundation.

== See also ==
- List of twins
