= Hollywood to Dollywood =

2011 documentary film by Johnny Lavin

- Directed by: John Lavin
- Produced by: Gary Lane; Larry Lane; Michael Bowen
- Cinematography: Jennifer D'Urso
- Edited by: John Lavin
- Music by: Greg Delson
- Release dates: July 9, 2011 (Philadelphia Q Fest); August 31, 2012 (United States)
- Running time: 81 minutes
- Country: United States
- Language: English

Hollywood to Dollywood is an American documentary film that played at 60 film festivals in the U.S., Canada, Scotland, and Australia in 2011 and 2012. Directed by John Lavin, the film follows the cross-country journey of identical twins Gary and Larry Lane to deliver to Dolly Parton a screenplay they wrote, which includes a role for her. Hollywood to Dollywood has won 24 film festival awards and includes 17 Parton songs, two of which were previously unreleased. The film had a one-week theatrical release in New York beginning August 31, 2012, followed a week later in Los Angeles.

== Plot ==
Twin brothers Gary and Larry Lane, originally from Goldsboro, N.C., have written a screenplay entitled Full Circle with a role specifically for their idol, Dolly Parton. Unsuccessful in their efforts to bring the screenplay to the singer-actress's attention, the brothers travel in an RV from Los Angeles, where they reside, to Dollywood, Parton's theme park in Pigeon Forge, Tennessee. Their plan is to hand the screenplay to Parton, whom they had met a few times briefly, at one of her scheduled appearances during Dollywood's 25th anniversary celebration.

Hollywood to Dollywood follows the brothers' travels in the RV they nicknamed Jolene, after one of Parton's hit songs. Also on board Jolene as the main driver is Michael Bowen, Gary Lane's partner. Bowen hopes to present Parton with a birdhouse he handcrafted, a replica of her Tennessee home. During the five-day journey of 2,200 miles along Interstate 40, the Lanes revise their screenplay, endure a tornado, meet everyday Americans, and talk about their experiences growing up gay in North Carolina. The 2010 Nashville flood nearly derails their plans to get to Dollywood in time to meet Parton. The documentary also explores the Lane twins' concerns about their Southern hometown's potential reaction to the film (and to the brothers' homosexuality) and their desire for acceptance from their Southern Baptist mother.

Hollywood to Dollywood includes appearances from several of the Lane twins' friends, including actors Leslie Jordan, Chad Allen, Beth Grant and Ann Walker and Oscar-winning screenwriter Dustin Lance Black.

== Cast ==
- Gary Lane as himself
- Larry Lane as himself
- Michael Bowen as himself
- Dolly Parton as herself
- Leslie Jordan as himself
- Chad Allen as himself
- Dustin Lance Black as himself
- Beth Grant as herself
- Ann Walker as herself
- Manouschka Guerrier as herself

== Parton's involvement ==
After viewing the film, Parton granted the Lane twins the use of some of her songs for the film as well as the DVD and Blu-ray versions. Parton's music, including hits such as I Will Always Love You, Coat of Many Colors, and Jolene and two previously unreleased songs Celebrate the Dreamer in You and The Sky is Not the Limit, serve as a backdrop throughout the film. The brothers helped pay for the rights to Parton's music with prize money earned on the reality TV program Wipeout.

Parton also gave permission to use her likeness in the film's poster and in the film's promotion. She gave the filmmakers footage shot at Dollywood and during the opening of her Trinkets and Treasures store in Nashville. Parton appears in the film as well, in news clips and in footage shot for the documentary.

During a press conference Parton said she appreciated that she was "an inspiration (to the Lanes) and someone they kind of leaned on." She said she was "proud" to be a part of their documentary.

The Lane twins donate 10 percent of each DVD and Blu-ray sale to the Imagination Library, an organization administered by Parton's Dollywood Foundation. The Imagination Library provides free books each month to young children enrolled in the program.

== Accolades ==
The Lanes submitted their film to festivals whose timing would coincide with Parton's tour dates. During 2011 and 2012, Hollywood to Dollywood played at 60 film festivals in the U.S., Canada, Scotland, and Australia.

The New York Times review of the film said, "The optimism and good humor of John Lavin's crude, endearing documentary...are so unquenchable that its disturbing underlying theme — growing up gay in the South is no picnic — is partly obscured by its openheartedness." The Hollywood Reporter wrote: "Hollywood to Dollywood overcomes its thematic limitations with an endearing, casual charm that only the most curmudgeonly could fully resist." The Village Voice said the film is "as much a road movie as it is a subtle screed on civil rights." On her TV program, Rosie O'Donnell called Hollywood to Dollywood "a beautiful movie." In a review on the website AfterElton.com, Brent Hartinger wrote that "the movie's terrific — a true crowd-pleaser all the way." Hartinger added that "easily the most interesting thing about the movie is its look at American Southern culture, particularly as it applies to gays." The blog DVDTalk said the film is "thoroughly enjoyable," "a hybrid of carefree road trip and probing examination of the Southern American LGBT community."

Hollywood to Dollywood has won 24 film festivals awards including Best Documentary, Audience Favorite at the Sydney Mardi Gras Film Festival (2012); Best Documentary, NYC Downtown Feature Film Festival (2012); Audience Choice Award, Best Documentary, Out on Film Festival, Atlanta (2012); and two awards at the 8th Annual ReelHeART International Film Festival in Toronto (2011), including the prestigious 'Founder's Award (Best of the Fest) and First Place, Feature Documentary Award.
