= Brother & Co. =

American rock band

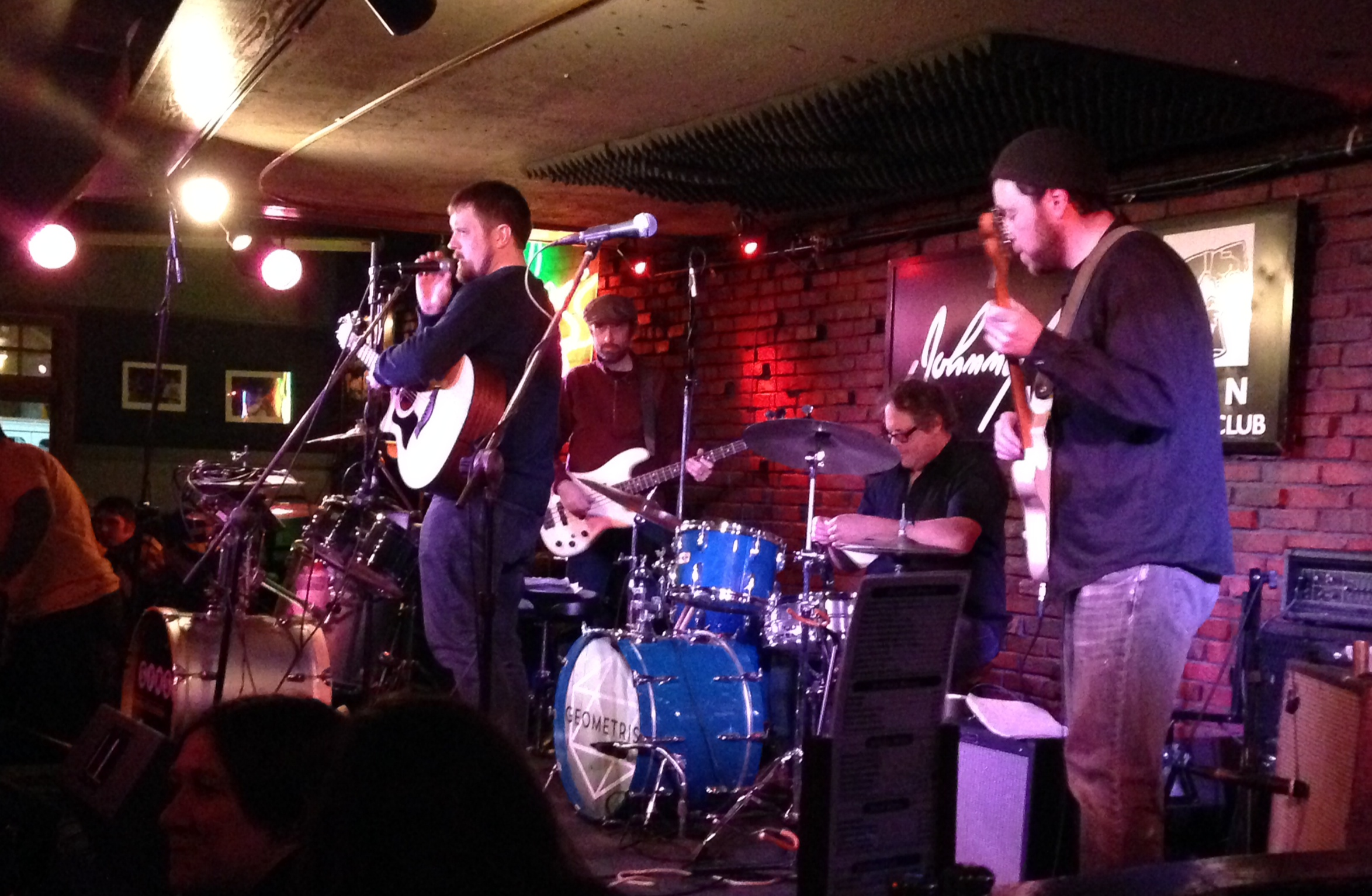
- Brother & Co. performing at Johnny D's in Somerville, Massachusetts

Background information
- Origin: Somerville, Massachusetts
- Years active: 2012–2015
- Members: Joshua Pritchard; John Pritchard; Andy Plaisted; Dave Westner; Andy Santospago; John Ryan Gallagher
- Website: www.brotherandcompany.bandcamp.com

Brother & Co. was an American rock band from Somerville, Massachusetts. The band was formed in 2012 by singer-songwriter Joshua Pritchard and his identical twin brother John. The Pritchard brother's previous musical group, Ruin/Renewal, released two EP's on the independent Portsmouth, New Hampshire based music label Burst and Bloom.

Production for Brother & Co.'s debut album Unknow You was partially funded by a successful Kickstarter campaign in May 2013, which was lauded by the alternative music criticism website Powder My Noise.

Unknow You was recorded over four days in January 2013 at Q Division Studios. The album received advance praise from the music criticism website Jamsphere.com, which hailed the release as "utterly unique," and "one of the best indie albums [of 2013]." Unknow You was first released in June 2013, but received a secondary release in December 2013. Following the album's second release, The Noise Music New England praised it as "unique and moving."

The band released the two-song EP SACRED OBJECT in April 2014. Joshua Pritchard released an album of new material under the name Bad Person on September 14, 2018. Three Bad Person singles followed in 2019; "Do That On Your Own Time," "Re-Namer," and "Heat Lightning." In 2020, Pritchard released his fourth and final single as Bad Person, "Safe Habitat," which was premiered by Plastic Mag UK. Since 2021, he has released music as J. L. Pritchard.

== Discography ==
- Unknow You (LP) CD, digital (Seaewe Records, 2013)
- SACRED OBJECT (EP) CD, digital (Seaewe Records, 2014)
