= Oliver Riot =

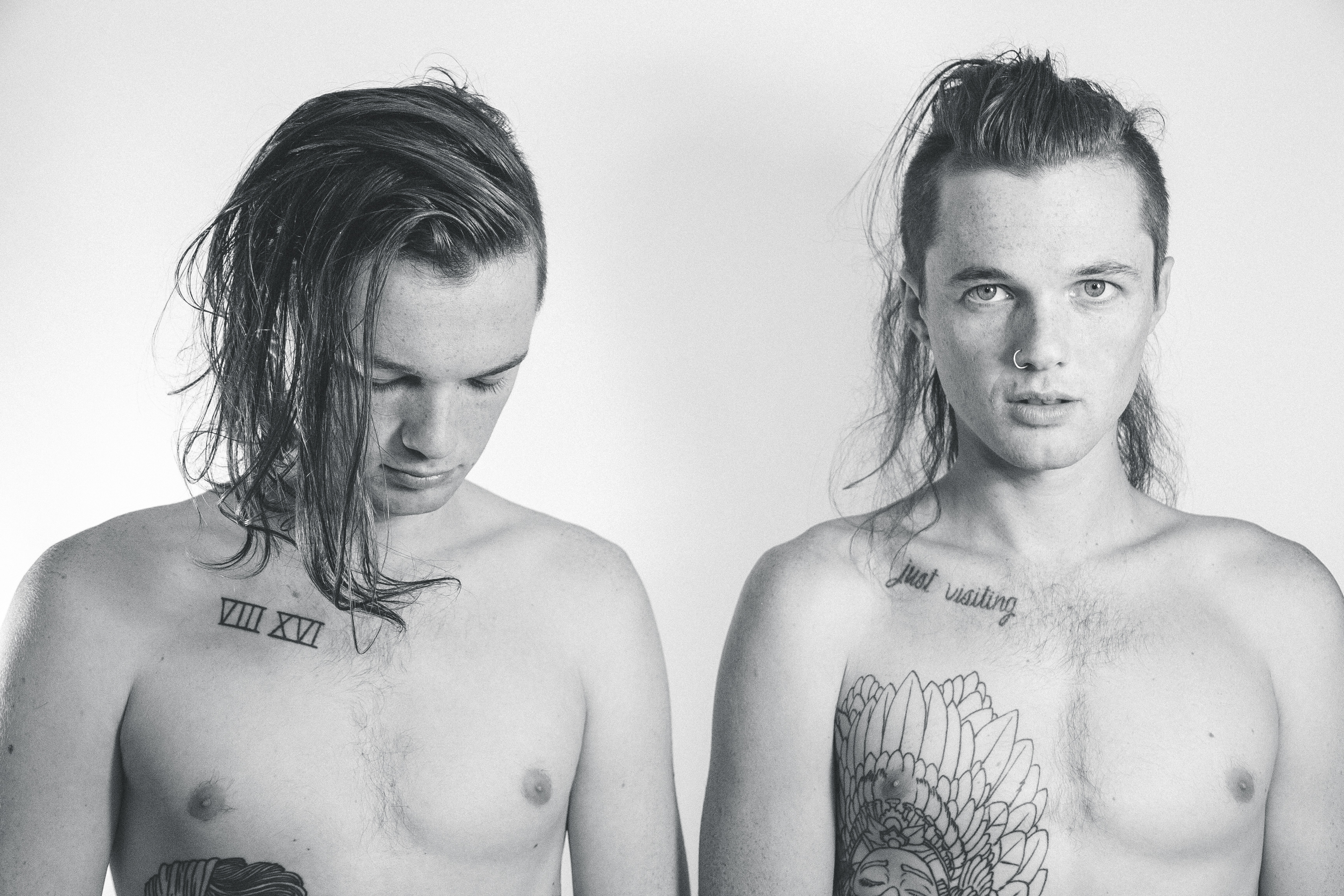
Oliver Riot (Benjamin on left and Alexander on right) photographed by Jason Kramer

Oliver Riot is a Folk/R&B/Soul duo composed of Benjamin and Alexander Moore, identical twins from Albuquerque, New Mexico, USA.

== Early life ==
Benjamin and Alexander Moore lived in Peru until the age of 5, when their family moved to New Mexico. When they were 14, they started playing Gypsy Jazz together in the style of Django Reinhardt at restaurants, coffee shops, bars, breweries, and street corners in Albuquerque. They purchased their first car, a green Ford Explorer, with the money they received from gigs and began writing their own music at the age of 16. Two years later, the brothers drove to Los Angeles in that Ford Explorer to play music.

== Career ==
Shortly following their move to LA, Oliver Riot took home first place in the Grammy's annual "Rock The Mic Competition", showcasing emerging California artists, and were awarded studio time with legendary producer, Mike Clink (Guns N' Roses, Metallica, Eddie Money, etc.).

Oliver Riot released their debut EP, Hallucinate, within unique circumstances. The album was produced in its entirety by Real Miilk in the back room of a Korean Church. Alexander lived in his van parked outside of the church while creating the record, until being hassled by police, which ultimately led him to begin squatting in the back of the church full time. Benjamin then joined in, squatting with his brother inside the church. The twins took shelter there for over one year, continuing to do so while recording the duo's next album, Neurosis.

Based in Los Angeles, the twins currently write, record, and produce Oliver Riot’s albums from their bedrooms. Oliver Riot is managed by Danny Rukasin who also manages Billie Eilish and Finneas.

Often compared to James Vincent McMorrow, James Blake, and Passenger, Indie TrendSetters says, "Oliver Riot is a dazzling point of unnoticed incandescence, an ineffable aurora devoid of deserving admirers, a true work of underground art that makes mainstream music look like superficial sham."

== Discography ==
EPs

- Hallucinate (November 4, 2015, Independent)
- Neurosis (January 20, 2017, Independent)
- Nervous (October 16, 2019, Independent)
- Faint (July 23, 2021, Independent)
- Cold (September 17, 2021, Independent)
- Tingle (March 5, 2022, Independent)
- Inhale (June 17, 2022, Independent)
- Holy Fuck (July 15, 2022, Independent)
