= Chris and Patrick Vörös =

Canadian professional wrestlers and social media personalities

- Born: August 20, 1993 (age 33); Vancouver, British Columbia, Canada
- Other names: Voros Twins; Da Vinki Twins
- Occupations: Professional wrestlers Social media personalities

Chris and Patrick Vörös (born August 20, 1993), known online as the Voros Twins or the Da Vinki Twins, are Hungarian Canadian identical twins known for being a professional wrestling tag team and social media personalities. They are best known for going viral on TikTok after mispronouncing Leonardo da Vinci's last name as "Da Vinki" along with their comedy videos. In 2020, they won the ECCW Tag Team Championship.

== Career ==
Chris and Patrick Vörös began professional wrestling in 2013 after meeting Elite Canadian Championship Wrestling (ECCW) Champion Theo Francon and enrolling into ECCW wrestling school. In 2016, the pair posted their audition for the WWE professional wrestling reality television series Tough Enough on YouTube. In 2020, the pair ended their relationship with ECCW.

In 2022, the twins made their All Elite Wrestling debut on AEW Dark: Elevation in Toronto, Canada with support from fans.

== Personal lives ==
In 2023, the twins made a special appearance at a Yung Gravy concert, and were referenced in John Oliver's Last Week Tonight show in the fall of the same year.

The twins have made jokes about other creators such as the Island Boys.

== Championships and accomplishments ==
- 365 Pro Wrestling
  - 365 Tag Team Championship (1 time)
- Don't Own Anyone Pro Wrestling
  - DOA Tag Team Championship (1 times)
- Dungeon Wrestling
  - Dungeon Wrestling Tag Team Championship (1 time, current)
- Elite Canadian Championship Wrestling
  - ECCW Tag Team Championship (2 times, final)
  - ECCW TriCity Trios Championship (1 time, final) - with Ravenous Randy Myers
- Real Canadian Wrestling
  - RCW Canadian Tag Team Championship (1 time)
