= Kinsan Ginsan =

Twin sisters from Japan widely known for their longevity

Kinsan Ginsan きんさんぎんさん
- Born: Kin Yano (矢野 きん); Gin Yano (矢野 ぎん); 1 August 1892; Nagoya, Empire of Japan
- Died: Kin Narita: 23 January 2000 (aged 107); Gin Kanie: 28 February 2001 (aged 108); Nagoya, Japan
- Other names: Gold and Silver
- Known for: Oldest ever twin centenarians
- Children: 6 (combined)

Kin Narita (成田 きん, Narita Kin; née Yano (矢野);1 August 1892 – 23 January 2000) and Gin Kanie (蟹江 ぎん, Kanie Gin; née Yano (矢野); 1 August 1892 – 28 February 2001), known together as Kinsan Ginsan (きんさんぎんさん), were Japanese identical twin sisters known for their longevity and for being the oldest living twins, living to ages 107 and 108, respectively. Their names literally translated to English mean "Gold" and "Silver". Their health and vitality, despite being over 100 years old, was said to be "an ideal form of living in your sunset years", and they became national celebrities in Japan.

== History ==
The twins were born on 1 August 1892, in Narumi Village (currently in Midori Ward, Nagoya), Aichi Prefecture. Kin was the elder daughter and Gin was the younger daughter. Tests later proved that they were identical twins, though their blood types differed. Their favourite food was fish with red flesh.

In 1991, when about to reach 100 years of age, the twins were featured in a newspaper article and received congratulations from both the mayor of Nagoya and the Aichi Prefecture governor. In 2000, Kin Narita, the elder twin died, aged 107 years and 175 days. The cause of death was heart failure, as confirmed by an autopsy. 13 months later, in February 2001, her younger sister Gin died at 108 years of age. The cause of death could not be attributed to any specific diagnosis and therefore was given as "old age".

One of the sisters had four daughters who also showed signs of longevity. The four sisters have taken part in a documentary by NHK, Today's Close-Up. The sisters also featured in a study about longevity. At the time of Kin's death in 2000 the twins had six children, 11 grandchildren, seven great-grandchildren and one great-great-grandchild combined.
