= Island Boys =

American rap duo and TikTokers

- Kodiyakredd in 2025
- Born: Alex Venegas; Franky Venegas; July 16, 2001 (age 25)
- Occupation: Social media personalities
- Children: Alex: 1

TikTok information
- Page: Flyysoulja
- Followers: 7.5 million
- Last updated: August 6, 2023

Alex and Franky Venegas (born July 16, 2001), known as Flyysoulja and Kodiyakredd respectively, and collectively as the Island Boys, are two American twin brothers who became popular on the video sharing platform TikTok in 2021. The brothers are based in Coral Springs, Florida. They went viral with their song "I'm an Island Boy".

== Early lives ==
The Island Boys are twin brothers. Their given names are Alex and Franky Venegas. They were born on July 16, 2001, and are of Cuban ancestry. In a podcast interview, the twins explained that their father died when they were young and they were raised by their single mother. Growing up, the twins were often in trouble with the law and committed crimes including robbery and burglary, automobile theft, and possessing narcotics. Their mother kicked them out at the age of 18 due to poor behavior. Alex has a daughter.

== Career ==
While in jail as teenagers, the brothers decided to pursue a rap career. In October 2021, a video of the duo performing a song went viral on Twitter. The pair's distinctive appearance, including tattoos, diamond teeth, and vertical dreadlocks helped turn their video into a meme that gained traction on TikTok. They subsequently turned down a record deal with Kodak Black. The original video garnered 9 million views before it was deleted.

That November, the duo released a fully produced version of their viral song, "I'm an Island Boy", backed by a music video. The twins promoted the release with a poorly received performance at Club LIV in Miami. In May 2022, the Island Boys were invited to participate in the reality show Ultimate Social Boxing. That December, the documentary Trolled: The Untold Island Boys Story, detailing the professional and personal lives of the twins, was released.

In July 2023, videos of the twins kissing were used to promote their OnlyFans account and went viral and questions arose about the sexuality of the brothers. It was reported by some outlets that Alex was gay, but, his response to the video, saying he was a 'top' was ultimately ambiguous and he said that his actions with his brother were simply for attention.

== Legal issues ==
In January 2022, Franky Venegas was accused of domestic abuse by Montaisha Shanell on Instagram Live. The two had been romantically involved. Shanell stated that Venegas regularly beat her, with the abuse dating back to at least April 2021.

In March 2022, Franky Venegas was accused of battery after allegedly hitting his brother's girlfriend when she refused to leave their house. No charges were filed.

In May 2023, Franky Venegas was arrested for domestic battery in a Pompano Beach AirBNB. He was accused of slapping his girlfriend before pushing her into a shallow pool, injuring her chin. The altercation started after an argument regarding Venegas' past abusive behavior. Venegas was released from Broward County Main Jail later that month.

In February 2025, Franky Venegas was arrested in Naples, Florida, following a traffic stop and charged with possession of a controlled substance without a prescription and delivering/possessing/selling a firearm with an altered serial number.

On December 31, 2025, while still on bond for the February arrest, Franky Venegas was arrested again, by Collier County deputies, for possession of controlled substances without a prescription, fentanyl-laced paraphernalia and zolpidem. He was sent to Collier County Jail to await his arraignment, scheduled for January 21, 2026.

On November 5, 2026, Alex Venegas was arrested after shoplifting from a Hallandale Beach Walgreens. Venegas stuffed items into his pants to conceal them, including Aquaphor ointment, therapy cream, a disposable razor, Vaseline and lotion, with a combined value of $75.45. Venegas was released from hospital earlier that same day, following a drug related health incident.

=== Association with Andrew James Thomas ===
On February 7, 2022, the Venegas brothers' home in Florida was raided by police. A man named Andrew James Thomas, a childhood friend of the Venegas brothers, was arrested on the property in connection to a drive-by shooting that killed an 8-year-old girl just three days before. Alex Venegas claimed that Thomas ran towards him with a gun, asking to hide the weapon in their house. After Venegas refused, Thomas placed the gun in a closet. It was found by pursuing SWAT personnel.

The Venegas brothers were not implicated in the case, and their manager Dovi Bezner told press that the twins' childhood friend had been staying in their home and said, "We had no clue about any of these allegations towards him. We just knew him as a good person, someone that grew up with the Island Boys. If we knew something like this was going on, we never would have allowed him on the property." Thomas faced charges of first-degree murder with a firearm, being a felon in possession of a firearm, and attempted first-degree murder with a firearm. He was sentenced to 45 years in prison for one count of second-degree murder and eight counts of attempted second-degree murder. Following the arrest, Alex Venegas denounced gun violence.

== Controversies ==
=== Celebrity feuds ===
The Island Boys have been involved in multiple online feuds involving other social media personalities such as podcaster Adam22, rapper Blueface, YouTuber Fousey, brothers Logan Paul and Jake Paul, TikTok personality Bryce Hall, and mainstream celebrities such as comedian Kevin Hart and rapper Snoop Dogg. Hart and Snoop Dogg notably mocked the twins on their comedy special "2021 and Done". While watching the Island Boys' TikTok debut among other viral videos of the past year, Snoop Dogg held his head in his hands, saying, "I'm speechless. Two goofballs in a pool." Hart then responded, "I'm not speechless. You know why?" and then began to mockingly sing the Island Boys' song from the video clip.

In December 2021, the pair first clashed with Logan Paul after being invited onto his podcast "Impaulsive" and disagreeing with Paul's co-host George Janko regarding financial advice. Janko suggested that the brothers invest money from their initial success in case their career as rappers did not prove lucrative in the future. The brothers responded by saying that they did not need financial advice, and Alex addressed Janko by saying "I probably make more money than you."

The pair later attended a boxing match in support of Paul, but were allegedly "kicked out for throwing shoes" according to online commentator Keemstar. When the twins entered the boxing arena, they were booed by Paul's fans for walking off of "Impaulsive". Paul's brother, Jake Paul, discussed the controversy on the next episode of "Impaulsive", saying, "For you to have the audacity to stand up to George Janko, the nicest guy in the world, ... you're a fucking punk."

=== US Army marketing ===
In January 2022, the twins made a commissioned video through Cameo, a platform that allows celebrities to be paid to make custom videos for fans. The video was reposted on TikTok by a Texas-based army recruiter named Orlando Tamez, and shows the brothers saying, "Big shoutout to Staff Sergeant Tamez, you're changing lives, giving you $50K...Giving out bonuses? Paid vacation? And free college, no money." The video was reposted again onto the website Reddit in a subreddit called r/Army.

The video sparked controversy and resulted in a representative for the US Army Recruiting Command making the following statement to NBC: "The Island Boys Cameo was not reviewed, authorized, nor paid for by US Army Recruiting Command as an official marketing tool. We are investigating the situation and requiring the individual recruiter to remove the TikTok account, as it is not authorized for official use at this time."

== Personal life ==
In November 2025, Alex Venegas was treated under the Baker Act after having a drug-induced psychotic episode at his Miami area home.

On October 29 2026, Alex Venegas was taken to a Miami hospital after using a combination of cocaine, benzodiazepines, and Percocet. He initially told TMZ he suffered an overdose, but then said it was a psychotic episode brought on by drug use and sleep deprivation.

== Discography ==
=== Studio albums ===
List of studio albums, with selected details
Title	Studio album details
Type of Wave (credited to Kodiyakredd)	Released: October 13, 2020; Label: Island Boyz Ent.; Format: Digital download, streaming
17 (credited to Flyysoulja)	Released: May 16, 2022; Label: Island Boyz Ent.; Format: Digital download, streaming
Trendsetters (credited to Kodiyakredd)	Released: May 31, 2022; Label: Island Boyz Ent.; Format: Digital download, streaming

=== Extended plays ===
List of EPs, with selected details
Title	EP details
Stardom (credited to Flyysoulja)	Released: March 21, 2021; Label: Big Bag Ent.; Format: Digital download, streaming
Life Been Good (credited to Flyysoulja)	Released: July 11, 2021; Label: Big Bag Ent.; Format: Digital download, streaming
