= Pakistan Broadcasters Association =

Private media association of Pakistan

- Pakistan Broadcasters Association (PBA)
- پاکستان براڈ کاسٹرز ایسوسی ایشن
- Abbreviation: PBA
- Established: September 23, 2005; 21 years ago
- Founder: Mir Shakil ur Rehman (Jang)
- Founded at: Karachi
- Headquarters: 177/ 2, 1st Floor, I.E.P Building, Liaquat Barracks, Shahrah-e-Faisal, Karachi, Pakistan - 75530.
- Location: Karachi, Pakistan
- Region served: Pakistan
- Members: 110 (2021)
- Official languages: English, Urdu
- Secretary General: Shakeel Masud Hussain (DAWN NEWS)
- Chairman: Mian Amer Mahmood
- Senior Vice Chairman: Salman Iqbal (ARY)
- Vice Chairman: Mir Ibrahim Rahman (GEO)
- Website: pba.org.pk

Pakistan Broadcasters Association (PBA) (Urdu: پاکستان براڈ کاسٹرز ایسوسی ایشن); is a private association of television and radio broadcasters in Pakistan. It was established on September 23, 2005 at a meeting in Karachi. Mir Shakil ur Rehman, founder of the association, was elected as the first chairman of association. Mian Amer Mahmood (Dunya TV) is current chairman of PBA.

== History ==
Pakistan Broadcasters Association (PBA) was established on September 23, 2005 in a meeting of founding members including Mir Shakil-ur-Rahman of GEO TV, Ghazanfar Ali of Indus TV, A. Rauf of ARY, A. Jabbar of ATV, Aslam Kazi of KTN, Ahmed Zubairi and Asif Zubairi of Aaj TV, Imran Mehboob of Hum TV, Dr Karim of Sindh TV, Arshad Anis of AVT Khyber, Agha Nasir of FM101, Arshad Khan of PTV, Mohsin Naqvi of CNN, Abid Shaikh of Filmazia, Muhammad Asim of Business Plus, Zaheer Khan of FM91 and TV1, Meimoona Siddiqi, Muhammad Zaki, Shahid Javed, Mehdi Raza of FM107, Waseem Ahmed of FM99, Afaq Haider of FM105, Syed Sajjad H. Shah of APNA TV, Akbar Bhutto of FM91, FM92 and FM93 and Dr Rafat of FM96. They elected the founder of the association, Mir Shakil ur Rehman as the first chairman of PBA. Additionally Rehman headed an ad-hoc committee which selected five members to formulate rules and regulations of the Association.

== Members ==
Member channels of PBA are divided into two main types.

=== Television ===
Members of television category are further divided into subcategories of Permanent members, members, associate members, affiliate members.

=== Radio ===
Members of radio category are further categorized into members and associate members.

== Association Leadership and Governance ==
The Pakistan Broadcasters Association (PBA) is governed by its Board of Directors, a body of elected representatives responsible for providing strategic direction and making key decisions.

Pakistan Broadcasters Association Board of Directors
Name	Title	Company
Mian Aamir Mahmood	Chairman	Dunya TV
Salman Iqbal	Senior Vice Chairman	ARY Communications
Mir Ibrahim Rahman	Vice Chairman	GEO TV Network
Shakeel Masud Hussain	Secretary General	Dawn News
Ahmad A. Zuberi	Joint Secretary	Aaj News
M. Athar Kazi	Finance Secretary	KTN Network
Awad Hanif	Director	A-Plus
Syed Sarfraz Hussain Shah	Director	APNA TV Channel
Jawad Hamid Raja	Director	AVT Khyber
Nazafreen Saigol	Director	City FM 89
Ilyas Shakir	Director	Dhoom TV
Kaiser Rafiq	Director	Discover Pakistan TV
Sultan Ali Lakhani	Director	Express News
Zulfiqar Ali Shah	Director	FM 105
Shahid Jamal	Director	FM 106.2
Duraid Qureshi	Director	HUM Network Limited
Ghulam Nabi Morai	Director	Mehran TV
Ch. Abdul Rahman	Director	Neo TV
Ambreen Jan	Director	Pakistan Television Corporation (PTV)
Sara Taher Khan	Director	Radio 1 FM 91
Mirza Muhammad Naeem	Director	Radio Awaz
Nadeem Malik	Director	SAMAA TV
Dr. Abdul Karim Rajpar	Director	Sindh Television Network
Ahmad Baig	Director	TV One

=== Committees ===
To support the Board of Directors and manage specific areas of focus, the PBA has established various committees.

- Executive Committee
- Clearance Committee
- Dispute Resolution Committee
- Accreditation Committee
- Scrutiny Committee
- Distribution Committee
- Marketing & Public Relations Committee
- Advertising Agencies/ MBH Relations Committee
- PEMRA Committee
- Audit/Vigilance Committee
- Government Relations Committee
- Legal Affairs Committee
- Constitution and Rules Reform Committee
- Radio Committee
- Taxation and Finance Committee
- Code of Conduct and Implementation Committee
- Awards, Public Relations and Media Committee
- PAS Relations Committee
- Committee of Entertainment Channels
- Digital Media Committee

== See also ==
- Pakistan Federal Union of Journalists
- All Pakistan Newspapers Society
