= Irshad Ahmed Haqqani =

Pakistani newspaper editor and journalist

Irshad Ahmed Haqqani (6 September 1928 – 24 January 2010) was a senior editor, veteran journalist and reputed column writer for the Jang Group of Newspapers. He also served as federal information minister in Malik Meraj Khalid’s caretaker government in 1996–97.

His series of columns have been published in many volumes in Urdu language. His famous column "Heraf Temana" has still great influence even after his death, upon people of Pakistan especially intellectuals and politicians of Pakistan. He often used to publish in his column, a letter of an eminent Politician on a national issue, and thus a national political debate was started by the letters of others politicians and intellectuals published in his columns. He often criticized the Martial Law Government of General Muhammad Zia Ul Haq and General Pervaiz Musharraf.

== Early life ==
Haqqani was born on 6 September 1928 in Kasur. After completing his education, he worked in the publishing section of Jamaat-e-Islami Lahore for a brief period but left after developing some differences with the Jamaat. He then shifted to his hometown Kasur and started his career as a lecturer in the Islamia college at Kasur, which was later nationalised during the regime of Z.A Bhutto and retired as the principal of the same college. He also served, for several years, as professor of history at the Islamia College, Kasur. He joined Jamaat-i-Islami and served as editor of its organ Tasneem for some time. But he and a group of senior scholars and ideologues led by Maulana Amin Ahsan Islahi left the party after developing differences with the party's founder Maulana Maududi over his policy of bringing about the Islamic revolution through the ballot. The differences erupted at the 1957 Machhi Goth meeting of the Jamaat.

== Career ==
Haqqani worked with various newspapers during the course of his career and was associated with the Jang Group of Newspapers starting in 1981 until the time of his death, where he became a senior editor of the national newspaper, Daily Jang. Besides his popular daily column titled ‘Harf-e-Tamanna’, he remained well acclaimed among different schools of thoughts including scholars and politicians. As a senior editor of the Daily Jang, he gave new trends to newspaper column writing in Pakistan.

Haqqani was also a patron of the Mir Khalil ur Rehman Society. He used to include criticism in his columns with the purpose of presenting solutions. Even ex-president Pervaiz Musharraf lauded his columns despite the fact that he used to criticize the General. Haqqani was an educationist-turned-columnist who influenced almost three generations of Pakistanis. He imparted education and awareness amongst youngsters and the old throughout his career. He was a vocal supporter of the deprived and oppressed people and spoke up for the cause of Palestine, Kashmir and Vietnam. He was a well-read person on all subjects. He urged researchers and students to preserve his journalistic contributions by doing research on his work.

== Death and legacy ==
Haqqani suffered from heart disease and died on 24 January 2010 at age 81. His funeral was held at Lahore, Pakistan. He was buried at his ancestral graveyard in Daimul Hazoori, Kasur, Punjab, Pakistan. Among his survivors are two sons and two daughters.

Pakistani luminaries attending his funeral included Senator Pervaiz Rasheed, former federal ministers Khurshid Mahmud Kasuri, Sartaj Aziz and many senior journalists and newspaper editors.

== Books ==
- Gumaan Ka Mumkin (گماں کا ممکن): A collection of essays exploring political thought.
- Musalmaano Ka Nizam-e-Hukumat (مسلمانوں کا نظام حکومت): An analysis of Islamic governance systems.
- Muhabbaton Ke Mosam (محبتوں کے موسم): A compilation of writings on social themes.

== See also ==
- Jang Group of Newspapers
- Muhammad Zia Ul Haq
- Farooq Leghari
- Malik Meraj Khalid
- Mir Khalil ur Rehman
