= Ring of Pakistan =

- Abbreviation: ROP
- Formation: 2017; 9 years ago
- Type: Professional wrestling promotion
- Headquarters: Islamabad, Pakistan
- CEO: Imran Shah
- Chairman: Syed Asim Shah
- Website: rop.com.pk

Ring of Pakistan (also known as ROP) is a Pakistani professional wrestling promotion with office based in Islamabad, Pakistan. It was founded in 2017. Pakistani media outlets have described it as a company organising international wrestling competitions in Pakistan. Their stated mission is to highlight positive image of Pakistan to the world through wrestling.

Ring of Pakistan is led by CEO Imran Shah and Chairman Syed Asim Shah. The promotion has been supported by Pakistan's Inter-Services Public Relations (ISPR) to stage its events.

== History ==
=== Background and Pre-ROP Wrestling in Pakistan ===
Professional wrestling has a long history in Pakistan, rooted in traditional style of wrestling known as pehlwani. The land of Punjab has given the world some greatest wrestlers in history like The Great Gama whose real name was Ghulam Muhammad Baksh Butt who was a global icon, Imam Baksh, Bholu brothers who continued the legacy, Gunga Pehlwan and many more. The legacy continues till now.

=== Ring of Pakistan (2017) ===
Ring of Pakistan (ROP)'s mission was to promote professional wrestling in Pakistan as an international platform which can show the positive side of Pakistan, be a vehicle for peace.

=== Leadership ===
Ring of Pakistan is led by CEO Imran Shah (Syed Imran Hussain Shah) who is a British Pakistani Entrepreneur who organised the company's events. Shah was brought up in Islamabad and later moved to United Kingdom to pursue higher education before going into business. He has no background in wrestling or entertainment industry.

Pir Asim Ali Shah is identified as the company's Chairman.

==== Season 2018 : #FightForPeace (December 2018) ====
Ring of Pakistan Season 2018 was announced under the campaign slogan #FightForPeace, positioning the event as a peace initiative. A delegation of wrestlers arrived in Pakistan to promote the forthcoming season, visiting ISPR in coordination for the event.

The 2018 season featured two events:

- Karachi : 7 December 2018 at KMC Sports Complex
- Lahore : 9 December 2018 at Alhamra Art Centre (Open Air, opposite Qaddafi Stadium)

Over 20 international wrestlers from the UK, USA, Canada, France, Hong Kong, Belgium and other countries participated. The roster included:

- Chris Masters (USA, real name Chris Adonis) who is a former WWE superstar
- Tiny Iron (Andrew Harrison, UK)
- KC Spinelli (Natalie Harrison, Canada)
- Ho Ho Lun (Wong Yuk Lun, Hong Kong) who is a former WWE NXT participant
- Sylvester Lefort / Tom La Ruffa (France) who is also a former WWE NXT superstar
- Bernard Vandamme (Belgium)
- Timm Wylie (Tim Tango, UK)
- Cyanide (Heddi Karaoui)
- Badshah Pehalwan Khan (Pakistan) reigning ROP Heavyweight Champion
- Jonny Loquasto - Hollywood actor and TV host, serving as event host

Hum TV was the official broadcaster during this event, transmitting the wrestling matches in separate episodes covering matches of both Karachi and Lahore.

Results - Lahore, 9 December 2018 (Alhamra Cultural Complex):

- Bernard Vandamme defeated Tim Wylie
- Ludovic Vaillant defeated Ho Ho Lun and Red Scorpion (Triple Threat)
- KC Spinelli defeated Mila Smidt
- Tiny Iron defeated Crater
- Bjorg Haaken & Tom La Ruffa defeated Adam Benseba & Yacine Osmani (Tag Team)
- ROP World Heavyweight Championship: Badshah Pehalwan Khan (c) defeated Chris Masters
- Battle Royal: Yacine Osmani defeated Adam Benseba, Bernard Vandamme, Ho Ho Lun, Red Scorpion, Tim Wylie and Tom La Ruffa

Badshah Pehalwan Khan won the ROP World Heavyweight Championship, defeating Chris Masters in the title match. The 2018 season drew significant international media coverage, including features on BBC News Global, ITV News London and Fox Sports Asia along with many other platforms coverage.

=== ROP Fest 2019 : Dedicated to Kashmiris (August 2019) ===
Ring of Pakistan organised its third major event as ROP Fest 2019, a three-day family festival held at Pakistan Sports Complex, Islamabad between 28-30 August 2019.

The 2019 edition was dedicated to the people of Kashmir in solidarity with the Azad Kashmir as their ws heavy LOC shelling affecting civilians on both sides, 5 August is marked as Black Day due to that. ROP Fest 2019 expanded the format beyond pure wrestling to include music, a Strongman Competition, food stalls and family entertainment.

The wrestler roster included Chris Masters (USA), Tiny Iron (UK), Drake Destroyer, Badshah Pehalwan Khan, So Cal Val and Armitis, among many other international wrestlers.

=== 2020 : ROP Talent Hunting Program ===
In March 2020, Ring of Pakistan launched ROP Talent Hunting Program 2020, an initiative to identify and develop local Pakistani wrestling talent and to develop interest of youth in wrestling.

=== Season 3 : Flood Relief Initiative (2022) ===
Following a gap since 2019, Ring of Pakistan announced its third season of live events in October 2022. The promotion declared that a portion of proceeds from the events would go toward relief for victims of Pakistan's devastating 2022 floods as this year was worst for people of Pakistan, many cities were completely drenced in water due to heavy rains, floods.

A launch press conference was held on 4 October 2022 at DHA Arena, Multan, followed by another press conference on 6 October 2022 at Serena Hotel, Islamabad. The wrestlers also visited a flood relief camp in Rajanpur to show solidarity with flood victims.

The third season featured events in Multan (DHA Arena, 17–18 December 2022).

The 2022 roster included:

- Chris Masters (USA) - former WWE superstar
- Kalisto (USA) - former WWE superstar
- Tiny Iron (Andrew Harrison, UK)
- Mariah May (UK) - later signed by All Elite Wrestling (AEW)
- Sam Gradwell (UK)
- Adam Flex Maxted (UK)
- Amale Dib (France) - later signed by WWE NXT
- Ludovic Vaillant (France)
- Bernard Vandamme (Belgium)
- Krampus (Germany)
- Badshah Pehalwan Khan (Pakistan/France) - reigning ROP Heavyweight Champion

ROP CEO Imran Shah stated that the event aimed to bring smiles to people who were affected by flood.

== Championships ==
=== ROP World Heavyweight Championship ===
The ROP World Heavyweight Championship is the top title in Ring of Pakistan.

Reign	Champion	Date Won	Event / Notes
1	Badshah Pehalwan Khan	9 December 2018	Defeated Chris Masters, Alhamra Cultural Complex, Lahore
(retained)	Badshah Pehalwan Khan	August 2019	ROP Fest 2019, Islamabad
(retained)	Badshah Pehalwan Khan	December 2022	Season 3, Multan

== Events ==
Season	Date(s)	City / Venue	Key Wrestlers
ROP 2018	7 December 2018	Karachi - KMC Sports Complex	Chris Masters, Ho Ho Lun, Tiny Iron, Tom La Ruffa
ROP 2018	9 December 2018	Lahore - Alhamra Art Centre	Chris Masters, Tiny Iron, KC Spinelli, Ho Ho Lun
ROP Fest 2019	28–30 August 2019	Islamabad - Pakistan Sports Complex	Chris Masters, Tiny Iron, Drake Destroyer, So Cal Val
ROP Season 3	17–18 December 2022	Multan - DHA Arena	Chris Masters, Kalisto, Mariah May, Tiny Iron, Sam Gradwell, Amale Dib
ROP Season 3	December 2022	Karachi	International roster
ROP Season 3	December 2022	Islamabad	International roster

== Notable Wrestlers ==
The following international wrestlers have participated in Ring of Pakistan events:

Wrestler	Nationality	Seasons	Notable Background
Badshah Pehalwan Khan	Pakistani (based in France)	2018, 2019, 2022	ROP Heavyweight Champion; born in Wah Cantt Rawalpindi division; debuted 2012; signed with Wrestling Stars (Catch WS) France 2014
Chris Masters (Chris Adonis)	American	2018, 2019, 2022	Former WWE superstar
Tiny Iron (Andrew Harrison)	British	2018, 2019, 2022	Professional wrestler
Mariah May	British	2022	Later signed by All Elite Wrestling (AEW)
Amale Dib	French	2022	Later signed by WWE NXT
Kalisto	American	2022	Former WWE superstar
Sam Gradwell	British	2022	Professional wrestler
Ho Ho Lun (Wong Yuk Lun)	Hong Konger	2018	Former WWE NXT participant
KC Spinelli (Natalie Harrison)	Canadian	2018	Professional wrestler
Tom La Ruffa (Sylvester Lefort)	French	2018	Former WWE NXT superstar
Timm Wylie (Tim Tango)	British	2018	Professional wrestler
Bernard Vandamme	Belgian	2018	Professional wrestler and singer
Yacine Osmani	Algerian	2018	Won 2018 Lahore Battle Royal
Ludovic Vaillant	French	2022	Professional wrestler
Adam Flex Maxted	British	2019, 2022	Professional wrestler
Heddi Karaoui (Cyanide)	French	2018	Professional wrestler
Jonny Loquasto	American	2018	Hollywood actor and TV host; served as event host

== Media Coverage ==
=== Pakistani Media ===
Ring of Pakistan has received coverage from major Pakistani media outlets, including Dawn, Geo News, Geo Super, The News International, The Express Tribune, Dunya News, Business Recorder, UrduPoint, ProPakistani and Radio Pakistan.

=== International Broadcast Media ===
The promotion attracted coverage from major international broadcasters:

- BBC News Global : A television interview with ROP Managing Director Imran Shah and wrestler Timm Wylie was conducted by journalist Matthew Amroliwala.
- ITV News London : A television segment featuring wrestler Tiny Iron was broadcast, with journalist Lucrezia Millarini reporting.
- Fox Sports Asia : Coverage of Season 2K18, published 24 November 2018.

=== UK Asian and International Print Media ===
- Eastern Eye (UK) : "Wrestling Slams Into Pakistan" by Keerthi Mohan, 30 November 2018.
- DESIblitz (UK) : "Ring of Pakistan Wrestling Season 2K18: Fight For Peace" (1 December 2018).

=== Wrestling Media ===
Outlet	Article	Date
WrestlingINC.com	"Former WWE Star Participating In Wrestling Tournament In Pakistan"	23 November 2018
411Mania	"Former WWE Stars Currently In Pakistan For Independent Event"	December 2022
Sportskeeda	"Pro Wrestling News: Former WWE Star Competing in Tournament in Pakistan"	November 2018
Sportskeeda	"Chris Masters, Ho Ho Lun, KC Spinelli and Sylvester Lefort at Ring of Pakistan Show"	23 December 2018
WrestleMap	"Ring of Pakistan Set to Launch Third Season of Live Wrestling Events"	13 October 2022

=== Television ===
Ring of Pakistan Season 2K18 was broadcast on Hum TV in two episodes covering the Karachi and Lahore shows.

== Objectives and Mission ==
Ring of Pakistan was founded with multiple stated objectives:

1. To promote professional wrestling in Pakistan.
2. To highlight positive image of Pakistan to the world.
3. To provide platform for Pakistani youth
4. To encourage international athletes to visit Pakistan, show them the real hospitality of Pakistani people.
5. To spread the message of peace

The promotion has consistently positioned its events around themes of peace (2018: #FightForPeace), national solidarity (2019: dedicated to Kashmiris) and humanitarian support (2022: flood relief fundraising).
