= Geo Entertainment =

Pakistani entertainment television channel

- Live every moment
- Country: Pakistan
- Network: Jang Media Group
- Headquarters: Karachi, Sindh, Pakistan

Programming
- Language: Urdu
- Picture format: (1080i 16:9, MPEG-4 HDTV)

Ownership
- Owner: Mir Shakil-ur-Rahman; Jang Media Group; Mir Ibrahim Rahman
- Key people: Abdullah Kadwani (GMD); Asad Qureshi (COO)
- Sister channels: List: Geo News Geo Super Geo Tez Geo Kahani Geo Middle East

History
- Launched: August 2002; 24 years ago

Links
- Website: harpalgeo.tv

Availability

Streaming media
- HarPal Geo Live: harpalgeo.tv/live

Geo Entertainment or Har Pal Geo is a Pakistani entertainment television channel established by Geo Television Network in May 2002. Its test transmission started on 14 August 2002 on the PAS 10 digital satellite whereas on 1 October 2002 the regular transmission of Geo Entertainment was started.

== History ==
Established in 2002, Geo is among the oldest Pakistani private TV networks, and has received good TRPs on various daily soaps, reality series, and drama serials since its inception. Geo broadcast many daily soaps during its initial years and the soaps became popular too. Some shows from the 2000s that aired on the network which are still recognized include Tere Pehlu Main, Meri Zaat Zarra-e-Benishan, Kaash Main Teri Beti Na Hoti, Tum Ho Kay Chup, Doraha, Yeh Zindagi Hai and various more.

The channel continued to do well in ratings but in 2014 the network was banned in the country for promoting blasphemy on its morning show Utho Jago Pakistan. The channel was eventually unbanned but the ratings took a hit and the channel was panned for making below average content, and it took a while for the channel to get back onto the charts with well ratings. In 2017, GEO launched Khaani and the series went on to become a huge success for the network with worldwide success and was later added on Netflix due to its major popularity. Similarly, around the same time Ghar Titli Ka Par was also a big success for the network domestically and garnered many views on YouTube as well. The two drama serials helped GEO break ground just like it did before its ban and become the most viewed channel in Pakistan. Since that time, Geo joined hands with 7th Sky Entertainment and has produced various shows that have been record-breaking on television and social media platforms.

In 2019, the network created two records for the most watched show in the 9:00 pm slot with the beginning of Bharosa Pyar Tera and ending of Dil-e-Gumshuda, both the series garnered 17.0 TRP In 2020, Munafiq created a record for the most watched show in the 7:00 pm slot with 22.75 TRP, and is also the second highest rated serial in the history of Pakistani television, as well as being in the top trending list in India on YouTube. In recent times, criticism of Geo Entertainment includes the flak for its low picture quality on television compared to HUM HD and ARY Digital HD , which are of higher quality, and making very Indian-ized dramas by copying daily soaps from Indian networks and turning them into weekly drama serials or daily soaps as well in order to get ratings.

After the Pakistan Stock Exchange attack in July 2020, the attacker's car was found in a later episode of the channel's show, Deewangi and sparked a reaction from audiences due to the strange coincidence.

== Programming ==
Popular programming which have gotten ratings as well as international popularity in recent years includes: Mohabbat Tumse Nafrat Hai, Piya Naam Ka Diya, Ramz-e-Ishq, Yaariyan, Meharposh, Aye Dil Tu Bata, Deewangi, Kahin Deep Jalay, Rang Mahal, Khuda Aur Muhabbat and many more. The network also has various series on Amazon Prime Video such as Hiddat and Yaar-e-Bewafa.
