= Daily Jang =

Daily Urdu-language newspaper published from Pakistan

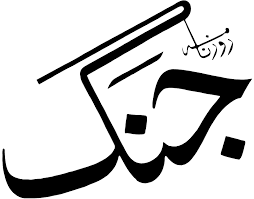

- Front page of Karachi edition (1 January 2015)
- Type: Daily newspaper
- Format: Broadsheet
- Owner: Jang Group of Newspapers
- Founder: Mir Khalil-ur-Rehman
- Editor-in-chief: Mir Shakil-ur-Rahman
- Founded: 1939; 87 years ago
- Political alignment: Conservatism
- Language: Urdu language
- Headquarters: Karachi, Sindh, Pakistan
- Circulation: 850,000
- Sister newspapers: The News International; Daily News; Daily Awam
- ISSN: 1563-8731 (print); 1563-8723 (web)
- OCLC number: 1781424
- Website: jang.com.pk

The Daily Jang (Urdu: روزنامہ جنگ, romanized: Rozanamah Jang) is an Urdu-language newspaper headquartered in Karachi, Pakistan. It is considered one of Pakistan's newspapers of record and a leading newspaper of Pakistan. It is the most-circulated print newspaper in the country.

== History ==
It is the oldest newspaper of Pakistan in continuous publication since its foundation in 1939 from Delhi, British India, first published in 1941 during World War II, hence the name Jang, translated as "war" in Urdu. After the independence of Pakistan in 1947, then young Mir Khalil-ur-Rehman became one of the pioneering publishers in Karachi.

Its current group chief executive and editor-in-chief is Mir Shakil-ur-Rahman. Past editors and contributors have included Mahmood Shaam, Nazir Naji and Shafi Aqeel.

== List of columnists ==
Its list of columnists includes Irshad Ahmed Haqqani, Saleem Safi, Hassan Nisar, Ghazi Salahuddin, Wajahat Masood, Hafeez Ullah Niazi, Irshad Bhatti, Mazhar Barlas, Ata ul Haq Qasmi, Ansar Abbasi, Anwar Ghazi, Ali Moeen Nawazish, and Yasir Pirzada.

== Newspaper's publisher ==
Jang is published by the Jang Group of Newspapers. It was originally published as a weekly to raise political awareness among Muslims living in British India. It is published from Karachi, Lahore, Rawalpindi, Quetta, Multan and London.
