= Shafi Aqeel =

Pakistani journalist, poet, writer

- Born: 1930
- Died: 6 September 2013 (aged 83)
- Occupations: Journalist, writer, poet
- Notable work: Popular Folk Tales of the Punjab
- Awards: Tamgha-e-Imtiaz (Medal of Excellence) by the President of Pakistan in 2004

Shafi Aqeel (1930 – 6 September 2013) was a Pakistani journalist, writer, poet, art critic and translator.

He had edited and co-edited a number of magazines, and contributed columns on art and literature to the national Urdu language newspaper Daily Jang.

== Education and early life ==
Shafi Aqeel was born in 1930, close to Saddar Bazaar, Lahore. Aqeel did not have formal education, learning to read the Quran at mosque. About his early life, he said, "Poverty is nothing to abhor or be ashamed of. Rather, it may work as a stimulus. I think if I hadn't been poor, I wouldn't have achieved what I have." Aqeel served in the National Guard. While working for the guards, Aqeel was witness to extreme scenes of poverty including the spread of cholera amongst migrants. Aqeel received no pay and even had to bring food from home. In later years, he completed the Munshi-Fazil and Adeeb-Fazil exams.

== Writing career ==
His first article appeared in the Zamindar newspaper in 1947, and he changed his name from Mohammad Shafi to Shafi Aqeel. It was the result of his outpouring on the then raging issue of Ilm-ud-din (Shaheed). He did not have a traditional teacher for poetry, which he initiated in 1948 but began composing in earnest in 1957. "I think anybody with 'mauzoon tabiyat' — a particular bent of mind for poetry – can judge for himself whether the metre and rhyme of his lines is correct" he said. Aqeel migrated to Karachi in January 1950 in search of a living. He worked as a sign-painter and for various magazines and newspapers in different capacities, including Majeed Lahori's Namakdan, where he worked as an assistant editor. Later he got the job of a magazine editor with a salary of Rs 60 per month.

He also wrote short stories and a novel. His first collection of short stories, published in 1952, titled Bhookay (Hungry), landed him in trouble with the authorities, who declared it obscene and put the author on trial under Obscenity Law (Section 292) in Lahore while he lived in Karachi. He called the newspaper editor Maulana Abdul Majeed Salik, journalist Agha Shorish Kashmiri and writer and playwright Saadat Hasan Manto as his defense witnesses. The trial took two and a half years.

In 1951, Shafi Aqeel become editor of the newly published children's magazine Bhaijaan. Shafi Aqeel also worked for the famous monthly magazine Adab-i-Lateef. He was also an art critic and said to be friends with many artists including Sadequain and Ahmed Pervez, poets and writers like Faiz Ahmed Faiz, Sufi Ghulam Mustafa Tabassum and Hafeez Jalandhari, his insight into the world of art was called "exemplary" by poet and drama director Ayub Khawar. He edited and co-edited a number of magazines, and contributed columns on art and literature to the national Urdu-language newspaper Daily Jang.

Aqeel wrote 30 books in Urdu and Punjabi, two of which were collections of his poetry written in Punjabi.

He wrote book reviews for the Daily Jang right up until his death, which were described by art critic Quddus Mirza writing in artnow as "frank, candid and cruel to some extent".

== Awards and recognition ==
Shafi Aqeel received a number of awards for his work during his lifetime:

- Dawood Literary Prize by the Pakistan Writers' Guild in 1968
- Habib Literary Prize by the Pakistan Writers' Guild in 1976
- Best Book Award by the Pakistan Book Council in 1977
- Khushal Khan Khattak Award, Government of Punjab, Pakistan in 1990
- Sir Abdul Qadir Award by the International Urdu Conference, India in 1990
- Award of Services to the Cause of Freedom of the Press by the Karachi Union of Journalists in 1995
- Best Book Award by the Government of Punjab, Pakistan for the book Sassi Punoon-Hashim Shah in 2002
- Tamgha-e-Imtiaz (Medal of Excellence) by the President of Pakistan in 2004
- Lifetime Achievement Award by the Karachi Press Club in 2005

== Personal life ==
Shafi Aqeel lived a life of celibacy and never got married, about which he said; "The charm of words, though they sit in black on paper, was so absorbing that I did not find time to look elsewhere hard enough".

== Death and tributes ==
Aqeel died at the age of 83 on 7 September 2013. He worked with Daily Jang newspaper for almost sixty years, and was in charge of its literary magazine. He was buried in the cemetery in Paposhnagar, Karachi, Pakistan.

Poet and researcher Aqeel Abbas Jafari said of Shafi Aqeel, "[he] was an amiable man. He admired people with intellect. The fact that he remained associated with one organisation [Jang] for 63 years is a feat in itself. He was a selfless individual too, which is why after his brother-in-law died, he decided not to marry to support his sister."

Former editor of Daily Jang newspaper Mahmood Shaam and professor Sahar Ansari also paid their tributes to him after his death.

== Bibliography ==
- Popular Folk Tales of the Punjab (Translation: Ahmad Bashir)
- Pakistan ki Lok Dastanain / پاکستان کی لوک داستانیں
- Chaar Jadeed Musawwir / چار جدید مصور
- Pakistan Kay Saat Musawwir / پاکستان کے سات مصور
- Do Musawwir: Bashir Mirza aur Azar Zubi / دو مصور: بشیر مرزا اور آذر زوبی
- Namwar Adeebon aur Shayaron ka Bachpan / نامور ادیبوں اور شاعروں کا بچپن
- Musawwari aur Musawwir / مصوری اور مصور
- Cheeni Lok Kahaniyan / چینی لوک کہانیاں
- Irani Lok Kahaniyan / ایرانی لوک کہانیاں
- Punjab kay Paanch Qadeem Sha'ir / پنجاب کے پانچ قدیم شاعر
- Sochaan di Zanjeer (collection of Punjabi poetry)
