= Nazir Naji =

Pakistani journalist and Urdu columnist (died 2024)

- نذیر ناجی
- Died: 21 February 2024; Lahore, Pakistan
- Occupations: Journalist; columnist
- Employers: Daily Jang (until 2012); Daily Dunya (from 2012)
- Known for: Urdu political column writing; chairmanship of Pakistan Academy of Letters
- Awards: Hilal-i-Imtiaz (2012)

Nazir Naji (Urdu: نذیر ناجی; died 21 February 2024) was a Pakistani journalist and Urdu columnist. He served for 27 years as a senior Urdu columnist for Daily Jang. He also served as chairman of the Pakistan Academy of Letters and was awarded the Hilal-i-Imtiaz by the President of Pakistan.

== Career ==
Naji spent 27 years as a senior Urdu columnist at Daily Jang, becoming one of the more prominent political commentators in Pakistani Urdu-language journalism. He also served as chairman of the Pakistan Academy of Letters. In 2012, he left Jang Group and joined Daily Dunya (Roznama Dunya) as Group Editor.

== Death ==
Naji died on 21 February 2024 after a prolonged illness, at a private hospital in Lahore. Funeral prayers were held on 22 February 2024 at Jamia Masjid Madina, Johar Town, Lahore. Punjab Caretaker Chief Minister Mohsin Naqvi and Caretaker Minister for Information Murtaza Solangi both issued condolence statements.

== Awards and recognition ==
Year	Award body	Award	Recipient	Result
2012	President of Pakistan	Hilal-i-Imtiaz	Nazir Naji	Won

The Hilal-i-Imtiaz was conferred at a civil awards ceremony presided over by the President of Pakistan on 23 March 2012.
