= Forbidden Door (2024) =

All Elite Wrestling and New Japan Pro-Wrestling pay-per-view event

AEW x NJPW: Forbidden Door
- Promotional poster featuring various wrestlers
- Promotion(s): All Elite Wrestling; New Japan Pro-Wrestling
- Date: June 30, 2024
- City: Elmont, New York
- Venue: UBS Arena
- Attendance: 11,000
- Buy rate: 125,000

Event chronology
← Previous; AEW: Double or Nothing; NJPW: Fantastica Mania: Mexico	Next → AEW: All In; NJPW: Fantastica Mania USA

Forbidden Door chronology
← Previous; 2023	Next → 2025

The 2024 Forbidden Door was a professional wrestling pay-per-view (PPV) event and supershow co-produced by the American promotion All Elite Wrestling (AEW) and the Japan-based New Japan Pro-Wrestling (NJPW). It was the third annual Forbidden Door event and took place on June 30, 2024, at the UBS Arena in the Long Island hamlet of Elmont, New York. The event also featured the involvement of wrestlers from NJPW's sister promotion World Wonder Ring Stardom, as well as Mexico's Consejo Mundial de Lucha Libre (CMLL), a partner of both AEW and NJPW.

Fifteen matches were contested at the event, including five on Zero Hour pre-show. In the main event, Swerve Strickland defeated Will Ospreay to retain the AEW World Championship. In other prominent matches, Tetsuya Naito defeated Jon Moxley to win the IWGP World Heavyweight Championship, Mercedes Moné defeated Stephanie Vaquer in a Winner Takes All match to retain the AEW TBS Championship and win the NJPW Strong Women's Championship, Jack Perry defeated Konosuke Takeshita, Mark Briscoe, Dante Martin, Lio Rush, and El Phantasmo in a Ladder match to win the vacant AEW TNT Championship, and "Timeless" Toni Storm defeated Mina Shirakawa to retain the AEW Women's World Championship. The event also featured the return of Dr. Britt Baker, D.M.D., who had been on hiatus since September 2023.

== Production ==
=== Background ===
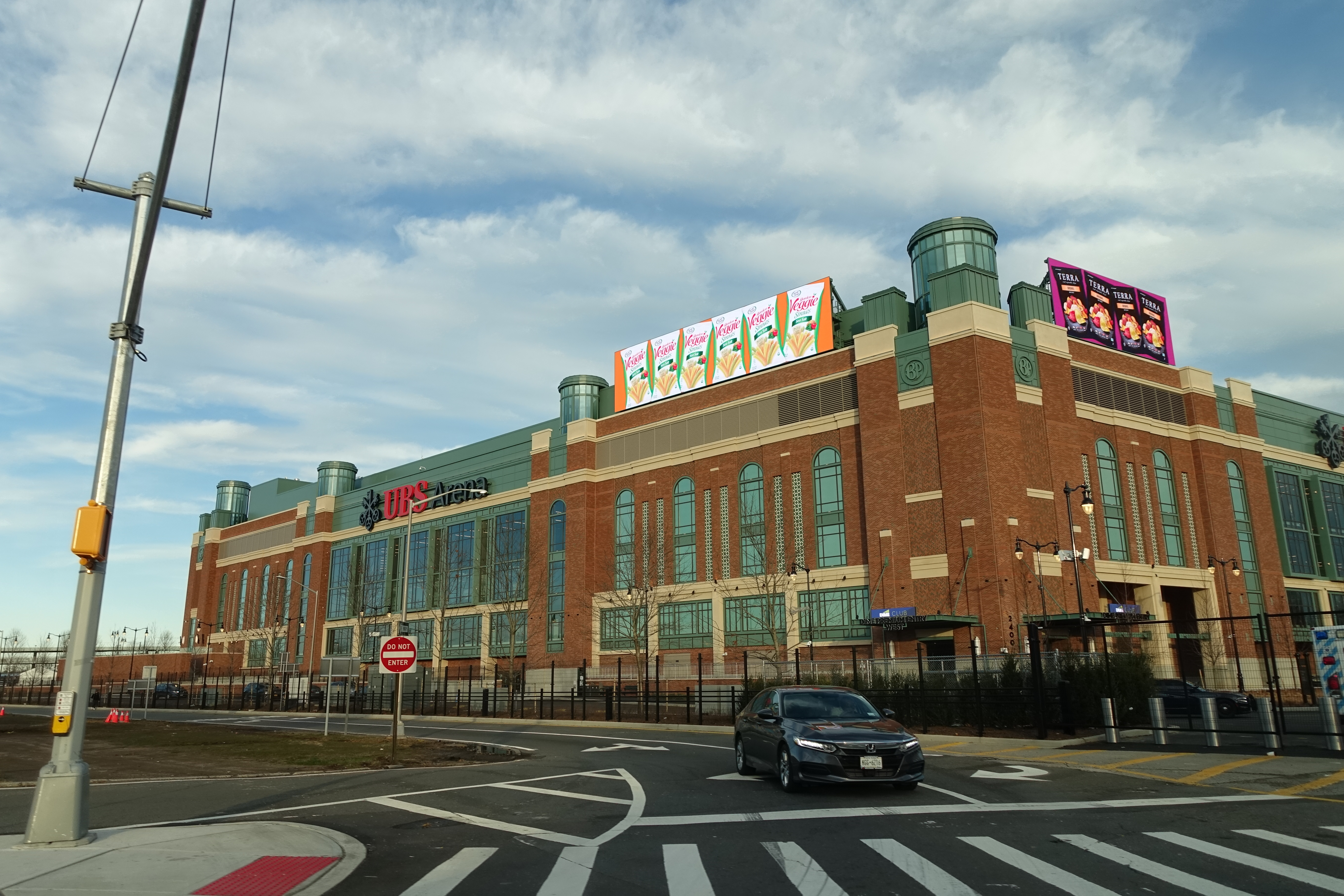
The event was held at the UBS Arena in Elmont, New York.

Forbidden Door is an annual professional wrestling pay-per-view (PPV) event co-produced by the American promotion All Elite Wrestling (AEW) and Japan-based New Japan Pro-Wrestling (NJPW). Established in 2022, the event is held in June and features direct competition between wrestlers from the two companies. The event takes its name from the same term often used by AEW when referring to working with other professional wrestling promotions.

On April 11, 2024, AEW announced that the third Forbidden Door would take place on June 30, 2024, at the UBS Arena in the Long Island hamlet of Elmont, New York. Rocky Romero, who is a vice president for both AEW and NJPW, said that wrestlers from World Wonder Ring Stardom, a women's Japanese company and sister promotion of NJPW, would also take part in the 2024 event. He also said that wrestlers from the Mexican partner promotion Consejo Mundial de Lucha Libre (CMLL) would be involved.

=== Storylines ===
Forbidden Door featured professional wrestling matches that involved different wrestlers from pre-existing scripted feuds and storylines. Storylines were primarily advanced on AEW's weekly television shows Dynamite, Rampage, and Collision, the YouTube series Being The Dark Order, and also at NJPW, Stardom, and CMLL events.

During the May 22 episode of Dynamite, it was announced that on the following week's episode, a Casino Gauntlet match would be held to determine who would challenge Swerve Strickland for the AEW World Championship at Forbidden Door. The match was won by Will Ospreay.

At Double or Nothing, Adam Copeland legitimately injured his leg in his successful title defense of the AEW TNT Championship. On the following episode of Dynamite, AEW executive vice presidents The Young Bucks (Matthew Jackson and Nicholas Jackson) stripped Copeland of the title due to the injury. As they were about to award the championship to their Elite stablemate Jack Perry, Christopher Daniels—who had been fired by the Bucks two weeks prior—appeared, revealing that AEW president Tony Khan had reinstated him as an interim executive vice president in the absence of Kenny Omega, who had surgery due to diverticulitis, and that any announcement made by Daniels came directly from Khan. Daniels then announced that the TNT Championship would not be handed to Perry and instead, the next champion would be determined by a ladder match at Forbidden Door and the six participants would come from qualifying matches over the next few weeks. The first qualifying match took place on that week's episode of Rampage, where Konosuke Takeshita defeated Penta El Zero Miedo. Mark Briscoe then qualified on the next week's Dynamite by defeating Brian Cage. Perry qualified next by defeating Dustin Rhodes on the June 12 episode of Dynamite, followed by Dante Martin defeating Lee Moriarty on the June 15 episode of Collision. Lio Rush then qualified on the June 21 episode of Rampage by defeating Action Andretti. El Phantasmo earmed the final spot in the ladder match by defeating AR Fox on the June 28 episode of Rampage.

Following her successful defense of the AEW TBS Championship on the May 29 episode of Dynamite, Mercedes Moné was interrupted by NJPW Strong Women's Champion Stephanie Vaquer, who performs in NJPW, Stardom, and CMLL. The two subsequently stared each other down while holding their respective titles up. The following week, it was announced that the two would face each other at Forbidden Door in a Winner Takes All match for both championships. Before that, however, Moné was scheduled to defend the TBS Championship against Vaquer's CMLL World Women's Tag Team Championship partner Zeuxis on the June 12 episode of Dynamite and it was announced that if Moné lost her title to Zeuxis, then the Forbidden Door match would only be for Vaquer's Strong Women's Championship; Moné retained.

Prior to signing with AEW in November 2023, Mariah May performed in Stardom where she teamed together with Mina Shirakawa as part of Club Venus. After signing with AEW, May became a protege of AEW Women's World Champion "Timeless" Toni Storm, who also previously performed in Stardom from 2016 to 2019. Storm made a surprise appearance at Stardom American Dream on April 4 after a Club Venus match and teased a match at Forbidden Door; in return, Shirakawa made her first appearance in AEW on the April 10 episode of Dynamite, saving May from a post-match beatdown before kissing her. Over the next two months, Shirakawa would periodically appear on AEW shows and compete with Storm for May's affection. During Stardom's June 2 event, Storm, along with May, appeared in a vignette where Storm said she had been observing Shirakawa and while she also considered Shirakawa a friend due to her friendship with May, Storm wanted to challenge Shirakawa to a match at Forbidden Door with the AEW Women's World Championship on the line. Shirakawa accepted the challenge and the match was made official on the June 5 episode of Dynamite, with May listed as the cornerwoman for both participants upon her request.

At Forbidden Door in 2023, AEW's Orange Cassidy won a four-man match which also involved NJPW's Zack Sabre Jr. The following year on the June 8, 2024, episode of Collision, Sabre challenged Cassidy to a rematch as a singles match at Forbidden Door, claiming the two men had unfinished business.

At NJPW's Windy City Riot in April, AEW's Jon Moxley defeated NJPW's Tetsuya Naito to win the IWGP World Heavyweight Championship. After retaining the title at NJPW's Dominion on June 9, Moxley cut a promo for anyone to challenge him. Naito came out to confront Moxley, and a rematch for the title was set for Forbidden Door.

At Double or Nothing, MJF made a surprise return from injury after being out since Worlds End in December 2023. He subsequently made his first appearance back on Dynamite on the June 5 episode where he badmouthed The Elite. Following MJF's match on the June 19 episode, Cage of Agony (Brian Cage, Toa Liona, and Bishop Kaun) and CMLL's Hechicero appeared on the titantron. Cage subsequently announced that The Elite had a gift for MJF and it was that he would be facing Hechicero in MJF's hometown at Forbidden Door.

The Owen Hart Cup is an annual professional wrestling tournament held by AEW in partnership with The Owen Hart Foundation in honor of Owen Hart. It consists of two single-elimination tournaments, one each for men and women, and the respective winners receive a trophy called "The Owen". Additionally, for 2024, it was announced that the respective winners would earn matches for AEW's men's and women's world championships at All In in August. During the June 19 episode of Dynamite, it was announced that AEW's Bryan Danielson would face NJPW's Shingo Takagi at Forbidden Door in a first-round tournament match.

== Event ==
Other on-screen personnel
Role	Name
Commentators	Excalibur (Pre-show and PPV)
Commentators	Taz (PPV)
Commentators	Nigel McGuinness (Pre-show and PPV)
Commentators	Matt Menard (Pre-show)
Commentators	Jim Ross (last 2 matches)
Spanish commentators	Alvaro Riojas
Spanish commentators	Carlos Cabrera
Spanish commentators	Ariel Levy
Ring announcers	Justin Roberts (PPV)
Ring announcers	Bobby Cruise (Pre-show)
Ring announcers	Arkady Aura (Pre-show)
Ring announcers	Takuro Shibata (Pre-show and PPV)
Referees	Aubrey Edwards
Referees	Bryce Remsburg
Referees	Mike Posey
Referees	Paul Turner
Referees	Rick Knox
Referees	Stephon Smith
Referees	Red Shoes Unno
Pre-show hosts	Renee Paquette
Pre-show hosts	RJ City
Pre-show hosts	Jeff Jarrett
Pre-show hosts	Rocky Romero

=== Pre-show ===
There were five matches contested on the Zero-Hour pre-show. In the opener, ROH World Television Champion Kyle Fletcher faced Serpentico. In the closing stages, Fletcher delivered a big boot and a tombstone piledriver. Fletcher then delivered a turnbuckle brainbuster to Serpentico and pinned him to win the match.

Next, Kings of the Black Throne (Malakai Black and Brody King) faced Kyle O'Reilly and Tomohiro Ishii, Private Party (Zay and Quen), and Roderick Strong and NJPW Strong Openweight Champion Gabe Kidd (accompanied by Gedo and The Undisputed Kingdom – ROH World Tag Team Champions Matt Taven and Mike Bennett). In the closing stages, Zay delivered a diving crossbody to Kidd for a two-count. Ishii delivered a massive brainbuster to King, but Quen broke up the pin attempt. Private Party then delivered double tope suicidas to all the teams on the outside. Private Party attempted the Silly String on Black, but Black escaped and delivered a jumping knee strike on Zay and King hit the Gonzo Bomb on the latter for the win.

Following that, a tag team match between Tam Nakano and Willow Nightingale, and Kris Statlander and Momo Watanabe (accompanied by Stokely Hathaway). In the opening stages, Statlander delivered a delayed vertical suplex to Nakano for a two-count. Nakano hit a roundhouse kick on Statlander and tagged in Willow, who delivered a big boot and a spinebuster, but Statlander responded with a discus lariat on Willow. Nakano tagged in and Statlander delivered a German suplex to Nakano for a two-count. Willow delivered an avalanche Death Valley Driver to Momo for a two-count. Willow then hit the Pounce on Momo and tagged in Nakano, who performed a hammerlock German suplex on Momo and pinned her to win the match for her team.

Following that, Mariah May (accompanied by AEW Women's World Champion "Timeless" Toni Storm and Luther) faced Saraya (accompanied by Harley Cameron) in the Women's Owen Hart Foundation tournament quarterfinals, with the winner facing Hikaru Shida on Rampage: Beach Break. In the opening stages, Mariah hit the Mariah-Go-Round on Saraya and delivered a missile dropkick. Mariah delivered a headbutt and a running corner hip attack to Saraya. Saraya then hit a neckbreaker on Mariah for a two-count, as Mariah touched the ropes. Saraya then attempted the Ram-Paige, but Mariah reversed it into an inside cradle for the win.

In the final match of the Zero-Hour pre-show, The Lucha Brothers (Penta El Zero Miedo and Rey Fénix) and CMLL's Místico (accompanied by Alex Abrahantes) faced NJPW's Los Ingobernables de Japón (Hiromu Takahashi, Titán and Yota Tsuji). In the closing stages, Místico delivered a senton to Takahashi. Takahashi responded with a powerbomb off the apron onto the floor to Místico. Titán then delivered a diving splash to Místico for a two-count. Penta then delivered slingblades to LIJ and hit a Canadian Destroyer on Takahashi. The Lucha Brothers then hit the Fear Factor on Takahashi and Místico locked in La Mística on Titán, forcing him to tap out for the win.

=== Preliminary matches ===
In the opening match of the pay-per-view, MJF faced CMLL's Hechicero. In the opening stages, Hechicero performed an arm breaker over the top rope and hit a Mad Scientist Bomb on MJF for a two-count. Hechicero delivered a running corner knee strike and locked in a double armbar, but MJF reached the ropes. MJF then delivered the Panama Sunrise and a sheer-drop brainbuster on Hechicero for the win.

Next, The Elite (AEW Continental Champion Kazuchika Okada and AEW World Tag Team Champions The Young Bucks – Matthew Jackson and Nicholas Jackson) faced Scissor Ace (Hiroshi Tanahashi and The Acclaimed – Max Caster and Anthony Bowens). In the opening stages, The Acclaimed performed double Scissor Me Timbers on The Bucks. Okada delivered an Air Raid Crash neckbreaker to Caster. Caster delivered a diving crossbody to Nicholas and tagged in Bowens, who delivered a Fameasser and a superkick to Nicholas. Tanahashi and Okada tagged in and Tanahashi delivered a bodyslam and a middle-rope senton to Okada for a two-count. Tanahashi hit a dragon screw leg whip on Okada, but Matthew immediately hit a superkick on Tanahashi. Caster hit a slingblade on Matthew, Nicholas delivered a DDT to Caster, Bowens hit a rolling elbow strike on Nicholas and Okada delivered an uppercut to Bowens. The Acclaimed then delivered The Arrival/Mic Drop combination on Okada. Tanahashi attempted the High Fly Flow, but The Bucks stopped him. The Bucks then performed a double plancha to the outside onto The Acclaimed. Okada delivered a diving elbow drop to Tanahashi, but Tanahashi reversed it into an inside cradle for a two-count. Okada landed a dropkick on Tanahashi and delivered the Rainmaker lariat for the win.

Next, Bryan Danielson faced Shingo Takagi in the Men's Owen Hart Foundation tournament quarterfinals match, with the winner facing Pac in the semifinals on Dynamite: Beach Break. In the opening stages, Danielson locked in a STF, but Takagi escaped and delivered a senton. Danielson delivered a diving clothesline and a running dropkick; Danielson attempted a suicide dive, but his feet got caught in the ropes and Takagi used that opportunity to land a DDT on the apron to Danielson. Takagi delivered a suplex to Danielson back in the ring and attempted a german suplex, but Danielson escaped and landed a german suplex of his own. Danielson delivers a running corner dropkick to Takagi and places him on the top rope and lands an avalanche back suplex. Takagi attempted a flying clothesline, but Danielson caught him into a triangle choke. Takagi escaped with a Death Valley Driver and delivered a Pumping Bomber lariat in the corner, a superplex and a sliding lariat for a two-count. Takagi attempted the Made in Japan, but Danielson escaped. Takagi planted him with a Pumping Bomber and then hit the Made in Japan for a massive nearfall. Takagi attempted another sliding lariat, but Danielson escaped and locked in a Fujiwara armbar. Takagi escaped and headbutted Danielson. Danielson responded with a Regal Plex and the Busaiku Knee for a nearfall. Danielson then locked in a triangle Fujiwara armbar, forcing Takagi to tap out, and thus Danielson advanced to the semifinals.

Next, "Timeless" Toni Storm (accompanied by Luther) defended the AEW Women's World Championship against Stardom's Mina Shirakawa, with Mariah May supporting both competitors. In the opening stages, Storm delivered a backstabber and a Perfect Plex to Mina for a two-count. On the outside, Storm attempted a running hip attack to Mina on the steel steps, but Mina moved out of the way. Mina then performed a diving crossbody from the top rope onto Luther and Storm on the outside. Storm attempted a running corner hip attack to Mina back in the ring, but Mina impeded her with a dropkick to the knee and delivered an electric chair facebuster. Mina locked in a figure four leglock on Storm, but Storm managed to reach the ropes. Mina then delivered a diving DDT and another DDT to Storm for a two-count. Mina attempted the Glamorous Driver MINA, but Storm escaped and hit a snap german suplex and a running corner hip attack for a two-count. Mina performed the Glamorous Collection MINA on Storm for a two-count. Mina hit a spinning backfist, a rolling elbow and the Glamorous Driver MINA, but Storm kicked out for a nearfall. Mina landed a roundhouse kick on Storm, but Storm managed to sneak an inside cradle for a two-count; Storm then headbutted Mina, delivered a german suplex and the Storm Zero to retain her title. Post-match, Mariah, Storm and Mina embraced and kissed each other.

Next, NJPW's Zack Sabre Jr. clashed with Orange Cassidy. In the opening stages, Cassidy performed a running dropkick and a plancha to the outside on Sabre Jr.. Cassidy attemfoed a diving crossbody back in the ring, but Sabre Jr. caught him; Cassidy escaped and hit a dragon screw leg whip and a Michinoku Driver for a two-count. Cassidy then hit a diving DDT on Sabre Jr. for a two-count. Cassidy attempted the Beach Break, but Sabre Jr. reversed it into an armbar, which forced Cassidy to reach the ropes. Cassidy then hit Beach Break on Sabre Jr. for a two-count and then an Orange Punch. Cassidy attempted a mousetrap pin, but Sabre Jr. reversed it into a grapevine armbar, forcing Cassidy to tap out.

Next, Samoa Joe, Hook and Katsuyori Shibata took on NJPW World Television Champion Jeff Cobb and The Learning Tree (FTW Champion Chris Jericho and Big Bill) (accompanied by Bryan Keith). In the opening stages, Joe delivered a series of punches, a shoulder tackle and a corner enzeguiri to Cobb. Hook tagged in and Cobb delivered a body slam and a standing moonsault for a two-count. Shibata tagged in and Cobb landed a spinebuster, but Shibata responded with a PK for a two-count. Shibata attempted an armbar on Cobb, but Big Bill broke up the submission attempt with an elbow drop. Jericho tagged in and attempted a Lionsault, but Shibata got his knees up. Shibata attempted a tag to Joe, but Big Bill pushed Joe down, allowing Bryan Keith to deliver a low blow to Shibata and Jericho lock in the Walls of Jericho, forcing Shibata to reach the ropes and tag Hook. Big Bill delivered a chokeslam to Joe, Shibata delivered an STO to Big Bill and a spinning back suplex to Cobb, Hook landed a T-bone suplex on Jericho, but Jericho responded with a Codebreaker for a two-count. Hook then locked in the RedRum on Jericho, while Shibata and Joe locked in a sleeper hold and the Coquina Clutch on Cobb and Big Bill respectively. Hook released the RedRum, delivered a T-Bone suplex and the Judas Effect to Jericho for the win.

The next match was a ladder match for the vacant AEW TNT Championship contested between Jack Perry, Konosuke Takeshita, NJPW's El Phantasmo, Lio Rush, ROH World Champion Mark Briscoe and Dante Martin. In the opening stages, El Phantasmo delivered an Argentine neckbreaker to Rush through a ladder. Dante then delivered a diving crossbody to El Phantasmo from a ladder. Takeshita threw a ladder into Dante and landed a brainbuster to the latter onto a ladder. Briscoe then set up a table, placed Takeshita on top of it, placed a ladder on top of Takeshita and performed a tope con gilo over the top rope onto Takeshita through the table. Briscoe then set up a ladder on the apron and Rush delivered a suicide dive to Takeshita in between the ladder. Briscoe then delivered a diving splash to Perry through a table. Rush and Dante are on top of the ladder, but Takeshita grabs Dante and powerbombs him. Takeshita then delivered a Last Ride powerbomb to Rush through a ladder in the corner. El Phantasmo delivered two superkicks to Takeshita, but Takeshita responded with a Powerdrive Knee. Takeshita then delivered a Blue Thunder Bomb to El Phantasmo through a table on the outside. Briscoe then set up a ladder and delivered the Jay Driller to Takeshita onto the ladder off an already set-up ladder. Briscoe then started climbing the ladder to retrieve the title, but Perry stopped him and threw a ladder on him. Perry then beat Briscoe with a chair and proceeded to climb the ladder and retrieved the championship, thus making him the youngest AEW TNT Champion.

The next match was a Winner Takes All match for both the AEW TBS Championship and NJPW Strong Women's Championship between Mercedes Moné (TBS) and CMLL's Stephanie Vaquer (NJPW). In the opening stages, Moné performed a meteora from the middle rope and attempted a swinging DDT on the outside, but Vaquer blocked it and threw her into the LED board. Vaquer then delivered a springboard crossbody to Moné foot a two-count. Vaquer attempted a diving crossbody, but Moné impeded it with a dropkick in mid-air. Moné attempted the Three Amigos, but Vaquer countered it with a headscissors takedown into a cradle stretch submission hold, but Moné reached the ropes. Moné then delivered two running double knees in the corner to Vaquer and a tornado DDT for a two-count. Moné attempted the Moné Maker, but Vaquer escaped and hit a fireman's carry gutbuster. Moné delivered two Backstabbers and attempted a frog splash, but Vaquer got her knees up and delivered a dragon screw leg whip. Vaquer then delivered a running double knee in the corner and attempted the package backbreaker, but Moné escaped and hit the Moné Maker. Moné then locked in the Bank Statement, forcing Vaquer to tap out and thus, Moné retained the TBS Championship and won the Strong Women's Championship. After the match, Dr. Britt Baker, D.M.D. made her return for the first time in 11 months and stared down Moné.

In the penultimate match, Jon Moxley defended the IWGP World Heavyweight Championship against Tetsuya Naito. In the opening stages, Moxley delivered a piledriver and a saito suplex to Naito for a two-count. Naito delivered a running back elbow and a neckbreaker for a two-count. Moxley delivered a running knee strike for a two-count and attempted a figure four leglock, but Naito reversed it into an inside cradle for a two-count. Naito attempted a top-rope hurricarana, but Moxley transitioned it into a powerbomb for a two-count. Moxley attempted the Death Rider, but Naito escaped and hit a springboard swinging DDT. Naito attempted the Destino, but Moxley ducked and locked in a sleeper hold. Naito escaped and hit the Destino. Natio attempted another Destino, but Moxley stopped it and hit the Paradigm Shift. Naito landed an enzeguiri on Moxley, but Moxley responded with a lariat and then the Death Rider for a massive nearfall. Moxley attempted another Death Rider, but Naito escaped and delivered another Destino. Naito then delivered a Northern Lights Bomb and another Destino. Naito covered Moxley for the three-count to win back the IWGP World Heavyweight Championship.

=== Main event ===
In the main event, Swerve Strickland (accompanied by Prince Nana) defended the AEW World Championship against AEW International Champion Will Ospreay. In the opening stages, Ospreay delivered a plancha over the top rope to Swerve and hit a running dropkick in between the ropes on the latter. Swerve delivered a diving European uppercut and three neckbreakers. Ospreay then delivered a handspring enzeguiri and a hurricarana to Swerve onto the floor. Back in the ring, Ospreay hit the Phenomenal Forearm on Swerve for a two-count. Ospreay delivered a Styles Clash to Swerve for a two-count. Ospreay attempted the OsCutter, but Swerve impeded it with a Swerve Stomp. Swerve hit a backbreaker and an avalanche Olympic Slam on Ospreay for another two-count. Swerve attempted an apron brainbuster, but Ospreay escaped and attempted the OsCutter to Swerve on the apron, but Swerve moved out of the way. Swerve then hit a Swerve Stomp to Ospreay onto the announce table. Swerve then delivered a piledriver to Ospreay onto the guardrail. Back in the ring, Swerve hit a Michinoku Driver on Ospreay for a massive nearfall. Swerve attended another Swerve Stomp, but Ospreay rigged the ropes. Ospreay then delivered two consecutive OsCutters for a nearfall. Ospreay then hit the Stormbreaker for a two-count. Ospreay attempted the Tiger Driver '91, but Swerve escaped. Ospreay headbutted Swerve and attempted the Tiger Driver '91 again, but Swerve reversed it into a cradle pin for a two-count. Swerve then hit the Hidden Blade on Ospreay and attempted the Swerve Stomp, but Ospreay ducked. Ospreay attempted the Hidden Blade, but Swerve ducked and Ospreay accidentally hit the referee. In the midst of the confusion, Swerve hit a poisonrana, but Ospreay landed on his feet and hit the Hidden Blade on Swerve. Don Callis then came out and attempted to hand Ospreay a screwdriver, but Ospreay hesitated. Prince Nana shoved Callis, which caused Ospreay to get furious and almost hit Nana with the screwdriver. Ospreay left Nana and immediately he entered back in the ring, Swerve hit a House Call and then a Swerve Stomp for a nearfall, as another referee had entered the ring to make the count. Swerve hit another House Call for another two-count. Ospreay attempted a weak Hidden Blade, but Swerve caught him and delivered the JML Driver. Swerve covered Ospreay for the three-count to retain his AEW World Championship.

== Reception ==
Mike Malkasian of Wrestling Headlines gave the overall show an 8.75/10, saying "A very solid PPV tonight, and we’ve come to expect that from AEW. While the match quality was a little lower than Double or Nothing, it was still strong, and we got a lot of storylines advancement, too. Go out of you way to see the main event and Dragon vs. Dragon, for sure. The Mariah May, Toni Storm, and Mina Shirakawa stuff is great. Britt Baker returns. Going to be a strong summer for AEW".

John Canton of TJR Wrestling.net gave the show a 7.75/10, saying "I thought Forbidden Door was a pretty good show overall, but I also gave it the lowest rating out of the four AEW PPVs so far this year. There were too many average or below average matches for my liking and it’s not normal for AEW PPVs to be like that. With that said, the Swerve Strickland/Will Ospreay match lived up to the hype and I enjoyed it a lot. The Forbidden Door concept isn’t as interesting as AEW thinks. There were several matches where the fans were quiet for the majority of the match or cared more about what a fan was wearing in the crowd. They did come alive for the main event at least so that’s good thing. It’s a long night for the fans with 15 matches taking place over five hours. The hardcore AEW fans that never see anything wrong with the company will say that stuff doesn’t matter, but the reality is it does matter".

Erik Beaston of Bleacher Report graded the show an A, notably saying "The AEW president routinely churns out quality PPV cards. After one night of exhilarating action, fans are quick to trumpet the next great era in the company, until Wednesday's Dynamite reminds everyone that the follow-up to those events is equally as important as the shows themselves. For now, Forbidden Door gets an easy thumbs up for a show that was rather excellent between the ropes".

Fred Morlan of Voices of Wrestling gave the overall show an 8/10, saying "Even though the main event broke the Forbidden Door mold in terms of not being AEW vs. someone outside of the company, it turned out to be the right call. There are still major concerns about this company. This crowd was cold for a lot of the night, which hurt several matches that were otherwise well worked. Still, all in all, this show delivered very high-quality in-ring action with lots of finishes that made sense and should set up future storylines. One can only hope that this is a step in AEW steering out of their creative doldrums of the past few months. Forbidden Door may not quite be what 2022 or 2023 were, but it’s a strong show easily worth your time and money".

Wrestling journalist Dave Meltzer of the Wrestling Observer Newsletter rated the following matches: Pre-show – Fletcher/Serpentico bout 1 star (lowest rated match on the entire card), four-way tag team match 3.25 stars, Willow & Tam/Statlander & Momo match 3.5 stars, Mariah vs. Saraya bout 2 stars and the trios match 4.25 stars; PPV – MJF/Hechicero match 3.25 stars, the Scissor Ace vs. Elite match 3.75 stars, Danielson vs. Takagi 4.75 stars, the Women's World Championship match 4 stars, the Sabre Jr./Cassidy battle 4.5 stars, Learning Tree & Jeff Cobb vs. Joe, Hook and Shibata 3.25 stars, the TNT Championship ladder match 4.5 stars, the Winner Takes All match 4 stars, the IWGP World Heavyweight Championship match 3 stars, and the main event 5.5 stars (the highest rated match on the card).

== Results ==
No.	Results	Stipulations	Times
1^{P}	Kyle Fletcher defeated Serpentico by pinfall	Singles match	3:10
2^{P}	Kings of the Black Throne (Malakai Black and Brody King) defeated Tomohiro Ishii and Kyle O'Reilly, Roderick Strong and Gabe Kidd (with Gedo, Matt Taven, and Mike Bennett), and Private Party (Zay and Quen) by pinfall	Four-way tag team match	8:40
3^{P}	Willow Nightingale and Tam Nakano defeated Kris Statlander and Momo Watanabe (with Stokely Hathaway) by pinfall	Tag team match	10:20
4^{P}	Mariah May (with "Timeless" Toni Storm and Luther) defeated Saraya (with Harley Cameron) by pinfall	Women's Owen Hart Cup Tournament first round match	8:35
5^{P}	Lucha Brothers (Penta El Zero Miedo and Rey Fénix) and Místico (with Alex Abrahantes) defeated Los Ingobernables de Japón (Yota Tsuji, Titan, and Hiromu Takahashi) by submission	Trios match	12:00
6	MJF defeated Hechicero by pinfall	Singles match	9:50
7	The Elite (Matthew Jackson, Nicholas Jackson, and Kazuchika Okada) defeated Scissor Ace (Anthony Bowens, Max Caster, and Hiroshi Tanahashi) by pinfall	Trios match	13:00
8	Bryan Danielson defeated Shingo Takagi by submission	Men's Owen Hart Cup Tournament First Round match	20:20
9	"Timeless" Toni Storm (c) (with Luther) defeated Mina Shirakawa by pinfall	Singles match for the AEW Women's World Championship; Mariah May was at ringside in support of both participants.	11:40
10	Zack Sabre Jr. defeated Orange Cassidy by submission	Singles match	16:20
11	Samoa Joe, Hook, and Katsuyori Shibata defeated The Learning Tree (Chris Jericho and Big Bill) and Jeff Cobb (with Bryan Keith) by pinfall	Trios match	14:00
12	Jack Perry defeated Konosuke Takeshita, Mark Briscoe, Dante Martin, Lio Rush, and El Phantasmo	Ladder match for the vacant AEW TNT Championship	16:55
13	Mercedes Moné (AEW) defeated Stephanie Vaquer (NJPW) by submission	Winner Takes All match for the AEW TBS Championship and NJPW Strong Women's Championship	16:50
14	Tetsuya Naito defeated Jon Moxley (c) by pinfall	Singles match for the IWGP World Heavyweight Championship	17:05
15	Swerve Strickland (c) (with Prince Nana) defeated Will Ospreay by pinfall	Singles match for the AEW World Championship	27:05
(c) / – the champion(s) heading into the match; P / – the match was broadcast on the pre-show

== See also ==
- 2024 in professional wrestling
- List of All Elite Wrestling pay-per-view events
- List of major NJPW events
