= Pervaiz Rashid =

Pakistani politician (born 1950)

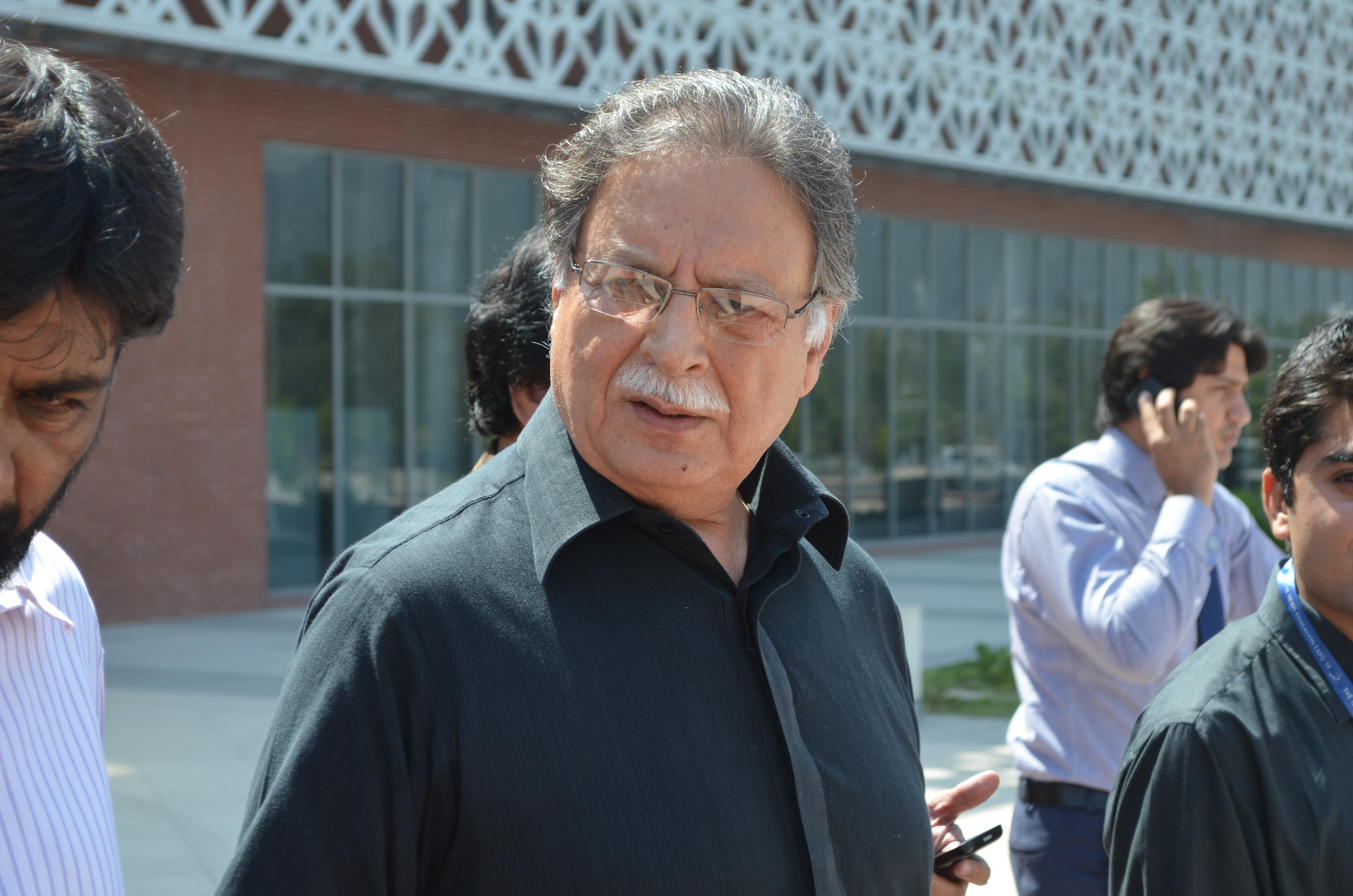

Minister for Information, Broadcasting and National Heritage
- In office 7 June 2013 – 29 October 2016
- President: Mamnoon Hussain
- Prime Minister: Nawaz Sharif
- Preceded by: Qamar Zaman Kaira
- Succeeded by: Marriyum Aurangzeb, Minister of State

Minister for Minister for Law and Justice
- In office 27 November 2013 – March 2016
- Prime Minister: Nawaz Sharif
- Succeeded by: Zahid Hamid

Chairman of the Pakistan Television Corporation
- In office 27 February 1997 – 12 October 1999
- Preceded by: Shahid Nadeem
- Succeeded by: Major-General Rashid Qureshi, ISPR

Member of the Senate of Pakistan
- Incumbent
- Assumed office 2009

Personal details
- Party: PMLN (1997–present)
- Education: Gordon College (BA)

Pervaiz Rashid (Urdu: پرويز رشيد) is a Pakistani politician who served as the Federal Minister of Information, Broadcasting, and National Heritage and Minister for Law, Justice and Human Rights in the Third Sharif ministry. A member of Pakistan Muslim League (Nawaz), Rashid has been a member of the Senate of Pakistan since 2009 and previously served as the Chairman of the Pakistan Television Corporation from 1997 to 1999 during the Sharif's government in 1997.

Considered a representative of the left wing of the PML-N, he has previously described himself as a Marxist and as an admirer of Che Guevara and Meraj Muhammad Khan.

== Early life and education ==
Rashid belongs to a Pashtun-Kakazai family. He studied at the Government Gordon College, Rawalpindi where alongside fellow politician Sheikh Rasheed Ahmad he was a member of the debating club.

== Political career ==
=== Pakistan People's Party ===
Rashid started his political career as a student leader from Pakistan Peoples Party student wing, PSF, from Gordon College Rawalpindi.

When Zulfikar Ali Bhutto imposed martial law in 1970, as he refused to hand power to Sheikh Mujibur Rahman, Rashid, despite being a PPP supporter, protested and was eventually put in jail. He would later become one of the founders of PPP Rawalpindi, mainly to counter the rise of Sheikh Rasheed Ahmad, his once college mate. Later he'd be appointed the personal secretary to the chief minister of Khyber Pakhtunkhwa, and while he was mostly inactive in politics during the rule of General Zia-ul-Haq, he'd re-emerge in the mid-1990s as a close aide of Shehbaz Sharif, being recommended by Nazir Naji.

=== Pakistan Muslim League (N) ===
Later he joined PML-N and was elected member of the Senate in 1997 on PML-N party ticket. He was made Chairman Pakistan Television Corporation in 1997. He was arrested by the army after the 1999 Musharraf takeover and jailed.

He was sworn in as Federal Minister for Information and Broadcasting in June 2013. In November 2013, he was given the additional charge of Minister of Law, Justice and Human Rights.

He was re-elected to the Senate of Pakistan as a candidate of PML (N) in the 2015 Pakistani Senate election.

He was made to resign in October 2016 from his position as Minister for Information, Broadcasting and National Heritage following the report which alleged his involvement in leaking contents of a high-profile security meeting.

Political offices
Preceded by Shahid Nadeem	Chairman of the Pakistan Television Corporation; 1997–1999	Succeeded by Rashid Qureshi
Preceded by Qamar Zaman Kaira	Minister for Information, Broadcasting and National Heritage; 2013–2016	Succeeded by Maryam Aurangzeb; Minister of State
