= Kaiser Rafiq =

Pakistani entrepreneur and media executive

- Born: Mian Channu, Punjab, Pakistan
- Occupation: Media entrepreneur
- Organizations: Discover Pakistan TV
- Known for: Founder and CEO of Discover Pakistan TV
- Title: Chief Executive Officer

Kaiser Rafiq (Urdu: قیصر رفیق) is a Pakistani media entrepreneur and the founder / chief executive officer Discover Pakistan TV, a Lahore-based satellite channel focused on tourism and infotainment programming. The channel launched in March 2021.

== Career ==
On 21 March 2021 Kaiser Rafiq founded Discover Pakistan TV Pakistan's first tourism TV channel.

In June 2023, Rafiq launched an AI-powered talk show on Discover Pakistan TV, described in media coverage as the first of its kind in Pakistan, in which he appeared through a lifelike AI-generated avatar serving as the host with four other AI generated guests. Rafiq followed this with the launch of what he described as the fully AI-powered English news channel in August 2025.

In December 2025, Rafiq, as CEO of Discover Pakistan, organized the 2nd National Tourism Awards. At the event, Federal Minister for Information and Broadcasting Attaullah Tarar credited Rafiq’s initiatives with helping to dispel international misconceptions and presenting the country's "true story" to a global audience.

In 2011, Rafiq, while serving as Managing Director of the Royal Emirates Group, announced the group’s agreement to acquire Spanish La Liga club Getafe CF. The reported value of the deal ranged between €70 million and €90 million, and it was covered by international media outlets including Sky Sports, Reuters, the BBC, and The Guardian. Reports the following year indicated that the agreement had expired.

== Other ventures ==
He has been elected as a board director for Pakistan Broadcasters Association. He is also member of accreditation committee of PBA.

== See also ==
- Discover Pakistan TV
- Pakistan Broadcasters Association
