= The News International =

English-language newspaper in Pakistan

- Type: Daily newspaper
- Format: Broadsheet
- Owner: Jang Media Group
- Founder: Mir Shakil-ur-Rahman
- Publisher: Mir Shakil-ur-Rahman
- Founded: February 11, 1991; 35 years ago
- Language: English
- Headquarters: Karachi, Pakistan
- City: Karachi; Lahore; Rawalpindi
- Circulation: 140,000
- ISSN: 1563-9479
- Website: thenews.com.pk

The News International, published in broadsheet size, is one of the largest English-language newspapers in Pakistan.

It is published daily from Karachi, Lahore and Rawalpindi/Islamabad.

An overseas edition is published from London that caters to the Pakistani community in the United Kingdom.

== Publication ==
The News International was launched in 1991.

The News International and its Sunday version The News on Sunday is published by the Jang Group of Newspapers, publisher of the Daily Jang (جنگ), an Urdu language newspaper in Pakistan. Mir Khalil-ur-Rehman was the founder of the newspaper and his younger son, Mir Shakil-ur-Rahman, is the current chief executive officer and editor-in-chief.

The financial section of The News International contains stories taken from the British daily Financial Times. The weekend edition of The News International also contains a two-page magazine in the Chinese language that is produced and published by a Chinese company based in Islamabad.

== See also ==
- List of newspapers in Pakistan
