= Karachi American School =

Location
- Amir Khusro Road, KDA Scheme # 1 Karachi 75350 (Pakistan); Pakistan
- Coordinates: 24°53′05″N 67°05′13″E

Information
- Type: Private
- Motto: What we are to be, we are now becoming
- Established: 1952
- Grades: Preschool - Grade 13
- Website: www.kas.edu.pk

The Karachi American School (KAS) (Urdu: کراچی امریکن اسکول), formerly known as Karachi American Society School, is a preschool to Grade 12 day school located in Karachi, Sindh, Pakistan.

== History ==
The school was founded in 1952 as Karachi American Society School with funding from the U.S. Government.

Formerly, it was known as the International School of Karachi. It is considered an elite school of Karachi.

In August 2017, the school expanded its offerings and founded a college called Karachi American College.

== Alumni ==
- Yasin Anwar
- Fatima Bhutto
- Fauzia Kasuri
- Mir Ibrahim Rahman
- Tina Sani

== See also ==
- Americans in Pakistan
