= Mariah May =

English professional wrestler (born 1998)

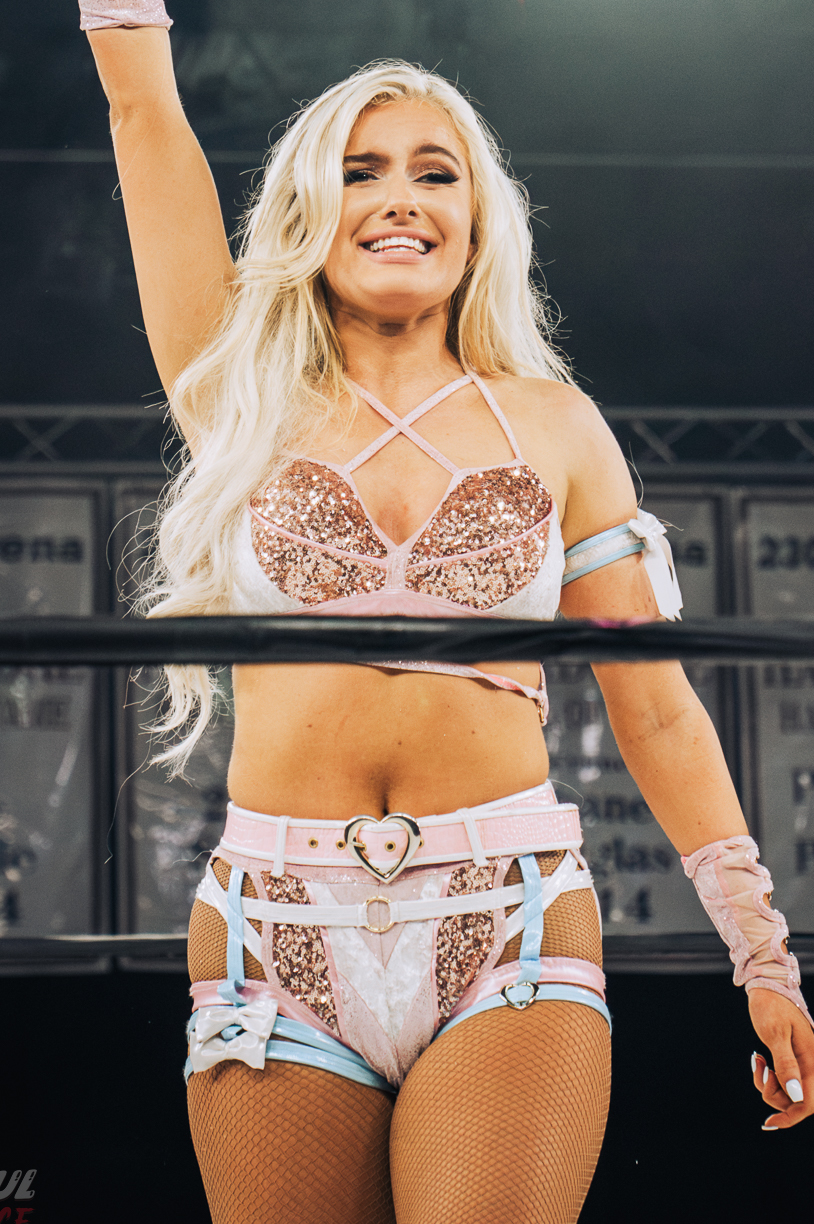
- May in 2024

Personal information
- Born: Mariah May Mead; 4 August 1998 (age 28) London, England

Professional wrestling career
- Ring name(s): Blake Monroe; Mariah Eagan; Mariah May
- Billed height: 5 ft 8 in (173 cm)
- Billed weight: 136 lb (62 kg)
- Billed from: London, England
- Trained by: CACC Snake Pit Japan; Knucklelocks; Shigeo Miyato
- Debut: 2 February 2019

Mariah May Mead (born 4 August 1998) is an English professional wrestler. As of June 2025, she is signed to WWE, where she performs on the SmackDown brand under the ring name Blake Monroe. She is a former one-time NXT Women's North American Champion. She is also known for her tenure in All Elite Wrestling (AEW), where she performed under her real name, stylized as Mariah May.

Mead first started as a professional wrestling ring announcer in 2018 before debuting as a wrestler in 2019, after which she performed for independent promotions such as Revolution Pro Wrestling. She moved to Japan to make her World Wonder Ring Stardom debut in 2022 and became a Goddesses of Stardom Champion with her Club Venus teammate Mina Shirakawa. She then joined the American promotion All Elite Wrestling (AEW) from 2023 to 2025, where she was a one-time AEW Women's World Champion. After departing from AEW, she signed and made her debut with WWE in June 2025.

== Early life ==
Mariah May Mead was born in London on 4 August 1998, and grew up in Islington.

== Professional wrestling career ==
=== Early career (2018–2022) ===
Before becoming a professional wrestler, Mead began her career as a ring announcer and performed on multiple shows over the course of 2018. On 2 February 2019, she made her in-ring debut under the ring name Mariah May, facing WWE NXT UK wrestler Nina Samuels in a losing effort. As a last-minute replacement, May appeared at Progress Wrestling's Chapter 89 show on 26 May 2019 in her first appearance with the promotion. The show, styled with a 1980s theme, saw her only appearance as a fitness instructor character called Mariah Eagan.

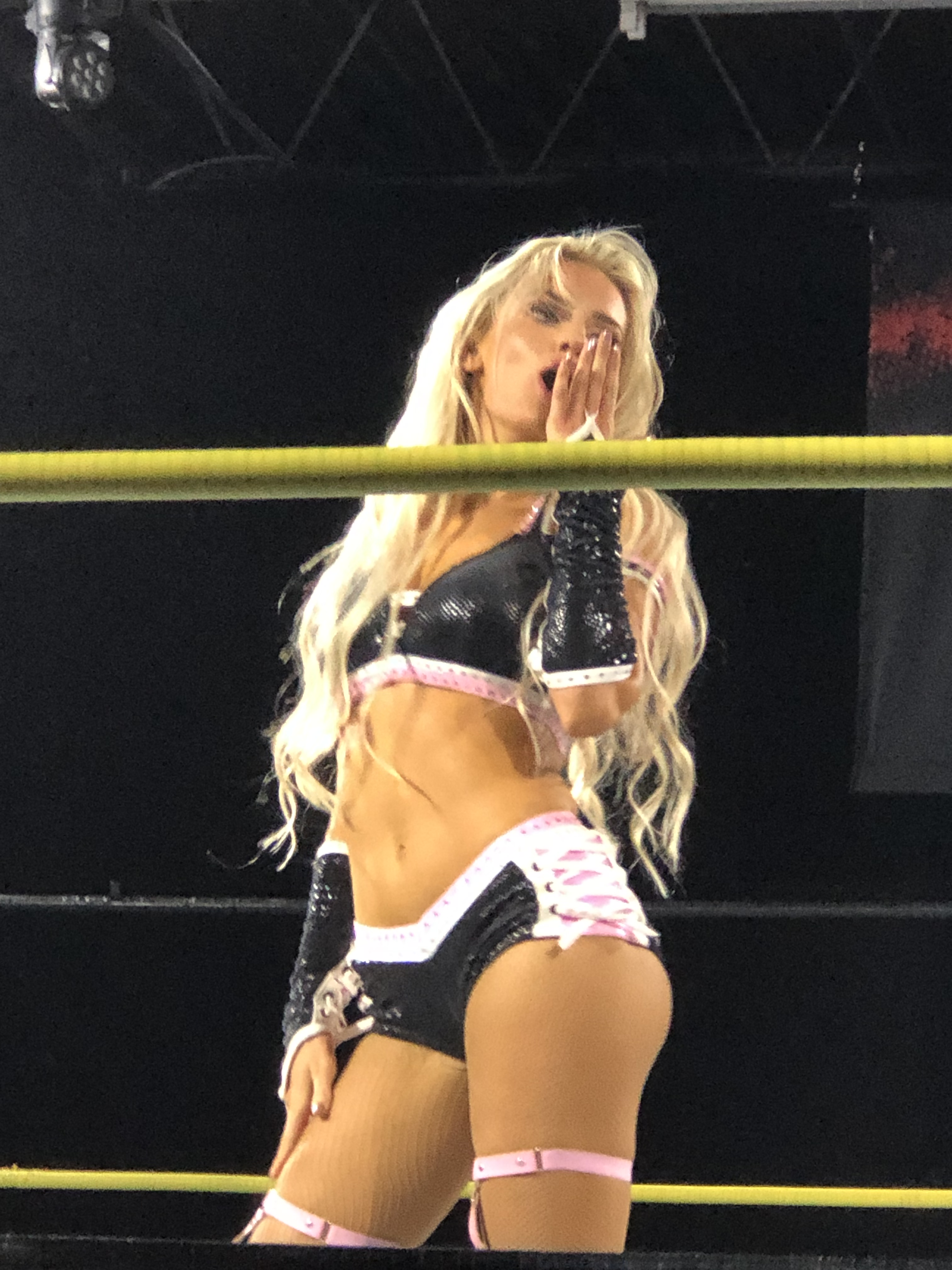
May making her Combat Zone Wrestling debut in March 2022

In June 2019, May participated in an unsuccessful three-day WWE tryout at the new UK WWE Performance Center in Enfield, where she received coaching from William Regal and Sarah Stock, among others. On 29 February 2020, she competed against five opponents in the main event of United Wrestling UK's I Can Do This All Day event, winning the United Wrestling Championship to earn her first professional wrestling championship.

After COVID-19 lockdowns, May returned to wrestling on 26 June 2021. She formed a tag team with fellow independent wrestler Zoe Lucas known as the Dream Dollz. The team had their first match together at TNT Extreme Wrestling. This partnership grew deeper at Revolution Pro Wrestling's (RevPro) "Live from the Cockpit 51" event; after Gisele Shaw defeated Lucas to reclaim the vacated RevPro Undisputed Women's Championship, May took to the ring, where she ambushed the new champion during a post-match interview, cementing her arrival on 4 July 2021. A rivalry quickly formed as May challenged Shaw for her newly won title on 18 July 2021. This feud continued into the promotion's Queen of the Ring tournament held later that month. May, along with Shaun Jackson and Kenneth Halfpenny, assisted Lucas in defeating Shaw to win the crown and the right to call herself Revolution Pro Wrestling's Queen of the Ring. Shortly after, May began calling herself the "Princess of Revolution Pro Wrestling" and found herself up against the duo of Shaw and Hyan throughout the summer. These bouts culminated in May once again challenging Shaw for the championship on 21 August 2021 at RevPro's 9-Year Anniversary Show in Manchester.

During the remainder of 2021, May continued to find success across multiple independent promotions, where she successfully defended her first championship and went on to win two more. In 2022, she found success at RevPro, picking up victories in singles matches against Chantal Jordan and Laura Di Matteo. At Ultimate Pro Wrestling's 7-Year Anniversary Show on 30 January, May interfered in the main event, deciding its outcome and being awarded her forth simultaneous championship with the Big League Wrestling Women's Championship.

The following month, May began her first tour in the United States, starting with a meet-and-greet at New Jersey's Garden State Trading Card Show alongside wrestlers AJ Lee, Kaitlyn, Barbi Hayden, Gisele Shaw, Harley Cameron, and more. She made her American in-ring debut on 26 March 2022 at Battleground Championship Wrestling's When Worlds Collide event, defeating Lady Frost at Philadelphia's 2300 Arena. The next night, she appeared on Combat Zone Wrestling's All Night Long show, where she competed again before travelling to Dallas, Texas. Over the next three days, she made consecutive appearances at WrestleCon while wrestling at both Texas Style Wrestling on 1 April 2022 and New Texas Pro Wrestling's Cowboys from Hell event, challenging for the latter's Women's Championship against Raychell Rose on 2 April.

Upon returning to the UK, May travelled across Europe over the following months and wrestled for promotions in Germany during April and Italy during May. On 9 August 2022, May and Cameron formed a tag team called Siren's Fury, though they never end up wrestling a match together. In what was hailed a "Dreamhouse Deathmatch", May faced off against Harley Hudson at Sovereign Pro Wrestling's premiere event First Reign on 1 October 2022, with the stipulation being that anything pink colored could be used as a weapon. Following this match, May travelled to Pakistan for a week-long media tour promoting Ring of Pakistan and visiting survivors of the 2022 Pakistan floods.

=== World Wonder Ring Stardom (2022–2024) ===
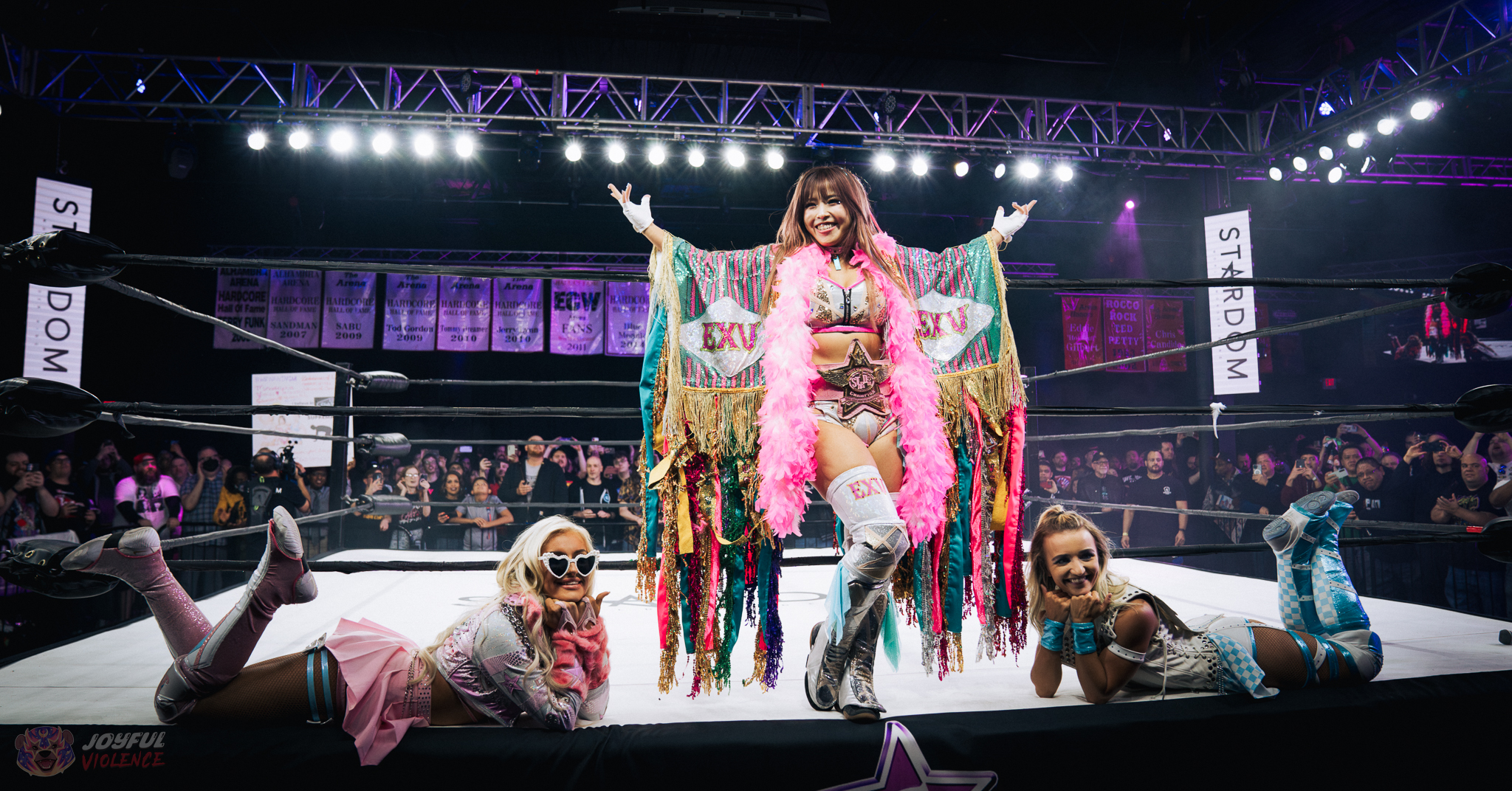
May (left) with Club Venus members Mina Shirakawa and Xia Brookside at Stardom American Dream 2024

At World Wonder Ring Stardom's event Dream Queendom 2, May made her Japanese debut by accompanying Mina Shirakawa to the ring alongside a returning Xia Brookside. Shirakawa and Unagi Sayaka represented the Cosmic Angels to defeat Donna Del Mondo members Mai Sakurai and Thekla in a tag team match. Following the match, a victorious Shirakawa verbally and physically confronted Sayaka and announced the formation of Club Venus, a trio featuring herself, May, and Brookside.

May officially became the newest member of Club Venus in a match against Super Strong Stardom Big Machine at New Blood Premium, with Shirakawa in her corner, where May began using a masked alter ego by the name of Sexy Dynamite Princess and came out on top in singles competition. The following night on 26 March, May entered the Cinderella Tournament 2023, picking up a win against Rina. Her time in the tournament ultimately came to an end in the second round following an over-the-tope-rope elimination from Mai Sakurai. In addition to competing at All Star Grand Queendom, as a last-minute addition to the English-language broadcast of the event, May joined the commentary team for the duration of the show.

Following May and Shirakawa's victory over Ami Sohrei and Mirai at Korakuen Hall, the two Club Venus members issued a challenge to The New Eras for the Goddesses of Stardom Championship. Uniting as a Club Venus sub-group called Rose Gold, May and Shirakawa received their championship match at Sunshine 2023 and picked up a victory to become the 28th Goddesses of Stardom Champions, which also marked May's first Stardom championship. Outlasting 18 other opponents in a last chance Rumble match, alongside Hanan, May qualified to participate in the 5 Star Grand Prix 2023, where she competed as part of the Blue Stars block. On 30 September, she faced her fellow last chance Rumble winner Hanan in her final match of the tournament, which also served as May's farewell match from Stardom.

On 4 April 2024, May temporarily returned to Stardom at Stardom American Dream 2024, teaming with Club Venus members Shirakawa and Brookside in a losing effort against Mayu Iwatani, Momo Kohgo, and Tam Nakano.

=== All Elite Wrestling (2023–2025) ===
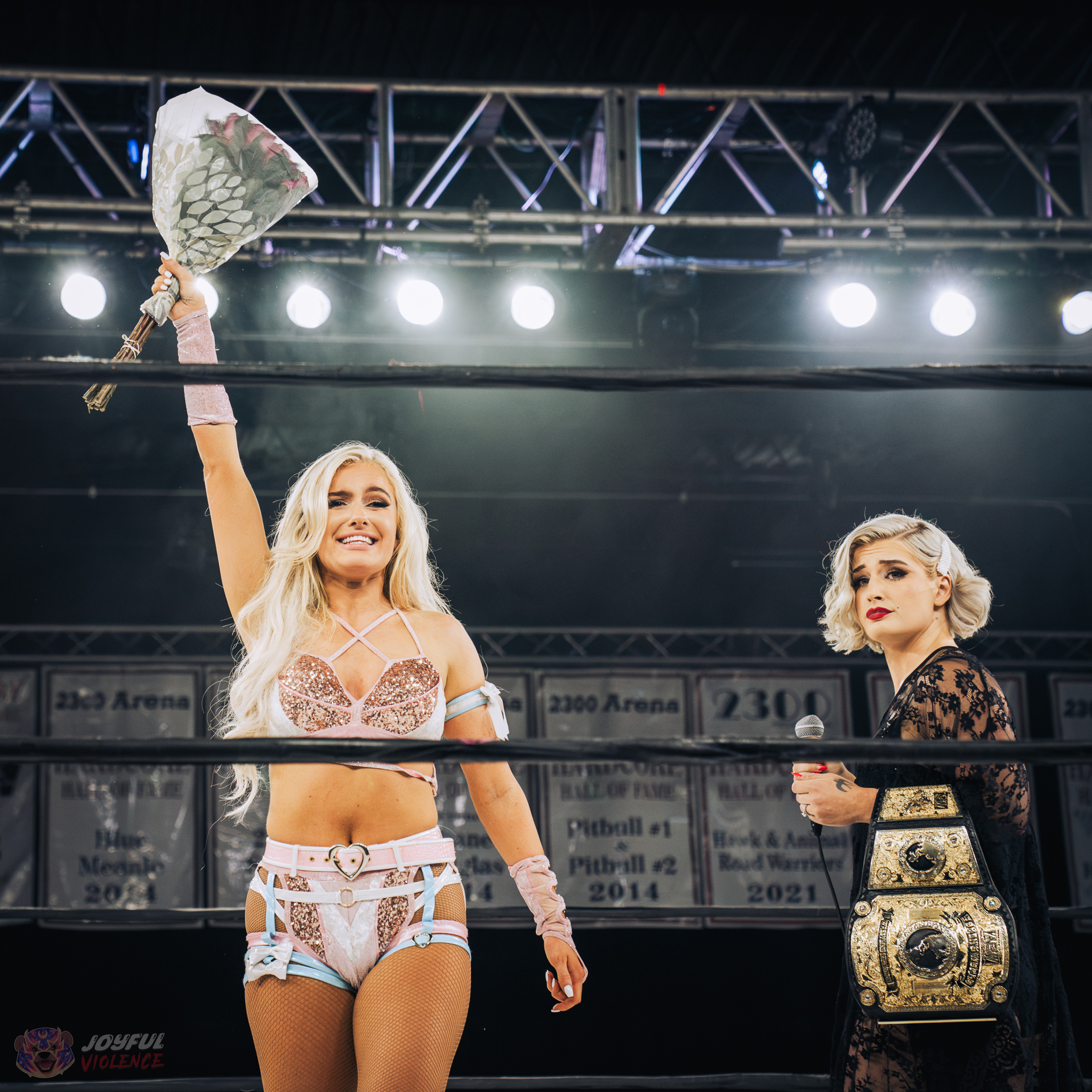
May was introduced to AEW in November 2023 as an obsessed fan of "Timeless" Toni Storm (right), later becoming her "understudy" and playing "the part" of Storm's previous persona until betraying Storm in July 2024

On 8 November 2023 edition of Dynamite, May was announced as the newest signing to All Elite Wrestling (AEW). May was introduced in a segment by RJ City as a superfan of AEW Women's World Champion "Timeless" Toni Storm, establishing her as a heel. In the following months, Storm adopted May as an "understudy" and protégé. On 3 January 2024 episode of Dynamite, May made her AEW in-ring debut, defeating Queen Aminata. After the match, May was confronted by the debuting Deonna Purrazzo. At Revolution, May adopted Storm's previous "Rockstar" persona, including wearing Storm's old ring attire and entrance music, and wrestling matches on Dynamite and Collision in this persona as a tribute to Storm, who was her mentor. At Supercard of Honor: Zero Hour, May made her Ring of Honor (ROH) debut, defeating Momo Kohgo. On 11 April episode of Dynamite, May defeated Anna Jay. Afterwards, she was saved by her former Stardom tag partner Mina Shirakawa, who shared a kiss and champagne, teasing a romantic storyline between the two. In the weeks leading up to Forbidden Door, May was the centre of a love triangle storyline, which saw her torn between supporting Storm and Shirakawa, who was Storm's title challenger at the event. May ultimately remained neutral as the two competed for her affection. After Storm defeated Shirakawa at Forbidden Door on 30 June, May resolved the conflict with a three-way kiss.

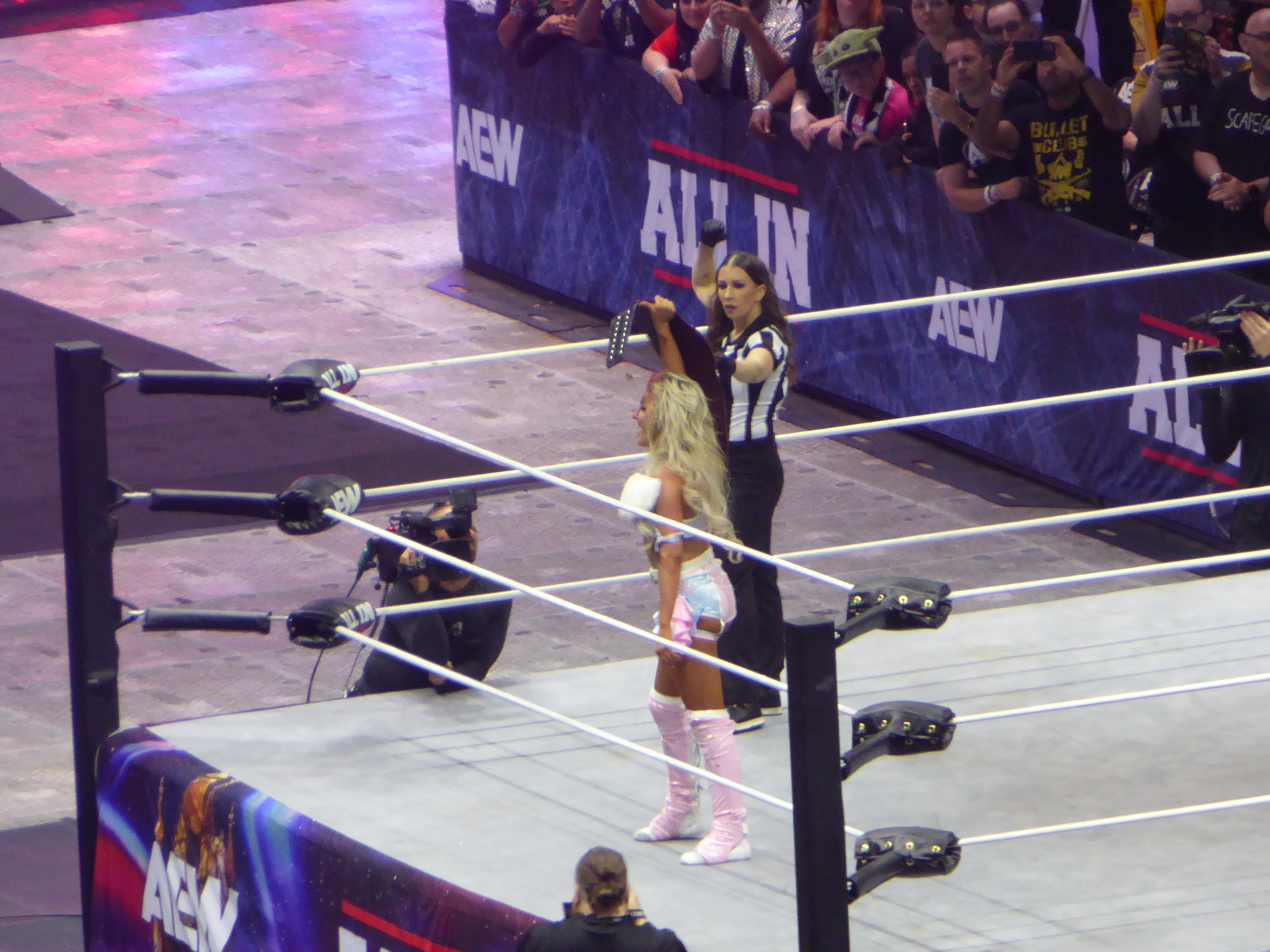
May after winning the AEW Women's World Championship at All In in August 2024.

In June 2024, May participated in the Owen Hart Foundation Tournament and subsequently defeated Willow Nightingale to win the tournament on 10 July episode of Dynamite. With the victory, she also earned an AEW Women's World Championship match against Storm at All In. Immediately after winning the tournament final, May turned on Storm and viciously attacked her and Storm's on-screen butler Luther, re-establishing herself as a heel and dubbing herself "The Glamour" Mariah May. At All In on 25 August, May defeated Storm to win the AEW Women's World Championship for the first time. On 4 September episode of Dynamite, May successfully defended her title in her first title defence against Nyla Rose. Ever since winning the title, May yearned for Mina Shirakawa to return and celebrate her title win together. On 16 November episode of Collision, after successfully defending her title against Anna Jay, May reunited with Shirakawa once again. At Full Gear on 23 November, May held her title win celebration with Shirakawa, where May turned on Shirakawa. At Dynamite: Winter is Coming on 11 December, May successfully retained her title against Shirakawa. After the match, May was interrupted by Storm, who returned after a near four-month hiatus in AEW after losing the AEW Women's World Championship to May, and acted as if she had just joined AEW as a rookie in her "Rockstar" persona. At Dynamite: Maximum Carnage on 15 January 2025, Storm won a Casino Gauntlet match to earn a title shot against May. At Collision: Homecoming on 25 January, during a face-to-face with May, Storm revealed that her act was all a ruse and that she had been "Timeless" the entire time. At Grand Slam Australia on 15 February, May lost the AEW Women's World Championship to Storm, ending her reign at 174 days. At Revolution on 9 March, May failed to defeat Storm in a rematch for the title billed as a "Hollywood Ending" Falls Count Anywhere match to end their feud in what was her final match in the promotion. May departed AEW in May 2025.

=== WWE (2025–present) ===
==== NXT (2025–2026) ====
Mead made her surprise WWE debut for the NXT brand on 3 June 2025 episode of NXT as a face, where she confronted NXT Women's Champion Jacy Jayne and subsequently adopted the ring name Blake Monroe. Monroe made her televised in-ring debut at NXT The Great American Bash on 12 July in a tag team match, where she teamed with Jordynne Grace to defeat Fatal Influence (Jayne and Fallon Henley). The following night at Evolution, Monroe accompanied Grace in the latter's NXT Women's Championship match against Jayne, where Monroe attacked Grace with the title belt, turning heel in the process. The pair traded victories, with Monroe defeating Grace at NXT Heatwave on 24 August whereas Grace defeated Monroe in a Weaponized Steel Cage match at NXT No Mercy on 27 September to end their feud. Immediately after, Monroe set her sights on the NXT Women's North American Championship held by Sol Ruca. At NXT Halloween Havoc on 25 October, Monroe defeated Zaria, who wrestled on behalf of an injured Ruca, to win the title, her first championship in WWE. In her first title defence at Night 1 of NXT: Gold Rush on 18 November, Monroe defeated Ruca by technical knockout after Zaria threw in the towel on Ruca's behalf. On 16 December episode of NXT, during a match against Thea Hail, they botched a pinfall and Monroe lost the title in an unplanned title change, ending her reign at 52 days.

On 17 March 2026 episode of NXT, Monroe then began a feud with Tatum Paxley and stole the title from her after retaining against Izzi Dame in a Steel Cage match. At NXT Stand & Deliver on 4 April, Monroe failed to win the title from Paxley. On the following episode of NXT on 7 April, Monroe declared herself champion after The Vanity Project gifted her a custom belt despite losing to Paxley at Stand and Deliver. That same night, Monroe and Jackson Drake defeated Paxley and Shiloh Hill in a mixed tag team match following interference from Brad Baylor and Ricky Smokes with Monroe pinning Paxley. On NXT: Revenge Night 2 on 14 April, Monroe once again failed to win the title from Paxley in a Casket match in what would be her final match in NXT.

==== SmackDown (2026–present) ====
On 24 April 2026 episode of SmackDown, a vignette aired teasing Monroe's arrival to the SmackDown brand, making her debut on 27 June, edition of SmackDown in her hometown in London. She made her main roster in-ring debut on the 2 October of SmackDown, where she defeated Giulia.

== Professional wrestling persona ==
Mead's original ring name, Mariah May, is a tribute to her grandmother, who gave Mead's middle name and died before Mead started professional wrestling. After her tenure in AEW, she revealed that she regretted using her real name as her ring name and was pleased that she could start anew. Her current ring name, Blake Monroe, is a tribute to her niece whereas "Monroe" was the first ever ring name Mead came up with. She uses "The Glamour" and "The Woman from Hell" as her wrestling moniker.

== Other media ==
Mead has modelled for WWE Shop and British fashion brands such as Misspap and Miss Bardot.

On 16 January 2017, Mead launched a YouTube channel featuring a look into her life and passion for wrestling, fashion, gaming, and fitness. On 14 June 2020, she launched a Twitch channel on which she streamed, chatted, and played games with her fans, whom she referred to collectively as House May.

In 2022, Mead modelled for Freddy by Livify Clothing and at Calgary's Cowboys Music Festival. She also starred as Roxy in the ITV2 wrestling comedy miniseries Deep Heat and had a small role in the short horror comedy film Granny DJ.

== Personal life ==
Mead is a supporter of Arsenal F.C.

== Filmography ==
=== Film and television ===
Year	Title	Role	Notes
2015	Criminal Activities	Schoolgirl 2	
2022	Deep Heat	Roxy	3 episodes
2022	Granny DJ	First Smiler	Short film
2024	Hey! (EW)	Herself	2 episodes

=== Video Games ===
Year	Title	Notes
2026	WWE 2K26	debut WWE 2K game appearance

=== Podcasts ===
Year	Title	Role	Notes
2024	Ring the Belle	Herself	1 episode
2023–2025	AEW Unrestricted	Herself	2 episodes

== Championships and accomplishments ==
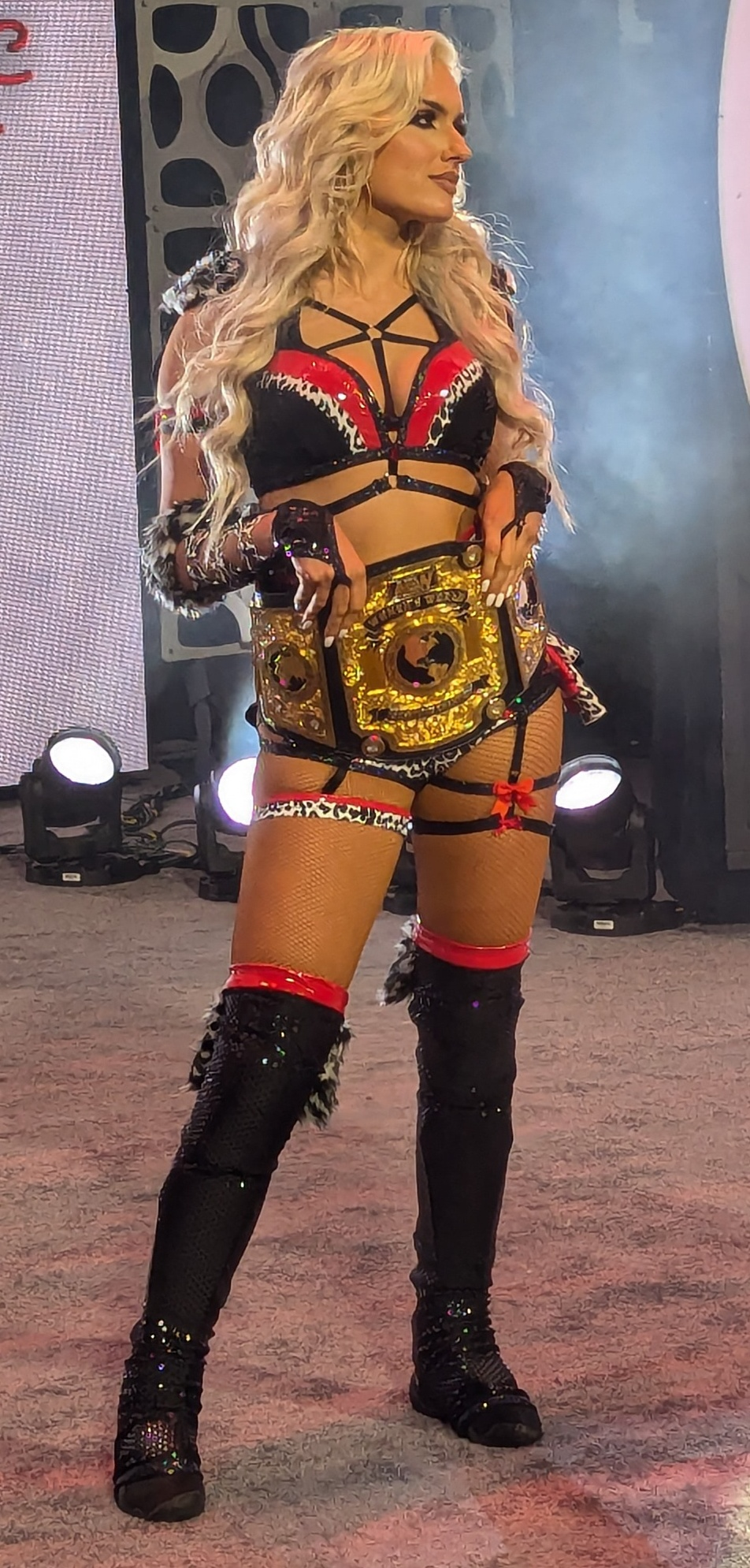
May is a former one-time AEW Women's World Champion...

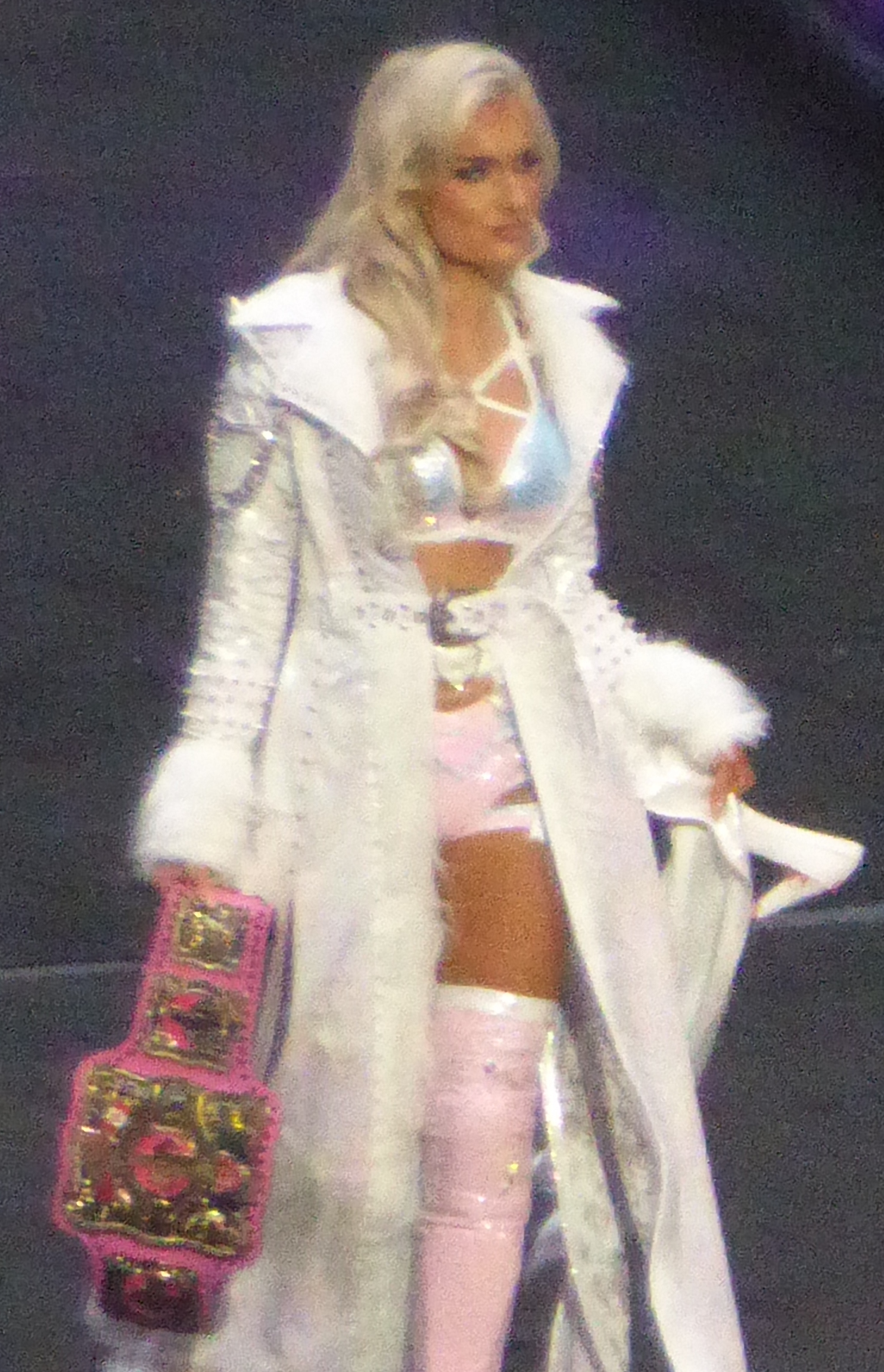
...and is the 2024 Women's Owen Hart Cup winner.

- All Elite Wrestling
  - AEW Women's World Championship (1 time)
  - Women's Owen Hart Cup (2024)
- ESPN
  - Ranked No. 5 of the 30 Best Pro Wrestlers Under 30 in 2024
  - Best Storyline (2025) (with Toni Storm)
- Pro Wrestling Illustrated
  - Ranked No. 9 of the top 250 female singles wrestlers in the PWI Women's 250 in 2024
- Slammasters Wrestling
  - Slammasters Women's Championship (1 time, inaugural)
- United Wrestling UK
  - United Wrestling Championship (1 time, inaugural)
- World Wonder Ring Stardom
  - Goddesses of Stardom Championship (1 time) – with Mina Shirakawa
- WWE
  - NXT Women's North American Championship (1 time)
