= Geo Super =

Sports Channel

Geo Super HD
- Country: Pakistan
- Network: Geo TV
- Headquarters: Karachi, Sindh, Pakistan

Programming
- Language: Urdu
- Picture format: 1080p (16:9, HDTV) MPEG-4

Ownership
- Owner: Jang Media Group (Mir Shakil-ur-Rahman); Mir Ibrahim Rahman
- Sister channels: Geo News; Geo Entertainment; Geo Kahani; Geo Tez

History
- Launched: September 2006; 19 years ago

Links
- Website: geosuper.tv

Availability

Streaming media
- Live streaming: Geo Super LIVE

Geo Super HD is the first 24-hour Karachi-based Pakistani Television channel dedicated to the world of Sports. It is owned by the Jang Media Group. Geo Super was launched in September 2006. It has broadcasting rights for many sporting events such as Badminton, Cricket, Football, Hockey, and others.

== Launch ==
In late September 2006, Geo Television Network launched Geo Super. Geo Super broadcasts sports events, focusing mainly on cricket, with secondary focuses on football and field hockey. Shortly after its launch, Geo Super managed to secure the television rights of the ICC tournaments for the next five years covering all major cricketing events like ICC Cricket World Cup, ICC Champions Trophy, Twenty20 World Cup, Faysal Bank T20 Cup and ICC Under-19 Cricket World Cup.

== Subscription ==
Geo Super is an encrypted channel and is only available in Pakistan (legally) free for cable operators. The whole Geo Network uses Conax encryption with KAON set-top boxes.

== Coverage ==
Currently, Geo Super has broadcasting rights for Cricket, Football, And Tennis. In Cricket Geo Super has rights for Afghanistan Cricket till 2023. It also has cricket leagues rights including Emirates D10 until 2021. Kashmir Premier League, Legends League Cricket until 2022 Mzansi Super League and Oman D10 until 2022. In Football Geo Super Has Rights For La Liga Until 2022. In Tennis Geo Super Has Rights For World TeamTennis Until 2021.

Geo Super has acquired the television broadcast rights for the ICC Men's T20 World Cup 2026 in Pakistan in a partnership with PTV and digital platform Myco.

Geo Super bagged the television media rights for the 2026 Pakistan Super League in Pakistan.

=== Country Cricket ===
Country	Host	Period
1) International Cricket In Afghanistan:-	United Arab Emirates Qatar	2022–present
2) International Cricket In Oman:-	Oman	2022–present

=== Country Professional Cricket Leagues ===
Leagues	Host
Major League Cricket (2025-present) 2025 Major League Cricket season	United States
Bangladesh Premier League:- (2023-present): 2025–26 Bangladesh Premier League; 2023–24 Bangladesh Premier League	Bangladesh
International League T20:- (2023-present): 2025 International League T20	United Arab Emirates

=== Country Professional Football Leagues ===
Leagues	Country	Seasons

=== Country Professional Tennis Leagues ===
Leagues	Country	Seasons

== Featured programmes ==
=== Score ===
Score is the most popular show of Geo Super which is hosted by Yahya Hussaini. Sometimes, Sikandar Bakht and Shoaib Akhtar accompany him in the show. The show also got famous become the Yahya Hussaini curse. The curse was that which ever cricketer Yahya Hussaini took a photo with, he or his team played really bad in the upcoming matches. The show mainly covers cricket news but sometimes also covers other sports.

=== Sports Lounge ===
Sports Lounge is the second most popular show of Geo Super. It is hosted by Haider Azhar.

== See also ==
- Geo Television Network
- Jang Group of Newspapers
