= Discover Pakistan TV =

- Country: Pakistan
- Broadcast area: Pakistan
- Headquarters: Lahore, Punjab, Pakistan

Programming
- Language: Urdu
- Picture format: 16:9 (1080i, HDTV)

Ownership
- Owner: Kaiser Rafiq

History
- Launched: 21 March 2021; 5 years ago

Links
- Website: www.discoverpakistan.tv

Discover Pakistan TV (Urdu: ڈسکور پاکستان) is a Pakistani television channel based in Lahore, Pakistan. It was launched on 21 March 2021 and is owned by Options International SMC. It is licensed by the Pakistan Electronic Media Regulatory Authority.

Discover Pakistan TV channel broadcasts documentaries, infotainment programs, coverage of tourism events, and development within Pakistan.

On September 27, 2024, Discover Pakistan TV started National Tourism Award.

== See also ==
- List of television stations in Pakistan
- List of news channels in Pakistan
