= Mir Shakil-ur-Rahman =

Pakistani businessman

Mir Shakil ur Rahman
- Born: 8 January 1957 (age 69); Karachi, Sindh, Pakistan
- Other name: MSR
- Education: St. Patrick's High School, Karachi
- Occupations: Journalist, Business Executive
- Known for: Chief Editor of Jang Group of Newspapers; Founder of Geo Entertainment; Geo News; Geo Super; AAG TV; Geo Tez; Geo Kahani; Geo Entertainment
- Spouses: Shahina Shakil (m. 1975) Erum Shakil (m. 1991)
- Children: 9 (including Mir Ibrahim Rahman)
- Relatives: Mir Khalil ur Rahman (father), Mehmooda Khalil ur Rahman (mother), Mir Javed ur Rahman (brother)
- Website: geo.tv

Mir Shakil ur Rahman (born 8 January 1957), also known as MSR, is a Pakistani media mogul and businessman. He is the founder of the 24-hour news cycle network, Geo TV.

In addition, he is also the owner of the Jang Group of Newspapers and the News International, which was founded by his father, the late Mir Khalil ur Rahman and part owner of the Independent Media Corporation. This media group publishes a number of newspapers and magazines in Urdu and English. IMC also owns the Geo TV network.

== Early life and education ==
Mir Shakil ur Rahman was born on 8 January 1957 in Karachi, to father Mir Khalil ur Rahman and mother Mehmooda Khalil ur Rahman. He is of Kashmiri descent, as his paternal grandparents had immigrated from Kashmir Valley. He grew up with six siblings; an older brother, four older sisters and a younger sister. His father was the founder of the Jang Group of Newspapers. Mir attended St Patrick's High School in Karachi and is listed among the famous personalities of Pakistan that were educated there.

== Career ==
In the late 1990s, during Nawaz Sharif's second term as prime minister, Shakil was first asked by Sharif's government to dismiss some of the staff members of the Jang Group. Keeping in line with the tradition of the media group that was founded by Mir Shakil's father, Mir Khalil ur Rehman, Shakil refused to dismiss the staff, a number of tax evasion cases were filed against his news group amounting to 40 million US dollars, followed by freezing of bank accounts and seizure of their assets. The government withdrew their court cases after some facts were made public by Shakil. Shakil established a television channel network by the name of Geo TV in May 2002. He was arrested by the NAB on 12 March 2020 on the allegations of getting 52 kanal land in Lahore by that time Chief Minister of Punjab Nawaz Sharif.

== Media industry associations ==
Mir Shakil has also served as the president of the All Pakistan Newspapers Society, in 2006. He remained a convener of the 'Wage Board Committee' of the society in 2010. He was the president of the Council of Pakistan Newspaper Editors in 1995–96 and again in 2003–04 and also the president of Pakistan Broadcasters Association (PBA) in 2005. Shakil served as a member of the Press Council of Pakistan in 2013. He owns multiple media outlets such as Jang News, Geo News TV channel, The News, and others.

== Personal life ==
Mir Shakil ur Rahman is the younger brother of former Jang Newspaper Editor Mir Javed ur Rahman (1945 – 2020), and is the second youngest child of Mehmooda Khalil ur Rahman (1926 – 2021) and the late Mir Khalil ur Rahman.

He resides in Dubai, United Arab Emirates with his two wives, Shahina and Erum, sharing five children (including Mir Ibrahim Rahman) with the former and four with the latter. He has a total of nine children, including four sons and five daughters.
