= Mir Ibrahim Rahman =

Pakistani media proprietor

- Born: 11 March 1977 (age 49); Karachi, Sindh, Pakistan
- Education: Karachi American School
- Alma mater: Babson College, Harvard Kennedy School
- Occupations: Co-founder and CEO of Geo News (2002–present)
- Board member of: Mir Khalil ur Rahman Foundation
- Spouse: Sheena Hadi (m. 2008)
- Children: 2
- Parent(s): Mir Shakil-ur-Rahman, Shahina Shakil
- Relatives: Mir Khalil-ur-Rahman (grandfather)
- Awards: Robert F. Kennedy Award for Excellence in Public Service

Mir Ibrahim Rahman (born 11 March 1977) is a Pakistani media proprietor who is the chief executive officer of the Geo Television Network.

== Early life and education ==
Mir Ibrahim Rahman was born on 11 March 1977 in Karachi, to media mogul father Mir Shakil-ur-Rahman and mother Shahina Shakil, the eldest of nine children. He is of Kashmiri descent, as his paternal great-grandparents were from Kashmir Valley.

Rahman studied at the Karachi American School and, after graduating, moved to the United States, where he received a BBA degree from Babson College in 2000. In the US, he started his career as an investment banker with Goldman Sachs. Two years later in 2002, he returned to Pakistan and joined his family media business, subsequently launching Pakistan's first private news channel and network, Geo TV, in the fall of that year along with his father. In 2009, he went back to the US and received his Master of Public Administration degree from the Harvard Kennedy School the following year.

Rahman is a recipient of the Robert F. Kennedy Award for Excellence in Public Service for his contribution towards the Lawyers' Movement, and was listed among the World Economic Forum's Young Global Leaders in 2011.

== Career ==
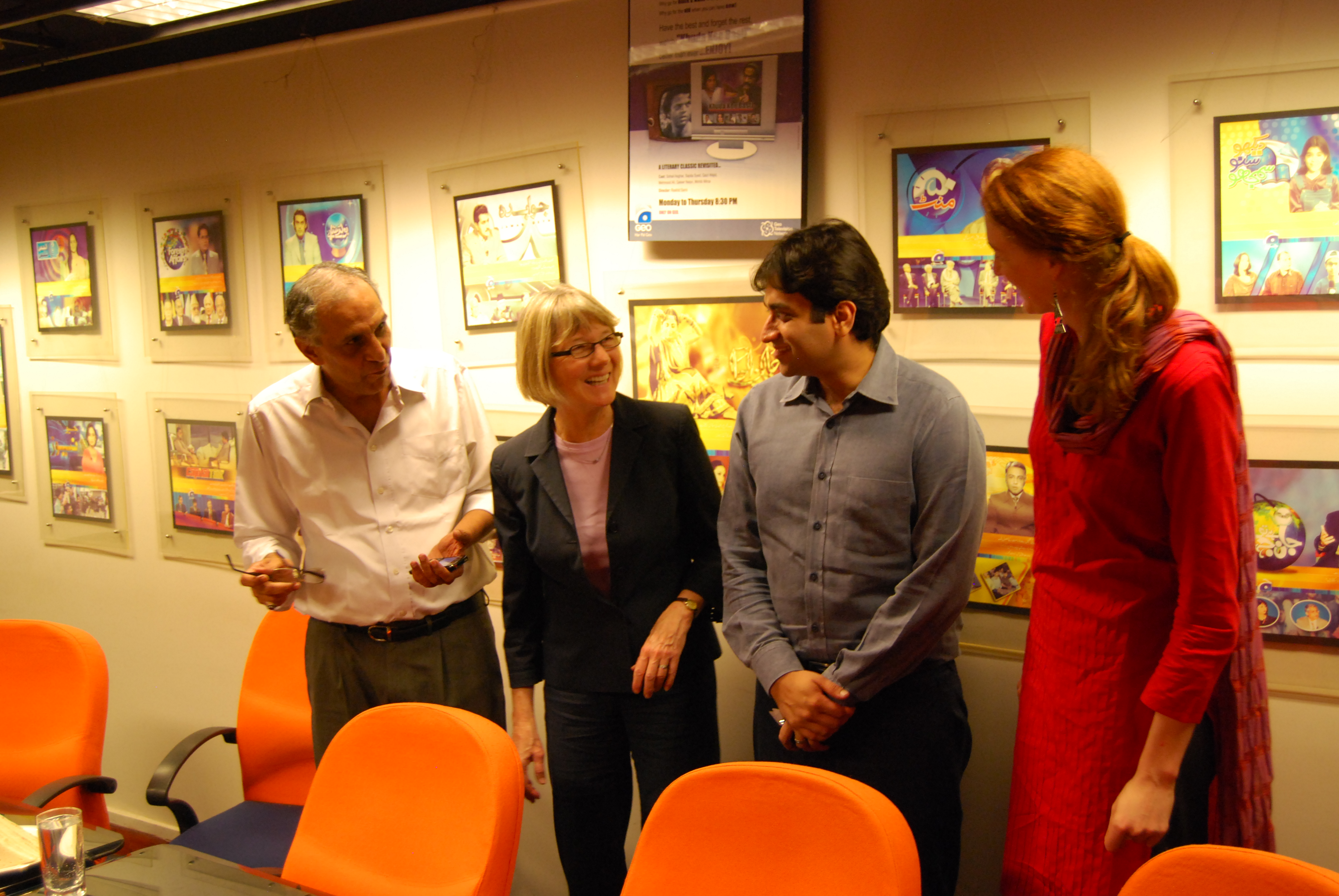
Mir Ibrahim Rahman (3rd from left) and Geo TV president Imran Aslam (far left) entertain Center for Global Development president Nancy Birdsall and senior analyst Molly Kinder on their visit to the Geo TV offices.

In 2000, Rahman graduated summa cum laude from Babson College with honours in economics, finance and entrepreneurship. After his graduation, he worked as an investment banker with Goldman Sachs specialising in media and telecom. After a brief stint with the investment banking and securities firm, he returned to Pakistan in 2002.

Until 2002, the electronic media in Pakistan was largely dominated by state-owned institutions like Pakistan Television Corporation and the Pakistan Broadcasting Corporation. This monopoly was thwarted when the Musharraf regime regulated electronic media allowing for private television channels to be operated independently. It was during this liberalisation of the media in Pakistan that Rahman saw an opportunity to expand his family business.

In 2002, he co-founded the privately owned television network, Geo TV. What started as a 5-member operation out of a hotel room turned into one of largest television broadcast networks in Pakistan. Geo TV was later recognised as a pertinent driver of change in the media landscape of the country. "Geo has changed Pakistan's media landscape, consistently challenging the monopoly-and monotony of state-run Pakistan Television, or PTV." "For the first time, analysts say, television in Pakistan is reflecting this predominantly Muslim country's diverse society and offering an independent source of news." Rahman has since served as the CEO of the television network that now employs more than 2,500 workers across the globe.

In 2009, he joined the Harvard University John F Kennedy School of Government while pursuing his master's degree in public administration. He later had to take a sabbatical alongside his wife Sheena following her pregnancy. Sheena was also a fellow Harvard alumni pursuing her master's degree in education. Rahman also serves as a member of the Young presidents' Organization in Pakistan, a charter member of the Indus Entrepreneur and the director of Mir Khalil ur Rahman Foundation.

== Awards and recognition ==
In 2010, Rahman and his television network were recognised for their "contribution in the historical Lawyers' Movement that revived independent judiciary in Pakistan". He became the first Muslim and the second South Asian to receive the prestigious Robert F. Kennedy Award for Excellence in Public Service from the Harvard Kennedy School.

== Profile of some initiatives ==
- “Zara Sochieye” (Just Think!) led a wave of debate on the controversial Hudood Ordinances, a set of laws passed without debate by the dictator General Zia-ul-Haq, enacted in 1977, equating rape with adultery. GEO's campaign, clarified the difference between man-made laws and divine law that the Hudood Ordinances was deliberately associated with. The campaign included testimony and unprecedented debate between the main liberal and conservative religious forces in the country and was credited to be the tipping point that led the Government to finally amend the ordinances. After much controversy and criticism from the Pakistani public, parts of the 1977 law were extensively revised in a 2006 amendment, called Women's Protection Bill by the Pakistani Parliament.
- Under Mir's supervision, GeoFilms launched its first films project titled Khuda Kay Liye (2007 film) which literally means 'In the Name of God' (2007 film) against whom a fatwa was issued by the terrorist leader of the Red Mosque, Islamabad. The project not only became Pakistani film industry's biggest blockbuster but also prompted much needed dialogue and discussion facing Islam and Pakistan today.
- GEO Network has been known to take on daring projects, including supporting the cause for justice, which created a tussle with the previous military and current civilian government. All of GEO's channels were shut down for almost 90 days, creating a net revenue loss of over $25 million. Most political analysts have been quoted to confirm GEO's role was unique in the country's historic independent judiciary movement and the eventual restoration of Chief Justice Iftikhar Muhammad Chaudhry.
- GEO took the daring lead to do stories on many important issues to not only educate the masses but also spread awareness on vital social issues like the polio vaccine, the MeToo Movement etc.
- GEO and Jang Group has tried to work for bigger causes that have a regional or global impact. The Group has worked on a project of peace between Pakistan and India in the past, working in collaboration with India's largest media group Times of India Group to launch a civilian peace initiative with India. The two largest and most influential media groups of Pakistan and India have committed to providing a platform where their audiences, readers and civil society can nudge their respective government to move towards lasting and fair peace so that valuable resources of both countries can be directed towards development and progress.

== Personal life ==
Mir Ibrahim Rahman belongs to a prominent media family. He is the eldest son of media mogul and philanthropist Mir Shakil-ur-Rahman, and the paternal grandson of newspaper magnate Mir Khalil-ur-Rahman. His extended family owns the Jang Group, one of the largest group of newspapers in Pakistan.

Rahman met Sheena Hadi during college at the Harvard Kennedy School in Cambridge, Massachusetts. They both eventually got married and have two children together, a daughter named Asha (born 2010) and a son named Mikayel (born 2014). The family currently resides in Karachi, Rahman’s hometown.
