= Mir Khalil-ur-Rehman =

Pakistani newspaper founder

Mir Khalil ur Rehman
- Born: 19 July 1921; Gujranwala, Punjab, British India (present-day Punjab, Pakistan)
- Died: 25 January 1992 (age 70 years); London, United Kingdom
- Citizenship: Pakistani
- Occupations: Journalist, Business Executive
- Known for: founder, chairman and editor of the Jang Group of Newspapers
- Spouse: Mehmooda Khalil ur Rahman (m. 1943-1992)
- Relatives: Mir Shakil-ur-Rahman (son)

Mir Khalil ur Rahman (19 July 1921 – 25 January 1992) was a Pakistani newspaper editor and founder of the Jang Group of Newspapers, which currently publishes several Urdu and English newspapers in Pakistan. A self-made newspaper magnate, he ranks among the most successful newspaper entrepreneurs of Pakistan.

== Early life and education ==
Mir Khalil ur Rahman was born on 19 July 1921 in Gujranwala, Punjab, the son of Mir Aziz ur Rahman, a businessman, and his wife, a schoolteacher, both immigrants from a Kashmiri business family which migrated from Kashmir Valley to Punjab, due to the economic situation. He received his basic schooling from here as well, though he matriculated from the Fatehpuri Muslim High School in Delhi and eventually went on to receive a degree from the Daryaganj Commercial College, also in Delhi.

In 1935, at age 14, Rahman and his family moved from Gujranwala to New Delhi, now the capital of India. He attended high school here and it was also the place where he discovered his love for journalism. The world of newspapers attracted him far more than the dull books of accounting. He often sat, glued to his radio set, listening to the latest war news.

By 1940, then having become a college student, he started and founded a newspaper and magazine publishing company for the Muslims of British India during World War II in Delhi. He called it Jang, Urdu for “war”. Some of his critics said at the time that he encouraged more war hysteria by selecting a name like that for his newspaper, but Rahman made it clear that he was doing it for the soldiers and not to encourage the Second World War.

== Career ==
After the independence of Pakistan was declared on 14 August 1947, Mir Khalil moved to Karachi, the former capital of the newly founded nation at the time, and started publishing the Daily Jang from there, making Karachi the new headquarters for Jang Newspapers. The company was soon funded by a loan of 5,000 PKR from Abdul Ghani Barq of the Ferozsons Publishers of Lahore. Pakistan's first Governor General and founder, Muhammad Ali Jinnah, was delighted by this move and offered the government's help in running it. Mir, however, declined the offer, saying that the freedom of the press was his motto and goal for journalism in Pakistan. Mir also contributed to the founding of the Council of Pakistan Newspaper Editors. He opposed tooth and nail of any government measures or actions which curbed the freedom of press in the country.

== Death ==
Mir Khalil ur Rahman died on 25 January 1992 in London, United Kingdom, at the age of 70.

Some time before his death, Rahman was diagnosed with lung cancer, and was flown to the city of London for medical treatment. There, he was further diagnosed with tracheostomy, having only one functioning lung, subsequently requiring surgery.

On the evening of 25 January, shortly after his seemingly successful surgery, Rahman unexpectedly suffered a cardiac arrest while on the ventilator. That night, the doctors confirmed that he had died, his family members by his side at the time of his demise.

== Personal life ==
Mir Khalil ur Rahman was married to Mehmooda Khalil ur Rahman (1926 - 2021) from 1943 till 1992, following his death. Together, they had seven children; five daughters and two sons (including Mir Shakil-ur-Rahman and the late Mir Javed ur Rahman).

Mir Khalil was the eldest of his siblings, having three brothers (including one half) and two sisters (with one half as well). His father, Mir Aziz ur Rahman, had two wives. He and his first wife shared three children together; Mir Khalil himself, followed by Mir Habib and Surraya Khanum (née Aziz ur Rahman). Mir Aziz also had three children with his second wife, namely Mir Jamil, Mir Nasir and Tahira Baqa (née Aziz), who is Khalil’s only living sibling.

Aside from his love for newspapers and journalism, Rahman had a strong passion for cleanliness, as well as reading and writing. He was also extremely fond of recycling, as he despised the unnecessary wastage of things.
