= Jang Media Group =

Pakistani newspaper publishing company

- Type: Media conglomerate
- Founder: Mir Khalil-ur-Rehman
- Headquarters: Karachi, Sindh, Pakistan
- Key people: Mir Shakil-ur-Rahman; Mir Ibrahim Rahman
- Parent: Independent Media Corporation
- Website: jang.com.pk

Jang Media Group (Urdu: جنگ میڈیا گروپ), also known as Geo Group, is a Pakistani media conglomerate and a subsidiary of Dubai-based company Independent Media Corporation. It has headquarters in Printing House, Karachi.

It is the publisher of the Urdu language newspaper the Daily Jang, The News International, Mag Weekly, and operates Geo News and Geo TV channels.

Mir Shakil-ur-Rahman is the current Editor-in-Chief.

== History ==
Mir Khalil ur Rehman, a businessman of Kashmiri descent, founded the Jang Group at the end of World War II. As of 2011, his eldest son, Mir Javed ur Rehman, is the group chairman and the executive director. Javed's younger brother Mir Shakil-ur-Rahman is group chief executive and editor in chief. Independent Media Corporation is a multi-media corporation and owns the Jang Group of Newspapers and the Geo Television Network based in Karachi. Mir Ibrahim Rahman is the chief executive of Geo Television Network and Imran Aslam was its President.

== Publications ==
=== Current ===
- Daily Jang - original flagship newspaper of the Group in the Urdu language. Group Editor: Mehmood Sham in Karachi. Newspaper editions are issued in Karachi, Lahore, Rawalpindi, Peshawar, Multan and London, with the largest daily circulation in Pakistan among Urdu newspapers
- The News International - daily newspaper in English started in 1991
- Akhbar-e-Jahan - a weekly magazine in Urdu started in 1967
- Inquilab
- Waqt
- Kaisa Hoga, an annual publication in partnership with The Economist

=== Defunct ===
- Daily Awam

== TV channels ==
It also runs many TV channels as part of the Geo Television Network starting with its flagship channel Geo TV in 2002. It has since launched several other channels in which the news, music and sports sectors are targeted. Their broadcast channel services are provided to the viewers in the UK, the US, Canada, and the Middle East as well as in Pakistan.

=== Pakistan ===
- Geo News HD – a Pakistan-based Urdu news channel
- GEO Super HD – (sports channel), launched by Geo Network in September 2006. Programming content includes a variety of sports from around the world, focusing mainly on cricket and field hockey with a secondary focus on boxing, football (soccer), and tennis.
- Geo Entertainment HD – a Pakistan based entertainment channel showing drama serials, musical programs, feature movies, primarily in Urdu.
- Geo Kahani HD – a Pakistan-based channel devoted exclusively to drama serials
- Geo Tez HD - a channel airing headlines every 15 minutes and Geo News programme repeats

=== International ===
- Geo News HD UK, ME.
- Geo News HD USA, Canada.
- Geo Entertainment HD UK
- Geo Entertainment HD USA
- Geo Entertainment HD ME
- Geo Kahani HD UK

=== Shot down Default ===
- Aag Tv Music - Pakistan
- Aag Tv Music - Europe
- Geo English - Pakistan
- Geo English - Europe
- Fire Records (Pakistan) a Pakistani Record Label.

=== Geo Films ===
Geo Films is a film production and distribution company owned by Geo Television Network based in Karachi, Pakistan. Geo Films distributes international and Pakistani films in cinemas across Pakistan.

- Khuda Kay Liye
- Ramchand Pakistani
- Bol
- Manto
- Wajood
- Teefa in Trouble
- Wrong No. 2
- Ishrat Made in China
- The Legend of Maula Jatt
- Deemak

=== myco x Geo Super join forces ===
Myco and Geo Super have partnered to revolutionize sports broadcasting in Pakistan through 2027 by combining digital and TV coverage. Myco holds exclusive digital rights for ICC events, while Geo Super handles television, offering viewers a seamless experience across platforms. This partnership includes collaboration with PTV Filx, Jazz Tamasha, Tapmad, and ARY Plus.

== List of companies ==
- Geo A&B Productions
- United News Network
- Independent Motion Pictures
- Pakistan Ink and Packaging Industries
- khudi ventures

=== Broadcasting ===
The following broadcasting companies are owned by the Jang Group.

- Independent Media Corporation (Private) Limited
- Independent Newspapers Corporation (Private) Limited
- Independent Music Group (Private) Limited
- Interlink Multimedia (IMM) (Private) Limited
- Clarity Communications (Private) Limited
- Cross Currents (Private) Limited
- Geo Entertainment Media Holding (Private) Limited
- Geo Entertainment Television (Private) Limited
