= Celebrity Jeopardy! =

American television quiz show

- Genre: Game show
- Created by: Merv Griffin
- Directed by: Lucinda Owens Margolis; Russell Norman
- Presented by: Mayim Bialik; Ken Jennings
- Narrated by: Johnny Gilbert
- Ending theme: "Think!"
- Composers: John Hoke (Bleeding Fingers Music); Chris Bell Music & Sound Design (Note: Original theme composed by Merv Griffin)
- Country of origin: United States
- Original language: English
- No. of seasons: 4
- No. of episodes: 49

Production
- Executive producer: Michael Davies
- Producer: Sarah Whitcomb Foss
- Production company: Sony Pictures (Note: As Sony Pictures Television Studios in season 1, as well as certain episodes in season 2, and Sony Pictures Television in most episodes of season 2, as well as seasons 3 and 4)

Original release
- Network: ABC
- Release: September 25, 2022 – present

Related
- Jeopardy!

Celebrity Jeopardy! is an American game show spin-off of Jeopardy! that consists of multi-episode tournaments featuring celebrities as contestants. Their winnings in the tournaments are donated to a charity of their choice.

Since 1992, the syndicated Jeopardy! had featured special celebrity episodes. In 2022, Celebrity Jeopardy! began airing as a standalone primetime series; the first season premiered on September 25, 2022, on ABC with Mayim Bialik as the host. In May 2023, the series was renewed for a second season, which premiered on September 27, 2023, with Ken Jennings replacing Bialik as host. In November 2023, it was announced that the second part of the second season would resume on Tuesday nights starting January 2, 2024. In May 2024, the series was renewed for a third season, which premiered on January 8, 2025. In May 2025, the series was renewed for a fourth season, known as Celebrity Jeopardy! All-Stars, which premiered on March 13, 2026. In May 2026, ABC renewed the series for a fifth season, which is set to premiere on January 29, 2027.

== Format ==
The series consists of a bracket tournament with three rounds with a prize pot of $2,190,000 (Note: $2,130,000 in Season 4 (All-Stars)) for charity. In the non-All Stars seasons, 27 contestants compete in nine quarterfinal games, (Note: In Season 4 (All-Stars), there are twenty-one contestants, with eighteen competing in six quarterfinals games. The remaining three contestants, who previously won the tournament in prior seasons, will automatically be in the semifinals.) with the winners advancing to three semifinal games. The winners of each semifinal game advance to the finals, whose winner receives a $1,000,000 grand prize for their chosen charity, the title of "Celebrity Jeopardy! Champion," and an entry to the Tournament of Champions. Contestants eliminated in the quarterfinals earned $30,000 for their charities, while those eliminated in the semifinals earned $50,000. In Seasons 1 and 2, third place in the finals earned $100,000, while second place earned $250,000. In season 3, the non-winning finalists will receive $175,000. (Note: In Season 4 (All-Stars), the non-winning finalists will receive $200,000.)

In the All Stars season, 18 contestants competed in six preliminary matches; the winners of the first three seasons were given byes to the semifinals.

== Gameplay ==
The structure of each episode is similar to the regular Jeopardy! show, with clues based on 1984–2001 clue values. The "Jeopardy!" round is played with clues ranging from $100 to $500, with one Daily Double hidden among them, allowing whoever selects it to wager some or all of their score on the clue. It is followed by the "Double Jeopardy!" round, where clue values are doubled and there are two hidden Daily Double clues.

Celebrity Jeopardy! games include a third "Triple Jeopardy!" round, similar to international one-hour versions of the game. Clue values are tripled, resulting in $300 to $1,500 with three Daily Doubles. Typically, one category in the third round (usually the sixth) in season 1 is played with a champion presenting clues. Buzzy Cohen (episode 1), Austin Rogers (episode 2), current host Ken Jennings (episode 3), Ryan Long (episode 5), Brad Rutter (episode 6), Matt Amodio (episode 8), Colby Burnett (episode 9), Mattea Roach (episode 10), Amy Schneider (episode 12), and James Holzhauer (episode 13) have presented categories.

"Final Jeopardy!" is played after the third round, where traditional rules for celebrity tournaments apply (players with $0 or negative money are given an amount to participate; $1,000 in season one, $500 from season two onwards). Contestants will first receive the category, then wager any amount from $0 to their current score. They then receive the clue and must write their response in 30 seconds. Players' wagers are added to their score if they were correct, and subtracted if they were incorrect. The player with the highest score at the end of "Final Jeopardy!" wins the game; otherwise, a sudden-death category will be imposed to the tied players, provided they have at least a buck, and whoever rings in with the correct question wins it; however, if all tied players get it incorrectly the process is repeated until someone wins it.

== Contestants ==
=== Season 1 (2022–23) ===
A total of 27 contestants competed in Season 1. Known contestants are listed here in the order of their initial episode and with the charities they played for.

- Simu Liu (Stop AAPI Hate)
- Ego Nwodim (God's Love We Deliver)
- Andy Richter (Los Angeles Regional Food Bank)
- Eddie Huang (Innocence Project)
- Reggie Watts (MusiCares)
- Iliza Shlesinger (Cystic Fibrosis Foundation)
- Constance Wu (Asian Mental Health Collective)
- Ike Barinholtz (Pacific Clinics)
- Jalen Rose (Operation Graduation, Jalen Rose Leadership Academy)
- Aisha Tyler (Planned Parenthood)
- John Michael Higgins (Actors' Equity Foundation)
- Matt Rogers (Story Pirates Changemaker)
- Troian Bellisario (War Child)
- Wil Wheaton (National Women's Law Center)
- Hasan Minhaj (International Rescue Committee)
- Ray Romano (Harvest Home)
- Joel Kim Booster (SELAH Neighborhood Homeless Collation)
- Melissa Rauch (Oscar's Kids)
- Michael Cera (Saving Mothers)
- Brianne Howey (Save the Children)
- Zoë Chao (Hour Children)
- Patton Oswalt (Alice's Kids)
- Candace Parker (Mamba & Mambacita Sports Foundation)
- Torrey DeVitto (Planned Parenthood)
- B. J. Novak (Stand Up 2 Cancer)
- Brendan Hunt (Soccer Without Borders)
- Cari Champion (NAACP Empowerment Programs)

=== Season 2 (2023–24) ===
A total of 27 contestants competed in Season 2. Known contestants are listed here in the order of their initial episode and with the charities they played for.

- Mark Duplass (BlinkNow)
- Emily Hampshire (GLAAD)
- Utkarsh Ambudkar (SAG-AFTRA Foundation supporting the Emergency Financial Assistance and Disaster Relief Fund)
- Brian Baumgartner (Motion Picture & Television Fund)
- Lisa Ann Walter (Entertainment Community Fund)
- Timothy Simons (Friends of LAHSA)
- Christopher Meloni (The Global Lyme Alliance)
- Sherri Shepherd (Move-In Day Mafia Initiative at Project Dreamlight)
- Katie Nolan (Association for Women in Sports Media)
- Steven Weber (SAG-AFTRA Foundation)
- Shane Battier (The Battier Take Charge Foundation)
- Melissa Fumero (International Community Foundation supporting This is About Humanity)
- Mira Sorvino (UN Trust Fund for Victims of Human Trafficking)
- Adam Rodriguez (Lift LA)
- Peter Schrager (Baby Quest Foundation)
- Dulé Hill (All Rise)
- Sheryl Underwood (Pack Rat Foundation for Education)
- Peter Facinelli (American Red Cross supporting the Hawaii Wildfire Fund)
- Macaulay Culkin (San Diego Zoo Wildlife Alliance)
- Rachel Dratch (City Harvest)
- Becky Lynch (The V Foundation supporting Connor's Cure)
- Cynthia Nixon (SAG-AFTRA Foundation)
- Cedric the Entertainer (SSM Health Foundation)
- Heather McMahan (City of Refuge)
- Kyra Sedgwick (Food Bank For New York City)
- Mo Rocca (Inner-City Scholarship Fund)
- Amanda Seales (Rockefeller Philanthropy Advisors supporting Grantmakers for Girls of Color)

=== Season 3 (2025) ===
A total of 27 contestants competed in Season 3. Here is a list of known contestants that played, and the charities they played for:

- Max Greenfield (Wags and Walks)
- Camilla Luddington (I Stand With My Pack)
- W. Kamau Bell (DonorsChoose)
- Melissa Peterman (Diana DiSalvatore Nursing Scholarship at St. Catherine University)
- Neil deGrasse Tyson (STRIVE)
- Jackie Tohn (PATH)
- Rachel Brosnahan (Covenant House NY)
- Seth Green (LA Regional Food Bank)
- Margaret Cho (Friendly House Inc.)
- Roy Wood Jr. (I See Me, Inc.)
- Brian Jordan Alvarez (Communities In Schools)
- Phoebe Robinson (Product Red)
- Chris Distefano (34.3 Foundation)
- Natalie Morales (Happy Trails for Kids)
- Corbin Bleu (Entertainment Community Fund)
- Susie Essman (City Harvest)
- Blake Anderson (Turtle Conservancy)
- Robin Thede (Women in Film)
- Ana Navarro (Maestro Cares Foundation)
- David Friedberg (Humane Society)
- Yvette Nicole Brown (DonorsChoose)
- Sean Gunn (Women for Women International)
- D'Arcy Carden (AmeriCares)
- Sherry Cola (Teach AAPI)
- Omar J. Dorsey (DeKalb School of the Arts Foundation)
- Mina Kimes (SELAH Neighborhood Homeless Coalition)
- Fortune Feimster (MANNA FoodBank)

=== Season 4 (All-Stars, 2026) ===
A total of 21 returning contestants from the first three seasons competed in Season 4.

- Rachel Dratch (Family Reach)
- Mark Duplass (The Souls Point Fund)
- Katie Nolan (The Trevor Project)
- Macaulay Culkin (Stand Up to Cancer)
- Steven Weber (New Directions for Veterans)
- Jackie Tohn (Kids in the Spotlight)
- Sean Gunn (Women for Women International)
- Cynthia Nixon (Doctors Without Borders USA)
- Roy Wood Jr. (I See Me, Inc.)
- Mina Kimes (SELAH Neighborhood Homeless Coalition)
- Andy Richter (Los Angeles Regional Food Bank)
- Timothy Simons (Silver Lake Children's Theatre Group)
- Robin Thede (Black Girls Code)
- Patton Oswalt (Alice's Kids)
- Margaret Cho (Friendly House Inc.)
- Mo Rocca (Inner-City Scholarship Fund)
- Mira Sorvino (Voluntary Trust Fund for Victims of Trafficking in Persons)
- Ray Romano (Harvest Home)
- Lisa Ann Walter (Fund for Women's Equality)
- W. Kamau Bell (DonorsChoose)
- Ike Barinholtz (Noonan Syndrome Foundation)

== Episodes ==
Dates listed are the original air dates of the respective episodes. Contestants are listed top-to-bottom based on their left-to-right podium positions on that episode.

=== Season 1 (2022–23) ===
During the first season, each batch of three quarterfinal matches was followed immediately by a semifinal with the three winners.

Quarterfinals
Episode 1 (September 25, 2022)
Simu Liu	$23,200
Ego Nwodim	$0
Andy Richter	$18,900
Episode 2 (October 2, 2022)
Eddie Huang	$0
Reggie Watts	$2,700
Iliza Shlesinger	$14,401
Episode 3 (October 9, 2022)
Constance Wu	$0
Ike Barinholtz	$46,001
Jalen Rose	$0 (Note: Rose finished the "Triple Jeopardy!" round with –$1,300.)
Episode 5 (October 23, 2022)
Aisha Tyler	$24,200
John Michael Higgins	$31,400
Matt Rogers	$30,500
Episode 6 (October 30, 2022)
Troian Bellisario	$2,901
Wil Wheaton	$28,201
Hasan Minhaj	$0
Episode 7 (November 6, 2022)
Ray Romano	$42
Joel Kim Booster	$19,000
Melissa Rauch	$0
Episode 9 (January 5, 2023)
Michael Cera	$20,000
Brianne Howey	$2,000
Zoë Chao	$0
Episode 10 (January 12, 2023)
Patton Oswalt	$54,400
Candace Parker	$1,960
Torrey DeVitto	$3,200
Episode 11 (January 19, 2023)
B. J. Novak	$6,800
Brendan Hunt	$28,000
Cari Champion	$100

Semifinals
Episode 4 (October 16, 2022)
Ike Barinholtz	$22,601
Simu Liu	$20,000
Iliza Shlesinger	$0
Episode 8 (November 13, 2022)
John Michael Higgins	$10,800
Wil Wheaton	$42,200
Joel Kim Booster	$38,600
Episode 12 (January 26, 2023)
Patton Oswalt	$24,600
Brendan Hunt	$20,700
Michael Cera	$0

Final
Episode 13 (February 2, 2023)
Wil Wheaton	$23,000
Patton Oswalt	$72,000
Ike Barinholtz	$72,001

=== Season 2 (2023–24) ===
For the second season, all quarterfinal matches aired consecutively, followed by the semifinals and finals. Matches did not necessarily air in production order. Due to filming commitments, the winner's invitation to the Tournament of Champions is delayed to Season 42 (2026).

Quarterfinals
Episode 1 (September 27, 2023)
Mark Duplass	$30,197
Emily Hampshire	$0 (Note: Hampshire finished the "Triple Jeopardy!" round with –$1,100.)
Utkarsh Ambudkar	$30,201
Episode 5 (October 25, 2023)
Mira Sorvino	$24,200
Adam Rodriguez	$5,000
Peter Schrager	$19,000
Episode 2 (October 4, 2023)
Brian Baumgartner	$12,399
Lisa Ann Walter	$16,700
Timothy Simons	$16,600
Episode 4 (October 18, 2023)
Steven Weber	$25,000
Shane Battier	$21,400
Melissa Fumero	$900 (Note: Fumero finished the "Triple Jeopardy!" round with –$1,000.)
Episode 3 (October 11, 2023)
Christopher Meloni	$17,600
Sherri Shepherd	$75
Katie Nolan	$17,600 (Note: Won the game via tiebreaker.)
Episode 6 (November 1, 2023)
Dulé Hill	$10,000
Sheryl Underwood	$200
Peter Facinelli	$0
Episode 7 (November 15, 2023)
Macaulay Culkin	$33,600
Rachel Dratch	$33,601
Becky Lynch	$1,000 (Note: Lynch finished the "Triple Jeopardy!" round with –$500.)
Episode 9 (December 6, 2023)
Kyra Sedgwick	$0
Mo Rocca	$25,200
Amanda Seales	$12,300
Episode 8 (November 29, 2023)
Cynthia Nixon	$8,199
Cedric the Entertainer	$8,200
Heather McMahan	$20,600

Semifinals
Episode 10 (January 2, 2024)
Utkarsh Ambudkar	$16,800
Mira Sorvino	$0
Lisa Ann Walter	$32,201
Episode 11 (January 9, 2024)
Steven Weber	$0
Katie Nolan	$17,400
Dulé Hill	$0
Episode 12 (January 16, 2024)
Rachel Dratch	$18,900
Mo Rocca	$38,100
Heather McMahan	$0

Final
Episode 13 (January 23, 2024)
Mo Rocca	$1,100
Lisa Ann Walter	$27,500
Katie Nolan	$0

=== Season 3 (2025) ===
For the third season, as with the previous season, all quarterfinal matches aired consecutively, followed by the semifinals and finals.

Quarterfinals
Episode 1 (January 8, 2025)
Max Greenfield	$0
Camilla Luddington	$1,200
W. Kamau Bell	$11,009
Episode 2 (January 15, 2025)
Melissa Peterman	$2,899
Neil deGrasse Tyson	$8,399
Jackie Tohn	$12,400
Episode 3 (January 22, 2025)
Rachel Brosnahan	$1
Seth Green	$5,550
Margaret Cho	$54,100
Episode 4 (January 29, 2025)
Roy Wood Jr.	$22,200
Brian Jordan Alvarez	$15,200
Phoebe Robinson	$0
Episode 5 (February 5, 2025)
Chris Distefano	$8,910
Natalie Morales	$24,000
Corbin Bleu	$1
Episode 6 (February 12, 2025)
Susie Essman	$4,000
Blake Anderson	$498 (Note: Anderson finished the "Triple Jeopardy!" round with –$1,100.)
Robin Thede	$25,600
Episode 7 (February 26, 2025)
Ana Navarro	$0
David Friedberg	$3,599
Yvette Nicole Brown	$1,918
Episode 8 (March 5, 2025)
Sean Gunn	$19,200
D'Arcy Carden	$0 (Note: Carden finished the "Triple Jeopardy!" round with $0.)
Sherry Cola	$2,300
Episode 9 (March 12, 2025)
Omar J. Dorsey	$2,800
Mina Kimes	$19,400
Fortune Feimster	$2,100

Semifinals
Episode 10 (April 2, 2025)
Margaret Cho	$0
Jackie Tohn	$1
W. Kamau Bell	$25,699
Episode 11 (April 9, 2025)
Robin Thede	$13,200
Natalie Morales	$1,000 (Note: Morales finished the "Triple Jeopardy!" round with -$1,300.)
Roy Wood Jr.	$1
Episode 12 (April 16, 2025)
Mina Kimes	$16,000
Sean Gunn	$9,999
David Friedberg	$17,397

Final
Episode 13 (April 23, 2025)
W. Kamau Bell	$27,199
David Friedberg	$1,399
Robin Thede	$3,799

=== Season 4 (All-Stars, 2026) ===
The fourth season was an All-Star edition, featuring previous notable contestants from the first three seasons.

Each of the champions of the previous seasons (Ike Barinholtz, Lisa Ann Walter, and W. Kamau Bell) are automatically given a spot in the semifinals.

Quarterfinals
Episode 5 (May 1, 2026)
Robin Thede	$35,400
Patton Oswalt	$47,800
Margaret Cho	$22,000
Episode 6 (May 8, 2026)
Mo Rocca	$21,900
Mira Sorvino	$33,200
Ray Romano	$42
Episode 3 (March 27, 2026)
Sean Gunn	$19,000
Cynthia Nixon	$0
Roy Wood Jr.	$0
Episode 2 (March 20, 2026)
Macaulay Culkin	$17,600
Steven Weber	$17,900
Jackie Tohn	$5,499
Episode 1 (March 13, 2026)
Rachel Dratch	$6,299
Mark Duplass	$0
Katie Nolan	$30,801
Episode 4 (April 17, 2026)
Mina Kimes	$17,100
Andy Richter	$11,199
Timothy Simons	$0

Semifinals
Episode 9 (May 14, 2026)
Ike Barinholtz	$23,500
Patton Oswalt	$3,600
Mira Sorvino	$0
Episode 8 (May 13, 2026)
W. Kamau Bell	$3,600
Sean Gunn	$6,300
Steven Weber	$12,800
Episode 7 (May 12, 2026)
Lisa Ann Walter	$2,600
Katie Nolan	$5,100
Mina Kimes	$5,790

Final
Episode 10 (May 15, 2026)
Ike Barinholtz	$10,200
Steven Weber	$2,700
Mina Kimes	$21,410

== Ratings ==
The premiere episode of Celebrity Jeopardy! averaged 4.03 million viewers, placing 33rd for the week, 22nd among non-sports programs and second among ABC's non-sports programs.

=== Season 1 ===
Viewership and ratings per episode of Celebrity Jeopardy!
No.	Title	Air date	Rating (18–49)	Viewers (millions)
1	"Quarterfinal #1: Simu Liu, Ego Nwodim and Andy Richter"	September 25, 2022	0.4	4.03
2	"Quarterfinal #2: Eddie Huang, Reggie Watts and Iliza Shlesinger"	October 2, 2022	0.4	3.50
3	"Quarterfinal #3: Constance Wu, Ike Barinholtz and Jalen Rose"	October 9, 2022	0.4	3.57
4	"Semifinal #1: Ike Barinholtz, Simu Liu, and Iliza Shlesinger"	October 16, 2022	0.4	3.36
5	"Quarterfinal #4: Aisha Tyler, John Michael Higgins and Matt Rogers"	October 23, 2022	0.5	3.66
6	"Quarterfinal #5: Troian Bellisario, Wil Wheaton and Hasan Minhab"	October 30, 2022	0.3	3.18
7	"Quarterfinal #6: Ray Romano, Joel Kim Booster and Melissa Rauch"	November 6, 2022	0.4	3.50
8	"Semifinal #2: John Michael Higgins, Wil Wheaton and Joel Kim Booster"	November 13, 2022	0.5	3.82
9	"Quarterfinal #7: Michael Cera, Brianne Howey and Zoë Chao"	January 5, 2023	0.6	4.11
10	"Quarterfinal #8: Patton Oswalt, Candace Parker and Torrey DeVitto"	January 12, 2023	0.6	3.97
11	"Quarterfinal #9: B.J. Novak, Brendan Hunt and Cari Champion"	January 19, 2023	0.5	4.16
12	"Semifinal #3: Patton Oswalt, Brendan Hunt and Michael Cera"	January 26, 2023	0.6	4.44
13	"Final: Wil Wheaton, Patton Oswalt and Ike Barinholtz"	February 2, 2023	0.7	4.84

=== Season 2 ===
Viewership and ratings per episode of Celebrity Jeopardy!
No.	Title	Air date	Rating (18–49)	Viewers (millions)
1	"Quarterfinal #1: Mark Duplass, Emily Hampshire and Utkarsh Ambudkar"	September 27, 2023	0.5	3.59
2	"Quarterfinal #2: Brian Baumgartner, Lisa Ann Walter and Timothy Simons"	October 4, 2023	0.4	3.63
3	"Quarterfinal #3: Christopher Meloni, Sherri Shepherd and Katie Nolan"	October 11, 2023	0.4	4.00
4	"Quarterfinal #4: Steven Weber, Shane Battier and Melissa Fumero"	October 18, 2023	0.4	3.96
5	"Quarterfinal #5: Mira Sorvino, Adam Rodriguez and Peter Schrager"	October 25, 2023	0.4	3.88
6	"Quarterfinal #6: Dulé Hill, Sheryl Underwood and Peter Facinelli"	November 1, 2023	0.4	3.86
7	"Quarterfinal #7: Macaulay Culkin, Rachel Dratch and Becky Lynch"	November 15, 2023	0.5	4.24
8	"Quarterfinal #8: Cynthia Nixon, Cedric the Entertainer and Heather McMahan"	November 29, 2023	0.4	3.80
9	"Quarterfinal #9: Kyra Sedgwick, Mo Rocca and Amanda Seales"	December 6, 2023	0.4	3.81
10	"Semifinal #1: Utkarsh Ambudkar, Mira Sorvino and Lisa Ann Walter"	January 2, 2024	0.5	4.54
11	"Semifinal #2: Steven Weber, Katie Nolan and Dulé Hill"	January 9, 2024	0.5	4.56
12	"Semifinal #3: Rachel Dratch, Mo Rocca and Heather McMahan"	January 16, 2024	0.6	4.53
13	"Final: Mo Rocca, Lisa Ann Walter and Katie Nolan"	January 23, 2024	0.5	4.27

=== Season 3 ===
Viewership and ratings per episode of Celebrity Jeopardy!
No.	Title	Air date	Rating (18–49)	Viewers (millions)
1	"Quarterfinal #1: Max Greenfield, Camilla Luddington, and W. Kamau Bell"	January 8, 2025	0.4	3.03
2	"Quarterfinal #2: Melissa Peterman, Neil deGrasse Tyson and Jackie Tohn"	January 15, 2025	0.3	2.65
3	"Quarterfinal #3: Rachel Brosnahan, Seth Green and Margaret Cho"	January 22, 2025	0.3	2.52
4	"Quarterfinal #4: Roy Wood Jr., Brian Jordan Alvarez and Phoebe Robinson"	January 29, 2025	0.2	1.84
5	"Quarterfinal #5: Chris Distefano, Natalie Morales and Corbin Bleu"	February 5, 2025	0.3	2.17
6	"Quarterfinal #6: Susie Essman, Blake Anderson and Robin Thede"	February 12, 2025	0.3	2.01
7	"Quarterfinal #7: Ana Navarro, David Friedberg and Yvette Nicole Brown"	February 26, 2025	0.2	1.80
8	"Quarterfinal #8: Sean Gunn, D'Arcy Carden and Sherry Cola"	March 5, 2025	0.2	1.86
9	"Quarterfinal #9: Omar J. Dorsey, Mina Kimes and Fortune Feimster"	March 12, 2025	0.2	2.08
10	"Semifinal #1: W. Kamau Bell, Margaret Cho and Jackie Tohn"	April 2, 2025	0.2	1.89
11	"Semifinal #2: Roy Wood Jr., Natalie Morales and Robin Thede"	April 9, 2025	0.3	2.00
12	"Semifinal #3: David Friedberg, Sean Gunn and Mina Kimes"	April 16, 2025	0.3	1.81
13	"Final: W. Kamau Bell, Robin Thede and Dave Friedberg"	April 23, 2025	0.2	1.84

=== Season 4 ===
Viewership and ratings per episode of Celebrity Jeopardy!
No.	Title	Air date	Rating (18–49)	Viewers (millions)
1	"QUARTERFINAL #1: Rachel Dratch, Mark Duplass and Katie Nolan"	March 13, 2026	TBD	TBD
2	"QUARTERFINAL #2: Macaulay Culkin, Steven Weber and Jackie Tohn"	March 20, 2026	TBD	TBD
3	"QUARTERFINAL #3: Sean Gunn, Cynthia Nixon and Roy Wood Jr."	March 27, 2026	TBD	TBD
4	"QUARTERFINAL #4: Mina Kimes, Andy Richter and Timothy Simons"	April 17, 2026	TBD	TBD
5	"QUARTERFINAL #5: Robin Thede, Patton Oswalt and Margaret Cho"	May 1, 2026	TBD	TBD
6	"QUARTERFINAL #6: Ray Romano, Mira Sorvino and Mo Rocca"	May 8, 2026	TBD	TBD
7	"SEMIFINAL #1: Lisa Ann Walter, Katie Nolan and Mina Kimes"	May 12, 2026	TBD	TBD
8	"SEMIFINAL #2: W. Kamau Bell, Steven Weber and Sean Gunn"	May 13, 2026	TBD	TBD
9	"SEMIFINAL #3: Ike Barinholtz, Patton Oswalt and Mira Sorvino"	May 14, 2026	TBD	TBD
10	"FINAL: Ike Barinholtz, Steven Weber and Mina Kimes"	May 15, 2026	TBD	TBD
