= K. C. Spinelli =

Canadian professional wrestler (born 1985)

Kc Spinelli
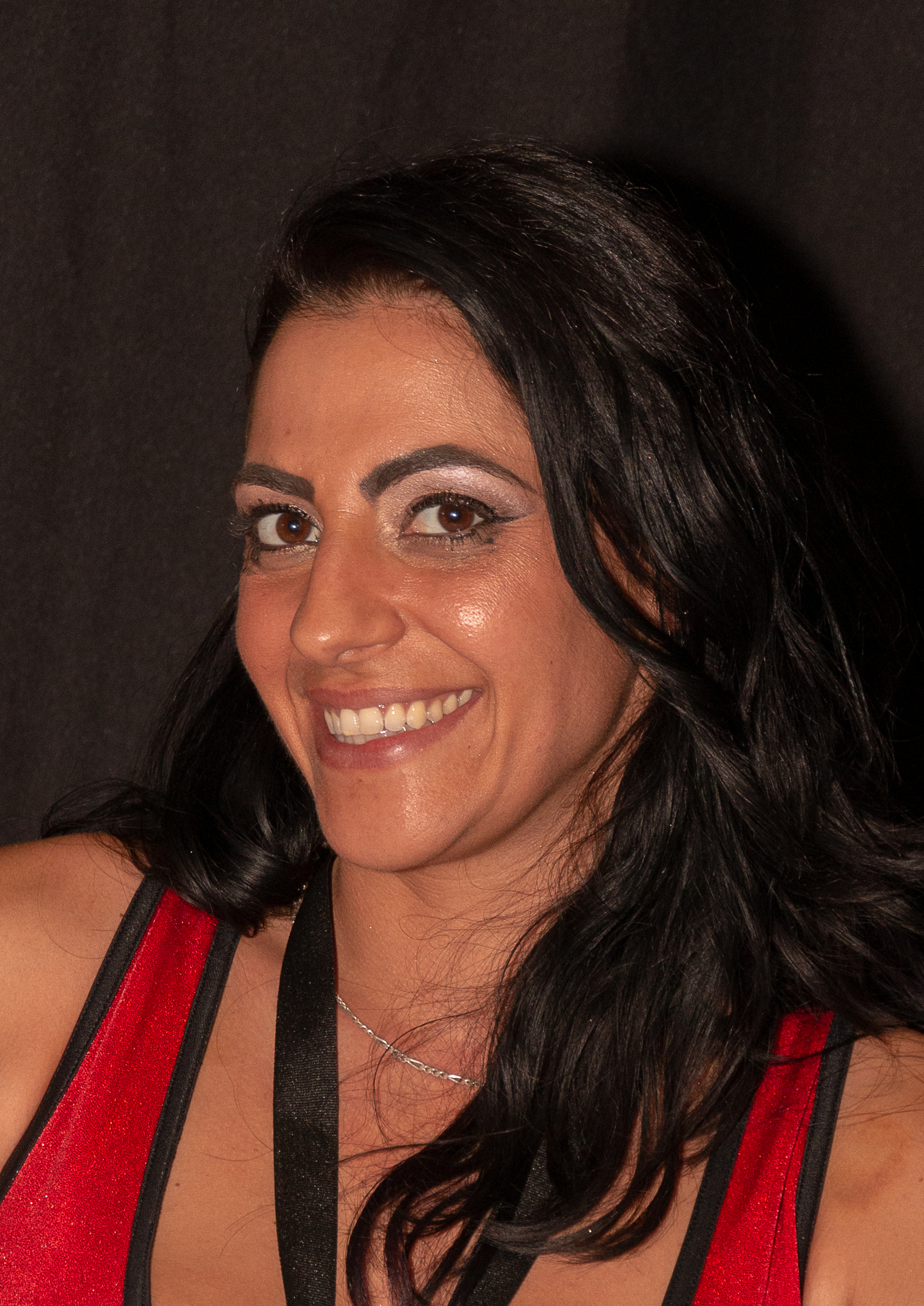
- Spinelli in 2018.
- Birth name: Natalie Rose Harrison
- Born: July 1, 1985 (age 40) Toronto, Ontario, Canada

Professional wrestling career
- Ring name(s): Kc Spinelli; Traci Spinelli; Undead Maid of Honor
- Billed height: 5 ft 4 in (163 cm)
- Billed weight: 163 lb (74 kg)
- Trained by: Artemis Spencer; Kenny Lush; Lance Storm; Nelson Creed; Nicole Matthews; Scotty Mac
- Debut: April 18, 2009

Natalie Rose Harrison (born July 1, 1985) is a Canadian professional wrestler, better known by her ring name Kc Spinelli.

== Early life ==
Harrison was born in Toronto, Ontario and grew up in Guelph, Ontario. She attended College Heights Secondary School in Guelph. A self-described tomboy, she took part in a diverse range of athletic pursuits, including ballet, gymnastics, horseback riding, baseball, hockey, ringette, karate, judo, mai tai kickboxing, and wrestling. As a competitive amateur wrestler in high school she was good enough to have reached the Ontario Federation of School Athletic Associations championships if she hadn't fractured her elbow. She studied carpentry in college.

== Professional wrestling career ==
In 2009, Harrison began training in professional wrestling under the likes of Artemis Spencer, Kenny Lush, Bomber Nelson Creed, and Nicole Matthews. Her debut match took place that same year, where she teamed up with Veronika Vice against Nicole Matthews and Enid Erkhart. Her main show debut was in 2010 against Tenille Dashwood. She adopted the ring name "Kc Spinelli", derived from the character Ashley Spinelli from the television series Recess.

In 2011, Spinelli was selected to be a part of the World of Hurt television series, featuring Lance Storm as the show's lead trainer. Her success on the program earned her the opportunity to appear as one of the trainers on the show's second season, this time under the legendary Rowdy Roddy Piper.

Spinelli made her first appearance in Impact Wrestling on the November 2, 2017 show where she was shown as part of a tag team match with Sienna against Rosemary and Allie at a Border City Wrestling show. The following week, another match from Border City Wrestling was shown - this one between Spinelli and Allie. On November 30, she was part of a triple threat match with Laurel Van Ness and Madison Rayne as part of a tournament for the Impact Knockouts Championship where she was pinned following an Unprettier by Van Ness. In mid-2018, Harrison began portraying the Undead Maid of Honor, a member of Su Yung's Undead Bridesmaids entourage. This Character is distinct and has no kayfabe relation to Spinelli.

In 2020, Spinelli began training at the Flatbacks Wrestling school under the tutelage of Shawn Spears and Tyler Breeze.

In 2023, Spinelli participated in a competition held by the Quebec-based Wrestling Academy 2023, organized by Jacques Rougeau, where the grand prize was $10,000 and three months of training at the Nightmare Factory wrestling school in Georgia owned by Cody Rhodes and QT Marshall. She reached the finals of the competition which was a match with her and Kat Von Heez. After the match, she was asked if she was comfortable with splitting the prize money, but refused as she felt that splitting the prize money was unfair, as the male competitors did not have to do so. As a consequence, Von Heeze was declared the sole winner for the women.

== Personal life ==
Harrison has stated that she considers herself a feminist, stating in one interview "I'd burn a bra, if I didn't need it."

== Championships and accomplishments ==
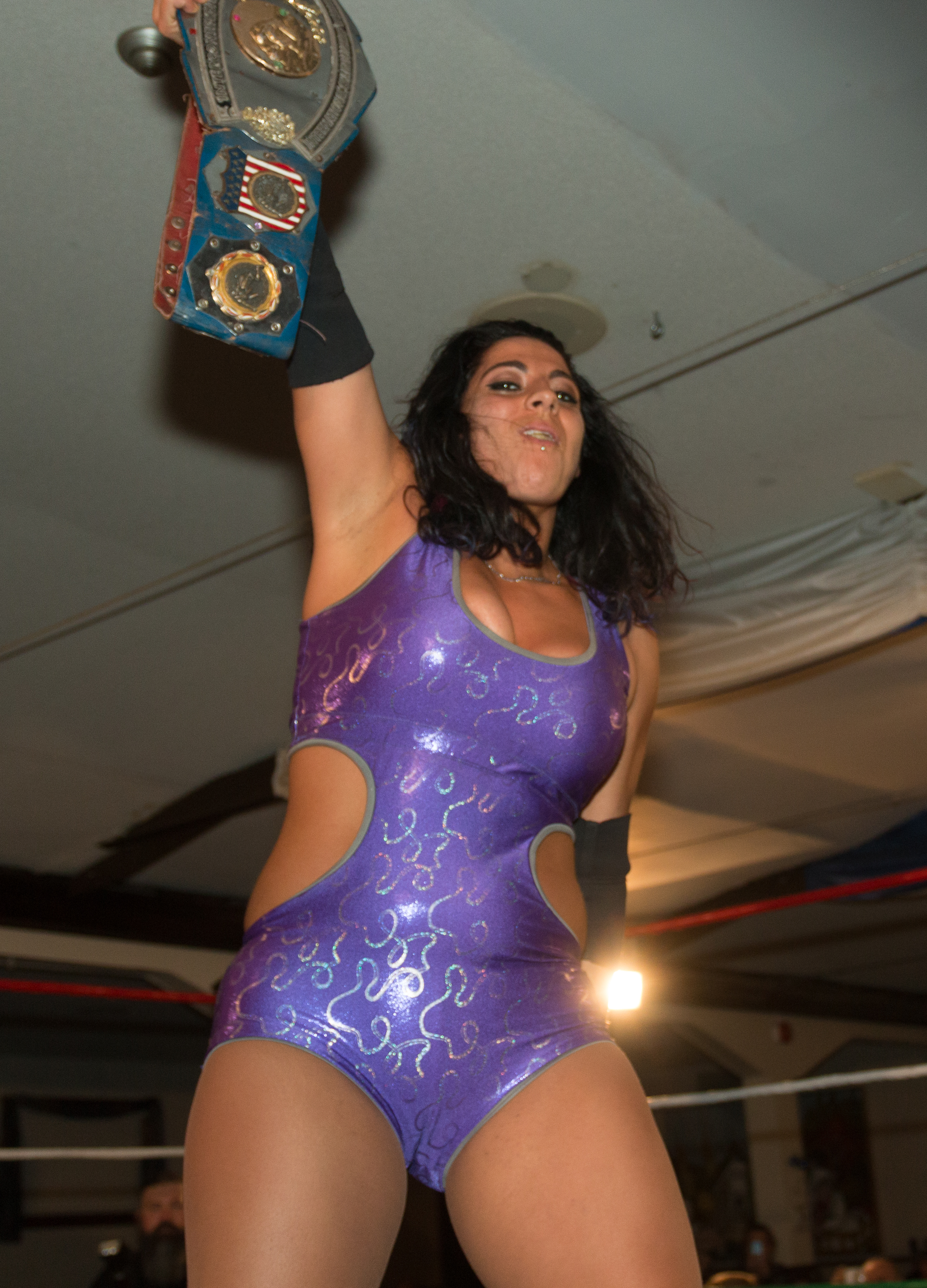
Spinelli posing with the PWA Elite Women's Championship in 2014.

- Acclaim Pro Wrestling
  - APW Women's Championship (1 time)
  - APW Tag Team Championship (1 time)
- British Empire Wrestling
  - BEW Women's Championship (1 time, current)
  - International Grand Prix (2018)
- Crossfire Wrestling
  - CW Women's Championship (1 time)
- Elite Canadian Championship Wrestling
  - ECCW Women's Championship (1 time)
- Pro Wrestling Illustrated
  - Ranked No. 45 of the best 50 female singles wrestlers in the PWI Female 50 in 2016
- Pure Wrestling Association
  - PWA Elite Women's Championship (1 time)
- Rebelution Women’s Wrestling
  - Rebelution World Championship (current)
- Steel City Pro Wrestling
  - SCPW Women's Championship (1 time)
- SMASH Wrestling
  - CANUSA Classic Gold Medallist** (with Team Canada) (1 time)
