= National Coalition of Abortion Providers =

The National Coalition of Abortion Providers (NCAP) was a trade association created to represent independent abortion providers in the United States. Founded in 1990, it was based in Washington, D.C.

== Leadership ==
From its inception in 1990 until early 2004, NCAP was led by its founding executive director, Ronald J. Fitzsimmons. After Fitzsimmons' departure, NCAP was led by President Jane Bovard (2004–2005), executive director Steven Emmert (2005–2007), and then by interim executive director Diana Philip. In 2008, NCAP dissolved and merged with the Abortion Conversation Project to form the Abortion Care Network.
