= ECCW Women's Championship =

Professional wrestling women's championship

Details
- Promotion: National Wrestling Alliance (NWA); Elite Canadian Championship Wrestling (ECCW)
- Date established: June 24, 2005
- Date retired: N/A N/A, 2020

Other names
- NWA SuperGirls Championship (2025); SuperGirls Championship (2005–???); ECCW Women's Championship (???–2020)
Statistics
- First champion: Rebecca Knox
- Final champion: Christina Von Eerie
- Most reigns: Nicole Matthews (5 reigns)
- Longest reign: Nicole Matthews (630 days)
- Shortest reign: Penni Lane (1 day)
- Oldest champion: Lisa Moretti (44 years, 145 days)
- Youngest champion: Rebecca Knox (18 years)

The ECCW Women's Championship (formerly the NWA SuperGirls Championship or SuperGirls Championship) is currently the women's professional wrestling championship of Elite Canadian Championship Wrestling, a wrestling promotion in British Columbia, Canada. The title was first awarded on June 24, 2005 in an attempt to generate interest for SuperGirls Wrestling, a women's wrestling spinoff of ECCW. Rebecca Knox became the first champion by defeating Miss Chevius. The title has been defended in several different promotions, including some promotions in Japan. During Nicole Matthews' near-year-long title reign in 2011, the title was renamed the ECCW Women's Championship.

== Title history ==
As of July 24, 2026.

Names	Years
NWA SuperGirls Championship	June 24, 2005
SuperGirls Championship	September 23, 2005
ECCW Women's Championship	N/A

Key
No.	Overall reign number
Reign	Reign number for the specific champion
Days	Number of days held
+	Current reign is changing daily

No.	Champion	Championship change			Reign statistics		Notes	Ref.
No.	Champion	Date	Event	Location	Reign	Days	Notes	Ref.
National Wrestling Alliance (NWA)
1	Rebecca Knox	June 24, 2005	Live event	Surrey, BC	1	301	Knox defeated Miss Chevius to determine the inaugural champion.	
2	Lisa Moretti	April 21, 2006	Live event	Surrey, BC	1	170		
3	Nattie Neidhart	October 8, 2006	N/A	Newark, CA	1	19		
4	Nikki Matthews	October 27, 2006	Live event	Surrey, BC	1	176	This was a three-way match, also involving Veronika Vice.	
5	Veronika Vice	April 21, 2007	Live event	Port Coquitlam, BC	1	314		
6	Penni Lane	February 29, 2008	Live event	Surrey, BC	1	1		
7	Nicole Matthews	March 1, 2008	Live event	Vancouver, BC	2	343	This was a street fight. Nicole Matthews is formerly known as Nikki Matthews.	
8	Veronika Vice	February 7, 2009	Live event	Vancouver, BC	2	175		
9	Tenille Tayla	August 1, 2009	Live event	Vancouver, BC	1	118	This was a three-way match, also involving Nicole Matthews.	
10	Veronika Vice	November 27, 2009	Live event	Surrey, BC	3	112		
11	Tenille Tayla	March 19, 2010	Quest for Gold	Surrey, BC	2	224		
12	Nicole Matthews	October 29, 2010	Halloween Hell	Surrey, BC	3	364	This was a tables match. Also during this reigns the title became property of ECCW.	
Extreme Canadian Championship Wrestling (ECCW) and Elite Canadian Championship Wrestling (ECCW)
13	K. C. Spinelli	October 28, 2011	Halloween Hell	Surrey, BC	1	512		
14	Nicole Matthews	March 23, 2013	We Will Riot	Port Coquitlam, BC	4	518		
—	Vacated	August 23, 2014	—	—	—	—	Matthews vacated the championship due to winning the ECCW Championship.	
15	Cat Power	January 3, 2015	Van-City Showdown	Vancouver, BC	1	190	Power defeated Kate Carney in a tournament final to win the vacant championship.	
16	Syuri	July 12, 2015	Live event	Kawasaki, Japan	1	231	The event was promoted by Reina Joshi Puroresu.	
17	Cat Power	February 28, 2016	Live event	Tokyo, Japan	2	503	The event was promoted by Reina Joshi Puroresu.	
18	Tony Baroni	July 15, 2017	Ballroom Brawl VIII	Vancouver, BC	1	98	Baroni is the first male wrestler to hold the title.	
19	Cat Power	October 21, 2017	Halloween Hell	New Westminster, BC	3	105		
20	Nicole Matthews	February 3, 2018	N/A	New Westminster, BC	5	630	This was a four-way match, also involving Bambi Hall and Liiza Hall.	
21	Bambi Hall	October 26, 2019	N/A	New Westminster, BC	1	84	This was a three-way match, also involving Riea Von Slasher.	
22	Christina Von Eerie	January 18, 2020	Ballroom Brawl 13 - Night 2	Vancouver, BC	1	N/A	This was a six-way TLC match, also involving Cat Power, Liiza Hall, Nicole Matthews and Riea Von Slasher.	
—	Deactivated	N/A N/A, 2020	—	—	—	—	The title became deactivated sometime in 2020 when the company defunct.	

== Combined reigns ==
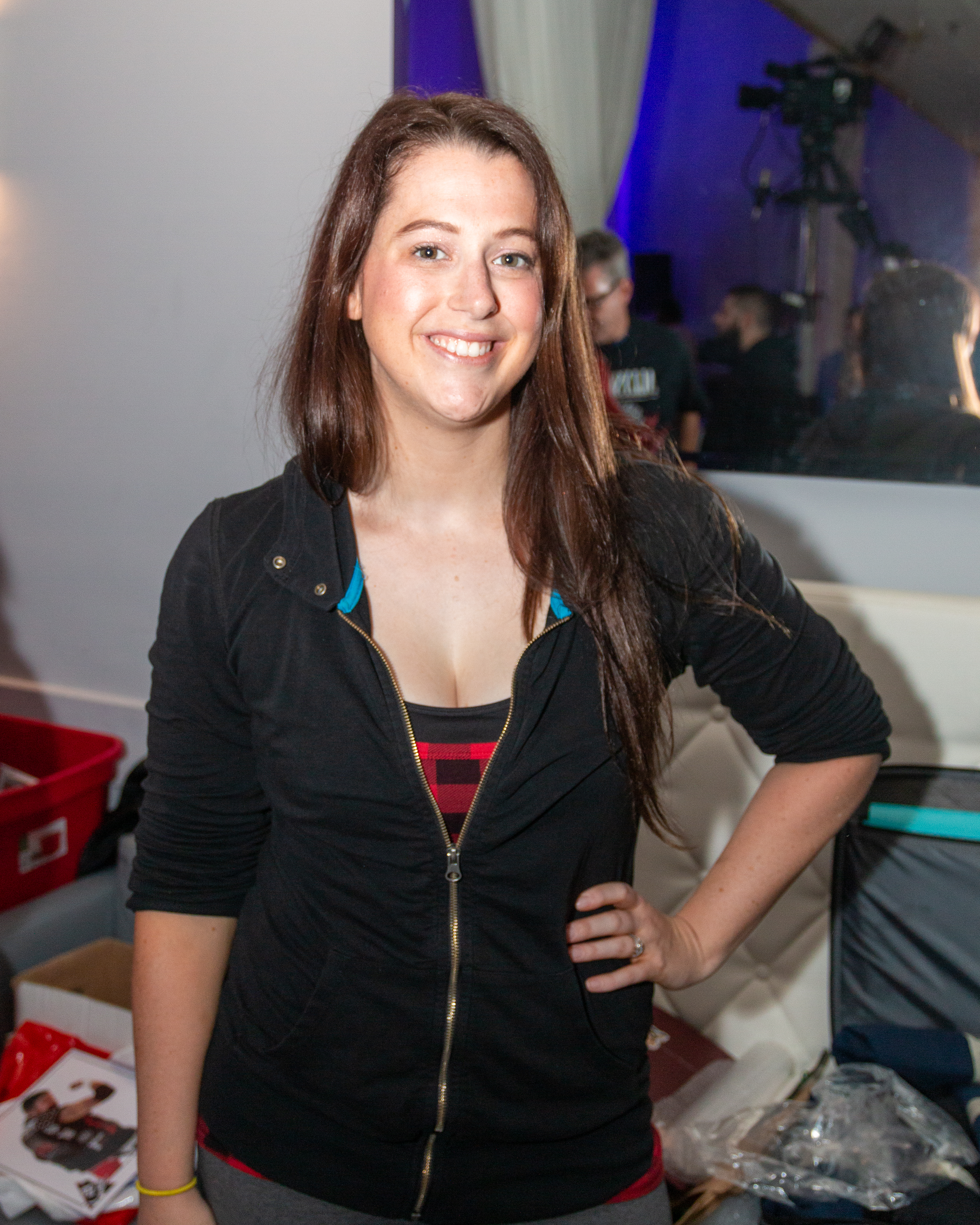
Nicole Matthews holds the record for most reigns with 5 and most combined days as champion with 2031

As of July 24, 2026.

†	Indicates the current champion

Rank	Wrestler	No. of reigns	Combined days
1	Nicole Matthews/Nikki Matthews	5	2,031
2	Christina Von Eerie	1	N/A
3	Cat Power	3	798
4	Veronika Vice	3	601
5	K. C. Spinelli	1	512
6	Tenille Tayla	2	342
7	Rebecca Knox	1	301
8	Syuri	1	231
9	Lisa Moretti	1	170
10	Tony Baroni	1	98
11	Bambi Hall	1	84
12	Nattie Neidhart	1	19
13	Penni Lane	1	1

== See also ==
- List of National Wrestling Alliance championships
- Elite Canadian Championship Wrestling
