= Catherine Power =

Canadian wrestler (born 1987)

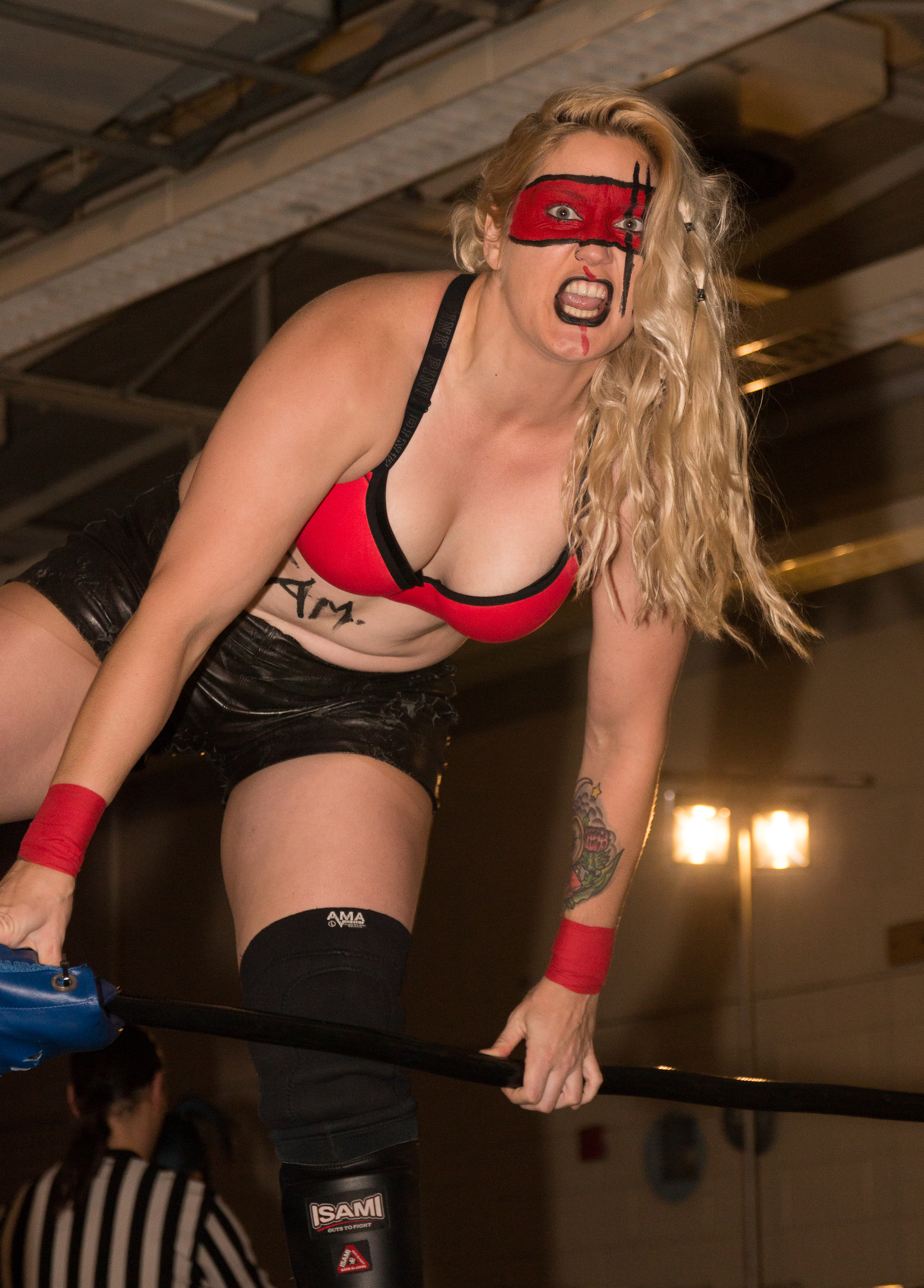
- Power making her ring entrance in 2016

Personal information
- Born: October 31, 1987 (age 38) North Sydney, Nova Scotia, Canada

Professional wrestling career
- Ring name: Cat Power
- Billed height: 5 ft 10 in (178 cm)
- Billed weight: 150 lb (68 kg)
- Billed from: Toronto, Ontario, Canada; Windsor, Ontario, Canada
- Trained by: Scott D'Amore; Johnny Devine
- Debut: July 2006

Catherine Power (born October 31, 1987) is a Canadian wrestler, better known by her ring name, Cat Power. She has worked for the promotions Blood Sweat and Ears, Border City Wrestling, and Elite Canadian Championship Wrestling.

== Professional wrestling career ==
=== Training and debut ===
Power decided to become a professional wrestler after attending WWE's WrestleMania 18 in 2002 in Toronto. After graduating from high school, Power felt pressured to attend college. She, however, left the University College of Cape Breton after her second year to attend the Can-Am Wrestling School in Windsor, Ontario in 2004. Her first match was with Blood Sweat and Ears in Toronto. In Ontario, she worked a series of matches with Jennifer Blake.

=== NCW Femmes Fatales (2010) ===
Power made her debut for NCW Femmes Fatales on their second show as a villain on February 6, 2010, where she defeated LuFisto by disqualification. Later in the night she attacked Cheerleader Melissa during her match with Kalamity, leading a match where LuFisto and Melissa defeated Power and Kalamity. She scored her first victory via pinfall on Volume 3, when she defeated Mistress Belmont. On Volume 4, Power lost to Courtney Rush in a triple threat match that included Sassy Stephie, and later attacked Rush after the match. She would lose again to Rush in a Street Fight at Volume 5, and the two competitors shook hands afterwards.

Power returned to NCW Femmes Fatales as a fan favorite at Volume 9, teaming with former rival Courtney Rush and Xandra Bale in a losing effort against the Midwest Militia (Jessicka Havok, Allysin Kay, and Sassy Stephie). Power took part in both parts of Volume 10, losing singles matches to Saraya Knight (Part 1) and Kellie Skater (Part 2).

=== Japan (2015–present) ===
On March 25, 2015, Power made her Japanese debut, teaming with Kana and Yuko Miyamoto in a six-person tag team match, where they were defeated by Hikaru Shida, Shiro Koshinaka and Zeus. During her time in Japan, Power lost her ECCW Women's Championship to Syuri on July 12. She regained the title from Syuri during another tour on February 28, 2016.

== Championships and accomplishments ==
- Elite Canadian Championship Wrestling
  - ECCW Women's Championship (3 times)
- Pro Wrestling Illustrated
  - Ranked No. 42 of the top 50 female wrestlers in the PWI Female 50 in 2010
- Pro Wrestling Xtreme
  - PWX Women's Championship (1 time)
