= Becky Lynch =

Irish professional wrestler (born 1987)

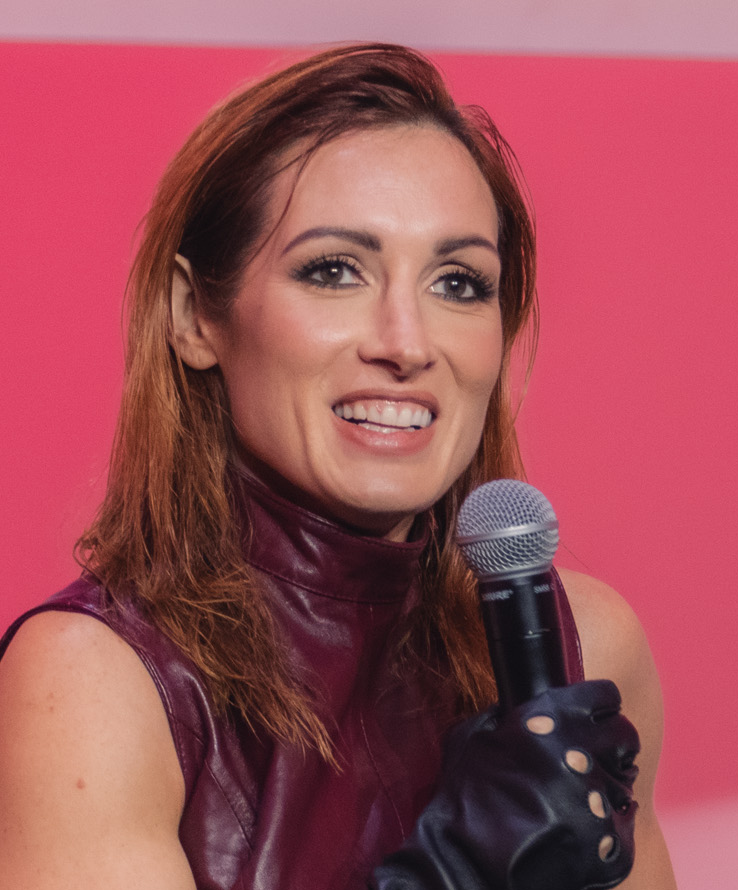
- Lynch in 2024
- Born: Rebecca Quin; 30 January 1987 (age 39); Limerick, Ireland
- Citizenship: Ireland; United States (since 2024)
- Education: Dublin Institute of Technology (BA)
- Occupations: Professional wrestler; actress; writer
- Years active: 2002–present
- Spouse: Seth Rollins (m. 2021)
- Children: 1
- Professional wrestling career
- Ring name(s): Becky Lynch; La Luchadora; Rebecca Knox; Komeera
- Billed height: 5 ft 6 in (168 cm)
- Billed weight: 135 lb (61 kg)
- Billed from: Dublin, Ireland
- Trained by: Finn Bálor; Paul Tracey; NWA UK Hammerlock
- Debut: 11 November 2002

Rebecca Quin (born 30 January 1987), better known by the ring name Becky Lynch, is an Irish professional wrestler. She has been signed to WWE since April 2013, where she performs on the Raw brand.

Quin began training as a professional wrestler in 2002. Initially working in Ireland, and occasionally teaming with her brother using the ring name Rebecca Knox, she soon began wrestling across Europe and North America on the independent circuit for various promotions. She most notably competed in Elite Canadian Championship Wrestling and became the inaugural SuperGirls Champion in 2005. In 2006, Quin had a severe head injury during a match which kept her away from wrestling for several years. She returned in 2012 and signed a contract with WWE in 2013, assigned to the developmental territory at NXT. Following her push to WWE's main roster, she became the inaugural SmackDown Women's Champion at Backlash 2016 and has held the title five times.

In 2018, Lynch transitioned to a more aggressive character starting at SummerSlam, when she attacked Charlotte Flair, presenting herself as an unfairly treated underdog and dubbing herself "The Man", resulting in a large increase in her popularity. In 2019, she won the Royal Rumble match, and in the main event of WrestleMania 35 won both the Raw Women's Championship and SmackDown Women's Championship, making her the first woman to hold both titles simultaneously and a four-time WWE women's champion. This was also the first time that a women's match was the main event of a WrestleMania, which was also subsequently the final one-night WrestleMania as it expanded to two nights the following year. She stands as one of only five women to have headlined WWE's marquee event.

After going on maternity leave in May 2020, she returned in August 2021 at SummerSlam to confront SmackDown Women's Champion Bianca Belair, whom she would defeat seconds later to become a four-time SmackDown Women's Champion. With her WWE Women's Tag Team Championship win in early 2023, she became WWE's Sixth Women's Triple Crown Champion, and then after winning the NXT Women's Championship in September 2023, she became WWE's sixth Women's Grand Slam Champion. In 2025, she won the WWE Women's Intercontinental Championship and went on to set the record for the longest reign at 163 days. In 2026, she became a record three-time WWE Women's Intercontinental Champion.

== Early life ==
Rebecca Quin was born in Limerick on 30 January 1987. Shortly after her birth, her family moved back to Dublin. Her parents separated when she was one year old, and her father moved out, but her mother invited him back to co-parent when Rebecca was four. When she was 11, her mother found a new partner, a pilot, and she and Rebecca moved to the coastal suburb of Bayside, to a house beside that of her partner, two years later. Rebecca in her autobiography goes into some detail on completing her growing years there.

She started watching professional wrestling from a young age with her brother, Richy, who later wrestled under the ring name Gonzo de Mondo. She was involved in horse riding, swimming, and basketball. However, she went through a difficult teenage period, with problems with schoolwork, even failing Physical education (P.E.) one year.

While at Mount Temple Comprehensive School she considered a career in acting, but was dissuaded by an aunt who was an actor. Quin attended University College Dublin to study philosophy, history and politics, but said she 'really hated it' and dropped out. She planned to return to college to study health and exercise studies. Prior to beginning to train as a wrestler, she stated that she had been 'going down a bad path' involving alcohol, but wrestling helped her give it up.

== Professional wrestling career ==
=== Training and early career (2002–2005) ===
As a teenager, Quin heard that Fergal Devitt and Paul Tracey were opening a wrestling school in Ireland. She began training there along with her brother in June 2002. She made her professional wrestling debut five months later on 11 November, using the ring name Rebecca Knox. She teamed with her brother in mixed tag team matches during the early part of her career. She also trained at British professional wrestling promotion NWA UK Hammerlock.

=== Independent circuit (2005–2013) ===
Knox joined the Canadian promotion SuperGirls Wrestling, an all-female offshoot of Extreme Canadian Championship Wrestling (ECCW) in May 2005. Following her arrival at an ECCW show in Surrey, British Columbia, Knox feuded with Miss Chevius and defeated her, but lost to her in Port Coquitlam a month later. The following night, Knox teamed with Calum Macbeth to defeat Miss Chevius and Tony Tisoy in a mixed tag team match in Vancouver. On 24 June, Knox defeated Miss Chevius at an ECCW show in Surrey to become the inaugural SuperGirls Champion. Knox successfully defended the championship on several occasions before eventually losing it to Lisa Moretti in April 2006.

In late 2005, Knox participated in All Pro Wrestling (APW)'s third ChickFight tournament in Hayward, California; she defeated Morgan in the first round, but was eliminated by eventual winner Mariko Yoshida. Knox then won an eighteen-person battle royal at an event in Tokyo, Japan.

Knox began working for the all-female promotion Shimmer Women Athletes in early 2006. In her debut match for the promotion, she defeated Allison Danger, and established herself as a heel (villain) by faking an injury. Following that, she began feuding with Daizee Haze; Knox lost the first match between them, but won the rematch of two-out-of-three falls.

In June 2006, Knox defeated Sweet Saraya to win the vacated World Queens of Chaos Championship at an event in Chouilly, France. She held the championship for few months before dropping it to Saraya in September.

In September 2006, while wrestling in Germany, Knox sustained a legit head injury, following which she claimed to have been "suffering from extremely painful headaches, loud buzzing in her left ear and vision as a result," and was also diagnosed with possible damage to her eighth cranial nerve. A 60-minute Iron Woman match against Haze at Shimmer's Volume 7 taping was cancelled as a result.

Following her injury, Quin took a six-year hiatus, wrestling only on three occasions for Irish promotion Fight Factory Pro Wrestling (FFPW) in 2008, 2012 and 2013. She also reappeared in Shimmer in 2011, managing Saraya and Britani Knight for four shows.

=== WWE ===
==== NXT (2013–2015) ====
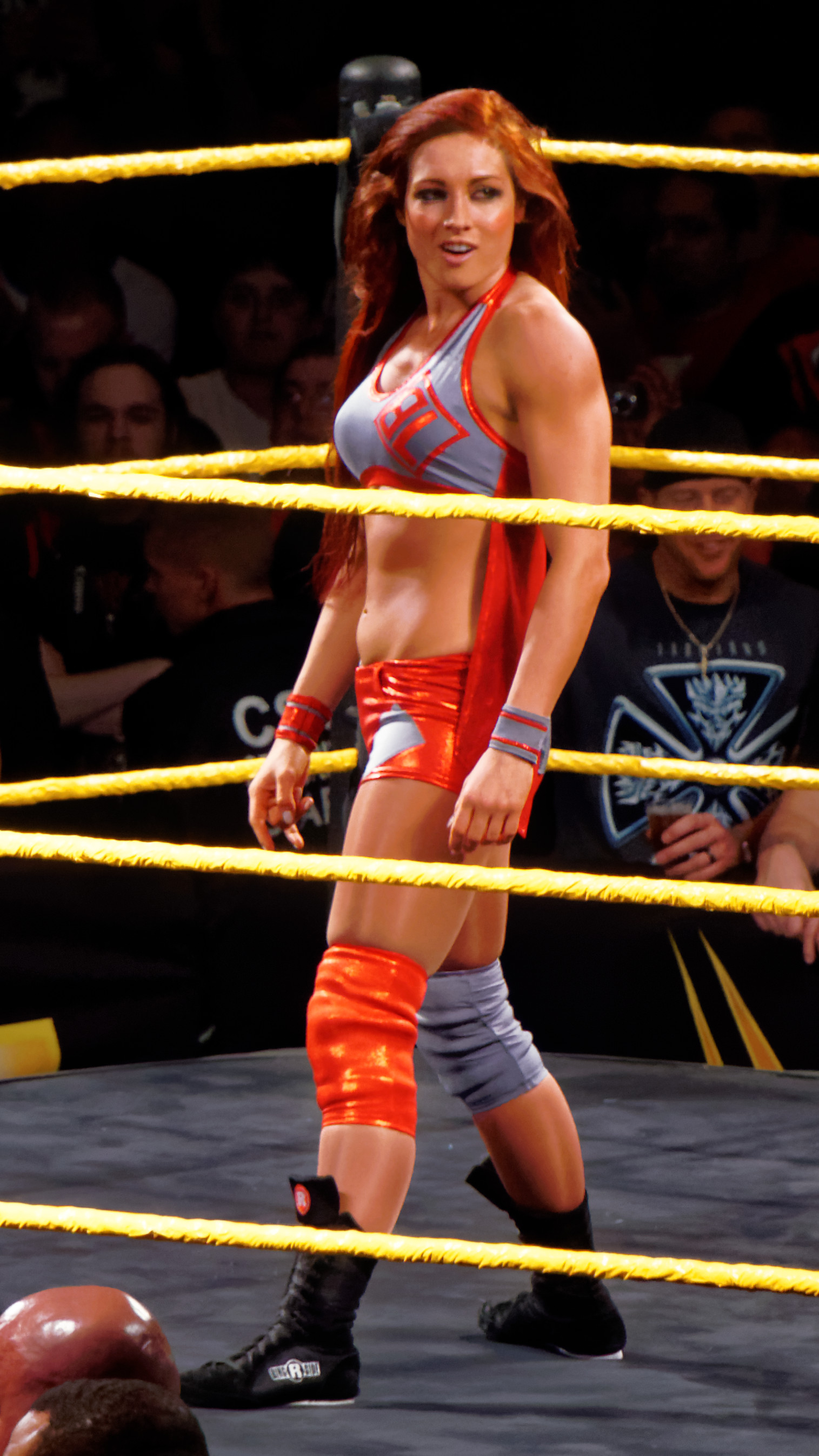
Lynch during an NXT house show in March 2015

In April 2013, Quin signed a two-year developmental deal with World Wrestling Entertainment (WWE) and moved to Florida to report to their developmental territory NXT. On 29 August, her new ring name was revealed as Becky Lynch.

Lynch made her televised in-ring debut on 26 June 2014 episode of NXT, defeating Summer Rae. The next week, Lynch teamed up with Bayley in a losing effort to the BFFs: Beautiful Fierce Females (NXT Women's Champion Charlotte and Sasha Banks) in a tag-team match. Lynch spent the next few months competing in non-title matches against Charlotte, losing three in a row. On 23 October episode of NXT, after being told to make herself relevant, Lynch aligned herself with Banks by attacking Bayley, turning heel. Known as Team B.A.E. (Best at Everything), the alliance started to disintegrate when Banks cost Lynch a match against Bayley in February 2015.

At NXT TakeOver: Rival, Lynch participated in a fatal four-way match for the NXT Women's Championship, which was won by Banks. In April, Lynch defeated Bayley and Charlotte in a triple threat match to earn a title match against Sasha, which she lost at NXT TakeOver: Unstoppable. During the match, she debuted a new look resembling Magic: The Gathering character Chandra Nalaar. The match received widespread critical acclaim, with praise going to both performers.

==== Women's Revolution (2015–2016) ====
Lynch made her official main roster debut on 13 July episode of Raw, as a fan favourite, along with Charlotte and Sasha Banks, after Stephanie McMahon called for a "revolution" in the WWE Divas division. Lynch and Charlotte began allying with Paige, who was feuding with Team Bella (Alicia Fox and The Bella Twins), while Banks allied with Naomi and Tamina, leading to a brawl between the three teams. The trio of Paige, Lynch and Charlotte, originally dubbed Submission Sorority, was renamed to Team PCB (after the initials of each wrestler) when it was found out the original name was the same as an adult web page. Lynch made her in-ring debut on 20 July episode of Raw, teaming with Paige in a losing effort against Sasha Banks and Naomi. She earned her first singles victory on 28 July episode of Main Event over Brie Bella. The three teams ultimately faced off at SummerSlam in a three-team elimination match, in which Lynch pinned Brie Bella to win the match for PCB.

On 31 August episode of Raw, all members of PCB competed in the inaugural "Divas Beat the Clock Challenge", to determine the number one contender for the Divas Championship. Charlotte won the match and went on to claim the title from Nikki Bella at Night of Champions on 20 September. The following night on Raw, Paige turned on her partners during Charlotte's celebration, claiming that Charlotte was only there because of her father Ric Flair (since he was a former wrestler in WWE) and called Lynch the "least relevant" member of the group. Throughout October, Paige tried to reconcile with Lynch and Charlotte only to attack them, officially disbanding Team PCB in the process. On 2 November episode of Raw, Lynch was pinned by Paige in a fatal four-way to earn a title match for Charlotte's Divas Championship. The following week on Raw, Lynch gained revenge by defeating Paige.

"Lynch is the one who was the key to the initially failing "Divas Revolution" turning around. Her program with Charlotte may have been the best booked on the main roster. And it worked".

— Dave Meltzer in February 2016

On 30 November episode of Raw, Charlotte started displaying villainous traits after she feigned a leg injury to defeat Lynch, followed by a distraction provided by her father. Throughout December, the two's friendship continued to strain and after Lynch defeated her on 4 January 2016 episode of Raw, Charlotte attacked her and solidified her heel turn. Lynch faced Charlotte for the Divas Championship three days later on SmackDown and at the Royal Rumble pay-per-view event, but lost both matches after interference from Ric Flair.

Throughout February, Lynch began teaming with Banks against Naomi and Tamina. Their feud continued until Lynch and Banks came victorious in a tag team match at Fastlane. The following night on Raw, a number one contender's match for the Divas Championship between Lynch and Banks ended in a double pin (both wrestlers pinning each other simultaneously). A rematch on the following SmackDown ended in a no contest when Diva's Champion Charlotte attacked both contestants. As a result, Charlotte was scheduled to defend her title in a triple threat against both wrestlers at WrestleMania 32. At the event, Lynch failed to win the newly created WWE Women's Championship (which replaced the Diva's Championship). At Money in the Bank in June, Lynch teamed up with Natalya to face Dana Brooke and Charlotte in a losing effort. After their match, Natalya turned on Lynch and attacked her. The two began feuding for a month until Lynch lost to Natalya at Battleground.

==== SmackDown Women's Champion (2016–2018) ====
After being the first woman drafted to the SmackDown brand during the 2016 WWE draft, Lynch defeated Natalya in her first match as part of the brand. At SummerSlam, Lynch teamed up with Carmella and Naomi in a six–woman tag team match in a losing effort against Alexa Bliss, Natalya and Nikki Bella.

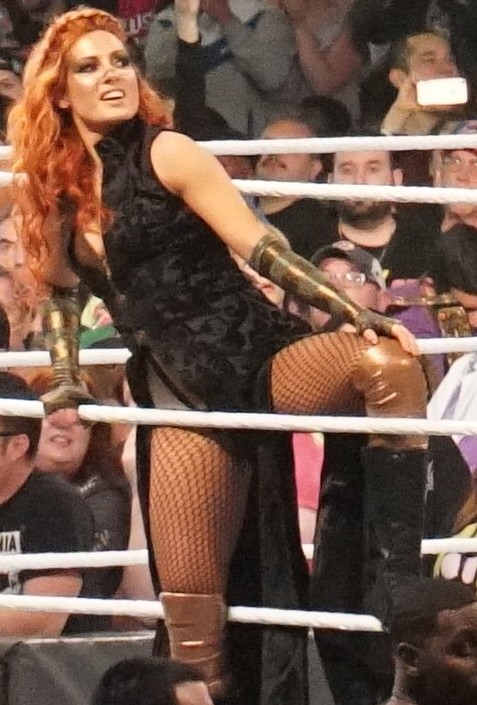
Lynch at WrestleMania 34 in April 2018

On 11 September, at Backlash, Lynch won a six-pack elimination challenge, last eliminating Carmella, to become the inaugural SmackDown Women's Champion. Her first title defence against Alexa Bliss was scheduled for No Mercy but due to Lynch experiencing a legitimate injury the match was postponed to 8 November episode of SmackDown, where Lynch retained. At Survivor Series later that month, Lynch made up part of Team SmackDown alongside Bliss, Carmella, Naomi and Natalya in a Survivor Series match in a losing effort to Team Raw. At the TLC: Tables, Ladders & Chairs pay-per-view in December, Lynch lost the SmackDown Women's Championship to Bliss in a tables match, ending her reign at 84 days. She received her championship rematch on 17 January 2017 episode of SmackDown, in a steel cage match but lost after interference from another La Luchadora (later revealed as the returning Mickie James). This led to a match between Lynch and James at Elimination Chamber in February, which Lynch won. Lynch participated in a six-pack challenge for the title at WrestleMania 33 in April, which was ultimately won by Naomi.

In May, Lynch aligned with Naomi and Charlotte Flair against The Welcoming Committee (Natalya, Carmella and Tamina). The two teams faced off in a six-woman tag team match at Backlash; the Welcoming Committee was victorious when Lynch submitted to Natalya's sharpshooter. Shortly after, Lynch competed at Money in the Bank, as part of the first women's money in the bank ladder match, which was won by Carmella. In October, Lynch won a fatal five-way match against Flair, Naomi, Tamina and Carmella to become the Team SmackDown's captain for Survivor Series. At the event, Lynch was the first competitor eliminated and her team was on the losing side. Throughout the rest of the year, Lynch again aligned with Flair and Naomi to feud with the debuting Riott Squad (Ruby Riott, Liv Morgan and Sarah Logan). In January 2018, at the Royal Rumble, Lynch participated in the first women's Royal Rumble match, entering at number 2 and lasting over 30 minutes before being eliminated by Ruby Riott. A few months later, Lynch also participated in the WrestleMania Women's Battle Royal at WrestleMania 34, but was eliminated from the match by James. In May, she qualified for the women's Money in the Bank ladder match, which was ultimately won by Alexa Bliss.

==== The Man (2018–2019) ====
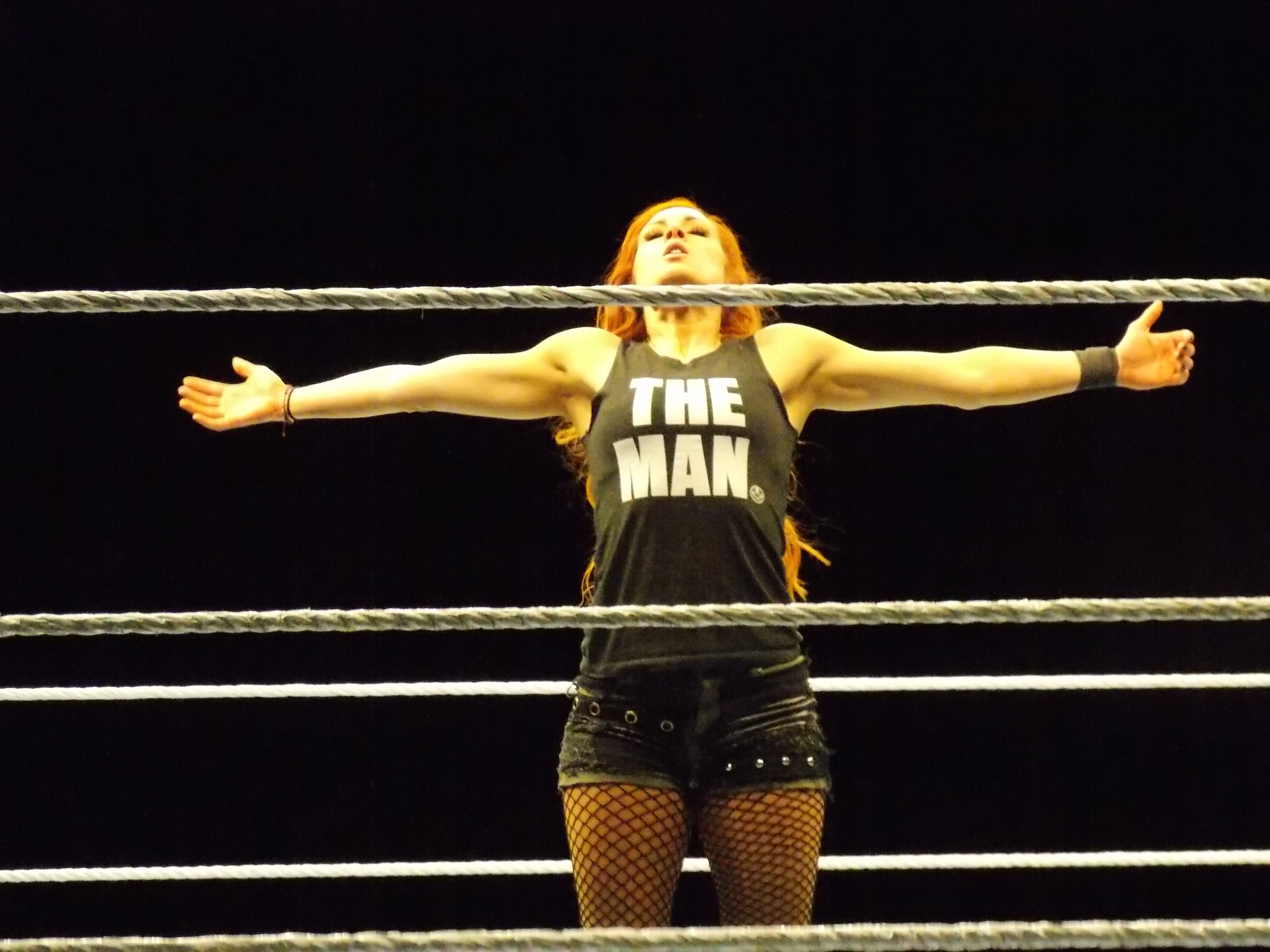
In 2018, Lynch started using the nickname "The Man".

Following the 2018 Money in the Bank event, Lynch began a winning streak, defeating different competitors such as Billie Kay, Sonya Deville, Peyton Royce, Mandy Rose, and SmackDown Women's Champion Carmella in a non-title match. The wins earned Lynch a title match at SummerSlam, with Charlotte Flair being added to the match as well after she also defeated Carmella in a non-title match. Flair went on to win the title by pinning Lynch, who was about to submit Carmella. After the match, Lynch attacked Flair, turning heel for the first time on the main roster. Two days later on SmackDown, Lynch berated the crowd, claiming that they were not really supporting her the whole time, and that she was being denied opportunities which were always handed to Flair. Despite this, audiences increasingly supported Lynch, leading WWE to tweak the storyline and portray both Lynch and Flair as both having valid points, but neither being outright heels. The feud between the two led to a title match at Hell in a Cell, in which Lynch won the SmackDown Women's Championship for a second time. Lynch subsequently retained her title against Flair at both Super Show-Down and Evolution.

Around this time, Lynch started using the nickname "The Man", claiming to be the top wrestler of the company, and was depicted as a face once again. As part of a competition between the Raw and SmackDown brands at Survivor Series, Lynch was scheduled for an interbrand champion vs. champion match against Raw Women's Champion Ronda Rousey. Lynch led an invasion of the Raw roster on 12 November episode of Raw, where she had a legit concussion and broken nose following a punch from Nia Jax; despite the injury, her seemingly unfazed reaction and images of her bloody face turned her into an overnight star – she'd later call the accident "a blessing in disguise". Due to the injury, Lynch was pulled from the match with Rousey and named Flair as her replacement on the following night's episode of SmackDown. After her return, Lynch defended her title at TLC in December against both Flair and Asuka in a Tables, Ladders and Chairs match, in which Asuka won the title after Rousey interfered and pushed both Lynch and Flair off a ladder, ending her second reign at 91 days. On 27 January 2019, at the Royal Rumble event, Lynch failed to regain the title from Asuka. Later that night, she participated in the women's Royal Rumble match, replacing an injured Lana, who was the 28th entrant. Lynch would go on to win with lastly eliminating Charlotte Flair. The following night on Raw, Lynch continued her feud with Ronda Rousey, choosing to face Rousey for the Raw Women's Championship at WrestleMania 35. As part of a storyline in which she refused to seek medical attention on her knee and attacked Stephanie McMahon and Triple H, Vince McMahon suspended Lynch in February for 60 days and replaced her with Charlotte Flair as Rousey's WrestleMania opponent. Due to pleadings from Rousey, Lynch was reinstated by Stephanie, and at the Fastlane event, she defeated Flair via disqualification after Rousey purposely attacked Lynch to give her the win; due to the stipulation of the match, Lynch was added back into the title match at WrestleMania to make it a triple-threat match for the Raw Women's Championship.

Flair then won the SmackDown Women's Championship from Asuka, making the WrestleMania match a Winner Takes All match for both titles. At the event, in what was the first time women main evented a WrestleMania, Lynch controversially pinned Rousey to win both titles. The commentary and production team commented that Rousey's shoulders were not down for the three-count and many fans and media were left wondering if this was a legitimate botched finish. Nonetheless, with the win, Lynch gave Rousey her first WWE singles and pinfall loss and became a double champion and the only woman to hold both titles simultaneously. With both titles, she was allowed to appear on both the Raw and SmackDown brands and got another nickname, "Becky Two Belts".

==== Record-breaking Raw Women's Champion (2019–2020) ====
Shortly after WrestleMania, Lynch was placed in a feud with newcomer Lacey Evans, who was drafted to Raw during the Superstar Shake-up and who continuously attacked Lynch after her promos. Simultaneously on SmackDown, Lynch continued her feud with Flair over the SmackDown Women's Championship. In May, at Money in the Bank, Lynch retained the Raw Women's Championship over Evans, but lost the SmackDown Women's Championship to Charlotte Flair in the following match due to an interference by Evans. After she lost the SmackDown Women's Championship, Lynch became an exclusive member of the Raw brand and continued her feud with Evans. In mid-June, Lynch successfully retained her title over Evans at the Stomping Grounds pay-per-view. Later that night, Lynch helped her real-life boyfriend Seth Rollins retain the WWE Universal Championship over Baron Corbin, after Corbin chose Evans as the special guest referee for their title match. The two feuds between the two pairs came to an end at the Extreme Rules event in July, after Lynch and Rollins retained both of their titles in a winners take all mixed tag team match.

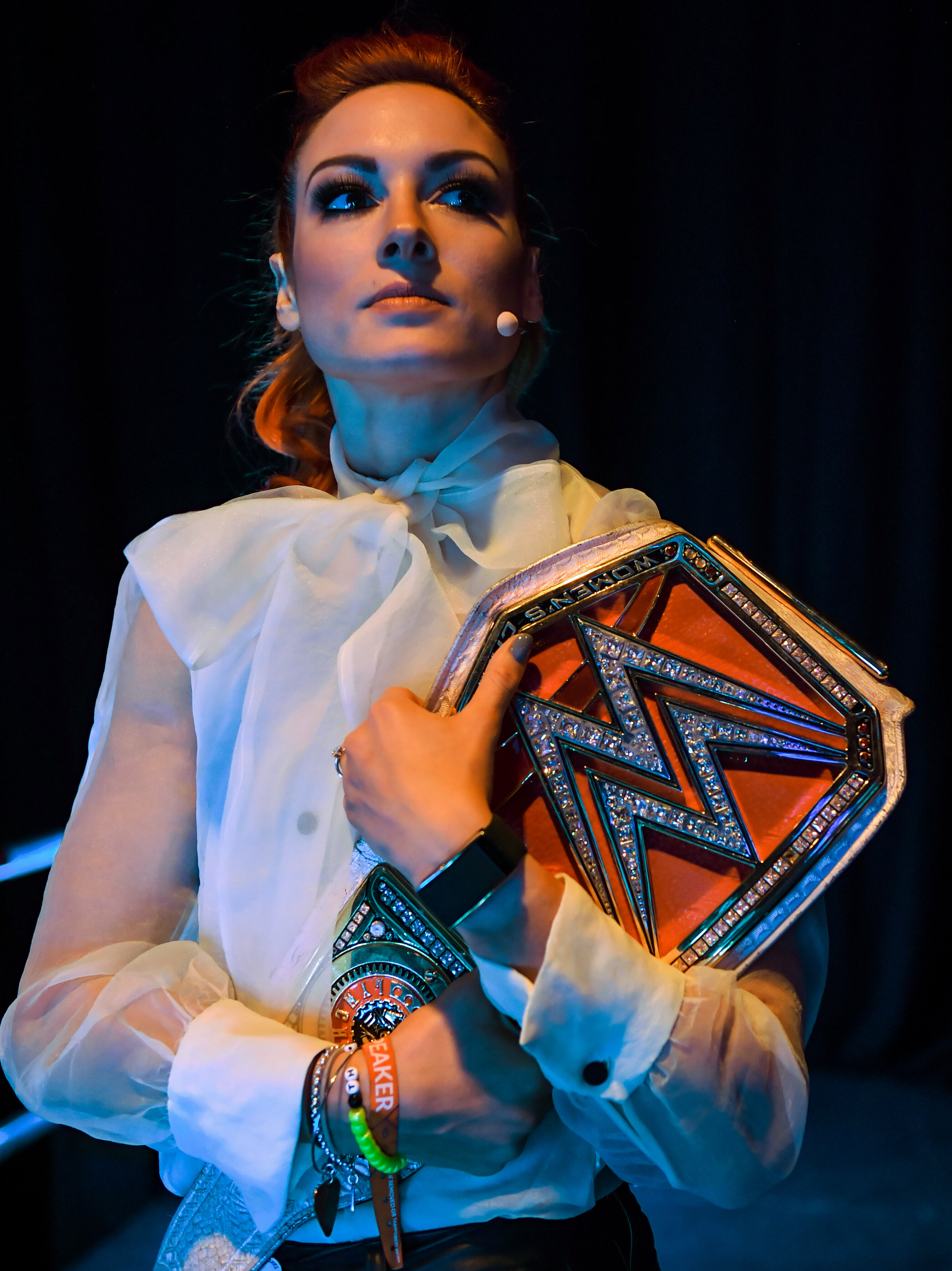
Lynch as Raw Women's Champion in November 2019

In August, Lynch started a short feud with Natalya. At SummerSlam, Lynch was victorious in a submission match between the two. Upon her return in mid-August, Sasha Banks attacked Lynch and reignited their feud from 2015. At Clash of Champions, on 15 September, Lynch retained her title after inadvertently hitting the referee with a chair, causing a disqualification loss. The feud eventually led to a Hell in a Cell match on 6 October at the namesake pay-per-view. Lynch was victorious once again. At Survivor Series, Lynch faced SmackDown Women's Champion Bayley and NXT Women's Champion Shayna Baszler in a non-title triple threat match to determine the superior women's champion. Baszler emerged victorious by submitting Bayley while Lynch was downed at ringside. Following the match, Lynch attacked Baszler and put her through an announce table. On 26 November, Lynch surpassed Ronda Rousey as the longest-reigning Raw Women's Champion.

Following Survivor Series, Lynch allied herself with Charlotte in a rivalry with Women's Tag Team Champions The Kabuki Warriors (Asuka and Kairi Sane), leading to a Tables, Ladders and Chairs match for the championship between the two teams being arranged for TLC in December, which The Kabuki Warriors won. She then continued her feud with Asuka, which directed to a match for the Raw Women's Championship at the Royal Rumble on 26 January 2020, where Lynch retained to end the feud.

In February, Lynch feuded with Shayna Baszler, who won an Elimination Chamber match to challenge Lynch for the championship at WrestleMania 36. At the event on 4 April, Lynch defeated Baszler to retain the title, with her title reign surpassing the one-year mark shortly after. Following the event, Lynch ceased participating in physical confrontations, often relying on promos to advance her storylines. On 11 May episode of Raw, Lynch announced that she was relinquishing the Raw Women's Championship due to her real-life pregnancy, and that the previous night's Women's Money in the Bank ladder match – which was won by Asuka – was actually for the championship.

==== Big Time Becks (2021–2022) ====
On 21 August 2021, following a 15-month hiatus, Lynch made her return at SummerSlam with a heel character, defeating Bianca Belair in less than half a minute to win the SmackDown Women's Championship for the fourth time. At Extreme Rules, Lynch successfully retained her title following interference by a returning Sasha Banks. A triple threat match between the three women for the SmackDown Women's Championship was then scheduled for the Crown Jewel event in October, where Lynch successfully retained her title. On 15 October episode of SmackDown, as part of her feud with Banks and Belair, Lynch would go one-on-one with Banks and Banks would pin her with a Backstabber after interference from Belair, marking her first loss since her return.

As a part of the 2021 Draft, Lynch was drafted to the Raw brand as a SmackDown Women's Champion. On 22 October episode of SmackDown, Lynch and Raw Women's Champion Charlotte Flair exchanged their titles, thus Lynch became the new Raw Women's Champion. As part of the 2021 Draft, Bianca Belair was also drafted to Raw and continued her feud with Lynch. On 1 November episode of Raw, Lynch successfully defended her title against Belair, ending the feud. At Survivor Series, Lynch defeated SmackDown Women's Champion Charlotte Flair in a Champion vs. Champion match. Lynch went on to defeat Liv Morgan to retain the title on 6 December episode of Raw, and in a rematch at Day 1. On 31 January 2022 episode of Raw, Lynch would confront Royal Rumble winner Ronda Rousey but was dropped by Rousey as she left the ring. She would then be confronted by Lita and she would challenge Lynch to a title match at Elimination Chamber for the Raw Women's Championship and she would accept, with this being a dream match for Lynch as well as a first time ever match. She was successful in retaining her title, which would set up a title match with the winner of the Elimination Chamber number one contenders match, Bianca Belair, at WrestleMania 38. At night one of the event, Becky Lynch lost her title to Belair, ending her reign at 162 days.

On 25 April episode of Raw, Lynch was confronted by a returning Asuka, reigniting their feud. On 16 May episode of Raw, Lynch failed to become the #1 contender for the Raw Women's Championship by losing to Asuka. The next week, Lynch defeated Asuka to get added to the match between her and Belair at Hell in a Cell, making it a triple threat match. At the event, Belair retained her title. On 20 June episode of Raw, Lynch failed to qualify for the Women's Money in the Bank ladder match after losing to Asuka. However, Lynch was headed to the event after winning a last chance MITB qualifying six pack elimination match on the following episode of Raw. At Money in the Bank, she was unsuccessful in winning the match. At SummerSlam, Lynch failed to regain the Raw Women's Championship from Belair, but embraced her after the match, turning face in the process. After Belair was confronted by a returning Bayley and new allies Dakota Kai and Iyo Sky (formerly Io Shirai), Lynch aided Belair, cementing her face turn. On 1 August, WWE issued a statement regarding Lynch suffering a separated shoulder in her match at SummerSlam, where she was expected to be out of action for several months. On that night's episode of Raw, she was attacked backstage by Bayley, Kai, and Sky, effectively being written off of television.

==== Return of The Man (2022–2024) ====
On 25 November episode of SmackDown, Lynch made her return as "The Man", being revealed as the fifth and final member of Bianca Belair's team for Survivor Series: WarGames. At the event on 26 November, Lynch's team was victorious after Lynch performed a Double Diving Leg Drop from the top of the cage on Kai and Sky through a table and pinned Kai to win the match.

On 27 February episode of Raw, Lynch and Lita defeated Damage CTRL to win the WWE Women's Tag Team Championship with the help of returning Trish Stratus; Lynch also became the Sixth Women's Triple Crown Champion. At Night 1 of WrestleMania 39, Lynch, Lita, and Stratus defeated Damage CTRL. On 10 April episode of Raw, she and Stratus (replacing an injured Lita) dropped the titles to Liv Morgan and Raquel Rodriguez, ending Lynch and Lita's reign at 41 days. Stratus then turned on Lynch and both started a feud. While Lynch lost to Stratus at Night of Champions, Their second match on 14 August episode of Raw ended in a double countout. Their rematch was scheduled for Payback. Lynch defeated Stratus at Payback in a steel cage ending their feud. The match not being included on the card for SummerSlam (an event between Night of Champions and Payback) received backlash from fans on social media, with reports suggesting that both Stratus and Lynch had real-life frustrations with the decision. Further reports claimed that the match was not included due to time constraints, which was seemingly confirmed by Triple H, who defending the decision by stating: "There was a lot of banter I saw this week about matches being cut, which is the word that was used. But nothing was cut. There was no card announced. If we don't have more things in the pocket ready to go for a PLE than can fit in the PLE, I've done a terrible job."

Following Payback, Lynch defeated the NXT Women's Champion Tiffany Stratton, becoming the sixth Women's Grand Slam champion. She retained the title for 42 days until she lost it against Lyra Valkyria at Halloween Havoc.

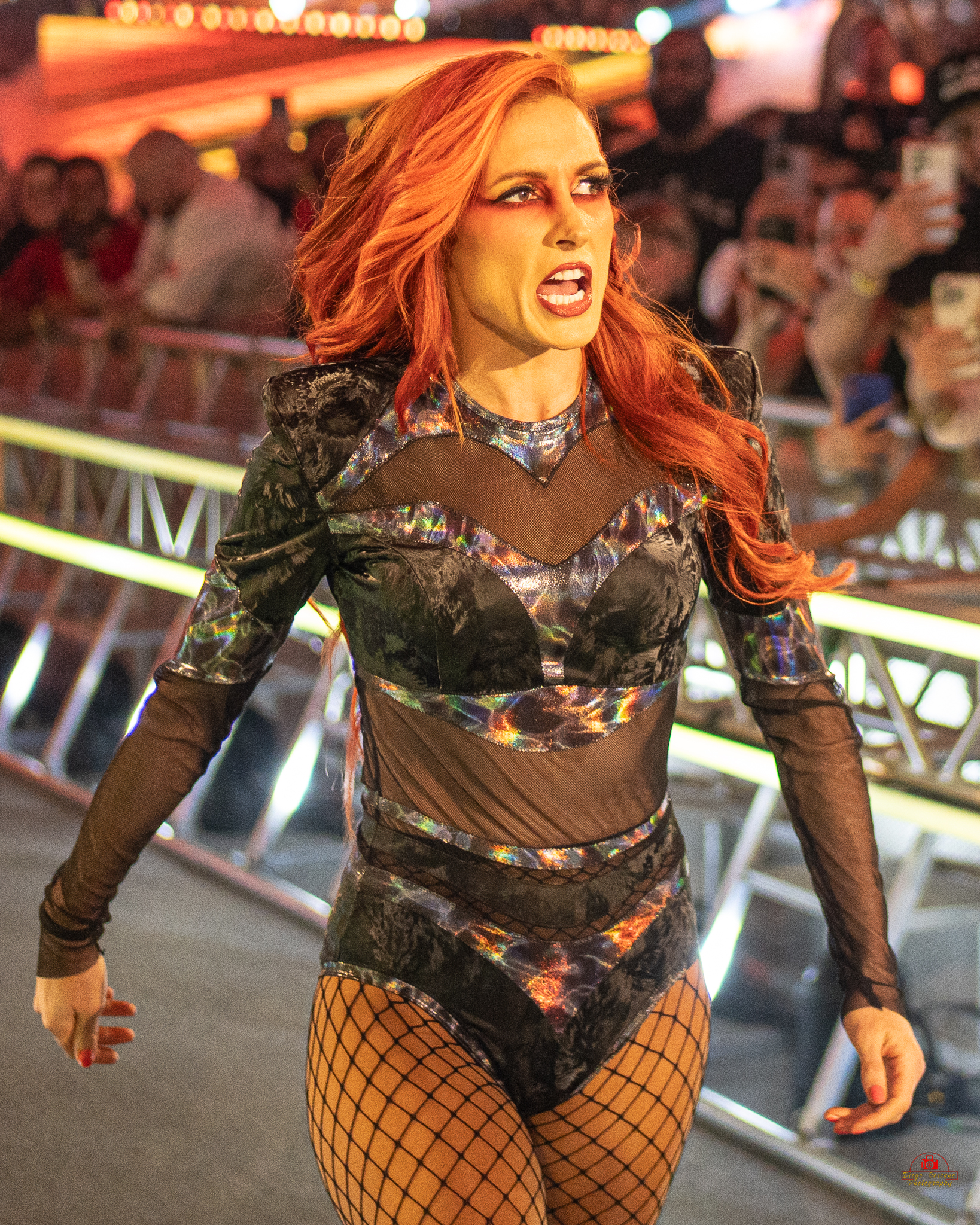
Lynch at the 2024 Royal Rumble

On 17 November episode of SmackDown, Lynch was announced as the fourth and final member of Bianca Belair's team at Survivor Series WarGames. At the event on 25 November, Lynch, Belair, Charlotte Flair and Shotzi defeated Damage CTRL (Bayley, Iyo Sky, Kairi Sane and Asuka) after Lynch pinned Bayley. Afterwards, Lynch reignited her feud with Nia Jax, which culminated in a match at Day 1 where Lynch was defeated by Jax. At the Royal Rumble on 27 January 2024, Lynch entered the Royal Rumble match at #21 and eliminated Chelsea Green before being eliminated by the debuting Jade Cargill. On 5 February episode of Raw, Lynch defeated Shayna Baszler to qualify for the women's Elimination Chamber match at Elimination Chamber: Perth, which Lynch won by last eliminating Liv Morgan, earning a Women's World Championship match against Rhea Ripley at WrestleMania XL. On Night 1 of WrestleMania XL on 6 April, Lynch failed to win the title from Ripley. After Ripley was forced to relinquish the title due to a legitimate shoulder injury, Lynch won a 14-woman Battle Royal on 22 April episode of Raw by last eliminating Morgan to win the vacant title, becoming a seven-time women's world champion. At King and Queen of the Ring on 25 May, Lynch lost the title to Morgan after accidental interference from Dominik Mysterio, ending her reign at 33 days. Two nights later on Raw, Lynch failed to regain the title from Morgan in a steel cage match after another accidental interference from Mysterio. On 1 June, it was reported that Lynch's WWE contract had expired and that she became a free agent.

==== Women's Intercontinental Champion (2025–2026) ====
On 7 January 2025, it was reported by Fightful that Lynch had signed a new contract with WWE. On 20 April, at Night 2 of WrestleMania 41, Lynch returned from an eleven-month hiatus as the tag team partner for Lyra Valkyria (in place of the injured Bayley), defeating Liv Morgan and Raquel Rodriguez to win the WWE Women's Tag Team Championship. On the following episode of Raw, the duo lost the titles back to Morgan and Rodriguez, ending their reign at only one day, marking the shortest reign in the title's history. After the match, Lynch attacked Valkyria, turning heel. On 28 April episode of Raw, Lynch revealed that she was the one that attacked Bayley before WrestleMania. At Backlash on 10 May, Lynch failed to win the Women's Intercontinental Championship from Valkyria. At Money in the Bank on 7 June, Lynch defeated Valkyria in a Last Chance match to win the title. On 23 June episode of Raw, Lynch defeated Bayley to retain the title via disqualification after being attacked by Valkyria. At Evolution on 13 July, Lynch retained the title against Bayley and Valkyria in a triple threat match. On Night 2 of SummerSlam on 3 August, Lynch retained the title against Valkyria in a no disqualification Last Chance match, ending their feud.

At Clash in Paris on 31 August, Lynch successfully defended the title against Nikki Bella. Later that night, Lynch helped her real-life husband Seth Rollins retain the World Heavyweight Championship. At Wrestlepalooza on 20 September, she teamed with Rollins against CM Punk and the returning AJ Lee in a mixed tag team match in a losing effort. On Raw on 17 November, thanks to a distraction from Lee, she lost the Women's Intercontinental Championship to Maxxine Dupri, ending her record-setting reign at 163 days. At Survivor Series: WarGames on November 29, Lynch along with Asuka, Kairi Sane, Lash Legend and Nia Jax lost to Rhea Ripley, Iyo Sky, Charlotte Flair, Alexa Bliss and AJ Lee in a WarGames match. Lynch regained the title from Dupri on 5 January 2026 episode of Raw. At the Royal Rumble on 31 January, Lynch entered the match at #9 eliminating Dupri before being eliminated by Nattie. At Elimination Chamber on 28 February, Lynch lost the title to Lee via submission, ending her second reign at 54 days, but regained the title on Night 1 of WrestleMania 42 on 18 April. At Saturday Night's Main Event XLIV on 23 May, Lynch lost to Sol Ruca by disqualification after pulling referee Jessika Carr to take a Sol Snatcher on her behalf. At Clash in Italy on 31 May, Lynch lost the title to Ruca ending her third reign at 43 days.

==== World Championship pursuits (2026–present) ====
After a two-month hiatus due to a broken vertebrae, Lynch made a surprise return on the August 3 episode of Raw as a face, confronting The Judgment Day (Women's World Champion Liv Morgan, Women's Intercontinental Champion Raquel Rodriguez and Roxanne Perez) and a returning Stephanie Vaquer. Lynch, as the special guest referee, helped Vaquer defeat Morgan for the title at a live event in Santiago, Chile on 12 September. At Money in the Bank on 10 October, Lynch failed to win the title in a triple threat match as it was won back by Morgan.

== Professional wrestling style and persona ==
Lynch uses both a Fujiwara armbar, called the "Dis-arm-her", and a Pumphandle side slam, called the "Manhandle Slam" as finishing maneuvers.

When Lynch was drafted to SmackDown following the 2016 WWE Draft, she used the nickname "The Irish Lass Kicker". From 2018 to 2020, she used the nickname "The Man". Upon her return and heel turn in 2021, she began to use the nickname "Big Time Becks". After turning face the following year, she reverted to her "The Man" nickname.

== Impact and legacy ==
Becky Lynch is certainly one of the biggest stars in WWE history and her legacy is cemented.

— Stephanie McMahon, WWE's Chief Brand Officer, on Lynch, in an interview with Digital Spy

Since 2018, Becky Lynch has been cited to be one of the most popular and recognizable wrestlers of her generation in WWE. Lynch was the inaugural SmackDown Women's Champion in 2016 and at one point, held both the Raw and Smackdown Women's titles at the same time. At WrestleMania 35 in 2019, Lynch, Charlotte Flair, and Ronda Rousey became the first women to have headlined WWE's flagship annual event, while Lynch was the first to have won a WrestleMania main event match.

Lynch holds the record for most main event matches at pay-per-view events in a single year for a female wrestler (3 in 2019). That same year, she became the first woman to have been named Pro Wrestling Illustrated's Most Popular Wrestler of the Year. Lynch was also the first and only female performer in WWE history to have led the company in merchandise sales in 2019. Her Last Woman Standing match against Charlotte Flair at WWE Evolution was ranked No. 1 by WWE on "The Top 25 Matches of 2018" list. This was the first women's match to accomplish this feat.

I can't think of another more iconic moment to define the fight, in another moment of photography, for the memory. That moment almost summarizes the change that was taking place in wrestling and how you, like you took over everything in the business and, it is almost thought that The Man was born there.

— CM Punk on Lynch's bloodied face moment in November 2018.

Wrestler Toni Storm cited Lynch as her biggest inspiration and said that she is "taking the women's division to a completely different level." In 2019, wrestling commentator Jim Ross called Lynch "the most over talent in WWE". In 2024, fellow wrestler Nia Jax said that "Lynch is going to go down as one of the greatest in our business".

Lynch is the first WWE wrestler to have appeared on the cover of ESPN The Magazine in 2019. As of April 2020, she was the sixth highest-paid WWE wrestler and the highest-paid woman according to Forbes, with a salary of US$3.1 million. In 2022, Glazia Magazine named Lynch as one of the Top Female Game-Changers in the 21st Century.

== Other media ==
Quin performed stunts for a 2013 episode of Vikings. She was written off WWE television for a few months in November 2017 to film The Marine 6: Close Quarters.

Becky Lynch is playable in ten WWE console games: WWE 2K17, WWE 2K18, WWE 2K19, WWE 2K20 (also one of the cover athletes), WWE 2K Battlegrounds, WWE 2K22, WWE 2K23, WWE 2K24, WWE 2K25 and WWE 2K26. Her entrance music is played after every goal scored on home ice by the American Hockey League's San Jose Barracuda.

On 1 November 2022, it was confirmed that Quin would make an appearance on the third-season premiere of Young Rock, playing Cyndi Lauper.

Lynch was a contestant on 15 November 2023 episode of Celebrity Jeopardy!, which drew a season high of 4.2 million viewers. On the episode, Lynch set a Jeopardy record by failing to correctly answer any of the standard sixty clues. Lynch managed to correctly answer two clues in the "Triple Jeopardy" round, which was added to the celebrity edition in 2022, as well as the "Final Jeopardy" clue.

On 26 March 2024, the autobiography Becky Lynch: The Man: Not Your Average Average Girl was released through Gallery Books. The book would become a New York Times Best Seller on 14 April 2024.

=== Other work ===
During her time away from wrestling, Quin worked as an actress and was cast in several plays in 2011 and 2012. She graduated with a degree in acting from the Dublin Institute of Technology, and has attended Columbia College Chicago and the Gaiety School of Acting. She also worked as a flight attendant with Aer Lingus for two and a half years.

== Personal life ==
Quin began dating fellow professional wrestler Colby Lopez, better known as Seth Rollins, in January 2019. Their relationship was made public in April, after months of speculation. The couple got engaged in August 2019. Their daughter was born in December 2020. Quin and Lopez got married on 29 June 2021. Quin's father, Ken, died in March 2021.

On 18 March 2024, Quin announced she had become an American citizen.

She is represented by Bryan Diperstein of Adventure Media, who preciously served as her agent at CAA.

== Trademark dispute ==
In September 2019, Ric Flair threatened legal action against WWE and filed a trademark for the term "The Man", which was being used as a nickname by Lynch. The threats of legal action caused a rift between Ric Flair and his daughter Charlotte, who was Lynch's onscreen nemesis at the time. Lynch responded to the actions by asserting that she still liked and respected Ric Flair. Ric Flair transferred the rights to "The Man" nickname and gimmick to WWE in May 2020. The terms of the transfer were undisclosed. Ric Flair began feuding with Lynch in 2021, accusing her of using the term without his explicit permission, but their dispute was resolved when he apologized to her in January 2023.

== Filmography ==
=== Film ===
Year	Title	Role	Notes
2018	The Marine 6: Close Quarters	Maddy Hayes	Film debut
2021	Rumble	Axehammer (voice)	
2025	Happy Gilmore 2	Flex	

=== Television ===
Year	Title	Role	Notes
2013	Vikings	Stunt double	1 episode
2018	Carpool Karaoke: The Series	Herself	Episode: "WWE: Triple H, Stephanie McMahon & More"
2019	Straight Up Steve Austin	Herself	Episode: "Becky Lynch"
2019	Ridiculousness	Herself	Episode: "Becky Lynch"
2020	Billions	Herself	Episode: "The New Decas"
2020	Game On!	Herself	Episode: "Celebrity Guests: Becky Lynch and Joel McHale"
2022	WWE Rivals	Herself	Episode: "Triple H vs. Mick Foley"
2022–2023	Young Rock	Cyndi Lauper	2 episodes – Credited as Rebecca Quin
2022–2023	Biography: WWE Legends	Herself	3 episodes: "WrestleMania 1", "Bella Twins" and "Dusty Rhodes"
2023	Weakest Link	Herself	Episode: "WWE Superstars Special"
2023	Celebrity Family Feud	Herself	1 episode
2023	The Kelly Clarkson Show	Herself	Season 4, episode 88 – The Kelly Clarkson Show – Ava Max, Becky Lynch, Seal
2023	Celebrity Jeopardy!	Herself	1 episode
2026	Star Trek: Starfleet Academy	Lieutenant Ya	2 episodes – Credited as Rebecca Quin

=== Web series ===
Year	Title	Role	Notes
2018–present	UpUpDownDown	Herself / Soulless Senpai	

=== Video games ===
Year	Title	Notes	Ref.
2016	WWE 2K17	Video game debut	
2017	WWE 2K18	—N/a	
2018	WWE 2K19	—N/a	
2019	WWE 2K20	Cover athlete	
2019	Brawlhalla	Crossover WWE character	
2020	The King of Fighters All Star	Crossover character	
2020	WWE 2K Battlegrounds	—N/a	
2022	WWE 2K22	—N/a	
2023	Tom Clancy's Rainbow Six Siege	Crossover costume for Thorn	
2023	WWE 2K23	—N/a	
2023	Fortnite	Crossover character	
2024	WWE 2K24	—N/a	
2025	WWE 2K25	—N/a	
2026	WWE 2K26	—N/a	

== Bibliography ==
- Quin, Rebecca (2024). Becky Lynch: The Man: Not Your Average Average Girl (Hardcover). New York City: Gallery Books. ISBN 978-1982157258.

== Championships and accomplishments ==
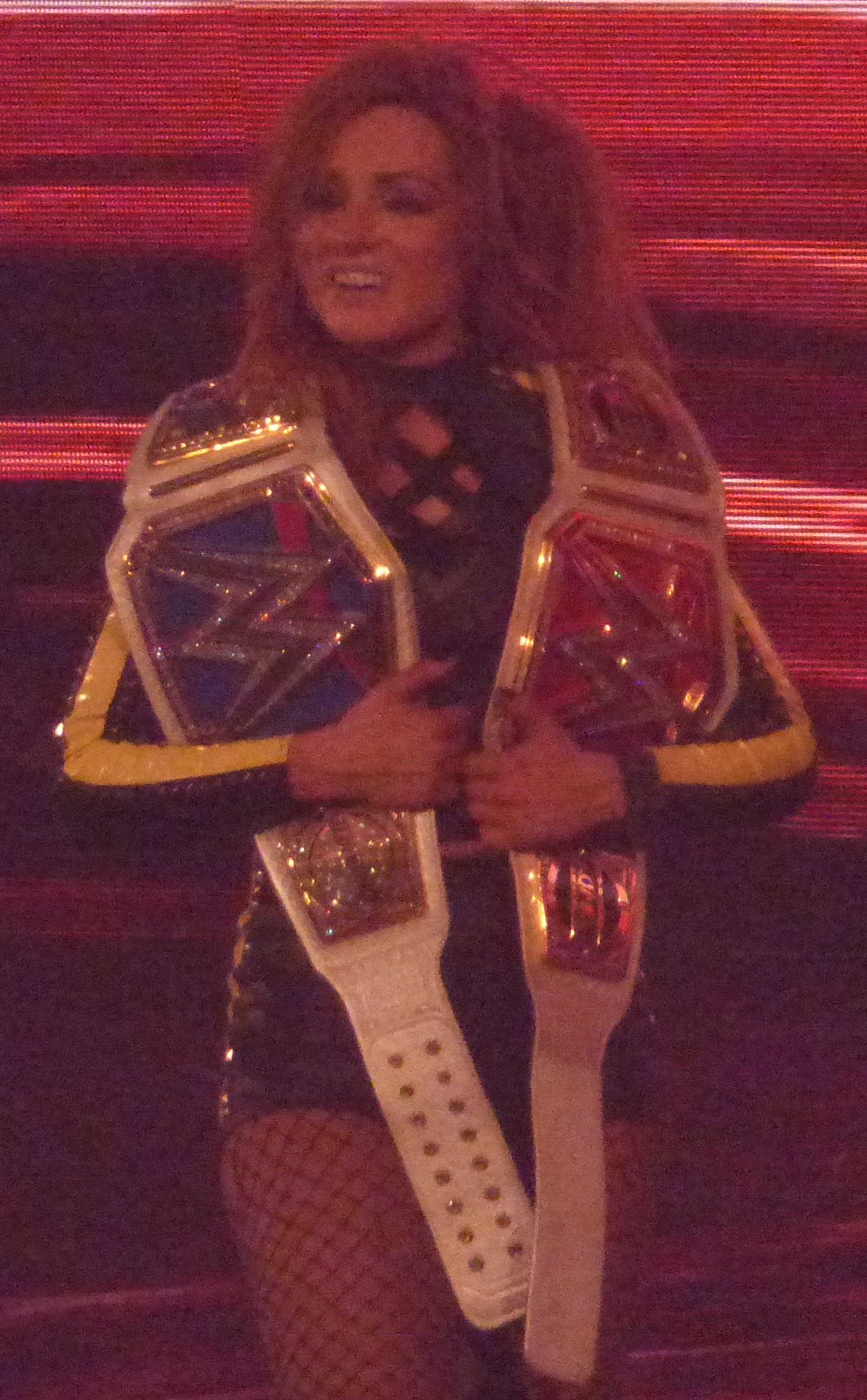
Lynch is a seven-time world champion in WWE, having held the SmackDown/Women's World Championship (left shoulder) five times and the Raw/WWE Women's Championship (right shoulder) twice. She is also the only one to have held both titles simultaneously.

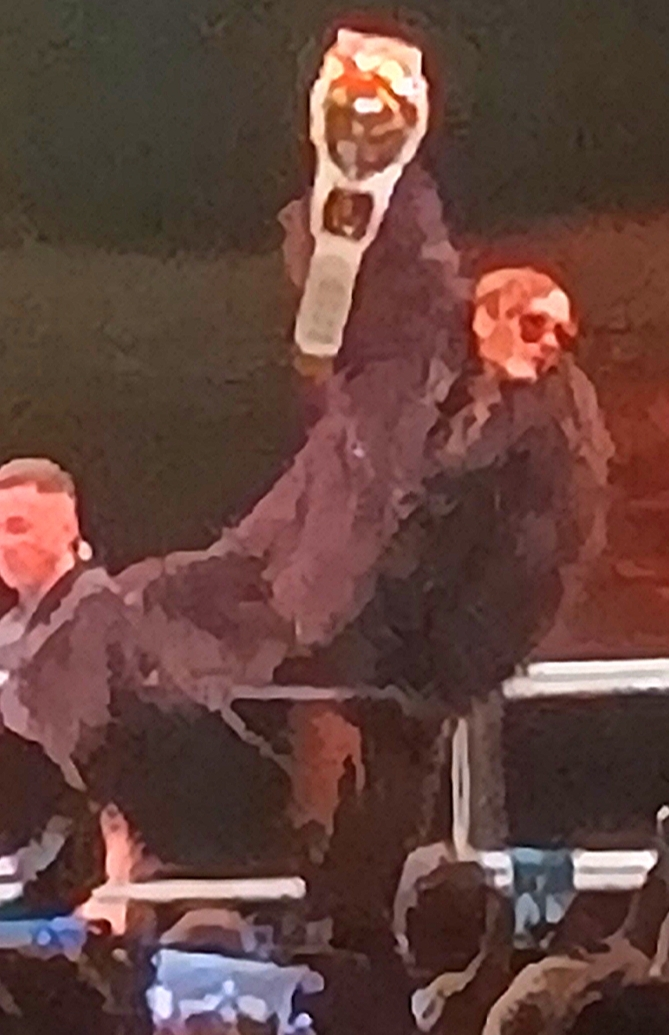
Lynch is a three-time WWE Women's Intercontinental Champion and holds the records for the most reigns, longest individual reign, and longest combined reign.

- CBS Sports
  - Best Moment of the Year (2018) – Attacking Ronda Rousey on Raw
  - Wrestler of the Year (2018)
  - WWE Match of the Year (2018) vs. Asuka and Charlotte Flair at TLC
- New York Post
  - Female Wrestler of the Year (2023)
- Pro Wrestling Illustrated
  - Most Popular Wrestler (2019)
  - Woman of the Year (2018, 2019)
  - Ranked No. 1 of the top 100 female wrestlers in the PWI Women's 100 in 2019
- Queens of Chaos
  - World Queens of Chaos Championship (1 time)
- Sports Illustrated
  - Ranked No. 10 of the top 10 wrestlers of 2023
  - Women's Wrestler of the Year (2018, 2019)
  - Ranked No. 20 of the 20 Greatest WWE Wrestlers Of All Time
- SuperGirls Wrestling
  - SuperGirls Championship (1 time)
- Wrestling Observer Newsletter
  - Worst Feud of the Year (2015) Team PCB vs. Team B.A.D. vs. Team Bella
  - Women's Wrestling MVP (2018, 2019)
  - Best Pro Wrestling Book (2024) Becky Lynch: The Man: Not Your Average Average Girl
- WWE
  - WWE Raw Women's Championship (2 times)
  - Women's World Championship (Note: Lynch's first four reigns occurred when the title was known as the SmackDown Women's Championship.) (5 times, inaugural)
  - WWE Women's Intercontinental Championship (3 times)
  - NXT Women's Championship (1 time)
  - WWE Women's Tag Team Championship (2 times) – with Lita (1), Lyra Valkyria (1)
  - Women's Royal Rumble (2019)
  - Sixth Women's Triple Crown Champion
  - Sixth Women's Grand Slam Champion
  - WWE Year-End Awards (3 times)
    - Female Superstar of the Year (2018, 2019)
    - Match of the Year (2018) vs. Charlotte Flair at Evolution

== Footnotes ==
Preceded by Asuka	Women's Royal Rumble winner 2019	Succeeded by Charlotte Flair
