= Bambi Hall =

Canadian pro wrestler

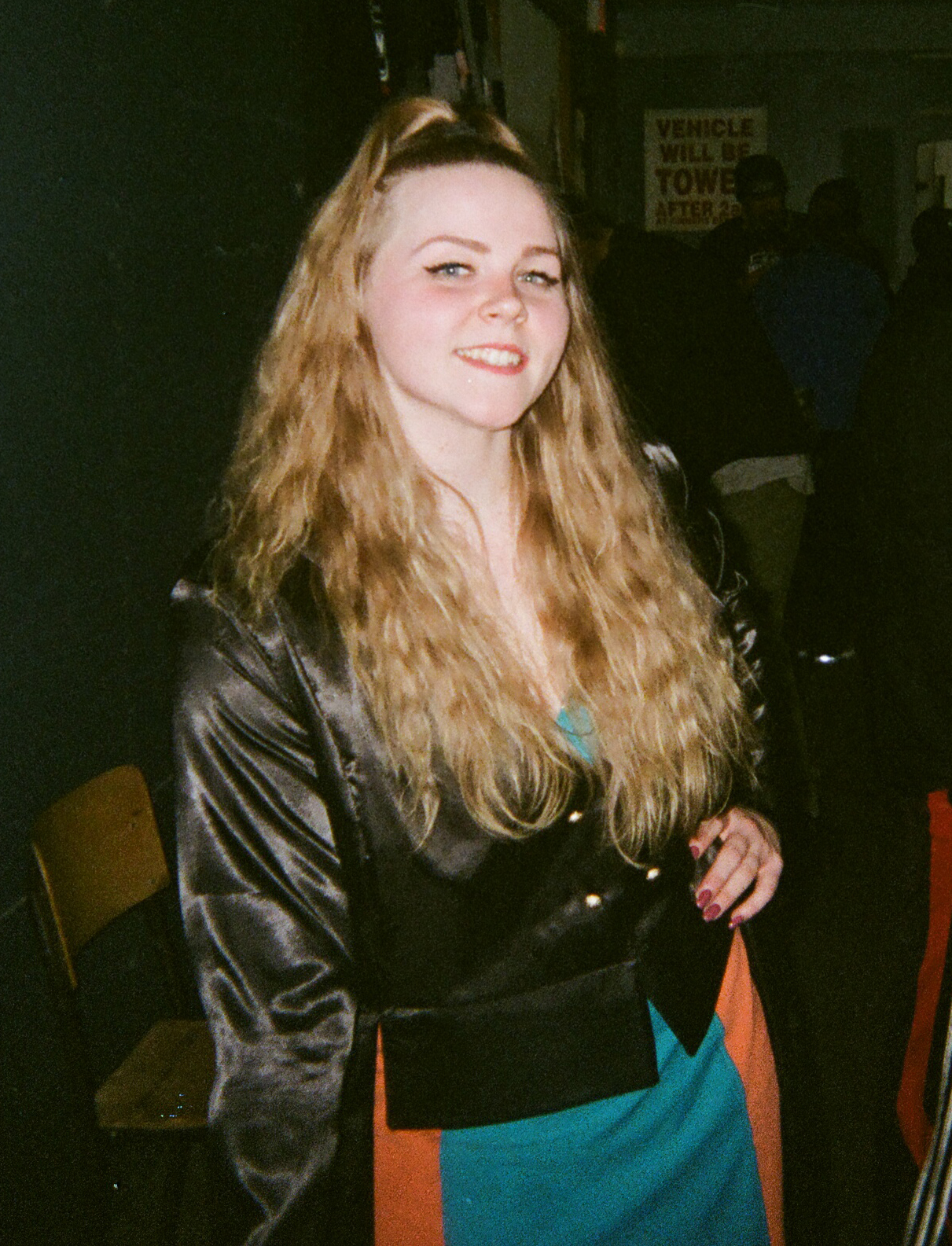
- Hall at the Girls Gone Wild All-Star Wrestling event February 25, 2017; Cloverdale, BC
- Born: Samantha Hall; July 14, 1992 (age 34); Surrey, British Columbia, Canada
- Height: 5 ft 6 in (1.68 m)
- Professional wrestling career
- Ring name(s): Bambi Hall; Sammy Hall; Waspette
- Trained by: Disco Fury; Michelle Star
- Debut: June 18, 2011

Samantha Hall (born July 14, 1992), better known by her ring name Bambi Hall, is a Canadian female professional wrestler who works on the American and Canadian independent circuit. She is best known for her time in All-Star Wrestling based in British Columbia. She is a former 4-time ASW Women's Champion. She won Female Wrestler in 2016 as well as Most Popular Wrestler in 2016 and 2017. She also teams with her sister Lizza Hall; they were 3-2-1 Battle! Tag Team Champions in 2018. Her signature move is called the 'swinging neck breaker'.

== Career ==
=== All-Star Wrestling ===
On April 11, 2014; she defeated Riea Von Slasher and KC Spinelli in a Triple Threat match to become the first All-Star Wrestling Women's Champion.

=== Other promotions ===
Hall competed in the first ever women's ladder match in 2015 against Riea Von Slasher. Hall was also Pro Wrestling Illustrated's 2012 rookie of the year third runner up, and is also the first Canadian woman independent wrestler to do so. As well as those accomplishments PWI also ranked her #46 in the 2013 PWI Top 50 Females.

== Personal life ==
Hall is a second generation wrestler, as she is the daughter of professional wrestler Raven Lake, and comes from a wrestling family, as her younger sister Liiza Hall is also a professional wrestler. Hall cited Beth Phoenix as one of her favorite wrestlers growing up. Hall claims that her favorite match that she has competed in was against Sarah Stock for the Beauty Slammers Women's Wrestling Championship. Her favorite sport is Volleyball, her favorite band is Maroon 5, and her hobbies are art and drawing. As a teenager she was an avid painter studying at Emily Carr Art Institute, specializing in both oil and acrylic on canvas.

== Championships and accomplishments ==
- 3-2-1 Battle!
  - 3-2-1 Battle! Solid Steel Championship (1 time)
  - 3-2-1 Battle! Tag Team Championship (2 time) - with Liiza Hall
  - 3-2-1 Battle! "Rebel Girls" Tournament Winner (2018)
- All Star Wrestling (British Columbia)
  - ASW Women's Championship (4 times)
  - Female Wrestler of the Year (2016)
  - Most Popular Wrestler of the Year (2016, 2017)
- Beauty Slammers Wrestling
  - The Beauty Slammers Championship (1 time)
- Big West Wrestling
  - Women's Wrestler of the Year (2016)
- Canadian National Wrestling Alliance
  - CNWA Women's Championship (1 time)
  - Rookie of the Year (2012)
- Elite Canadian Championship Wrestling
  - ECCW Women's Championship (1 time)
- Pro Wrestling Illustrated
  - PWI ranked her #46 of the 50 best females wrestlers of the year in the PWI 50 Females in 2013
- Thrash Wrestling
  - Most Improved (2016)
  - Thrash Wrestling Okanagan/Interior Championship (1 time, current)
- Wild Okanagan Wrestling
  - Female Wrestler of the Year (2016)
  - Most Improved (2016)
