= Heather McMahan =

American comedian, actress (born 1986/1987)

- Born: 1986/1987 (age 39–40); Atlanta, Georgia, U.S.
- Education: University of Mississippi (BFA)
- Occupations: Actress; comedian
- Years active: 2015–present

Heather McMahan (born 1986/1987) is an American comedian and actress. She is known for her comedy tours and podcast and also in her roles in the 2021 American romantic comedy Love Hard and If Loving You Is Wrong. She has also appeared on Celebrity Jeopardy!

She attended the University of Mississippi, where she was a member of Delta Gamma, and graduated in 2009 with a fine arts degree in theatre. She is married to Jeff Daniels, a consultant at Danco Worldwide Consultants.

Her first comedy special, Son I Never Had, debuted on Netflix in October 2023. McMahan's second stand-up comedy special, Breadwinner, was released on Hulu in October 2024.

McMahan launched her weekly podcast Absolutely Not with the network Dear Media on July 3, 2019.

At the 2025 Ryder Cup hosted at Bethpage Black Course on September 27, 2025, McMahan had been hired to be the MC at the first tee when the American audience joined in a "Fuck you Rory" chant about golfer Rory McIlroy of Team Europe. Initial reporting that McMahon "began" or "led" the chant was misleading. Looking for a scapegoat for rowdy and drunken US fan behavior, the PGA of America released McMahan from that role for the final day of the tournament, and soon after reached a deal with Good Good Golf to sponsor a 2026 PGA tournament. McMahon -- a long-time fan of McIlroy -- apologized to McIlroy and Ryder Cup Europe about the incident.
