= Ronald J. Fitzsimmons =

Ronald J. "Ron" Fitzsimmons is the Executive Director of Alice's Kids, a 501(c)(3) non-profit charitable organization based in Alexandria, Virginia. Founded in 2011 by Ron and his sister, Alice's Kids provides immediate assistance to children identified by teachers, social workers, and others as urgently in need of clothes, school or athletic equipment, or other items their families or other charities are unable to provide.

In the 1970s, Fitzsimmons led an extensive inquiry into the Plum Island Animal Disease Center as a summer intern for Congressman Thomas J. Downey.

Fitzsimmons was the Director of Government Relations for the National Abortion Rights Action League from 1982 to 1985, and the Executive Director of the National Coalition of Abortion Providers (NCAP) from its founding in 1991 until 2004. In 1993, he was named one of the top 50 "Hired Guns" on Capitol Hill by Washingtonian magazine.

In that position, Fitzsimmons successfully lobbied for legislation that prohibited anti-abortion activists from obtaining information from a woman's license plate who happened to be at the clinic. He also passed an amendment that would have withheld Community Development Block Grant funds from being distributed to any city that refused to enforce the laws giving access to abortion clinics.
