= City of Refuge (Atlanta) =

American non-profit organization

City of Refuge is a nonprofit organization.

The City of Refuge was founded in July 1997 by Bruce Deel, the senior pastor of The Mission Church. Deel is a graduate of the Lee university of Cleveland. He has received numerous awards and for his success with the City of Refuge.

City of Refuge is located at 1300 Joseph E. Boone Blvd. Atlanta, GA 30314.
