= Alice's Kids =

Nonprofit organization

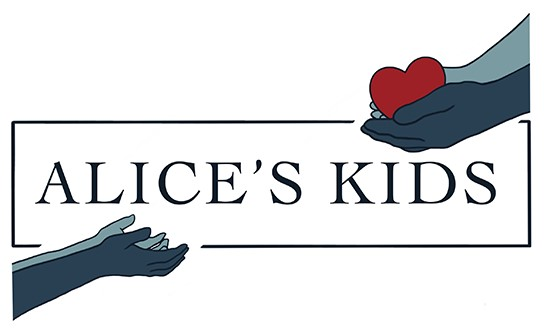
- Founded: June 17, 2011; 15 years ago
- Type: 501(c)(3)
- Tax ID no.: 45-2390871
- Legal status: Charity
- Location: Mount Vernon, Virginia, U.S.
- President: Laura Fitzsimmons Peters
- Executive Director: Ron Fitzsimmons
- Website: aliceskids.org

Alice's Kids is a 501(c)(3) charitable organization founded by Ron Fitzsimmons and Laura Fitzsimmons Peters in 2011 in memory of their mother. It provides targeted assistance to children in grades K-12 in the US.

Alice's Kids focuses on providing basic necessities, school supplies, services, and entertainment for the children of low-income families. Company policy implies that children should not guess that helping them is a charity.

In most cases, a teacher, coach, or social worker nominates a child who has a specific need. If approved, the grant funding is electronically sent to the nominator, who then uses the funding to take care of the child's needs.

Alice's Kids has worked with celebrities like Steve Carell and Patton Oswalt.
