= Goddesses of Stardom Tag League =

- The Goddesses of Stardom Tag League prize is represented by a pair of rings resembling the Goddesses of Stardom Championship design
- Promotions: World Wonder Ring Stardom
- Other names: Goddesses of Stardom Tag Title League
- First event: 2011
- Signature matches: Tag team matches

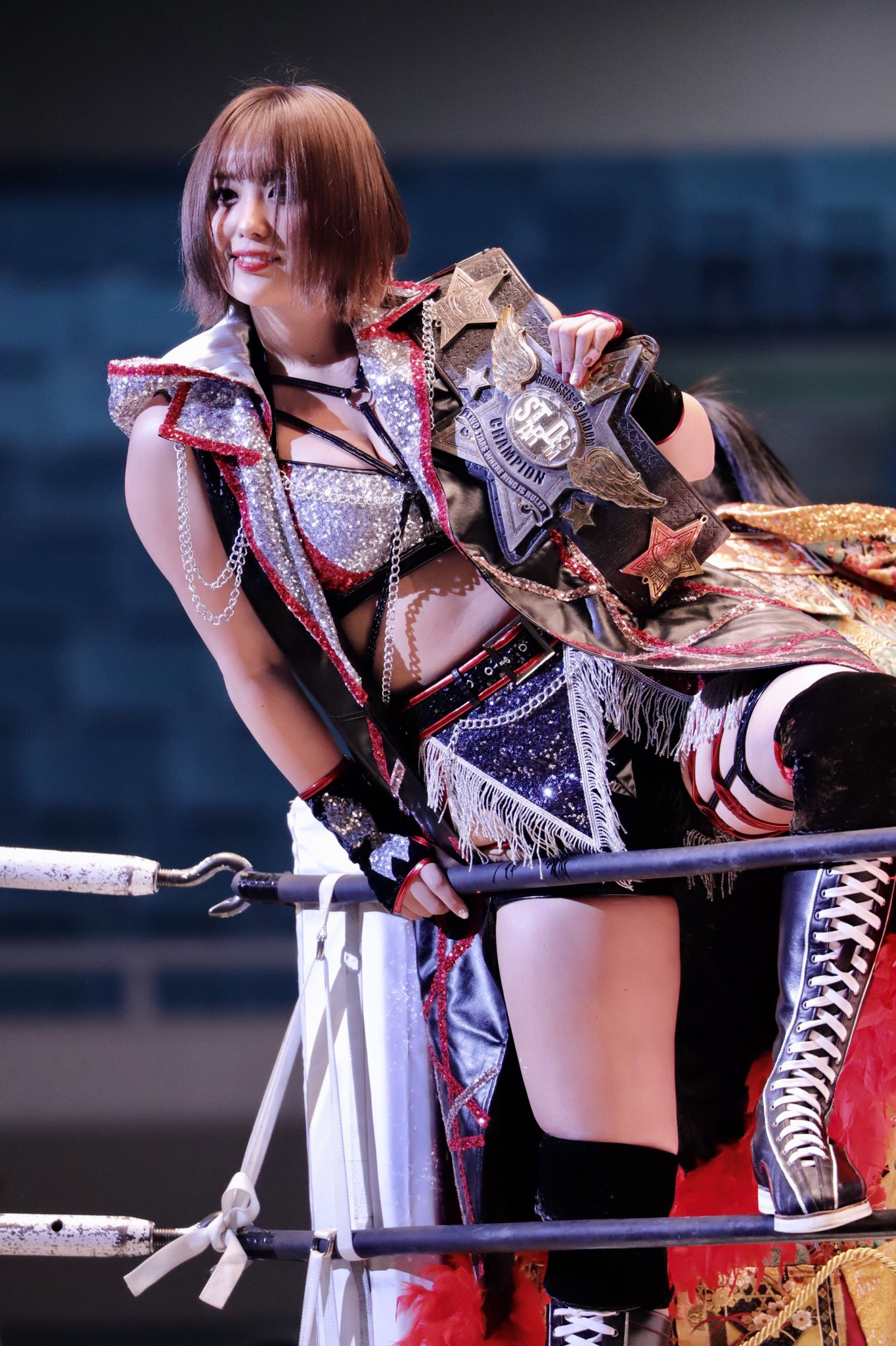
Himeka with the Goddesses of Stardom Championship

The Goddesses of Stardom Tag League (スターダムタグリーグの女神, Sutādamutagurīgu no megami) is a professional wrestling round-robin tag team tournament held annually by the Japanese professional wrestling promotion World Wonder Ring Stardom. It was created in 2011.

The Goddesses of Stardom Tag League are held under a multi-point system. Two points for a win, one for a time-limit draw, and none for any other kind of loss. The team finishing atop the points standings are considered the winners of their respective blocks. The winners of the final match between both block winners will be considered the champions. All the matches in the tournament have a 20-minute time limit. The tournament was previously known as the Goddesses of Stardom Tag Title League until 2012 when it was also disputed for the Goddesses of Stardom Championship. From 2012 to date, the winners of the tournament only receive the right to challenge for the titles as number one contenders.

The first winners of the league were Yoko Bito and Yuzuki Aikawa who won the tournament on July 27, 2011, also being crowned the inaugural Goddesses of Stardom Champions. Kairi Hojo, Yoko Bito, Nanae Takahashi and Momo Watanabe share the record for the most individual victories with two, with different partners.

== Tournament history ==
The Goddesses of Stardom Tag League is a professional wrestling tournament held each autumn by Stardom. Similar to Bushiroad-owned male counterpart New Japan Pro-Wrestling with the World Tag League or the Super Junior Tag League. It is currently held as a round-robin tournament with wrestlers split into two pools. The winners of each pool will compete in the final to decide the winner. As is the case with the NJPW World Tag Leagues, a win is two points and a draw is one point for each wrestler.

There have been a total of fifteen editions of the tournament from which fifteen teams emerged as winners, being composed of twenty distinctive wrestlers.

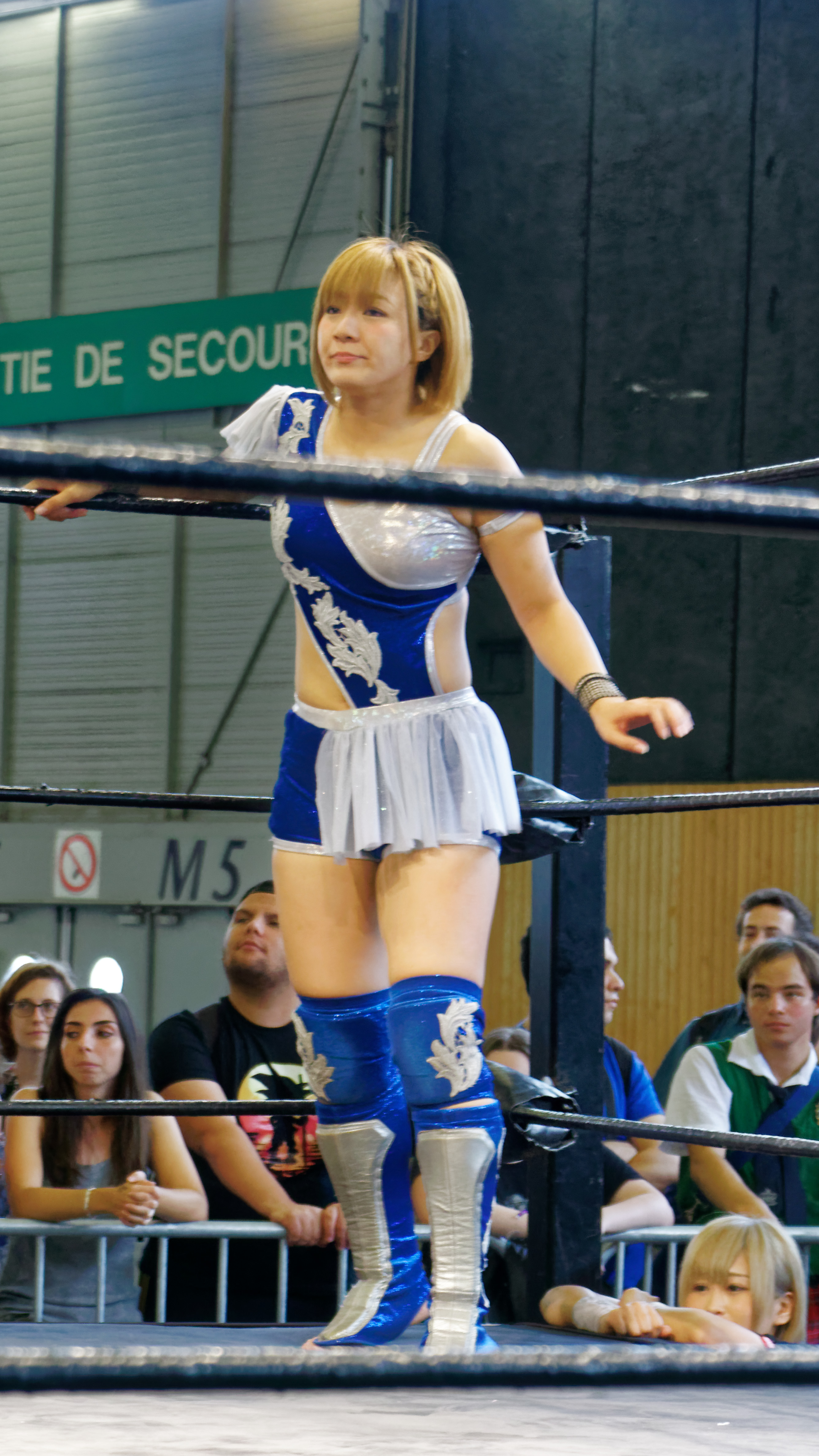
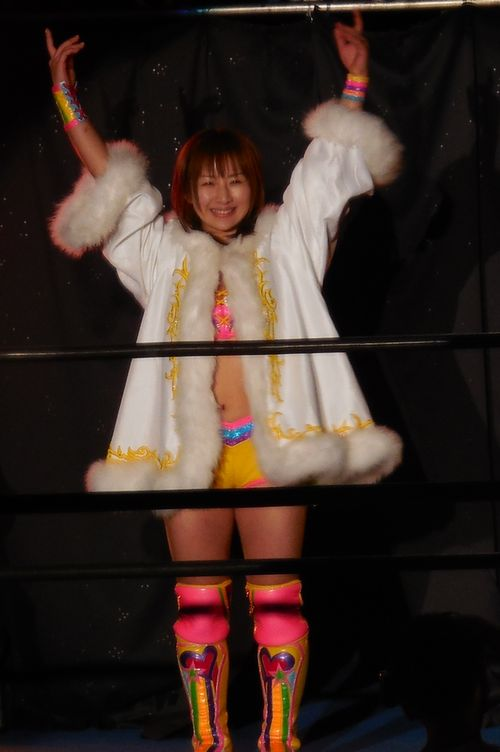
Inaugural winners, Yoko Bito (left) and Yuzuki Aikawa (right)

Year	Winners	Ref.
2011	Yoko Bito and Yuzuki Aikawa	
2012	Natsuki Taiyo and Yoshiko	
2013	Act Yasukawa and Kyoko Kimura	
2014	Kairi Hojo and Nanae Takahashi	
2015	Thunder Rock; Io Shirai and Mayu Iwatani	
2016	Kairi Hojo (2) and Yoko Bito (2)	
2017	Bea Priestley and Kelly Klein	
2018	Momo Watanabe and Utami Hayashishita	
2019	DREAM✰SHiNE; Arisa Hoshiki and Tam Nakano	
2020	MOMOAZ; AZM and Momo Watanabe (2)	
2021	FWC; Hazuki and Koguma	
2022	7Upp (Nanae Takahashi (2) and Yuu)	
2023	Divine Kingdom (Maika and Megan Bayne)	
2024	wing★gori (Hanan and Saya Iida)	
2025	Sakurara (Aya Sakura and Sayaka Kurara)	

== 2011 ==
Goddesses of Stardom Tag League
- 2011

Tournament information
- Sport: Professional wrestling
- Location: Japan
- Dates: October 10, 2011–November 27, 2011
- Tournament format: Round-robin
- Host: World Wonder Ring Stardom
- Participants: 4

Final positions
- Champions: Yoko Bito and Yuzuki Aikawa
- Runner-up: Natsuki Taiyo and Yoshiko

Tournament statistics
- Matches played: 7

The first edition took place from October 10 to November 27, 2011.

Final standings
Natsuki Taiyo and Yoshiko	4
Yoko Bito and Yuzuki Aikawa	4
Io Shirai and Nanae Takahashi	2
Arisa Hoshiki and Mayu Iwatani	2

	Aikawa Bito	Hoshiki Iwatani	Shirai Takahashi	Taiyo Yoshiko
Aikawa Bito	—N/a	Aikawa; Bito (9:49)	Aikawa; Bito (19:12)	Taiyo; Yoshiko (10:25)
Hoshiki Iwatani	Aikawa; Bito (9:49)	—N/a	Shirai; Takahashi (19:25)	Hoshiki; Iwatani (15:46)
Shirai Takahashi	Aikawa; Bito (19:12)	Shirai; Takahashi (19:25)	—N/a	Taiyo; Yoshiko (19:05)
Taiyo Yoshiko	Taiyo; Yoshiko (10:25)	Hoshiki; Iwatani (15:46)	Taiyo; Yoshiko (19:05)	—N/a

Final (November 27, 2011)
Natsuki Taiyo and Yoshiko
Yoko Bito and Yuzuki Aikawa	16:15

== 2012 ==
Goddesses of Stardom Tag League
- 2012

Tournament information
- Sport: Professional wrestling
- Location: Japan
- Dates: October 10, 2012–November 25, 2012
- Tournament format: Two-block round-robin
- Host: World Wonder Ring Stardom
- Participants: 8

Final positions
- Champions: Natsuki Taiyo and Yoshiko
- Runner-up: Kairi Hojo and Natsumi Showzuki

Tournament statistics
- Matches played: 13

The 2012 edition took place from October 10 to November 25, 2012, and featured two blocks.

Final standings
Blue Block		Red Block	
Ho-Show Tennyo (Kairi Hojo and Natsumi Showzuki)	4	Kawasaki Katsushika Saikyou Densetsu (Natsuki Taiyo and Yoshiko)	4
Nanamiho (Miho Wakizawa and Nanae Takahashi)	4	Yuhi and Yuzuki Aikawa	4
Kimura Monster-gun (Christina Von Eerie and Kyoko Kimura)	3	Eri Susa and NOZOMI	2
Act Yasukawa and Saki Kashima	1	Thunder Rock (Io Shirai and Mayu Iwatani)	2

Blue	Hojo Showzuki	Kashima Yasukawa	Kimura Von Eerie	Takahashi Wakizawa
Hojo Showzuki	—N/a	Draw (15:00)	Draw (15:00)	Hojo; Showzuki (14:20)
Kashima Yasukawa	Draw (15:00)	—N/a	Kimura; Von Eerie (9:45)	Takahashi; Wakizawa (14:35)
Kimura Von Eerie	Draw (15:00)	Kimura; Von Eerie (9:45)	—N/a	Takahashi; Wakizawa (14:32)
Takahashi Wakizawa	Hojo; Showzuki (14:20)	Takahashi; Wakizawa (14:35)	Takahashi; Wakizawa (14:32)	—N/a
Red	Aikawa Yuhi	Iwatani Shirai	NOZOMI Susa	Taiyo Yoshiko
Aikawa Yuhi	—N/a	Aikawa; Yuhi (12:42)	Aikawa; Yuhi (9:22)	Taiyo; Yoshiko (14:21)
Iwatani Shirai	Aikawa; Yuhi (12:42)	—N/a	NOZOMI; Susa (8:54)	Iwatani; Shirai (13:47)
NOZOMI Susa	Aikawa; Yuhi (9:22)	NOZOMI; Susa (8:54)	—N/a	Taiyo; Yoshiko (8:04)
Taiyo Yoshiko	Taiyo; Yoshiko (14:21)	Iwatani; Shirai (13:47)	Taiyo; Yoshiko (8:04)	—N/a

Final (November 25, 2012)
Blue	Kairi Hojo and Natsumi Showzuki
Red	Natsuki Taiyo and Yoshiko	9:50

== 2013 ==
Goddesses of Stardom Tag League
- 2013

Tournament information
- Sport: Professional wrestling
- Location: Japan
- Dates: October 20, 2013–November 23, 2013
- Tournament format: Single-elimination
- Host: World Wonder Ring Stardom
- Participants: 8

Final positions
- Champions: Act Yasukawa and Kyoko Kimura
- Runner-up: Alpha Female and Female Predator Amazon

Tournament statistics
- Matches played: 7

The 2013 edition took place from October 20 to November 23, 2013, and was a single-elimination tournament.

Quarterfinals
Act Yasukawa and Kyoko Kimura
Kaori Yoneyama and Yuhi	15:39
Io Shirai and Takumi Iroha
Kairi Hojo and Nanae Takahashi	17:50
Alpha Female and Female Predator Amazon
Mayu Iwatani and Miho Wakizawa	11:23
DASH Chisako and Sendai Sachiko
Natsuki Taiyo and Yoshiko	13:02

Semifinals
Act Yasukawa and Kyoko Kimura
Kairi Hojo and Nanae Takahashi	16:49
Alpha Female and Female Predator Amazon
Natsuki Taiyo and Yoshiko	10:16

Finals
Act Yasukawa and Kyoko Kimura
Alpha Female and Female Predator Amazon	12:40

== 2014 ==
Goddesses of Stardom Tag League
- 2014

Tournament information
- Sport: Professional wrestling
- Location: Japan
- Dates: October 12, 2014–November 16, 2014
- Tournament format: Two-block round-robin
- Host: World Wonder Ring Stardom
- Participants: 8

Final positions
- Champions: Kairi Hojo and Nanae Takahashi
- Runner-up: Thunder Rock (Io Shirai and Mayu Iwatani)

Tournament statistics
- Matches played: 13

The 2014 edition took place from October 12 to November 16, 2014, and returned to a round-robin tournament format. The Reo Hazuki and Yoshiko vs Risa Sera and Takumi Iroha match took place at an Ice Ribbon show.

Final standings
Blue Block		Red Block	
Thunder Rock (Io Shirai and Mayu Iwatani)	4	Kairi Hojo and Nanae Takahashi	5
Mystique and Star Fire	4	Risa Sera and Takumi Iroha	3
Hatsuhinode Kamen and Kaori Yoneyama	2	Reo Hazuki and Yoshiko	2
Koguma and Miho Wakizawa	2	Kimura Monster-gun (Kris Wolf and Kyoko Kimura)	2

Blue	Fire Mystique	Iwatani Shirai	Kamen Yoneyama	Koguma Wakizawa
Fire Mystique	—N/a	Iwatani; Shirai (10:27)	Fire; Mystique (6:59)	Fire; Mystique (10:14)
Iwatani Shirai	Iwatani; Shirai (10:27)	—N/a	Iwatani; Shirai (11:08)	Koguma; Wakizawa (12:29)
Kamen Yoneyama	Fire; Mystique (6:59)	Iwatani; Shirai (11:08)	—N/a	Kamen; Yoneyama (10:49)
Koguma Wakizawa	Fire; Mystique (10:14)	Koguma; Wakizawa (12:29)	Kamen; Yoneyama (10:49)	—N/a
Red	Hazuki Yoshiko	Hojo Takahashi	Kimura Wolf	Iroha Sera
Hazuki Yoshiko	—N/a	Hojo; Takahashi (14:20)	Hazuki; Yoshiko (13:17)	Iroha; Sera (12:42)
Hojo Takahashi	Hojo; Takahashi (14:20)	—N/a	Hojo; Takahashi (13:22)	Draw (15:00)
Kimura Wolf	Hazuki; Yoshiko (13:17)	Hojo; Takahashi (13:22)	—N/a	Kimura; Wolf (12:48)
Iroha Sera	Iroha; Sera (12:42)	Draw (15:00)	Kimura; Wolf (12:48)	—N/a

Final (November 16, 2014)
Blue	Io Shirai and Mayu Iwatani	Pin
Red	Kairi Hojo and Nanae Takahashi	17:32

== 2015 ==
Goddesses of Stardom Tag League
- 2015

Tournament information
- Sport: Professional wrestling
- Location: Japan
- Date: November 8, 2015
- Tournament format: Single-elimination
- Host: World Wonder Ring Stardom
- Participants: 8

Final positions
- Champions: Thunder Rock (Io Shirai and Mayu Iwatani)
- Runner-up: Hiroyo Matsumoto and Santana Garrett

Tournament statistics
- Matches played: 6

The 2015 edition took place on November 8, 2015, and was a single-elimination tournament.

Quarterfinals
Datura and Momo Watanabe
Hiromi Mimura and Starlight Kid	6:38
Hiroyo Matsumoto and Santana Garrett
Kris Wolf and Kyoko Kimura	10:15
Io Shirai and Mayu Iwatani
Alex Lee and Kaori Yoneyama	11:14
Act Yasukawa and Holidead	Draw
Haruka Kato and Kairi Hojo	15:00

Semifinals
Datura and Momo Watanabe
Hiroyo Matsumoto and Santana Garrett	3:34
Io Shirai and Mayu Iwatani	Bye

Final
Hiroyo Matsumoto and Santana Garrett
Io Shirai and Mayu Iwatani	14:02

== 2016 ==
Goddesses of Stardom Tag League
- 2016

Tournament information
- Sport: Professional wrestling
- Location: Japan
- Dates: October 23, 2016–November 11, 2016
- Tournament format: Two-block round-robin
- Host: World Wonder Ring Stardom
- Participants: 8

Final positions
- Champions: Kairi Hojo and Yoko Bito
- Runner-up: Thunder Rock (Io Shirai and Mayu Iwatani)

Tournament statistics
- Matches played: 13

The 2016 tournament took place from October 23 to November 11, 2016.

Final standings
Blue Block		Red Block	
Kairi Hojo and Yoko Bito	4	Thunder Rock (Io Shirai and Mayu Iwatani)	5
Twisted Sisterz (Holidead and Thunder Rosa)	4	Owens Twins (Kasey Owens and Leah Owens)	3
Chelsea Green and Santana Garrett	3	JKGReeeeN (Jungle Kyona and Momo Watanabe)	2
Hiromi Mimura and Saori Anou	1	Oedo Tai (Kagetsu and Kris Wolf)	2

Blue	Anou Mimura	Bito Hojo	Garrett Green	Holidead Rosa
Anou Mimura	—N/a	Bito; Hojo (11:28)	Draw (15:00)	Holidead; Rosa (7:26)
Bito Hojo	Bito; Hojo (11:28)	—N/a	Garrett; Green (11:23)	Bito; Hojo (8:44)
Garrett Green	Draw (15:00)	Garrett; Green (11:23)	—N/a	Holidead; Rosa (10:31)
Holidead Rosa	Holidead; Rosa (7:26)	Bito; Hojo (8:44)	Holidead; Rosa (10:31)	—N/a
Red	Iwatani Shirai	Kagetsu Wolf	Kyona Watanabe	Owens Owens
Iwatani Shirai	—N/a	Iwatani; Shirai (14:30)	Iwatani; Shirai (8:27)	Draw (15:00)
Kagetsu Wolf	Iwatani; Shirai (14:30)	—N/a	Kyona; Watanabe (10:56)	Kagetsu; Wolf (9:44)
Kyona Watanabe	Iwatani; Shirai (8:27)	Kyona; Watanabe (10:56)	—N/a	Owens; Owens (10:06)
Owens Owens	Draw (15:00)	Kagetsu; Wolf (9:44)	Owens; Owens (10:06)	—N/a

Final (November 11, 2016)
Blue	Kairi Hojo and Yoko Bito	Pin
Red	Io Shirai and Mayu Iwatani	18:54

== 2017 ==
Goddesses of Stardom Tag League
- 2017

Tournament information
- Sport: Professional wrestling
- Location: Japan
- Dates: October 14, 2017–November 12, 2017
- Tournament format: Round-robin
- Host: World Wonder Ring Stardom
- Participants: 8

Final positions
- Champions: Bea Priestley and Kelly Klein
- Runner-up: Jungle Kyona and Yoko Bito

Tournament statistics
- Matches played: 17

The 2017 edition of the event extended over five days, starting with October 14 and culminating on November 12, 2017.

Final standings
Blue Goddess Block		Red Goddess Block	
Bea Priestley and Kelly Klein	7	Yoko Bito and Jungle Kyona	5
Io Shirai and HZK	5	Oedo Tai (Hana Kimura and Kagetsu)	5
Hiromi Mimura and Konami	4	Chardonnay and Scarlett	4
Natsuko Tora and Shiki Shibusawa	2	Starlight Kid and AZM	0

Blue Red	HZK Shirai	Klein Priestley	Konami Mimura	Shibusawa Tora
AZM Kid	HZK; Shirai (7:22)	Klein; Priestley (5:13)	Konami; Mimura (8:12)	Shibusawa; Tora (5:17)
Bito Kyona	HZK; Shirai (13:02)	Draw (15:00)	Bito; Kyona (4:05)	Bito; Kyona (8:26)
Chardonnay Scarlett	Chardonnay; Scarlett (9:50)	Klein; Priestley (9:15)	Konami; Mimura (9:57)	Chardonnay; Scarlett (9:41)
Kagetsu Kimura	Draw (15:00)	Klein; Priestley (11:25)	Kagetsu; Kimura (11:45)	Kagetsu; Kimura (9:19)

Final (November 5, 2017)
Blue	Bea Priestley and Kelly Klein	Pin
Red	Yoko Bito and Jungle Kyona	12:19

== 2018 ==
Goddesses of Stardom Tag League
- 2018

Tournament information
- Sport: Professional wrestling
- Location: Japan
- Dates: October 13, 2018–November 4, 2018
- Tournament format: Two-block round-robin
- Host: World Wonder Ring Stardom
- Participants: 12

Final positions
- Champions: Momo Watanabe and Utami Hayashishita
- Runner-up: Queen's Quest (Bea Priestley and Chardonnay)

Tournament statistics
- Matches played: 31

The 2018 edition of the event extended over six days, starting with October 13 and culminating on November 4, 2018.

Final standings
Blue Goddess Block		Red Goddess Block	
Momo Watanabe and Utami Hayashishita	8	Queen's Quest (Bea Priestley and Chardonnay)	7
Hana Kimura and Mary Apache	8	Oedo Tai (Kagetsu and Hazuki)	6
Stars (Mayu Iwatani and Saki Kashima)	7	J.A.N. (Jungle Kyona and Natsuko Tora)	6
Stars (Natsumi and Starlight Kid)	5	Queen's Quest (AZM and Konami)	4
J.A.N. (Kaori Yoneyama and Ruaka)	2	Oedo Tai (Martina and Sumire Natsu)	4
Sunshine Girls (Hanan and Leo Onozaki)	0	Stars (Shiki Shibusawa and Tam Nakano)	3

Blue Goddess	Apache Kimura	Hanan Onozaki	Hayashishita Watanabe	Iwatani Kashima	Kid Natsumi	Ruaka Yoneyama
Apache Kimura	—N/a	Apache; Kimura (8:40)	Hayashishita; Watanabe (9:53)	Apache; Kimura (9:29)	Apache; Kimura (6:42)	Apache; Kimura (7:40)
Hanan Onozaki	Apache; Kimura (8:40)	—N/a	Hayashishita; Watanabe (5:59)	Iwatani; Kashima (4:31)	Kid; Natsumi (5:28)	Ruaka; Yoneyama (4:43)
Hayashishita Watanabe	Hayashishita; Watanabe (9:53)	Hayashishita; Watanabe (5:59)	—N/a	Iwatani; Kashima (12:58)	Hayashishita; Watanabe (7:02)	Hayashishita; Watanabe (5:37)
Iwatani Kashima	Apache; Kimura (9:29)	Iwatani; Kashima (4:31)	Iwatani; Kashima (12:58)	—N/a	Draw (15:00)	Iwatani; Kashima (7:14)
Kid Natsumi	Apache; Kimura (6:42)	Kid; Natsumi (5:28)	Hayashishita; Watanabe (7:02)	Draw (15:00)	—N/a	Kid; Natsumi (6:31)
Ruaka Yoneyama	Apache; Kimura (7:40)	Ruaka; Yoneyama (4:43)	Hayashishita; Watanabe (5:37)	Iwatani; Kashima (7:14)	Kid; Natsumi (6:31)	—N/a
Red Goddess	AZM Konami	Chardonnay Priestley	Hazuki Kagetsu	Kyona Tora	Martina Sumire	Nakano Shibusawa
AZM Konami	—N/a	Chardonnay; Priestley (7:35)	AZM; Konami (12:03)	Kyona; Tora (7:42)	Martina; Sumire (9:15)	AZM; Konami (7:33)
Chardonnay Priestley	Chardonnay; Priestley (7:35)	—N/a	Hazuki; Kagetsu (10:45)	Draw (15:00)	Chardonnay; Priestley (9:40)	Chardonnay; Priestley (8:25)
Hazuki Kagetsu	AZM; Konami (12:03)	Hazuki; Kagetsu (10:45)	—N/a	Hazuki; Kagetsu (13:06)	Martina; Sumire (8:10)	Hazuki; Kagetsu (9:40)
Kyona Tora	Kyona; Tora (7:42)	Draw (15:00)	Hazuki; Kagetsu (13:06)	—N/a	Kyona; Tora (8:49)	Draw (7:56)
Martina Sumire	Martina; Sumire (9:15)	Chardonnay; Priestley (9:40)	Martina; Sumire (8:10)	Kyona; Tora (8:49)	—N/a	Nakano; Shibusawa (11:11)
Nakano Shibusawa	AZM; Konami (7:33)	Chardonnay; Priestley (8:25)	Hazuki; Kagetsu (9:40)	Draw (7:56)	Nakano; Shibusawa (11:11)	—N/a

Final (November 4, 2018)
Blue	Momo Watanabe and Utami Hayashishita	Pin
Red	Bea Priestley and Chardonnay	8:35

== 2019 ==
Goddesses of Stardom Tag League
- 2019

Tournament information
- Sport: Professional wrestling
- Location: Japan
- Dates: October 19, 2019–November 15, 2019
- Tournament format: Two-block round-robin
- Host: World Wonder Ring Stardom
- Participants: 12

Final positions
- Champions: DREAM SHiNE
- Runner-up: Bea Priestley and Jamie Hayter

Tournament statistics
- Matches played: 31

The 2019 edition of the event extended over five days, starting with October 19 and culminating on November 15, 2019. The third day of the tournament which was held in Osaka, was the only day that consisted of an afternoon and an evening show.

Final standings
Blue Goddess Block		Red Goddess Block	
Bea Priestley and Jamie Hayter	10	DREAM SHiNE (Arisa Hoshiki and Tam Nakano)	8
Queen's Quest (Momo Watanabe and AZM)	6	Tokyo Cyber Squad (Death Yama-san and Hana Kimura)	8
Riho and Starlight Kid	5	Tokyo Cyber Squad (Bobbi Tyler and Zoe Lucas)	4
Oedo Tai (Hazuki and Natsuko Tora)	4	Oedo Tai (Andras Miyagi and Kagetsu)	4
Tokyo Cyber Squad (Jungle Kyona and Konami)	3	Oedo Tai (Martina and Sumire Natsu)	4
Stars (Mayu Iwatani and Saki Kashima)	2	3838 Tag (Saya Iida and Saya Kamitani)	2

Blue Goddess	Kyona Konami	Hazuki Tora	Priestley Hayter	Watanabe AZM	Riho Kid	Iwatani Kashima
Kyona Konami	—N/a	Hazuki; Tora (9:28)	Priestley; Hayter (9:51)	Watanabe; AZM (9:51)	Draw (15:00)	Kyona; Konami (11:29)
Hazuki Tora	Hazuki; Tora (9:28)	—N/a	Priestley; Hayter (12:27)	Watanabe; AZM (12:43)	Riho; Kid (10:19)	Hazuki; Tora (10:25)
Priestley Hayter	Priestley; Hayter (9:51)	Priestley; Hayter (12:27)	—N/a	Priestley; Hayter (9:06)	Priestley; Hayter (6:53)	Priestley; Hayter (7:38)
Watanabe AZM	Watanabe; AZM (9:51)	Watanabe; AZM (12:43)	Priestley; Hayter (9:06)	—N/a	Watanabe; AZM (10:06)	Iwatani; Kashima (10:23)
Riho Kid	Draw (15:00)	Riho; Kid (10:19)	Priestley; Hayter (6:53)	Watanabe; AZM (10:06)	—N/a	Riho; Kid (12:12)
Iwatani Kashima	Kyona; Konami (11:29)	Hazuki; Tora (10:25)	Priestley; Hayter (7:38)	Iwatani; Kashima (10:23)	Riho; Kid (12:12)	—N/a
Red Goddess	Iida Kamitani	Tyler Lucas	Yama-san Kimura	Miyagi Kagetsu	Hoshiki Nakano	Martina Sumire
Iida Kamitani	—N/a	Tyler; Lucas (6:43)	Yama-san; Kimura (6:38)	Iida; Kamitani (5:02)	Hoshiki; Nakano (7:09)	Martina; Sumire (7:27)
Tyler Lucas	Tyler; Lucas (6:43)	—N/a	Yama-san; Kimura (5:25)	Tyler; Lucas (3:26)	Hoshiki; Nakano (8:38)	Martina; Sumire (6:12)
Yama-san Kimura	Yama-san; Kimura (6:38)	Yama-san; Kimura (5:25)	—N/a	Yama-san; Kimura (6:46)	Hoshiki; Nakano (5:41)	Yama-san; Kimura (5:53)
Miyagi Kagetsu	Iida; Kamitani (5:02)	Tyler; Lucas (3:26)	Yama-san; Kimura (6:46)	—N/a	Miyagi; Kagetsu (7:32)	Miyagi; Kagetsu (3:44)
Hoshiki Nakano	Hoshiki; Nakano (7:09)	Hoshiki; Nakano (8:38)	Hoshiki; Nakano (5:41)	Miyagi; Kagetsu (7:32)	—N/a	Hoshiki; Nakano (8:25)
Martina Sumire	Martina; Sumire (7:27)	Martina; Sumire (6:12)	Yama-san; Kimura (5:53)	Miyagi; Kagetsu (3:44)	Hoshiki; Nakano (8:25)	—N/a

Final (November 15, 2019)
Blue	Bea Priestley and Jamie Hayter	Pin
Red	Arisa Hoshiki and Tam Nakano	13:33

== 2020 ==
Goddesses of Stardom Tag League
- 2020

Tournament information
- Sport: Professional wrestling
- Location: Japan
- Dates: October 10, 2020–November 8, 2020
- Tournament format: Round-robin
- Host: World Wonder Ring Stardom
- Participants: 10

Final positions
- Champions: MOMOAZ
- Runner-up: Crazy Bloom

Tournament statistics
- Matches played: 26

The 2020 edition of the tournament was the tenth edition. It extended over nine days and took place starting with October 10 and culminating on November 8, 2020. The stipulation of the competition was that each team from both blocks would wrestle the teams in the other block rather than those from their own. The entire event portraited members of the active stables in the promotion, Donna Del Mondo, Queen's Quest, Oedo Tai and STARS wrestling under various combinations of sub-groups.

The winners of the tournament were AZM and Momo Watanabe who defeated Giulia and Maika in the finals.

=== Results ===
==== Overview ====
Final standings
Blue Goddess Block		Red Goddess Block	
MOMOAZ (AZM and Watanabe)	8	Crazy Bloom (Giulia and Maika)	6
Oedo Tai/Black Widows (Bea Priestley and Konami)	7	AphrOditE (Utami Hayashishita and Saya Kamitani)	5
Grab The Top (Himeka and Syuri)	6	Oedo Tai/Devil Duo (Natsuko Tora and Saki Kashima)	4
Dream H (Tam Nakano and Mina Shirakawa)	4	MK☆Sisters (Mayu Iwatani and Starlight Kid)	4
Color Me Pop (Riho and Gokigen Death)	2	wing★gori (Hanan and Saya Iida)	2

Blue Red	AZM Watanabe	Priestley Konami	Himeka Syuri	Nakano Shirawaka	Riho Death
Giulia Maika	Giulia; Maika (14:54)	Priestley; Konami (12:45)	Giulia; Maika (12:30)	Giulia; Maika (15:11)	Riho; Death (8:47)
Hayashishita Kamitani	AZM; Watanabe (15:02)	Draw (20:00)	Himeka; Syuri (14:43)	Hayashishita; Kamitani (14:06)	Hayashishita; Kamitani (8:43)
Tora Kashima	AZM; Watanabe (9:13)	Tora; Kashima (8:05)	Himeka; Syuri (10:45)	Nakano; Shirakawa (12:04)	Tora; Kashima (8:25)
Iwatani Kid	AZM; Watanabe (11:30)	Priestley; Konami (8:27)	Iwatani; Kid (15:06)	Iwatani; Kid (14:49)	Riho; Death (9:54)
Hanan Iida	AZM; Watanabe (8:17)	Prisetley; Konami (7:50)	Himeka; Syuri (10:55)	Nakano; Shirakawa (11:48)	Hanan; Iida (5:46)

Final (November 8, 2020)
Blue	AZM and Momo Watanabe	Pin
Red	Giulia and Maika	12:30

==== Night 1 ====
The first night took place on October 10, 2020.

No.	Results	Stipulations	Times
1	Saki Kashima defeated Mina Shirakawa	Singles match	6:35
2	Himeka defeated Natsuko Tora via disqualification	Singles match	7:02
3	Donna Del Mondo (Natsupoi and Syuri) defeated Stars (Saya Iida and Tam Nakano)	Goddesses of Stardom Tag League group stage match	10:38
4	Color Me Pop (Riho and Gokigen Death) defeated Stars (Mayu Iwatani and Starlight Kid)	Goddesses of Stardom Tag League group stage match	9:54
5	Oedo Tai (Bea Priestley and Konami) vs. Queen's Quest (Utami Hayashishita and Saya Kamitani) ended into a time-limit draw	Goddesses of Stardom Tag League group stage match	20:00
6	Donna Del Mondo (Giulia and Maika) defeated Queen's Quest (AZM and Watanabe)	Goddesses of Stardom Tag League group stage match	14:54

==== Night 2 ====
The second night took place on October 11, 2020.

No.	Results	Stipulations	Times
1	Donna Del Mondo (Natsupoi, Giulia and Maika) defeated Gokigen Death, Riho and Rina	Six-woman tag team match	9:44
2	Queen's Quest (AZM and Watanabe) defeated Stars (Saya Iida and Hanan)	Singles match	8:17
3	Oedo Tai (Bea Priestley and Konami) defeated Stars (Mayu Iwatani and Starlight Kid)	Goddesses of Stardom Tag League group stage match	8:27
4	Dream H (Mina Shirakawa and Tam Nakano) defeated Oedo Tai (Natsuko Tora and Saki Kashima)	Goddesses of Stardom Tag League group stage match	12:04
5	Donna Del Mondo (Himeka and Syuri) defeated Queen's Quest (Utami Hayashishita and Saya Kamitani)	Goddesses of Stardom Tag League group stage match	14:43

==== Night 3 ====
The third night took place on October 17, 2020.

No.	Results	Stipulations	Times
1	Utami Hayashishita defeated Saya Iida	Singles match	8:05
2	Konami defeated Saya Kamitani and Starlight Kid	Three-way match	7:21
3	Color Me Pop (Riho and Gokigen Death) defeated Donna Del Mondo (Giulia and Maika)	Goddesses of Stardom Tag League group stage match	8:47
4	Queen's Quest (AZM and Watanabe) defeated Oedo Tai (Natsuko Tora and Saki Kashima)	Goddesses of Stardom Tag League group stage match	9:13
5	Donna Del Mondo (Himeka, Natsupoi and Syuri) defeated Mina Shirakawa and STARS (Mayu Iwatani and Tam Nakano)	Six-woman tag team match	15:49

==== Night 4 ====
The fourth night took place on October 18, 2020.

No.	Results	Stipulations	Times
1	Hina and STARS (Gokigen Death and Rina) defeated Riho and STARS (Hanan and Starlight Kid)	Six-woman tag team match	6:31
2	Tam Nakano defeated Saya Iida	Singles match	10:21
3	Himeka defeated Mina Shirakawa	Singles match	7:58
4	Donna Del Mondo (Giulia, Natsupoi, Syuri and Maika) vs. Oedo Tai (Bea Priestley, Konami, Natsuko Tora and Saki Kashima) ended into a time-limit draw	Eight-woman tag team match	20:00
5	Queen's Quest (AZM and Watanabe) defeated Queen's Quest (Utami Hayashishita and Saya Kamitani)	Goddesses of Stardom Tag League group stage match	15:02
6	Mayu Iwatani (c) defeated Takumi Iroha	Singles match for the World of Stardom Championship	22:22
(c) / – the champion(s) heading into the match

==== Night 5 ====
The fifth night took place on October 25, 2020.

No.	Results	Stipulations	Times
1	Oedo Tai (Konami and Saki Kashima) defeated Stars (Gokigen Death and Rina)	Tag team match	8:19
2	Donna Del Mondo (Giulia and Maika) defeated Hina and Riho	Singles match	12:10
3	Donna Del Mondo (Himeka and Syuri) defeated STARS (Hanan and Saya Iida)	Goddesses of Stardom Tag League group stage match	10:55
4	Queen's Quest (Momo Watanabe and Utami Hayashishita) defeated Oedo Tai (Bea Priestley and Natsuko Tora) by disqualification	Eight-woman tag team match	14:15
5	STARS (Mayu Iwatani and Starlight Kid) defeated STARS (Mina Shirakawa and Tam Nakano)	Goddesses of Stardom Tag League group stage match	14:49

==== Night 6 ====
The sixth night took place on October 29, 2020.

No.	Results	Stipulations	Times
1	Rina defeated Gokigen Death, Hina, Ruaka and Saki Kashima	Five-way match	5:19
2	STARS (Mina Shirakawa and Tam Nakano) defeated STARS (Hanan and Saya Iida)	Goddesses of Stardom Tag League group stage match	11:48
3	Queen's Quest (Momo Watanabe and Utami Hayashishita) and Riho defeated Oedo Tai (Bea Priestley, Konami and Natsuko Tora) by disqualification	Six-woman tag team match	9:35
4	Maika (c) defeated Saya Kamitani	Singles match for the Future of Stardom Championship	11:18
5	Donna Del Mondo (Natsupoi and Syuri) defeated STARS (Mayu Iwatani and Starlight Kid)	Tag team match	13:20
6	Giulia (c) defeated Himeka	Singles match for the Wonder of Stardom Championship	19:47
(c) / – the champion(s) heading into the match

==== Night 7 ====
The seventh night took place on November 3, 2020.

No.	Results	Stipulations	Times
1	Rina defeated AZM, Natsupoi and Ruaka	Four-way match	4:56
2	Queen's Quest (Saya Kamitani and Utami Hayashishita) defeated Queen's Quest (Hina and Momo Watanabe)	Tag team match	9:25
3	Oedo Tai (Bea Priestley and Konami) defeated wing★gori (Hanan and Saya Iida)	Goddesses of Stardom Tag League group stage match	7:50
4	Oedo Tai (Natsuko Tora and Saki Kashima) defeated Gokigen Death and Riho	Goddesses of Stardom Tag League group stage match	8:25
5	Donna Del Mondo (Giulia and Maika) defeated Dream H (Mina Shirakawa and Tam Nakano)	Goddesses of Stardom Tag League group stage match	15:11
6	MK☆Sisters (Mayu Iwatani and Starlight Kid) defeated Donna Del Mondo (Himeka and Syuri)	Goddesses of Stardom Tag League group stage match	15:06

==== Night 8 ====
The eighth night took place on November 7, 2020.

No.	Results	Stipulations	Times
1	Hanan defeated Rina	Singles match	4:20
2	Starlight Kid defeated Ruaka and Saya Iida	Three-way match	6:04
3	Stars (Mayu Iwatani, Mina Shirakawa and Tam Nakano) defeated Queen's Quest (AZM, Hina and Momo Watanabe)	Six-woman tag team match	11:21
4	Queen's Quest (Saya Kamitani and Utami Hayashishita) defeated Gokigen Death and Riho	Goddesses of Stardom Tag League group stage match	8:43
5	Donna Del Mondo (Himeka and Syuri) defeated Oedo Tai (Natsuko Tora and Saki Kashima)	Goddesses of Stardom Tag League group stage match	10:45
6	Oedo Tai (Bea Priestley and Konami) defeated Donna Del Mondo (Giulia and Maika)	Goddesses of Stardom Tag League group stage match	12:45

==== Night 9 ====
The ninth and final night took place on November 8, 2020.

No.	Results	Stipulations	Times
1	wing★gori (Hanan and Saya Iida) defeated Gokigen Death and Riho	Goddesses of Stardom Tag League group stage match	5:46
2	Oedo Tai (Natsuko Tora and Saki Kashima) defeated Oedo Tai (Bea Priestley and Konami)	Goddesses of Stardom Tag League group stage match	8:05
3	Queen's Quest (Saya Kamitani and Utami Hayashishita) defeated Dream H (Mina Shirakawa and Tam Nakano)	Goddesses of Stardom Tag League group stage match	14:06
4	Queen's Quest (AZM and Momo Watanabe) defeated MK☆Sisters (Mayu Iwatani and Starlight Kid)	Goddesses of Stardom Tag League group stage match	11:30
5	Donna Del Mondo (Giulia and Maika) defeated Donna Del Mondo (Himeka and Syuri)	Goddesses of Stardom Tag League group stage match	14:07
6	Queen's Quest (AZM and Momo Watanabe) defeated Donna Del Mondo (Giulia and Maika)	Goddesses of Stardom Tag League final match	12:30

== 2021 ==
Goddesses of Stardom Tag League
- 2021

Tournament information
- Sport: Professional wrestling
- Location: Japan
- Dates: October 17, 2021–November 14, 2021
- Tournament format: Two-block round-robin
- Host: World Wonder Ring Stardom
- Participants: 12

Final positions
- Champions: Fukuoka Double Crazy
- Runner-up: MOMOAZ

Tournament statistics
- Matches played: 31

The 2021 edition of the tournament took place starting with October 17 and culminated on November 14, 2021. The participants were announced in a press conference held on October 13 and broadcast on Stardom's YouTube channel which was also for the matches of the Kawasaki Super Wars pay-per-view from November 3 which took place during the tag league.

=== Results ===
==== Overview ====
Final Standings
Blue Goddess Block		Red Goddess Block	
MOMOAZ (AZM and Momo Watanabe)	7	Stars/FWC (Hazuki and Koguma)	7
Blue MaRine (Mayu Iwatani and Rin Kadokura)	7	AphrOditE (Utami Hayashishita and Saya Kamitani)	7
Kurotora Kaidou (Starlight Kid and Ruaka)	7	Himepoi '21 (Himeka and Natsupoi)	6
Ponytail and Samurai Road (Syuri and Maika)	6	You’re the Eel, You’re the Bread (Unagi Sayaka and Mai Sakurai)	4
Dream H (Tam Nakano and Mina Shirakawa)	3	I love HigashiSpo! (Saki Kashima and Fukigen Death)	4
C Moon (Lady C and Waka Tsukiyama)	0	Water & Oil (Hanan and Rina)	2

Blue Goddess Block	AZM Watanabe	Syuri Maika	Kid Ruaka	Nakano Shirawaka	Iwatani Kadokura	Lady C Tsukiyama
AZM Watanabe	—N/a	Syuri; Maika (15:07)	Draw (20:00)	AZM; Watanabe (13:58)	Draw (20:00)	AZM; Watanabe (7:17)
Syuri Maika	Syuri; Maika (15:07)	—N/a	Kid; Ruaka (8:01)	Syuri; Maika (13:35)	Iwatani; Kadokura (13:42)	Syuri; Maika (8:23)
Kid Ruaka	Draw (20:00)	Kid; Ruaka (8:01)	—N/a	Kid; Ruaka (13:01)	Iwatani; Kadokura (11:51)	Kid; Ruaka (10:52)
Nakano Shirawaka	AZM; Watanabe (13:58)	Syuri; Maika (13:35)	Kid; Ruaka (13:01)	—N/a	Draw (20:00)	Nakano; Shirakawa (7:46)
Iwatani Kadokura	Iwatani; Kadokura (13:42)	Draw (20:00)	Iwatani; Kadokura (11:51)	Draw (20:00)	—N/a	Iwatani; Kadokura (10:13)
Lady C Tsukiyama	AZM; Watanabe (7:17)	Syuri; Maika (8:23)	Kid; Ruaka (10:52)	Nakano; Shirakawa (7:46)	Iwatani; Kadokura (10:13)	—N/a
Red Goddess Block	Hayashishita Kamitani	Himeka Natsupoi	Hazuki Koguma	Sayaka Sakurai	Kashima Death	Hanan Rina
Hayashishita Kamitani	—N/a	Hayashishita; Kamitani (9:54)	Draw (20:00)	Hayashishita; Kamitani (10:57)	Kashima; Death (8:19)	Hayashishita; Kamitani (9:41)
Himeka Natsupoi	Hayashishita; Kamitani (9:54)	—N/a	Himeka; Natsupoi (13:12)	Sayaka; Sakurai (9:56)	Himeka; Natsupoi (7:22)	Himeka; Natsupoi (7:07)
Hazuki Koguma	Draw (20:00)	Himeka; Natsupoi (13:12)	—N/a	Hazuki; Koguma (13:11)	Hazuki; Koguma (3:48)	Hazuki; Koguma (11:02)
Sayaka Sakurai	Hayashishita; Kamitani (10:57)	Sayaka; Sakurai (9:56)	Hazuki; Koguma (13:11)	—N/a	Sayaka; Sakurai (6:41)	Hanan; Rina (5:19)
Kashima Death	Kashima; Death (8:19)	Himeka; Natsupoi (7:22)	Hazuki; Koguma (3:48)	Sayaka; Sakurai (6:41)	—N/a	Kashima; Death (5:44)
Hanan Rina	Hayashishita; Kamitani (9:41)	Himeka; Natsupoi (7:07)	Hazuki; Koguma (11:02)	Hanan; Rina (5:19)	Kashima; Death (5:44)	—N/a

Final (November 14, 2021)
Blue	Hazuki and Koguma	Pin
Red	AZM and Momo Watanabe	15:28

==== Night 1 ====
The first night took place on October 17, 2021.

No.	Results	Stipulations	Times
1	Donna Del Mondo (Himeka and Natsupoi) defeated Cosmc Angels (Unagi Sayaka and Waka Tsukiyama)	Tag team match	10:12
2	Mayu Iwatani defeated Lady C	Singles match	7:07
3	FWC (Hazuki and Koguma) defeated Water & Oil (Hanan and Rina)	Goddesses of Stardom Tag League group stage match	11:02
4	I love HigashiSpo! (Saki Kashima and Fukigen Death) defeated AphroditE (Utami Hayashishita and Saya Kamitani)	Goddesses of Stardom Tag League group stage match	8:19
5	MOMOAZ (AZM and Momo Watanabe) vs. Kurotora Kaidou (Starlight Kid and Ruaka) ended in a time-limit draw	Goddesses of Stardom Tag League group stage match	20:00
6	Ponytail and Samurai Road (Syuri and Maika) defeated Dream H (Tam Nakano and Mina Shirakawa)	Goddesses of Stardom Tag League group stage match	13:35

==== Night 2 ====
The second night took place on October 30, 2021.

No.	Results	Stipulations	Times
1	Koguma defeated Mai Sakurai	Singles match	9:19
2	Hazuki vs. Unagi Sayaka ended in a time-limit draw	Singles match	15:00
3	MOMOAZ (AZM and Momo Watanabe) defeated C Moon (Lady C and Waka Tsukiyama)	Goddesses of Stardom Tag League group stage match	7:17
4	AphroditE (Utami Hayashishita and Saya Kamitani) defeated Water & Oil (Hanan and Rina)	Goddesses of Stardom Tag League group stage match	9:41
5	Kurotora Kaidou (Starlight Kid and Ruaka) defeated Dream H (Tam Nakano and Mina Shirakawa)	Goddesses of Stardom Tag League group stage match	13:01
6	Himepoi '21 (Himeka and Natsupoi) defeated I love HigashiSpo! (Saki Kashima and Fukigen Death)	Goddesses of Stardom Tag League group stage match	7:22
7	Blue MaRine (Mayu Iwatani and Rin Kadokura) defeated Ponytail and Samurai Road (Syuri and Maika)	Goddesses of Stardom Tag League group stage match	13:42

==== Night 3 ====
The third night took place on October 31, 2021.

No.	Results	Stipulations	Times
1	Oedo Tai (Ruaka and Saki Kashima) defeated Cosmic Angels (Mina Shirakawa and Waka Tsukiyama)	Tag team match	10:25
2	Tam Nakano defeated Lady C, Mayu Iwatani and Starlight Kid	Four-way match	10:57
3	AphroditE (Utami Hayashishita and Saya Kamitani) defeated Cosmic Angels (Unagi Sayaka and Mai Sakurai)	Goddesses of Stardom Tag League group stage match	10:57
4	Ponytail and Samurai Road (Syuri and Maika) defeated MOMOAZ (AZM and Momo Watanabe)	Goddesses of Stardom Tag League group stage match	15:07
5	Himepoi '21 (Himeka and Natsupoi) defeated FWC (Hazuki and Koguma)	Goddesses of Stardom Tag League group stage match	13:12

==== Kawasaki Super Wars ====
A tournament match took place at Kawasaki Super Wars on November 3, 2021.

No.	Results	Stipulations	Times
1	I love HigashiSpo! (Saki Kashima and Fukigen Death) defeated Oil & Water (Hanan and Rina)	Goddesses of Stardom Tag League group stage match	5:44

==== Night 4 ====
The fourth night took place on November 4, 2021.

No.	Results	Stipulations	Times
1	Himepoi '21 (Himeka and Natsupoi) defeated Water & Oil (Hanan and Rina)	Goddesses of Stardom Tag League group stage match	7:07
2	Cosmc Angels (Unagi Sayaka and Waka Tsukiyama) defeated I love HigashiSpo! (Saki Kashima and Fukigen Death)	Goddesses of Stardom Tag League group stage match	6:41
3	Ponytail and Samurai Road (Syuri and Maika) defeated C Moon (Lady C and Waka Tsukiyama)	Goddesses of Stardom Tag League group stage match	8:23
4	MOMOAZ (AZM and Momo Watanabe) defeated Dream H (Tam Nakano and Mina Shirakawa)	Goddesses of Stardom Tag League group stage match	13:58
5	Blue MaRine (Mayu Iwatani and Rin Kadokura) defeated Kurotora Kaidou (Starlight Kid and Ruaka)	Goddesses of Stardom Tag League group stage match	11:51
6	AphroditE (Utami Hayashishita and Saya Kamitani) vs. FWC (Hazuki and Koguma) ended in a time-limit draw	Goddesses of Stardom Tag League group stage match	20:00

==== Night 5 ====
The fifth night took place on November 6, 2021.

No.	Results	Stipulations	Times
1	Kurotora Kaidou (Starlight Kid and Ruaka) defeated C Moon (Lady C and Waka Tsukiyama)	Goddesses of Stardom Tag League group stage match	10:52
2	Momo Watanabe defeated Saki Kashima	Singles match	7:50
3	Syuri vs. Saya Kamitani ended in a double count-out	Singles match	11:36
4	Cosmic Angels (Unagi Sayaka and Mai Sakurai) defeated Himepoi '21 (Himeka and Natsupoi)	Goddesses of Stardom Tag League group stage match	9:56
5	Stars (Hazuki and Koguma) defeated Queen's Quest (Utami Hayashishita and AZM)	Tag team match	12:40
6	Blue MaRine (Mayu Iwatani and Rin Kadokura) vs. Dream H (Tam Nakano and Mina Shirakawa) ended in a time-limit draw	Goddesses of Stardom Tag League group stage match	20:00

==== Night 6 ====
The sixth night took place on November 7, 2021.

No.	Results	Stipulations	Times
1	Momo Watanabe defeated Ruaka	Singles match	6:00
2	Cosmic Angels (Tam Nakano and Mina Shirakawa) defeated Oedo Tai (Saki Kashima and Starlight Kid)	Tag team match	8:53
3	Blue MaRine (Mayu Iwatani and Rin Kadokura) defeated C Moon (Lady C and Waka Tsukiyama)	Goddesses of Stardom Tag League group stage match	10:13
4	Stars/FWC (Note: Hazuki joined Stars on November 4, 2021, therefore acting as a subgroup of the stable with Koguma.) (Hazuki and Koguma) defeated Cosmic Angels (Unagi Sayaka and Mai Sakurai)	Goddesses of Stardom Tag League group stage match	13:11
5	Donna Del Mondo (Natsupoi, Himeka and Syuri) defeated Queen's Quest (Utami Hayashishita, Saya Kamitani and AZM)	Six-woman tag team match	13:20

==== Night 7 ====
The seventh and final night took place on November 14, 2021.

No.	Results	Stipulations	Times
1	Water & Oil (Hanan and Rina) defeated Cosmic Angels (Unagi Sayaka and Mai Sakurai)	Goddesses of Stardom Tag League group stage match	5:19
2	Stars/FWC (Hazuki and Koguma) defeated Oedo Tai (Saki Kashima and Fukigen Death)	Goddesses of Stardom Tag League group stage match	3:48
3	AphroditE (Utami Hayashishita and Saya Kamitani) defeated Himepoi '21 (Himeka and Natsupoi)	Goddesses of Stardom Tag League group stage match	9:54
4	Dream H (Tam Nakano and Mina Shirakawa) defeated C Moon (Lady C and Waka Tsukiyama)	Goddesses of Stardom Tag League group stage match	7:46
5	Kurotora Kaidou (Starlight Kid and Ruaka) defeated Ponytail and Samurai Road (Syuri and Maika) by disqualification	Goddesses of Stardom Tag League group stage match	8:01
6	Stars/FWC (Hazuki and Koguma) defeated AphroditE (Utami Hayashishita and Saya Kamitani)	Goddesses of Stardom Tag League finalists decision match	5:27
7	Stars/FWC (Hazuki and Koguma) defeated MOMOAZ (AZM and Momo Watanabe)	Goddesses of Stardom Tag League final match	15:28

== 2022 ==
Goddesses of Stardom Tag League
- 2022

Tournament information
- Sport: Professional wrestling
- Location: Japan
- Dates: October 23, 2022–December 4, 2022
- Tournament format: Two-block round-robin
- Host: World Wonder Ring Stardom
- Participants: 16

Final positions
- Champions: 7Upp
- Runner-up: AphrOditE

Tournament statistics
- Matches played: 57

The 2022 edition of the tournament took place starting on October 23 and culminated on December 4, 2022. It was the biggest tag league event to its date with sixteen teams entering it. The participants were announced in a press conference held on October 3 and broadcast on Stardom's YouTube channel.

=== Results ===
==== Overview ====
Final Standings
Blue Goddess Block		Red Goddess Block	
7Upp (Nanae Takahashi and Yuu)	11	AphrOditE (Utami Hayashishita and Saya Kamitani)	10
FWC (Hazuki and Koguma)	10	meltear (Tam Nakano and Natsupoi)	10
MaiHime (Maika and Himeka)	10	Black Desire (Momo Watanabe and Starlight Kid)	9
The New Eras (Mirai and Ami Sourei)	9	Karate Brave (Syuri and Tomoka Inaba)	9
BMI2000 (Natsuko Tora and Ruaka)	8	Mafia Bella (Giulia and Thekla)	8
02 line (AZM and Miyu Amasaki)	4	Peach☆Rock (Mayu Iwatani and Momo Kohgo)	6
Kawild Venus/WaKawild (Mina Shirakawa/Waka Tsukiyama (Note: Shirakawa sustained a broken jaw injury on November 3, 2022 at Hiroshima Goddess Festival event and has been replaced by Tsukiyama in the tournament ever since.) and Saki)	2	We Love Tokyo Sports (Saki Kashima and Fukigen Death)	4
wing★gori (Hanan and Saya Iida)	2	Mai Fair Lady (Mai Sakurai and Lady C)	0

Blue Goddess Block	Hazuki Koguma	Hanan Iida	Shirakawa/Tsukiyama Saki	AZM Amasaki	Maika Himeka	Tora Ruaka	Takahashi Yuu	Mirai Sourei
Hazuki Koguma	—N/a	Hazuki; Koguma (9:33)	Hazuki; Koguma (8:47)	Hazuki; Koguma (11:19)	Hazuki; Koguma (10:18)	Tora; Ruaka (7:03)	Takahashi; Yuu (12:00)	Hazuki; Koguma (10:20)
Hanan Iida	Hazuki; Koguma (9:33)	—N/a	Hanan; Iida (7:39)	AZM; Amasaki (7:49)	Maika; Himeka (8:48)	Tora; Ruaka (9:05)	Takahashi; Yuu (8:13)	Mirai; Sourei (9:13)
Shirakawa/Tsukiyama Saki	Hazuki; Koguma (8:47)	Hanan; Iida (7:39)	—N/a	AZM; Amasaki (6:22)	Maika; Himeka (5:50)	Shirakawa; Saki (10:32)	Takahashi; Yuu (7:24)	Mirai; Sourei (9:46)
AZM Amasaki	Hazuki; Koguma (11:19)	AZM; Amasaki (7:49)	AZM; Amasaki (6:22)	—N/a	Maika; Himeka (6:36)	Tora; Ruaka (9:32)	Takahashi; Yuu (7:14)	Mirai; Sourei (12:46)
Maika Himeka	Hazuki; Koguma (10:18)	Maika; Himeka (8:48)	Maika; Himeka (5:50)	Maika; Himeka (6:36)	—N/a	Tora; Ruaka (12:30)	Maika; Himeka (14:05)	Maika; Himeka (9:12)
Tora Ruaka	Tora; Ruaka (7:03)	Tora; Ruaka (9:05)	Shirakawa; Saki (10:32)	Tora; Ruaka (9:32)	Tora; Ruaka (12:30)	—N/a	Takahashi; Yuu (13:31)	Mirai; Sourei (9:39)
Takahashi Yuu	Takahashi; Yuu (12:00)	Takahashi; Yuu (8:13)	Takahashi; Yuu (7:24)	Takahashi; Yuu (7:14)	Maika; Himeka (14:05)	Takahashi; Yuu (13:31)	—N/a	Draw (15:00)
Mirai Sourei	Hazuki; Koguma (10:20)	Mirai; Sourei (9:13)	Mirai; Sourei (9:46)	Mirai; Sourei (12:46)	Maika; Himeka (9:12)	Mirai; Sourei (9:39)	Draw (15:00)	—N/a
Red Goddess Block	Iwatani Kohgo	Syuri Inaba	Nakano Natsupoi	Hayashishita Kamitani	Giulia Thekla	Kashima Death	Watanabe Kid	Sakurai Lady C
Iwatani Kohgo	—N/a	Syuri; Inaba (7:19)	Nakano; Natsupoi (8:34)	Hayashishita; Kamitani (9:36)	Iwatani; Kohgo (11:28)	Iwatani; Kohgo (5:57)	Watanabe; Kid (8:23)	Iwatani; Kohgo (7:39)
Syuri Inaba	Syuri; Inaba (7:19)	—N/a	Nakano; Natsupoi (12:08)	Syuri; Inaba (12:48)	Syuri; Inaba (14:08)	Kashima; Death (7:41)	Draw (15:00)	Syuri; Inaba (9:07)
Nakano Natsupoi	Nakano; Natsupoi (8:34)	Nakano; Natsupoi (12:08)	—N/a	Hayashishita; Kamitani (9:17)	Giulia; Thekla (10:53)	Nakano; Natsupoi (3:46)	Nakano; Natsupoi (9:54)	Nakano; Natsupoi (8:38)
Hayashishita Kamitani	Hayashishita; Kamitani (9:36)	Syuri; Inaba (12:48)	Hayashishita; Kamitani (9:17)	—N/a	Giulia; Thekla (11:52)	Hayashishita; Kamitani (5:14)	Hayashishita; Kamitani (13:42)	Hayashishita; Kamitani (8:21)
Giulia Thekla	Iwatani; Kohgo (11:28)	Syuri; Inaba (14:08)	Giulia; Thekla (10:53)	Giulia; Thekla (11:52)	—N/a	Giulia; Thekla (7:00)	Watanabe; Kid(8:22)	Giulia; Thekla (9:23)
Kashima Death	Iwatani; Kohgo (5:57)	Kashima; Death (7:41)	Nakano; Natsupoi (3:46)	Hayashishita; Kamitani (5:14)	Giulia; Thekla (7:00)	—N/a	Watanabe; Kid (5:47)	Kashima; Death (5:23)
Watanabe Kid	Watanabe; Kid (8:22)	Draw (15:00)	Nakano; Natsupoi (9:54)	Hayashishita; Kamitani (13:42)	Watanabe; Kid(8:22)	Watanabe; Kid (5:47)	—N/a	Watanabe; Kid (8:26)
Sakurai Lady C	Iwatani; Kohgo (7:39)	Syuri; Inaba (9:07)	Nakano; Natsupoi (8:38)	Hayashishita; Kamitani (8:21)	Giulia; Thekla (9:23)	Kashima; Death (5:23)	Watanabe; Kid (8:26)	—N/a

Final (December 4, 2022)
Blue	Nanae Takahashi and Yuu	Pin
Red	Utami Hayashishita and Saya Kamitani	20:08

==== Night 1 ====
The first night took place on October 23, 2022.

No.	Results	Stipulations	Times
1	Momo Kohgo defeated Waka Tsukiyama and Rina	Three-way match	4:39
2	Queen's Quest (Saya Kamitani and Hina) defeated Hazuki and Fuwa-chan	Tag team match	14:29
3	We Love Tokyo Sports (Saki Kashima and Fukigen Death) defeated Mai Fair Lady (Mai Sakurai and Lady C)	Goddesses of Stardom Tag League group stage match	5:23
4	Kawild Venus (Mina Shirakawa and Saki) defeated BMI2000 (Natsuko Tora and Ruaka) by disqualification	Goddesses of Stardom Tag League group stage match	10:32
5	02 line (AZM and Miyu Amasaki) defeated wing★gori (Hanan and Saya Iida)	Goddesses of Stardom Tag League group stage match	7:49
6	Karate Brave (Syuri and Tomoka Inaba) vs. Black Desire (Momo Watanabe and Starlight Kid) ended in a time-limit draw	Goddesses of Stardom Tag League group stage match	15:00
7	MaiHime (Maika and Himeka) defeated The New Eras (Mirai and Ami Sourei)	Goddesses of Stardom Tag League group stage match	9:12
8	Mafia Bella (Giulia and Thekla) defeated meltear (Tam Nakano and Natsupoi)	Goddesses of Stardom Tag League group stage match	10:53
9	7Upp (Nanae Takahashi and Yuu) defeated FWC (Hazuki and Koguma)	Goddesses of Stardom Tag League group stage match	12:00
10	Kairi defeated Jazzy Gabert	IWGP Women's Championship tournament semifinal match	12:24
11	Mayu Iwatani defeated Utami Hayashishita	IWGP Women's Championship tournament semifinal match	14:51

==== Night 2 ====
The second night took place on October 30, 2022.

No.	Results	Stipulations	Times
1	Mai Sakurai defeated Momo Kohgo	Singles match	6:32
2	BMI2000 (Natsuko Tora and Ruaka) defeated wing★gori (Hanan and Saya Iida)	Goddesses of Stardom Tag League group stage match	9:05
3	Mafia Bella (Giulia and Thekla) vs. meltear (Tam Nakano and Natsupoi) vs. MaiHime (Maika and Himeka) ended in a time-limit draw	Tag team match	15:00
4	FWC (Hazuki and Koguma) defeated 02 line (AZM and Miyu Amasaki)	Goddesses of Stardom Tag League group stage match	11:19
5	AphrOditE (Utami Hayashishita and Saya Kamitani) defeated We Love Tokyo Sports (Saki Kashima and Fukigen Death)	Goddesses of Stardom Tag League group stage match	5:14
6	God's Eye (Syuri, Mirai and Ami Sourei) defeated Oedo Tai (Starlight Kid, Momo Watanabe and Rina	Six-woman tag team match	16:00

==== Night 3 ====
The third night took place on November 5, 2022.

No.	Results	Stipulations	Times
1	Starlight Kid defeated Lady C and Ruaka	Three-way match	7:47
2	7Upp (Nanae Takahashi and Yuu) vs. The New Eras (Mirai & Ami Sourei) ended in a time-limit draw	Goddesses of Stardom Tag League group stage match	15:00
3	meltear (Tam Nakano and Natsupoi) defeated 02 line (AZM and Miyu Amasaki)	Tag team match	10:40
4	AphrOditE (Utami Hayashishita and Saya Kamitani) defeated Stars (Mayu Iwatani and Saya Iida)	Tag team match	8:24
5	FWC (Hazuki and Koguma) defeated Cosmic Angels (Saki and Waka Tsukiyama)	Goddesses of Stardom Tag League group stage match	8:47
6	Donna Del Mondo (Maika, Himeka and Mai Sakurai) defeated Oedo Tai (Natsuko Tora, Momo Watanabe and Saki Kashima) by disqualification	Six-woman tag team match	10:28
7	Karate Brave (Syuri and Tomoka Inaba) defeated Mafia Bella (Giulia and Thekla)	Goddesses of Stardom Tag League group stage match	14:08

==== Night 4 ====
The fourth night took place on November 6, 2022.

No.	Results	Stipulations	Times
1	Saki Kashima defeated Saya Kamitani, Waka Tsukiyama, and Miyu Amasaki	4-way match	5:32
2	Black Desire (Momo Watanabe and Starlight Kid) defeated Stars (Mayu Iwatani and Saya Iida)	Tag team match	7:26
3	Queen's Quest (Utami Hayashishita and AZM) vs. The New Eras (Mirai and Ami Sourei) vs. Donna Del Mondo (Maika and Himeka) ended in a time-limit draw	3-way tag team match	15:00
4	Mafia Bella (Giulia and Thekla) defeated Mai Fair Lady (Mai Sakurai and Lady C)	Goddesses of Stardom Tag League group stage match	9:23
5	BMI2000 (Natsuko Tora and Ruaka) defeated FWC (Hazuki and Koguma)	Goddesses of Stardom Tag League group stage match	7:03
6	meltear (Tam Nakano and Natsupoi) defeated Karate Brave (Syuri and Tomoka Inaba)	Goddesses of Stardom Tag League group stage match	12:08

==== Night 5 ====
The fifth night took place on November 12, 2022.

No.	Results	Stipulations	Times
1	Donna Del Mondo (Maika and Himeka) defeated wing★gori (Hanan and Saya Iida)	Goddesses of Stardom Tag League group stage match	8:48
2	BMI2000 (Natsuko Tora and Ruaka) defeated 02 line (AZM and Miyu Amasaki)	Goddesses of Stardom Tag League group stage match	9:32
3	The New Eras (Mirai and Ami Sourei) defeated Cosmic Angels (Saki and Waka Tsukiyama)	Goddesses of Stardom Tag League group stage match	9:46
4	Peach☆Rock (Mayu Iwatani and Momo Kohgo) defeated Mai Fair Lady (Mai Sakurai and Lady C)	Goddesses of Stardom Tag League group stage match	7:39
5	FWC (Hazuki and Koguma) vs. meltear (Tam Nakano and Natsupoi) vs. Karate Brave (Syuri and Tomoka Inaba) ended in a time-limit draw	3-way tag team match	15:00
6	Mafia Bella (Giulia and Thekla) defeated We Love Tokyo Sports (Saki Kashima and Fukigen Death)	Goddesses of Stardom Tag League group stage match	7:00
7	AphrOditE (Utami Hayashishita and Saya Kamitani) defeated Black Desire (Momo Watanabe and Starlight Kid)	Goddesses of Stardom Tag League group stage match	13:42

==== Night 6 ====
The sixth night took place on November 13, 2022.

No.	Results	Stipulations	Times
1	meltear (Tam Nakano and Natsupoi) defeated Black Desire (Momo Watanabe and Starlight Kid)	Goddesses of Stardom Tag League group stage match	9:54
2	wing★gori (Hanan and Saya Iida) defeated Cosmic Angels (Saki and Waka Tsukiyama)	Goddesses of Stardom Tag League group stage match	7:39
3	AphrOditE (Utami Hayashishita and Saya Kamitani) defeated Mai Fair Lady (Mai Sakurai and Lady C)	Goddesses of Stardom Tag League group stage match	8:21
4	Mafia Bella (Giulia and Thekla) defeated 02 line (AZM and Miyu Amasaki)	Tag team match	10:45
5	FWC (Hazuki and Koguma) vs. Karate Brave (Syuri and Tomoka Inaba) vs. The New Eras (Mirai and Ami Sourei) ended in a time-limit draw	3-way tag team match	15:00
6	AphrOditE (Utami Hayashishita and Saya Kamitani) defeated Peach☆Rock (Mayu Iwatani and Momo Kohgo)	Goddesses of Stardom Tag League group stage match	9:36
7	BMI2000 (Natsuko Tora and Ruaka) defeated MaiHime (Maika and Himeka)	Goddesses of Stardom Tag League group stage match	12:30

==== Gold Rush ====
Two tournament matches took place at Gold Rush on November 19, 2022.

No.	Results	Stipulations	Times
1	Black Desire (Momo Watanabe and Starlight Kid) defeated We Love Tokyo Sports (Saki Kashima and Fukigen Death)	Goddesses of Stardom Tag League group stage match	5:47
2	MaiHime (Maika and Himeka) defeated 7Upp (Nanae Takahashi and Yuu)	Goddesses of Stardom Tag League group stage match	14:05

==== Night 7 ====
The seventh night took place on November 23, 2022.

No.	Results	Stipulations	Times
1	FWC (Hazuki and Koguma) defeated wing★gori (Hanan and Saya Iida)	Goddesses of Stardom Tag League group stage match	9:33
2	MaiHime (Maika and Himeka) defeated 02 line (AZM and Miyu Amasaki)	Goddesses of Stardom Tag League group stage match	6:36
3	Black Desire (Momo Watanabe and Starlight Kid) defeated Mai Fair Lady (Mai Sakurai and Lady C)	Goddesses of Stardom Tag League group stage match	8:26
4	7Upp (Nanae Takahashi and Yuu) defeated Cosmic Angels (Saki and Waka Tsukiyama)	Goddesses of Stardom Tag League group stage match	7:24
5	meltear (Tam Nakano and Natsupoi) defeated We Love Tokyo Sports (Saki Kashima and Fukigen Death)	Goddesses of Stardom Tag League group stage match	3:46
6	Karate Brave (Syuri and Tomoka Inaba) defeated Peach☆Rock (Mayu Iwatani and Momo Kohgo)	Goddesses of Stardom Tag League group stage match	7:19
7	Mafia Bella (Giulia and Thekla) defeated AphrOditE (Utami Hayashishita and Saya Kamitani)	Goddesses of Stardom Tag League group stage match	11:52
8	The New Eras (Mirai and Ami Sourei) defeated BMI2000 (Natsuko Tora and Ruaka)	Goddesses of Stardom Tag League group stage match	9:39

==== Stardom in Showcase vol. 3 ====
A tournament match took place at Stardom in Showcase vol.3 on November 26, 2022.

No.	Results	Stipulations	Times
1	7Upp (Nanae Takahashi and Yuu) defeated wing★gori (Hanan and Saya Iida)	Goddesses of Stardom Tag League group stage match	8:13

==== Night 8 ====
The eighth night took place on November 27, 2022.

No.	Results	Stipulations	Times
1	MaiHime (Maika and Himeka) defeated Oedo Tai (Ruaka and Rina)	Tag team match	7:31
2	Oedo Tai (Natsuko Tora, Saki Kashima, Momo Watanabe and Starlight Kid) defeated Stars (Hazuki, Koguma, Saya Iida and Hanan)	Eight-woman tag team match	9:43
3	The New Eras (Mirai and Ami Sourei) defeated 02 line (AZM and Miyu Amasaki)	Goddesses of Stardom Tag League group stage match	12:46
4	meltear (Tam Nakano and Natsupoi) defeated Mai Fair Lady (Mai Sakurai and Lady C)	Goddesses of Stardom Tag League group stage match	8:38
5	Karate Brave (Syuri and Tomoka Inaba) defeated AphrOditE (Utami Hayashishita and Saya Kamitani)	Goddesses of Stardom Tag League group stage match	12:48
6	Peach☆Rock (Mayu Iwatani and Momo Kohgo) defeated Mafia Bella (Giulia and Thekla)	Goddesses of Stardom Tag League group stage match	11:28

==== Night 9 ====
The ninth night took place on December 3, 2022.

No.	Results	Stipulations	Times
1	Saya Kamitani defeated Utami Hayashishita, Giulia, Thekla, Mai Sakurai, Lady C, Hanan, Saya Iida, Natsuko Tora, Rina, and Ruaka	Stardom rambo	16:03
2	Black Desire (Momo Watanabe and Starlight Kid) defeated Peach☆Rock (Mayu Iwatani and Momo Kohgo)	Goddesses of Stardom Tag League group stage match	8:23
3	MaiHime (Maika and Himeka) defeated Cosmic Angels (Saki and Waka Tsukiyama)	Goddesses of Stardom Tag League group stage match	5:50
4	7Upp (Nanae Takahashi and Yuu) defeated 02 line (AZM and Miyu Amasaki)	Goddesses of Stardom Tag League group stage match	7:14
5	meltear (Tam Nakano and Natsupoi) defeated Peach☆Rock (Mayu Iwatani and Momo Kohgo)	Goddesses of Stardom Tag League group stage match	8:34
6	We Love Tokyo Sports (Saki Kashima and Fukigen Death) defeated Karate Brave (Syuri and Tomoka Inaba)	Goddesses of Stardom Tag League group stage match	7:41
7	FWC (Hazuki and Koguma) defeated The New Eras (Mirai and Ami Sourei)	Goddesses of Stardom Tag League group stage match	10:20

==== Night 10 ====
The tenth and final night took place on December 4, 2022.

No.	Results	Stipulations	Times
1	02line (AZM and Miyu Amasaki) defeated Cosmic Angels (Saki and Waka Tsukiyama)	Goddesses of Stardom Tag League group stage match	6:22
2	The New Eras (Mirai and Ami Sourei) defeated wing★gori (Hanan and Saya Iida)	Goddesses of Stardom Tag League group stage match	9:13
3	FWC (Hazuki and Koguma) defeated MaiHime (Maika and Himeka)	Goddesses of Stardom Tag League group stage match	10:18
4	7Upp (Nanae Takahashi and Yuu) defeated BMI2000 (Natsuko Tora and Ruaka)	Goddesses of Stardom Tag League group stage match	13:31
5	Karate Brave (Syuri and Tomoka Inaba) defeated Mai Fair Lady (Mai Sakurai and Lady C)	Goddesses of Stardom Tag League group stage match	9:07
6	Peach☆Rock (Mayu Iwatani and Momo Kohgo) defeated We Love Tokyo Sports (Saki Kashima and Fukigen Death)	Goddesses of Stardom Tag League group stage match	5:57
7	Black Desire (Momo Watanabe and Starlight Kid) defeated Mafia Bella (Giulia and Thekla)	Goddesses of Stardom Tag League group stage match	8:22
8	AphrOditE (Utami Hayashishita and Saya Kamitani) defeated meltear (Tam Nakano and Natsupoi)	Goddesses of Stardom Tag League group stage match	9:17
9	7Upp (Nanae Takahashi and Yuu) defeated AphrOditE (Utami Hayashishita and Saya Kamitani)	Goddesses of Stardom Tag League final match	20:08

== 2023 ==
Goddesses of Stardom Tag League
- 2023
- Promotional poster

Tournament information
- Sport: Professional wrestling
- Location: Japan
- Dates: October 15, 2023–November 12, 2023
- Tournament format: Two-block round-robin
- Host: World Wonder Ring Stardom
- Participants: 14

Final positions
- Champions: Divine Kingdom
- Runner-up: Crazy Star

Tournament statistics
- Matches played: 43

The 2023 edition of the tournament started on October 15 and culminated on November 12, 2023. Originally, each block was supposed to have eight tag teams, but at the press conference for the tournament only seven tag teams for each block were announced as both Natsupoi and Utami Hayashishita were out with cervical hernias. Yuna Mizumori would replace Natsupoi and team with Tam Nakano while Lady C would team with Yuna's original partner, Ami Sourei instead of Utami Hayashishita, and Momo Watanabe would replace Starlight Kid, who had an ankle injury, and team with Natsuko Tora instead of Ruaka.

=== Results ===
==== Overview ====
Current Standings
Blue Goddess Block		Red Goddess Block	
Divine Kingdom (Maika and Megan Bayne)	10	Crazy Star (Mei Seira and Suzu Suzuki)	9
Eye Contact (Mayu Iwatani and Hanan)	8	XL (Natsuko Tora and Momo Watanabe)	8
MiraiSaku (Mirai and Mai Sakurai)	8	Prominence (Risa Sera and Hiragi Kurumi)	8
02line (AZM and Miyu Amasaki)	6	Mafia Bella (Giulia and Thekla)	7
Reiwa Tokyo Towers (Ami Sourei and Lady C)	6	Anecon (Syuri and Saki Kashima)	4
FWC (Hazuki and Koguma)	4	Moonlight Venus (Mina Shirakawa and Waka Tsukiyama)	4
Cosmic Angels (Tam Nakano and Yuna Mizumori) (Note: Nakano pulled out due to injury during the competition but before starting having any match, therefore she and Mizumori forfeited all of the bouts.)	0	Maximum za Mini (Saya Iida and Hanako)	2

Blue Goddess Block	Maika Bayne	Iwatani Hanan	Hazuki Koguma	Mirai Sakurai	Nakano Mizumori	AZM Amasaki	Sourei Lady C
Maika Bayne	—N/a	Iwatani; Hanan (8:21)	Maika; Bayne (forfeit)	Maika; Bayne (10:12)	Maika; Bayne (forfeit)	Maika; Bayne (8:25)	Maika; Bayne (6:27)
Iwatani Hanan	Iwatani; Hanan (8:21)	—N/a	Hazuki; Koguma (12:47)	Iwatani; Hanan (10:56)	Iwatani; Hanan (forfeit)	Iwatani; Hanan (11:41)	Sourei; Lady C (11:11)
Hazuki Koguma	Maika; Bayne (forfeit)	Hazuki; Koguma (12:47)	—N/a	Mirai; Sakurai (10:01)	Hazuki; Koguma (forfeit)	AZM; Amasaki (8:41)	Sourei; Lady C (forfeit)
Mirai Sakurai	Maika; Bayne (10:12)	Iwatani; Hanan (10:56)	Mirai; Sakurai (10:01)	—N/a	Mirai; Sakurai (forfeit)	Mirai; Sakurai (12:27)	Mirai; Sakurai (14:12)
Nakano Mizumori	Maika; Bayne (forfeit)	Iwatani; Hanan (forfeit)	Hazuki; Koguma (forfeit)	Mirai; Sakurai (forfeit)	—N/a	AZM; Amasaki (forfeit)	Sourei; Lady C (forfeit)
AZM Amasaki	Maika; Bayne (8:25)	Iwatani; Hanan (11:41)	AZM; Amasaki (8:41)	Mirai; Sakurai (12:27)	AZM; Amasaki (forfeit)	—N/a	AZM; Amasaki (forfeit)
Sourei Lady C	Maika; Bayne (6:27)	Sourei; Lady C (11:11)	Sourei; Lady C (forfeit)	Mirai; Sakurai (14:12)	Sourei; Lady C (forfeit)	AZM; Amasaki (forfeit)	—N/a
Red Goddess Block	Giulia Thekla	Syuri Kashima	Suzuki Seira	Iida Hanako	Shirakawa Tsukiyama	Sera Kurumi	Tora Watanabe
Giulia Thekla	—N/a	Giulia; Thekla (12:13)	Suzuki; Seira (13:55)	Giulia; Thekla (10:33)	Giulia; Thekla (10:26)	Draw (15:00)	Tora; Watanabe (12:58)
Syuri Kashima	Giulia; Thekla (12:13)	—N/a	Suzuki; Seira (forfeit)	Syuri; Kashima (7:32)	Syuri; Kashima (11:07)	Sera; Kurumi (9:24)	Tora; Watanabe (10:03)
Suzuki Seira	Suzuki; Seira (13:55)	Suzuki; Seira (forfeit)	—N/a	Suzuki; Seira (9:50)	Suzuki; Seira (9:14)	Draw (15:00)	Tora; Watanabe (11:36)
Iida Hanako	Giulia; Thekla (10:33)	Syuri; Kashima (7:32)	Suzuki; Seira (9:50)	—N/a	Shirakawa; Tsukiyama (7:19)	Sera; Kurumi (9:53)	Iida; Hanako (11:27)
Shirakawa Tsukiyama	Giulia; Thekla (10:26)	Syuri; Kashima (11:07)	Suzuki; Seira (9:14)	Shirakawa; Tsukiyama (7:19)	—N/a	Sera; Kurumi (12:01)	Shirakawa; Tsukiyama (9:55)
Sera Kurumi	Draw (15:00)	Sera; Kurumi (9:24)	Draw (15:00)	Sera; Kurumi (9:53)	Sera; Kurumi (12:01)	—N/a	Tora; Watanabe (9:05)
Tora Watanabe	Tora; Watanabe (12:58)	Tora; Watanabe (10:03)	Tora; Watanabe (11:36)	Iida; Hanako (11:27)	Shirakawa; Tsukiyama (9:55)	Tora; Watanabe (9:05)	—N/a

Final (November 12, 2023)
Blue	Maika and Megan Bayne	Pin
Red	Mei Seira and Suzu Suzuki	15:47

==== Night 1 ====
The first night took place on October 15, 2023.

No.	Results	Stipulations	Times
1	MiraiSaku (Mirai and Mai Sakurai) defeated 02line (AZM and Miyu Amasaki) by forfeit (Note: AZM was unable to compete. The match was later resumed on November 3, 2023.)	Goddesses of Stardom Tag League Blue Goddess Block match	—
2^{P}	Ruaka defeated Yuna Mizumori	Singles match	5:56
3^{P}	Donna Del Mondo (Thekla and Mai Sakurai) defeated Mirai and Miyu Amasaki	Tag team match	7:33
4	Giulia defeated Michiko	Singles match	10:19
5	Crazy Star (Suzu Suzuki and Mei Seira) vs. Prominence (Risa Sera and Hiragi Kurumi) ended in a time-limit draw	Goddesses of Stardom Tag League Red Goddess Block match	15:00
6	Moonlight Venus (Mina Shirakawa and Waka Tsukiyama) defeated Maximum za Mini (Saya Iida and Hanako)	Goddesses of Stardom Tag League Red Goddess Block match	7:19
7	Divine Kingdom (Maika and Megan Bayne) defeated Reiwa Tokyo Towers (Ami Sourei and Lady C)	Goddesses of Stardom Tag League Blue Goddess Block match	6:27
8	XL (Natsuko Tora and Momo Watanabe) defeated Anecon (Syuri and Saki Kashima)	Goddesses of Stardom Tag League Red Goddess Block match	10:03
9	FWC (Hazuki and Koguma) defeated Eye Contact (Mayu Iwatani and Hanan)	Goddesses of Stardom Tag League Blue Goddess Block match	12:47
P / – the match was broadcast on the pre-show

==== Night 2 ====
The second night took place on October 19, 2023.

No.	Results	Stipulations	Times
1	XL (Natsuko Tora and Momo Watanabe) defeated Queen's Quest (Lady C and Miyu Amasaki)	Tag team match	8:27
2	Saori Anou defeated Mina Shirakawa, Ami Sourei and Ruaka	Four-way match	7:05
3	Anecon (Syuri and Saki Kashima) defeated Maximum za Mini (Saya Iida and Hanako)	Goddesses of Stardom Tag League Red Goddess Block match	7:32
4	Eye Contact (Mayu Iwatani and Hanan) defeated Divine Kingdom (Maika and Megan Bayne) by countout	Goddesses of Stardom Tag League Blue Goddess Block match	8:21
5	MiraiSaku (Mirai and Mai Sakurai) defeated FWC (Hazuki and Koguma)	Goddesses of Stardom Tag League Blue Goddess Block match	10:01
6	Crazy Star (Suzu Suzuki and Mei Seira) defeated Mafia Bella (Giulia and Thekla)	Goddesses of Stardom Tag League Red Goddess Block match	13:55

==== Night 3 ====
The third night took place on October 22, 2023.

No.	Results	Stipulations	Times
1	Lady C defeated Ruaka	Singles match	5:19
2	Divine Kingdom (Maika and Megan Bayne) defeated God's Eye (Ami Sourei and Saki Kashima)	Tag team match	5:23
3	Crazy Star (Suzu Suzuki and Mei Seira) defeated Maximum za Mini (Saya Iida and Hanako)	Goddesses of Stardom Tag League Red Goddess Block match	9:50
4	02line (AZM and Miyu Amasaki) defeated FWC (Hazuki and Koguma)	Goddesses of Stardom Tag League Blue Goddess Block match	8:41
5	Eye Contact (Mayu Iwatani and Hanan) defeated MiraiSaku (Mirai and Mai Sakurai)	Goddesses of Stardom Tag League Blue Goddess Block match	10:56
6	XL (Natsuko Tora and Momo Watanabe) defeated Mafia Bella (Giulia and Thekla)	Goddesses of Stardom Tag League Red Goddess Block match	12:58

==== Night 4 ====
The night took place on October 28, 2023.

No.	Results	Stipulations	Times
1	02line (AZM and Miyu Amasaki) defeated Reiwa Tokyo Towers (Ami Sourei and Lady C) by forfeit (Note: Sourei was absent due to personal reasons.)	Goddesses of Stardom Tag League Blue Goddess Block match	—
2	Thekla defeated Miyu Amasaki	Singles match	8:12
3	AZM defeated Ruaka	Singles match	7:29
4	Eye Contact (Mayu Iwatani and Hanan) defeated Mirai and Hanako	Tag team match	8:47
5	Anecon (Syuri and Saki Kashima) defeated Moonlight Venus (Mina Shirakawa and Waka Tsukiyama)	Goddesses of Stardom Tag League Red Goddess Block match	11:07
6	XL (Natsuko Tora and Momo Watanabe) defeated Donna Del Mondo (Maika and Mai Sakurai)	Tag team match	10:57
7	Suzu Suzuki, Megan Bayne and Mei Seira defeated Classmates (Hazuki, Koguma and Saya Iida)	Six-woman tag team match	11:47

==== Halloween Dark Night ====
A tournament match took place at Halloween Dark Night on October 29, 2023.

No.	Results	Stipulations	Times
1	Prominence (Risa Sera and Hiragi Kurumi) defeated Anecon (Syuri and Saki Kashima)	Goddesses of Stardom Tag League Red Goddess Block match	9:24

==== Night 5 ====
The fifth night took place on November 3, 2023.

No.	Results	Stipulations	Times
1	Maika defeated Ruaka and Hazuki	Three-way match	5:24
2	Eye Contact (Mayu Iwatani and Hanan) defeated Ami Sourei and Lady C	Tag team match	6:49
3	Anecon (Syuri and Saki Kashima) defeated Cosmic Angels (Saori Anou and Yuna Mizumori)	Tag team match	7:14
4	Mafia Bella (Giulia and Thekla) defeated Maximum za Mini (Saya Iida and Hanako)	Goddesses of Stardom Tag League Red Goddess Block match	10:33
5	MiraiSaku (Mirai and Mai Sakurai) defeated 02line (AZM and Miyu Amasaki)	Goddesses of Stardom Tag League Blue Goddess Block match	12:27
6	Prominence (Risa Sera and Hiragi Kurumi) defeated Moonlight Venus (Mina Shirakawa and Waka Tsukiyama)	Goddesses of Stardom Tag League Red Goddess Block match	12:01
7	Suzu Suzuki, Megan Bayne and Mei Seira defeated Oedo Tai (Natsuko Tora, Momo Watanabe and Fukigen Death)	Six-woman tag team match	11:02

==== Night 6 ====
The sixth night took place on November 4, 2023.

No.	Results	Stipulations	Times
1	Hazuki defeated Thekla and Rina	Three-way match	6:32
2	Oh Mai Giulia (Giulia and Mai Sakurai) defeated Oedo Tai (Fukigen Death and Ruaka)	Tag team match	6:49
3	Divine Kingdom (Maika and Megan Bayne) defeated Queen's Quest (Hina and Lady C) and Anecon (Syuri and Saki Kashima)	Three-way tag team match	7:14
4	The New Eras (Ami Sourei and Mirai) defeated Cosmic Angels (Saori Anou and Yuna Mizumori)	Tag team match	12:02
5	Maximum za Mini (Saya Iida and Hanako) defeated XL (Natsuko Tora and Momo Watanabe)	Goddesses of Stardom Tag League Red Goddess Block match	11:27
6	Crazy Star (Mei Seira and Suzu Suzuki) defeated Moonlight Venus (Mina Shirakawa and Waka Tsukiyama)	Goddesses of Stardom Tag League Red Goddess Block match	9:14
7	Eye Contact (Mayu Iwatani and Hanan) defeated 02line (AZM and Miyu Amasaki)	Goddesses of Stardom Tag League Blue Goddess Block match	11:41

==== Night 7 ====
The seventh night took place on November 5, 2023.

No.	Results	Stipulations	Times
1	Cosmic Angels (Saori Anou and Yuna Mizumori) defeated Stars (Hazuki and Saya Iida)	Tag team match	11:07
2	AZM defeated Rina, Hina, Ruaka and Hanako	Five-way match	8:35
3	Donna Del Mondo (Mai Sakurai, Maika) and Megan Bayne defeated God's Eye (Syuri, Mirai and Saki Kashima)	Six-woman tag team match	9:15
4	Mafia Bella (Giulia and Thekla) defeated Moonlight Venus (Mina Shirakawa and Waka Tsukiyama)	Goddesses of Stardom Tag League Red Goddess Block match	10:26
5	Reiwa Tokyo Towers (Ami Sourei and Lady C) defeated Eye Contact (Mayu Iwatani and Hanan)	Goddesses of Stardom Tag League Blue Goddess Block match	11:11
6	XL (Natsuko Tora and Momo Watanabe) defeated Crazy Star (Mei Seira and Suzu Suzuki)	Goddesses of Stardom Tag League Red Goddess Block match	11:36

==== Night 8 ====
The eighth night took place on November 10, 2023.

No.	Results	Stipulations	Times
1	Reiwa Tokyo Towers (Ami Sourei and Lady C) defeated FWC (Hazuki and Koguma) by forfeit (Note: Hazuki and Koguma pulled out due to the latter's injury.)	Goddesses of Stardom Tag League Blue Goddess Block match	—
2	Hazuki defeated Ruaka	Singles match	7:15
3	Mina Shirakawa defeated Saya Iida and Hanako	Three-way match	8:11
4	Crazy Star (Suzu Suzuki and Mei Seira) defeated Reiwa Tokyo Towers (Ami Sourei and Lady C)	Tag team match	7:40
5	MiraiSaku (Mirai and Mai Sakurai) defeated Cosmic Angels (Saori Anou and Yuna Mizumori)	Tag team match	11:04
6	Divine Kingdom (Maika and Megan Bayne) defeated 02line (AZM and Miyu Amasaki)	Goddesses of Stardom Tag League Blue Goddess Block match	8:25
7	XL (Natsuko Tora and Momo Watanabe) defeated Prominence (Risa Sera and Hiragi Kurumi)	Goddesses of Stardom Tag League Red Goddess Block match	9:05
8	Mafia Bella (Giulia and Thekla) defeated Anecon (Syuri and Saki Kashima)	Goddesses of Stardom Tag League Red Goddess Block match	12:13

==== Night 9 ====
The ninth night took place on November 11, 2023.

No.	Results	Stipulations	Times
1	Reiwa Tokyo Towers (Ami Sourei and Lady C) defeated Cosmic Angels (Tam Nakano and Yuna Mizumori by forfeit	Goddesses of Stardom Tag League Blue Goddess Block match	—
2	Rina defeated Mina Shirakawa, Yuna Mizumori and Hina	Four-way match	7:23
3	Oedo Tai (Natsuko Tora, Momo Watanabe and Ruaka) defeated Queen's Quest (AZM, Lady C and Miyu Amasaki)	Six-woman tag team match	8:46
4	Mafia Bella (Giulia and Thekla) defeated God's Eye (Syuri and Ami Sourei)	Tag team match	9:13
5	Suzu Suzuki vs. Mei Seira vs. Hazuki ended in a time-limit draw	Three-way match	15:00
6	Divine Kingdom (Maika and Megan Bayne) defeated MiraiSaku (Mirai and Mai Sakurai)	Goddesses of Stardom Tag League Blue Goddess Block match	10:12
7	Prominence (Risa Sera and Hiragi Kurumi) defeated Maximum za Mini (Saya Iida and Hanako)	Goddesses of Stardom Tag League Red Goddess Block match	9:53

==== Night 10 (Finals) ====
The tenth night took place on November 12, 2023.

No.	Results	Stipulations	Times
1	02line (AZM and Miyu Amasaki) defeated Cosmic Angels (Tam Nakano and Yuna Mizumori by forfeit	Goddesses of Stardom Tag League Blue Goddess Block match	—
2	Divine Kingdom (Maika and Megan Bayne) defeated FWC (Hazuki and Koguma) by forfeit	Goddesses of Stardom Tag League Blue Goddess Block match	—
3	Crazy Star (Suzu Suzuki and Mei Seira) defeated Anecon (Syuri and Saki Kashima) by forfeit	Goddesses of Stardom Tag League Red Goddess Block match	—
4	Syuri defeated Ruaka, Yuna Mizumori and Hanako	Four-way match	6:28
5	Crazy Star (Suzu Suzuki and Mei Seira) defeated Stars (Hazuki and Saya Iida)	Tag team match	9:53
6	Divine Kingdom (Maika and Megan Bayne) defeated 02line (AZM and Miyu Amasaki)	Tag team match	7:22
7	MiraiSaku (Mirai and Mai Sakurai) defeated Reiwa Tokyo Towers (Ami Sourei and Lady C)	Goddesses of Stardom Tag League Blue Goddess Block match	14:12
8	Moonlight Venus (Mina Shirakawa and Waka Tsukiyama) defeated XL (Natsuko Tora and Momo Watanabe)	Goddesses of Stardom Tag League Red Goddess Block match	9:55
9	Mafia Bella (Giulia and Thekla) vs. Prominence (Risa Sera and Hiragi Kurumi) ended in a time-limit draw	Goddesses of Stardom Tag League Red Goddess Block match	15:00
10	Divine Kingdom (Maika and Megan Bayne) defeated Crazy Star (Suzu Suzuki and Mei Seira)	Goddesses of Stardom Tag League Finals	15:47

== 2024 ==
Goddesses of Stardom Tag League
- 2024

Tournament information
- Sport: Professional wrestling
- Location: Japan
- Dates: October 26, 2024–December 8, 2024
- Tournament format: Two-block round-robin
- Host: World Wonder Ring Stardom
- Participants: 18

Final positions
- Champions: wing★gori
- Runner-up: Hai High Mate

The 2024 edition of the tournament took place starting on October 26 and culminated on December 8, 2024.

=== Overview ===
Current Standings
Red Goddess Block		Blue Goddess Block	
FWC (Hazuki and Koguma)	14	Natsu & Saori (Natsupoi and Saori Anou)	12
Cup High Mate (Maika and Hanako)	14	Mad Tiger Girl (Starlight Kid and Suzu Suzuki)	11
BMI2000 (Natsuko Tora and Ruaka)	8	wing★gori (Hanan and Saya Iida)	9
PsyQueen (Konami and Saya Kamitani)	7	Star Fox (Mei Seira and Cohaku)	9
02line (AZM and Miyu Amasaki)	7	H.A.T.E. Supreme (Momo Watanabe and Thekla)	9
Anecon (Syuri and Saki Kashima)	6	Devil Princess (Rina and Azusa Inaba)	8
Tokimeki Purin a la Mode (Tam Nakano and Sayaka Kurara)	6	Sakuradamon (Yuna Mizumori and Aya Sakura)	6
Peach☆Rock (Mayu Iwatani and Momo Kohgo)	6	Reckless Fantasy (Waka Tsukiyama and Rian)	4
Inaba and Yagami (Tomoka Inaba and Ranna Yagami)	4	Team Classroom (Hina and Lady C)	4

Red Goddess Block	Konami Kamitani	AZM Amasaki	Tora Ruaka	Syuri Kashima	Maika Hanako	Iwatani Kohgo	Nakano Kurara	Inaba Yagami	Hazuki Koguma
Konami Kamitani	—N/a	Draw (20:00)	Tora; Ruaka (11:36)	Syuri; Kashima (12:17)	Hanako; Maika (15:15)	Konami; Kamitani (12:16)	Konami; Kamitani (12:41)	Konami; Kamitani (11:46)	Hazuki; Koguma (9:23)
AZM Amasaki	Draw (20:00)	—N/a	Tora; Ruaka (11:29)	AZM; Amasaki (9:42)	Maika; Hanako (15:00)	Iwatani; Kohgo (13:40)	AZM; Amasaki (13:21)	AZM; Amasaki (14:46)	Hazuki; Koguma (15:23)
Tora Ruaka	Tora; Ruaka (11:36)	Tora; Ruaka (11:29)	—N/a	Tora; Ruaka (13:08)	Maika; Hanako (14:29)	Iwatani; Kohgo (12:59)	Nakano; Kurara (11:53)	Tora; Ruaka (10:55)	Hazuki; Koguma (14:52)
Syuri Kashima	Syuri; Kashima (12:17)	AZM; Amasaki (9:42)	Tora; Ruaka (13:08)	—N/a	Maika; Hanako (15:49)	Syuri; Kashima (8:56)	Nakano; Kurara (11:39)	Inaba; Yagami (11:13)	Syuri; Kashima (0:11)
Maika Hanako	Hanako; Maika (15:15)	Maika; Hanako (15:00)	Maika; Hanako (14:29)	Maika; Hanako (15:49)	—N/a	Maika; Hanako (11:33)	Maika; Hanako (9:13)	Maika; Hanako (11:57)	Hazuki; Koguma (15:30)
Iwatani Kohgo	Konami; Kamitani (12:16)	Iwatani; Kohgo (13:40)	Iwatani; Kohgo (12:59)	Syuri; Kashima (8:56)	Maika; Hanako (11:33)	—N/a	Iwatani; Kohgo (10:29)	Inaba; Yagami (12:44)	Hazuki; Koguma (13:33)
Nakano Kurara	Konami; Kamitani (12:41)	AZM; Amasaki (13:21)	Nakano; Kurara (11:53)	Nakano; Kurara (11:39)	Maika; Hanako (9:13)	Iwatani; Kohgo (10:29)	—N/a	Nakano; Kurara (15:36)	Hazuki; Koguma (16:14)
Inaba Yagami	Konami; Kamitani (11:46)	AZM; Amasaki (14:46)	Tora; Ruaka (10:55)	Inaba; Yagami (11:13)	Maika; Hanako (11:57)	Inaba; Yagami (12:44)	Nakano; Kurara (15:36)	—N/a	Hazuki; Koguma (15:10)
Hazuki Koguma	Hazuki; Koguma (9:23)	Hazuki; Koguma (15:23)	Hazuki; Koguma (14:52)	Syuri; Kashima (0:11)	Hazuki; Koguma (15:30)	Hazuki; Koguma (13:33)	Hazuki; Koguma (16:14)	Hazuki; Koguma (15:10)	—N/a

Blue Goddess Block	Watanabe Thekla	Natsupoi Anou	Kid Suzuki	Hanan Iida	Seira Kohaku	Mizumori Sakura	Rina Inaba	Hina Lady C	Tsukiyama Rian
Watanabe Thekla	—N/a	Watanabe; Thekla (18:29)	Double Count-out (12:42)	Watanabe; Thekla (12:47)	Seira; Kohaku (12:14)	Watanabe; Thekla (11:01)	Rina; Inaba (14:50)	Watanabe; Thekla (14:31)	Watanabe; Thekla (12:21)
Natsupoi Anou	Watanabe; Thekla (18:29)	—N/a	Draw (20:00)	Draw (20:00)	Natsupoi; Anou (9:22)	Natsupoi; Anou (17:09)	Natsupoi; Anou (11:27)	Natsupoi; Anou (11:46)	Natsupoi; Anou (9:11)
Kid Suzuki	Double Count-out (12:42)	Draw (20:00)	—N/a	Kid; Suzuki (14:36)	Draw (20:00)	Kid; Suzuki (10:57)	Rina; Inaba (13:10)	Kid; Suzuki (9:23)	Kid; Suzuki (10:00)
Hanan Iida	Watanabe; Thekla (12:47)	Draw (20:00)	Kid; Suzuki (14:36)	—N/a	Hanan; Iida (9:15)	Hanan; Iida (12:23)	Rina; Inaba (12:15)	Hina; Lady C (13:36)	Hanan; Iida (7:53)
Seira Kohaku	Seira; Kohaku (12:14)	Natsupoi; Anou (9:22)	Draw (20:00)	Hanan; Iida (9:15)	—N/a	Seira; Kohaku (11:50)	Rina; Inaba (12:39)	Seira; Kohaku (10:33)	Seira; Kohaku (10:05)
Mizumori Sakura	Watanabe; Thekla (11:01)	Natsupoi; Anou (17:09)	Kid; Suzuki (10:57)	Hanan; Iida (12:23)	Seira; Kohaku (11:50)	—N/a	Mizumori; Sakura (13:00)	Mizumori; Sakura (12:16)	Mizumori; Sakura (9:13)
Rina Inaba	Rina; Inaba (14:50)	Natsupoi; Anou (11:27)	Rina; Inaba (13:10)	Rina; Inaba (12:15)	Rina; Inaba (12:39)	Mizumori; Sakura (13:00)	—N/a	Hina; Lady C (11:31)	Tsukiyama; Rian (9:16)
Hina Lady C	Watanabe; Thekla (14:31)	Natsupoi; Anou (11:46)	Kid; Suzuki (9:23)	Hina; Lady C (13:36)	Seira; Kohaku (10:33)	Mizumori; Sakura (12:16)	Hina; Lady C (11:31)	—N/a	Tsukiyama; Rian (11:09)
Tsukiyama Rian	Watanabe; Thekla (12:21)	Natsupoi; Anou (9:11)	Kid; Suzuki (10:00)	Hanan; Iida (7:53)	Seira; Kohaku (10:05)	Mizumori; Sakura (9:13)	Tsukiyama; Rian (9:16)	Tsukiyama; Rian (11:09)	—N/a

Quarterfinals
R2	Maika and Hanako	Pin
R3	Natsuko Tora and Ruaka	12:12
B2	Starlight Kid and Suzu Suzuki	10:13
B3	Hanan and Saya Iida	Pin

Semifinals
R1	Hazuki and Koguma	13:47
R2	Maika and Hanako	Pin
B1	Natsupoi and Saori Anou	12:44
B3	Hanan and Saya Iida	Pin

Finals
R2	Maika and Hanako	15:35
B3	Hanan and Saya Iida	Pin

==== Night 1 ====
The first night took place on October 26, 2024.

No.	Results	Stipulations	Times
1	Natsu & Saori (Natsupoi and Saori Anou) defeated Star Fox (Mei Seira and Kohaku)	Goddesses of Stardom Tag League Blue Goddess Block match	9:22
2	Reckless Fantasy (Waka Tsukiyama and Rian) defeated Team Classroom (Hina and Lady C)	Goddesses of Stardom Tag League Blue Goddess Block match	11:09
3	Empress Nexus Venus (Maika, Mina Shirakawa and Hanako) defeated Suzu Suzuki, Saya Iida and Ranna Yagami	Six-woman tag team match	10:21
4	Starlight Kid and Haruka Umesaki vs. H.A.T.E. (Momo Watanabe and Rina) ended in a double count-out	Tag team match	10:42
5	Anecon (Syuri and Saki Kashima) defeated PsyQueen (Konami and Saya Kamitani)	Goddesses of Stardom Tag League Blue Goddess Block match	12:17
6	Peach☆Rock (Mayu Iwatani and Momo Kohgo) defeated 02line (AZM and Miyu Amasaki)	Goddesses of Stardom Tag League Blue Goddess Block match	13:40
7	FWC (Hazuki and Koguma) defeated BMI2000 (Natsuko Tora and Ruaka)	Goddesses of Stardom Tag League Red Goddess Block match	14:52

==== Night 2 ====
The second night took place on October 27, 2024.

No.	Results	Stipulations	Times
1	Dump Matsumoto, Zap and H.A.T.E. (Natsuko Tora, Momo Watanabe and Ruaka) defeated Cosmic Angels (Aya Sakura, Natsupoi, Saori Anou, Sayaka Kurara and Tam Nakano)	Ten-woman tag team match	8:15
2	Anecon (Syuri and Saki Kashima) defeated FWC (Hazuki and Koguma)	Goddesses of Stardom Tag League Red Goddess Block match	0:11
3	Reckless Fantasy (Waka Tsukiyama and Rian) defeated Devil Princess (Rina and Azusa Inaba)	Goddesses of Stardom Tag League Blue Goddess Block match	9:16
4	Mina Shirakawa, Saya Iida and Starlight Kid defeated God's Eye (Hina, Lady C and Ranna Yagami)	Six-woman tag team match	13:05
5	PsyQueen (Konami and Saya Kamitani) defeated Peach☆Rock (Mayu Iwatani and Momo Kohgo)	Goddesses of Stardom Tag League Red Goddess Block match	12:16
6	High Mate (Maika and Hanako) defeated 02line (AZM and Miyu Amasaki)	Goddesses of Stardom Tag League Red Goddess Block match	15:00
7	Mei Seira (c) defeated Yuna Mizumori	Singles match for the High Speed Championship	13:49
(c) / – the champion(s) heading into the match

==== Night 3 ====
The third night took place on October 31, 2024.

No.	Results	Stipulations	Times
1	Suzu Suzuki and Syuri defeated Empress Nexus Venus (Mina Shirakawa and Rian)	Tag team match	13:37
2	AZM and Saya Iida defeated God's Eye (Lady C and Ranna Yagami)	Tag team match	11:47
3	H.A.T.E. (Natsuko Tora, Ruaka and Saya Kamitani) defeated Neo Genesis (Mei Seira, Miyu Amasaki and Starlight Kid)	Six-woman tag team match	10:17
4	FWC (Hazuki and Koguma) defeated Tokimeki Purin a la Mode (Tam Nakano and Sayaka Kurara)	Goddesses of Stardom Tag League Red Goddess Block match	16:14
5	Hai High Mate (Maika and Hanako) defeated Peach☆Rock (Mayu Iwatani and Momo Kohgo)	Goddesses of Stardom Tag League Blue Goddess Block match	11:33
6	Natsu & Saori (Natsupoi and Saori Anou) defeated Sakuradamon (Yuna Mizumori and Aya Sakura)	Goddesses of Stardom Tag League Blue Goddess Block match	17:09

==== Night 4 ====
The fourth night took place on November 2, 2024.

No.	Results	Stipulations	Times
1	Momo Kohgo defeated Hanan, Mina Shirakawa, Rian, Saya Kamitani and Syuri	Six-way match	8:24
2	Natsu & Saori (Natsupoi and Saori Anou) defeated Team Classroom (Hina and Lady C)	Goddesses of Stardom Tag League Blue Goddess Block match	11:46
3	BMI2000 (Natsuko Tora and Ruaka) defeated 02line (AZM and Miyu Amasaki)	Goddesses of Stardom Tag League Red Goddess Block match	11:29
4	Star Fox (Mei Seira and Kohaku) defeated Sakuradamon (Yuna Mizumori and Aya Sakura)	Goddesses of Stardom Tag League Blue Goddess Block match	11:50
5	Tokimeki Purin a la Mode (Tam Nakano and Sayaka Kurara) defeated God's Eye (Tomoka Inaba and Ranna Yagami)	Goddesses of Stardom Tag League Red Goddess Block match	15:36
6	Devil Princess (Rina and Azusa Inaba) defeated Mad Tiger Girl (Starlight Kid and Suzu Suzuki)	Goddesses of Stardom Tag League Blue Goddess Block match	13:10
7	Fukuoka Triple Crazy (Maika and FWC (Hazuki and Koguma)) defeated Hanako and Stars (Mayu Iwatani and Saya Iida)	Six-woman tag team match	22:43

==== Night 5 ====
The fifth night took place on November 3, 2024.

No.	Results	Stipulations	Times
1	Mei Seira and Kohaku defeated God's Eye (Hina and Lady C)	Goddesses of Stardom Tag League Blue Goddess Block match	10:33
2	Hanako defeated Rian and Syuri	Three-way match	6:22
3	REStart (Natsupoi and Saori Anou) defeated Devil Princess (Rina and Azusa Inaba)	Goddesses of Stardom Tag League Blue Goddess Block match	11:27
4	Peach☆Rock (Mayu Iwatani and Momo Kohgo) defeated Sakuradamon (Yuna Mizumori and Aya Sakura), Empress Nexus Venus (Maika and Mina Shirakawa), and BMI2000 (Natsuko Tora and Ruaka)	Four-way tag team match	7:43
5	FWC (Hazuki and Koguma) defeated God's Eye (Tomoka Inaba and Ranna Yagami)	Goddesses of Stardom Tag League Red Goddess Block match	15:10
6	02line (AZM and Miyu Amasaki) defeated Cosmic Angels (Tam Nakano and Sayaka Kurara)	Goddesses of Stardom Tag League Red Goddess Block match	13:21
7	Neo Genesis (Starlight Kid and Suzu Suzuki) defeated wing★gori (Hanan and Saya Iida)	Goddesses of Stardom Tag League Blue Goddess Block match	14:36

==== Night 6 ====
The sixth night took place on November 4, 2024.

No.	Results	Stipulations	Times
1	God's Eye (Hina, Lady C and Syuri) and Neo Genesis (Mei Seira, Miyu Amasaki and Starlight Kid) defeated Cosmic Angels (Sayaka Kurara and Tam Nakano) and Empress Nexus Venus (Maika, Hanako, Mina Shirakawa and Rian)	Twelve-woman tag team match	12:54
2	Sakuradamon (Yuna Mizumori and Aya Sakura) defeated Devil Princess (Rina and Azusa Inaba)	Goddesses of Stardom Tag League Blue Goddess Block match	13:00
3	BMI2000 (Natsuko Tora and Ruaka) defeated God's Eye (Tomoka Inaba and Ranna Yagami)	Goddesses of Stardom Tag League Red Goddess Block match	10:55
4	REStart (Natsupoi and Saori Anou) vs. wing★gori (Hanan and Saya Iida) ended in a time-limit draw	Goddesses of Stardom Tag League Blue Goddess Block match	20:00
5	FWC (Hazuki and Koguma) defeated Peach☆Rock (Mayu Iwatani and Momo Kohgo)	Goddesses of Stardom Tag League Red Goddess Block match	13:33
6	Suzu Suzuki defeated AZM	Singles match	16:53

==== Night 7 ====
The seventh night took place on November 9, 2024.

No.	Results	Stipulations	Times
1	Mei Seira and Kohaku vs. Neo Genesis (Starlight Kid and Suzu Suzuki) ended in a time-limit draw	Goddesses of Stardom Tag League Blue Goddess Block match	20:00
2	PsyQueen (Konami and Saya Kamitani) defeated Cosmic Angels (Natsupoi and Sayaka Kurara) and Empress Nexus Venus (Hanako and Rian)	Three-way tag team match	8:44
3	02line (AZM and Miyu Amasaki) defeated Maika and Yuna Mizumori	Tag team match	10:16
4	H.A.T.E. Supreme (Momo Watanabe and Thekla) defeated God's Eye (Hina and Lady C)	Goddesses of Stardom Tag League Blue Goddess Block match	14:31
5	Devil Princess (Rina and Azusa Inaba) defeated wing★gori (Hanan and Saya Iida)	Goddesses of Stardom Tag League Blue Goddess Block match	12:15
6	God's Eye (Tomoka Inaba and Ranna Yagami) defeated Anecon (Syuri and Saki Kashima)	Goddesses of Stardom Tag League Red Goddess Block match	11:13
7	Peach☆Rock (Mayu Iwatani and Momo Kohgo) defeated BMI2000 (Natsuko Tora and Ruaka)	Goddesses of Stardom Tag League Red Goddess Block match	12:59

==== Night 8 ====
The eighth night took place on November 10, 2024.

No.	Results	Stipulations	Times
1	Mayu Iwatani, Suzu Suzuki and Tam Nakano defeated Ranna Yagami, Rian and Sayaka Kurara	Six-woman tag team match	15:43
2	Starlight Kid defeated Momo Kohgo, Natsupoi and Rina	Four-way match	9:51
3	H.A.T.E. Supreme (Momo Watanabe and Thekla) defeated Sakuradamon (Yuna Mizumori and Aya Sakura)	Goddesses of Stardom Tag League Blue Goddess Block match	11:01
4	God's Eye (Hina and Lady C) defeated wing★gori (Hanan and Saya Iida)	Goddesses of Stardom Tag League Blue Goddess Block match	13:36
5	BMI2000 (Natsuko Tora and Ruaka) defeated PsyQueen (Konami and Saya Kamitani)	Goddesses of Stardom Tag League Red Goddess Block match	11:36
6	High Mate (Maika and Hanako) defeated Anecon (Syuri and Saki Kashima)	Goddesses of Stardom Tag League Red Goddess Block match	15:49

==== Night 9 ====
The ninth night took place on November 11, 2024.

No.	Results	Stipulations	Times
1	PsyQueen (Konami and Saya Kamitani) defeated Cosmic Angels (Tam Nakano and Sayaka Kurara)	Goddesses of Stardom Tag League Red Goddess Block match	12:41
2	02line (AZM and Miyu Amasaki) and FWC (Hazuki and Koguma) defeated Anecon (Hina, Lady C, Tomoka Inaba and Ranna Yagami)	Eight-woman tag team match	10:37
3	Neo Genesis (Starlight Kid and Suzu Suzuki) defeated Gamushara Fantasy (Waka Tsukiyama and Rian)	Goddesses of Stardom Tag League Blue Goddess Block match	10:00
4	Devil Princess (Rina and Azusa Inaba) defeated Mei Seira and Kohaku	Goddesses of Stardom Tag League Blue Goddess Block match	12:39
5	Anecon (Syuri and Saki Kashima) defeated Peach☆Rock (Mayu Iwatani and Momo Kohgo)	Goddesses of Stardom Tag League Red Goddess Block match	8:56
6	wing★gori (Hanan and Saya Iida) defeated Sakuradamon (Yuna Mizumori and Aya Sakura)	Goddesses of Stardom Tag League Blue Goddess Block match	12:23
7	High Mate (Maika and Hanako) defeated BMI2000 (Natsuko Tora and Ruaka)	Goddesses of Stardom Tag League Red Goddess Block match	14:29
8	H.A.T.E. Supreme (Momo Watanabe and Thekla) defeated REStart (Natsupoi and Saori Anou)	Goddesses of Stardom Tag League Blue Goddess Block match	18:29

==== Night 10 ====
The tenth night took place on November 20, 2024.

No.	Results	Stipulations	Times
1	Aya Sakura defeated Lady C and Matoi Hamabe	Three-way match	6:46
2	Peach☆Rock (Mayu Iwatani and Momo Kohgo) defeated H.A.T.E. (Azusa Inaba and Konami)	Tag team match	10:38
3	H.A.T.E. (Natsuko Tora, Saya Kamitani and Ruaka) defeated Cosmic Angels (Sayaka Kurara, Tam Nakano and Yuna Mizumori)	Six-woman tag team match	12:13
4	wing★gori (Hanan and Saya Iida) defeated Mei Seira and Kohaku	Goddesses of Stardom Tag League Blue Goddess Block match	9:15
5	H.A.T.E. Supreme (Momo Watanabe and Thekla) defeated Gamushara Fantasy (Waka Tsukiyama and Rian)	Goddesses of Stardom Tag League Blue Goddess Block match	12:21
6	High Mate (Maika and Hanako) defeated God's Eye (Tomoka Inaba and Ranna Yagami)	Goddesses of Stardom Tag League Red Goddess Block match	11:57
7	REStart (Natsupoi and Saori Anou) vs. Neo Genesis (Starlight Kid and Suzu Suzuki) ended in a time-limit draw	Goddesses of Stardom Tag League Blue Goddess Block match	20:00
8	FWC (Hazuki and Koguma) defeated 02line (AZM and Miyu Amasaki)	Goddesses of Stardom Tag League Red Goddess Block match	15:23

==== Night 11 ====
The eleventh night took place on November 21, 2024.

No.	Results	Stipulations	Times
1	Ruaka defeated Lady C and Sayaka Kurara	Three-way match	9:36
2	Star Fox (Kohaku and Mei Seira) defeated Gamushara Fantasy (Waka Tsukiyama and Rian)	Goddesses of Stardom Tag League Blue Goddess Block match	10:05
3	02line (AZM and Miyu Amasaki) defeated H.A.T.E. (Azusa Inaba and Natsuko Tora)	Tag team match	11:28
4	Cosmic Angels (Aya Sakura, Natsupoi, Saori Anou, Tam Nakano and Yuna Mizumori) defeated Matoi Hamabe and Stars (Hanan, Mayu Iwatani, Momo Kohgo and Saya Iida)	Eight-woman tag team match	15:43
5	PsyQueen (Konami and Saya Kamitani) defeated God's Eye (Tomoka Inaba and Ranna Yagami)	Goddesses of Stardom Tag League Red Goddess Block match	11:46
6	H.A.T.E. Supreme (Momo Watanabe and Thekla) vs. Neo Genesis (Starlight Kid and Suzu Suzuki) ended in a double count-out	Goddesses of Stardom Tag League Blue Goddess Block match	12:42
7	FWC (Hazuki and Koguma) defeated High Mate (Maika and Hanako)	Goddesses of Stardom Tag League Red Goddess Block match	15:30

==== Night 12 ====
The twelfth night took place on November 23, 2024.

No.	Results	Stipulations	Times
1	Empress Nexus Venus (Hanako and Waka Tsukiyama) defeated Empress Nexus Venus (Maika and Rian)	Tag team match	7:11
2	Neo Genesis (Mei Seira, Starlight Kid and Suzu Suzuki) defeated Stars (Hanan and Momo Kohgo) and Matoi Hamabe	Six-woman tag team match	11:19
3	Sakuradamon (Yuna Mizumori and Aya Sakura) defeated God's Eye (Hina and Lady C)	Goddesses of Stardom Tag League Blue Goddess Block match	12:16
4	Stars (Hazuki, Koguma, Mayu Iwatani and Saya Iida) defeated H.A.T.E. (Konami, Natsuko Tora, Ruaka and Saya Kamitani)	Eight-woman tag team match	12:20
5	02line (AZM and Miyu Amasaki) defeated God's Eye (Tomoka Inaba and Ranna Yagami)	Goddesses of Stardom Tag League Red Goddess Block match	14:46
6	Devil Princess (Rina and Azusa Inaba) defeated H.A.T.E. Supreme (Momo Watanabe and Thekla)	Goddesses of Stardom Tag League Blue Goddess Block match	14:50
7	Cosmic Angels (Tam Nakano and Sayaka Kurara) defeated Anecon (Syuri and Saki Kashima)	Goddesses of Stardom Tag League Red Goddess Block match	11:39

==== Night 13 ====
The thirteenth night took place on November 24, 2024.

No.	Results	Stipulations	Times
1	wing★gori (Hanan and Saya Iida) defeated Gamushara Fantasy (Waka Tsukiyama and Rian)	Goddesses of Stardom Tag League Blue Goddess Block match	7:53
2	AZM defeated Matoi Hamabe and Natsupoi	Three-way match	7:50
3	God's Eye (Hina and Lady C) defeated Devil Princess (Rina and Azusa Inaba)	Goddesses of Stardom Tag League Blue Goddess Block match	11:31
4	Anecon (Syuri and Saki Kashima) defeated H.A.T.E. Supreme (Momo Watanabe and Thekla), Neo Genesis (Mei Seira and Miyu Amasaki) and FWC (Hazuki and Koguma)	Four-way tag team match	7:54
5	Neo Genesis (Starlight Kid and Suzu Suzuki) defeated Sakuradamon (Yuna Mizumori and Aya Sakura)	Goddesses of Stardom Tag League Blue Goddess Block match	10:57
6	God's Eye (Tomoka Inaba and Ranna Yagami) defeated Peach☆Rock (Mayu Iwatani and Momo Kohgo)	Goddesses of Stardom Tag League Red Goddess Block match	12:44
7	Cosmic Angels (Tam Nakano and Sayaka Kurara) defeated BMI2000 (Natsuko Tora and Ruaka)	Goddesses of Stardom Tag League Red Goddess Block match	11:53
8	High Mate (Maika and Hanako) defeated PsyQueen (Konami and Saya Kamitani)	Goddesses of Stardom Tag League Red Goddess Block match	15:15

==== Night 14 ====
The fourteenth night took place on November 30, 2024.

No.	Results	Stipulations	Times
1	REStart (Natsupoi and Saori Anou) defeated Gamushara Fantasy (Waka Tsukiyama and Rian)	Goddesses of Stardom Tag League Blue Goddess Block match	9:11
2	Natsuko Tora defeated Aya Sakura and Matoi Hamabe	Three-way match	7:16
3	Suzu Suzuki and Yuna Mizumori defeated God's Eye (Ranna Yagami and Lady C)	Tag team match	7:51
4	FWC (Hazuki and Koguma) defeated PsyQueen (Konami and Saya Kamitani)	Goddesses of Stardom Tag League Red Goddess Block match	9:23
5	02line (AZM and Miyu Amasaki) defeated Anecon (Syuri and Saki Kashima)	Goddesses of Stardom Tag League Red Goddess Block match	9:42
6	Peach☆Rock (Mayu Iwatani and Momo Kohgo) defeated Cosmic Angels (Tam Nakano and Sayaka Kurara)	Goddesses of Stardom Tag League Red Goddess Block match	10:29
7	Star Fox (Kohaku and Mei Seira) defeated H.A.T.E. Supreme (Momo Watanabe and Thekla)	Goddesses of Stardom Tag League Blue Goddess Block match	12:14
8	Hanan, Hina and Rina defeated Ruaka, Saya Iida and Starlight Kid	Six-woman tag team match	20:06

==== Night 15 ====
The fifteenth night took place on December 1, 2024.

No.	Results	Stipulations	Times
1	Peach☆Rock (Mayu Iwatani and Momo Kohgo) defeated Matoi Hamabe and Ranna Yagami	Tag team match	7:07
2	Sakuradamon (Yuna Mizumori and Aya Sakura) defeated Gamushara Fantasy (Waka Tsukiyama and Rian)	Goddesses of Stardom Tag League Blue Goddess Block match	9:13
3	Natsupoi defeated Mei Seira and Rina	Three-way match	7:10
4	High Mate (Maika and Hanako) defeated Cosmic Angels (Tam Nakano and Sayaka Kurara)	Goddesses of Stardom Tag League Red Goddess Block match	10:19
5	Neo Genesis (Starlight Kid and Suzu Suzuki) defeated God's Eye (Hina and Lady C)	Goddesses of Stardom Tag League Blue Goddess Block match	9:23
6	PsyQueen (Konami and Saya Kamitani) vs. 02line (AZM and Miyu Amasaki) ended in a time-limit draw	Goddesses of Stardom Tag League Red Goddess Block match	20:00
7	H.A.T.E. Supreme (Momo Watanabe and Thekla) defeated wing★gori (Hanan and Saya Iida) by count-out	Goddesses of Stardom Tag League Blue Goddess Block match	12:47
8	BMI2000 (Natsuko Tora and Ruaka) defeated Anecon (Syuri and Saki Kashima)	Goddesses of Stardom Tag League Red Goddess Block match	13:08

==== Night 16 ====
The sixteenth night took place on December 7, 2024.

No.	Results	Stipulations	Times
1	Cosmic Angels (Tam Nakano and Sayaka Kurara) defeated Sakuradamon (Yuna Mizumori and Aya Sakura)	Tag team match	13:48
2	High Mate (Maika and Hanako) defeated BMI2000 (Natsuko Tora and Ruaka)	Goddesses of Stardom Tag League quarterfinals match	12:12
3	wing★gori (Hanan and Saya Iida) defeated Neo Genesis (Starlight Kid and Suzu Suzuki)	Goddesses of Stardom Tag League quarterfinals match	10:13
4	Waka Tsukiyama defeated Rian	Singles match	10:05
5	Neo Genesis (AZM, Mei Seira and Miyu Amasaki) defeated Matoi Hamabe and Peach☆Rock (Mayu Iwatani and Momo Kohgo)	Six-woman tag team match	12:38
6	H.A.T.E. (Fukigen Death, Konami, Momo Watanabe, Rina and Saya Kamitani) defeated God's Eye (Hina, Lady C, Ranna Yagami, Saki Kashima and Syuri)	Ten-woman tag team match	14:55
7	Cup High Mate (Maika and Hanako) defeated FWC (Hazuki and Koguma)	Goddesses of Stardom Tag League semifinals match	13:47
8	wing★gori (Hanan and Saya Iida) defeated Natsu & Saori (Natsupoi and Saori Anou)	Goddesses of Stardom Tag League semifinals match	12:44

== 2025 ==
Goddesses of Stardom Tag League
- 2025

Tournament information
- Sport: Professional wrestling
- Location: Japan
- Dates: November 7, 2025–November 30, 2025
- Tournament format: Two-block round-robin
- Host: World Wonder Ring Stardom
- Participants: 16

Final positions
- Champions: Sakurara (Aya Sakura and Sayaka Kurara)
- Runner-up: BMI2000 (Natsuko Tora and Ruaka)

The 2025 edition of the tournament started on November 7 and ended on November 30, 2025.

=== Overview ===
Current Standings
Red Goddess Block		Blue Goddess Block	
BMI2000 (Natsuko Tora and Ruaka)	12	Mega Skyscrapers (Hanako and Megan Bayne)	11
T-Hearts (Sareee and Miku Kanae)	8	Anecon (Syuri and Saki Kashima)	9
Mi Vida Loca (Bozilla and Akira Kurogane)	8	Sakurara (Aya Sakura and Sayaka Kurara)	8
SaoriPoi (Natsupoi and Saori Anou)	8	Gorilla Trigger (Saya Iida and Bea Priestley)	8
Dos Locas de México (Teotleco and Osita)	7	New☆Sisters (Konami and Rina)	6
AquaStella (Yuna Mizumori and Mei Seira)	7	Reiwa Tokyo Towers (Ami Sohrei and Lady C)	6
Blue Flame (Hina and Ranna Yagami)	6	02line (AZM and Miyu Amasaki)	4
Reckless Fantasy (Waka Tsukiyama and Rian)	0	Bloody Girls’ School (Suzu Suzuki and Rina Yamashita)	4

Red Goddess Block	Tora Ruaka	Natsupoi Anou	Mizumori Seira	Hina Yagami	Tsukiyama Rian	Bozilla Kurogane	Teotleco Osito	Sareee Kanae
Tora Ruaka	—N/a	Tora; Ruaka (12:10)	Tora; Ruaka (6:41)	Tora; Ruaka (10:02)	Tora; Ruaka (10:25)	Bozilla; Kurogane (10:00)	Tora; Ruaka (10:10)	Tora; Ruaka (9:00)
Natsupoi Anou	Tora; Ruaka (12:10)	—N/a	Natsupoi; Anou (11:30)	Natsupoi; Anou (11:58)	Natsupoi; Anou (10:32)	Bozilla; Kurogane (14:32)	Natsupoi; Anou (14:46)	Sareee; Kanae (12:07)
Mizumori Seira	Tora; Ruaka (6:41)	Natsupoi; Anou (11:30)	—N/a	Mizumori; Seira (7:50)	Mizumori; Seira (14:39)	Bozilla; Kurogane (10:32)	Draw (15:00)	Mizumori; Seira (10:36)
Hina Yagami	Tora; Ruaka (10:02)	Natsupoi; Anou (11:58)	Mizumori; Seira (7:50)	—N/a	Hina; Yagami (8:54)	Hina; Yagami (9:44)	Teotleco; Osito (8:49)	Hina; Yagami (8:53)
Tsukiyama Rian	Tora; Ruaka (10:25)	Natsupoi; Anou (10:32)	Mizumori; Seira (14:39)	Hina; Yagami (8:54)	—N/a	Bozilla; Kurogane (8:53)	Teotleco; Osito (7:19)	Sareee; Kanae (8:55)
Bozilla Kurogane	Bozilla; Kurogane (10:00)	Bozilla; Kurogane (14:32)	Bozilla; Kurogane (10:32)	Hina; Yagami (9:44)	Bozilla; Kurogane (8:53)	—N/a	Teotleco; Osito (8:11)	Sareee; Kanae (10:14)
Teotleco Osito	Tora; Ruaka (10:10)	Natsupoi; Anou (14:46)	Draw (15:00)	Teotleco; Osito (8:49)	Teotleco; Osito (7:19)	Teotleco; Osito (8:11)	—N/a	Sareee; Kanae (9:27)
Sareee Kanae	Tora; Ruaka (9:00)	Sareee; Kanae (12:07)	Mizumori; Seira (10:36)	Hina; Yagami (8:53)	Sareee; Kanae (8:55)	Sareee; Kanae (10:14)	Sareee; Kanae (9:27)	—N/a

Blue Goddess Block	Iida Priestley	Sakura Kurara	Syuri Kashima	Sohrei Lady C	Hanako Bayne	AZM Amasaki	Suzuki Yamashita	Konami Rina
Iida Priestley	—N/a	Sakura; Kurara (13:38)	Iida; Priestley (9:00)	Sohrei; Lady C (13:21)	Hanako; Bayne (14:54)	Iida; Priestley (9:36)	Iida; Priestley (forfeit)	Iida; Priestley (11:37)
Sakura Kurara	Sakura; Kurara (13:38)	—N/a	Syuri; Kashima (10:21)	Sakura; Kurara (10:22)	Hanako; Bayne (10:12)	Sakura; Kurara (10:26)	Sakura; Kurara (forfeit)	Konami; Rina (10:26)
Syuri Kashima	Iida; Priestley (9:00)	Syuri; Kashima (10:21)	—N/a	Sohrei; Lady C (12:54)	Draw (15:00)	Syuri; Kashima (10:19)	Syuri; Kashima (8:13)	Syuri; Kashima (9:21)
Sohrei Lady C	Sohrei; Lady C (13:21)	Sakura; Kurara (10:22)	Sohrei; Lady C (12:54)	—N/a	Hanako; Bayne (13:28)	AZM; Amasaki (9:55)	Sohrei; Lady C (11:34)	Konami; Rina (14:28)
Hanako Bayne	Hanako; Bayne (14:54)	Hanako; Bayne (10:12)	Draw (15:00)	Hanako; Bayne (13:28)	—N/a	Hanako; Bayne (6:59)	Suzuki; Yamashita (13:14)	Hanako; Bayne (13:59)
AZM Amasaki	Iida; Priestley (9:36)	Sakura; Kurara (10:26)	Syuri; Kashima (10:19)	AZM; Amasaki (9:55)	Hanako; Bayne (6:59)	—N/a	AZM; Amasaki (7:41)	Konami; Rina (11:33)
Suzuki Yamashita	Iida; Priestley (forfeit)	Sakura; Kurara (forfeit)	Syuri; Kashima (8:13)	Sohrei; Lady C (11:34)	Suzuki; Yamashita (13:14)	AZM; Amasaki (7:41)	—N/a	Suzuki; Yamashita (11:44)
Konami Rina	Iida; Priestley (11:37)	Konami; Rina (10:26)	Syuri; Kashima (9:21)	Konami; Rina (14:28)	Hanako; Bayne (13:59)	Konami; Rina (11:33)	Suzuki; Yamashita (11:44)	—N/a

Quarterfinals
R2	Sareee and Miku Kanae	Pin
R3	Bozilla and Akira Kurogane	15:09
B2	Aya Sakura and Sayaka Kurara	13:38
B3	Saya Iida and Bea Priestley (Note: They took Anecon’s place after they had to withdraw due to Saki Kashima sustaining an injury)	Pin

Semifinals
R1	Natsuko Tora and Ruaka	10:30
R3	Bozilla and Akira Kurogane	Pin
B1	Hanako and Megan Bayne	Pin
B2	Aya Sakura and Sayaka Kurara	10:55

Finals
R1	Natsuko Tora and Ruaka	Pin
B2	Aya Sakura and Sayaka Kurara	17:25

==== Night 1 ====
The first night took place on November 7, 2025.

No.	Results	Stipulations	Times
1	Momo Kohgo defeated Ema Maishima by pinfall	Singles match	7:20
2	Saya Kamitani defeated Kikyo Furusawa by submission	Singles match	5:34
3	New☆Sisters (Konami and Rina) defeated Sakurara (Aya Sakura and Sayaka Kurara) by Submission	Goddesses of Stardom Tag League Blue Goddess Block match	10:26
4	Gorilla Trigger (Saya Iida and Bea Priestley) defeated 02line (AZM and Miyu Amasaki) by pinfall	Goddesses of Stardom Tag League Blue Goddess Block match	9:36
5	Anecon (Syuri and Saki Kashima) defeated Bloody Girls’ School (Suzu Suzuki and Rina Yamashita) by pinfall	Goddesses of Stardom Tag League Blue Goddess Block match	8:13
6	AquaStella (Yuna Mizumori and Mei Seira) defeated T-Hearts (Sareee and Miku Kanae) by pinfall	Goddesses of Stardom Tag League Red Goddess Block match	10:36
7	Megan Bayne and Empress Nexus Venus (Hanako, Waka Tsukiyama, Rian) defeated Reiwa Tokyo Towers (Ami Sohrei and Lady C) and Mi Vida Loca (Bozilla and Akira Kurogane) by pinfall	Eight-woman tag team match	11:33
8	SaoriPoi (Natsupoi and Saori Anou) defeated DLM (Teotleco and Osito) by pinfall	Goddesses of Stardom Tag League Red Goddess Block match	14:46
9	BMI2000 (Natsuko Tora and Ruaka) defeated Blue Flame (Hina and Ranna Yagami) by pinfall	Goddesses of Stardom Tag League Red Goddess Block match	10:02

==== Night 2 ====
The second night took place on November 8, 2025.

No.	Results	Stipulations	Times
1	Mega Skyscrapers (Hanako and Megan Bayne) defeated Sakurara (Aya Sakura and Sayaka Kurara) by pinfall	Goddesses of Stardom Tag League Blue Goddess Block match	10:12
2	Ram Kaicho and H.A.T.E. (Rina and Ruaka) defeated Yuna Mizumori, Mei Seira, and Momo Kohgo by pinfall	Six-woman tag team match	9:53
3	T-Hearts (Sareee and Miku Kanae) defeated Reckless Fantasy (Waka Tsukiyama and Rian) by pinfall	Goddesses of Stardom Tag League Red Goddess Block match	8:55
4	DLM (Teotleco and Osito) defeated Mi Vida Loca (Bozilla and Akira Kurogane) by submission	Goddesses of Stardom Tag League Red Goddess Block match	8:11
5	Kikyo Furusawa and Reiwa Tokyo Towers (Ami Sohrei and Lady C) defeated H.A.T.E. (Natsuko Tora, Saya Kamitani, and Konami) by pinfall	Six-woman tag team match	9:51
6	Gorilla Trigger (Saya Iida and Bea Priestley) defeated Anecon (Syuri and Saki Kashima) by pinfall	Goddesses of Stardom Tag League Blue Goddess Block match	9:00
7	02line (AZM and Miyu Amasaki) defeated Bloody Girls’ School (Suzu Suzuki and Rina Yamashita) by pinfall	Goddesses of Stardom Tag League Blue Goddess Block match	7:41
8	SaoriPoi (Natsupoi and Saori Anou) defeated Blue Flame (Hina and Ranna Yagami) by pinfall	Goddesses of Stardom Tag League Red Goddess Block match	11:58

==== Night 3 ====
The third night took place on November 9, 2025.

No.	Results	Stipulations	Times
1	Mi Vida Loca (Bozilla and Akira Kurogane) defeated AquaStella (Yuna Mizumori and Mei Seira) by pinfall	Goddesses of Stardom Tag League Red Goddess Block match	10:32
2	DLM (Teotleco and Osito) defeated Reckless Fantasy (Waka Tsukiyama and Rian) by pinfall	Goddesses of Stardom Tag League Red Goddess Block match	7:19
3	Blue Flame (Hina and Ranna Yagami) defeated T-Hearts (Sareee and Miku Kanae) by pinfall	Goddesses of Stardom Tag League Red Goddess Block match	8:53
4	Stars (Saya Iida, Bea Priestley, Momo Kohgo) defeated Cosmic Angels (Natsupoi, Sayaka Kurara, Aya Sakura) and H.A.T.E. (Saya Kamitani, Rina, Konami) by pinfall	three-way tag match	13:29
5	Anecon (Syuri and Saki Kashima) defeated 02line (AZM and Miyu Amasaki) by submission	Goddesses of Stardom Tag League Blue Goddess Block match	10:19
6	Mega Skyscrapers (Hanako and Megan Bayne) defeated Reiwa Toyko Towers (Ami Sohrei and Lady C) by pinfall	Goddesses of Stardom Tag League Blue Goddess Block match	13:28

==== Night 4 ====
The fourth night took place on November 12, 2025.

No.	Results	Stipulations	Times
1	SaoriPoi (Natsupoi and Saori Anou) defeated AquaStella (Yuna Mizumori and Mei Seira) by pinfall	Goddesses of Stardom Tag League Red Goddess Block match	11:30
2	Ranna Yagami and Momo Kohgo defeated Empress Nexus Venus (Hanako and Rian) by submission	Tag team match	8:37
3	Miyu Amasaki defeated Saya Kamitani and Waka Tsukiyama by pinfall	Three-way match	8:39
4	Mi Vida Loca (Suzu Suzuki, Rina Yamashita, Bozilla, and Akira Kurogane) defeated AZM, Kikyo Furusawa, and Sakurara (Aya Sakura and Sayaka Kurara) by submission	Eight-woman tag team match	12:44
5	BMI2000 (Natsuko Tora and Ruaka) defeated T-Hearts (Sareee and Miku Kanae) by pinfall	Goddesses of Stardom Tag League Red Goddess Block match	9:00
6	Anecon (Syuri and Saki Kashima) defeated New☆Sisters (Konami and Rina) by submission	Goddesses of Stardom Tag League Blue Goddess Block match	9:21
7	Reiwa Tokyo Towers (Ami Sohrei and Lady C) defeated Gorilla Trigger (Saya Iida and Bea Priestley) by pinfall	Goddesses of Stardom Tag League Blue Goddess Block match	13:21

==== Night 5 ====
The fifth night took place on November 13, 2025.

No.	Results	Stipulations	Times
1	T-Hearts (Sareee and Miku Kanae) defeated Mi Vida Loca (Bozilla and Akira Kurogane) by pinfall	Goddesses of Stardom Tag League Red Goddess Block match	10:14
2	H.A.T.E. (Natsuko Tora, Saya Kamitani, and Ruaka) defeated Stars (Saya Iida, Bea Priestley, Momo Kohgo) by pinfall	Six-woman tag team match	9:30
3	Reiwa Toyko Towers (Ami Sohrei and Lady C) defeated Ranna Yagami and Kikyo Furusawa by pinfall	Tag team match	13:01
4	Hanako and Rina Yamashita defeated Sakurara (Aya Sakura and Sayaka Kurara) by pinfall	Tag team match	11:40
5	New☆Sisters (Konami and Rina) defeated 02line (AZM and Miyu Amasaki) by submission	Goddesses of Stardom Tag League Blue Goddess Block match	11:33
6	AquaStella (Yuna Mizumori and Mei Seira) defeated Reckless Fatansy (Waka Tsukiyama and Rian) by pinfall	Goddesses of Stardom Tag League Blue Goddess Block match	14:39

==== Night 6 ====
The sixth night took place on November 15, 2025.

No.	Results	Stipulations	Times
1	Sakurara (Aya Sakura and Sayaka Kurara) defeated Reiwa Tokyo Towers (Ami Sohrei and Lady C) by pinfall	Goddesses of Stardom Tag League Blue Goddess Block match	10:22
2	Nanami defeated Kikyo Furusawa by submission	singles match	9:15
3	Gorilla Trigger (Saya Iida and Bea Priestley) defeated Rina Yamashita and Honoka by pinfall	tag team match	12:08
4	BMI2000 (Natsuko Tora and Ruaka) defeated Haruka Umesaki and Mizuki Kato by pinfall	tag team match	8:44
5	Blue Flame (Hina and Ranna Yagami) defeated Reckless Fantasy (Waka Tsukiyama and Rian) by pinfall	Goddesses of Stardom Tag League Red Goddess Block match	8:54
6	AquaStella (Yuna Mizumori and Mei Seira) vs. DLM (Teotleco and Osito) ended in a time-limit draw	Goddesses of Stardom Tag League Red Goddess Block match	15:00
7	Mega Skyscrapers (Hanako and Megan Bayne) defeated New☆Sisters (Konami and Rina) by pinfall	Goddesses of Stardom Tag League Blue Goddess Block match	13:59

==== Night 7 ====
The seventh night took place on November 16, 2025.

No.	Results	Stipulations	Times
1	AquaStella (Yuna Mizumori and Mei Seira) defeated Blue Flame (Hina and Ranna Yagami) by pinfall	Goddesses of Stardom Tag League Red Goddess Block match	7:50
2	Kaho Kobayashi, and Maika Ozaki, and Yuuri defeated Natsu Sumire and DLM (Teotleco and Osito) by pinfall	Six-woman tag team match	12:24
3	Sayaka Kurara and Kohaku defeated Mizuki Kato and Haruka Umesaki by pinfall	tag team match	10:44
4	BMI2000 (Natsuko Tora and Ruaka) defeated Reckless Fantasy (Waka Tsukiyama and Rian) by pinfall	Goddesses of Stardom Tag League Red Goddess Block match	10:25
5	Rina Amikura and Yuki Miyazaki defeated Rina Yamashita and Kikyo Furusawa by pinfall	Tag team match	12:36
6	Mega Skyscrapers (Hanako and Megan Bayne) defeated Gorilla Trigger (Saya Iida and Bea Priestley) by pinfall	Goddesses of Stardom Tag League Blue Goddess Block match	14:54
7	New☆Sisters (Konami and Rina) defeated Reiwa Toyko Towers (Ami Sohrei and Lady C) by pinfall	Goddesses of Stardom Tag League Blue Goddess Block match	14:28

==== Night 8 ====
The eighth night took place on November 23, 2025.

No.	Results	Stipulations	Times
1	Sakuraramon (Aya Sakura, Sayaka Kurara, Yuna Mizumori) defeated Neo Genesis (AZM, Miyu Amasaki, Mei Seira) by pinfall	Six-woman tag team match	8:36
2	Hanako and Momo Kohgo defeated Saya Kamitani and Kikyo Furusawa by pinfall	Tag team match	8:28
3	DLM (Teotleco and Osito) defeated Blue Flame (Hina and Ranna Yagami) by pinfall	Goddesses of Stardom Tag League Red Goddess Block match	8:49
4	Gorilla Trigger (Saya Iida and Bea Priestley defeated New☆Sisters (Konami and Rina) by pinfall	Goddesses of Stardom Tag League Blue Goddess Block match	11:37
5	Mi Vida Loca (Bozilla and Akira Kurogane) defeated BMI2000 (Natsuko Tora and Ruaka) by pinfall	Goddesses of Stardom Tag League Red Goddess Block match	10:00
6	SaoriPoi (Natsupoi and Saori Anou) defeated Reckless Fantasy (Waka Tsukiyama and Rian) by pinfall	Goddesses of Stardom Tag League Red Goddess Block match	10:32
7	Reiwa Toyko Towers (Ami Sohrei and Lady C) defeated Anecon (Syuri and Saki Kashima) by pinfall	Goddesses of Stardom Tag League Blue Goddess Block match	12:54

==== Night 9 ====
The ninth night took place on November 24, 2025.

No.	Results	Stipulations	Times
1	H.A.T.E. (Saya Kamitani, Konami, Rina) defeated Kikyo Furusawa and DLM (Teotleco and Osito) by pinfall	Six-woman tag team match	9:16
2	Reckless Fantasy (Waka Tsukiyama and Rian) defeated Saki Kashima and Momo Kohgo by pinfall	Tag team match	4:45
3	Blue Flame (Hina and Ranna Yagami) defeated Mi Vida Loca (Bozilla and Akira Kurogane) by pinfall	Goddesses of Stardom Tag League Red Goddess Block match	9:44
4	BMI2000 (Natsuko Tora and Ruaka) defeated SaoriPoi (Natsupoi and Saori Anou) by pinfall	Goddesses of Stardom Tag League Red Goddess Block match	12:10
5	Mega Skyscrapers (Hanako and Megan Bayne) defeated 02line (AZM and Miyu Amasaki) by pinfall	Goddesses of Stardom Tag League Blue Goddess Block match	6:59
6	Reiwa Tokyo Towers (Ami Sohrei and Lady C) defeated Bloody Girls’ School (Suzu Suzuki and Rina Yamashita) by count-out	Goddesses of Stardom Tag League Blue Goddess Block match	11:34
7	Sakurara (Aya Sakura and Sayaka Kurara) defeated Gorilla Trigger (Saya Iida and Bea Priestley) by pinfall	Goddesses of Stardom Tag League Blue Goddess Block match	13:38

==== Night 10 ====
The tenth night took place on November 26, 2025.

No.	Results	Stipulations	Times
1	Stars (Saya Iida and Momo Kohgo) defeated Reckless Fantasy (Waka Tsukiyama and Rian) by pinfall	Tag team match	9:12
2	Bea Priestley and Kikyo Furusawa defeated Ranna Yagami and Ema Maishima by submission	Tag team match	7:53
3	BMI2000 (Natsuko Tora and Ruaka) defeated AquaStella (Yuna Mizumori and Mei Seira) by pinfall	Goddesses of Stardom Tag League Red Goddess Block match	6:41
4	02line (AZM and Miyu Amasaki) defeated Reiwa Tokyo Towers (Ami Sohrei and Lady C) by pinfall	Goddesses of Stardom Tag League Blue Goddess Block match	9:55
5	Anecon (Syuri and Saki Kashima) defeated Sakurara (Aya Sakura and Sayaka Kurara) by pinfall	Goddesses of Stardom Tag League Blue Goddess Block match	10:21
6	T-Hearts (Sareee and Miku Kanae) defeated DLM (Teotleco and Osito) by submission	Goddesses of Stardom Tag League Red Goddess Block match	9:27
7	Bloody Girls’ School (Suzu Suzuki and Rina Yamashita) defeated Mega Skyscrapers (Hanako and Megan Bayne) by pinfall	Goddesses of Stardom Tag League Blue Goddess Block match	13:14
8	Mi Vida Loca (Bozilla and Akira Kurogane) defeated SaoriPoi (Natsupoi and Saori Anou) by pinfall	Goddesses of Stardom Tag League Red Goddess Block match	14:32

==== Night 11 ====
The eleventh night took place on November 28, 2025.

No.	Results	Stipulations	Times
1	Saya Kamitani defeated Ema Maishima by submission	Singles match	9:12
2	Mei Seira defeated Yuna Mizumori and Momo Kohgo by pinfall	Three-way match	5:44
3	BMI2000 (Natsuko Tora and Ruaka) defeated DLM (Teotleco and Osito) by pinfall	Goddesses of Stardom Tag League Red Goddess Block match	10:10
4	Bloody Girls’ School (Suzu Suzuki and Rina Yamashita) defeated New☆Sisters (Konami and Rina) by pinfall	Goddesses of Stardom Tag League Blue Goddess Block match	11:44
5	Mi Vida Loca (Bozilla and Akira Kurogane) defeated Reckless Fantasy (Waka Tsukiyama and Rian) by submission	Goddesses of Stardom Tag League Red Goddess Block match	8:53
6	Anecon (Syuri and Saki Kashima) vs. Mega Skyscrapers (Hanako and Megan Bayne) ended in a time-limit draw	Goddesses of Stardom Tag League Blue Goddess Block match	15:00
7	Sakurara (Aya Sakura and Sayaka Kurara) defeated 02line (AZM and Miyu Amasaki) by pinfall	Goddesses of Stardom Tag League Blue Goddess Block match	10:26
8	T-Hearts (Sareee and Miku Kanae) defeated SaoriPoi (Saori Anou and Natsupoi) by pinfall	Goddesses of Stardom Tag League Red Goddess Block match	12:04

==== Night 12 ====
The twelfth night took place on November 29, 2025.

No.	Results	Stipulations	Times
1	PsyQueen (Saya Kamitani and Konami) defeated Syuri and Saori Anou by pinfall	Tag team match	7:20
2	Megan Bayne defeated Rina and Hina by pinfall	Three-way match	9:04
3	DLM (Teotleco and Osito) defeated Momo Kohgo and Kikyo Furusawa) by submission	Tag team match	7:17
4	Neo Genesis (AZM, Mei Seira, and Miyu Amasaki) defeated Ema Maishima and Cosmic Tropical Fairy Super Angel (Natsupoi and Yuna Mizumori) by pinfall	Six-woman tag team match	8:37
5	Empress Nexus Venus (Hanako, Waka Tsukiyama, and Rian) defeated God's Eye (Ami Sohrei, Lady C, and Ranna Yagami) by pinfall	Six-woman tag team match	10:33
6	BMI2000 (Natsuko Tora and Ruaka) vs. Bloody Girls’ School (Suzu Suzuki and Rina Yamashita) ended in a double countout	Tag team match	10:19
7	Mi Vida Loca (Bozilla and Akira Kurogane) defeated T-Hearts (Sareee and Miku Kanae) by pinfall	Goddesses of Stardom Tag League Playoffs match	15:09
8	Sakurara (Aya Sakura and Sayaka Kurara) defeated Gorilla Trigger (Saya Iida and Bea Priestley) by pinfall	Goddesses of Stardom Tag League Playoffs match	13:38

==== Night 13 ====
The thirteenth and final night took place on November 30, 2025.

No.	Results	Stipulations	Times
1	Sakurara (Aya Sakura and Sayaka Kurara) defeated Mega Skyscrapers (Megan Bayne and Hanako) by pinfall	Goddesses of Stardom Tag League Semifinals match	10:55
2	BMI2000 (Natsuko Tora and Ruaka) defeated Mi Vida Loca (Bozilla and Akira Kurogane) by submssion	Goddesses of Stardom Tag League Semifinals match	10:30
3	Reckless Fantasy (Waka Tsukiyama and Rian) defeated New☆Sisters (Konami and Rina) by submission	Tag team match	0:57
4	Suzu Suzuki defeated Lady C and Ema Maishima by pinfall	Three-way match	4:42
5	Neo Genesis (AZM, Mei Seira, and Miyu Amasaki) defeated Kikyo Furusawa and DLM (Teotleco and Osita) by pinfall	Six-woman tag team match	5:09
6	God's Eye (Ami Sohrei, Tomoka Inaba, Kiyoka Kotatsu, and Hina) defeated Stars (Saya Iida, Bea Priestley, Momo Kohgo, and Yuria Hime) by submission	Eight-woman tag team match	9:24
7	Cosmic Tropical Fairy Super Angel (Natsupoi and Yuna Mizumori) defeated T-Hearts (Sareee and Miku Kanae) by pinfall	Tag team match	9:30
8	God's Eye (Syuri and Ranna Yagami) defeated H.A.T.E. (Saya Kamitani and Azusa Inaba) by pinfall	Tag team match	9:44
9	Sakurara (Aya Sakura and Sayaka Kurara) defeated BMI2000 (Natsuko Tora and Ruaka) by pinfall	Goddesses of Stardom Tag League Finals	17:25

== 2026 ==
Goddesses of Stardom Tag League
- 2026

Tournament information
- Sport: Professional wrestling
- Location: Japan
- Dates: November 1, 2026–November 29, 2026
- Tournament format: Two-block round-robin
- Host: World Wonder Ring Stardom
- Participants: 18

The 2026 edition of the tournament will start on November 1 and end on November 29, 2026.

=== Overview ===
Current Standings
Red Goddess Block		Blue Goddess Block	
Trouble Friends (Starlight Kid and Maki Itoh)	10	FWC (Hazuki and Koguma)	9
Sakurara (Aya Sakura and Sayaka Kurara)	10	Bloody Girls’ School (Suzu Suzuki and Rina Yamashita)	7
BLACK SWAN (Momo Watanabe and Saya Kamitani)	8	New☆Sisters (Konami and Rina)	7
Hai High Mate (Maika and Hanako)	7	BMI2000 (Natsuko Tora and Ruaka)	7
Super Senyu Z (Saori Anou and Fuwa-chan)	7	Gori N' Roses (Saya Iida and Utami Hayashishita)	7
Feather⭐︎Moon (Hanan and Waka Tsukiyama)	6	Natsupoi and Rian	6
M&E SPIRIX (Mei Seira and Ema Maishima)	4	Las Infernales (Dark Silueta and Valkyria)	5
Kiyo Kikyo (Kikyo Furusawa and Kiyoka Kotatsu)	4	Team Classroom (Lady C and Hina)	5
Tropical⭐︎Haisai (Yuna Mizumori and Anne Kanaya)	4	Iron Beat (Ranna Yagami and Akira Kurogane)	3

Red Goddess Block	Hanan Tsukiyama	Maika Hanako	Sakura Kurara	Mizumori Kanaya	Seira Maishima	Anou Fuwa	Kid Itoh	Furusawa Kotatsu	Watanabe Kamitani
Hanan Tsukiyama	—N/a		Sakura; Kurara (11:22)	Hanan; Tsukiyama (2:27)		Hanan; Tsukiyama (8:55)	Kid; Itoh (10:22)	Hanan; Tsukiyama (4:06)	Watanabe; Kamitani (10:40)
Maika Hanako		—N/a	Sakura; Kurara (10:27)		Maika; Hanako (10:17)	Maika; Hanako (9:50)	Draw (15:00)	Maika; Hanako (9:02)	Watanabe; Kamitani (13:00)
Sakura Kurara	Sakura; Kurara (11:22)	Sakura; Kurara (10:27)	—N/a	Sakura; Kurara (10:32)	Sakura; Kurara (8:53)	Anou; Fuwa (11:50)	Kid; Itoh (12:18)	Sakura; Kurara (6:55)	
Mizumori Kanaya	Hanan; Tsukiyama (2:27)		Sakura; Kurara (10:32)	—N/a	Mizumori; Kanaya (5:37)	Anou; Fuwa (9:56)	Mizumori; Kanaya (8:54)	Furusawa; Kotatsu (8:07)	Watanabe; Kamitani (8:48)
Seira Maishima		Maika; Hanako (10:17)	Sakura; Kurara (8:53)	Mizumori; Kanaya (5:37)	—N/a		Seira; Maishima (10:24)	Seira; Maishima (5:12)	Watanabe; Kamitani (11:06)
Anou Fuwa	Hanan; Tsukiyama (8:55)	Maika; Hanako (9:50)	Anou; Fuwa (11:50)	Anou; Fuwa (9:56)		—N/a	Draw (11:22)	Furusawa; Kotatsu (9:06)	Anou; Fuwa (12:14)
Kid Itoh	Kid; Itoh (10:22)	Draw (15:00)	Kid; Itoh (12:18)	Mizumori; Kanaya (8:54)	Seira; Maishima (10:24)	Draw (11:22)	—N/a	Kid; Itoh (13:08)	Kid; Itoh (13:31)
Furusawa Kotatsu	Hanan; Tsukiyama (4:06)	Maika; Hanako (9:02)	Sakura; Kurara (6:55)	Furusawa; Kotatsu (8:07)	Seira; Maishima (5:12)	Furusawa; Kotatsu (9:06)	Kid; Itoh (13:08)	—N/a	
Watanabe Kamitani	Watanabe; Kamitani (10:40)	Watanabe; Kamitani (13:00)		Watanabe; Kamitani (8:48)	Watanabe; Kamitani (11:06)	Anou; Fuwa (12:14)	Kid; Itoh (13:31)		—N/a

Blue Goddess Block	Iida Hayashishita	Lady C Hina	Suzuki Yamashita	Hazuki Koguma	Natsupoi Rian	Yagami Kurogane	Silueta Valkyria	Tora Ruaka	Konami Rina
Iida Hayashishita	—N/a	Draw (15:00)	Iida; Hayashishita (9:50)	Hazuki; Koguma (12:09)		Iida; Hayashishita (10:26)	Iida; Hayashishita (10:25)	Tora; Ruaka (12:37)	
Lady C Hina	Draw (15:00)	—N/a		Hazuki; Koguma (12:22)	Lady C Hina (9:41)	Lady C Hina (10:34)	Silueta; Valkyria (8:26)	Tora; Ruaka (9:54)	Konami; Rina (10:45)
Suzuki Yamashita	Iida; Hayashishita (9:50)		—N/a		Natsupoi; Rian (8:53)	Draw (15:00)	Suzuki; Yamashita (9:33)	Suzuki; Yamashita (12:10)	Suzuki; Yamashita (12:40)
Hazuki Koguma	Hazuki; Koguma (12:09)	Hazuki; Koguma (12:22)		—N/a	Hazuki; Koguma (7:09)	Hazuki; Koguma (10:57)	Silueta; Valkyria (11:43)	Draw (15:00)	Konami; Rina (11:27)
Natsupoi Rian		Lady C Hina (9:41)	Natsupoi; Rian (8:53)	Hazuki; Koguma (7:09)	—N/a	Yagami; Kurogane (8:32)	Natsupoi; Rian (10:14)		Natsupoi; Rian (10:14)
Yagami Kurogane	Iida; Hayashishita (10:26)	Lady C Hina (10:34)	Draw (15:00)	Hazuki; Koguma (10:57)	Yagami; Kurogane (8:32)	—N/a		Tora; Ruaka (9:10)	
Silueta Valkyria	Iida; Hayashishita (10:25)	Silueta; Valkyria (8:26)	Suzuki; Yamashita (9:33)	Silueta; Valkyria (11:43)	Natsupoi; Rian (10:14)		—N/a		Draw (12:09)
Tora Ruaka	Tora; Ruaka (12:37)	Tora; Ruaka (9:54)	Suzuki; Yamashita (12:10)	Draw (15:00)		Tora; Ruaka (9:10)		—N/a	Konami; Rina (10:20)
Konami Rina		Konami; Rina (10:45)	Suzuki; Yamashita (12:40)	Konami; Rina (11:27)	Natsupoi; Rian (10:14)		Draw (12:09)	Konami; Rina (10:20)	—N/a

Semifinals
R1
B2
B1
R2

Finals

==== Night 1 ====
The first night took place on November 1, 2026.

No.	Results	Stipulations	Times
1	Super Senyu Z (Saori Anou and Fuwa-chan) defeated Sakurara (Aya Sakura and Sayaka Kurara) by pinfall	Goddesses of Stardom Tag League Red Goddess Block match	11:50
2	Feather⭐︎Moon (Hanan and Waka Tsukiyama) defeated Kiyo Kikyo (Kikyo Furusawa and Kiyoka Kotatsu) by pinfall	Goddesses of Stardom Tag League Red Goddess Block match	4:06
3	Yuna Mizumori defeated Anne Kanaya by pinfall	singles match	7:07
4	Gori N’ Roses (Saya Iida and Utami Hayashishita) defeated Los Infernales (Dark Silueta and Valkyria) by pinfall	Goddesses of Stardom Tag League Blue Goddess Block match	10:25
5	Natsupoi defeated Koguma and Yuria Hime by submission	Three-way match	3:25
6	Team Classroom (Lady C and Hina) defeated Iron Beat (Ranna Yagami and Akira Kurogane) by pinfall	Goddesses of Stardom Tag League Blue Goddess Block match	10:34
7	H.A.T.E. (Bea Priestley, Konami, Rina) defeated Hazuki, Rian and Matoi Hamabe by pinfall	Six-woman tag team match	7:12
8	M&E Spirix (Mei Seira and Ema Maishima) defeated Trouble Friends (Starlight Kid and Maki Itoh) by pinfall	Goddesses of Stardom Tag League Red Goddess Block match	10:24
9	Bloody Girls’ School (Suzu Suzuki and Rina Yamashita) defeated BMI2000 (Natsuko Tora and Ruaka) by pinfall	Goddesses of Stardom Tag League Blue Goddess Block match	12:10
10	Black Swan (Momo Watanabe and Saya Kamitani) defeated Hai High Mate (Maika and Hanako) by pinfall	Goddesses of Stardom Tag League Red Goddess Block match	13:30

==== Night 2 ====
The second night took place on November 3, 2026.

No.	Results	Stipulations	Times
1	Black Swan (Momo Watanabe and Saya Kamitani) defeated M&E Spirix (Mei Seira and Ema Maishima) by pinfall	Goddesses of Stardom Tag League Red Goddess Block match	11:06
2	Super Senyu Z (Saori Anou and Fuwa-chan) defeated Tropical⭐︎Haisai (Yuna Mizumori and Anne Kanaya) by pinfall	Goddesses of Stardom Tag League Red Goddess Block match	9:56
3	Las Infernales (Dark Silueta and Valkyria) defeated Stars (Hanan and Yuria Hime) by pinfall	Tag team match	8:08
4	Team Classroom (Lady C and Hina) defeated Natsupoi and Rian by pinfall	Goddesses of Stardom Tag League Blue Goddess Block match	9:41
5	H.A.T.E. (Konami and Rina) defeated Iron Beat (Ranna Yagami and Akira Kurogane) and Stars (Waka Tsukiyama and Matoi Hamabe) by pinfall	three-way tag team match	9:30
6	Trouble Friends (Starlight Kid and Maki Itoh) defeated Kiyo Kikyo (Kikyo Furusawa and Kiyoka Kotatsu) by submission	Goddesses of Stardom Tag League Red Goddess Block match	13:08
7	Sakurara (Aya Sakura and Sayaka Kurara) defeated Hai High Mate (Maika and Hanako) by pinfall	Goddesses of Stardom Tag League Red Goddess Block match	10:27
8	FWC (Hazuki and Koguma) vs. BMI2000 (Natsuko Tora and Ruaka) ended in a time-limit draw	Goddesses of Stardom Tag League Blue Goddess Block match	15:00
9	Gori N’ Roses (Saya Iida and Utami Hayashishita) defeated Bloody Girls’ School (Suzu Suzuki and Rina Yamashita) by pinfall	Goddesses of Stardom Tag League Blue Goddess Block match	9:50

==== Night 3 ====
The third night took place on November 8, 2026.

No.	Results	Stipulations	Times
1	Tropical⭐︎Haisai (Yuna Mizumori defeated Trouble Friends (Starlight Kid and Maki Itoh) by pinfall	Goddesses of Stardom Tag League Red Goddess Block match	8:54
2	Ruaka defeated Matoi Hamabe by pinfall	singles match	8:15
3	God's Eye (Ami Sohrei and Syuri) defeated Mi Vida Loca (Suzu Suzuki and Rina Yamashita) and Neo Genesis (Mei Seira and Ema Maishima) by pinfall	Three-way tag team match	3:41
4	FWC (Hazuki and Koguma) defeated Team Classroom (Lady C and Hina) by pinfall	Goddesses of Stardom Tag League Blue Goddess Block match	12:22
5	H.A.T.E. (Saya Kamitani, Momo Watanabe and Natsuko Tora) defeated Natsupoi, Rian and Yuria Hime by pinfall	Six-woman tag team match	7:54
6	Gori N’ Roses (Saya Iida and Utami Hayashishita) defeated Iron Beat (Ranna Yagami and Akira Kurogane) by pinfall	Goddesses of Stardom Tag League Blue Goddess Block match	10:26
7	Kiyo Kikyo (Kikyo Furusawa and Kiyoka Kotatsu) defeated Super Senyu Z (Saori Anou and Fuwa-chan) by pinfall	Goddesses of Stardom Tag League Red Goddess Block match	9:06
8	Las Infernales (Dark Silueta and Valkyria) vs. New☆Sisters (Konami and Rina) ended in a double count-out	Goddesses of Stardom Tag League Blue Goddess Block match	12:09
9	Sakurara (Aya Sakura and Sayaka Kurara) defeated Feather⭐︎Moon (Hanan and Waka Tsukiyama) by pinfall	Goddesses of Stardom Tag League Red Goddess Block match	11:22

==== Night 4 ====
The fourth night took place on November 11, 2026.

No.	Results	Stipulations	Times
1	Natsuko Tora defeated Matoi Hamabe by pinfall	singles match	5:40
2	Sakurara (Aya Sakura and Sayaka Kurara) defeated Kiyo Kikyo (Kikyo Furusawa and Kiyoka Kotatsu) by pinfall	Goddesses of Stardom Tag League Red Goddess Block match	6:55
3	Stars (Hanan and Waka Tsukiyama) and Yuna Mizumori defeated Neo Genesis (AZM, Miyu Amasaki and Ema Maishima) by pinfall	Six-woman tag team match	2:53
4	Iron Beat (Ranna Yagami and Akira Kurogane) defeated Natsupoi and Rian by pinfall	Goddesses of Stardom Tag League Blue Goddess Block match	8:32
5	Bloody Girls’ School (Suzu Suzuki and Rina Yamashita) defeated Las Infernales (Silueta and Valkyria) by pinfall	Goddesses of Stardom Tag League Blue Goddess Block match	9:33
6	Mei Seira defeated Ruaka and Yuria Hime and Anne Kanaya by pinfall	Four-way match	3:04
7	Hai High Mate (Maika and Hanako) defeated Super Senyu Z (Saori Anou and Fuwa-chan) by pinfall	Goddesses of Stardom Tag League Red Goddess Block match	9:50
8	New☆Sisters (Konami and Rina) defeated Team Classroom (Lady C and Hina) by pinfall	Goddesses of Stardom Tag League Blue Goddess Block match	10:45
9	FWC (Hazuki and Koguma) defeated Gori N’ Roses (Saya Iida and Utami Hayashishita) by pinfall	Goddesses of Stardom Tag League Blue Goddess Block match	12:09
10	Trouble Friends (Starlight Kid and Maki Itoh) defeated Black Swan (Momo Watanabe and Saya Kamitani) by pinfall	Goddesses of Stardom Tag League Red Goddess Block match	13:31

==== Night 5 ====
The fifth night took place on November 14, 2026.

No.	Results	Stipulations	Times
1	BMI2000 (Natsuko Tora and Ruaka) defeated Team Classroom (Lady C and Hina) by pinfall	Goddesses of Stardom Tag League Blue Goddess Block match	9:54
2	Stars (Maika and Matoi Hamabe) defeated Ranna Yagami and Akira Kurogane by pinfall	Tag team match	5:55
3	Kiyo Kikyo (Kikyo Furusawa and Kiyoka Kotatsu) defeated Tropical⭐︎Haisai (Yuna Mizumori and Anne Kanaya by submission	Goddesses of Stardom Tag League Red Goddess Block match	8:07
4	H.A.T.E. (Momo Watanabe and Saya Kamitani) and Las Infernales (Dark Silueta and Valkyria) defeated Stars (Saya Iida, Utami Hayashishita, Hanako and Yuria Hime) by pinfall	Eight-woman tag team match	8:00
5	Sakurara (Aya Sakura and Sayaka Kurara) defeated M&E Spirix (Mei Seira and Ema Maishima) by pinfall	Goddesses of Stardom Tag League Red Goddess Block match	8:53
6	Trouble Friends (Starlight Kid and Maki Itoh) defeated Feather⭐︎Moon (Hanan and Waka Tsukiyama) by pinfall	Goddesses of Stardom Tag League Red Goddess Block match	10:22
7	Natsupoi and Rian defeated Bloody Girls’ School (Suzu Suzuki and Rina Yamashita) by pinfall	Goddesses of Stardom Tag League Blue Goddess Block match	8:53
8	New☆Sisters (Konami and Rina) defeated FWC (Hazuki and Koguma) by pinfall	Goddesses of Stardom Tag League Blue Goddess Block match	11:27

==== Night 6 ====
The sixth night took place on November 15, 2026.

No.	Results	Stipulations	Times
1	Trouble Friends (Starlight Kid and Maki Itoh) vs. Super Senyu Z (Saori Anou and Fuwa-chan) ended in a double count-out	Goddesses of Stardom Tag League Red Goddess Block match	11:22
2	Black Swan (Momo Watanabe and Saya Kamitani) defeated Tropical⭐︎Haisai (Yuna Mizumori and Anne Kanaya) by pinfall	Goddesses of Stardom Tag League Red Goddess Block match	8:48
3	Las Infernales (Dark Silueta and Valkyria) defeated Stars (Yuria Hime and Matoi Hamabe) by submission	Tag team match	7:00
4	Waka Tsukiyama defeated Mei Seira and Lady C by pinfall	Three-way match	5:12
5	Stars (Maika and Hanako) defeated Kiyo Kikyo (Kikyo Furusawa and Kiyoka Kotatsu) by pinfall	Goddesses of Stardom Tag League Red Goddess Block match	9:02
6	Stars (Hanan, Saya Iida and Utami Hayashishita) defeated Sakurara (Aya Sakura and Sayaka Kurara) and Ema Maishima by pinfall	Six-woman tag team match	7:17
7	FWC (Hazuki and Koguma) defeated Natsupoi and Rian by pinfall	Goddesses of Stardom Tag League Blue Goddess Block match	7:09
8	New☆Sisters (Konami and Rina) defeated BMI2000 (Natsuko Tora and Ruaka) by pinfall	Goddesses of Stardom Tag League Blue Goddess Block match	10:20
9	Blood Girls’ School (Suzu Suzuki and Rina Yamashita) vs. Iron Beat (Ranna Yagami and Akira Kurogane) ended in a time-limit draw	Goddesses of Stardom Tag League Blue Goddess Block match	15:00

==== Night 7 ====
The seventh night took place on November 18, 2026.

No.	Results	Stipulations	Times
1	Sakurara (Aya Sakura and Sayaka Kurara) defeated Natsupoi and Rian by pinfall	Tag team match	10:09
2	M&E Spirix (Mei Seira and Ema Maishima) defeated Kiyo Kikyo (Kikyo Furusawa and Kiyoka Kotatsu) by pinfall	Goddesses of Stardom Tag League Red Goddess Block match	5:12
3	God's Eye (Lady C, Hina and Ranna Yagami) defeated Akira Kurogane and Stars (Yuria Hime and Matoi Hamabe) by pinfall	Six-woman tag team match	6:43
4	Las Infernales (Dark Silueta and Valkyria) defeated FWC (Hazuki and Koguma) by pinfall	Goddesses of Stardom Tag League Blue Goddess Block match	11:43
5	Feather☆Moon (Hanan and Waka Tsukiyama) defeated Tropical☆Haisai (Yuna Mizumori and Anne Kanaya) by pinfall	Goddesses of Stardom Tag League Red Goddess Block match	2:27
6	Super Senyu Z (Saori Anou and Fuwa-chan) defeated Black Swan (Momo Watanabe and Saya Kamitani) by pinfall	Goddesses of Stardom Tag League Red Goddess Block match	12:14
7	Trouble Friends (Starlight Kid and Maki Itoh) vs. Hai High Mate (Maika and Hanako) ended in a time-limit draw	Goddesses of Stardom Tag League Red Goddess Block match	15:00
8	Bloody Girls’ School (Suzu Suzuki and Rina Yamashita) defeated New☆Sisters (Konami and Rina) by pinfall	Goddesses of Stardom Tag League Blue Goddess Block match	12:40
9	BMI2000 (Natsuko Tora and Ruaka) defeated Gori N’ Roses (Saya Iida and Utami Hayashishita) by pinfall	Goddesses of Stardom Tag League Blue Goddess Block match	12:37

==== Night 8 ====
The eighth night took place on November 21, 2026.

No.	Results	Stipulations	Times
1	Rina Yamashita defeated Matoi Hamabe by pinfall	singles match	9:14
2	Tropical☆Haisai (Yuna Mizumori and Anne Kanaya) defeated M&E Spirix (Mei Seira and Ema Maishima) by pinfall	Goddesses of Stardom Tag League Red Goddess Block match	5:37
3	Las Infernales (Dark Silueta and Valkyria) defeated Team Classroom (Lady C and Hina) by pinfall	Goddesses of Stardom Tag League Blue Goddess Block match	8:26
4	Suzu Suzuki defeated Utami Hayashishita and Kikyo Furusawa by pinfall	Three-way match	5:44
5	Feather☆Moon (Hanan and Waka Tsukiyama) defeated Super Senyu Z (Saori Anou and Fuwa-chan) by pinfall	Goddesses of Stardom Tag League Red Goddess Block match	8:55
6	H.A.T.E. (Natsuko Tora, Saya Kamitani, Momo Watanabe and Ruaka) defeated Stars (Saya Iida, Utami Hayashishita, Hanako and Yuria Hime) by pinfall	Eight-woman tag team match	8:07
7	FWC (Hazuki and Koguma) defeated Iron Beat (Ranna Yagami and Akira Kurogane) by pinfall	Goddesses of Stardom Tag League Blue Goddess Block match	10:57
8	Natsupoi and Rian defeated New☆Sisters (Konami and Rina) by pinfall	Goddesses of Stardom Tag League Blue Goddess Block match	10:14
9	Trouble Friends (Starlight Kid and Maki Itoh) defeated Sakurara (Aya Sakura and Sayaka Kurara) by pinfall	Goddesses of Stardom Tag League Red Goddess Block match	12:18

== See also ==
- 5Star Grand Prix Tournament
- Triangle Derby I
- Dual Shock Wave
- Futari wa Princess Max Heart Tournament
- Super Junior Tag League
- Tag League the Best
- World Tag League
