= Stardom New Blood 25 =

2025 World Wonder Ring Stardom event

New Blood 25
- Promotional artwork of the event
- Promotion: World Wonder Ring Stardom
- Date: October 17, 2025
- City: Osaka, Japan
- Venue: Azalea Taisho Hall
- Attendance: 225

Event chronology
← Previous; Stardom to the World	Next → Historic X-Over in Guangzhou

New Blood chronology
← Previous; New Blood 24	Next → New Blood 26

Stardom New Blood 25 (スターダム ニュー ブラッド 25, Sutādamu nyū Buraddo 25) was a professional wrestling event promoted by World Wonder Ring Stardom. The event took place on October 17, 2025, in Osaka, Japan at the Azalea Taisho Hall.

== Production ==
=== Background ===
"New Blood" is a series of events that mainly focus on matches where rookie wrestlers, usually with three or fewer years of in-ring experience, evolve. Besides wrestlers from Stardom, various superstars from multiple promotions of the Japanese independent scene are invited to compete in bouts that are usually going under the stipulation of singles or tag team matches.

The show featured professional wrestling matches that result from scripted storylines, where wrestlers portray villains, heroes, or less distinguishable characters in the scripted events that build tension and culminate in a wrestling match or series of matches.

=== Event ===
The event started with the singles confrontation between Kikyo Furusawa and Ema Maishima, solded with the victory of the latter. Next up, Mei Seira picked up a victory over Yuki Mashiro in singles competition. The third bout saw Ranna Yagami and Kiyoka Kotatsu outmatch Fukigen Death and Ram Kaicho in tag team competition. Next up, Rina Yamashita defeated Akira Kurogane in singles competition.

In the main event, Yuna Mizumori, Aya Sakura and Sayaka Kurara defeated Waka Tsukiyama, Hanako and Rian in six-woman tag team competition. After the bout concluded, Sakura and Kurara furtherly challenged Hanako and Tsukiyama for the New Blood Tag Team Championship.

== Results ==
No.	Results	Stipulations	Times
1	Ema Maishima defeated Kikyo Furusawa	Singles match	7:22
2	Mei Seira defeated Yuki Mashiro	Singles match	8:07
3	God's Eye (Ranna Yagami and Kiyoka Kotatsu) defeated Fukigen Death and Ram Kaicho	Tag team match	8:24
4	Rina Yamashita defeated Akira Kurogane	Singles match	13:58
5	Sakuraramon (Yuna Mizumori, Aya Sakura and Sayaka Kurara) defeated Empress Nexus Venus (Waka Tsukiyama, Hanako and Rian)	Six-woman tag team match	16:48
