= Stardom Crimson Nightmare =

2025 World Wonder Ring Stardom event

- Promotional poster of the event featuring Saya Kamitani and Momo Watanabe
- Promotion: World Wonder Ring Stardom
- Date: November 3, 2025
- City: Tokyo, Japan
- Venue: Ota City General Gymnasium
- Attendance: 2,467

Event chronology
← Previous; New Blood 26	Next → New Blood 27

Crimson Nightmare chronology
← Previous; First	Next → 2026

Stardom Crimson Nightmare (スターダムクリムゾンナイトメア, Sutādamukurimuzon'naitomea) was a professional wrestling event promoted by World Wonder Ring Stardom. The event took place on November 3, 2025, in Tokyo, Japan, at the Ota City General Gymnasium.

Eight matches were contested at the event, including one on the pre-show. In the main event, Saya Kamitani defeated 2025 5 Star Grand Prix winner Momo Watanabe in a Winner Takes All match to retain the World of Stardom Championship and Strong Women's Championship, Konami defeated Starlight Kid to win the Wonder of Stardom Championship, Mei Seira defeated Hazuki to retain the High Speed Championship, and Bozilla defeated Saki Kashima.

== Production ==
=== Background ===
The show featured professional wrestling matches that result from scripted storylines, where wrestlers portray villains, heroes, or less distinguishable characters in the scripted events that build tension and culminate in a wrestling match or series of matches.

=== Event ===
The event started with the preshow four-way confrontation between winner Rian and Ranna Yagami, Kikyo Furusawa and Fukigen Death.

In the first main card bout, Natsupoi, Saori Anou, Yuna Mizumori, Aya Sakura, Sayaka Kurara picked up a victory over the team of Syuri, Ami Sohrei, Hina, Lady C, Kiyoka Kotatsu, and the team of Suzu Suzuki, Rina Yamashita, Itsuki Aoki, Akira Kurogane and Ema Maishima in three-way tag team competition. Next up, AZM and Miyu Amasaki outmached Hanako and Waka Tsukiyama in tag team competition. In the fourth match, Saya Iida, Momo Kohgo, Bea Priestley defeated Natsuko Tora, Ruaka, Rina in six-woman tag team competition. Next up, Bozilla defeated Saki Kashima in singles competition. The sixth bout saw Mei Seira defeat Hazuki to secure the ninth consecutive defense of the High Speed Championship in that respective reign. In the semi main event, Konami defeated Starlight Kid to win the Wonder of Stardom Championship, ending the latter's reign at 309 days and six defenses.

In the main event, Saya Kamitani defeated 2025 Grand Prix Winner Momo Watanabe in a winner takes all bout to retain both the World of Stardom Championship and Strong Women's Championship. Kamitani secured the seventh consecutive defense of the World title and the first defense of the Strong title in those respective reigns. After the bout concluded, Syuri challenged Kamitani at a winner takes all match for both her IWGP Women's Championship and Kamitani's Strong Women's Championship at Wrestle Kingdom 20. Then, Saori Anou came out to challenge Kamitani for the World of Stardom Championship at Dream Queendom 2025.

== Results ==
No.	Results	Stipulations	Times
1^{P}	Rian defeated Ranna Yagami, Kikyo Furusawa and Fukigen Death by pinfall	Four-way match	6:18
2	Cosmic Angels (Natsupoi, Saori Anou, Yuna Mizumori, Aya Sakura, Sayaka Kurara) defeated God's Eye (Syuri, Ami Sohrei, Hina, Lady C, Kiyoka Kotatsu) and Mi Vida Loca (Suzu Suzuki, Rina Yamashita, Itsuki Aoki, Akira Kurogane) and Ema Maishima by pinfall	Three-way tag team match	11:33
3	02line (AZM and Miyu Amasaki) defeated Rice or Bread (Hanako and Waka Tsukiyama) by pinfall	Tag team match	8:21
4	Stars (Saya Iida, Momo Kohgo, Bea Priestley) defeated H.A.T.E. (Natsuko Tora, Ruaka, Rina) by pinfall	Six-woman tag team match	9:55
5	Bozilla defeated Saki Kashima by submission	Singles match	11:29
6	Mei Seira (c) defeated Hazuki by pinfall	Singles match for the High Speed Championship	10:58
7	Konami defeated Starlight Kid (c) by referee stoppage	Singles match for the Wonder of Stardom Championship	21:15
8	Saya Kamitani (c) defeated Momo Watanabe by pinfall	Winner Takes All match for the World of Stardom Championship and Strong Women's Championship	21:31
(c) / – the champion(s) heading into the match; P / – the match was broadcast on the pre-show
