= Stardom New Blood 24 =

2025 World Wonder Ring Stardom event

New Blood 24
- Promotional artwork of the event
- Promotion: World Wonder Ring Stardom
- Date: October 4, 2025
- City: Tokyo, Japan
- Venue: Belle Salle Takadanobaba
- Attendance: 216

Event chronology
← Previous; Stardom to the World	Next → Historic X-Over in Guangzhou

New Blood chronology
← Previous; New Blood 23	Next → New Blood 25

Stardom New Blood 24 (スターダム ニュー ブラッド 24, Sutādamu nyū Buraddo 24) was a professional wrestling event promoted by World Wonder Ring Stardom. The event took place on October 4, 2025, in Tokyo, Japan at the Belle Salle Takadanobaba.

== Production ==
=== Background ===
"New Blood" is a series of events that mainly focus on matches where rookie wrestlers, usually with three or fewer years of in-ring experience, evolve. Besides wrestlers from Stardom, various superstars from multiple promotions of the Japanese independent scene are invited to compete in bouts that are usually going under the stipulation of singles or tag team matches.

The show featured professional wrestling matches that result from scripted storylines, where wrestlers portray villains, heroes, or less distinguishable characters in the scripted events that build tension and culminate in a wrestling match or series of matches.

=== Event ===
The event started with the singles confrontation between Ema Maishima and Kikyo Furusawa which ended in a time-limit draw. Next up, Yuki Mashiro picked up a victory over Yuria Hime and Fukigen Death in three-way competition. The third bout saw Waka Tsukiyama and Rian outmatch Riara and Echika Miyabi in tag team competition. Next up, Hina defeated Kiyoka Kotatsu in singles competition. In the fifth bout, Bozilla and Akira Kurogane defeated Zones and Soi in singles competition.

In the main event, Ranna Yagami defeated Tae Honma in singles competition. This was Honma's last Stardom appearance before her retirement later that year.

== Results ==
No.	Results	Stipulations	Times
1	Ema Maishima vs. Kikyo Furusawa ended in a time-limit draw	Singles match	10:00
2	Yuki Mashiro defeated Yuria Hime and Fukigen Death by pinfall	Three-way match	6:40
3	Empress Nexus Venus (Waka Tsukiyama and Rian) defeated Riara and Echika Miyabi by pinfall	Tag team match	11:25
4	Hina defeated Kiyoka Kotatsu by pinfall	Singles match	7:18
5	Mi Vida Loca (Bozilla and Akira Kurogane) defeated Zones and Soi by pinfall	Tag team match	13:31
6	Ranna Yagami defeated Tae Honma by pinfall	Singles match	12:40
