= Stardom 5 Star Grand Prix 2026 =

2026 edition of the Stardom 5 Star Grand Prix

- Promotional poster of the tournament
- Promotion: World Wonder Ring Stardom
- Date: July 18 – August 23, 2026
- City: See venues
- Venue: See venues

Event chronology
← Previous; The Conversion	Next → —

Stardom 5Star Grand Prix Tournament chronology
← Previous; 2025	Next → —

Stardom 5 Star Grand Prix 2026
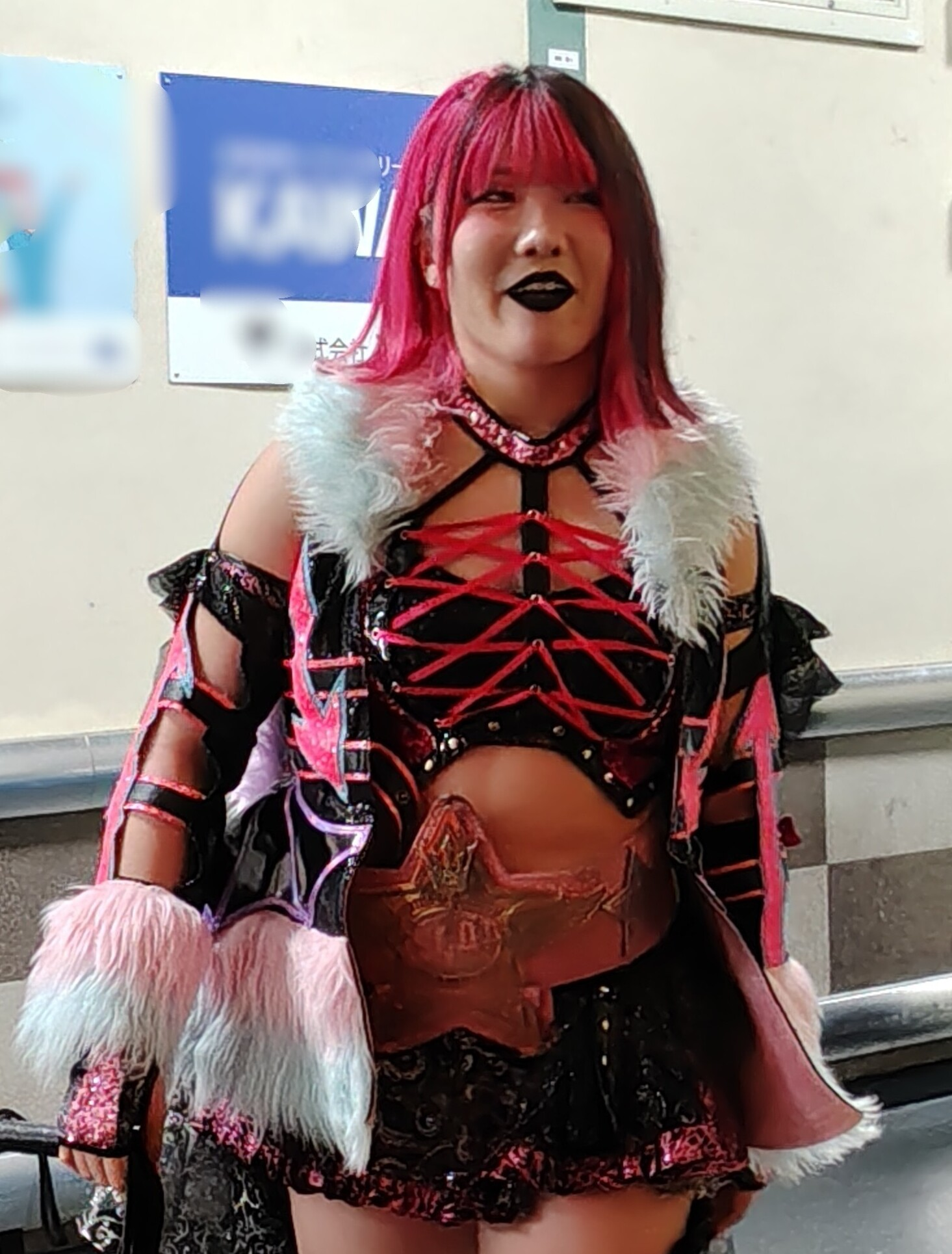

Tournament information
- Sport: Professional wrestling
- Location: Japan
- Dates: July 18, 2026–August 23, 2026
- Tournament format: Four-block round-robin tournament
- Participants: 32

Final positions
- Champion: Rina
- Runner-up: Starlight Kid

Tournament statistics
- Bouts fought: 124

Stardom 5 Star Grand Prix 2026 (スターダム5スターグランプリ2026, Sutādamu 5 sutāguranpuri 2026), often stylized as 5★Star GP 2026 was the fifteenth annual professional wrestling tournament under the Stardom 5Star Grand Prix Tournament branch promoted by the Japanese promotion World Wonder Ring Stardom. It took place between July 18 and August 23, 2026.

== Tournament history ==
The Stardom 5 Star Grand Prix is a professional wrestling tournament held each summer by Stardom. Similar to New Japan Pro-Wrestling's G1 Climax tournament, it is currently held as a round-robin tournament with wrestlers split into four blocks. As is the case with G1 Climax, a win is two points and a draw is one point for each wrestler. The top 3 wrestlers in each block advance and enter into a single-elimination playoff bracket, with the block winners earning a bye into the quarterfinals.

=== Storylines ===
The event features professional wrestling matches that resulted from scripted storylines, where wrestlers portrayed villains, heroes, or less distinguishable characters in the scripted events that built tension and culminated in a wrestling match or series of matches.

== Qualifiers ==
=== Qualifying matches ===
No.	Results	Stipulations	Times
1	Kikyo Furusawa defeated Ema Maishima	5 Star Grand Prix Blue Block Qualifying match	10:54
2	Akira Kurogane defeated Kiyoka Kotatsu	5 Star Grand Prix Red Block Qualifying match	6:59

== Participants ==
*Noted underneath are the champions who held their titles at the time of the tournament. The titleholders or even the number of contestants can change over time.

Wrestler	Unit	Notes
Akira Kurogane	Mi Vida Loca	
Ami Sohrei	God's Eye	Artist of Stardom Champion
Aya Sakura	Cosmic Angels	New Blood Tag Team Champion
AZM	Neo Genesis	Goddesses of Stardom Champion
Azusa Inaba	H.A.T.E.	
Julia Hart	Triangle of Madness	From All Elite Wrestling. Replacement for Bea Priestley (injured).
Hanan	Stars	Wonder of Stardom Champion
Hanako	Unaffiliated	
Hina	God's Eye	Artist of Stardom Champion
Itsuki Aoki	Mi Vida Loca	
Kikyo Furusawa	Unaffiliated	
Koguma	Unaffiliated	
Konami	H.A.T.E.	
Lady C	Artist of Stardom Champion	
Maika	Unaffiliated	
Maki Itoh	Unaffiliated	
Mei Seira	Neo Genesis	
Momo Watanabe	H.A.T.E.	
Miyu Amasaki	Neo Genesis	Goddesses of Stardom Champion
Natsuko Tora	H.A.T.E.	
Rian	Unaffiliated	
Rina	H.A.T.E.	
Rina Yamashita	Mi Vida Loca	
Ruaka	H.A.T.E.	
Saya Iida	Stars	
Saya Kamitani	H.A.T.E.	
Sayaka Kurara	Cosmic Angels	New Blood Tag Team Champion
Starlight Kid	Neo Genesis	
Suzu Suzuki	Mi Vida Loca	World of Stardom Champion
Tomoka Inaba	God's Eye	
Utami Hayashishita	Unaffiliated	
Yuna Mizumori	Cosmic Angels	High Speed Champion

== Blocks ==
=== Overview ===
Current standings
Blue Stars A		Blue Stars B		Red Stars A		Red Stars B	
Suzu Suzuki	13	Ami Sohrei	10	Maika	11	Konami	10
Hanako	9	Starlight Kid	9	Rina	9	Saya Iida	9
Ruaka	8	Hanan	9	AZM	9	Rina Yamashita	9
Julia Hart	8	Momo Watanabe	8	Itsuki Aoki	8	Maki Itoh	8
Hina	6	Saya Kamitani	8	Natsuko Tora	8	Utami Hayashishita	7
Miyu Amasaki	6	Koguma	6	Tomoka Inaba	6	Mei Seira	7
Aya Sakura	4	Yuna Mizumori	6	Sayaka Kurara	4	Azusa Inaba	4
Rian	2	Kikyo Furusawa	0	Akira Kurogane	1	Lady C	2

Blue Stars A	Sakura	Hanako	Rian	Hina	Amasaki	Ruaka	Hart	Suzuki
Sakura	—N/a	Sakura (13:36)	Rian (12:55)	Hina (11:27)	Amasaki (8:58)	Sakura (9:59)	Hart (8:02)	Suzuki (11:55)
Hanako	Sakura (13:36)	—N/a	Hanako (9:07)	Hanako (14:08)	Hanako (14:22)	Draw (15:00)	Hanako (8:30)	Suzuki (11:06)
Rian	Rian (12:55)	Hanako (9:07)	—N/a	Hina (9:49)	Amasaki (8:21)	Ruaka (5:34)	Hart (5:31)	Suzuki (4:21)
Hina	Hina (11:27)	Hanako (14:08)	Hina (9:49)	—N/a	Amasaki (12:23)	Hina (11:31)	Hart (8:04)	Suzuki (10:35)
Amasaki	Amasaki (8:58)	Hanako (14:22)	Amasaki (8:21)	Amasaki (12:23)	—N/a	Ruaka (4:06)	Hart (7:05)	Suzuki (7:05)
Ruaka	Sakura (9:59)	Draw (15:00)	Ruaka (5:34)	Hina (11:31)	Ruaka (4:06)	—N/a	Ruaka (7:35)	Draw (8:05)
Hart	Hart (8:02)	Hanako (8:30)	Hart (5:31)	Hart (8:04)	Hart (7:05)	Ruaka (7:35)	—N/a	Suzuki (5:06)
Suzuki	Suzuki (11:55)	Suzuki (11:06)	Suzuki (4:21)	Suzuki (10:35)	Suzuki (7:05)	Draw (8:05)	Suzuki (5:06)	—N/a

Blue Stars B	Kid	Hanan	Mizumori	Koguma	Sohrei	Kamitani	Watanabe	Furusawa
Kid	—N/a	Hanan (11:28)	Kid (10:55)	Kid (9:49)	Sohrei (11:36)	Draw (15:00)	Kid (10:11)	Kid (7:53)
Hanan	Hanan (11:28)	—N/a	Mizumori (5:55)	Hanan (8:34)	Sohrei (11:16)	Hanan (9:56)	Draw (15:00)	Hanan (7:34)
Mizumori	Kid (10:55)	Mizumori (5:55)	—N/a	Mizumori (7:50)	Sohrei (7:29)	Kamitani (9:29)	Watanabe (9:41)	Mizumori (7:59)
Koguma	Kid (9:49)	Hanan (8:34)	Mizumori (7:50)	—N/a	Koguma (7:08)	Kamitani (7:24)	Koguma (12:51)	Koguma (7:34)
Sohrei	Sohrei (11:36)	Sohrei (11:16)	Sohrei (7:29)	Koguma (7:08)	—N/a	Sohrei (14:02)	Watanabe (13:34)	Sohrei (7:56)
Kamitani	Draw (15:00)	Hanan (9:56)	Kamitani (9:29)	Kamitani (7:24)	Sohrei (14:02)	—N/a	Draw (15:00)	Kamitani (7:15)
Watanabe	Kid (10:11)	Draw (15:00)	Watanabe (9:41)	Koguma (12:51)	Watanabe (13:34)	Draw (15:00)	—N/a	Watanabe (7:44)
Furusawa	Kid (7:53)	Hanan (7:34)	Mizumori (7:59)	Koguma (7:34)	Sohrei (7:56)	Kamitani (7:15)	Watanabe (7:44)	—N/a

Red Stars A	Maika	Kurara	Rina	Inaba	Aoki	AZM	Tora	Kurogane
Maika	—N/a	Maika (6:01)	Draw (15:00)	Maika (8:03)	Maika (11:40)	Maika (13:03)	Tora (11:08)	Maika (7:00)
Kurara	Maika (6:01)	—N/a	Kurara (13:54)	Inaba (4:49)	Aoki (10:04)	AZM (3:02)	Tora (7:28)	Kurara (6:00)
Rina	Draw (15:00)	Kurara (13:54)	—N/a	Rina (5:10)	Rina (14:36)	Rina (14:07)	Tora (10:54)	Rina (9:21)
Inaba	Maika (8:03)	Inaba (4:49)	Rina (5:10)	—N/a	Aoki (9:52)	AZM (9:05)	Inaba (8:48)	Inaba (6:57)
Aoki	Maika (11:40)	Aoki (10:04)	Rina (14:36)	Aoki (9:52)	—N/a	AZM (13:38)	Aoki (6:42)	Aoki (11:02)
AZM	Maika (13:03)	AZM (3:02)	Rina (14:07)	AZM (9:05)	AZM (13:38)	—N/a	Draw (9:42)	AZM (7:39)
Tora	Tora (11:08)	Tora (7:28)	Tora (10:54)	Inaba (8:48)	Aoki (6:42)	Draw (9:42)	—N/a	Draw (8:41)
Kurogane	Maika (7:00)	Kurara (6:00)	Rina (9:21)	Inaba (6:57)	Aoki (11:02)	AZM (7:39)	Draw (8:41)	—N/a

Red Stars B	Konami	Iida	Lady C	Inaba	Seira	Yamashita	Itoh	Hayashishita
Konami	—N/a	Iida (13:03)	Konami (8:29)	Konami (8:40)	Konami (11:22)	Yamashita (10:26)	Konami (13:24)	Konami (12:41)
Iida	Iida (13:03)	—N/a	Iida (11:30)	Iida (7:56)	Seira (10:27)	Draw (15:00)	Iida (12:57)	Hayashishita (13:45)
Lady C	Konami (8:29)	Iida (11:30)	—N/a	Lady C (8:38)	Seira (4:29)	Yamashita (7:03)	Itoh (8:03)	Hayashishita (11:08)
Inaba	Konami (8:40)	Iida (7:56)	Lady C (8:38)	—N/a	Draw (15:00)	Yamashita (8:56)	Draw (15:00)	Inaba (9:13)
Seira	Konami (11:22)	Seira (10:27)	Seira (4:29)	Draw (15:00)	—N/a	Seira (8:41)	Itoh (10:23)	Hayashishita (11:15)
Yamashita	Yamashita (10:26)	Draw (15:00)	Yamashita (7:03)	Yamashita (8:56)	Seira (8:41)	—N/a	Draw (12:44)	Draw (15:00)
Itoh	Konami (13:24)	Iida (12:57)	Itoh (8:03)	Draw (15:00)	Itoh (10:23)	Draw (12:44)	—N/a	Itoh (13:05)
Hayashishita	Konami (12:41)	Hayashishita (13:45)	Hayashishita (11:08)	Inaba (9:13)	Hayashishita (11:15)	Draw (15:00)	Itoh (13:05)	—N/a

Playoffs (August 18, 2026)
Blue B2	Hanan	11:27
Blue A3	Ruaka	pin
Blue A2	Hanako	13:58
Blue B3	Starlight Kid	sub
Red B2	Saya Iida	pin
Red A3	AZM	10:22
Red A2	Rina	pin
Red B3	Rina Yamashita	11:22

Quarterfinals (August 18, 2026)
Blue A1	Suzu Suzuki	pin
Blue A3	Ruaka	10:13
Blue B1	Ami Sohrei	12:16
Blue B3	Starlight Kid	pin
Red A1	Maika	pin
Red B2	Saya Iida	12:49
Red B1	Konami	17:17
Red A2	Rina	pin

Semifinals (August 23, 2026)
Blue A1	Suzu Suzuki	16:56
Blue B3	Starlight Kid	sub
Red A1	Maika	16:51
Red A2	Rina	sub

Final (August 23, 2026)
Blue B3	Starlight Kid	27:03
Red A2	Rina	pin

== Results ==
=== Night 1 ===
The first night took place on July 18, 2026, at the Ota City General Gymnasium in Ota, Tokyo.

No.	Results	Stipulations	Times
1^{P}	AZM defeated Fuwa-chan by pinfall	Singles match	6:11
2^{P}	H.A.T.E. (Saya Kamitani, Natsuko Tora, Konami and Rina) defeated Suzu Suzuki, Hanan, Saori Anou and Maika by pinfall	Eight-woman tag team match	7:28
3	Sayaka Kurara defeated Akira Kurogane by pinfall	Red Stars A Block singles match in the 5 Star Grand Prix tournament	6:00
4	Momo Watanabe defeated Yuna Mizumori by pinfall	Blue Stars B Block singles match in the 5 Star Grand Prix tournament	9:41
5	Koguma defeated Kikyo Furusawa by pinfall	Blue Stars B Block singles match in the 5 Star Grand Prix tournament	7:34
6	Itsuki Aoki defeated Tomoka Inaba by pinfall	Red Stars A Block singles match in the 5 Star Grand Prix tournament	9:52
7	Mei Seira defeated Rina Yamashita by pinfall	Red Stars B Block singles match in the 5 Star Grand Prix tournament	8:41
8	Saya Iida defeated Azusa Inaba by pinfall	Blue Stars A Block singles match in the 5 Star Grand Prix tournament	7:56
9	Ruaka defeated Miyu Amasaki by pinfall	Blue Stars A Block singles match in the 5 Star Grand Prix tournament	4:06
10	Aya Sakura defeated Hanako by pinfall	Blue Stars A Block singles match in the 5 Star Grand Prix tournament	13:36
11	Triangle Of Madness (Thekla, Julia Hart and Skye Blue) defeated Dream Trine (Hina, Ami Sohrei, and Lady C) (c) by pinfall	Six-woman tag team match for the Artist of Stardom Championship	13:55
12	Syuri (c) defeated Natsupoi by pinfall	Singles match for the IWGP Women's Championship	20:52
(c) / – the champion(s) heading into the match; P / – the match was broadcast on the pre-show

=== Night 2 ===
The second night took place on July 19, 2026, at the Loisir Hotel Toyohashi Holiday Hall in Toyohashi, Aichi.

No.	Results	Stipulations	Times
1	SaoriPoi (Natsupoi and Saori Anou) defeated Ema Maishima and Matoi Hamabe by pinfall	tag team match	8:32
2	Hanan defeated Kikyo Furusawa by pinfall	Blue Stars B Block singles match in the 5 Star Grand Prix tournament	7:34
3	Koguma defeated Ami Sohrei by pinfall	Blue Stars B Block singles match in the 5 Star Grand Prix tournament	7:08
4	Ruaka defeated Rian by pinfall	Blue Stars A Block singles match in the 5 Star Grand Prix tournament	5:34
5	Maki Itoh defeated Mei Seira by submission	Red Stars B Block singles match in the 5 Star Grand Prix tournament	10:23
6	Tomoka Inaba defeated Natsuko Tora by disqualification	Red Stars A Block singles match in the 5 Star Grand Prix tournament	8:48
7	Suzu Suzuki defeated Hina by pinfall	Blue Stars A Block singles match in the 5 Star Grand Prix tournament	10:35
8	Utami Hayashishita vs. Rina Yamashita ended in a time-limit draw	Red Stars B Block singles match in the 5 Star Grand Prix tournament	15:00
9	Sayaka Kurara defeated Rina by pinfall	Red Stars A Block singles match in the 5 Star Grand Prix tournament	13:54

=== Night 3 ===
The third night took place on July 20, 2026, at the Herbis Hall in Osaka, Japan.

No.	Results	Stipulations	Times
1	Saori Anou defeated Natsupoi, Ema Maishima, and Matoi Hamabe by pinfall	fatal four-way match	5:20
2	Momo Watanabe defeated Kikyo Furusawa by submission	Blue Stars B Block singles match in the 5 Star Grand Prix tournament	7:44
3	Rina Yamashita defeated Azusa Inaba by pinfall	Red Stars B Block singles match in the 5 Star Grand Prix tournament	8:56
4	Hina defeated Aya Sakura by pinfall	Blue Stars A Block singles match in the 5 Star Grand Prix tournament	11:27
5	Saya Iida defeated Lady C by submission	Red Stars B Block singles match in the 5 Star Grand Prix tournament	11:30
6	Hanan defeated Koguma by pinfall	Blue Stars B Block singles match in the 5 Star Grand Prix tournament	8:34
7	Tomoka Inaba defeated Sayaka Kurara by pinfall	Red Stars A Block singles match in the 5 Star Grand Prix tournament	4:49
8	Hanako defeated Miyu Amasaki by pinfall	Blue Stars A Block singles match in the 5 Star Grand Prix tournament	14:22
9	Maika defeated AZM by pinfall	Red Stars A Block singles match in the 5 Star Grand Prix tournament	13:03

=== Night 4 ===
The forth night took place on July 25, 2026, at the Ishikawa Industrial Exhibition Hall #2 in Kanazawa, Japan.

No.	Results	Stipulations	Times
1	Rina defeated Akira Kurogane by submission	Red Stars A Block singles match in the 5 Star Grand Prix tournament	9:21
2	Itsuki Aoki defeated Natsuko Tora by pinfall	Red Stars A Block singles match in the 5 Star Grand Prix tournament	6:42
3	Rina Yamashita defeated Lady C by pinfall	Red Stars B Block singles match in the 5 Star Grand Prix tournament	7:03
4	Maika defeated Sayaka Kurara by submission	Red Stars A Block singles match in the 5 Star Grand Prix tournament	6:01
5	Stars (Hanan and Matoi Hamabe) defeated Ema Maishima and Anne Kanaya by pinfall	Tag team match	8:38
6	Azusa Inaba defeated Utami Hayashishita by pinfall	Red Stars B Block singles match in the 5 Star Grand Prix tournament	9:13
7	AZM defeated Tomoka Inaba by pinfall	Red Stars A Block singles match in the 5 Star Grand Prix tournament	9:05
8	Konami defeated Mei Seira by submission	Red Stars B Block singles match in the 5 Star Grand Prix tournament	14:22
9	Saya Iida defeated Maki Itoh by pinfall	Red Stars A Block singles match in the 5 Star Grand Prix tournament	12:57

=== Night 5 ===
The fifth night took place on July 26, 2026, at the Duo Cerezo in Niigata, Japan.

No.	Results	Stipulations	Times
1	Maika defeated Tomoka Inaba by pinfall	Red Stars A Block singles match in the 5 Star Grand Prix tournament	8:03
2	Konami defeated Lady C by pinfall	Red Stars B Block singles match in the 5 Star Grand Prix tournament	8:29
3	Natsuko Tora defeated Rina by pinfall	Red Stars A Block singles match in the 5 Star Grand Prix tournament	10:54
4	AZM defeated Sayaka Kurara by pinfall	Red Stars A Block singles match in the 5 Star Grand Prix tournament	3:02
5	Mei Seira vs. Azusa Inaba ended in a time-limit draw	Red Stars B Block singles match in the 5 Star Grand Prix tournament	15:00
6	Itsuki Aoki defeated Akira Kurogane by pinfall	Red Stars A Block singles match in the 5 Star Grand Prix tournament	11:02
7	Rina Yamashita vs. Maki Itoh ended in a double countout	Red Stars B Block singles match in the 5 Star Grand Prix tournament	12:44
8	Utami Hayashishita defeated Saya Iida by pinfall	Red Stars B Block singles match in the 5 Star Grand Prix tournament	13:45

=== Night 6 ===
The sixth night took place on July 28, 2026, at Korakuen Hall in Tokyo, Japan.

No.	Results	Stipulations	Times
1	Cosmic Angels (Natsupoi, Saori Anou, and Anne Kanaya) defeated Kiyoka Kotatsu, Matoi Hamabe, and Ema Maishima	Six-man tag team match	7:40
2	Julia Hart defeated Rian by submission	Blue Stars A Block singles match in the 5 Star Grand Prix tournament	5:31
3	Itsuki Aoki defeated Sayaka Kurara by pinfall	Red Stars A Block singles match in the 5 Star Grand Prix tournament	10:04
4	Ami Sohrei defeated Yuna Mizumori by pinfall	Blue Stars B Block singles match in the 5 Star Grand Prix tournament	7:29
5	Maki Itoh defeated Lady C by pinfall	Red Stars B Block singles match in the 5 Star Grand Prix tournament	8:03
6	Natsuko Tora defeated Maika by pinfall	Red Stars A Block singles match in the 5 Star Grand Prix tournament	11:18
7	Suzu Suzuki defeated Miyu Amasaki by pinfall	Blue Stars A Block singles match in the 5 Star Grand Prix tournament	7:05
8	Konami defeated Utami Hayashishita by referee stoppage	Red Stars B Block singles match in the 5 Star Grand Prix tournament	12:41
9	Saya Kamitani vs. Starlight Kid ended in a time-limit draw	Blue Stars B Block singles match in the 5 Star Grand Prix tournament	15:00

=== Night 7 ===
The seventh night took place on August 1, 2026, at Sendai Pit in Miyagi, Japan.

No.	Results	Stipulations	Times
1	Yuna Mizumori defeated Kikyo Furusawa by pinfall	Blue Stars B Block singles match in the 5 Star Grand Prix tournament	7:59
2	Miyu Amasaki defeated Rian by pinfall	Blue Stars A Block singles match in the 5 Star Grand Prix tournament	8:21
3	Julia Hart defeated Hina by submission	Blue Stars A Block singles match in the 5 Star Grand Prix tournament	8:04
4	Saya Kamitani defeated Koguma by pinfall	Blue Stars B Block singles match in the 5 Star Grand Prix tournament	7:24
5	Aya Sakura defeated Ruaka by pinfall	Blue Stars A Block singles match in the 5 Star Grand Prix tournament	9:59
6	Suzu Suzuki defeated Hanako by pinfall	Blue Stars A Block singles match in the 5 Star Grand Prix tournament	11:06
7	Momo Watanabe defeated Ami Sohrei by pinfall	Blue Stars B Block singles match in the 5 Star Grand Prix tournament	13:34
8	Hanan defeated Starlight Kid by pinfall	Blue Stars B Block singles match in the 5 Star Grand Prix tournament	11:28

=== Night 8 ===
The eighth night took place on August 2, 2026, at Light Cube Utsunomiya in Tochigi, Japan.

No.	Results	Stipulations	Times
1	Saya Kamitani defeated Kikyo Furusawa by pinfall	Blue Stars B Block singles match in the 5 Star Grand Prix tournament	7:15
2	Suzu Suzuki defeated Rian by pinfall	Blue Stars A Block singles match in the 5 Star Grand Prix tournament	4:21
3	Miyu Amasaki defeated Aya Sakura by pinfall	Blue Stars A Block singles match in the 5 Star Grand Prix tournament	8:58
4	Ruaka defeated Julia Hart by pinfall	Blue Stars A Block singles match in the 5 Star Grand Prix tournament	7:35
5	Yuna Mizumori defeated Koguma by pinfall	Blue Stars B Block singles match in the 5 Star Grand Prix tournament	7:50
6	Starlight Kid defeated Momo Watanabe by pinfall	Blue Stars B Block singles match in the 5 Star Grand Prix tournament	10:11
7	Ami Sohrei defeated Hanan by pinfall	Blue Stars B Block singles match in the 5 Star Grand Prix tournament	11:16
8	Hanako defeated Hina by pinfall	Blue Stars A Block singles match in the 5 Star Grand Prix tournament	14:08
9	Rina defeated Itsuki Aoki by pinfall	Red Stars A Block singles match in the 5 Star Grand Prix tournament	14:36

=== Night 9 ===
The ninth night took place on August 3, 2026, at Korakuen Hall in Tokyo, Japan.

No.	Results	Stipulations	Times
1	Natsupoi defeated Anne Kanaya by pinfall	Singles match	10:53
2	Saori Anou and Matoi Hamabe defeated Waka Tsukiyama and Ema Maishima by pinfall	Tag team match	6:46
3	Hina defeated Rian by pinfall	Blue Stars A Block singles match in the 5 Star Grand Prix tournament	9:49
4	Lady C defeated Azusa Inaba by pinfall	Red Stars B Block singles match in the 5 Star Grand Prix tournament	8:38
5	Natsuko Tora vs. Akira Kurogane ended in a double countout	Red Stars A Block singles match in the 5 Star Grand Prix tournament	8:41
6	Julia Hart defeated Aya Sakura by submission	Blue Stars A Block singles match in the 5 Star Grand Prix tournament	8:02
7	Starlight Kid defeated Yuna Mizumori by pinfall	Blue Stars B Block singles match in the 5 Star Grand Prix tournament	10:55
8	AZM defeated Itsuki Aoki by pinfall	Red Stars A Block singles match in the 5 Star Grand Prix tournament	13:38
9	Saya Iida defeated Konami by pinfall	Red Stars B Block singles match in the 5 Star Grand Prix tournament	13:03
10	Saya Kamitani vs. Momo Watanabe ended in a time-limit draw	Blue Stars B Block singles match in the 5 Star Grand Prix tournament	15:00

=== Night 10 ===
The tenth night took place on August 8, 2026, at Chateraise Gateaux Kingdom Sapporo in Sapporo, Japan.

No.	Results	Stipulations	Times
1	Waka Tsukiyama and Ema Maishima defeated Stars (Saya Iida and Matoi Hamabe) by pinfall	Tag team match	7:17
2	Tomoka Inaba defeated Akira Kurogane by pinfall	Red Stars A Block singles match in the 5 Star Grand Prix tournament	6:57
3	AZM vs. Natsuko Tora ended in a double disqualification	Red Stars A Block singles match in the 5 Star Grand Prix tournament	9:42
4	SaoriPoi (Natsupoi and Saori Anou) defeated Cosmic Angels (Sayaka Kurara and Anne Kanaya) by pinfall	Tag team match	8:16
5	Maki Itoh vs. Azusa Inaba ended in a time-limit draw	Red Stars B Block singles match in the 5 Star Grand Prix tournament	15:00
6	Rina Yamashita defeated Konami by pinfall	Red Stars B Block singles match in the 5 Star Grand Prix tournament	10:26
7	Maika vs. Rina ended in a time-limit draw	Red Stars A Block singles match in the 5 Star Grand Prix tournament	15:00
8	Utami Hayashishita defeated Lady C by pinfall	Red Stars A Block singles match in the 5 Star Grand Prix tournament	11:08

=== Night 11 ===
The eleventh night took place on August 9, 2026, at Chateraise Gateaux Kingdom Sapporo in Sapporo, Japan.

No.	Results	Stipulations	Times
1	Natsuko Tora defeated Sayaka Kurara by pinfall	Red Stars A Block singles match in the 5 Star Grand Prix tournament	7:28
2	AZM defeated Akira Kurogane by pinfall	Red Stars A Block singles match in the 5 Star Grand Prix tournament	7:39
3	SaoriPoi (Natsupoi and Saori Anou) defeated Waka Tsukiyama and Lady C by pinfall	Tag team match	10:45
4	Konami defeated Azusa Inaba by submission	Red Stars B Block singles match in the 5 Star Grand Prix tournament	8:40
5	Maika defeated Itsuki Aoki by pinfall	Red Stars A Block singles match in the 5 Star Grand Prix tournament	11:40
6	Saya Iida vs. Rina Yamashita ended in a time-limit draw	Red Stars B Block singles match in the 5 Star Grand Prix tournament	15:00
7	Rina defeated Tomoka Inaba by pinfall	Red Stars A Block singles match in the 5 Star Grand Prix tournament	5:10
8	Maki Itoh defeated Utami Hayashishita by pinfall	Red Stars B Block singles match in the 5 Star Grand Prix tournament	13:05

=== Night 12 ===
The twelfth night took place on August 14, 2026, at Kobe Sambo Hall in Kobe, Japan.

No.	Results	Stipulations	Times
1	Saya Kamitani defeated Yuna Mizumori by pinfall	Blue Stars B Block singles match in the 5 Star Grand Prix tournament	9:29
2	Hanako defeated Rian by pinfall	Blue Stars A Block singles match in the 5 Star Grand Prix tournament	9:07
3	Ami Sohrei defeated Kikyo Furusawa by pinfall	Blue Stars B Block singles match in the 5 Star Grand Prix tournament	7:56
4	Mei Seira defeated Lady C by pinfall	Red Stars B Block singles match in the 5 Star Grand Prix tournament	4:29
5	Starlight Kid defeated Koguma by pinfall	Blue Stars B Block singles match in the 5 Star Grand Prix tournament	9:49
6	Julia Hart defeated Miyu Amasaki by submission	Blue Stars A Block singles match in the 5 Star Grand Prix tournament	7:05
7	Hina defeated Ruaka by pinfall	Blue Stars A Block singles match in the 5 Star Grand Prix tournament	11:31
8	Hanan vs. Momo Watanabe ended in a time-limit draw	Blue Stars B Block singles match in the 5 Star Grand Prix tournament	15:00
9	Suzu Suzuki defeated Aya Sakura by pinfall	Blue Stars A Block singles match in the 5 Star Grand Prix tournament	11:55

=== Night 13 ===
The thirteenth night took place on August 15, 2026, at KBS Hall in Kyoto, Japan.

No.	Results	Stipulations	Times
1	Rian defeated Aya Sakura by pinfall	Blue Stars A Block singles match in the 5 Star Grand Prix tournament	12:55
2	Starlight Kid defeated Kikyo Furusawa by submission	Blue Stars B Block singles match in the 5 Star Grand Prix tournament	7:53
3	Yuna Mizumori defeated Hanan by pinfall	Blue Stars B Block singles match in the 5 Star Grand Prix tournament	5:55
4	Suzu Suzuki vs. Ruaka ended in a double countout	Blue Stars A Block singles match in the 5 Star Grand Prix tournament	8:05
5	Mei Seira defeated Saya Iida by pinfall	Red Stars B Block singles match in the 5 Star Grand Prix tournament	10:27
6	Koguma defeated Momo Watanabe by pinfall	Blue Stars B Block singles match in the 5 Star Grand Prix tournament	12:51
7	Hanako defeated Julia Hart by pinfall	Blue Stars A Block singles match in the 5 Star Grand Prix tournament	8:30
8	Miyu Amasaki defeated Hina by pinfall	Blue Stars A Block singles match in the 5 Star Grand Prix tournament	12:23
9	Ami Sohrei defeated Saya Kamitani by pinfall	Blue Stars B Block singles match in the 5 Star Grand Prix tournament	14:02

=== Night 14 ===
The fourteenth night took place on August 16, 2026, at Act City Hamamatsu Exhibition Event Hall in Hamamatsu, Japan.

No.	Results	Stipulations	Times
1	Hanan defeated Saya Kamitani by pinfall	Blue Stars B Block singles match in the 5 Star Grand Prix tournament	9:56
2	Maika defeated Akira Kurogane by pinfall	Red Stars A Block singles match in the 5 Star Grand Prix tournament	7:00
3	Suzu Suzuki defeated Julia Hart by pinfall	Blue Stars A Block singles match in the 5 Star Grand Prix tournament	5:06
4	Hanako vs. Ruaka ended in time-limit draw	Blue Stars A Block singles match in the 5 Star Grand Prix tournament	15:00
5	Utami Hayashishita defeated Mei Seira by pinfall	Red Stars B Block singles match in the 5 Star Grand Prix tournament	11:15
6	Ami Sohrei defeated Starlight Kid by pinfall	Blue Stars B Block singles match in the 5 Star Grand Prix tournament	11:36
7	Konami defeated Maki Itoh by submission	Red Stars B Block singles match in the 5 Star Grand Prix tournament	13:24
8	Rina defeated AZM by pinfall	Red Stars A Block singles match in the 5 Star Grand Prix tournament	14:07

=== Night 15 ===
The fifteenth night took place on August 18, 2026, at Korakuen Hall in Tokyo, Japan.

No.	Results	Stipulations	Times
1	Starlight Kid defeated Hanako by submission	Blue Stars playoff singles match in the 5 Star Grand Prix tournament	13:58
2	Saya Iida defeated AZM by pinfall	Red Stars playoff singles match in the 5 Star Grand Prix tournament	10:22
3	Ruaka defeated Hanan by pinfall	Blue Stars playoff singles match in the 5 Star Grand Prix tournament	11:27
4	Rina defeated Rina Yamashita by pinfall	Red Stars playoff singles match in the 5 Star Grand Prix tournament	11:22
5	Starlight Kid defeated Ami Sohrei by pinfall	Blue Stars Quarterfinals singles match in the 5 Star Grand Prix tournament	12:16
6	Maika defeated Saya Iida by pinfall	Red Stars Quarterfinals singles match in the 5 Star Grand Prix tournament	12:49
7	Suzu Suzuki defeated Ruaka by pinfall	Blue Stars Quarterfinals singles match in the 5 Star Grand Prix tournament	10:13
8	Rina defeated Konami by pinfall	Red Stars Quarterfinals singles match in the 5 Star Grand Prix tournament	17:17

=== Night 16 ===
The sixteen night took place on August 23, 2026, at Ryogoku Kokugikan in Tokyo, Japan.

No.	Results	Stipulations	Times
1	Starlight Kid defeated Suzu Suzuki by submission	Blue Stars Semi-final singles match in the 5 Star Grand Prix tournament	16:56
2	Rina defeated Maika by submission	Red Stars Semi-final singles match in the 5 Star Grand Prix tournament	16:51
3	Koguma and Matoi Hamabe defeated Cosmic Angels (Yuna Mizumori and Anne Kanaya) and H.A.T.E. (Konami and Fukigen Death) and Neo Genesis (Mei Seira and Ema Maishima) by pinfall	Four-way tag team match	4:40
4	God's Eye (Ami Sohrei, Tomoka Inaba, Hina, Lady C and Kiyoka Kotatsu) defeated Maki Itoh, 02line (AZM and Miyu Amasaki) and Hanako and Waka Tsukiyama	Ten-woman tag team match	8:31
5	H.A.T.E. (Natsuko Tora, Ruaka and Azusa Inaba defeated Mi Vida Loca (Rina Yamashita, Itsuki Aoki and Akira Kurogane) by pinfall	Six-woman tag team match	10:10
6	Ranna Yagami and Kikyo Furusawa defeated Sakurara (Aya Sakura and Sayaka Kurara by pinfall	Tag team match	15:11
7	H.A.T.E. (Momo Watanabe and Saya Kamitani) defeated wing★gori (Hanan and Saya Iida by pinfall	Tag team match	12:44
8	Natsupoi defeated Saori Anou by pinfall	singles match	25:32
9	Rina defeated Starlight Kid by pinfall	5 Star Grand Prix tournament finals	27:03

== See also ==
- G1 Climax
- N-1 Victory
