= Stardom The Conversion 2025 =

2025 World Wonder Ring Stardom event

Stardom The Conversion
- Promotional poster of the event
- Promotion: World Wonder Ring Stardom
- Date: June 21, 2025
- City: Tokyo, Japan
- Venue: Yoyogi National Gymnasium
- Attendance: 2,521

Event chronology
← Previous; New Blood 22	Next → New Blood 23

The Conversion chronology
← Previous; 2024	Next → 2026

Stardom The Conversion 2025 (スターダム・ザ・コンバージョン 2025, Sutādamu za konbājon 2025) was a professional wrestling event promoted by World Wonder Ring Stardom. The event took place on June 21, 2025, in Tokyo at Yoyogi National Gymnasium.

Nine matches were contested at the event, including three on the pre-show, and three of Stardom's nine championships were on the line. The main event saw Sareee defeat Syuri to win the IWGP Women's Championship.

== Production ==
=== Background ===
The show featured professional wrestling matches that result from scripted storylines, where wrestlers portray villains, heroes, or less distinguishable characters in the scripted events that build tension and culminate in a wrestling match or series of matches.

=== Event ===
The event started with three preshow bouts broadcast live on Stardom's YouTube channel. In the first one, Waka Tsukiyama defeated Yuria Hime in singles competition, in the second one Hina defeated Rian to secure the third consecutive defense of the Future of Stardom Championship in that respective reign, and in the third one, Yuna Mizumori, Aya Sakura and Sayaka Kurara picked up a victory over Momo Kohgo, Ema Maishima and Kikyo Furusawa in six-woman tag team competition.

In the first main card bout, Natsuko Tora and Ruaka outmatched Hazuki and Koguma in tag team competition. Next up, Risa Sera defeated Hanako in singles competition. The sixth bout of the event saw Saya Kamitani, Momo Watanabe, Konami and Rina defeat Ami Sohrei, Kiyoka Kotatsu, Lady C and Ranna Yagami in eight-woman tag team competition in which Sohrei made her in-ring return after an 11-month injury. In the seventh bout, Hanan and Saya Iida defeated Natsupoi and Saori Anou to secure the fourth consecutive defense of the Goddesses of Stardom Championship in that respective reign. After the bout concluded, Yuna Mizumori issued a challenge to the tag team titles.

In the semi main event, Suzu Suzuki, Rina Yamashita, Itsuki Aoki and Akira Kurogane defeated Starlight Kid, AZM, Mei Seira and Miyu Amasaki in a No Disqualification match. Bozilla appeared and helped "Mi Vida Loca" members win the bout and was presented as the unit's newest member. She also issued a challenge to AZM's Strong Women's Championship.

In the main event, Sareee defeated Syuri to win the IWGP Women's Championship, ending the latters' reign at 55 days and one defense.

== Results ==
No.	Results	Stipulations	Times
1^{P}	Waka Tsukiyama defeated Yuria Hime by pinfall	Singles match	9:17
2^{P}	Hina (c) defeated Rian by pinfall	Singles match for the Future of Stardom Championship	12:33
3^{P}	Cosmic Angels (Yuna Mizumori, Aya Sakura and Sayaka Kurara) defeated Momo Kohgo, Ema Maishima and Kikyo Furusawa by pinfall	Six-woman tag team match	8:47
4	BMI2000 (Natsuko Tora and Ruaka) defeated FWC (Hazuki and Koguma) by pinfall	Tag team match	9:59
5	Risa Sera defeated Hanako by pinfall	Singles match	14:54
6	H.A.T.E. (Saya Kamitani, Momo Watanabe, Konami and Rina) defeated God's Eye (Ami Sohrei, Kiyoka Kotatsu, Lady C and Ranna Yagami) by pinfall	Eight-woman tag team match	16:29
7	wing★gori (Hanan and Saya Iida) (c) defeated Natsu & Saori (Natsupoi and Saori Anou) by pinfall	Tag team match for the Goddesses of Stardom Championship	17:08
8	Mi Vida Loca (Suzu Suzuki, Rina Yamashita, Itsuki Aoki and Akira Kurogane) defeated Neo Genesis (Starlight Kid, AZM, Mei Seira and Miyu Amasaki) by pinfall	No Disqualification Eight-woman tag team match	22:44
9	Sareee defeated Syuri (c) by pinfall	Singles match for the IWGP Women's Championship	32:49
(c) / – the champion(s) heading into the match; P / – the match was broadcast on the pre-show
