= Stardom The Conversion 2026 =

2026 World Wonder Ring Stardom event

Stardom The Conversion
- Promotional poster of the event
- Promotion: World Wonder Ring Stardom
- Date: June 20, 2026
- City: Tokyo, Japan
- Venue: Yoyogi National Gymnasium
- Attendance: 2,844

Event chronology
| ← Previous; Queens Dynasty | Next → 5 Star Grand Prix 2026 |

The Conversion chronology
| ← Previous; 2025 | Next → — |

Stardom The Conversion 2026 (スターダム・ザ・コンバージョン 2026, Sutādamu za konbājon 2026) was a professional wrestling event promoted by World Wonder Ring Stardom. The event took place on June 20, 2026, in Tokyo at Yoyogi National Gymnasium. In the main event, Suzu Suzuki defeated Sayaka Kurara to win the World of Stardom Championship.

== Production ==
=== Background ===
The show featured professional wrestling matches that result from scripted storylines, where wrestlers portray villains, heroes, or less distinguishable characters in the scripted events that build tension and culminate in a wrestling match or series of matches.

=== Event ===
The event started with two preshow singles confrontations. In the first one, Yuna Mizumori defeated Matoi Hamabe, and in the second one, Mei Seira picked up a victory over Ema Maishima.

In the first main card bout, Aya Sakura outmatched Anne Kanaya in singles competition. Next up, Ranna Yagami and Kiyoka Kotatsu picked up a victory in three-way tag team competition against the teams of Itsuki Aoki and Akira Kurogane, and Maika and Koguma. In the fifth match, Ami Sohrei, Lady C and Hina defeated Maki Itoh, Kikyo Furusawa and Rian to secure the second consecutive defense of the Artist of Stardom Championship in that respective reign. Next up, Natsupoi, Saori Anou, Fuwa-chan and Hazuki picked up a victory over (Natsuko Tora, Ruaka, Azusa Inaba and Fukigen Death in eight-woman tag team competition. The seventh bout saw Xena defeat Hanako in singles competition. Next up, Starlight Kid, AZM, Miyu Amasaki and Utami Hayashishita defeated Saya Kamitani, Konami, Momo Watanabe and Bea Priestley in eight-woman tag team competition. The eighth bout saw Syuri defeat Rina Yamashita to secure the fourth consecutive defense of the IWGP Women's Championship in that respective reign. After the bout concluded, Natsupoi stepped up as Syuri's next challenger. In the semi main event, Hanan defeated Saya Iida to secure the second consecutive defense of the Wonder of Stardom Championship in that respective reign.

During the event, All Elite Wrestling's Thekla made an appearance and attacked Stardom president Taro Okada, reigniting and older feud between them. Also during the event, Matoi Hamabe joined Stars.

In the main event, Suzu Suzuki defeated Sayaka Kurara to win the World of Stardom Championship, ending the latter's reign at 55 days and one defense.

== Results ==
| No. | Results | Stipulations | Times |
|---|---|---|---|
| 1^{P} | Yuna Mizumori defeated Matoi Hamabe by pinfall | Singles match | 5:47 |
| 2^{P} | Mei Seira defeated Ema Maishima by pinfall | Singles match | 9:10 |
| 3 | Aya Sakura defeated Anne Kanaya by pinfall | Singles match | 7:19 |
| 4 | God's Eye (Ranna Yagami and Kiyoka Kotatsu) defeated Mi Vida Loca (Itsuki Aoki and Akira Kurogane) and Fukuoka Triple Crazy (Maika and Koguma) by pinfall | Three-way tag team match | 5:31 |
| 5 | Dream Trine (Ami Sohrei, Lady C and Hina) (c) defeated Itoh Respect Army (Maki Itoh, Kikyo Furusawa and Rian) by pinfall | Six-woman tag team match for the Artist of Stardom Championship | 16:02 |
| 6 | Natsu & Saori (Natsupoi and Saori Anou), Fuwa-chan and Hazuki defeated H.A.T.E. (Natsuko Tora, Ruaka, Azusa Inaba and Fukigen Death) by pinfall | Eight-woman tag team match | 8:19 |
| 7 | Xena defeated Hanako by pinfall | Singles match | 10:18 |
| 8 | Neo Genesis (Starlight Kid, AZM and Miyu Amasaki) and Utami Hayashishita defeated H.A.T.E. (Saya Kamitani, Konami, Momo Watanabe and Bea Priestley) by pinfall | Eight-woman tag team match | 15:18 |
| 9 | Syuri (c) defeated Rina Yamashita by pinfall | Singles match for the IWGP Women's Championship | 21:18 |
| 10 | Hanan (c) defeated Saya Iida by pinfall | Singles match for the Wonder of Stardom Championship | 19:36 |
| 11 | Suzu Suzuki defeated Sayaka Kurara (c) by pinfall | Singles match for the World of Stardom Championship | 21:32 |
(c) / – the champion(s) heading into the match; P / – the match was broadcast on the pre-show
