= Stardom 5 Star Grand Prix 2025 =

2025 edition of the Stardom 5 Star Grand Prix

- Promotional poster of the tournament
- Promotion: World Wonder Ring Stardom
- Date: July 27 – August 23, 2025
- City: See venues
- Venue: See venues

Event chronology
| ← Previous; Sapporo World Rendezvous | Next → To The World |

Stardom 5Star Grand Prix Tournament chronology
| ← Previous; 2024 | Next → 2026 |

Stardom 5 Star Grand Prix 2025
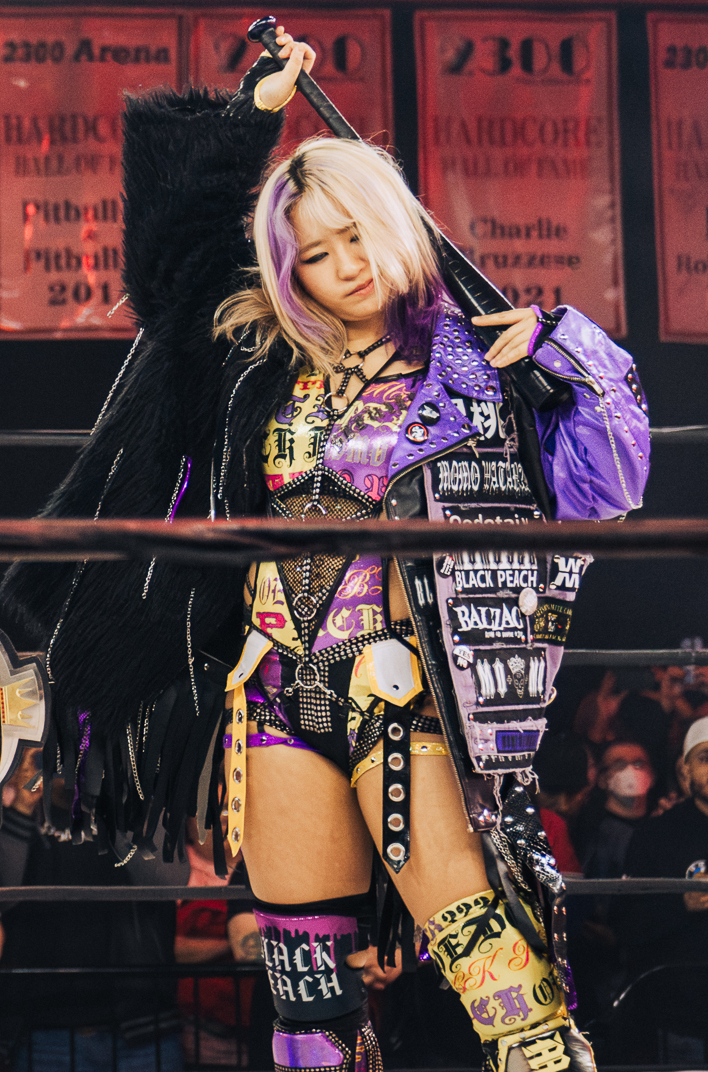
- Momo Watanabe, winner of the 2025 5 Star Grand Prix

Tournament information
- Sport: Professional wrestling
- Location: Japan
- Dates: July 27, 2025–August 23, 2025
- Tournament format: Four-block round-robin tournament
- Participants: 32

Final positions
- Champion: Momo Watanabe
- Runner-up: AZM

Tournament statistics
- Bouts fought: 124

Stardom 5 Star Grand Prix 2025 (スターダム5スターグランプリ2025, Sutādamu 5 sutāguranpuri 2025), often stylized as 5★Star GP 2025 was the fourteenth annual professional wrestling tournament under the Stardom 5Star Grand Prix Tournament branch promoted by the Japanese promotion World Wonder Ring Stardom. It took between July 27 and August 23, 2025.

== Tournament history ==
The Stardom 5 Star Grand Prix is a professional wrestling tournament held each summer by Stardom. Similar to New Japan Pro-Wrestling's G1 Climax tournament, it is currently held as a round-robin tournament with wrestlers split into four blocks. As is the case with G1 Climax, a win is two points and a draw is one point for each wrestler. The top 3 wrestlers in each block advance and enter into a single-elimination playoff bracket, with the block winners earning a bye into the quarterfinals.

=== Storylines ===
The event features professional wrestling matches that resulted from scripted storylines, where wrestlers portrayed villains, heroes, or less distinguishable characters in the scripted events that built tension and culminated in a wrestling match or series of matches.

=== Venues ===
| Dates | Venue | Location | Block play |
|---|---|---|---|
| July 27 | Ota City General Gymnasium | Ōta, Tokyo | Red Stars A and B, and Blue Stars A and B |
| July 30 | Morioka Gymnasium | Morioka, Iwate | Red Stars A and B |
| August 1 | Fukushima Big Palette Fukushima | Kōriyama, Fukushima | Blue Stars A and B |
| August 2 | Sendai PIT | Sendai, Miyagi | Red Stars A and B |
| August 3 | Utsunomiya Light Cube | Utsunomiya, Tochigi | Blue Stars A and B |
| August 3 | Utsunomiya Light Cube | Utsunomiya, Tochigi | Red Stars A and B |
| August 6 | Korakuen Hall | Bunkyo, Tokyo | Red Stars A and B, and Blue Stars A and B |
| August 9 | KBS Hall | Kamigyō-ku, Kyoto | Blue Stars A and B |
| August 10 | Okayama Convention Center | Okayama, Chūgoku | Red Stars A and B, and Blue Stars A |
| August 11 | Kobe Arts Center | Chūō-ku, Kobe City | Blue Stars A and B |
| August 16 | Yokohama Budokan | Naka-ku, Yokohama | Red Stars A and B, and Blue Stars A and B |
| August 17 | Act City Hamamatsu | Hamamatsu, Shizuoka | Red Stars A and B, and Blue Stars A and B |
| August 20 | Korakuen Hall | Bunkyo, Tokyo | Quarterfinals |
| August 23 | Ota City General Gymnasium | Ōta, Tokyo | Semifinals and final |

== Qualifiers ==
=== Qualifying matches ===
Sapporo World Rendezvous
| No. | Results | Stipulations | Times |
|---|---|---|---|
| 1 | Yuria Hime defeated Akira Kurogane | 5 Star Grand Prix Block A Qualifying match | 6:59 |

== Participants ==
*Noted underneath are the champions who held their titles at the time of the tournament. The titleholders or even the number of contestants can change over time.

| Wrestler | Unit | Notes |
|---|---|---|
| Ami Sohrei | God's Eye | |
| Aya Sakura | Cosmic Angels | |
| AZM | Neo Genesis | Strong Women's Champion; Artist of Stardom Champion |
| Azusa Inaba | H.A.T.E. | |
| Bea Priestley | Unaffiliated | Freelancer |
| Bozilla | Mi Vida Loca | Freelancer |
| Hanako | Empress Nexus Venus | New Blood Tag Team Champion |
| Hanan | Stars | |
| Hina | God's Eye | Future of Stardom Champion |
| Konami | H.A.T.E. | |
| Lady C | God's Eye | |
| Mei Seira | Neo Genesis | High Speed Champion |
| Miyu Amasaki | Neo Genesis | Artist of Stardom Champion |
| Momo Kohgo | Stars | |
| Momo Watanabe | H.A.T.E. | Winner |
| Natsuko Tora | H.A.T.E. | Goddesses of Stardom Champion |
| Natsupoi | Cosmic Angels | |
| Ranna Yagami | God's Eye | |
| Rian | Empress Nexus Venus | |
| Rina | H.A.T.E. | |
| Ruaka | H.A.T.E. | Goddesses of Stardom Champion |
| Saori Anou | Cosmic Angels | |
| Sareee | Unaffiliated | Freelancer; IWGP Women's Champion |
| Saya Iida | Stars | |
| Saya Kamitani | H.A.T.E. | World of Stardom Champion |
| Sayaka Kurara | Cosmic Angels | |
| Starlight Kid | Neo Genesis | Wonder of Stardom Champion; Artist of Stardom Champion |
| Suzu Suzuki | Mi Vida Loca | |
| Tomoka Inaba | God's Eye | |
| Waka Tsukiyama | Empress Nexus Venus | New Blood Tag Team Champion |
| Yuna Mizumori | Cosmic Angels | |
| Yuria Hime | Unaffiliated | Defeated Akira Kurogane to qualify into Blue Stars Block A |

== Blocks ==
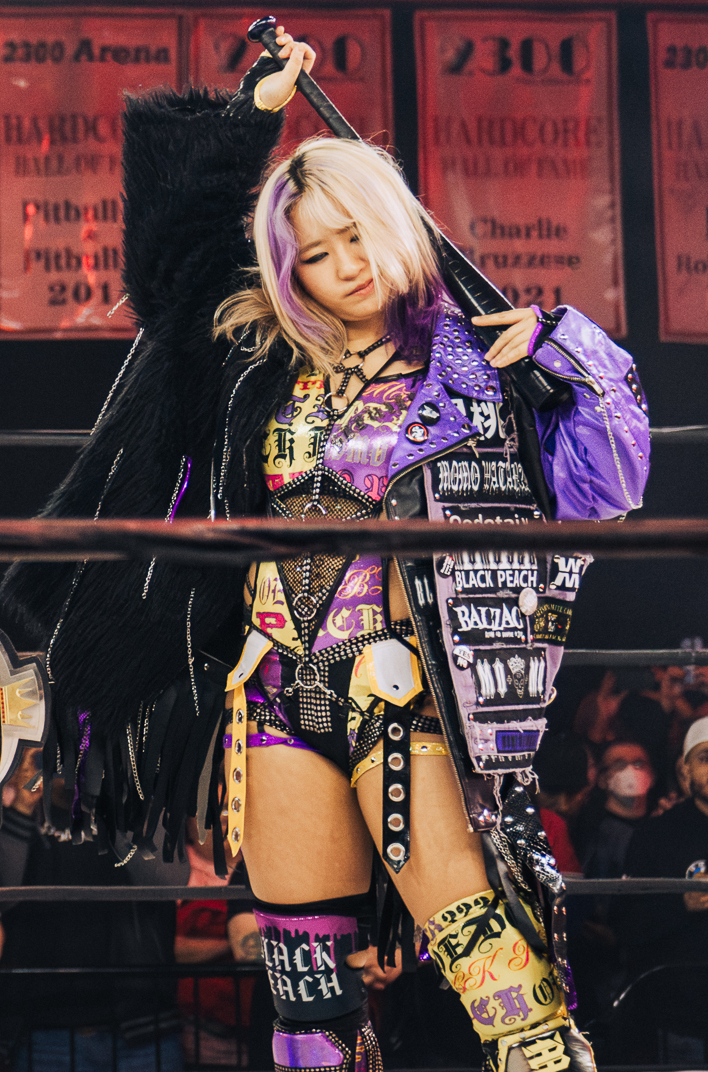
2025 Stardom 5Star Grand Prix winner Momo Watanabe

=== Overview ===
Current standings
| Blue Stars A | | Blue Stars B | | Red Stars A | | Red Stars B | |
| Saori Anou | 11 | Sareee | 11 | Saya Kamitani | 12 | Natsupoi | 10 |
| Ami Sohrei | 10 | Suzu Suzuki | 10 | Bea Priestley | 10 | AZM | 9 |
| Bozilla | 10 | Momo Watanabe | 8 | Hanan | 9 | Rina | 9 |
| Saya Iida | 8 | Hanako | 7 | Mei Seira | 7 | Tomoka Inaba | 8 |
| Ruaka | 7 | Ranna Yagami | 6 | Azusa Inaba | 6 | Starlight Kid | 8 |
| Miyu Amasaki | 6 | Hina | 6 | Lady C | 4 | Natsuko Tora | 8 |
| Aya Sakura | 4 | Konami | 6 | Yuna Mizumori | 4 | Sayaka Kurara | 4 |
| Yuria Hime | 0 | Momo Kohgo | 2 | Waka Tsukiyama | 4 | Rian | 0 |

| Blue Stars A | Iida | Amasaki | Anou | Sakura | Sohrei | Bozilla | Ruaka | Hime |
|---|---|---|---|---|---|---|---|---|
| Iida | —N/a | Iida (11:36) | Anou (10:50) | Iida (8:03) | Sohrei (12:00) | Bozilla (10:51) | Iida (5:05) | Iida (7:42) |
| Amasaki | Iida (11:36) | —N/a | Anou (10:03) | Sakura (3:59) | Amasaki (7:47) | Bozilla (5:34) | Amasaki (3:22) | Amasaki (2:42) |
| Anou | Anou (10:50) | Anou (10:03) | —N/a | Anou (10:04) | Sohrei (12:27) | Draw (15:00) | Anou (7:19) | Anou (6:41) |
| Sakura | Iida (8:03) | Sakura (3:59) | Anou (10:04) | —N/a | Sohrei (4:01) | Bozilla (10:15) | Ruaka (6:21) | Sakura (5:41) |
| Sohrei | Sohrei (12:00) | Amasaki (7:47) | Sohrei (12:27) | Sohrei (4:01) | —N/a | Sohrei (12:24) | Ruaka (10:10) | Sohrei (8:53) |
| Bozilla | Bozilla (10:51) | Bozilla (5:34) | Draw (15:00) | Bozilla (10:15) | Sohrei (12:24) | —N/a | Draw (8:42) | Bozilla (4:15) |
| Ruaka | Iida (5:05) | Amasaki (3:22) | Anou (7:19) | Ruaka (6:21) | Ruaka (10:10) | Draw (8:42) | —N/a | Ruaka (5:34) |
| Hime | Iida (7:42) | Amasaki (2:42) | Anou (6:41) | Sakura (5:41) | Sohrei (8:53) | Bozilla (4:15) | Ruaka (5:34) | —N/a |

| Blue Stars B | Sareee | Suzuki | Watanabe | Hina | Konami | Hanako | Kohgo | Yagami |
|---|---|---|---|---|---|---|---|---|
| Sareee | —N/a | Draw (15:00) | Sareee (12:29) | Sareee (13:03) | Konami (13:24) | Sareee (11:39) | Sareee (6:28) | Sareee (10:36) |
| Suzuki | Draw (15:00) | —N/a | Watanabe (13:12) | Suzuki (6:14) | Suzuki (10:00) | Draw (11:59) | Suzuki (6:51) | Suzuki (7:28) |
| Watanabe | Sareee (12:29) | Watanabe (13:12) | —N/a | Hina (9:17) | Watanabe (10:28) | Hanako (14:25) | Watanabe (2:51) | Watanabe (7:13) |
| Hina | Sareee (13:03) | Suzuki (6:14) | Hina (9:17) | —N/a | Hina (7:35) | Hina (7:53) | Kohgo (7:29) | Yagami (10:13) |
| Konami | Konami (13:24) | Suzuki (10:00) | Watanabe (10:28) | Hina (7:35) | —N/a | Konami (12:15) | Konami (7:42) | Yagami (7:09) |
| Hanako | Sareee (11:39) | Draw (11:59) | Hanako (14:25) | Hina (7:53) | Konami (12:15) | —N/a | Hanako (8:41) | Hanako (6:55) |
| Kohgo | Sareee (6:28) | Suzuki (6:51) | Watanabe (2:51) | Kohgo (7:29) | Konami (7:42) | Hanako (8:41) | —N/a | Yagami (6:44) |
| Yagami | Sareee (10:36) | Suzuki (7:28) | Watanabe (7:13) | Yagami (10:13) | Yagami (7:09) | Hanako (6:55) | Yagami (6:44) | —N/a |

| Red Stars A | Kamitani | Hanan | Seira | Mizumori | Lady C | Tsukiyama | Inaba | Priestley |
|---|---|---|---|---|---|---|---|---|
| Kamitani | —N/a | Kamitani (11:54) | Kamitani (11:48) | Kamitani (8:42) | Kamitani (7:25) | Kamitani (0:40) | Kamitani (8:01) | Priestley (13:05) |
| Hanan | Kamitani (11:54) | —N/a | Draw (15:00) | Hanan (6:44) | Hanan (8:35) | Hanan (1:12) | Inaba (5:37) | Hanan (12:20) |
| Seira | Kamitani (11:48) | Draw (15:00) | —N/a | Mizumori (9:28) | Seira (7:17) | Seira (0:28) | Inaba (9:38) | Seira (6:22) |
| Mizumori | Kamitani (8:42) | Hanan (6:44) | Mizumori (9:28) | —N/a | Lady C (6:56) | Mizumori (8:51) | Inaba (2:12) | Priestley (7:27) |
| Lady C | Kamitani (7:25) | Hanan (8:35) | Seira (7:17) | Lady C (6:56) | —N/a | Tsukiyama (6:39) | Lady C (8:24) | Priestley (8:36) |
| Tsukiyama | Kamitani (0:40) | Hanan (1:12) | Seira (0:28) | Mizumori (8:51) | Tsukiyama (6:39) | —N/a | Tsukiyama (0:48) | Priestley (4:53) |
| Inaba | Kamitani (8:01) | Inaba (5:37) | Inaba (9:38) | Inaba (2:12) | Lady C (8:24) | Tsukiyama (0:48) | —N/a | Priestley (10:26) |
| Priestley | Priestley (13:05) | Hanan (12:20) | Seira (6:22) | Priestley (7:27) | Priestley (8:36) | Priestley (4:53) | Priestley (10:26) | —N/a |

| Red Stars B | Kid | AZM | Natsupoi | Kurara | Inaba | Rian | Tora | Rina |
|---|---|---|---|---|---|---|---|---|
| Kid | —N/a | Draw (15:00) | Natsupoi (10:39) | Kid (11:21) | Inaba (14:13) | Kid (9:20) | Kid (13:48) | Draw (15:00) |
| AZM | Draw (15:00) | —N/a | AZM (2:35) | Kurara (9:06) | AZM (12:32) | AZM (10:41) | Tora (4:18) | AZM (11:50) |
| Natsupoi | Natsupoi (10:39) | AZM (2:35) | —N/a | Natsupoi (11:56) | Natsupoi (9:12) | Natsupoi (7:35) | Tora (10:05) | Natsupoi (12:02) |
| Kurara | Kid (11:21) | Kurara (9:06) | Natsupoi (11:56) | —N/a | Inaba (11:30) | Kurara (8:05) | Tora (9:46) | Rina (11:06) |
| Inaba | Inaba (14:13) | AZM (12:32) | Natsupoi (9:12) | Inaba (11:30) | —N/a | Inaba (7:43) | Inaba (12:46) | Rina (13:24) |
| Rian | Kid (9:20) | AZM (10:41) | Natsupoi (7:35) | Kurara (8:05) | Inaba (7:43) | —N/a | Tora (5:38) | Rina (6:35) |
| Tora | Kid (13:48) | Tora (4:18) | Tora (10:05) | Tora (9:46) | Inaba (12:46) | Tora (5:38) | —N/a | Rina (9:58) |
| Rina | Draw (15:00) | AZM (11:50) | Natsupoi (12:02) | Rina (11:06) | Rina (13:24) | Rina (6:35) | Rina (9:58) | —N/a |

Playoffs (August 20, 2025)
Blue B2 | Suzu Suzuki | Pin
Blue A3 | Bozilla | 11:35
Blue B3 | Momo Watanabe | Pin
Blue A2 | Ami Sohrei | 11:40
Red B2 | AZM | Sub
Red A3 | Hanan | 10:18
Red B3 | Rina | Pin
Red A2 | Bea Priestley | 11:25

Quarterfinals (August 20, 2025)
Blue A1 | Saori Anou | Pin
Blue B2 | Suzu Suzuki | 11:11
Blue B1 | Sareee | 15:13
Blue B3 | Momo Watanabe | Pin
Red A1 | Saya Kamitani | 12:27
Red B2 | AZM | Pin
Red B1 | Natsupoi | 13:23
Red B3 | Rina | Sub

Semifinals (August 23, 2025)
Blue A1 | Saori Anou | 14:02
Blue B3 | Momo Watanabe | Pin
Red B2 | AZM | Pin
Red B3 | Rina | 15:33

Final (August 23, 2025)
Blue B3 | Momo Watanabe | Pin
Red B2 | AZM | 21:11

== Results ==
=== Night 1 ===
The first night took place on July 27, 2025 at the Ota City General Gymnasium in Ota, Tokyo.

| No. | Results | Stipulations | Times |
|---|---|---|---|
| 1^{P} | Akira Kurogane and FWC (Hazuki and Koguma) defeated Saki Kashima, Ema Maishima and Kikyo Furusawa by pinfall | Six-woman tag team match | 12:28 |
| 2 | Saya Kamitani defeated Lady C by pinfall | Red Stars A Block singles match in the 5 Star Grand Prix tournament | 7:25 |
| 3 | Ami Sohrei defeated Aya Sakura by pinfall | Blue Stars A Block singles match in the 5 Star Grand Prix tournament | 4:01 |
| 4 | Miyu Amasaki defeated Yuria Hime by pinfall | Blue Stars A Block singles match in the 5 Star Grand Prix tournament | 2:42 |
| 5 | Rina defeated Rian by pinfall | Red Stars B Block singles match in the 5 Star Grand Prix tournament | 6:35 |
| 6 | Momo Watanabe defeated Momo Kohgo by submission | Blue Stars B Block singles match in the 5 Star Grand Prix tournament | 2:51 |
| 7 | Mei Seira defeated Waka Tsukiyama by pinfall | Red Stars A Block singles match in the 5 Star Grand Prix tournament | 0:28 |
| 8 | Suzu Suzuki defeated Hina by pinfall | Blue Stars B Block singles match in the 5 Star Grand Prix tournament | 6:14 |
| 9 | Hanako defeated Ranna Yagami by pinfall | Blue Stars B Block singles match in the 5 Star Grand Prix tournament | 6:55 |
| 10 | Bea Priestley defeated Yuna Mizumori by pinfall | Red Stars A Block singles match in the 5 Star Grand Prix tournament | 7:27 |
| 11 | Azusa Inaba defeated Hanan by pinfall | Red Stars A Block singles match in the 5 Star Grand Prix tournament | 5:37 |
| 12 | Bozilla vs. Ruaka ended in a double countout | Blue Stars A Block singles match in the 5 Star Grand Prix tournament | 8:42 |
| 13 | Saori Anou defeated Saya Iida by submission | Blue Stars A Block singles match in the 5 Star Grand Prix tournament | 10:50 |
| 14 | Natsuko Tora defeated AZM by pinfall | Red Stars B Block singles match in the 5 Star Grand Prix tournament | 4:18 |
| 15 | Tomoka Inaba defeated Starlight Kid by submission | Red Stars B Block singles match in the 5 Star Grand Prix tournament | 14:13 |
| 16 | Konami defeated Sareee by referee stoppage | Blue Stars B Block singles match in the 5 Star Grand Prix tournament | 13:24 |
| 17 | Natsupoi defeated Sayaka Kurara by pinfall | Red Stars B Block singles match in the 5 Star Grand Prix tournament | 11:56 |
P / – the match was broadcast on the pre-show

=== Night 2 ===
The second night took place on July 30, 2025 at the Musen Connect Morioka Arena in Morioka, Iwate.

| No. | Results | Stipulations | Times |
|---|---|---|---|
| 1 | Saya Kamitani defeated Yuna Mizumori by pinfall | Red Stars A Block singles match in the 5 Star Grand Prix tournament | 8:42 |
| 2 | Mei Seira defeated Lady C by submission | Red Stars A Block singles match in the 5 Star Grand Prix tournament | 7:27 |
| 3 | Starlight Kid defeated Rian by submission | Red Stars B Block singles match in the 5 Star Grand Prix tournament | 9:20 |
| 4 | Bea Priestley defeated Azusa Inaba by pinfall | Red Stars A Block singles match in the 5 Star Grand Prix tournament | 10:26 |
| 5 | AZM defeated Tomoka Inaba by pinfall | Red Stars B Block singles match in the 5 Star Grand Prix tournament | 12:32 |
| 6 | Hanan defeated Waka Tsukiyama by pinfall | Red Stars A Block singles match in the 5 Star Grand Prix tournament | 1:12 |
| 7 | Rina defeated Sayaka Kurara by pinfall | Red Stars B Block singles match in the 5 Star Grand Prix tournament | 11:06 |
| 8 | Natsuko Tora defeated Natsupoi by pinfall | Red Stars B Block singles match in the 5 Star Grand Prix tournament | 10:05 |

=== Night 3 ===
Night 3 took place on August 1, 2025 at Fukushima Big Pallette in Kōriyama, Fukushima.

| No. | Results | Stipulations | Times |
|---|---|---|---|
| 1^{P} | Kikyo Furusawa and Aya Sakura defeated Akira Kurogane and Ema Maishima by pinfall | Tag team match | 10:40 |
| 2 | Bozilla defeated Yuria Hime by pinfall | Blue Stars A Block singles match in the 5 Star Grand Prix tournament | 4:15 |
| 3 | Suzu Suzuki defeated Momo Kohgo by pinfall | Blue Stars B Block singles match in the 5 Star Grand Prix tournament | 6:51 |
| 4 | Sareee defeated Ranna Yagami by pinfall | Blue Stars B Block singles match in the 5 Star Grand Prix tournament | 10:36 |
| 5 | Saori Anou defeated Miyu Amasaki by pinfall | Blue Stars A Block singles match in the 5 Star Grand Prix tournament | 10:03 |
| 6 | Momo Watanabe defeated Konami by pinfall | Blue Stars B Block singles match in the 5 Star Grand Prix tournament | 10:28 |
| 7 | Ami Sohrei defeated Saya Iida by pinfall | Blue Stars A Block singles match in the 5 Star Grand Prix tournament | 12:00 |
P / – the match was broadcast on the pre-show

=== Night 4 ===
Night 4 took place on August 2, 2025 at Sendai PIT in Sendai, Miyagi.

| No. | Results | Stipulations | Times |
|---|---|---|---|
| 1 | Sayaka Kurara defeated Rian by pinfall | Red Stars B Block singles match in the 5 Star Grand Prix tournament | 8:05 |
| 2 | Bea Priestley defeated Waka Tsukiyama by pinfall | Red Stars A Block singles match in the 5 Star Grand Prix tournament | 4:53 |
| 3 | Natsupoi defeated Tomoka Inaba by pinfall | Red Stars B Block singles match in the 5 Star Grand Prix tournament | 9:12 |
| 4 | Saya Kamitani defeated Azusa Inaba by pinfall | Red Stars A Block singles match in the 5 Star Grand Prix tournament | 8:01 |
| 5 | Lady C defeated Yuna Mizumori by pinfall | Red Stars A Block singles match in the 5 Star Grand Prix tournament | 6:56 |
| 6 | Hanan vs. Mei Seira ended in a time-limit draw | Red Stars A Block singles match in the 5 Star Grand Prix tournament | 15:00 |
| 7 | Rina defeated Natsuko Tora by pinfall | Red Stars B Block singles match in the 5 Star Grand Prix tournament | 9:58 |
| 8 | Starlight Kid vs. AZM ended in a time-limit draw | Red Stars B Block singles match in the 5 Star Grand Prix tournament | 15:00 |

=== Day 5 (Afternoon) ===
Two shows were held on August 3, 2025 at Utsunomiya Light Cube in Utsunomiya, Tochigi, with the first show taking place in the afternoon.

| No. | Results | Stipulations | Times |
|---|---|---|---|
| 1 | Aya Sakura defeated Yuria Hime by pinfall | Blue Stars A Block singles match in the 5 Star Grand Prix tournament | 5:41 |
| 2 | Hanako defeated Momo Kohgo by pinfall | Blue Stars B Block singles match in the 5 Star Grand Prix tournament | 8:41 |
| 3 | Saya Iida defeated Ruaka by pinfall | Blue Stars A Block singles match in the 5 Star Grand Prix tournament | 5:05 |
| 4 | Ranna Yagami defeated Konami by pinfall | Blue Stars B Block singles match in the 5 Star Grand Prix tournament | 7:09 |
| 5 | Bozilla defeated Miyu Amasaki by pinfall | Blue Stars A Block singles match in the 5 Star Grand Prix tournament | 5:34 |
| 6 | Momo Watanabe defeated Suzu Suzuki by pinfall | Blue Stars B Block singles match in the 5 Star Grand Prix tournament | 13:12 |
| 7 | Ami Sohrei defeated Saori Anou by pinfall | Blue Stars A Block singles match in the 5 Star Grand Prix tournament | 12:25 |
| 8 | Sareee defeated Hina by pinfall | Blue Stars B Block singles match in the 5 Star Grand Prix tournament | 13:03 |

=== Day 5 (Evening) ===
The second show took place in the evening.

| No. | Results | Stipulations | Times |
|---|---|---|---|
| 1 | Saya Kamitani defeated Waka Tsukiyama by pinfall | Red Stars A Block singles match in the 5 Star Grand Prix tournament | 0:40 |
| 2 | Natsuko Tora defeated Rian by pinfall | Red Stars B Block singles match in the 5 Star Grand Prix tournament | 5:38 |
| 3 | Lady C defeated Azusa Inaba by pinfall | Red Stars A Block singles match in the 5 Star Grand Prix tournament | 8:24 |
| 4 | Starlight Kid defeated Sayaka Kurara by pinfall | Red Stars B Block singles match in the 5 Star Grand Prix tournament | 11:21 |
| 5 | Yuna Mizumori defeated Mei Seira by pinfall | Red Stars A Block singles match in the 5 Star Grand Prix tournament | 9:28 |
| 6 | AZM defeated Natsupoi by pinfall | Red Stars B Block singles match in the 5 Star Grand Prix tournament | 2:35 |
| 7 | Rina defeated Tomoka Inaba by pinfall | Red Stars B Block singles match in the 5 Star Grand Prix tournament | 13:24 |
| 8 | Hanan defeated Bea Priestley by pinfall | Red Stars A Block singles match in the 5 Star Grand Prix tournament | 12:20 |

=== Night 6 ===
The sixth night took place at Korakuen Hall in Bunkyo, Tokyo on August 6, 2025.

| No. | Results | Stipulations | Times |
|---|---|---|---|
| 1 | Momo Watanabe defeated Ranna Yagami by pinfall | Blue Stars B Block singles match in the 5 Star Grand Prix tournament | 7:13 |
| 2 | Mei Seira defeated Bea Priestley by pinfall | Red Stars A Block singles match in the 5 Star Grand Prix tournament | 6:22 |
| 3 | Azusa Inaba defeated Yuna Mizumori by pinfall | Red Stars A Block singles match in the 5 Star Grand Prix tournament | 2:12 |
| 4 | Ruaka defeated Ami Sohrei by pinfall | Blue Stars A Block singles match in the 5 Star Grand Prix tournament | 10:10 |
| 5 | Natsuko Tora defeated Sayaka Kurara by pinfall | Red Stars B Block singles match in the 5 Star Grand Prix tournament | 9:46 |
| 6 | Hanako vs. Suzu Suzuki ended in a double countout | Blue Stars B Block singles match in the 5 Star Grand Prix tournament | 11:59 |
| 7 | Hina defeated Konami by pinfall | Blue Stars B Block singles match in the 5 Star Grand Prix tournament | 7:35 |
| 8 | Bozilla vs. Saori Anou ended in a time-limit draw | Blue Stars A Block singles match in the 5 Star Grand Prix tournament | 15:00 |
| 9 | AZM defeated Rina by pinfall | Red Stars B Block singles match in the 5 Star Grand Prix tournament | 11:50 |
| 10 | Saya Kamitani defeated Hanan by pinfall | Red Stars A Block singles match in the 5 Star Grand Prix tournament | 11:54 |

=== Night 7 ===
The seventh night took place at KBS Hall in Kamigyō-ku, Kyoto on August 8, 2025.

| No. | Results | Stipulations | Times |
|---|---|---|---|
| 1 | Ami Sohrei defeated Yuria Hime by pinfall | Blue Stars A Block singles match in the 5 Star Grand Prix tournament | 8:53 |
| 2 | Konami defeated Momo Kohgo by submission | Blue Stars B Block singles match in the 5 Star Grand Prix tournament | 7:42 |
| 3 | Bozilla defeated Aya Sakura by pinfall | Blue Stars A Block singles match in the 5 Star Grand Prix tournament | 10:15 |
| 4 | Saori Anou defeated Ruaka by pinfall | Blue Stars A Block singles match in the 5 Star Grand Prix tournament | 7:19 |
| 5 | Ranna Yagami defeated Hina by pinfall | Blue Stars B Block singles match in the 5 Star Grand Prix tournament | 10:31 |
| 6 | Suzu Suzuki vs. Sareee ended in a time-limit draw | Blue Stars B Block singles match in the 5 Star Grand Prix tournament | 15:00 |
| 7 | Saya Iida defeated Miyu Amasaki by pinfall | Blue Stars A Block singles match in the 5 Star Grand Prix tournament | 11:36 |
| 8 | Hanako defeated Momo Watanabe by pinfall | Blue Stars B Block singles match in the 5 Star Grand Prix tournament | 14:25 |

=== Night 8 ===
The eighth night took place on August 10, 2025 at Okayama Convention Center in Okayama, Chūgoku.

| No. | Results | Stipulations | Times |
|---|---|---|---|
| 1 | AZM defeated Rian by pinfall | Red Stars B Block singles match in the 5 Star Grand Prix tournament | 10:41 |
| 2 | Yuna Mizumori defeated Waka Tsukiyama by pinfall | Red Stars A Block singles match in the 5 Star Grand Prix tournament | 8:51 |
| 3 | Azusa Inaba defeated Mei Seira by pinfall | Red Stars A Block singles match in the 5 Star Grand Prix tournament | 9:38 |
| 4 | Ruaka defeated Aya Sakura by pinfall | Blue Stars A Block singles match in the 5 Star Grand Prix tournament | 6:21 |
| 5 | Hanan defeated Lady C by pinfall | Red Stars A Block singles match in the 5 Star Grand Prix tournament | 8:35 |
| 6 | Tomoka Inaba defeated Sayaka Kurara by submission | Red Stars B Block singles match in the 5 Star Grand Prix tournament | 11:30 |
| 7 | Natsupoi defeated Rina by pinfall | Red Stars B Block singles match in the 5 Star Grand Prix tournament | 12:02 |
| 8 | Starlight Kid defeated Natsuko Tora by submission | Red Stars B Block singles match in the 5 Star Grand Prix tournament | 13:48 |

=== Night 9 ===
The ninth night took place on August 11, 2025 at Kobe Arts Center in Chūō-ku, Kobe City.

| No. | Results | Stipulations | Times |
|---|---|---|---|
| 1 | Ruaka defeated Yuria Hime by pinfall | Blue Stars A Block singles match in the 5 Star Grand Prix tournament | 5:34 |
| 2 | Ranna Yagami defeated Momo Kohgo by pinfall | Blue Stars B Block singles match in the 5 Star Grand Prix tournament | 6:44 |
| 3 | Miyu Amasaki defeated Ami Sohrei by pinfall | Blue Stars A Block singles match in the 5 Star Grand Prix tournament | 7:47 |
| 4 | Hina defeated Momo Watanabe by pinfall | Blue Stars B Block singles match in the 5 Star Grand Prix tournament | 9:17 |
| 5 | Bozilla defeated Saya Iida by pinfall | Blue Stars A Block singles match in the 5 Star Grand Prix tournament | 10:51 |
| 6 | Sareee defeated Hanako by pinfall | Blue Stars B Block singles match in the 5 Star Grand Prix tournament | 11:39 |
| 7 | Suzu Suzuki defeated Konami by pinfall | Blue Stars B Block singles match in the 5 Star Grand Prix tournament | 10:00 |
| 8 | Saori Anou defeated Aya Sakura by pinfall | Blue Stars A Block singles match in the 5 Star Grand Prix tournament | 10:04 |

=== Night 10 ===
The tenth night took place on August 16, 2025 at Yokohama Budokan in Naka-ku, Yokohama.

| No. | Results | Stipulations | Times |
|---|---|---|---|
| 1 | Natsupoi defeated Rian by pinfall | Red Stars B Block singles match in the 5 Star Grand Prix tournament | 7:35 |
| 2 | Momo Kohgo defeated Hina by pinfall | Blue Stars B Block singles match in the 5 Star Grand Prix tournament | 7:29 |
| 3 | Saori Anou defeated Yuria Hime by submission | Blue Stars A Block singles match in the 5 Star Grand Prix tournament | 6:41 |
| 4 | Miyu Amasaki defeated Ruaka by pinfall | Blue Stars A Block singles match in the 5 Star Grand Prix tournament | 3:22 |
| 5 | Saya Iida defeated Aya Sakura by pinfall | Blue Stars A Block singles match in the 5 Star Grand Prix tournament | 8:03 |
| 6 | Waka Tsukiyama defeated Azusa Inaba by pinfall | Red Stars A Block singles match in the 5 Star Grand Prix tournament | 0:48 |
| 7 | Bea Priestley defeated Lady C by pinfall | Red Stars A Block singles match in the 5 Star Grand Prix tournament | 8:36 |
| 8 | Konami defeated Hanako by submission | Blue Stars B Block singles match in the 5 Star Grand Prix tournament | 12:15 |
| 9 | Tomoka Inaba defeated Natsuko Tora by submission | Red Stars B Block singles match in the 5 Star Grand Prix tournament | 12:46 |
| 10 | Starlight Kid vs Rina ended in a time-limit draw | Red Stars B Block singles match in the 5 Star Grand Prix tournament | 15:00 |
| 11 | Saya Kamitani defeated Mei Seira by pinfall | Red Stars A Block singles match in the 5 Star Grand Prix tournament | 11:48 |
| 12 | Sareee defeated Momo Watanabe by pinfall | Blue Stars B Block singles match in the 5 Star Grand Prix tournament | 12:29 |

=== Night 11 ===
The eleventh night took place on August 17, 2025 at Act City Hamamatsu in Hamamatsu, Shizuoka.

| No. | Results | Stipulations | Times |
|---|---|---|---|
| 1 | Saya Iida defeated Yuria Hime by pinfall | Blue Stars A Block singles match in the 5 Star Grand Prix tournament | 7:42 |
| 2 | Tomoka Inaba defeated Rian by pinfall | Red Stars B Block singles match in the 5 Star Grand Prix tournament | 7:43 |
| 3 | Waka Tsukiyama defeated Lady C by pinfall | Red Stars A Block singles match in the 5 Star Grand Prix tournament | 6:39 |
| 4 | Aya Sakura defeated Miyu Amasaki by pinfall | Blue Stars A Block singles match in the 5 Star Grand Prix tournament | 3:59 |
| 5 | Sareee defeated Momo Kohgo by pinfall | Blue Stars B Block singles match in the 5 Star Grand Prix tournament | 6:28 |
| 6 | Hina defeated Hanako by pinfall | Blue Stars B Block singles match in the 5 Star Grand Prix tournament | 7:53 |
| 7 | Suzu Suzuki defeated Ranna Yagami by pinfall | Blue Stars B Block singles match in the 5 Star Grand Prix tournament | 7:28 |
| 8 | Hanan defeated Yuna Mizumori by pinfall | Red Stars A Block singles match in the 5 Star Grand Prix tournament | 6:44 |
| 9 | Sayaka Kurara defeated AZM by pinfall | Red Stars B Block singles match in the 5 Star Grand Prix tournament | 9:06 |
| 10 | Natsupoi defeated Starlight Kid by pinfall | Red Stars B Block singles match in the 5 Star Grand Prix tournament | 10:39 |
| 11 | Ami Sourei defeated Bozilla by pinfall | Blue Stars A Block singles match in the 5 Star Grand Prix tournament | 12:24 |
| 12 | Bea Priestley defeated Saya Kamitani by pinfall | Red Stars A Block singles match in the 5 Star Grand Prix tournament | 13:06 |

=== Night 12 ===
The twelfth night, including the playoff and quarterfinal rounds of the tournament, took place on August 20, 2025 at Korakuen Hall in Bunkyo, Tokyo.

| No. | Results | Stipulations | Times |
|---|---|---|---|
| 1 | Suzu Suzuki defeated Bozilla by pinfall | Blue Stars playoff singles match in the 5 Star Grand Prix tournament | 11:35 |
| 2 | AZM defeated Hanan by submission | Red Stars playoff singles match in the 5 Star Grand Prix tournament | 10:18 |
| 3 | Momo Watanabe defeated Ami Sohrei by pinfall | Blue Stars playoff singles match in the 5 Star Grand Prix tournament | 11:40 |
| 4 | Rina defeated Bea Priestley by pinfall | Red Stars playoff singles match in the 5 Star Grand Prix tournament | 11:25 |
| 5 | Ema Maishima and Yuria Hime defeated Akira Kurogane and Kikyo Furusawa by submission | Tag team match | 5:19 |
| 6 | Saori Anou defeated Suzu Suzuki by pinfall | Blue Stars Quarterfinals singles match in the 5 Star Grand Prix tournament | 11:11 |
| 7 | AZM defeated Saya Kamitani by pinfall | Red Stars Quarterfinals singles match in the 5 Star Grand Prix tournament | 12:27 |
| 8 | Momo Watanabe (with Natsuko Tora, Ruaka and Saya Kamitani) defeated Sareee by pinfall | Blue Stars Quarterfinals singles match in the 5 Star Grand Prix tournament | 15:13 |
| 9 | Rina defeated Natsupoi by submission | Red Stars Quarterfinals singles match in the 5 Star Grand Prix tournament | 13:23 |

=== Night 13 ===
The thirteenth and final night, including the semifinal and final round of the tournament, took place on August 23, 2025 at Ota City General Gymnasium in Ōta, Tokyo.

| No. | Results | Stipulations | Times |
|---|---|---|---|
| 1 | Peach & Lily (Momo Kohgo and Yuria Hime) defeated God's Eye (Lady C and Kiyoka Kotatsu), Kikyo Furusawa and Ema Maishima, and H.A.T.E. (Fukigen Death and Azusa Inaba) by pinfall | Four-way tag team match | 6:09 |
| 2 | H.A.T.E. (Natsuko Tora, Saya Kamitani and Ruaka) defeated Bea Priestley and wing★gori (Hanan and Saya Iida) by pinfall | Six-woman tag team match | 8:06 |
| 3 | AZM defeated Rina by pinfall | Red Stars Semifinals singles match in the 5 Star Grand Prix tournament | 15:33 |
| 4 | Momo Watanabe (with Natsuko Tora, Ruaka and Saya Kamitani) defeated Saori Anou by pinfall | Blue Stars Semifinals singles match in the 5 Star Grand Prix tournament | 14:02 |
| 5 | Cosmic Angels (Natsupoi, Aya Sakura and Sayaka Kurara) defeated Empress Nexus Venus (Waka Tsukiyama, Hanako and Rian) by pinfall | Six-woman tag team match | 8:11 |
| 6 | Yuna Mizumori defeated Saki Kashima and Mei Seira by pinfall | Three-way match | 4:51 |
| 7 | Mi Vida Loca (Suzu Suzuki, Rina Yamashita and Akira Kurogane) defeated Dark Silueta and FWC (Hazuki and Koguma) by pinfall | Six-woman tag team match | 11:03 |
| 8 | God's Eye (Ami Sohrei and Tomoka Inaba) defeated Neo Genesis (Starlight Kid and Miyu Amasaki) by pinfall | Tag team match | 11:11 |
| 9 | Hina (c) defeated Ranna Yagami by submission | Singles match for the Future of Stardom Championship | 11:14 |
| 10 | Sareee (c) defeated Konami by pinfall | Singles match for the IWGP Women's Championship | 18:15 |
| 11 | Momo Watanabe defeated AZM by pinfall | 5 Star Grand Prix tournament final | 21:11 |
(c) / – the champion(s) heading into the match

== See also ==
- G1 Climax
- N-1 Victory
