= Stardom New Blood 26 =

2025 World Wonder Ring Stardom event

New Blood 26
- Promotional artwork of the event
- Promotion: World Wonder Ring Stardom
- Date: October 30, 2025
- City: Tokyo, Japan
- Venue: Kanda Myojin Hall
- Attendance: 239

Event chronology
← Previous; New Blood 25	Next → Crimson Nightmare

New Blood chronology
← Previous; New Blood 25	Next → New Blood 27

Stardom New Blood 26 (スターダム ニュー ブラッド 26, Sutādamu nyū Buraddo 26) was a professional wrestling event promoted by World Wonder Ring Stardom. The event took place on October 30, 2025, in Tokyo, Japan at the Kanda Myojin Hall.

== Production ==
=== Background ===
"New Blood" is a series of events that mainly focus on matches where rookie wrestlers, usually with three or fewer years of in-ring experience, evolve. Besides wrestlers from Stardom, various superstars from multiple promotions of the Japanese independent scene are invited to compete in bouts that are usually going under the stipulation of singles or tag team matches.

=== Event ===
The event started with the singles confrontation between Ema Maishima and Kikyo Furusawa, solded with the victory of the latter. Next up, Himiko picked up a victory over Akira Kurogane in another singles bout. The third match saw Yuki Mashiro defeat Rian in singles competition as well. In the semi main event, Ram Kaicho, Azusa Inaba and Debbie Keitel defeated Tomoka Inaba, Ranna Yagami and Kiyoka Kotatsu in six-woman tag team competition.

In the main event, Aya Sakura and Sayaka Kurara defeated Waka Tsukiyama and Hanako to win the New Blood Tag Team Championship, ending the latter team's reign at 308 days and four defenses.

== Results ==
No.	Results	Stipulations	Times
1	Kikyo Furusawa defeated Ema Maishima	Singles match	7:33
2	Himiko defeated Akira Kurogane	Singles match	10:26
3	Yuki Mashiro defeated Rian	Singles match	10:11
4	Ram Kaicho, Azusa Inaba and Debbie Keitel defeated God's Eye (Tomoka Inaba, Ranna Yagami and Kiyoka Kotatsu)	Six-woman tag team match	12:13
5	Sakurara (Aya Sakura and Sayaka Kurara) defeated Rice or Bread (Waka Tsukiyama and Hanako) (c)	Tag team match for the New Blood Tag Team Championship	17:15
(c) / – the champion(s) heading into the match
