= Stardom to the World =

2025 World Wonder Ring Stardom event

- Promotional poster of the event featuring Saya Kamitani and Bea Priestley
- Promotion: World Wonder Ring Stardom
- Date: September 6, 2025
- City: Yokohama, Japan
- Venue: Yokohama Budokan
- Attendance: 1,814

Event chronology
← Previous; 5 Star Grand Prix 2025	Next → New Blood 24

Stardom to the World chronology
← Previous; First	Next → 2026

Stardom to the World (世界へのスターダム, Sekai e no sutādamu) was a professional wrestling event promoted by World Wonder Ring Stardom. The event took place on September 6, 2025, in Yokohama, Japan, at the Yokohama Budokan.

Eleven matches were contested at the event, including three on the pre-show. In the main event, Saya Kamitani defeated Bea Priestley to retain the World of Stardom Championship. In other prominent matches, Starlight Kid defeated Tomoka Inaba to retain the Wonder of Stardom Championship, and Sareee defeated Suzu Suzuki to retain the IWGP Women's Championship.

== Production ==
=== Background ===
The show featured professional wrestling matches that result from scripted storylines, where wrestlers portray villains, heroes, or less distinguishable characters in the scripted events that build tension and culminate in a wrestling match or series of matches.

=== Event ===
The event started with three preshow bouts broadcast live on Stardom's YouTube channel. In the first one, Rian defeated Akira Kurogane and Kaori Yoneyama in three-way action. In the second one, Rina picked up a victory over Ema Maishima in singles competition, and in the third one, Waka Tsukiyama and Hanako defeated Aya Sakura and Kikyo Furusawa in tag team action. The preshow concluded with the 2025 Stardom 5 Star Grand Prix award ceremony.

In the first main card bout, Mei Seira and Consejo Mundial de Lucha Libre's Dark Silueta defeated Yuna Mizumori and Sayaka Kurara in tag team competition. Next up, Momo Watanabe, Konami and Azusa Inaba outmatched (Bozilla, Rina Yamashita and Itsuki Aoki in six-woman tag team competition. In the sixth bout, Saki Kashima, Hina, Ranna Yagami and Kiyoka Kotatsu defeated Hanan, Saya Iida, Momo Kohgo and Yuria Hime in eight-woman tag team competition. The seventh bout saw Ami Sohrei and Lady C defeat Hazuki and Koguma, AZM and Miyu Amasaki, and Natsupoi and Saori Anou in foru-way tag team competition. In the eighth bout, Natsuko Tora defeated Mayumi Ozaki in singles competition. Next up, Sareee defeated Suzu Suzuki to secure the second consecutive defense of the Wonder of Stardom Championship in that respective reign. In the semi main event, Starlight Kid defeated Tomoka Inaba to secure the sixth consecutive defense of the Wonder of Stardom Championship in that respective reign.

In the main event, Saya Kamitani defeated Bea Priestley to secure the fifth consecutive defense of the World of Stardom Championship in that respective reign. After the bout concluded, AZM stepped up and challenged Kamitani to a match which was scheduled as a winner takes all, also contested for AZM's Strong Women's Championship, on September 27, 2025.

== Results ==
No.	Results	Stipulations	Times
1^{P}	Rian defeated Akira Kurogane and Fukigen Death	Three-way match	5:01
2^{P}	Rina defeated Ema Maishima	Singles match	8:38
3^{P}	Rice Or Bread (Waka Tsukiyama and Hanako) defeated Aya Sakura and Kikyo Furusawa	Tag team match	8:26
4	Mei Seira and Dark Silueta defeated Cosmic Angels (Yuna Mizumori and Sayaka Kurara)	Tag team match	9:43
5	H.A.T.E. (Momo Watanabe, Konami and Azusa Inaba) defeated Mi Vida Loca (Bozilla, Rina Yamashita and Itsuki Aoki)	Six-woman tag team match	10:14
6	God's Eye (Saki Kashima, Hina, Ranna Yagami and Kiyoka Kotatsu) defeated Stars (Hanan, Saya Iida, Momo Kohgo and Yuria Hime)	Eight-woman tag team match	10:26
7	Reiwa Tokyo Towers (Ami Sohrei and Lady C) defeated FWC (Hazuki and Koguma), 02line (AZM and Miyu Amasaki) and Natsu & Saori (Natsupoi and Saori Anou)	Four-way tag team match	6:25
8	Natsuko Tora defeated Mayumi Ozaki	Singles match	12:43
9	Sareee (c) defeated Suzu Suzuki	Singles match for the IWGP Women's Championship	22:33
10	Starlight Kid (c) defeated Tomoka Inaba	Singles match for the Wonder of Stardom Championship	21:15
11	Saya Kamitani (c) defeated Bea Priestley	Singles match for the World of Stardom Championship	22:34
(c) / – the champion(s) heading into the match; P / – the match was broadcast on the pre-show
