= Stardom Queens Dynasty =

2026 World Wonder Ring Stardom event

- Promotional poster for the event featuring various wrestlers
- Promotion: World Wonder Ring Stardom
- Date: May 23, 2026
- City: Inazawa, Japan
- Venue: Toyoda Gosei Memorial Gymnasium
- Attendance: 1,854

Event chronology
← Previous; All Star Grand Queendom	Next → The Conversion

Stardom Queens Dynasty (スターダム・クイーンズ・ダイナスティ, Sutādamu kuīnzu dainasuti) was a professional wrestling event promoted by World Wonder Ring Stardom. The event took place on May 23, 2026, in Inazawa, Japan at the Toyoda Gosei Memorial Gymnasium.

== Production ==
=== Storylines ===
The show featured ten professional wrestling matches that result from scripted storylines, where wrestlers portray villains, heroes, or less distinguishable characters in the scripted events that built tension and culminate in a wrestling match or series of matches.

=== Event ===
The event started with three preshow bouts broadcast live on Stardom's YouTube channel. First was the three-way confrontation between Rian, Matoi Hamabe and Waka Tsukiyama, won by the latter. In the second one, Syuri picked up a victory over Kiyoka Kotatsu in singles competition, and in the third one, Saya Kamitani and Ruaka outmatched Saori Anou and Fuwa-chan in tag team competition.

In the first main card bout, Saya Iida defeated Hanako and Xena in three-way competition. Next up, Ami Sourei, Lady C and Hina defeated the teams of Natsupoi, Aya Sakura and Yuna Mizumori, and Rina Yamashita, Itsuki Aoki and Akira Kurogane to become the number one contenders for the Artist of Stardom Championship. In the sixth bout, Hazuki and Koguma defeated AZM and Ema Maishima in which was initially scheduled as a Goddesses of Stardom Championship defense for AZM and Miyu Amasaki, and later being scrapped due to the latter not being medically cleared to compete. After the bout concluded, AZM invited Maishima to join the Neo Genesis stable, offer which the latter respectfully turned down for the time being. Next up, Ranna Yagami defeated Kikyo Furusawa to secure the fourth consecutive defense of the Future of Stardom Championship in that respective reign. Next up, Suzu Suzuki defeated Maika and Starlight Kid and Natsuko Tora to become number one contender for the World of Stardom Championship. In the semi main event, Hanan defeated Bea Priestley to secure the first successful defense of the Wonder of Stardom Championship in that respective reign.

In the main event, Sayaka Kurara defeated Maki Itoh to secure the first successful defense of the World of Stardom Championship in that respective reign.

== Results ==
No.	Results	Stipulations	Times
1^{P}	Waka Tsukiyama defeated Rian and Matoi Hamabe by pinfall	Three-way match	5:29
2^{P}	Syuri defeated Kiyoka Kotatsu by submission	Singles match	10:03
3^{P}	H.A.T.E. (Saya Kamitani and Ruaka) defeated Saori Anou and Fuwa-chan by pinfall	Tag team match	9:20
4	Saya Iida defeated Hanako and Xena by pinfall	Three-way match	10:19
5	God's Eye (Ami Sourei, Lady C and Hina) defeated Cosmic Angels (Natsupoi, Aya Sakura and Yuna Mizumori) and Mi Vida Loca (Rina Yamashita, Itsuki Aoki and Akira Kurogane) by pinfall	Three-way six-woman tag team no. 1 contendership match for the Artist of Stardom Championship	10:22
6	FWC (Hazuki and Koguma) defeated AZM and Ema Maishima by pinfall	Tag team match	14:44
7	Ranna Yagami (c) defeated Kikyo Furusawa by submission	Singles match for the Future of Stardom Championship	10:45
8	Suzu Suzuki defeated Maika and Starlight Kid and Natsuko Tora by pinfall	Four-way no. 1 contendership match for the World of Stardom Championship	13:17
9	Hanan (c) defeated Bea Priestley by pinfall	Singles match for the Wonder of Stardom Championship	20:02
10	Sayaka Kurara (c) defeated Maki Itoh by pinfall	Singles match for the World of Stardom Championship	21:51
(c) / – the champion(s) heading into the match; P / – the match was broadcast on the pre-show
