= Stardom All Star Grand Queendom 2026 =

2026 World Wonder Ring Stardom event

- Promotional poster for the event featuring various wrestlers
- Promotion: World Wonder Ring Stardom
- Date: April 26, 2026
- City: Yokohama, Japan
- Venue: Yokohama Arena
- Attendance: 8,015

Event chronology
← Previous; American Dream 2026	Next → Queens Dynasty

Grand Queendom chronology
← Previous; 2025	Next → —

Stardom All Star Grand Queendom (スターダム オールスター グランドクイーンダム, Sutādamu ōrusutā gurandokuīndamu) was a professional wrestling event promoted by World Wonder Ring Stardom. The event took place on April 26, 2026, in Yokohama at Yokohama Arena. It was the fourth event under the All Star Grand Queendom chronology.

The event also featured Saki Kashima's retirement ceremony.

== Production ==
=== Storylines ===
The show featured twelve professional wrestling matches that result from scripted storylines, where wrestlers portray villains, heroes, or less distinguishable characters in the scripted events that built tension and culminate in a wrestling match or series of matches.

=== Event ===
The event started with three preshow bouts. The first one was portrayed by the singles confrontation between Kikyo Furusawa and Aya Sakura, solded with the victory of the latter. In the second one, Kiyoka Kotatsu and Matoi Hamabe picked up a victory over Akira Kurogane and Anne Kanaya in tag team competition. The third one saw Xena outmatch Yuna Mizumori, Momo Kohgo, Lady C, Tomoka Inaba and Tabata in six-way elimination competition.

In the first main card bout, Maki Itoh picked up a victory over Natsupoi in singles competition. Next up, Hazuki and Koguma won a gauntlet tag team match by last eliminating the team of Saya Iida and Bea Priestley. The sixth bout saw Ranna Yagami defeated Ema Maishima to secure the third consecutive defense of the Future of Stardom Championship in that respective reign. Next up, Fuwa-chan defeated Saori Anou in singles competition. Between the seventh and the eighth bout of the event, the official retirement ceremony of Saki Kashima took place. The ceremony featured various professional wrestling personalities such as Tomohiro Ishii who handed Kashima flowers and commentator Teppei Arita who paid a video tribute to her.

In the eighth bout, Suzu Suzuki and Rina Yamashita defeated Maika and Hanako who reunited for one night after then-time recent dissolution of the Empress Nexus Venus stable. Next up, Syuri defeated Megan Bayne to secure the third consecutive defense of the IWGP Women's Championship in that respective reign. The tenth bout saw AZM and Miyu Amasaki defeat Natsuko Tora and Ruaka to win the Goddesses of Stardom Championship, ending the latter team's reign at 276 days and five defenses.

In the semi main event, 2026 Cinderella Tournament winner Hanan defeated Konami to win the Wonder of Stardom Championship, ending the latter's reign at 174 days and four defenses. After the bout concluded, Bea Priestley turned on the stable of Stars, joining H.A.T.E., and challenging Hanan for the latter's newly won title. This was widely seen as a spinoff of Priestley's heel turn from her first tenure with Stardom in which she was once part of Oedo Tai.

In the main event, Sayaka Kurara defeated Saya Kamitani to win the World of Stardom Championship, ending the latter's reign at 483 days and nine defenses. Had Kurara lost, Cosmic Angels, the stable which she was part of would've been forced to disband.

== Results ==
No.	Results	Stipulations	Times
1^{P}	Aya Sakura defeated Kikyo Furusawa by pinfall	Singles match	10:12
2^{P}	Kiyoka Kotatsu and Matoi Hamabe defeated Akira Kurogane and Anne Kanaya by pinfall	Tag team match	6:06
3^{P}	Xena defeated Yuna Mizumori, Momo Kohgo, Lady C, Tomoka Inaba and Tabata by pinfall	Six-way match	6:55
4	Maki Itoh defeated Natsupoi by pinfall	Singles match	10:14
5	FWC (Hazuki and Koguma) defeated Stars (Bea Priestley and Saya Iida), God's Eye (Ami Sourei and Hina), Neo Genesis (Starlight Kid and Mei Seira),Waka Tsukiyama and Rian, and Devil Princess (Rina and Azusa Inaba) by pinfall	Gauntlet tag team match	24:57
6	Ranna Yagami (c) defeated Ema Maishima by submission	Singles match for the Future of Stardom Championship	8:11
7	Fuwa-chan defeated Saori Anou by pinfall	Singles match	16:56
8	Bloody Girls' School (Suzu Suzuki and Rina Yamashita) defeated Maika and Hanako by pinfall	Hardcore tag team match	19:41
9	Syuri (c) defeated Megan Bayne by submission	Singles match for the IWGP Women's Championship	17:19
10	02line (AZM and Miyu Amasaki) defeated BMI2000 (Natsuko Tora and Ruaka) (c) by pinfall	Tag team match for the Goddesses of Stardom Championship	23:19
11	Hanan defeated Konami (c) by pinfall	Singles match for the Wonder of Stardom Championship	18:07
12	Sayaka Kurara defeated Saya Kamitani (c)	Singles match for the World of Stardom Championship; If Kurara had lost, Cosmic Angels would've been forced to disband.	27:05
(c) / – the champion(s) heading into the match; P / – the match was broadcast on the pre-show

== See also ==
- 2026 in professional wrestling
- List of major World Wonder Ring Stardom events
