= Stardom New Blood 23 =

2025 World Wonder Ring Stardom event

New Blood 23
- Promotional artwork of the event
- Promotion: World Wonder Ring Stardom
- Date: July 4, 2025
- City: Tokyo, Japan
- Venue: Tokyo Square
- Attendance: 153

Event chronology
← Previous; The Conversion	Next → Sapporo World Rendezvous

New Blood chronology
← Previous; New Blood 22	Next → New Blood 24

Stardom New Blood 23 (スターダム ニュー ブラッド 23, Sutādamu nyū Buraddo 23) was a professional wrestling event promoted by World Wonder Ring Stardom. The event took place on July 4, 2025, in Tokyo, Japan at the Tokyo Square.

== Production ==
=== Background ===
"New Blood" is a series of events that mainly focus on matches where rookie wrestlers, usually with three or fewer years of in-ring experience, evolve. Besides wrestlers from Stardom, various superstars from multiple promotions of the Japanese independent scene are invited to compete in bouts that are usually going under the stipulation of singles or tag team matches.

The show featured professional wrestling matches that result from scripted storylines, where wrestlers portray villains, heroes, or less distinguishable characters in the scripted events that build tension and culminate in a wrestling match or series of matches.

=== Event ===
The entire event was broadcast live on Stardom's YouTube channel. It started with the singles confrontation between Ema Maishima and Rina which ended with a referee stoppage victory for Maishima after Rina got concussed mid-match. Next up, Kiyoka Kotatsu picked up a victory over Kikyo Furusawa in another singles bout. The third match saw Rian and Honoka defeat Saran and Asuka Goda in tag team competition. In the semi main event, Hina, Lady C and Ranna Yagami picked up a victory over Aya Sakura, Sayaka Kurara and Akira Kurogane in six-woman tag team competition.

In the main event, Waka Tsukiyama and Hanako defeated Momo Kohgo and Yuria Hime to secure the fourth consecutive defense of the New Blood Tag Team Championship in that respective reign.

== Results ==
No.	Results	Stipulations	Times
1	Ema Maishima defeated Rina by referee stoppage	Singles match	6:30
2	Kiyoka Kotatsu defeated Kikyo Furusawa by pinfall	Singles match	6:28
3	Rian and Honoka defeated Saran and Asuka Goda by pinfall	Tag team match	13:04
4	God's Eye (Hina, Lady C and Ranna Yagami) defeated Sakurara (Aya Sakura and Sayaka Kurara) and Akira Kurogane by pinfall	Six-woman tag team match	15:23
5	Rice or Bread (Waka Tsukiyama and Hanako) (c) defeated Peach & Lily (Momo Kohgo and Yuria Hime) by pinfall	Tag team match for the New Blood Tag Team Championship	15:32
(c) / – the champion(s) heading into the match
