= Stardom Sapporo World Rendezvous 2025 =

2025 World Wonder Ring Stardom event

- Promotional poster of the event
- Promotion: World Wonder Ring Stardom
- Date: July 21, 2025
- City: Sapporo, Japan
- Venue: Chateraise Gateaux Kingdom Sapporo
- Attendance: 1,056

Event chronology
| ← Previous; New Blood 23 | Next → 5 Star Grand Prix 2025 |

Sapporo World Rendezvous chronology
| ← Previous; 2024 | Next → — |

Stardom Sapporo World Rendezvous 2025 (スターダム サッポロワールドランデブー 2025, Sutādamu sapporowārudorandebū 2025) was a professional wrestling event promoted by World Wonder Ring Stardom. The event took place on July 21, 2025, in Sapporo at Chateraise Gateaux Kingdom Sapporo.

Eight matches were contested at the event, including three on the pre-show, and three of Stardom's nine championships were on the line. The main event saw Saya Kamitani defeat Natsupoi to retain the World of Stardom Championship. In another prominent match, Starlight Kid defeated Saori Anou to retain the Wonder of Stardom Championship.

== Production ==
=== Background ===
The show featured professional wrestling matches that result from scripted storylines, where wrestlers portray villains, heroes, or less distinguishable characters in the scripted events that build tension and culminate in a wrestling match or series of matches.

=== Event ===
The event started with three pre-show matches which were broadcast live on Stardom's YouTube channel. In the first one, Rian defeated Ema Maishima in singles competition. In the second one, Hina picked up a victory over Sayaka Kurara to secure the fifth consecutive defense of the Future of Stardom Championship in that respective reign, and in the third, Yuria Hime defeated Akira Kurogane to qualify in the last spot of the 5 Star Grand Prix 2025 Stars Block A.

In the first main card bout, Suzu Suzuki, Rina Yamashita and Bozilla picked up a victory over AZM, Miyu Amasaki and Mei Seira in six-woman tag team competition, three days ahead of Bozilla and AZM's match for the Strong Women's Championship which was set to occur on July 24, 2025. Next up, Lady C and Ami Sourei outmatched the teams of Aya Sakura and Yuna Mizumori, Waka Tsukiyama and Hanako, and Hazuki and Koguma in four-way tag team competition. In the sixth bout, Kikyo Furusawa, Momo Kohgo and Goddesses of Stardom Champions Hanan and Saya Iida and defeated Natsuko Tora, Ruaka, Momo Watanabe and Konami in eight-woman tag team competition. In the semi main event, Starlight Kid defeated Saori Anou to secure the fifth consecutive defense of the Wonder of Stardom Championship in that respective reign.

In the main event, Saya Kamitani defeated Natsupoi to secure the fourth consecutive defense of the World of Stardom Championship in that respective reign.

== Results ==
| No. | Results | Stipulations | Times |
|---|---|---|---|
| 1^{P} | Rian defeated Ema Maishima by pinfall | Singles match | 8:12 |
| 2^{P} | Hina (c) defeated Sayaka Kurara by pinfall | Singles match for the Future of Stardom Championship | 13:23 |
| 3^{P} | Yuria Hime defeated Akira Kurogane by pinfall | 5 Star Grand Prix Blue Stars Block A qualifier | 6:59 |
| 4 | Mi Vida Loca (Suzu Suzuki, Rina Yamashita and Bozilla) defeated Neo Genesis (AZM, Miyu Amasaki and Mei Seira) by pinfall | Six-woman tag team match | 8:42 |
| 5 | Reiwa Tokyo Towers (Lady C and Ami Sourei) defeated Sakuradamon (Aya Sakura and Yuna Mizumori), Rice or Bread (Waka Tsukiyama and Hanako), and FWC (Hazuki and Koguma) by pinfall | Four-way tag team match | 7:45 |
| 6 | Kikyo Furusawa and Stars (Hanan, Saya Iida and Momo Kohgo) defeated H.A.T.E. (Natsuko Tora, Ruaka, Momo Watanabe and Konami) by pinfall | Eight-woman tag team match | 8:49 |
| 7 | Starlight Kid (c) defeated Saori Anou by submission | Singles match for the Wonder of Stardom Championship | 21:38 |
| 8 | Saya Kamitani (c) defeated Natsupoi by pinfall | Singles match for the World of Stardom Championship | 24:54 |
(c) / – the champion(s) heading into the match; P / – the match was broadcast on the pre-show
