= Historic X-Over in Guangzhou =

2025 professional wrestling event

- Promotional poster featuring various NJPW, Stardom, and INFIN wrestlers.
- Promotion(s): New Japan Pro-Wrestling; World Wonder Ring Stardom; INFIN
- Date: October 5, 2025
- City: Guangzhou, China
- Venue: 66 Livehouse
- Attendance: N/A

Historic X-Over chronology
← Previous; Historic X-Over 2	Next → —

New Japan Pro-Wrestling event chronology
← Previous; Destruction in Kobe	Next → King of Pro-Wrestling

World Wonder Ring Stardom event chronology
← Previous; New Blood 24	Next → New Blood 25

Historic X-Over in Guangzhou (pronounced Historic Crossover in Guangzhou) was a professional wrestling event co-promoted by New Japan Pro-Wrestling (NJPW), its subsidiary World Wonder Ring Stardom (Stardom) and Chinese promotion INFIN. It took place on October 5, 2025, in Guangzhou, China, at the 66 Livehouse. It was the first-ever event promoted by NJPW in China since 1992.

== Production ==
=== Background ===
On January 31, 2012, card game company Bushiroad fully acquired New Japan Pro-Wrestling (NJPW) from video game developer Yuke's, and on October 17, 2019, Bushiroad announced in a press conference that they had also acquired World Wonder Ring Stardom (Stardom). NJPW and Stardom hold the first Historic X-Over on November 20, 2022, at Ariake Arena in Tokyo, which was considered a success with over 7,000 fans attending the event.

=== Storylines ===
Historic X-Over in Guangzhou featured professional wrestling matches that result from scripted storylines, where wrestlers portray villains, heroes, or less distinguishable characters in the scripted events that build tension and culminate in a wrestling match or series of matches.

=== Event ===
The event started with the tag team confrontation between Starlight Kid and Miyu Amasaki, and Lady C and Ami Sohrei, solded with the victory of the latters. Next up, T-Light and Lin Dong Xuan defeated The Coolie and Feng Jianlang in tag team competition. The third bout saw Wang Xinxuan and Jun Jie picking up a victory over Cheng Oa and Gao Jinjia. Next up, Hanako defeated Aya Sakura to secure the first defense of the Future of Stardom Championship in tat respective reign. the fifth bout saw Master Wato defeat Ryusuke Taguchi in singles competition. Next up, Zack Sabre Jr. also outmatched Kushida in singles competition.

In the main event, Natsupoi, Saori Anou, and Sayaka Kurara defeated Natsuko Tora, Ruaka, and Rina in six-woman tag team competition.

== Results ==
No.	Results	Stipulations	Times
1	Tokyo Towers (Lady C and Ami Sohrei) defeated Neo Genesis (Starlight Kid and Miyu Amasaki)	Tag team match	10:52
2	T-Light and Lin Dong Xuan defeated The Coolie and Feng Jianlang	Tag team match	8:53
3	Sino Badboys (Wang Xinxuan and Jun Jie) defeated Drunken Chicken (Cheng Oa and Gao Jinjia)	Tag team match	12:20
4	Hanako (c) defeated Aya Sakura	Singles match for the Future of Stardom Championship	13:01
5	Master Wato defeated Ryusuke Taguchi	Singles match	10:15
6	Zack Sabre Jr. defeated Kushida	Singles match	17:05
7	Cosmic Angels (Natsupoi, Saori Anou, and Sayaka Kurara) defeated H.A.T.E. (Natsuko Tora, Ruaka, and Rina)	Six-woman tag team match	12:09
(c) / – the champion(s) heading into the match

== See also ==
- 2025 in professional wrestling
- List of major NJPW events
- List of major World Wonder Ring Stardom events
