= Stardom New Blood 18 =

2025 World Wonder Ring Stardom event

New Blood 18
- Promotional artwork of the event
- Promotion: World Wonder Ring Stardom
- Date: February 5, 2025
- City: Tokyo, Japan
- Venue: Tokyo Square
- Attendance: 201

Event chronology
← Previous; Supreme Fight	Next → Path of Thunder

New Blood chronology
← Previous; New Blood 17	Next → New Blood 19

Stardom New Blood 18 (スターダム ニュー ブラッド 18, Sutādamu nyū Buraddo 18) was a professional wrestling event promoted by World Wonder Ring Stardom. The event took place on February 5, 2025, in Tokyo, Japan at the Tokyo Square.

Five matches were contested at the event. The main event saw God's Eye (Ranna Yagami and Nanami) and Himiko defeat Cosmic Angels (Yuna Mizumori, Aya Sakura and Sayaka Kurara).

== Production ==
=== Background ===
"New Blood" is a series of events that mainly focus on matches where rookie wrestlers, usually with three or fewer years of in-ring experience, evolve. Besides wrestlers from Stardom, various superstars from multiple promotions of the Japanese independent scene are invited to compete in bouts that are usually going under the stipulation of singles or tag team matches.

The show featured professional wrestling matches that result from scripted storylines, where wrestlers portray villains, heroes, or less distinguishable characters in the scripted events that build tension and culminate in a wrestling match or series of matches.

=== Event ===
The entire event was broadcast live on Stardom's YouTube channel. In the first bout, New Blood Tag Team Champions Waka Tsukiyama and Hanako defeated Akira Kurogane and Yuria Hime in a non-title match. Next up, Kaori Yoneyama picked up a victory over Rian in singles competition. The third bout saw Tomoka Inaba, Hina and Kiyoka Kotatsu outmatched Kohaku, Honoka and Saran in six-woman tag team competition. In the semi main event, Rina and Azusa Inaba picked up a victory over Mizuki Kato and Yuma Makoto in tag team competition.

In the main event, Ranna Yagami, Nanami and Himiko defeated Yuna Mizumori, Aya Sakura and Sayaka Kurara in six-woman tag team competition. After the bout concluded, Nanami and Himiko stepped up to challenge Waka Tsukiyama and Hanako for the New Blood Tag Team Championship in a bout which was scheduled for New Blood 19 on March 1, 2025.

== Results ==
No.	Results	Stipulations	Times
1	Rice or Bread (Waka Tsukiyama and Hanako) defeated Akira Kurogane and Yuria Hime	Tag team match	8:36
2	Kaori Yoneyama defeated Rian	Singles match	7:32
3	God's Eye (Tomoka Inaba, Hina and Kiyoka Kotatsu) defeated Kohaku, Honoka and Saran	Six-woman tag team match	10:31
4	Devil Princess (Rina and Azusa Inaba) defeated Mizuki Kato and Yuma Makoto	Tag team match	16:35
5	God's Eye (Ranna Yagami and Nanami) and Himiko defeated Cosmic Angels (Yuna Mizumori, Aya Sakura and Sayaka Kurara)	Six-woman tag team match	19:07
