= Professional wrestling in China =

Professional wrestling in China has been a rarity since it became a republic in 1912.

== History ==
Professional wrestling originates from Japan has a long backstory with various organizations bickering back and forth, it is unclear how big the market is in China, and indeed, if there would even be enough to argue about.(this makes no sense and is not what the source is saying) Ashley Desilva is a local independent wrestler who has performed all over the country, and wrestles under the ring name Ash Silva. He says that China is a fertile ground for professional wrestling.

Beginning in the mid-2010s, the United States-based WWE, expanded its market into China by performing several house shows in Shanghai and Beijing. The WWE Network over the top streaming service, launched in 2014, is currently available in Hong Kong and Macau.

Notably one of the WWE's profile stars, John Cena, speaks Mandarin.

== Promotions ==
- Dragon Fighting Wrestling
- Middle Kingdom Wrestling
- Oriental Wrestling Entertainment

== Notable wrestlers ==
- Xia Li
- Tian Bing
- Yinling
- Ho Ho Lun

== See also ==
- Sport in China
