= Ema Maishima =

Japanese professional wrestler

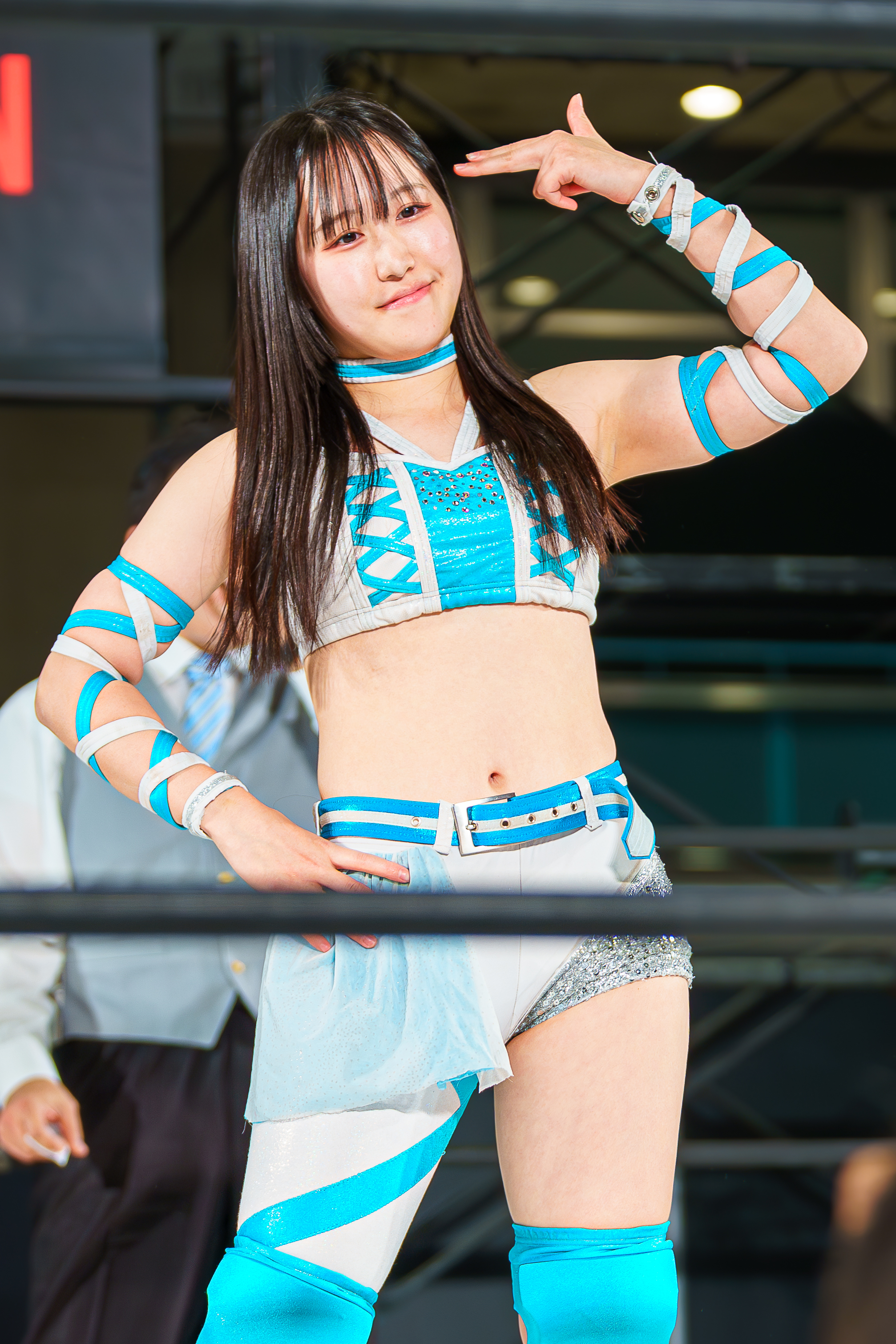
- Ema in December 2025

Personal information
- Born: Mai Matsuda; June 22, 2003 (age 23) Kashiwara, Osaka, Japan

Professional wrestling career
- Ring name: Ema Maishima
- Billed height: 156 cm (5 ft 1 in)
- Billed weight: 53 kg (117 lb)
- Trained by: AZM
- Debut: May 21, 2025

Mai Matsuda, better known by her ring name Ema Maishima, (儛島 エマ, Maishima Ema; born June 22, 2003) is a Japanese professional wrestler. She works for World Wonder Ring Stardom, where she is a member of the Neo Genesis stable.

== Early life ==
Maishima enlisted in the Japan Ground Self-Defense Force after graduating high school in order to train for professional wrestling.

== Professional wrestling career ==
=== World Wonder Ring Stardom (2025–present) ===
Maishima made her official in-ring debut at Korakuen Hall on May 21, 2025, losing to AZM.

On July 4, 2025 at New Blood 23, Maishima achieved her first victory, defeating Rina after a referee stoppage.

Maishima entered and won the 2026 Stardom Rookie of the Year Tournament, defeating Kikyo Furusawa in the final to earn the right to challenge for the Future of Stardom Championship.

At All Star Grand Queendom 2026, Maishima lost to defending champion Ranna Yagami.

==== Neo Genesis (2026–present) ====
During Queens Dynasty, Maishima stepped in for the sidelined Miyu Amasaki to team with AZM against Hazuki and Koguma. After their defeat, AZM invited Maishima to join the Neo Genesis stable, but Maishima asked for more time to think about it.

After losing in a singles match to Amasaki at STARDOM in Sendai on June 6, 2026, Maishima asked to join the faction, and was formally accepted by Starlight Kid, Mei Seira, AZM and Amasaki.

== Championships and accomplishments ==
- World Wonder Ring Stardom
  - Stardom Rookie of the Year (2026)
