= Kikyo Furusawa =

Japanese professional wrestler

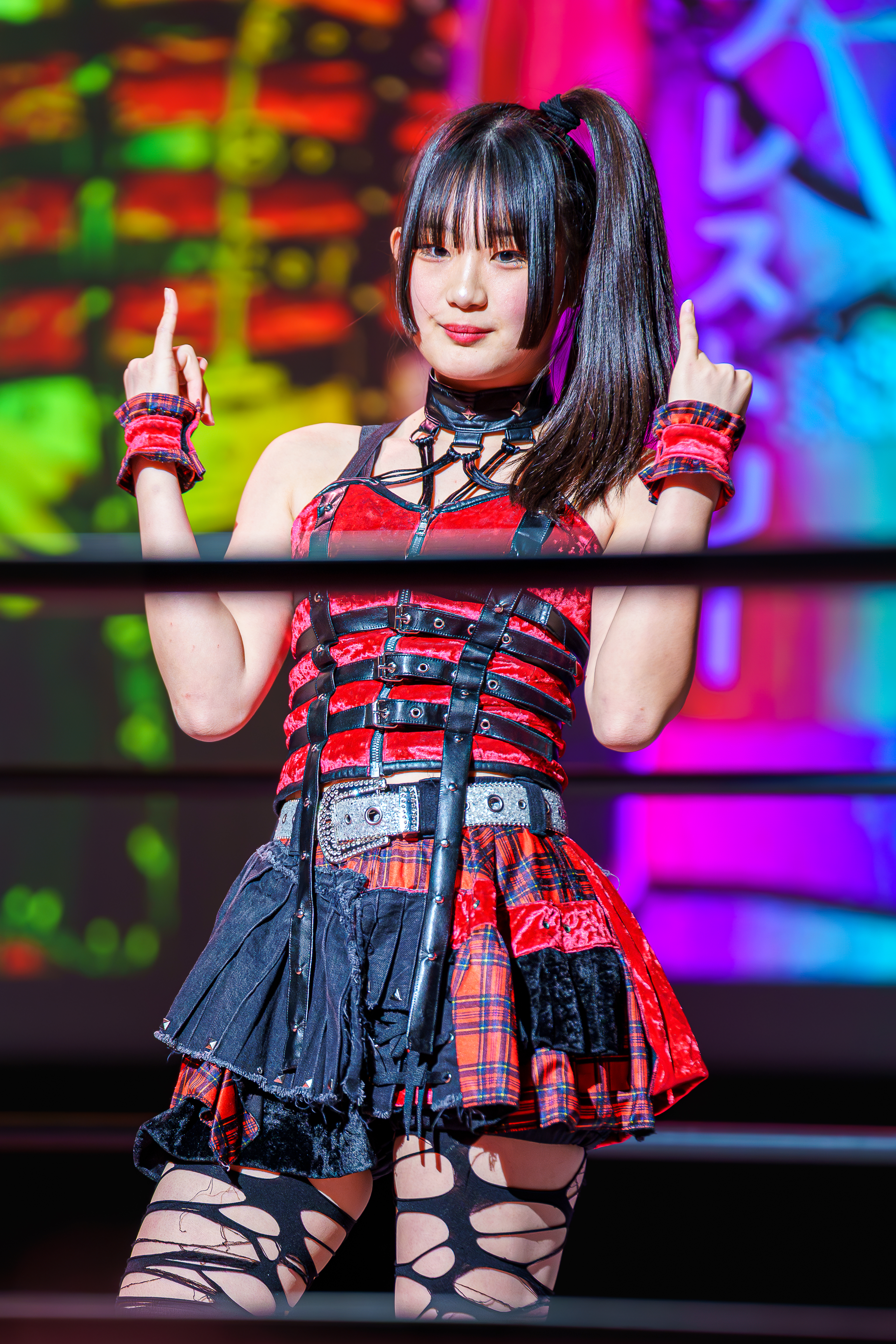
- Kikyo in November 2025

Personal information
- Born: An Toyoshima; December 23, 2003 (age 22) Fujinomiya, Shizuoka, Japan

Professional wrestling career
- Ring name: Kikyo Furusawa
- Billed height: 160 cm (5 ft 3 in)
- Billed weight: 51 kg (112 lb)
- Trained by: Milano Collection A.T.
- Debut: May 21, 2025

An Toyoshima, better known by her ring name Kikyo Furusawa (古沢 稀杏, Furusawa Kikyo; born December 23, 2003) is a Japanese professional wrestler. She is signed to World Wonder Ring Stardom, where she is one-half of the current New Blood Tag Team Champions alongside Rian in their first reign.

== Professional wrestling career ==
=== World Wonder Ring Stardom (2025–present) ===
Toyoshima made her official in-ring debut at Korakuen Hall on May 21, 2025 unser the ring name Kikyo Furusawa, in a losing effort against Hanan.

At New Blood 26 on October 30, 2025, Furusawa achieved her first singles match victory, defeating Ema Maishima by submission.

On October 20, 2026, at Stardom Nighter in Korakuen, Meni☆Mani (Furusawa and Rian) defeated Sakurara (Aya Sakura and Sayaka Kurara) to win the New Blood Tag Team Championship, marking Furusawa's first title in Stardom.

== Championships and accomplishments ==
- World Wonder Ring Stardom
  - New Blood Tag Team Championship (1 time, current) – with Rian
