= Maya Fukuda =

Japanese professional wrestler (born 2000)

Kiyoka Kotatsu
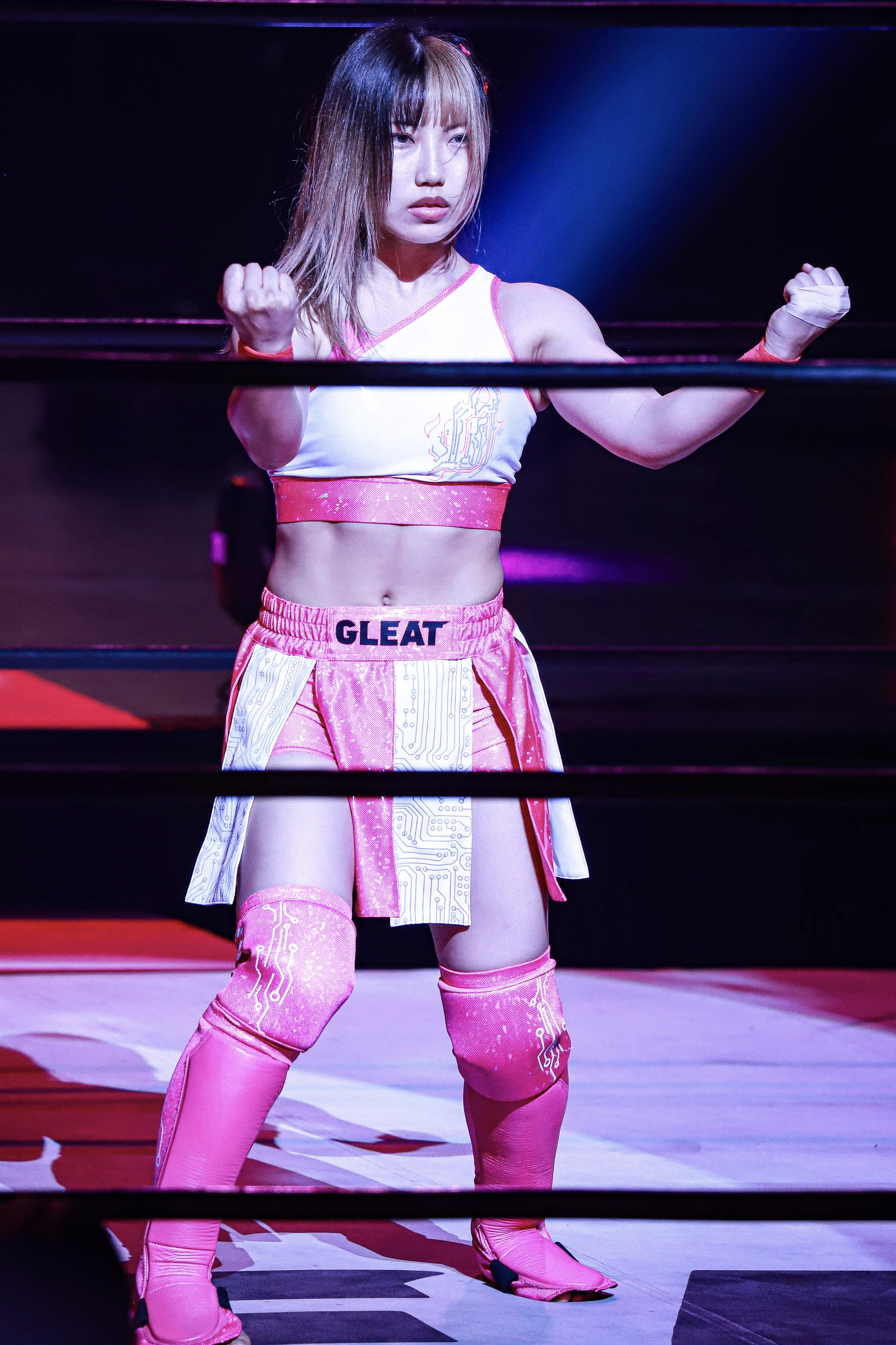
- Kotatsu in July 2023

Personal information
- Born: 1 December 2000 (age 25) Ōra, Japan

Professional wrestling career
- Ring name: Maya Fukuda Kiyoka Kotatsu
- Billed height: 156 cm (5 ft 1 in)
- Billed weight: 50 kg (110 lb)
- Trained by: Kiyoshi Tamura; Syuri
- Debut: 2021

Maya Fukuda (福田 茉耶, Fukuda Maya), better known by her ring name Kiyoka Kotatsu (虎龍清花, Kotatsu Kiyoka), is a Japanese professional wrestler, actress, and former idol, kickboxer and karateka. She is signed to World Wonder Ring Stardom, where she is a member of God's Eye. She is also known for her tenure with Gleat and other promotions from the Japanese independent scene.

== Professional wrestling career ==
=== Gleat (2021–2024) ===
Fukuda made her professional wrestling debut in Gleat at GLEAT Ver. 1 on July 1, 2021, where she fell short to Chihiro Hashimoto in an UWF Rules match. During her tenure with the promotion, she has only competed in UWF Rules bouts. Fukuda made her last appaearance in the promotion at GLEAT LIDET UWF Ver. 4 on April 17, 2024, where she fell defeated Yura Suzuki.

Fukuda made a one-time appearance in the GCW Bloodsport series of events, making her debut at Josh Barnett's Bloodsport Bushido on June 22, 2024, where she fell short to Konami.

=== World Wonder Ring Stardom (2024–present) ===
Fukuda signed with World Wonder Ring Stardom in December 2024. At Stardom Dream Queendom 2024 on December 29, after Syuri's victory over Konami, Fukuda helped Syuri fight off the members of H.A.T.E., thus declaring her siding with the God's Eye leader and being presented as the unit's newest member at the time.

Fukuda made her in-ring debut in the promotion at Stardom New Year Dream on January 3, 2025, where she teamed up with Syuri and Tomoka Inaba to defeat H.A.T.E.'s Momo Watanabe, Fukigen Death and Azusa Inaba in a Six-woman tag team match. At Stardom Supreme Fight 2025 on February 2, she teamed up with Syuri, Saki Kashima and Tomoka Inaba to defeat Stars (Mayu Iwatani, Hazuki, Hanan and Momo Kohgo) in eight-woman tag team competition. During her first years in Stardom, Fukuda frequently competed in the New Blood series of events. She made her debut at Stardom New Blood 18 on February 5, 2025, where she teamed up with stablemates Tomoka Inaba and Hina to defeat Kohaku, Honoka and Saran. At Stardom Path of Thunder on February 24, 2025, she teamed up with Syuri in a losing effort against Konami and Azusa Inaba. At Stardom All Star Grand Queendom 2025 on April 27, she competed in a Stardom Rumble match for a future title match of the winner's choice, bout won by Hanako.

== Kickboxing record ==
Professional Kickboxingrecord
0 wins, 2 losses, 0 draws
Date	Result	Opponent	Event	Location	Method	Round	Time
2023-08-04	Loss	Nao Morita	GLEAT ver.MEGA	Tokyo, Japan	TKO	2	1:45
2022-12-14	Loss	Minori Kikuchi	Gleat MMA Ver.0	Tokyo, Japan	Decision (unanimous)	3	3:00
