= Akira Kurogane =

Japanese professional wrestler

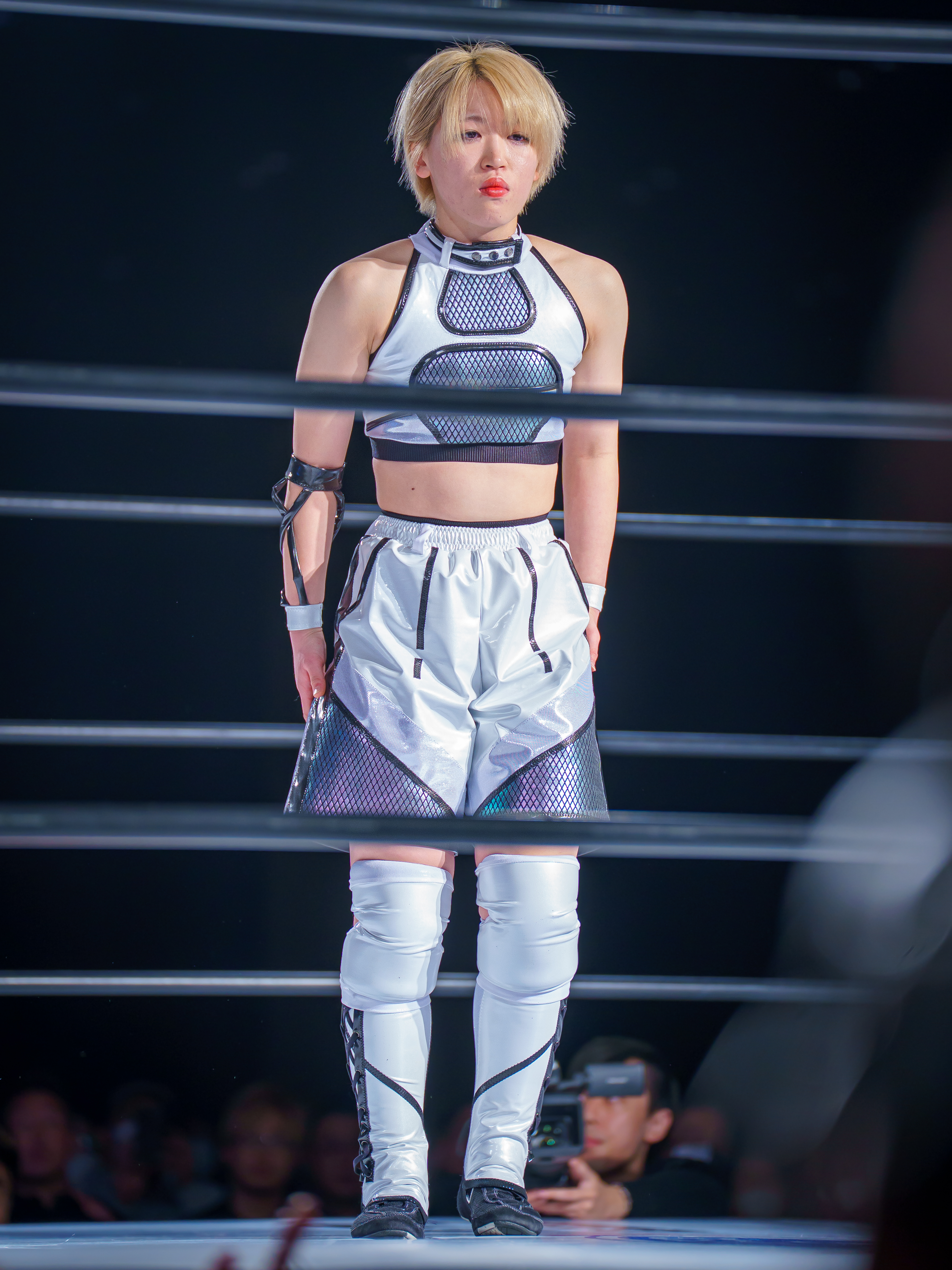
- Kurogane on January 25, 2025, during her debut match

Personal information
- Born: May 18, 2000 (age 26) Kashiwazaki, Niigata, Japan

Professional wrestling career
- Ring name: Akira Kurogane
- Billed height: 157 cm (5 ft 2 in)
- Billed weight: 54 kg (119 lb)
- Trained by: Suzu Suzuki
- Debut: 2025

Akira Kurogane (鉄 アキラ, Kurogane Akira; born May 18, 2000) is Japanese professional wrestler. She works for World Wonder Ring Stardom, where she is a member of Mi Vida Loca.

== Professional wrestling career ==
=== World Wonder Ring Stardom (2025–present) ===
In December 2023, Kurogane joined World Wonder Ring Stardom as a trainee.

Kurogane made her official in-ring debut at Stardom Award 2025 in Takadanobaba on January 25, 2025, where she faced Suzu Suzuki.
