= Stardom Cinderella Tournament 2025 =

2024 World Wonder Ring Stardom event

- Promotional poster of the event featuring various participants
- Promotion: World Wonder Ring Stardom
- Date: March 8–15, 2025
- City: Yokohama, Japan (March 8); Kariya, Japan (March 9); Tokyo, Japan (March 15)
- Venue: Yokohama Budokan (March 8); Kariya City Industrial Promotion Center (March 9); Ota City General Gymnasium (March 15)
- Attendance: Night 1 (1,830); Night 2 (678); Night 3 (1,378)

Event chronology
← Previous; New Blood 19	Next → New Blood 20

Cinderella Tournament chronology
← Previous; 2024	Next → 2026

The 2025 Stardom Cinderella Tournament (スターダムシンデレラトーナメント2025, Sutādamushindereratōnamento 2025) was the eleventh annual professional wrestling single-elimination tournament under the Cinderella Tournament branch of events promoted by World Wonder Ring Stardom. The event took place between March 8 and 15, 2025.

== Storylines ==
The show featured professional wrestling matches with scripted storylines, where wrestlers portray villains, heroes, or less distinguishable characters in the scripted events that built tension and culminate in a wrestling match or series of matches. The matches can be won by pinfall, submission or elimination over the top rope. A time-limit draw or a double elimination means a loss for each competitor.

== Event ==
=== Night 1 (March 8) ===
The first day of the event which took place on March 8, 2025, portraited the first-round tournament matches. All eight of the first round matches were disputed in the first day, where Ranna Yagai picked up a victory over Akira Kurogane, Rina over Yuria Hime, Azusa Inaba over Rian, Consejo Mundial de Lucha Libre (CMLL)'s Tabata over Hina, Sayaka Kurara over Ruaka, Miyu Amasaki over Lady C, and Hanan over Tomoka Inaba, while Hanako time-limit drew against Aya Sakura, granting Azusa Inaba a walkover victory through the semifinals. Four routine matches were also contested into the first day where Lluvia defeated Fukigen Death, Koguma, Mei Seira and Waka Tsukiyama in a five-way bout, Hazuki and Saya Iida defeated the teams of Saori Anou and Yuna Mizumori, and AZM and Suzu Suzuki in three-way tag team competition, Mayu Iwatani and Momo Kohgo outmatched Natsuko Tora and Thekla via disqualification, and Maika and Mina Shirakawa picked up a victory over Starlight Kid and Tam Nakano.

=== Night 2 (March 9) ===
The second day of the event which took place on March 9, 2025, portraited the second-round tournament matches where Rina defeated Tabata, Hanan picked up a victory over Miyu Amasaki and Sayaka Kurara defeated Ranna Yagami. Besides the tournament matches, five other bouts were also contested. Mayu Iwatani, Momo Kohgo and Saya Iida outmatched Aya Sakura, Tam Nakano and Yuna Mizumori in six-woman tag team competition, Azusa Inaba defeated Akira Kurogane, and Hanako defeated Yuria Hime in singles competitions, Hina, Saki Kashima, Syuri and Tomoka Inaba picked up a victory over Maika, Mina Shirakawa, Rian and Waka Tsukiyama in eight-woman tag team action, and AZM, Mei Seira, Starlight Kid and Suzu Suzuki defeated Konami, Natsuko Tora, Ruaka and Saya Kamitani in the main event.

=== Night 3 - Finals (March 15) ===
The third day of the tournament took place on March 15, 2025, and started with two preshow confrontations. In the first one Fukigen Death defeated Rian in singles competition, and in the second one, Maika, Hanako and Waka Tsukiyama picked up a victory over Tabata, Akira Kurogane and Yuria Hime in six-woman tag team competition.

In the first main card bout, Sayaka Kurara defeated Azusa Inaba in the semifinals of the Cinderella Tournament. Next up, Rina outmatched Hanan in the second semifinal. Next up, Saya Kamitani, Natsuko Tora, Momo Watanabe and Ruaka defeated AZM, Suzu Suzuki, Mei Seira and Miyu Amasaki in eight-woman tag team action. The sixth bout saw Syuri, Saki Kashima, Lady C, Tomoka Inaba and Ranna Yagami outmatching Mayu Iwatani, Hazuki, Koguma, Saya Iida and Momo Kohgo in ten-woman tag team competition. After the bout concluded, Syuri challenged Iwatani for the latter's IWGP Women's Championship in a bout set to take place at All Star Grand Queendom on April 27, 2025. Next up, Tam Nakano and Saori Anou defeated Yuna Mizumori and Aya Sakura in tag team competition. After the bout concluded, Unagi Sayaka showed up to invite Anou to tag up with her in a match hosted in the independent scene. The eighth bout saw Thekla defeat Mina Shirakawa in singles competition. In the semi main event, Sayaka Kurara defeated Rina in the finals of the Cinderella Tournament.

In the main event, Starlight Kid defeated Konami to secure the second consecutive defense of the Wonder of Stardom Championship in that respective reign.

No.	Results	Stipulations	Times
1^{P}	Fukigen Death defeated Rian	Singles match	4:38
2^{P}	Empress Nexus Venus (Maika, Hanako and Waka Tsukiyama) defeated Tabata, Akira Kurogane and Yuria Hime	Six-woman tag team match	8:32
3	Sayaka Kurara defeated Azusa Inaba	Cinderella tournament semifinals match	13:13
4	Rina defeated Hanan	Cinderella tournament semifinals match	14:15
5	H.A.T.E. (Saya Kamitani, Natsuko Tora, Momo Watanabe and Ruaka) defeated Neo Genesis (AZM, Suzu Suzuki, Mei Seira and Miyu Amasaki)	Eight-woman tag team match	9:47
6	God's Eye (Syuri, Saki Kashima, Lady C, Tomoka Inaba and Ranna Yagami) defeated Stars (Mayu Iwatani, Hazuki, Koguma, Saya Iida and Momo Kohgo)	Ten-woman tag team match	11:18
7	Cosmic Angels (Tam Nakano and Saori Anou) defeated Sakuradamon (Yuna Mizumori and Aya Sakura)	Tag team match	14:23
8	Thekla defeated Mina Shirakawa	Singles match	16:07
9	Sayaka Kurara defeated Rina	Cinderella tournament finals	15:08
10	Starlight Kid (c) defeated Konami	Singles match for the Wonder of Stardom Championship	16:53
(c) / – the champion(s) heading into the match; P / – the match was broadcast on the pre-show

== Participants ==
The tournament consisted of 16 participants, including several champions.

*Noted underneath are the champions who held their titles at the time of the tournament.

Wrestler	Unit	Notes
Akira Kurogane	Unaffiliated	
Aya Sakura	Cosmic Angels	
Azusa Inaba	H.A.T.E.	Freelancer (Just Tap Out)
Hanako	Empress Nexus Venus	New Blood Tag Team Champion
Hanan	Stars	Goddesses of Stardom Champion
Hina	God's Eye	Future of Stardom Champion
Lady C	God's Eye	
Miyu Amasaki	Neo Genesis	Artist of Stardom Champion
Ranna Yagami	God's Eye	
Rian	Empress Nexus Venus	
Rina	H.A.T.E.	
Ruaka	H.A.T.E.	
Sayaka Kurara	Cosmic Angels	Winner
Tabata	Unaffiliated	Consejo Mundial de Lucha Libre
Tomoka Inaba	God's Eye	Freelancer (Just Tap Out)
Yuria Hime	Unaffiliated	

== Brackets ==
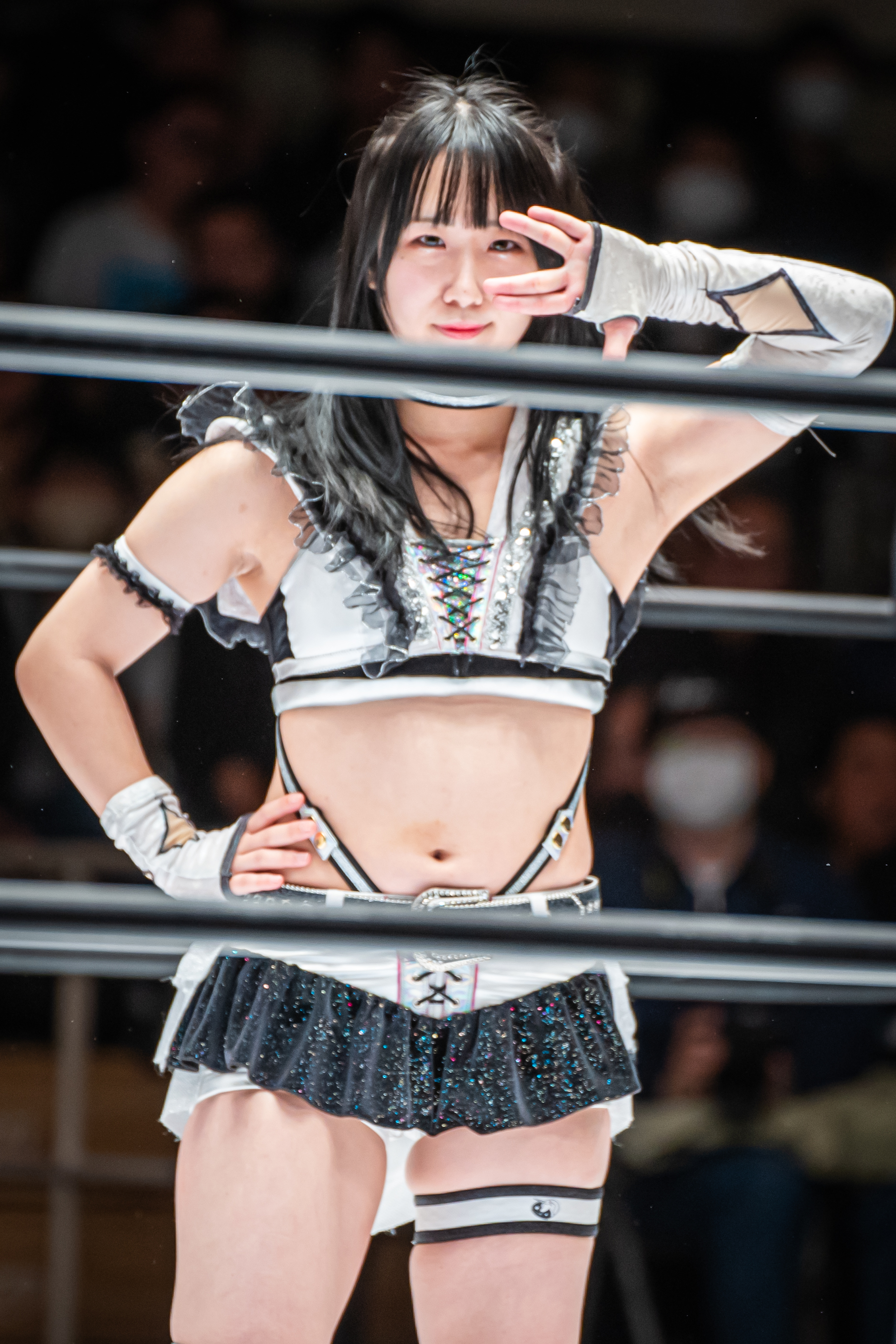
Winner of the 2025 Cinderella Tournament, Sayaka Kurara.

Round 1 March 8
Sayaka Kurara	Elim
Ruaka	7:31
Akira Kurogane	6:50
Ranna Yagami	Pin
Aya Sakura	15:00
Hanako	Draw
Azusa Inaba	Sub
Rian	8:03
Hanan	Pin
Tomoka Inaba	10:19
Miyu Amasaki	Pin
Lady C	2:34
Rina	Pin
Yuria Hime	8:11
Hina	5:56
Tabata	Pin

Quarterfinals; March 9
Sayaka Kurara	Pin
Ranna Yagami	11:44
Bye
Azusa Inaba	N/A
Hanan	Pin
Miyu Amasaki	7:19
Rina	Pin
Tabata	7:40

Semifinals; March 15
Sayaka Kurara	Pin
Azusa Inaba	13:13
Hanan	14:15
Rina	Pin

Final; March 15
Sayaka Kurara	Pin
Rina	15:08
