= Stardom Cinderella Tournament 2026 =

2026 World Wonder Ring Stardom event

- Promotional poster of the event featuring Sayaka Kurara
- Promotion: World Wonder Ring Stardom
- Date: March 6–15, 2026
- City: Nagoya, Japan (March 6, 7); Tokyo, Japan (March 11); Yokohama, Japan (March 15)
- Venue: Aichi Chunichi Hall (March 6, 7); Korakuen Hall (March 11); Yokohama Budokan (March 15)
- Attendance: Night 1 (560); Night 2 (560); Night 3 (1,097); Night 4 (1,164); Night 5 (1,857)

Event chronology
← Previous; Supreme Fight	Next → New Blood 30

Cinderella Tournament chronology
← Previous; 2025	Next → —

Stardom Cinderella Tournament 2026
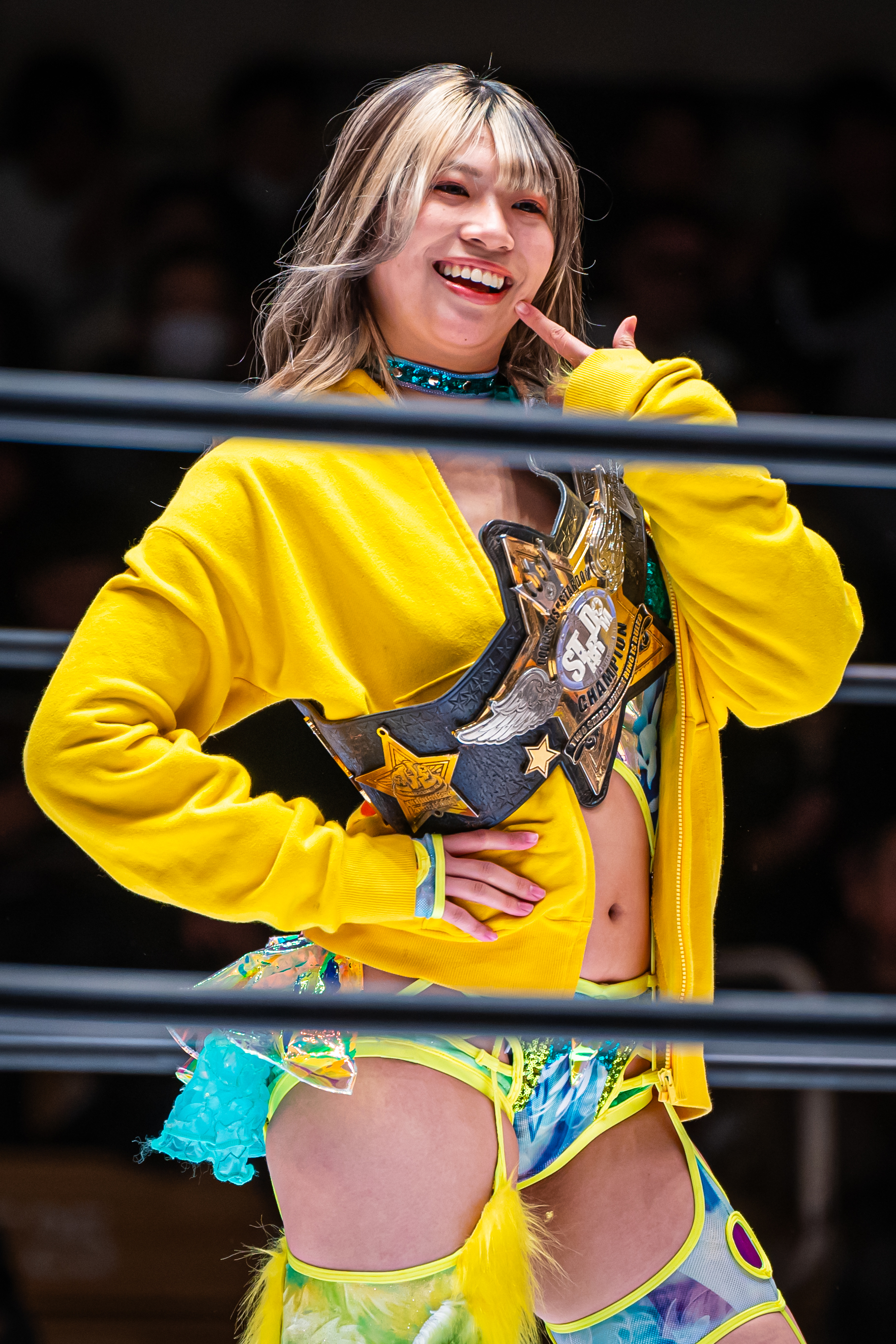
- Hanan, winner of the 2026 Cinderella Tournament

Tournament information
- Sport: Professional wrestling
- Location: Japan
- Dates: March 6, 2026–March 15, 2026
- Tournament format: Round-robin tournament
- Participants: 32

Final positions
- Champion: Hanan
- Runner-up: Rina

Tournament statistics
- Bouts fought: 29

The 2026 Stardom Cinderella Tournament (スターダムシンデレラトーナメント2026, Sutādamushindereratōnamento 2026) was the twelfth annual professional wrestling single-elimination tournament under the Cinderella Tournament branch of events promoted by World Wonder Ring Stardom. The event took place between March 6 and 15, 2026.

== Storylines ==
The show featured professional wrestling matches with scripted storylines, where wrestlers portray villains, heroes, or less distinguishable characters in the scripted events that built tension and culminate in a wrestling match or series of matches. The matches can be won by pinfall, submission or elimination over the top rope. A time-limit draw or a double elimination means a loss for each competitor.

== Participants ==
The tournament consisted of 32 participants, including several champions and it was the largest to its date.

*Noted underneath are the champions who held their titles at the time of the tournament.

Wrestler	Unit	Notes
Akira Kurogane	Mi Vida Loca	
Anne Kanaya	Unaffiliated	
Ami Sourei	God's Eye	
Aya Sakura	Cosmic Angels	New Blood Tag Team Champion
Azusa Inaba	H.A.T.E.	Freelancer (Just Tap Out)
Bea Priestley	Stars	
Fukigen Death	H.A.T.E.	Artist of Stardom Champion
Fuwa-chan	Unaffiliated	
Hanako	Unaffiliated	Future of Stardom Champion
Hanan	Stars	Winner
Hina	God's Eye	
Kikyo Furusawa	Unaffiliated	
Kiyoka Kotatsu	God's Eye	
Lady C	God's Eye	
Maki Itoh	Unaffiliated	
Miyu Amasaki	Neo Genesis	
Momo Kohgo	Stars	
Natsupoi	Cosmic Angels	
Ranna Yagami	God's Eye	
Rian	Unaffiliated	
Rina	H.A.T.E.	Artist of Stardom Champion
Rina Yamashita	Mi Vida Loca	
Saki Kashima	God's Eye	
Saori Anou	Cosmic Angels	
Saya Iida	Stars	
Sayaka Kurara	Cosmic Angels	New Blood Tag Team Champion
Tabata	Unaffiliated	Consejo Mundial de Lucha Libre
Tomoka Inaba	God's Eye	Freelancer (Just Tap Out)
Waka Tsukiyama	Unaffiliated	
Xena	Unaffiliated	
Yuna Mizumori	Cosmic Angels	High Speed Champion
Yuria Hime	Stars	

== Brackets ==
Round 1 March 6, 7
Hanan	Pin
Momo Kohgo	11:37
Waka Tsukiyama	7:15
Ranna Yagami	Pin
Maki Itoh	Pin
Kikyo Furusawa	13:07
Saori Anou	Draw
Fuwa-chan	10:56
Aya Sakura	Pin
Fukigen Death	4:47
Hanako	Draw
Yuria Hime	9:59
Yuna Mizumori	7:44
Rian	Pin
Natsupoi	Pin
Tabata	8:45
Saki Kashima	6:46
Sayaka Kurara	Pin
Tomoka Inaba	Sub
Anne Kanaya	7:12
Akira Kurogane	12:37
Rina	Pin
Bea Priestley	11:28
Ami Sohrei	Pin
Hina	Pin
Xena	10:32
Lady C	8:07
Azusa Inaba	Pin
Miyu Amasaki	Elim
Rina Yamashita	6:40
Saya Iida	Sub
Kiyoka Kotatsu	7:25

Round 2 March 8
Hanan	Pin
Ranna Yagami	7:43
Maki Itoh
Bye	N/A
Aya Sakura
Bye	N/A
Rian	Elim
Natsupoi	10:40
Sayaka Kurara	Pin
Tomoka Inaba	12:44
Rina	Pin
Ami Sohrei	13:10
Hina	Pin
Azusa Inaba	12:51
Miyu Amasaki	Pin
Saya Iida	9:52

Quarterfinals; March 11
Hanan	11:12
Maki Itoh	Pin
Aya Sakura	Pin
Rian	13:17
Sayaka Kurara	15:14
Rina	Pin
Hina	Pin
Miyu Amasaki	14:39

Semifinals; March 15
Hanan	Pin
Aya Sakura	11:42
Rina	Sub
Miyu Amasaki	13:53

Final; March 15
Hanan	Pin
Rina	20:00

== Results ==
=== Day 1 ===
The first day took place on March 6, 2026, at Chunichi Hall in Nagoya, Aichi.

No.	Results	Stipulations	Times
1	Rian defeated Yuna Mizumori by pinfall	Cinderella Tournament first round match	7:44
2	Aya Sakura defeated Fukigen Death by pinfall	Cinderella Tournament first round match	4:47
3	Ranna Yagami defeated Waka Tsukiyama by pinfall	Cinderella Tournament first round match	7:15
4	Natsupoi defeated Tabata by pinfall	Cinderella Tournament first round match	8:45
5	Hanako vs. Yuria Hime ended in a double countout	Cinderella Tournament first round match	9:59
6	Maki Itoh defeated Kikyo Furusawa by submission	Cinderella Tournament first round match	13:07
7	Saori Anou vs. Fuwa-chan ended in a double over the top rope elimination	Cinderella Tournament first round match	10:56
8	Hanan defeated Momo Kohgo	Cinderella Tournament first round match	11:37

=== Day 2 ===
The second day took place on March 7, 2026, at Nagoya Congress Center in Nagoya, Aichi.

No.	Results	Stipulations	Times
1	Tomoka Inaba defeated Anne Kanaya by submission	Cinderella Tournament first round match	7:12
2	Azusa Inaba defeated Lady C by pinfall	Cinderella Tournament first round match	8:07
3	Saya Iida defeated Kiyoka Kotatsu by submission	Cinderella Tournament first round match	7:25
4	Hina defeated Xena by pinfall	Cinderella Tournament first round match	10:32
5	Miyu Amasaki defeated Rina Yamashita via over the top rope elimination	Cinderella Tournament first round match	6:40
6	Sayaka Kurara defeated Saki Kashima by pinfall	Cinderella Tournament first round match	6:46
7	Rina defeated Akira Kurogane by pinfall	Cinderella Tournament first round match	12:37
8	Ami Sohrei defeated Bea Priestley by pinfall	Cinderella Tournament first round match	11:28

=== Day 3 ===
The third day took place on March 8, 2026, at Korakuen Hall in Tokyo, Japan.

No.	Results	Stipulations	Times
1	India Sioux, Tabata, and Stars (Bea Priestley, Momo Kohgo, and Yuria Hime) defeated Hanako, Hazuki, Xena, and Mi Vida Loca (Bozilla and Akira Kurogane) by pinfall	Ten-woman tag team match	6:40
2	Cosmic Angels (Saori Anou, Yuna Mizumori, and Aya Sakura) defeated Maki Itoh, Fuwa-chan and Kikyo Furusawa, and Anne Kanaya and God's Eye (Saki Kashima and Lady C)	Three-way tag team match	6:55
3	Hanan defeated Ranna Yagami by pinfall	Cinderella Tournament second round match	7:43
4	Rian defeated Natsupoi via over the top rope elimination	Cinderella Tournament second round match	10:40
5	Hina defeated Azusa Inaba by pinfall	Cinderella Tournament second round match	12:51
6	Sayaka Kurara defeated Tomoka Inaba by pinfall	Cinderella Tournament second round match	12:44
7	Rina defeated Ami Sohrei by pinfall	Cinderella Tournament second round match	13:10
8	Miyu Amasaki defeated Saya Iida by pinfall	Cinderella Tournament second round match	9:52

=== Day 4 ===
The fourth day took place on March 11, 2026, at Korakuen Hall in Tokyo, Japan.

No.	Results	Stipulations	Times
1	Maika, Xena, India Sioux, Tabata, and Neo Genesis (Starlight Kid and Mei Seira) defeated Hazuki, Fuwa-chan, Kikyo Furusawa, Anne Kanaya, and Cosmic Angels (Saori Anou and Yuna Mizumori) by pinfall	Twelve-woman tag team match	7:56
2	Mi Vida Loca (Suzu Suzuki, Rina Yamashita, and Itsuki Aoki) defeated Stars (Bea Priestley, Saya Iida, and Momo Kohgo) by pinfall	Six-woman tag team match	8:38
3	God's Eye (Ami Sohrei, Saki Kashima, Lady C, Tomoka Inaba, and Ranna Yagami) defeated H.A.T.E. (Natsuko Tora, Konami, Ruaka, Azusa Inaba, and Fukigen Death)	Ten-woman tag team match	8:14
4	Hanan defeated Maki Itoh by pinfall	Cinderella Tournament quarterfinals match	11:22
5	Aya Sakura defeated Rian by pinfall	Cinderella Tournament quarterfinals match	13:17
6	Hanako (c) defeated Yuria Hime by pinfall	Singles match for the Future of Stardom Championship	12:03
7	Rina defeated Sayaka Kurara by pinfall	Cinderella Tournament quarterfinals match	15:14
8	Miyu Amasaki defeated Hina by pinfall	Cinderella Tournament quarterfinals match	14:39
(c) / – the champion(s) heading into the match

=== Day 5 ===
The fifth and final day took place on March 15, 2026, at Yokohama Budokan in Yokohama, Japan.

No.	Results	Stipulations	Times
1	Hanan defeated Aya Sakura by pinfall	Cinderella Tournament semifinals match	11:42
2	Rina defeated Miyu Amasaki by submission	Cinderella Tournament semifinals match	13:53
3	God's Eye (Syuri and Saki Kashima) and Mi Vida Loca (Rina Yamashita and Itsuki Aoki) defeated Maki Itoh, Rian, Kikyo Furusawa and Kiyoka Kotatsu by pinfall	Eight-woman tag team match	5:31
4	Fuwa-chan and Stars (Bea Priestley, Saya Iida, Momo Kohgo, Yuria Hime) defeated Maika, Xena, Anne Kanaya, and Cosmic Angels (Saori Anou and Yuna Mizumori by pinfall	Ten-woman tag team match	10:27
5	Spark Rush (Sareee and Takumi Iroha) defeated Mi Vida Loca (Suzu Suzuki and Akira Kurogane) by pinfall	Tag team match	10:43
6	Ranna Yagami defeated Hanako (c) by pinfall	Singles match for the Future of Stardom Championship	11:49
7	Tabata and Neo Genesis (Starlight Kid, AZM, and Mei Seira) defeated H.A.T.E. (Natsuko Tora, Ruaka, Azusa Inaba, and Fukigen Death), and God's Eye (Ami Sohrei, Hina, Lady C and Tomoka Inaba) by pinfall	Three-way eight-woman tag team match	5:59
8	India Sioux defeated Hazuki (c) by pinfall	Singles match for the CMLL Japanese Women's Championship	15:16
9	Hanan defeated Rina by pinfall	Cinderella Tournament finals match	22:00
10	Cosmic Angels (Natsupoi and Sayaka Kurara) defeated H.A.T.E. (Saya Kamitani and Konami) by pinfall	Tag team match	12:52
(c) / – the champion(s) heading into the match
