= Stardom New Blood 29 =

2025 World Wonder Ring Stardom event

New Blood 29
- Promotional artwork of the event
- Promotion: World Wonder Ring Stardom
- Date: February 4, 2026
- City: Tokyo, Japan
- Venue: Tokyo Square
- Attendance: 153

Event chronology
← Previous; New Year Dream	Next → Supreme Fight

New Blood chronology
← Previous; New Blood 28	Next → New Blood 30

Stardom New Blood 29 (スターダム ニュー ブラッド 29, Sutādamu nyū Buraddo 29) was a professional wrestling event promoted by World Wonder Ring Stardom. The event took place on February 4, 2026, in Tokyo, Japan at the Tokyo Square.

== Production ==
=== Background ===
"New Blood" is a series of events that mainly focus on matches where rookie wrestlers, usually with three or fewer years of in-ring experience, evolve. Besides wrestlers from Stardom, various superstars from multiple promotions of the Japanese independent scene are invited to compete in bouts that are usually going under the stipulation of singles or tag team matches.

=== Event ===
The event started with the non-title tag team confrontation between Mase Hiiro and Moe Hiiro, and New Blood Tag Team Champions Aya Sakura and Sayaka Kurara, solded with the victory of the latters. Next up, Hina and Kiyoka Kotatsu picked up a victory over Kikyo Furusawa and Azusa Inaba in tag team competition. The third bout saw Xena defeat Rian in singles competition. In the fourth bout, Ranna Yagami, Tomoka Inaba and Nanami Hatano outmatched Yuria Hime, Anne Kanaya and Miran in six-woman tag team competition.

In the main event, Future of Stardom Champion Hanako defeated Akira Kurogane in a non-title singles bout.

== Results ==
No.	Results	Stipulations	Times
1	Sakurara (Aya Sakura and Sayaka Kurara) defeated Mase Hiiro and Moe Hiiro by pinfall	Tag team match	14:07
2	God's Eye (Hina and Kiyoka Kotatsu) defeated Kikyo Furusawa and Azusa Inaba by pinfall	Tag team match	10:11
3	Xena defeated Rian by pinfall	Singles match	11:54
4	God's Eye (Ranna Yagami, Tomoka Inaba and Nanami Hatano) defeated Yuria Hime, Anne Kanaya and Miran by pinfall	Six-woman tag team match	13:38
5	Hanako defeated Akira Kurogane by pinfall	Singles match	13:17
