= Stardom Dream Queendom 2025 =

2025 World Wonder Ring Stardom event

- Promotional poster featuring Saya Kamitani
- Promotion: World Wonder Ring Stardom
- Date: December 29, 2025
- City: Tokyo, Japan
- Venue: Ryōgoku Kokugikan
- Attendance: 6,563

Event chronology
← Previous; New Blood 27	Next → New Year Dream

Dream Queendom chronology
← Previous; 2024	Next → 2026

Stardom Dream Queendom 2025 (スターダム ドリームクイーンダム 2025, Sutādamu dorīmukuīndamu 2025) was a professional wrestling event promoted by World Wonder Ring Stardom. It was the fourth annual Stardom Dream Queendom and took place on December 29, 2025, in Tokyo, Japan, at the Ryōgoku Kokugikan.

Nine matches were contested at the event, including two on the pre-show. In the main event, Saya Kamitani defeated Saori Anou to retain the World of Stardom Championship. In other prominent matches, Konami defeated Saya Iida to retain the Wonder of Stardom Championship, BMI2000 (Natsuko Tora and Ruaka) defeated 2025 Goddesses of Stardom Tag League winners Sakurara (Aya Sakura and Sayaka Kurara) to retain the Goddesses of Stardom Championship, Sareee defeated Natsupoi, and Hazuki defeated Fuwa-chan.

== Production ==
=== Background ===
Stardom Dream Queendom is an annual professional wrestling event promoted by the Japanese professional wrestling promotion World Wonder Ring Stardom. Since its inception in 2021, it has taken place on December 29, at Ryōgoku Kokugikan in Tokyo, Japan and marks last pay-per-view of the year hosted by the promotion. The inaugural Dream Queendom took place in 2021. The second event took place in 2022, thus establishing Stardom Dream Queendom as an annual event.

=== Storylines ===
The show featured several professional wrestling matches that result from scripted storylines, where wrestlers portray villains, heroes, or less distinguishable characters in the scripted events that build tension and culminate in a wrestling match or series of matches.

=== Event ===
The event featured two preshow bouts. In the first one, Ema Maishima and Kikyo Furusawa picked up a victory over Matoi Hamabe and Anne Kanaya in tag team competition. In the second one, Starlight Kid and AZM outmatched Syuri and Tomoka Inaba in another tag team competition bout.

In the first main card match, Rina won the Year-End Stardom Rumble by last eliminating Miyu Amasaki. The bout saw a brief return of legend Yuzuki Aikawa and the participation of Consejo Mundial de Lucha Libre's Olympia.

Next up, Megan Bayne,Maika, Xena, and Hanako fought Suzu Suzuki, Bozilla, Rina Yamashita, and Itsuki Aoki into a draw in eight-woman tag team competition. The fifth bout saw the official in-ring debut of Fuwa-chan who fell short to Hazuki in singles competition. Next up, Sareee picked up a victory over Natsupoi in singles competition. In the seventh match, Natsuko Tora and Ruaka defeated 2025 Goddesses of Stardom Tag League winners Aya Sakura and Sayaka Kurara to retain the Goddess of Stardom Championship, securing the third consecutive defense of the titles in that respective reign. In the semi main event, Konami defeated Saya Iida to secure the first successful defense of the Wonder of Stardom Championship in that respective reign. After the bout concluded, Konami was challenged by Rina.

In the main event, Saya Kamitani defeated Saori Anou to secure the eighth consecutive defense of the World of Stardom Championship in that respective reign.

== Results ==
No.	Results	Stipulations	Times
1^{P}	Ema Maishima and Kikyo Furusawa defeated Matoi Hamabe and Anne Kanaya by submission	Tag team match	10:46
2	Star Bomb (Starlight Kid and AZM) defeated Karate Brave (Syuri and Tomoka Inaba) by pinfall	Tag team match	12:29
3	Rina won by last eliminating Miyu Amasaki (Note: The other competitors in order of elimination: Rian, Akira Kurogane, Azusa Inaba, Koguma, Ranna Yagami, Kiyoka Kotatsu, Momo Kohgo, Yuna Mizumori, Mei Seira, Fukigen Death, Waka Tsukiyama, Ami Sohrei, Olympia, Lady C, Saki Kashima, Bea Priestley, Yuria Hime, Yuzuki Aikawa, and Hina.)	Year-End Stardom Rumble	36:45
4	Megan Bayne and Empress Nexus Venus (Maika, Xena, and Hanako) vs. Mi Vida Loca (Suzu Suzuki, Bozilla, Rina Yamashita, and Itsuki Aoki) ended in a double countout	Eight-man tag team match	16:27
5	Hazuki defeated Fuwa-chan by pinfall	Singles match This was Fuwa-chan's official debut match.	11:33
6	Sareee defeated Natsupoi by pinfall	Singles match	18:20
7	BMI2000 (Natsuko Tora and Ruaka) (c) defeated Sakurara (Aya Sakura and Sayaka Kurara) by pinfall	Tag team match for the Goddess of Stardom Championship	19:58
8	Konami (c) defeated Saya Iida by pinfall	Singles match for the Wonder of Stardom Championship	20:34
9	Saya Kamitani (c) defeated Saori Anou by pinfall	Singles match for the World of Stardom Championship	22:40
(c) / – the champion(s) heading into the match; P / – the match was broadcast on the pre-show
