= Stardom New Blood 20 =

2025 World Wonder Ring Stardom event

New Blood 20
- Promotional artwork of the event
- Promotion: World Wonder Ring Stardom
- Date: March 27, 2025
- City: Tokyo, Japan
- Venue: Shinagawa Intercity Hall
- Attendance: 296

Event chronology
| ← Previous; Cinderella Tournament | Next → American Dream |

New Blood chronology
| ← Previous; New Blood 19 | Next → New Blood 21 |

Stardom New Blood 20 (スターダム ニュー ブラッド 20, Sutādamu nyū Buraddo 20) was a professional wrestling event promoted by World Wonder Ring Stardom. The event took place on March 27, 2025, in Tokyo, Japan, at the Shinagawa Intercity Hall.

Seven matches were contested at the event. The main event saw Rice or Bread (Waka Tsukiyama and Hanako) defeat Sakuradamon (Aya Sakura and Yuna Mizumori) to retain the New Blood Tag Team Championship.

== Production ==
=== Background ===
"New Blood" is a series of events that mainly focus on matches where rookie wrestlers, usually with three or fewer years of in-ring experience, evolve. Besides wrestlers from Stardom, various superstars from multiple promotions of the Japanese independent scene are invited to compete in bouts that are usually going under the stipulation of singles or tag team matches.

The show featured professional wrestling matches that result from scripted storylines, where wrestlers portray villains, heroes, or less distinguishable characters in the scripted events that build tension and culminate in a wrestling match or series of matches.

=== Event ===
The entire event was broadcast live on Stardom's YouTube channel. It started with the singles confrontation between Anne Kanaya and Rina, solded with the victory of the latter. Next up, Tomoka Inaba and Akira Kurogane picked up a victory over Sayaka Kurara and Yuria Hime in tag team competition. The third bout saw Goddesses of Stardom Champions Hanan and Saya Iida outmatch Kaori Yoneyama and Rian. In the fourth bout, Tae Honma and Kakeru Sekiguchi defeated Future of Stardom Champion Hina and Ranna Yagami in tag team competition. Next up, Saya Kamitani, Ruaka and Azusa Inaba defeated Kohaku, Honoka and Saran in six-woman tag team competition ahead of Kamitani and Honoka's clash for the Wave Single Championship which occurred days after the event. In the semi main event, Tam Nakano defeated Misa Kagura in singles competition.

In the main event, Waka Tsukiyama and Hanako defeated Aya Sakura and Yuna Mizumori to secure the second consecutive defense of the New Blood Tag Team Championship in that respective reign.

== Results ==
| No. | Results | Stipulations | Times |
|---|---|---|---|
| 1 | Rina defeated Anne Kanaya | Singles match | 10:05 |
| 2 | Tomoka Inaba and Akira Kurogane defeated Sayaka Kurara and Yuria Hime | Tag team match | 12:12 |
| 3 | wing★gori (Hanan and Saya Iida) defeated Kaori Yoneyama and Rian | Tag team match | 9:26 |
| 4 | Tae Honma and Kakeru Sekiguchi defeated God's Eye (Hina and Ranna Yagami) | Tag team match | 10:53 |
| 5 | H.A.T.E. (Saya Kamitani, Ruaka and Azusa Inaba) defeated Kohaku, Honoka and Saran | Six-woman tag team match | 12:05 |
| 6 | Tam Nakano defeated Misa Kagura | Singles match | 14:58 |
| 7 | Rice or Bread (Waka Tsukiyama and Hanako) (c) defeated Sakuradamon (Aya Sakura and Yuna Mizumori) | Tag team match for the New Blood Tag Team Championship | 17:43 |
(c) / – the champion(s) heading into the match
