= Stardom New Year Dream 2026 =

2026 World Wonder Ring Stardom event

- Promotional poster of the event
- Promotion: World Wonder Ring Stardom
- Date: January 3, 2026
- City: Tokyo, Japan
- Venue: Shinjuku Face
- Attendance: 478

Event chronology
← Previous; Dream Queendom	Next → New Blood 28

New Year Dream chronology
← Previous; 2025	Next → —

Stardom New Year Dream 2026 (スターダム新年夢2026, Sutādamu shin'nen yume 2026) was a professional wrestling event promoted by World Wonder Ring Stardom. It took place on January 3, 2026, in Tokyo, Japan at the Shinjuku Face. It was the first major event organized by Stardom in 2026.

== Production ==
=== Storylines ===
The show featured thirteen professional wrestling matches that result from scripted storylines, where wrestlers portray villains, heroes, or less distinguishable characters in the scripted events that build tension and culminate in a wrestling match or series of matches.

=== Day show ===
The event was divided in two parts. The day show started with the three-way confrontation won by Consejo Mundial de Lucha Libre's (CMLL) Olympia and also involving Momo Kohgo and Kikyo Furusawa. Next up, Natsuko Tora, Ruaka and Azusa Inaba picked up a victory over Ranna Yagami, Kiyoka Kotatsu and Matoi Hamabe in six-woman tag team competition. The third bout saw Hanako and Rian outmatch Bozilla and Akira Kurogane in tag team competition. In the semi main event, Starlight Kid, Mei Seira and All Elite Wrestling's (AEW) Alex Windsor defeated Natsupoi, Saori Anou and Anne Kanaya in six-woman tag team competition.

In the main event, AZM and Miyu Amasaki defeated Hazuki and Koguma, and Sareee and Miku Kanae in a three-way no. 1 contendership match for the Goddesses of Stardom Championship.

=== Night show ===
The night show started with the singles confrontation between Anne Kanaya and Rina, solded with the victory of the latter. Next up, Saki Kashima picked up a victory over Yuria Hime in singles competition. Next up, Saya Iida and Olympia outmatched Ami Sourei and Matoi Hamabe in tag team competition. The fourth bout saw Alex Windsor and Kikyo Furusawa picking up a victory over Konami and Fukigen Death in tag team competition. In the semi main event, Suzu Suzuki, Rina Yamashita and Itsuki Aoki) outmatched Maika, Xena and Waka Tsukiyama in six-woman tag team competition. In the main event, Hina, Lady C and Tomoka Inaba defeated Yuna Mizumori, Aya Sakura and Sayaka Kurara in tag team competition.

== Results ==
Day Show
No.	Results	Stipulations	Times
1	Olympia defeated Momo Kohgo and Kikyo Furusawa by pinfall	Three-way match	6:59
2	H.A.T.E. (Natsuko Tora, Ruaka and Azusa Inaba) defeated Matoi Hamabe and God's Eye (Ranna Yagami and Kiyoka Kotatsu by pinfall	Six-woman tag team match	7:52
3	Empress Nexus Venus (Hanako and Rian) defeated Mi Vida Loca (Bozilla and Akira Kurogane) by pinfall	Tag team match	15:04
4	Alex Windsor and Neo Genesis (Starlight Kid and Mei Seira) defeated Anne Kanaya and SaoriPoi (Natsupoi and Saori Anou) by pinfall	Six-woman tag team match	14:14
5	02line (AZM and Miyu Amasaki) defeated FWC (Hazuki and Koguma) and T-Hearts (Sareee and Miku Kanae) by pinfall	Three-way tag team match to determine the #1 contender to the Goddesses of Stardom Championship	14:30

Night Show
No.	Results	Stipulations	Times
1	Rina defeated Anne Kanaya by submission	Singles match	9:40
2	Saki Kashima defeated Yuria Hime by pinfall	Singles match	1:32
3	Saya Iida and Olympia defeated Ami Sourei and Matoi Hamabe by pinfall	Tag team match	10:13
4	Alex Windsor and Kikyo Furusawa defeated H.A.T.E. (Konami and Fukigen Death) by pinfall	Tag team match	8:03
5	Mi Vida Loca (Suzu Suzuki, Rina Yamashita and Itsuki Aoki) defeated Empress Nexus Venus (Maika, Xena and Waka Tsukiyama) by pinfall	Six-woman tag team match	13:18
6	God's Eye (Lady C, Tomoka Inaba, and Hina) defeated Cosmic Angels (Yuna Mizumori, Aya Sakura and Sayaka Kurara) by pinfall	Six-woman tag team match	20:15
