= Stardom New Blood 28 =

2025 World Wonder Ring Stardom event

New Blood 28
- Promotional artwork of the event
- Promotion: World Wonder Ring Stardom
- Date: February 3, 2026
- City: Tokyo, Japan
- Venue: Tokyo Square
- Attendance: 153

Event chronology
← Previous; New Year Dream	Next → New Blood 29

New Blood chronology
← Previous; New Blood 27	Next → New Blood 29

Stardom New Blood 28 (スターダム ニュー ブラッド 28, Sutādamu nyū Buraddo 28) was a professional wrestling event promoted by World Wonder Ring Stardom. The event took place on February 3, 2026, in Tokyo, Japan at the Tokyo Square.

== Production ==
=== Background ===
"New Blood" is a series of events that mainly focus on matches where rookie wrestlers, usually with three or fewer years of in-ring experience, evolve. Besides wrestlers from Stardom, various superstars from multiple promotions of the Japanese independent scene are invited to compete in bouts that are usually going under the stipulation of singles or tag team matches.

=== Event ===
The event started with the singles confrontation between Kikyo Furusawa and Hina, solded with the victory of the latter. Next up, Azusa Inaba picked up a victory over Yuria Hime and Kiyoka Kotatsu in three-way tag team competition. The third bout saw Ranna Yagami and Tomoka Inaba outmatch Mase Hiiro and Moe Hiiro in tag team competition. Next up, Hanako and Rian wrestled Nanami Hatano and Miran into a time-limit draw as a result of a tag team bout. In the semi main event, Xena defeated Akira Kurogane in singles competition.

In the main event, Aya Sakura and Sayaka Kurara defeated Yuna Mizumori and Anne Kanaya to secure the first successful defense of the New Blood Tag Team Championship in that respective reign.

== Results ==
No.	Results	Stipulations	Times
1	Hina defeated Kikyo Furusawa by pinfall	Singles match	10:59
2	Azusa Inaba defeated Yuria Hime and Kiyoka Kotatsu by pinfall	Three-way match	5:50
3	God's Eye (Ranna Yagami and Tomoka Inaba) defeated Mase Hiiro and Moe Hiiro by pinfall	Tag team match	14:28
4	Empress Nexus Venus (Hanako and Rian) vs. Nanami Hatano and Miran ended in a time-limit draw	Tag team match	15:00
5	Xena defeated Akira Kurogane by pinfall	Singles match	8:01
6	Sakurara (Aya Sakura and Sayaka Kurara) (c) defeated Yuna Mizumori and Anne Kanaya by pinfall	Tag team match for the New Blood Tag Team Championship	15:28
(c) / – the champion(s) heading into the match
