= Stardom New Blood 27 =

2025 World Wonder Ring Stardom event

New Blood 27
- Promotional artwork of the event
- Promotion: World Wonder Ring Stardom
- Date: December 25, 2025
- City: Tokyo, Japan
- Venue: Bellesalle Shibuya First
- Attendance: 254

Event chronology
← Previous; Crimson Nightmare	Next → Dream Queendom 2025

New Blood chronology
← Previous; New Blood 26	Next → New Blood 28

Stardom New Blood 27 (スターダム ニュー ブラッド 27, Sutādamu nyū Buraddo 27) was a professional wrestling event promoted by World Wonder Ring Stardom. The event took place on December 25, 2025, in Tokyo, Japan at the Bellesalle Shibuya First.

== Production ==
=== Background ===
"New Blood" is a series of events that mainly focus on matches where rookie wrestlers, usually with three or fewer years of in-ring experience, evolve. Besides wrestlers from Stardom, various superstars from multiple promotions of the Japanese independent scene are invited to compete in bouts that are usually going under the stipulation of singles or tag team matches.

=== Event ===
The event started with the tag team confrontation between Saran and Anne Kanaya, and Azusa Inaba and Fukigen Death, solded with the victory of the latters. Next up, Tomoka Inaba picked up a victory over Ema Maishima in singles competition. The third bout saw Bea Priestley and Yuria Hime outmatching Itsuki Aoki and Akira Kurogane in tag team competition. Next up, Hina defeated Yuki Mashiro in singles competition. In the semi main event, Aya Sakura, Sayaka Kurara and Yuna Mizumori picked up a victory over Ranna Yagami, Kiyoka Kotatsu and Kikyo Furusawa in sx-woman tag team competition.

In the main event, Hanako defeated Rian to secure the second consecutive defense of the Future of Stardom Championship in that respective reign.

== Results ==
No.	Results	Stipulations	Times
1	H.A.T.E. (Azusa Inaba and Fukigen Death) defeated Saran and Anne Kanaya by pinfall	Tag team match	10:38
2	Tomoka Inaba defeated Ema Maishima by submission	Singles match	7:45
3	Stars (Bea Priestley and Yuria Hime) defeated Mi Vida Loca (Itsuki Aoki and Akira Kurogane) by pinfall	Tag team match	10:52
4	Hina defeated Yuki Mashiro by pinfall	Singles match	9:55
5	Cosmic Angels (Aya Sakura, Sayaka Kurara and Yuna Mizumori) defeated God's Eye (Ranna Yagami, Kiyoka Kotatsu) and Kikyo Furusawa by pinfall	Six-woman tag team match	14:04
6	Hanako (c) defeated Rian by pinfall	Singles match for the Future of Stardom Championship	12:36
(c) / – the champion(s) heading into the match
