= Stardom New Blood 30 =

2025 World Wonder Ring Stardom event

New Blood 30
- Promotional artwork of the event
- Promotion: World Wonder Ring Stardom
- Date: March 25, 2026
- City: Tokyo, Japan
- Venue: Shin-Kiba 1st Ring
- Attendance: 284

Event chronology
← Previous; Cinderella Tournament 2026	Next → American Dream

New Blood chronology
← Previous; New Blood 29	Next → —

Stardom New Blood 30 (スターダム ニュー ブラッド 30, Sutādamu nyū Buraddo 30) was a professional wrestling event promoted by World Wonder Ring Stardom. The event took place on March 25, 2026, in Tokyo, Japan at the Shin-Kiba 1st Ring.

== Production ==
=== Background ===
"New Blood" is a series of events that mainly focus on matches where rookie wrestlers, usually with three or fewer years of in-ring experience, evolve. Besides wrestlers from Stardom, various superstars from multiple promotions of the Japanese independent scene are invited to compete in bouts that are usually going under the stipulation of singles or tag team matches.

=== Event ===
The event started with the six-woman tag team bout in which the team of Hanan, Saya Iida and Yuria Hime picked up a victory over the team of Matoi Hamabe, Anne Kanaya and Ema Maishima. Next up, Yuna Mizumori and Rian outmatched Mase Hiiro and Moe Hiiro in tag team competition. In the third bout, Hanako and Echika Miyabi defeated Hina and Kiyoka Kotatsu in tag team competition. In the semi main event, Saki Kashima and Fukigen Death outmatched Akira Kurogane and Kikyo Furusawa in tag team competition.

In the main event, Ranna Yagami defeated Aya Sakura to secure the first successful defense of the Future of Stardom Championship in that respective reign.

== Results ==
No.	Results	Stipulations	Times
1	Stars (Hanan, Saya Iida and Yuria Hime) defeated Matoi Hamabe, Anne Kanaya and Ema Maishima	Six-woman tag team match	9:57
2	Yuna Mizumori and Rian defeated Mase Hiiro and Moe Hiiro	Tag team match	12:44
3	Hanako and Echika Miyabi defeated God's Eye (Hina and Kiyoka Kotatsu)	Tag team match	13:05
4	Saki Kashima and Fukigen Death defeated Akira Kurogane and Kikyo Furusawa	Tag team match	6:34
5	Ranna Yagami (c) defeated Aya Sakura	Singles match for the Future of Stardom Championship	14:41
(c) / – the champion(s) heading into the match
