= Stardom New Blood =

New Blood
- Promotions: World Wonder Ring Stardom
- First event: New Blood 1

Stardom New Blood (スターダムニューブラッド, Sutādamunyūburaddo) is a series of professional wrestling events promoted by the Japanese professional wrestling promotion World Wonder Ring Stardom. They have been held since 2022 and slowly became a developmental sub-brand of the promotion, which mainly focus on matches where rookie wrestlers, usually with three or less years of in-ring experience, evolve.

Besides native wrestlers from Stardom, various talent from multiple promotions of the Japanese independent scene are invited to compete in bouts that are usually going under the stipulation of singles or tag team matches.

== Past events ==
#	Event	Date	City	Venue	Attendance	Main event	Ref
1	New Blood 1	March 11, 2022	Tokyo, Japan	Shinagawa Intercity Hall	416	Utami Hayashishita vs. Miyu Amasaki	
2	New Blood 2	May 13, 2022	Tokyo, Japan	Tokyo New Pier Hall	338	Cosmic Angels (Mina Shirakawa, Unagi Sayaka) and Haruka Umesaki vs. Oedo Tai (Starlight Kid, Ruaka and Rina)	
3	New Blood 3	July 8, 2022	Tokyo, Japan	Shinagawa Intercity Hall	419	Giulia vs. Miyu Amasaki	
4	New Blood 4	August 26, 2022	Tokyo, Japan	Shinagawa Intercity Hall	400	Miyu Amasaki vs. Tam Nakano	
5	New Blood 5	October 19, 2022	Tokyo, Japan	Shinjuku Sumitomo Hall	418	Hanan (c) vs. Ami Sourei for the Future of Stardom Championship	
6	New Blood 6	December 16, 2022	Tokyo, Japan	Shinjuku Sumitomo Hall	306	Ami Sourei (c) vs. Ruaka for the Future of Stardom Championship	
7	New Blood 7	January 20, 2023	Tokyo, Japan	Belle Salle Takadanobaba	307	God's Eye (Mirai and Tomoka Inaba) vs. wing★gori (Saya Iida and Hanan) in a New Blood Tag Team Championship tournament quarterfinals match	
8	New Blood Premium	March 25, 2023	Yokohama, Japan	Yokohama Budokan	734	Cosmic Angels (Tam Nakano and Waka Tsukiyama) vs. Nanae Takahashi and Kairi	
9	New Blood 8	May 12, 2023	Tokyo, Japan	Shinagawa Intercity Hall	407	Tam Nakano vs. Tam Nakano	
10	New Blood 9	June 2, 2023	Tokyo, Japan	Shinagawa Intercity Hall	306	Rina (c) vs. Lady C for the Future of Stardom Championship	
11	New Blood 10	August 18, 2023	Tokyo, Japan	Shinagawa Intercity Hall	361	Rina (c) vs. Waka Tsukiyama for the Future of Stardom Championship	
12	New Blood 11	September 28, 2023	Tokyo, Japan	Shinagawa Intercity Hall	357	Bloody Fate (Karma and Starlight Kid) (c) vs. 02line (AZM and Miyu Amasaki) vs. wing★gori (Saya Iida and Hanan) for the New Blood Tag Team Championship	
13	New Blood West 1	November 7, 2023	Osaka, Japan	Azalea Taisho Hall	278	Rina (c) vs. Hanako for the Future of Stardom Championship	
14	New Blood 12	December 25, 2023	Tokyo, Japan	Shinagawa Intercity Hall	254	wing★gori (Hanan and Saya Iida) (c) vs. Reiwa Tokyo Towers (Ami Sohrei and Lady C) for the New Blood Tag Team Championship	
15	New Blood 13	June 21, 2024	Tokyo, Japan	Tokyo New Pier Hall	224	wing★gori (Hanan and Saya Iida) (c) vs. Cosmic Angels (Aya Sakura and Sayaka Kurara) for the New Blood Tag Team Championship	
16	New Blood 14	September 13, 2024	Nagoya, Japan	Chunichi Hall	326	Devil Princess (Rina and Azusa Inaba) vs. Cosmic Angels (Aya Sakura and Yuna Mizumori)	
17	New Blood 15	September 29, 2024	Tokorozawa, Japan	Japan Pavilion Hall A	326	Rina (c) vs. Aya Sakura for the Future of Stardom Championship	
18	New Blood 16	October 19, 2024	Tokyo, Japan	Belle Salle Takadanobaba	236	Devil Princess (Rina and Azusa Inaba) (c) vs. Rice Or Bread (Waka Tsukiyama and Hanako) for the New Blood Tag Team Championship	
19	New Blood West 2	November 16, 2024	Osaka, Japan	Azalea Taisho Hall	246	Devil Princess (Rina and Azusa Inaba) (c) vs. God's Eye (Lady C and Ranna Yagami) for the New Blood Tag Team Championship	
20	New Blood 17	December 26, 2024	Tokyo, Japan	Tokyo New Pier Hall	215	Devil Princess (Rina and Azusa Inaba) (c) vs. Rice Or Bread (Waka Tsukiyama and Hanako) for the New Blood Tag Team Championship	
21	New Blood 18	February 5, 2025	Tokyo, Japan	Tokyo Square	201	God's Eye (Ranna Yagami and Nanami) and Himiko vs. Cosmic Angels (Yuna Mizumori, Aya Sakura and Sayaka Kurara)	
22	New Blood 19	March 1, 2025	Tokyo, Japan	Shinagawa Intercity Hall	178	Rice Or Bread (Waka Tsukiyama and Hanako) (c) vs. Nanami and Himiko for the New Blood Tag Team Championship	
23	New Blood 20	March 27, 2025	Tokyo, Japan	Shinagawa Intercity Hall	296	Rice Or Bread (Waka Tsukiyama and Hanako) (c) vs. Sakuradamon (Aya Sakura and Yuna Mizumori) for the New Blood Tag Team Championship	
24	New Blood 21	May 9, 2025	Tokyo, Japan	Shin-Kiba 1st Ring	268	God's Eye (Hina, Tomoka Inaba and Nanami) vs. H.A.T.E. (Rina, Azusa Inaba and Fukigen Death)	
25	New Blood 22	June 4, 2025	Tokyo, Japan	Tokyo Square	153	Rice or Bread (Waka Tsukiyama and Hanako) (c) vs. Himiko and Yuma Makoto for the New Blood Tag Team Championship	
26	New Blood 23	July 4, 2025	Tokyo, Japan	Tokyo Square	153	Rice or Bread (Waka Tsukiyama and Hanako) (c) vs. Peach & Lily (Momo Kohgo and Yuria Hime) for the New Blood Tag Team Championship	
27	New Blood 24	October 4, 2025	Tokyo, Japan	Belle Salle Takadanobaba	216	Tae Honma vs. Ranna Yagami	
28	New Blood 25	October 17, 2025	Osaka, Japan	Azalea Taisho Hall	225	Empress Nexus Venus (Waka Tsukiyama, Hanako and Rian) vs. Cosmic Angels (Yuna Mizumori, Aya Sakura and Sayaka Kurara)	
29	New Blood 26	October 30, 2025	Tokyo, Japan	Kanda Myojin Hall	239	Rice or Bread (Waka Tsukiyama and Hanako) (c) vs. Sakurara (Aya Sakura and Sayaka Kurara) for the New Blood Tag Team Championship	
30	New Blood 27	December 25, 2025	Tokyo, Japan	Bellesalle Shibuya First	254	Hanako (c) vs. Rian for the Future of Stardom Championship	
31	New Blood 28	February 3, 2026	Tokyo, Japan	Tokyo Square	153	Sakurara (Aya Sakura and Sayaka Kurara) (c) vs. Yuna Mizumori and Anne Kanaya for the New Blood Tag Team Championship	
32	New Blood 29	February 4, 2026	Tokyo, Japan	Tokyo Square	153	Hanako vs. Akira Kurogane	
33	New Blood 30	March 25, 2026	Tokyo, Japan	Shin-Kiba 1st Ring	284	Ranna Yagami (c) vs. Aya Sakura for the Future of Stardom Championship	
(c) – refers to the champion(s) heading into the match

== Upcoming events ==
#	Event	Date	City	Venue	Attendance	Main event	Ref(s)

=== Championships ===
Due to being a separate brand, New Blood disposes its own set of championships which are mainly defended in the flagship events. The Future of Stardom Championship was activating in the main roster before New Blood's debut but slowly became a developmental title for the new sub-brand.

Championship	Current champion(s)	Reign	Date won	Days held	Location	Notes
Future of Stardom Championship	Hanako	1	September 27, 2025	328+	Tokyo, Japan	Defeated Hina at Stardom In Korakuen.
New Blood Tag Team Championship	Sakurara (Aya Sakura and Sayaka Kurara)	1 (1, 1)	October 30, 2025	295+	Tokyo, Japan	Defeated Rice Or Bread (Waka Tsukiyama and Hanako) at New Blood 26.
