= Stardom New Blood 19 =

2025 World Wonder Ring Stardom event

New Blood 19
- Promotion: World Wonder Ring Stardom
- Date: March 1, 2025
- City: Tokyo, Japan
- Venue: Shinagawa Intercity Hall
- Attendance: 178

Event chronology
← Previous; Path of Thunder	Next → Cinderella Tournament

New Blood chronology
← Previous; New Blood 18	Next → New Blood 20

Stardom New Blood 19 (スターダム ニュー ブラッド 19, Sutādamu nyū Buraddo 19) was a professional wrestling event promoted by World Wonder Ring Stardom. The event took place on March 1, 2025, in Tokyo, Japan at the Shinagawa Intercity Hall.

Six matches were contested at the event. The main event saw Rice or Bread (Waka Tsukiyama and Hanako) defeat Nanami and Himiko to retain the New Blood Tag Team Championship. In another prominent match, Sakuradamon (Aya Sakura and Yuna Mizumori) defeated God's Eye (Hina and Ranna Yagami) in a tournament final to become number one contenders to the New Blood Tag Team Championship.

== Production ==
=== Background ===
"New Blood" is a series of events that mainly focus on matches where rookie wrestlers, usually with three or fewer years of in-ring experience, evolve. Besides wrestlers from Stardom, various superstars from multiple promotions of the Japanese independent scene are invited to compete in bouts that are usually going under the stipulation of singles or tag team matches.

The show featured professional wrestling matches that result from scripted storylines, where wrestlers portray villains, heroes, or less distinguishable characters in the scripted events that build tension and culminate in a wrestling match or series of matches.

=== Event ===
The entire event was broadcast live on Stardom's YouTube channel. The show featured a number one contendership tournament for the New Blood Tag Team Championship of which the winners received a title opportunity at New Blood 20. In the incipient first round match of the tournament, Aya Sakura and Yuna Mizumori defeated Kaori Yoneyama and Rian. In the second one, Hina and Ranna Yagami picked up a victory over Akira Kurogane and Yuria Hime to advance into the finals. The third bout saw Sayaka Kurara defeating Miku Kanae in singles competition. Next up, Rina and Ruaka outmatched Miria Koga and Honori Hana in tag team competition. In the semi main event, Aya Sakura and Yuna Mizumori defeated Hina and Ranna Yagami in the contendership tournament finals.

In the main event, Waka Tsukiyama and Hanako defeated Nanami and Himiko to secure the first successful defense of the New Blood Tag Team Championship in that respective reign.

== Results ==
No.	Results	Stipulations	Times
1	Sakuradamon (Aya Sakura and Yuna Mizumori) defeated Kaori Yoneyama and Rian	Tournament semifinal to determine the #1 contenders to the New Blood Tag Team Championship	9:33
2	God's Eye (Hina and Ranna Yagami) defeated Akira Kurogane and Yuria Hime	Tournament semifinal to determine the #1 contenders to the New Blood Tag Team Championship	13:29
3	Sayaka Kurara defeated Miku Kanae	Singles match	7:23
4	H.A.T.E. (Rina and Ruaka) defeated Miria Koga and Honori Hana	Tag team match	13:21
5	Sakuradamon (Aya Sakura and Yuna Mizumori) defeated God's Eye (Hina and Ranna Yagami)	Tournament final to determine the #1 contenders to the New Blood Tag Team Championship	17:22
6	Rice or Bread (Waka Tsukiyama and Hanako) (c) defeated Nanami and Himiko	Tag team match for the New Blood Tag Team Championship	12:01
(c) / – the champion(s) heading into the match
