= Stardom All Star Grand Queendom 2025 =

2025 World Wonder Ring Stardom event

- Promotional poster for the event featuring various wrestlers
- Promotion: World Wonder Ring Stardom
- Date: April 27, 2025
- City: Yokohama, Japan
- Venue: Yokohama Arena
- Attendance: 7,503

Event chronology
← Previous; American Dream 2025	Next → New Blood 21

Grand Queendom chronology
← Previous; 2024	Next → 2026

Stardom All Star Grand Queendom (スターダム オールスター グランドクイーンダム, Sutādamu ōrusutā gurandokuīndamu) was a professional wrestling event promoted by World Wonder Ring Stardom. The event took place on April 27, 2025, in Yokohama at Yokohama Arena. It was the third event under the All Star Grand Queendom chronology.

Eleven matches were contested at the event, including one on the pre-show, and five of Stardom's nine championships were on the line. The main event saw Saya Kamitani defeat Tam Nakano in a Career vs. Career match to retain the World of Stardom Championship, with Nakano retiring from professional wrestling on the spot. In other prominent matches, Starlight Kid defeated AZM to retain the Wonder of Stardom Championship and become the official leader of Neo Genesis, and Syuri defeated Mayu Iwatani to win the IWGP Women's Championship in what ended up being Iwatani's final match for the promotion.

== Production ==
=== Storylines ===
The show featured eleven professional wrestling matches that result from scripted storylines, where wrestlers portrayed villains, heroes, or less distinguishable characters in the scripted events that built tension and culminated in a wrestling match or series of matches.

=== Event ===
The event started with the preshow Stardom Rumble match won by Hanako who last eliminated Miyu Amasaki. After the bout concluded, she expressed the intention to challenge for the Wonder of Stardom Championship on further notice.

In the first main card bout, Hina defeated Ranna Yagami to secure the second consecutive defense of the Future of Stardom Championship in that respective reign. Next up, Sayaka Kurara defeated Thekla in a singles bout from which if Thekla emerged victorious, as the original stipulation hinted, she would have been granted a match against Stardom president Taro Okada whom she was teasing for weeks prior to the event. Sayaka picked up the win as Thekla was forced to join Cosmic Angels but attacked everyone ringside including Okada who fired her due to immediate consequences.. This angle was done as her contract expired; she ended up signing with All Elite Wrestling, which is affiliated with Stardom parent New Japan Pro-Wrestling.

In the fourth bout, Yumiko Hotta defeated Rina in singles competition. Next up, Meiko Satomura, Mika Iwata and Yuna defeated Saori Anou, Natsupoi and Aya Sakura in six-woman tag team competition which was one of Satomura's last bouts of her career. In the sixth bout, Suzu Suzuki defeated Mei Seira in a No Disqualification match which concluded a feud between the two generated by Suzuki's defection from the Neo Genesis unit. Next up, Chihiro Hashimoto defeated Maika to secure the first successful defense of the Sendai Girls World Championship in that respective reign. In the eighth match, Hanan and Saya Iida defeated Stars stablemates Hazuki and Koguma to secure the third consecutive defense of the Goddesses of Stardom Championship in that respective reign.

In the ninth match, Syuri defeated Mayu Iwatani to win the IWGP Women's Championship, ending the latter's reign at 735 days and 9 defenses. Iwatani's reign was the longest of any New Japan Pro Wrestling sanctioned championship at the time. After the bout concluded, Sareee stepped up as Syuri's next challenger.

In the semi main event, Starlight Kid defeated stablemate AZM to secure the third consecutive defense of the Wonder of Stardom Championship in that respective reign and, as the stipulation hinted, officially took the leadership of Neo Genesis.

In the main event, Saya Kamitani defeated Tam Nakano to secure the second consecutive defense of the World of Stardom Championship in that respective reign. As the stipulation hinted, since Nakano lost, she retired from professional wrestling on the spot, getting an emotional sendoff by Kamitani herself.

== Results ==
No.	Results	Stipulations	Times
1^{P}	Hanako won by last eliminating Miyu Amasaki (Note: This match also involved Momo Watanabe, Yuna Mizumori, Lady C, Ruaka, Fukigen Death, Waka Tsukiyama, Momo Kohgo, Tomoka Inaba, Azusa Inaba, Kiyoka Kotatsu, Yuria Hime, Akira Kurogane and Rian.)	Stardom Rumble match for a future title match of the winner's choice	22:36
2	Hina (c) defeated Ranna Yagami by pinfall	Singles match for the Future of Stardom Championship	12:13
3	Sayaka Kurara defeated Thekla by pinfall	Singles match Since Kurara won, Thekla was forced to join Cosmic Angels but refused and got fired instead. Had Thekla won, she would have received a match against Stardom president Taro Okada.	12:48
4	Yumiko Hotta defeated Rina by submission	Singles match	10:02
5	Meiko Satomura, Mika Iwata and Yuna defeated Cosmic Angels (Saori Anou, Natsupoi and Aya Sakura) by pinfall	Six-woman tag team match	13:09
6	Suzu Suzuki defeated Mei Seira by pinfall	No Disqualification match	15:59
7	Chihiro Hashimoto (c) defeated Maika by pinfall	Singles match for the Sendai Girls World Championship	14:52
8	wing★gori (Hanan and Saya Iida) (c) defeated FWC (Hazuki and Koguma) by pinfall	Tag team match for the Goddesses of Stardom Championship	14:26
9	Syuri defeated Mayu Iwatani (c) by pinfall	Singles match for the IWGP Women's Championship	21:53
10	Starlight Kid (c) defeated AZM by pinfall	Singles match for the Wonder of Stardom Championship; Since Starlight Kid won, she became the official leader of Neo Genesis.	20:37
11	Saya Kamitani (c) defeated Tam Nakano by pinfall	Career vs. Career match for the World of Stardom Championship	26:05
(c) / – the champion(s) heading into the match; P / – the match was broadcast on the pre-show

== See also ==
- 2025 in professional wrestling
- List of major World Wonder Ring Stardom events
