= Stardom American Dream 2026 =

2026 World Wonder Ring Stardom professional wrestling event

- Promotional poster of the event
- Promotion: World Wonder Ring Stardom
- Date: April 17, 2026
- City: Paradise, Nevada, United States
- Venue: Pearl Theater at Palms Casino Resort

Event chronology
← Previous; New Blood 30	Next → All Star Grand Queendom

American Dream chronology
← Previous; 2025	Next → —

Stardom American Dream 2026 was a professional wrestling event promoted by World Wonder Ring Stardom and produced by New Japan Pro-Wrestling of America. The event took place on April 17, 2026, in Paradise, Nevada, at the Pearl Theater at Palms Casino Resort and was also held in conjunction with the Palms Slam Fest.

== Production ==
=== Background ===
The show featured professional wrestling matches that result from scripted storylines, where wrestlers portrayed villains, heroes, or less distinguishable characters in the scripted events that built tension and culminated in a wrestling match or series of matches.

=== Event ===
The event started with the tag team confrontation between Brittnie Brooks and Saki, and Natsupoi and Aya Sakura, solded with the victory of the latters. Next up, Maika, Mina Shirakawa and Hanako picked up a victory over Hazuki, Suzu Suzuki and Rina Yamashita in six-woman tag team competition. The third bout saw Athena defeat Rina in singles competition. In the fourth bout, Alex Windsor defeated Saya Iida to secure the first successful defense of the Strong Women's Championship in that respective reign.

In the main event, AZM, Starlight Kid and Mei Seira picked up a victory over Kris Statlander, Willow Nightingale and Harley Cameron in six-woman tag team competition.

== Results ==
No.	Results	Stipulations	Times
1	Cosmic Angels (Natsupoi and Aya Sakura) defeated Brittnie Brooks and Saki by pinfall	Tag team match	8:17
2	Maika, Mina Shirakawa, and Hanako defeated Hazuki and Mi Vida Loca (Suzu Suzuki and Rina Yamashita) by pinfall	Tag team match	12:08
3	Athena defeated Rina by pinfall	Singles match	13:08
4	Alex Windsor (c) defeated Saya Iida by pinfall	Singles match for the NJPW Strong Women's Championship	12:00
5	Neo Genesis (Starlight Kid, AZM, and Mei Seira) defeated Kris Statlander, Willow Nightingale, and Harley Cameron by pinfall	Six-woman tag team match	12:27
(c) / – the champion(s) heading into the match

== See also ==
- 2026 in professional wrestling
- List of major World Wonder Ring Stardom events
