= Stardom American Dream 2025 =

2024 World Wonder Ring Stardom professional wrestling event

- Promotional poster of the event
- Promotion: World Wonder Ring Stardom
- Date: April 17–18, 2025
- City: Enterprise, Nevada (April 17); Paradise, Nevada (April 18)
- Venue: Silverton Veil Pavilion (April 17); MEET Las Vegas (April 18)

Event chronology
← Previous; New Blood 20	Next → All Star Grand Queendom

American Dream chronology
← Previous; 2024	Next → 2026

Stardom American Dream 2025 was a two-night professional wrestling event promoted by World Wonder Ring Stardom and produced by New Japan Pro-Wrestling of America. The event took place on April 17 and 18, 2025, with the first day in Enterprise, Nevada, at the Silverton Veil Pavilion, and the second day in Paradise, Nevada, at the MEET Las Vegas. This will also be the final event for Mina Shirakawa as a member of the Stardom roster.

== Production ==
=== Background ===
The show featured professional wrestling matches that result from scripted storylines, where wrestlers portrayed villains, heroes, or less distinguishable characters in the scripted events that built tension and culminated in a wrestling match or series of matches.

== Night 1 ==
=== Results ===
The first night of the event from April 17 started with the tag team confrontation between Mazzerati and Starlight Kid, and Ram Kaicho and AZM, solded with the victory of the latters. Next up, Jody Threat and Suzu Suzuki picked up a victory over Unagi Sayaka and Airica Demia. The third bout saw Saya Iida and Hanan outmatching Kelsey Heather and Hazuki in tag team competition. Next up, Hanako and Mina Shirakawa picked up a victory over Momo Watanabe and Natsuko Tora in another tag team competition bout. In the semi main event, Vipress and Syuri defeated Kalientita and Konami in tag team competition.

In the main event, Maika defeated Thekla in singles competition.

Day 1 (April 17)
No.	Results	Stipulations	Times
1	Ram Kaicho and AZM defeated Mazzerati and Starlight Kid by pinfall	Tag team match	12:09
2	Jody Threat and Suzu Suzuki defeated Unagi Sayaka and Airica Demia by pinfall	Tag team match	9:15
3	wing★gori (Saya Iida and Hanan) defeated Kelsey Heather and Hazuki by pinfall	Tag team match	9:54
4	Empress Nexus Venus (Hanako and Mina Shirakawa) defeated XL (Momo Watanabe and Natsuko Tora) by pinfall	Tag team match	12:15
5	Vipress and Syuri defeated Kalientita and Konami by pinfall	Tag team match	11:58
6	Maika defeated Thekla by pinfall	Singles match	17:26

== Night 2 ==
=== Results ===
The second night of the event from April 18 started with the tag team confrontation between Raychell Rose and Mina Shirakawa, and Suzu Suzuki and Hazuki, solded with the victory of the latters. Next up, Syuri picked up a victory over Kelsey Heather in singles competition. The third bout saw Thekla, Natsuko Tora and Clark Connors outmatch Saya Iida, Hanan) and The DKC in an intergender six-person tag team competition. In the fourth bout, Johnnie Robbie and AZM defeated Maya World and Starlight Kid in tag team action.

In the main event, Hanako, Maika and Megan Bayne defeated Momo Watanabe, Konami and Kalientita in six-woman tag team competition.

Day 2 (April 18)
No.	Results	Stipulations	Times
1	Suzu Suzuki and Hazuki defeated Raychell Rose and Mina Shirakawa by pinfall	Tag team match	10:23
2	Syuri defeated Kelsey Heather by submission	Singles match	8:32
3	H.A.T.E. (Thekla and Natsuko Tora) and Clark Connors defeated wing★gori (Saya Iida and Hanan) and The DKC by pinfall	Six-person tag team match	14:20
4	Johnnie Robbie and AZM defeated Maya World and Starlight Kid by pinfall	Tag team match	11:37
5	Hai High Mate (Hanako and Maika) and Megan Bayne defeated H.A.T.E. (Momo Watanabe and Konami) and Kalientita by pinfall	Six-woman tag team match	12:51

== See also ==
- 2025 in professional wrestling
- List of major World Wonder Ring Stardom events
