= Matoi Hamabe =

Japanese professional wrestler

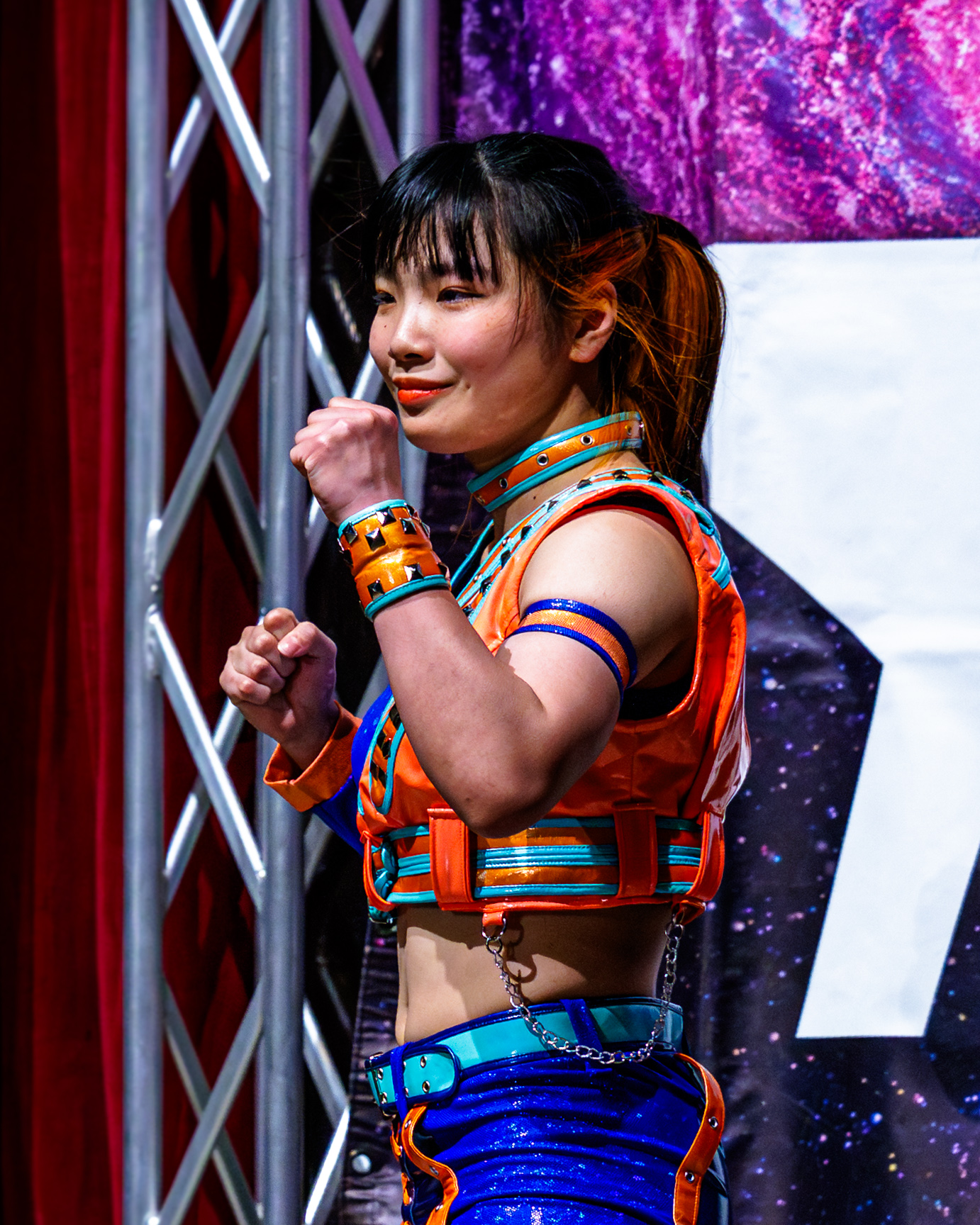
- Hamabe in April 2026

Personal information
- Born: June 22, 2005 (age 21) Isumi, Japan

Professional wrestling career
- Ring name: Matoi Hamabe
- Billed height: 155 cm (5 ft 1 in)
- Billed weight: 56.5 kg (125 lb)
- Trained by: Hanan
- Debut: 2024

Matoi Hamabe (浜辺 纏, Hamabe Matoi; born June 22, 2005) is a Japanese professional wrestler. She works for World Wonder Ring Stardom, where she is a member of Stars.

== Professional wrestling career ==
=== World Wonder Ring Stardom (2024–present) ===
In April 2024, Hamabe joined World Wonder Ring Stardom as a trainee.

Hamabe made her official in-ring debut at New Blood West 2 on November 16, 2024, where she faced Hanan in a losing effort.
