= Neo Genesis (professional wrestling) =

Professional wrestling stable

- Official logo (2024–present)

Stable
- Leader: Starlight Kid
- Members: AZM; Mei Seira; Miyu Amasaki; Ema Maishima
- Former members: Suzu Suzuki
- Debut: July 27, 2024
- Years active: 2024–present

Neo Genesis (ネオジェネシス, Neojeneshisu) is a professional wrestling stable mainly performing in the Japanese professional wrestling promotion World Wonder Ring Stardom. Led by Starlight Kid, the stable also consists of AZM, Mei Seira, Miyu Amasaki, and Ema Maishima.

== History ==
=== Formation (June 2024–present) ===
At Stardom All Star Grand Queendom 2024 on April 27, 2024, Crazy Star (Suzu Suzuki and Mei Seira) secured their second defense of the Goddesses of Stardom Championship by defeating FWC (Hazuki and Koguma) from Stars, 02line (AZM and Miyu Amasaki) from Queen's Quest, and YoungOED (Ruaka and Starlight Kid) from Oedo Tai, in a four-way tag team match. After the match, Ruaka and other members of Oedo Tai assaulted Starlight Kid, kicking her out of the group. At The Conversion on June 22, Queen's Quest's Saya Kamitani, AZM, Lady C, Hina and Miyu Amasaki fell short to Oedo Tai's Natsuko Tora, Thekla, Rina, Momo Watanabe and Ruaka in a Ten-woman elimination tag team match. Per the stipulation, since Kamitani was the last wrestler eliminated, AZM, Hina, Lady C, and Amasaki all had to leave Queen's Quest, assenting Kamitani to remain the sole member of the unit in the process. Following these events, AZM and Amasaki attracted the attention of Suzuki, Seira, and Starlight Kid, as all five were simultaneously unaffiliated with any of Stardom's exiting units.

On the first night of the Stardom Sapporo World Rendezvous from July 27, Kid, AZM, Seira, Suzuki and Amasaki officiated the birth of the "Neo Genesis" unit as they defeated Stars (Hazuki, Koguma, Hanan, Saya Iida and Momo Kohgo) in a ten-woman tag team match as their inaugural bout. All five members would compete representing the stable in the Stardom 5 Star Grand Prix 2024, with Kid and AZM both advancing to the quarterfinals before being eliminated. At Nagoya Golden Fight on October 5, Amasaki defeated Rina to win the Future of Stardom Championship, ending the latter's 512-day reign which was the longest to date. Starlight Kid vacated her Spark Joshi World Championship to focus on the Wonder of Stardom Championship, which she won at Dream Queendom 2024 on December 29 by defeating Natsupoi. The trio of Amasaki, Kid and AZM won the Artist of Stardom Championship at Supreme Fight 2025 on February 2, 2025, by defeating Cosmic Angels (Saori Anou, Tam Nakano and Natsupoi). On Stardom Path of Thunder, Amasaki lost the Future of Stardom title to Hina and Kid retained the Wonder of Stardom title against Rina in her first defense. On April 2, during an eight-woman tag team match with the former Oedo Tai, now born as H.A.T.E, the match ended in a no contest when Suzuki attacked Seira, then rebuffed Natsuko Tora's belief that Suzuki would join her faction by attacking her as well. Suzuki left Neo Genesis and became independent, but still reluctantly teamed with Seira and AZM multiple times, with Neo Genesis losing and frequent brawls between Mei and Suzu. On April 23, Seira and Amasaki teamed with Pro Wrestling Wave's Kohaku in a match against Suzuki and mystery teammates, revealed as Itsuki Aoki and Rina Yamashita, in a six-woman tag team match; Seira's team lost to Suzuki's unit, which was then presented as Mi Vida Loca.

=== Under Starlight Kid's leadership (2025–present) ===
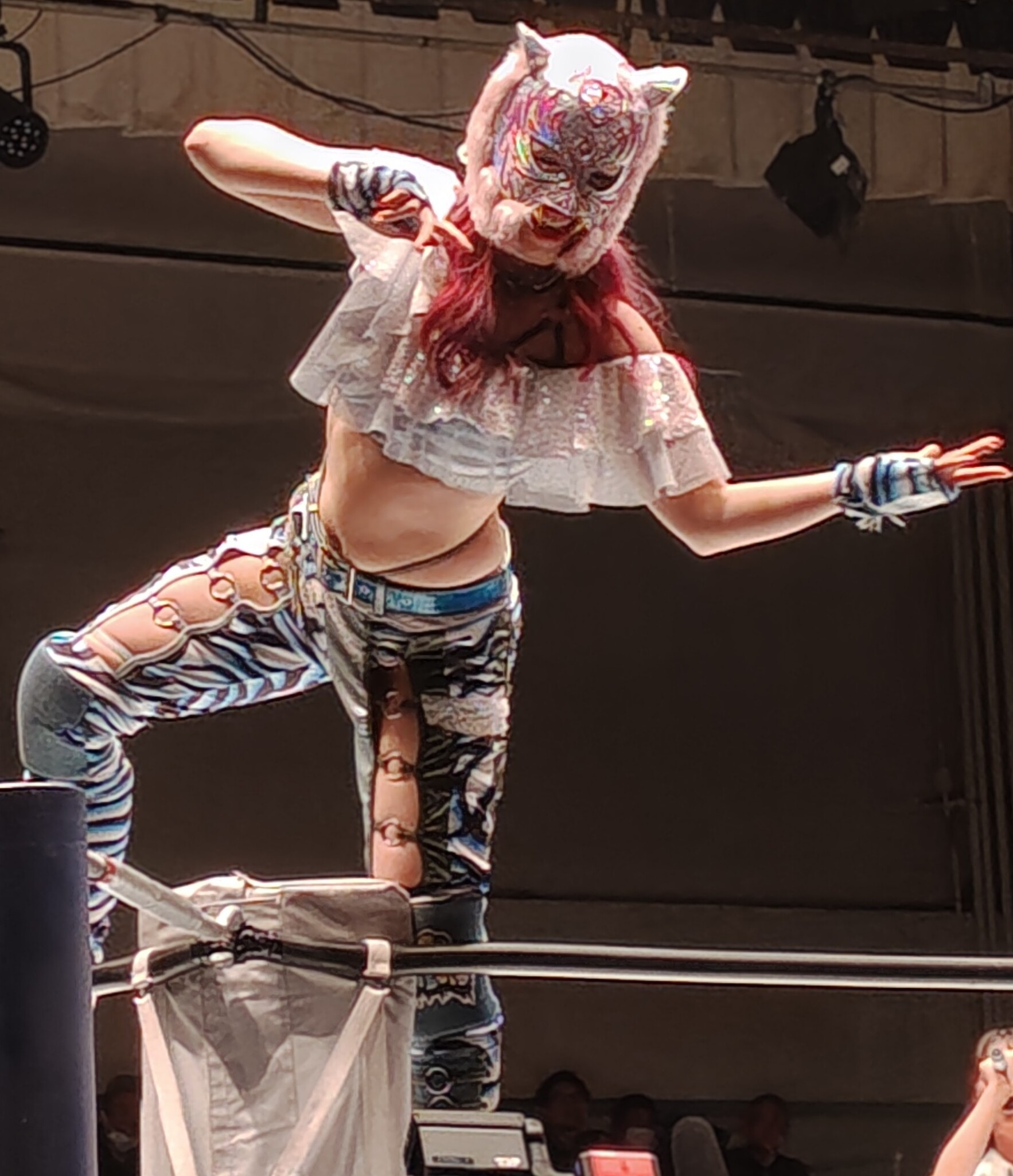
First and current leader of the stable, Starlight Kid

On April 27 at Stardom All Star Grand Queendom 2025, Seira lost to Suzuki in a No Disqualification match to end their feud. That same night, Kid defeated AZM to retain her Wonder of Stardom Championship, also becoming the stable's first official leader per match stipulations. On September 10, Kid, AZM, and Amasaki lost the Artist of Stardom Championship to H.A.T.E. (Konami, Rina, and Fukigen Death), ending their reign at 220 days. On November 3, Kid lost her title to Konami, ending her reign at 309 days. On December 26, Seira dropped her title to Yuna Mizumori, ending her reign at 514 days.

On April 26, 2026, at All Star Grand Queendom 2026, 02line defeated BMI2000 (Natsuko Tora and Ruaka) to win the Goddesses of Stardom Championship for the first time in both AZM and Amasaki's careers. During Queens Dynasty on May 23, Ema Maishima stepped in for the sidelined Amasaki to team with AZM against Hazuki and Koguma, with the scheduled defense being made a non-title match as a result. Despite losing the match, AZM invited Maishima to join Neo Genesis, but Maishima asked for more time to think about it. On June 6, Amasaki would defeat Maishima in a singles match. Afterward, Maishima asked to join the faction, and was formally accepted as its newest member.

== Members ==
Neo Genesis
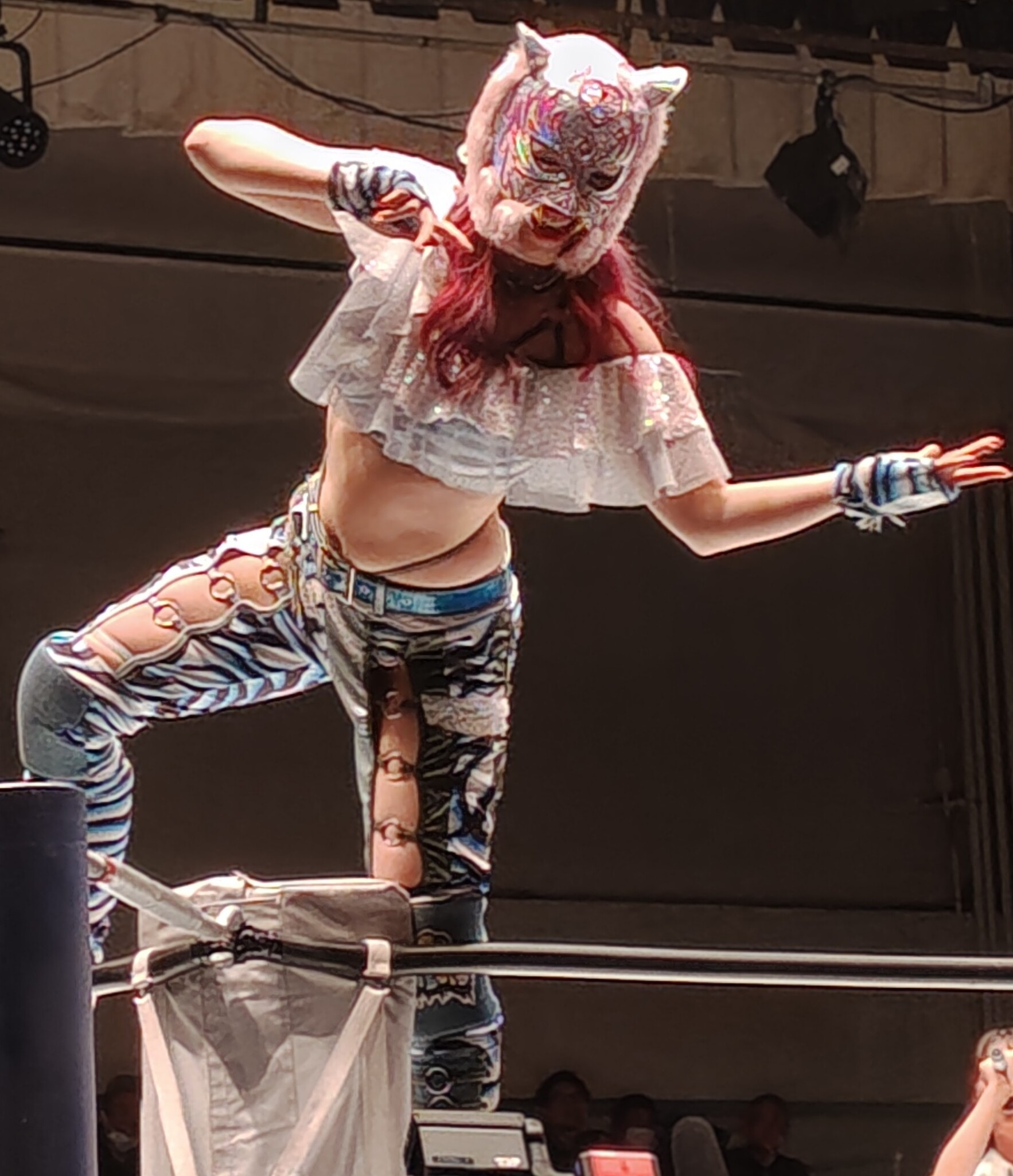
Starlight Kid (I)

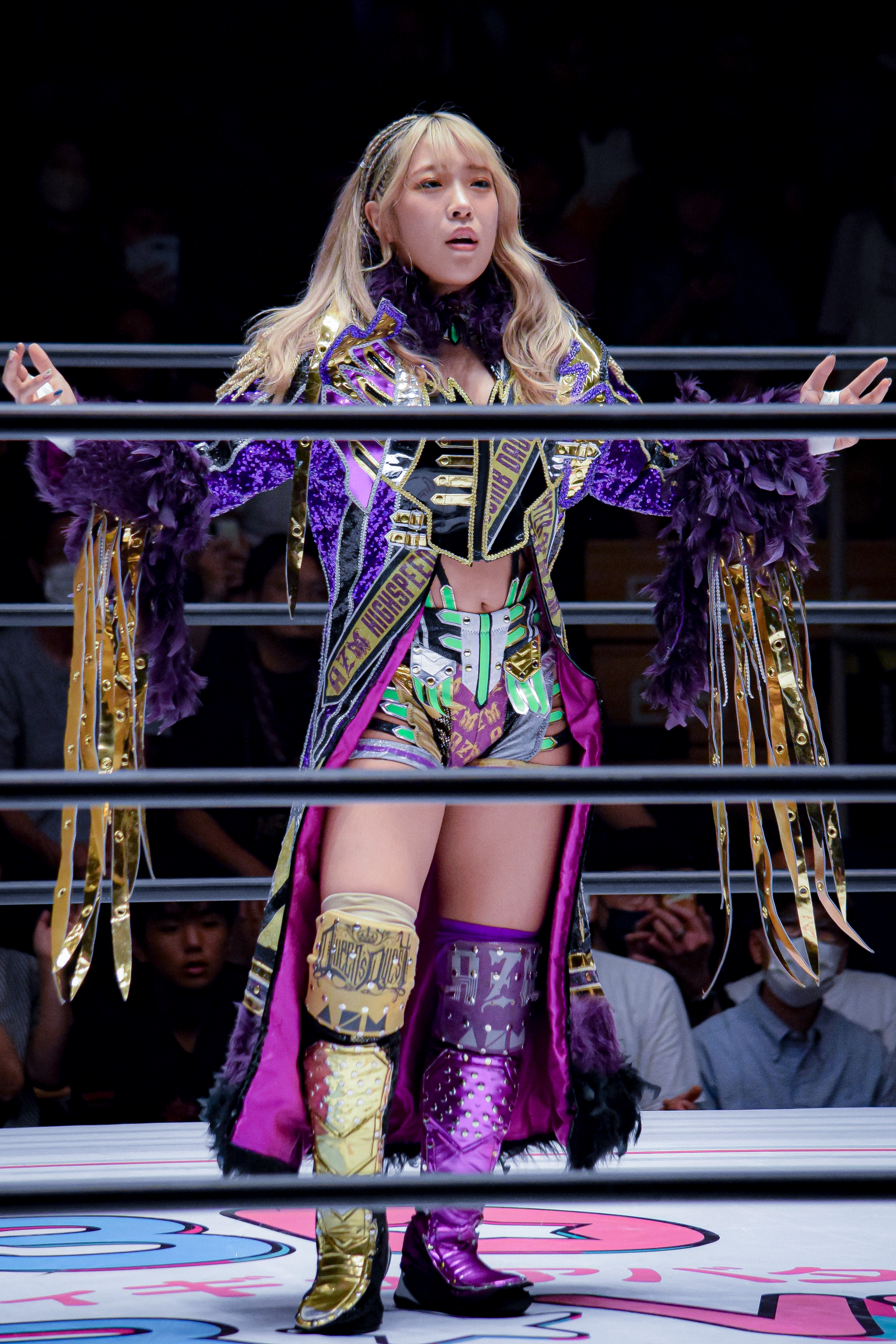
AZM

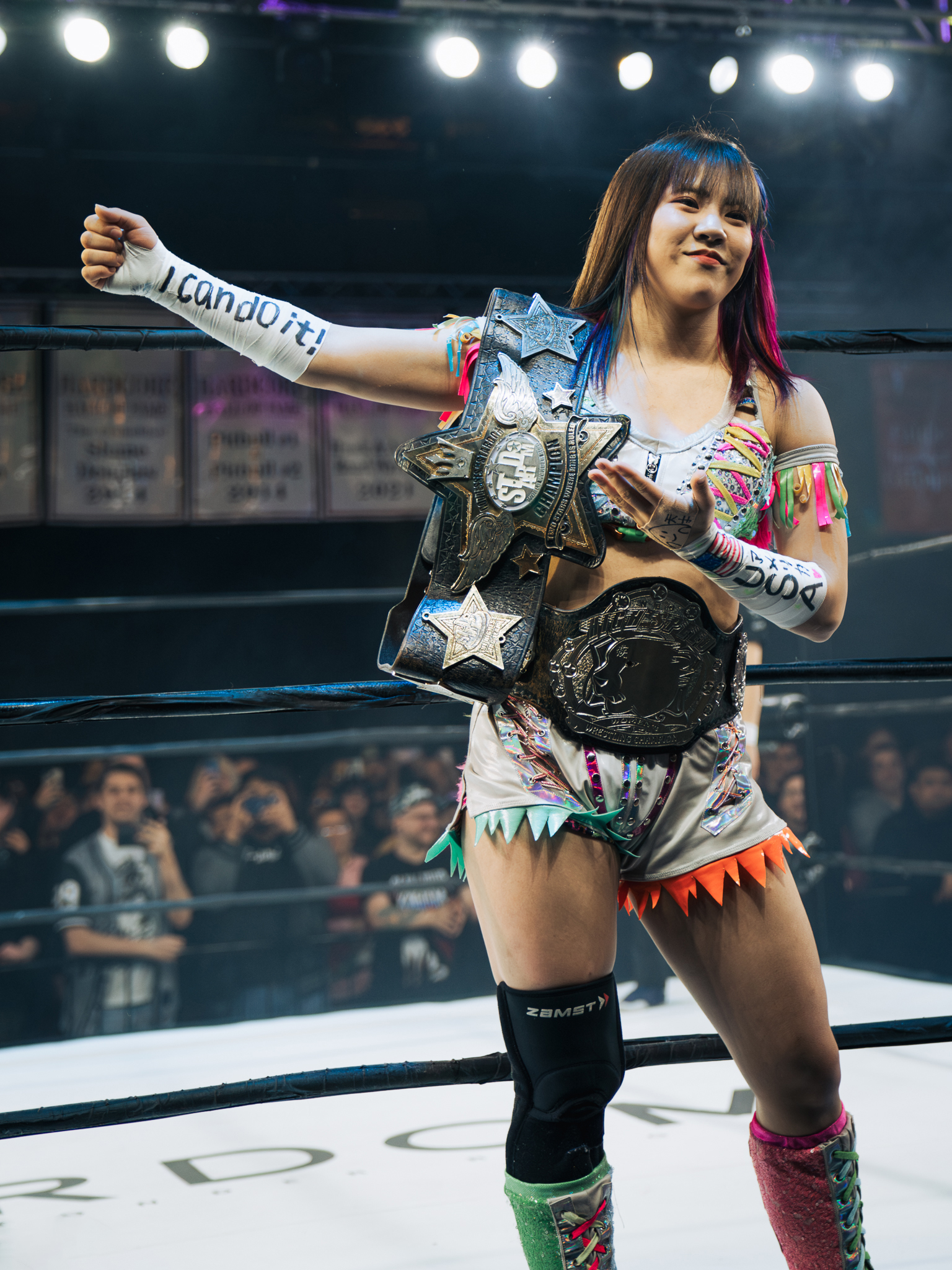
Mei Seira

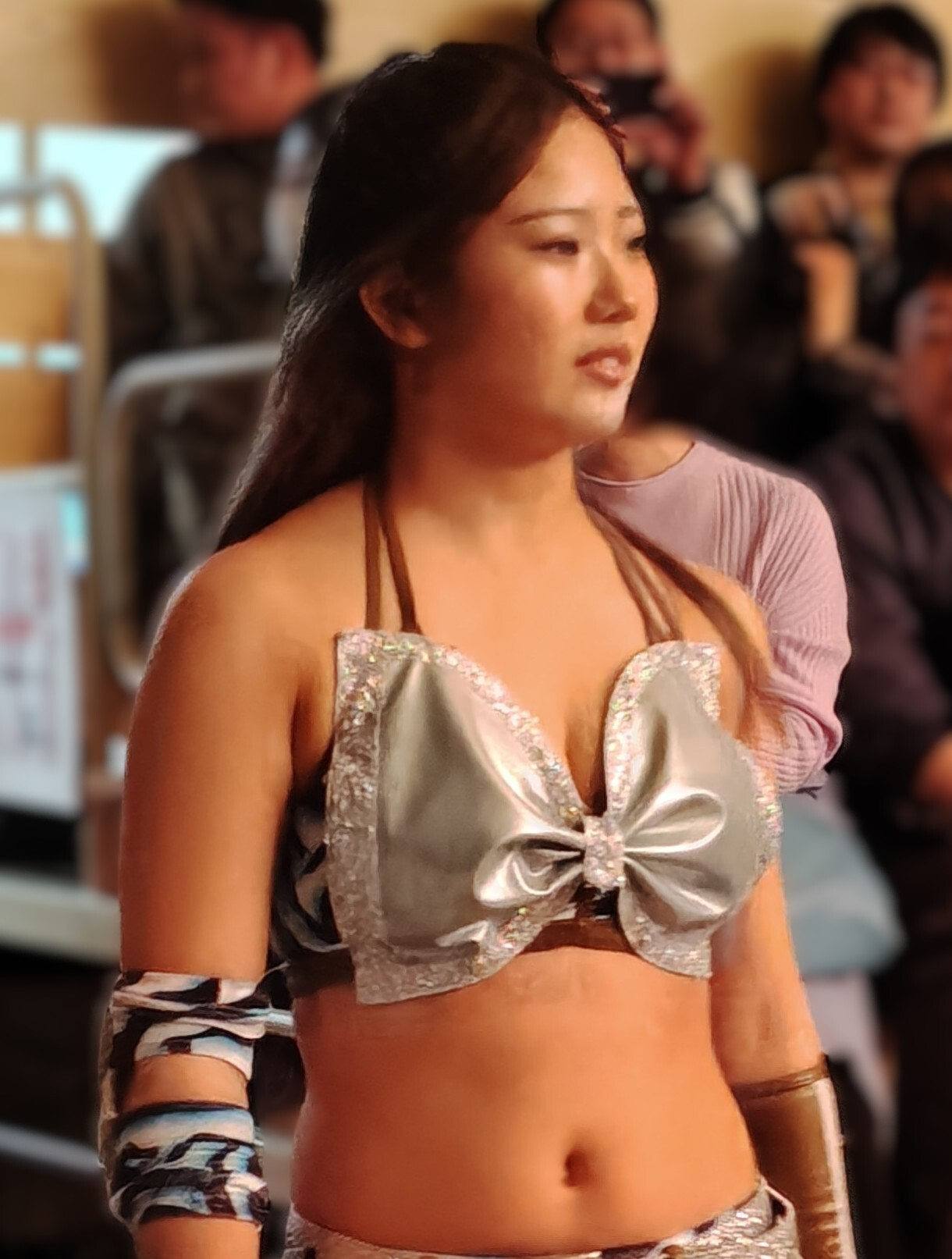
Miyu Amasaki

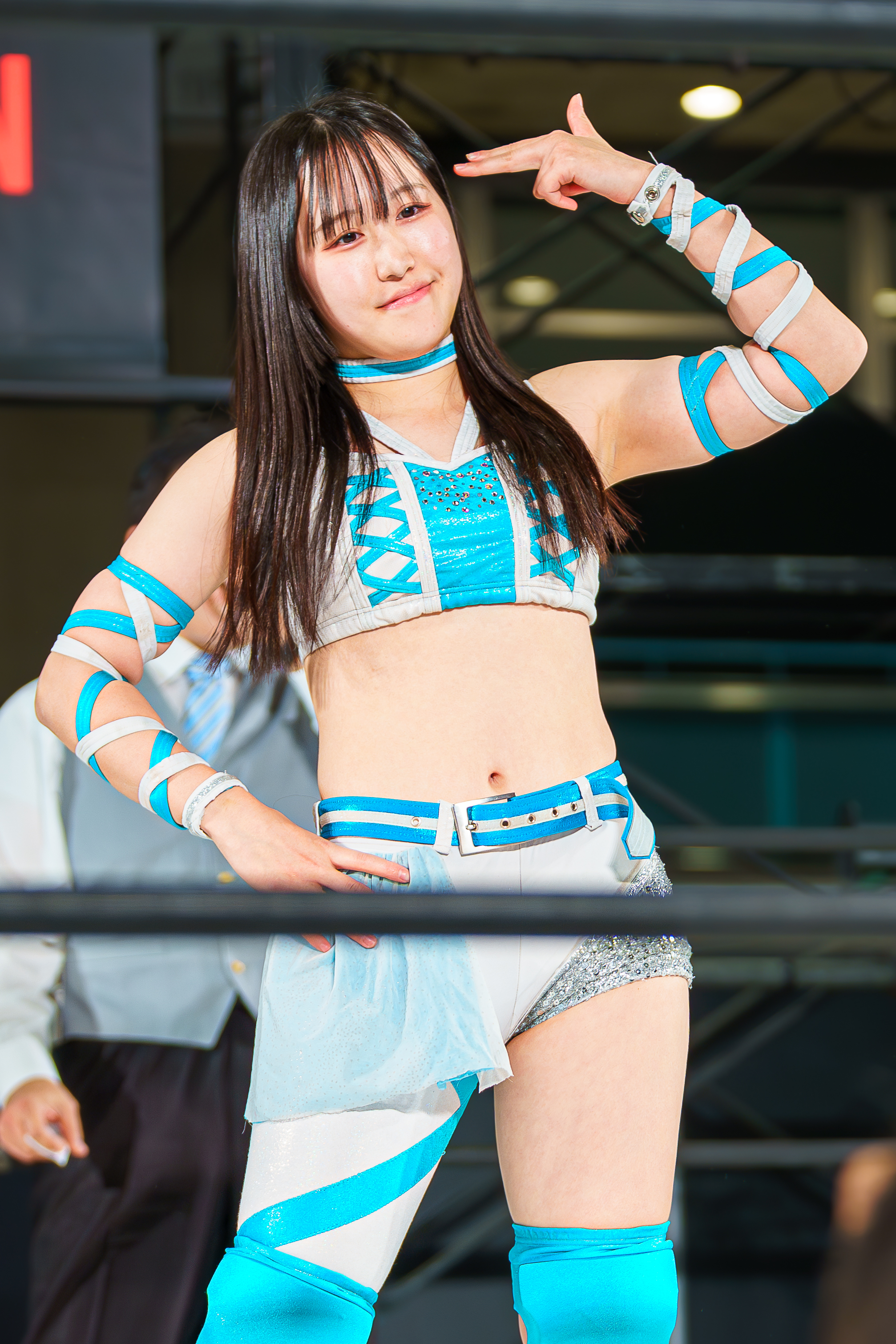
Ema Maishima

*	Founding member
I	Leader

=== Current ===
Member		Joined
Starlight Kid (Note: Neo Genesis did not choose a leader at their formation. However, Starlight Kid was assumed to be the defacto leader of the unit due to her actions and her senior status for several months until All Star Grand Queendom on April 27, 2025, where Kid defeated AZM to officially take the leader spot of the unit.)	*I	July 27, 2024
AZM	*	July 27, 2024
Mei Seira	*	July 27, 2024
Miyu Amasaki	*	July 27, 2024
Ema Maishima		June 6, 2026

=== Former ===
Member		Joined	Left
Suzu Suzuki	*	July 27, 2024	April 2, 2025

=== Associates ===
Associate	Joined
Kohaku	September 14, 2024
Haruka Umesaki	October 26, 2024

== Sub-groups ==
=== Current ===
Affiliate	Members	Tenure	Type
Star Bomb	Starlight Kid; AZM	2024–present	Tag Team
02line	AZM; Miyu Amasaki	2024–present	Tag team

=== Former ===
Affiliate	Members	Tenure	Type
Crazy Star	Suzu Suzuki; Mei Seira	2024–2025	Tag team

== Championships and accomplishments ==
- New Japan Pro Wrestling
  - Strong Women's Championship (1 time) – AZM
- Pro Wrestling Illustrated
  - Ranked Starlight Kid No. 14 of the top 250 female singles wrestlers in the PWI Women's 250 in 2025
  - Ranked AZM No. 31 of the top 250 female singles wrestlers in the PWI Women's 250 in 2025
  - Ranked Seira No. 65 of the top 250 female singles wrestlers in the PWI Women's 250 in 2025
  - Ranked Amasaki No. 118 of the top 250 female singles wrestlers in the PWI Women's 250 in 2025
- Spark Joshi Puroresu of America
  - Spark Joshi World Championship (1 time) - Kid
- Consejo Mundial de Lucha Libre
  - Copa Viva Mexico (2026) - Kid
- World Wonder Ring Stardom
  - Artist of Stardom Championship (1 time) – Kid, AZM and Amasaki
  - Goddesses of Stardom Championship (1 time, current) – AZM and Amasaki
  - High Speed Championship (1 time) – Seira
  - Future of Stardom Championship (1 time) – Amasaki
  - Wonder of Stardom Championship (1 time) – Starlight Kid
  - Unit League Tournament Winners (2025)
  - 5★Star GP Awards (3 times)
    - Blue Stars Best Match Award (2024) vs. Saori Anou on August 15 in Blue Stars A – Kid
    - Blue Stars Best Match Award (2024) vs. Thekla on August 20 in Blue Stars B – Suzuki
    - 5★Star GP Fighting Spirit Award (2024) – AZM
  - Year-End Awards (2 times)
    - Best Technique Award (2024) – Seira
    - Shining Award (2024) – Kid
