= New Blood Tag Team Championship =

Professional wrestling tag team championship

- Current design of the belts (2023–present)

Details
- Promotion: World Wonder Ring Stardom
- Date established: December 16, 2022
- Current champions: Meni☆Mani (Rian and Kikyo Furusawa)
- Date won: October 20, 2026
Statistics
- First champions: Bloody Fate (Starlight Kid and Karma)
- Longest reign: Sakurara (Aya Sakura and Sayaka Kurara) (355 days)
- Shortest reign: Devil Princess (Rina and Azusa Inaba) (156 days)
- Oldest champion: Waka Tsukiyama (32 years and 11 months)
- Youngest champion: Azusa Inaba (16 years, 7 months and 24 days)
- Heaviest champion: Hanako (176 lb (80 kg))
- Lightest champion: Starlight Kid (99 lb (45 kg))

The New Blood Tag Team Championship (ニュー・ブラッド・タッグ王座, Nyū Buraddo Taggu Ōza) is a women's professional wrestling tag team championship owned by the World Wonder Ring Stardom promotion and acts as a developmental championship in the "New Blood" branch of events. The current champions are Meni☆Mani (Rian and Kikyo Furusawa), who are in their first reign as a team. They defeated previous champions Sakurara (Aya Sakura and Sayaka Kurara) at Nighter in Korakuen on October 20, 2026.

== Title history ==
Despite first being mentioned in December 2022, the official design of the titles was revealed on March 7, 2023, during a press conference. They are inspired by the designs of New Japan Pro Wrestling's Strong Openweight Tag Team Championship, having the front larger plate and straps identically with them. On January 20, at New Blood 7, an eight-team tournament to crown the inaugural champions has begun. At New Blood Premium on March 25, Oedo Tai (Starlight Kid and Karma) defeated God's Eye (Mirai and Tomoka Inaba) in the tournament finals to become the first titleholders. Following the match, Starlight Kid and Karma declared they would adopt the team name Bloody Fate.

The first defense of the title was Bloody Fate's successful defense against the team of Hanako and Lady C on May 12, 2023, during New Blood 8.

=== Inaugural tournament ===
Quarterfinals; New Blood 7 (January 20)
Club Venus (Mariah May and Xia Brookside)	Pin
Bloody Fate (Starlight Kid and Karma)	12:26
Queen's Quest (Hina and Lady C (Note: Miyu Amasaki was initially scheduled to team with Hina but was replaced by Lady C on the day of the event.))	9:05
Chanyota and Mai Sakurai	Pin
God's Eye (Ami Sourei and Nanami)	Pin
Momo Kohgo and Momoka Hanazono	11:53
God's Eye (Mirai and Tomoka Inaba)	Pin
wing★gori (Hanan and Saya Iida)	12:02

Semifinals; New Blood Premium (March 25)
Bloody Fate (Starlight Kid and Karma)	Pin
Chanyota and Mai Sakurai	7:05
God's Eye (Ami Sourei and Nanami)	10:19
God's Eye (Mirai and Tomoka Inaba)	Sub

Finals; New Blood Premium (March 25)
Bloody Fate (Starlight Kid and Karma)	Pin
God's Eye	13:07

== Reigns ==
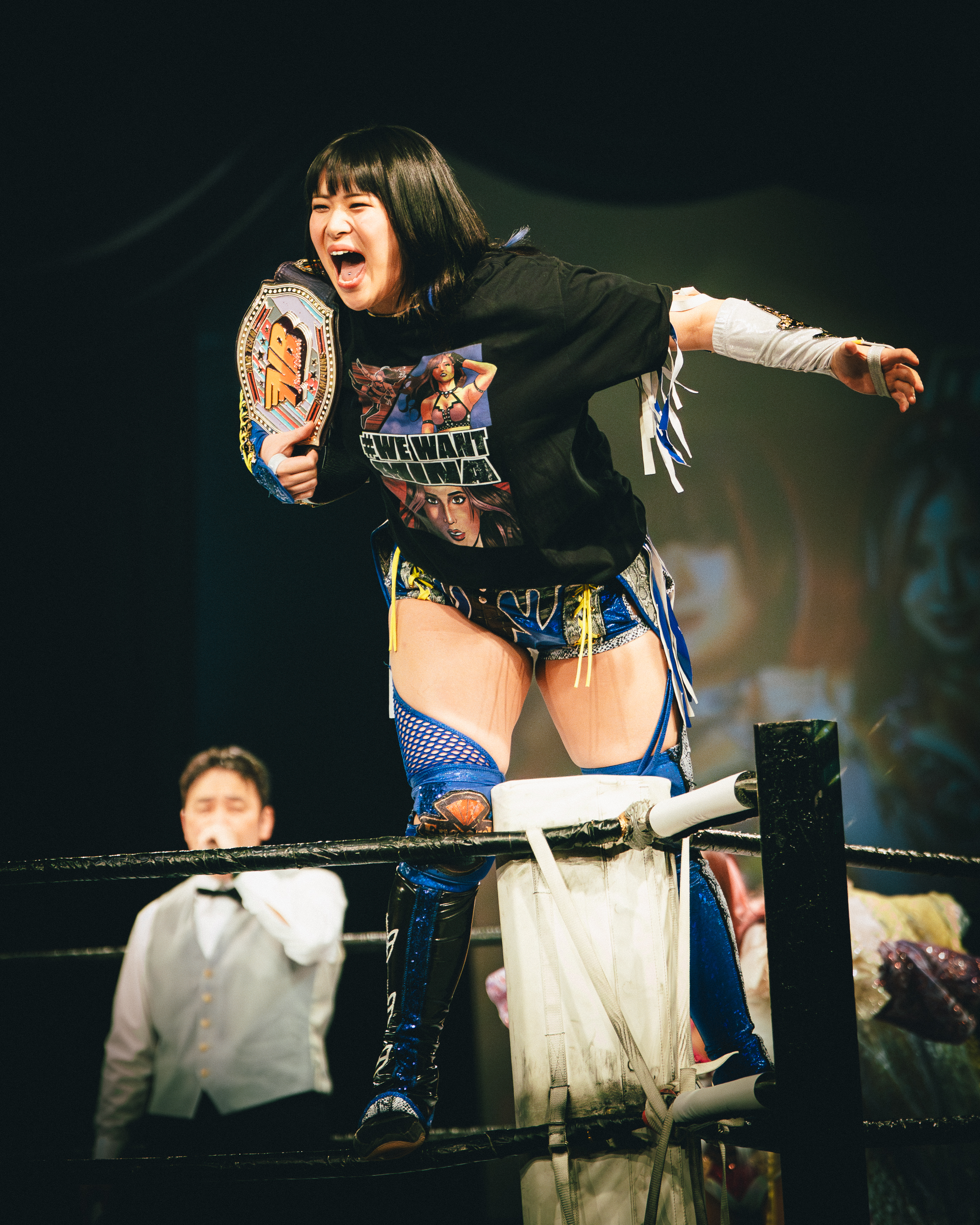
Hanako as one half of the New Blood Tag Team Champions in 2025.

As of November 1, 2026, there have been a total of six reigns shared between six different teams consisting of 12 distinctive champions. Bloody Fate (Starlight Kid and Karma) were the inaugural champions. Meni☆Mani (Rian and Kikyo Furusawa) are the current champions in their first reign as a team. They won the title by defeating Sakurara (Aya Sakura and Sayaka Kurara) at Nighter in Korakuen in Tokyo, Japan, on October 20, 2026.

Key
No.	Overall reign number
Reign	Reign number for the specific team—reign numbers for the individuals are in parentheses, if different
Days	Number of days held
Defenses	Number of successful defenses
+	Current reign is changing daily

No.	Champion	Championship change			Reign statistics			Notes	Ref.
No.	Champion	Date	Event	Location	Reign	Days	Defenses	Notes	Ref.
World Wonder Ring Stardom: New Blood
1	Bloody Fate (Starlight Kid and Karma)	March 25, 2023	New Blood Premium	Yokohama, Japan	1	188	2	Defeated God's Eye (Mirai and Tomoka Inaba) in the finals of an eight-team tournament to become the inaugural champions.	
2	wing★gori (Hanan and Saya Iida)	September 28, 2023	New Blood 11	Tokyo, Japan	1	299	4	This was a three-way tag team match, also involving 02line (AZM and Miyu Amasaki).	
3	Devil Princess (Rina and Azusa Inaba)	July 23, 2024	Stardom Nighter in Korakuen II	Tokyo, Japan	1	156	2	Rina and Inaba initially won the championships as part of the Oedo Tai unit which dissolved at Stardom Sapporo World Rendezvous on July 28, 2024. Since the date, they transferred to the newly created stable of H.A.T.E.	
4	Rice or Bread (Hanako and Waka Tsukiyama)	December 26, 2024	New Blood 17	Tokyo, Japan	1	308	4		
5	Sakurara (Aya Sakura and Sayaka Kurara)	October 30, 2025	New Blood 26	Tokyo, Japan	1	355	2		
6	Meni☆Mani (Rian and Kikyo Furusawa)	October 20, 2026	Nighter in Korakuen	Tokyo, Japan	1	12+	0		

== Combined reigns ==
As of November 1, 2026.

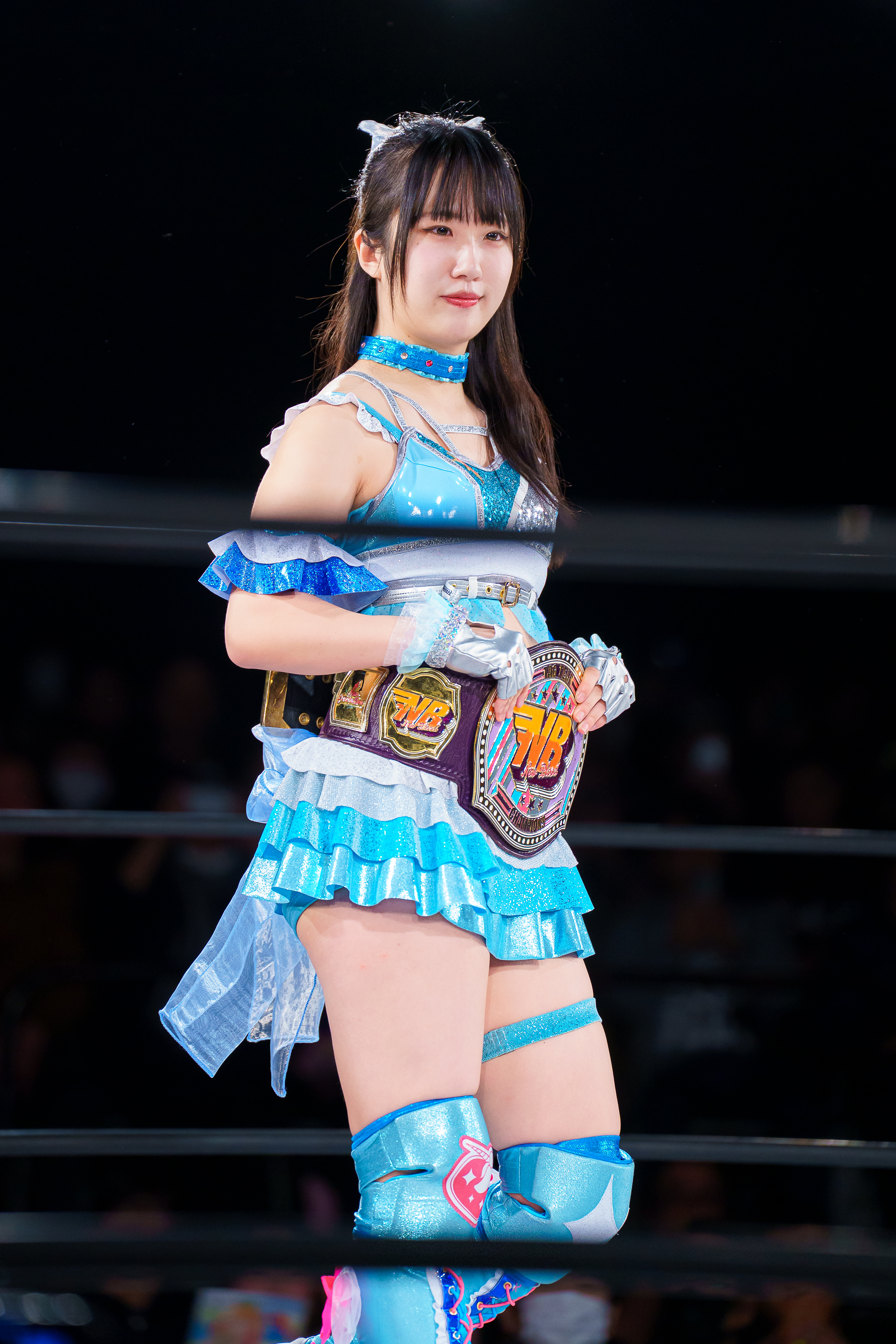
One-half of the previous champions, Sayaka Kurara, shown here with one of the belts.

†	Indicates the current champion

=== By team ===
Rank	Team	No. of reigns	Combined defenses	Combined days
1	Sakurara (Aya Sakura and Sayaka Kurara)	1	2	355
2	Rice or Bread (Hanako and Waka Tsukiyama)	1	4	308
3	wing★gori (Hanan and Saya Iida)	1	4	299
4	Bloody Fate (Starlight Kid and Karma)	1	2	188
5	Devil Princess (Rina and Azusa Inaba)	1	2	156
6	Meni☆Mani (Rian and Kikyo Furusawa) †	1	0	12+

=== By wrestler ===
Rank	Wrestler	No. of reigns	Combined defenses	Combined days
1	Aya Sakura	1	2	355
1	Sayaka Kurara	1	2	355
2	Hanako	1	4	308
2	Waka Tsukiyama	1	4	308
5	Hanan	1	4	299
5	Saya Iida	1	4	299
7	Starlight Kid	1	2	188
7	Karma	1	2	188
9	Rina	1	2	156
9	Azusa Inaba	1	2	156
11	Rian †	1	0	12+
11	Kikyo Furusawa †	1	0	12+
