= Anne Kanaya =

Japanese professional wrestler

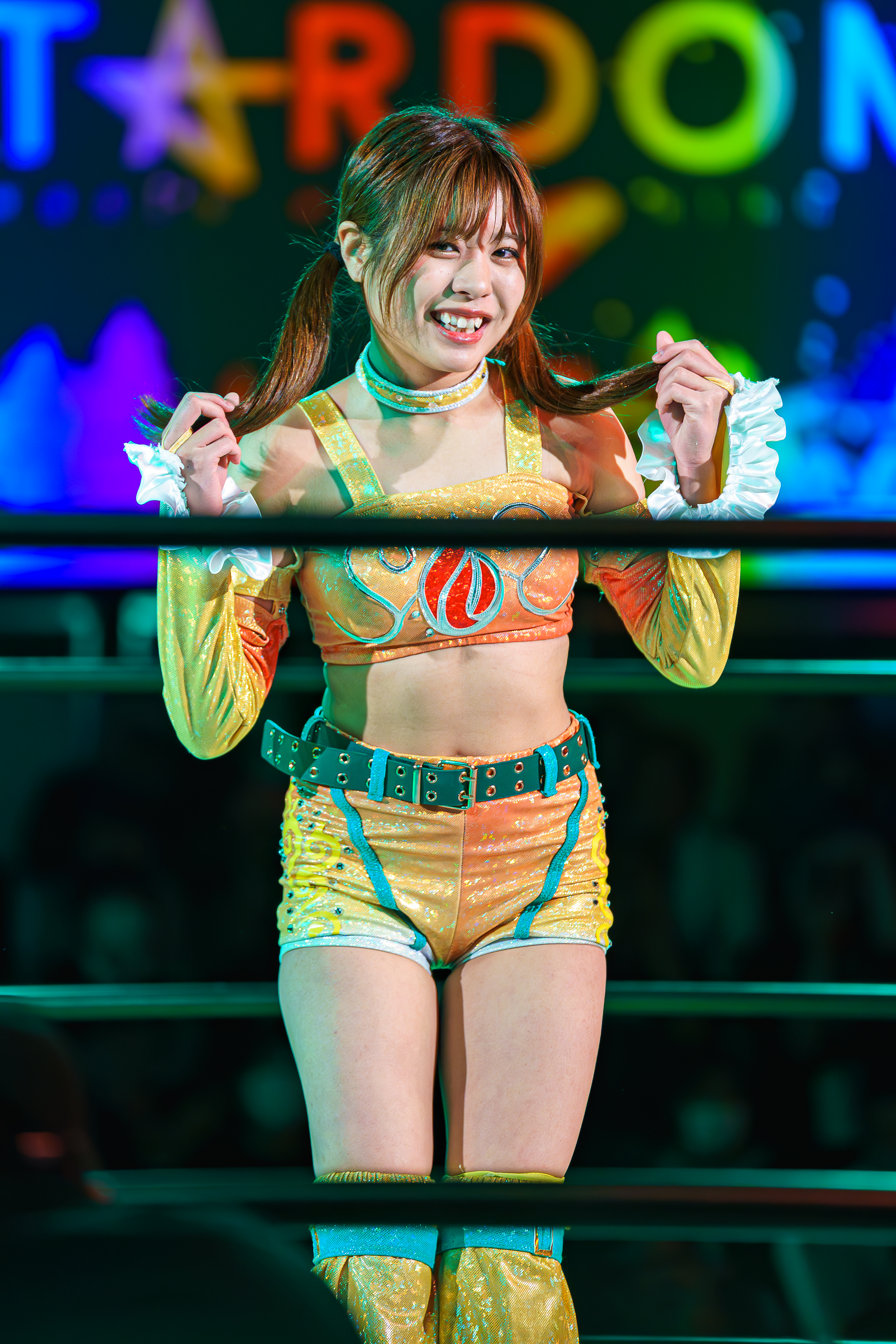
- Anne in December 2025

Personal information
- Born: July 22, 1998 (age 28) Urasoe, Okinawa, Japan

Professional wrestling career
- Ring name: Anne Kanaya
- Billed height: 153 cm (5 ft 0 in)
- Billed weight: 50 kg (110 lb)
- Trained by: Yuna Mizumori
- Debut: 2025

Anne Kanaya (金屋 あんね, Kanaya Anne; born July 22, 1998) is a Japanese professional wrestler. She works for World Wonder Ring Stardom and is a member of Cosmic Angels.

== Professional wrestling career ==
=== World Wonder Ring Stardom (2025–present) ===
In November 2023, Kanaya came to Tokyo to join World Wonder Ring Stardom as a trainee. Kanaya made her official in-ring debut in Okinawa on March 20, 2025, where she faced Yuna Mizumori. On April 10, 2025, Kanaya was sidelined with an hand-injury and was unable to compete. On December 12, 2025, Kanaya lost against Matoi Hamabe in her return match.

On February 2, 2026, Kanaya and Mizumori unsuccessfully challenged Sakurara (Aya Sakura and Sayaka Kurara) for the New Blood Tag Team Championships.

==== Cosmic Angels (2026-present) ====
On June 30, 2026, Kanaya was accepted into Cosmic Angels after passing the final audition.
