= Azusa Inaba =

Japanese professional wrestler (born 2007)

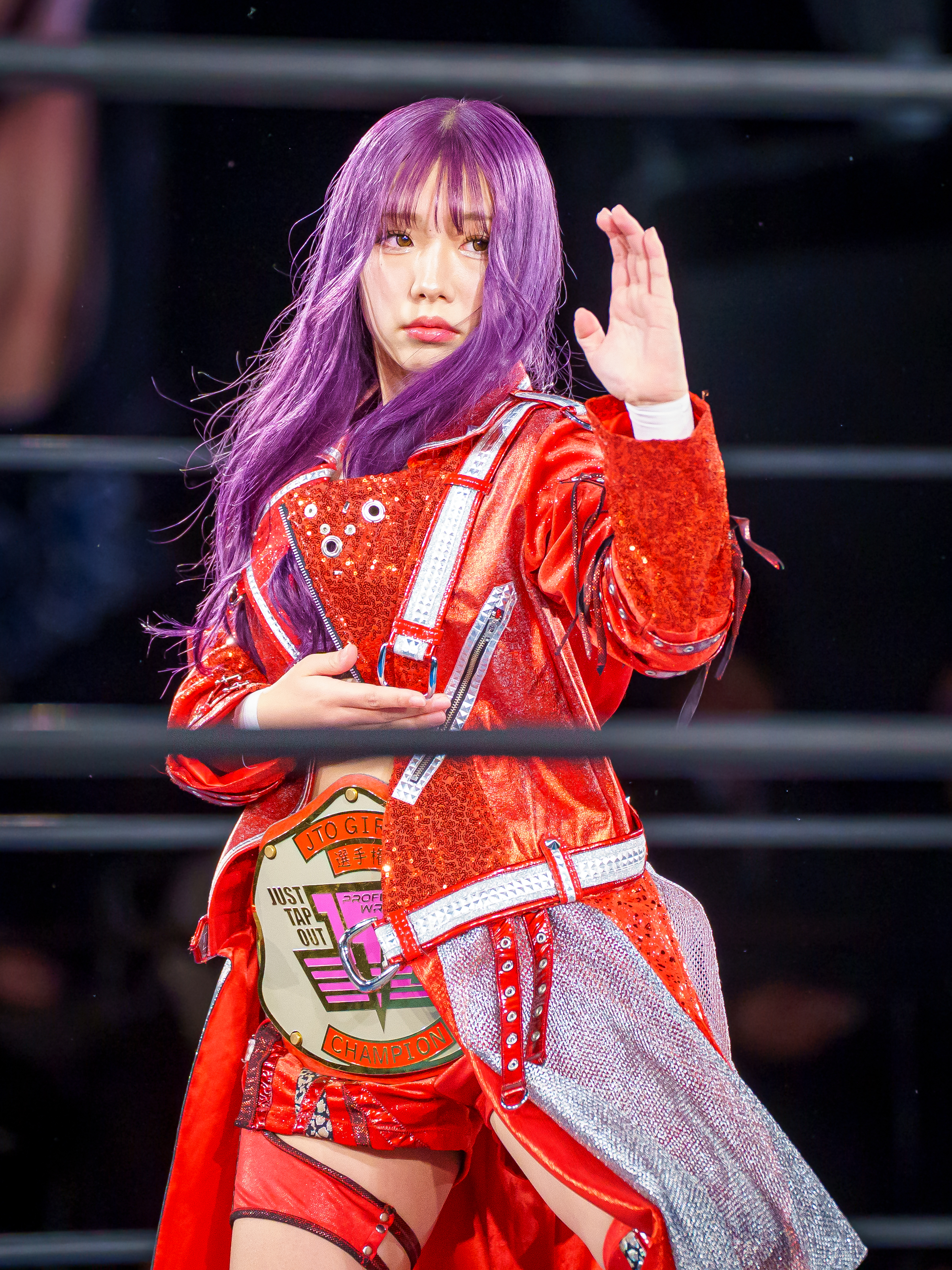
- Inaba as the JTO Girls Champion in January 2025

Personal information
- Born: 29 November 2007 (age 18) Toyokawa, Japan
- Family: Tomoka Inaba (sister)

Professional wrestling career
- Ring name: Azusa Inaba Delirious Dolly
- Billed height: 156 cm (5 ft 1 in)
- Billed weight: 50 kg (110 lb)
- Debut: 2023

Azusa Inaba (稲葉あずさ, Inaba Azusa) is a Japanese professional wrestler. She is signed to Professional Wrestling Just Tap Out (JTO), where she is the current JTO Girls Champion in her second reign. She also appears for JTO’s partners World Wonder Ring Stardom, where she is a member of H.A.T.E. and a former New Blood Tag Team Champion.

== Professional wrestling career ==
=== Professional Wrestling Just Tap Out (2023–present) ===
Azusa made her professional wrestling debut at JTO Tournament 2023 Finals on March 3, where she fell short to her sister Tomoka Inaba in singles competition.

During her time with the promotion, she chased for various championships promoted by JTO, and by other promotions from the Japanese independent scene. At JTO GIRLS House on September 26, 2023, she teamed up with Tomoka Inaba and unsuccessfully challenged Misa Kagura and Sumika Yanagawa for the International Ribbon Tag Team Championship. At the JTO 1 Day Mixed Tag Tournament from December 13, 2023, Azusa unsuccessfully challenged Kagura for the JTO Girls Championship. At a house show promoted JTO three days later on December 16, she unsuccessfully challenged Sumika Yanagawa for the Princess of Pro-Wrestling Championship.

=== World Wonder Ring Stardom (2023–present) ===
Azusa made her debut in World Wonder Ring Stardom in the New Blood series of events specially created for rookies and newer wrestlers. She made her first appearance at Stardom New Blood 8 on May 12, 2023, where she teamed up with Tomoka Inaba and wrestled Hanan and Hina into a time-limit draw. At the very next New Blood event from June 2, 2023, Azusa and Tomoka unsuccessfully challenged Bloody Fate (Karma and Starlight Kid) for the New Blood Tag Team Championship. A couple of months later at Stardom New Blood 11 on September 28, 2023, Azusa unsuccessfully challenged Rina for the Future of Stardom Championship.

Azusa made her first appearance in Stardom's main pay-per-views at Stardom Dream Queendom 2023 on December 29, where she teamed up with Miyu Amasaki and Yuzuki to defeat Hanako, Kurara Sayaka and Ranna Yagami in a Six-woman tag team match. At Stardom Flashing Champions 2024 on May 18, she teamed up with Oedo Tai (Rina and Fukigen Death) to defeat Empress Nexus Venus (Mina Shirakawa, Xena and Waka Tsukiyama) in the same type of bout. Azusa returned to the New Blood series of events at Stardom New Blood 13 on June 21, 2024, where she teamed up with Rina to defeat Queen's Quest (Miyu Amasaki and Hina).

==== H.A.T.E. (2024–present) ====
At Stardom Nighter in Korakuen II on July 23, 2024, Azusa teamed up with Rina and defeated wing★gori (Hanan and Saya Iida) to win the New Blood Tag Team Championship.

== Championships and accomplishments ==
- Pro Wrestling Illustrated
  - Ranked No. 130 of the top 250 female wrestlers in the PWI Women's 250 in 2025
- Professional Wrestling Just Tap Out
  - Queen of JTO Championship (1 time)
  - JTO Girls Championship (2 times, current)
  - JTO Girls Tag Team Championship (1 time) – with Aoi
  - The Second Triple Crown Champion
  - JTO Girls Tournament (2025)
- World Wonder Ring Stardom
  - New Blood Tag Team Championship (1 time) – with Rina
