= Rian (wrestler) =

Japanese professional wrestler

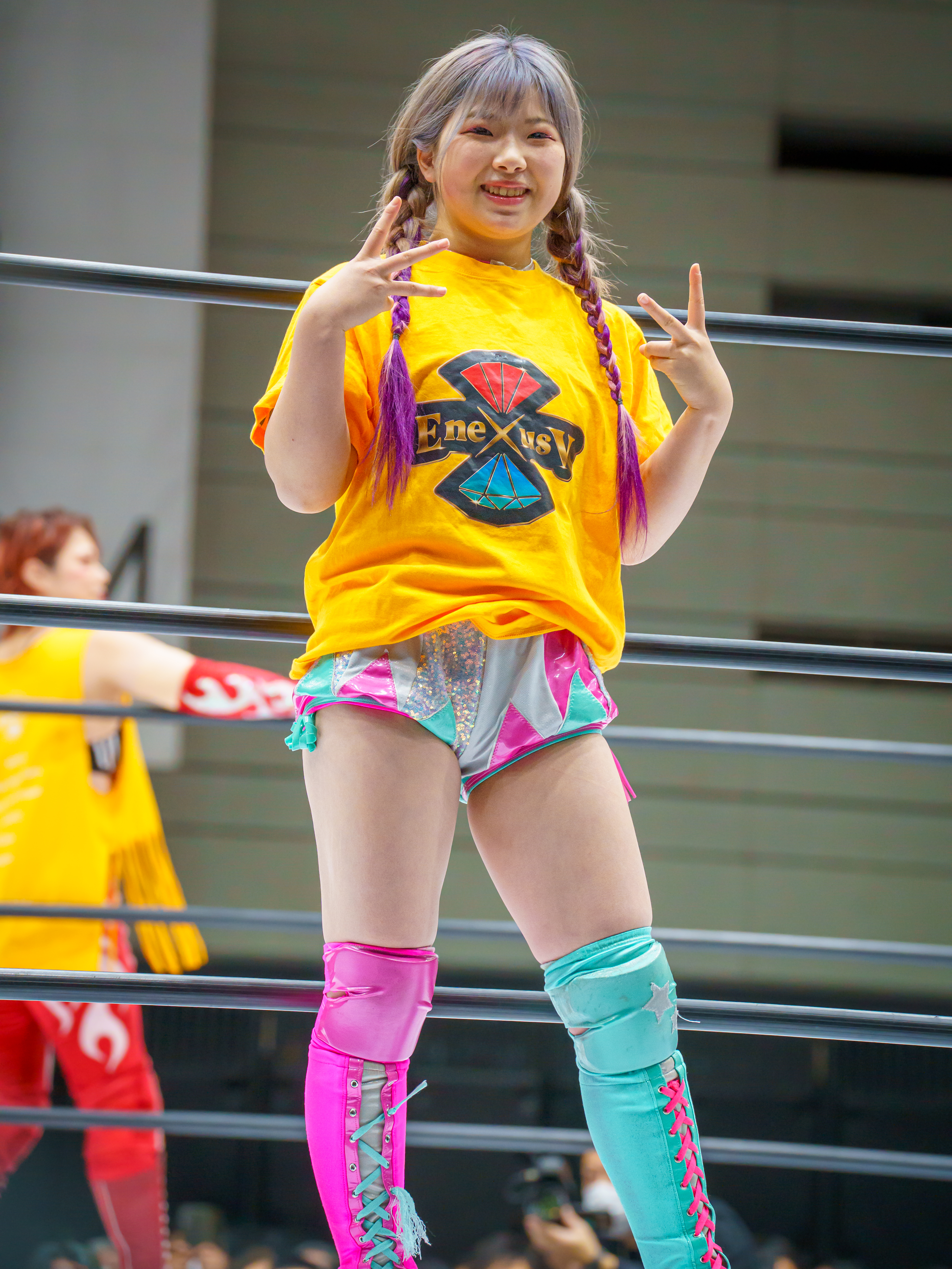
- Rian in January 2025

Personal information
- Born: Rian Kaneda (兼田 梨杏); February 3, 2005 (age 21) Hachinohe, Japan

Professional wrestling career
- Ring name: Rian
- Billed height: 1.50 m (4 ft 11 in)
- Billed weight: 49 kg (108 lb)
- Trained by: Maika; Maki Itoh
- Debut: March 30, 2024

Rian Kaneda (金田りあん, Kaneda Rian; born February 3, 2005) is a Japanese professional wrestler. She is signed to World Wonder Ring Stardom, where she performs under her real name (stylized mononymously as Rian (梨杏)) and is one-half of the current New Blood Tag Team Champions alongside Kikyo Furusawa in their first reign.

== Early life ==
Rian was born in Hachinohe, Japan, on February 3, 2005. She had watched professional wrestling since she was a child because of her father's love of wrestling.

Her childhood dream was to become a pastry chef, but in her second year of high school she decided to become a professional wrestler.

== Professional wrestling career ==
=== World Wonder Ring Stardom (2023-present) ===
Rian became a Stardom trainee in April 2023, and passed the pro-test in October 2023.

On March 30, 2024 at Stardom in Sendai 2024 at Sendai PIT, Rian made her professional wrestling debut in a losing effort against Starlight Kid.

On September 13, 2024 at New Blood 14, Rian achieved her first tag team victory, partnering with Maika to defeat Cosmic Angels (Tam Nakano and Sayaka Kurara).

On September 19, 2024 at Stardom Aomori 2 Days in Hachinohe, Rian joined Empress Nexus Venus.

Rian along with stablemate Waka Tsukiyama entered the 2024 Goddesses of Stardom Tag League as "Reckless Fantasy", finishing on 4 points with wins over God's Eye (Hina & Lady C) and Devil Princess (Rina & Azusa Inaba), but failed to qualify for the playoff rounds.

On June 8, 2025 at Korakuen Hall, Rian achieved her first singles match victory by defeating Akira Kurogane to determine the number one contender for the Future of Stardom Championship.

On June 21, 2025 at The Conversion, Rian unsuccessfully challenged Hina for the Future of Stardom Championship.

Rian entered the 2025 5 Star Grand Prix, finishing last in the Red Stars B block on 0 points.

On October 20, 2026 at Stardom Nighter in Korakuen, Meni☆Mani (Kikyo Furusawa and Rian) defeated Sakurara (Aya Sakura and Sayaka Kurara) to win the New Blood Tag Team Championship, marking Rian's first title in Stardom.

== Championships and accomplishments ==
- World Wonder Ring Stardom
  - New Blood Tag Team Championship (1 time, current) – with Kikyo Furusawa
