= Yuria Hime =

Japanese professional wrestler

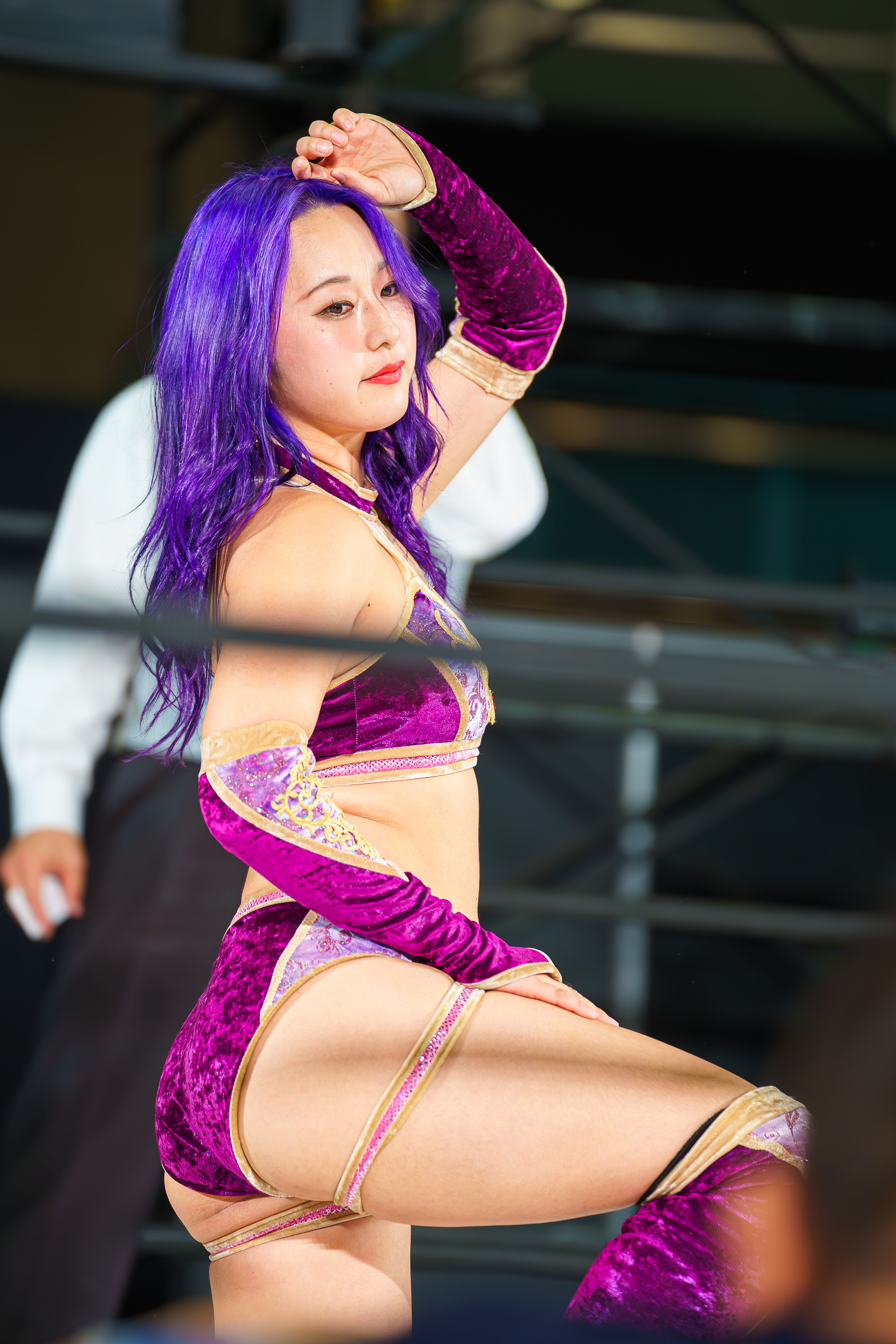
- Yuria in December 2025

Personal information
- Born: February 6, 1999 (age 27) Utsunomiya, Japan

Professional wrestling career
- Ring name: Yuria Hime
- Billed height: 162 cm (5 ft 4 in)
- Billed weight: 57 kg (126 lb)
- Trained by: Mina Shirakawa; Maika; Saya Iida
- Debut: 2025

Yuriko Yomota (蓬田结梨杏, Yomota Yuriko; born February 6, 1999), better known by her ring name Yuria Hime (姫 ゆりあ, Hime Yuria) and formerly known under the pseudonymous Yuria Yomogita (蓬田ゆりあ, Yomogita Yuria), is a Japanese professional wrestler and former gravure idol. She is signed to World Wonder Ring Stardom, where she is a member of Stars.

== Professional wrestling career ==
=== World Wonder Ring Stardom (2025–present) ===
In December 2023, Hime joined World Wonder Ring Stardom as a trainee.

Hime made her official in-ring debut at Stardom Award 2025 in Takadanobaba on January 26, 2025, where she unsuccessfully challenged Maika in singles competition.
