= Ranna Yagami =

Japanese professional wrestler

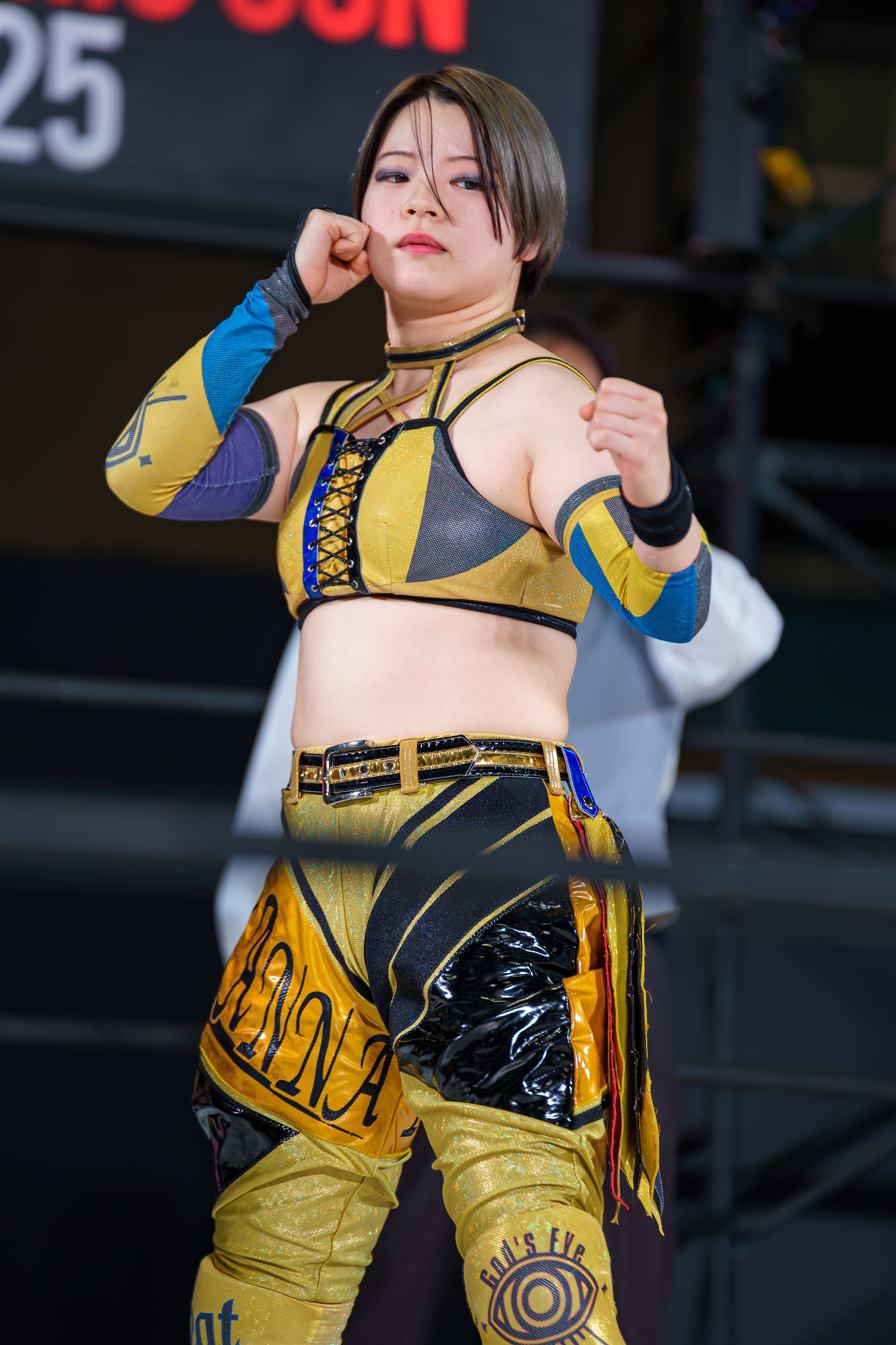
- Ranna Yagami in December 2025

Personal information
- Born: November 18 Toshima, Tokyo, Japan

Professional wrestling career
- Ring name: Ranna Yagami
- Billed height: 159 cm (5 ft 3 in)
- Billed weight: 57 kg (126 lb)
- Trained by: Syuri
- Debut: 2023

Ranna Yagami (八神 蘭奈, Yagami Ranna; born November 18) is a Japanese professional wrestler. She is signed to World Wonder Ring Stardom where she is a member of God's Eye. She is the current Future of Stardom Champion.

== Professional wrestling career ==
=== World Wonder Ring Stardom (2023–present) ===
On March 2023, Yagami joined World Wonder Ring Stardom as a trainee.

Yagami made her official in-ring debut at Stardom New Blood 12 on December 25, 2023, where she faced Syuri.

Yagami joined God's Eye on January 20, 2024.

Yagami defeated Hanako to win the Future of Stardom Championship at Stardom Cinderella Tournament: Night 5 on March 15, 2026.

== Kumas de Apuestas record ==
Winner (wager)	Loser (wager)	Location	Event	Date	Notes
Koguma (bear)	Ranna Yagami (bear)	Korakuen Hall, Tokyo	Stardom Supreme Fight	February 2, 2025	Ranna Yagami was forced to do the Kuma pose

== Championships and accomplishments ==
- World Wonder Ring Stardom
  - Future of Stardom Championship (1 time, current)
