= Mi Vida Loca (professional wrestling) =

Professional wrestling stable

- Official logo (2025–present)

Stable
- Leader: Suzu Suzuki
- Members: Rina Yamashita; Itsuki Aoki; Akira Kurogane; Bozilla
- Debut: April 24, 2025
- Years active: 2025–present

Mi Vida Loca (ミ・ヴィダ・ロカ, Mi Bida Roka) is a professional wrestling stable mainly performing in the Japanese professional wrestling promotion World Wonder Ring Stardom. Led by Suzu Suzuki, the stable also consists of Rina Yamashita, Itsuki Aoki, Akira Kurogane and Bozilla.

== History ==
=== Formation (April 2025–present) ===
On April 3, 2025, at Stardom Nighter in Korakuen, after weeks of sharing heat with former "Crazy Star" tag partner Mei Seira from her ex-unit of Neo Genesis, Suzu Suzuki turned on the latter as she hinted her parting ways with the stable. Moments after that, Natsuko Tora of H.A.T.E. offered Suzuki a spot in her unit but the latter refused, stating that she would rather continue as a lone wolf. On April 24, 2025, Suzuki was scheduled to face Kohaku and former stablemates Mei Seira and Miyu Amasaki in a six-woman tag team match with two mystery tag partners. They were later announced to be Itsuki Aoki and Rina Yamashita alongside whom she won the match. After the bout concluded, Akira Kurogane requested to side with the newly created stable of "Mi Vida Loca".

At Stardom All Star Grand Queendom 2025 on April 27, Suzu Suzuki defeated Mei Seira in singles competition, thus ending their feud generated by Suzuki's defecting from Neo Genesis. At Stardom New Blood 21 on May 9, 2025, Akira Kurogane defeated Yuria Hime in singles competition. At a house show from May 24, 2025, Suzuki, Aoki and Yamashita unsuccessfully challenged Starlight Kid, AZM and Miyu Amasaki for the Artist of Stardom Championship. At Stardom New Blood 22 on June 4, 2025, Kurogane fell short to Debbie Keitel. At The Conversion on June 21, 2025, Suzu Suzuki, Rina Yamashita, Itsuki Aoki and Akira Kurogane defeated Starlight Kid, AZM, Mei Seira and Miyu Amasaki in eight woman tag team competition. During the bout, Bozilla appeared and helped Mi Vida Loca members win the bout, as she was presented as the newest member after the match ended.

At the following year's edition of The Conversion on June 20, 2026 at, Suzuki defeated Sayaka Kurara to win the World of Stardom Championship, bringing the stable their first Stardom championship in the form of the company's top title.

=== Independent circuit (2025–present) ===
At the time of their formation, only Suzu Suzuki and Akira Kurogane were Stardom signees, however, they also did freelance work such as the rest of the members who contractually belonged to other promotions. Itsuki Aoki represented the stable in the 2025 edition of Pro Wrestling Wave's Catch the Wave tournament.

== Members ==
Mi Vida Loca
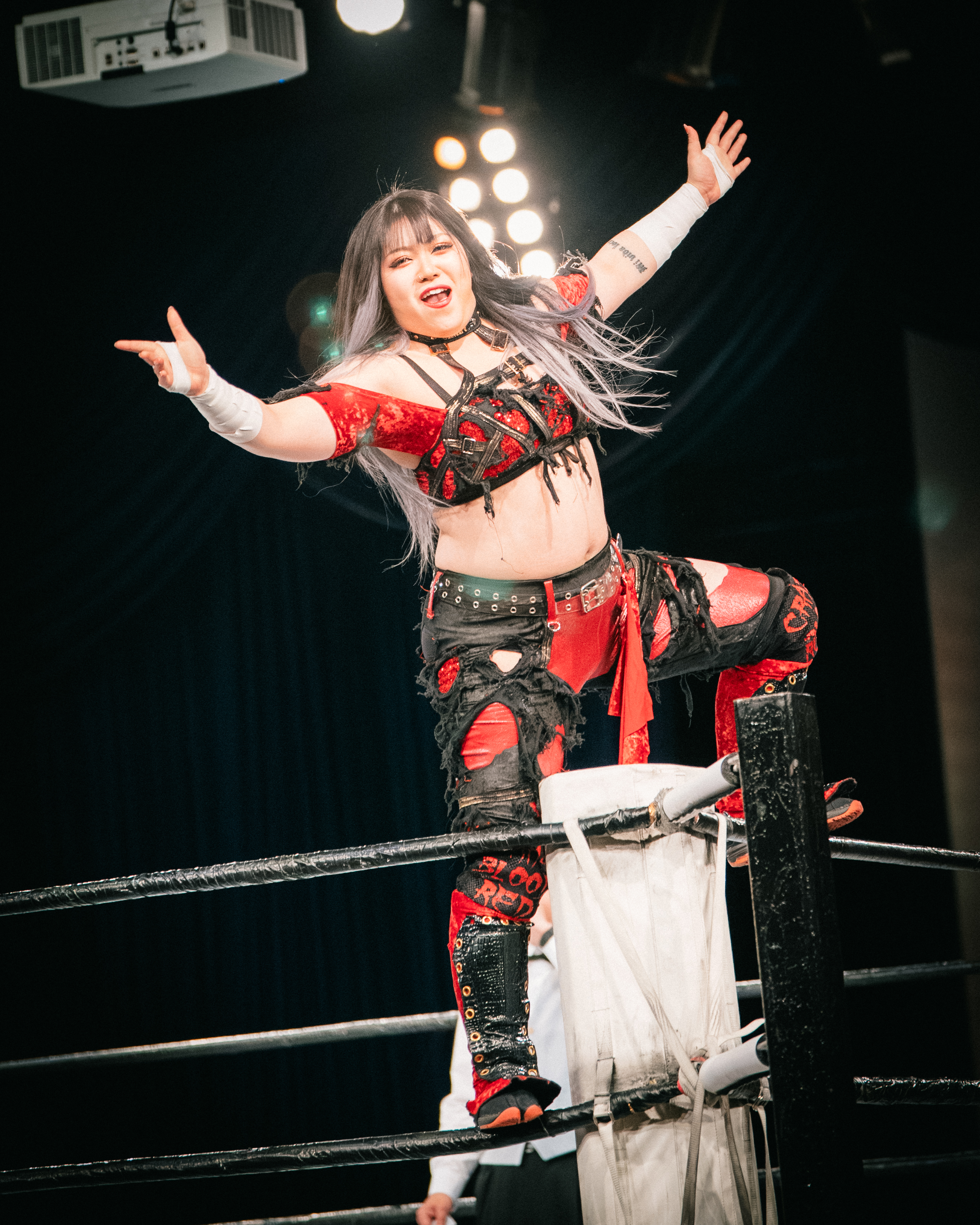
Suzu Suzuki (I)

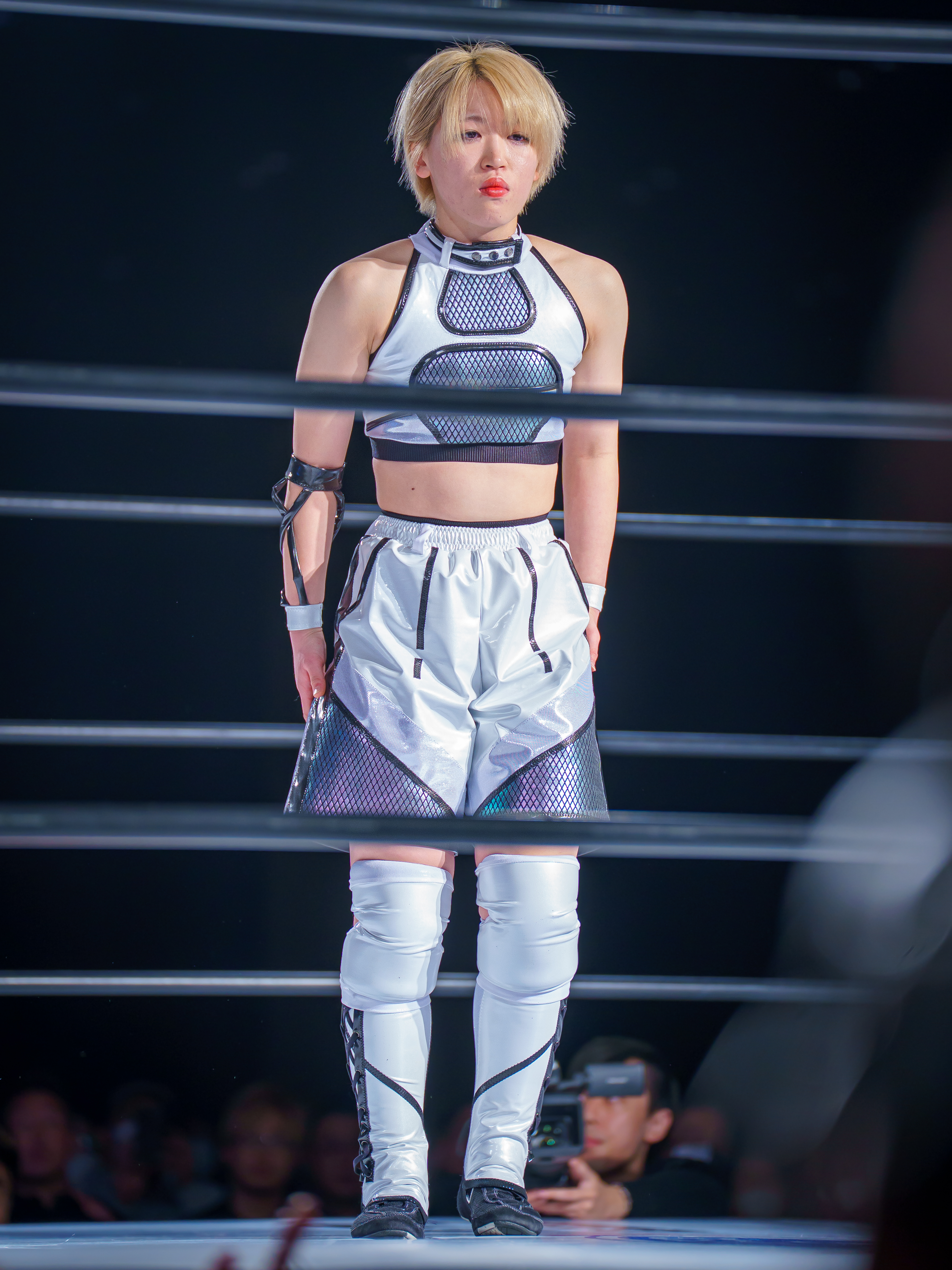
Akira Kurogane

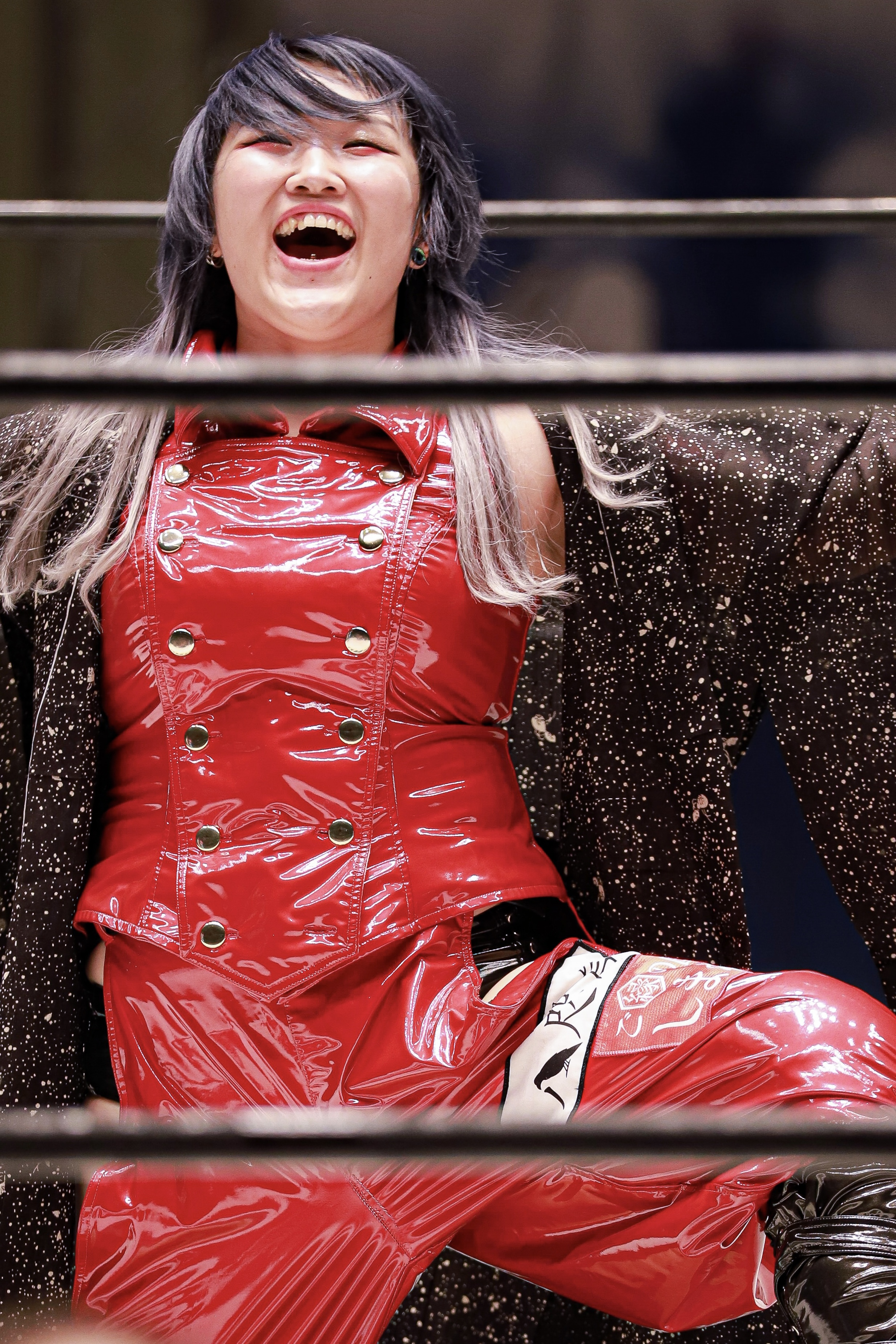
Itsuki Aoki

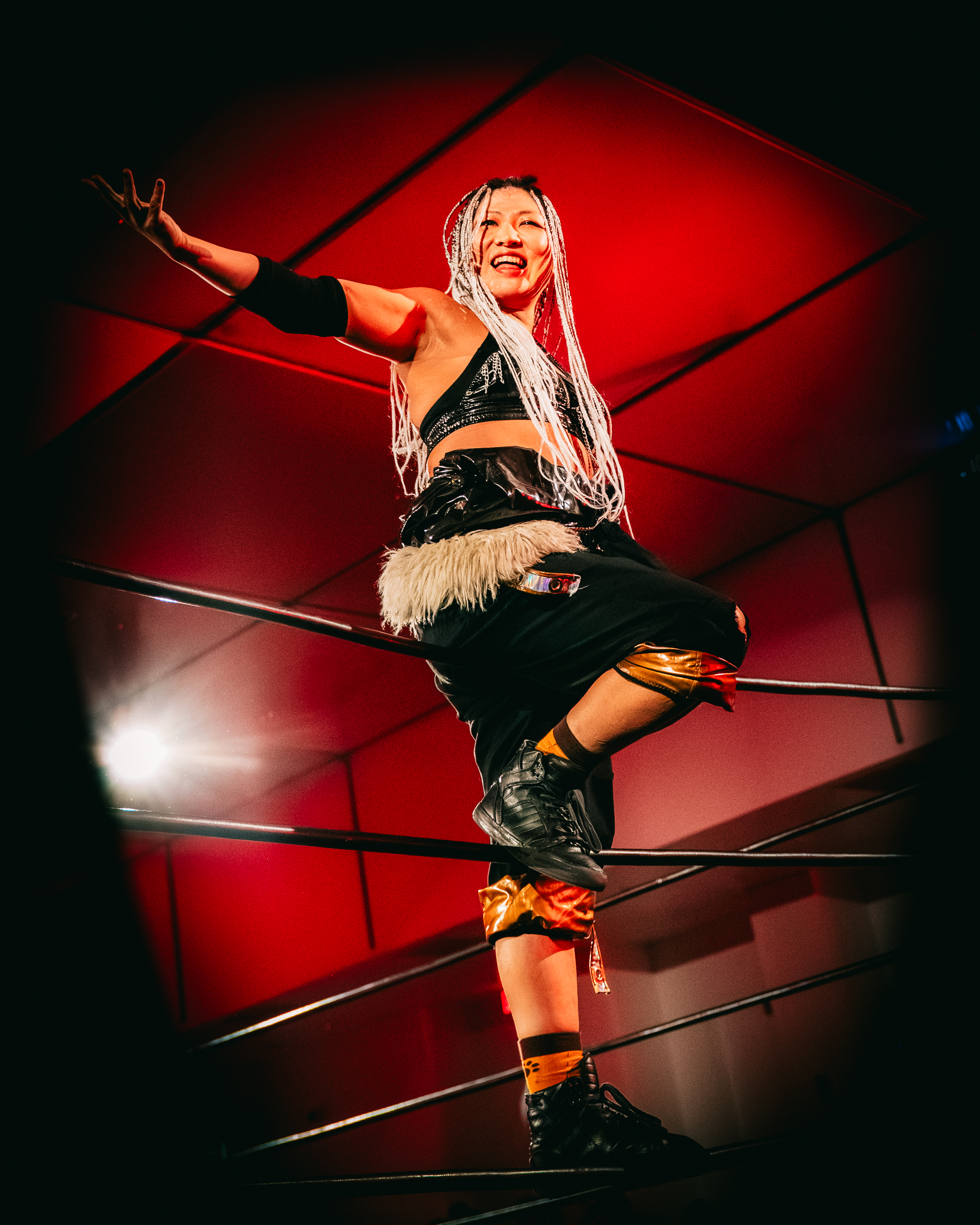
Rina Yamashita

*	Founding member
I	Leader

=== Current ===
Member		Joined
Suzu Suzuki	*I	April 24, 2025
Akira Kurogane	*	April 24, 2025
Itsuki Aoki	*	April 24, 2025
Rina Yamashita	*	April 24, 2025
Bozilla		June 21, 2025

== Sub-groups ==
=== Current ===
Affiliate	Members	Tenure	Type
Bloody Girls’ School	Suzu Suzuki; Rina Yamashita	2025–present	Tag Team

== Championships and accomplishments ==
- ChocoPro
  - Super Asia Championship (1 time) – Yamashita
- Pro Wrestling Illustrated
  - Ranked Suzuki No. 143 of the top 250 female singles wrestlers in the PWI Women's 250 in 2025
- Pro Wrestling Wave
  - Wave Single Championship (1 time) – Aoki
- Seadlinnng
  - Beyond the Sea Tag Team Championship (1 time) – Aoki with Ayame Sasamura (Note: Sasamura was not part of the stable while holding the titles with Aoki.)
- World Wonder Ring Stardom
  - World of Stardom Championship (1 time, current) – Suzuki
  - 5★Star GP Awards (2 times)
    - Outstanding Performance Award (2025) – Suzuki
    - Blue Stars Best Match Award (2025) vs. Saori Anou on August 6 in Blue Stars A – Bozilla
