= Saran (wrestler) =

Japanese wrestler (born 2009)

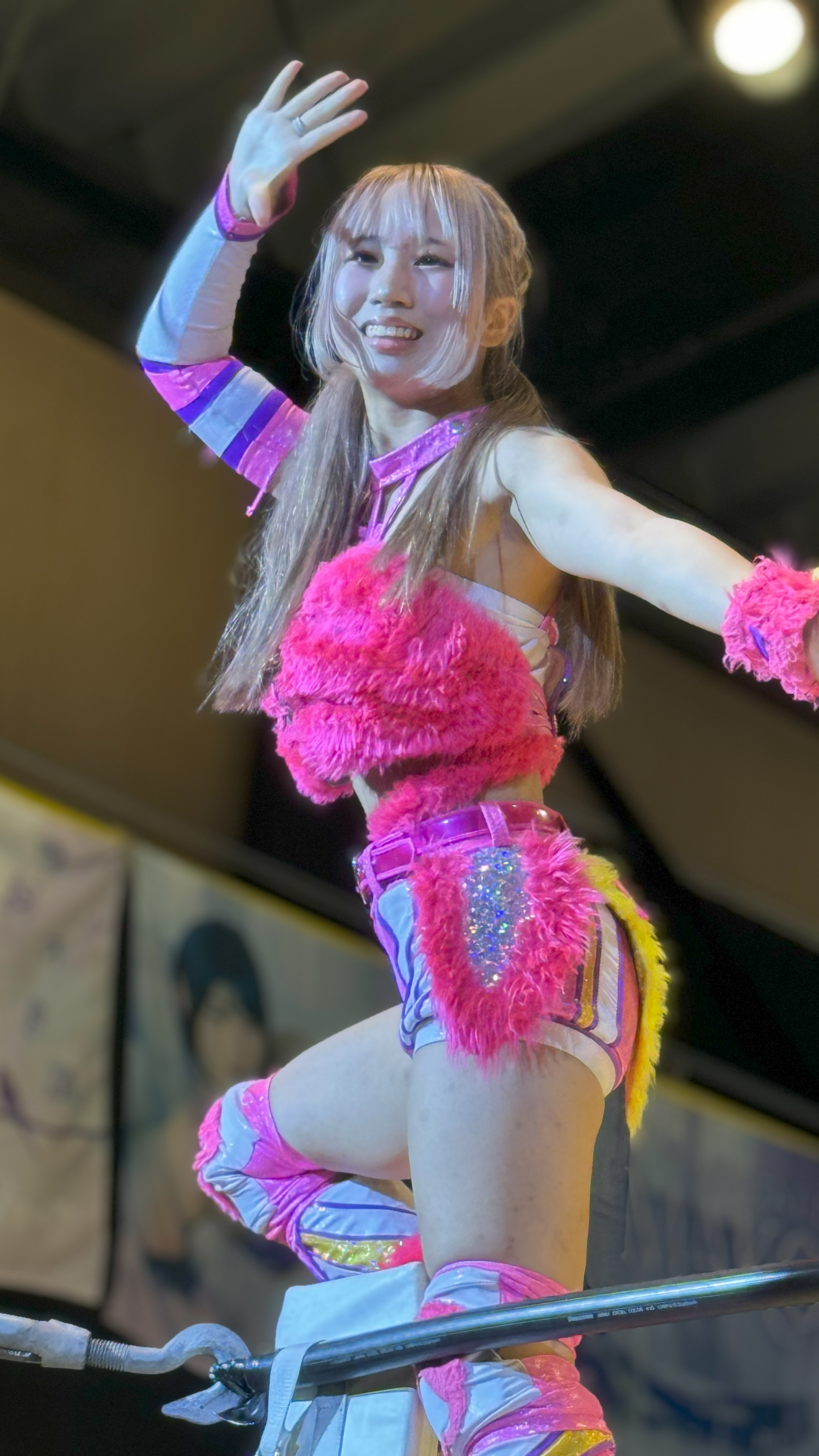
- Saran in September 2024

Personal information
- Born: 21 February 2009 (age 17) Saitama, Japan

Professional wrestling career
- Ring name: Budou Saran
- Billed height: 149 cm (4 ft 11 in)
- Billed weight: 40 kg (88 lb)
- Trained by: Ice Ribbon Dojo
- Debut: 2021

Saran (咲蘭, Saran) is a Japanese professional wrestler signed to Pro Wrestling Wave where she is a former Wave Tag Team Champion alongside Yumi Ohka. She is also known for her tenure with Ice Ribbon and for freelance work in various other promotions from the Japanese independent scene.

== Professional wrestling career ==
=== Ice Ribbon (2021–present) ===
Saran made her professional wrestling debut in Ice Ribbon at Ice Ribbon #1107 on April 3, 2021, under the ring name of "Budou" where she wrestled Suzu Suzuki into a time-limit draw. During her time with the promotion, she chased for various accomplishments. She competed in a tournament for the vacant ICE Cross Infinity Championship in early 2022 where she fell short to Maika Ozaki in the first rounds. At Ice Ribbon #1366 on August 24, 2024, she unsuccessfully challenge Nanami and Kyuri in a three-way match for the Triangle Ribbon Championship.

=== Pro Wrestling Wave (2024–present) ===
Saran won the first title of her career, the Wave Tag Team Championship by teaming up with "Life Thirty-One" tag team partner Yumi Ohka to defeat Azure Revolution (Maya Yukihi and Risa Sera) for the vacant titles at WAVE Prime Wave 2025 on November 2.

Saran competed in various of the promotion's signature events. In the Catch the Wave series, she made her first appearance at the 2025 edition in which she placed herself in the "Neptune" Block, scoring a total of five points after competing against Yuuri, Cherry and Yuko Sakurai.

In the Dual Shock Wave tournament, Saran made her first appearance ath the 2024 edition where she teamed up with Yumi Ohka and wrestled Aya Sakura and Sakura Hirota into a time-limit draw in the first rounds, then fell short to Kohaku and Tomoko Watanabe in the second. At the 2025 edition, she teamed up again with Ohka in a losing effort against Tropikawild (Saki and Yuna Mizumori) in the first rounds.

=== World Wonder Ring Stardom (2024–present) ===
Saran often competes in World Wonder Ring Stardom as a developmental talent, mainly in the New Blood series of events. She made her debut at Stardom New Blood 13 on June 21, 2024, where she wrestled Hanako into a time-limit draw. At Stardom New Blood 18 on February 5, 2025, she teamed up with Kohaku and Honoka in a losing effort against God's Eye (Tomoka Inaba, Hina and Kiyoka Kotatsu). At Stardom New Blood 20 on March 27, 2025, she teamed up with the two of them again, this time in a losing effort against H.A.T.E. (Saya Kamitani, Ruaka and Azusa Inaba). At Stardom New Blood 21 on May 9, 2025, she teamed up with Asuka Goda in a losing effort against Sakurara (Aya Sakura and Sayaka Kurara). At Stardom New Blood 22 on June 4, 2025, she teamed up with Honoka and unsuccessfully competed in a three-way tag team match won by God's Eye (Hina and Ranna Yagami) and also involving H.A.T.E. (Azusa Inaba and Fukigen Death). At Stardom New Blood 23 on July 4, 2025, she teamed up with Goda in a losing effort against Rian and Honoka.

== Championships and accomplishments ==
- Pro Wrestling Wave
  - Wave Tag Team Championship (1 time) – with Yumi Ohka
