= Stardom New Blood 22 =

2025 World Wonder Ring Stardom event

New Blood 22
- Promotional artwork of the event
- Promotion: World Wonder Ring Stardom
- Date: June 4, 2025
- City: Tokyo, Japan
- Venue: Tokyo Square
- Attendance: 153

Event chronology
← Previous; New Blood 21	Next → The Conversion

New Blood chronology
← Previous; New Blood 21	Next → New Blood 23

Stardom New Blood 22 (スターダム ニュー ブラッド 22, Sutādamu nyū Buraddo 22) was a professional wrestling event promoted by World Wonder Ring Stardom. The event took place on June 4, 2025, in Tokyo, Japan at the Tokyo Square.

== Production ==
=== Background ===
"New Blood" is a series of events that mainly focus on matches where rookie wrestlers, usually with three or fewer years of in-ring experience, evolve. Besides wrestlers from Stardom, various superstars from multiple promotions of the Japanese independent scene are invited to compete in bouts that are usually going under the stipulation of singles or tag team matches.

The show featured professional wrestling matches that result from scripted storylines, where wrestlers portray villains, heroes, or less distinguishable characters in the scripted events that build tension and culminate in a wrestling match or series of matches.

=== Event ===
The entire event was broadcast live on Stardom's YouTube channel. It started with the tag team confrontation between Ema Maishima and Kikyo Furusawa, and Aya Sakura and Sayaka Kurara, solded with the victory of the latters. Next up, Asuka Goda picked up a victory over Yuria Hime in singles competition. The third bout saw Debbie Keitel defeat Akira Kurogane in another singles confrontation. Next up, Hina and Ranna Yagami outmatched the teams of Honoka and Saran, and Azusa Inaba and Fukigen Death in three-way tag team competition. In the semi main event, Nanami Hatano defeated Rian in singles competition.

In the main event, Waka Tsukiyama and Hanako defeated Himiko and Yuma Makoto to secure the third consecutive defense of the New Blood Tag Team Championship in that respective reign.

== Results ==
No.	Results	Stipulations	Times
1	Sakurara (Aya Sakura and Sayaka Kurara) defeated Ema Maishima and Kikyo Furusawa by pinfall	Tag team match	9:11
2	Asuka Goda defeated Yuria Hime by pinfall	Singles match	8:18
3	Debbie Keitel defeated Akira Kurogane by pinfall	Singles match	10:15
4	God's Eye (Hina and Ranna Yagami) defeated Honoka and Saran, and H.A.T.E. (Azusa Inaba and Fukigen Death) by pinfall	Three-way tag team match	14:22
5	Nanami Hatano defeated Rian by pinfall	Singles match	11:39
6	Rice or Bread (Waka Tsukiyama and Hanako) (c) defeated Himiko and Yuma Makoto by pinfall	Tag team match for the New Blood Tag Team Championship	12:22
(c) / – the champion(s) heading into the match
