= Stardom New Blood 21 =

2025 World Wonder Ring Stardom event

New Blood 21
- Promotion: World Wonder Ring Stardom
- Date: May 9, 2025
- City: Tokyo, Japan
- Venue: Shin-Kiba 1st Ring
- Attendance: 268

Event chronology
← Previous; All Star Grand Queendom	Next → New Blood 22

New Blood chronology
← Previous; New Blood 20	Next → New Blood 22

Stardom New Blood 21 (スターダム ニュー ブラッド 21, Sutādamu nyū Buraddo 21) was a professional wrestling event promoted by World Wonder Ring Stardom. The event took place on May 9, 2025, in Tokyo, Japan at the Shin-Kiba 1st Ring.

== Production ==
=== Background ===
"New Blood" is a series of events that mainly focus on matches where rookie wrestlers, usually with three or fewer years of in-ring experience, evolve. Besides wrestlers from Stardom, various superstars from multiple promotions of the Japanese independent scene are invited to compete in bouts that are usually going under the stipulation of singles or tag team matches.

The show featured professional wrestling matches that result from scripted storylines, where wrestlers portray villains, heroes, or less distinguishable characters in the scripted events that build tension and culminate in a wrestling match or series of matches.

=== Event ===
The entire event was broadcast live on Stardom's YouTube channel. It started with the singles confrontation between Yuria Hime and Akira Kurogane, solded with the victory of the latter. Next up, Aya Sakura and Sayaka Kurara picked up a victory over Saran and Asuka Goda in tag team competition. In the third bout, Yuna Mizumori defeated Soy in singles competition. Next up, Himiko, Mizuki Katou and Yuma Makoto outmatched Empress Nexus Venus members Waka Tsukiyama, Hanako and Rian in six-woman tag team competition. The fifth bout saw Yuna Manase and Maika Ozaki defeat Lady C and Ranna Yagami in tag team competition.

In the main event, Hina, Tomoka Inaba and Nanami picked up a victory over Rina, Azusa Inaba and Fukigen Death in six-woman tag team competition.

== Results ==
No.	Results	Stipulations	Times
1	Akira Kurogane defeated Yuria Hime	Singles match	7:28
2	Sakurara (Aya Sakura and Sayaka Kurara) defeated Saran and Asuka Goda	Tag team match	10:55
3	Yuna Mizumori defeated Soy	Singles match	11:31
4	Himiko, Mizuki Kato and Yuma Makoto defeated Empress Nexus Venus (Waka Tsukiyama, Hanako and Rian)	Six-woman tag team match	12:08
5	Yuna Manase and Maika Ozaki defeated God's Eye (Lady C and Ranna Yagami)	Tag team match	12:42
6	God's Eye (Hina, Tomoka Inaba and Nanami) defeated H.A.T.E. (Rina, Azusa Inaba and Fukigen Death)	Six-woman tag team match	15:17
